= 1932 Speedway National League =

British speedway league season

- League: National League
- No. of competitors: 9
- Champions: Wembley Lions
- National Trophy: Wembley Lions
- NSA Trophy: Stamford Bridge Pensioners
- London Cup: Wembley Lions
- Highest average: Dicky Case

The National League was formed in 1932 combining teams from the Northern League and Southern League. It was the fourth season of speedway in the United Kingdom.

== Summary ==
From the teams that finished the 1931 Northern League, Leeds Lions and Preston closed down, leaving only Belle Vue Aces and Sheffield. From the 1931 Southern League, High Beech and Lea Bridge had closed Plymouth Tigers were new competitors.

In the first half of the season, the teams competed for the National Association (NSA) Trophy in a league format won by Stamford Bridge Pensioners. In May 1932, the Southampton Saints promotion left Banister Court Stadium to take over the licence at Lea Bridge Stadium, with the team becoming the Clapton Saints. At the end of the NSA Trophy phase Sheffield dropped out.

In the second half of the season Wembley Lions won the inaugural National League title. Dicky Case of the Wimbledon Dons finished with the highest average.

== League ==
=== Final table ===
Pos	Team	PL	W	D	L	Pts
1	Wembley Lions	16	13	0	3	26
2	Crystal Palace Glaziers	16	11	1	4	23
3	Belle Vue Aces	16	9	1	6	19
4	Stamford Bridge Pensioners	16	8	1	7	17
5	Wimbledon Dons	16	8	1	7	17
6	West Ham Hammers	16	7	0	9	14
7	Coventry	16	6	0	10	12
8	Clapton Saints	16	4	0	12	8
9	Plymouth Tigers	16	4	0	12	8

=== Fixtures & results ===
Home \ Away	BV	CLA	COV	CP	PLY	SB	WEM	WH	WIM
Belle Vue		38–16	38–15	32–22	35–15	31–23	29–25	35–18	26–26
Clapton	21–32		24–27	28–26	36–18	31–23	20–34	21–31	35–19
Coventry	32.5–21.5	28–25		22–31	34–18	29–25	22–29	30–24	24–29
Crystal Palace	30–24	35–19	31–22		31–20	27–27	30–24	25–27	34–20
Plymouth	23–25	33–20	31–22	19–35		30–22	16–35	32–18	22–29
Stamford Bridge	30–22	39–15	37–16	25–29	39–15		29–25	31–22	34–19
Wembley	41–13	33–20	30–24	29–25	27–24	30–24		33–20	29–25
West Ham	29–25	29–22	35–18	25–26	34–20	20–33	14–40		28–25
Wimbledon	27–26	35–17	35–19	23–31	33.5–20.5	28–26	23–31	31–23	

Legend: Blue = home team win; Yellow = draw; Red = away team win.

== Top Ten Riders ==
		Nat	Team	C.M.A.
1	Dicky Case	(Australia)	Wimbledon	10.42
2	Ginger Lees	(England)	Wembley	10.40
3	Wal Phillips	(England)	Stamford Bridge	10.33
4	Syd Jackson	(England)	Coventry	10.13
5	Ron Johnson	(Australia)	Crystal Palace	9.60
6	Vic Huxley	(Australia)	Wimbledon	9.50
7	Eric Langton	(England)	Belle Vue	9.33
8	Nobby Key	(England)	Crystal Palace	8.89
9	Jack Parker	(England)	Clapton	8.80
10	Frank Arthur	(Australia)	Stamford Bridge	8.64

== National Trophy ==
The 1932 National Trophy was the second edition of the Knockout Cup.

First round

Date	Team one	Score	Team two
06/07	Clapton	57-35	Plymouth
05/07	Plymouth	44-50	Clapton

Quarterfinals

Date	Team one	Score	Team two
27/07	Clapton	50-44	Coventry
28/07	Coventry	55-41	Clapton
30/07	Crystal Palace	51-43	Wimbledon
13/08	Stamford Bridge	46-45	Wembley
04/08	Wembley	54-42	Stamford Bridge
26/07	West Ham	51-42	Belle Vue
15/08	Wimbledon	54-42	Crystal Palace
23/07	Belle Vue	64-32	West Ham

Semifinals

Date	Team one	Score	Team two
10/09	Belle Vue	56-37	Wimbledon
03/09	Coventry	38-56	Wembley
08/09	Wembley	63-33	Coventry
19/09	Wimbledon	50-46	Belle Vue

=== Final ===
First leg

13 October 1932

Wembley Lions Ginger Lees 12 George Greenwood 12 Wally Kilmister 11 Jack Ormston 7 Norman Evans 7 Harry Whitfield 7 Lionel Van Praag 6 Gordon Byers 4	66 – 29	Belle Vue Aces Eric Gregory 7 Bob Harrison 6 Eric Langton 6 Frank Varey 3 Joe Abbott 3 Harold Hastings 2 Max Grosskreutz 1 Jack Dixon 1 Dusty Haigh 0 Larry Boulton 0

Empire Stadium

Second leg

15 October 1932

Belle Vue Aces Frank Varey 12 Eric Langton 12 Max Grosskreutz 9 Eric Gregory 7 Joe Abbott 6 Dusty Haigh 6 Bob Harrison 5 Harold Hastings 1	58 – 37	Wembley Lions Lionel Van Praag 7 Jack Ormston 6 Harry Whitfield 6 Ginger Lees 5 George Greenwood 5 Wally Kilmister 4 Norman Evans 1 Gordon Byers 1 Charlie Shelton 1 Colin Watson 1

Hyde Road

Wembley were declared National Trophy Champions, winning on aggregate 103-87.

== National Speedway Association Trophy ==
The National Association (NSA) Trophy was won by Stamford Bridge.

== Final table ==
Team	PL	W	D	L	Pts
Stamford Bridge Pensioners	18	16	0	2	32
Wembley Lions	18	14	0	4	28
Crystal Palace Glaziers	18	12	0	6	24
Belle Vue Aces	18	11	0	7	22
West Ham Hammers	18	11	0	7	22
Wimbledon Dons	18	11	0	7	22
Clapton Saints	18	5	0	13	10
Coventry	18	5	0	13	10
Sheffield	18	3	0	15	6
Plymouth Tigers	18	2	0	16	4

=== Fixtures & results ===
Home \ Away	BV	CLA	COV	CP	PLY	SHE	SB	WEM	WH	WIM
Belle Vue		42–12	43–10	24–29	36–18	32–22	24–28	29–25	39–15	35–18
Clapton/Southampton	20–33		25–29	22–32	37–16	29–22	22–31	24–29	27–26	23–28
Coventry	21–32	23–31		26–23	28–23	34–18	24–29	20–34	23–31	21–32
Crystal Palace	34–18	31–23	35–18		35–19	36–17	18–36	27–26	33–21	37–17
Plymouth	25–28	16–34	34–20	16–37		39–14	26–28	15–36	20–33	24–28
Sheffield	15–37	34–19	14–35	38–16	37–17		22–32	20–34	17–35	23–26
Stamford Bridge	29–25	37–17	36–18	30–24	39–12	43–11		37–17	37–17	41–12
Wembley	28–25	37–16	33–20	32–22	36–16	41–11	31–21		31–23	28–24
West Ham	34–20	34–17	35–18	28–24	34–15	30–2	30–24	25–29		27–25
Wimbledon	28–26	33–19	38–15	25–29	34–13	34–18	24–30	28–26	31–21	

Legend: Blue = home team win; Yellow = draw; Red = away team win.

== London Cup ==
First round

Team one	Score	Team two
Wimbledon	53–38 , 37–57	Stamford Bridge
Clapton	42–48, 42–54	Crystal Palace
West Ham bye
Wembley bye

Semi final round

Team one	Score	Team two
West Ham	47–49, 41.5–46.5	Stamford Bridge
Wembley	65–30, 37–56	Crystal Palace

=== Final ===
First leg

17 September 1932

Stamford Bridge Wal Phillips 12 Frank Arthur 11 Jack Chapman 7 Dick Smythe 6 Bill Stanley 5 Gus Kuhn 4 Jack Bishop 2 Charlie Blacklock 1 Frank Bond 0	48–47	Wembley Jack Ormston 8 Lionel Van Praag 8 Ginger Lees 8 Norman Evans 6 Gordon Byers 5 Wally Kilmister 5 Colin Watson 4 Charlie Shelton 3

Stamford Bridge

Second leg

29 September 1932

Wembley Ginger Lees 10 Harry Whitfield 9 Jack Ormston 7 Norman Evans 7 Gordon Byers 7 Colin Watson 6 Wally Kilmister 4 Charlie Shelton 1 Lionel Van Praag 1	52–44	Stamford Bridge Wal Phillips 12 rank Arthur 11 Dick Smythe 9 Jack Chapman 5 Gus Kuhn 3 Ted Bravery 3 Bill Stanley 1 Charlie Blacklock 0

Empire Stadium

Wembley won on aggregate 99–92

== Riders & final averages ==
Belle Vue

- (England) Eric Langton 9.33
- (Australia) Max Grosskreutz 8.15
- (England) Frank Varey 8.00
- (England) Eric Gregory 7.15
- (England) Joe Abbott 7.00
- (England) Bob Harrison 6.84
- (England) Frank Charles 6.67
- (England) Broncho Dixon 4.38
- (England) Dusty Haigh 4.35
- (Australia) Harold Hastings 3.33
- (England) Larry Boulton 2.67

Clapton

- (England) Jack Parker 8.80
- (England) Norman Parker 7.50
- (England) Ernie Rickman 7.38
- (England) Phil Bishop 6.97
- (England) Wally Lloyd 6.50
- (England) Alf Foulds 5.65
- (England) Vic Collins 5.44
- (Australia) Steve Langton 5.24
- (England) Billy Dallison 4.50
- (England) Chun Moore 4.44
- (England) Frank Goulden 4.00
- (England) Ben Living 3.69
- (England) Roy Barrowclough 3.50
- (England) Arthur Westwood 2.32
- (England) Henry Taft 2.00

Coventry

- (England) Syd Jackson 10.13
- (England) Roy Dook 6.18
- (England) Arthur Tims 5.94
- (England) Cyril Taft 5.26
- (England) Bill Pitcher 5.00
- (England) Stew Fairbairn 4.94
- (England) Reg Hutchins 4.18
- (England) John Deeley 3.84
- (England) Stan Greatrex 3.66
- (England) Stan Dell 3.11

Crystal Palace

- (England) Ron Johnson 9.67
- (England) Nobby Key 8.75
- (England) Tom Farndon 8.00
- (England) Joe Francis 7.33
- (England) Eric Blain 5.89
- (England) Triss Sharp 5.85
- (England) George Newton 5.50
- (England) Alf Sawford 4.86
- (England) Alex Peel 4.43
- (England) Harry Shepherd 3.50

Plymouth

- (Australia) Eric Collins 8.11
- (England) Bill Clibbett 7.38
- (Australia) Frank Pearce 6.37
- (Australia) Bert Spencer 5.96
- (Australia) Jack Jackson 4.60
- (England) Frank Goulden 4.53
- (Australia) Clem Mitchell 4.00
- (England) Jack Barber 3.56
- (Australia) Stan Lupton 3.14
- (Australia) Ray Taylor 2.67

Stamford Bridge

- (England) Wal Phillips 10.33
- (Australia) Frank Arthur 8.64
- (England) Arthur Warwick 7.72
- (Australia) Dick Smythe 7.65
- (England) Gus Kuhn 6.42
- (New Zealand) Charlie Blacklock 6.00
- (Australia) Jack Chapman 4.27
- (England) Bill Stanley 4.00
- (Australia) Jack Bishop 2.40
- (Australia) Dick Wise 0.57

Wembley

- (England) Ginger Lees 10.40
- (New Zealand) Wally Kilmister 8.17
- (England) Reg Bounds 7.68
- (England) Harry Whitfield 7.30
- (Australia) Lionel Van Praag 6.95
- (England) Gordon Byers 6.92
- (England) George Greenwood 6.90
- (England) Colin Watson 6.67
- (England) Jack Ormston 6.29
- (England) Norman Evans 6.12

West Ham

- (England) Tiger Stevenson 8.00
- (Australia) Bluey Wilkinson 7.67
- (England) Tommy Croombs 7.20
- (England) Arthur Jervis 5.80
- (England) Les Wotton 5.11
- (Australia) Charlie Spinks 4.94
- (England) Tiger Hart 4.00
- (England) Arthur Atkinson 3.81
- (England) Rol Stobbart 2.86

Wimbledon

- (Australia) Dicky Case 10.42
- (Australia) Vic Huxley 9.50
- (United States) Ray Tauser 6.62
- (England) Wally Hull 5.76
- (Australia) Billy Lamont 5.22
- (England) Claude Rye 5.02
- (Wales) Ivor Hill 2.74
- (England) Len Parker 2.70
- (Australia) Con Cantwell 1.71

== See also ==
- List of United Kingdom Speedway League Champions
- Knockout Cup (speedway)
