= 1931 Speedway Southern League =

British speedway league season

- League: Southern League
- No. of competitors: 11
- Champions: Wembley Lions
- National Trophy: Wembley Lions
- London Cup: Crystal Palace Glaziers
- Highest average: Tommy Croombs
- Division/s other: 1931 Northern League

The 1931 Southern League was the third season of motorcycle speedway in the United Kingdom for Southern British teams, and its final season before amalgamation of the Southern and Northern Leagues. The Northern teams also had their third season known as the 1931 Speedway Northern League.

== Summary ==
Both Birmingham teams based at Perry Barr and Hall Green had left the league but the latter did ride in the National Trophy.

Coventry returned mid-season to replace Leicester Stadium who were liquidated in late May.

Harringay Canaries resigned in June to be replaced by a Belle Vue team, who then rode both in the Northern and Southern Leagues, the latter as Manchester. Nottingham closed in July but they were not replaced and their results stood. The league season was the longest in the short history of the competition as teams met each other four times instead of twice.

The Wembley Lions won their second consecutive title finishing three points clear of 1929 champions Stamford Bridge. The league suffered a fatality during the match between Belle Vue and Wembley at Hyde Road. James Allen (known as Indian Allen) was thrown from his bike and hit his head on a fence, trying to avoid a rider who had fallen in front of him. He died three days later in hospital on 12 September 1931. Another rider Noel Johnson of Plymouth had been killed in a challenge match against Coventry reserves on 25 August.

== Final table ==
Pos	Team	PL	W	D	L	Pts
1	Wembley Lions	37	28	1	8	57
2	Stamford Bridge Pensioners	38	27	0	11	54
3	West Ham Hammers	38	23	0	15	46
4	Crystal Palace Glaziers	38	22	0	16	44
5	Wimbledon Dons	38	19	1	18	39
6	High Beech	38	19	1	18	39
7	Southampton Saints	38	18	0	20	36
8	Harringay Canaries + Manchester (Belle Vue)	38	14	0	24	28*
9	Lea Bridge	38	11	0	27	22
10	Leicester Stadium + Coventry	37	8	1	28	17**
11	Nottingham	20	8	0	12	16

* Harringay scored 12 points from 14 matches, Belle Vue scored 16 from 24
** Leicester scored 1 point from 8 matches, Coventry scored 16 from 30

== Fixtures & results ==
=== A fixtures ===
Home \ Away	COV	CP	HAR	HB	LB	NOT	SOT	SB	WEM	WH	WIM
Coventry/Leicester		29–25	18–36	24–24	24–30	+	24–30	26–27	22–31	23–28	30–24
Crystal Palace	32–20		27–26	33–20	31–21	29–24	30–245	26–24	16–36	25–27	32–22
Harringay/Belle Vue	26–25	30–21		29–25	32–22	32–22	29–24	24–29	28–26	24–30	25–27
High Beech	35–18	27–23	29–24		32–20	29–21	29–23	27–26	30–24	27–26	41–12
Lea Bridge	33–21	23–25	25–28	22–31		37–16	32–22	22–31	18–36	18–32	20–34
Nottingham	30–23	29–25	28–25	32–22	33–21		29–25	26–23	26–28	24.5–29.5	34–17
Southampton	36–18	36–18	36–17	29–24	26–27	38–15		26–28	31–23	23–31	31.5–21.5
Stamford Bridge	33–20	32–21	35–19	32–20	37–16	33–20	38–13		23–30	35–15	31–22
Wembley	37–17	42–12	37–16	43–11	34–20	37–16	31–23	31–22		32–22	31–22
West Ham	34–19	33–19	28–25	31–23	35–17	28–23	33.5–20.5	23–30	24–29		25–28
Wimbledon	33–20	40–13	28–24	36–17	22–31	35–19	26–24	26–27	22–30	21–32	

Legend: Blue = home team win; Yellow = draw; Red = away team win.

+ Awarded to Coventry

=== B fixtures ===
Home \ Away	COV	CP	HAR	HB	LB	SOT	SB	WEM	WH	WIM
Coventry/Leicester		19–35	28–24	26–27	25–29	32–22	24–28	29–25	29–25	28–26
Crystal Palace	36–18		45–9	39–15	38–15	38–15	31–23	30–23	32–22	30–22
Harringay/Belle Vue	31–22	28–26		28–22	28–26	29–24	23–31	16–36	24–28	20–34
High Beech	31–22	32–20	38–16		34–20	19–31	30–23	20–33	21–33	28–23
Lea Bridge	35–19	22–32	32–20	8–15		24–30	23–31	22–32	21–33	28–26
Southampton	32–22	21–31	34–19	37–14	32–21		33–20	30–24	22–31	35–16
Stamford Bridge	39–15	28–25	41–11	23–29	34–20	31–22		32–21	29–24	32–22
Wembley	n/a	34–19	30–22	31–23	34–18	32–22	34–19		29.5–24.5	27–27
West Ham	33–21	23–28	30–24	30–21	34–19	26–27	21.5–32.5	20–32		235–17
Wimbledon	29–25	31–22	29–25	35–15	36–18	37–17	29–23	28–25	29–25	

Legend: Blue = home team win; Yellow = draw; Red = away team win.

== Top Five Riders ==
		Team	C.M.A.
1	Tommy Croombs	West Ham	10.41
2	Dicky Case	Wimbledon	10.14
3	Jack Parker	Southampton	10.02
4	Frank Arthur	Stamford Bridge	9.97
5	Vic Huxley	Harringay/Wimbledon	9.87

== National Trophy ==
The 1931 National Trophy was the first edition of the Knockout Cup. It was contested between teams from the Southern and Northern Leagues.

First round

Date	Team one	Score	Team two
11/05	Wimbledon	67-26	Birmingham Hall Green
12/05	West Ham	51-45	Southampton
13/05	Lea Bridge	59-33	Nottingham
14/05	Exeter	34-59	High Beech
14/05	Leicester Stadium	39.5-54.5	Stamford Bridge
15/05	Hall Green	42.5-49.5	Wimbledon
16/05	High Beech	61-33	Exeter
16/05	Southampton	42-49	West Ham
16/05	Stamford Bridge	59-35	Leicester Stadium
21/05	Nottingham	46-47	Lea Bridge

Second round

Date	Team one	Score	Team two
25/05	Belle Vue	73-22	Wombwell
25/05	York	42-53	Leicester Super
26/05	Glasgow White City	43-52	Preston
28/05	Sheffield	54-40	Leeds
30/05	Leeds	39-52	Sheffield
30/05	Leicester Super	69-26	York
30/05	Wombwell	27-64	Belle Vue
04/06	Preston	70-26	Glasgow White City
08/06	Wimbledon	60-36	Crystal Palace
09/06	Harringay	?	Stamford Bridge
09/06	West Ham	44-52	Wembley
10/06	Lea Bridge	52-38	High Beech
11/06	Wembley	56-37	West Ham
13/06	Crystal Palace	48-48	Wimbledon
13/06	High Beech	55-39	Lea Bridge

Quarterfinals

Date	Team one	Score	Team two
02/07	Preston	65-31	High Beech
11/07	Belle Vue	50-46	Wimbledon
11/07	Sheffield	41-55	Wembley
16/07	Leicester Super	44-50	Stamford Bridge
18/07	High Beech	48-42	Preston
23/07	Wembley	70-25	Sheffield
27/07	Wimbledon	55-41	Belle Vue
19/08	Stamford Bridge	61-31	Leicester Super

Semifinals

Date	Team one	Score	Team two
10/09	Preston	43-51	Stamford Bridge
17/09	Wembley	48-47	Wimbledon
21/09	Wimbledon	46-49	Wembley
26/09	Stamford Bridge	66-30	Preston

=== Final ===
First leg

8 October 1931

Wembley Lionel Van Praag 12 George Greenwood 11 Colin Watson 9 Wally Kilmister 9 Harry Whitfield 9 Jack Ormston 8 Norman Evans 7 Jack Jackson 6	71 – 24	Stamford Bridge Frank Arthur 10 Dick Smythe 5 Percy Dunn 3 Mick Murphy 3 Bill Stanley 2 Cliff Watson 1 Dick Wise 0 Frank Duckett 0 Hal Herbert 0

Empire Stadium

Second leg

10 October 1931

Stamford Bridge Frank Arthur 12 Arthur Warwick 11 Bill Stanley 8 Cliff Watson 3 Dick Smythe 2 Percy Dunn 2 Hal Herbert 2 Gus Kuhn 1 Mick Murphy 1	45 – 49	Wembley Wally Kilmister 9 Lionel Van Praag 8 Colin Watson 8 Jack Ormston 6 George Greenwood 5 Harry Whitfield 5 Norman Evans 4 Charlie Shelton 3 Jack Jackson 1 Col Stewart 0

Stamford Bridge

Wembley were declared National Trophy Champions, winning on aggregate 120-69.

== London Cup ==
First round

Team one	Score	Team two
Wimbledon	46–50, 45–49	Wembley
West Ham	41.5–53.5, 36–58	Stamford Bridge
Lea Bridge	60–35, 48–46	High Beech
Crystal Palace bye

Semi final round

Team one	Score	Team two
Lea Bridge	41–55, 27–69	Crystal Palace
Stamford Bridge	50–46, 41.5–35.5	Wembley

=== Final ===
First leg

19 September 1931

Crystal Palace Ron Johnson 12 Tom Farndon 9 Joe Francis 9 Nobby Key 7 Roger Frogley 6 Triss Sharp 6 Harry Shepherd 5 Alf Sawford 5	59–36	Wembley Colin Watson 7 Jack Ormston 7 Norman Evans 7 Lionel Van Praag 5 Wally Kilmister 4 Jack Jackson 3 Charlie Shelton 2 Col Stewart 1 Cliff Parkinson 0

Exhibition Grounds

Second leg

24 September 1931

Wembley Norman Evans 8 Colin Watson 7 Jack Ormston 6 Jack Jackson 5 George Greenwood 5 Wally Kilmister 3 Lionel Van Praag 2 Buster Frogley 2 Charlie Shelton 2	40–55	Crystal Palace Tom Farndon 12 Ron Johnson 12 Joe Francis 11 Nobby Key 9 Roger Frogley 6 Triss Sharp 3 Alf Sawford 2 Harry Shepherd 0

Empire Stadium

Crystal Palace won on aggregate 114–76

== Riders & final averages ==
Crystal Palace

- (England) Nobby Key 8.32
- (England) Ron Johnson 7.75
- (England) Joe Francis 7.51
- (England) Harry Shepherd 6.79
- (England) Tom Farndon 6.61
- (England) Alf Sawford 6.55
- (England) Roger Frogley 6.30
- (England) Triss Sharp 4.20
- (England) George Lovick 2.67

Harringay (withdrew)

- (Australia) Vic Huxley 10.56
- (England) Don Durant 6.95
- (England) Alf Sawford 5.94
- (England) Bill Clibbett 5.65
- (England) Clem Cort 5.41
- (England) Eric Spencer 5.33
- (Wales) Ivor Hill 5.33

High Beech

- (England) Phil Bishop 7.26
- (England) Billy Dallison 6.76
- (England) Syd Edmonds 6.69
- (England) Jack Barnett 6.43
- (England) George Bishop 6.37
- (England) Reg Hutchins 6.09
- (Australia) Bobby Blake 5.56
- (England) Stan Baines 4.80
- (England) Tiger Hart 4.79
- (Australia) Art Fenn 4.57
- (England) Tommy McDonald 4.23
- (England) Henry Taft 4.00
- (Australia) Frank Pearce 3.83

Lea Bridge

- (England) Squib Burton 10.22
- (Australia) Charlie Spinks 7.91
- (England) Stew Fairbairn 6.97
- (England) Don Durant 6.95
- (Australia) Harold Hastings 6.80
- (England) Roy Dook 6.39
- (England) Alf Foulds 6.00
- (New Zealand) Alf Mattson 4.79
- (Australia) Eric Collins 4.44
- (England) Reg Stanley 4.32
- (England) Jimmy Stevens 3.71

Leicester/Coventry

- (England) Syd Jackson 6.86/9.22
- (England) Squib Burton 8.20/x
- (England) Arthur Tims 6.27/7.10
- (England) Bunny Wilcox x/6.50
- (Australia) Alby Taylor 5.36/6.67
- (England) Stan Greatrex 2.40/5.16
- (England) John Deeley 5.00/4.27
- (England) Henry Taft x/4.98
- (England) Lew Lancaster x/4.89
- (England) Bill Pitcher 4.55/x
- (England) Albert Wilkinson x/4.55
- (Guernsey) Stan Mauger x/4.31
- (England) Cyril Taft x/4.00
- (England) Les Patrick 3.14/3.47

Manchester (Belle Vue)

- (Australia) Max Grosskreutz 8.14
- (England) Arthur Franklyn 6.39
- (England) Frank Charles 6.20
- (England) Clem Cort 6.06
- (Australia) Reg West 6.00
- (England) Bob Harrison 5.33
- (England) Chun Moore 5.33
- (England) Andy Nicholl 3.64
- (England) James Indian Allen 3.56
- (England) Eric Gregory 3.28
- (England) Frank Burgess 3.20
- (England) Len Blunt 3.20
- (England) Charlie Hornby 2.57

Nottingham

- (England) George Wigfield 8.93
- (England) Fred Strecker 8.26
- (England) Billy Ellmore 7.58
- (England) Nobby Key 7.29
- (England) Buster Brown 5.07
- (England) George Dykes 5.03
- (England) Nobby Kendrick 4.57
- (England) Bert Fairweather 4.00
- (England) Wally Humphry 4.00
- (England) Joe Gooding 3.72

Southampton

- (England) Jack Parker 9.87
- (England) Ernie Rickman 7.42
- (England) Vic Collins 6.98
- (England) Norman Parker 6.44
- (England) Frank Goulden 5.83
- (England) Frank Bond 5.35
- (Australia) Arnie Hansen 4.88
- (Australia) Steve Langton 4.67
- (England) Eric Lister 4.00
- (England) Jimmy Hayes 3.14

Stamford Bridge

- (Australia) Frank Arthur 10.09
- (England) Wal Phillips 10.06
- (England) Arthur Warwick 8.65
- (England) Gus Kuhn 8.31
- (Australia) Dick Smythe 6.85
- (England) Hal Herbert 6.40
- (Australia) Dick Wise 5.60
- (Australia) Mick Murphy (John Glass) 5.33
- (England) Bill Stanley 5.20
- (England) Don Boswell 4.32
- (England) Les Blakebrough 4.43
- (South Africa) Keith Harvey 4.29
- (New Zealand) Charlie Blacklock 4.25
- (Australia) Frank Duckett 3.60

Wembley

- (England) Colin Watson 9.56
- (England) Jack Ormston 9.09
- (England) George Greenwood 8.75
- (England) Harry Whitfield 7.96
- (England) Norman Evans 7.50
- (Australia) Lionel Van Praag 7.33
- (England) Buster Frogley 7.09
- (New Zealand) Wally Kilmister 6.59
- (Australia) Jack Jackson 5.30
- (Australia) Col Stewart 4.76
- (England) Cliff Parkinson 4.00
- (England) Charlie Shelton 2.09

West Ham

- (England) Tommy Croombs 10.55
- (England) Reg Bounds 9.32
- (Denmark) Morian Hansen 9.00
- (Australia) Bluey Wilkinson 8.79
- (England) Tiger Stevenson 6.90
- (Australia) Bloss Bromfield 4.13
- (England) Allen Kilfoyle 4.10
- (England) Arthur Atkinson 4.36
- (Australia) Frank Randall 3.79
- (Australia) Con Cantwell 3.25
- (England) Cecil Bounds 3.09
- (Wales) Tom Lougher 1.71

Wimbledon

- (Australia) Dicky Case 10.19
- (Australia) Vic Huxley 9.43
- (United States) Ray Tauser 8.48
- (England) Jim Kempster 6.90
- (England) Len Parker 6.17
- (England) Claude Rye 6.06
- (Australia) Billy Lamont 5.91
- (Australia) Ernie Evans 5.72
- (Australia) Len Stewart 5.41
- (England) Arthur Westwood 5.19
- (Wales) Ivor Hill 3.24

== See also ==
- List of United Kingdom Speedway League Champions
- Knockout Cup (speedway)
