= 1935 Speedway National League =

British speedway league season

- League: National League Division One
- No. of competitors: 7
- Champions: Belle Vue Aces
- National Trophy: Belle Vue Aces
- A.C.U Cup: Belle Vue Aces
- London Cup: Harringay Tigers
- Highest average: Bluey Wilkinson

The 1935 National League Division One was the seventh season of motorcycle speedway in Great Britain.

== Summary ==
Walthamstow Wolves relocated to Hackney Wick Stadium at the end of the 1934 season and started 1935 as the Hackney Wick Wolves. Walthamstow had been subject to resident complaints.

Plymouth Tigers and Birmingham dropped out so there were only 7 teams, 6 of which were located in London. Bluey Wilkinson of West Ham Hammers topped the rider averages.

The only non-London club, Belle Vue Aces, won their third consecutive national title and Knockout Cup and second treble after winning the A.C.U Cup.

British champion Tom Farndon of the New Cross Lambs was fatally injured in a scratch race at New Cross Stadium, on 28 August. He was involved in a crash with Ron Johnson, who clipped the safety fence and fell causing Farndon to crash into Johnson's bike. Farndon suffered a fractured skull and spine injury and was unconscious when he was transferred to the Miller General Hospital in Greenwich. He died two days later on 30 August.

== Final table ==
Pos	Team	PL	W	D	L	Pts
1	Belle Vue Aces	24	17	2	5	36
2	Harringay Tigers	24	13	0	11	26
3	West Ham Hammers	24	12	1	11	25
4	Wembley Lions	24	11	0	13	22
5	Hackney Wick Wolves	24	10	1	13	21
6	New Cross Lambs	24	10	0	14	20
7	Wimbledon Dons	24	8	0	16	16

== Fixtures & results ==
=== A fixtures ===
Home \ Away	BV	HAC	HAR	NC	WEM	WH	WIM
Belle Vue		45–27	45–26	41–30	46–25	35–35	41–31
Hackney	35–37		40–30	29–43	43–28	38–33	29–43
Harringay	31–41	43–29		44–27	41–30	40–31	30–39
New Cross	31–40	43–24	38–33		34–38	43–29	38–33
Wembley	37–34	42–28	41–31	38–34		28–42	35–36
West Ham	34–38	38–34	37–35	35–36	40–31		45–26
Wimbledon	34–37	43–29	38–30	29–42	29–41	37–34	

Legend: Blue = home team win; Yellow = draw; Red = away team win.

=== B fixtures ===
Home \ Away	BV	HAC	HAR	NC	WEM	WH	WIM
Belle Vue		30–41	44–25	47–25	49–23	46–26	43–26
Hackney	35–35		34.5–37.5	31–41	40–32	39–31	47–25
Harringay	46–25	32–35		42–29	43–28	43–27	43–29
New Cross	25–47	35–37	30–41		40–31	35–37	43–28
Wembley	30–42	45–26	32–39	50–22		45–25	48–22
West Ham	39–33	42–28	39–33	44–28	41–31		45–27
Wimbledon	35–36	26–46	35–36	41–30	25–46	43–27	

Legend: Blue = home team win; Yellow = draw; Red = away team win.

== Top Ten Riders ==
	Rider	Nat	Team	C.M.A.
1	Bluey Wilkinson	(Australia)	West Ham	10.57
2	Dicky Case	(Australia)	Hackney	10.12
3	Tom Farndon	(England)	New Cross	9.74
4	Max Grosskreutz	(Australia)	Belle Vue	9.57
5	Bill Kitchen	(England)	Belle Vue	9.18
6	Jack Parker	(England)	Harringay	9.13
7	Eric Langton	(England)	Belle Vue	9.10
8	Ron Johnson	(Australia)	New Cross	8.78
9	Jack Ormston	(England)	Harringay	8.75
10	Tommy Croombs	(England)	West Ham	8.74

== National Trophy ==
The 1935 National Trophy was the fifth edition of the Knockout Cup.

First round

Date	Team one	Score	Team two
13/07	Belle Vue	55-52	New Cross
13/07	Harringay	70-35	Hackney Wick
11/07	Wembley	55-52	West Ham
10/07	New Cross	54-54	Belle Vue
09/07	West Ham	67-41	Wembley
08/07	Hackney Wick	47-61	Harringay
	Wimbledon	Bye	

Semifinals

Date	Team one	Score	Team two
10/08	Belle Vue	64-34	West Ham
06/08	West Ham	54-53	Belle Vue
05/08	Wimbledon	41-64	Harringay
03/08	Harringay	69-39	Wimbledon

=== Final ===
First leg

7 September 1935

Harringay Tigers Jack Ormston 11 Norman Parker 11 Jack Parker 9 Phil Bishop 5 Bill Pitcher 5 Les Wotton 4	45 – 63	Belle Vue Aces Eric Langton 17 Bill Kitchen 17 Max Grosskreutz 15 Joe Abbott 10 Frank Varey 3 Bob Harrison 1 Wally Hull 0

Harringay Stadium

Second leg

14 September 1935

Belle Vue Aces Max Grosskreutz 18 Eric Langton 13 Bob Harrison 12 Joe Abbott 9 Bill Kitchen 6 Frank Varey 5	63 – 43	Harringay Tigers Norman Parker 12 Jack Parker 12 Bill Pitcher 5 Jack Ormston 4 Billy Dallison 3 Les Wotton 3 Phil Bishop 2 Fred Strecker 2

Hyde Road

Belle Vue were National Trophy Champions, winning on aggregate 126-88.

== A.C.U Cup ==
The 1935 Auto-Cycle Union Cup was the second edition of the Cup and was won by Belle Vue for the second time.

First round

Group 1

Team	PL	W	D	L	Pts
Belle Vue Aces	4	3	0	1	6
Wembley Lions	4	2	0	2	4
Wimbledon Dons	4	1	0	3	2

Group 2

Team	PL	W	D	L	Pts
Harringay Tigers	6	5	0	1	10
West Ham Hammers	6	3	0	3	6
New Cross Lambs	6	3	0	3	6
Hackney Wick Wolves	6	1	0	5	2

Group 1

Home \ Away	BV	WEM	WIM
Belle Vue		74–34	67–40
Wembley	43–64		72–35
Wimbledon	57–50	43–62	

Legend: Blue = home team win; Yellow = draw; Red = away team win.

Group 2

Home \ Away	HAC	HAR	NC	WH
Hackney		46–61	42–62	54–53
Harringay	46–61		62–45	64–43
New Cross	63–44	41–67		66–42
West Ham	65–43	60–48	53–52	

Legend: Blue = home team win; Yellow = draw; Red = away team win.

Final

Date	Team one	Team two	Score
31/08	Belle Vue	Harringay	73–34
31/08	Harringay	Belle Vue	54-54

== London Cup ==
First round

Team one	Score	Team two
Hackney Wick	48–57, 39–69	West Ham
Wimbledon	39–64, 32–75	Harringay

Semi final round

Team one	Score	Team two
Wembley	50–55, 41–66	Harringay
West Ham	63.5–41.5, 47–58	New Cross

=== Final ===
First leg

28 September 1935

Harringay Norman Parker 16 Jack Parker 16 Jack Ormston 16 Bill Pitcher 9 Phil Bishop 8 Les Wotton 3	68–37	West Ham Bluey Wilkinson 12 Arthur Atkinson 8 Tommy Croombs 6 Tiger Stevenson 4 Rol Stobart 4 Ken Brett 2 Stan Dell 1 George Saunders 0

Harringay Stadium

Second leg

1 October 1935

West Ham Bluey Wilkinson 15 Tommy Croombs 15 Tiger Stevenson 8 Arthur Atkinson 8 Rol Stobart 3 Stan Dell 3 George Saunders 2 Ken Brett 1	55–52	Harringay Jack Ormston 15 Norman Parker 12 Jack Parker 9 Phil Bishop 8 Bill Pitcher 4 Billy Dallison 3 Fred Strecker 1 Les Wotton 0

West Ham Stadium

Harringay won on aggregate 120–97

== Riders & final averages ==
Belle Vue

- (Australia) Max Grosskreutz 9.57
- (England) Bill Kitchen 9.18
- (England) Eric Langton 9.10
- (England) Joe Abbott 8.34
- (England) Bob Harrison 7.19
- (England) Wally Hull 5.41
- (England) Frank Varey 4.95
- (England) Eric Blain 3.23
- (England) Tommy Allott 2.29
- (England) Oliver Langton 2.18
- (England) Acorn Dobson 1.89

Hackney

- (Australia) Dicky Case 10.12
- (England) Dusty Haigh 7.89
- (Denmark) Morian Hansen 6.23
- (England) Wally Lloyd 6.16
- (England) Bill Clibbett 5.62
- (Australia) Clem Thomas 4.89
- (England) Squib Burton 4.78
- (Australia) Mick Murphy (John Glass) 4.62
- (Australia) Fred Tate 4.44
- (England) George Wilks 3.50
- (England) Cliff Parkinson 3.00

Harringay

- (England) Jack Parker 9.13
- (England) Jack Ormston 8.75
- (England) Norman Parker 6.86
- (England) Les Wotton 6.21
- (England) Bill Pitcher 5.97
- (England) Norman Evans 5.00
- (England) Fred Strecker 5.33
- (England) Phil Bishop 4.78
- (England) Billy Dallison 3.16

New Cross

- (England) Tom Farndon 9.74
- (England) Ron Johnson 8.78
- (England) Joe Francis 7.17
- (England) Norman Evans 6.80
- (England) Stan Greatrex 6.02
- (England) Nobby Key 4.86
- (England) George Newton 4.53
- (England) Harry Shepherd 4.00
- (England) Roger Frogley 4.00
- (England) Mike Erskine 3.86
- (England) Roy Dook 3.37
- (England) Fred Leavis 1.23

Wembley

- (England) Frank Charles 8.60
- (New Zealand) Wally Kilmister 8.33
- (Australia) Lionel Van Praag 7.79
- (England) Ginger Lees 6.35
- (England) Gordon Byers 6.11
- (England) Norman Evans 6.11
- (England) Broncho Dixon 5.74
- (England) Eric Gregory 5.04
- (Australia) Dick Smythe 4.73

West Ham

- (Australia) Bluey Wilkinson 10.57
- (England) Tommy Croombs 8.74
- (England) Arthur Atkinson 6.67
- (Australia) Mick Murphy (John Glass) 6.50
- (England) Tiger Stevenson 6.44
- (England) George Saunders 4.76
- (England) Arthur Warwick 4.27
- (England) Rol Stobbart 4.22
- (England) Stan Dell 3.70
- (England) Ken Brett 3.13

Wimbledon

- (Australia) Vic Huxley 8.71
- (England) Syd Jackson 6.37
- (England) Gus Kuhn 5.91
- (England) Wal Phillips 5.66
- (Australia) Jack Sharp 5.52
- (England) Geoff Pymar 5.46
- (England) Wal Morton 5.07
- (England) Claude Rye 4.74
- (Australia) Eric Collins 3.83

== See also ==
- List of United Kingdom Speedway League Champions
- Knockout Cup (speedway)
