= 1930 Speedway Southern League =

British speedway league season

- League: Southern League
- No. of competitors: 13
- Champions: Wembley Lions
- London Cup: Wembley Lions
- Highest average: Vic Huxley
- Division/s other: 1930 Northern League

The 1930 Southern League was the second season of speedway in the United Kingdom for Southern British teams. The Northern teams also had their second season known as the 1930 Speedway Northern League.

== Summary ==
White City had left the league but three new teams - High Beech, Leicester Stadium and Nottingham all joined and Birmingham Bulldogs returned as Hall Green Bulldogs. The Wembley Lions won their first title. Birmingham Brummies (Perry Barr) withdrew after 4 meetings and their record was expunged

== Final table ==
Pos	Team	PL	W	D	L	Pts
1	Wembley Lions	24	20	1	3	41
2	Southampton Saints	24	17	1	6	35
3	Stamford Bridge Pensioners	24	16	1	7	33
4	Wimbledon Dons	24	16	1	7	33
5	Hall Green Bulldogs	24	13	1	10	27
6	Coventry	24	13	1	10	27
7	Crystal Palace Glaziers	24	11	1	12	23
8	Lea Bridge	24	10	1	13	21
9	West Ham Hammers	24	10	0	14	20
10	Leicester Stadium	24	8	1	15	17
11	High Beech	24	8	0	16	16
12	Harringay Canaries	24	7	0	17	14
13	Nottingham	24	2	1	21	5

Withdrawal (Record expunged) : Birmingham (Perry Barr)

== Fixtures & results ==
Home \ Away	COV	CP	HG	HAR	HB	LB	LEI	NOT	SOT	SB	WEM	WH	WIM
Coventry		34–20	30–23	35–19	43–11	36–18	34–19	30–22	30–22	27–26	0–36	29–25	32–22
Crystal Palace	38–15		34–19	33–18	29–24	27–26	34–20	41–12	24–30	34–19	30–23	22–32	25–29
Hall Green	34–19	28–26		29–24	37–17	33–21	31–23	37–16	26–27	31–23	19–35	27–26	27–27
Harringay	18–35	31–22	22–32		30–24	32.5–20.5	29–24	38–16	28–25	24–29	23–31	25–28	17–37
High Beech	30–24	29–22	23–29	30–23		32–18	33–21	29–24	27–25	16–37	21–32	30–23	25–29
Lea Bridge	31–22	30–23	27–26	27–25	35–18		31–22	32–22	24–30	27–27	23–31	29–22	31–22
Leicester	29–24	27–27	23.5–30.5	26–27	30–23	29–25		31–23	23–27	33–20	25–29	29–22	30–20
Nottingham	27–27	16–37	26–28	27–26	32–22	26–27	22–32		26–28	21–31	22–31	24–30	21–33
Southampton	40–12	25–29	36–17	37–17	35–18	29–24	34–20	39–15		28.5–25.5	26.5–26.5	35–18	31–22
Stamford Bridge	34–20	35–19	34–19	36–18	42–12	34–19	36–17	38–14	26–28		29–24	37–16	28–26
Wembley	39–14	31–22	28.5–24.5	33–20	37–16	40–14	34–20	37–17	35–19	24–29		36–18	30–22
West Ham	20–33	31–23	28–24	41–13	35–19	33–21	33–20	39–11	18–36	24–29	21–33		25–29
Wimbledon	30–24	28–26	34–19	30–24	29–25	33–21	41–12	39–7	30–23	30–24	21–32	32–19	

Legend: Blue = home team win; Yellow = draw; Red = away team win.

== Top Five Riders ==
		Team	C.M.A.
1	Vic Huxley	Harringay	10.55
2	Jack Parker	Coventry	10.34
3	Jack Ormston	Wembley	10.29
4	Colin Watson	Harringay/Wembley	10.15
5	Billy Dallison	Hall Green	10.07

== London Cup ==
The 1930 London Cup was the inaugural competition for teams from the London area. Wembley were the winners.

First round

Team one	Score	Team two
Crystal Palace	52–43, 33–62	Wimbledon
Wembley	71–25, 44–52	High Beech
Stamford Bridge	60–35, 53–40	West Ham
Harringay	52–44, 47–47	Lea Bridge

Semi final round

Team one	Score	Team two
Harringay	50–46, 38–58	Stamford Bridge
Wimbledon	39–56, 44–52	Wembley

=== Final ===
First leg

9 October 1930

Wembley Colin Watson 10 Harry Whitfield 10 Jack Ormston 9 George Greenwood 8 Norman Evans 6 Buster Frogley 6 Wally Kilmister 5 Tiger Sanderson 5	59–37	Stamford Bridge Gus Kuhn 12 Arthur Warwick 12 Wal Phillips 5 Les Blakebrough 4 Ernie Mayne 2 Don Boswell 1 Fred Ralph 1 Nick Nicol 0 Colin Ford 0

Empire Stadium

Second leg

11 October 1930

Stamford Bridge Wal Phillips 11 Arthur Warwick 11 Gus Kuhn 8 Fred Ralph 6 Don Boswell 5 Nick Nicol 3 Les Blakebrough 3 Colin Ford 2 Ernie Mayne 0	49–46	Wembley Jack Ormston 11 Colin Watson 8 George Greenwood 8 Norman Evans 5 Harry Whitfield 5 Charlie Shelton 4 Wally Kilmister 3 Tiger Sanderson 2 Jack Jackson 0

Stamford Bridge
Attendance: 47,000

Wembley won on aggregate 105–83

== Riders & final averages ==
Birmingham

- Wally Lloyd 6.67
- Clem Mitchell 6.67
- Tim Reid 4.00
- Arthur Johnson 2.00
- Geoff Siddaway 2.00
- Joe Hassall 2.00

Coventry

- Jack Parker 10.34
- Tom Farndon 8.30
- Norman Parker 7.25
- Arthur Tims 6.56
- Wilmot Evans 5.78
- John Deeley 5.71
- Bill Stanley 5.68
- Lew Lancaster 4.63
- Cecil Walker 4.57
- George Allbrook 2.91

Crystal Palace

- Roger Frogley 9.39
- Triss Sharp 8.63
- Ron Johnson 8.52
- Joe Francis 6.52
- Wally Lloyd 6.32
- Clem Mitchell 5.93
- Jack Barrett 5.13
- Harry Shepherd 4.20

Hall Green

- Billy Dallison 10.07
- Harry Taft 7.84
- Bunny Wilcox 7.17
- Reg Hutchins 6.93
- Cyril Taft 5.46
- Jimmy Gent 5.00
- Les Patrick 4.24

Harringay

- Vic Huxley 10.55
- Alf Sawford 5.61
- Howard Traynor 5.67
- Bill Clibbett 5.13
- Jack Kidwell 4.95
- Stan Spencer 4.48
- Wally Hicklin 4.17
- Ron Thompson 3.10
- Ivor Hill 2.61
- Percy Bryant 2.00

High Beech

- Phil Bishop 7.82
- Stan Baines 7.71
- Syd Edmonds 6.37
- Jack Barnett 6.13
- Stan Taylor 5.00
- George Bishop 4.52
- Jack Sharp 4.00
- Charlie Upham 2.86
- Charlie King 1.81

Lea Bridge

- Charlie Spinks 7.88
- Reg Stanley 7.47
- Jimmy Stevens 7.45
- Alf Foulds 7.30
- Harold Hastings 6.34
- Stew Fairbairn 6.22
- Harold Osment 5.46
- Ned Kelly 5.11
- Alex Peel 2.00

Leicester

- Cyril "Squib" Burton 9.67
- Syd Jackson 8.76
- Nobby Kendrick 5.59
- Jack Rowley 5.44
- Bill Crouch 4.98
- Bill Pitcher 4.52
- Arthur Johnson 3.00
- Cylone Smith 2.15
- Tom Taylor 1.54

Nottingham

- George Wigfield 8.22
- Nobby Key 6.84
- Billy Ellmore 5.86
- Joe Gooding 5.60
- Buster Brown 4.81
- Wally Humphrry 4.48
- Spencer Stratton 4.22
- Reg Lucas 3.26

Southampton

- Vic Collins 9.26
- Sprouts Elder 9.25
- Arnie Hansen 8.81
- Frank Goulden 7.73
- Geoff Taylor 7.68
- Jimmy Hayes 6.71
- Dick Sulway 5.93
- Clarrie Eldridge 5.74
- Eric Lister 5.71
- Ken Purser 5.25

Stamford Bridge

- Frank Arthur 9.84
- Gus Kuhn 9.35
- Arthur Warwick 8.70
- Wal Phillips 8.33
- Don Boswell 6.22
- Les Blakebrough 5.51
- Colin Ford 5.40
- Nick Nicol 4.41
- Fred Ralph 4.00
- Bill White 1.50

Wembley

- Jack Ormston 10.29
- Colin Watson 10.04
- Stan Catlett 8.59
- Harry Whitfield 7.73
- Arthur Atkinson 7.65
- Norman Evans 6.89
- Buster Frogley 6.34
- George Greenwood 6.26
- Wally Kilmister 2.67

West Ham

- Tommy Croombs 9.10
- Tiger Stevenson 8.64
- Reg Bounds 8.33
- Bluey Wilkinson 8.24
- Don Durant 6.46
- Roy Dook 6.29
- Arthur Westwood 5.70
- Den Taylor 4.73
- Les Maguire 3.91
- Bert Jones 3.37
- Allen Kilfoyle 2.75

Wimbledon

- Jim Kempster 9.21
- Dicky Case 8.48
- Billy Lamont 7.59
- Ray Tauser 7.40
- Len Parker 7.17
- Mart Sieffert 5.03
- Les Dearth 4.80
- Del Forster 4.22
- Harold Crook 3.27

== See also ==
- List of United Kingdom Speedway League Champions
