= 1931 Star Riders' Championship =

Motorcycle speedway competition in 1931

Seasons
- ← 1930 1932 →

The 1931 Star Riders' Championship was the third edition of the speedway Star Riders' Championship. The competition was decided on a knockout basis over nine heats.

== Final ==
- 18 September 1931
- Wembley, England

Pos.	Rider	Total
1	(United States) Ray Tauser	8
2	(Australia) Vic Huxley	7
3	(England) Tommy Croombs	6
4	(England) Jack Parker	6
5	(Australia) Frank Arthur	5
6	(England) Ernie Rickman	4
7	(England) Colin Watson	4
8	(England) Arthur Warwick	3
9	(Australia) Charlie Spinks	2
10	(England) Harry Shepherd	1
10	(England) Syd Jackson	1
10	(England) Norman Kendrick	1
10	(England) Les Patrick	1
14	(England) Phil Bishop	0
14	(Australia) Ron Johnson	0
14	(England) Fred Strecker	0
14	(Australia) Colin Stewart	0
14	(England) Sid Edmonds	0
14	(Australia) Harold Hastings	0
14	(Australia) Bluey Wilkinson	0

=== Heat details ===
Heat 1 : Watson, Tauser, Shepherd, Bishop
Heat 2 : Parker, Rickman, Jackson, Stewart
Heat 3 : Warwick, Edmonds (Fell), Hastings (Fell), Wilkinson (Ret)
Heat 4 : Croombs, Huxley, Kendrick, Strecker
Heat 5 : Arthur, Spinks, Patrick, Johnson

Semi-final 1 : Huxley, Rickman, Watson
Semi-final 2 : Tauser, Arthur
Semi-final 3 : Parker, Croombs

Final : Tauser, Huxley, Croombs, Parker (Exc)
