= 1933 Star Riders' Championship =

Seasons
- ← 1932 1934 →

The 1933 Star Riders' Championship was decided on a knockout basis over nine heats.

== Final ==
- 14 September 1933
- Wembley, England

Pos.	Rider	Total
1	(England) Tom Farndon	9
2	(Australia) Ron Johnson	8
3	(Australia) Bluey Wilkinson	6
4	(England) Les Wotton	5
5	(England) Syd Jackson	4
6	(England) Phil Bishop	3
7	(England) Harry Whitfield	3
7	(England) Chun Moore	3
7	(England) Eric Blain	3
10	(Australia) Dicky Case	2
10	(England) Eric Langton	2
12	(Australia) Vic Huxley	1
12	(England) Frank Varey	1
12	(Australia) Jack Chapman	1
12	(England) Frank Goulden	1
16	(England) Norman Parker	0
16	(England) Tommy Croombs	0
16	(England) Stan Greatrex	0
16	(Australia) Jack Sharp	0
16	(England) Colin Watson	0

=== Heat Details ===
Heat 1 : Wotton, Case, Huxley, Croombs
Heat 2 : Farndon, Moore, Varey, Parker
Heat 3 : Blain, Whitfield, Bishop, Sharp
Heat 4 : Wilkinson, Langton, Chapman, Greatrex
Heat 5 : Johnson, Jackson, Goulden, Watson

Semi-final 1 : Farndon, Wotton, Whitfield
Semi-final 2 : Wilkinson, Jackson
Semi-final 3 : Johnson, Bishop, Moore

Final : Farndon, Johnson, Wilkinson
