= 1932 Star Riders' Championship =

Motorcycle speedway competition in 1932

Seasons
- ← 1931 1933 →

The 1932 Star Riders' Championship was the fourth edition of the speedway Star Riders' Championship. The competition was decided on a knockout basis over nine heats.

== Final ==
- 22 September 1932
- Wembley, England

Pos.	Rider	Total
1	(England) Eric Langton	8
2	(Australia) Vic Huxley	7
3	(Australia) Dicky Case	6
4	(England) Gordon Byers	5
5	(England) Jack Parker	4
6	(England) Ginger Lees	3
=7	(England) Les Wotton	2
=7	(England) Roy Dook	2
=7	(Australia) Bert Spencer	2
=7	(England) Frank Varey	2
=7	(England) Tom Farndon	2
=12	(Australia) Frank Arthur	1
=12	(England) Wal Phillips	1
=12	(England) Tommy Croombs	1
=12	(England) Bill Clibbett	1
=16	(England) Norman Parker	0
=16	(Australia) Ron Johnson	0
=16	(England) Syd Jackson	0
=16	(England) Joe Francis	0
=16	(Australia) Bluey Wilkinson	0
=16	(Australia) Eric Collins	0

=== Heat details ===
Heat 1 : Byers, Dook, Arthur
Heat 2 : Case, N Parker (Ret), Johnson (Fell)
Heat 3 : Langton, Wotton, Jackson (Ret)
Heat 4 : Huxley, Spencer, Phillips
Heat 5 : J Parker, Varey, Croombs
Heat 6 : Lees, Farndon, Clibbett

Semi-final 1 : Case, Langton, J Parker
Semi-final 2 : Huxley, Byers, Lees (Fell)

Final : Langton, Huxley, Case (Fell)
