= Lea Bridge Stadium =

Former multi-purpose stadium in London

Coordinates: 51°33′59.8″N 0°02′17″W

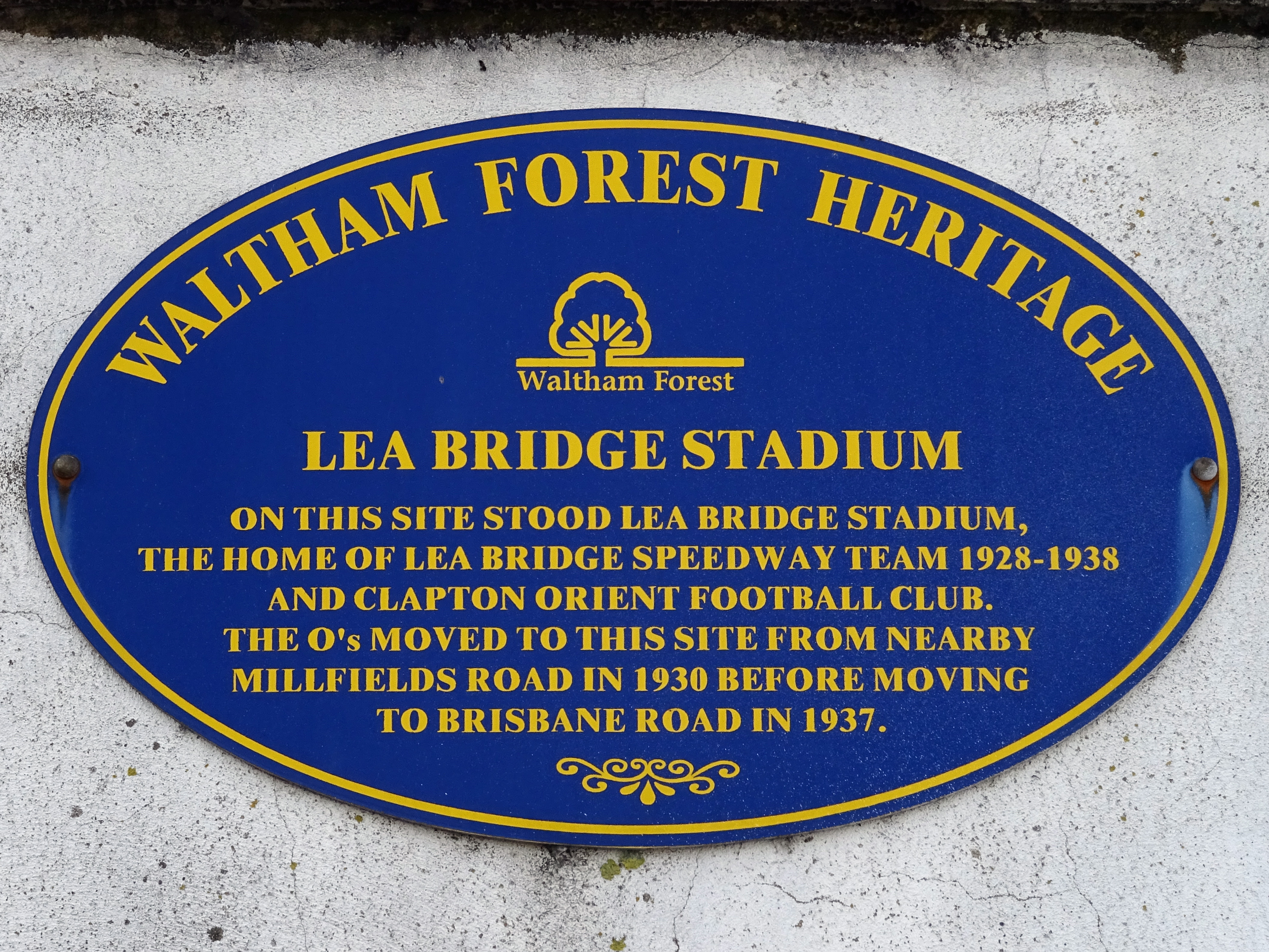
- Plaque commemorating the stadium
- Interactive map of Lea Bridge Stadium
- Location: Leyton, London, England

Tenants
- Lea Bridge (speedway); Clapton Orient (1930–1937)

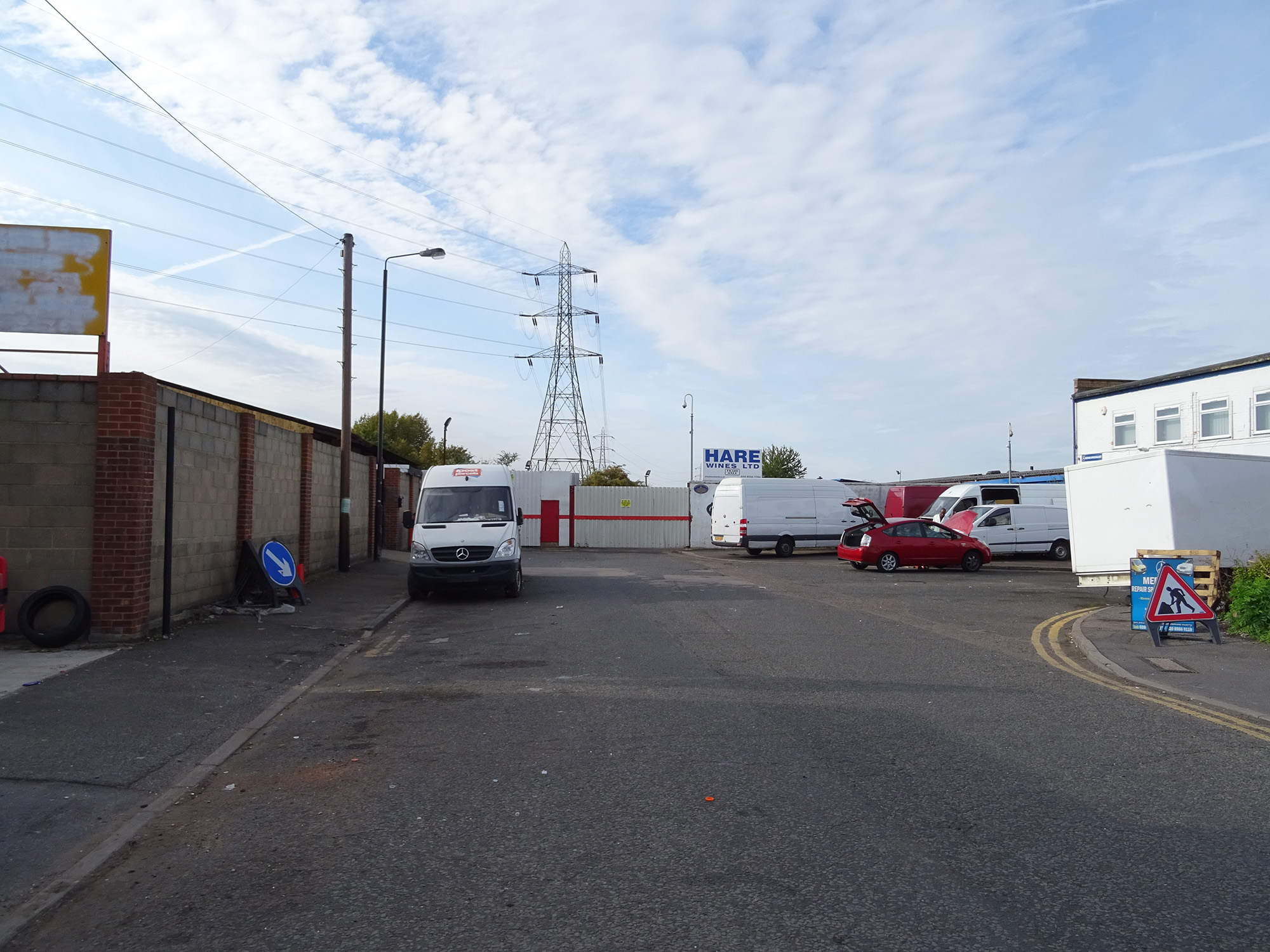
The site in 2017

The Lea Bridge Stadium was a football and speedway stadium on Lea Bridge Road in the Leyton area of London. It was the home ground of Clapton Orient between 1930 and 1937.

== History ==
Speedway was introduced in the summer of 1928 by Motor Speedways following the construction of a purpose-built facility on a ten-acre plot of land. The 33ft wide track was built with a football field on the inside; at the time the stadium could accommodate 40,000 spectators. There was parking for cars and one of the four stadium entrances was directly opposite the Lea Bridge railway station. The first speedway fixture was held on 14 July 1928.

The stadium started hosting football matches in 1930 when Clapton Orient moved to the site, having been forced to leave their Millfields Road ground due to financial problems. At the time that Orient moved to the ground, spectator facilities included a covered stand on the southern side of the ground and embankments around the remainder. The first League match played at the ground was a 3–1 win against Newport County on 3 September 1930 with 5,505 in attendance. A few weeks into the season, the Football League authorities notified the club that the gap between the edge of the pitch and the speedway track fence was too narrow, and that no more matches could be played at the ground until this was rectified. Whilst the works were carried out, Orient played two matches at Wembley Stadium; a 3–0 win over Brentford on 22 November (with an attendance of 10,300) and a 3–1 win against Southend United on 6 December (2,500).

In 1933 the speedway scenes from the film Britannia of Billingsgate were shot at the stadium. It featured some of the leading riders in Britain at the time, including Colin Watson, Arthur Warwick, Gus Kuhn, Tom Farndon, Claude Rye and Ron Johnson.

Further improvements were later made to the ground, including a covered stand on the northern touchline and concrete terracing on the west, north and eastern sides of the stadium. The works increased the capacity to around 20,000, and Orient's record League crowd of 20,400 was set on 13 March 1937 when Millwall were beaten 1–0.

In 1937 Clapton Orient moved to Osborne Road (later renamed Brisbane Road). The stadium continued to be used for speedway for one more season, and then lay derelict until being finally demolished in the 1970s.

The site later became an industrial estate and is commemorated by a blue plaque at nearby Rigg Approach.

== See also ==
- Lea Bridge (speedway)
