= Leicester Stadium (speedway team) =

Club information
- Track address: The Stadium, Blackbird Road, Leicester
- Country: England
- Founded: 1929
- Closed: 1931
- Team manager: Norman Coates
- Team captain: Syd Jackson
- League: English Dirt Track League/Southern League

Club facts
- Track size: 348 yards (318 metres) (1929); 353 yards (323 metres) (1930-31)

Major team honours
Midland Champions	1930

Leicester Stadium were a motorcycle speedway team which operated from 1929 until 1931.

== History ==
Speedway was first staged in Leicester in 1928 and the following year a team based at Leicester Stadium joined the English Dirt Track League. In 1930, the team joined the Southern League. Financial problems meant that the team failed to complete the 1931 season, with Coventry taking over the remaining fixtures in late May. League speedway was later briefly revived at the stadium in 1937.

== Notable riders ==
Notable Stadium riders include team captain Syd Jackson, Cyril "Squib" Burton, Billy Elmore, Alby Taylor, and John "Slider" Shuttleworth.

== Season summary ==
Year and league	Position	Notes
1929 Speedway English Dirt Track League	7th	
1930 Speedway Southern League	10th	
1931 Speedway Southern League	10th	withdrew, fixtures taken over by Coventry

== See also ==
- Speedway in Leicester
- Leicester Stadium
- Beaumont Park Stadium
