= Mick Murphy (speedway rider) =

Australian speedway rider

- Born: 1911; Scotland
- Died: 1998; Australia
- Nationality: Australian

Career history
- 1931: Stamford Bridge Pensioners
- 1931–1932: Wimbledon Dons
- 1933–1934: Plymouth Panthers
- 1935: Hackney Wick Wolves
- 1935–1936: West Ham Hammers
- 1937–1938: New Cross Rangers

Individual honours
- 1931: New South Wales State Champion
- 1937: Western Australian State Champion

John Glass (1911 – 1998) was a motorcycle speedway rider from Australia. During his speedway career he rode under the pseudonym Mick Murphy.

== Career ==
Glass was born in Scotland but emigrated to Perth in Australia with his parents as a child. In 1925, at the age of 14, he rode up to the Claremont Speedway track and asked for a trial. He had borrowed his father's helmet so asked that his name not be released. Therefore, the name Mick Murphy (the Irish champion) was created. He won the 1930/31 New South Wales Individual Speedway Championship.

Murphy arrived in the United Kingdom from Australia to race in the Britain during the 1931 season after signing for the Stamford Bridge Pensioners. He also made an appearance for the Wimbledon Dons during 1931 and rode in the final of the National Trophy for Stamford Bridge, losing out to Wembley Lions.

The 1932 season saw the formation of the National League and Murphy signed for Wimbledon but was positioned mainly at reserve. He rode in Sweden and Germany in early 1932 and then confused reporters by switching to his real name John Glass for the 1933 season with Plymouth Panthers.

In 1935, Murphy represented the Australia national speedway team in four of the five tests that season. In the 1935 Speedway National League, Murphy started the season with Hackney Wick Wolves before transferring to West Ham Hammers in June.

In the winter of 1936/37, Murphy won the Western Australia Championship. He finished his UK career with New Cross Rangers.

== Players cigarette cards ==
Murphy is listed as number 32 of 50 in the 1930s Player's cigarette card collection.
