= Reg West =

Australian motorcycle speedway rider

- Born: 24 April 1907; Launceston, Tasmania, Australia
- Died: 21 April 1968 (aged 60); Australia
- Nationality: Australian

Career history
- 1931: Manchester (Belle Vue)

Individual honours
- 1930: Australian Solo Championship (2 miles)

Reginald Aldgate West also known as Reg Thorne (24 April 1907 – 21 April 1968) was a motorcycle speedway rider from Australia.

== Biography ==
West, born in Launceston, Tasmania and won the 2 miles Australian Solo Championship in 1930.

West travelled to the United Kingdom for the first time in 1931 and later began his British leagues career riding for the Manchester Belle Vue team that took over the fixtures of Harringary Canaries following their withdrawal during the 1931 Speedway Southern League season. He averaged 6.00.

As was the bizarre practice by a small number of speedway riders at the time, West rode as Reg Thorne in later years, signing for West Ham Hammers in 1933 but not actually appearing for them.
