= Speedway in Leicester =

Motorcycle speedway was first staged in Leicester in 1928. It has continued on and off until the present day, with Leicester Lions currently competing in the SGB Championship and Leicester Lion Cubs competing in the National League (speedway)

== Leicester Stadium ==
The first speedway to be staged in Leicester was on a dirt track constructed inside the greyhound racing track at Leicester Stadium on Parker Drive in 1928. The team based there joined the English Dirt Track League in 1929 finishing 5th, with Syd Jackson and Billy Elmore the leading riders. The team were referred to as 'Leicester Stadium' to differentiate them from the other team that operated in Leicester, the Leicester Super team.

The team competed in the Southern League in 1930, with Cyril "Squib" Burton emerging at the team's top rider. The Stadium team completed only part of the 1931 season.

== Leicester Super ==
A new track was constructed at the Leicester Super Speedway on Melton Road, which opened in 1929. A team based there competed in the Northern League in both 1930 and 1931, but failed to complete either season.

== Leicester Hounds ==
Speedway was revived on a relaid track at Leicester Stadium in 1937, with Leicester Hounds competing in the Provincial League.

== Leicester Hunters ==
Leicester Hunters formed in 1948, and began competing in the National League in 1949. They competed in the top division of British speedway between 1957 and 1961, before dropping down to the newly formed Provincial League in 1962, which was their final season.

== Leicester Lions ==
Leicester Lions began in 1968, when the team transferred from Long Eaton. They competed in the British League until their closure in 1983, when they lost their home after the stadium was sold.

The Lions name was revived in the 2000s, with occasional challenge matches before the team returned to league competition at a new stadium called the Beaumont Park Stadium in Beaumont Leys in 2011.

== Indoor speedway ==
Speedway was also staged on an indoor track at Granby Halls. The first event was the Midland Individual Championship in January 1972, which was won by James Bond.

== Around Leicestershire ==
Wilf Plant set up a training track near Melton Mowbray in 1936. Speedway was also staged at the greyhound stadium on Saxby Road in Melton Mowbray in 1949. The Melton Mowbray Motorcycle Club, chaired by Plant, staged several meetings on a cinder track there.

Paddy Mills set up a training track in a field in Syston in 1952, running training sessions attended by several riders who went on to represent Leicester Hunters, including Ivor Brown and Bryan Elliott.
