= Wally Kilmister =

New Zealand speedway rider

- Born: 30 April 1907; Wellington, New Zealand
- Died: 18 March 1973 (aged 65); Rotorua, New Zealand
- Nationality: New Zealander

Career history
- 1930–1938: Wembley Lions
- 1939: Southampton Saints

Individual honours
- 1936: New Zealand Champion

Team honours
- 1930, 1931: Southern League Champion
- 1932: National League Champion
- 1930, 1932, 1933: London Cup Winner
- 1931, 1932: National Trophy Winner

Wallace Stewart Kilmister (30 April 1907 – 18 March 1973), better known as Wally Kilmister, was an international speedway rider.

== Career summary ==
Kilmister first rode in grasstrack in 1925, before taking up speedway. He began riding at the Kilbirnie track in Wellington in 1929 before travelling to England and joining the Wembley Lions in 1930. After he spent the English winter in Australia, he returned to Wembley and would continue to ride for them until 1938.

In 1935, Kilmister rode in the Star Riders' Championship and in 1936 he won the New Zealand Championship. He was also a member of New Zealand and Colonies teams in the 1930s. At one time, he also held the New Zealand land speed record with an average of 107 mph.

== Players cigarette cards ==
Kilmister is listed as number 23 of 50 in the 1930s Player's cigarette card collection.

== Personal life ==
Kilmister opened a model and adjoining sports shop in Neeld Parade, near to Wembley Stadium during the 1930s which he was involved in until his death in 1973.

After retiring from speedway, Kilmister also lived in Taupō, New Zealand where he had a motorcycle, lawnmower and chainsaw shop.
