= Dick Smythe =

Australian speedway rider

- Born: 17 August 1907; Brisbane, Queensland, Australia
- Died: 27 February 1967 (aged 59); Brisbane, Queensland, Australia
- Nationality: Australian

Career history
- 1931–1932: Stamford Bridge Pensioners
- 1935: Wembley Lions
- 1936–1937: Harringay Tigers

Team honours
- 1932: National Association Trophy

Richard Charles Smythe (17 August 1907 – 27 February 1967) was a motorcycle speedway rider from Australia. He would earn ten Australia national speedway team international caps.

== Career ==
Smythe a former jockey and butcher's roundsman was an early pioneer speedway rider in Australia and the United Kingdom. He first arrived in the UK during 1928 and rode in various exhibition matches. He returned to Australia for 1929 and 1930 and won the 1930 Golden Sash and First Division handicap during 1930.

Smythe's first taste of league speedway in Britain was for the Stamford Bridge Pensioners, when he joined the London club for the 1931 Speedway Southern League season. On the formation of the National League in 1932, he was retained by the Pensioners and won the National Association Trophy with them.

Smythe spent 1933 and 1934 in his native Australia before being signed by Wembley Lions for the 1935 Speedway National League. The following season, he moved clubs after joining Harringay Tigers, his 1936 season was ended following a crash in which Smythe suffered spinal injuries. His last season in Britain was in 1937, again with Harringay.

== Players cigarette cards ==
Smythe is listed as number 42 of 50 in the 1930s Player's cigarette card collection.
