= Charlie Blacklock =

New Zealand speedway rider

- Born: 1908; Christchurch, New Zealand
- Died: 27 January 1935 (aged 26); Christchurch, New Zealand
- Nationality: New Zealander

Career history

Great Britain
- 1931: Crystal Palace Glaziers
- 1931–1932: Stamford Bridge Pensioners
- 1933: Nottingham
- 1934: Harringay Tigers

Individual honours
- 1933: New Zealand champion

Team honours
- 1932: National Association Trophy

Charles Edward Blacklock (1908 – 27 January 1935) was a New Zealand motorcycle speedway rider.

== Career ==
Blacklock was one of the early speedway pioneer riders who travelled to the United Kingdom from New Zealand. He was also a rugby player and just missed selection for the New Zealand side that toured England in 1929. He started racing in the British leagues during the 1931 Speedway Southern League, when riding for the Stamford Bridge Pensioners and Crystal Palace Glaziers.

In 1933, Blacklock became the champion of New Zealand after winning the New Zealand Solo Championship.

After joining Harringay Tigers for the 1934 Speedway National League Blacklock was due to return to Britain in 1935 but his career came to an untimely end when he was killed in a track crash at Christchurch, after suffering head injuries.

== See also ==
Rider deaths in motorcycle speedway
