= Frank Pearce (speedway rider) =

Australian motorcycle speedway rider

- Born: 4 January 1901; Chiswick, London
- Died: 20 January 1987 (aged 86); Toowoomba, Queensland, Australia
- Nationality: Australian

Career history
- 1931–1931: High Beech
- 1932, 1934: Plymouth Tigers

Individual honours
- 1928: Queensland State Champion
- 1929: Australian Champion (4 lap)

Frank Charles Pearce (4 January 1901 – 20 January 1987) was an English born Australian motorcycle speedway rider. He was champion of Australia (4 lap) in 1929 and earned eight international caps for the Australia national speedway team.

== Biography ==
Pearce, born in Chiswick, London, emigrated to Australia shortly after his ninth birthday in 1910. He became a mechanic and entered the new sport of speedway. He was one of the early pioneers of the sport, winning the golden helmet three times before travelling to the United Kingdom in 1928 to take part in some of the first races ever staged in the country.

Pearce raced the 1928 Australian season and enhanced his reputation further by winning the 1928, 4 lap Australian Solo Championship, at the Davies Park. He decided not to return to Britain for the 1929 and 1930 seasons but agreed to sign for High Beech for his first season of league racing, during the 1931 Speedway Southern League. His first season was a tough one, he was made captain but during his first meeting for the team he suffered an injury and only managing to record a 3.83 season average.

The following season in 1932, Pearce moved to race for Plymouth Tigers, where he joined a team full of other Australians. The season was much better and Pearce averaged 6.37. Despite a better season, he would miss the 1933 season before returning to Plymouth for the 1934 Speedway National League season. After the 1934 season Plymouth folded and Pearce returned to Australia. He was put sale for the 1935 season but decided not to travel.

During World War II, Pearce was a munitions worker.
