= Reg Bounds =

English motorcycle speedway rider

- Born: 21 October 1907; Kilburn, London
- Died: 30 November 1977 (aged 70); Brent, Greater London
- Nationality: British (English)

Career history
- 1929: Southampton Saints
- 1929-1931: West Ham Hammers
- 1932-1933: Wembley Lions

Team honours
- 1932: National Trophy
- 1933: London Cup

Philip Reginald Bounds (21 October 1907 – 30 November 1977) was an international motorcycle speedway rider from England. He earned two international caps for the England national speedway team.

== Biography ==
Bounds was born in 1907 in Kilburn, London. He and his brother Cecil Bounds both started riding during some of the earliest days of speedway in Britain and in 1929, they both signed for Southampton Saints for the 1929 Speedway Southern League season. Reg finished runner-up in the Silver Gauntlet in 1929 around the same time that he moved to ride for the West Ham Hammers.

Bounds remained with West Ham during 1930 and was joined by his brother at the London club, improving his average to 8.33. His improvement was despite the fact that he was involved in a serious coach crash, when the team were travelling to a fixture in Leicester. His performances towards the latter part of the season in particular ensured his selection in the West Ham team for the following season. During the 1931 Speedway Southern League, he became one of the league's leading riders posting a 9.32 official average. His form led to a call up for the England team in August, for the test match series against Australia.

In 1932, the champions Wembley Lions signed Bounds from West Ham for the 1933 Speedway National League. The transfer did not go down well with the West Ham fans, who saw Bounds as their best and favourite rider. It transpired that his father had requested the move for business reasons (the family were based near Wembley). He duly helped the team win the treble of National League, National Trophy and London Cup, despite a crash in July which left him unconscious and missing the remainder of the season.

Bounds' return from injury in 1933 resulted in poor form, probably as a consequence of the accident the previous year but he did win a second London Cup with Wembley. He travelled to Australia for the 1933/1934 test series but suffered another crash, attributed to his earlier accident. He intended to ride for Wembley in 1934, but then decided to retire and devote his time to the garage business in Kilburn.
