= Billy Lamont (speedway rider) =

Australian speedway rider

- Born: 12 August 1908; Newcastle, New South Wales, Australia
- Died: 16 November 1988 (aged 80); Merrylands, New South Wales, Australia
- Nationality: Australian

Career history
- 1930–1932: Wimbledon Dons
- 1933: Clapton Saints
- 1935–1936: Wembley Lions
- 1936: Plymouth Panthers
- 1937: Nottingham
- 1938: Sheffield
- 1939: Newcastle

Individual honours
- 1931, 1935: Dirt Track Championnat du Monde

Team honours
- 1937: Provincial Trophy
- 1937: Provincial League Coronation Cup

Wilfred Steward Lamont (12 August 1908 – 16 November 1988) was an Australian motorcycle speedway rider considered to be one of the original pioneer riders in Australia and the United Kingdom.

== Career ==
Lamont was racing during the first days of speedway during 1924, racing at West Maitland. He arrived in Britain in 1928 and became a star of the speedway circuits and gained the nickname Cyclone Billy Lamont. His first league season was with Wimbledon Dons during the 1930 Speedway Southern League season.

Lamont won the first of his two Dirt Track Championnat du Monde titles (an early version of the Speedway World Championship and rival of the Star Riders' Championship) at Stade Buffalo in Paris during 1931.

In 1932, Lamont spent a second season with Wimbledon and recorded his best test match result for the Australia national speedway team. He would go on to earn 15 caps for Australia. He stayed with Wimbledon on the formation of the National League in 1932 before joining Clapton Saints in 1933.

On his return to British speedway in 1935, Lamont joined Wembley Lions and later doubled up with Plymouth Panthers in the 1936 Provincial Speedway League. He would spend further seasons in Britain riding for Nottingham, Sheffield and Newcastle until the outbreak of World War II.

== Players cigarette cards ==
Lamont is listed as number 26 of 50 in the 1930s Player's cigarette card collection.
