= Norman Evans (speedway rider) =

British motorcycle speedway rider

- Born: 13 August 1905; Middlesbrough, England
- Died: July 1981 (aged 75); Northallerton, England
- Nationality: British (English)

Career history
- 1929: Middlesbrough
- 1930–1933, 1935: Wembley Lions
- 1934–1935: Harringay Tigers
- 1935–1937, 1939: New Cross Lambs/Tamers/Rangers
- 1938–1939: Wimbledon Dons
- 1946–1948: Newcastle Brough/Diamonds
- 1949: Ashfield Giants

Team honours
- 1932: National League
- 1930, 1931: Southern League
- 1931, 1932, 1938: National Trophy
- 1930, 1932, 1933, 1937, 1938, 1939: London Cup

Norman Evans (13 August 1905 – July 1981) was an international motorcycle speedway rider from England. He earned one international cap for the England national speedway team.

== Biography ==
Evans, born in Middlesbrough rode in the pioneer years of British speedway beginning his British leagues career riding for Middlesbrough during the 1929 Speedway English Dirt Track League and became the team's captain.

Evans' performances during 1929 were noticed by the Wembley Lions and they signed him for the 1930 Speedway Southern League. The team became the first 'star' team, winning the league and London Cup double and the 1931 league and National Trophy double.

On the formation of the first National League in 1932, Evans helped Wembley claim the treble of league, national trophy and London Cup before Belle Vue Aces arrived on the scene to challenge Wembley's domination. In 1934, Evans was released by Wembley and he was allocated to the Harringay Tigers. After starting the 1935 season with Harringay, he went on to ride for Wembley again, but at the end of August joined the New Cross Lambs.

Evans spent two more seasons with New Cross, known as the Tamers in 1936 and the Rangers in 1937, where he won the London Cup with the latter. During the 1938 season and 1939 season he won three more trophies with Wimbledon Dons.

World War II robbed Evans of six years of racing before he joined Newcastle Brough for the 1946 Speedway Northern League. He was still able to score heavily in the second division with Newcastle from 1946 to 1948.

Evans' final season was in 1949, when he captained the newly formed Ashfield Giants in Glasgow. His retirement was prompted by a crash he was involved in during September 1949, that injured eight spectators when two bikes tangled together.
