= High Beech Speedway =

Motorcycle speedway team

High Beech

Club information
- Track address: High Beach; Loughton; Epping Forest District; Essex
- Country: England
- Founded: 1928
- Closed: 1931
- League: Southern League

High Beech Speedway, also known as Kings Oak Speedway (because of its location by the Kings Oaks Hotel), is a defunct British motorcycle speedway team that operated between 1928 and 1931 and was based at High Beach, Loughton, Epping Forest District, Essex, England.

== History ==
High Beech competed in the 1930 Speedway Southern League, finishing 11th. The club returned the following season and finished sixth in the 1931 Speedway Southern League.

It was inevitable that without a stadium as such, the club would not be able to compete with the bigger teams, and they duly folded after the 1930 season. The venue is famous within the speedway world due to the fact that it held the first known speedway meeting (an oval cinder circuit) in Britain on 19 February 1928.

== Notable riders ==
- Billy Dallison
- Jack Sharp

== Season summary ==
Year and league	Position	Notes
1930 Speedway Southern League	11th	
1931 Speedway Southern League	6th	
