= Arnie Hansen =

Australian motorcycle speedway rider

- Born: 2 April 1907; Kalgoorlie, Australia
- Died: 13 April 1984 (aged 77); Adelaide, Australia
- Nationality: Australian

Career history
- 1930–1931: Southampton Saints

Individual honours
- 1932: Australian Solo Championship

Arnold Hans Martin Hansen (2 April 1907 – 13 April 1984) was a motorcycle speedway rider from Australia. He was champion of Australia in 1932 and earned three international caps for the Australia national speedway team.

== Biography ==
Hansen, born in Kalgoorlie, first raced in the United Kingdom during 1930. He won the Finsbury Handicap at Harringay Stadium before commencing his British leagues career riding for Southampton Saints during the 1930 Speedway Southern League season. He enjoyed a good season averaging 8.81 and helping Southampton finish runner-up in the league campaign. He also broke several track records and represented Australia in a test match against England.

The following season in 1931, Hansen remained with Southampton but did not perform as well as the previous year. He returned to Australia and won the 1932, three lap Australian Solo Championship at Wayville Showgrounds.

Hansen continued to ride for an Adelaide team but despite several instances of British clubs looking to sign him, he did not return to ride in England again.
