= Harold Hastings (speedway rider) =

Australian motorcycle speedway rider

- Born: 13 July 1906; Ipswich, Queensland
- Died: 5 November 1965 (aged 59); Queensland, Australia
- Nationality: Australian

Career history
- 1930–1931: Lea Bridge
- 1932: Belle Vue Aces

Individual honours
- 1929, 1930: Queensland State Champion
- 1931: Australian Solo Championship (2 lap)

Harold John Hastings (13 July 1906 – 5 November 1965) was a motorcycle speedway rider from Australia. He was champion of Australia (2 lap) in 1931 and earned several international caps for the Australia national speedway team.

== Biography ==
Hastings, born in Ipswich, Queensland, was one of the many Australians that travelled over to the United Kingdom in the early 1930, as pioneers of speedway. He was recruited by Lea Bridge and his first season was racing in the 1930 Speedway Southern League. In April 1930, he represented Australia against England.

Hastings returned for the Australian season and enhanced his reputation by winning the 1931, 2 lap Australian Solo Championship, at the Melbourne Motordrome before signing for a second season with Lea Bridge.

During the 1931 season, Hastings improved his official average by recording a 6.80, although his league average was slightly down to 6.20 but continued to represent Australia in test matches and rode in the 1931 Star Riders' Championship.

The following season in 1932, Hastings moved north to ride for the Belle Vue Aces, which happened to be his last season in Britain before returning to Australia. His season with the Manchester club had been affected by a broken ankle that he raced with, protecting it in a custom made steel shoe.
