= Harry Whitfield =

British motorcycle speedway rider

- Born: 9 May 1908; Middlesbrough, England
- Died: 14 September 1988 (aged 80)
- Nationality: British (English)

Career history
- 1929-1935: Wembley Lions
- 1936-1937: Harringay Racers
- 1939: Sheffield Tigers

Individual honours
- 1930: Scottish Champion

Team honours
- 1932: National League Champion
- 1930, 1931: Southern League Champion
- 1931, 1932: National Trophy Winner
- 1930, 1932, 1933: London Cup Winner

Henry Whitfield (9 May 1908 - 14 September 1988) was a British motorcycle speedway rider who went on to manage Middlesbrough Bears. He earned one international caps for the England national speedway team.

== Career ==
Originally from Middlesbrough, Whitfield was one of the top British riders of the early 1930s, riding for Wembley Lions and also for the England national team, competing in the Test series against Australia in 1931. He was one of the first British riders to challenge the dominance of Australian riders. He was also one of the first riders recognised as developing team riding (where both riders attempt to hold the front of the race together), forming a successful partnership with George Greenwood.

Whitfield won the Scottish Championship in 1930 and an unofficial World Championship event at the Sydney Showground Speedway in Australia on 4 March 1933. Whitfield had earlier won the first qualifying round for the 1933 Final at the Claremont Speedway in Perth, Western Australia on 3 December 1932. All four qualifying rounds were held in Australia.

During World War II, while serving with the Royal Air Force in North Africa, Whitfield created makeshift tracks in the desert with petrol tins as crash barriers and organised racing with dispatch riders. This led to meetings being held in the Trani Stadium, in South-Eastern Italy in 1944 and 1945.

After the war, Whitfield became manager of the Middlesbrough Bears, leading them to the Northern League title in 1946.
