= Eric Collins (speedway rider) =

Australian speedway rider (1910–1954)

- Born: 5 October 1910; Brisbane, Australia
- Died: 23 February 1954 (aged 43); Brisbane, Australia
- Nationality: Australian

Career history
- 1931: Lea Bridge
- 1932: Plymouth Tigers
- 1935–1939: Wimbledon Dons
- 1936: Bristol Bulldogs

Team honours
- 1938: National Trophy
- 1938, 1939: London Cup

Eric Francis Collins (5 October 1910 – 23 February 1954) was an Australian international motorcycle speedway rider who rode in the early days of speedway in the United Kingdom.

== Career ==
Collins rode for Lea Bridge during the 1931 Speedway Southern League. In 1932, he then switched to Plymouth Tigers, after the formation of the National League.

It was during the 1932 season that Collins also reached the final of the 1932 Star Riders' Championship, which was considered at the time to be the World Championship of speedway.

After staying in Australia for two seasons, Collins joined Wimbledon Dons and rode for them from 1935 to 1939. He also doubled up for Bristol Bulldogs in 1936. He won the National Trophy with Wimbledon during the 1938 Speedway National League, where he top scored during the home leg of the final.

== Players cigarette cards ==
Collins is listed as number 9 of 50 in the 1930s Player's cigarette card collection.
