= Colin Watson (speedway rider) =

British speedway rider

- Born: 28 September 1898; Ilford, London
- Died: 13 June 1963 (aged 64)
- Nationality: British (English)

Career history
- 1929: White City
- 1930: Harringay Canaries
- 1930-1938: Wembley Lions
- 1938: Sheffield
- 1938-1939, 1946: West Ham Hammers

Team honours
- 1932: National League Champion
- 1930, 1931: Southern League Champion
- 1931, 1932: National Trophy Winner
- 1932, 1933: London Cup Winner

Colin Watson (28 September 1898 – 13 June 1963) was a successful British motorcycle speedway rider from the sport's early years in the late 1920s and 1930s. He earned nine international caps for the England national speedway team.

== Biography ==
Born in Ilford, Essex, Watson was involved from the earliest days on British speedway, taking part in the early meetings held at High Beach in 1928. He joined White City in 1929 and Harringay Canaries and Wembley Lions in 1930, playing a leading role in the team that dominated the sport in the early 1930s. He was a finalist in the Star Riders' Championship five times between 1929 and 1934. He was selected for the England team to face Australia in Test series in 1931, 1932, 1933, and 1934, also captaining the team. He suffered a broken leg in 1935 that kept him out of the sport until 1937. In 1938 he moved on to the West Ham Hammers, also spending a period with Sheffield Tigers.

Watson was allocated back to West Ham after the end of World War II. On 13 July 1946, during a second-half scratch race after a match between the Odsal Boomerangs and West Ham, he was critically injured in a crash when he hit a lighting standard and was dragged along the track by his bike, suffering a fractured skull and a punctured lung. He lay unconscious in a Bradford hospital before recovering consciousness four weeks later. Just one week earlier on 6 July, Albert Rosenfeld Jr. had been critically injured at the same track but died ten days later. The accident ended Watson's career at the age of 47 and he had impaired eyesight as a result. He took up the job of inspecting the pits at West Ham afterwards.

Watson earned nine caps for the England national team.

After his racing career, Watson ran a successful car hire business in Ilford and in 1963 took on the role of machine examiner at New Cross.

== Film appearance ==
The speedway scenes from the 1933 film Britannia of Billingsgate were shot at Hackney Wick Stadium and featured some of the leading riders in Britain at the time including Colin Watson, Arthur Warwick, Gus Kuhn, Tom Farndon, Claude Rye and Ron Johnson.

== Players cigarette cards ==
Watson is listed as number 47 of 50 in the 1930s Player's cigarette card collection.
