= Jack Sharp (speedway rider) =

Australian speedway rider

- Born: 20 March 1909; Boulder, Western Australia, Australia
- Died: 1974 (aged 64–65); Mandurah, Australia
- Nationality: Australian

Career history
- 1930: High Beech
- 1931, 1935–1937: Wimbledon Dons
- 1933–1934: Plymouth Tigers

John Reginald Sharp (20 March 1909 – 1974) was a motorcycle speedway rider from Australia.

== Career ==
Sharp rode in Western Australia for Johnnie Hoskins before going to Singapore and then the United Kingdom in 1930. He joined High Beech Speedway for the 1930 Speedway Southern League season.

Sharp made his debut for the Australia national speedway team in 1930 and would go on to earn 14 international caps in total and captain the nation from 1936 to 1938.

In 1931, Sharp made a couple of appearances for Wimbledon Dons before racing mainly at the Greenford Speedway and in 1932, rode grasstrack. During the 1933 and 1934 seasons, he signed for the Plymouth Tigers, winning the 1933 West of England Championship and topping the averages for the Devon team during the 1934 Speedway National League. While a Plymouth rider, he married on 29 September 1934 in London.

The following season in 1935, Sharp broke into the Wimbledon first team and was a regular throughout the season for them. He finished his UK career after two more seasons with Wimbledon but broke his leg in June 1937 ending his season early. In 1938, he continued to captain Australia but did not return to Britain.

== Players cigarette cards ==
Sharp is listed as number 40 of 50 in the 1930s Player's cigarette card collection.
