= Bill Clibbett =

English speedway rider

- Born: 7 December 1908; Keynsham, Somerset, England
- Died: 26 September 1967 (aged 58); Newport, Wales
- Nationality: British (English)

Career history
- 1930–1931: Harringay Canaries
- 1931: Wimbledon Dons
- 1932–1934: Plymouth Tigers
- 1935–1937: Hackney Wick Wolves
- 1938–1939: Bristol Bulldogs

Team honours
- 1936: London Cup Winner

William Olaf Clibbett (7 December 1908 – 26 September 1967) was an international motorcycle speedway rider who rode in the early days of speedway in the United Kingdom.

== Career ==
Clibbett rode for Harringay Canaries during the 1930 Speedway Southern League and continued to ride for them the following season. In 1932, he then switched to Plymouth Tigers, after the formation of the National League.

It was during the 1932 season that Clibbett also reached the final of the 1932 Star Riders' Championship, which was considered at the time to be the World Championship of speedway.

Clibbett remained with Plymouth for three years before riding for Hackney Wick Wolves from 1935 to 1937 and Bristol Bulldogs from 1938 to 1939. He retired in 1939.

At retirement, Clibbett had earned one international cap for the England national speedway team.

== Players cigarette cards ==
Clibbett is listed as number 8 of 50 in the 1930s Player's cigarette card collection.
