= Ray Tauscher =

American speedway rider

Ray Tauscher/Tauser
- Born: 19 October 1905; Portland, Oregon
- Died: 23 September 1981 (aged 75); Portland, Oregon
- Nationality: American (United States)

Career history
- 1929: Wembley Lions
- 1930-1932: Wimbledon Dons

Individual honours
- 1931: Star Riders' Champion
- 1931: Australian Champion

Ferdinand Raymond Tauscher (19 October 1905 – 23 September 1981) (also known as Tauser in international press) was an international motorcycle speedway rider.

== Early life ==
Tauscher was born in Portland, Oregon, to Austrian immigrants Wenzel and Anastasia Tauscher on September 19, 1905. His childhood home was 880 East Burnside in Portland, now the location of the Jupiter Hotel. He went to Washington High School in Southeast Portland where he excelled in athletics. His family was active at the Multnomah Athletic Club where Ray was a champion weightlifter and avid golfer. His interest in motorcycles began in 1920 when he attended motorcycle races on the half-mile oval at the Gresham Speed Bowl.

== Career ==
Tauscher started motorcycle racing in 1923 and two years later he was winning at circle tracks, hill climbs, and endurance runs culminating with the Northwest Championship. Continuing to star on northwest racetracks. Ray also performed parachute jumping, won golf tournaments, and earned light heavyweight wrestling titles.

With his racing reputation established in the Northwest, Tauscher was recruited in 1929 by Johnnie Hoskins and the London Star newspaper to travel and race motorcycles in England where he set a new one-lap record of 36.81 mph racing at Wembley. He represented America in competitions pitted against England and Australian riders as well as for individual trophies and made several appearances for Wembley Lions. He raced against the top riders at tracks across the UK with the finals held at London's Wembley Stadium. In 1930, he joined the Wimbledon Dons for the 1930 Speedway Southern League and after the 1930 British season he competed in Australia and New Zealand.

On December 13, 1930, Taushcer won the World Dirt Track Derby in Brisbane, Australia at the Davies Park Speedway, and on February 14, 1931, he won the Australian Solo Championship at the Wayville Showground in Adelaide, Australia.

Tauscher returned to England for a third season in 1931 riding for Wimbledon again and won the 1931 Star Riders' Championship (the unofficial World Championship) at Wembley Stadium in front of 80,000 people on 18 September 1931. He raced against Europe’s riders taking home the German, French, Danish and Italian Championships. He was noted in the press for holding four international championship titles in a 12-month period. As the world’s top rider, he drew the large crowds as he was revered by fans, respected by sportswriters, and was often described as a well-rounded sportsman.

== Later Years and Retirement ==
When Tauscher returned to the UK in 1932, English laws governing foreign “entertainers” barred him from returning to the UK. He went on the European circuit winning championships across the continent. Injuries sustained during his ascent to the racing throne forced Tauscher to return to America in 1934. He raced in California in 1935 and 1936 with mild success, after which he retired from racing in 1938 after suffering a broken shoulder. But he never lost his love of motorcycle racing. He was active managing racetracks in California, New Jersey, New York, and Toronto showing speedway addicts the exciting mode of racing that he brought to the cinder track. Ray took over management of the Portland, Oregon Jantzen Beach Arena racetrack in 1947 where he supported new racers, promoted events, and hosted racers from Australia to thrill local crowds. Tauscher worked for the US Post Service for 38 years starting in 1934 as chief financial examiner. He was also a line supervisor at the Portland Meadows racetrack for 28 years and was a championship golfer with a six handicap. He was a member of the Waverly Masonic Lodge, Portland Elks Club and represented Portland at Toastmaster events. Tauscher died in 1981 at the age of 74 from brain cancer in his hometown of Portland.
