= Charlie Spinks =

Australian motorcycle speedway rider

- Born: 9 April 1904; Singleton, New South Wales, Australia
- Died: 16 October 1987 (aged 83)
- Nationality: Australian

Career history
- 1930–1931: Lea Bridge
- 1932, 1936–1939: West Ham Hammers
- 1946: Newcastle Brough

Team honours
- 1937: League champion
- 1938: A.C.U Cup

Charles Augustus Spinks (9 April 1904 – 16 October 1987) was an international motorcycle speedway rider from Australia. He earned 26 international caps for the Australia national speedway team.

== Biography ==
Spinks, born in Singleton, New South Wales began a career as a bricklayer before riding in the pioneer years of Australian and British speedway. He was riding as early as 1923 for Johnnie Hoskins in exhibition events. In 1928, a contingent of Australian riders arrived in Britain to demonstrate the new sport.

Spinks returned to England for a second season in 1930, after deciding to stay in Australia during 1929. He was signed by Lea Bridge, where he began his British leagues career during the 1930 Speedway Southern League season. He topped the team averages and remained with London club for the 1931 season.

In 1932, the northern and southern leagues merged to form the National League and he signed for West Ham Hammers but he suffered a serious injury and missed part of the season. He did not return to England again until the 1936 season and was reported as being a baker in a village in North Queensland. His time out of the sport came at a cost and he could only post a 3.33 average. However, the following three seasons saw improvement and the achievement of reaching the Championship round of the 1937 Individual Speedway World Championship. He also won the 1937 Speedway National League title with West Ham.

After an enforced six-year break because of World War II, Spinks returned to race for Newcastle Diamonds, where he spent two seasons in 1946 and 1948 before retiring.
