= Arthur Warwick =

British motorcycle speedway rider

- Born: 18 August 1908; East Ham, London, England
- Died: 7 March 1982 (aged 73)
- Nationality: British (English)

Career history
- 1929–1932: Stamford Bridge Pensioners
- 1933: Wimbledon Dons
- 1933: Clapton Saints
- 1934–1935: West Ham Hammers

Team honours
- 1929: Southern League Champion
- 1932: National Association Trophy

Arthur Ernest Warwick (18 August 1908 – 7 March 1982) was an international motorcycle speedway rider from England. He earned seven international caps for the England national speedway team.

== Biography ==
Warwick, born in East Ham, London, rode in the pioneer years of British speedway beginning his British leagues career riding for Stamford Bridge Pensioners during the 1929 Speedway Southern League season, the inaugural season of motorcycle speedway in the United Kingdom. He remained at Stamford Bridge for four seasons, following them into the National League in 1932, when the Southern and Northern leagues merged. He helped Stamford Bridge win the 1932 National Association Trophy.

Despite the success by Stamford Bridge during the 1932 season, the team dropped out of the league and the management at Wimbledon Dons brought Warwick into their team for the season, only for Wimbledon to then replace him with Syd Jackson shortly afterwards. Warwick was disillusioned by the situation and considered leaving the sport but he did help out the Clapton Saints as an injury replacement but was not allowed to sign for them permanently.

In 1934, Warwick signed for West Ham Hammers on loan from Wimbledon (because he was on their retained list) where he spent the last two years of his speedway career.

Warwick retired to take up coaching and promotion at the rebuilt Dagenham track in Ripple Road and raced side-cars before going into team promotion.

== Film appearance ==
The speedway scenes from the 1933 film Britannia of Billingsgate were shot at Hackney Wick Stadium and featured some of the leading riders in Britain at the time including Warwick, Colin Watson, Tom Farndon, Gus Kuhn, Claude Rye and Ron Johnson.
