= Wal Phillips =

British motorcycle speedway rider (1908–1998)

- Born: 17 October 1908; Tottenham, England
- Died: 5 January 1998 (aged 89); Cambridgeshire, England
- Nationality: British (English)

Career history
- 1929–1932: Stamford Bridge Pensioners
- 1933–1936: Wimbledon Dons

Team honours
- 1929: Southern League Champions
- 1932: National Association Trophy

Walter Hartley Phillips (17 October 1908 – 5 January 1998) was an international motorcycle speedway rider who rode in the first ever World Championship final in 1936. He earned 27 international caps for the England national speedway team.

== Career ==
Phillips began his speedway career alongside Gus Kuhn at Stamford Bridge Pensioners in 1929, winning the Southern League Championship, and stayed there until they closed at the end of the 1932 season, where he also appeared in the final of the Star Riders' Championship . Philips then joined the Wimbledon Dons, staying there until the end of the 1936 season.

Phillips represented England from 1930 until 1936. His career was ended on the 1936/37 tour of Australia when he suffered a broken leg at the Sydney Showground.

== World Final appearances ==
- 1936 – (England) London, Wembley Stadium – 13th – 5pts + 7 semi-final points

== Engineering ==
Phillips was a renowned engineer, his uncle was a development engineer and works rider at JA Prestwich Industries Ltd (JAP), and was instrumental in the development of the JAP engines used in speedway. Stan Greening was developing an engine specifically for speedway but the results were not impressive after testing by Australian riders Billy Lamont and Vic Huxley. Greening and Phillips stripped down Phillips' Rudge bike and used some of the ideas in that engine with the new one of their own. When Phillips rode the bike at a meeting at Stamford Bridge stadium, he beat the track record time. The JAP engines remained in use until the mid-1960s.

Phillips was also known for what he termed as his fuel injector, a carburettor replacement mainly intended for motorcycles and scooters.
