= Stamford Bridge Pensioners =

British motorcycle speedway team

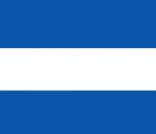

Club information
- Track address: Stamford Bridge Stadium; Fulham Road; London
- Country: England
- Founded: 1929
- Closed: 1932
- Team captain: Gus Kuhn
- League: Southern League (1929-1931); National League (1932)

Club facts
- Colours: Blue and white
- Track size: 345 yards (315 m)

Major team honours
Southern League Champions	1929
National Association Trophy	1932

The Stamford Bridge Pensioners were a speedway team which operated from 1929 until their closure in 1932.

== History ==
In 1928 the new sport known as dirt track arrived from Australia and a speedway track was constructed around the football pitch at the Stamford Bridge Stadium, home to Chelsea F.C. The first fixture was held on 5 May 1928.

The following year a team was created known as the Stamford Bridge Pensioners. The team were one of the pioneers of British speedway, entering and winning the inaugural Southern League championship in 1929. The track was made from black cinders and was also used as an athletics track, and after speedway finished it was used as a greyhound racing track.

The team became the first champions of the United Kingdom when they won the 1929 Speedway Southern League, alongside Leeds Lions who won the Northern League.

The league winning team included their captain Gus Kuhn, one of the early stars. Four seasons of league speedway were held with riders such as Frank Arthur, Arthur Warwick, Dick Smythe and Wal Phillips impressing.

The team disbanded after the 1932 Speedway National League season, when a greyhound racing track replaced it due to the profits being established by the totalisator takings at greyhound tracks.

== Notable riders ==
- (Australia) Frank Arthur
- (England) Gus Kuhn
- (England) Wal Phillips
- (Australia) Dick Smythe
- (England) Arthur Warwick

== Season summary ==
Year and league	Position	Notes
1929 Speedway Southern League	1st	Champions
1930 Speedway Southern League	3rd	
1931 Speedway Southern League	2nd	
1932 Speedway National League	4th	National Association Trophy winners
