= Nobby Key =

British speedway rider

- Born: 28 March 1906; Forest Gate, Essex, England
- Died: 20 April 1941 (aged 35); Sheringham Avenue, East London
- Nationality: British (English)

Career history
- 1929: Wembley Lions
- 1929: Cardiff White City
- 1930–1931: Nottingham
- 1931–1933: Crystal Palace Glaziers
- 1934–1937: New Cross Lambs
- 1937–1938: Wimbledon Dons

Team honours
- 1938: National Trophy Winner
- 1934, 1938: London Cup Winner

Walter Charles Key known as Nobby Key (28 March 1906 – 20 April 1941) was an international speedway rider from England. He earned 11 international caps for the England national speedway team.

== Speedway career ==
Key earned the nickname 'Nobby' and came to prominence in 1929 when signing for the Wembley Lions. During the 1931 season, when riding for Nottingham (speedway) he was seeking a transfer following continued machinery problems and as one of their star riders was also one of the highest wage earners, something the club were addressing. He did leave and joined the Crystal Palace Glaziers where he became their club captain and earned several England caps.

When the Crystal Palace operation moved in 1934, Key was attached to the New Cross Lambs and was part of the team that won the 1934 London Cup.

When riding for the Wimbledon Dons from 1937 to 1938, Key won another London Cup and won the 1938 National Trophy.

== War and death ==
Key joined the Merchant navy at the outbreak of World War II. However, he is listed as being killed as a civilian casualty on 20 April 1941 at Sheringham Avenue (presumably in a bombing) in Manor Park, London, based on the fact that he is listed as a civilian casualty and that it is known that Sheringham Avenue was subject to German bombs in late April 1941.

== Players cigarette cards ==
Key is listed as number 22 of 50 in the 1930s Player's cigarette card collection.
