= West Ham Hammers =

English motorcycle speedway club

- West Ham Speedway Badge circa 1938

Club information
- Track address: West Ham Stadium; Prince Regent Lane; London
- Country: England
- Founded: 1929
- Closed: 1972

Club facts
- Colours: Claret and blue with white crossed hammers
- Track size: 440 yards (400 m) (1929-1964); 415 yards (379 m) (1964-1971)
- Track record time: 0:17.6 (one lap), 1:10.2 (four laps)
- Track record date: 1967 (one lap), Easter Monday 1969 (four laps)
- Track record holder: Ken McKinlay / Sverre Harrfeldt (one lap), Ray Wilson (four laps)

Major team honours
UK champions	1937, 1965
Knockout Cup winners	1965
ACU Cup Winners	1938
London Cup Winners	1965, 1966, 1967
Coronation Gold Cup Best Pairs	1937

The West Ham Hammers were a speedway team that raced at West Ham Stadium in London, England, from 1929 to 1971. The team were twice champions of the United Kingdom.

== History ==
=== Origins and 1920s ===
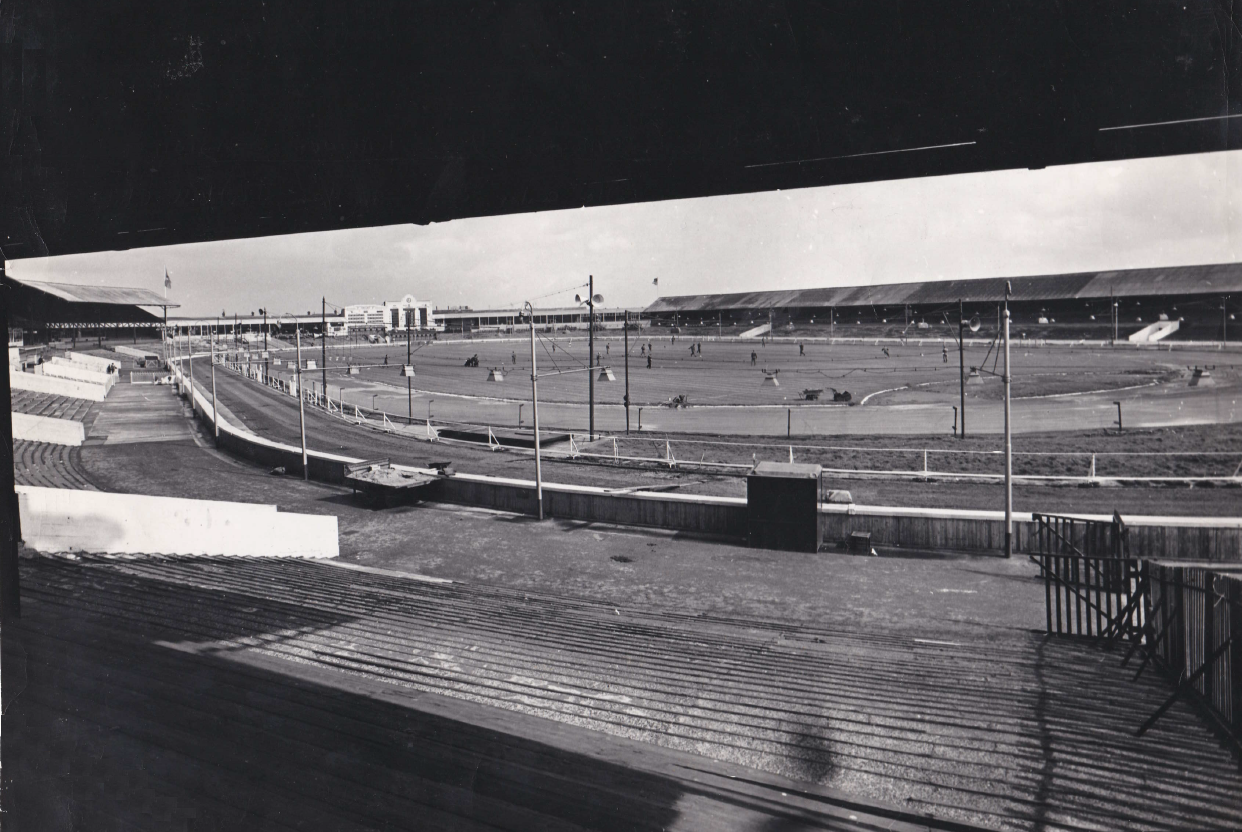
West Ham or Custom House Stadium

Speedway arrived at West Ham in 1928, the inaugural year of the new dirt-track racing sport that had arrived from Australia. The first event was held at the West Ham Stadium (known as Custom House Stadium in speedway circles) on 28 July 1928, with an individual meeting won by Sprouts Elder. Over 30 fixtures followed that year.

West Ham were founder members of the 1929 Speedway Southern League, one of two leagues that came into existence that year (the other being the 1929 Speedway English Dirt Track League or Northern league). The team promoted by Jimmy Baxter finished 6th behind Stamford Bridge in the league standings.

=== 1930s ===
West Ham finished 9th and 3rd respectively in 1930 and 1931 before being founder members of the new National league (a merger of the Southern and Northern leagues). Some of the early stars for West Ham included Australian Bluey Wilkinson, Tommy Croombs and Tiger Stevenson; Croombs topped the league averages in 1931.

The Hammers equalled their best place finish of 3rd in both 1933 and 1935 and going into the 1937 Speedway National League the team were still searching for the elusive silverware and had finished in last place in 1936. Wilkinson, Croombs and Stevenson remained important riders and with strong support from Eric Chitty, Arthur Atkinson, Charlie Spinks and Broncho Dixon the Hammers went from being last in 1936 to becoming league champions.

The following season the team finished runner-up to New Cross Rangers and won the ACU Cup. The 1939 season was halted by the outbreak of World War II.

=== 1940s ===
Meetings were staged in 1945 but the Hammers returned for the 1946 Speedway National League (first post-war league season) and with a significantly different team performed terribly, losing 23 of their 30 league and ACU matches. The Hammers slowly improved towards the end of the decade under the leadership of their Australian rider Aub Lawson.

=== 1950s ===
West Ham remained in the top division of British speedway for six seasons from 1950 until 1955, with a best place finish of 4th in both 1951 and 1952. Aub Lawson was replaced at number 1 in 1951 by the world champion Jack Young. The Australian retained his world title in 1952 and was sensational for West Ham during the period but lacked back up in team.

Shortly before the start of the 1955 season the West Ham promoter Alan Sanderson informed the Speedway Control Board that West Ham were withdrawing from the league. Sanderson had failed to negotiate terms with the stadium owners and had lost Jack Young who was staying in Australia.

=== 1960s ===
The Hammers did not re-open until 1964 under a promotion fronted by former rider Tommy Price. A leading Swedish rider Björn Knutson was brought in but the Hammers finished last of seven teams.

Changes were made for the inaugural season of the British League in 1965, Knutson left but Scot Ken McKinlay and Norwegian Sverre Harrfeldt came in and English riders Norman Hunter and Malcolm Simmons both improved their averages, which ultimately led to West Ham winning the league title. Just like in 1937 the Hammers had gone from finishing last the season before winning the title.

Dave Lanning became promoter in 1966, and West Ham ran for a further six seasons, a time that saw the number of teams in the league increase and West Ham win three consecutive London Cups in 1966, 1967 and 1968.

=== 1970s ===
A tough start to the decade saw the Hammers finish 18 out of 19 in 1970, despite the efforts of Swedish duo Olle Nygren and Christer Löfqvist. Then in 1971 West Ham were informed that the stadium was being sold by the Greyhound Racing Association to make way for building development.

The Romford Bombers moved into the stadium for the 1972 season, racing under the name West Ham Bombers. but as the original West Ham team folded in the speedway British League Division One, at the end of the 1971 season, the prospect of racing at the famous Custom House Stadium, albeit with a "nomad" team, delighted the local populace, and attendances at Custom House for the Bombers were very healthy. However, uncertainty dogged the promotion, with always the prospect of the stadium being sold from underneath them at short notice, and after just 6 home meetings (with the Bombers maintaining a healthy league position), the plug was pulled and the last speedway meeting at West Ham Stadium was held on 23 May 1972, with West Ham against Hull. The West Ham Bombers lost the match 38-40, with the last league race (heat 13) won by Hull's Tony Childs. West Ham's Kevin Holden was the winner of the last race, the second-half finale, to finally complete a long and sad disintegration of the sport at one of the world's most famous venues.

The stadium was demolished later that year and the site redeveloped for housing. The roads on the new estate were all named after former West Ham riders, mostly from the 1930s, 1940s and 1950s.

== Notable riders ==
- (England) Arthur Atkinson*
- (Canada) Eric Chitty*
- (England) Malcolm Craven*
- (England) Tommy Croombs*
- (England) Broncho Dixon
- (Canada) Jimmie Gibb*
- (England) Wally Green*
- (Norway) Sverre Harrfeldt*
- (England) Bob Harrison*
- (England) Norman Hunter*
- (England) Gerry Hussey*
- (Sweden) Björn Knutson*
- (Australia) Aub Lawson*
- (Sweden) Christer Löfqvist*
- (Scotland) Ken McKinlay*
- (Sweden) Olle Nygren
- (England) Malcolm Simmons
- (England) Charlie Spinks*
- (England) Tiger Stevenson*
- (England) Colin Watson*
- (Australia) Bluey Wilkinson*
- (Australia) Jack Young*

* Denotes the top twenty West Ham riders as voted in Speedway '72 magazine published in 1972

== Season summary ==
Extended content

Year and league	Position	Notes
1929 Speedway Southern League	6th	
1930 Speedway Southern League	9th	
1931 Speedway Southern League	3rd	
1932 Speedway National League	6th	
1933 Speedway National League	3rd	
1934 Speedway National League	4th	
1935 Speedway National League	3rd	
1936 Speedway National League	7th	
1937 Speedway National League	1st	champions
1938 Speedway National League	2nd	A.C.U Cup winners
1938 Speedway National League Division Two	4th	reserve team, West Ham Hawks
1939 Speedway National League	4th+	
1946 Speedway National League	6th	
1947 Speedway National League	6th	
1948 Speedway National League	3rd	
1949 Speedway National League	4th	
1950 Speedway National League	5th	
1951 Speedway National League	4th	
1952 Speedway National League	4th	
1953 Speedway National League	6th	
1954 Speedway National League	5th	
1955 Speedway National League	7th	
1964 Speedway National League	7th	
1965 British League season	1st	champions & Knockout Cup winners
1966 British League season	7th	
1967 British League season	3rd	
1968 British League season	6th	
1969 British League season	18th	
1970 British League season	18th	
1971 British League season	19th	

+4th when league suspended
