= Gus Kuhn =

British speedway rider (1898–1966)

- Born: 17 October 1898; Birmingham, England
- Died: 30 August 1966 (aged 67)
- Nationality: British (English)

Career history
- 1929–1932: Stamford Bridge Pensioners
- 1933–1937: Wimbledon Dons
- 1937: Wembley Lions
- 1938: Lea Bridge
- 1939: Southampton Saints

Team honours
- 1929: Southern League Champion
- 1932: National Association Trophy Winner

Gus Kuhn
Motorcycle racing career statistics
Isle of Man TT career
| TTs contested | 5 (1920, 1922, 1924–1926) |
| TT wins | 0 |
| TT podiums | 0 |

Gustave Emil Kuhn (17 October 1898 – 30 August 1966) was a successful British TT and motorcycle speedway rider during the 1920s and 1930s. He earned four international caps for the England national speedway team and served in the Royal Naval Air Service in World War I.

== Speedway career ==
Kuhn, born in Birmingham, captained the Stamford Bridge team to victory in the 1929 Southern League Championship, and after Stamford Bridge closed in 1932, he spent nearly five years racing for the Wimbledon Dons.

In 1937, Kuhn moved to the Wembley Lions and then Lea Bridge Speedway Team in 1938, where he was captain. He retired from speedway in 1939 after a season with the Southampton Saints.

"A wily master of track-craft, a brilliant mechanic, a darned hard man to get past (and not only because of his portly figure), and above all a thorough sportsman and a jolly good fellow". - Speedway News 16 May 1936

Kuhn made his first appearance for England during the first international test match against Australia (1930) and went on to make four international appearances throughout the decade.

== Film appearance ==
The speedway scenes from the 1933 film Britannia of Billingsgate were shot at Hackney Wick Stadium and featured some of the leading riders in Britain at the time including Kuhn, Colin Watson, Arthur Warwick, Tom Farndon, Claude Rye and Ron Johnson.

== Isle of Man TT ==
As a rider in the TT, Kuhn's greatest success came in the 1926 Isle of Man TT in the Junior TT division.
Results summary

| Position | 5 | 7 | 12 | DNF |
| No of times | 1 | 1 | 1 | 4 |

== Off track ==
In 1932, Kuhn founded Gus Kuhn Motors in Clapham Road, London. The company dealt in Triumphs, BSA and Nortons, its reputation for racing success was not to come until a few years later. After Kuhn's death in 1966, the Gus Kuhn name lived on, the firm now being run by his son-in-law, Vincent Davey. The team focused primarily on racing modifications to Norton Motorcycles and by 1969 they had won the British 500cc Championship, Castrol Championship, Duckhams Trophy, Grovewood Award and Redex Trophy. For a number of years, Norton racing kits and parts were produced for practically every part of the Norton. Over the years these racing machines supplied a number of notable riders including Mick Andrew, Charlie Sanby and Dave Potter.

== Players cigarette cards ==
Kuhn is listed as number 25 of 50 in the 1930s Player's cigarette card collection.
