= Frank Arthur =

Australian speedway rider

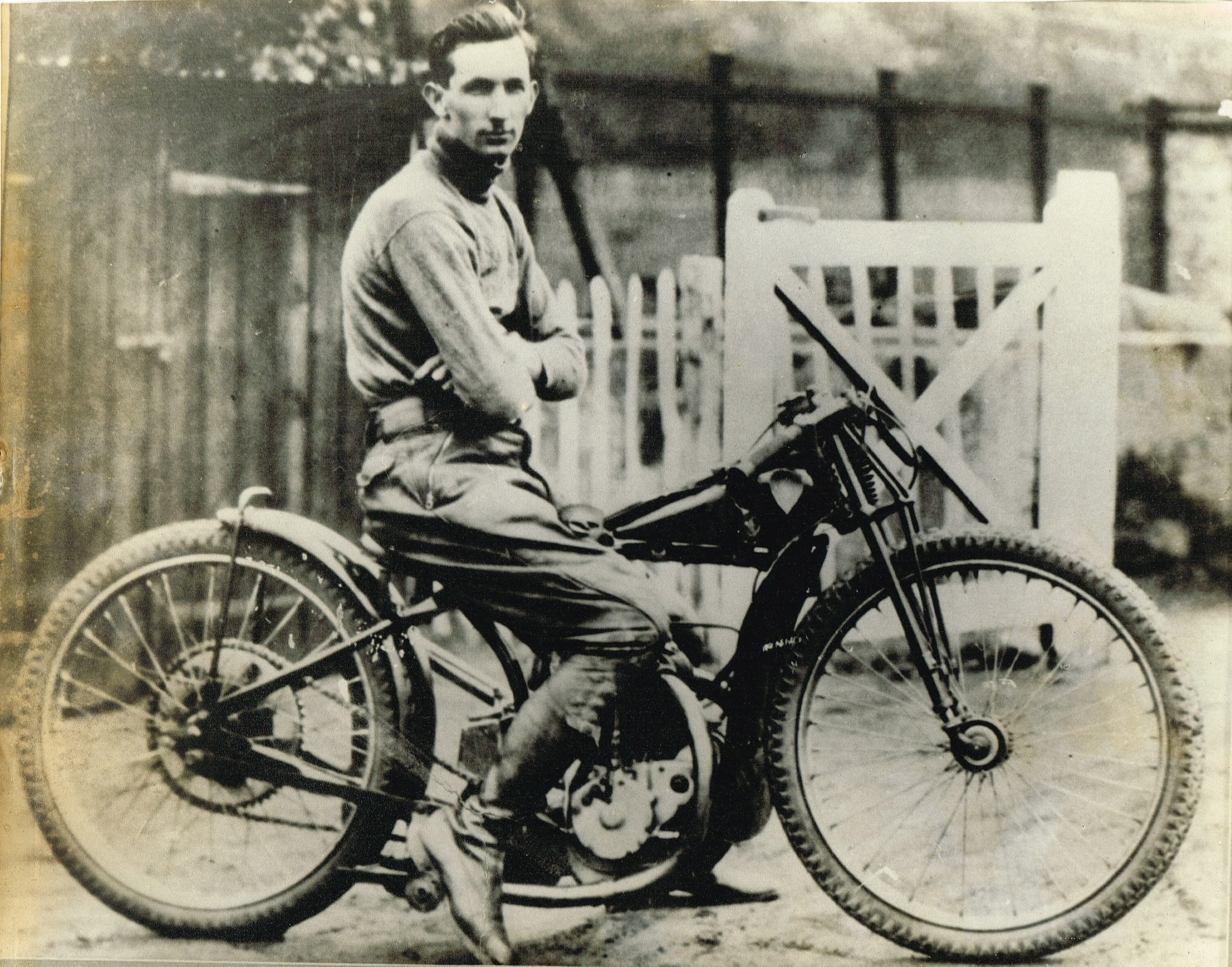
- Born: 12 December 1908; Lismore, New South Wales
- Died: 11 September 1972 (aged 63); Sydney, New South Wales
- Nationality: Australian

Career history
- 1930–1932: Stamford Bridge Pensioners
- 1934–1935: Harringay Tigers

Individual honours
- 1929: Overseas Star Riders' Champion

Team honours
- 1932: National Association Trophy

Harold Frank Milton Arthur (12 December 1908 in Lismore, New South Wales – 11 September 1972 in Sydney) was a former international motorcycle speedway rider who won the first Star Riders' Championship, the forerunner of the Speedway World Championship, in 1929. He earned 15 international caps for the Australia national speedway team.

== Career ==
Arthur born in Lismore, New South Wales started work as a farm hand before taking up speedway. He first had success in Australia, winning the Golden Helmet there in 1927. He was one of the pioneers of speedway in the UK. He brought Max Grosskreutz over from Australia in 1929 and supplied Dicky Case and Ray Tauser with machines and support for fifty percent of their earnings. Arthur was considered to have the fastest bikes in British speedway in those early years.

Arthur rode for the Stamford Bridge Pensioners from 1930 until their closure in 1932. He returned to the UK in 1934 to ride again for the Harringay Tigers. He also represented Australia in test matches against England from 1930 to 1934.

Arthur promoted speedway in the United States, and he was also involved in the business side of the sport in Australia, where he helped Max Grosskreutz to start his career. He promoted at Sydney Royale before losing the lease in 1938. He solved this problem by building the speedway track at the Sydney Sports Ground next door. He also ran midget car circuits in Australia.

Arthur died of a heart attack in Sydney on 11 September 1972.

In 2007, Arthur was one of the inaugural ten inductees into the Australian Speedway Hall of Fame.
