= Joe Francis (speedway rider) =

British motorcycle speedway rider

- Born: 7 February 1907; Foots Cray, Kent, England
- Died: July 1985 (aged 78); Reading, Berkshire
- Nationality: British (English)

Career history
- 1929–1933: Crystal Palace Glaziers
- 1934–1939: New Cross Lambs/Rangers
- 1938: Lea Bridge Cubs

Individual honours
- 1931: London Riders' Championship

Team honours
- 1938: League champions
- 1931, 1934, 1937: London Cup

Joseph Thomas Francis (7 February 1907 – July 1985) was an international motorcycle speedway rider from England. He earned six international caps for the England national speedway team.

== Biography ==
Francis born in Kent during 1907, was a rider in the early pioneer days of speedway in Great Britain and raced in 1928, before crowds in excess of 20,000 and a year before the leagues were even introduced. He began league racing for the Crystal Palace Glaziers during the inaugural 1929 Speedway Southern League.

Francis spent five seasons with Crystal Palace, becoming a regular rider at the club and helped them win the 1931 London Cup. In 1931, he also won the prestigious London Riders' Championship at his home track.

In 1934, the Crystal Palace promotion and team relocated to New Cross and became the New Cross Lambs. Francis stayed with the team during the move and won a second London Cup. He would stay with New Cross (now called the Rangers) for another six years until the end of his career and won the 1938 Speedway National League title with New Cross.

Francis was effectively a one club man with the exception of a few rides for Lea Bridge Cubs in 1938. By trade he was a motorcycle dealer based at Eltham.
