= Wembley Lions (speedway) =

Former British speedway team

Club information
- Track address: Empire Stadium; Wembley; London
- Country: England
- Founded: 1929
- Closed: 1971

Club facts
- Colours: Red and White
- Track size: 378 yards (345m)

Major team honours
UK champions	1932, 1946, 1947, 1949, 1950, 1951, 1952, 1953
National Trophy winners	1931, 1932, 1939, 1948, 1954
British Speedway Cup Winners	1947
Southern League champions	1930, 1931
London Cup	1930, 1932, 1933, 1946, 1948, 1949, 1950, 1951

The Wembley Lions were a motorcycle speedway team which operated from 1929 until their closure in 1971. Their track was located at the old Wembley Stadium or Empire Stadium, Wembley Park, London, England. The team were eight times champions of the United Kingdom.

== History ==
=== Origins and 1920s ===
Speedway arrived at Wembley in 1929, the year after the new dirt-track racing sport that had arrived from Australia. The first speedway event held at Wembley Stadium (known as the Empire Stadium at the time) was on 16 May 1929, with an individual meeting won by Roger Frogley.

A team called the Lions was created and they were founder members of the 1929 Speedway Southern League, one of two leagues that came into existence that year (the other being the 1929 Speedway English Dirt Track League or Northern league). The team finished 5th behind Stamford Bridge in the league standings.

=== 1930s ===
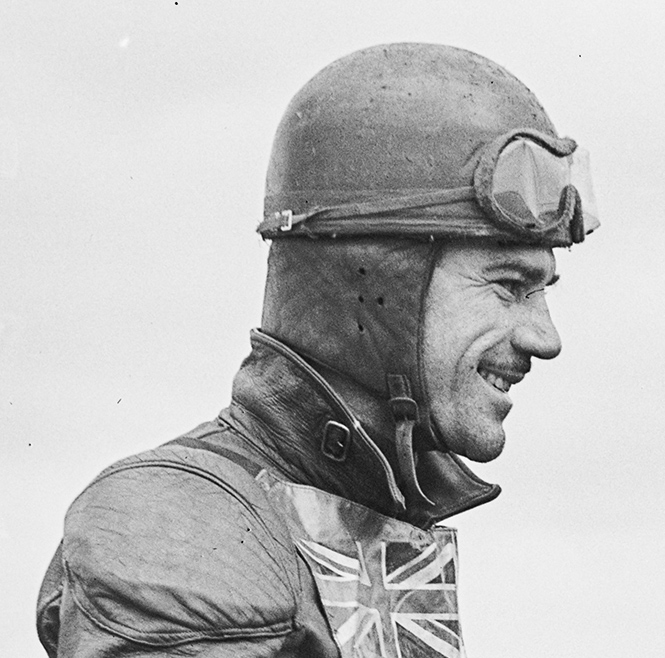
Wembley's Lionel Van Praag

The Lions soon became one of the leading teams in the United Kingdom, winning the Southern League in 1930 and 1931, the inaugural London Cup in 1930 and the inaugural National Trophy in 1931. Riders' Jack Ormston and Colin Watson both recorded averages over ten.

In 1932 Wembley were founder members of the new National league (a merger of the Southern and Northern leagues) and remained the team to beat as they secured the first National League title, in addition to winning the National Trophy and London Cup. Despite riders Ormston and Watson underperforming there were several other riders that stepped up including Ginger Lees and New Zealander Wally Kilmister.

Several quiet seasons dominated by Belle Vue Aces ensued before the Lions rider Lionel Van Praag from Australia became the first winner of the World Speedway Championship in 1936. The event would become the blue riband of the sport and Wembley Stadium would become the home of the final every year.

The 1939 season was halted by the outbreak of World War II but not before Wembley were declared joint winners of the National Trophy with Belle Vue. Both teams had progressed to the final which had been due to take place on 16 September.

=== 1940s ===
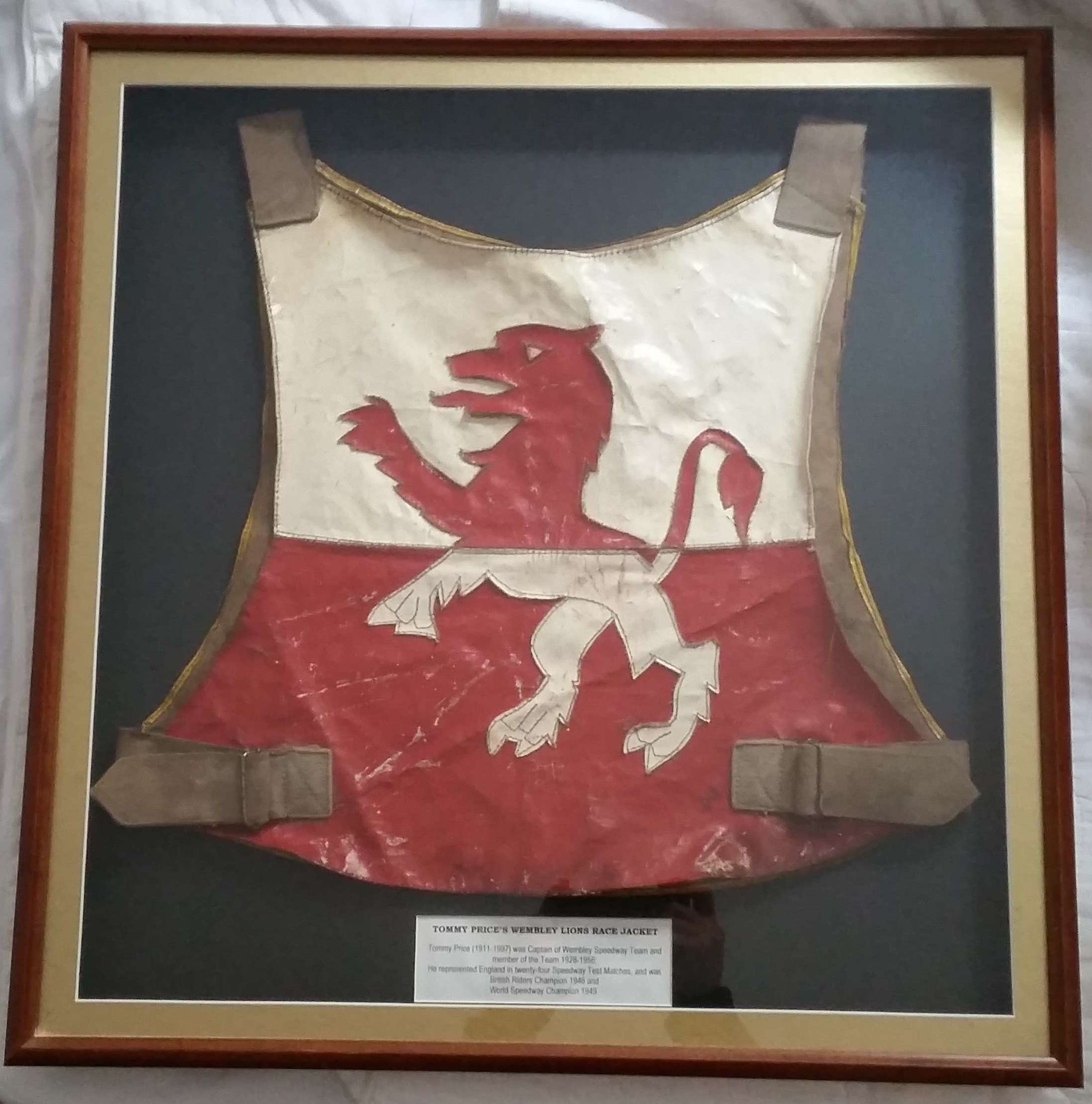
Tommy Price's Wembley Lions race jacket

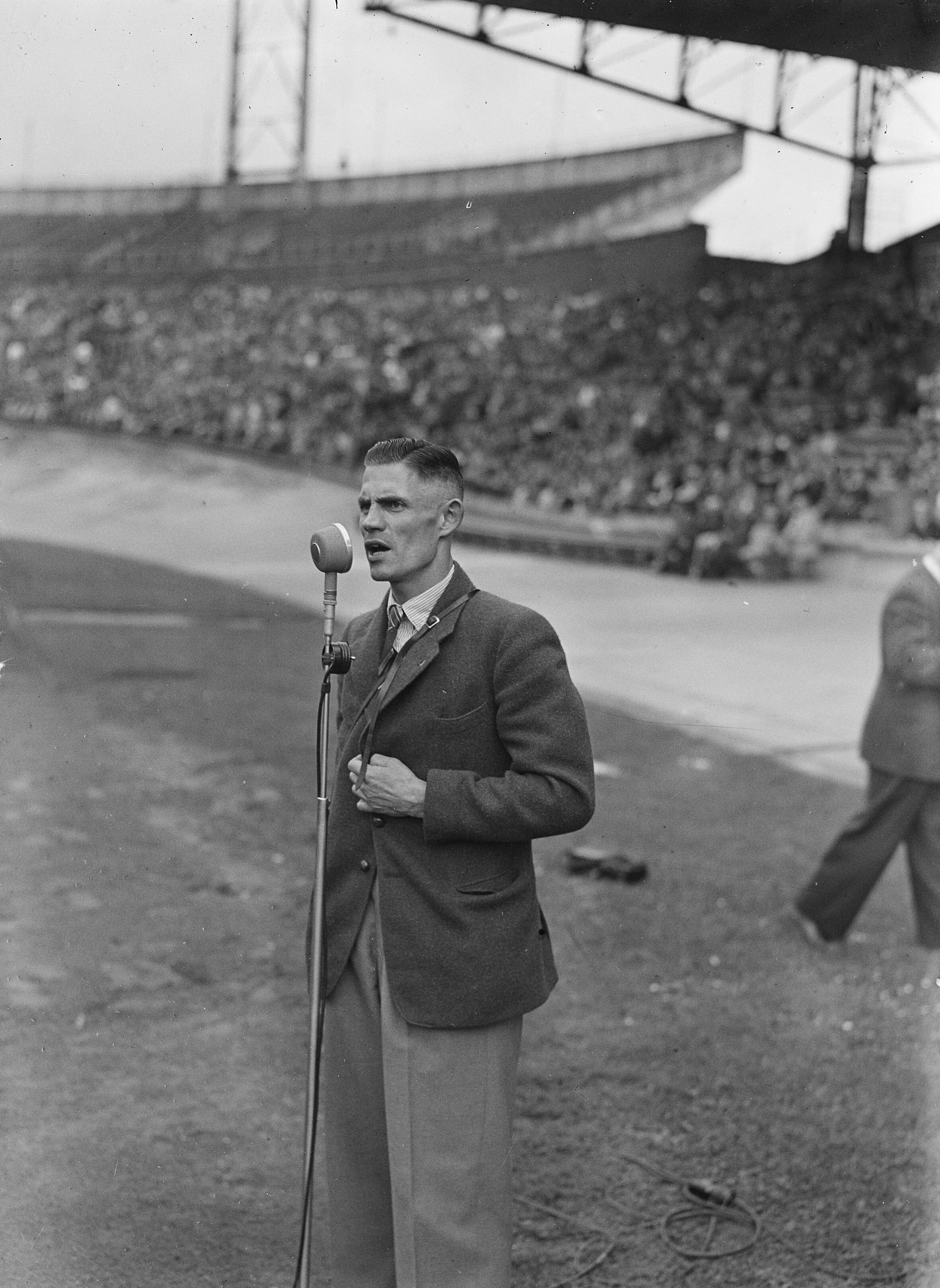
Tommy Price in 1950

Individual meetings were staged in 1945 but the Lions returned for the 1946 Speedway National League (first post-war league season) with a new team that included Bill Kitchen, Tommy Price and George Wilks. The Lions dominated the season, winning their second UK title and fourth London Cup. The following season they retained their title with relative ease.

National Trophy and London Cup triumphs in 1948 were followed by the Lions ending the decade by winning a fourth UK league title in 1949. Rider's Freddie Williams, Split Waterman and Bill Gilbert were instrumental in the continued success. Many of the Wembley "home" meetings in 1948 were staged at Wimbledon as the Empire Stadium was used for the 1948 Summer Olympics.

=== 1950s ===
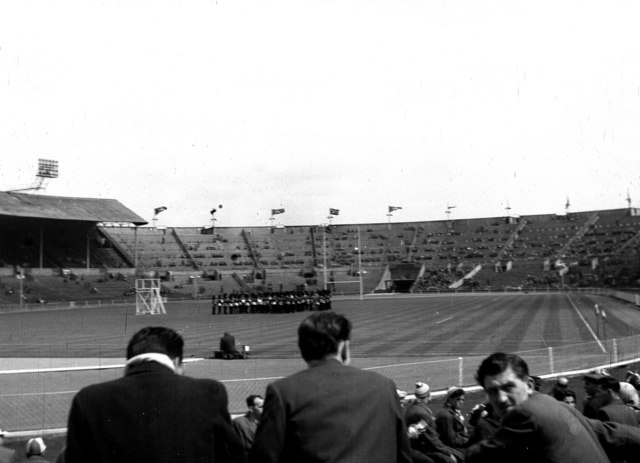
Wembley Stadium in 1956

The 1950s brought an unprecedented period of success for the Wembley Lions starting with a successful defence of their league crown in 1950, which was then followed by three more league titles. The five consecutive wins from 1949 to 1953 had eclipsed Belle Vue's four from 1933 to 1936. The Lions riders Tommy Price (1949 world champion) and the Welsh brothers Freddie Williams (twice world champion in 1950 and 1953) and Eric Williams were particularly dominant during this period.

The Lions performed well from 1954 to 1956, finishing 2nd, 3rd and 2nd respectively, with Brian Crutcher taking over the number one rider role. However, at the end of the 1956 season the Lions withdrew from the league before the 1957 season started due to the death of Sir Arthur Elvin, the chairman of Wembley Stadium.

During this era, speedway went through the biggest crowd "boom" in its history. Wembley, who ran league meetings every Thursday, had by far the biggest crowds. The average weekly attendances were around the 60,000 mark from 1946–1951, with one meeting of note, a London Cup match between Wembley and West Ham, drawing an estimated crowd of 85,000 with 20,000 locked outside, listening to a BBC radio commentary of the match via loudspeakers set up in the car park. Towards the mid-1950s speedway crowds fell away dramatically and Wembley's last season in 1956 saw average attendances of around the 15,000 mark.

=== 1970s ===
In 1970, Wembley speedway returned, with the Lions entering the British League. Promoters Trevor Redmond and Bernard Cottrell bought their licence and the contracts of some of the riders from the Edinburgh Monarchs promoter Ian Hoskins who was operating at Coatbridge. The Lions only managed to stay in operation for two seasons due to the stadium not being able to support speedway at all times due to commitments to other events being held there.

== Big events ==
Wembley Stadium staged the Speedway World Championship Final continuously from 1936 to 1938 and then when it was re-introduced after World War II from 1949 to 1960. It went on to stage the championship a further nine times before the last contest at Wembley in 1981.

== Notable riders ==
- (England) Frank Charles
- (England) Brian Crutcher
- (Sweden) Ove Fundin
- (England) Bill Gilbert
- (England) George Greenwood
- (Scotland) Bert Harkins
- (England) Dave Jessup
- (England) Nobby Key
- (New Zealand) Wally Kilmister
- (England) Bill Kitchen
- (England) Ginger Lees
- (England) Bob Oakley
- (England) Jack Ormston
- (England) Tommy Price
- (Australia) Lionel Van Praag
- (United States) Ray Tauscher
- (England) Split Waterman
- (England) Colin Watson
- (England) George Wilks
- (Wales) Freddie Williams
- (Wales) Eric Williams

== Season summary ==
Extended content

Year and league	Position	Notes
1929 Speedway Southern League	5th	
1930 Speedway Southern League	1st	champions
1931 Speedway Southern League	1st	champions and National Trophy winner
1932 Speedway National League	1st	champions and National Trophy winner
1933 Speedway National League	6th	
1934 Speedway National League	2nd	
1935 Speedway National League	4th	
1936 Speedway National League	2nd	
1937 Speedway National League	2nd	
1938 Speedway National League	3rd	
1939 Speedway National League	3rd+	National Trophy winner+
1946 Speedway National League	1st	champions
1947 Speedway National League	1st	champions & British Speedway Cup winner
1948 Speedway National League	4th	National Trophy winner
1949 Speedway National League	1st	champions
1950 Speedway National League	1st	champions
1951 Speedway National League	1st	champions
1952 Speedway National League	1st	champions
1953 Speedway National League	1st	champions
1954 Speedway National League	2nd	National Trophy winner
1955 Speedway National League	3rd	
1956 Speedway National League	2nd	
1970 British League season	14th	
1971 British League season	9th	

+3rd when season suspended and jointly declared National Trophy winner with Belle Vue
