= Ron Johnson (speedway rider) =

Australian speedway rider (1907–1983)

- Born: 24 February 1907; Duntocher, Scotland
- Died: 4 February 1983 (aged 75)
- Nationality: British (Scottish) and Australian

Career history
- 1930–1933: Crystal Palace Glaziers
- 1934–1951: New Cross Lambs/Rangers
- 1951–1952: Ashfield Giants
- 1955: West Ham Hammers
- 1960: Edinburgh Monarchs

Individual honours
- 1945, 1946: London Riders' Championship
- 1945: Scottish Champion
- 1956: WA State Champion (Aust)

Team honours
- 1938, 1948: National League Champion
- 1931, 1934, 1937, 1947: London Cup

Ron Johnson (born Ronald Johnston; 24 February 1907 – 4 February 1983) was a speedway rider who won the London Riders' Championship in 1945 (unattached) and in 1946 whilst with the New Cross Rangers.

== Career ==
Johnson emigrated to Australia with his parents when he was just a child. He started racing at the Claremont Speedway in Perth, Western Australia in 1927 (the same year the venue first held racing), before his travelling to the UK with promoter Johnnie Hoskins in 1928 to start a career with Crystal Palace. Johnson initially struggled on British tracks that were half the size of the ones he was used to (the Claremont Showground, which doubled as the speedway, was some 550 metres (600 yd) in length, while other Australian tracks of the day, usually showground tracks, ranged from 450 metres (490 yd) to 610 metres (670 yd) in length). In 1931, he won the British Match Race Championship, defeating Claude Rye, retaining the title against Syd Jackson before losing it to Tiger Stevenson. In 1933 he was runner up in the Star Riders' Championship, the forerunner of the Speedway World Championship.

In 1934, Johnson joined the New Cross Rangers, with whom he retained connections throughout his career. During his time with New Cross, he lived at The Dorchester with his wife Ruby and lived an opulent lifestyle.

Johnson qualified for the 1937 Speedway World Championship final as reserve, but did not ride. He also qualified for the 1939 Speedway World Championship final which was never held due to the outbreak of World War II.

== Film appearance ==
The speedway scenes from the 1933 film Britannia of Billingsgate were shot at Hackney Wick Stadium and featured some of the leading riders in Britain at the time including Johnson, Colin Watson, Arthur Warwick, Gus Kuhn, Tom Farndon and Claude Rye.

== Injuries ==
Johnson's career was beset with injuries. In 1935 he was involved in a crash which saw teammate Tom Farndon suffer fatal head injuries at New Cross. Johnson had multiple lacerations to his arm which kept him from competing in the Star Riders' Championship final.

Up until 1949, Johnson had lost a toe (after a crash at Exeter in 1929) and the tops of two of his fingers (after catching them in his chain in 1931) as results of track injuries. However, on 1 August 1949, he had a huge crash at Wimbledon. He was following his teammate Cyril Roger for a 5-1 heat win. Roger wobbled in front of him and Johnson fell. As he got back onto his feet he was hit by Wimbledon rider Cyril Brine and knocked down, suffering a fractured skull. He also suffered a near fatal blood clot. This clot may have been jolted loose, thus saving his life, by one stretcher bearer who was walking out of step with the others when Johnson was removed from the track. Doctors wanted Johnson to stay in hospital for six months but he discharged himself after a month.

== Comebacks ==
Johnson attempted a comeback in 1950 but was nothing like the rider he was before the near-fatal accident. His form did not improve in 1951 so dropped down a division to ride for the Glasgow Giants. His form failed to improve there so retired and returned to Australia.

After a couple of years, Johnson made a comeback the Claremont speedway in Perth, winning the West Australian Solo Championship title in the 1954–55 season. He wanted to return to New Cross but they had closed down, so he returned to the UK for an ill-fated spell with the West Ham Hammers but again failed to perform to anywhere near his pre-1949 levels. He returned home to Australia after friends in the UK helped him with his fare.

New Cross re-opened in 1959 and Johnson decided to make another comeback attempt, at the age of fifty-two. However, he was unable to keep up even with the juniors. He captained the New Cross Colts in a match against Edinburgh and scored three points with a race win which showed flashes of his old brilliance. He then tried his luck with the Edinburgh Monarchs but scored just one point (plus one bonus point)in six matches and eventually returned to Australia. There was further talk of him coming back in 1963 when New Cross entered the Provincial League and although he came back to Britain and settled near the track, the proposed comeback came to nothing, although he did take to the track once more on 14 May that year, defeating Phil Bishop 2–1 in a second half match race series.

== After retirement ==
1937 cigarette card

It has been said that in 1968, Johnson was involved in a road accident and suffered serious injuries to leave him using a wheelchair for the rest of his life. This however is not true as he had recovered sufficiently and lived modestly in Thornlie, Western Australia, where his granddaughter visited from time to time and shared his love of motor bikes. He was still active and tinkering with his much loved Bentley and his old BSA in 1981.

Johnson died in 1983 at the age of 75.

== World Final appearances ==
- 1939 - (England) London, Wembley Stadium - Event cancelled due to World War II

== Players cigarette cards ==
Johnson is listed as number 21 of 50 in the 1930s Player's cigarette card collection.
