= Tom Farndon =

British speedway rider (1910–1935)

- Born: 11 September 1910; Coventry, England
- Died: 30 August 1935 (aged 24); London, England
- Nationality: British (English)

Career history
- 1929-1930: Coventry
- 1931-1933: Crystal Palace Glaziers
- 1934-1935: New Cross Lambs

Individual honours
- 1933: Star Riders' Champion
- 1934, 1935: London Riders' Champion
- 1934, 1935: British Individual Match Race Champion

Team honours
- 1931, 1934: London Cup

Thomas Farndon (11 September 1910 – 30 August 1935), was a British speedway rider who won the Star Riders' Championship in 1933 whilst with the Crystal Palace Glaziers.

== Career ==
Born in Coventry, Farndon started his career at the Lythalls Lane track in Foleshill and later rode for the club based at Brandon Stadium, before a spell with the Crystal Palace Glaziers. He moved to New Cross Lambs with Palace promoter Fred Mockford in 1934.

Farndon was the British Individual Match Race Champion and was undefeated from 1934 until his death in 1935. At his time of death, he had earned 21 international caps for the England national speedway team.

== Film appearance ==
The speedway scenes from the 1933 film Britannia of Billingsgate were shot at Hackney Wick Stadium and featured some of the leading riders in Britain at the time including Farndon, Colin Watson, Arthur Warwick, Gus Kuhn, Claude Rye and Ron Johnson.

== Death ==
Farndon was killed after a crash on 28 August 1935 whilst racing at the New Cross Stadium in a second half scratch race final. He was involved in a collision with team-mate Ron Johnson, who clipped the safety fence and fell causing Farndon to crash into Johnson's bike. Farndon suffered a fractured skull and spine injury and was unconscious when he was transferred to the Miller General Hospital in Greenwich. He died two days later (on 30 August) in Miller General Hospital, Greenwich, without regaining consciousness.

Thousands lined the streets to see his funeral. An art deco memorial in the form of a motorbike racer, carved by local sculptor Richard Ormerod out of black granite stands at Tom's final resting place in St. Paul's Cemetery, Holbrook Lane, Coventry.

== Tom Farndon Memorial ==
Between 1935 and 1961, the Tom Farndon Memorial was held on 11 occasions at the New Cross Stadium. The running of the memorial was abandoned after 1961 on the closure of New Cross.

Year	Winner
1935	Eric Langton ( (England) )
1936	Jack Milne ( (United States) )
1937	Not Held
1938	Bluey Wilkinson ( (Australia) )
1939–1945	Not Held due to World War II
1946	Malcolm Craven ( (England) )
1947	Jeff Lloyd ( (England) )
1948	Howdy Byford ( (England) )
1949	Not Held
1950	Graham Warren ( (Australia) )
1951	Jack Young ( (Australia) )
1952–1958	Not Held
1959	Peter Craven ( (England) )
1960	Ronnie Moore ( (New Zealand) )
1961	Jack Young ( (Australia) )

== See also ==
Rider deaths in motorcycle speedway
