= Syd Jackson (speedway rider) =

British motorcycle speedway rider

- Born: 3 July 1908; Coventry, England
- Died: 18 January 1988 (aged 79); Winchester, Hampshire
- Nationality: British (English)

Career history
- 1929–1931: Leicester Stadium
- 1931–1932: Coventry Bees
- 1933–1937: Wimbledon Dons

Sydney Packwood Jackson (sometimes referred to as Sid Jackson) (3 July 1908 – 18 January 1988) was a British motorcycle speedway rider, who was one of the stars of the early years of the sport in Britain, and an international rider who represented the England national speedway team eight times.

== Career ==
Prior to taking up speedway, Jackson rode in TT racing. He rode in the first year of British speedway in 1928, including the majority of the meetings held at Leicester Stadium, and between 1929 and 1931 captained the Leicester Stadium team. In 1929, he won fourteen individual titles. He won the Leicestershire Championship in both 1929 and 1930. He missed the start of the 1931 season, while he concentrated on obtaining a pilot's licence. When speedway closed down in Leicester in 1931 he moved on to Coventry Bees, where he became the club captain.

In 1933, Jackson joined Wimbledon Dons, where he spent five years. He became an accomplished pilot, flying his Avro Avian from Croydon to Australia in 1934. He broke his collar bone in a crash during June 1935.

Jackson reached the final of the Star Riders' Championship in five consecutive years between 1930 and 1934.

Jackson was included in the England team in four Test series against Australia between 1930 and 1933. In the first test of 1933 at Wembley, he scored 15 points from reserve, including three race wins in England's 76-47 victory. He scored 12 points in the second test at Belle Vue.
