= Southern League (1929–1931) =

British speedway league

- Sport: Speedway
- Founded: 1929
- Folded: 1931
- Replaced by: the National League
- Competitors: Varied
- Country: United Kingdom

The Southern League was founded in 1929 as the inaugural season of speedway racing in the United Kingdom for Southern British teams. The league ran for 3 seasons before being amalgamated with the Northern League to form the National League. The first winners were Stamford Bridge Pensioners but it was Wembley Lions who won the most titles.

== Champions ==
Season	Champions	Second
1929	Stamford Bridge Pensioners	Southampton Saints
1930	Wembley Lions	Southampton Saints
1931	Wembley Lions	Stamford Bridge Pensioners

== See also ==
List of United Kingdom Speedway League Champions
