= 1938 Speedway National League Division Two =

British motorcycle speedway rider

- League: National League Division Two
- No. of competitors: 9
- Champions: Hackney Wick Wolves
- Provincial Trophy: Norwich Stars
- English Speedway Trophy: Belle Vue Reserves
- National Trophy (Div 2 final): Norwich Stars
- Highest average: Max Grosskreutz
- Division/s above: 1938 National League (Division One)

The 1938 National League Division Two was the inaugural season of British speedway's National League Division Two albeit a continuation of the Provincial League from the previous season in all but name.

The list of teams had several changes. Bristol Bulldogs had moved up to the National League and Hackney Wick Wolves had moved down to take their place. They also swapped licences and riders as well as divisions. Other new entrants were Newcastle, Sheffield and West Ham Hawks (West Ham's reserve team) and Lea Bridge Cubs (made up largely of Harringay reserve riders).

Belle Vue Merseysiders who had replaced Liverpool in the previous season were also absent.

Nottingham withdrew just after the start of the league fixtures and were replaced by Leeds Lions. They did complete most of their early season cup fixtures.

Hackney Wick Wolves won the title.

== Final Table Division Two ==
Pos	Team	PL	W	D	L	Pts
1	Hackney Wick Wolves	16	12	0	4	24
2	Norwich Stars	16	12	0	4	24
3	Southampton Saints	16	9	0	7	18
4	West Ham Hawks	16	8	2	6	18
5	Lea Bridge Cubs	16	8	0	8	16
6	Newcastle Diamonds	16	7	1	8	15
7	Sheffield	16	6	1	9	13
8	Birmingham Bulldogs	16	6	0	10	12
9	Leeds Lions	16	2	0	14	4

== Fixtures & results ==
Home \ Away	BIR	HAC	LB	LEE	NEW	NOR	SHE	SOT	WH
Birmingham		37–46	32–52	49–33	60–24	34–47	54–30	50–34	52–30
Hackney	57–27		51–33	59–24	58–26	48–35	59–25	47–37	54–29
Lea Bridge	59–24	37–46		50–33	45–39	50–30	59–25	51–31	55–29
Leeds	0–70	27–54	46–36		39–44	29–52	40–44	47–36	38–46
Newcastle	57–27	27–57	51–32	50–34		41–43	52–29	45–39	42–40
Norwich	63–21	55–26	54–30	49–34	54–30		63–21	56–26	41–36
Sheffield	47–35	44–40	49–34	48–35	52–31	32–50		38–44	42–42
Southampton	52–29	58–26	51–33	54–29	63–21	58–24	58–26		55–26
West Ham	48–32	53–31	55–29	60–23	41–41	44–33	70–0	42–40	

Legend: Blue = home team win; Yellow = draw; Red = away team win.

== Leading averages (league only) ==
Rider	Team	Average
Max Grosskreutz	Norwich	10.89
George Greenwood	Leeds	10.77
Frank Goulden	Southampton	10.19
Charlie Spinks	West Ham	10.11
Frank Hodgson	Hackney	10.06

== Provincial Trophy ==
The 1938 Provincial Trophy was the third edition of the Trophy, which was won by Norwich Stars.

First round

Team one	Team two	scores
Norwich	Hackney	75–33, 44–62 (119–95 agg)
Birmingham	Leeds	61–46, 58–48 (119–94 agg)
Sheffield	Newcastle	68–38, 47–60 (115–98 agg)
Southampton	West Ham Hawks	82–26, 43–63 (125–89 agg)

Semifinals

Team one	Team two	scores
Norwich	Birmingham	72–34, 59–47 (131–81 agg)
Sheffield	Southampton	58–49, 53–53 (111–102 agg)

Final

Team one	Team two	scores
Norwich	Sheffield	74–32, 53–54 (127–86 agg)

== English Speedway Trophy ==
The early season competition was the called the English Speedway Trophy, which involved teams from division2 and the reserve teams of some of the division 1 clubs. The reserve teams were required to ride away fixtures only against the division 2 teams.

Group 1

Home \ Away	BIR	HAC	NCR	NOR	SOT	WEM
Birmingham		48–35	52–29	57–25	39–45	32–52
Hackney	55–29		45–36	60–22	38–43	54–30
New Cross Reserves	22–61	35–49		38–46	33–47	52–30
Norwich	45–39	55–28	47–36		46–36	40–44
Southampton	57–27	64–20	58–23	61–23		53–29
Wembley Reserves	32–46	24–58	49–34	36–48	33–48	

Legend: Blue = home team win; Yellow = draw; Red = away team win.

Group 2

Home \ Away	BV	NEW	NOT	SHE	WH
Belle Vue Reserves		59–24	48–34	42–41	33–51
Newcastle	36–45		41–43	49–30	57–26
Nottingham	32–47	55–27		35–47	53–31
Sheffield	35–41	55–29	46–35		45–38
West Ham Reserves	30–54	35–47	–	27–55	

Legend: Blue = home team win; Yellow = draw; Red = away team win.

Final

Team one	Team two	scores
Belle Vue Reserves	Southampton	47–36, 38–46 (85–82 agg)

== National Trophy ==
The 1938 National Trophy was the eighth edition of the Knockout Cup. Norwich Stars won the Division 2 Final round and therefore qualified for the quarter finals proper (the round when the tier one sides entered the competition).

=== First qualifying round ===
Date	Team one	Score	Team two
17/05	Nottingham+	60-48	Hackney Wick+
21/05	Hackney Wick+	59-49	Nottingham+
18/05	Birmingham	77-26	Sheffield
19/05	Sheffield	51-56	Birmingham
23/05	Newcastle	53-55	Norwich
28/05	Norwich	75-33	Newcastle
04/06	Hackney Wick	72-36	Leeds
06/06	Leeds	36-72	Hackney Wick

+ Nottingham withdrew from league replaced by Leeds resulting in Hackney's result becoming void.

=== Second qualifying round ===
Date	Team one	Score	Team two
15/06	Birmingham	57.5-49.5	Hackney Wick
18/06	Hackney Wick	66-42	Birmingham
15/06	Southampton	76-30	Norwich
18/06	Norwich	77-31	Southampton

=== Final ===
First leg

2 July 1938

Norwich Stars Max Grosskreutz 14 Bert Spencer 14 Wal Morton 14 Bill Bertwell 9 Jock Sweet 8 Dick Wise 7 Wilf Jay 5 Paul Goodchild 1	72 – 36	Hackney Wick Wolves Doug Wells 8 George Saunders 8 Frank Hodgson 7 Arch Windmill 4 Tommy Bateman 3 Jim Baylais 3 Ken Brett 3 Jack Tidbury 0

The Firs Stadium

Second leg

9 July 1938

Hackney Wick Wolves Doug Wells 16 Frank Hodgson 10 Arch Windmill 10 George Saunders 9 Tommy Bateman 9 Jack Tidbury 3 Jim Baylais 1 Ken Brett 0	58 – 49	Norwich Stars Wal Morton 12 Bert Spencer 9 Bill Bertwell 8 Max Grosskreutz 6 Alan Smith 6 Jock Sweet 3 Wilf Jay 3 Dick Wise 2

Hackney Wick Stadium

Norwich were the National Trophy Div 2 winners, winning on aggregate 121-94.

== Riders & final averages ==
Birmingham

- (England) Tiger Hart 8.82
- (Australia) Steve Langton 8.22
- (England) Danny Lee 6.28
- (England) Stan Lemon 6.19
- (Australia) Jack Hyland 5.51
- (England) Jeff Lloyd 5.39
- (England) Bob Lovell 5.22
- (England) Les Trim 5.17
- (South Africa) Keith Harvey 4.52
- (England) Lionel Stanger 3.30
- (England) Charlie Challis 3.20

Hackney

- (England) Frank Hodgson 10.06
- (England) Doug Wells 9.78
- (England) Arch Windmill 7.74
- (England) Nobby Stock 6.91
- (England) George Saunders 6.71
- (England) Tommy Bateman 6.48
- (England) Jim Baylais 6.29
- (England) Stan Dell 6.29
- (England) Jack Tidbury 6.27
- (Canada) Charlie Appleby 5.00

Lea Bridge

- (England) Lloyd Goffe 9.80
- (England) Dick Harris 8.67
- (England) Gus Kuhn 7.20
- (England) Will Lowther 6.76
- (Australia) Frank Dolan 6.58
- (England) Bob Wells 6.48
- (England) Ed Pye 6.29
- (England) Ron Clarke 5.69

Leeds

- (England) George Greenwood 10.77
- (England) Fred Strecker 6.00
- (England) Alex Peel 5.68
- (England) Fred Tuck 5.60
- (England) Geoff Godwin 4.76
- (England) Wilf Plant 4.55
- (England) Les Bowden 4.48
- (Australia) Don Hemingway 3.33
- (England) Roy Barrowclough 2.91
- (England) George Dykes 2.67

Newcastle

- (Canada) George Pepper 7.94
- (England) Rol Stobbart 6.81
- (Canada) Bruce Venier 6.62
- (Canada) Bob Sparks 6.50
- (England) Kid Curtis 6.41
- (England) Norman Hargreaves 6.35
- (Australia) Reg Hay 6.31
- (Canada) Elwood Stillwell 5.07
- (England) Maurice Stobbart 5.02

Norwich

- (Australia) Max Grosskreutz 10.89
- (England) Wal Morton 8.41
- (Australia) Bert Spencer 9.42
- (Scotland) Jock Sweet 7.09
- (Australia) Dick Wise 6.95
- (England) Bill Birtwell 6.29
- (England) Wilf Jay 6.20
- (England) Paul Goodchild 5.87
- (England) Alan Brooks Smith 5.25
- (England) Alex Peel 4.39
- (Australia) Syd Littlewood 3.24

Sheffield

- (Australia) Billy Lamont 8.88
- (England) Ted Bravery 8.33
- (England) Don Houghton 8.00
- (England) Stan Williams 7.46
- (England) Colin Watson 7.00
- (England) Tommy Allott 6.07
- (England) Paddy Mills (Horace Burke) 4.27
- (England) Les Gregory 3.76
- (England) Eric Blain 3.73
- (England) Harold Brailsford 3.05
- (England) Lionel Stanger 3.30
- (England) Harry Watson 2.67
- (England) Cliff Watson 2.55

Southampton

- (England) Frank Goulden 10.19
- (England) Billy Dallison 9.67
- (Australia) Bert Jones 8.27
- (Wales) Syd Griffiths 8.17
- (England) Ernie Rickman 8.06
- (England) Jim Boyd 6.33
- (England) Mike Erskine 5.33
- (England) Cyril Anderson 5.11
- (England) Ron Howes 4.53
- (England) Alf Kaines 3.30
- (England) Jack Adams 2.00

West Ham

- (Australia) Charlie Spinks 10.11
- (England) Colin Watson 9.36
- (England) Phil Bishop 8.98
- (England) Broncho Dixon 8.17
- (England) Ossie Powell 6.13
- (England) Dick Geary 5.38
- (Australia) Moff Jones 5.00
- (England) Len Steward 3.65
- (England) Cyril Browning 3.47
- (England) Butch Williams 3.17
- (England) Eddie Barker 3.09

== See also ==
- List of United Kingdom Speedway League Champions
- Knockout Cup (speedway)
