= 1939 Speedway National League Division Two =

British motorcycle speedway season

- League: National League Division Two
- Champions: n/a
- No. of competitors: 6
- National Trophy (Div 2 final): Sheffield Tigers
- English Speedway Trophy: Newcastle Diamonds
- Highest average: Frank Hodgson
- Division/s above: 1939 National League (Division One)

The 1939 National League Division Two was the second season of British speedway's National League Division Two. The season was never completed, due to the outbreak of World War II.

== Summary ==
As with the previous season, there were several team changes. Southampton Saints had moved up to the National League and Bristol Bulldogs had moved down to take their place. Other new entrants were Crystal Palace Glaziers, Stoke and Middlesbrough. Absentees from the end of the previous season were Lea Bridge, West Ham Hawks (West Ham's reserve team), Birmingham (Hall Green) and Leeds Lions.

Newcastle were leading the league at the point of abandonment. Crystal Palace Glaziers resigned after 10 matches and Stoke after 14 matches. Belle Vue Aces provided a team to complete Stoke's fixtures.

Middlesbrough withdrew after 8 matches despite the club's general manager Vic Wieland signing star rider George Greenwood.

== Uncompleted table Division Two ==
The season was incomplete due to the outbreak of World War II. Uncompleted table on September 1.

Team	PL	W	D	L	Pts
Newcastle Diamonds	15	10	0	5	20
Hackney Wick Wolves	13	7	0	6	14
Sheffield	8	6	0	2	12
Norwich Stars	12	6	0	6	12
Bristol Bulldogs	14	5	0	9	10
Stoke Potters+ Belle Vue Reserves+	14	4	0	10	8

+ Belle Vue Reserves replaced Stoke Potters mid-season. Stoke scored 4 points from 8 matches, Belle Vue reserves scored 4 points from 6 matches.

Middlesbrough and Crystal Palace Glaziers withdrew mid-season and their records were expunged.

== Fixtures & results ==
=== A fixtures ===
Home \ Away	BRI	CP	HAC	MID	NEW	NOR	SHE	STBV
Bristol		–	48–35	43–41	39–44	63–18	47–37	43–40
Crystal Palace	37–46		–	39–43	–	–	39–43	56–28
Hackney	53–29	–		44–40	46–38	–	45–38	60–24
Middlesbrough	64–20	61–23	–		–	47–37	–	–
Newcastle	46–36	58–25	54–29	–		50–34	–	59–25
Norwich	47–37	50–34	46–35	44–40	33–51		40–43	56–27
Sheffield	–	63–21	–	53–30	48–34	42–38		54–29
Stoke-Belle Vue	55–28	62–20	45–38	–	32–52	–	28–56	

Legend: Blue = home team win; Yellow = draw; Red = away team win.

=== B fixtures ===
Home \ Away	BRI	CP	HAC	NEW	NOR	SHE	STBV
Bristol		–	42–39	40–43	41–42	–	–
Crystal Palace	–		–	–	–	40–41	–
Hackney	45–39	–		51–33	–	–	52–31
Newcastle	52–29	–	–		–	–	44–40
Norwich	–	–	–	50–34		–	56–27
Sheffield	–	–	–	–	43–41		
Stoke-Belle Vue	–	–	45–39	42–41	–	–	

Legend: Blue = home team win; Yellow = draw; Red = away team win.

== Leading averages (league only) ==
Rider	Team	Average
Frank Hodgson	Hackney	11.29
Ernie Evans	Sheffield	11.25
George Pepper	Newcastle	11.13
Broncho Dixon	Sheffield	10.25
Bert Spencer	Norwich	9.67

== National Trophy ==
The 1939 National Trophy was the ninth edition of the Knockout Cup. Wembley and Belle Vue were declared joint winners following the abandonment of the final fixture due to the outbreak of the war. Sheffield Tigers won the Division 2 Final round and therefore qualified for the quarter finals proper (the round when the tier one sides entered the competition).

=== Qualifying quarterfinals ===
Date	Team one	Score	Team two
01/06	Sheffield	69-38	Norwich
27/05	Norwich	60-46	Sheffield
16/05	Bristol	83-22	Crystal Palace
27/05	Crystal Palace	35-65	Bristol
13/05	Hackney Wick	80-28	Stoke
25/05	Stoke	68-39	Hackney
15/05	Newcastle	60-48	Middlesbrough
26/05	Middlesbrough	61-46	Newcastle

=== Qualifying semifinals ===
Date	Team one	Score	Team two
30/06	Bristol	46-59	Sheffield
29/06	Sheffield	75-32	Bristol
w/o	Hackney Wick	w/o	Middlesbrough

=== Final ===
First leg

8 July 1939

Hackney Wick Wolves Frank Hodgson 15 Tiger Hart 13 Jim Baylais 11 George Saunders 9 Stan Dell 7 Nobby Stock 6 Arch Windmill 5 Doug Wells 1	67 – 39	Sheffield Tigers Jack Dixon 12 Stan Williams 9 Ernie Evans 8 Ossie Powell 4 Harry Whitfield 4 Paddy Mills 2 Doug McLachlan 0 Geoff Godwin 0

Hackney Wick Stadium

Second leg

13 July 1939

Sheffield Tigers Ernie Evans 18 Stan Williams 15 Jack Dixon 11 Ossie Powell 10 Paddy Mills 8 Doug McLachlan 6 Harry Whitfield 5 Geoff Godwin 2	75 – 33	Hackney Wick Wolves Frank Hodgson 7 Jim Baylais 7 Tiger Hart 6 George Saunders 5 Stan Dell 3 Arch Windmill 3 Nobby Stock 2

Owlerton Stadium

Sheffield were declared National League (Div 2) Champions, winning on aggregate 114–100.

== English Speedway Trophy ==
South

Home \ Away	BRI	CP	HAC	NOR
Bristol		51–32	22–59	40.5–43.5
Crystal Palace	33–46		43–40	35–46
Hackney	56–25	57–27		65–19
Norwich	60–24	64–20	46–38	

Legend: Blue = home team win; Yellow = draw; Red = away team win.

North

Home \ Away	MID	NEW	SHE	STO
Middlesbrough		42–41	57–26	49–34
Newcastle	41–42		47–37	63–21
Sheffield	46–37	40–44		46–35
Stoke	44–39	40–44	45–36	

Legend: Blue = home team win; Yellow = draw; Red = away team win.

Final

Team one	Team two	Score
Norwich	Newcastle	42–40
Newcastle	Norwich	44–40

== Riders and final averages ==
Bristol

- (England) Bill Clibbett 7.70
- (England) Jeff Lloyd 7.38
- (England) Harry Shepherd 7.14
- (England) Ron Howes 6.87
- (England) Roy Dook 6.43
- (Australia) Jack Bibby 6.00
- (Australia) Norman Lindsay 5.48
- (England) George Craig 5.07

Crystal Palace (withdrew)

- (England) Vic Weir 6.86
- (England) Bob Lovell 6.14
- (England) Mick Mitchell 6.06
- (England) Ron Clarke 6.00
- (South Africa) Keith Harvey 5.79
- (England) Les Trim 5.57
- (England) Ernie Pawson 5.00
- (England) George Gower 5.00
- (Canada) Charlie Appleby 4.67
- (England) Charlie Challis 4.13
- (England) Charlie Page 3.43
- (England) George Liddle 3.20
- (England) Alf Markham 2.40
- (England) George Dykes 1.50

Hackney

- (England) Frank Hodgson 11.29
- (England) Jim Baylais 9.62
- (England) Tiger Hart 8.71
- (England) Arch Windmill 7.29
- (England) Nobby Stock 6.93
- (England) George Saunders 6.13
- (England) Doug Wells 5.96
- (England) Ken Brett 5.14
- (England) Stan Dell 4.50

Middlesbrough (withdrew)

- (England) George Greenwood 11.13
- (England) Aub Lawson 9.33
- (England) Jack Hyland 9.11
- (England) Will Lowther 8.25
- (Canada) Fred Belliveau 6.50
- (England) Wilf Plant 5.91
- (England) Bob Wells 5.86
- (England) Tommy Bateman 5.85
- (England) Jack Tidbury 4.64

Newcastle

- (Canada) George Pepper 11.13
- (England) Rol Stobbart 9.29
- (Australia) Billy Lamont 7.54
- (England) Kid Curtis 7.60
- (England) Maurice Stobbart 6.07
- (England) Norman Hargreaves 5.40
- (Australia) Reg Hay 5.40
- (England) Will Goodall 4.00
- (Australia) Syd Littlewood 3.40

Norwich

- (Australia) Bert Spencer 9.67
- (England) Wal Morton 8.63
- (England) Wilf Jay 8.33
- (England) Bill Birtwell 8.00
- (Scotland) Jock Sweet 8.00
- (England) Alan Brooks Smith 7.83
- (Australia) Dick Wise 6.17
- (South Africa) Keith Harvey 6.09
- (England) Fred Strecker 5.83
- (England) Paul Goodchild 4.67
- (England) Sid Hipperson 3.00

Sheffield

- (Australia) Ernie Evans 11.25
- (England) Broncho Dixon 10.25
- (England) Stan Williams 9.48
- (England) Paddy Mills (Horace Burke) 5.88
- (England) Geoff Godwin 5.78
- (England) Harwood Pike 4.80
- (Australia) Doug McLachlan 3.74
- (England) Ossie Powell 3.25
- (England) Harry Whitfield 3.20
- (England) Don Houghton 2.29

Stoke/Belle Vue

- (England) Oliver Hart 8.25
- (England) Alan Butler 6.74
- (England) Ted Bravery 6.67
- (England) Fred Tuck 5.47
- (England) Tommy Allott 5.25
- (England) Fred Strecker 5.22
- (England) Jack Gordon 4.76
- (England) Bill Birtwell 4.00

== See also ==
- List of United Kingdom Speedway League Champions
- Knockout Cup (speedway)
