= 1946 Speedway Northern League =

British motorcycle speedway season

- League: Northern League
- No. of competitors: 6
- Champions: Middlesbrough Bears
- A.C.U Cup: Norwich Stars
- Highest average: Jeff Lloyd
- Division/s above: 1946 Speedway National League

The 1946 Northern League was a season of speedway racing in the United Kingdom for Northern British teams in 1946. With a National League in place and no Southern counterpart, it was effectively a second tier.

Four of the six entrants were previously members of National League Division Two before war broke out. Glasgow and Birmingham were new entrants.

Middlesbrough Bears won their first trophy. The Bears only lost four league fixtures and had three riders in the leading averages; Frank Hodgson, Fred Curtis and Will Plant all contributed significantly during the season.

During a fixture on 7 October at Brough Park the Birmingham Brummies Canadian rider Charlie Appleby crashed. A rider had fallen in front and in an effort to avoid the fallen rider, Appleby swerved and hit the machine instead. He was thrown into the air and suffered a fractured skull. He was taken to Newcastle Infirmary but died during the early hours of 8 October.

== Northern League Final table ==
Pos	Team	PL	W	D	L	Pts
1	Middlesbrough Bears	20	12	4	4	28
2	Sheffield Tigers	20	11	1	8	23
3	Norwich Stars	20	10	1	9	21
4	Birmingham Brummies	20	9	1	10	19
5	Newcastle Brough	20	8	1	11	17
6	Glasgow Tigers	20	6	0	14	12

== Fixtures & results ==
=== A fixtures ===
Home \ Away	BIR	GLA	MID	NEW	NOR	SHE
Birmingham		46–37	42–42	45–38	43–41	48–35
Glasgow	40–42		34–50	40–44	44–38	58–26
Middlesbrough	55–28	54–30		40–44	49–34	46–38
Newcastle	40–41	44–40	42–42		48–36	49–34
Norwich	58–26	41–43	50–32	51–33		42–40
Sheffield	39–44	45–39	43.5–39.5	50–34	45–39	

Legend: Blue = home team win; Yellow = draw; Red = away team win.

=== B fixtures ===
Home \ Away	BIR	GLA	MID	NEW	NOR	SHE
Birmingham		39–45	33–51	44–39	28–55	46–38
Glasgow	58–26		37–47	52–32	40–44	37–47
Middlesbrough	65–18	52–30		57–26	42–42	52–32
Newcastle	52–31	46–38	33–49		51–33	41–43
Norwich	52–32	51–32	44–40	51–32		40–44
Sheffield	45–39	48–36	42–42	49–35	45–38	

Legend: Blue = home team win; Yellow = draw; Red = away team win.

== A.C.U. Cup (Div 2) ==
On account of the small number of teams in the league the ACU Cup was run in a league format. Norwich Stars came out on top on points difference.

=== Final table ===
Pos	Team	PL	W	D	L	Pts
1	Norwich Stars	10	6	2	2	14
2	Middlesbrough Bears	10	7	0	3	14
3	Sheffield Tigers	10	6	0	4	12
4	Birmingham Brummies	10	4	1	5	9
5	Glasgow Tigers	10	3	0	7	6
6	Newcastle Brough	10	2	1	7	5

Home \ Away	BIR	GLA	MID	NEW	NOR	SHE
Birmingham		62–34	56–40	57–38	48–48	49–47
Glasgow	47–37		42–54	51–45	37–46	51–42
Middlesbrough	61–35	54–41		54–42	55–41	51–45
Newcastle	66–29	47–36	46–50		42–42	43–50
Norwich	51–45	64–32	55–28	48–46		51–45
Sheffield	58–38	55–41	51–45	57–39	52–43	

Legend: Blue = home team win; Yellow = draw; Red = away team win.

== Top five riders (league only) ==
	Rider	Nat	Team	C.M.A.
1	Jeff Lloyd	(England)	Newcastle	10.38
2	Frank Hodgson	(England)	Middlesbrough	10.38
3	Bert Spencer	(Australia)	Norwich	10.15
4	Tommy Allott	(England)	Sheffield	10.00
5	Stan Williams	(England)	Sheffield	9.75

== Riders & final averages ==
Birmingham

- (England) Tiger Hart 9.42
- (England) Doug Wells 9.04
- (England) Stan Dell 8.73
- (England) Roy Dook 8.00
- (Australia) Laurie Packer 6.40
- (England) Bob Lovell 5.46
- (England) Percy Brine 4.19
- (England) Ernie Appleby 3.67
- (England) Cyril Page 3.29
- (Canada) Charlie Appleby 3.12
- (England) Jimmy Wright 2.93
- (England) Dick Tolley 2.22

Glasgow

- (England) Will Lowther 9.67
- (England) Wal Morton 8.65
- (England) Joe Crowther 7.90
- (Australia) Gruff Garland 7.57
- (England) Maurice Stobbart 6.30
- (England) Eddie Lack 4.12
- (England) Charlie Oates 4.00
- (Scotland) Bill Baird 3.57
- (England) Wally Thomson 2.91
- (England) Jack Tidbury 2.67
- (Scotland) Bert Shearer 0.89

Middlesbrough

- (England) Frank Hodgson 10.38
- (England) Kid Curtis 9.68
- (England) Wilf Plant 9.45
- (England) Tip Mills 7.27
- (England) Geoff Godwin 6.95
- (England) Jack Hodgson 6.51
- (England) Ed Pye 6.45
- (England) Jack Gordon 6.29
- (Australia) Doug McLachlan 5.50
- (England) Len Tupling 4.71
- (England) Alex Peel 2.33

Newcastle

- (England) Jeff Lloyd 10.38
- (England) Norman Evans 8.90
- (Australia) Charlie Spinks 7.77
- (Australia) Doug McLachlan 6.86
- (Australia) Syd Littlewood 6.79
- (England) Alec Grant 4.51
- (Scotland) Leo Lungo 4.11
- (England) Terry Tight 3.70
- (England) Stan Pennell 2.00
- (England) Harry Modral 1.33

Norwich

- (Australia) Bert Spencer 10.15
- (England) Wilf Jay 9.00
- (England) Paddy Mills (Horace Burke) 8.20
- (England) Ted Bravery 7.59
- (England) Roy Duke 6.22
- (England) Sid Hipperson 5.71
- (England) Harwood Pike 4.52
- (England) Len Read 4.00
- (England) Don Houghton 3.94
- (Northern Ireland) Paddy Hammond 1.60
- (Australia) Bluey Thorpe 1.14
- (England) Charlie Challis 1.00

Sheffield

- (England) Tommy Allott 10.00
- (England) Stan Williams 9.75
- (England) Tommy Bateman 8.00
- (Australia) Jack Bibby 6.56
- (England) Dick Geary 5.64
- (England) John Duncan White 4.84
- (England) Stan Hodson 3.79
- (England) Reg Lambourne 3.75
- (England) Alf Elliott 3.49
- (England) Bruce Semmens 3.27

== See also ==
- List of United Kingdom Speedway League Champions
- Knockout Cup (speedway)
