= 1947 Speedway National League Division Two =

British motorcycle speedway season

- League: National League Division Two
- No. of competitors: 8
- Champions: Middlesbrough Bears
- National Trophy (Div 2): Middlesbrough Bears
- British Cup Div 2: Sheffield Tigers
- Highest average: Jeff Lloyd
- Division/s above: National League (Div 1)
- Division/s below: National League (Div 3)

The 1947 National League Division Two was the second post-war season of the second tier of motorcycle speedway in Great Britain. In the previous season, the league was known as the Northern League but the addition of Bristol Bulldogs and a third tier saw the name revert to the one used 8 years previously.

As well as Bristol Bulldogs, Wigan Warriors were new entrants bringing the total teams to 8. Middlesbrough Bears won the title. In fact the entire top five were unchanged from the previous season.

Norwich Stars 38-year-old rider Cyril Anderson died instantly on 16 August, during a best pairs event at Norwich. Anderson was leading when he skidded and was hit by a rider from behind Remarkably another rider died the same day, 27-year-old Wembley rider Nelson 'Bronco' Wilson received fatal injuries in a National Trophy match.

== Final Table Division Two ==
Pos	Team	PL	W	D	L	Pts
1	Middlesbrough Bears	28	20	0	8	40
2	Sheffield Tigers	28	17	2	9	36
3	Norwich Stars	28	16	0	12	32
4	Birmingham Brummies	28	14	0	14	28
5	Newcastle Diamonds	28	12	2	14	26
6	Bristol Bulldogs	28	11	0	17	22
7	Wigan Warriors	28	9	2	17	20
8	Glasgow Tigers	28	10	0	18	20

== Fixtures & results ==
=== A fixtures ===
Home \ Away	BIR	BRI	GLA	MID	NEW	NOR	SHE	WIG
Birmingham		53–31	60–24	44–40	47–36	47–34	55–29	48–36
Bristol	35–49		57.5–26.5	47–35	62–22	39–44	47–36	37–43
Glasgow	40–44	48–36		48–36	45–38	38–44	31–52	43–41
Middlesbrough	56–28	61–23	56–28		57–26	55–29	43–39	62–22
Newcastle	42–38	50–34	43–41	40–43		40–37	38–45	53–31
Norwich	46–38	58–26	58–25	48–36	47–37		45–39	54–30
Sheffield	60–24	60–24	58–26	34–50	42–42	54–29		65–19
Wigan	53–30	49–35	56–27	35–49	42–42	39–40	32–51	

Legend: Blue = home team win; Yellow = draw; Red = away team win.

=== B fixtures ===
Home \ Away	BIR	BRI	GLA	MID	NEW	NOR	SHE	WIG
Birmingham		44–40	59–24	39–45	35–49	48–36	45–39	47–37
Bristol	60–24		57–27	38–45	51–32	62–22	46–38	47–36
Glasgow	54–29	48–36		36–48	40–44	50–34	47–37	56–27
Middlesbrough	64–20	59–25	46–38		52–31	64–17	54–30	55–29
Newcastle	48–36	53–31	39.5–44.5	44–40		55–28	39–42	47–37
Norwich	55–28	55–29	61–23	47–37	52–32		37–46	56–26
Sheffield	58–26	57–27	57–27	49–34	54–29	46–37		56–28
Wigan	51–33	41–43	45–39	43–41	47–37	52–32	41–41	

Legend: Blue = home team win; Yellow = draw; Red = away team win.

== British Speedway Cup (Div 2) ==
The British Speedway Cup for Division Two was run in a league format. Sheffield Tigers came out on top.

=== Final table ===
Pos	Team	PL	W	D	L	Pts
1	Sheffield Tigers	14	11	0	3	22
2	Middlesbrough Bears	14	9	0	5	18
3	Norwich Stars	14	7	0	7	14
4	Wigan Warriors	14	7	0	7	14
5	Newcastle Diamonds	14	6	0	8	12
6	Bristol Bulldogs	14	6	0	8	12
7	Glasgow Tigers	14	5	0	9	10
8	Birmingham Brummies	14	5	0	9	10

Home \ Away	BIR	BRI	GLA	MID	NEW	NOR	SHE	WIG
Birmingham		59–37	59–37	45–50	53–42	56–40	37–59	66–28
Bristol	62–33		59–37	64–32	53–42	50–44	44–50	52–44
Glasgow	62–34	54–42		38–58	51–44	55–41	42–54	52–44
Middlesbrough	73–22	61–35	62–33		48.5–47.5	45–49	67–29	70–26
Newcastle	59–37	54–42	50–46	30–65		60–34	53–43	58–37
Norwich	60–36	73–23	63–33	51–45	61.5–34.5		44–51	55–40
Sheffield	63–32	76–20	56–40	56–40	59–37	66–30		68–28
Wigan	54–41	52–42	51–45	62–34	41–53	65–31	55–41	

Legend: Blue = home team win; Yellow = draw; Red = away team win.

== Top five riders (league only) ==
	Rider	Nat	Team	C.M.A.
1	Jeff Lloyd	(England)	Newcastle	10.67
2=	Stan Williams	(England)	Sheffield	10.40
2=	Bert Spencer	(Australia)	Norwich	10.40
4	Frank Hodgson	(England)	Middlesbrough	10.14
5	Kid Curtis	(England)	Middlesbrough	9.86

== National Trophy ==
The 1947 Division 2 National Trophy (sponsored by the Daily Mail) was the Knockout Cup for Division 2 teams. Middlesbrough and Norwich qualified for the quarter finals of the main National Trophy by virtue of finishing 1st & 2nd.

First round

Date	Team one	Score	Team two
13/06	Bristol	62–45	Wigan
07/06	Wigan	73–34	Bristol
04/06	Glasgow White City	60–46	Newcastle
02/06	Newcastle	63–45	Glasgow White City
12/06	Middlesbrough	81–27	Birmingham
07/06	Birmingham	50–57	Middlesbrough
12/06	Sheffield	57–51	Norwich
07/06	Norwich	60–47	Sheffield

Semifinals

Date	Team one	Score	Team two
03/07	Middlesbrough	73–34	Wigan
28/06	Wigan	45–63	Middlesbrough
30/06	Newcastle	56–52	Norwich
28/06/	Norwich	63–44	Newcastle

=== Final ===
First leg

17 July 1947

Middlesbrough Bears Frank Hodgson 16 Wilf Plant 14 Kid Curtis 13 Jack Hodgson 9 Ed Pye 7 Geoff Godwin 7 Bill Wilson 2 Herby King 0	69 – 38	Norwich Stars Phil Clarke 15 Geoff Revett 7 Jack Freeman 5 Ted Bravery 4 Paddy Mills 3 Cyril Anderson 2 Paddy Hammond 1 Len Read 1

Cleveland Park Stadium

Second leg

19 July 1947

Norwich Stars Paddy Mills 15 Jack Freeman 12 Paddy Hammond 8 Ted Bravery 6 Cyril Anderson 4 Phil Clarke 4 Len Read 0 Geoff Revett 0	50 – 58	Middlesbrough Bears Frank Hodgson 13 Kid Curtis 13 Wilf Plant 12 Herby King 6 Jack Hodgson 5 Geoff Godwin 5 Ed Pye 2 Bill Wilson 2

The Firs Stadium
Attendance: 18,000

Middlesbrough were National Trophy Division 2 Champions, winning on aggregate 127–88.

== Riders & final averages ==
Birmingham

- (England) Stan Dell 8.65
- (England) Tiger Hart 7.93
- (England) Roy Dook 7.54
- (England) Bob Lovell 6.91
- (Wales) Les Beaumont 6.46
- (England) Geoff Bennett 6.00
- (England) Brian Wilson 5.83
- (England) Dick Tolley 5.54
- (England) Ernie Appleby 5.24
- (England) Doug Wells 5.14
- (Australia) Laurie Packer 4.81
- (England) Mick Mitchell 3.80
- (England) Les Beaumont 2.77
- (England) George Gower 1.00

Bristol

- (England) Fred Tuck 9.50
- (England) Mike Beddoe 8.06
- (England) Jack Mountford 7.27
- (England) Billy Hole 6.86
- (England) Roger Wise 6.25
- (England) Eric Salmon 5.89
- (England) Jack Cooley 5.67
- (England) Cyril Quick 5.25
- (England) Frank Evans 4.28
- (England) George Craig 3.76

Glasgow

- (England) Will Lowther 9.28
- (England) Joe Crowther 7.76
- (Australia) Bat Byrnes 6.62
- (Scotland) Billy Bates 6.29
- (Australia) Gruff Garland 5.91
- (Australia) Junior Bainbridge 5.49
- (Australia) Norman Lindsay 5.41
- (Scotland) Bert Shearer 5.27
- (Australia) Buck Ryan 4.74
- (England) Harold Fairhurst 4.55
- (Scotland) Bill Baird 3.92
- (England) Harold Sharpe 3.43
- (Scotland) Gordon McGregor 2.88

Middlesbrough

- (England) Frank Hodgson 10.14
- (England) Kid Curtis 9.86
- (England) Wilf Plant 9.54
- (England) Jack Hodgson 7.49
- (England) Herby King 6.67
- (England) Geoff Godwin 6.57
- (England) Billy Wilson 5.67
- (England) Ed Pye 5.04
- (England) Tip Mills 4.34

Newcastle

- (England) Jeff Lloyd 10.67
- (England) Wilf Jay 8.99
- (England) Norman Evans 8.75
- (Australia) Doug McLachlan 8.54
- (England) Alec Grant 6.59
- (Australia) Ken Le Breton 4.78
- (New Zealand) Jack Hunt 4.00
- (England) Peter Lloyd 2.83
- (New Zealand) Danny Calder 2.00
- (England) Pat Smith 1.63
- (England) Harry Modral 1.14
- (England) Stan Pennell 0.71

Norwich

- (Australia) Bert Spencer 10.40
- (England) Paddy Mills (Horace Burke) 8.43
- (England) Phil Clarke 7.38
- (Northern Ireland) Paddy Hammond 6.98
- (England) Jack Freeman 6.86
- (England) Ted Bravery 6.36
- (England) Ossie Powell 6.27
- (England) Cyril Anderson 6.15
- (England) Sid Hipperson 5.73
- (England) Geoff Revett 5.19
- (Australia) Syd Littlewood 4.41
- (England) Roy Duke 4.27

Sheffield

- (England) Stan Williams 10.40
- (England) Tommy Bateman 9.11
- (Australia) Jack Bibby 8.83
- (England) Tommy Allott 8.63
- (England) Len Williams 7.42
- (England) Danny Lee 6.40
- (England) Bruce Semmens 6.24
- (England) John Duncan White 6.00
- (England) Alf Elliott 5.27
- (England) Dennis Parker 4.50
- (New Zealand) Dick Campbell 4.41

Wigan

- (England) Dick Geary 9.38
- (England) Jack Gordon 7.69
- (England) Norman Hargreaves 6.81
- (England) Reg Lambourne 5.79
- (England) Percy Brine 5.72
- (England) Don Houghton 5.43
- (England) Cyril Cooper 4.97
- (England) Ron Hart 3.80
- (England) Harry Welch 3.66
- (England) Jack Winstanley 2.84

== See also ==
- List of United Kingdom Speedway League Champions
- Knockout Cup (speedway)
