= 1933 Speedway National League =

British speedway league season

- League: National League
- No. of competitors: 10
- Champions: Belle Vue Aces
- National Trophy: Belle Vue Aces
- London Cup: Wembley Lions
- Highest average: Jack Parker

The 1933 National League was the fifth season of motorcycle speedway in the United Kingdom.

== Summary ==
Sheffield and Nottingham joined the league but the Stamford Bridge Pensioners dropped out. The National Association Trophy was dropped in favour of expanding the National League, with teams meeting each other home and away twice instead of once.

Belle Vue Aces won their first national title and completed the double by winning the Knockout Cup. Jack Parker of Clapton Saints finished with the highest average although Vic Huxley of Wimbledon Dons scored the most points

== Final table ==
Pos	Team	PL	W	D	L	Pts
1	Belle Vue Aces	36	31	0	5	62
2	Wimbledon Dons	36	23	0	13	46
3	West Ham Hammers	36	21	3	12	45
4	Crystal Palace Glaziers	36	21	0	15	42
5	Clapton Saints	36	19	3	14	41
6	Wembley Lions	36	19	1	16	39
7	Coventry	36	10	2	24	22
8	Sheffield Tigers	36	11	0	25	22
9	Plymouth Tigers	36	11	0	25	22
10	Nottingham	36	9	1	26	19

== Fixtures & results ==
=== A fixtures ===
Home \ Away	BV	CLA	COV	CP	NOT	PLY	SHE	WEM	WH	WIM
Belle Vue		27–36	46–17	45–14	46–16	44–19	45–18	32–30	41–21	34–29
Clapton	28–35		45–17	37–21	48–13	40–23	53–10	44–18	31–31	27–35
Coventry	25–38	25–38		33–29	41–21	18–45	38–25	27–34	24–39	20–42
Crystal Palace	37–26	40–20	44–18		41–22	45–17	49–11	39–23	41–21	42–21
Nottingham	18–41	41–22	41–21	24–38		45–17	33–30	24–35	0–36	22–41
Plymouth	34–29	20–42	38–21	33–30	46–16		32–31	34–29	32–31	31–32
Sheffield	25–38	18–45	44–18	23–40	35–23	32–31		25–38	36–26	32–29
Wembley	38–23	49.5–13.5	37–21	34–29	45–16	46–17	37–26		38–24	25–37
West Ham	23–39	34–29	44–15	36–24	44–18	40–22	46–16	46.5–16.5		36–23
Wimbledon	28–35	36–27	43–19	33–29	38–24	38–23	46–14	25–38	46–16	

Legend: Blue = home team win; Yellow = draw; Red = away team win.

=== B fixtures ===
Home \ Away	BV	CLA	COV	CP	NOT	PLY	SHE	WEM	WH	WIM
Belle Vue		33–30	50–13	33–30	49–14	52–11	45–17	32–31	37.5–24.5	43–20
Clapton	35–27		39–24	33–30	31–32	45–18	41–22	34–28	22–41	32–30
Coventry	28–35	31.5–31.5		26–36	45–17	51–12	43–18	42–21	34–28	26.5–36.5
Crystal Palace	30–33	32–29	32–30		37–25	41–22	32–31	42–21	30–31	46–17
Nottingham	29–34	40–18	30–33	32–31		40–21	39–23	25–37	30–30	27–35
Plymouth	21–42	24–38	18–45	30–32	36–23		31–30	35–27	21–42	30–33
Sheffield	25–38	30–33	39–23	41–22	37–26	38–25		33–30	29–34	35–26
Wembley	21–42	31–31	35–28	35–27	46–17	48–15	51–12		28–35	24–38
West Ham	26–36	32–30	31–31	26–37	43–16	40–23	37–26	36–27		37–25
Wimbledon	28–33	37–26	37–26	34–29	44–19	47–15	39–23	30–32	34.5–28.5	

Legend: Blue = home team win; Yellow = draw; Red = away team win.

== Top Ten Riders ==
		Nat	Team	C.M.A.
1	Jack Parker	(England)	Clapton	9.87
2	Claude Rye	(England)	Wimbledon	9.31
3	Dicky Case	(Australia)	Coventry	9.05
4	Vic Huxley	(Australia)	Wimbledon	9.03
5	Tom Farndon	(England)	Crystal Palace	8.94
6	Eric Langton	(England)	Belle Vue	8.88
7	Syd Jackson	(England)	Wimbledon	8.70
8	Wally Kilmister	(New Zealand)	Wembley	8.56
9	Bluey Wilkinson	(Australia)	West Ham	8.40
10	Tiger Stevenson	(England)	West Ham	8.33

== National Trophy ==
The 1933 National Trophy was the third edition of the Knockout Cup.

Preliminary round

Date	Team one	Score	Team two
08/07	Clapton	69-56	Coventry
06/07	Coventry	63-61	Clapton
24/06	Clapton	13a-15a	Coventry
22/06	Coventry	rain	Clapton
22/06	Nottingham	81-42	Plymouth
20/06	Plymouth	64-62	Nottingham

First round

Date	Team one	Score	Team two
27/07	Wembley	103-22	Nottingham
27/07	Clapton	80-43	Sheffield
22/07	Belle Vue	74-51	Wimbledon
22/07	Crystal Palace	63-63	West Ham
19/07	Nottingham	44-79	Wembley
19/07	Sheffield	71-55	Clapton
18/07	West Ham	55-69	Crystal Palace
17/07	Wimbledon	64-60	Belle Vue

Semifinals

Date	Team one	Score	Team two
02/09	Belle Vue	98-28	Clapton
30/08	Clapton	54-70	Belle Vue
19/08	Crystal Palace	62-63	Wembley
17/08	Wembley	77-48	Crystal Palace

a=abandoned

=== Final ===
First leg

28 September 1933

Wembley Lions Wally Kilmister 18 Harry Whitfield 10 Lionel Van Praag 9 Gordon Byers 8 Colin Watson 3 Norman Evans 3 Hal Herbert 2 Reg Bounds 1	54 – 72	Belle Vue Aces Eric Langton 19 Joe Abbott 14 Bill Kitchen 14 Frank Varey 13 Bob Harrison 7 Max Grosskreutz 5

Empire Stadium

Second leg

30 September 1933

Belle Vue Aces Frank Varey 18 Joe Abbott 17 Eric Langton 16 Max Grosskreutz 15 Bill Kitchen 15 Bob Harrison 11	92 – 33	Wembley Lions Lionel Van Praag 11 Wally Kilmister 9 Colin Watson 8 Gordon Byers 2 Maurice Stobbart 2 Hal Herbert 1 Norman Evans 0

Hyde Road

Belle Vue were National Trophy Champions, winning on aggregate 164-87.

== London Cup ==
First round

Team one	Score	Team two
Wimbledon	60–65, 77–49	Crystal Palace

Semi final round

Team one	Score	Team two
Wimbledon	71–54, 68–57	Clapton
West Ham	60–66, 46–77	Wembley

=== Final ===
First leg

28 August 1933

Wimbledon Vic Huxley 18 Syd Jackson 12 Gus Kuhn 11 Alf Sawford 6 Fred Leavis 4 Geoff Pymar 2	53–71	Wembley Colin Watson 22 Wally Kilmister 19 Ginger Lees 11 Harry Whitfield 8 Lionel van Praag 7 Norman Evans 3 Gordon Byers 1

Plough Lane

Second leg

31 August 1933

Wembley Harry Whitfield 20 Colin Watson 18 Wally Kilmister 14 Ginger Lees 10 Norman Evans 5 Reg Bounds 2	69–56	Wimbledon Vic Huxley 16 Syd Jackson 16 Gus Kuhn 13 Alf Sawford 8 Geoff Pymar 2 Fred Leavis 1

Empire Stadium

Wembley won on aggregate 140–109

== Riders & final averages ==
Belle Vue

- (England) Eric Langton 8.88
- (England) Bill Kitchen 8.20
- (England) Bob Harrison 7.39
- (England) Frank Varey 7.14
- (Australia) Max Grosskreutz 6.28
- (England) Frank Charles 6.12
- (England) Joe Abbott 5.93
- (England) Eric Gregory 5.63
- (England) Broncho Dixon 3.50

Clapton

- (England) Jack Parker 9.87
- (England) Norman Parker 7.96
- (England) Billy Dallison 6.83
- (England) Wally Lloyd 6.03
- (England) Phil Bishop 5.27
- (England) Roy Barrowclough 4.31
- (Australia) Billy Lamont 4.14
- (England) Alf Foulds 3.41
- (England) Cliff Parkinson 3.38
- (England) Arthur Westwood 3.00
- (England) Jim Kempster 2.68

Coventry

- (Australia) Dicky Case 9.05
- (England) Stan Greatrex 6.67
- (England) Roy Dook 6.19
- (England) Bill Pitcher 5.47
- (England) Triss Sharp 4.64
- (England) Wal Morton 4.50
- (England) Cyril Taft 3.92
- (England) Stan Dell 3.27
- (New Zealand) Alf Mattson 2.67
- (England) Arthur Tims 2.38

Crystal Palace

- (England) Tom Farndon 8.94
- (England) Ron Johnson 7.66
- (England) Joe Francis 7.34
- (England) Nobby Key 5.76
- (England) George Newton 4.70
- (England) Harry Shepherd 4.53
- (England) Lew Lancaster 2.59
- (Australia) Jack Jackson 2.50

Nottingham

- (New Zealand) Charlie Blacklock 5.84
- (England) Fred Strecker 5.42
- (England) Les Wotton 5.31
- (England) George Greenwood 5.08
- (Wales) Ivor Hill 4.81
- (Australia) Jack Chapman 4.64
- (Australia) Fred Tate 3.77
- (England) Charlie Shelton 3.52
- (England) George Dykes 2.82

Plymouth

- (England) Bill Clibbett 6.03
- (Australia) Bert Spencer 6.00
- (Austria) Sebastian Roth 5.80
- (Australia) Jack Sharp 5.01
- (England) Ted Bravery 5.05
- (England) Bill Stanley 4.85
- (England) Frank Goulden 4.37
- (Australia) Mick Murphy (John Glass) 3.72
- (England) Reg Stanley 3.58
- (England) Harry Bray 2.05

Sheffield

- (England) Squib Burton 7.91
- (England) Eric Blain 6.89
- (England) Tommy Gamble 5.27
- (England) Dusty Haigh 5.04
- (Australia) Ernie Evans 4.91
- (England) Larry Boulton 3.57
- (England) Henry Walker 3.38
- (England) Chun Moore 3.38
- (England) Wally Hull 3.00
- (England) John Deeley 2.59
- (England) Cliff Watson 2.40

Wembley

- (New Zealand) Wally Kilmister 8.56
- (England) Ginger Lees 8.26
- (England) Colin Watson 6.47
- (England) Gordon Byers 6.41
- (England) Harry Whitfield 6.00
- (Australia) Lionel Van Praag 5.08
- (England) Reg Bounds 3.47
- (England) Norman Evans 3.33
- (England) Maurice Stobbart 3.00
- (England) Hal Herbert 3.00

West Ham

- (Australia) Bluey Wilkinson 8.40
- (England) Tiger Stevenson 8.33
- (Denmark) Morian Hansen 6.00
- (England) Tommy Croombs 5.89
- (England) Tommy Allott 5.84
- (England) Arthur Atkinson 5.17
- (South Africa) Keith Harvey 3.60
- (England) Tiger Hart 3.26
- (England) Wal Morton 3.00
- (England) Rol Stobbart 2.46

Wimbledon

- (England) Claude Rye 9.31
- (Australia) Vic Huxley 9.03
- (England) Syd Jackson 8.70
- (England) Wal Phillips 6.78
- (England) Gus Kuhn 6.25
- (England) Alf Sawford 4.11
- (England) Geoff Pymar 3.85
- (England) Rube Sonny Wilson 2.25
- (England) Fred Leavis 2.23

== See also ==
- List of United Kingdom Speedway League Champions
- Knockout Cup (speedway)
