= Charlie Appleby =

Charlie Appleby may refer to:

- Charlie Appleby (racehorse trainer) (born 1975), British racehorse trainer
- Charlie Appleby (speedway rider) (1913–1946), Canadian speedway rider
