= Max Grosskreutz =

Australian speedway rider

- Born: 27 April 1906; Proserpine, Queensland
- Died: 20 September 1994 (aged 88)
- Nationality: Australian

Career history
- 1929: Lea Bridge
- 1930: Manchester White City
- 1931–1936: Belle Vue Aces
- 1938: Norwich Stars
- 1947–1948: Odsal Boomerangs

Individual honours
- 1929, 1936: Australian Champion
- 1936, 1946: NSW State Champion

Team honours
- 1933, 1934, 1935, 1936: National League Champion
- 1931: Northern League Champion
- 1933, 1934, 1935, 1936: National Trophy winner
- 1934, 1935, 1936: A.C.U. Cup winner
- 1938: Provincial Trophy winner

Max Octavius Grosskreutz (27 April 1906 in Proserpine, Queensland – 20 September 1994) was an Australian speedway rider.

== Speedway career ==
Grosskreutz finished third in the Star Riders' Championship in 1935, the forerunner to the Speedway World Championship which began a year later in 1936.

Grosskreutz won the Australian Championship at Davies Park Speedway in Brisbane in 1929 and again in 1936 at the famous Sydney Showground. He was also NSW State Champion in 1936 and 1946.

Grosskreutz moved to the Belle Vue Aces in 1931. He stayed with the aces until the end of the 1936 season when he retired to manage the Norwich Stars. During this time, he made 41 Test Match appearances for Australia. He did however ride for Norwich during the 1938 Speedway National League Division Two and topped the league averages.

1937 cigarette card

In 1947, Grosskreutz made a comeback, riding for the Odsal Boomerangs and made three further Test Match appearances.

== Players cigarette cards ==
Grosskreutz is listed as number 17 of 50 in the 1930s Player's cigarette card collection.
