= Wally Lloyd =

British motorcycle speedway rider

- Born: 6 February 1910; Birmingham, England
- Died: 11 February 1989 (aged 79)
- Nationality: British (English)

Career history
- 1928–1929, 1934: Hall Green/Birmingham Bulldogs
- 1929–1930: Perry Barr
- 1930: Crystal Palace Glaziers
- 1931: Lea Bridge
- 1932: Southampton Saints
- 1932-1933: Clapton Saints
- 1935: Hackney Wick Wolves
- 1936–1937: Wembley Lions
- 1938: Wimbledon Dons
- 1946–1948: Belle Vue Aces

Team honours
- 1938, 1946, 1947: National Trophy Winner
- 1938: London Cup Winner
- 1946: A.C.U. Cup Winner

Walter Richard Lloyd known as Wally Lloyd (6 February 1910 – 11 February 1989) was a motorcycle speedway rider who rode in the earliest days of the sport in Britain. He earned eight international caps for the England national speedway team.

== Biography ==
Born in Birmingham, Lloyd began his speedway career in 1928 at the Hall Green track. When the Hall Green track closed, in 1929 he moved to Perry Barr, captaining the team at the age of 17, and earning the nickname "Whirlwind" for his racing style. He started the 1930 season with Perry Barr in the Southern League, but after the team resigned from the league after four matches he moved on to Crystal Palace. He went on to ride for Lea Bridge in 1931, Southampton/Clapton Saints in 1932, and Clapton in 1933. He returned to Hall Green in 1934 before moving to Hackney Wick in 1935. Two seasons followed with Wembley before he joined Wimbledon in 1938, where he stayed until league speedway's suspension due to World War II.

Lloyd represented England several times between 1937 and 1939, and also rode and promoted the sport in South Africa.

In 1946, with league speedway resuming, Lloyd joined Belle Vue and rode in the British Riders' Championship as well as riding again for England in the Test series against Australia in 1947 and 1948. He retired after the 1948 season and in 1949 took on the role of manager for the re-opened Walthamstow Wolves team.

== Family ==
Lloyd's two brothers Johnny and Jeff were both professional speedway riders.

== Players cigarette cards ==
Lloyd is listed as number 29 of 50 in the 1930s Player's cigarette card collection.
