= Kid Curtis =

British speedway rider

- Born: 12 October 1920; Kensal Green, London, England
- Nationality: British (English)

Career history
- 1938–1939: Newcastle Diamonds
- 1946–1947: Middlesbrough Bears
- 1948–1953: West Ham Hammers
- 1954–1955: Oxford Cheetahs

Team honours
- 1946, 1947: League champion (tier 2)
- 1947: National Trophy (tier 2)

Frederick George Curtis (born 12 October 1920) is an English former motorcycle speedway rider.

== Biography ==
Curtis, Kensal Green, London, began his speedway career in 1937, with the West Ham Hawks (the junior side of the West Ham Hammers).

The following season in 1938, Curtis started his British leagues career riding for Newcastle Diamonds during the 1938 Speedway National League Division Two season and was hailed as a 'coming star'. It was at Newcastle that he improved significantly as a rider, averaging 7.60 during the 1939 Speedway National League Division Two, which was halted due to World War II. Sadly for Curtis, Newcastle were leading the league at the time. It was also during 1938 that Curtis represented Canada on several occasions as a guest rider and was a regular at Edinburgh speedway.

Curtis moved to London and rode various meetings during 1940 but lost five years of his career due to the war. He joined Middlesbrough Bears to ride in the 1946 Speedway Northern League and was an instant hit, averaging an impressive 9.68 and helping the Bears win the league title. The Middlesbrough team then won the league and cup double during the 1947 Speedway National League Division Two and Curtis' average of 9.86 was the fifth highest in the league.

Curtis' exploits came to the attention of his first club West Ham, who signed him to ride in the 1948 Speedway National League in a £1,500 deal that also saw Benny King go to Middlesbrough. Although Curtis raced six years for West Ham, he did not produce the form that was expected of him. In 1954, Oxford Cheetahs signed him for the 1954 Speedway National League Division Two season. He rode two seasons for the club before retiring.

It is known that Curtis owned a sweet shop but little is known about his post racing life.
