= Charlie Appleby (speedway rider) =

Canadian speedway rider

- Born: October 10, 1913; Saskatchewan, Canada
- Died: 8 October 1946 (aged 32); Newcastle-Upon-Tyne, England

Career history
- 1937: Birmingham Bulldogs
- 1938-1939: Hackney Wick Wolves
- 1939: Crystal Palace Glaziers
- 1946: Birmingham Brummies

Team honours
- 1938: National Div II Champions

Robert Charles Appleby (born 10 October 1913 in Saskatchewan, Canada - died 8 October 1946) was a speedway rider from Canada.

== Career ==
Appleby was a member of the Hackney Wick Wolves team that won the National League Division II Championship in 1938. He signed for Crystal Palace Glaziers for the 1939 Speedway National League Division Two season but the team withdrew from the league after ten matches.

After the end of World War II, Appleby returned to the UK and was signed by the Birmingham Brummies. He was enjoying a steady season but on 7 October he was involved in a crash at Brough Park.

During the Northern League fixture on 7 October, Appleby crashed in an effort to avoid a fallen rider in front. Appleby swerved and hit the machine instead. He was thrown into the air and suffered a fractured skull. He was taken to Newcastle Infirmary but died during the early hours of 8 October.

== See also ==
- Rider deaths in motorcycle speedway
