= Norwich Stars =

Motorcycle speedway team based in Norwich, England

Club information
- Track address: The Firs Stadium; Cromer Road; Norwich
- Country: England
- Founded: 1930
- Closed: 1964
- Team manager: Max Grosskreutz; Dick Wise; Fred Evans; Gordon Parkins
- Team captain: Dick Wise; Bert Spencer; Phil Clarke; Aub Lawson; Reg Trott

Club facts
- Colours: Green with Yellow Star
- Track size: 425 yards (389 m)
- Track record holder: Peter Craven & Ove Fundin

Major team honours
National Trophy (tier 1)	1955, 1963
National League Div 2	1950, 1951
Provincial Trophy	1938
ACU Cup (Div 2)	1946
National Trophy (tier 2)	1938, 1951
Southern Shield	1951

Norwich Stars were a motorcycle speedway team based in Norwich, England, which operated from 1930 until their closure in 1964.

== History ==
=== Origins and 1930s ===
Speedway came to Norwich in August 1930 when the Eastern Speedways Motor Club arranged fixtures at The Firs Stadium in Cromer Road, Hellesdon. By the fourth successive season in 1933, sidecars were also introduced. Sporadic racing continued to be organised through 1934 and 1935 but had ceased in 1936.

In January 1937, the famous rider Max Grosskreutz announced his retirement in order to take a lease on the Firs Stadium. Grosskreutz entered a team for the 1937 Provincial Speedway League and the first fixture was at home to Liverpool Merseysiders, on 1 May in a national Trophy match. The services of riders were secured, including Wal Morton, Bert Spencer and Dick Wise and the nickname Stars was adopted.

After a solid first season the team were boosted by the decision of Grosskreutz to come out of retirement, captain and ride for the Stars. The Australian topped the league averages and helped Norwich win both the division 2 National Trophy and the Provincial Trophy.

=== 1940s ===
After World War II, the Norwich Stars (now without Grosskreutz) raced in the 1946 Speedway Northern League and added more silverware by winning the A.C.U. Cup. Huge post war attendances were experienced at the Firs Stadium and Dick Wise became the team manager. The Stars continued to compete in the National League Division Two from 1947 to 1951.

=== 1950s ===
The Stars won the League Championship in both 1950 and 1951. The riders largely responsible for the success were Paddy Mills, Phil Clarke, Bob Leverenz and Fred Rogers.

The Stars were invited into the National League Division One in 1952 but initially struggled before improving in subsequent seasons, winning the National Trophy during the 1955 Speedway National League season and finished runners-up behind Wimbledon Dons in the 1958 Speedway National League. The leading riders during the 1950s were Billy Bales, Aub Lawson and the legendary Ove Fundin (Norwich's greatest ever rider and eventually a five times world champion).

=== 1960s ===
Fundin continued to dominate the British league averages but lacked support to make Norwich a championship contender. However, fellow Swede Olle Nygren was signed in 1962 and Terry Betts' improvement supported Fundin and as a consequence the Stars won the 1963 National Trophy to equal their highest honour. Additionally, the team finished runner-up to Belle Vue Aces in the 1963 Speedway National League.

The Stars raced in the top flight until the stadium was closed at the end of the 1964 season, when the track and stadium were sold for re-development.

=== 2010s ===
In July 2012, former rider Ove Fundin played a part in announcing a return of speedway in the city of Norwich. Plans, which did not come to fruition, were outlined for a new track to be built on the city's outskirts, with the hope of a return to the British league structure.

== Season summary ==
Year and league	Position	Notes
1937 Provincial Speedway League	5th	
1938 Speedway National League Division Two	2nd	Provincial Trophy & National Trophy (div 2) winners
1939 Speedway National League Division Two	4th+	+ when league suspended
1946 Speedway Northern League	3rd	A.C.U Cup winners
1947 Speedway National League Division Two	3rd	
1948 Speedway National League Division Two	5th	
1949 Speedway National League Division Two	3rd	
1950 Speedway National League Division Two	1st	champions
1951 Speedway National League Division Two	1st	champions & National Trophy (div 2) winners
1952 Speedway National League	10th	
1953 Speedway National League	7th	
1954 Speedway National League	4th	
1955 Speedway National League	6th	National Trophy winners
1956 Speedway National League	4th	
1957 Speedway National League	4th	
1958 Speedway National League	2nd	
1959 Speedway National League	4th	
1960 Speedway National League	5th	
1961 Speedway National League	7th	
1962 Speedway National League	5th	
1963 Speedway National League	2nd	National Trophy winners
1964 Speedway National League	3rd	

== Notable riders ==
- (England) Billy Bales
- (England) Terry Betts
- (England) Phil Clarke
- (Sweden) Ove Fundin
- (England) Jimmy Gooch
- (Australia) Max Grosskreutz
- (England) Trevor Hedge
- (Australia) Aub Lawson
- (Australia) Bob Leverenz
- (England) Paddy Mills
- (England) Wal Morton
- (Sweden) Olle Nygren
- (England) Geoff Pymar
- (England) Cyril Roger
- (England) Fred Rogers
- (Australia) Bert Spencer
- (Australia) Dick Wise

== Fatalities ==
Four riders from 1947 to 1951 died at the Norwich track. Norwich's 38-year-old rider Cyril Anderson died instantly on 16 August 1947, during a Best Pairs event. Anderson was leading when he skidded and was hit by a rider from behind. 32-year-old Bill Wilson of the Middlesbrough Bears was fatally injured, on 3 July 1948, at Norwich and died two days later in hospital.

The third rider died on 1 July 1950. Jock Shead riding for Halifax Dukes was killed during the semi-final of the National Trophy. Shead's bike collided with another bike and he somersaulted before landing, he was taken to hospital but died shortly afterwards. The following year, 21-year-old Bob Howes was killed when he hit the fence during a training practice race on 10 November 1951.

Norwich rider Malcolm Flood died on 2 April 1956, at Poole. The 25-year-old rider suffered fatal injuries despite an earlier warning from the race steward that he was riding too erratically into the bends.

The Firs Stadium was arguably the deadliest track in the country and claimed another life on 24 July 1960. Derek 'Tink' Maynard of the Belle Vue Aces was fatally injured in a crash on 23 July 1960. Maynard was competing in the second leg of the National Trophy against Norwich when Slant Payling lost control of his bike and it hit Maynard. Both riders were taken to Norwich Hospital but Maynard died the following morning.
