= Dick Wise =

Australian speedway rider

- Born: 8 September 1909; Adelaide, South Australia, Australia
- Died: 28 June 1982 (aged 72)
- Nationality: Australian

Career history
- 1929–1930: Sheffield Blades
- 1931–1932: Stamford Bridge Pensioners
- 1933: Nottingham
- 1934: Birmingham Bulldogs
- 1936: Plymouth Panthers
- 1937–1939: Norwich Stars

Team honours
- 1938: Provincial Trophy winner

Richard Garrett Wise (8 September 1909 – 28 June 1982) was a motorcycle speedway rider from Australia.

== Career ==
Wise was one of the early speedway pioneer riders that arrived in the United Kingdom from Australia to race in the Britain. He started riding in the UK during 1929 and would also join the Sheffield team during the 1929 Speedway English Dirt Track League season. The following season in 1930, he remained with Sheffield.

In 1931, Wise returned to his home country for the Australian speedway season after an absence of three years. He went back to England after spells in Australia and South America and joined the Stamford Bridge Pensioners for the 1931 Speedway Southern League season and was still with the club on the formation of the first National League in 1932. He finished third in the 1932 Australian Championship but broke his leg for the second time during the same year.

Wise would go on to ride for Nottingham (1933), Birmingham Bulldogs (1934) and Plymouth Panthers (1936) but had a fractured 1935 season, riding a few exhibition matches and appearing for Harringay reserves.

In 1937, Wise joined the Norwich Stars and soon established East Anglia as his home, becoming the club captain. He remained with the club as captain until the outbreak of World War II, which forced speedway to stop for the duration.

After the war, Wise became the team manager of Norwich.

== Players cigarette cards ==
Wise is listed as number 50 of 50 in the 1930s Player's cigarette card collection.
