= Roland Stobbart =

British motorcycle speedway rider

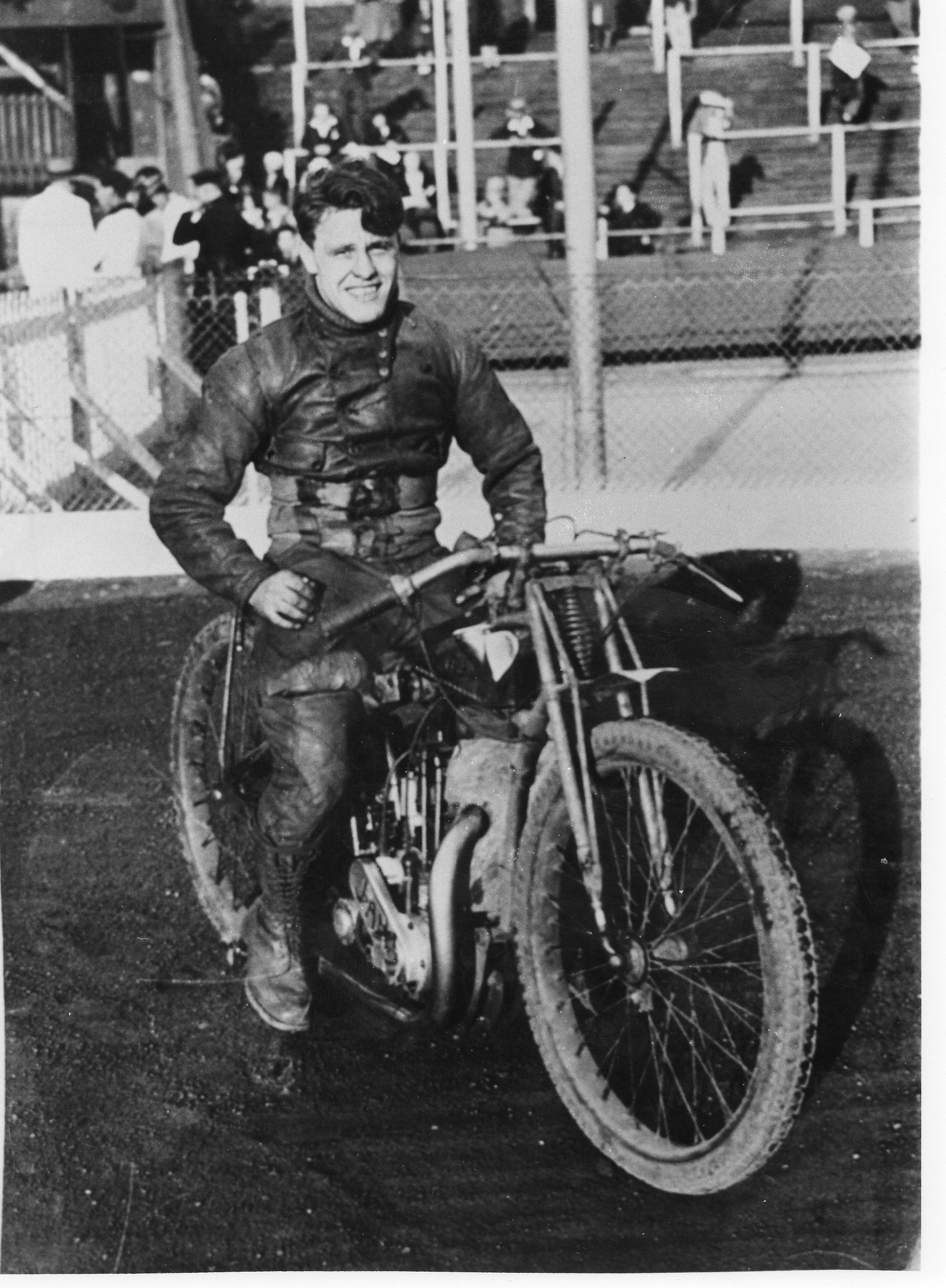
- Born: 26 December 1909; Aspatria, England
- Died: 6 March 1981 (aged 71); Wigton, England
- Nationality: British (English)

Career history
- 1931: Preston
- 1931: Leeds Lions
- 1932-1936: West Ham Hammers
- 1936: Harringay Tigers
- 1937: Wimbledon Dons
- 1937-1938: Bristol Bulldogs
- 1938-1939, 1948: Newcastle Diamonds
- 1949: Ashfield Giants

Team honours
- 1937: Provincial League

Roland Stobbart (26 December 1909 - 6 March 1981) was an English speedway rider and promoter. He earned two international caps for the England national speedway team.

== Biography ==
=== Early days ===
Roland Stobbart was born at Aspatria, Cumberland, England in 1909; the eldest of two sons to an haulage contractor. Even before he reached maturity, one Cumberland newspaper was describing him as, "probably the finest racing motorcyclist in Cumberland. A clever, daring rider who does not know the meaning of the word fear." He was at that time attached to the Workington Motor Cycling Club. By the age of twenty, he had met with considerable success on Dirt tracks and Grasstracks throughout the north of England and had successfully taken part in sand races in Scotland. When they introduced grass track racing at Whitehaven, he became the principal prize-winner. In 1930, he entered the senior Manx Grand Prix on the Isle of Man, formerly known as the Manx Amateur Motorcycle Road Race. Although he buckled his front wheel half-a-mile from the start, he continued the race and the distance of over 200 miles with a soft tyre and a badly bent wheel. His average speed was 64.7 miles per hour, and he did the fastest lap at 68 miles per hour. Stobbart entered the race in the following two years but despite doing good times in the practice laps he failed to complete either of the races. In 1932 he retired after the first lap when he suffered a puncture.

=== Workington ===
The first motor cycle cinder track race at Workington took place at Lonsdale Park on 15 August 1931. The event promoted by the Workington Motor Cycle Club was the brainchild of Stobbart. A total of 32 competitors from all over the North of England, including future world finalist Bill Kitchen, took part in a series of 'scratch' and 'handicap' events in a 21-race programme and attracted over 2,000 spectators. Both Stobbart and his younger brother Maurice both competed, and although Sheffield rider, George Mortimer, won both events Roland set the course record and beat him in the Cumberland versus Yorkshire match. The winner of the 'scratch' event received the princely sum of £5, while second and third received £3 and £1-10 shillings (£1.50p) respectively. Meanwhile, the winner of the 'handicap' event picked up £4, with the second and third placed riders collecting £2 and £1-10 shillings (£1.50p) each. Notwithstanding the size of the crowd, this inaugural meeting was a financial disaster and in consequence no more meetings took place that year. However, the banked, narrow circuit, at 439 yards per lap had provided fast and exciting racing despite its narrow width restricting races to only three riders. In 1932, the 'Border Sports Club' promoted a total of eight meetings, held at fortnightly intervals, and attracted crowds averaging 3,000 for each meeting. On 28 June, Roland, who often raced with a cigarette between his lips, broadsided, skidded and wobbled four times round the rain soaked track at 45 miles per hour to set a new one mile record for the Workington track of 1 min 19.2 seconds, two seconds short of the then British record. At these events, Stobbart won both the Golden Sash. and the Golden Helmet.

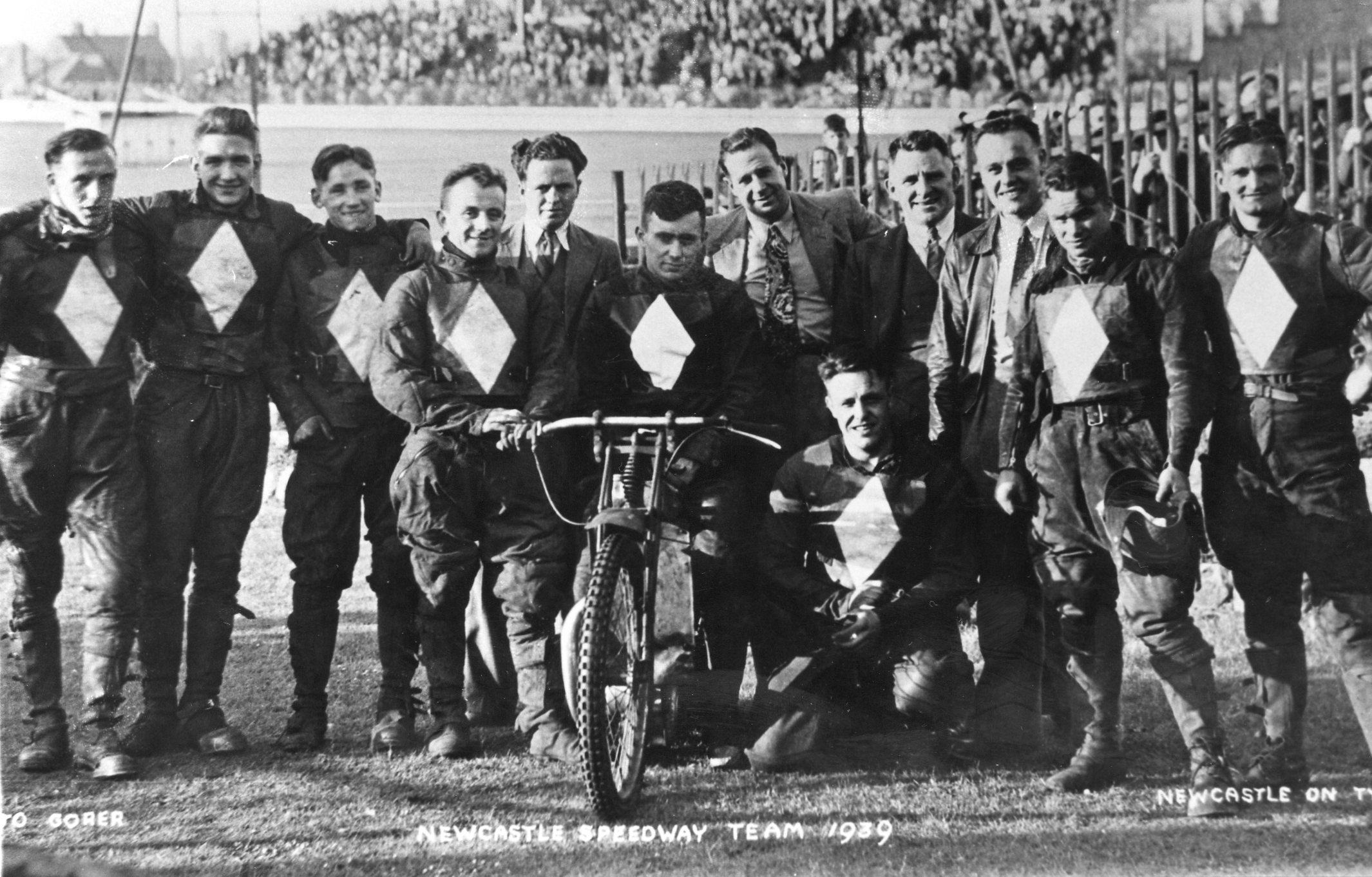
Newcastle Diamonds Speedway Team

=== National Speedway ===
Stobbart began his English national Speedway career riding for Leeds Lions during the 1931 season, while simultaneously riding at Workington. In 1932, after a short spell with Preston he moved to West Ham Hammers, after the Lancashire club folded. He remained with the ‘Hammers’ until he moved to Provincial league Bristol in 1937. In 1938, he rode for the Newcastle Diamonds, where he remained until World War II disrupted his career. In the 1939 season, he was a sensation. He bought a motorcycle from Arthur Atkinson for £15 and then proceeded to score 16 out of 18 points at Newcastle, 8 out of 9 points at Edinburgh, 9 out of 12 at Sheffield, and 10 out of 12 at Hackney, London. During the 1948 season, he came out of retirement to act as Newcastle second reserve.

=== International honours ===
On 1 November 1935, Stobbart left Aspatria to sail for Australia as a member of the England team chosen to ride in the test matches that winter. He was accompanied by Arthur Atkinson, Harold Tiger Stevenson, Joe Abbott, Dusty Haigh and Jack Parker. He was selected again in season 1939 when he rode for England against the Dominions.

=== Promoter and manager ===
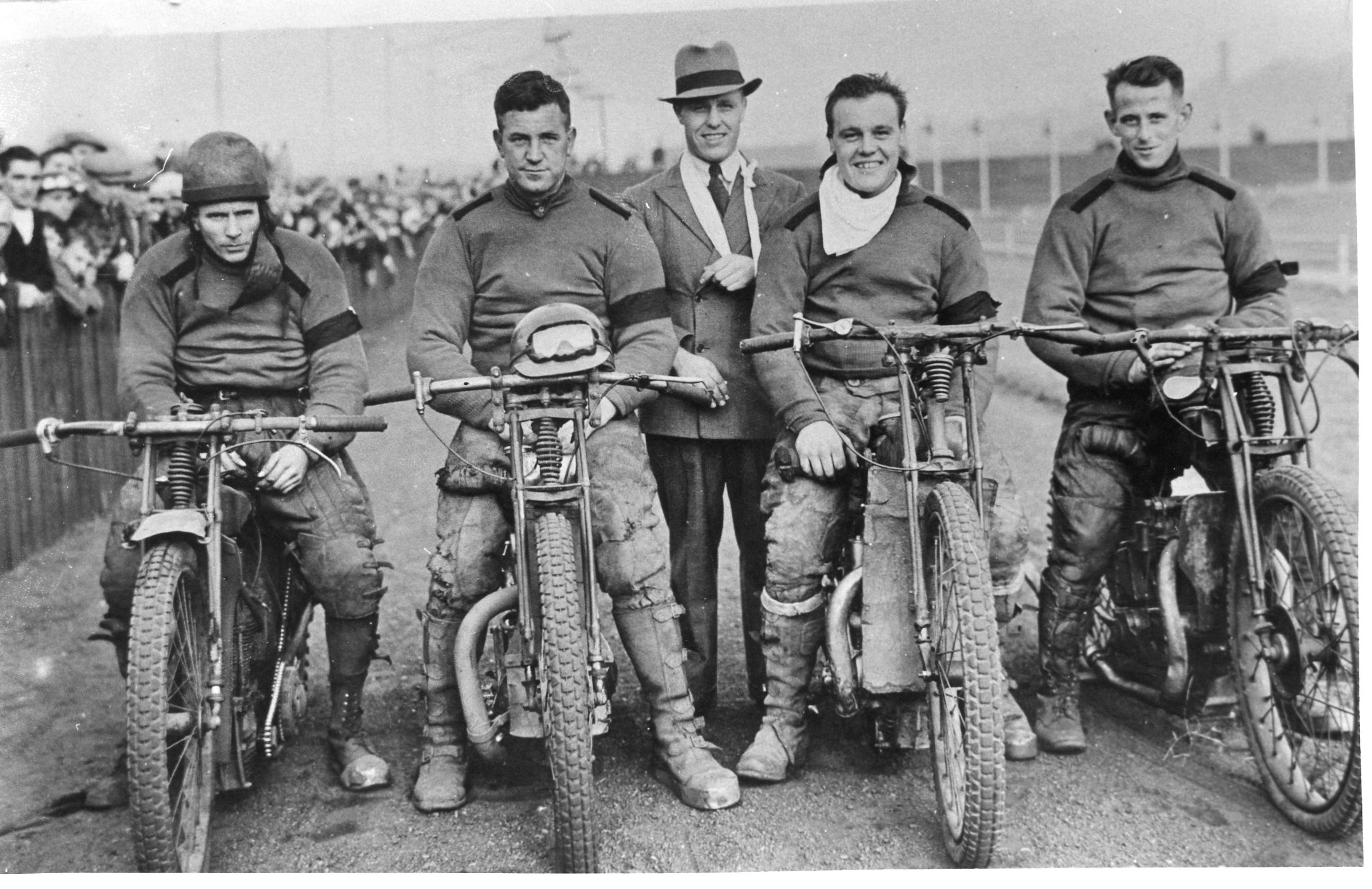
Bill Desmond, Sam Marsland, Roland Stobbart, Maurice Stobbart & A# S# Rosenfeld

In 1937, Stobbart broke his arm while riding for West Ham and as a consequence took no further part in that year's campaign. He instead became manager of Workington, a position he retained in 1938; introducing riders of the calibre of George Greenwood, George Pepper, Charlie Spinks and Norman Hargreaves. He also promoted Speedway at Dam Park, Ayr in 1937, and Carlisle in the same year. In 1933, Stobbart became a minor celebrity, appearing as a stuntman in a film entitled Money for Speed, starring Ida Lupino and John Lauder.

== Bibliography ==
- Ron Hoare (1979). Speedway Panorama. London: Haynes.
