= Doug McLachlan =

Australian motorcycle speedway rider (1908 – 1987)

- Born: 8 September 1908; Sydney, Australia
- Died: 31 January 1987 (aged 78); Bundeena, New South Wales
- Nationality: Australian

Career history
- 1939: Sheffield
- 1946: Middlesbrough Bears
- 1946–1947: Newcastle Diamonds
- 1948–1950: Birmingham Brummies

Team honours
- 1948: National Trophy (tier 2)
- 1948: Anniversary Cup (Div 2) winner

Dudley Sutcliffe McLachlan (8 September 1908 – 31 January 1987) was an international motorcycle speedway rider from Australia. He earned two international caps for the Australia national speedway team.

== Biography ==
McLachlan, born in Sydney, was the top scorer in Australia's 1939 spring league and was recruited by Sheffield Tigers manager Bluey Wilkinson. He began his British leagues career riding for Sheffield during the 1939 Speedway National League Division Two season.

After an enforced break due to World War II, where he remained in Britain, McLachlan rode for Middlesbrough Bears and Newcastle Diamonds during 1946. The following season he averaged 8.54 for Newcastle.

The 1948 season saw McLachlan switch to Birmingham Brummies, where he spent his final three seasons in Britain, winning the 1948 National Trophy. In-between he reached the Championship round of the 1949 Individual Speedway World Championship.

McLachlan returned to Australia and became the promoter at Parramatta speedway.
