= Tiger Stevenson =

British motorcycle speedway racer

- Born: 1 November 1907; Sunbury-On-Thames, Surrey, England
- Died: 5 December 1994 (aged 87); Poole, England
- Nationality: British (English)

Career history
- 1929-1939: West Ham Hammers

Individual honours
- 1933/34: NSW State Champion

Team honours
- 1937: National League Champions
- 1938: ACU Cup Winner

Harold Montague Stevenson (1 November 1907 – 5 December 1994) was a motorcycle speedway racer from England. He earned 27 international caps for the England national speedway team.

== Career ==
Stevenson rode for the West Ham Hammers from 1929 until 1939 in early pioneer days, captaining the club for most of them. He was captain for their first ever meeting on 2 May 1929 at home to Coventry and was still the captain in 1937 when the Hammers won the National League Championship. He was born in London, England. He rode for England in the first Test series against Australia in 1930. He was made the England captain for the test match against Australia in June 1933.

In 1935, Stevenson travelled to Australia and finished runner up in the Australian Championship.

When speedway returned after World War II, Stevenson opened speedway training schools at Birmingham and Bristol to tutor a new generation of riders. He also took the role of managing the Hanley Potters.

When the West Ham Stadium at Custom House was demolished in 1973, one of the roads built on the site was named after Stevenson. During the sixties Tiger managed the Red Star Tyre Service in Katherine Road East Ham.

== Players cigarette cards ==
Stevenson is listed as number 43 of 50 in the 1930s Player's cigarette card collection.
