= Tommy Bateman =

British motorcycle speedway rider

- Born: 30 December 1908; Gainsborough, Lincolnshire, England
- Died: 4 February 1993 (aged 84); Scunthorpe, North Lincolnshire
- Nationality: British (English)

Career history
- 1937: Nottingham
- 1938: Hackney Wick Wolves
- 1939: Middlesbrough
- 1939: Belle Vue Aces Reserves
- 1946–1949: Sheffield Tigers
- 1950: Newcastle Diamonds

Team honours
- 1937: Provincial Trophy
- 1937: Provincial League Coronation Cup
- 1938: National League Div 2 winner
- 1947: British Speedway Cup (Div 2) winner

Thomas John Bateman (30 December 1908 – 4 February 1993) was a motorcycle speedway rider from England.

== Biography ==
Bateman, born in Gainsborough, Lincolnshire, was a well known grasstrack rider before moving into conventional speedway. He began his British leagues career riding for Nottingham during the 1937 Provincial Speedway League and helped the team win the league title. Later that season, he travelled to Australia to race.

Bateman was coveted after an impressive first season by various clubs, including Wimbledon, Norwich and Belle Vue. He eventually signed for Hackney Wick Wolves, which turned out to be fortunate because he won the league title again.

Bateman started riding for Middlesbrough in the top division during 1939 before they withdrew from the league after just eight matches. He found consolation with the Belle Vue reserve team but the season was cut short by World War II.

After the war, Bateman joined the Sheffield Tigers recording a solid 8.00 season average and helping Sheffield into second place. The team won the British Speedway Cup in 1947, with Bateman improving his average to 9.11.

Bateman's last season was the 1950 Speedway National League Division Two, when he moved to ride for the Newcastle Diamonds averaging an impressive 9.67.
