= Paddy Mills (speedway rider) =

British speedway rider

- Born: 24 July 1912; Leicester, England
- Died: 29 January 1975 (aged 62)
- Nationality: British (English)

Career history
- 1937: Leicester Hounds
- 1938-1939: Sheffield Tigers
- 1946-1952: Norwich Stars
- 1953: Stoke Potters

Team honours
- 1950, 1951: National League Division Two Champion
- 1951: National Trophy (Div 2)
- 1951: Southern Shield
- 1946: A.C.U. Cup (Div 2)

Horace Albert Burke (24 July 1912 – 29 January 1975), better known under the alias Paddy Mills, was a motorcycle speedway rider whose career spanned World War II.

== Career ==
Born Horace Burke in Leicester in 1913, he adopted the name Paddy Mills and began his career at Leicester in 1937, riding for the Hounds in the Provincial League. In 1938, he joined Sheffield, spending a season there before joining the Royal Air Force. He served in the RAF for six years, and was awarded the British Empire Medal. After the war, he joined the Norwich Stars, for whom he was the third highest points scorer in 1946, with 348 points in total. He went on to be the team's leading points scorer in both 1947 and 1948 and the club captain. He was picked to represent England in second test match in 1949, but suffered a fractured skull a few days before.

In 1952, Mills became president of the newly formed Leicester Amateur Speedway Club, which had a training track at Syston. In the late 1960s, Mills ran training sessions for the Long Eaton Archers.
