= Crystal Palace Glaziers =

British speedway team that existed from 1928 to 1939

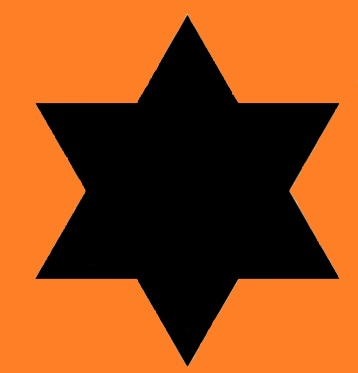

Club information
- Track address: Crystal Palace Exhibition Grounds; Sydenham; South London
- Country: England
- Founded: 1928
- Closed: 1939
- League: Southern League; National League

Major team honours
| London Cup | 1931 |

Crystal Palace Glaziers were a British speedway team that existed from 1928 to 1939.

== History ==
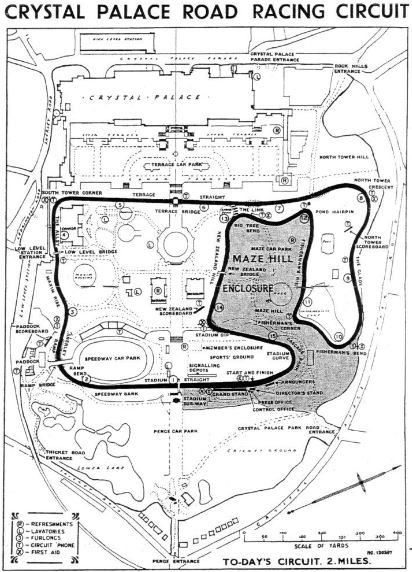
The speedway stadium is located on this pre-war map

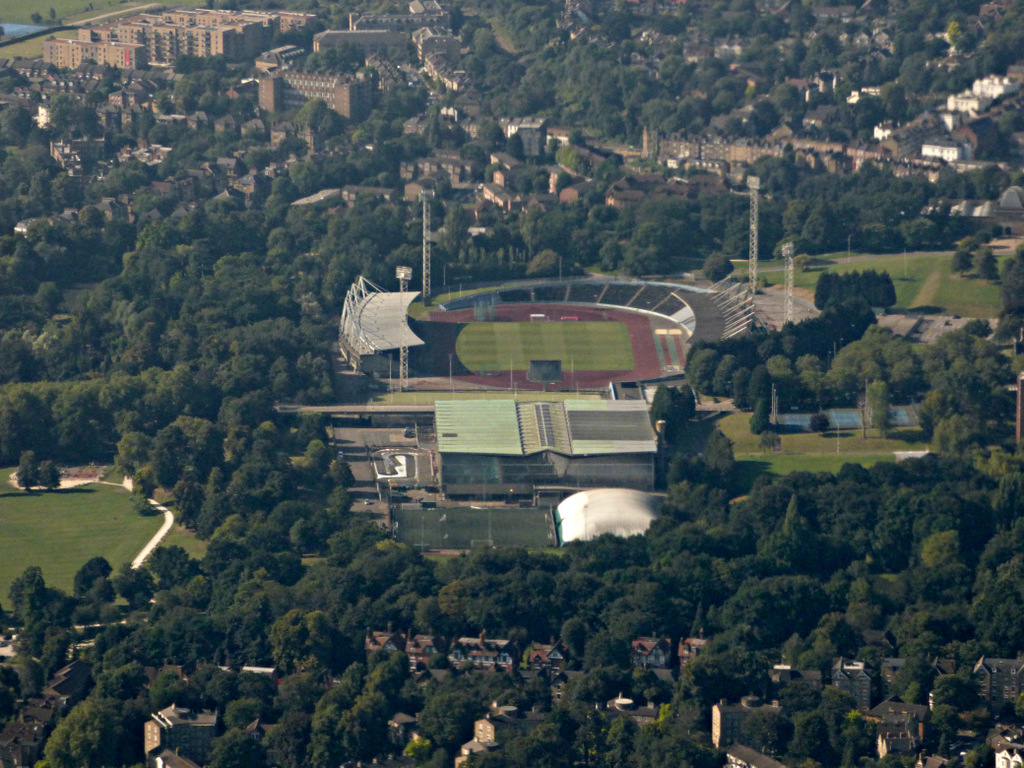
The national athletics stadium is the exact site of the former speedway circuit

Speedway at Crystal Palace was first held on 19 May 1928 during the pioneers days of the sport which had been brought over from Australia that year. The track was constructed around the former football pitch, which was located in the grounds of The Crystal Palace in Sydenham and was famous for hosting FA Cup finals. Organised by the London Motor Sports Ltd, speedway fixtures were held throughout 1928 at Crystal Palace before the Southern League and Northern Leagues were inaugurated the following year in 1929.

A team known as the Glaziers (because of the glass buildings) were formed and they competed in the 1929 Speedway Southern League, which was the first season consisting of a league system. The Glaziers star riders included Joe Francis and Triss Sharp and the first home fixture took place on 4 May 1929 against Wimbledon Dons.

The Glaziers continued to compete in the Southern League for the three seasons and won their first and only honours when winning the London Cup in 1931, beating Wembley Lions in the final. Other rider to become stars at the track were Roger Frogley, Ron Johnson, Nobby Key and Tom Farndon.

In 1932, the league changed its format, becoming the National League following the merger with the Northern league. The Glaziers performed well and finished as the league runner-up behind Wembley.

At the end of the 1933 season under the promotion of Fred Mockford, the entire team relocated to New Cross speedway, with the reason being that Mockford believed attendances would be larger.

Crystal Palace open meetings were staged at various times in subsequent years until the Glaziers returned for the 1939 Speedway National League Division Two. However the team withdrew mid-season and had their records expunged.

The last speedway meeting at Crystal Palace was on Sunday, 13 May 1940 but did not involve the Glaziers.

== Notable riders ==
- (England) Tom Farndon
- (England) Joe Francis
- (England) Roger Frogley
- (Australia) Ron Johnson
- (England) Nobby Key
- (England) George Newton
- (England) Triss Sharp
- (England) Harry Shepherd

== Season summary ==
| Year and league | Position | Notes |
|---|---|---|
| 1929 Speedway Southern League | 4th | |
| 1930 Speedway Southern League | 7th | |
| 1931 Speedway Southern League | 4th | London Cup winners |
| 1932 Speedway National League | 2nd | |
| 1933 Speedway National League | 4th | |
| 1939 Speedway National League | N/A | withdrew records expunged |

== See also ==
- Category:Crystal Palace Glaziers riders
