= Broncho Dixon =

English speedway rider

- Born: 17 October 1907; Darlington, England
- Died: 1986
- Nationality: British (English)

Career history
- 1929: Middlesbrough
- 1930–1931, 1939: Sheffield Blades
- 1932–1933: Belle Vue Aces
- 1934, 1936–1938: West Ham Hammers
- 1935: Wembley Lions
- 1936: Hackney Wick Wolves

Team honours
- 1933, 1937: National League
- 1933: National Trophy
- 1938: ACU Cup

John William Dixon (17 October 1907 – 1986) was an international motorcycle speedway rider who rode in the early days of speedway in the United Kingdom. He rode under the nickname Broncho Dixon.

== Career ==
Dixon rode for Middlesbrough during the inaugural season of speedway in the United Kingdom, in the 1929 Speedway English Dirt Track League and gained a reputation as a wild rider, which led to his nickname of Broncho; he would be involved in multiple crashes and lost the tops of two fingers.

Dixon spent the next two seasons with Sheffield. In 1932, he then switched to Belle Vue Aces, after the formation of the National League. He was still a member of the Manchester-based team when they won the league and cup double during the 1933 Speedway National League.

Dixon went on to ride for West Ham Hammers, Wembley Lions and Hackney Wick Wolves until his last season in 1939. He won a second league title with West Ham in 1937 and the A.C.U Cup in 1938.

== Players cigarette cards ==
Dixon is listed as number 12 of 50 in the 1930s Player's cigarette card collection.
