= Wal Morton =

British motorcycle speedway rider

- Born: 17 January 1911; Birmingham, England
- Died: 21 April 1995 (aged 84)
- Nationality: British (English)

Career history
- 1933: Coventry Bees
- 1933–1935, 1952: West Ham Hammers
- 1935–1937, 1949, 1951: Wimbledon Dons
- 1936: Bristol Bulldogs
- 1937–1939, 1948, 1957: Norwich Stars
- 1946: Glasgow Tigers
- 1947–1949: Harringay Racers
- 1951: Newcastle Diamonds
- 1953–1954: Bradford Tudors
- 1957, 1959: Ipswich Witches
- 1960: Liverpool Pirates
- 1961: Middlesbrough Bears
- 1962: Bradford Panthers
- 1963: Hackney Hawks

Individual honours
- 1936: Western Australian State Champion

Team honours
- 1938: Provincial Trophy
- 1948: Anniversary Cup

Walter Neville Morton (17 January 1911 – 21 April 1995) was a motorcycle speedway rider from England and rode in British speedway for a remarkable 31 years from 1933 to 1963.

== Biography ==
Morton, born in Birmingham, worked in the Austin Motor Works and was an amateur boxer. Upon taking up speedway, he was a product of the Brandon Speedway Riders' Club, which provided riders for the Coventry Bees. He began his British leagues career riding for West Ham Hammers, during the 1933 Speedway National League season.

Following the 1934 season with West Ham, Morton switched to Wimbledon Dons for 1935, in an exchange with Arthur Warwick. During the 1935/36 winter break, he travelled to Australia and won the Western Australian Individual Speedway Championship at the Claremont Speedway.

Half of the 1936 season was spent with Bristol Bulldogs before Morton was recalled by Wimbledon and the following season in 1937, he made his debut for Norwich Stars. He remained with Norwich until the outbreak of World War II and was a league and National Trophy double winner with them in 1938.

After the war, Morton joined Glasgow Tigers, where he captained a Scottish national team in representative matches (riders participating in Scotland were eligible). He then joined Harringay Racers, where he won the 1948 Anniversary Cup. In 1949, Southampton Saints and Newcastle Diamonds unsuccessfully attempted to sign him from Harringay after he was placed on the transfer list for a fee of £250. He eventually rejoined Wimbledon but decided to go to Ireland to race during 1950.

Newcastle finally managed to agree a deal with Morton for 1951 and he rode for West Ham again in 1952. Morton was now racing in his forties but continued to perform at a reasonable level in the reserve berth of teams. Two seasons at Bradford Tudors from 1953 to 1954, were followed by a rest from speedway for two years, although he did take part in some grasstrack meetings.

Morton returned to speedway in 1957, riding for Norwich and then Ipswich Witches. He also rode a few times for the latter in 1959 and 1960 before finishing the 1960 season with Liverpool Pirates.

Despite turning 50 in January 1961, Morton rode three more seasons from 1961 until 1963 for Middlesbrough, Bradford and Hackney respectively.
