= Stan Williams (speedway rider) =

- Born: 13 May 1916; Narborough, Leicestershire, England
- Died: 2002 (aged 85); Stockport, England
- Nationality: British (English)

Career history
- 1938–1939, 1946–1949: Sheffield Tars
- 1950–1953: Coventry Bees

Team honours
- 1947: British Speedway Cup (Div 2)
- 1952: Midland Cup
- 1953: National League Div 2 Champion

Stanley Thomas Henry Williams (13 May 1916 – 2002) was a British motorcycle speedway rider for Sheffield and Coventry.

== Career ==
Born in Blaby, Leicestershire in June 1917, Williams started grasstrack racing at the age of seventeen, pushing his bike the eighteen miles from Leicester to Nottingham to take part in his first race. His first speedway experience was from practice sessions at the Leicester Super stadium, later practising at Dagenham. He was signed by Sheffield in 1938, suffering mechanical problems in his first season that saw him close to giving up, but he developed greatly the following year, working under Bluey Wilkinson, including beating Lionel Van Praag in a race at Harringay and reaching the semi-final of the World Championship.

After serving in the Royal Air Force during World War II, Williams returned to Sheffield as team captain in 1946, leading the team to a second-place finish in the Northern League. A broken ankle in 1946 and a broken wrist in 1947 limited his racing, and he spent much of his time tutoring his younger brother Len, who broke into the Sheffield team in 1947.

Williams stayed with Sheffield until the end of the 1949 season, moving on to Coventry Bees at the start of 1950. He spent four seasons with Coventry, being made captain in 1952 and then retiring in 1953. He later returned to Coventry as team manager. In the 1960s he managed Newport Wasps.
