= Sheffield Tigers =

British motorcycle speedway team

Club information
- Track address: Owlerton Stadium; Penistone Road; Sheffield; South Yorkshire
- Country: England
- Founded: 1929
- Promoter: Damien Bates, Julie Reading & Peter Mole
- Team manager: Simon Stead
- League: SGB Premiership; National Development League
- Website: www.sheffield-speedway.com

Club facts
- Colours: Yellow and Blue
- Track size: 361 metres (395 yd)
- Track record time: 58.92 seconds (57.86 mph / 84 ft per second)
- Track record date: 30 May 2024
- Track record holder: Jack Holder

Current team
Rider	CMA
(Australia) Jack Holder
(England) Leon Flint
(England) Anders Rowe
(Australia) Chris Holder
(Australia) Josh Pickering
(Australia) Jye Etheridge
(Australia) Luke Killeen

Major team honours
United Kingdom Champions	2023
Div 1 Knockout Cup	1974, 2024
Div 1 League Cup	2022
Div 2 Champions	1999, 2002, 2017
Division 2 Knockout Cup	1939, 2002
Div 2 Pairs Champions	2010, 2017, 2018
Div 2 Fours Champions	1999, 2000
Premier Trophy Winners	2001
Div 2 British Speedway Cup	1947
Div 3 Champions	2000, 2001, 2011
Northern Trophy	1974, 1979
Provincial Northern League	1962, 1963, 1964

The Sheffield Tigers (sponsored by Tru Plant) are a motorcycle speedway team based in Sheffield, England. They currently race in the British SGB Premiership, and their home meetings take place at Owlerton Stadium. They were founded in 1929 and were champions of Britain, in 2023.

The Tigers traditionally hold their race nights on Thursdays between March and October.

== History ==
=== Origins & 1930s ===
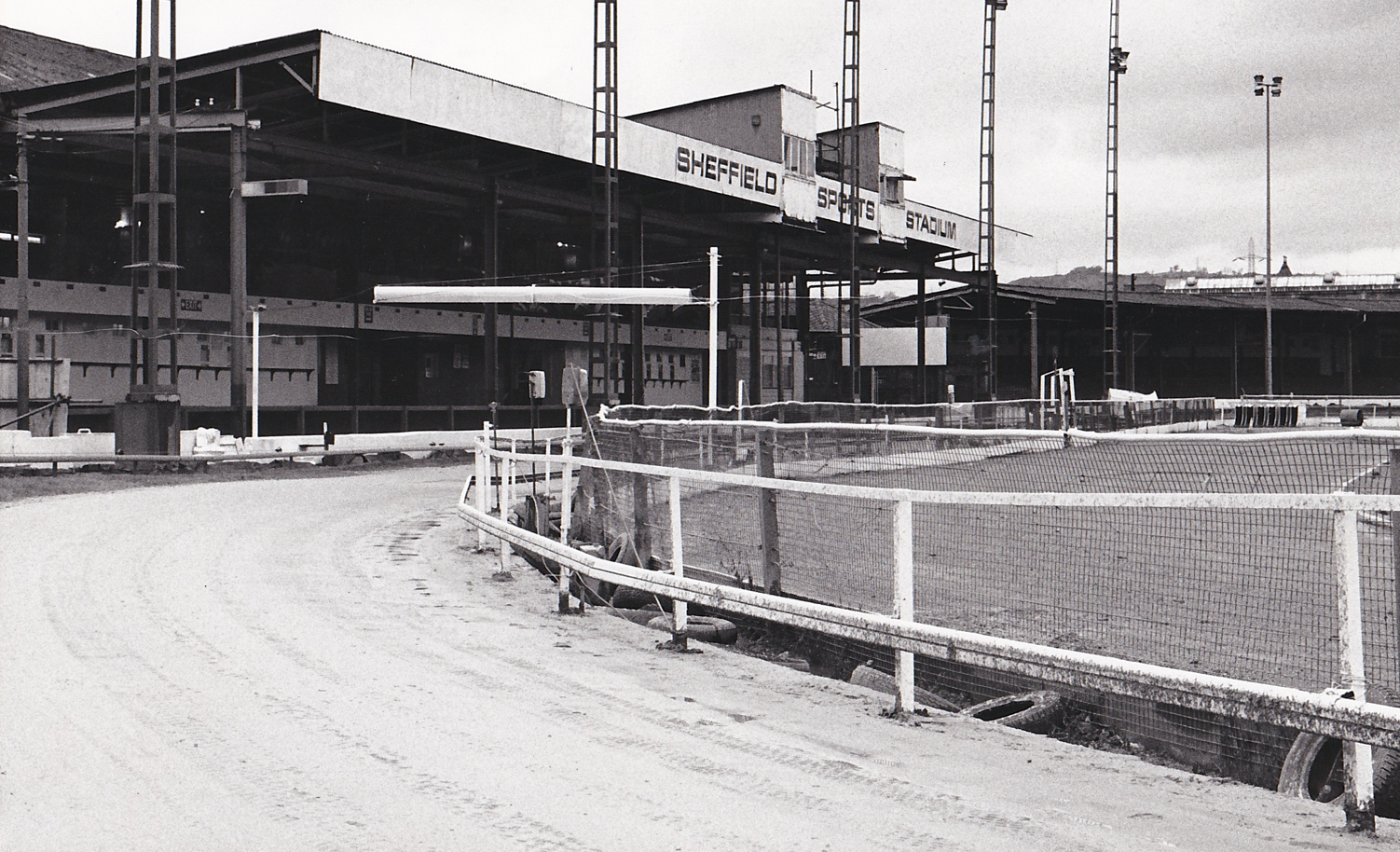
Owlerton opened in 1929.

In 1929 construction began on a 20-acre freehold site to build a new stadium in Owlerton. The Provincial Dirt Tracks (Sheffield) Co. Ltd under the chairmanship of Edgar W. Hart opened the purpose-built Owlerton Stadium on 30 March 1929. The team known simply as Sheffield at the time were inaugural members of the English Dirt Track League and Northern League the following season. In 1930, they rode as the Sheffield Blades but soon adopted the name Tigers. The early stars of the team included Dusty Haigh, Clem Beckett, Broncho Dixon and Squib Burton.

=== 1940s ===
The team re-opened for a short spell in 1945, following the disruption caused by World War II before returning to league action in 1946. The team operated in the Northern League of 1946 and in the National League Division Two between 1947 and 1950. The team spearheaded by Stan Williams and Tommy Bateman won their first trophy in 1947, after winning the British Speedway Cup (Div 2).

=== 1950s ===
The 1950s started with the unpopular decision to name the team the Tars and matters got worse despite the team reverting to the name Tigers at the end of the 1950 season because the team withdrew from the league part way through 1951.

=== 1960s ===
The track re-opened in 1960, with the Tigers participating in the Provincial League. The team continued to ride in the Provincial League until 1964, when they moved up to the highest tier, known as the National League at the time before it was renamed the British League in 1965. The sixties brought little success with the best performances being a fourth place finish in 1960, 1963 and 1968. Notable riders during the decade were Clive Featherby, Jack Kitchen, John Dews, Billy Bales, Arnold Haley and Bob Paulson.

=== 1970s ===
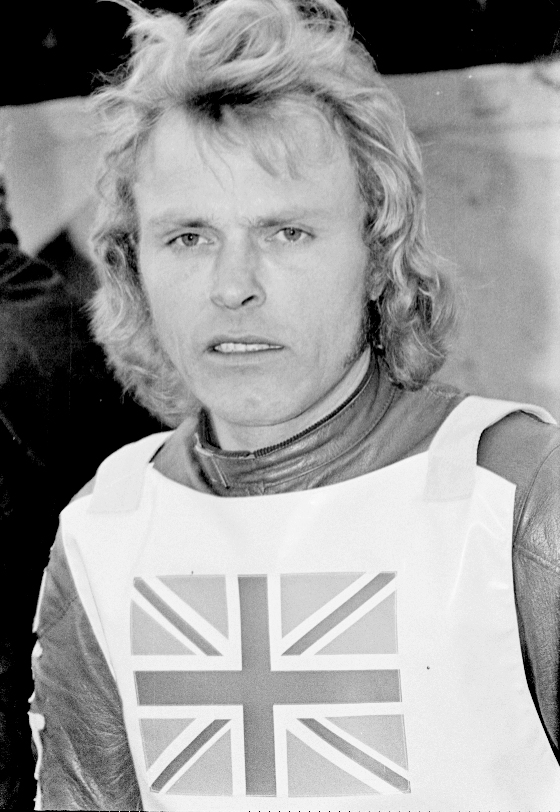
Reg Wilson made a club record 470 appearances from 1970 to 1986

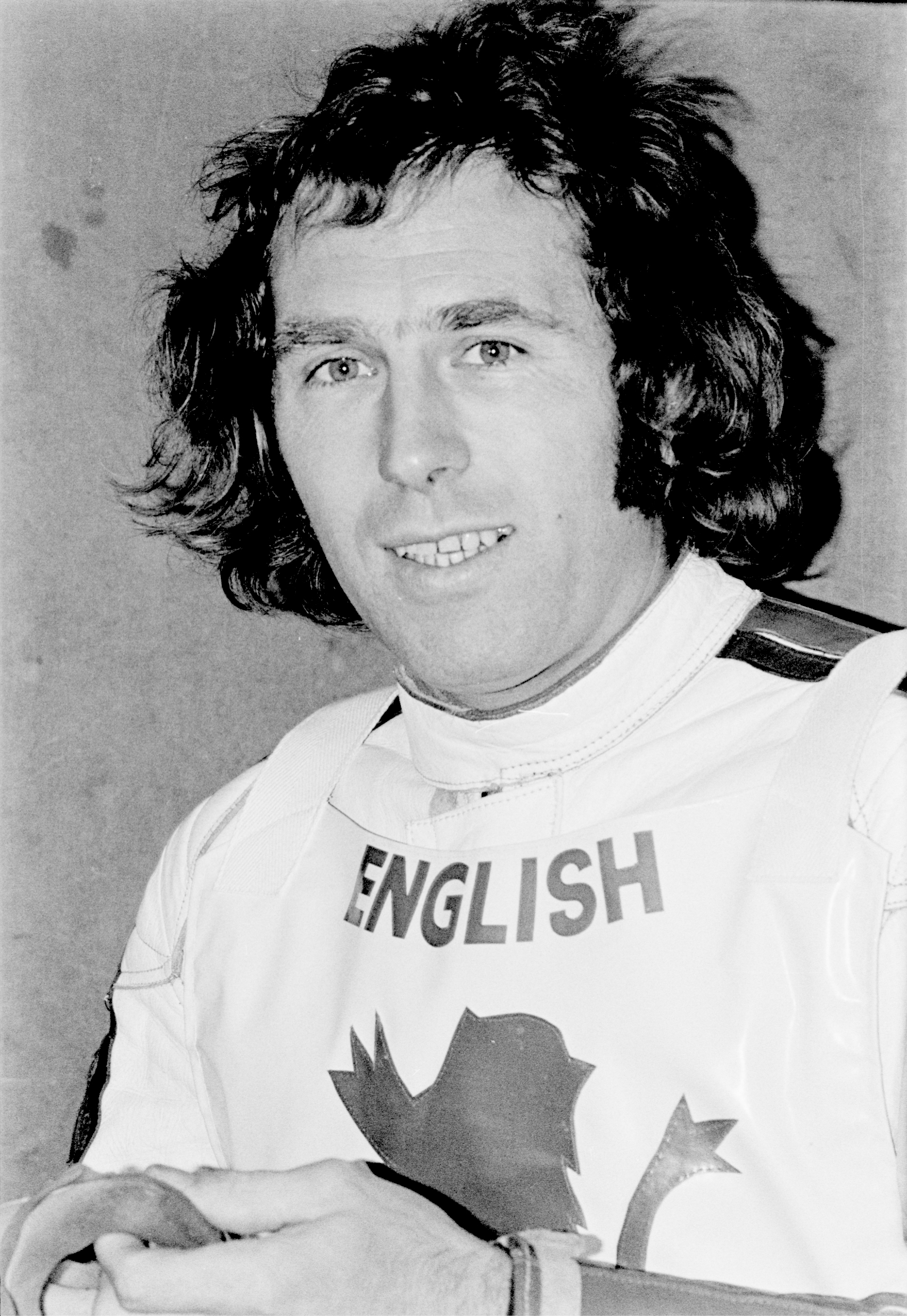
Doug Wyer, Sheffield's leading rider in the 1970s.

Sheffield had signed Jim Airey the Australian champion in 1969 and he led Sheffield into the seventies. In 1970, he finished third in the league averages and then steered Sheffield to a fourth place finish in 1971, when well supported by Haley and Bengt Larsson.

Despite the loss of Airey for 1972, the team rode well finishing fourth again before taking runner-up spot in 1973. Silverware finally arrived in 1974 when the Tigers won the Knockout Cup, easily defeating Ipswich Witches in the final. Bob Valentine recorded 22 points over the two legs and with heavy scoring from Haley and Doug Wyer, the Tigers won by a 25 point margin.

By the mid-seventies Reg Wilson was becoming an important rider for the club, topping the team's averages in 1975 and 1979 and establishing himself as one of two main riders alongside Doug Wyer.

=== 1980s ===
The eighties started badly with a last place finish in 1980, but in 1981 the club signed American rising star Shawn Moran. He would spend eight seasons at Owlerton, developing into a world class rider and a fan's favourite.

In 1984, the Collins brothers Neil and Les arrived and in 1985, Peter Carr was signed, with the team only being denied the league title by the big spending Oxford Cheetahs. The following season, Reg Wilson retired after making a club record 470 appearances and Shawn Moran's older brother Kelly Moran was signed. Sheffield enjoyed large attendances throughout the 1980s but after the 1988 season, the landlords increased the rent and manager Eric Boocock was forced to disband the team and sell the riders.

=== 1990s ===
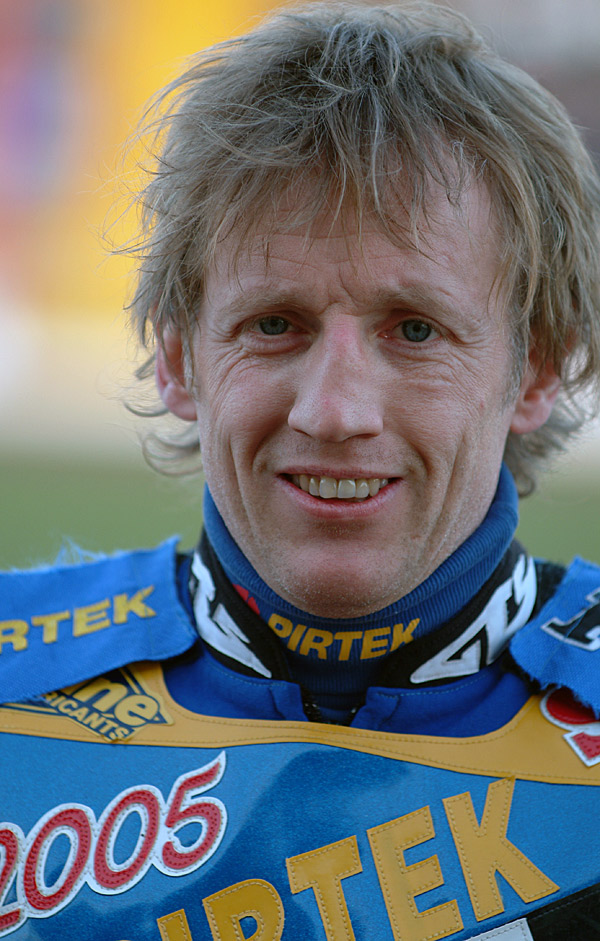
Sean Wilson helped the Tigers win their first league title.

Division 2 speedway returned to Owlerton in 1991 under the promotion of Cliff Carr and following the signing of a lease with the city council. Neil Evitts was number 1 before being replaced by Roman Matoušek, although it was not until 1999 that Sheffield experienced the taste of success again.

Inspired by Sean Wilson, Sheffield won the Premier League (speedway's second division) during the 1999 Premier League speedway season.

=== 2000s ===
The club's junior side the Sheffield Prowlers won more silverware, winning the Conference League in 2000 and 2001 and the Tigers won the league and Knockout Cup in 2002 to complete the double, during the 2002 Premier League speedway season. Sean Wilson and Simon Stead both had great seasons and when Sean Wilson would retire in 2005, he was the Tigers all-time leading point scorer, with 4246 points.

The Tigers later recorded a second place finish in 2006 and a play off final appearance in 2007.

=== 2010s ===
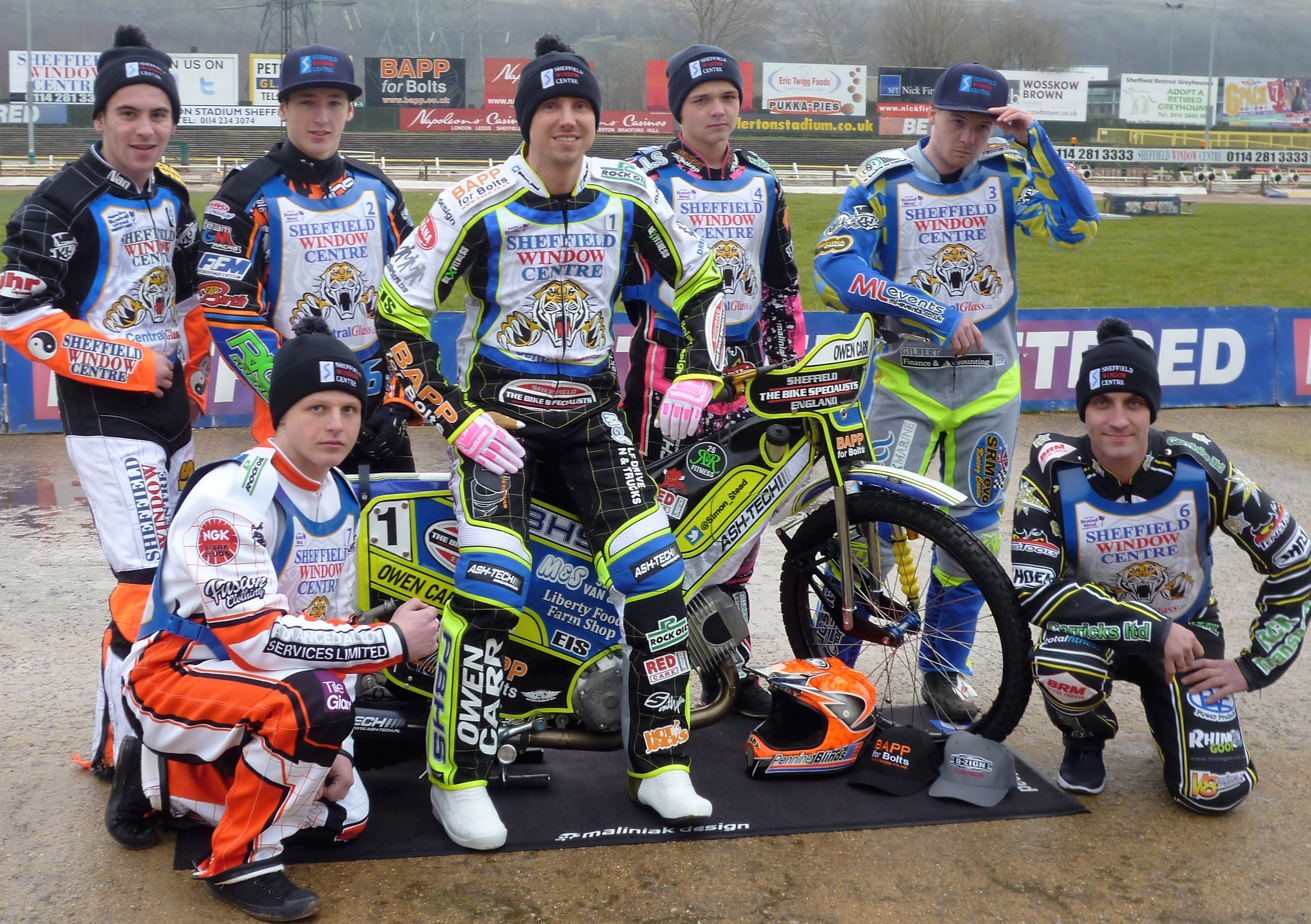
Sheffield Tigers 2016

The Tigers reached another play off final during the 2010 Premier League speedway season, the same season that Ricky Ashworth and Josh Auty won the pairs championship.

The SGB Championship 2017 season was the 21st consecutive season that the Sheffield Tigers competed in division 2. The Tigers finished in 1st place having beaten Ipswich Witches in the two leg play off final 99–81. Josh Grajczonek headed the team averages, supported by Kyle Howarth and Lasse Bjerre, the latter two also winning the championship pairs.

=== 2020s ===
Following a season lost to the COVID-19 pandemic the team stepped up to the highest division for the first time since the 1995/1996 merged division. Jack Holder and Adam Ellis were signed, with the team finishing 4th but following the signing of Tobiasz Musielak the club topped the SGB Premiership 2022 table but controversially lost in the play off final to Belle Vue Aces, which foiled the chance for the club to win their first ever top-tier league title. However, they did gain compensation by winning the League Cup.

In 2023, the Tigers signed two former world champions in Tai Woffinden and Chris Holder and after finishing third in the SGB Premiership 2023 league standings, they went on to defeat Wolverhampton Wolves in the semi finals and then Ipswich Witches in the final. This was the first time in the club's history that were crowned champions of the United Kingdom. The success somewhat atoned for the final defeat the season before.

A track record that had stood for 4976 days (from 15 October 2010) was beaten on 30 May 2024. Ricky Ashworth's time of 59.1 seconds was bettered by Jack Holder, with a time of 58.92 seconds. Sheffield's success continued in 2024 with the club winning the Knockout Cup and the Tigers finished top of the regular season table in both 2024 and 2025 but were eliminated in the play of semi-finals.

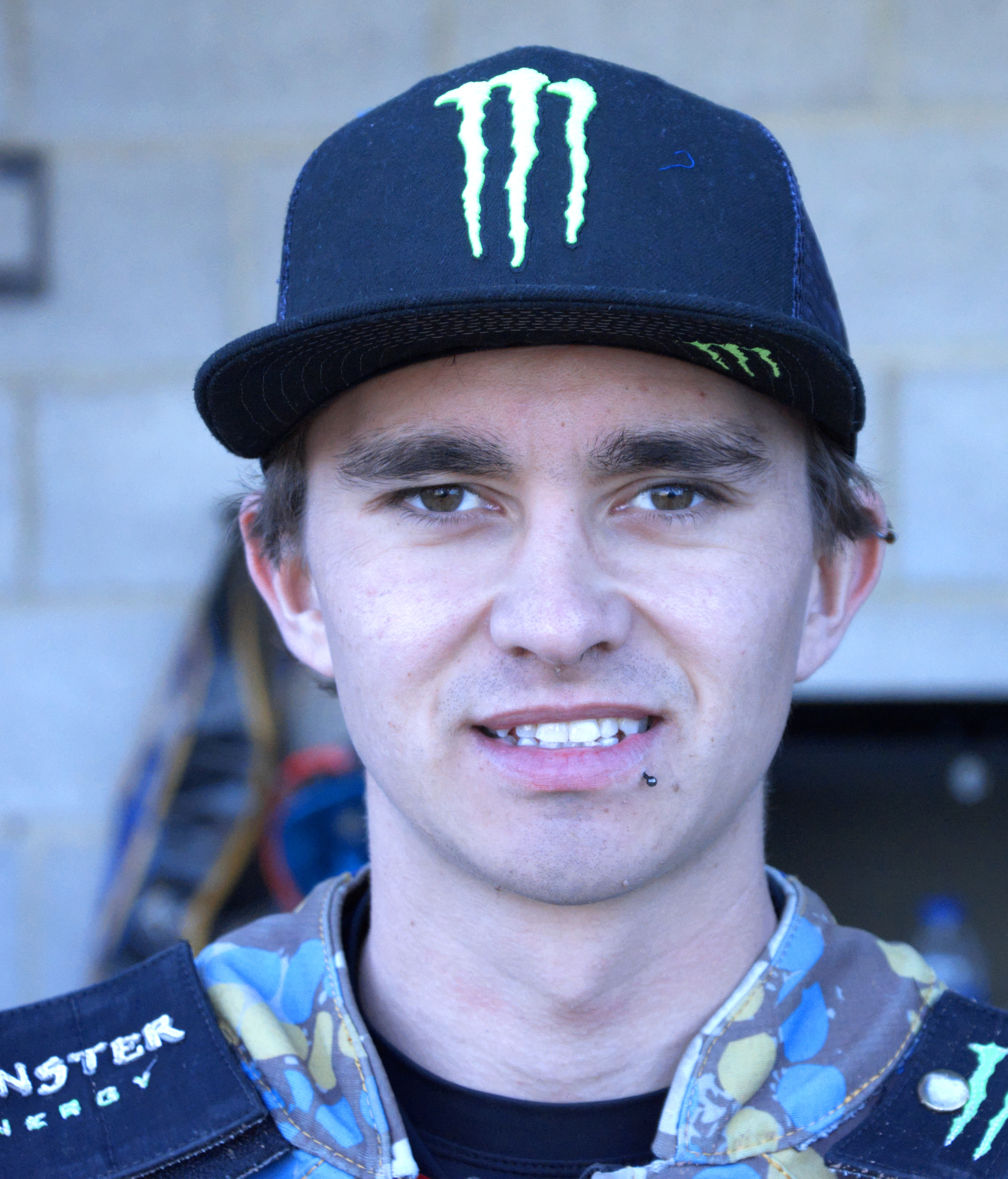
Jack Holder

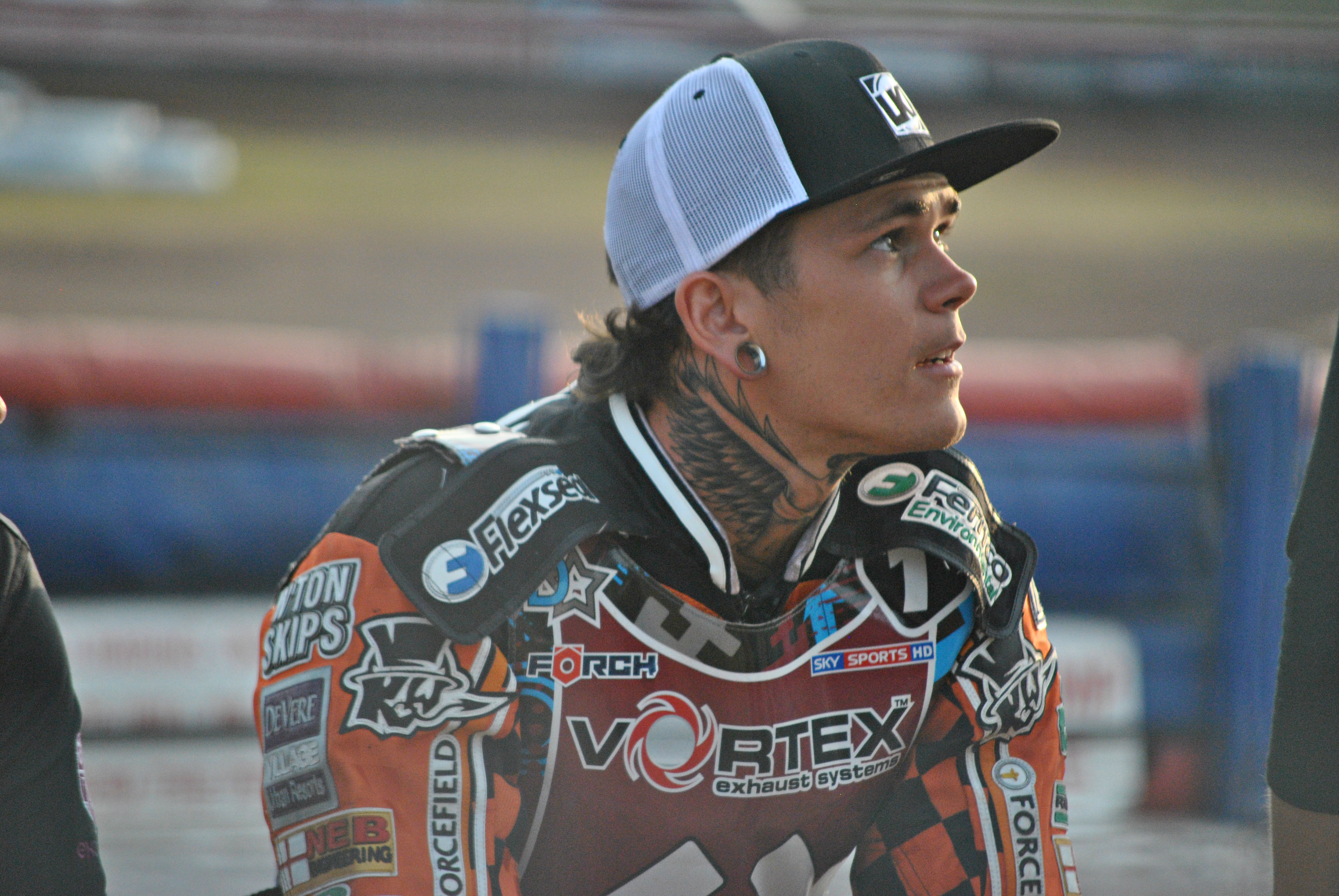
Tai Woffinden

== Club honours ==
- SGB Premiership winners 2023
- SGB Premiership Knockout Cup winners 2024
- British Championship League SGB Championship winners 2017
- British Championship Pairs SGB Championship winners 2017, 2018
- British Speedway Cup (Division 2) – 1947
- British League Knockout Cup winners – 1974
- Premier League Four-Team Championship winners – 1999, 2000
- Premier League Play off winners – 1999, 2002
- Premier League winners - 1999, 2002
- Conference League Champions - 2000, 2001
- Premier Trophy winners - 2001
- Premier League Riders Championship winners -1996, 1999, 2003, 2004, 2005, 2009, 2014, 2016
- Premier League Pairs winners – 2010

== Full seasons summary ==
Extended content

Year and league	Table position	Notes
1929 Speedway English Dirt Track League	9th	
1930 Speedway Northern League	7th	as the Blades
1931 Speedway Northern League	3rd	
1933 Speedway National League	8th	
1938 Speedway National League Division Two	7th	
1939 Speedway National League	3rd+	+when season was suspended
1946 Speedway Northern League	2nd	
1947 Speedway National League Division Two	2nd	British Cup Div 2 winners
1948 Speedway National League Division Two	4th	
1949 Speedway National League Division Two	2nd	
1950 Speedway National League Division Two	10th	as the Tars
1951 Speedway National League Division Two	N/A	withdrew, results expunged
1960 Provincial Speedway League	4th	
1961 Provincial Speedway League	7th	
1962 Provincial Speedway League	7th	
1963 Provincial Speedway League	4th	
1964 Speedway National League	8th	
1965 British League season	11th	
1966 British League season	11th	
1967 British League season	9th	
1968 British League season	4th	
1969 British League season	6th	
1970 British League season	7th	
1971 British League season	4th	
1972 British League season	4th	
1973 British League season	2nd	
1974 British League season	4th	Knockout Cup winners
1975 British League season	5th	
1976 British League season	17th	
1977 British League season	13th	
1978 British League season	8th	
1979 British League season	13th	
1980 British League season	17th	
1981 British League season	10th	
1982 British League season	5th	
1983 British League season	10th	
1984 British League season	5th	
1985 British League season	2nd	
1986 British League season	4th	
1987 British League season	4th	
1988 British League season	6th	
1991 British League Division Two season	5th	
1992 British League Division Two season	10th	
1993 British League Division Two season	9th	
1994 British League Division Two season	9th	
1995 Premier League speedway season	14th	
1996 Premier League speedway season	18th	
1997 Premier League speedway season	10th	
1998 Premier League speedway season	5th	
1999 Premier League speedway season	1st	champions
2000 Premier League speedway season	4th	
2001 Premier League speedway season	3rd	
2002 Premier League speedway season	1st	champions & Knockout Cup winners
2003 Premier League speedway season	2nd	
2004 Premier League speedway season	8th	
2005 Premier League speedway season	3rd	
2006 Premier League speedway season	2nd	
2007 Premier League speedway season	4th	PO final
2008 Premier League speedway season	8th	
2009 Premier League speedway season	9th	
2010 Premier League speedway season	4th	PO final & Premier League Pairs
2011 Premier League speedway season	2nd	
2012 Premier League speedway season	12th	
2013 Premier League speedway season	12th	
2014 Premier League speedway season	12th	
2015 Premier League speedway season	5th	
2016 Premier League speedway season	6th	PO final
SGB Championship 2017	1st	champions
SGB Championship 2018	11th	
SGB Championship 2019	6th	
SGB Premiership 2021	4th	PO semi final
SGB Premiership 2022	2nd	PO finalist, League Cup winners
SGB Premiership 2023	3rd	Champions
SGB Premiership 2024	1st*	*PO semi final, KO Cup winners
SGB Premiership 2025	1st*	*PO semi final

== Season summary (juniors) ==
Extended content

Year and league	Position	Notes
1996 Speedway Conference League	10th	Owlerton Prowlers
2000 Speedway Conference League	1st	Prowlers, Champions
2001 Speedway Conference League	1st	Prowlers, Champions
2002 Speedway Conference League	2nd	Prowlers
2003 Speedway Conference League	8th	Prowlers
2011 National League speedway season	1st	as Scunthorpe & Sheffield Saints, Champions
2024 National Development League speedway season	5th	as Scunthorpe/Sheffield
2025 National Development League and National Trophy speedway season	4th	as Scunthorpe/Sheffield

== Notable riders ==
- (Australia) Jim Airey
- (England) Tommy Allott
- (England) Ricky Ashworth
- (England) Josh Auty
- (England) Billy Bales
- (England) Tommy Bateman
- (England) Clem Beckett
- (England) Squib Burton
- (England) Peter Carr
- (England) Les Collins
- (England) Neil Collins
- (England) Andre Compton
- (England) John Dews
- (England) Broncho Dixon
- (England) Neil Evitts
- (England) Clive Featherby
- (England) Dusty Haigh
- (England) Arnold Haley
- (Australia) Jack Holder
- (Australia) Chris Holder
- (Germany) Robbie Kessler
- (England) Jack Kitchen
- (Sweden) Bengt Larsson
- (Czech Republic) Roman Matoušek
- (United States) Kelly Moran
- (United States) Shawn Moran
- (England) Bob Paulson
- (England) Bruce Semmens
- (England) Simon Stead
- (Australia) Bob Valentine
- (England) Len Williams
- (England) Stan Williams
- (England) Reg Wilson
- (England) Sean Wilson
- (England) Tai Woffinden
- (England) Doug Wyer
