= Jeff Lloyd =

British motorcycle speedway rider

- Born: 29 July 1914; Birmingham, England
- Died: 24 June 1997 (aged 82)
- Nationality: British (English)

Career history
- 1938: Birmingham Bulldogs
- 1939: Bristol Bulldogs
- 1946–1947: Newcastle Diamonds
- 1947–1950: New Cross Rangers
- 1950–1954: Harringay Racers

Individual honours
- 1947: Tom Farndon Memorial winner

Team honours
- 1948: National League Champion
- 1952: National Trophy winner
- 1947, 1952, 1953: London Cup winner
- 1953: Coronation Cup winner

Alfred Jeffrey Lloyd (29 July 1914 – 24 June 1997) was a former international speedway rider who qualified for the Speedway World Championship finals three times. He earned five international caps for the England national speedway team.

== Career ==
Lloyd took up speedway in 1936, first riding at Wembley before gaining further experience at Birmingham, before signing with Bristol Bulldogs. When speedway resumed in 1945 he returned, and was one of the top riders in the Northern League in 1946. He joined the Newcastle Diamonds in 1946, and finished the season averaging over ten points per match in the Northern League.

In 1947, it was expected that Lloyd would be signed by a higher division team but he started the season with the Diamonds. A few weeks into the season, the New Cross Rangers signed Lloyd for a transfer fee of £1,000 (at the time the highest transfer fee in British speedway), with Ken Le Breton transferring in the opposite direction.

By then end of the next season, Lloyd had won the National League championship and was performing well for New Cross for several years.

Lloyd was selected to represent England in the test series against Australia in the 1948 Ashes series.

1950 saw Lloyd start the season with the Rangers but midway through the season he was transferred to the Harringay Racers, a move that was not popular with the New Cross fans. Whilst with the Racers, he qualified for the Speedway World Championship final three times and was a member of the team that won the National Trophy in 1952.

When the Racers closed down at the end of 1954, Lloyd retired.

== Family ==
Lloyd's two brothers Wally and Johnny were both professional speedway riders.

== World final appearances ==
- 1951 – (England) London, Wembley Stadium: 11th (6 pts)
- 1952 – (England) London, Wembley Stadium: 8th (7 pts)
- 1953 – (England) London, Wembley Stadium: 7th (8 pts)
