= Tommy Allott =

British motorcycle speedway rider (1908–1975)

- Born: 15 May 1908; Denby Dale, England
- Died: 1 May 1975 (aged 66)
- Nationality: British (English)

Career history
- 1929: Barnsley
- 1931–1932, 1938, 1946–1949, 1950–1951: Sheffield Tigers/Tars
- 1932–1934: West Ham Hammers
- 1935–1936, 1939: Belle Vue Aces
- 1936, 1951–1953: Liverpool Chads
- 1936–1937: Nottingham Wasps
- 1939: Norwich Stars
- 1939: Stoke Potters
- 1950: Edinburgh Monarchs

Team honours
- 1935, 1936: National League Champion
- 1937: Provincial Trophy
- 1937: Provincial League Coronation Cup
- 1947: British Speedway Cup (Div 2)

Tommy Allott (15 May 1908 – 1 May 1975) was a motorcycle speedway rider who rode from the sport's earliest days in Britain until the 1950s.

== Career ==
Allott was born in Denby Dale in 1908. He rode for Barnsley in 1929, joining Sheffield in 1931 and then the West Ham Hammers in 1932, but retired after being seriously injured in a crash while racing that year at West Ham. With a metal plate in his left arm, he made a comeback in 1935, riding as a reserve for the Belle Vue Aces, also riding that season in the Provincial League for Bristol and Nottingham. Struggling to regain his confidence, in 1938 he moved on to the Norwich Stars before joining Sheffield Tigers the following year. During World War II, Allott worked for Rolls-Royce. When speedway returned after World War II, Rolls-Royce gave him leave of absence to compete again in speedway and he rejoined Sheffield, his racing making him one of the top riders in the Northern League, including a run of 27 consecutive heat wins. In 1946, he reached the final of the British Riders' Championship.

Allott stayed at Sheffield until 1949, joining Edinburgh Monarchs in 1950, but transferring back to Sheffield later that year. He moved to the Liverpool Chads for his final three seasons before retiring in 1953.

Allott rode in several international matches, representing the Provincial League against Australia in 1937, England against the Dominion in 1938, and for Britain against the Overseas in 1950 and 1951.

Allott died in May 1975.

== Family ==
Allott's brother Guy, nephew Nicky and, great-nephew Adam Allott also became speedway riders.
