= Maurice Stobbart =

English speedway rider (1915–2001)

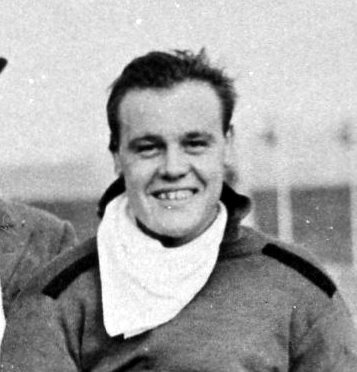
- Born: 22 December 1915; Aspatria, England
- Died: 27 February 2001 (aged 85)
- Nationality: British (English)

Career history
- 1931: York
- 1932: Preston
- 1933: Wembley Lions
- 1937: Workington
- 1938-1939, 1948: Newcastle Diamonds
- 1949: Ashfield Giants

Maurice Stobbart (22 December 1915 – 27 February 2001) was an English motorcycle speedway rider and promoter. He was the younger brother to Roland Stobbart.

== Biography ==
Observers generally regard Maurice Stobbart as a pre- and post-war northern-based speedway rider. Stobbart began speedway racing at Workington in 1931; he was sixteen years of age. He demonstrated his ability in the very first event, when while taking a bend, he struck a post, burst his rear tyre but skilfully retained his balance. Although he often came to grief, he showed tremendous promise and signed for York during that season. Returning to Workington in 1937, he equalled his brother’s long standing course and lap record on two occasions. He also won several Golden Helmets, Golden Sashes, Challenge Matches and Derwent Handicaps.

Stobbart moved to Preston at the start of the 1932 season and then rode for the Wembley Lions in the 1933 season.

Although Stobbart retired at the end of that season through a lack of success, Roland coaxed him back into the sport in 1937 when he began promoting events at Workington, Carlisle and Ayr. In 1938-39 he rode for Newcastle Diamonds. In his very first race, Stobbart broke the Newcastle track record by five seconds, a record that had stood since 1930. He entered six events that evening, he had four firsts, one second, and in the event not mentioned, he was leading when engine trouble robbed him of victory. Victories which earned him the opportunity to enter the qualifying round of the world Speedway championships.

In 1939, he replaced his brother Rol in the England team for a test match against the Dominions. Stobbart served with the Royal Air Force during World War II and returned to race Newcastle after his service.

== Bibliography ==
- Ron Hoare (1979). Speedway Panorama. London: Haynes.
