= George Greenwood (speedway rider) =

British speedway rider

- Born: 28 October 1911; Baildon, West Yorkshire, England
- Died: Q4, 1988 (aged 77); Lambeth, London
- Nationality: British (English)

Career history
- 1929: Halifax
- 1929, 1938: Leeds Lions
- 1930–1932, 1934, 1936–1937: Wembley Lions
- 1933, 1936–1938: Nottingham Wasps
- 1936: Cardiff White City
- 1937: Hackney Wick Wolves
- 1939: Edinburgh Thistles
- 1939: Middlesbrough Bears

Individual honours
- 1936: Provincial League; Riders' champion
- 1936: Leading average

Team honours
- 1929: English Dirt Track League Champion
- 1930, 1931: Southern League Champion
- 1932: National League Champion
- 1930, 1932: London Cup Winner
- 1931, 1932: National Trophy Winner
- 1937: Provincial Trophy
- 1937: Provincial League Coronation Cup

George Greenwood (28 October 1911 – Q4 1988) was an international motorcycle speedway rider from England.

== Speedway career ==
In 1929, Greenwood was the Leeds track champion at the age of 17, and soon became a major star around the Northern tracks. His form soon attracted the attention of Wembley Lions, who signed him in 1929, for the 1930 season. He was one of the first riders recognised as developing team riding (where both riders attempt to hold the front of the race together), forming a successful partnership with Harry Whitfield.

In 1930, Greenwood was selected for Great British team to tour New Zealand. It was the first team to leave the shores and consisted of Greenwood, Whitfield, Jim Kempster, Roger Frogley, Frank Bond and Squib Burton. He was later the captain of the Nottingham team and became the 1936 Provincial League Riders' champion and topped the averages during the 1936 Provincial Speedway League.

At retirement, Greenwood had earned two international caps for the England national speedway team.

== Personal life ==
Greenwood married Ivy Elliston in 1937 and after World War II, he managed a motor export shop (owned by Wembley speedway manager Alec Jackson) in Harrow Road, Kensal Green, London and was also part of the Wembley Lions management team.

== Players cigarette cards ==
Greenwood is listed as number 16 of 50 in the 1930s Player's cigarette card collection.
