= Nottingham (speedway) =

Defunct British speedway team

Club information
- Track address: White City Stadium; Trent Lane; Nottingham
- Country: England
- Founded: 1930
- Closed: 1938
- League: Southern League; National League; Provincial League

Club facts
- Track size: 440 yards (400 m) (1929–31); 412 yards (377 m) (1933–34); 380 yards (350 m) (1936–38)

Major team honours
Provincial League Trophy winners	1937
Provincial League Coronation Cup winners	1937

The Nottingham speedway team competed in the 1930s, with a home track on Trent Lane, Nottingham at the White City Stadium, originally called the Olympic Sports Ground.

== History ==
The track was first used on 28 July 1928, when the Nottingham Tornado Motorcycle Club put in a grass track but plans for greyhound racing had been discussed in early 1927 and the Greyhound Racing Association (GRA) ensured that they had a financial interest in the stadium.

In 1929, a dirt track was laid down by the Olympic Speedway Ltd over the grass track and the stadium was known as the Olympic Grounds and open matches were held. A Nottingham team competed in the Southern League in 1930 and 1931 but finished last in the league table on both occasions. During the 1931 season the team had completed 20 fixtures before they withdrew form the league.

In 1933, White City (Nottingham) Ltd constructed a new stadium known as the White City Stadium which included three new grandstands, a new greyhound track and speedway circuit, replacing the original Olympic Grounds. The speedway team returned, competing in the National League but finished last once again and did not return for the 1934 season.

The team returned to the league in 1936, competing in the second tier called the Provincial League finishing third. The following season was the most successful as they won both the Provincial League Trophy and Coronation Cup and finished third in the league.

In 1938 the Provincial League became the National League Division Two; Nottingham started the season but withdrew after the final meeting to be held at Nottingham on 31 May 1938, with Leeds taking over the team's remaining fixtures.

The team were nicknamed 'The Lacemen', and also briefly the 'Wasps'.

== Notable riders ==
- Charlie Blacklock
- George Greenwood
- Nobby Key
- Billy Lamont
- Cliff Parkinson
- Tommy Price
- Fred Strecker

== Season summary ==
Year and league	Position	Notes
1930 Speedway Southern League	13th	
1931 Speedway Southern League	11th	withdrew, results stood
1933 Speedway National League	10th	
1936 Provincial Speedway League	3rd	
1937 Provincial Speedway League	3rd	Provincial Trophy and Coronation Cup winners
1938 Speedway National League Division Two	N/A	withdrew, replaced by Leeds Lions

== See also ==
- White City Stadium (Nottingham)
- Long Eaton Speedway
