= Stan Dell =

- Born: 31 October 1912; Coventry, England
- Died: 24 November 1950 (aged 38)
- Nationality: British (English)

Career history
- 1932–1933: Coventry
- 1934–1936: West Ham Hammers
- 1936: Cardiff Dragons
- 1936–1939: Hackney Wick Wolves
- 1946–1949: Birmingham Brummies

Team honours
- 1938: National Div II Champions
- 1936: London Cup Winner
- 1948: Anniversary Cup (Div 2) winner
- 1948: National Trophy (Div 2) winner

Thomas Stanley Dell (31 October 1912 – 24 November 1950) was a speedway rider.

== Career ==
Dell started his career at his local track at Coventry in 1932. When the track closed, he moved to the West Ham Hammers and spent three seasons at the Custom House track. During 1936, he rode for Cardiff in the Provincial League and then moved on to the Hackney Wick Wolves. In 1937, he broke his leg mid-way through the season but recovered to continue riding for Hackney, where he stayed until the outbreak of World War II. Dell won the National League Division II Championship with Hackney in 1938. Whilst riding for a Hackney at West Ham, he was involved in a crash that left him with a badly broken leg. Doctors thought an amputation would be needed, but Dell refused and his leg was saved.

After the war, Dell joined the Birmingham Brummies where he was awarded the captaincy. However, on 7 May 1949, Dell was involved in a big crash with Vic Duggan and Arthur Payne. Dell was left with terrible injuries. Despite attempting a comeback in July 1949, he was suffering from the effects of the crash.

Dell retired from racing at the end of that season and started a training school. The effects of the crash were still causing him health problems, and further surgery was required. He did not regain his health and died on 24 November 1950 aged just thirty-eight.
