= Tiger Hart =

British motorcycle speedway rider

- Born: 19 August 1907; Balham, London, England
- Died: 5 July 1996 (aged 88)
- Nationality: British (English)

Career history
- 1931: High Beech
- 1932–1933: West Ham Hammers
- 1934: Plymouth Tigers
- 1935–1936, 1939: Hackney Wick Wolves
- 1936: Nottingham
- 1937–1938: Birmingham Bulldogs
- 1946–1947: Birmingham Brummies

Philip Manston Hart (19 August 1907 – 5 July 1996) known as Tiger Hart during his speedway career was a motorcycle speedway rider from England. He competed in the earliest days of speedway and won two qualifying rounds of the 1938 Individual Speedway World Championship. He earned two international caps for the England national speedway team in unofficial test matches against Australia in 1937.

== Biography ==
Hart, born in Balham, London, was described as an Australian racer when he first arrived in Britain during the pioneer years of British speedway in 1930. However, it transpired that Hart had run away to Australia, aged just 16, after an argument with his father over the purchase of a motorbike. He even raced for Australia in an event at the Wessex Stadium in Copnor Gardens, Portsmouth, described as a match between England and Australia.

Hart began his British leagues career riding for High Beech, during the 1931 Speedway Southern League season. The following season, he was signed by the West Ham Hammers, when the Southern and Northern leagues merged to form the National League. Another season was spent at West ham in 1933 before he moved to race for the Plymouth Tigers on loan.

Hart transferred from West Ham to Hackney Wick Wolves in 1935, but struggled to find a starting place until 1936, when he raced with Hackney and also with Nottingham in the Provincial League. He also became a favourite at the Arlington Stadium in Eastbourne, winning some events there. In 1937, he only rode in the Provincial league, posting a 7.41 average for the Hall Green/Birmingham Bulldogs and topped their averages in 1938 at 8.82 and became their team captain. He made two appearances for England during 1937, with some newspapers confusing the fact that he was riding for England and not Australia.

In 1938, Hart also rode for a newly formed Eastbourne Eagles in the Sunday Amateur Dirt Track League and averaged 10.27. This was also the season that he had such a good run in the 1938 World Championship. He returned to his parent club Hackney in 1939 but the season was ended early by the outbreak of World War II.

After the war had finished, Hart resumed his speedway career with Birmingham Brummies from 1946 to 1947. He topped their averages in 1946.

After he retired, Hart became the team manager at Tamworth Hounds and later the Birmingham Brummies.
