= Speedway National League Division Two =

UK sports league

- Sport: Speedway
- Founded: 1938
- Folded: 1956
- Competitors: Varied
- Country: United Kingdom

The National League Division Two was the second tier of Speedway league competition in the United Kingdom, the second division of the National League. The competition was founded in 1938 following a competition named "The National Provincial League". Following World War II the second tier of racing was titled "The Northern League" in 1946 before evolving into National League Division Two in 1947.

== See also ==
List of United Kingdom Speedway League Champions
