= 1938 Speedway National League =

British speedway league season

- League: National League Division One
- No. of competitors: 7
- Champions: New Cross Rangers
- National Trophy: Wimbledon Dons
- A.C.U Cup: West Ham Hammers
- London Cup: Wimbledon Dons
- Highest average: Jack Milne
- Division/s below: National League (Div 2)

The 1938 National League Division One was the tenth season of the highest tier of motorcycle speedway in Great Britain.

== Summary ==
The only change from the previous season was Bristol Bulldogs moving up from the Provincial League and Hackney Wick Wolves moving down to take their place. They also swapped licences and riders as well as divisions.

New Cross Rangers won their first national title.

== Final table ==
| Pos | Team | PL | W | D | L | Pts |
|---|---|---|---|---|---|---|
| 1 | New Cross Rangers | 24 | 15 | 1 | 8 | 31 |
| 2 | West Ham Hammers | 24 | 13 | 1 | 10 | 27 |
| 3 | Wembley Lions | 24 | 13 | 1 | 10 | 27 |
| 4 | Wimbledon Dons | 24 | 12 | 3 | 9 | 27 |
| 5 | Belle Vue Aces | 24 | 11 | 0 | 13 | 22 |
| 6 | Harringay Tigers | 24 | 10 | 1 | 13 | 21 |
| 7 | Bristol Bulldogs | 24 | 6 | 1 | 17 | 13 |

== Fixtures & results ==
A fixtures

| Home \ Away | BV | BRI | HAR | NC | WEM | WH | WIM |
|---|---|---|---|---|---|---|---|
| Belle Vue | | 49–35 | 53–31 | 41–40 | 48–36 | 43–41 | 50–34 |
| Bristol | 40–41 | | 47–36 | 38–46 | 37–47 | 44–39 | 41–41 |
| Harringay | 51–30 | 41–42 | | 59–24 | 38–45 | 43–39 | 54–30 |
| New Cross | 55–28 | 51–33 | 56–28 | | 45–39 | 53–30 | 51–33 |
| Wembley | 54–30 | 57–27 | 50–34 | 37–46 | | 44–40 | 43–41 |
| West Ham | 46–38 | 55–29 | 55–28 | 41–39 | 40–34 | | 57–27 |
| Wimbledon | 48–36 | 53–31 | 41–41 | 44–39 | 42–42 | 49–34 | |

Legend: Blue = home team win; Yellow = draw; Red = away team win.

B fixtures

| Home \ Away | BV | BRI | HAR | NC | WEM | WH | WIM |
|---|---|---|---|---|---|---|---|
| Belle Vue | | 54–30 | 45–39 | 40–44 | 43–41 | 36–47 | 50–34 |
| Bristol | 45–38 | | 42–41 | 52–31 | 32–50 | 39.5–44.5 | 40–44 |
| Harringay | 52–32 | 45–39 | | 52–32 | 47–37 | 42–40 | 46–38 |
| New Cross | 55–29 | 48–34 | 54–29 | | 45–39 | 50–34 | 39–45 |
| Wembley | 47–36 | 54–28 | 49–35 | 35–48 | | 48–35 | 45–39 |
| West Ham | 56–28 | 54–30 | 50–33 | 42–42 | 50–34 | | 42–41 |
| Wimbledon | 51–31 | 47–35 | 48–35 | 43–39 | 47–36 | 45–39 | |

Legend: Blue = home team win; Yellow = draw; Red = away team win.

== Top ten riders ==
| | Rider | Nat | Team | C.M.A. |
|---|---|---|---|---|
| 1 | Jack Milne | (United States) | New Cross | 10.96 |
| 2 | Wilbur Lamoreaux | (United States) | Wimbledon | 10.93 |
| 3 | Bluey Wilkinson | (Australia) | West Ham | 10.67 |
| 4 | Lionel van Praag | (Australia) | Wembley | 10.50 |
| 5 | Bill Kitchen | (England) | Belle Vue | 10.24 |
| 6 | Cordy Milne | (United States) | Hackney | 9.46 |
| 7 | Frank Varey | (England) | Belle Vue | 9.16 |
| 8 | Jack Parker | (England) | Harringay | 9.16 |
| 9 | Les Wotton | (England) | Harringay | 8.92 |
| 10 | Frank Charles | (England) | Wembley | 8.59 |

== National Trophy ==
The 1938 National Trophy was the eighth edition of the Knockout Cup.

=== Qualifying rounds ===
Norwich Stars won the Division Two final and therefore secured a place in the quarter-finals.

Quarterfinals

| Date | Team one | Score | Team two |
|---|---|---|---|
| 01/07 | Bristol | 50-56 | West Ham |
| 05/07 | West Ham | 73-35 | Bristol |
| 06/07 | New Cross | 50-57 | Wimbledon |
| 07/07 | Wembley | 61-47 | Belle Vue |
| 09/07 | Belle Vue | 60-48 | Wembley |
| 11/07 | Wimbledon | 62-46 | New Cross |
| 21/07 | Norwich | 58-50 | Harringay |

Semifinals

| Date | Team one | Score | Team two |
|---|---|---|---|
| 06/08 | Norwich | 53-55 | Wembley |
| 15/08 | Wimbledon | 78-29 | West Ham |
| 16/08 | West Ham | 53-55 | Wimbledon |
| 25/08 | Wembley | 38-15 | Norwich |

=== Final ===
First leg

15 September 1938

| Wembley Lions Lionel van Praag 12 Tommy Price 8 Cliff Parkinson 7 Malcolm Craven 6 Eric Gregory 6 Frank Charles 3 George Wilks 1 Dicky Case 0 | 43 – 65 | Wimbledon Dons Wilbur Lamoreaux 18 Benny Kaufman 12 Geoff Pymar 11 Eric Collins 9 Wally Lloyd 8 Nobby Key 4 Norman Evans 2 Fred Leavis 1 |

Empire Stadium

Second leg

19 September 1938

| Wimbledon Dons Eric Collins 15 Wilbur Lamoreaux 14 Wally Lloyd 11 Benny Kaufman 7 Geoff Pymar 5 Nobby Key 2 Norman Evans 2 Fred Leavis 2 | 58 – 49 | Wembley Lions Frank Charles 12 Lionel van Praag 10 Malcolm Craven 8 George Wilks 7 Tommy Price 5 Eric Gregory 3 Wally Kilmister 2 Andy Menzies 2 |

Wimbledon Stadium

Wimbledon were National Trophy Champions, winning on aggregate 123-92.

== A.C.U Cup ==
The 1938 Auto-Cycle Union Cup was the fifth edition of the Cup and was won by West Ham Hammers, which ended the five year winning run of Belle Vue. The groups were decided on the number of heat points scored within matches, rather than match wins.

First round

Group 1

| Team | PL | W | D | L | Race Pts |
|---|---|---|---|---|---|
| West Ham Hammers | 4 | 3 | 1 | 0 | 252 |
| New Cross Rangers | 4 | 1 | 1 | 2 | 227 |
| Harringay Tigers | 4 | 1 | 0 | 3 | 166 |

Group 2

| Team | PL | W | D | L | Race Pts |
|---|---|---|---|---|---|
| Wimbledon Dons | 6 | 4 | 1 | 1 | 355 |
| Wembley Lions | 6 | 3 | 1 | 2 | 335 |
| Belle Vue Aces | 6 | 3 | 0 | 3 | 320 |
| Bristol Bulldogs | 6 | 1 | 0 | 5 | 283 |

Group 1

| Home \ Away | HAR | NC | WH |
|---|---|---|---|
| Harringay | | 57–51 | 42–64 |
| New Cross | 75–32 | | 54–54 |
| West Ham | 73–35 | 61–47 | |

Legend: Blue = home team win; Yellow = draw; Red = away team win.

Group 2

| Home \ Away | BV | BRI | WEM | WIM |
|---|---|---|---|---|
| Belle Vue | | 78–30 | 71–36 | 56–52 |
| Bristol | 74–34 | | 44–64 | 53–55 |
| Wembley | 67–40 | 61–47 | | 54–54 |
| Wimbledon | 67–41 | 73–35 | 54–53 | |

Legend: Blue = home team win; Yellow = draw; Red = away team win.

Final

| Date | Team one | Team two | Score |
|---|---|---|---|
| 05/09 | Wimbedon | West Ham | 50–58 |
| 06/09 | West Ham | Wimbledon | 64–43 |

== London Cup ==
First round

| Team one | Score | Team two |
|---|---|---|
| Harringay | 59–49, 44–60 | Wembley |

Semi final round

| Team one | Score | Team two |
|---|---|---|
| Wimbledon | 66–42, 61–47 | Wembley |
| West Ham | 56–52, 46–62 | New Cross |

=== Final ===
First leg

5 October 1938

| Wimbledon Wilbur Lamoreaux 16 Benny Kaufman 13 Geoff Pymar 8 Eric Collins 6 Norman Evans 4 Wally Lloyd 5 Nobby Key 4 Fred Leavis 1 | 57–49 | New Cross Jack Milne 13 Ron Johnson 11 George Newton 7 Clem Mitchell 6 Bill Longley 5 Stan Greatrex 3 Ray Duggan 2 Joe Francis 2 |

Plough Lane

Second leg

10 October 1938

| New Cross Jack Milne 18 Ron Johnson 10 Bill Longley 7 Stan Greatrex 5 Clem Mitchell 5 George Newton 5 Joe Francis 4 Ernie Evans 1 | 55–52 | Wimbledon Benny Kaufman 15 Wilbur Lamoreaux 11 Norman Evans 7 Wally Lloyd 6 Geoff Pymar 4 Eric Collins 4 Nobby Key 3 Fred Leavis 2 |

New Cross Stadium

Wimbledon won on aggregate 109–104

== Riders & final averages ==
Belle Vue

- (England) Bill Kitchen 10.24
- (England) Frank Varey 9.43
- (England) Eric Langton 8.39
- (England) Bob Harrison 5.68
- (England) Jack Hargreaves 5.43
- (England) Oliver Langton 5.25
- (England) Wally Hull 4.42
- (England) Ernie Price 3.59
- (England) Harold Jackson 3.43
- (England) Oliver Hart 1.38

Bristol

- (United States) Cordy Milne 9.46
- (Australia) Vic Duggan 7.14
- (Denmark) Morian Hansen 5.95
- (England) Bill Clibbett 5.93
- (Australia) Bill Rogers 5.69
- (England) Harry Shepherd 4.87
- (England) Roy Dook 4.20
- (England) Reg Lambourne 3.29
- (Australia) Bill Maddern 3.28

Harringay

- (England) Jack Parker 9.14
- (England) Les Wotton 8.88
- (England) Alec Statham 8.00
- (England) Jack Ormston 6.31
- (England) Norman Parker 5.30
- (England) Lloyd Goffe 5.13
- (England) Bill Pitcher 4.78
- (England) Will Lowther 3.64
- (England) Dick Harris 3.58

New Cross

- (United States) Jack Milne 10.96
- (England) George Newton 8.35
- (England) Ron Johnson 7.87
- (England) Stan Greatrex 6.61
- (Australia) Bill Longley 6.45
- (Australia) Clem Mitchell 6.09
- (Canada) Goldy Restall 5.05
- (England) Joe Francis 4.10
- (Australia) Ernie Evans 4.00

Wembley

- (Australia) Lionel Van Praag 10.50
- (England) Frank Charles 8.48
- (England) Malcolm Craven 6.99
- (England) George Wilks 6.91
- (England) Cliff Parkinson 6.52
- (England) Tommy Price 6.14
- (Australia) Dicky Case 5.95
- (England) Eric Gregory 4.88
- (New Zealand) Wally Kilmister 4.59
- (Australia) Andy Menzies 4.00

West Ham

- (Australia) Bluey Wilkinson 10.67
- (England) Arthur Atkinson 8.42
- (Canada) Eric Chitty 8.00
- (England) Tommy Croombs 7.88
- (Canada) Jimmie Gibb 6.69
- (Australia) Charlie Spinks 5.80
- (England) Colin Watson 4.75
- (England) Tiger Stevenson 5.41
- (England) Broncho Dixon 4.69
- (England) Dick Geary 3.83
- (England) Phil Bishop 3.53

Wimbledon

- (United States) Wilbur Lamoreaux 10.93
- (United States) Benny Kaufman 8.46
- (England) Geoff Pymar 7.96
- (Australia) Wally Little 7.56
- (Australia) Eric Collins 5.74
- (England) Wally Lloyd 5.28
- (England) Norman Evans 4.44
- (England) Nobby Key 4.12
- (England) Ron Howes 2.26
- (England) Fred Leavis 2.12

== See also ==
- List of United Kingdom Speedway League Champions
- Knockout Cup (speedway)
