= 1939 Individual Speedway World Championship =

Fourth (canceled) edition of the World motorcycle speedway championship

Seasons
- ← 1938 1949 →

The 1939 Individual Speedway World Championship was cancelled due to the outbreak of World War II. It would have been the fourth edition of the official World Championship to determine the world champion rider.

The final, due to be held at Wembley on 7 September was cancelled, just four days after the declaration of war by Britain on Germany.

== Qualifying round ==
- The top 28 riders qualify for Championship round.

Date	Venue	Winner
2 June	Cleveland Park Stadium	George Greenwood
3 June	Hackney Wick Stadium	Andy Menzies
6 June	Knowle Stadium	Dick Harris
8 June	Owlerton Stadium	Stan Williams
10 June	Crystal Palace Exhibition Grounds	Aub Lawson
12 June	Brough Park Stadium	George Pepper
15 June	Sun Street Stadium	Jeff Lloyd
17 June	The Firs Stadium	George Greenwood
1 July	Harringay Stadium	Jack Milne
4 July	West Ham Stadium	Arthur Atkinson
8 July	Hyde Road	Bill Kitchen
12 July	New Cross Stadium	Aub Lawson & Jack Milne
19 July	Banister Court Stadium	Frank Goulden
24 July	Wimbledon Stadium	Cordy Milne

== Championship round ==
Date	Venue	Winner
2 August	Banister Court Stadium	Cordy Milne
5 August	Harringay Stadium	Jack Parker
15 August	West Ham Stadium	Eric Langton
17 August	Wembley Stadium	Lionel Van Praag
19 August	Hyde Road	Eric Langton
21 August	Wimbledon Stadium	Cordy Milne
23 August	New Cross Stadium	Wilbur Lamoreaux & Eric Langton

== Points ==
- The top 16 riders (and 2 reserves) over 7 Championship rounds would qualify for the World final.

Pos.	Rider	Qual Points	Points carried forward
1	(United States) Cordy Milne	53	8
2	(England) Eric Langton	51	7
3	(United States) Wilbur Lamoreaux	50	7
4	(England) Bill Kitchen	47	7
5	(Australia) Vic Duggan	45	6
6	(Australia) Lionel Van Praag	44	6
7	(England) Arthur Atkinson	40	6
8	(United States) Jack Milne	40	6
9	(England) Alec Statham	36	5
10	(England) Jack Parker	34	5
11	(United States) Benny Kaufman	33	5
12	(Canada) Eric Chitty	32	5
13	(Australia) Ron Johnson	32	5
14	(England) Frank Varey	31	4
15	(England) Eric Collins	30	4
16	(Australia) Aub Lawson	29	4

Pos.	Rider	Qual Points	c/f
17	(England) Malcolm Craven	27	res
18	(England) Frank Goulden	24	res
19	(England) Tommy Croombs	22	
20	(Canada) Jimmie Gibb	21	
21	(England) Bob Harrison	19	
22	(England) Norman Parker	17	
23	(England) Wally Lloyd	16	
24	(England) Bill Pitcher	14	
25	(England) Tommy Price	13	
26	(England) Jack Hargreaves	9	
27	(England) Stan Greatrex	7	
28	(England) Stan Williams	7	

== World final ==
- Wembley Stadium, London, 7 September 1939
- Cancelled due to the outbreak of World War II.
