= List of Individual Speedway World Championship medalists =

Motorcycle speedway World Championship winners

This is the complete list of official Individual Speedway World Championship and Speedway Grand Prix medalists from 1936 to 2020. (N.B.: Winners of Speedway World Championships between 1931 and 1935, staged prior to FIM accreditation in 1936, are given elsewhere.)

== Medalists ==
Year	Venue	Winner	Runner-up	3rd place
1936 details	(England) London; Wembley Stadium	(Australia) Lionel Van Praag (26+3 pts)	(England) Eric Langton (26+2 pts)	(Australia) Bluey Wilkinson (25 pts)
1937 details	(England) London; Wembley Stadium	(United States) Jack Milne (28 pts)	(United States) Wilbur Lamoreaux (25 pts)	(United States) Cordy Milne (23 pts)
1938 details	(England) London; Wembley Stadium	(Australia) Bluey Wilkinson (22 pts)	(United States) Jack Milne (21 pts)	(United States) Wilbur Lamoreaux (20 pts)
1939 details	(England) London; Wembley Stadium	The Final was cancelled due to the outbreak of World War II.		
Championship suspended 1940-1948 due to World War II
1949 details	(England) London; Wembley Stadium	(England) Tommy Price (15 pts)	(England) Jack Parker (14 pts)	(England) Louis Lawson (13 pts)
1950 details	(England) London; Wembley Stadium	(Wales) Freddie Williams (14 pts)	(England) Wally Green (13 pts)	(Australia) Graham Warren (12 pts)
1951 details	(England) London; Wembley Stadium	(Australia) Jack Young (12+3 pts)	(England) Split Waterman (12+2 pts)	(Australia) Jack Biggs (12+1 pts)
1952 details	(England) London; Wembley Stadium	(Australia) Jack Young (14 pts)	(Wales) Freddie Williams (13 pts)	(England) Bob Oakley (12 pts)
1953 details	(England) London; Wembley Stadium	(Wales) Freddie Williams (14 pts)	(England) Split Waterman (13 pts)	(New Zealand) Geoff Mardon (12+3 pts)
1954 details	(England) London; Wembley Stadium	(New Zealand) Ronnie Moore (15 pts)	(England) Brian Crutcher (13+3 pts)	(Sweden) Olle Nygren (13+2 pts)
1955 details	(England) London; Wembley Stadium	(England) Peter Craven (13 pts)	(New Zealand) Ronnie Moore (12+3 pts)	(New Zealand) Barry Briggs (12+2 pts)
1956 details	(England) London; Wembley Stadium	(Sweden) Ove Fundin (13 pts)	(New Zealand) Ronnie Moore (12 pts)	(England) Arthur Forrest (11+3 pts)
1957 details	(England) London; Wembley Stadium	(New Zealand) Barry Briggs (14+3 pts)	(Sweden) Ove Fundin (14+2 pts)	(England) Peter Craven (11+3 pts)
1958 details	(England) London; Wembley Stadium	(New Zealand) Barry Briggs (15 pts)	(Sweden) Ove Fundin (13 pts)	(Australia) Aub Lawson (11+3 pts)
1959 details	(England) London; Wembley Stadium	(New Zealand) Ronnie Moore (15 pts)	(Sweden) Ove Fundin (13 pts)	(New Zealand) Barry Briggs (11+3 pts)
1960 details	(England) London; Wembley Stadium	(Sweden) Ove Fundin (14+3 pts)	(New Zealand) Ronnie Moore (14+2 pts)	(England) Peter Craven (14+1 pts)
1961 details	(Sweden) Malmö; Malmö Stadion	(Sweden) Ove Fundin (14 pts)	(Sweden) Björn Knutson (12+3 pts)	(Sweden) Göte Nordin (12+2 pts)
1962 details	(England) London; Wembley Stadium	(England) Peter Craven (14 pts)	(New Zealand) Barry Briggs (13 pts)	(Sweden) Ove Fundin (10+3 pts)
1963 details	(England) London; Wembley Stadium	(Sweden) Ove Fundin (14 pts)	(Sweden) Björn Knutson (13 pts)	(New Zealand) Barry Briggs (12 pts)
1964 details	(Sweden) Gothenburg; Ullevi	(New Zealand) Barry Briggs (15 pts)	(Soviet Union) Igor Plekhanov (13+3 pts)	(Sweden) Ove Fundin (13+2 pts)
1965 details	(England) London; Wembley Stadium	(Sweden) Björn Knutson (14 pts)	(Soviet Union) Igor Plekhanov (13+3 pts)	(Sweden) Ove Fundin (13+2 pts)
1966 details	(Sweden) Gothenburg; Ullevi	(New Zealand) Barry Briggs (15 pts)	(Norway) Sverre Harrfeldt (14 pts)	(Poland) Antoni Woryna (13 pts)
1967 details	(England) London; Wembley Stadium	(Sweden) Ove Fundin (14+3 pts)	(Sweden) Bengt Jansson (14+2 pts)	(New Zealand) Ivan Mauger (13 pts)
1968 details	(Sweden) Gothenburg; Ullevi	(New Zealand) Ivan Mauger (15 pts)	(New Zealand) Barry Briggs (12 pts)	(Poland) Edward Jancarz (11+3 pts)
1969 details	(England) London; Wembley Stadium	(New Zealand) Ivan Mauger (14 pts)	(New Zealand) Barry Briggs (11+3 pts)	(Sweden) Sören Sjösten (11+2 pts)
1970 details	(Poland) Wrocław; Olympic Stadium	(New Zealand) Ivan Mauger (15 pts)	(Poland) Paweł Waloszek (14 pts)	(Poland) Antoni Woryna (13 pts)
1971 details	(Sweden) Gothenburg; Ullevi	(Denmark) Ole Olsen (15 pts)	(New Zealand) Ivan Mauger (12+3 pts)	(Sweden) Bengt Jansson (12+2 pts)
1972 details	(England) London; Wembley Stadium	(New Zealand) Ivan Mauger (13+3 pts)	(Sweden) Bernt Persson (13+2 pts)	(Denmark) Ole Olsen (12 pts)
1973 details	(Poland) Chorzów; Silesian Stadium	(Poland) Jerzy Szczakiel (13+3 pts)	(New Zealand) Ivan Mauger (13+F pts)	(Poland) Zenon Plech (12 pts)
1974 details	(Sweden) Gothenburg; Ullevi	(Sweden) Anders Michanek (15 pts)	(New Zealand) Ivan Mauger (11+3 pts)	(Sweden) Sören Sjösten (11+2 pts)
1975 details	(England) London; Wembley Stadium	(Denmark) Ole Olsen (15 pts)	(Sweden) Anders Michanek (13 pts)	(England) John Louis (12+3 pts)
1976 details	(Poland) Chorzów; Silesian Stadium	(England) Peter Collins (14 pts)	(England) Malcolm Simmons (13 pts)	(Australia) Phil Crump (12 pts)
1977 details	(Sweden) Gothenburg; Ullevi	(New Zealand) Ivan Mauger (14 pts)	(England) Peter Collins (13 pts)	(Denmark) Ole Olsen (12+3 pts)
1978 details	(England) London; Wembley Stadium	(Denmark) Ole Olsen (13 pts)	(England) Gordon Kennett (12 pts)	(United States) Scott Autrey (11+3 pts)
1979 details	(Poland) Chorzów; Silesian Stadium	(New Zealand) Ivan Mauger (14 pts)	(Poland) Zenon Plech (13 pts)	(England) Michael Lee (11+3 pts)
1980 details	(Sweden) Gothenburg; Ullevi	(England) Michael Lee (14 pts)	(England) Dave Jessup (12+3 pts)	(Australia) Billy Sanders (12+2 pts)
1981 details	(England) London; Wembley Stadium	(United States) Bruce Penhall (14 pts)	(Denmark) Ole Olsen (12+3 pts)	(Denmark) Tommy Knudsen (12+2 pts)
1982 details	(United States) Los Angeles; Memorial Coliseum	(United States) Bruce Penhall (14 pts)	(England) Les Collins (13 pts)	(United States) Dennis Sigalos (12 pts)
1983 details	(West Germany) Norden; Motodrom Halbemond	(West Germany) Egon Müller (15 pts)	(Australia) Billy Sanders (12 pts)	(England) Michael Lee (11 pts)
1984 details	(Sweden) Gothenburg; Ullevi	(Denmark) Erik Gundersen (14 pts)	(Denmark) Hans Nielsen (13+3 pts)	(United States) Lance King (13+2 pts)
1985 details	(England) Bradford; Odsal Stadium	(Denmark) Erik Gundersen (13+3 pts)	(Denmark) Hans Nielsen (13+2 pts)	(United States) Sam Ermolenko (13+1 pts)
1986 details	(Poland) Chorzów; Silesian Stadium	(Denmark) Hans Nielsen (14 pts)	(Denmark) Jan O. Pedersen (13 pts)	(England) Kelvin Tatum (12 pts)
1987 details	(Netherlands) Amsterdam; Olympic Stadium	(Denmark) Hans Nielsen (27 pts)	(Denmark) Erik Gundersen (24+3 pts)	(United States) Sam Ermolenko (24+2 pts)
1988 details	(Denmark) Vojens; Speedway Center	(Denmark) Erik Gundersen (14+3 pts)	(Denmark) Hans Nielsen (14+2 pts)	(Denmark) Jan O. Pedersen (13 pts)
1989 details	(West Germany) Munich; Olympic Stadium	(Denmark) Hans Nielsen (15 pts)	(England) Simon Wigg (12+3 pts)	(England) Jeremy Doncaster (12+2 pts)
1990 details	(England) Bradford; Odsal Stadium	(Sweden) Per Jonsson (13+3 pts)	(United States) Shawn Moran (13+2 pts); Void - disqualified	(Australia) Todd Wiltshire (12 pts)
1991 details	(Sweden) Gothenburg; Ullevi	(Denmark) Jan O. Pedersen (15 pts)	(Sweden) Tony Rickardsson (12 pts)	(Denmark) Hans Nielsen (11+3 pts)
1992 details	(Poland) Wrocław; Olympic Stadium	(England) Gary Havelock (14 pts)	(Sweden) Per Jonsson (11 pts)	(Denmark) Gert Handberg (10 pts)
1993 details	(Germany) Pocking; Rottalstadion	(United States) Sam Ermolenko (12 pts)	(Denmark) Hans Nielsen (11+3 pts)	(England) Chris Louis (11+2 pts)
1994 details	(Denmark) Vojens; Speedway Center	(Sweden) Tony Rickardsson (12+3 pts)	(Denmark) Hans Nielsen (12+2 pts)	(Australia) Craig Boyce (12+1 pts)

=== Grand Prix Series (since 1995) ===
Year	Venue	Winner	Runner-up	3rd place
1995 details	6 events	(Denmark) Hans Nielsen (103 pts)	(Sweden) Tony Rickardsson (88 pts)	(United States) Sam Ermolenko (83 pts)
1996 details	6 events	(United States) Billy Hamill (113 pts)	(Denmark) Hans Nielsen (111 pts)	(United States) Greg Hancock (88 pts)
1997 details	6 events	(United States) Greg Hancock (118 pts)	(United States) Billy Hamill (111 pts)	(Poland) Tomasz Gollob (92 pts)
1998 details	6 events	(Sweden) Tony Rickardsson (111 pts)	(Sweden) Jimmy Nilsen (99 pts)	(Poland) Tomasz Gollob (97 pts)
1999 details	6 events	(Sweden) Tony Rickardsson (111 pts)	(Poland) Tomasz Gollob (98 pts)	(Denmark) Hans Nielsen (76 pts)
2000 details	6 events	(England) Mark Loram (102 pts)	(United States) Billy Hamill (95 pts)	(Sweden) Tony Rickardsson (94 pts)
2001 details	6 events	(Sweden) Tony Rickardsson (121 pts)	(Australia) Jason Crump (113 pts)	(Poland) Tomasz Gollob (89 pts)
2002 details	10 events	(Sweden) Tony Rickardsson (181 pts)	(Australia) Jason Crump (162 pts)	(Australia) Ryan Sullivan (158 pts)
2003 details	9 events	(Denmark) Nicki Pedersen (152 pts)	(Australia) Jason Crump (144 pts)	(Sweden) Tony Rickardsson (127 pts)
2004 details	9 events	(Australia) Jason Crump (158 pts)	(Sweden) Tony Rickardsson (155 pts)	(United States) Greg Hancock (137 pts)
2005 details	9 events	(Sweden) Tony Rickardsson (196 pts)	(Australia) Jason Crump (154 pts)	(Australia) Leigh Adams (107 pts)
2006 details	10 events	(Australia) Jason Crump (188 pts)	(United States) Greg Hancock (144 pts)	(Denmark) Nicki Pedersen (134 pts)
2007 details	11 events	(Denmark) Nicki Pedersen (196 pts)	(Australia) Leigh Adams (153 pts)	(Australia) Jason Crump (124 pts)
2008 details	11 events	(Denmark) Nicki Pedersen (174 pts)	(Australia) Jason Crump (152 pts)	(Poland) Tomasz Gollob (148 pts)
2009 details	11 events	(Australia) Jason Crump (159 pts)	(Poland) Tomasz Gollob (144 pts)	(Russia) Emil Sayfutdinov (138 pts)
2010 details	11 events	(Poland) Tomasz Gollob (166 pts)	(Poland) Jarosław Hampel (137 pts)	(Australia) Jason Crump (135 pts)
2011 details	11 events	(United States) Greg Hancock (164 pts)	(Sweden) Andreas Jonsson (124 pts)	(Poland) Jarosław Hampel (122 pts)
2012 details	12 events	(Australia) Chris Holder (160 pts)	(Denmark) Nicki Pedersen (152 pts)	(United States) Greg Hancock (148 pts)
2013 details	12 events	(England) Tai Woffinden (151 pts)	(Poland) Jarosław Hampel (142 pts)	(Denmark) Niels-Kristian Iversen (132 pts)
2014 details	12 events	(United States) Greg Hancock (140 pts)	(Poland) Krzysztof Kasprzak (132 pts)	(Denmark) Nicki Pedersen (121 pts)
2015 details	12 events	(England) Tai Woffinden (163 pts)	(United States) Greg Hancock (147 pts)	(Denmark) Nicki Pedersen (131 pts)
2016 details	11 events	(United States) Greg Hancock (139 pts)	(England) Tai Woffinden (130 pts)	(Poland) Bartosz Zmarzlik (128 pts)
2017 details	12 events	(Australia) Jason Doyle (161 pts)	(Poland) Patryk Dudek (143 pts)	(England) Tai Woffinden (131 pts)
2018 details	10 events	(England) Tai Woffinden (139 pts)	(Poland) Bartosz Zmarzlik (129 pts)	(Sweden) Fredrik Lindgren (109 pts)
2019 details	10 events	(Poland) Bartosz Zmarzlik (132 pts)	(Denmark) Leon Madsen (130 pts)	(Russia) Emil Sayfutdinov (126 pts)
2020 details	8 events	(Poland) Bartosz Zmarzlik (133 pts)	(England) Tai Woffinden (117 pts)	(Sweden) Fredrik Lindgren (117 pts)
2021 details	11 events	(Russia) Artem Laguta (192 pts)	(Poland) Bartosz Zmarzlik (189 pts)	(Russia) Emil Sayfutdinov (149 pts)
2022 details	10 events	(Poland) Bartosz Zmarzlik (166 pts)	(Denmark) Leon Madsen (133 pts)	(Poland) Maciej Janowski (106 pts)
2023 details	10 events	(Poland) Bartosz Zmarzlik (158 pts)	(Sweden) Fredrik Lindgren (150 pts)	(Slovakia) Martin Vaculík (125 pts)
2024 details	11 events	(Poland) Bartosz Zmarzlik (179 pts)	(England) Robert Lambert (144 pts)	(Sweden) Fredrik Lindgren (141 pts)
2025 details	10 events	(Poland) Bartosz Zmarzlik (183 pts)	(Australia) Brady Kurtz (182 pts)	(England) Dan Bewley (142 pts)
2026 details	10 events	(England) Robert Lambert (162 pts)	(Poland) Bartosz Zmarzlik (160 pts)	(Australia) Brady Kurtz (157 pts)

=== Medal table ===
Rank	Nation	Gold	Silver	Bronze	Total
1	Sweden	14	15	13	42
2	Denmark	14	12	11	37
3	New Zealand	12	9	5	26
4	England	11	15	13	39
5	Australia	9	8	13	30
6	United States	9	6	11	26
7	Poland	8	11	11	30
8	Wales	2	1	0	3
9	Russia	1	0	3	4
10	Germany	1	0	0	1
11	Soviet Union	0	2	0	2
12	Norway	0	1	0	1
13	Slovakia	0	0	1	1
Totals (13 entries)		81	80	81	242

=== Winners by country ===
Country	Wins	Winner(s)
Denmark	14	Hans Nielsen (4), Ole Olsen (3), Erik Gundersen (3), Nicki Pedersen (3), Jan O. Pedersen (1)
Sweden	14	Tony Rickardsson (6), Ove Fundin (5), Björn Knutson (1), Anders Michanek (1), Per Jonsson (1)
New Zealand	12	Ivan Mauger (6), Barry Briggs (4), Ronnie Moore (2)
England	11	Tai Woffinden (3), Peter Craven (2), Tommy Price (1), Peter Collins (1), Michael Lee (1), Gary Havelock (1), Mark Loram (1), Robert Lambert (1)
United States	9	Greg Hancock (4), Bruce Penhall (2), Jack Milne (1), Sam Ermolenko (1), Billy Hamill (1)
Australia	9	Jason Crump (3), Jack Young (2), Lionel Van Praag (1), Bluey Wilkinson (1), Chris Holder (1), Jason Doyle (1)
Poland	8	Bartosz Zmarzlik (6), Jerzy Szczakiel (1), Tomasz Gollob (1)
Wales	2	Freddie Williams (2)
Germany	1	Egon Müller (1)
Russia	1	Artem Laguta (1)

=== Medals by winners ===
Name	Gold	Silver	Bronze	Total
(Sweden) Tony Rickardsson	6	3	2	11
(Poland) Bartosz Zmarzlik	6	3	1	10
(New Zealand) Ivan Mauger	6	3	1	10
(Sweden) Ove Fundin	5	3	3	11
(Denmark) Hans Nielsen	4	6	2	12
(New Zealand) Barry Briggs	4	3	3	10
(United States) Greg Hancock	4	2	3	9
(Australia) Jason Crump	3	5	2	10
(England) Tai Woffinden	3	2	1	6
(Denmark) Nicki Pedersen	3	1	3	7
(Denmark) Ole Olsen	3	1	2	6
(Denmark) Erik Gundersen	3	1	0	4
(New Zealand) Ronnie Moore	2	3	0	5
(Wales) Freddie Williams	2	1	0	3
(England) Peter Craven	2	0	2	4
(United States) Bruce Penhall	2	0	0	2
(Australia) Jack Young	2	0	0	2
(Poland) Tomasz Gollob	1	2	4	7
(United States) Billy Hamill	1	2	0	3
(Sweden) Björn Knutson	1	2	0	3
(Denmark) Jan O. Pedersen	1	1	1	3
(Sweden) Anders Michanek	1	1	0	2
(United States) Jack Milne	1	1	0	2
(Sweden) Per Jonsson	1	1	0	2
(England) Peter Collins	1	1	0	2
(England) Robert Lambert	1	1	0	2
(United States) Sam Ermolenko	1	0	3	4
(England) Michael Lee	1	0	2	3
(Australia) Bluey Wilkinson	1	0	1	2
(Russia) Artem Laguta	1	0	0	1
(Australia) Chris Holder	1	0	0	1
(Germany) Egon Müller	1	0	0	1
(England) Gary Havelock	1	0	0	1
(Australia) Jason Doyle	1	0	0	1
(Poland) Jerzy Szczakiel	1	0	0	1
(Australia) Lionel Van Praag	1	0	0	1
(England) Mark Loram	1	0	0	1
(England) Tommy Price	1	0	0	1
Totals (38 entries)	81	49	36	166

== See also ==
- Motorcycle speedway
