= Speedway World Championship Classification =

The table below is a classified table of every speedway rider to have finished in the top three of a Speedway World Championship competition.

== Classification ==
=== Riders ===
No.	Rider	Nationality	Total
1.	Tony Rickardsson	Sweden	11	6	3	2
2.	Ivan Mauger	New Zealand	10	6	3	1
3.	Bartosz Zmarzlik	Poland	10	6	3	1
4.	Ove Fundin	Sweden	11	5	3	3
5.	Hans Nielsen	Denmark	12	4	6	2
6.	Barry Briggs	New Zealand	10	4	3	3
7.	Greg Hancock	United States	9	4	2	3
8.	Jason Crump	Australia	10	3	5	2
9.	Tai Woffinden	England	6	3	2	1
10.	Nicki Pedersen	Denmark	7	3	1	3
11.	Ole Olsen	Denmark	6	3	1	2
12.	Erik Gundersen	Denmark	4	3	1	—
13.	Ronnie Moore	New Zealand	5	2	3	—
14.	Freddie Williams	Wales	3	2	1	—
15.	Peter Craven	England	4	2	—	2
16.	Jack Young	Australia	2	2	—	—
	Bruce Penhall	United States	2	2	—	—
18.	Tomasz Gollob	Poland	7	1	2	4
19.	Björn Knutson	Sweden	3	1	2	—
	Billy Hamill	United States	3	1	2	—
21.	Jan O. Pedersen	Denmark	3	1	1	1
22.	Jack Milne	United States	2	1	1	—
	Anders Michanek	Sweden	2	1	1	—
	Peter Collins	England	2	1	1	—
	Per Jonsson	Sweden	2	1	1	—
	Robert Lambert	England	2	1	1	—
27.	Sam Ermolenko	United States	4	1	—	3
28.	Michael Lee	England	3	1	—	2
29.	Bluey Wilkinson	Australia	2	1	—	1
30.	Lionel Van Praag	Australia	1	1	—	—
	Tommy Price	England	1	1	—	—
	Jerzy Szczakiel	Poland	1	1	—	—
	Egon Müller	Germany	1	1	—	—
	Gary Havelock	England	1	1	—	—
	Mark Loram	England	1	1	—	—
	Chris Holder	Australia	1	1	—	—
	Jason Doyle	Australia	1	1	—	—
	Artem Laguta	Russia	1	1	—	—
39.	Jarosław Hampel	Poland	3	—	2	1
40.	Split Waterman	England	2	—	2	—
	Igor Plekhanov	Soviet Union	2	—	2	—
	Leon Madsen	Denmark	2	—	2	—
43.	Fredrik Lindgren	Sweden	4	—	1	3
44.	Wilbur Lamoreaux	United States	2	—	1	1
	Bengt Jansson	Sweden	2	—	1	1
	Zenon Plech	Poland	2	—	1	1
	Billy Sanders	Australia	2	—	1	1
	Leigh Adams	Australia	2	—	1	1
	Brady Kurtz	Australia	2	—	1	1
50.	Eric Langton	England	1	—	1	—
	Jack Parker	England	1	—	1	—
	Wally Green	England	1	—	1	—
	Sverre Harrfeldt	Norway	1	—	1	—
	Brian Crutcher	England	1	—	1	—
	Paweł Waloszek	Poland	1	—	1	—
	Bernt Persson	Sweden	1	—	1	—
	Malcolm Simmons	England	1	—	1	—
	Gordon Kennett	England	1	—	1	—
	Dave Jessup	England	1	—	1	—
	Les Collins	England	1	—	1	—
	Simon Wigg	England	1	—	1	—
	Jimmy Nilsen	Sweden	1	—	1	—
	Andreas Jonsson	Sweden	1	—	1	—
	Krzysztof Kasprzak	Poland	1	—	1	—
	Patryk Dudek	Poland	1	—	1	—
66.	Emil Sayfutdinov	Russia	3	—	—	3
67.	Antoni Woryna	Poland	2	—	—	2
	Sören Sjösten	Sweden	2	—	—	2
69.	Cordy Milne	United States	1	—	—	1
	Louis Lawson	England	1	—	—	1
	Graham Warren	Australia	1	—	—	1
	Jack Biggs	Australia	1	—	—	1
	Bob Oakley	England	1	—	—	1
	Geoff Mardon	New Zealand	1	—	—	1
	Olle Nygren	Sweden	1	—	—	1
	Arthur Forrest	England	1	—	—	1
	Aub Lawson	Australia	1	—	—	1
	Gote Nordin	Sweden	1	—	—	1
	Edward Jancarz	Poland	1	—	—	1
	John Louis	England	1	—	—	1
	Phil Crump	Australia	1	—	—	1
	Scott Autrey	United States	1	—	—	1
	Tommy Knudsen	Denmark	1	—	—	1
	Dennis Sigalos	United States	1	—	—	1
	Lance King	United States	1	—	—	1
	Kelvin Tatum	England	1	—	—	1
	Jeremy Doncaster	England	1	—	—	1
	Todd Wiltshire	Australia	1	—	—	1
	Gert Handberg	Denmark	1	—	—	1
	Chris Louis	England	1	—	—	1
	Craig Boyce	Australia	1	—	—	1
	Ryan Sullivan	Australia	1	—	—	1
	Niels-Kristian Iversen	Denmark	1	—	—	1
	Maciej Janowski	Poland	1	—	—	1
	Martin Vaculík	Slovakia	1	—	—	1
	Dan Bewley	England	1	—	—	1
No.	Rider	Nationality	Total

=== Countries ===
No.	Country	Total
1.	Sweden	42	14	15	13
2.	Denmark	37	14	12	11
3.	New Zealand	26	12	9	5
4.	England	38	10	15	13
5.	Australia	29	9	8	12
6.	United States	26	9	6	11
7.	Poland	29	8	10	11
8.	Wales	3	2	1	—
9.	Russia	4	1	—	3
10.	Germany	1	1	—	—
11.	Soviet Union	2	—	2	—
12.	Norway	1	—	1	—
13.	Slovakia	1	—	-	1
No.	Country	Total

== See also ==
- Motorcycle speedway
