= Charles Cullum (speedway rider) =

American motorcycle speedway rider (1913 – 1990)

- Born: March 8, 1913; Missouri, United States
- Died: January 9, 1990 (aged 76)

Career history
- 1949–1950: Belle Vue Aces

Individual honours
- 1936: Dirt Track Championnat du Monde

Team honours
- 1949: National Trophy

Charles Leonard Cullum (March 8, 1913 – January 9, 1990) was a motorcycle speedway rider from the United States.

== Biography ==
Cullum, born in Missouri, was part of Putt Mossman's motorcycle stunt team in the mid-1930s, after the pair met at a motorcycle dealership. Cullum and Mossman travelled all over the America and beyond, performing wild stunts. He gained the unwanted nickname of Pee-Wee Cullum due to his size.

Cullum took up speedway and won the Dirt Track Championnat du Monde (an early version of the Speedway World Championship and rival of the Star Riders' Championship) at Stade Buffalo in Paris during 1936.

As America's third best rider in 1949, behind Wilbur Lamoreaux and Jack Milne, the Belle Vue Aces were keen to secure a contract with Cullum but faced problems over S.R.A rules.

However, Cullum did begin his British leagues career riding for Belle Vue Aces, during the 1949 Speedway National League season. He won the National Trophy with the Manchester club during his debut season. Another highlight was also reaching the Championship round of the 1949 Individual Speedway World Championship.

The following season in 1950, Cullum signed on again for Belle Vue and improved his average to 7.02, despite struggling with cartilage issues in the summer and wearing a special steel leg brace.
