= 1938 Individual Speedway World Championship =

Third edition of the World motorcycle speedway championship

Seasons
- ← 1937 1939 →

The 1938 Individual Speedway World Championship was the third edition of the official World Championship to determine the world champion rider.

The Championship was won by the 28 year-old Australian Arthur 'Bluey' Wilkinson, in front of a new record crowd for speedway of 95,000. The newspapers reported that despite extra police one of the worst traffic jams of the year resulted after the meeting was over and that the air was thick with petrol fumes.

== Qualifying round ==
- The top 28 riders over the 13 qualifying rounds would qualify for the Championship round.

Date	Venue	Winner
11 May	Perry Barry Stadium	Tiger Hart
18 May	Banister Court Stadium	Frank Goulden
24 May	White City Nottingham	Tiger Hart
26 May	Owlerton Stadium	Billy Lamont & Tommy Allott
4 June	The Firs Stadium	Wal Morton
7 June	Brough Park Stadium	Doug Wells
11 June	Hackney Wick Stadium	Doug Wells
21 June	West Ham Stadium	Bluey Wilkinson
23 June	Knowle Stadium	Cordy Milne
9 July	Harringay Stadium	Tommy Croombs
16 July	Hyde Road	Jack Milne
18 July	Wimbledon Stadium	Wilbur Lamoreaux
20 July	New Cross Stadium	Jack Milne

== Championship round ==
Date	Venue	Winner
30 July	Hyde Road	Wilbur Lamoreaux
5 August	Knowle Stadium	Cordy Milne
8 August	Wimbledon Stadium	Geoff Pymar
17 August	New Cross Stadium	Bluey Wilkinson
18 August	Wembley Stadium	Jack Milne & Wilbur Lamoreaux
20 August	Harringay Stadium	Lionel Van Praag
23 August	West Ham Stadium	Bluey Wilkinson & Jack Milne

=== Points ===
The top 16 riders and 1 reserve, over the 7 Championship rounds would qualify for the World final.

Pos.	Rider	Qual Points	c/f
1	(Australia) Bluey Wilkinson	53	8
2	(United States) Wilbur Lamoreaux	52	7
3	(United States) Cordy Milne	50	7
4	(United States) Jack Milne	49	7
5	(Australia) Lionel Van Praag	49	7
6	(England) Bill Kitchen	40	6
7	(England) Eric Langton	37	5
8	(England) Alec Statham	37	5
9	(United States) Benny Kaufman	36	5
10	(England) Geoff Pymar	35	5
11	(England) Arthur Atkinson	34	5
12	(England) George Newton	34	5
13	(England) Jack Parker	31	4
14	(England) Tommy Croombs	29	4
15	(England) Frank Varey	29	4
16	(England) Tommy Price	27	4

Pos.	Rider	Qual Points	c/f
17	(England) Jack Ormston	26	4
18	(Australia) Vic Duggan	25	
19	(Australia) Ron Johnson	25	
20	(Canada) Jimmie Gibb	24	
21	(England) Les Wotton	17	
22	(England) Wally Lloyd	16	
23	(England) Eric Gregory	16	
24	(Denmark) Morian Hansen	13	
25	(Australia) Clem Mitchell	12	
26	(England) George Wilks	12	
27	(Australia) Bert Spencer	7	
28	(Australia) Charlie Spinks	4	

== World final ==
- 1 September 1938
- (England) Wembley Stadium, London
- Attendance: 95,000 (all-time Wembley speedway attendance record)

Pos.	Rider	c/f	Final Points	Final Heats	Total Points
1	(Australia) Bluey Wilkinson	8	14	(3,3,3,3,2)	22
2	(United States) Jack Milne	7	14	(3,3,2,3,3)	21
3	(United States) Wilbur Lamoreaux	7	13	(3,1,3,3,3)	20
4	(Australia) Lionel Van Praag	7	11	(3,2,2,1,3)	18
5	(England) Bill Kitchen	6	9	2,2,1,2,2)	15
6	(United States) Cordy Milne	7	8	(1,3,3,0,1)	15
7	(England) Alec Statham	5	8	(2,3,0,0,3)	13
8	(England) Eric Langton	5	8	(1,2,2,3,0)	13
9	(United States) Benny Kaufman	5	7	(2,1,0,2,2)	12
10	(England) Jack Parker	4	6	(2,2,2,0,0)	10
11	(England) Arthur Atkinson	5	5	(1,0,2,1,1)	10
12	(England) Jack Ormston (res)	4	5	(3,2)	9
13	(England) Tommy Price	4	4	(1,0,1,2,0)	8
14	(England) Tommy Croombs	4	4	(0,1,1,1,1)	8
15	(England) George Newton	5	2	(0,1,0,1,0)	7
16	(England) Geoff Pymar	5	2	(0,0,1,0,1)	7
17	(England) Frank Varey	4	0	(0,0,0,-,-)	4
