= Jimmie Gibb =

Canadian motorcycle speedway rider (1911 – 2013)

- Born: 17 August 1911; Vancouver, British Columbia, Canada.
- Died: 21 October 2013 (aged 102)
- Nationality: Canadian

Career history
- 1938–1939: West Ham Hammers
- 1949, 1951: Wimbledon Dons

Team honours
- 1951: National Trophy
- 1938: A.C.U. Cup

Hamish Archibald Gibb (7 August 1911 – 21 October 2013) was a Canadian international motorcycle speedway rider.

== Biography ==
Gibb was born in Vancouver, British Columbia and raced in California as early as 1931. He began his British leagues career riding for West Ham Hammers during the 1938 Speedway National League season, following his fellow Canadian Eric Chitty into West Ham colours. While at West Ham in 1938, he won the A.C.U Cup. He also reached the Championship round of the 1938 Individual Speedway World Championship.

Gibb continued riding for West Ham, averaging 8.58 in 1939 but World War II finished the season early and Gibb lost six years of his speedway career as a result of the war. During the war, he served with the Canadian Air Force.

Gibb worked on Hollywood film sets before returning to Britain, where he would ride for Wimbledon Dons during the 1949 Speedway National League season. He completed one more season with the Dons in 1951, winning the National Trophy with them.
