= Dick Harris (speedway rider) =

British motorcycle speedway rider

- Born: 24 January 1909; Littlehampton, West Sussex, England
- Died: 5 February 1987 (aged 78); Broad Oak, Wealden Heathfield, East Sussex
- Nationality: British (English)

Career history
- 1938–1939: Harringay Tigers
- 1938: Lea Bridge Cubs
- 1946–1950: Wimbledon Dons
- 1951: Wolverhampton Wasps
- 1952: St Austell Gulls
- 1953: Plymouth Devils

Richard Cranwell Harris (24 January 1909 – 5 February 1987) was an international motorcycle speedway rider from England. He earned five international caps for the England national speedway team.

== Biography ==
Harris, born in Littlehampton, West Sussex, worked in the printing and carpentry trades before earning enough money to buy a motorbike to ride in grasstrack competitions for the Hastings Motorcycle Club during 1935. He won the Silver Wings trophy in 1936. He began his British leagues career riding for Harringay Tigers during the 1938 Speedway National League and also appeared for the Lea Bridge Cubs in the second division.

Harris continued with Harringay in 1939 but broke his leg in August, which ended his season. As it turned out, the entire league season ended shortly afterwards due to the outbreak of war. During the war years, Harris appeared in charity meetings earning funds for the war effort. When league action returned in 1946, he joined Wimbledon Dons and he enjoyed a solid season in 1947, averaging 5.61 for the London club. At the end of the 1947 season, he was selected for England to tour Australia during the winter.

After a failed transfer exchange with Odsal Boomerangs in early 1948, Harris remained with Wimbledon until the end of the 1950 season but his form failed to improve any further. Odsal made another attempt to sign him in April 1951 but he eventually rode a few matches for Wolverhampton Wasps instead. He then rode matches for the St Austell Gulls during the 1952 Speedway Southern League.
