= 1936 Individual Speedway World Championship =

First official edition of the World motorcycle speedway championship

Seasons
- ← none 1937 →

The 1936 Speedway World Final programme.

The 1936 Individual Speedway World Championship was the first ever Speedway World Championship and was won by Lionel Van Praag of Australia. The forerunner to the World Championship was generally regarded to be the Star Riders' Championship. The final was held at London's Wembley Stadium in front of 74,000. It was the first of a record 26 times that Wembley would host the World Final with the last being in 1981.

== Summary ==
The World Championship would consist of qualifying heats and then a Championship round, where points would be carried forward to the final to determine the winner. One of the favourites Jack Parker had a broken hand injury and was unable to compete in the final. Joe Abbott was also unable to line up for the final due to injury, despite qualifying for the final. They were replaced by Arthur Atkinson and Bill Pitcher.

Despite being unbeaten in the Final, Australian Bluey Wilkinson only finished third as the Championship was decided by bonus points accumulated in previous rounds plus the score from the final. Van Praag defeated England's Eric Langton in a runoff to be declared the inaugural Speedway World Champion.

As they lined up at the tapes for the runoff, Langton broke them which would ordinarily lead to disqualification. However, Van Praag stated he did not want to win the title by default and insisted that a race should take place. At the restart Langton made it to the first bend in front and led until the final bend on the last lap when Van Praag darted through the smallest of gaps to win by less than wheel length.

Afterwards, controversial allegations were abound that the two riders had 'fixed' the match race, deciding between them that the first person to the first bend would win the race and the Championship and split the prize money; Langton led into the first bend but was overtaken by Van Praag. Van Praag reportedly paid Langton £50 "conscience money" after the race for going back on the agreement.

In the Championship round the top 16 riders over 7 rounds would qualify for the World final. Ron Johnson and Bill Pitcher qualified as first reserves.

== Qualifying round ==
- Top 28 riders qualify for Championship round

Date	Venue	Winner
26 May	West Ham Stadium	Jack Parker
30 May	Hyde Road	Bluey Wilkinson
6 June	Harringay Stadium	Frank Charles
19 June	Hackney Wick Stadium	Arthur Atkinson & Jack Ormston
20 June	Wimbledon Stadium	Fred Tate
25 June	Wembley Stadium	Ron Johnson
1 July	New Cross Stadium	Joe Abbott

== Championship round ==
- The top 16 riders over the 7 qualifying rounds and 7 championship rounds would qualify for the World final.

Date	Venue	Winner
11 July	Harringay Stadium	Jack Parker
14 July	West Ham Stadium	Eric Langton
23 July	Wembley Stadium	Lionel Van Praag
29 July	New Cross Stadium	George Newton
8 August	Hyde Road	Eric Langton
10 August	Wimbledon Stadium	Lionel Van Praag
14 August	Hackney Wick Stadium	Frank Charles

Qualifying points (top 16 qualify, 2 reserves)

Pos.	Rider	Qual Points	c/f
1	(England) Eric Langton	66	13
2	(England) Frank Charles	59	12
3	(England) George Newton	59	12
4	(England) Jack Parker	59	12
5	(Australia) Lionel Van Praag	58	12
6	(Denmark) Morian Hansen	48	10
7	(England) Bob Harrison	48	10
8	(Australia) Vic Huxley	48	10
9	(Australia) Bluey Wilkinson	48	10
10	(Australia) Dicky Case	47	9
11	(England) Jack Ormston	47	9
12	(United States) Jack Milne	45	9
13	(United States) Cordy Milne	43	9
14	(England) Ginger Lees	37	7
15	(England) Wal Phillips	37	7
16	(England) Joe Abbott	36	7

Pos.	Rider	Qual Points	c/f
17	(Australia) Ron Johnson	34	7
18	(England) Bill Pitcher	32	6
19	(England) Arthur Atkinson	31	6
20	(England) Bill Kitchen (res)	29	n/a
21	(England) Norman Parker	28	6
22	(Denmark) Baltzer Hansen	27	
23	(Canada) Eric Chitty	24	
24	(England) Bill Clibbett	24	
25	(England) Broncho Dixon	22	
26	(New Zealand) Wally Kilmister	22	
27	(Australia) Mick Murphy	21	
28	(England) Wally Lloyd (res)	17	
29	(England) Gus Kuhn	15	
30	(England) Rol Stobbart	16	
31	(England) Gordon Byers (res)	9	

== World final ==
- 10 September 1936
- (England) Wembley Stadium, London

Pos.	Rider	c/f	Final Points	Final Heats	Total Points
1	(Australia) Lionel Van Praag	12	14	(3,3,3,2,3)	26+3
2	(England) Eric Langton	13	13	(3,3,3,2,2)	26+2
3	(Australia) Bluey Wilkinson	10	15	(3,3,3,3,3)	25
4	(United States) Cordy Milne	9	11	(2,2,1,3,3)	20
5	(England) Frank Charles	12	8	(3,3,0,2,0)	20
6	(Australia) Dicky Case	9	8	(2,0,3,1,2)	17
7	(England) Jack Ormston	9	8	(1,1,2,3,1)	17
8	(Australia) Vic Huxley	10	7	(1,2,0,2,2)	17
9	(England) George Newton	12	4	(0,0,3,1,0)	16
10	(United States) Jack Milne	9	6	(1,2,1,0,2)	15
11	(Denmark) Morian Hansen	10	5	(2,1,2,0,0)	15
12	(England) Bob Harrison	10	5	(0,0,2,0,3)	15
13	(England) Wal Phillips	7	5	(1,1,0,2,1)	12
14	(England) Jack Parker	12	-	-	12
15	(England) Ginger Lees	7	4	(2,0,1,0,1)	11
16	(England) Arthur Atkinson	6	3	(0,2,1,0,0)	9
17	(England) Bill Pitcher	6	2	(0,1,X/-,0,1)	8
18	(England) Norman Parker (res)	6	1	(1)	7
19	(England) Joe Abbott	7	-	-	7

== Podium ==
1. (gold) (Australia) Lionel Van Praag
2. (silver) (England) Eric Langton
3. (bronze) (Australia) Bluey Wilkinson
