= 1937 Individual Speedway World Championship =

Second official edition of the World motorcycle speedway championship

Seasons
- ← 1936 1938 →

The 1937 Individual Speedway World Championship was the second edition of the official World Championship to determine the world champion rider.

An attendance of 85,000 (a record for speedway in the United Kingdom at the time) saw Jack Milne win all five races to head an all USA top three on the podium. The track was criticised and was described as being too deep with cinders.

The 1937 Speedway World Final programme.

== Qualifying round ==
- Top 28 riders qualify for Championship round

Date	Venue	Winner
24 May	Wimbledon Stadium	Wilbur Lamoreaux
29 May	Harringay Stadium	Lionel Van Praag
2 June	New Cross Stadium	Jack Parker
5 June	Hyde Road	Eric Langton
18 June	Hackney Wick Stadium	Cordy Milne
22 June	West Ham Stadium	George Newton

== Championship round ==
- The top 16 riders over the 6 qualifying rounds and 7 championship rounds would qualify for the World final.

Date	Venue	Winner
7 July	New Cross Stadium	Jack Milne
10 July	Harringay Stadium	Jack Milne
19 July	Wimbledon Stadium	Jack Milne & Ginger Lees
24 July	Hyde Road	Jack Milne
29 July	Wembley Stadium	Lionel Van Praag & Wilbur Lamoreaux
3 August	West Ham Stadium	Eric Langton
13 August	Hackney Wick Stadium	Arthur Atkinson

Top 16 qualifiers (2 reserves)

Pos.	Rider	Qual Points	c/f
1	(United States) Jack Milne	83	13
2	(England) Eric Langton	78	12
3	(United States) Wilbur Lamoreaux	74	12
4	(United States) Cordy Milne	71	11
5	(Canada) Eric Chitty	70	11
6	(Australia) Lionel Van Praag	70	11
7	(England) Jack Parker	69	11
8	(England) George Newton	67	11
9	(England) Frank Charles	64	10
10	(England) Ginger Lees	61	10
11	(England) Frank Varey	51	8
12	(England) Arthur Atkinson	50	8
13	(England) Joe Abbott	49	8
14	(Denmark) Morian Hansen	45	7
15	(England) Bob Harrison	45	7
16	(England) Bill Kitchen	45	7

Pos.	Rider	Qual Points	c/f
17	(England) Tommy Croombs	39	6
18	(England) Alec Statham	39	6
19	(England) Stan Greatrex	38	
20	(Australia) Ron Johnson	37	
21	(New Zealand) Wally Kilmister	35	
22	(Australia) Dicky Case	34	
23	(Australia) Charlie Spinks	33	
24	(England) Cliff Parkinson	31	
25	(England) Jack Ormston	30	
26	(England) Norman Evans	28	
27	(England) Broncho Dixon (res)	25	
28	(England) Eric Gregory	24	
29	(England) Tiger Stevenson	21	
30	(England) Tommy Price (res)	20	

== World final ==
- 2 September 1937
- (England) Wembley Stadium, London

Pos.	Rider	c/f Points	Final Points	Final Heats	Total Points
1	(United States) Jack Milne	13	15	(3,3,3,3,3)	28
2	(United States) Wilbur Lamoreaux	12	13	(3,3,3,1,3)	25
3	(United States) Cordy Milne	11	12	(2,3,2,3,2)	23
4	(England) Jack Parker	11	10	(2,3,1,2,2)	21
5	(England) Ginger Lees	10	9	(1,1,2,2,3)	19
6	(England) Frank Charles	10	7	(0,0,1,3,3)	17
7	(Australia) Lionel Van Praag	11	6	(3,0,-,3,0)	17
8	(England) Bill Kitchen	7	9	(1,2,2,2,2)	16
9	(England) George Newton	11	5	(3,0,0,0,2)	16
10	(England) Eric Langton	12	4	(1,0,0,3,0)	16
11	(Denmark) Morian Hansen	7	8	(1,2,3,1,1)	15
12	(Canada) Eric Chitty	11	4	(0,2,0,1,1)	15
13	(England) Joe Abbott	8	6	(2,1,1,2,0)	14
14	(England) Arthur Atkinson	8	6	(2,0,2,1,1)	14
15	(England) Frank Varey	8	3	(0,1,1,0,1)	11
16	(England) Tommy Croombs (res)	6	2	(0,2,0,0,0)	8
17	(England) Bob Harrison	7	-	-	7
18	(England) Alec Statham (res)	6	0	(0)	6
