= Northern Riders' Championship =

British motorcycle speedway competition

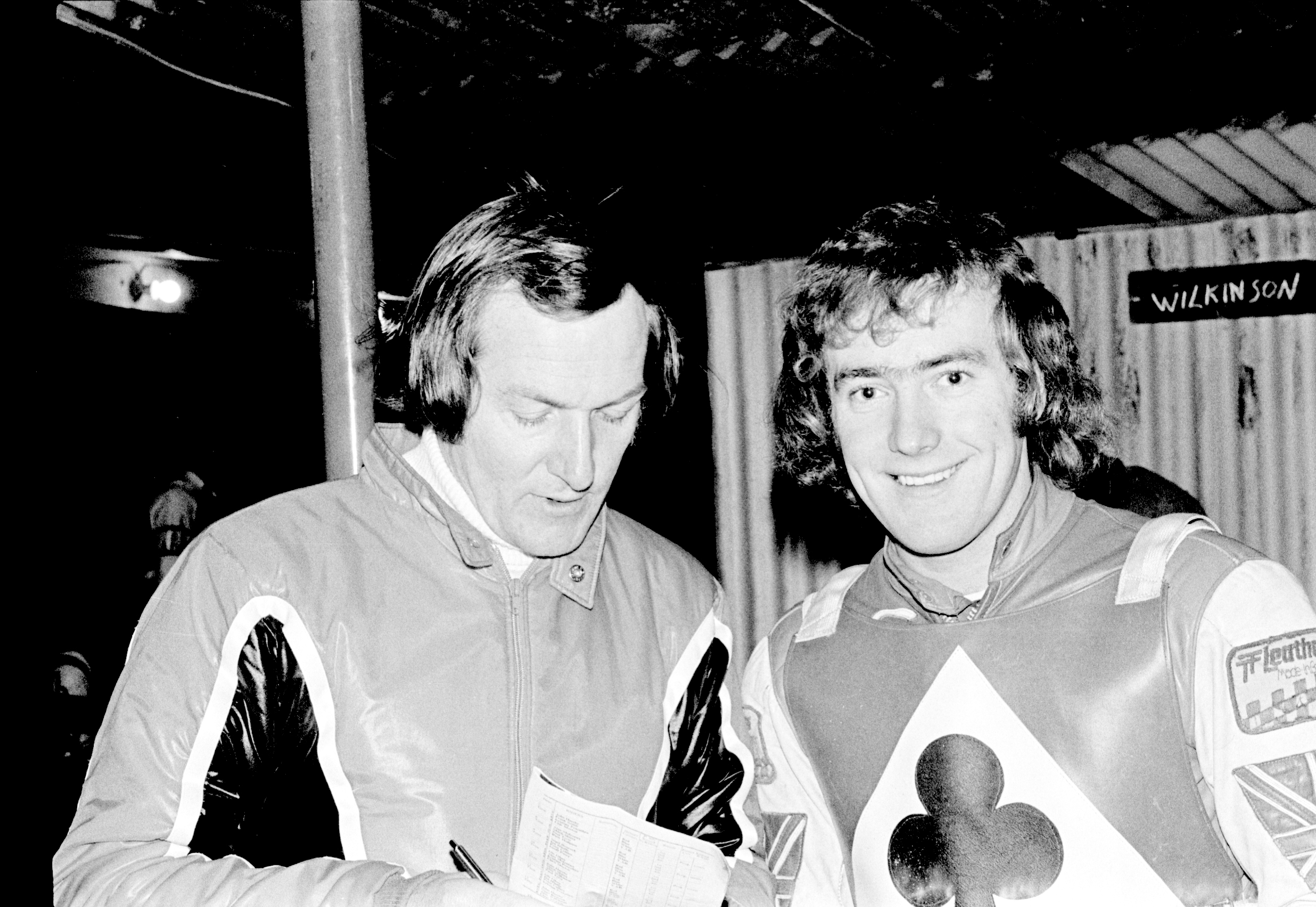
- Eric Boocock (left) 1970 winner and Peter Collins (right) three time winner
- Sport: motorcycle speedway
- Founded: 1938
- Folded: 2010
- Country: United Kingdom

The Northern Riders' Championship was an individual Motorcycle speedway competition inaugurated in 1938 and revived in 1960 for top riders of teams from the North of Great Britain.

== Past winners ==
Year	Winner	Team	Venue	Ref
1938	Tommy Croombs ( (England) )	West Ham Hammers	Hyde Road, Belle Vue	
1939 Not staged
1940	Bill Kitchen ( (England) )	Belle Vue Aces	Hyde Road, Belle Vue	
1941	Oliver Hart ( (England) )	Belle Vue Aces	Hyde Road, Belle Vue	
1942	Eric Chitty ( (Canada) )	West Ham Hammers	Hyde Road, Belle Vue	
1943	Norman Parker ( (England) )	Harringay Tigers	Hyde Road, Belle Vue	
1944	Norman Parker ( (England) )	Harringay Tigers	Hyde Road, Belle Vue	
1945	Alec Statham ( (England) )	Harringay Tigers	Hyde Road, Belle Vue	
1946	Bill Longley ( (Australia) )	Odsal Boomerangs	Knowle Stadium, Bristol	
1947-1959 Not staged
1960	Tony Robinson ( (England) )	Sheffield Tigers	Owlerton Stadium, Sheffield	
1961	Tony Robinson ( (England) )	Sheffield Tigers	Owlerton Stadium, Sheffield	
1962-1963 Not staged
1964	Ivan Mauger ( (New Zealand) )	Newcastle Diamonds	Brough Park, Newcastle	
1965-1966 Not staged
1967	Ivan Mauger ( (New Zealand) )	Newcastle Diamonds	Owlerton Stadium, Sheffield	
1968	Ivan Mauger ( (New Zealand) )	Newcastle Diamonds	Owlerton Stadium, Sheffield	
1969	Ivan Mauger ( (New Zealand) )	Belle Vue Aces	Owlerton Stadium, Sheffield	
1970	Eric Boocock ( (England) )	Halifax Dukes	Owlerton Stadium, Sheffield	
1971	Jim Airey ( (Australia) )	Sheffield Tigers	Owlerton Stadium, Sheffield	
1972	Ivan Mauger ( (New Zealand) )	Belle Vue Aces	Owlerton Stadium, Sheffield	
1973	Bob Valentine ( (Australia) )	Sheffield Tigers	Owlerton Stadium, Sheffield	
1974	Peter Collins ( (England) )	Belle Vue Aces	Owlerton Stadium, Sheffield	
1975	Peter Collins ( (England) )	Belle Vue Aces	Owlerton Stadium, Sheffield	
1976	Doug Wyer ( (England) )	Sheffield Tigers	Owlerton Stadium, Sheffield	
1977	Alan Wilkinson ( (England) )	Belle Vue Aces	Owlerton Stadium, Sheffield	
1978	Reg Wilson ( (England) )	Sheffield Tigers	Owlerton Stadium, Sheffield	
1979	Doug Wyer ( (England) )	Sheffield Tigers	Owlerton Stadium, Sheffield	
1980	Ivan Mauger ( (New Zealand) )	Hull Vikings	Owlerton Stadium, Sheffield	
1981	Kenny Carter ( (England) )	Halifax Dukes	Owlerton Stadium, Sheffield	
1982	Shawn Moran ( (United States) )	Sheffield Tigers	Owlerton Stadium, Sheffield	
1983	Chris Morton ( (England) )	Belle Vue Aces	Hyde Road, Belle Vue	
1984	Peter Collins ( (England) )	Belle Vue Aces	The Shay, Halifax	
1985	Shawn Moran ( (United States) )	Sheffield Tigers	Owlerton Stadium, Sheffield	
1986	Peter Carr ( (England) )	Sheffield Tigers	Hyde Road, Belle Vue	
1987	Chris Morton ( (England) )	Belle Vue Aces	Owlerton Stadium, Sheffield	
1988-1991 Not staged
1992	Sam Ermolenko ( (United States) )	Wolverhampton Wolves	Owlerton Stadium, Sheffield	
1993	Chris Morton ( (England) )	Sheffield Tigers	Owlerton Stadium, Sheffield	
1994	Roman Matousek ( (Czech Republic) )	Sheffield Tigers	Owlerton Stadium, Sheffield	
1995	Gary Havelock ( (England) )	Bradford Dukes	Owlerton Stadium, Sheffield	
1996	Sam Ermolenko ( (United States) )	Sheffield Tigers	Owlerton Stadium, Sheffield	
1997	Joe Screen ( (England) )	Bradford Dukes	Owlerton Stadium, Sheffield	
1998	Brent Werner ( (United States) )	Newcastle Diamonds	Owlerton Stadium, Sheffield	
1999-2000 Not staged
2001	Carl Stonehewer ( (England) )	Workington Comets	Owlerton Stadium, Sheffield	
2002 Not staged
2003	Sean Wilson ( (England) )	Sheffield Tigers	Owlerton Stadium, Sheffield	
2004	Simon Stead ( (England) )	Sheffield Tigers	Owlerton Stadium, Sheffield	
2005	Sean Wilson ( (England) )	Sheffield Tigers	Owlerton Stadium, Sheffield	
2006-2009 Not staged
2010	Ricky Ashworth ( (England) )	Sheffield Tigers	Owlerton Stadium, Sheffield	
