= Australian Speedway Hall of Fame =

The Australian Speedway Hall of Fame was inaugurated in 2007 to recognise the contributions made to Australian speedway.

In 2006 Speedway Australia formed the National Speedway Induction Committee (NSIC) consisting of competitors, promoters, media members, historians and vintage association members from all mainland states of Australia to nominate and select eligible candidates for induction into the Hall of Fame.

The inaugural Hall of Fame dinner was held in the Bradman Room at the Adelaide Oval in 2007.

== Hall of Fame ==
Inductees:

- 2007
  - Grenville Anderson †
  - Frank Arthur †
  - Kym Bonython †
  - Don Mackay †
  - Hedlee McGee †
  - Con Migro
  - Ray Revell †
  - Garry Rush
  - Johnny Stewart †
  - George Tatnell †
- 2008
  - Dick Britton
  - Jeff Freeman †
  - Mike Raymond
  - John Sherwood †
  - John Sidney
  - Lionel Van Praag †
  - Arthur 'Bluey' Wilkinson †
  - Bill Wigzell †
  - Jack Young †
- 2009
  - Steve Brazier
  - Phil Crump
  - Jimmy Davies †
  - Peter Dodd
  - Glen Dix
  - Johnny Fenton
  - Kevin Fischer †
  - Peter Gurbiel
  - Harry Neale †
  - Alex Rowe †
- 2011
  - John Boulger
  - Sir Jack Brabham †
  - Alan Felsch
  - Michael Figliomeni †
  - Jeff Gitus †
  - Bill Goode
  - Sid Hopping
  - Graeme McCubbin †
  - Geoff Murphy
  - Dennis Nash
  - Blair Shepherd
  - Fred Tracey †

† Deceased
