= George Newton (speedway rider) =

British motorcycle speedway rider

- Born: 27 January 1913; Ash Vale, Surrey, England
- Died: 5 October 1984 (aged 71); Plymouth, Devon, England
- Nationality: British (English)

Career history
- 1932-1933: Crystal Palace Glaziers
- 1934-1938, 1948: New Cross Rangers
- 1949: Fleetwood Flyers
- 1950: Walthamstow Wolves
- 1951-1952: Liverpool Chads
- 1952: St Austell Gulls

Team honours
- 1938, 1948: National League Champion
- 1934, 1937: London Cup Winner

George William Newton (27 January 1913 in Ash Vale, England – 5 October 1984) was an international speedway rider who featured in the first Speedway World Championship in final in 1936. Newton also rode under the alias of Bill Bennett and he earned 12 international caps for the England national speedway team.

== Career ==
Newton started his career with the Crystal Palace Glaziers in 1932 and stayed with the promotion when they moved to New Cross in 1934. He made his England debut in 1936 and qualified for the World final, his first of three. At the end of the 1938 season Newton retired due to illness, but not before helping New Cross to the National League championship.

After the war, Newton made a surprise comeback, after a benefit meeting was arranged for him in 1947 as he was still suffering from illness. He returned to the New Cross team in 1948 as they won the Championship for the second time.

Further surgery at the end of 1948 was needed and it was assumed that Newton would retire but in 1949 he joined the Fleetwood Flyers in the National League Division Two, where he recorded eight maximum scores in fifty appearances.

1950 saw Newton at Walthamstow Wolves followed by a season with the Liverpool Chads in 1951. He started 1952 with the Chads but moved to St Austell Gulls of the Southern League for the remainder of the season, before becoming their team manager for the following two seasons.

== World Final Appearances ==
1937 cigarette card

- 1936 - (England) London, Wembley Stadium - 9th - 4pts + 12 semi-final points
- 1937 - (England) London, Wembley Stadium - 9th - 5pts + 11 semi-final points
- 1938 - (England) London, Wembley Stadium - 15th - 2pts + 5 semi-final points

== Players cigarette cards ==
Newton is listed as number 33 of 50 in the 1930s Player's cigarette card collection.
