= Geoff Pymar =

British motorcycle speedway rider

- Born: 14 February 1912; Eye, Suffolk, England
- Died: 2 March 2002 (aged 90)
- Nationality: British (English)

Career history
- 1933-1939: Wimbledon Dons
- 1946-1948: New Cross Rangers
- 1949-1950: Harringay Racers
- 1950-1955: Bristol Bulldogs
- 1956-1957: Norwich Stars
- 1960: Yarmouth Bloaters
- 1961: Middlesbrough Bears
- 1961: Wolverhampton Wolves
- 1962: Bradford Panthers

Team honours
- 1948: National League Champion
- 1954: National League Div 2 Champion
- 1938: National Trophy Winner
- 1938, 1939, 1947: London Cup Winner
- 1954: Southern Shield Winner

Geoffrey Pymar (14 February 1912 Eye, Suffolk – 2 March 2002) was an English international motorcycle speedway rider who rode in the World Championship final in 1938. He earned 12 international caps for the England national speedway team.

== Career ==
Pymar was the son of a farmer. After first racing motorcycles in 1931, he took up speedway in 1933, racing at Norwich that year. Pymar started his career with the Norwich Stars, a non-league outfit, spotted by Wimbledon Dons and rode at the Wimbledon Stadium for seven seasons until the outbreak of World War II. In 1938 he was part of the Wimbledon team that won the National Trophy. Also in 1938, he competed in the World Championship Final at Wembley Stadium. In 1934, 1935 and 1939 Pymar represented England in Test Matches.

After the war, Pymar joined New Cross Rangers and in 1948 was a member of their National League Championship winning team. In 1949, he joined the Harringay Racers for a fee of over £1,200. The following season, the newly promoted Bristol Bulldogs paid the Racers £1,000 for Pymar's services.

Pymar stayed with Bulldogs until they closed in 1955 and he was expected to retire. However, in 1956 he joined the Norwich Stars and rode for two seasons. He did not ride in 1958 or 1959 but in 1960 he was signed by the Yarmouth Bloaters in the newly formed Provincial League. The Bloaters lasted just one season but Pymar was approached by the Middlesbrough Bears to ride for them. After starting the season with the Bears, the travelling became too much and Pymar was transferred to the Wolverhampton Wolves. He had one final season with the Bradford Panthers in 1962 before he finally retired.

== World Final appearances ==
- 1938 - (England) London, Wembley Stadium - 16th - 7pts

== After retirement ==
Pymar became a golf caddy and was regularly seen on the tour with Tony Jacklin. In 2002 he was voted as President of the Veteran Speedway Riders Association but died whilst in office.

== Players cigarette cards ==
Pymar is listed as number 38 of 50 in the 1930s Player's cigarette card collection.
