= George Wilks =

British speedway rider (1908–1981)

- Born: 23 February 1908; London, England
- Died: 18 December 1981 (aged 73); Hertfordshire, England
- Nationality: British (English)

Career history
- 1934: Harringay Tigers
- 1935–1937: Hackney Wick Wolves
- 1938–1939, 1946–1954: Wembley Lions
- 1949: West Ham Hammers

Team honours
- 1946, 1947, 1950, 1951, 1952: National League Champion
- 1948: National Trophy Winner
- 1947: British Speedway Cup Winner
- 1936, 1946, 1948, 1950, 1951: London Cup Winner

George James Wilks (23 February 1908 – 18 December 1981) was a British motorcycle speedway rider who rode for Harringay and Wembley. He earned nine international caps for the England national speedway team.

== Career ==
Born in East End of London, Wilks was riding motorbikes before he was a teenager, racing in grasstrack and also travelled to the Isle of Man to compete in the TT in 1929, only to suffer injuries in practice which led to five months in hospital, and a break of three years from motorcycle racing. In the early 1930s he won the South Midlands grasstrack title several times, and was encouraged to move to speedway by Australian international Frank Arthur. He first rode for Harringay, transferring to Hackney Wick at the end of 1935 for a transfer fee of £25. In early 1938 he was transferred to Wembley for £350, finishing as third-highest points scorer in his first season with the Lions. He worked in a factory during World War II, returning to Wembley when speedway resumed, and was part of the team that won the National League Championship and the London Cup in 1946.

Wilks was first called up by England in 1939, as a reserve in the final test against Australia at Wembley, but did not ride. In 1947 he rode at reserve for England in the second test match against Australia at West Ham, scoring ten points from four rides. He also rode in the final test at Wembley, scoring nine points. He rode in the first test at Wimbledon in 1948, scoring eleven points in England's 61–45 win.

Wilks continued to ride for Wembley in 1948, but his career was interrupted by a fractured thigh. The following season in 1949, he was loaned to West Ham as a temporary replacement for Eric Chitty who had broken a leg. He retired in 1954. He opened a bicycle shop in Radlett, Hertfordshire. In 1975, George and his son, who ran the shop with him, changed the bicycle shop into a Honda motorcycle dealership.

== Players cigarette cards ==
Wilks is listed as number 49 of 50 in the 1930s Player's cigarette card collection.
