= Arthur Atkinson (speedway rider) =

British speedway rider (1911–1993)

- Born: 12 November 1911; Nelson, Lancashire
- Died: July 1993 (aged 81)
- Nationality: British (English)

Career history
- 1929: Leeds Lions
- 1930: Wembley Lions
- 1931-1939, 1951: West Ham Hammers
- 1952-1953: Harringay Racers

Individual honours
- 1930: WA State Champion (Aus)
- 1930: Australian Champion (2 miles)

Team honours
- 1929: English Dirt Track League Champions
- 1930: Southern League Champions
- 1937: National League Champions
- 1930, 1952, 1953: London Cup
- 1938: ACU Cup
- 1937: Coronation Gold Cup Best Pairs
- 1952: National Trophy
- 1953: Coronation Cup

Arthur Atkinson (12 November 1911 – July 1993) was an international motorcycle speedway rider and promoter who appeared in the first Speedway World Championship final in 1936.

== Biography ==
Atkinson began riding motorcycles at the age of thirteen. He rode in trials and grasstrack before taking up speedway in 1928 with Blackpool. In 1929, he joined Leeds, captaining the team, and in 1930, won the Western Australia Championship. In 1930, he joined the Johnnie Hoskins-managed Wembley Lions. The team won the Southern League, but in the last league meeting of the season, Atkinson was left unconscious after a crash. He missed most of the 1931 season after a dispute with Wembley, but in September 1931, he joined the West Ham Hammers.

Atkinson toured Australia in 1929/30, winning both the first of two Australian 2 mile Championship's held at the Exhibition Speedway in Melbourne, and the Western Australian Championship at the Claremont Speedway in Perth.

1936 saw Atkinson selected for England against Australia in the test series and was a regular up to the war. He would go on to earn 30 international caps.

Atkinson married Eileen Thorpe (the secretary of Johnnie Hoskins) on 23 October 1937 and the couple left for Australia, where Atkinson raced that winter. In 1937 the Hammers won the National League Championship and in 1938 they won the ACU Cup. Atkinson remained with Hammers until the outbreak of World War II, in which Atkinson served in the Royal Air Force.

After the war, Atkinson managed the West Ham Hammers alongside Stan Greatrex from 1946 until 1949. In 1950 Atkinson and his wife Eileen 'Tippy' Thorpe became promoters at the newly formed Rayleigh Rockets. Whilst promoting at Rayleigh he returned to riding again, for West Ham, but the twelve years away from competitive riding showed in his scoring. In 1952 he was signed by the Harringay Racers for £80 and scored reasonably well but after a poor start to 1953 Atkinson retired from racing for ever.

In addition to his speedway career, Atkinson ran a farm with his wife.

== World final appearances ==
- 1936 - (England) London, Wembley Stadium - 16th - 3pts + 6 semi-final points
- 1937 - (England) London, Wembley Stadium - 14th - 6pts + 8 semi-final points
- 1938 - (England) London, Wembley Stadium - 11th - 5pts + 5 semi-final points

== Players cigarette cards ==
Atkinson is listed as number 2 of 50 in the 1930s Player's cigarette card collection.
