= Clem Mitchell =

Australian motorcycle speedway rider

- Born: 3 February 1908; Blyth, South Australia, Australia
- Died: 28 February 1995 (aged 87); Victoria, Australia
- Nationality: Australian

Career history
- 1930: Perry Barr
- 1930, 1932: Crystal Palace Glaziers
- 1932: Plymouth Tigers
- 1937: Harringay Tigers
- 1937–1938: New Cross Rangers
- 1948–1950: Edinburgh Monarchs

Individual honours
- 1937: Victorian State Champion

Team honours
- 1938: League champion

Clement Walter Mitchell (3 February 1908 – 28 February 1995) was an Australian international motorcycle speedway rider. He earned 29 international caps for the Australia national speedway team.

== Biography ==
Mitchell, born in Blyth, South Australia, was brought over to the UK in 1930 by Roger Frogley, before he started his British leagues career racing a couple of times for Birmingham Perry Barr. The Birmingham team folded, leaving Mitchell to join the Crystal Palace Glaziers during the 1930 Speedway Southern League season. He was named in the Crystal Palace team for 1931 but he chose to stay in Australia for the season.

In 1932, the northern and southern leagues merged to form the National League and Mitchell returned to UK shores arriving to race for Crystal Palace again. He failed to make it out of the reserves and joined Plymouth Tigers mid-season. Mitchell raced in Australia from 1933 to 1936 and was instrumental in setting up the debut's of Jack Milne and Cordy Milne in British speedway. Mitchell returned himself for the 1937 season, signing on with the Harringay Tigers before moving to New Cross Rangers the following season. He won the league title with New Cross in 1938.

After World War II, Mitchell joined Edinburgh Monarchs and spent fours seasons with the Scottish club from 1948 to 1952, before becoming their team manager.

== Family ==
Mitchell's brother Lindsay Gordon Mitchell also rode professional speedway.
