= Stan Greatrex =

British motorcycle speedway rider

- Born: 26 January 1911; Coventry, England
- Died: 9 October 1986 (aged 75); Worthing, West Sussex, England
- Nationality: British (English)

Career history
- 1931-1933: Coventry
- 1934-1939: New Cross Rangers

Team honours
- 1938: National League Champion
- 1934, 1937: London Cup Winner

Stanley James Greatrex (26 January 1911 – 9 October 1986), sometimes spelt Greatorex, was a professional motorcycle speedway rider in the 1930s who went on to become managing director of West Ham Hammers. He rode under the name Stan Greatrex.

== Speedway career ==
Greatrex was born in Coventry and gained his early speedway experience at the Coventry track, and rode for Coventry between 1930 and 1933. In 1931, he had a brief spell on loan with the Leicester Stadium team. He was a successful rider in the years leading up to World War II for New Cross Rangers, and captained them in 1939.

Greatrex was part of the England national speedway team in the 1936, 1938, and 1939 Test series against Australia and the 1937 series against an 'overseas' team. At retirement, he had earned five international caps for the England.

Greatrex had a motorcycle sales business in New Cross in the late 1930s.

During World War II, Greatrex gave up his two motor cycle showrooms to join the Royal Air Force, where he was an air gunner. He later joined the 287 Fighter Squadron, where he flew spitfires and then became a flight commander.

After the war, Greatrex became managing director at West Ham, working alongside Arthur Atkinson and worked at Morris Motors in Coventry.

== Players cigarette cards ==
Greatrex is listed as number 15 of 50 in the 1930s Player's cigarette card collection.
