= Alec Statham =

British motorcycle speedway rider

- Born: 30 May 1912; Coventry, England
- Died: 8 March 1977 (aged 64); Rugby, England
- Nationality: British (English)

Career history
- 1935, 1937-39: Harringay Tigers
- 1936: Southampton Saints
- 1946-47: Odsal Boomerangs
- 1948-50: Wimbledon Dons

Individual honours
- 1945: Northern Riders' Champion
- 1949: London Riders' Champion

Team honours
- 1936: Provincial League Champion
- 1936: Provincial Trophy Winner
- 1950: National Trophy Winner

Alec George Statham (30 May 1912 Coventry, England – 8 March 1977) was a Speedway rider who won the London Riders' Championship in 1949. He earned 22 international caps for the England national speedway team.

== Biography ==
Statham began grasstrack racing at the age of sixteen. He first rode in speedway as a novice at the Brandon track, going on to ride for Coventry, signed for Birmingham in 1932, and then Southampton, riding as a hobby with his garage business his main priority.

Statham rode for the Harringay Tigers in 1935 before dropping down a division to the Southampton Saints. He gave up racing, thinking he was not good enough to progress, but due to financial difficulties with his garage business in 1937 he returned to the National League with Harringay, soon rising to heat leader status. After the Second World War, he joined the Odsal Boomerangs in Bradford, captaining the team, before moving to the Wimbledon Dons for a record £2,000 transfer fee, repaying that with 336 points in the 1948 season. He won the 1949 London Riders' Championship.

Statham first rode in the England team in the 1938 test series against Australia, scoring 2 points in the first test at Belle Vue and 3 points at West Ham. He travelled to Australia for the 1938/9 series, scoring 2 points in the fourth test. It was in the post-war period when Statham became a leading rider for England, regularly selected between 1947 and 1949.

== World final appearances ==
- 1937 – (England) London, Wembley Stadium – 18th – 6 semi-final points
- 1938 – (England) London, Wembley Stadium – 7th – 13pts
