= Tommy Croombs =

British motorcycle speedway rider

- Born: 13 December 1906; New Malden, England
- Died: 15 October 1980 (aged 73); Bournemouth, England
- Nationality: British (English)

Career history
- 1929: Lea Bridge
- 1930–1939, 1947–1948: West Ham Hammers

Individual honours
- 1938: Northern Riders' Champion

Team honours
- 1937: National League Champion
- 1938: A.C.U. Cup Winner

Thomas Robert Croombs (13 December 1906 – 15 October 1980) was a speedway rider who finished third in the Star Riders' Championship in 1931, the forerunner to the Speedway World Championship.

== Career ==
Croombs was born in New Malden, Surrey, England.

Croombs rode for Lea Bridge in 1929 and moved onto the West Ham Hammers in 1930. He stayed with the Hammers until the end of the 1939 season when he retired. In 1947, he made a comeback, riding for West Ham, starting as reserve and then back as a full team member within six weeks.

At retirement, Croombs had earned 30 international caps for the England national speedway team.

When West Ham's track, West Ham Stadium was demolished, a road on the new development was named after Croombs.

== World final appearances ==
- 1937 – (England) London, Wembley Stadium – 16th – 8pts
- 1938 – (England) London, Wembley Stadium – 14th – 8pts

== Players cigarette cards ==
Croombs is listed as number 10 of 50 in the 1930s' Player's cigarette card collection.
