= Wimbledon Dons =

Motorcycle speedway team

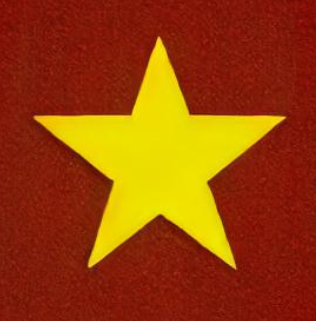

Club information
- Track address: Wimbledon Stadium; Plough Lane; Wimbledon; London
- Country: England
- Founded: 1928
- Closed: 2005

Club facts
- Colours: Yellow Star on Red
- Track size: 355 yards (325 m)

Major team honours
National League Champions	1954, 1955, 1956, 1958, 1959, 1960, 1961
National Trophy Winners	1938, 1950, 1951, 1953, 1956, 1959, 1960, 1962
KO Cup Winners	1968, 1969, 1970
London Cup Winners	1938, 1939, 1964, 1968, 1969, 1970, 1974, 1975, 1978, 1980, 1983, 1985
RAC Cup	1954
Britannia Shield	1959
Gauntlet Spring Gold Cup Winners	1979

The Wimbledon Dons were a professional motorcycle speedway team who operated from the Wimbledon Stadium, Plough Lane in London from 1929 until 1991 and 2002 until 2005. The team were seven times champions of Britain.

== History ==
=== Origins ===
The speedway track opened at Wimbledon Stadium during the pioneer days of speedway in the United Kingdom on the Bank holiday of 26 May 1928 with an open meeting. The stadium had been opened one year previous for greyhound racing and the speedway track was constructed inside the greyhound track.

The Wimbledon Dons were founder members of the 1929 Speedway Southern League and held their first home league fixture on 6 May against Birmingham Perry Barr.

=== 1930s ===
The Dons improved to a fourth place finish in 1930 and then finished 5th in 1931, struggling to match fellow London team, the Wembley Lions who dominated the league. Wimbledon signed some of the sports early stars, such as Jim Kempster, Dicky Case, Billy Lamont, Ray Tauscher, Vic Huxley and Claude Rye. Wimbledon were founder members of the National League in 1932 and achieved a runner-up spot behind Belle Vue Aces in the 1933 Speedway National League.

Following a woeful 1937 season team changes were made, with Benny Kaufman being brought in to support fellow American Wilbur Lamoreaux and Australian Eric Collins. The changes helped the Dons secure the club's first silverware with a National Trophy and London Cup double. Wimbledon were competing for the 1939 title and won the 1939 London Cup, but the season was suspended due to the outbreak of war.

=== 1940s ===
Wimbledon Stadium was closed during the Second World War but upon their reopening a record crowd of 28,000 attended and this was soon followed by new records, culminating in 42,000 with an estimated 10,000 more locked outside. Rider Norman Parker starred for the Dons, averaging over 10 in 1946 and 1947 and topping the Dons team averages every season from 1946 to 1949.

=== 1950s ===
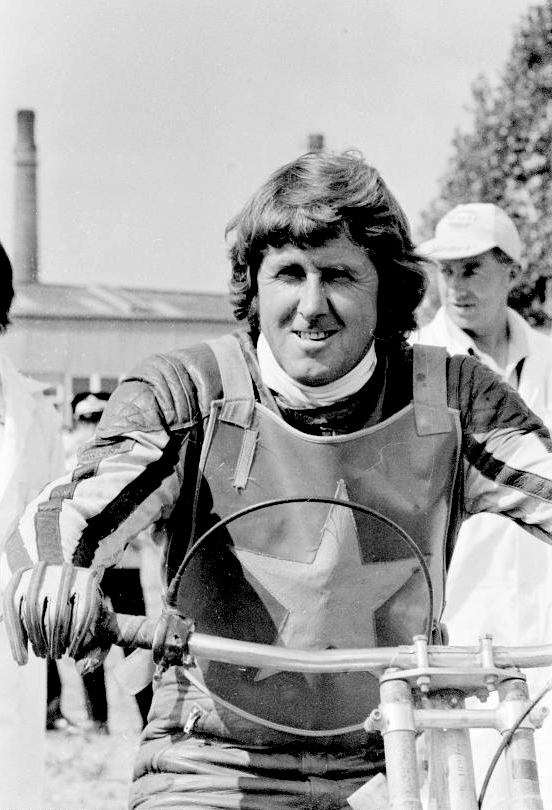
Barry Briggs

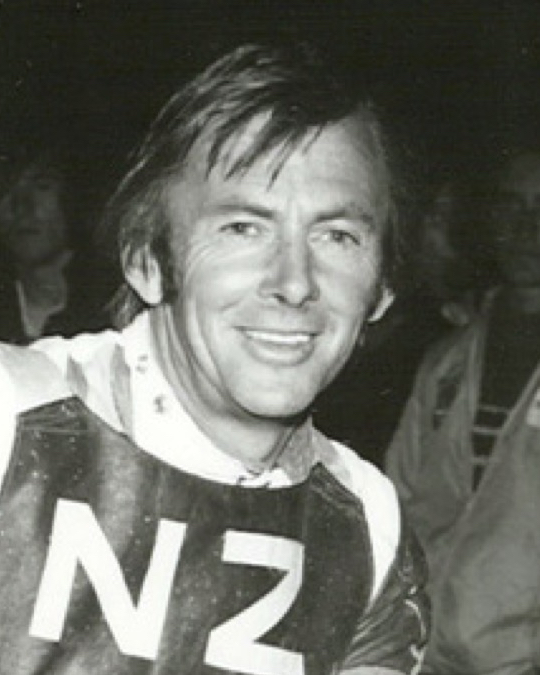
Ronnie Moore

The 1950s began well with the Dons winning their second National Trophy. Alec Statham, Cyril Brine and new signing Ronnie Moore also helped Wimbledon improve in the league. They repeated the success in 1951 but tragedy hit the 1952 season, when the Dons American rider Ernie Roccio was killed in a crash at West Ham Stadium.

After bouncing back with another National Trophy success in 1953, the team finally won the league title in 1954. Ronnie Moore and fellow New Zealanders, Geoff Mardon and Barry Briggs were almost unbeatable as a trio and despite losing Mardon in 1955 the Dons successfully defended their title. The golden era continued in 1956, as Wimbledon then achieved a third straight championship success and claimed the double by winning the National Trophy. Briggs, Ronnie Moore, Peter Moore, Ron How and Brine all contributed with significant averages.

Wimbledon were the envy of the other clubs during the 1950s and would claim two more titles (the first of four in a row) in 1958 and 1959. Despite such success promoter Ronnie Greene struggled to make a profit because attendances had decreased by 1959.

=== 1960s ===
The 1960 Speedway National League was a second successive double season and in 1961 Wimbledon won a fourth consecutive league title. Ronnie Moore, Brine and How remained at the club and were being supported by riders such as Bob Andrews, Gerry Jackson and Cyril Maidment.

The 1961 title would be the last time that the Dons would win the league but the club would win a National Trophy (1962), a London Cup (1964) and two Knockout Cups, the new name for the National Trophy (1968, 1969). The Dons number 1 riders during the period included Göte Nordin, Olle Nygren and Trevor Hedge. A major competition called the Internationale Wimbledon Internationale became a permanent fixture at the stadium from 1962.

=== 1970s ===
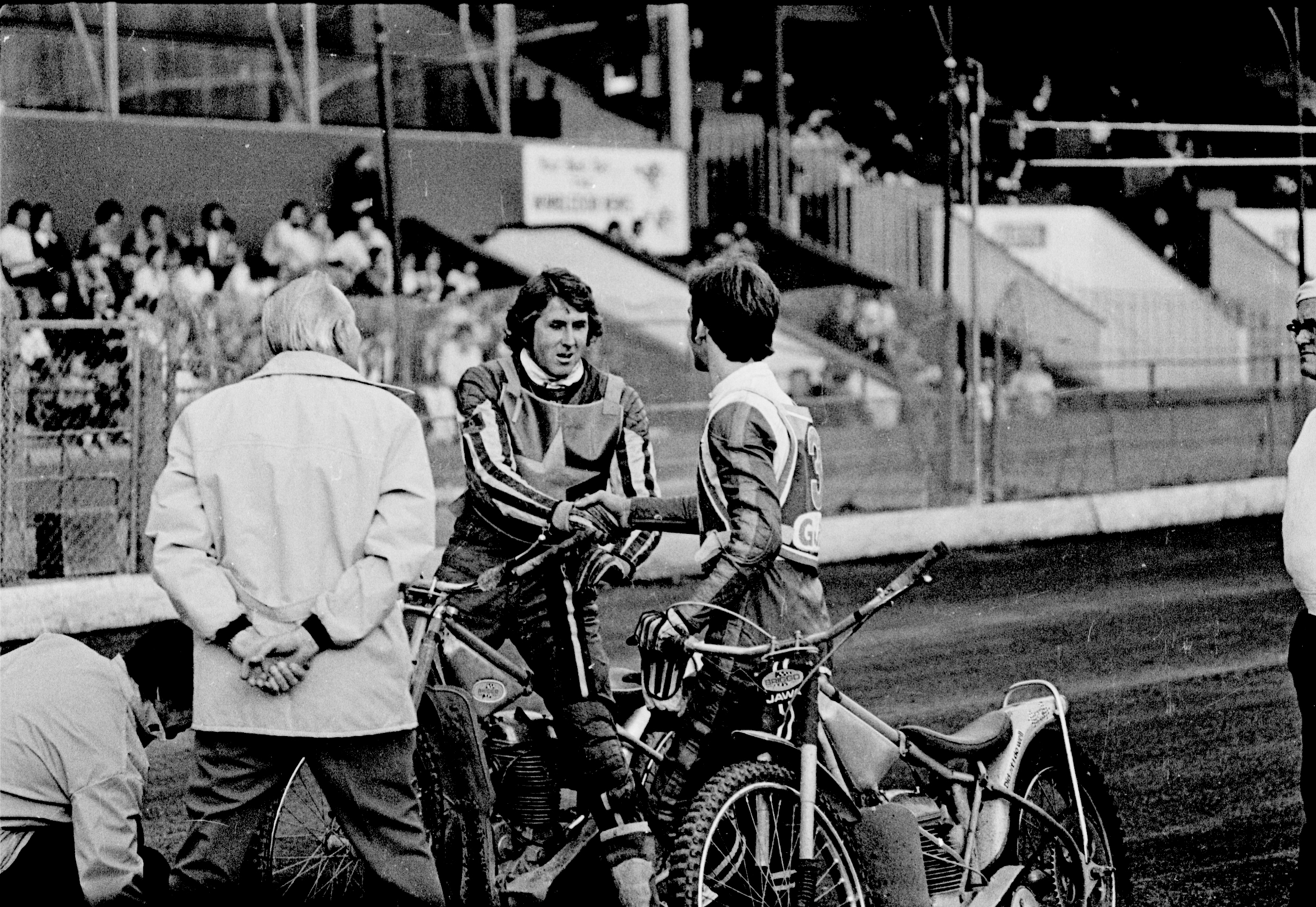
Wimbledon Dons captain Barry Briggs (centre) shaking hands with Oxford Rebels captain Gordon Kennett in 1975

The 1970s began brightly with the team securing a Knockout Cup and London Cup double, in addition to a second place finish in the league behind Belle Vue Aces. After 34 years in charge, Promoter Ronnie Greene retired after the 1970 season.

Unfortunately, following the retirement of Moore, the club began to decline and the success of the late 50s and early 60s was long forgotten. The best finish was a 4th place finish in 1978 and London Cup wins were now little compensation due to the lack of speedway teams left in the capital. On the rider front Barry Briggs returned but was past his best and the dynamic Swede Tommy Jansson was killed in a crash in 1976. Pole Edward Jancarz was brought in to replace Jansson in 1977 to support Larry Ross and Roger Johns.

=== 1980s ===
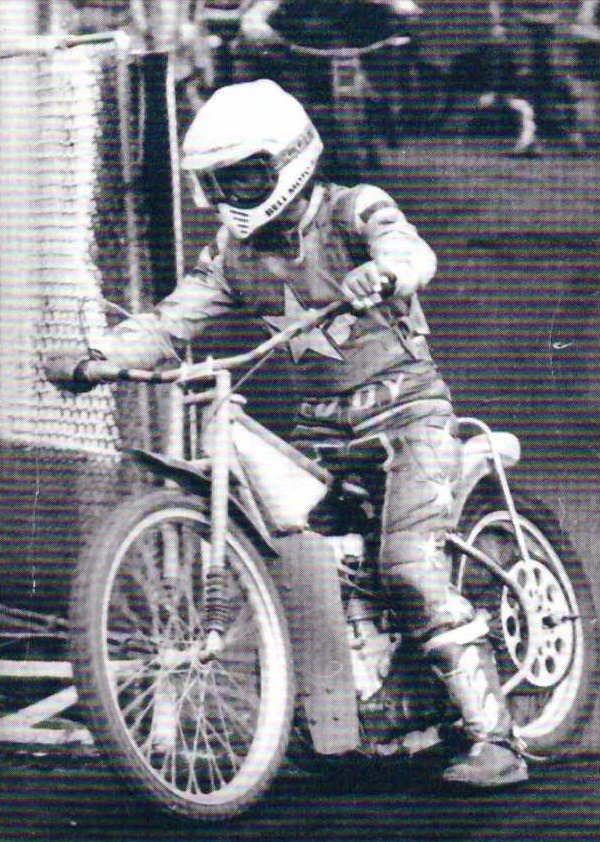
Jancarz in Dons colours

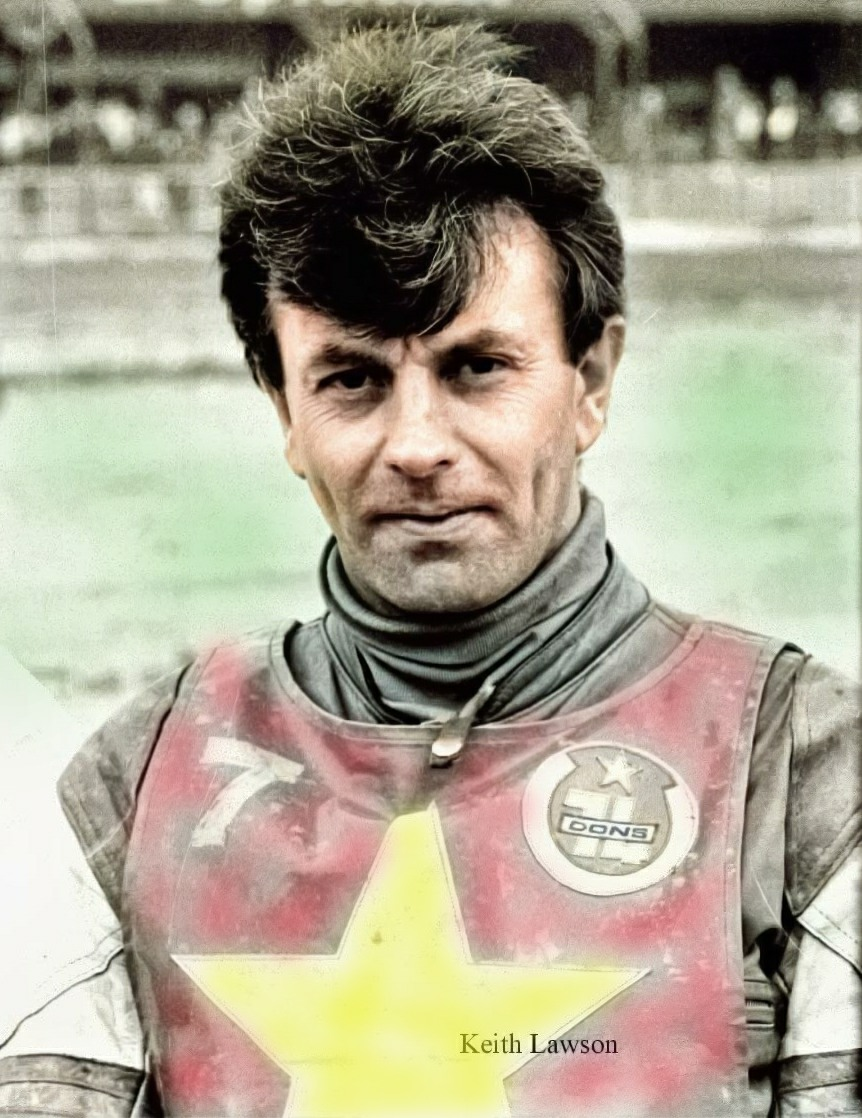
Reg Luckhurst in Dons colours

During the early 1980s Wimbledon found it hard to compete with the financial power of clubs such as Cradley Heath Heathens, despite recruiting riders Malcom Simmons and Dave Jessup and after the 1984 season the Dons dropped to the second tier National League for the first time in the club's history.

Roger Johns returned to the club for 1985 and Zimbabwean Mike Ferreira signed up but Wimbledon failed to live up to their favourites tag finishing 4th. Similar seasons ensued before the team managed a runner-up spot in 1989 behind Poole Pirates. Riders claiming the number 1 spot included Kevin Jolly, Ray Morton and Todd Wiltshire.

=== 1990s ===
Andy Grahame won the Riders' Championship as a Wimbledon rider in 1990 but the team could only finish 7th. The following season in 1991, it was announced that the Dons would return to the top tier of British speedway. They retained Grahame and brought in a new team including former rider John Davis. However, mid-way through the season attendance income failed to cover operating costs forcing co-promoter Don Scarff to relocate the team to Eastbourne.

=== 2000s ===
Having been defunct for eleven years, the team was reopened again in 2002 by Steve Ribbons & David Croucher in the third tier Conference League. The Dons ran for four seasons, culminating in the runner-up spot in the 2005 Speedway Conference League and winning the pairs for the second consecutive season. However, after the 2005 season, with Ian Perkin, Dingle Brown & Perry Attwood being joint promoters of the club, they were forced to close when Clive Feltham, the Managing Director of the stadium owners Greyhound Racing Association insisted on dramatically increasing the rent paid by the team to the stadium.

== Notable riders ==
- (England) Bob Andrews
- (England) Cyril Brine
- (New Zealand) Barry Briggs
- (Australia) Dicky Case
- (England) Billy Dallison
- (England) John Davis
- (Australia) Vic Duggan
- (England) Andy Grahame
- (England) Oliver Hart
- (England) Trevor Hedge
- (England) Ron How
- (Australia) Vic Huxley
- (England) Gerry Jackson
- (Poland) Edward Jancarz
- (Sweden) Tommy Jansson
- (England) Dave Jessup
- (England) Roger Johns
- (England) Kevin Jolly
- (United States) Benny Kaufman
- (England) Jim Kempster
- (England) Gus Kuhn
- (Australia) Billy Lamont
- (United States) Wilbur Lamoreaux
- (England) Reg Luckhurst
- (England) Cyril Maidment
- (New Zealand) Geoff Mardon
- (New Zealand) Ivan Mauger
- (Australia) Peter Moore
- (New Zealand) Ronnie Moore
- (England) Ray Morton
- (Finland) Kai Niemi
- (Sweden) Göte Nordin
- (Sweden) Olle Nygren
- (United States) Bobby Ott
- (England) Norman Parker
- (England) Geoff Pymar
- (England) Colin Richardson
- (New Zealand) Larry Ross
- (England) Claude Rye
- (England) Malcolm Simmons
- (United States) Ray Tauscher
- (Australia) Todd Wiltshire

== Season summary ==
Extended content

Year and league	Position	Notes
1929 Speedway Southern League	11th	
1930 Speedway Southern League	4th	
1931 Speedway Southern League	5th	
1932 Speedway National League	5th	
1933 Speedway National League	2nd	
1934 Speedway National League	5th	
1935 Speedway National League	7th	
1936 Speedway National League	4th	
1937 Speedway National League	7th	
1938 Speedway National League	4th	National Trophy winner, London Cup
1939 Speedway National League	2nd+	London Cup
1946 Speedway National League	4th	
1947 Speedway National League	3rd	
1948 Speedway National League	6th	
1949 Speedway National League	8th	
1950 Speedway National League	3rd	National Trophy winner
1951 Speedway National League	3rd	National Trophy winner
1952 Speedway National League	5th	
1953 Speedway National League	5th	National Trophy winner
1954 Speedway National League	1st	champions
1955 Speedway National League	1st	champions
1956 Speedway National League	1st	champions & National Trophy winner
1957 Speedway National League	3rd	
1958 Speedway National League	1st	champions
1959 Speedway National League	1st	champions & National Trophy winner
1960 Speedway National League	1st	champions & National Trophy winner
1961 Speedway National League	1st	champions
1962 Speedway National League	2nd	National Trophy winner
1963 Speedway National League	3rd	
1964 Speedway National League	6th	London Cup
1965 British League season	2nd	
1966 British League season	4th	
1967 British League season	11th	
1968 British League season	9th	Knockout Cup winners, London Cup
1969 British League season	3rd	Knockout Cup winners, London Cup
1970 British League season	2nd	Knockout Cup winners, London Cup
1971 British League season	10th	
1972 British League season	13th	
1973 British League season	12th	
1974 British League season	8th	London Cup
1975 British League season	9th	London Cup
1976 British League season	16th	
1977 British League season	9th	
1978 British League season	4th	London Cup
1979 British League season	9th	
1980 British League season	13th	London Cup
1981 British League season	16th	
1982 British League season	11th	
1983 British League season	6th	London Cup
1984 British League season	7th	
1985 National League season	4th	London Cup
1986 National League season	6th	
1987 National League season	7th	
1988 National League season	4th	
1989 National League season	2nd	
1990 National League season	7th	
1991 British League season	N/A	fixtures taken over by Eastbourne Eagles
2002 Speedway Conference League	11th	
2003 Speedway Conference League	9th	
2004 Speedway Conference League	7th	
2005 Speedway Conference League	2nd	

+2nd when league was suspended

== Honours ==
- National League champions: 1954, 1955, 1956, 1958, 1959, 1960, 1961
- National Trophy winners: 1938, 1950, 1951, 1953, 1956, 1959, 1960, 1962
- KO Cup winners: 1968, 1969, 1970
- London Cup winners: 1938, 1939, 1961, 1964, 1968, 1969, 1970, 1972, 1974, 1975, 1976, 1977, 1978, 1980, 1982, 1983, 1985
- RAC Cup winners: 1954
- Britannia Shield winners: 1959
- Gauntlet Spring Gold Cup winners: 1979
- Conference Pairs champions: 2004, 2005
