= Norman Parker (speedway rider) =

British motorcycle speedway rider (1908–1999)

- Parker in 1951
- Born: 14 January 1908; Birmingham, England
- Died: 27 April 1999 (aged 91); Towcester, England
- Nationality: British (English)

Career history
- 1929-1930: Coventry
- 1931-1932: Southampton Saints
- 1932-1933: Clapton Saints
- 1934-1936, 1938-1939: Harringay Tigers
- 1946-1953: Wimbledon Dons

Individual honours
- 1943, 1944: Northern Riders' Champion

Team honours
- 1950, 1951, 1953: National Trophy winner
- 1935: London Cup winner

Norman Parker (14 January 1908 – 27 April 1999) was an international speedway rider who rode in the inaugural Speedway World Championship in 1936 as a reserve. He earned 36 international caps for the England national speedway team.

== Career ==
Born in Birmingham, England, Parker joined Coventry in 1929, and remained there until 1933 when he moved on to join the Southampton Saints. He then moved to Clapton Saints and then the Harringay Tigers. He and his older brother Jack rode in the same teams until the outbreak of war. In 1934, Parker made his international debut for England.

After the war, Parker joined the Wimbledon Dons and was appointed captain. In 1948, he finished runner up in the Australian Championship. In 1949, he finished fourth in the Speedway World Championship and made his last World Final appearance in 1951.

Parker retired after the 1953 season and took an appointment as the Swindon Robins team manager.

== World final appearances ==
- 1936 - (England) London, Wembley Stadium - 18th - 1pt + 6 semi-final points
- 1949 - (England) London, Wembley Stadium - 4th - 10pts
- 1951 - (England) London, Wembley Stadium - 14th - 3pts
