= Morian Hansen =

Danish speedway rider

- Born: 10 January 1905; Frederikssund, Denmark
- Died: 21 February 1995 (aged 90)
- Nationality: Danish

Career history
- 1931, 1933: West Ham Hammers
- 1935-1937: Hackney Wick Wolves
- 1938: Bristol Bulldogs
- 1939: Wembley Lions

Team honours
- 1936: London cup winner

Jens Henning Fisker Hansen DFC GM (10 January 1905 in Frederikssund, Denmark – 21 February 1995), known popularly as Morian Hansen, was a motorcycle speedway rider from Denmark, who rode in the first ever Speedway World Championship Final in 1936.

== Career ==
Hansen's first speedway races were at Copenhagen in 1928. He first rode in the UK for the West Ham Hammers in 1931 on a two-month permit, returning two years later.

Hansen joined the Hackney Wick Wolves in 1935 and rode for the club for three years until the end of the 1937 season. He then moved onto the Bristol Bulldogs and Wembley Lions before the outbreak of World War II. He competed in the World Championship finals in 1936 and 1937.

Hansen had held a pilot's licence since 1935 and served in the Royal Air Force during WWII, rising to the rank of Squadron Leader.

== Family ==
Born to Lars Christian and Rasmine, his two brothers Baltzer Hansen and Kaj (Kalle) Hansen both followed him into speedway.

== Awards ==
During WWII Hansen was awarded -

- The Distinguished Flying Cross,
- The George Medal,
- The 1939-1945 Star,
- The Air Crew Europe Star,
- The Burma Star and
- The Defence Medal.

== World Final Appearances ==
- 1936 - (England) London, Wembley Stadium - 11th - 15pts
- 1937 - (England) London, Wembley Stadium - 11th - 15pts

== Players cigarette cards ==
Hansen is listed as number 18 of 50 in the 1930s Player's cigarette card collection.
