= Benny Kaufman =

American speedway rider (1911–1998)

- Born: March 14, 1911; New York
- Died: August 31, 1998; Pembroke Pines, Florida
- Nationality: American

Career history
- 1938: Wimbledon Dons
- 1939: Southampton Saints

Individual honours
- 1938: Speedway World Championship finalist
- 1937: North American champion

Team honours
- 1938: National Trophy Winner

Benjamin Kaufman known as Benny Kaufman (March 11, 1911 – August 31, 1998) was a speedway rider from the United States.

== Speedway career ==
Kaufman was a leading speedway rider in the late 1930s. He reached the final of the Speedway World Championship in the 1938 Individual Speedway World Championship.

Kaufman was the North American champion in 1937. and he rode in the top tier of British Speedway, riding for Wimbledon Dons in 1938.

== World Final Appearances ==
- 1938 - (England) London, Wembley Stadium - 9th - 12pts
