= Lionel Van Praag =

Australian speedway rider (1908–1987)

Lionel Van Praag GM
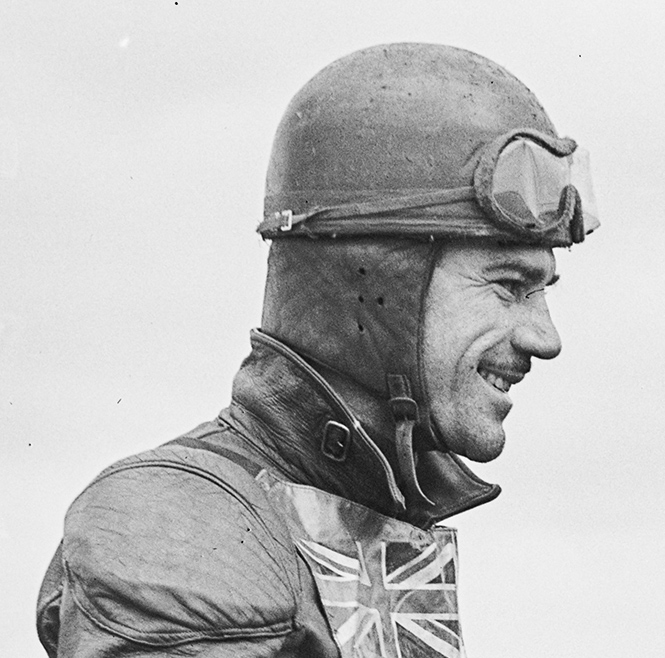
- Lionel van Praag, 9 February 1946, by Ray Olson
- Born: 17 December 1908; Sydney
- Died: 15 May 1987 (aged 78); Greenslopes, Queensland
- Nationality: Australian

Career history
- 1931–1939: Wembley Lions
- 1947: New Cross Rangers

Individual honours
- 1936: World Champion
- 1941: NSW State Champion
- 1947: Victorian State Champion

Team honours
- 1932: National League Champion
- 1931, 1932: National Trophy Winner
- 1931: Southern League Champion
- 1932, 1933, 1947: London Cup

Lionel Maurice Van Praag, GM (17 December 1908 – 15 May 1987) was an Australian motorcycle speedway champion, who won the inaugural Speedway World Championship in London on 10 September 1936. Van Praag's victory saw him established as Australia's first ever motorsport World Champion.

== 1931 UK Southern League Champion ==
In his first full season in British speedway, Van Praag was a member of the Wembley Lions team that won the last ever Southern League and the National Trophy in 1931.

== 1932 UK National League Champion ==
Van Praag won the inaugural National League title in 1932 with the Wembley Lions

== 1936 World Speedway Final ==
=== Circumstances ===
Eric Langton (left) congratulating Van Praag after winning the 1936 World Final Race off

Van Praag won the run-off for the Speedway World Championship against Eric Langton in 1936 in somewhat controversial circumstances. The Championship was decided by bonus points accumulated in previous rounds. Despite being unbeaten in the final, Bluey Wilkinson was not crowned Champion. Bonus points accumulated by Van Praag and Langton took them to the top of the standings and into a run-off (match race).

=== The Match Race ===
As they lined up at the tapes, Langton broke them which would ordinarily lead to disqualification. However, Van Praag stated he did not want to win the title by default and insisted that a race should take place. At the restart Langton made it to the first bend in front and led until the final bend on the last lap when Van Praag darted through the smallest of gaps to win by less than wheel length.

=== Controversy ===
Afterwards, controversial allegations were abound that the two riders had 'fixed' the match race, deciding between them that the first person to the first bend would win the race and the Championship and split the prize money; Langton led into the first bend but was overtaken by Van Praag. Van Praag reportedly paid Langton £50 "conscience money" after the race for going back on the agreement.

== Australia ==
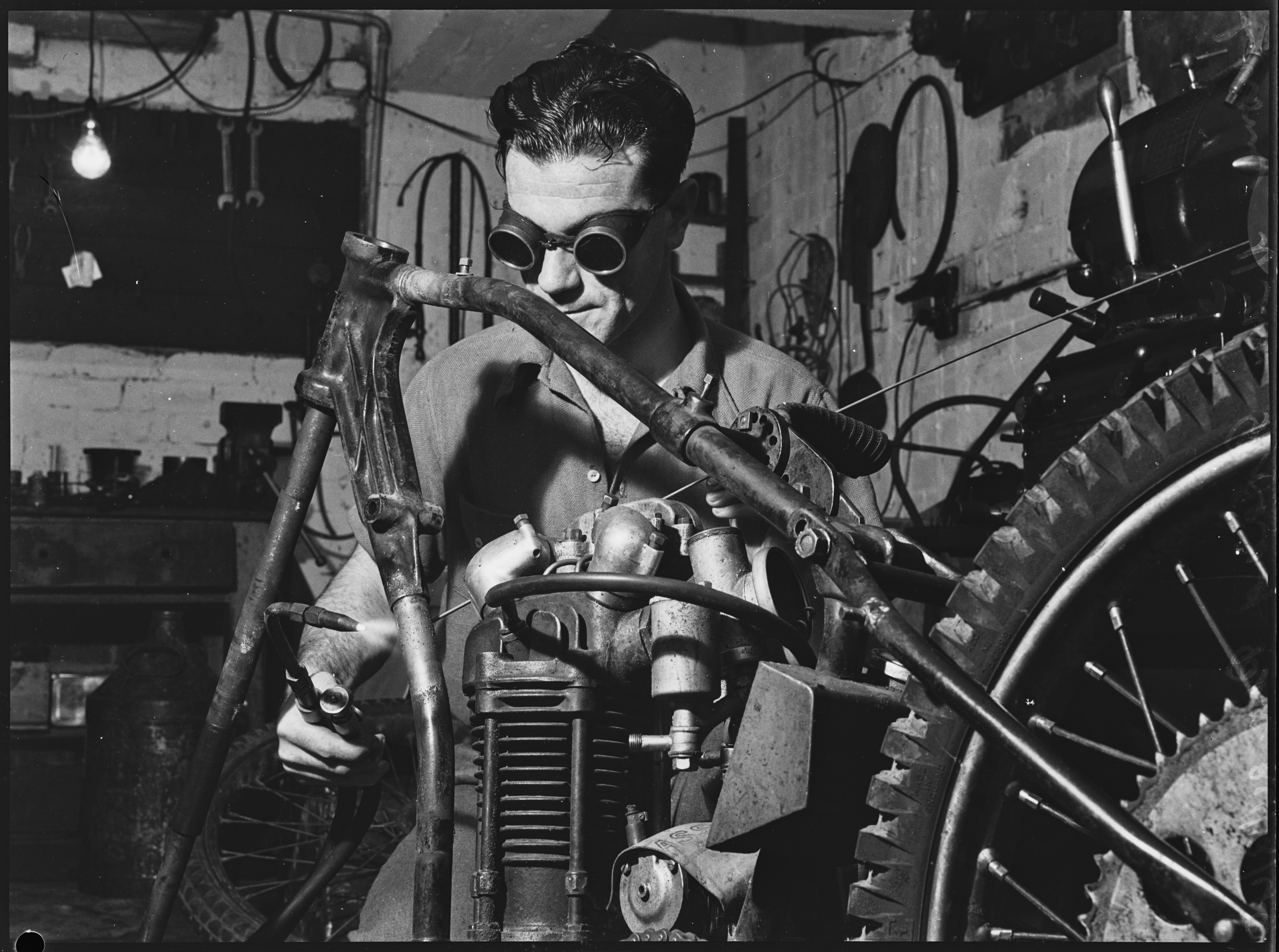
Speedway Champion Lionel Van Praag, Sydney, 1940

Van Praag was also a successful rider in his home country, though he never won the Australian Championship, finishing second in 1941 (3 laps), 1946 (3 laps), and 1947 (2 & 3 laps), as well as finishing third in 1940 (3 laps). He won the NSW State Championship in 1941 at the Sydney Sports Ground and the Victorian Championship in 1947.

Van Praag also represented Australia in test matches at home against England on numerous occasions at tracks around the country including the Sydney Showground, Sydney Sports Ground, Wayville Showground (Adelaide), Claremont Speedway (Perth) and the Exhibition Speedway in Melbourne.

== World Final appearances ==
- 1936 – (United Kingdom) London, Wembley Stadium – Winner – 14pts plus 12 bonus pts (won run-off)
- 1937 – (United Kingdom) London, Wembley Stadium – 7th – 6pts + 11 bonus pts
- 1938 – (United Kingdom) London, Wembley Stadium – 4th – 11pts + 7 bonus pts

== World War II ==
Van Praag was awarded the George Medal for bravery during World War II, when a Royal Australian Air Force Douglas DC-2, in which he was second pilot was shot down, by two Japanese aircraft over the Sumba Strait in Indonesia. Van Praag, a sergeant at the time, and the aircraft captain, Flying Officer Noel Webster helped two colleagues—one semi-conscious and the other a non-swimmer—to shore after spending thirty hours in the water during which they had to fight off several shark attacks. After the war, Van Praag participated in one more speedway championship, but retired in 1950 to concentrate on his career as a pilot.

Van Praag also appeared in the 1933 British film Money for Speed which starred John Loder, Ida Lupino, Cyril McLaglen and Moore Marriott. Ginger Lees, Frank Varey and speedway promoter Johnnie Hoskins also featured.

== Personal life ==
Van Praag was Jewish.

In 1990, Van Praag was inducted into the Sport Australia Hall of Fame.

In 2008, Van Praag was inducted into the Australian Speedway Hall of Fame.

== Legacy ==
In 2000, the Australian Capital Territory Place Names Committee named a street, Van Praag Circuit (ten weeks later renamed Van Praag Place), after him.

== Players cigarette cards ==
Van Praag is listed as number 45 of 50 in the 1930s Player's cigarette card collection.
