= Eric Chitty =

Canadian motorcycle racer (1909–1990)

- Eric Chitty
- Born: 28 April 1909; Toronto, Ontario, Canada
- Died: 23 December 1989 (aged 80); Pinellas, Florida, US

Career history
- 1936-1939, 1946-1951, 1953: West Ham Hammers

Individual honours
- 1934: Canadian Champion
- 1938: London Riders' Champion
- 1942: Northern Riders' Champion

Team honours
- 1937: National League Champion
- 1938: ACU Cup Winner

Eric Stephenson Chitty (28 April 1909 – 23 December 1989) was a Canadian speedway rider who won the London Riders' Championship in 1938.

== Early days ==
Chitty was born in Toronto, Ontario, Canada in 1909. Before taking up speedway he worked as an electrical engineer.

Chitty started speedway racing in 1930 in Detroit, Chicago and New York City in the United States, where he was noticed in 1934 by Johnnie Hoskins. In 1935, he came to the UK for a trial with the West Ham Hammers. He was not successful in his trial and was looking for other employment when the West Ham promoter Hoskins gave him another chance five months later, which he took. He was offered a contract by the Hammers. A broken collarbone in 1936 caused a long layoff, and he returned in 1937, scoring moderately well. The 1938 season saw a considerable improvement in his racing, Chitty winning the Opening Cup and the London Riders' Championship, both at New Cross. Chitty also served for a time as chairman of the Speedway Riders' Association.

== World Championship ==
Chitty qualified for the World Final held at Wembley Stadium in London in 1937, finishing 12th with 15 points. He failed to qualify in 1938 but qualified again for the World Final in 1939. Unfortunately the 1939 Final was cancelled due to the outbreak of World War II.

== Wartime racing ==
1937 illustration

During the war years, Chitty raced at Belle Vue in Manchester, which was the only track that ran all through the war. He won the unofficial British Individual Championship in 1940, 1941 and 1942, the Belle Vue Grand Prix, the Northern Championship and the Hundred Guineas Trophy all in 1942. He also won the all English Best Pairs Championship in 1941 with Ron Johnson and 1943 with Fred Tuck. In 1944, he won the National Trophy and also in 1944 he won the British Empire Best Pairs with Ron Clark. In the Winter of 1945/46, Chitty captained the ENSA team that toured Germany.

== After the war ==
In 1946, Chitty rejoined West Ham and was made team captain, reaching the finals of the British Riders Championship that year. He was always the center of entertainment, often singing to the crowd and once even raced a cheetah. He retired in 1952.

== World Final appearances ==
- 1937 – (England) London, Wembley Stadium – 12th – 4pts + 11 Semi-final pts
- 1939 – (England) London, Wembley Stadium - Event cancelled due to World War II

== Players cigarette cards ==
Chitty is listed as number 7 of 50 in the 1930s Player's cigarette card collection.
