= Frank Varey =

British motorcycle speedway rider (1908–1988)

- Born: 31 March 1908; Eldwick, England
- Died: 8 February 1988 (aged 79); Sheffield, England
- Nickname: El Diablo Rojo (The Red Devil)
- Nationality: British (English)

Career history
- 1930–1939: Belle Vue Aces

Individual honours
- 1944: British Wartime Champion

Team honours
- 1933, 1934, 1935, 1936: National League Champion
- 1930, 1931: Northern League Champion
- 1933, 1934, 1935, 1936: National Trophy winner
- 1931: Northern KO Cup winner
- 1934, 1935, 1936, 1937: A.C.U. Cup winner
- 1939: British Speedway Cup winner

Frank Varey (31 March 1908 – 8 February 1988) was a former international speedway rider who featured in the Speedway World Championship finals in 1937 and 1938. He also featured in two Star Riders' Championships, the forerunner to the World Championship, in 1932 and 1933. He earned 21 international caps for the England national speedway team. He was born in Eldwick and died in Sheffield.

== Career summary ==
=== Rider ===
Varey began his speedway career competing in open meetings in 1928 before signing for the Belle Vue Aces who had joined the newly formed Northern League in 1929. Varey began succeeding quickly but had a reputation of being a hard, uncompromising rider which often led him to disciplinary problems with speedway authorities, confrontations and occasional scuffles with other riders and on several occasions needing police escorts from stadiums after on-track action upset the home fans at other tracks.

During the winter of 1929–1930, Varey rode in meetings in Argentina, where the local fans gave him the nickname of El Diablo Rojo (The Red Devil) which further established his tough image even further.

Varey was very successful at Belle Vue. After being made captain in 1931 following the retirement of his friend and rival Arthur Franklyn, the team won the National League Championship four seasons in a row from 1933 to 1936 and were leading in the 1939 season until it was abandoned due to the outbreak of World War II. The Aces also won the National Trophy in those same four seasons.

Varey was selected to ride for England in the first ever Ashes Test Match series against Australia and was awarded the captaincy in the test held at Belle Vue.

Varey continued to ride during the war and in 1944 won the British Wartime Championship.

=== Promoter ===
1937 cigarette card

At the end of 1945, Varey decided to retire from racing and began promoting speedway at the Owlerton Stadium in Sheffield, staying as promoter of the Sheffield Tigers until 1950 before a spell promoting the Edinburgh Monarchs. Varey restarted speedway at Sheffield in 1960 in the Provincial League and remained until ill health forced him to relinquish control.

Varey returned to Belle Vue as team manager following the death of Dent Oliver the previous year but despite ongoing health problems he still helped with track preparation at Sheffield.

Varey died in February 1988.

== World Final Appearances ==
- 1937 - (England) London, Wembley Stadium - 15th - 3pts + 8 semi-final points
- 1938 - (England) London, Wembley Stadium - 17th - 0pts + 4 semi-final points

== Players cigarette cards ==
Varey is listed as number 46 of 50 in the 1930s Player's cigarette card collection.
