= Bluey Wilkinson =

Australian speedway rider (1911–1940)

- Born: 27 August 1911; Millthorpe, New South Wales, Australia
- Died: 27 July 1940 (aged 28); Bondi, New South Wales, Australia

Career history
- 1929-1938: West Ham Hammers

Individual honours
- 1938: World Champion
- 1935, 1938, 1938 (3 & 4 Lap): Australian Champion
- 1935, 1938, 1939: NSW State Champion
- 1932: Dirt Track Championnat du Monde
- 1938: Scottish Champion
- 1938: Tom Farndon Memorial winner

Team honours
- 1937: National League Champion
- 1937: Coronation Gold Cup Best Pairs
- 1938: ACU Cup

Arthur George "Bluey" Wilkinson (27 August 1911 – 27 July 1940) was an Australian speedway rider. Wilkinson was Speedway World Champion in 1938 after narrowly missing out on winning the inaugural Championship in 1936.

== Early life ==
Born in Millthorpe, New South Wales, Wilkinson was nicknamed "Bluey" because of his red hair (an Australian custom). At the age of four, Bluey's family moved to Bathurst, New South Wales, which he really considered to be his home town. He was working as a butcher boy when speedway first started at the Bathurst Sports Ground in 1928. It was love at first sight for Wilkinson and he promptly gave up a promising rugby league career and invested his savings in a battered old belt driven Rudge.

== Career ==
On the Rudge, Wilkinson wasn't a world-beater, but when Sydney and international star rider Lionel Van Praag came to Bathurst he loaned Wilkinson one of his spare bikes. In a battle of future World Champions, Wilkinson defeated Van Praag in a match race and his talent was recognised. He upgraded his machinery and the results came with it.

In 1929, Wilkinson headed for England in an effort to get noticed by rich Speedway clubs. He rode in the lower divisions for three seasons before he was offered a contract by the West Ham Hammers and stayed with the London-based club until 1939.

Wilkinson won the Dirt Track Championnat du Monde (an early version of the Speedway World Championship and rival of the Star Riders' Championship) at Stade Buffalo in Paris during 1932. The following year he went on to finish third in the Star Riders' Championship in 1933.

Wilkinson continued to return home to Australia to race in the Australian season, usually October through April. 1935 saw him win the Australian Championship at the Sydney Showground. He would win the title again in 1938 at the 509m long Showground, winning both the three lap and four lap titles and on both occasions defeating Wilbur Lamoreaux of the United States.

At the inaugural Speedway World Championship Final at London's Empire (Wembley) Stadium in 1936, Wilkinson was undefeated to score a 15-point maximum. However, as the championship also counted bonus points from the Semi-finals, Wilkinson finished with a total of 25 points, one behind fellow Aussie Lionel Van Praag and Englishman Eric Langton. Van Praag won a runoff from Langton with Wilkinson credited as finishing the Final in third place.

In 1937, Wilkinson won the National League with the Hammers and in 1938 he won the ACU Cup with the Hammers. However the pinnacle of his career was becoming World Champion in 1938 at Wembley Stadium after finishing third in the inaugural Championship in 1936. He was unlucky not to win the crown in 1936 as he was unbeaten in five races in the final held at Wembley, but was relegated to third place behind winner Lionel Van Praag and England's Eric Langton under a 'bonus points' system which operated during qualifying rounds.

Wilkinson's 1938 championship win was considered a gutsy effort after he had actually broken his left collarbone in a meeting for West Ham the night before the World Final. Determined not to miss the final, Wilkinson had the Tottenham Hotspur club doctor put his arm and shoulder in plaster. He ignored the pain he was in to win his first four rides before finishing a safe second in his fifth and last to clinch the World Championship before a crowd of 95,000.

Wilkinson retired from riding in 1939 to become the promoter at the Sheffield Speedway.

During his career, Wilkinson also rode for Australia in test matches against England and the United States. He scored a maximum 18 points in each of the five Tests against England staged in Australia in the 1937/38 season, a feat he failed to duplicate the following season by only a single point.

Wilkinson was inducted into the Australian Speedway Hall of Fame in 2008.

== World Final Appearances ==
1937 cigarette card

- 1936 - London, Wembley Stadium - 3rd - 25pts
- 1938 - London, Wembley Stadium - Winner - 22pts

== Death ==
After being involved in dozens of spectacular crashes during his speedway career and walking away from them all, Wilkinson was killed in a road accident in the Sydney suburb of Bondi on 27 July 1940. Riding a motorcycle with his wife Muriel as pillion, he was struck by a lorry which had swerved to avoid a car. He was killed almost instantly with a fractured skull. Muriel survived the accident physically with only little more than a few cuts and bruises.

== Players cigarette cards ==
Wilkinson is listed as number 48 of 50 in the 1930s Player's cigarette card collection.
