= Cordy Milne =

American speedway rider (1914–1978)

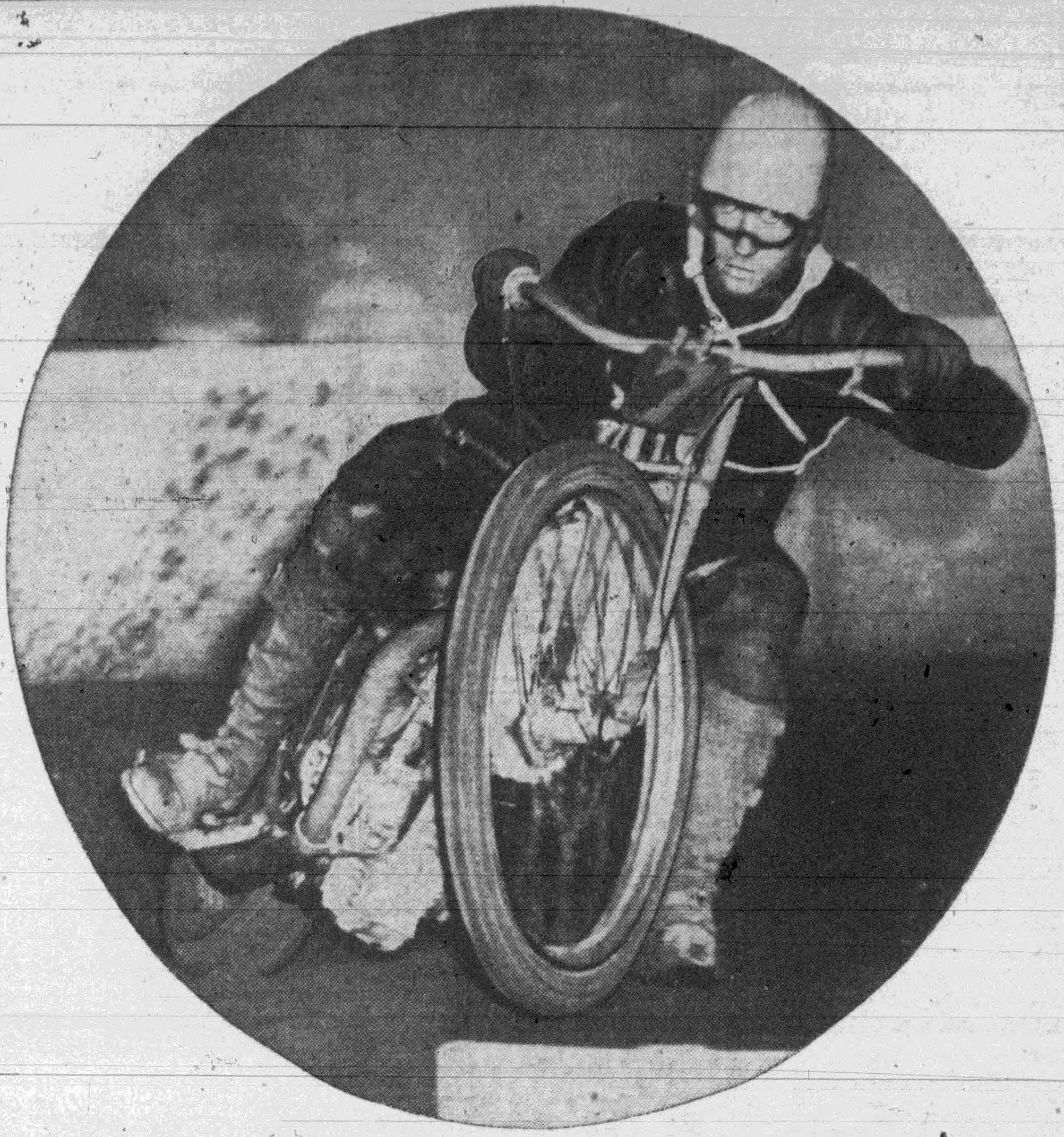
- Milne, circa 1942
- Born: April 14, 1914; Buffalo, New York, United States
- Died: October 15, 1978 (aged 64); Los Angeles, United States

Career history
- 1936-1937: Hackney Wick Wolves
- 1938: Bristol Bulldogs
- 1939: Southampton Saints

Individual honours
- 1934, 1935, 1947: AMA National Speedway Champion
- 1940 (3 Laps): Australian Champion

Team honours
- 1936: London Cup

Corydon Clark Milne (April 14, 1914 – October 15, 1978) was an American international motorcycle speedway rider who finished third in the 1937 Speedway World Championship final, behind his brother Jack and second placed Wilbur Lamoreaux. Corydon rose under the name Cordy Milne and all three riders came from Pasadena, California.

== Early life ==
Milne was born in Buffalo, New York, but his family moved to Pasadena, California, while he was still young. While working as a messenger deliver boy for Western Union, he saved his money and bought a motorcycle, converting it to a speedway bike.

By the early 1930s, Milne had started to earn some decent money in racing. His brother Jack decided that if he and his brother raced and shared expenses, they could earn a living from the sport. Jack sold his service station and purchased a pair of Comerford-JAP Speedway racing machines from England. Milne married famed burlesque dancer Lili St. Cyr in 1936. They later divorced, but the year is unknown.

== Career ==
Milne won his first American titles in 1934 and 1935. After World War II, he returned to win the U.S. title again in 1947 and 1948.

The Milne brothers came over to England, where speedway was very popular, after receiving help from Clem Mitchell. Cordy signed up to ride for the Hackney Wick Wolves, Jack for the New Cross Lambs. They became celebrities, appearing on trading cards and being featured in advertisements for a variety of products. He took his girlfriend, Marie Van Schaack, to England with him where they married, in July, 1936. She enjoyed her newfound fame as Cordy's wife and loved the glamorous lifestyle. She subsequently divorced Milne and began her life as Lili St. Cyr, a world-famous burlesque artist.

Milne reached the final of the Speedway World Championship three times, never finishing lower than sixth place and was in first place after the semi-finals in 1939 when World War II broke out and the final was never run. He returned to Pasadena with his brother and opened a bicycle shop with $4,000 from their racing earnings. The business grew to include a motorcycle dealership and later the Milnes expanded to a major car dealership in the Los Angeles area.

Cordy also toured Australia alongside his brother Jack and fellow American Wilbur Lamoreaux on occasions during the mid-late 1930s and early 1940s. Cordy won the 1940 Australian Championship at the famous Sydney Showground Speedway after having finished second in 1938 in the 5 Lap Championship at the Camden Motordrome in Adelaide. He also represented the USA in test matches against the Australians. Cordy married his second wife, Australian beauty, Verna Ross. He met Verna when he was in hospital after a riding accident. She was visiting her 12-year-old brother, Kevin in the next bed. He and Verna returned to live in the US. They had five daughters.

After the war, the brothers helped revive Speedway racing in Southern California, and Milne won his last two American National titles.

In 1998, Milne was inducted into the AMA Motorcycle Hall of Fame.

== World Final Appearances ==
1937 cigarette card

- 1936 - (England) London, Wembley Stadium - 4th - 20pts
- 1937 - (England) London, Wembley Stadium - 3rd - 23pts
- 1938 - (England) London, Wembley Stadium - 6th - 15pts

== Players cigarette cards ==
Milne is listed as number 30 of 50 in the 1930s Player's cigarette card collection.
