= Jack Milne (speedway rider) =

American speedway rider (1907–1995)

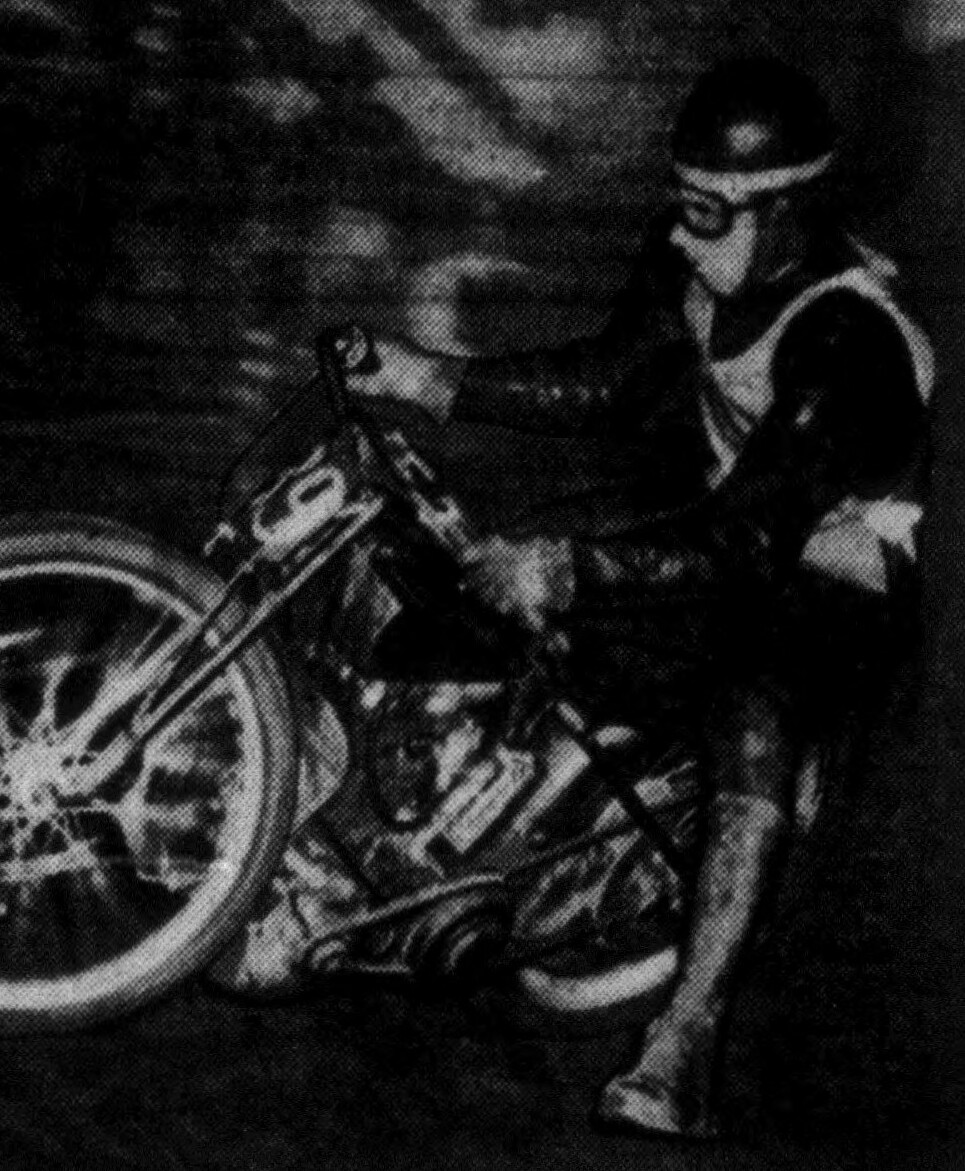
- Milne, circa 1946
- Born: 4 June 1907; Buffalo, New York, U.S.
- Died: 6 December 1995 (aged 88); Los Angeles, U.S.

Career history
- 1936–1939: New Cross Tamers/Rangers

Individual honours
- 1937: World Champion
- 1936: Tom Farndon Memorial winner
- 1937 (3 Lap): Australian Champion
- 1937: NSW State Champion
- 1937, 1939: London Riders' Champion

Team honours
- 1938: National League Champion
- 1937: London Cup

John Walter Milne (4 June 1907 – 6 December 1995) was an international speedway rider. He became the first American to win a motorcycling world championship when he won the Speedway World Championship in 1937 (defeating brother Cordy Milne into third place). Milne finished as runner-up in the World Championship in 1938.

== Early life ==
Milne's family moved to Pasadena, California while he was still young. By the early 1930s, Cordy Milne had started to earn a decent amount of money in racing. Jack decided that if he and his brother raced and shared expenses, they could make a living from the sport. Jack sold his service station and purchased a pair of Comerford-JAP Speedway racing machines from England.

== Career ==
The Milne brothers came over to England, where speedway was very popular, after receiving help from Clem Mitchell. Cordy signed up to ride for the Hackney Wick Wolves, Jack for the New Cross Tamers. They became celebrities, appearing on trading cards and being featured in advertisements for a variety of products. Milne won the London Riders' Championship in 1937 and 1939.

Jack Milne, Cordy Milne and fellow American Wilbur Lamoreaux also toured Australia on many occasions. In 1936/37, they were joined by Earl Farrand, Byrd McKinney, Pete Colman and Garland Johnson in representing the USA in test matches against the Australians. Jack Milne also won the 1937 Australian 3 Lap Championship as well as the 1937 New South Wales State Championship at the famous Sydney Showground Speedway.

Milne reached the final of the Speedway World Championship three times, never finishing lower than tenth place and was in fifth place after the semi-finals in 1939 when World War II broke out and the final was never run. He returned to Pasadena with his brother and opened a bicycle shop with $4,000 from their racing earnings. The business grew to include a motorcycle dealership and later the Milnes expanded to a major car dealership in the Los Angeles area.

== Legacy ==
1937 cigarette card

After the war, the brothers helped revive American Speedway racing in Southern California including Costa Mesa Speedway which has been operating continuously since 1969 to this day, and Milne won his last two American National titles.

As a former Speedway World Champion and previous winner at Wembley Stadium Jack Milne was a special guest at the 1981 World Final at Wembley Stadium, the last to be held at the famous venue. There he saw Bruce Penhall became the first American to win the World Championship since Milne had done so in 1937 breaking a drought of 43 years for American riders.

In 1998, Jack Milne was inducted into the AMA Motorcycle Hall of Fame. In the same year, the Jack Milne Cup was inaugurated to honour the life of the former World Champion; it is still held annually at Costa Mesa Speedway.

== World Final appearances ==
- 1936 - (England) London, Wembley Stadium - 10th - 15pts
- 1937 - (England) London, Wembley Stadium - Winner - 28pts
- 1938 - (England) London, Wembley Stadium - 2nd - 21pts

== Players cigarette cards ==
Milne is listed as number 31 of 50 in the 1930s Player's cigarette card collection.
