= Wilbur Lamoreaux =

American speedway rider (1907–1963)

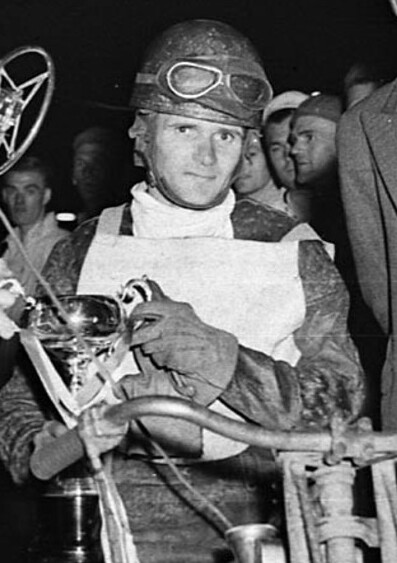
- Lamoreaux in 1937
- Born: 26 February 1907; Roseville, Illinois
- Died: 11 May 1963 (aged 56)
- Nickname: Lammy
- Nationality: American

Career history
- 1937-1939: Wimbledon Dons
- 1948: Wembley Lions
- 1949: Birmingham Brummies

Individual honours
- 1938: NSW State Champion
- 1939: Scottish Champion
- 1946: AMA National Champion

Team honours
- 1938, 1948: National Trophy
- 1938, 1939, 1948: London Cup

Wilbur Leonard Lamoreaux (born 26 February 1907 in Roseville, Illinois, United States - died 11 May 1963) was an international motorcycle speedway rider who qualified for three Speedway World Championship finals and never finished lower than fifth place.

== Early life ==
At an early age his family moved to Pasadena, California. Lamoreaux became a motorcycle enthusiast and he finally convinced his mother to allow him to buy an Indian Scout in 1923, when he was only 16 years old. He became a motorcycle messenger for Western Union. While working at Western Union, he met fellow Pasadenans, brothers Jack and Cordy Milne.

== Career ==
Nicknamed 'Lammy', Lamoreaux competed in California in the mid-1930s, and rode for the Wimbledon Dons from 1937 until the outbreak of World War II. He won the Scottish Championship in 1939. During World War II, he promoted speedway in the US, and in 1946 won the American National Championship in Los Angeles. After the war, he was persuaded by Sir Arthur Elvin not to retire and rode for them Wembley Lions in 1948. In 1949, he spent a season with the Birmingham Brummies, and also qualified for the Speedway World Championship, ten years after his last appearance and forty two years of age, was the oldest competitor. He finished in fifth place, although an engine failure cost him his third rostrum finish in three finals.

Lamoreaux also rode in Australia during his career, finishing second to 1938 World Champion Bluey Wilkinson in both the 1938 Three and Four Lap Australian Championships at the Sydney Showground Speedway. In 1938, Lamoreaux also won the NSW State Championship at the Sydney Showground. He also represented the USA in test matches against the Australians at other tracks around the country including the Sydney Sports Ground and Olympic Park in Melbourne.

== World Final appearances ==
- 1937 - (England) London, Wembley Stadium - 2nd - 25pts
- 1938 - (England) London, Wembley Stadium - 3rd - 20pts
- 1949 - (England) London, Wembley Stadium - 5th - 9pts
