= 1934 Speedway National League =

British speedway league season

- League: National League Division One
- No. of competitors: 9
- Champions: Belle Vue Aces
- National Trophy: Belle Vue Aces
- A.C.U Cup: Belle Vue Aces
- London Cup: New Cross Lambs
- Highest average: Eric Langton

The 1934 National League Division One was the sixth season of motorcycle speedway in Great Britain. It was also the first time that a second division/tier of racing was introduced following the creation of a reserves league.

== Summary ==
Birmingham Bulldogs (formerly Hall Green) and Lea Bridge rejoined the league.

Sheffield dropped out and most of their team joined Lea Bridge. Clapton Saints, who rode at Lea Bridge's stadium in the previous season relocated and raced as Harringay Tigers. Crystal Palace relocated to New Cross under the promotion of Fred Mockford, with the reason being that Mockford believed attendances would be larger.

Coventry and Nottingham also dropped out.

Lea Bridge had their licence revoked by the Speedway Control Board in late July and were relocated to Walthamstow Stadium, riding as the Walthamstow Wolves, who took on their last ten fixtures.

Belle Vue Aces won their second consecutive double of national title and Knockout Cup. They also completed the treble by winning the A.C.U Cup. Eric Langton of Belle Vue Aces finished with the highest average.

== National League Final table ==
Pos	Team	PL	W	D	L	Pts
1	Belle Vue Aces	32	27	0	5	54
2	Wembley Lions	32	26	0	6	52
3	New Cross Lambs	32	21	0	11	42
4	West Ham Hammers	32	16	1	15	33
5	Wimbledon Dons	32	16	0	16	32
6	Harringay Tigers	32	14	1	17	29
7	Birmingham Bulldogs	32	9	0	23	18
8	Plymouth Tigers	32	8	2	22	18
9	Lea Bridge + Walthamstow Wolves	32	5	0	27	10*

- Lea Bridge scored 8 points from 22 matches, Walthamstow scored 2 from 10

== Fixtures & results ==
=== A fixtures ===
Home \ Away	BV	BIR	HAR	LBW	NC	PLY	WEM	WH	WIM
Belle Vue		38–16	33–21	33–21	26–25	36–0	26–28	32–19	34–19
Birmingham	21–33		22–32	31–23	28–25	31–23	20–34	32–22	26–27
Harringay	21–33	28–24		35–18	20–33	35–15	26–28	32–21	26–28
Lea Bridge/Walthamstow	18–32	31–22	19–33		18–33	28–25	23–31	23–29	23–31
New Cross	31–21	26–24	29–25	38–16		31–22	32–21	24–29	30–24
Plymouth	18–36	32–20	28–26	29–22	21–32		22–32	27–27	28–25
Wembley	23–31	35–19	23–31	35–17	33–20	40–14		35–17	31–23
West Ham	22–32	27–26	30–23	33–21	27–26	40–11	24–30		20–33
Wimbledon	21–33	36–17	31–23	31–23	29–24	33–20	21–32	37–15	

Legend: Blue = home team win; Yellow = draw; Red = away team win.

=== B fixtures ===
Home \ Away	BV	BIR	HAR	LBW	NC	PLY	WEM	WH	WIM
Belle Vue		42–11	36–18	40–14	28–26	41–12	35–19	30–24	38–16
Birmingham	12–40		21–33	26–26	30–23	39–14	22–32	31–23	32–22
Harringay	21–33	32–20		34–20	26.5–27.5	40–14	22–32	33–20	23–29
Lea Bridge/Walthamstow	17–36	29–25	25–29		23–30	22–31	22–32	21–32	29–25
New Cross	20–34	33–21	39–14	36–17		42–9	28–26	29–25	8–16
Plymouth	31–22	30–23	26–26	25–28	23–31		23–30	22–32	27–22
Wembley	23–31	36–17	22–30	32–21	28–25	41–12		36–18	29–24
West Ham	35–19	33–21	31–23	36–17	33–21	40–14	23–31		34–19
Wimbledon	27–26	29–25	27–26	34–19	25–28	34–20	20–32	22–32	

Legend: Blue = home team win; Yellow = draw; Red = away team win.

== Top Ten Riders ==
	Rider	Nat	Team	Points	C.M.A.
1	Eric Langton	(England)	Belle Vue	186.5	10.32
2	Vic Huxley	(Australia)	Wimbledon	132	10.31
3	Jack Parker	(England)	Harringay	230	10.07
4	Tom Farndon	(England)	New Cross	240.5	10.06
5	Ginger Lees	(England)	Wembley	230	9.96
6	Dicky Case	(Australia)	Lea Bridge/Walthamstow	208	9.48
7	Bluey Wilkinson	(Australia)	West Ham	210	9.08
8	Joe Abbott	(England)	Belle Vue	168	9.05
9	Bill Kitchen	(England)	Belle Vue	182	8.97
10	Tiger Stevenson	(England)	West Ham	179	8.92

In the 1934 season, a league for reserves and junior riders was introduced. This wasn't continued in 1935. West Ham Reserves won the reserve league dropping just one point in 12 matches.

== Reserve League Final table ==
Pos	Team	PL	W	D	L	Pts
1	West Ham Reserves	12	11	1	0	23
2	Wembley Reserves	12	7	2	3	16
3	Harringay Reserves	12	6	1	5	13
4	Wimbledon Reserves	12	6	1	5	13
5	Birmingham Reserves	12	4	0	8	8
6	Belle Vue Reserves	12	3	0	9	6
7	New Cross Reserves	12	2	1	9	5

== National Trophy ==
The 1934 National Trophy was the fourth edition of the Knockout Cup.

First round

Date	Team one	Score	Team two
29/05	Plymouth	49-57	Lea Bridge

Quarterfinals

Date	Team one	Score	Team two
26/06	Birmingham	36-69	Belle Vue
23/06	Belle Vue	81-27	Birmingham
25/06	Wimbledon	67-38	Lea Bridge
29/06	Lea Bridge	60-47	Wimbledon
28/06	Wembley	59-49	Harringay
30/06	Harringay	33-74	Wembley
26/06	West Ham	48.5-59.5	New Cross
27/06	New Cross	69-36	West Ham

Semifinals

Date	Team one	Score	Team two
28/07	Belle Vue	48-30	Wimbledon
30/07	Wimbledon	32-75	Belle Vue
25/07	New Cross	42-62	Wembley
26/07	Wembley	67.5-40.5	New Cross

=== Final ===
First leg

1 September 1934

Belle Vue Aces Max Grosskreutz 16 Eric Langton 15 Joe Abbott 12 Bill Kitchen 12 Frank Charles 11 Frank Varey 5	71 – 36	Wembley Lions Ginger Lees 10 Wally Kilmister 9 Gordon Byers 8 Lionel Van Praag 6 Colin Watson 2 George Greenwood 1

Hyde Road

Second leg

6 September 1934

Wembley Lions Wally Kilmister 11 Ginger Lees 8 Gordon Byers 7 Lionel Van Praag 5 Harry Whitfield 2 Colin Watson 1	34 – 74	Belle Vue Aces Eric Langton 18 Max Grosskreutz 18 Joe Abbott 16 Frank Charles 9 Bill Kitchen 7 Frank Varey 6

Empire Stadium

Belle Vue were National Trophy Champions, winning on aggregate 164-87.

== A.C.U Cup ==
The 1934 Auto-Cycle Union Cup was the first edition of the Cup.

First round

Date	Team one	Score	Team two
14/08	Birmingham	49-59	Wembley

Quarterfinals

Date	Team one	Score	Team two
11/09	Plymouth	44–62	Harringay
12/09	New Cross	62–44	Wimbledon
15/09	Belle Vue	79–29	Wembley
18/09	West Ham	66–37	Walthamstow

Semifinals

Date	Team one	Score	Team two
29/09	Harringay	45–62	Belle Vue
09/10	West Ham	58-49	New Cross

=== Final ===
Date	Team one	Score	Team two
15/10	Belle Vue	56–51	West Ham

== London Cup ==
First round

Team one	Score	Team two
Wembley	60–47, 57–48	Wimbledon
Harringay	44–63, 41–66	New Cross

Semi final round

Team one	Score	Team two
Wembley	57–51, 46–62	West Ham
New Cross	69–38, 65–41	Walthamstow

=== Final ===
First leg

19 September 1934

New Cross Ron Johnson 16 Tom Farndon 15 Nobby Key 13 Stan Greatrex 9 George Newton 5 Joe Francis 4 Roy Dook 0 Harry Shepherd 0	62–44	West Ham Bluey Wilkinson 13 Stan Dell 10 Arthur Atkinson 9 Tommy Croombs 7 Broncho Dixon 4 Rol Stobart 1 Arthur Warwick 0 Wal Morton 0

New Cross Stadium

Second leg

25 September 1934

West Ham Bluey Wilkinson 17 Tommy Croombs 14 Arthur Atkinson 9 Broncho Dixon 6 Arthur Warwick 5 Stan Dell 2 Rol Stobart 0	53–52	New Cross Nobby Key 13 Ron Johnson 11 Joe Francis 10 Tom Farndon 8 Stan Greatrex 6 Harry Shepherd 2 George Newton 1 Roy Dook 1

West Ham Stadium

New Cross won on aggregate 114–97

== Riders & final averages ==
Belle Vue

- (England) Eric Langton 10.32
- (England) Joe Abbott 9.05
- (England) Bill Kitchen 8.97
- (England) Frank Charles 8.54
- (Australia) Max Grosskreutz 8.00
- (England) Oliver Langton 5.71
- (England) Frank Varey 5.11
- (England) Bob Harrison 4.94

Birmingham

- (England) Jack Ormston 8.33
- (England) Bill Pitcher 6.69
- (England) Les Wotton 6.51
- (England) Wally Lloyd 6.13
- (Australia) Jack Chapman 5.55
- (England) Billy Dallison 5.22
- (England) Arthur Tims 4.92
- (England) Tommy Gamble 4.10
- (England) Fred Strecker 3.30
- (Australia) Dick Wise 2.10

Harringay

- (England) Jack Parker 10.06
- (England) Norman Parker 8.27
- (Australia) Frank Arthur 7.19
- (England) Norman Evans 5.95
- (England) Cliff Parkinson 5.89
- (New Zealand) Charlie Blacklock 5.02
- (England) Roy Barrowclough 5.00
- (England) Billy Dallison 4.95
- (England) Phil Bishop 4.44

Lea Bridge/Walthamstow

- (Australia) Dicky Case 9.78/9.48
- (England) Dusty Haigh 7.94/6.87
- (England) Squib Burton 5.88/5.77
- (England) Wally Hull 4.44/4.43
- (England) Eric Blain 3.31/3.66
- (England) Chun Moore 3.00/3.18
- (Australia) Clem Thomas 2.96/3.10
- (Australia) Jack Bibby 2.86/3.02
- (Australia) Steve Langton 1.10

New Cross

- (England) Tom Farndon 10.06
- (England) Ron Johnson 8.00
- (England) Nobby Key 7.87
- (England) Joe Francis 7.02
- (England) Stan Greatrex 6.80
- (England) George Newton 4.55
- (England) Harry Shepherd 3.13
- (England) Roy Dook 3.27

Plymouth

- (Australia) Jack Sharp 7.89
- (England) Bill Clibbett 5.71
- (Australia) Bert Spencer 5.18
- (Australia) Frank Pearce 4.79
- (Austria) Leopold Killmeyer 4.75
- (England) Ted Bravery 4.71
- (England) Tiger Hart 4.67
- (Australia) Mick Murphy (John Glass) 4.59
- (England) Bill Stanley 4.16

Wembley

- (England) Ginger Lees 9.96
- (New Zealand) Wally Kilmister 8.63
- (England) Colin Watson 7.72
- (Australia) Lionel Van Praag 7.28
- (England) Gordon Byers 7.19
- (England) Harry Whitfield 6.58
- (England) George Greenwood 5.75
- (England) Les Bowden 3.00

West Ham

- (Australia) Bluey Wilkinson 9.08
- (England) Tommy Croombs 8.46
- (England) Broncho Dixon 7.25
- (England) Arthur Atkinson 5.85
- (England) Tiger Stevenson 6.44
- (England) Arthur Warwick 4.71
- (England) Stan Dell 4.50
- (England) Eric Gregory 4.29
- (England) Tommy Allott 3.71
- (England) Rol Stobbart 3.43
- (England) Wal Morton 2.43
- (Australia) Tiger Lewis 1.04

Wimbledon

- (Australia) Vic Huxley 10.31
- (England) Claude Rye 7.19
- (England) Wal Phillips 7.14
- (England) Geoff Pymar 6.70
- (England) Gus Kuhn 6.46
- (England) Syd Jackson 6.41
- (Australia) Wally Little 4.48
- (England) Alf Sawford 3.62
- (England) Fred Leavis 2.95
- (Australia) Bill Rogers 2.40

== See also ==
- List of United Kingdom Speedway League Champions
- Knockout Cup (speedway)
