= 1930 Speedway Northern League =

British motorcycle speedway season

- League: Northern League
- Season: 1930
- No. of competitors: 13
- Champions: Belle Vue Aces
- Highest average: Ginger Lees
- Division/s other: 1930 Southern League

The 1930 Northern League was the second season of speedway in the United Kingdom for Northern British teams. The league was previously known as the English Dirt Track League but the addition of two Scottish teams prompted a name change and 1930 was the inaugural Northern League. The Southern teams also had their second season known as the 1930 Speedway Southern League. The league was won by Belle Vue Aces.

== Summary ==
The league came under the jurisdiction of the Auto-Cycle Union.

There were many team changes from the previous season. Reigning champions Leeds Lions, Halifax, Salford and Middlesbrough dropped out. Manchester White City, Belle Vue and Warrington renewed their participation having withdrawn partway through the previous season. Edinburgh, Glasgow White City and Wombwell were new entrants. Barnsley, Manchester White City withdrew during the season but their records were not expunged. Rochdale decided to go into voluntary liquidation in August.

Eddie Reynolds was killed during the Glasgow Handicap match at the White City Stadium, Glasgow on 27 May 1930. After falling from his bike he was hit by Arthur Moser and suffered fatal injuries. Two more riders were killed later that season, James Carnie died on 24 July 1930, after crashing at Farringdon Park in Preston in the Golden Helmet event and William Owen was killed on 31 August, at Audenshaw Speedway in a handicap event.

== Final table ==
Pos	Team	PL	W	D	L	Pts
1	Belle Vue Aces	21	19	1	1	39
2	Liverpool	20	15	0	5	30
3	Manchester White City	15	13	0	2	26
4	Preston	18	10	0	8	20
5	Warrington	17	8	0	9	16
6	Leicester Super	18	6	1	11	13
7	Sheffield Blades	14	6	0	8	12
8	Edinburgh	12	5	0	7	12
9	Newcastle	15	5	0	10	10
10	Glasgow White City	17	4	0	13	8
11	Rochdale	12	4	0	8	8
12	Barnsley	13	4	0	9	8
13	Wombwell	12	2	0	10	4

== Results and fixtures ==
Home \ Away	BAR	BV	ED	GLA	LEI	LIV	MAN	NEW	PRE	ROC	SHE	WAR	WOM
Barnsley		n/a	n/a	n/a	n/a	14–22	n/a	20–16	n/a	n/a	23–13	n/a	20–16
Belle Vue	27–9		25–8	21–13	24–12	20–16	17–19	n/a	22–13	22–14	22–14	22–14	n/a
Edinburgh	22–14	13–21		n/a	n/a	n/a	12–24	26–10	21–15	n/a	17–19	23–13	20–4
Glasgow	n/a	16–20	n/a		23–13	10–26	16–19	16–20	20–12	17–19	18–17	17–18	n/a
Leicester Super	26–10	18–18	n/a	24–11		15–21	11–25	18–17	19–17	23–12	14–22	n/a	26–10
Liverpool	27–9	14–20	24–12	26–10	18–17		16–19	n/a	20–16	n/a	26–9	21–14	28–8
Manchester White City	n/a	15–18	n/a	n/a	26–9	21–15		28–8	17–18	n/a	n/a	25–11	n/a
Newcastle Gosforth	15–20	12–24	n/a	8–28	24–12	11–25	n/a		n/a	24–12	20–16	n/a	29–7
Preston	25–10	17.5–18.5	25–10	26–9	26–9	16–20	17–18	n/a		27–9	n/a	22–14	n/a
Rochdale	21–14	13–23	n/a	20–13	24–11	n/a	n/a	n/a	11–25		n/a	9–27	n/a
Sheffield	n/a	14–22	n/a	26–10	22–13	21–15	12–23	30–6	n/a	n/a		n/a	n/a
Warrington	26–10	10–25	22–14	23–12	n/a	14–22	11–25	n/a	14–22	28–8	16–15		n/a
Wombwell	24–12	16–20	n/a	n/a	n/a	8–28	10–23	23–13	14–22	n/a	n/a	15–21	

Legend: Blue = home team win; Yellow = draw; Red = away team win.

== Top Five Riders ==
		Team	C.M.A.
1	Ginger Lees	Liverpool	10.89
2	Frank Varey	Belle Vue	10.84
3	Joe Abbott	Preston	10.79
4	Frank Charles	Manchester White City	10.25
5	Eric Langton	Belle Vue	9.70

== Riders ==
Barnsley

- George Chance
- Joe Chance
- Billy Halstead
- Tom Lindley
- Arthur Moore
- Tommy Thompson
- Charlie Ward

Belle Vue

- Len Blunt
- Frank Burgess
- Frank Charles
- Clem Cort
- Percy Dunn
- Dusty Haigh
- Bob Harrison
- Arthur Franklyn
- Arthur Jervis
- Eric Langton
- Bruce McCallum
- Len Myerscough
- Frank Varey

Edinburgh

- George Cumming
- Bob McGregor
- George McKenzie
- Drew McQueen
- Syd Parsons
- Gordon Spalding
- Len Stewart

Glasgow

- Allan Campbell
- Billy Galloway
- Norrie Isbister
- Billy Llewellyn
- Arthur Mann
- Andy Marr
- Arthur Moser
- Bill Naismith
- Andy Nicholl
- George Pinkerton
- Jimmie Pinkerton
- Johnnie Short
- Col Stewart
- Jack White

Leicester

- Alec Bowerman
- Hal Herbert
- Fred Hore
- George Marsh
- Arthur Sherlock
- Bert Spencer
- Harold Stevens
- Nev Wheeler
- Fred Wilkinson
- Ned Wolloff

Liverpool

- Eric Blain
- Phil Blake
- Larry Boulton
- Frank Chiswell
- Chris Hughes
- Ginger Lees
- Eddie Myerscough
- Thomas Arthur Price
- Les Wotton

Manchester

- Frank Charles
- Max Grosskreutz
- Wally Hull
- Arthur Jervis
- Hugh Jervis
- Fred Strecker
- Arthur Wilcock
- Cyril Wilcock

Newcastle

- Gordon Byers
- Arnie Cattell
- Tommy Groves
- Tommy Harrison
- Buzz Hibberd
- Alec Hill
- Jim Holder
- Harry Huntley
- Frank Parker
- Charles Sanderson
- Roy Sanderson
- Tommy Storey

Preston

- Joe Abbott
- Ham Burrill
- Jack Chiswell
- Ivor Creek
- Thomas Arthur Price
- George Reynard
- Claude Rye
- Frank Smith
- Jack Tye

Rochdale

- Jack Atkinson
- Buster Breaks
- Billy Howard
- Eddie Ingham
- Austin Humphries
- Scott Michie
- Bud Proctor
- Bill Sticpewich
- Geoff Wilson

Sheffield

- Jack Barber
- Clem Beckett
- Jack Chapman
- Broncho Dixon
- Eric Hall
- Norman Hartley
- Chun Moore
- Laurie Packer
- Gus Platts
- Dick Wise

Warrington

- Cyril Crowther
- Norman Dawson
- Harold Formby
- Tommy Hatch
- Charlie Hornby
- Oliver Langton
- Alex McLachlan
- George Milton
- Harry Solomon

Wombwell

- William Burrows
- Jack Duddings
- Tommy Gamble
- Eric Gregory
- George Kilburn
- Frank Ledger
- Lester Moore

== See also ==
List of United Kingdom Speedway League Champions
