= 1931 Speedway Northern League =

British motorcycle speedway season

- League: Northern League
- No. of competitors: 6
- Champions: Belle Vue Aces
- Highest average: Eric Langton
- Division/s other: 1931 Southern League

The 1931 Northern League was the third season of speedway racing in the United Kingdom for Northern British teams. It was the final season of the Northern League before amalgamation with the Southern League which also had their third season known as the 1931 Speedway Southern League.

== Summary ==
Following the closure of several clubs from the previous season, only 6 sides started the season and only 4 finished it. There were many team changes from the previous season. Liverpool, Manchester White City, Warrington, Edinburgh, Newcastle, Rochdale Hornets, Barnsley and Wombwell were all no longer participants, while Leeds rejoined after a year's absence.

Belle Vue Aces retained their title, Glasgow White City and Leicester Super withdrew in mid-season but their results stood.

== Final table ==
Pos	Team	PL	W	D	L	Pts
1	Belle Vue Aces	18	12	0	6	24
2	Leeds Lions	18	10	1	7	21
3	Sheffield	17	10	0	7	20
4	Leicester Super	15	8	0	7	16
5	Preston	18	5	1	10	11
6	Glasgow White City	12	2	0	10	8

== Fixtures & results ==
=== A fixtures ===
Home \ Away	BV	GLA	LEE	LEI	PRE	SHE
Belle Vue		40–14	35–19	40–14	31–20	31–23
Glasgow White City	21–31		23–31	31–23	28–25	25–28
Leeds Lions	22–30	39–14		28–26	30–23	34–18
Leicester Super	29–24	39–15	29–24		34–20	31.5–22.5
Preston	27–23	35–18	26.5–26.5	35–19		32–20
Sheffield	39–15	35–19	34–19	32–22	34–19	

Legend: Blue = home team win; Yellow = draw; Red = away team win.

=== B fixtures ===
Home \ Away	BV	GLA	LEE	LEI	PRE	SHE
Belle Vue		n/a	34–19	n/a	27–24	33–21
Glasgow White City	24–30		n/a	n/a	n/a	n/a
Leeds Lions	27–26	31–17		34–18	34–17	28–26
Leicester Super	30–23	n/a	n/a		34–20	28–26
Preston	25–29	n/a	27–26	n/a		38–15
Sheffield	28–25	n/a	30–22	29–25	29–24	

Legend: Blue = home team win; Yellow = draw; Red = away team win.

== Top Five Riders ==
		Team	C.M.A.
1	Eric Langton	Belle Vue	11.28
2	Arthur Jervis	Leicester	10.14
3	Ginger Lees	Preston	10.06
4	Dusty Haigh	Sheffield	9.45
5	Joe Abbott	Preston	8.97

== National Trophy ==
The 1931 National Trophy was the first edition of the Knockout Cup. It was contested between teams from the Southern and Northern Leagues.

For the results of the National Trophy see - 1931 Speedway Southern League

== Riders & final averages ==
Belle Vue

- (England) Eric Langton 10.40
- (Australia) Max Grosskreutz 9.37
- (England) Frank Varey 8.05
- (England) Wally Hull 7.83
- (England) Arthur Franklyn 7.41
- (Australia) Len Woods 5.71
- (England) Bob Harrison 5.36
- (England) Frank Charles 5.33
- (England) Chun Moore 5.33
- (England) Clem Cort 4.18

Glasgow

- (Scotland) Drew McQueen 6.38
- (Scotland) Arthur Moser 6.10
- (Scotland) Andy Nicholl 5.33
- (England) Percy Dunn 5.29
- (England) Alfie Williams 5.12
- (Scotland) Norrie Isbister 4.18
- (Scotland) George McKenzie 3.73

Leeds

- (England) Frank Charles 8.91
- (England) Gordon Byers 8.29
- (England) Roy Barrowclough 8.14
- (England) Alec Hill 6.46
- (Scotland) Drew McQueen 6.22
- (England) Sam Marsland 5.90
- (England) Alex Peel 5.36
- (England) Harry Watson 5.19
- (England) Tommy Gamble 5.14

Leicester

- (England) Arthur Jervis 9.72
- (England) Thomas Arthur Price 8.34
- (England) Hal Herbert 7.88
- (England) Colin Watson 6.56
- (England) Fred Wilkinson 5.70
- (England) George Hazzard 4.95
- (England) George Marsh 4.74
- (Guernsey) Ian Ritchings 3.49
- (England) Alf Summersby 2.29

Preston

- (England) Ginger Lees 9.94
- (England) Joe Abbott 9.38
- (England) Larry Boulton 7.36
- (England) Jack Rowley 6.17
- (England) Les Wotton 5.89
- (England) Eric Airey 5.88
- (England) Eddie Myserscough 5.51
- (England) Jack Tye 5.56
- (Germany) Gustav Kellner 5.17

Sheffield

- (England) Dusty Haigh 9.74
- (England) Eric Blain 7.00
- (England) Broncho Dixon 6.31
- (England) Norman Hartley 6.08
- (England) Fred Hatton 6.00
- (England) Gus Platts 5.69
- (England) Tommy Allott 5.08
- (England) Jack Barber 4.94
- (England) Harry Credland 4.00

== See also ==
- List of United Kingdom Speedway League Champions
- Knockout Cup (speedway)
