= Tommy Gamble =

British motorcycle speedway rider

- Born: 21 November 1908; Scarborough, North Yorkshire, England
- Died: October 1981 (aged 72); York, England
- Nationality: British (English)

Career history
- 1929, 1931: Leeds
- 1930: Wombwell
- 1932: West Ham Hammers
- 1932–1933: Sheffield
- 1934: Lea Bridge Saints
- 1934: Birmingham Bulldogs

Individual honours
- 1929: Dirt Track League

Thomas Gamble (21 November 1908 – October 1981) was an international motorcycle speedway rider from England. He earned one international cap for the England national speedway team.

== Biography ==
Gamble, born in Scarborough rode in the pioneer years of British speedway beginning his British leagues career riding for Leeds during the 1929 Speedway English Dirt Track League. His first season ended with success as he was part of the Leeds team that won the league title that year.

In 1929, Gamble also won individual events called the Collacula and Alexandra Cups and Golden Helmet twice. However, Leeds dropped out of the league for 1930, forcing Gamble to find a new team and he signed for Wombwell for the 1930 Speedway Northern League. Following a poor season with Wombwell from a team perspective (because he was named their most improved rider) he returned to Leeds when Wombwell dropped out of the league in 1931.

Leeds chose not to compete following the introduction of the new 1932 Speedway National League, so Gamble was once again without a team. He was added to the West Ham Hammers squad but only rode a handful of matches during the season before returning north to join Sheffield. The following season with Sheffield, he was called up by England to represent them in a test match against Australia.

Once again, Gamble was forced to follow a nomadic existence in 1934, when Sheffield dropped out of the league. He rode for Lea Bridge Saints before they became the Walthamstow Wolves and then finally for Birmingham Bulldogs.
