= Eric Gregory (speedway rider) =

British motorcycle speedway rider

- Born: March 1911; Worsbrough, South Yorkshire, England
- Died: 28 April 1990 (aged 79); Natala, Eastern Cape, South Africa
- Nationality: British (English)

Career history
- 1930: Wombwell Colliers
- 1931–1933: Belle Vue Aces
- 1934–1939: Wembley Lions
- 1934: West Ham Hammers

Team honours
- 1933: league champion
- 1933: Knockout Cup winner

Eric Waterson Gregory (March 1911 – 28 April 1990) was an international motorcycle speedway rider from England. He earned two international caps for the England national speedway team.

== Biography ==
Gregory, born in Worsbrough, South Yorkshire, rode in the pioneer years of British speedway, beginning his British leagues career riding for Wombwell during the 1930 Speedway Northern League. He made an immediate impact working his way into the main team by July.

The following season, Gregory rode for Wombwell, Belle Vue reserves and a Manchester team who raced their home fixtures at Belle Vue. The volatile situation whereby new speedway ventures were being set up and closing down just as quick contributed to this.

In 1932, Gregory began racing on the Leeds track but then during the first season of the new National League, he found some stability by riding for Belle Vue Aces, enjoying a solid season and recording 7.15. One year later, he helped Belle Vue win the league and cup double, during the 1933 Speedway National League season.

Gregory moved to London in 1934 to join the Wembley Lions but spent most of the season on loan with the West Ham Hammers before returning to Wembley in 1935. From December 1936 to February 1937, Gregory was part of the England team that visited Australia and he also spent some time racing in Sweden.

After breaking a collar bone during 1937, Wembley signed Gus Kuhn as a replacement, although Gregory did return before the end of the season. He then broke his arm in early 1939, forcing him to miss what was left of the season before World War II curtailed the season.

Towards the latter part of the war, Gregory returned to ride individual and exhibition meetings in 1944 and 1945, but following a crash and another injury (hip), he retired from the sport.
