= Warrington Greyhound Stadium =

Greyhound racing and speedway stadium

- Interactive map of Warrington Greyhound Stadium
- Location: Warrington, Cheshire
- Coordinates: 53°23′03″N 2°35′51″W
- Operator: Warrington Greyhound Racing Association Ltd (1931-1949); Clapton Stadium Ltd (1950-1956)

Construction
- Opened: 1929
- Closed: 1956

Warrington Greyhound Stadium was a greyhound racing and speedway stadium in Arpley, Warrington, England.

== Origins ==
The site chosen for a new stadium in Warrington was a plot of land next to the Warrington and Stockport railway line at Arpley junction. The Stadium ran along the east side of Slutchers Lane.

== Opening ==
The stadium first opened for speedway on 29 March 1929 and was called the Arpley Motordrome. The first meeting saw Squib Burton win the Golden Helmet in front of over 10,000 people.

== History ==
The speedway promotion soon ran into trouble and at the end of 1930 the speedway went into liquidation. The team's assets (including the venue) were taken over by the management of the Liverpool speedway team (General Speedways (Liverpool) Ltd for £1,100. However, following a court battle, Liverpool were forced to relinquish the assets to a higher bidder.

The stadium found new tenants in 1931 after a greyhound track was added and started on 23 May 1931 as a National Greyhound Racing Club (NGRC) affiliated track. The first night featured seven races and there were just four track trainers, Bannister, Jennings, Rimmer and Wright.

The greyhound racing became independent (unaffiliated to a governing body) and it was some time later before the track switched back to the rules of the NGRC. In 1944, Gladstone Brigadier trained by Ken Newham won the Scottish Greyhound Derby at Carntyne Stadium.

The stadium was owned by the Warrington Greyhound Racing Association Ltd and featured a main covered grandstand on the home straight. There was an enclosed stand and sports club on the back straight and a racing club on the fourth bend. The entrance to the stadium was on Slutchers Lane but there was another entrance on the south side through the cricket grounds.

In July 1946 the first case of a greyhound travelling by air took place. Warrington greyhound Clady Border trained by Newham went from Manchester Airport to Belfast to take part in an event at Celtic Park in which he won.

Two of the tracks most notable trainers were Newham and Jimmy Jowett.

The principal event at the track was the Northern Puppy Championship and this took place on a circuit that had a circumference of 429 yards and distances of 291, 500 and 720 yards. The hare system was an 'Inside Sumner' and the racing kennels were behind the main grandstand but parallel to the railway line, the resident kennels could be found adjoining the stadium on the south side alongside Slutchers Lane.

The stadium came under the control of Clapton Stadium Ltd in the early 1950s which resulted in the leading trainer Jowett was moving to Clapton Stadium. The Director of Racing was Eric Godfrey and the Racing Manager was H Hunt.

Clapton Stadium Ltd owned five tracks that consisted of Clapton, Reading, Slough, Warrington and South Shields. The resident trainers towards the end of the tracks existence were Spensley and Mitchell and it was not unusual for them to train all of the participants in the five dog races held at the track.

== Speedway ==
Warrington (speedway) rode at Arpley in 1929 in the English Dirt-track League, then in 1930 competing in the Northern League, they also held demonstration meetings in 1949.

== Closure ==
Greyhound racing came to an end on 21 May 1956. Clapton Stadium Ltd sold the ground to raise capital for the company ten years before Clapton Stadium Ltd sold out to the Greyhound Racing Association. The stadium became a football ground for many years before being demolished and forming part of the new area known as the Centre Park, a very large business park.
