= Dusty Haigh =

British motorcycle speedway rider

- Born: Q1 1906; Huddersfield, West Yorkshire
- Died: 15 May 1936 (aged 30); Hackney, London
- Nationality: British (English)

Career history
- 1929: Halifax Dukes
- 1930, 1932: Belle Vue Aces
- 1931, 1933: Sheffield Tigers
- 1934: Lea Bridge
- 1934: Walthamstow Wolves
- 1935-1936: Hackney Wick Wolves

Team honours
- 1930: Northern League

Herbert Haigh known as Dusty Haigh (Q1 1906 – 15 May 1936) was an international motorcycle speedway rider, who rode in the earliest days of the sport in Britain.

== Speedway career ==
Haigh started riding in 1928 at Halifax before moving to Sheffield and Belle Vue Aces in 1930, where he won the 1930 Speedway Northern League. He finished fourth in the league averages during the 1931 Speedway Northern League season for Sheffield. In 1935, he moved from Lea Bridge to Walthamstow Wolves and made his test debut for the England national speedway team against Australia. He went on to earn 15 international caps for England.

During the 1936 Auto-Cycle Union Cup, Haigh was killed instantly after suffering a fractured skull riding at Hackney Wick Stadium on 15 May 1936, in the ACU Cup match between Hackney and West Ham. He fell when in front and heading for a fourth consecutive heat win and the riders behind were unable to avoid him. The crash was reported in most national newspapers as they focused on the fact that it had been witnessed by his wife Irene.

== Personal life ==
Haigh and his wife Irene started a millinery business in 1932 but it went bankrupt in 1934.

== See also ==
- Rider deaths in motorcycle speedway
