= Jim Kempster =

British speedway rider

- Born: 9 October 1900; Leighton Buzzard, Bedfordshire, England
- Died: 29 June 1945 (aged 44); Germany
- Nationality: British (English)

Career history
- 1929–1931: Wimbledon Dons
- 1933: Clapton Saints

Ernest Arthur David Kempster known as Jim Kempster (9 October 1900 – 29 June 1945) was an international speedway rider from England. He was the first captain of the England national speedway team.

== Education ==
Kempster attended Beaudesert School.

== Speedway career ==
Kempster earned the nickname 'Smiling Jim Kempster' and came to prominence in 1928 when he won a race against Roger Frogley, in a match deemed to be the English Championship. Kempster had raced against the early Australian pioneers. He earned significant prize money during 1928 and won an International title in front of 45,000 at the new Wimbledon Stadium. Kempster was given the title of World Champion after the success because he had beaten the former title holder Sprouts Elder, of the United States.

Kempster joined the Wimbledon Dons for the inaugural speedway season in England. He soon became their club captain and finished fourth in the riders league averages during the 1929 Speedway Southern League despite the fact that Wimbledon finished bottom of the league. He captained England against Australia on 30 June 1930, for England's first test match.

Kempster continued to ride in the top tier of British Speedway from 1929 to 1933. He signed for Clapton Saints in 1933. After retiring, he coached novice riders at Luton and made a brief comeback for the Wembley Lions during 1936 as a backup rider.

== Personal life ==
Kempster married Hilda Thompson in 1930.

Kempster was killed in a plane crash on 29 June 1945, while serving with the Air Transport Auxiliary during World War II and is buried at the Rheinberg War Cemetery.
