= Gordon Byers =

British motorcycle speedway rider

- Born: 7 November 1911; Sunderland, England
- Died: 20 December 2008 (aged 97)
- Nationality: British (English)

Career history
- 1929-1930: Newcastle
- 1931: Leeds Lions
- 1932–1936: Wembley Lions

Team honours
- 1932: National League Champion
- 1932: National Trophy Winner
- 1932, 1933: London Cup Winner

Alexander Gordon Byers (7 November 1911 – 20 December 2008) was an international motorcycle speedway rider from England. He was one of the early pioneers of speedway in Britain.

== Speedway career ==
Byers started riding motorcycles in Sunderland, aged 14 He rode in the inaugural meeting of Newcastle Speedway on 17 May 1929 when the club joined the 1929 Speedway English Dirt Track League. He helped Newcastle to a fourth place position in the league.

The following season, Byers stayed with Newcastle (in Gosforth) for the 1930 Speedway Northern League before joining Leeds Lions for the 1931 Speedway Northern League, he was Leeds' leading rider as the team finished runner up to Belle Vue Aces.

In 1932, Byers was considered one of Britain's leading riders and finished fourth in the 1932 Star Riders' Championship, which was the unofficial world championship of the world. He also joined the Wembley Lions who were considered the leading club at the time. He was a member of the team that won the 1932 Speedway National League.

Byers was selected by England becoming their youngest test rider and riding for them over the next two years. He continued to ride for Wembley from 1933 to 1936 and only suffered one poor period when he sustained leg and eye injuries. In August 1936, he broke the Cleveland Park track record and beat the soon to be world champion Jack Milne in a race. He signed for Wembley again for the 1937 season but failed to break into the team due to the fact that it contained many world stars at the time.

At retirement, Byers had earned three international caps for the Great Britain national speedway team.

Byers joined the Royal Navy in 1939 and married in 1949.

== Players cigarette cards ==
Byers is listed as number 4 of 50 in the 1930s Player's cigarette card collection.
