= Johnny Lloyd =

British speedway rider

- Born: 24 August 1907; Birmingham, England
- Died: 19 December 1985 (aged 78); Oxford, England
- Nationality: British (English)

Career history
- 1929: Hall Green Bulldogs
- 1929: Birmingham (Perry Barr)

John Peregrine Francis Lloyd (24 August 1907 - 19 December 1985) also known as Johnny Lloyd and Jack Lloyd was a motorcycle speedway rider who rode in the earliest days of the sport in Britain.

== Career ==
Lloyd is significant in the fact that he finished top of the league averages during the inaugural season of speedway in Great Britain. His average was 10.80 in the 1929 Speedway Southern League, for the Hall Green Bulldogs. The Bulldogs were to withdraw from the league, which meant Lloyd's feat was largely forgotten. When the Bulldogs withdrew, he joined the Birmingham (Perry Barr) team, who finished in ninth place.

Lloyd retired early from speedway at the end of the 1929 season to pursue a medical career.

== Family ==
Lloyd's two brothers Wally and Jeff were both professional speedway riders.
