= South Yorkshire Sports Stadium =

- Location: Station Road, Wombwell, near Barnsley, South Yorkshire
- Coordinates: 53°31′36″N 1°23′32″W
- Opened: 1928
- Closed: 1960s

South Yorkshire Sports Stadium was a greyhound racing and speedway stadium on Station Road in Wombwell, near Barnsley, South Yorkshire. It was one of two greyhound tracks in the town; the other was called the Wombwell Greyhound Stadium.

== Origins ==
The South Yorkshire Sports Stadium was constructed north of Station Road, south of Bulling Dike and accessed on a small road called Kent Row at the time.

== Opening ==
It opened unofficially on Saturday 17 April 1928 with 3,000 spectators raising £15 (the nights entrance fees) for local charities. One week later on Saturday 21 April 1928 the stadium officially opened charging 1/-, 2/- or 3/- for the relevant enclosures. Speedway followed in 1929.

== History ==
The greyhound racing was independent (not affiliated to the sports governing body the National Greyhound Racing Club) and was known as a flapping track which was the nickname given to independent tracks.

In February 1932 the end of speedway was confirmed because the circuit was converted to accommodate a new greyhound racing track, which had been the original purpose of the track back in 1928.

After World War II, the track was a popular venue with totalisator turnover peaking in 1946 at £64,255. The Wombwell public were also keen for speedway to return and formed a Supporters Club in January 1947, which was duly followed by the construction of a speedway oval around the greyhound racing track ready for the 1947 Speedway National League Division Three season.

The greyhound racing finished during May 1956.

== Speedway ==
Speedway was held sporadically from 1929 to 1965; the team were known as the Wombwell Colliers.

The stadium was demolished and later became the Valley Road industrial area.
