= Oliver Langton =

British motorcycle speedway rider

- Born: 9 June 1905; Leeds, England
- Died: 25 August 1978 (aged 73); Leeds, England
- Nationality: British (English)

Career history
- 1929: Leeds Lions
- 1930–1931, 1934–1939: Belle Vue Aces
- 1930: Warrington

Team honours
- 1929, 1931: Dirt Track/Northern League winner
- 1937, 1939: National Trophy
- 1937: ACU Cup

Oliver Langton (9 June 1905 – 25 August 1978) was an international motorcycle speedway rider from England. He earned one international cap for the England national speedway team.

== Biography ==
Langton, born in Leeds, started racing in trials and won the 1927 Scott Trial before racing in the senior 1929 Isle of Man TT.

Langton rode in the pioneer years of British speedway beginning his British leagues career riding for Leeds during the 1929 Speedway English Dirt Track League, where he contributed towards their league winning season and was the team captain. The following season, he rode for Warrington, in addition to making his debut for Belle Vue Aces.

Langton remained at Belle Vue from 1931 until the end of his career in 1939. During that time he was part of a team that won three consecutive trebles of league, National Trophy and ACU Cup.

During the World War II, Langton was a part-time fireman and trained despatch riders.

== Family ==
Langton's brother Eric was also a speedway rider and was capped by England 44 times.
