= Rochdale Hornets (speedway) =

British speedway team

Club information
- Track address: Athletic Grounds; Milnrow Road; Rochdale
- Country: England
- Founded: 1928, 1970
- Closed: 1930, 1971

Club facts
- Colours: yellow and black
- Track size: 441 yards (403 m)

The Rochdale Hornets were a British speedway team from Rochdale in the north west of England.

== History ==
Speedway arrived in Rochdale at the Athletic Grounds on 25 August 1928 with a scratch event. It was the inaugural year of the new dirt-track racing sport that had arrived from Australia. The creation of speedway in Rochdale was the brainchild of Alec Dovener but he had to relinquish his interest due to poor health.

The success of the first year led to a large increase of fixtures the following season and a new team simply called Rochdale were founder members of the English Dirt Track League. Racing continued in 1930 until the end of August, when it was decided to go into voluntary liquidation.

Forty years had passed when in 1970, speedway returned to the Athletic Grounds and a team were reformed by the promotion from the Belle Vue Aces. The team known as the Hornets (basically the Belle Vue Colts) would give the junior riders of Belle Vue a chance to progress under the control of Dent Oliver. The Hornets finished in a creditable third place during the 1970 British League Division Two season, with riders Eric Broadbelt and Taffy Owen recording excellent averages.

The track was not a good shape and proved to be unpopular with supporters. The safety fence was unusual in that it was made of steel plates supported on wire ropes. For the 1971 season the Hornets brought in Alan Wilkinson and Peter Collins (a future World Champion). The Hornets finished 9th but at the end of the season they moved on to Ellesmere Port.

== Season summary ==
Year and league	Position	Notes
1929 Speedway English Dirt Track League	6th	
1970 British League Division Two season	3rd	
1971 British League Division Two season	9th	

== Notable riders ==
- Eric Broadbelt
- Cyril "Squib" Burton
- Peter Collins
- Taffy Owen
- Alan Wilkinson
