= Great Britain national speedway team =

British motorcycle speedway nation

Great Britain
- Team manager: Simon Stead and Oliver Allen
- Team captain: Tai Woffinden
- SWC wins: 10 (1968, 1971, 1972, 1973, 1974, 1975, 1977, 1980, 1989)
- SON wins: 2 (2021, 2024)
- Squad: Robert Lambert; Dan Bewley; Tom Brennan; Tai Woffinden

The Great Britain national speedway team (formerly the England speedway team) is one of the major teams in international motorcycle speedway. The team is managed by former Great Britain riders Oliver Allen and Simon Stead, and captained by Tai Woffinden.

The team raced as England from 1928 to 1961 and again from 1974 to 2000. They have raced as Great Britain from 1962 to 1973 and since 2001.

== History ==
The national speedway team held test matches against the Australia as early as 1928, although the first official test match is listed as 30 June 1930 at Wimbledon Stadium.

The team won the Speedway World Team Cup on five occasions as England and four times as Great Britain from 1968 to 1989. They were a major force in the 1970s, winning five consecutive tournaments, two as England and three as Great Britain. Key riding members of the title wins include Peter Collins (five wins), Malcolm Simmons (four wins), New Zealand born Ivan Mauger and Ray Wilson (all three wins). Prior to 1974, the Great Britain team often consisted of riders from other Commonwealth Nations including Australia and New Zealand.

The cup eluded the team after 1989, although they came close in 2000, missing out when Mark Loram fell in a race-off and 2004 where a team of Mark Loram, Lee Richardson, Gary Havelock, David Norris and Scott Nicholls missed out by one point. Both the 2000 and 2004 narrow defeats were at the hands of Sweden and both in somewhat controversial fashion.

In June 2018, Great Britain competed as one of 15 nations in the inaugural Speedway of Nations tournament and in August 2018, Great Britain hosted a top-level international test match for the first time in over 15 years when they took on Australia at Glasgow's Peugeot Ashfield Stadium.

At the 2021 Speedway of Nations in Manchester, Team GB ended a 32 years drought. After finishing third in qualifying, they beat Denmark 6–3 in the Grand Final qualifier and then beat Poland in the Grand Final 5–4. The winning team included Robert Lambert, Dan Bewley and Tai Woffinden. The team subsequently won the 2024 Speedway of Nations.

== Major tournament wins ==
=== World Team Championships ===
Year	Venue	Standings (Pts)	Riders	Pts
1968	(England); London; Wembley Stadium	1. (United Kingdom) Great Britain (40); 2. Sweden (30); 3. Poland (19); 4. Czechoslovakia (7)	Ivan Mauger (NZ)	12
1968	(England); London; Wembley Stadium	1. (United Kingdom) Great Britain (40); 2. Sweden (30); 3. Poland (19); 4. Czechoslovakia (7)	Nigel Boocock	10
1968	(England); London; Wembley Stadium	1. (United Kingdom) Great Britain (40); 2. Sweden (30); 3. Poland (19); 4. Czechoslovakia (7)	Martin Ashby	8
1968	(England); London; Wembley Stadium	1. (United Kingdom) Great Britain (40); 2. Sweden (30); 3. Poland (19); 4. Czechoslovakia (7)	Barry Briggs (NZ)	7
1968	(England); London; Wembley Stadium	1. (United Kingdom) Great Britain (40); 2. Sweden (30); 3. Poland (19); 4. Czechoslovakia (7)	Norman Hunter	3
1971	(Poland); Wrocław; Stadion Olimpijski	1. (United Kingdom) Great Britain (37); 2. Soviet Union (22); 3. Poland (19); 4. Sweden (18)	Ray Wilson	12
1971	(Poland); Wrocław; Stadion Olimpijski	1. (United Kingdom) Great Britain (37); 2. Soviet Union (22); 3. Poland (19); 4. Sweden (18)	Ivan Mauger (NZ)	10
1971	(Poland); Wrocław; Stadion Olimpijski	1. (United Kingdom) Great Britain (37); 2. Soviet Union (22); 3. Poland (19); 4. Sweden (18)	Jim Airey (AUS)	9
1971	(Poland); Wrocław; Stadion Olimpijski	1. (United Kingdom) Great Britain (37); 2. Soviet Union (22); 3. Poland (19); 4. Sweden (18)	Barry Briggs (NZ)	6
1971	(Poland); Wrocław; Stadion Olimpijski	1. (United Kingdom) Great Britain (37); 2. Soviet Union (22); 3. Poland (19); 4. Sweden (18)	Ronnie Moore (NZ)	dnr
1972	(West Germany); Olching; Olching Speedwaybahn	1. (United Kingdom) Great Britain (36); 2. Soviet Union (21); 3. Poland (21); 4. Sweden (18)	Ivan Mauger (NZ)	11
1972	(West Germany); Olching; Olching Speedwaybahn	1. (United Kingdom) Great Britain (36); 2. Soviet Union (21); 3. Poland (21); 4. Sweden (18)	John Louis	9
1972	(West Germany); Olching; Olching Speedwaybahn	1. (United Kingdom) Great Britain (36); 2. Soviet Union (21); 3. Poland (21); 4. Sweden (18)	Terry Betts	9
1972	(West Germany); Olching; Olching Speedwaybahn	1. (United Kingdom) Great Britain (36); 2. Soviet Union (21); 3. Poland (21); 4. Sweden (18)	Ray Wilson	8
1972	(West Germany); Olching; Olching Speedwaybahn	1. (United Kingdom) Great Britain (36); 2. Soviet Union (21); 3. Poland (21); 4. Sweden (18)	Ronnie Moore (NZ)	dnr
1973	(England); London; Wembley Stadium	1. (United Kingdom) Great Britain (37); 2. Sweden (31); 3. Soviet Union (20); 4. Poland (8)	Peter Collins	12
1973	(England); London; Wembley Stadium	1. (United Kingdom) Great Britain (37); 2. Sweden (31); 3. Soviet Union (20); 4. Poland (8)	Terry Betts	9
1973	(England); London; Wembley Stadium	1. (United Kingdom) Great Britain (37); 2. Sweden (31); 3. Soviet Union (20); 4. Poland (8)	Malcolm Simmons	8
1973	(England); London; Wembley Stadium	1. (United Kingdom) Great Britain (37); 2. Sweden (31); 3. Soviet Union (20); 4. Poland (8)	Ray Wilson	8
1973	(England); London; Wembley Stadium	1. (United Kingdom) Great Britain (37); 2. Sweden (31); 3. Soviet Union (20); 4. Poland (8)	Dave Jessup	dnr
1974	(Poland); Chorzów; Stadion Śląski	1. England (42); 2. Sweden (31); 3. Poland (13); 4. Soviet Union (10)	Peter Collins	12
1974	(Poland); Chorzów; Stadion Śląski	1. England (42); 2. Sweden (31); 3. Poland (13); 4. Soviet Union (10)	John Louis	12
1974	(Poland); Chorzów; Stadion Śląski	1. England (42); 2. Sweden (31); 3. Poland (13); 4. Soviet Union (10)	Dave Jessup	10
1974	(Poland); Chorzów; Stadion Śląski	1. England (42); 2. Sweden (31); 3. Poland (13); 4. Soviet Union (10)	Malcolm Simmons	8
1974	(Poland); Chorzów; Stadion Śląski	1. England (42); 2. Sweden (31); 3. Poland (13); 4. Soviet Union (10)	Ray Wilson	dnr
1975	(Germany); Norden; Motodrom Halbemond	1. England (41); 2. Soviet Union (29); 3. Sweden (17); 4. Poland (9)	Peter Collins	12
1975	(Germany); Norden; Motodrom Halbemond	1. England (41); 2. Soviet Union (29); 3. Sweden (17); 4. Poland (9)	Malcolm Simmons	11
1975	(Germany); Norden; Motodrom Halbemond	1. England (41); 2. Soviet Union (29); 3. Sweden (17); 4. Poland (9)	Martin Ashby	10
1975	(Germany); Norden; Motodrom Halbemond	1. England (41); 2. Soviet Union (29); 3. Sweden (17); 4. Poland (9)	John Louis	8
1975	(Germany); Norden; Motodrom Halbemond	1. England (41); 2. Soviet Union (29); 3. Sweden (17); 4. Poland (9)	Dave Jessup	dnr
1977	(Poland); Wrocław; Stadion Olimpijski	1. England (37); 2. Poland (25); 3. Czechoslovakia (23); 4. Sweden (11)	Peter Collins	10
1977	(Poland); Wrocław; Stadion Olimpijski	1. England (37); 2. Poland (25); 3. Czechoslovakia (23); 4. Sweden (11)	Michael Lee	9
1977	(Poland); Wrocław; Stadion Olimpijski	1. England (37); 2. Poland (25); 3. Czechoslovakia (23); 4. Sweden (11)	Dave Jessup	9
1977	(Poland); Wrocław; Stadion Olimpijski	1. England (37); 2. Poland (25); 3. Czechoslovakia (23); 4. Sweden (11)	John Davis	6
1977	(Poland); Wrocław; Stadion Olimpijski	1. England (37); 2. Poland (25); 3. Czechoslovakia (23); 4. Sweden (11)	Malcolm Simmons	3
1980	(Poland); Wrocław; Stadion Olimpijski	1. England (40); 2. United States (29); 3. Poland (15); 4. (Czech Republic) Czechoslovakia (12)	Michael Lee	11
1980	(Poland); Wrocław; Stadion Olimpijski	1. England (40); 2. United States (29); 3. Poland (15); 4. (Czech Republic) Czechoslovakia (12)	Chris Morton	11
1980	(Poland); Wrocław; Stadion Olimpijski	1. England (40); 2. United States (29); 3. Poland (15); 4. (Czech Republic) Czechoslovakia (12)	Peter Collins	10
1980	(Poland); Wrocław; Stadion Olimpijski	1. England (40); 2. United States (29); 3. Poland (15); 4. (Czech Republic) Czechoslovakia (12)	Dave Jessup	8
1980	(Poland); Wrocław; Stadion Olimpijski	1. England (40); 2. United States (29); 3. Poland (15); 4. (Czech Republic) Czechoslovakia (12)	John Davis	dnr
1989	(England); Bradford; Odsal Stadium	1. England (48); 2. Denmark (34); 3. Sweden (30); 4. United States (8)	Jeremy Doncaster	13
1989	(England); Bradford; Odsal Stadium	1. England (48); 2. Denmark (34); 3. Sweden (30); 4. United States (8)	Paul Thorp	12
1989	(England); Bradford; Odsal Stadium	1. England (48); 2. Denmark (34); 3. Sweden (30); 4. United States (8)	Kelvin Tatum	12
1989	(England); Bradford; Odsal Stadium	1. England (48); 2. Denmark (34); 3. Sweden (30); 4. United States (8)	Simon Wigg	11
1989	(England); Bradford; Odsal Stadium	1. England (48); 2. Denmark (34); 3. Sweden (30); 4. United States (8)	Simon Cross	0
2021	(England); Manchester; National Speedway Stadium	1. (United Kingdom) Great Britain (64+6+5); 2. Poland (74+4); 3. Denmark (68+3); 4. Australia (49); 5. France (47); 6. Latvia (42); 7. Sweden (30)	Robert Lambert	32+4+3
2021	(England); Manchester; National Speedway Stadium	1. (United Kingdom) Great Britain (64+6+5); 2. Poland (74+4); 3. Denmark (68+3); 4. Australia (49); 5. France (47); 6. Latvia (42); 7. Sweden (30)	Dan Bewley	11+2+2
2021	(England); Manchester; National Speedway Stadium	1. (United Kingdom) Great Britain (64+6+5); 2. Poland (74+4); 3. Denmark (68+3); 4. Australia (49); 5. France (47); 6. Latvia (42); 7. Sweden (30)	Tai Woffinden	14
2021	(England); Manchester; National Speedway Stadium	1. (United Kingdom) Great Britain (64+6+5); 2. Poland (74+4); 3. Denmark (68+3); 4. Australia (49); 5. France (47); 6. Latvia (42); 7. Sweden (30)	Tom Brennan	7
2024	(England); Manchester; National Speedway Stadium	1. (United Kingdom) Great Britain (35+5+7); 2. Australia (36+2); 3. Sweden (27+4); 4. Germany (26); 5. Poland (24); 6. Denmark (21); 7. Latvia (20)	Robert Lambert	22+3+4
2024	(England); Manchester; National Speedway Stadium	1. (United Kingdom) Great Britain (35+5+7); 2. Australia (36+2); 3. Sweden (27+4); 4. Germany (26); 5. Poland (24); 6. Denmark (21); 7. Latvia (20)	Dan Bewley	13+2+3
2024	(England); Manchester; National Speedway Stadium	1. (United Kingdom) Great Britain (35+5+7); 2. Australia (36+2); 3. Sweden (27+4); 4. Germany (26); 5. Poland (24); 6. Denmark (21); 7. Latvia (20)	Tom Brennan	dnr

== Titles ==
Preceded by Sweden	World Champions; 1968 (1st title)	Succeeded by Poland
Preceded by Sweden	World Champions; 1971 (2nd title); 1972 (3rd title); 1973 (4th title); 1974 (5th title); 1975 (6th title)	Succeeded by Australia
Preceded by Australia	World Champions; 1977 (7th title)	Succeeded by Denmark
Preceded by New Zealand	World Champions; 1980 (8th title)	Succeeded by Denmark
Preceded by Denmark	World Champions; 1989 (9th title)	Succeeded by United States
Preceded by Russia	World Champions; 2021 (10th title)	Succeeded by Australia
Preceded by Poland	World Champions; 2024 (11th title)	Succeeded by

=== World Pairs Championship ===
Year	Venue	Standings (Pts)	Riders	Pts
1972	(Sweden); Borås; Ryavallen	1. England (24); 2. New Zealand (24); 3. Sweden B (22); 4. Sweden A (22); 5. Poland (15); 6. Czechoslovakia (12); 7. Hungary (6)	Ray Wilson	15+3
1972	(Sweden); Borås; Ryavallen	1. England (24); 2. New Zealand (24); 3. Sweden B (22); 4. Sweden A (22); 5. Poland (15); 6. Czechoslovakia (12); 7. Hungary (6)	Terry Betts	9
1976	(Sweden); Eskilstuna; Snälltorpet	1. England (27); 2. Denmark (24); 3. Sweden (22); 4. Australia (16); 5. New Zealand (15); 6. Scotland (12); 7. Poland (10)	John Louis	17
1976	(Sweden); Eskilstuna; Snälltorpet	1. England (27); 2. Denmark (24); 3. Sweden (22); 4. Australia (16); 5. New Zealand (15); 6. Scotland (12); 7. Poland (10)	Malcolm Simmons	10
1977	(England); Manchester; Hyde Road	1. England (28); 2. Sweden (18); 3. West Germany (18); 4. (Czech Republic) Czechoslovakia (17); 5. New Zealand (17); 6. Finland (14); 7. Australia (12)	Peter Collins	15
1977	(England); Manchester; Hyde Road	1. England (28); 2. Sweden (18); 3. West Germany (18); 4. (Czech Republic) Czechoslovakia (17); 5. New Zealand (17); 6. Finland (14); 7. Australia (12)	Malcolm Simmons	13
1978	(Poland); Chorzówr; Stadion Śląski	1. England (24); 2. New Zealand (24); 3. Denmark (21); 4. (Czech Republic) Czechoslovakia (18); 5. Poland (15); 6. West Germany (13); 7. Sweden (11)	Malcolm Simmons	15+3
1978	(Poland); Chorzówr; Stadion Śląski	1. England (24); 2. New Zealand (24); 3. Denmark (21); 4. (Czech Republic) Czechoslovakia (18); 5. Poland (15); 6. West Germany (13); 7. Sweden (11)	Gordon Kennett	9
1980	(Socialist Federal Republic of Yugoslavia); Krsko; Matija Gubec Stadium	1. England (29); 2. Poland (22); 3. Denmark (21); 4. Sweden (18); 5. New Zealand (16); 6. Finland (14); 7. (Socialist Federal Republic of Yugoslavia) Yugoslavia (6)	Dave Jessup	15
1980	(Socialist Federal Republic of Yugoslavia); Krsko; Matija Gubec Stadium	1. England (29); 2. Poland (22); 3. Denmark (21); 4. Sweden (18); 5. New Zealand (16); 6. Finland (14); 7. (Socialist Federal Republic of Yugoslavia) Yugoslavia (6)	Peter Collins	14
1983	(Sweden); Göteborg; Ullevi	1. England (25); 2. Australia (24); 3. Denmark (19); 4. United States (18); 5. Sweden (16); 6. West Germany (12); 7. New Zealand (11)	Kenny Carter	15
1983	(Sweden); Göteborg; Ullevi	1. England (25); 2. Australia (24); 3. Denmark (19); 4. United States (18); 5. Sweden (16); 6. West Germany (12); 7. New Zealand (11)	Peter Collins	10
1984	(Italy); Lonigo; Santa Marina Stadium	1. England (27); 2. Denmark (25); 3. New Zealand (25); 4. United States (19); 5. Australia (14); 6. Czechoslovakia (10); 7. Italy (6)	Chris Morton	14
1984	(Italy); Lonigo; Santa Marina Stadium	1. England (27); 2. Denmark (25); 3. New Zealand (25); 4. United States (19); 5. Australia (14); 6. Czechoslovakia (10); 7. Italy (6)	Peter Collins	13

== International caps (as of 2022) ==
Since the advent of the Speedway Grand Prix era, international caps earned by riders is largely restricted to international competitions, whereas previously test matches between two teams were a regular occurrence. This means that the number of caps earned by a rider has decreased in the modern era.

Rider	Caps for England	Caps for Great Britain	Total
Abbott, Joe	30	-	30
Airey, Jim (Australia)	-	17	17
Allen, Oliver	-	2	2
Andrew, Bill (New Zealand)	-	7	7
Andrews, Bob	21	12	33
Ashby, Martin	49	21	70
Ashworth, Ricky	-	1	1
Atkinson, Arthur	30	-	30
Auffret, Frank	6	-	6
Bales, Billy	12	1	13
Barker, Ben	-	5	5
Barker, Dean	14	4	18
Bastable, Steve	18	-	18
Beaton, Bobby (Scotland)	-	1	1
Betts, Terry	55	19	74
Bird, Danny	-	1	1
Blackbird, Carl	8	-	8
Boocock, Eric	53	37	90
Boocock, Nigel	90	64	154
Boothroyd, Eric	2	1	3
Boss, Chris (Wales)	5	-	5
Boulger, John (Australia)	-	5	5
Bounds, Reg	2	-	2
Bradley, Dick	24	-	24
Brett, Brian	3	4	7
Bridger, Lewis	-	5	5
Briggs, Barry (New Zealand)	-	57	57
Brine, Cyril	12	-	12
Broadbank, Mike	28	8	36
Broadbelt, Eric	17	14	31
Brown, Ivor	1	-	1
Burton, Squib	7	-	7
Bush, Arthur	5	-	5
Byers, Gordon	3	-	3
Byford, Howdy	6	-	6
Carr, Peter	12	-	12
Carter, Kenny	51	-	51
Cartwright, Ian	6	-	6
Clarke, Tony	11	2	13
Clarke, Phil	5	-	5
Clarke, Ron	9	-	9
Clark, Pat	2	-	2
Clibbett, Bill	1	-	1
Close, Derick	2	-	2
Cole, Howard (Wales)	10	1	11
Coles, Bob	1	-	1
Coles, Michael	2	-	2
Collins, Les	31	-	31
Collins, Neil	19	-	19
Collins, Peter	118	9	127
Collins, Phil	55	1	56
Cottrell, Col	1	-	1
Courtney, Mark	5	-	5
Cox, Marvyn	25	-	25
Craven, Gil	1	-	1
Craven, Malcolm	11	-	11
Craven, Peter	48	12	60
Cresp, Ray (Australia)	-	6	6
Cribb, Bruce (New Zealand)	-	3	3
Croombs, Tommy	30	-	30
Cross, Simon	33	-	33
Crutcher, Brian	23	-	23
Cunningham, Glenn	2	-	2
Davey, Tony	11	-	11
Davis, John	64	-	64
Dent, Russ	1	-	1
Doncaster, Jeremy	52	-	52
Drury, Graham (Wales)	1	-	1
Dugard, Martin	41	-	41
Edwards, Bert	7	-	7
Elliott, Bryan	6	-	6
Erskine, Jon	1	2	3
Etheridge, Laurie	1	-	1
Evans, Norman	1	-	1
Evitts, Neil	27	-	27
Farndon, Tom	21	-	21
Featherby, Clive	-	1	1
Fisher, Dick	1	4	5
Forrest, Arthur	26	-	26
France, Rick	1	4	5
Francis, Joe	6	-	6
French, Eric	8	-	8
Frogley, Roger	3	-	3
Galvin, Andy	1	-	1
Gamble, Tommy	1	-	1
Genz, Ronnie	7	1	8
Gifford, Dave (New Zealand)	-	2	2
Gilbert, Bill	6	-	6
Glover, Carl	1	-	1
Gofffe, Lloyd	1	-	1
Golden, Alby	-	1	1
Gooch, Jimmy	10	3	13
Gooddy, Colin	1	-	1
Goulden, Frank	1	-	1
Grahame, Alan	42	-	42
Grahame, Andy	16	-	16
Gray, Dennis	1	-	1
Greatrex, Stan	5	-	5
Green, Richard	1	-	1
Green, Wally	6	-	6
Greenwood, George	2	-	2
Greer, Richard	4	-	4
Gregory, Eric	2	-	2
Gregory, Les	1	-	1
Grifiths, Syd (Wales)	1	-	1
Hagon, Alf	4	-	4
Haigh, Dusty	15	-	15
Haley, Arnie	33	6	39
Harkins, Bert (Scotland)	7	4	11
Harris, Chris	-	22	22
Harris, Dick	5	-	5
Harrison, Bob	10	-	10
Hart, Oliver	16	-	16
Havelock, Gary	54	12	66
Hedge, Trevor	16	17	33
Hemus, Dave	-	1	1
Herbert, Hal	1	-	1
Hill, Roger	1	-	1
Holden, Kevin	5	7	12
How, Ron	44	12	56
Howe, Ben	8	-	8
Howe, David	-	4	4
Hull, Wally	2	-	2
Hunt, Alan	26	-	26
Hunt, Tim	1	-	1
Hunter, George (Scotland)	17	16	33
Hunter, Norman	9	13	22
Hurry, Paul	12	5	17
Hussey, Gerry	2	-	2
Jackson, Syd	8	-	8
Jay, Alan	1	-	1
Jervis, Arthur	2	-	2
Jessup, Dave	97	-	97
Johns, Roger	2	-	2
Jolly, Kevin	6	-	6
Jones, Graham	3	-	3
Kelly, Peter	1	-	1
Kempster, Jim	4	-	4
Kennett, Edward	-	10	10
Kennett, Gordon	53	-	53
Kentwell, Greg (Australia)	-	1	1
Key, Nobby	11	-	11
Kilby, Bob	37	5	42
King, Danny	-	6	6
Kitchen, Bill	41	-	41
Kitchen, Jack	-	2	2
Knight, Richard	20	-	20
Kuhn, Gus	4	-	4
Landels, Bill (Scotland)	1	8	9
Langton, Eric	44	-	44
Langton, Oliver	1	-	1
Lawson, Louis	7	-	7
Leadbitter, Tom	2	-	2
Lee, Michael	72	-	72
Lees, Ginger	22	-	22
Levai, Sandor (Hungary)	1	1	2
Lightfoot, Jim	1	3	4
Lloyd, Jeff	5	-	5
Lloyd, Wally	8	-	8
Lomas, Tony	12	-	12
Loram, Mark	36	10	46
Louis, Chris	41	3	44
Louis, John	54	4	58
Luckhurst, Reg	4	7	11
McAuliffe, Leo (Wales)	-	1	1
McGillivray, Les	2	-	2
McGregor, Gordon (Scotland)	19	1	20
McKinlay, Ken (Scotland)	92	23	115
McMillan, Jim (Scotland)	28	31	59
Maidment, Cyril	6	16	22
Mardon, Geoff (New Zealand)	-	1	1
Mauger, Ivan (New Zealand)	-	47	47
Mear, Robert	-	2	2
Middleditch, Ken	5	-	5
Middleditch, Neil	7	-	7
Miller, Tommy (Scotland)	5	-	5
Milner, Keith	1	-	1
Molyneux, Alan	1	-	1
Monk, Charlie (Australia)	-	15	15
Moore, Peter (Australia)	-	3	3
Moore, Ronnie (New Zealand)	-	21	21
Morton, Chris	115	7	122
Morton, Dave	18	-	18
Morton, Ray	1	-	1
Mountford, Ron	25	4	29
Mudge, Geoff (Australia)	-	1	1
Mullett, Dave	3	-	3
Neath, Chris	-	1	1
Newton, George	12	-	12
Nicholls, Nick	5	-	5
Nicholls, Scott	8	27	35
Norris, David	20	8	28
Oakley, Bob	1	-	1
Oliver, Dent	19	-	19
Ormston, Jack	14	-	14
Owen, Joe	3	-	3
Owen, Les	2	1	3
Owen, Tom	1	-	1
Parker, Dennis	5	-	5
Parker, Jack	89	-	89
Parker, Norman	36	-	36
Parkinson, Cliff	17	7	24
Paulson, Bob	3	-	3
Pawson, Fred	5	-	5
Phillips, Wal	27	-	27
Pitcher, Bill	7	-	7
Plant, Graham	5	1	6
Pratt, Colin	14	7	21
Price, Arthur	3	-	3
Price, Tommy	23	-	23
Pusey, Chris	51	-	51
Pymar, Geoff	12	-	12
Richardson, Colin	1	-	1
Richardson, Lee	1	25	26
Rigg, Eddie	14	-	14
Roger, Bert	11	-	11
Roger, Cyril	25	-	25
Rogers, Fred	1	-	1
Roper, Tommy	4	-	4
Rossiter, Alun	8	-	8
Roynon, Adam	-	1	1
Rye, Claude	4	-	4
Schofield, Steve	12	-	12
Scott, Jack (Australia)	-	1	1
Screen, Joe	37	7	44
Sharpe, Les (Australia)	-	2	2
Sharples, Ken	8	-	8
Silver, Andrew	22	-	22
Simmons, Malcolm	73	5	78
Small, Terry	1	-	1
Smith, Andy	29	-	29
Smith, Kevin	3	-	3
Smith, Pete	7	2	9
Squibb, Jimmy	4	4	8
Standing, Dean	4	-	4
Statham, Alec	22	-	22
Stead, Simon	-	11	11
Stevenson, Tiger	27	-	27
Stobbart, Rol	2	-	2
Stonehewer, Carl	7	5	12
Street, Neil (Australia)	-	1	1
Sweetman, Tommy	6	-	6
Tatum, Kelvin	65	-	65
Taylor, Chum (Australia)	-	1	1
Thomas, Barry	26	-	26
Thorp, Paul	31	-	31
Trigg, Roy	31	5	36
Trott, Reg	1	-	1
Tyrer, Paul	1	-	1
Unstead, Jack	2	-	2
Varey, Frank	21	-	21
Warwick, Arthur	7	-	7
Waterman, Split	32	-	32
Watkin, Mike	1	1	2
Watson, Colin	9	-	9
White, George	19	-	19
White, Keith	7	-	7
Whitfield, Harry	1	-	1
Wigg, Simon	57	-	57
Wilkinson, Alan	12	-	12
Wilkinson, Fred	2	-	2
Wilks, George	9	-	9
Williams, Eric (Wales)	23	-	23
Williams, Freddie (Wales)	28	-	28
Williams, Ian (Wales)	8	-	8
Wilson, Ray	72	36	108
Wilson, Reg	7	16	23
Wilson, Sean	23	2	25
Woffinden, Tai	-	11	11
Woods, Paul	2	-	2
Wotton, Les	13	-	13
Wright, Arthur	7	-	7
Wyer, Doug	46	14	60
Young, Jack	-	1	1
Younghusband, Dave	8	3	11

== Managers ==
- 1975–1975 (Reg Fearman)
- 1975–1976 (John Berry)
- 1976–1976 (Len Silver)
- 1977–1978 (John Berry)
- 1979–1980 (Colin Pratt)
- 1980–1980 (Ian Thomas)
- 1981–1981 (Len Silver)
- 1982–1982 (Eric Boocock)
- 1983–1984 (Wally Mawdsley)
- 1984–1984 (Carl Glover)
- 1984–1985 (John Berry)
- 1982 & 1986–1993 (Eric Boocock)
- 1986–1993 (Colin Pratt)
- 1994–1998 (John Louis)
- 1994–1994 (James Easter)
- 1998–2001 (Dave Jessup)
- 2001–2008 (Neil Middleditch)
- 2009–2010 (Rob Lyon)
- 2011–2013 (Neil Middleditch)
- 2014–2019 (Alun Rossiter)
- 2019– (Oliver Allen)
- 2019– (Simon Stead)
