= Arch Windmill =

British speedway rider (1915–2007)

- Born: 5 June 1915; Bushey Heath, Hertfordshire, England
- Died: 5 March 2007 (aged 91)
- Nationality: British (English)

Career history
- 1936–1939: Hackney Wick Wolves
- 1946–1949: Wimbledon Dons
- 1949–1951: Walthamstow Wolves
- 1952: Aldershot Shots

Albert Archibald Windmill (5 June 1915 – 5 March 2007) was a British motorcycle speedway rider who rode for Hackney Wick Wolves in the 1930s and Wimbledon Dons and Walthamstow Wolves after World War II.

== Career ==
Originally from Watford, Windmill began his racing career in grasstrack at Barnet in 1934. His first experience of speedway was at Birmingham in 1936, signing shortly afterwards for Hackney Wick. He stayed with the Wolves until the start of World War II in 1939, spending the war years in the Royal Air Force.

After being demobbed, Windmill opened Windmill Garage in Hemel Hempstead, and returned to speedway with Wimbledon, where he scored 11 points in his first match and spent the season at reserve, averaging 3.80. He moved on to Walthamstow Wolves at the start of the 1949 season. When the Wolves closed down at the end of 1951 he moved on to Southern League club Aldershot for his final season, retiring at the end of 1952.

Windmill represented England in the 1939 Test series against the Dominions.

In his later years, Windmill became president of the Veteran Speedway Riders' Association.
