= Wally Hull =

British motorcycle speedway rider

- Born: 2 March 1907; Manchester, England
- Died: 10 March 1985 (aged 78); Macclesfield, Cheshire, England
- Nationality: British (English)

Career history
- 1929–1930: White City Manchester
- 1931–1932, 1947–1948: Belle Vue Aces
- 1932: Wimbledon Dons
- 1933: Sheffield Tigers
- 1934: Lea Bridge/Walthamstow Wolves

Team honours
- 1931: Northern League Champion
- 1931: Northern League KO Cup Winner
- 1935, 1936: National League Champion
- 1935, 1936, 1937, 1947: National Trophy Winner
- 1935, 1936, 1937: ACU Cup
- 1939: British Speedway Cup

Walter Norbury Hull (2 March 1907 – 10 March 1985) was an international motorcycle speedway rider from England. He earned two international caps for the England national speedway team.

== Biography ==
Hull, born in Manchester, rode in the pioneer years of British speedway beginning his British leagues career riding for White City Manchester during the inaugural 1929 Speedway English Dirt Track League season. He was described as the Altrincham star. He gained recognition in 1930 and was selected to represent England against Australia.

Hull's two seasons with the Manchester club were chaotic because they withdrew from the league on both occasions. In 1931, he joined Belle Vue Aces, where he would enjoy a better foundation and duly impressed with an 8.84 league average and helping his team become league champions.

Following the amalgamation of the Southern and Northern leagues for the 1932 Speedway National League season, Hull was transferred, moving to London to ride for the Wimbledon Dons. His form dipped and he found himself spending a season with Sheffield Tigers in 1933 and then had a fractured season in 1934, riding for the Lea Bridge/Walthamstow team.

In 1935, Hull returned to Belle Vue, where he would spend the remainder of his career (with a enforced break during World War II), retiring in 1948. He won several numerous trophies with the club including the 1935 and 1936 trebles.
