= Wombwell Greyhound Stadium =

Defunct stadium in England

- Interactive map of Wombwell Greyhound Stadium
- Location: Hough Lane, Wombwell, near Barnsley, South Yorkshire
- Coordinates: 53°31′13″N 1°24′13″W

Construction
- Opened: 1934
- Closed: 1972

Wombwell Greyhound Stadium was a greyhound racing and football stadium on Hough Lane in Wombwell, near Barnsley, South Yorkshire. It was one of two greyhound tracks in the town; the other was called the South Yorkshire Sports Stadium.

== Origins ==
The Wombwell Greyhound Stadium was constructed on the north side of Hough Lane, west of Summer Lane and south of allotment gardens on an existing football ground.

== Opening ==
Whippet racing is known to have taken place before the greyhound racing started in 1934. The greyhound racing was independent (not affiliated to the sports governing body the National Greyhound Racing Club) and was known as a flapping track which was the nickname given to independent tracks.

== History ==
Racing took place on Tuesday and Saturday evenings at 7.15pm on a track circumference of 410 yards. In 1949 it was featured by the National Coal Board when a television documentary was filmed there.

It could accommodate 10,000 spectators and annual events included the Yorkshire Sprint and Yorkshire Derby on the all-grass track. The race distances were 360, 460 and 700 yards with an 'Inside Sumner' hare system.

== Closure ==
Racing continued until 29 June 1972 when it closed. The site was used to build a new school called the Oakfield Junior School later Kings Oak Primary School.
