= Barnsley (speedway) =

Defunct British speedway team

Coordinates: 53.563368°N 1.428226°W

Club information
- Track address: Lund Wood off Pontefract Road; Lundwood; Barnsley
- Country: England
- Founded: 1928
- Closed: 1930
- League: Northern League

Barnsley were a British speedway team from Barnsley, England, that competed in the English Dirt Track League in the inaugural season of British Speedway in 1929.

== History ==
Formed in 1928, they first competed in the English Dirt Track League (effectively the Northern League) in 1929, when they finished 11th. They closed midway through the 1930 Northern League season. They were based at Pontefract Road, Lundwood, Barnsley. The track was in the middle of a wood called Lund Wood and could be accessed from pathways from Lund Lane or Pontefract Road.

They hold the distinction of staging the first ever British Speedway League match when they hosted Burnley on 6 April 1929. Although the fixture between Leeds at home and Barnsley on 23 March took place earlier, it was only a friendly match and was called an inter-track event.

== Season summary ==
Year and league	Position	Notes
1929 Speedway English Dirt Track League	11th	
1930 Speedway Southern League	12th	
