= 1929 Speedway Southern League =

English motorcycle speedway league season

- League: Southern League
- No. of competitors: 11
- Champions: Stamford Bridge
- Highest average: Johnny Lloyd
- Division/s other: 1929 Dirt Track League

The 1929 Southern League was the inaugural season of motorcycle speedway in the United Kingdom for Southern British teams. There was also a Northern League called the 1929 Speedway English Dirt Track League that started during the same year. The sport had been introduced to England in 1928 at High Beech Speedway.

== Summary ==
Stamford Bridge were crowned as the first champions, just two points ahead of Southampton Saints. Birmingham Hall Green withdrew after 7 meetings and their record was expunged.

== Final table ==
Pos	Team	PL	W	D	L	Pts
1	Stamford Bridge	20	17	0	3	34
2	Southampton Saints	20	16	0	4	32
3	Coventry	20	14	0	6	28
4	Crystal Palace Glaziers	20	11	0	9	22
5	Wembley Lions	20	11	0	9	22
6	West Ham Hammers	20	8	0	12	16
7	White City	20	8	0	12	16
8	Harringay Canaries	20	7	0	13	14
9	Birmingham (Perry Barr)	20	7	0	13	14
10	Lea Bridge	20	6	0	14	12
11	Wimbledon Dons	20	5	0	15	10

Withdrawal (Record expunged) : Birmingham Hall Green

== Fixtures & results ==
Home \ Away	BHG	BPB	COV	CP	HAR	LB	SOT	SB	WEM	WH	WC	WIM
B'ham Hall Green		n/a	n/a	23–18	n/a	30–12	n/a	n/a	n/a	n/a	n/a	n/a
B'ham Perry Barr	n/a		24–38	26–16	26–17	34–29	17–25	19–44	30–33	35–28	30–33	37–26
Coventry	19–23	45–18		46–17	39–24	27–36	44–19	32–31	27–14	24–17	49–14	39–24
Crystal Palace	27–14	45–18	38–25		39–23	34–29	19–23	29–34	42–21	28–35	34–29	23–19
Harringay	15–27	25–35	28–35	37–25		27–15	37–26	27–36	24–38	30–33	29–34	42–21
Lea Bridge	n/a	27–36	29–33	31–32	42–20		26–16	14–28	30–33	44–18	44–19	30–33
Southampton	18–24	22–19	34–29	39–24	42–21	47–16		33–30	43–20	44–19	48–15	45–18
Stamford Bridge	n/a	50–13	44–19	45–18	53–10	33–9	39–24		33–9	45–17	43–20	53–10
Wembley	n/a	42–21	37–26	23–40	30–33	41–21	22–40	16–26		29–12	39–24	48–15
West Ham	32–10	40–23	31–11	25–38	28–14	35–28	31–32	30–33	31–32		34–29	38–25
White City	n/a	44–19	30–33	17–24	28–35	37–26	29–33	33–30	25–17	22–20		34–28
Wimbledon	n/a	13–28	25–38	23–19	28–35	26–16	26–37	26–37	27–36	45–18	36–27	

Legend: Blue = home team win; Yellow = draw; Red = away team win.

== Top Five Riders ==
		Team	C.M.A.
1	Johnny Lloyd	Hall Green	10.80
2	Jack Parker	Coventry	10.76
3	Gus Kuhn	Stamford Bridge	10.28
4	Jim Kempster	Wimbledon Dons	10.00
5	Colin Watson	White City	9.81

== Riders and averages ==
Birmingham Hall Green (withdrew)

- Johnny Lloyd 10.80
- George Povey 7.00
- Cyril Taft 6.86
- Bunny Wilcox 6.86
- Cyril Locke 6.43
- Tommy Cross 3.60
- Bill Stanley 0.75

Birmingham (Perry Barr)

- Wally Lloyd 7.20
- Arthur Johnson 6.27
- Norman Burton 5.00
- Georg Britt 4.50
- Les Patrick 4.20
- Geoff Siddaway 4.20
- Joe Dallison 3.50
- Johnny Lloyd 3.00
- Bill Ashcroft 3.00
- Tim Reid 2.05

Coventry

- Jack Parker 10.76
- Wilmot Evans 7.16
- Fred Wilkinson 7.15
- Tom Farndon 6.73
- Dilly Gittins 6.69
- Arthur Tims 6.53
- Norman Parker 6.35
- Lew Lancaster 6.17
- John Deeley 5.05
- Cyril Lord 5.00
- George Allbrook 4.83
- Bill Stanley 4.22
- Arthur Sanders 2.00

Crystal Palace

- Triss Sharp 9.73
- Wally Harris 7.50
- Bryan Donkin 6.51
- Joe Francis 4.98
- Arthur Willmott 4.98
- George Lovick 4.93
- Jack Barrett 4.67

Harringay

- Eric Spencer 9.64
- Stan Spencer 6.55
- Reg Pointer 6.28
- Alf Medcalf 4.68
- Lou Burger 4.43
- Will Dennis 4.32
- Ray Parsons 4.29
- Leonard Dicky Bird 4.20
- Bill Crouch 3.00
- Bert Gerrish 0.67

Lea Bridge

- Alf Foulds 8.12
- Jimmy Stevens 7.70
- Tommy Croombs 6.00
- Stew Fairbairn 4.29
- Harold Osment 4.20
- Roy Dook 4.15
- Frank Bond 4.11
- Eric Parry 3.50
- Alec Slow 3.14
- Alf Merrell 3.00

Southampton

- Eric Lister 8.90
- Tommy Cullis 8.51
- Clarrie Eldridge 8.15
- Vic Collins 7.30
- Col Stewart 6.30
- Jimmy Hayes 6.71
- Don Durant 5.50
- Albert Wakerley 5.40
- Jimmy Pink 5.33
- Cecil Bounds 4.80
- Ernie Rickman 4.25

Stamford Bridge

- Gus Kuhn 10.28
- Bert Bolt 8.48
- Colin Ford 8.11
- Wal Phillips 7.64
- Dick Bellamy 7.50
- Les Blakebrough 7.13
- Arthur Warwick 7.00
- Fred Ralph 6.88
- Bill White 6.60
- Nick Nicol 4.41
- Bill Bragg 4.33

Wembley

- Jack Ormston 8.25
- Buster Frogley 8.17
- Stan Catlett 7.76
- Bert Fairweather 6.24
- Len Reeve 5.79
- Ron Hieatt 5.09
- Jack Jackson 4.86
- Vic Deale 3.43
- Crawley Rous 3.00
- Nobby Key 1.00

West Ham

- John Williams 7.62
- Tiger Stevenson 7.54
- Don Durant 7.15
- Den Taylor 5.75
- Jack Adams 5.64
- Reg Bounds 5.60
- Bruce McCallum 5.50
- Ivor Creek 4.80
- Maurice Bradshaw 4.00
- Bluey Wilkinson 3.60
- Buzz Hibberd 3.18
- Les Maguire 5.74

White City

- Colin Watson 9.81
- Harold Crook 6.65
- Del Forster 6.22
- Clem Cort 5.28
- Hilary Buchanan 5.21
- Larry Coffey 4.80
- Fred Hore 4.36
- Leonard Dicky Bird 3.29
- Frank Ewen 3.09

Wimbledon

- Jim Kempster 10.00
- Mart Sieffert 7.83
- Jimmy Stevens 6.75
- Cecil Brown 6.20
- Alf Sawford 5.71
- Les Dearth 4.86
- Dudley Cox 4.36
- Alf Summersby 4.24
- Jack Kidwell 4.11
- Eddie Slade-Jones 3.46
- Fred Osborne 3.00
- Sid Chambers 2.45
- Rube Sonny Wilson 1.62

== See also ==
List of United Kingdom Speedway League Champions
