= Leeds Lions =

Defunct motorcycle speedway team

Club information
- Track address: Fullerton Park; Leeds
- Country: England
- Founded: 1928
- Closed: 1938
- League: Northern League; National League

Major team honours
Northern League Champions	1929

Leeds Lions are a defunct British motorcycle speedway team who were based at Fullerton Park Sports Stadium, adjacent to the Elland Road football ground in Leeds, England.

== History ==
=== Origins ===
The city of Leeds first experienced the sport of speedway at a little known track at Post Hill on 9 April 1928. Organised by the Leeds Motor Club events were held at the foot of Post Hill. Later that year on 13 October, speedway was introduced to Fullerton Park, following an earlier inspection by the Auto-Cycle Union. The introduction of speedway at Fullerton Park in 1928 included a team fixture against Middlesbrough and seemed to end the planned expansion of the Post Hill track.

=== Team ===
League racing first took place in 1929 with the formation of the English Dirt Track League, effectively a Northern League, which ran alongside the Southern League. The inaugural season started with a home win against Barnsley on 29 March and the Leeds team went on to win the league title. Their success was helped by the withdrawal of White City (Manchester) who were leading the league but failed to complete the season. The 1929 league winning team included riders such as George Greenwood, Arthur Atkinson and the Langton brothers Eric and Oliver.

After a season when Fullerton Park opted not to field a team, the club competed in the 1931 Speedway Northern League finishing second. The subsequent season saw the merger of the Northern and Southern Leagues to form the National League but Leeds di not participate. Despite a few fixtures being held at Fullerton Park in 1932, speedway would cease until 1938.

The team's final appearance was in the 1938 Speedway National League Division Two, where they finished 9th.

== Season summary ==
Year and league	Position	Notes
1929 Speedway English Dirt Track League	1st	Champions
1931 Speedway Northern League	2nd	
1938 Speedway National League Division Two	9th	

== Notable riders ==
- (England) Arthur Atkinson
- (England) Gordon Byers
- (England) Frank Charles
- (England) Tommy Gamble
- (England) George Greenwood
- (England) Eric Langton
- (England) Oliver Langton
- (Australia) Cliff Watson
