= Jack Chapman (speedway rider) =

Australian motorcycle speedway rider

- Born: 3 March 1907; Adelaide, Australia
- Died: 14 February 1994 (aged 86); City of Norwood Payneham & St Peters, Adelaide
- Nationality: Australian

Career history
- 1930: Sheffield Blades
- 1932: Stamford Bridge Pensioners
- 1933: Wimbledon Dons
- 1933: Nottingham
- 1934: Birmingham Bulldogs
- 1939: Harringay Tigers
- 1939: Edinburgh Thistles

Individual honours
- 1930: Australian champion (3 lap)

Team honours
- 1932: National Association Trophy

Wenley Jack Chapman (3 March 1907 – 14 February 1994) was an Australian motorcycle speedway rider. He earned 17 official and unofficial international caps for the Australia national speedway team.

== Biography ==
Chapman, born in Adelaide, was credited with holding the world mile record in 1928. He was one of the early pioneers of speedway, particularly in the United Kingdom, when he travelled over from Australia for the second season of the sport in 1929.

After making one just cup appearance for the Sheffield in 1929, Chapman returned home for the 1930 Australian season and became the 1930 Australian champion over 3 laps. He began his British leagues career riding for Sheffield Blades during the 1930 Speedway Northern League season. He averaged 8.41 for the Sheffield team.

Chapman missed the 1931 season but joined Stamford Bridge Pensioners in 1932, a season where he also captained the Australian select team.

In 1933, Chapman rode for Nottingham and also made a couple of appearances for Wimbledon Dons. However, in 1934, the entire Nottingham team was transferred to the Birmingham Bulldogs, following the demise of the Nottingham team.

After the 1934 season, Chapman returned home once again but this time stayed in Australia, selling Motorcycles in Adelaide. Five years later in 1939, Chapman now aged 32, made a comeback, joining the Harringay Tigers, before finishing his UK career with Edinburgh Thistles, operating at Marine Gardens in Portobello.
