= Bob Harrison (speedway rider) =

British motorcycle speedway rider

- Born: 26 April 1906; Mellor, England
- Died: 1 January 1965 (aged 58); Perth, Western Australia
- Nationality: British (English)

Career history
- 1929–1939, 1949: Belle Vue Aces
- 1946–1949: West Ham Hammers

Team honours
- 1933, 1934, 1935, 1936: National League Champion
- 1933, 1935, 1936, 1937, 1949: National Trophy Winner
- 1930, 1931: Northern League Champion
- 1934, 1935, 1936, 1937: A.C.U. Cup Winner
- 1939: British Speedway Cup winner

Robert Edwin Harrison (26 April 1906 in Mellor – 1 January 1965) was an international speedway rider who featured in the first Speedway World Championship in final in 1936.

== Career summary ==
Harrison started his career with the Belle Vue Aces in 1929 and stayed with them until the outbreak of World War II in 1939. In 1930, he made his England debut in the first ever Test series against Australia. Harrison was in the Aces team that won the National League championship four times in succession from 1933 to 1936. They also won the National Trophy four times between 1933 and 1937.

In 1937, Harrison while riding for Belle Vue Aces, broke his left leg on the same night that teammate Stan Hart (who was riding for Belle Vue Merseysiders in a Provincial league match) was killed.

After the war, Harrison was allocated to the West Ham Hammers by the Speedway Control Board. He scored well for the Hammers but a serious injury in 1947 affected him badly. A poor season in 1948 left Harrison contemplating retirement. After one meeting for West Ham in the 1949 season, he transferred back to the Belle Vue Aces where he helped them win the National Trophy.

Harrison retired from racing at the end of the 1949 season. At retirement, he had earned ten international caps for England.

== World Final Appearances ==
- 1936 - (England) London, Wembley Stadium - 12th - 5pts + 10 semi-final points
- 1937 - (England) London, Wembley Stadium - 17th - 7 semi-final points

== Players cigarette cards ==
Harrison is listed as number 19 of 50 in the 1930s Player's cigarette card collection.
