= Warrington (speedway) =

Motorcycle speedway team

Club information
- Track address: Arpley Motordrome; Slutchers Lane; Arpley; Warrington, England
- Country: England
- Founded: 1929
- Closed: 1930
- League: English Dirt Track League; Northern League

Warrington Speedway were a British motorcycle speedway team who operated between 1929 and 1930 and were based at Arpley Motordrome, Slutchers Lane, Arpley, Warrington, England.

== History ==
In 1928 the new sport known as dirt track arrived from Australia and the following year a dirt track was opened at Arpley Motordrome, with the Warrington team being founder members of the English Dirt Track League (effectively the Northern League).

The Arpley Motordrome first opened for speedway on 29 March 1929. The first meeting saw Squib Burton win the Golden Helmet in front of over 10,000 people. The promotion soon ran into trouble in November 1930 the speedway went into liquidation. The team's assets (including the venue) were taken over by the management of the Liverpool speedway team (General Speedways (Liverpool) Ltd for £1,100. However, following a court battle, Liverpool were forced to relinquish the assets to a higher bidder.

The stadium found new tenants in 1931 after a greyhound track was added and the venue became the Warrington Greyhound Stadium. Many years later in 1949 the venue held speedway demonstration meetings.

== Season summary ==
Year and league	Position	Notes
1929 Speedway English Dirt Track League	N/A	withdrew, results expunged
1930 Speedway Southern League	5th	
