= Wombwell Colliers =

Motorcycle speedway team

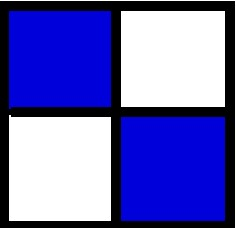

Club information
- Track address: South Yorkshire Sports Stadium; Station Road; Wombwell near Barnsley
- Country: England
- Founded: 1929
- Closed: 1965
- League: Northern League; National League

Wombwell Colliers were a British motorcycle speedway team who operated between 1929 and 1965 based at the South Yorkshire Sports Stadium, Station Road, Wombwell, near Barnsley, England.

== History ==
In 1928 the new sport known as dirt track arrived from Australia and the following year in February 1929, two speedway dirt tracks were laid out in Wombwell within 200 yards of each other. The first by the Darfield and District Motorcycle Club, on an old coursing field, off Ings Road, New Scarborough and the other at the greyhound racing stadium known as the South Yorkshire Sports Stadium.

The Ings Road track lasted one year and only held open meetings in 1929. The South Yorkshire Sports Stadium opened on 9 May 1929 and 8,000 people saw New Zealand rider Smokey Stratton open the track with a demonstration ride. The Stadium held open meetings in 1929 and then entered a team in the 1930 Speedway Northern League where they finished in 13th place.

The team did not compete in league fixtures during the 1931 Speedway Northern League season but did participate in the National Trophy.

In February 1932 the end of speedway was confirmed because the circuit was converted to accommodate a new greyhound racing track, which had been the original purpose of the track back in 1928.

After World War II the Wombwell public were keen for speedway to return and formed a Supporters Club in January 1947, which was duly followed by the construction of a speedway oval around the greyhound racing track ready for the 1947 Speedway National League Division Three season.

A seventh place finish in 1947 was followed by a last place finish during the 1948 Speedway National League Division Three season.

The team disbanded after the 1948 season.

== Season summary ==
| Year and league | Position | Notes |
|---|---|---|
| 1930 Speedway Northern League | 13th | |
| 1947 Speedway National League Division Three | 7th | |
| 1948 Speedway National League Division Three | 12th | |
