= Eric Langton =

British motorcycle speedway rider

- Born: 27 September 1907; Leeds, England
- Died: 10 November 1999 (aged 92); Perth, Australia
- Nationality: British (English)

Career history
- 1929: Leeds
- 1930-1947: Belle Vue Aces

Individual honours
- 1932: Star Riders' Champion
- 1935: Tom Farndon Memorial winner

Team honours
- 1933, 1934, 1935, 1936: National League Champion
- 1929: English Dirt Track League Champion
- 1930, 1931: Northern League Champion
- 1933, 1934, 1935, 1936, 1937, 1946, 1947: National Trophy winner
- 1931: Northern KO Cup winner
- 1934, 1935, 1936, 1937, 1946: A.C.U. Cup winner
- 1939: British Speedway Cup winner

Eric Kemp Langton (27 September 1907 – 10 November 1999) was an English motorcycle speedway who won the Star Riders' Championship in 1932, the forerunner to the Speedway World Championship. He earned 44 international caps for the England national speedway team.

== League career ==
Born in Leeds, England in 1907, Langton won the 1928 Scott Trial and raced in the senior 1927 and 1928 Isle of Man TT. Langton began his career at the Belle Vue track. He rode for Leeds in the 1929 season before returning to Belle Vue the following year, remaining with the club for the rest of his career. He won the Star Riders' Championship in 1932 and also finished runner-up in 1934. He was part of the Belle Vue team that won the League Championship six times in seven years and the National Trophy five times in a row in the 1930s. After retiring from the sport, he returned to Belle Vue in May 1946 to replace the injured Bill Pitcher, scoring a full maximum in his first match back, averaging 10.93 in his comeback season and finishing fourth in the British Riders Championship, the team also winning the National Trophy again that year.

== 1936 World Final ==
Eric Langton (left) congratulating Van Praag after winning the 1936 World Final Race off

After reaching the 1936 World final, Langton lost the run-off for the inaugural Speedway World Championship to Lionel Van Praag in somewhat controversial circumstances. The Championship was decided by bonus points accumulated in previous rounds. Despite being unbeaten in the final, Bluey Wilkinson was not crowned Champion. Bonus points accumulated by Langton and Van Praag took them to the top of the standings and into a run-off (Match Race). As they lined up at the tapes, Langton broke them which would ordinarily lead to disqualification. However, Van Praag stated he did not want to win the title by default and insisted that a race should take place. At the restart, Langton made it to the first bend in front and led until the final bend on the last lap when Van Praag darted through the smallest of gaps to win by less than wheel length.

Afterwards, controversial allegations were abound that the two riders had 'fixed' the match race, deciding between them that the first person to the first bend would win the race and the Championship and split the prize money; Langton led into the first bend but was overtaken by Van Praag. Van Praag reportedly paid Langton £50 "conscience money" after the race for going back on the agreement.

== Family and retirement ==
Langton's brother Oliver was also a speedway rider and was capped by England once. Eric built bikes to his own specifications, which were in widespread use around the world for many years after his speedway retirement. He eventually emigrated to Perth, Australia. He died in Perth in 2001.

== World Final Appearances ==
- 1936 - (England) London, Wembley Stadium - 2nd - 26pts (lost run-off)
- 1937 - (England) London, Wembley Stadium - 10th - 16pts
- 1938 - (England) London, Wembley Stadium - 8th - 13pts

== Players cigarette cards ==
Langton is listed as number 27 of 50 in the 1930s Player's cigarette card collection.
