= Walthamstow Wolves =

Speedway team

Club information
- Track address: Walthamstow Stadium; Chingford Road; Walthamstow; London, England
- Country: England
- Founded: 1934
- Closed: 1951
- League: National League

Club facts
- Colours: Red, black and white
- Track size: 282 yards (258 m)

The Walthamstow Wolves were a speedway team which operated from 1934 and again from 1949 until their closure in 1951.

== History ==
The club opened in 1934 competing in the National League, when Lea Bridge were forced to find a new venue after their licence was revoked by the Speedway Control Board in late July. Walthamstow Wolves took on their last ten fixtures. They finished ninth in the 1934 Speedway National League.

After the 1934 season the Wolves were forced to relocate due to noise complaints and subsequent court proceedings. They moved to the Hackney Wick Stadium as the Hackney Wick Wolves.

League speedway returned to Wathamstow for the 1949 Speedway National League Division Two and the promotion spent a considerable sum signing riders. Wilf Jay was signed from Newcastle for £1,000 and Dick Geary joined from Fleetwood for £1,000. Despite the new signings the team struggled to attract good crowds due to being situated between Division one tracks at West Ham and Harringay.

The Wolves finished 6th that season and this was followed by two 5th place finishes in 1950 and 1951, before they finally closed in 1951 due to declining attendance and complaints of noise from local residents.

The track was later covered in tarmac for easier maintenance of the greyhound racing track. The stadium was sold in August 2008 and demolished to make way for a housing development.

== Season summary ==
Year and league	Position	Notes
1934 Speedway National League	9th	replaced Lea Bridge mid-season
1949 Speedway National League Division Two	6th	
1950 Speedway National League Division Two	5th	
1951 Speedway National League Division Two	5th	

== Notable riders ==
- (England) Jim Boyd
- (England) Squib Burton
- (Australia) Dicky Case
- (England) Harry Edwards
- (England) Dusty Haigh
- (England) Pete Lansdale
- (England) George Newton
- (England) Archie Windmill
