= Lea Bridge (speedway) =

Former British motorcycle speedway team

Lea Bridge Clapton Saints Lea Bridge Cubs

Club information
- Track address: Lea Bridge Stadium; Lea Bridge Road; Walthamstow; London
- Country: England
- Founded: 1928
- Closed: 1938
- League: Southern League; National League

Lea Bridge also known as Clapton Saints were a British speedway team that existed from 1928 to 1938. They raced at the Lea Bridge Stadium.

== History ==
=== Origins ===
Speedway was introduced in the Summer of 1928 by Motor Speedways Ltd, under the guidance of the Managing Director Ernest J. Bass and track manager Ray Abbott, following the construction of a purpose built facility on a ten acre plot of land. The 33ft wide track was built with a football field on the inside and the stadium could accommodate 40,000 spectators. There was parking for cars and one of the four stadium entrances was directly opposite the Lea Bridge railway station. The first fixture was held to the Lea Bridge Stadium on 14 July 1928

=== Team ===
Fixtures continued to be held throughout 1928 including a team challenge against the original White City team. The following season a team was formed with the purpose of racing in the 1929 Speedway Southern League and they finished 10th place in the 11 team league. The team fared better the following season, finishing 8th from 13 before Cyril "Squib" Burton became the club's first big signing, starring during the 1931 Speedway Southern League season.

The Southern and Northern Leagues merged to create the first National League in 1932. However, the team ceased to become members of the league because Mr Bass had installed a tote and indicated that they would allow betting on Speedway meetings, which forced the National Speedway Association to withdraw the team from the league. In May 1932, the Southampton Saints promotion left Banister Court Stadium to take over the licence at Lea Bridge, with the team becoming the Clapton Saints. Led by the Parker brothers, Jack and Norman, the Saints finished in a solid fifth place in 1933.

In 1934, the team reverted to the name Lea Bridge but were unable to fulfill their fixtures, which resulted in their licence being revoked. The fixtures were completed by Walthamstow Wolves.

In July 1938, Tom Bradbury Pratt was granted a licence to race in the 1938 Speedway National League Division Two, under the name of Lea Bridge Cubs. The team made up largely of Harringay reserve riders would finish the league in 5th place. It would be their final season in existence.

=== Site today ===
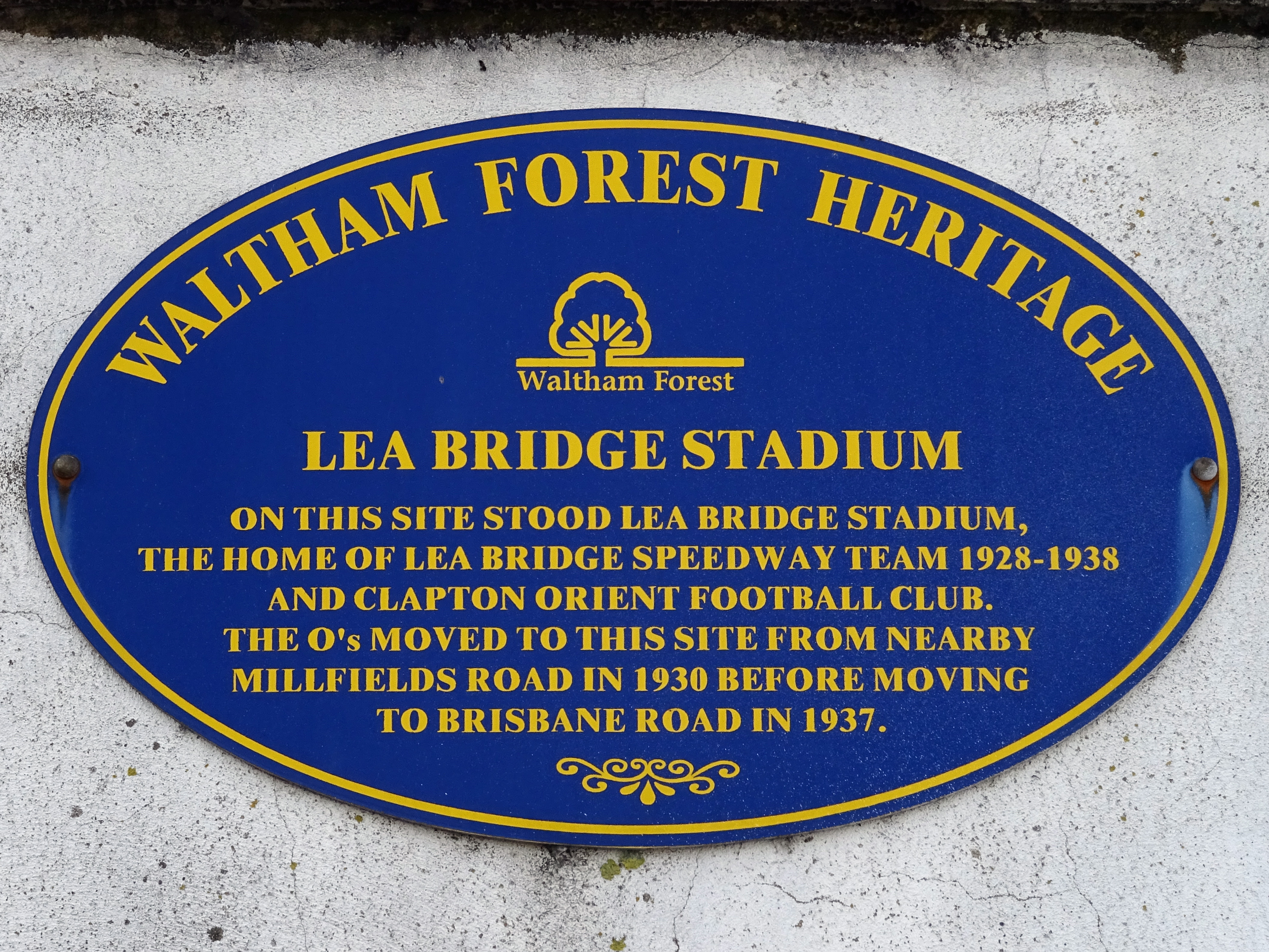
Blue plaque erected by Waltham Forest Council as part of the Waltham Forest Heritage scheme at 24 Rigg Approach

The stadium site today is commemorated by a blue plaque at nearby Rigg Approach.

== Notable riders ==
- Cyril "Squib" Burton
- Billy Dallison
- Dusty Haigh
- Jack Parker
- Norman Parker

== Season summary ==
Year and league	Team name	Position	Notes
1929 Speedway Southern League	Lea Bridge	10th	
1930 Speedway Southern League	Lea Bridge	8th	
1931 Speedway Southern League	Lea Bridge	9th	
1932 Speedway National League	Clapton Saints	8th	
1933 Speedway National League	Clapton Saints	5th	
1934 Speedway National League	Lea Bridge	9th+	fixtures taken over by Walthamstow Wolves
1938 Speedway National League Division Two	Lea Bridge Cubs	5th	
