= Cyril "Squib" Burton =

British motorcycle speedway rider

Cyril Burton
- Born: 16 January 1908; Cossington, Leicestershire, England
- Died: June 1990; Leicestershire, England
- Nationality: British (English)

Career history
- 1929: Rochdale
- 1930-1931: Leicester Stadium
- 1931, 1934: Lea Bridge Saints
- 1932-1933: Sheffield
- 1934: Walthamstow Wolves
- 1935: Hackney Wick Wolves

Cyril Frederick "Squib" Burton (16 January 1908 – June 1990) was a motorcycle speedway rider who was one of the sport's early stars, becoming a leading rider for the Leicester Stadium team and for Rochdale, and going on to represent England.

== Biography ==
Burton was born in Cossington, Leicestershire in 1908. His small size as a child led to him being given the nickname "Squib", although as an adult he stood at 6 ft 1in tall. He began his speedway career at Coventry's Foleshill track, transferring to Leicester in Autumn 1928 where he rode in the novice class. He soon progressed to senior racing, transferring to Rochdale, and won several individual competitions in 1929, including breaking the world record for four laps of track over a quarter of a mile in length with a time of 89.4 seconds. In 1930 he moved back to the Leicester Stadium team, finishing as the team's top rider in 1930 and transferring to Lea Bridge in 1931 when Leicester folded. He first raced in international competition in 1930, as part of the England team that faced Australia for all but the first of the five-test series. He also toured New Zealand as part of the England test team in the Winter of 1930–31. Burton also competed as part of the England team in the first two tests of 1931 against Australia and the final test of 1933. He rode for Sheffield in 1932 and 1933, back to Lea Bridge for 1934 and when they folded onto Walthamstow Wolves in July of that year before moving with the promotion to Hackney Wick Wolves in 1935.

A series of injuries led to Burton retiring from speedway, although he went on to race midget cars in the late 1930s. At retirement he had earned 7 international caps for the England national speedway team.

Burton also won the first race to be held at Donington Park, held on Whit Monday 1931; The bike on which he won is now exhibited in the National Motorcycle Museum. Fifty years later, he donated his trophy from that race to the Donington Park Racing Association Club. It was subsequently known as the Squib Burton Challenge Trophy and awarded to the highest scoring British rider at the British Superstock Championship rounds at Donington.

In 1950, Burton became the manager of the Leicester Hunters speedway team.

Burton also ran a garage in Lutterworth, where he also acted as a magistrate.

Squib's son, John "Burly" Burton, was a top scrambling rider of the 1950s, and 1960s.
