= Joe Abbott (speedway rider) =

English speedway rider

- Born: 12 April 1902; Burnley, England
- Died: 1 July 1950 (aged 48); Bradford, England
- Nationality: British (English)

Career history
- 1928–1929: Burnley
- 1929–1931: Preston
- 1932–1937, 1939: Belle Vue Aces
- 1947: Harringay Racers
- 1947–1950: Odsal Boomerangs

Team honours
- 1929: English Dirt Track KO Cup Winner
- 1933, 1934, 1935, 1936: National League Champion
- 1933, 1934, 1935, 1936: National Trophy Winner
- 1934, 1935, 1936, 1937: A.C.U. Cup Winner
- 1939: British Speedway Cup Winner

John Patrick Abbott (12 April 1902 in Burnley, England – 1 July 1950) was an international motorcycle speedway rider who rode in the World Championship final in 1937.

== Career summary ==
Abbott began his career with local track Burnley in 1928 before moving onto Preston for two seasons. He then joined the Belle Vue Aces and stayed there until the outbreak of World War II. At Belle Vue, he formed a formidable partnership with Frank Charles, which they utilised internationally. He made fifteen appearances for England between 1930 and 1939 and qualified for a World Final and earned 30 caps by the end of his career.

After the war, Abbott became captain of the Harringay Racers in 1947 and transferred to the Odsal Boomerangs in Bradford towards the end of the 1947 season.

On 21 June 1949, Abbott was riding in live televised meeting at West Ham Stadium against the West Ham Hammers. He crashed and suffered serious injury, but in the crowd were dozens of ambulance men from Poplar hospital who rushed him there immediately. The quick actions saved his life.

== World Final appearances ==
- 1937 – (England) London, Wembley Stadium – 13th – 14pts

== Death ==
On 1 July 1950 in the National League match for the Boomerangs against West Ham Hammers, Abbott, who was now 48 years old, fell in his second race and was hit by a following rider and was instantly killed. The riders and promoters decided to carry on with the meeting, as they believed Joe would have wished it. Fans left Odsal Stadium unaware that Abbott, with nicknames such as 'India-rubber Man', and "Ironman", had died.

== Players cigarette cards ==
Abbott is listed as number 1 of 50 in the 1930s Player's cigarette card collection.

== See also ==
- Rider deaths in motorcycle speedway
