= Belle Vue Aces =

British motorcycle speedway team

Club information
- Track address: National Speedway Stadium; Kirkmanshulme Lane; Gorton; Manchester
- Country: England
- Founded: 1928
- Team manager: Mark Lemon
- Team captain: Brady Kurtz
- League: SGB Premiership
- Website: www.bellevue-speedway.com

Club facts
- Colours: Red, White and Black
- Track size: 347 metres
- Track record time: 58.18 secs
- Track record date: 26 August 2019 vs King's Lynn
- Track record holder: Dan Bewley

Current team
| Rider | CMA |
|---|---|
| (England) Dan Bewley |
| (Germany) Norick Blödorn |
| (Denmark) Peter Kildemand |
| (Australia) Zach Cook |
| (Australia) Tate Zischke |
| (England) Will Cairns |

Major team honours
| United Kingdom Champions | 1930, 1931, 1933, 1934, 1935, 1936, 1963, 1970, 1971, 1972, 1982, 1993, 2022, 2024, 2026 |
| Knockout Cup Winners | 1972, 1973, 1975, 2005, 2017 |
| Pairs Winners | 1984, 2006, 2023 |
| National Trophy Winners | 1933, 1934, 1935, 1936, 1937, 1946, 1947, 1949, 1958 |
| Northern KO Cup Winners | 1931 |
| A.C.U Cup Winners | 1934, 1935, 1936, 1937, 1939, 1946 |
| British League Cup Winners | 1983 |
| English Speedway Trophy (Reserves) | 1938 |
| Britannia Shield | 1957, 1958, 1960 |
| Midland Development League Champions | 2013 |

The Belle Vue Aces are a British speedway club, based in Manchester. The club hold the record of having won the top tier League championship 15 times. They currently compete in the SGB Premiership, racing at the National Speedway Stadium, with home matches usually taking place on Monday evenings.

== History ==
=== Origins ===
Racing in Belle Vue first took place on 28 July 1928 at the Belle Vue greyhound stadium in Kirkmanshulme Lane. Mr G. A. Hunting, manager of the International Speedways Ltd was the promoter but the season was restricted to various open meetings and there was no league structure. The season ended early in September following problems with the track surface.

The following year in 1929, the North Manchester Speedway Club, who had previously arranged fixtures for the International Speedways Ltd moved the speedway to the recently built 40,000 capacity Hyde Road stadium nearby on Hyde Road, which was the home ground of Manchester Central F.C. and which formed part of the Belle Vue Zoological Gardens.

=== Hyde Road Stadium ===
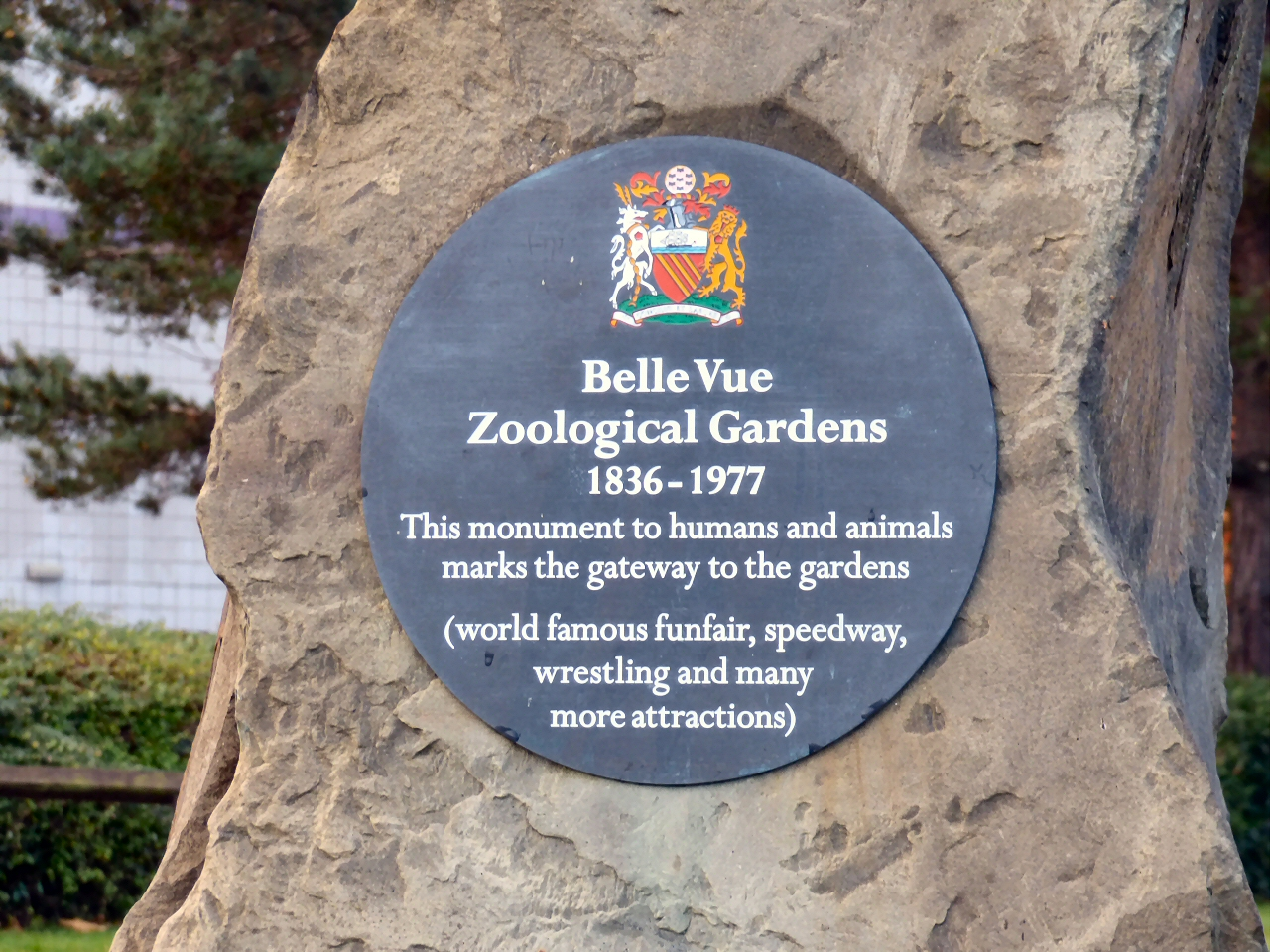
Plaque commemorating the Gardens and stadium

The purpose built 382 metres (418 yards) track was laid around the existing athletics and cycling track and the club secured the services of leading rider Arthur Franklyn as captain coach. The opening speedway meeting here was staged on 23 March 1929, when Arthur Franklyn won the Golden Helmet and the first league fixture was on 4 May, against Preston.

Belle Vue resigned from the English Dirt Track League) in 1929, stating that it wasn't popular enough but in 1930 and 1931, they were regarded as the champions of the Northern League on win rate percentage. In 1931, Belle Vue reserves took over Harringay's fixtures, after they had withdrawn from the Southern League. This meant the Aces had a team in both the Northern and Southern Leagues although they were often referred to as Manchester in the Southern League.

=== National league domination ===
The team joined the National League when it was formed in 1932, racing against the big London teams on a regular basis. They became the leading club in the country winning the title four times from 1933 to 1936, in addition to claiming five National Trophy wins and five A.C.U Cup wins. The Belle Vue team included riders such as Eric Langton, Frank Varey, Joe Abbott, Max Grosskreutz, Bob Harrison, Bill Kitchen and Frank Charles. Both Langton and Charles were winners of the Star Riders' Championship (the unofficial championship of the world).

In July 1937, the Liverpool Merseysiders promotion dropped out of the league and was replaced by the Belle Vue Aces promotion, led by Mr.E.C Spence and because Belle Vue already had a team in the National League they renamed the Provincial League team to Belle Vue Merseysiders.

=== War years ===
Belle Vue was the only track to continue operating throughout World War II, running a total of 176 meetings during the war years, which were attended by a total of 2,816,000 people. The winners of the wartime British Individual Championships were:

- 1940, 1941, 1942 Eric Chitty, 1943 Ron Clarke, 1944 Frank Varey, 1945 Bill Kitchen

=== 1950s ===
After the war, the team racing resumed, with the Aces taking their place in the 1946 National League and subsequently winning another National Trophy and ACU Cup double but then the domination was ended by Wembley Lions. There was sadness on 13 September 1947, when manager E.O. Spence died. Johnnie Hoskins took over from Alice Hart as promoter in 1953.

From 1946 to 1960, the Aces finished runner-up in the league no less than eight times, being denied by Wembley Lions for five of them. Jack Parker starred for the Aces during the period and he was joined by Ron Johnston and Peter Craven, the latter being crowned as world champion in 1955 when a Belle Vue rider.

=== 1960s ===
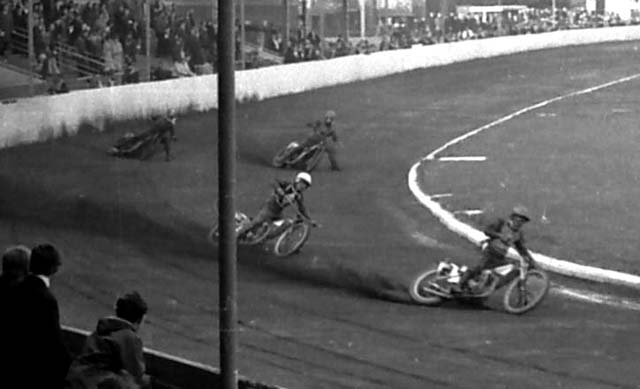
The Aces riding at Hyde Road during the eventful 1963 season

A change in promoter occurred in 1960, with Ken Sharples taking charge and Aces rider Peter Craven won a second world title in 1962. The Aces experienced a year that they would never forget in 1963, glory and tragedy ensued when the team won the league title but Peter Craven died, following a challenge match at Edinburgh's Old Meadowbank stadium, on 20 September 1963.

Harold Jackson took over as Speedway Manager in 1964, prior to the Aces becoming founder members of the new British League in 1965. Dent Oliver became the speedway manager in 1967, and remained in that position until 1973. Belle Vue Ove Fundin

=== 1970s ===
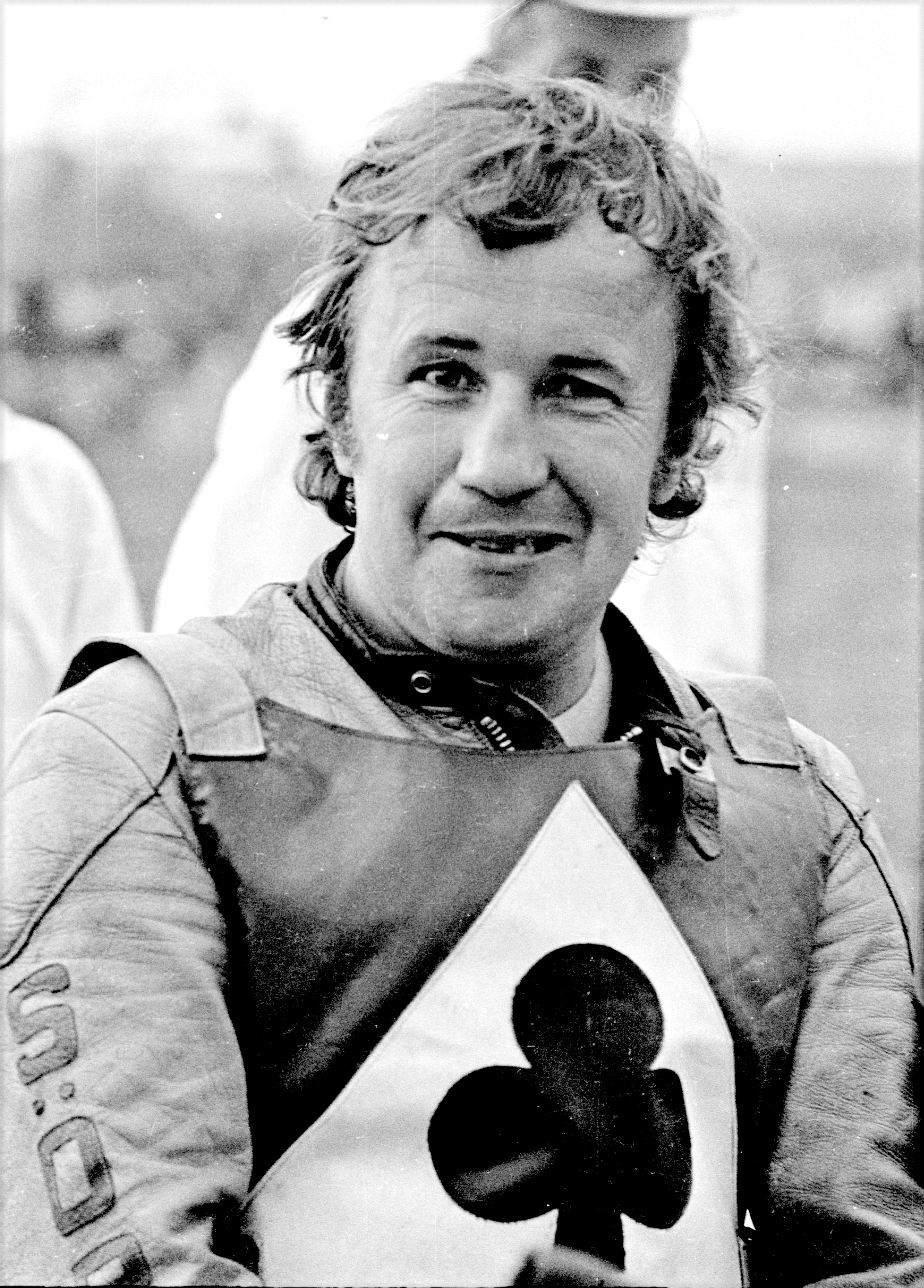
Sören Sjösten

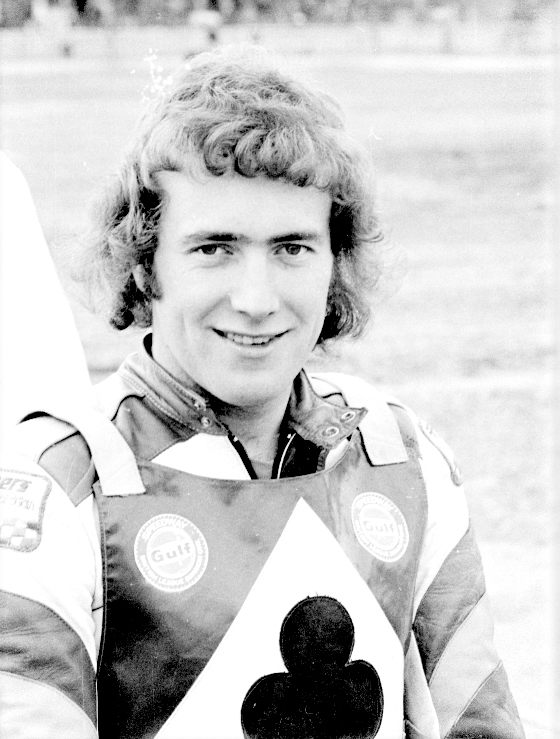
Peter Collins

The team had signed world champion Ivan Mauger in 1969 and supported by top Swede Sören Sjösten the Aces easily won the 1970 championship before going on to win three consecutive league titles and two Knockout Cups. They had been joined by Peter Collins for the 1972 title win.

Frank Varey took over as Speedway Manager in 1974, before Jack Fearnley took up the reins in 1974.

=== 1980s ===
In 1982, former World Stock-Car Champion Stuart Bamforth became promoter and the stadium was also used for Stock Car racing. The year of 1982 resulted in the Aces winning their 11th league title, the team was led by Chris Morton, although Peter Collins was still an integral part of the team.

Following the announcement that Stuart Bamforth had sold the stadium for redevelopment, the last speedway meeting was staged on 1 November 1987, when a double header took place. Firstly, Belle Vue defeated the Coventry Bees in a replay of the League Cup before losing to the Cradley Heath Heathens in the final league match ever raced at Hyde Road.

=== Kirkmanshulme Lane ===
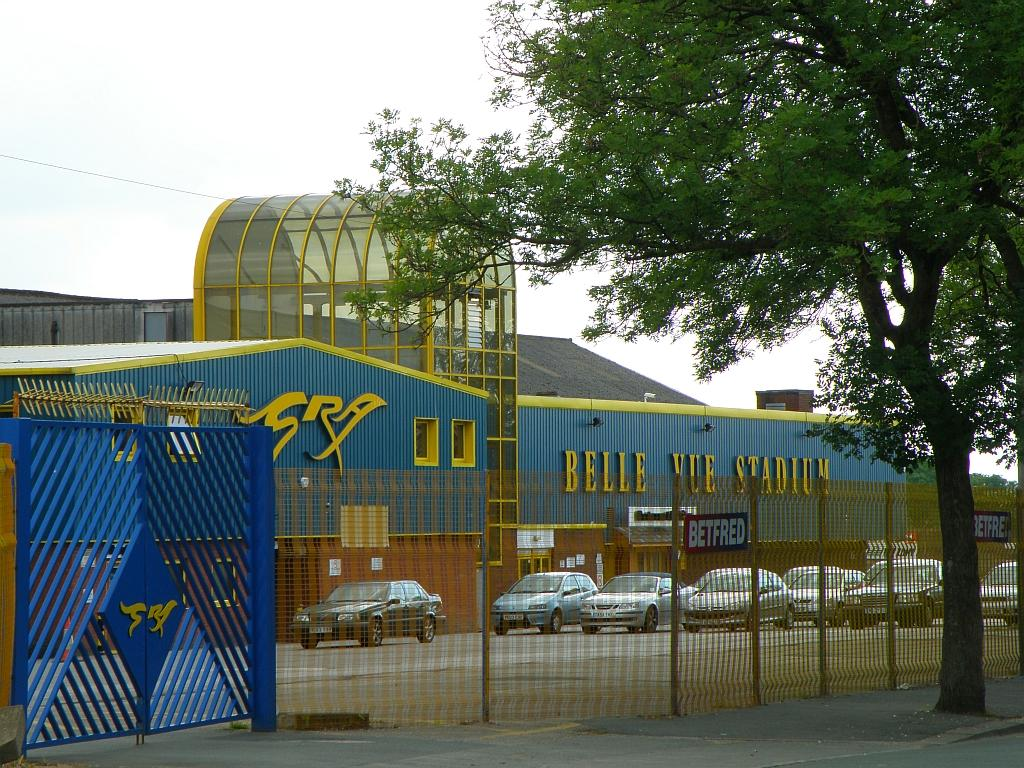

When the stadium at Hyde Road was sold in 1987, the Aces moved back to the Belle Vue Greyhound Stadium, under the promotion of Peter Collins, John Perrin and Don Bowes. The opening meeting of the new era of the Aces was held on 1 April 1988, and saw Belle Vue take on Bradford Dukes in the Frank Varey Northern Trophy. However, the match was abandoned after just two heats due to a waterlogged track (rain), with the Aces leading the match. Due to other commitments Collins resigned from his promotional position in 1989, leaving Perrin and Bowes in charge of the Aces.

=== 1990s ===
The next significant success arrived in 1993, when the Aces won the league title, led by 21-year-old, Joe Screen and well supported by Americans Bobby Ott and Shawn Moran and the Australian Jason Lyons. A further management change in 1994 saw George Carswell link with Perrin and Bowes as co-promoter and the following season a promoting change saw John Hall replace Don Bowes, to link up with Perrin and Carswell. The Premier League broke in two at the end of 1996, with the Aces becoming members of the new Elite League.

=== 2000s ===
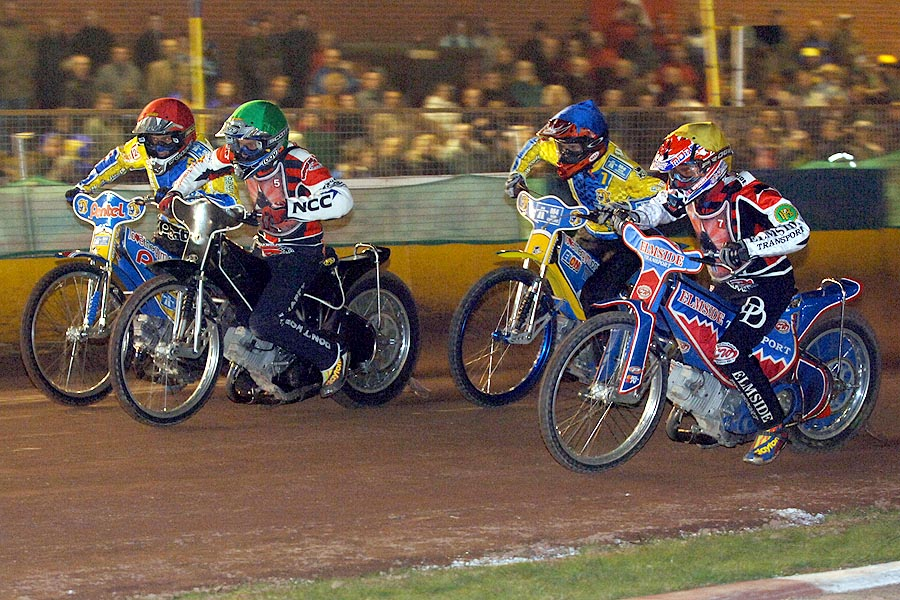
Belle Vue versus Oxford in 2007

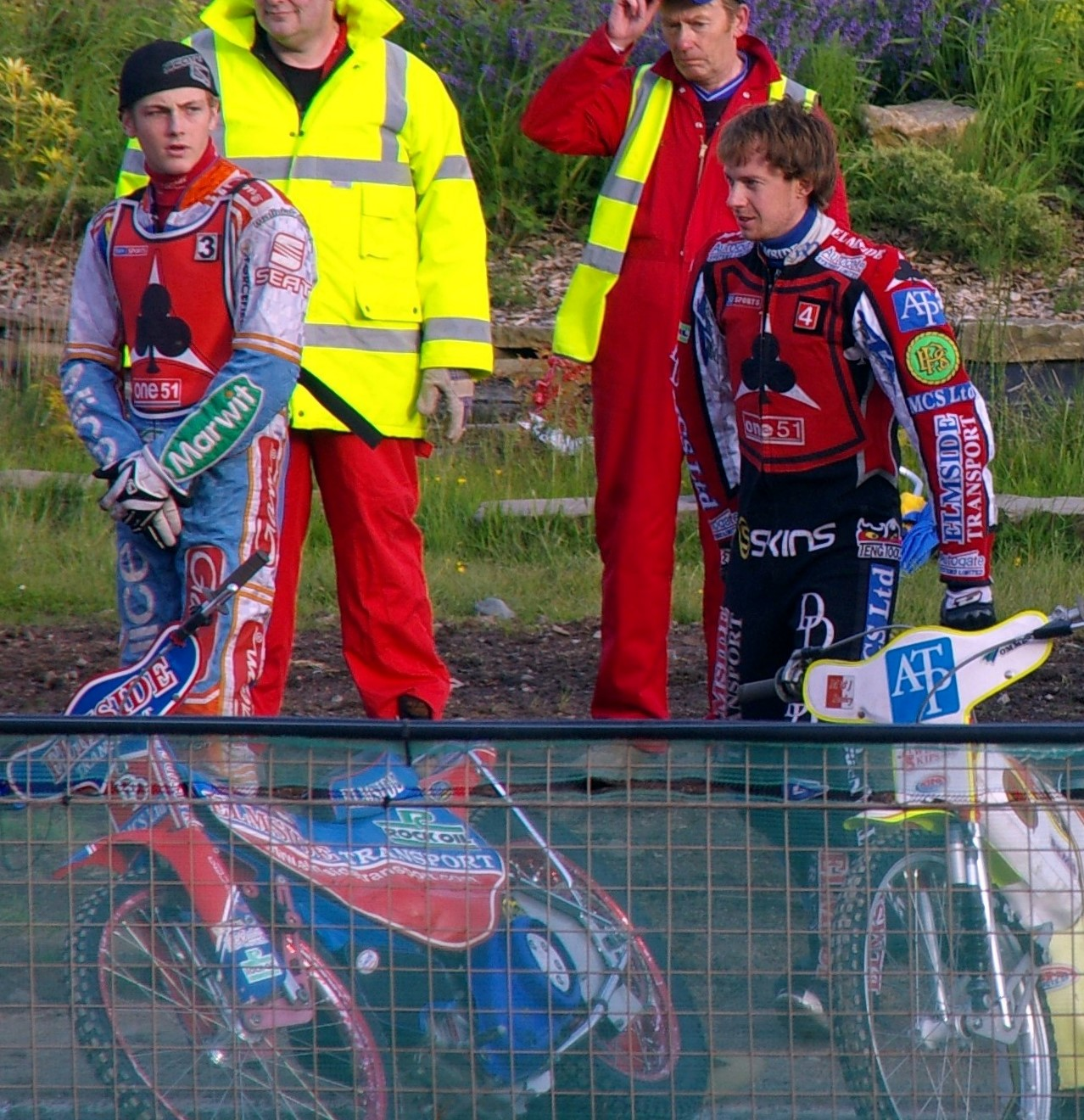
James Wright (right) with guest Darcy Ward (2009)

The next decade saw minimal success and a change of promotion occurred in late 2004 as John Perrin sold the club to Workington promoters Tony Mole and Ian Thomas. This was Thomas's second stint in charge of The Aces. In 2005, the team won the Knockout Cup led by Jason Crump and the pairs championship the following season before a further change in ownership occurred in December 2006 as ex-captain Chris Morton along with David Gordon bought the club from Tony Mole and Ian Thomas.

The team nearly ended the search for another league title after reaching the play-off final in 2015. It was also the team's last season at Kirkmanshulme Lane before moving to the newly built National Speedway Stadium in 2016.

=== National Speedway Stadium ===
The Aces moved to a new purpose-built stadium in Gorton in 2016, which also served as the national stadium for British speedway. Following early teething troubles with the track surface which led to meetings being postponed, the Belle Vue team had a successful season and finished the league programme at the top. However, the Aces lost to Wolverhampton Wolves in the two-leg play-off finals. They did however win the Knockout Cup in 2017.

=== 2020s ===
In 2022, the club ended a 29-year wait for their 13th league title after winning the SGB Premiership 2022. The Aces controversially brought in Robert Lambert as a late season injury replacement for Max Fricke and Lambert scored a 15 point maximum in the play off final 1st leg.

The Aces won their 14th league title by regaining the Premiership title in 2024 against the Leicester Lions, With Dan Bewley going unbeaten and scoring two maximums in both legs. Belle Vue then made it 15 Premiership titles defeating their Roses' rivals the Sheffield Tigers and also ended a 54 year wait to win the title in front of their own fans, having won their last championship in Manchester back in 1972.

== Full season summary ==
Extended content

| Year and league | League Position | Notes |
|---|---|---|
| 1929 Speedway English Dirt Track League | N/A | withdrew, results expunged |
| 1930 Speedway Northern League | 1st | champions |
| 1931 Speedway Northern League | 1st | champions |
| 1931 Speedway Southern League | 8th | took over fixtures of Harringay Canaries |
| 1932 Speedway National League | 3rd | |
| 1933 Speedway National League | 1st | champions & National Trophy |
| 1934 Speedway National League | 1st | champions, National Trophy & ACU Cup |
| 1935 Speedway National League | 1st | champions, National Trophy & ACU Cup |
| 1936 Speedway National League | 1st | champions, National Trophy & ACU Cup |
| 1937 Speedway National League | 4th | National Trophy & ACU Cup |
| 1938 Speedway National League | 5th | |
| 1939 Speedway National League | 1st+ | +when league suspended & National Trophy |
| 1946 Speedway National League | 2nd | National Trophy & ACU Cup |
| 1947 Speedway National League | 2nd | National Trophy |
| 1948 Speedway National League | 5th | |
| 1949 Speedway National League | 2nd | National Trophy |
| 1950 Speedway National League | 2nd | |
| 1951 Speedway National League | 2nd | |
| 1952 Speedway National League | 6th | |
| 1953 Speedway National League | 8th | |
| 1954 Speedway National League | 7th | |
| 1955 Speedway National League | 2nd | |
| 1956 Speedway National League | 5th | |
| 1957 Speedway National League | 2nd | |
| 1958 Speedway National League | 5th | National Trophy |
| 1959 Speedway National League | 9th | |
| 1960 Speedway National League | 2nd | |
| 1961 Speedway National League | 4th | |
| 1962 Speedway National League | 4th | |
| 1963 Speedway National League | 1st | champions |
| 1964 Speedway National League | 4th | |
| 1965 British League season | 14th | |
| 1966 British League season | 13th | |
| 1967 British League season | 16th | |
| 1968 British League season | 10th | |
| 1969 British League season | 2nd | |
| 1970 British League season | 1st | champions |
| 1971 British League season | 1st | champions |
| 1972 British League season | 1st | champions & Knockout Cup winners |
| 1973 British League season | 6th | Knockout Cup winners |
| 1974 British League season | 2nd | |
| 1975 British League season | 2nd | Knockout Cup winners |
| 1976 British League season | 2nd | |
| 1977 British League season | 5th | |
| 1978 British League season | 2nd | |
| 1979 British League season | 10th | |
| 1980 British League season | 3rd | |
| 1981 British League season | 4th | |
| 1982 British League season | 1st | champions |
| 1983 British League season | 5th | League Cup winners |
| 1984 British League season | 2nd | |
| 1985 British League season | 6th | |
| 1986 British League season | 10th | |
| 1987 British League season | 9th | |
| 1988 British League season | 2nd | |
| 1989 British League season | 4th | |
| 1990 British League season | 3rd | |
| 1991 British League season | 4th | |
| 1992 British League season | 6th | |
| 1993 British League season | 1st | champions |
| 1994 British League season | 11th | |
| 1995 Premier League speedway season | 2nd | |
| 1996 Premier League speedway season | 6th | |
| 1997 Elite League speedway season | 6th | |
| 1998 Elite League speedway season | 2nd | |
| 1999 Elite League speedway season | 6th | |
| 2000 Elite League speedway season | 9th | |
| 2001 Elite League speedway season | 9th | |
| 2002 Elite League speedway season | 8th | |
| 2003 Elite League speedway season | 7th | |
| 2004 Elite League speedway season | 7th | |
| 2005 Elite League speedway season | 1st | PO finalists & Knockout Cup winners |
| 2006 Elite League speedway season | 5th | Belle Vue Aces |
| 2007 Elite League speedway season | 10th | |
| 2008 Elite League speedway season | 7th | |
| 2009 Elite League speedway season | 9th | |
| 2010 Elite League speedway season | 8th | |
| 2011 Elite League speedway season | 7th | |
| 2012 Elite League speedway season | 10th | |
| 2013 Elite League speedway season | 9th | |
| 2014 Elite League speedway season | 8th | |
| 2015 Elite League speedway season | 4th | PO final |
| 2016 Elite League | 1st | PO final |
| SGB Premiership 2017 | 3rd | Knockout Cup winners |
| SGB Premiership 2018 | 4th | |
| SGB Premiership 2019 | 5th | |
| SGB Premiership 2021 | 3rd | PO final |
| SGB Premiership 2022 | 1st | Champions, won PO final |
| SGB Premiership 2023 | 1st | PO semi final, Pairs winners |
| SGB Premiership 2024 | 3rd | Champions |
| SGB Premiership 2025 | 4th | |

== Notable riders ==
- (England) Joe Abbott
- (England) Frank Charles
- (England) Peter Collins
- (England) Peter Craven
- (Australia) Jason Crump
- (England) Acorn Dobson
- (England) Dick Fisher
- (Australia) Max Fricke
- (Sweden) Ove Fundin
- (Australia) Max Grosskreutz
- (England) Bob Harrison
- (England) Wally Hull
- (New Zealand) Ron Johnston
- (England) Bill Kitchen
- (Australia) Brady Kurtz
- (England) Eric Langton
- (England) Oliver Langton
- (Australia) Jason Lyons
- (England) Cyril Maidment
- (New Zealand) Ivan Mauger
- (United States) Shawn Moran
- (England) Chris Morton
- (United States) Bobby Ott
- (England) Jack Parker
- (England) Chris Pusey
- (England) Joe Screen
- (Sweden) Sören Sjösten
- (England) Frank Varey
- (Slovenia) Matej Žagar

== Club honours ==
- League Champions – 1930 1931 1933 1934 1935 1936 1963 1970 1971 1972 1982 1993 2022 2024 2026
- Knock Out Cup Winners – 1931 1972 1973 1975 2005 2017
- Premiership Trophy – 1983
- League Cup Winners – 1983
- Inter-League Cup Winners – 1975
- National League – 1933 1934 1935 1936 1963
- National Trophy – 1933 1934 1935 1936 1937 1946 1947 1949 1958
- English Speedway Trophy Winners (Reserves) – 1938
- ACU Cup – 1934 1935 1936 1937 1946
- British Speedway Cup – 1939 1947
- British League Division Two Winners-Colts – 1968 1969
- Britannia Shield – 1957 1958 1960
- Northern League Champions – 1930 1931
- British League Division Two KO Cup Winners-Colts – 1969
- Northern KO Cup – 1931
- Four Team Championship Winners – 1992
- Youth Development League Winners – 2001
- Elite League Pairs Winners – 2006 (Simon Stead & Jason Crump)
- League Riders Winners – Ivan Mauger 1971 Peter Collins 1974 1975 Chris Morton 1984 Shawn Moran 1989 Joe Screen 1992 Jason Crump 2006 2008 Rory Schlein 2011

== See also ==
- Category:Belle Vue Aces riders
