= Northern League (speedway) =

Former British motorcycle speedway competition

- Formerly: English Dirt Track League
- Sport: Motorcycle speedway
- Founded: 1929
- Folded: 1931
- Replaced by: the National League
- Country: United Kingdom
- Most titles: Belle Vue

The Northern League was founded in 1929 when it was known as the English Dirt Track League, the earliest league (along with the Southern League) in speedway racing in the United Kingdom, comprising teams from Northern Britain. The addition of two Scottish teams prompted a name change in 1930. The league existed between 1929 and 1931, after which, with many teams folding, it was amalgamated with the Southern League to form the National League. In the 1929 season, White City (Manchester) won all 18 matches but resigned from the league after a dispute, leaving Leeds Lions as champions. The season was beset with problems with Warrington's expulsion, Bolton completing only one match before their fixtures were taken over by Hanley, and Long Eaton entering the league but not completing a match. Belle Vue won the league in both 1930 and 1931.

After World War II a one-off division 2 competition was held called the 1946 Speedway Northern League. This was effectively the National League Division 2 because it was sandwiched between the 1939 Speedway National League Division Two and the 1947 Speedway National League Division Two. Middlesbrough Bears were the winners.

== Champions ==
Season	Champions	Second
1929	Leeds Lions	Preston
1930	Belle Vue Aces	Liverpool Merseysiders
1931	Belle Vue Aces	Leeds Lions

== See also ==
List of United Kingdom Speedway League Champions
