= 1952 Speedway National League =

British speedway season

- League: National League Division One
- No. of competitors: 10
- Champions: Wembley Lions
- National Trophy: Harringay Racers
- London Cup: Harringay Racers
- Highest average: Ronnie Moore
- Division/s below: National League (Div 2); 1952 Southern League

The 1952 National League Division One was the 18th season of speedway in the United Kingdom and the seventh post-war season of the highest tier of motorcycle speedway in Great Britain.

== Summary ==
Norwich Stars joined the league. Wembley Lions won their fourth consecutive title and their seventh overall. Birmingham recorded their highest league finish to date by taking the runner-up spot.

While riding for Wimbledon, on 22 July 1952 the American Ernie Roccio was killed after crashing into the fence at high speed at West Ham Stadium, it has been reported that he died instantly but the newspaper report states he died in hospital.

== Final table ==
Pos	Team	PL	W	D	L	Pts
1	Wembley Lions	36	28	1	7	57
2	Birmingham Brummies	36	23	0	13	46
3	Harringay Racers	36	21	3	12	45
4	West Ham Hammers	36	18	2	16	38
5	Wimbledon Dons	36	17	2	17	36
6	Belle Vue Aces	36	18	0	18	36
7	New Cross Rangers	36	15	1	20	31
8	Bristol Bulldogs	36	13	0	23	26
9	Bradford Tudors	36	11	1	24	23
10	Norwich Stars	36	10	2	24	22

== Fixtures & results ==
=== A fixtures ===
Home \ Away	BV	BIR	BRA	BRI	HAR	NC	NOR	WEM	WH	WIM
Belle Vue		53–31	43–41	48–36	37–47	53–31	50–34	37–47	51–33	44–40
Birmingham	45–39		56–28	55–29	42–32	50–34	56–28	53–31	38–46	57–27
Bradford	53–31	37–47		53–31	29–54	55–29	56–28	45–38	38–46	47–37
Bristol	55–29	45–38	48–35		27–57	35–49	44–40	44–39	47–37	45–38
Harringay	57–26	48–36	58–26	45–39		50–34	53–31	42–42	45–39	51–33
New Cross	48–35	45–39	56–28	45–39	41–42		56–28	40–42	48–36	58–26
Norwich	51–32	39–45	42–42	54–30	47–36	36–46		37–47	51–32	44–40
Wembley	55–29	47–37	52–32	62–22	61–23	51–33	62–21		60–24	43–41
West Ham	52–31	41–43	47–37	55–28	46–38	43–40	49–35	48–33		43–41
Wimbledon	47–36	49–34	52–29	56–28	43–41	49–35	62–22	29–54	59–25	

Legend: Blue = home team win; Yellow = draw; Red = away team win.

=== B fixtures ===
Home \ Away	BV	BIR	BRA	BRI	HAR	NC	NOR	WEM	WH	WIM
Belle Vue		46–38	46–38	48–36	44–39	48–35	53–31	41–43	49–35	56–28
Birmingham	48–35		57–27	53–31	52–32	49–35	51–32	55–29	47–37	57–27
Bradford	46–38	54–30		49–35	25–59	34–50	48–35	35–49	41–43	45–38
Bristol	33–51	41–42	51–33		47–37	47–37	64–20	37–47	43–41	36–48
Harringay	51–33	48–36	47–37	41–42		52–32	54–30	36–48	55–28	42–42
New Cross	45–39	30–53	44–40	47–37	31–53		35–48	41–43	49–35	41–42
Norwich	36–48	35–49	52–32	48–36	50–34	42–42		48–35	41–43	38–46
Wembley	50–34	53–29	62–22	56–28	40–44	45–39	63–21		58–25	52–32
West Ham	56–28	45–39	54–30	58–26	42–42	39–45	54–30	21–63		42–41
Wimbledon	38–46	52–32	48–36	45–38	51–33	50–34	59–25	35–49	42–42	

Legend: Blue = home team win; Yellow = draw; Red = away team win.

== Top Ten Riders (League only) ==
	Rider	Nat	Team	C.M.A.
1	Ronnie Moore	(New Zealand)	Wimbledon	11.27
2	Jack Young	(Australia)	West Ham	10.88
3	Bob Leverenz	(Australia)	Norwich	10.29
4	Alan Hunt	(England)	Birmingham	10.00
5	Split Waterman	(England)	Harringay	9.96
6	Freddie Williams	(Wales)	Wembley	9.76
7	Tommy Price	(England)	Wembley	9.31
8	Cyril Brine	(England)	Wimbledon	9.00
9	Eddie Rigg	(England)	Bradford	8.82
10	Bert Roger	(England)	New Cross	8.79

== National Trophy Stage Three ==
The 1952 National Trophy was the 15th edition of the Knockout Cup. The Trophy consisted of three stages; stage one was for the third-tier clubs, stage two was for the second-tier clubs and stage three was for the top-tier clubs. The winner of stage one would qualify for stage two and the winner of stage two would qualify for the third and final stage. Harringay won the third and final stage and were therefore declared the 1952 National Trophy champions.

- For Stage One - see Stage One
- For Stage Two - see Stage Two

First round

Date	Team one	Score	Team two
19/07	Norwich	74-34	Poole
12/07	Birmingham	79-29	Bristol
04/07	Bristol	46-62	Birmingham
05/07	Bradford Odsal	67-40	West Ham
01/07	West Ham	66-42	Bradford Odsal

Second round

Date	Team one	Score	Team two
11/08	Birmingham	69-39	Belle Vue
26/07	Belle Vue	59-49	Birmingham
26/07	Bradford Odsal	58-50	Wembley
26/07	Poole	72-36	New Cross
23/07	New Cross	75-33	Poole
21/07	Wimbledon	57-51	Harringay
18/07	Harringay	57-50	Wimbledon
17/07	Wembley	66-41	Bradford Odsal

Semifinals

Date	Team one	Score	Team two
21/08	Wembley	59-49	Birmingham
16/08	Birmingham	69-39	Wembley
15/08	Harringay	57-51	New Cross
13/08	New Cross	43-64	Harringay

=== Final ===
First leg

20 September 1952

Birmingham Brummies Arthur Payne 17 Graham Warren 11 Eric Boothroyd 9 Ron Mountford 7 Ivor Davies 7 Cyril Page 5 Ron Mason 1 Cecil Hookham 0	57 – 51	Harringay Racers Ken Walsh 11 Jack Biggs 10 Ron How 8 Arthur Atkinson 7 Maury Dunn 5 Danny Dunton 4 Split Waterman 3 Jeff Lloyd 3

Perry Barr Stadium

Second leg

26 September 1952

Harringay Racers Jack Biggs 17 Ron How 12 Jeff Lloyd 11 Maury Dunn 10 Arthur Atkinson 10 Ken Walsh 6 Danny Dunton 5 Split Waterman 3	72 – 35	Birmingham Brummies Arthur Payne 15 Eric Boothroyd 6 Nobby Stock 6 Ivor Davies 2 Howdy Byford 2 Cyril Page 1 Ron Mason 1 Cecil Hookham 0

Harringay Stadium

Harringay were National Trophy Champions, winning on aggregate 123–92.

== London Cup ==
First round

Team one	Score	Team two
West Ham	63–45, 49–58	New Cross

Semi final round

Team one	Score	Team two
Wembley	49–59, 53–55	Wimbledon
Harringay	56–51, 54–53	West Ham

=== Final ===
First leg

4 August 1952

Wimbledon Ronnie Moore 12 Geoff Mardon 12 Cyril Brine 8 Reg Trott 6 Dennis Gray 6 Cyril Maidment 2 Barry Briggs 2 Mike Beddoe 0	48–57	Harringay Jack Biggs 11 Split Waterman 11 Maury Dunn 8 Jeff Lloyd 8 Ron How 7 Danny Dunton 6 Nobby Stock 4 Arthur Atkinson 2

Plough Lane

Second leg

8 August 1952

Harringay Split Waterman 13 Jeff Lloyd 11 Maury Dunn 8 Ron How 8 Jack Biggs 7 Danny Dunton 4 Arthur Atkinson 3 Nobby Stock 2	56–52	Wimbledon Ronnie Moore 16 Cyril Brine 13 Geoff Mardon 12 Reg Trott 4 Barry Briggs 3 Dennis Gray 2 Cyril Maidment 2 Don Perry 1

Harringay Stadium

Harringay won on aggregate 113–100

== Riders & final averages ==
Belle Vue

- (South Africa) Henry Long 8.63
- (England) Ken Sharples 8.37
- (New Zealand) Ron Johnston 7.40
- (England) Jack Parker 6.89
- (England) Dent Oliver 7.16
- (England) George Smith 6.63
- (England) Harry Edwards 6.15
- (England) Louis Lawson 6.69
- (England) Dennis Parker 5.28
- (England) Bob Fletcher 5.25
- (England) Norman Hargreaves 2.60
- (England) Peter Craven 2.00

Birmingham

- (England) Alan Hunt 10.00
- (England) Howdy Byford 8.00
- (Australia) Arthur Payne 7.78
- (Sweden) Dan Forsberg 7.77
- (Australia) Graham Warren 7.33
- (England) Ron Mason 7.28
- (England) Ivor Davies 6.08
- (England) Eric Boothroyd 5.93
- (England) Lionel Watling (James Goldingay) 4.86
- (Australia) Bill Jemison 4.00
- (England) Cyril Page 3.50

Bradford

- (England) Eddie Rigg 8.82
- (England) Arthur Forrest 8.36
- (England) Dent Oliver 7.75
- (England) Jack Hughes 6.29
- (England) Oliver Hart 6.27
- (England) Arthur Wright 5.50
- (England) Bill Crosland 4.65
- (England) Ron Clarke 4.27
- (England) Al Allison 3.84
- (England) Arthur Bush 3.50
- (England) Lloyd Goffe 2.82
- (England) Keith Milner 2.53

Bristol

- (England) Dick Bradley 8.29
- (Wales) Chris Boss 6.85
- (England) Geoff Pymar 6.36
- (England) Billy Hole 6.11
- (England) Jack Mountford 5.87
- (Wales) Tom Oakley 5.50
- (England) Johnny Hole 5.23
- (England) Eric Salmon 5.00
- (Australia) Jack Summers 5.04
- (England) Roger Wise 4.55

Harringay

- (England) Split Waterman 9.96
- (England) Jeff Lloyd 8.47
- (Australia) Jack Biggs 8.37
- (England) Ron How 7.25
- (New Zealand) Maurice Dunn 6.78
- (England) Arthur Atkinson 6.28
- (England) Danny Dunton 5.85
- (England) Nobby Stock 5.66
- (Australia) Ken Walsh 5.52
- (England) Stan Clark 2.80

New Cross

- (England) Bert Roger 8.79
- (Republic of Ireland) Eric French 8.60
- (England) Cyril Roger 7.66
- (Sweden) Sune Karlsson 7.61
- (Australia) Merv Harding 7.26
- (England) Frank Lawrence 5.66
- (Australia) Bill Longley 5.18
- (England) Bob Roger 4.53
- (Wales) Tom Oakley 4.49
- (England) Ronnie Genz 4.15

Norwich

- (Australia) Bob Leverenz 10.29
- (England) Billy Bales 8.20
- (England) Bill Gilbert 7.41
- (England) Fred Rogers 7.05
- (England) Phil Clarke 4.70
- (England) Fred Pawson 5.09
- (England) Lionel Watling (James Goldingay) 4.82
- (England) Jack Freeman 4.24
- (England) Paddy Mills 4.00
- (England) Bill Codling 3.22
- (Denmark) Kiehn Berthelsen 3.11
- (England) Ray Moore 2.71

Wembley

- (Wales) Freddie Williams 9.76
- (England) Tommy Price 9.31
- (Wales) Eric Williams 8.23
- (New Zealand) Trevor Redmond 7.74
- (England) George Wilks 7.41
- (England) Bob Oakley 7.32
- (England) Bill Kitchen 6.79
- (England) Jimmy Gooch 4.92
- (England) Den Cosby 1.60

West Ham

- (Australia) Jack Young 10.88
- (England) Wally Green 8.56
- (England) Malcolm Craven 7.75
- (England) Pat Clark 6.37
- (Australia) Cliff Watson 5.49
- (England) Howdy Byford 5.00
- (England) Kid Curtis 4.26
- (England) Wal Morton 2.86
- (England) Reg Reeves 2.46
- (England) Colin Clark 1.40

Wimbledon

- (New Zealand) Ronnie Moore 11.27
- (England) Norman Parker 9.60
- (England) Cyril Brine 9.00
- (New Zealand) Geoff Mardon 8.68
- (England) Dennis Gray 6.84
- (Australia) Peter Moore 5.74
- (United States) Ernie Roccio 5.66
- (England) Reg Trott 5.25
- (New Zealand) Barry Briggs 4.20
- (England) Mike Beddoe 3.58
- (England) Cyril Maidment 3.12
- (England) Wilf Jay 1.71
- (Republic of Ireland) Dom Perry 1.23
- (England) Ken Holmes 0.83

== See also ==
- List of United Kingdom Speedway League Champions
- Knockout Cup (speedway)
