= 1948 Speedway National League =

British speedway season

- League: National League Division One
- No. of competitors: 7
- Champions: New Cross Rangers
- National Trophy: Wembley Lions
- Anniversary Cup: Harringay Racers
- Riders' champion: Vic Duggan
- London Cup: Wembley Lions
- Highest average: Vic Duggan
- Division/s below: National League (Div 2); National League (Div 3)

The 1948 National League Division One was the 14th season of speedway in the United Kingdom and the third post-war season of the highest tier of motorcycle speedway in Great Britain.

== Summary ==
The entrant list was the same as the previous season. New Cross Rangers won the National League for the second time.

== Fatalities ==
1948 proved to be the worst season so far in regard to fatalities. During the 1947 season two riders had died on the same day but 1948 saw three riders killed during the season. It started with 37-year-old Reg Craven, on his debut for Yarmouth Bloaters. Craven crashed with two Poole Pirates riders at Poole (on 26 April) during a National Trophy match and died eight days later (4 May) from a fractured skull in hospital. Billy Wilson of Norwich Stars and Eric Dunn of Hastings Saxons from the lower divisions were also killed.

== Final League table ==
Pos	Team	PL	W	D	L	Pts
1	New Cross Rangers	24	17	0	7	34
2	Harringay Racers	24	16	0	8	32
3	West Ham Hammers	24	14	1	9	29
4	Wembley Lions	24	12	1	11	25
5	Belle Vue Aces	24	12	1	11	25
6	Wimbledon Dons	24	5	2	17	12
7	Odsal Boomerangs	24	5	1	18	11

== National League results ==
Matches 1–12

Teams play each other twice, once at home and once away.

Home \ Away	BEL	HAR	NEW	ODS	WEM	WES	WIM
Belle Vue Aces	—	48–36	53–31	43–41	42–42	43–41	59–25
Harringay Racers	47–37	—	37–47	54–29	39–45	44–40	49–35
New Cross Rangers	61–23	41–43	—	55–28	56–27	58–26	49–35
Odsal Boomerangs	46–35	41–43	40–42	—	38–46	43–40	41–41
Wembley Lions	52–31	31–50	40.5–43.5	51–33	—	40–44	44–39
West Ham Hammers	61–23	58–26	49–35	60–22	54–30	—	47–37
Wimbledon Dons	50–33	45–38	40–44	56–27	27–57	40–43	—

Updated to match(es) played on unknown. Source:
Legend: Blue = home team win; Yellow = draw; Red = away team win.

Matches 13–24

Teams play each other twice, once at home and once away.

Home \ Away	BEL	HAR	NEW	ODS	WEM	WES	WIM
Belle Vue Aces	—	50–34	33–51	47–37	48–36	52–31	52–32
Harringay Racers	45–37	—	44–40	58–26	53–28	59–24	54–30
New Cross Rangers	38–45	40–44	—	53–29	37–47	51–32	54–30
Odsal Boomerangs	38–45	40–44	53–29	—	37–47	51–32	54–30
Wembley Lions	59–25	35–49	41–43	57–27	—	39–45	60–24
West Ham Hammers	49–35	48–36	49–35	48–36	38–46	—	64–20
Wimbledon Dons	35–47	35–49	46–38	58–26	35–49	41–41	—

Updated to match(es) played on unknown. Source:
Legend: Blue = home team win; Yellow = draw; Red = away team win.

== Anniversary Cup ==
On account of the small number of teams in the league the Anniversary Cup was run in a league format. Harringay Racers finished on top.

Pos	Team	PL	W	D	L	Pts
1	Harringay Racers	12	9	0	3	18
2	Belle Vue Aces	12	7	0	5	14
3	Odsal Boomerangs	12	7	0	5	14
4	New Cross Rangers	12	6	0	6	12
5	West Ham Hammers	12	6	0	6	12
6	Wembley Lions	12	5	0	7	10
7	Wimbledon Dons	12	2	0	10	4

Teams play each other twice, once at home and once away.

Home \ Away	BEL	HAR	NEW	ODS	WEM	WES	WIM
Belle Vue Aces	—	46.5–49.5	50–42	65–29	53–43	54–42	65–30
Harringay Racers	52–43	—	49–47	59–37	59–36	59–37	59–37
New Cross Rangers	57–39	49–47	—	51–44	49–46	58–38	42–54
Odsal Boomerangs	53–43	52–44	48–47	—	66–30	51–45	61–35
Wembley Lions	45–51	47–49	49–47	61–35	—	60–36	60–35
West Ham Hammers	58–38	50–45	62–34	48–47	49–47	—	60–34
Wimbledon Dons	47–48	46–50	42–53	46–49	40–56	53–42	—

Updated to match(es) played on unknown. Source:
Legend: Blue = home team win; Yellow = draw; Red = away team win.

== Top Ten Riders (League only) ==
	Rider	Nat	Team	C.M.A.
1	Vic Duggan	(Australia)	Harringay Racers	11.42
2	Ron Johnson	(Australia)	New Cross	10.33
3	Wilbur Lamoreaux	(United States)	Wembley Lions	9.71
4	George Wilks	(England)	Wembley Lions	9.65
5	Max Grosskreutz	(Australia)	Odsal	9.63
6	Aub Lawson	(Australia)	West Ham	9.59
7	Alec Statham	(England)	Wimbledon	9.48
8	Jack Parker	(England)	Belle Vue	9.35
9	Eric Chitty	(Canada)	West Ham	9.21
10	Norman Parker	(England)	Wimbledon	9.09

== National Trophy ==
The 1948 Trophy was the 11th edition of the Knockout Cup.

Qualifying Competition Round 1

Date	Team one	Score	Team two
23/04	Wombwell	31 77	Southampton
17/04	Cradley Heath	66 42	Plymouth
13/04	Southampton	89 19	Wombwell
12/04	Exeter	81 27	Tamworth
08/04	Plymouth	56 50	Cradley Heath
07/04	Tamworth	82 26	Exeter

Qualifying Competition Round 2

Date	Team one	Score	Team two
29/04	Stoke Hanley	64 43	Coventry
27/04	Yarmouth	47 67	Poole
26/04	Poole	74 32	Yarmouth
07/05	Cradley Heath	78 29	Hull
05/05	Tamworth	46 62	Southampton
04/05	Southampton	77 31	Tamworth
01/05	Coventry	48 59	Stoke Hanley
01/05	Hull	42 66	Cradley Heath

Qualifying Competition semifinal

Date	Team one	Score	Team two
21/05	Cradley Heath	54 50	Southampton
13/05	Stoke Hanley	64 44	Poole
11/05	Southampton	85 23	Cradley Heath
10/05	Poole	49 57	Stoke Hanley

Qualifying Competition final

Date	Team one	Score	Team two
27/05	Stoke Hanley	43 64	Southampton
25/05	Southampton	74½ 33½	Stoke Hanley

Eliminating Competition First round

Date	Team one	Score	Team two
19/06	Birmingham	79 29	Southampton
19/06	Edinburgh	62 46	Glasgow White City
16/06	Glasgow White City	70 38	Edinburgh
15/06	Southampton	41 66	Birmingham

Eliminating Competition Second round

Date	Team one	Score	Team two
23/06	Glasgow White City	45½ 61½	Birmingham
22/06	Fleetwood	69 39	Bristol
19/06	Norwich	76 32	Sheffield
18/06	Bristol	65 43	Fleetwood
17/06	Middlesbrough	67 40	Newcastle
17/06	Sheffield	55 53	Norwich
14/06	Newcastle	41 65	Middlesbrough
03/07	Birmingham	80 28	Glasgow White City

Eliminating Competition semifinal

Date	Team one	Score	Team two
26/07	Birmingham	75 33	Fleetwood
13/07	Fleetwood	49 59	Birmingham
03/07	Norwich	66 41	Middlesbrough
01/07	Middlesbrough	53 54	Norwich

Eliminating Competition final

Date	Team one	Score	Team two
02/08	Birmingham	79 28	Norwich
31/07	Norwich	64 43	Birmingham

First round

Date	Team one	Score	Team two
04/09	Belle Vue	64 44	Wembley
27/08	Harringay	67 40	Wimbledon
26/08	Wembley	64 42	Belle Vue
21/08	Birmingham	85 23	West Ham
21/08	Bradford	62 46	New Cross
19/08	New Cross	77 30	Bradford
17/08	West Ham	67 41	Birmingham
16/08	Wimbledon	53 55	Harringay
04/09	Belle Vue	64 44	Wembley

Quarterfinals

Date	Team one	Score	Team two
27/08	Harringay	67-40	Wimbledon
26/08	Wembley	64-42	Belle Vue
21/08	Birmingham	85-23	West Ham
21/08	Bradford	62-46	New Cross
19/08	New Cross	77-30	Bradford
17/08	West Ham	67-41	Birmingham
16/08	Wimbledon	53-55	Harringay
04/09	Belle Vue	64-44	Wembley

Semifinals

Date	Team one	Score	Team two
18/09	Birmingham	69-39	New Cross
10/09	Harringay	52-56	Wembley
09/09	Wembley	73-35	Harringay
09/09	New Cross	83-25	Birmingham

=== Final ===
First leg

7 October 1948

Wembley Lions Tommy Price 13 Bill Gilbert 13 Bill Kitchen 11 Wilbur Lamoreaux 7 Split Waterman 7 Bob Wells 6 Freddie Williams 5 Roy Craighead 2	64 – 44	New Cross Rangers Ron Johnson 12 Jeff Lloyd 11 Eric French 6 Geoff Pymar 5 Ray Moore 4 Bill Longley 3 Frank Lawrence 3 Lindsay Mitchell 0

Wembley Stadium

Second leg

8 October 1948

New Cross Rangers Ron Johnson 18 Jeff Lloyd 10 Frank Lawrence 7 Eric French 5 Ray Moore 5 Geoff Pymar 4 Bill Longley 2 Lindsay Mitchell 1	52 – 56	Wembley Lions Bill Gilbert 15 Wilbur Lamoreaux 9 Bill Kitchen 7 Split Waterman 7 Bob Wells 6 Tommy Price 5 Freddie Williams 4 Roy Craighead 3

New Cross Stadium

Wembley were National Trophy Champions, winning on aggregate 120–96.

== Riders' Championship ==
Vic Duggan won the British Riders' Championship final held at Empire Stadium on 16 September, in front of nearly 90,000 spectators.

Pos.	Rider	Heat Scores	Total
1	(Australia) Vic Duggan	2 3 3 3 3	14
2	(Australia) Ron Johnson	3 2 3 2 3	13
3	(England) Alec Statham	3 3 3 3 1	13
4	(England) Split Waterman	3 2 2 1 2	10
5	(England) Bill Gilbert	2 1 3 3 1	10
6	(England) Jack Parker	2 E 3 1 3	9
7	(England) Oliver Hart	3 2 2 2	9
8	(Australia) Bill Longley	0 1 2 2 3	8
9	(United States) Wilbur Lamoreaux	2 2 0 0 2	6
10	(England) Malcolm Craven	f 3 2 1 0	6
11	(England) Jeff Lloyd	1 3 0 0 1	5
12	(Canada) Eric Chitty	1 0 1 2 1	5
13	(England) Lloyd Goffe	0 1 1 1 2	5
14	(England) Tommy Price	1 2 0 1 F	4
15	(England) Norman Parker	0 1 0 1 0	2
16	(England) Dent Oliver	1 0 0 0 0	1
16	(England) Jack Hodgson (res)	0 - - - -	0

- f=fell

== London Cup ==
First round

Team one	Score	Team two
New Cross	65–43, 43–64	Harringay

Semi final round

Team one	Score	Team two
Wimbledon	57–51, 27–80	New Cross
West Ham	61–46, 40–67	Wembley

=== Final ===
First leg

23 September 1948

Wembley Wilbur Lamoreaux 15 Bill Gilbert 14 Bill Kitchen 10 Tommy Price 10 Split Waterman 7 Freddie Williams 4 George Saunders 3 Bob Wells 2	65–40	New Cross Ron Johnson 16 Frank Lawrence 5 Ray Moore 4 Bill Longley 4 Cyril Roger 3 Eric French 3 Jeff Lloyd 3 Geoff Pymar 2

Wembley Stadium

Second leg

24 September 1948

New Cross Cyril Roger 15 Ron Johnson 14, Geoff Pymar 10 Jeff Lloyd 5 Ray Moore 5 Eric French 4 Frank Lawrence 4 Bill Longley 1	58–50	Wembley Bill Gilbert 14 Bill Kitchen 13 Freddie Williams 8 Tommy Price 5 Split Waterman 5 Wilbur Lamoreaux 3 Bob Wells 1 George Saunders 1

New Cross Stadium

Wembley won on aggregate 115–98

== Riders & final averages ==
Belle Vue

- (England) Jack Parker 9.35
- (England) Louis Lawson 7.46
- (England) Dent Oliver 6.92
- (England) Wally Hull 6.00
- (England) Bill Pitcher 5.76
- (England) Wally Lloyd 5.60
- (England) Jim Boyd 4.96
- (Australia) Jack Chignell 4.27
- (Australia) Bill Rogers 3.75
- (England) Brian Wilson 2.00

Harringay

- (Australia) Vic Duggan 11.42
- (Australia) Frank Dolan 8.53
- (England) Lloyd Goffe 7.23
- (Australia) Ray Duggan 7.23
- (England) Wal Morton 6.67
- (Australia) Jack Biggs 6.56
- (England) Steve Ison 5.37
- (Australia) Jack Arnfield 4.96
- (England) Jimmy Grant 4.68
- (England) Nobby Stock 3.84

New Cross

- (England) Ron Johnson 10.33
- (England) Jeff Lloyd 8.17
- (Australia) Bill Longley 7.96
- (England) Geoff Pymar 7.39
- (England) Cyril Roger 7.27
- (England) Ray Moore 7.15
- (Republic of Ireland) Eric French 7.12
- (England) George Newton 5.48
- (England) Frank Lawrence 5.79
- (England) Mick Mitchell 2.00
- (Australia) Lindsay Mitchell 0.67

Odsal

- (Australia) Max Grosskreutz 9.63
- (England) Oliver Hart 8.57
- (England) Ernie Price 7.72
- (England) Ron Clarke 7.34
- (England) Eddie Rigg 6.15
- (England) Joe Abbott 5.60
- (England) Eric Mason 4.00
- (England) Bob Lovell 3.33
- (Australia) Andy Menzies 3.71
- (England) Bill Osborne 3.20
- (England) Jock Shead 2.78
- (England) Norman Price 2.40
- (England) Vic Emms 1.50

Wembley

- (United States) Wilbur Lamoreaux 9.71
- (England) George Wilks 9.65
- (England) Tommy Price 8.81
- (England) Split Waterman 8.27
- (England) Bill Gilbert 7.63
- (England) Bill Kitchen 7.17
- (Wales) Freddie Williams 6.43
- (England) Bob Wells 5.40
- (England) George Saunders 4.26
- (England) Roy Craighead 3.37
- (England) Bill Kemp 2.50

West Ham

- (Australia) Aub Lawson 9.59
- (Canada) Eric Chitty 9.21
- (England) Malcolm Craven 8.13
- (Australia) Cliff Watson 7.01
- (England) Kid Curtis 5.89
- (England) Tommy Croombs 5.64
- (England) Howdy Byford 5.30
- (England) Bob Harrison 3.58
- (England) Frank Bettis 0.67

Wimbledon

- (England) Norman Parker 9.09
- (England) Alec Statham 9.48
- (England) Cyril Brine 7.19
- (England) Les Wotton 5.37
- (England) Mike Erskine 4.87
- (England) Arch Windmill 3.80
- (England) Ron Mason 3.59
- (England) Dick Harris 3.43
- (England) Jimmy Coy 2.35
- (Australia) Lionel Levy 2.29

== See also ==
- List of United Kingdom Speedway League Champions
- Knockout Cup (speedway)
