= 1950 Speedway National League =

British speedway season

- League: National League Division One
- No. of competitors: 9
- Champions: Wembley Lions
- National Trophy: Wimbledon Dons
- Spring Cup: New Cross Rangers
- London Cup: Wembley Lions
- Highest average: Graham Warren
- Division/s below: National League (Div 2); National League (Div 3)

The 1950 National League Division One was the 16th season of speedway in the United Kingdom and the fifth post-war season of the highest tier of motorcycle speedway in Great Britain.

== Summary ==
Bristol Bulldogs joined the league. Wembley Lions won the National League for the fifth time.

The Odsal Boomerangs became the Odsal Tudors during the season, the name change came at the end of July, possibly as a consequence of the events of 1 July. On 1 July 1950, 47-year-old Joe Abbott was killed instantly following a crash at Odsal Stadium in a league match against West Ham Hammers. After falling and hitting the safety fence he was hit by a rider behind. Jock Shead, a second rider was killed on the same night in a division 2 fixture.

== Final table ==
Pos	Team	P	W	D	L	Pts
1	Wembley Lions	32	24	0	8	48
2	Belle Vue Aces	32	19	0	13	38
3	Wimbledon Dons	32	17	1	14	35
4	New Cross Rangers	32	16	1	15	33
5	West Ham Hammers	32	16	0	16	32
6	Bradford Tudors	32	16	0	16	32
7	Bristol Bulldogs	32	15	0	17	30
8	Birmingham Brummies	32	12	0	20	24
9	Harringay Racers	32	8	0	24	16

== Fixtures and results ==
=== A fixtures ===
Home \ Away	BV	BIR	BRA	BRI	HAR	NC	WEM	WH	WIM
Belle Vue		49–35	46–38	63–21	61–23	40–44	45–39	60–24	62–21
Birmingham	37–47		44–40	47–37	52–32	43–41	39–45	50–33	49–35
Bradford	47–37	48–36		61–23	54–30	51–33	41–42	48–35	43–41
Bristol	49–35	55–29	49–35		42–41	41–43	43–40	44–40	38–46
Harringay	37–47	51–31	39.5–42.5	56–28		37–47	31–52	40–44	44–39
New Cross	59–25	60–24	53–31	64–20	51–33		36–48	54–29	55–29
Wembley	48–36	60–24	59–25	58–26	51–33	43–41		60–24	46–38
West Ham	46–38	44–40	59–25	51–33	36–48	45–39	33–51		46–38
Wimbledon	41–43	53–31	52–32	50–32	55–29	42–42	34–50	35–49	

Legend: Blue = home team win; Yellow = draw; Red = away team win.

=== B fixtures ===
Home \ Away	BV	BIR	BRA	BRI	HAR	NC	WEM	WH	WIM
Belle Vue		43–40	40–44	59–25	54–30	61–23	40–44	47–37	39–45
Birmingham	41–43		48–36	64–20	56–28	49–34	47–37	53–31	30–54
Bradford	47–37	53–31		62–21	44–40	57–27	52–32	48–36	41–43
Bristol	47–37	48–36	44.5–39.5		50.5–33.5	48–36	48–35	45–38	50–33
Harringay	37–46	61–23	52–32	37–47		49–35	36–48	37–43	26–58
New Cross	54–30	47–37	59–25	62–22	47–35		39–45	50–34	38–46
Wembley	39–45	59–25	52–32	54–29	54–30	45–36		59–25	33–48
West Ham	51–33	59–25	54–29	54–30	52–31	55–29	51–32		35–49
Wimbledon	41–43	49–35	60–24	64–20	39–45	61–23	41–43	44–40	

Legend: Blue = home team win; Yellow = draw; Red = away team win.

== Top ten riders (league only) ==
	Rider	Nat	Team	C.M.A.
1	Graham Warren	(Australia)	Birmingham	10.55
2	Norman Parker	(England)	Wimbledon	10.17
3	Tommy Price	(England)	Wembley	9.79
4	Jack Parker	(England)	Belle Vue	9.42
5	Vic Duggan	(Australia)	Harringay	9.30
6	Alec Statham	(England)	Wimbledon	9.21
7	Cyril Roger	(England)	New Cross	9.21
8	Louis Lawson	(England)	Belle Vue	9.19
9	Bert Roger	(England)	New Cross	9.04
10	Eric French	(England)	New Cross	8.81

== National Trophy Stage Three ==
The 1950 National Trophy was the 13th edition of the Knockout Cup. The Trophy consisted of three stages; stage one was for the third division clubs, stage two was for the second division clubs and stage three was for the top-tier clubs. The winner of stage one would qualify for stage two and the winner of stage two would qualify for the third and final stage. Wimbledon Dons won the third and final stage and were therefore declared the 1950 National Trophy champions.

- For Stage One - see Stage One
- For Stage Two - see Stage Two

First round

Date	Team one	Score	Team two
29/07	Belle Vue	80-28	New Cross
26/07	New Cross	48-60	Belle Vue
01/08	Halifax	50-58	Harringay
28/07	Harringay	68-39	Halifax

Second round

Date	Team one	Score	Team two
12/08	Belle Vue	55-52	Wimbledon
14/08	Wimbledon	67-41	Belle Vue
10/08	Wembley	53-51	Birmingham
05/08	Birmingham	79-29	Wembley
12/08	Bradford	80-28	Bristol
11/08	Bristol	66-42	Bradford
11/08	Harringay	62-46	West Ham
08/08	West Ham	62-46	Harringay
01/09 replay	Harringay	49-59	West Ham
29/08 replay	West Ham	59-49	Harringay

Semifinals

Date	Team one	Score	Team two
12/09	West Ham	56-51	Bradford
09/09	Bradford	70-38	West Ham
28/08	Wimbledon	61-47	Birmingham
26/08	Birmingham	42-66	Wimbledon

=== Final ===
First leg

23 September 1950

Bradford Tudors Ron Clarke 16 Jack Biggs 14 Oliver Hart 10 Dick Seers 8 Ronnie Peace 6 Ernie Price 6 Norman Price 1	61 – 47	Wimbledon Dons Dennis Gray 9 Ronnie Moore 9 Cyril Brine 7 Mike Erskine 6 Ernie Roccio 6 Norman Parker4 Jim Gregory 4 Alec Statham 2

Odsal Stadium

Second leg

25 September 1950

Wimbledon Dons Dennis Gray 15 Cyril Brine 13 Norman Parker 11 Reg Trott 9 Ernie Roccio 8 Alec Statham 7 Ronnie Moore 7 Mike Erskine 2	72 – 36	Bradford Tudors Ron Clarke 12 Jack Biggs 8 Dick Seers 4 Ernie Price 4 Norman Price 3 Ken Brown 3 Oliver Hart 2 Ron Peace 1

Wimbledon Stadium

Wimbledon were National Trophy Champions, winning on aggregate 119–97, the trophy was presented by Vera Lynn.

== Spring Cup ==
Group A

Team	PL	W	D	L	Pts
New Cross	6	6	0	0	12
Belle Vue	6	4	0	2	8
Wimbledon	6	1	0	5	2
Bristol	6	1	0	5	2

Group B

Team	PL	W	D	L	Pts
West Ham	6	4	0	2	8
Bradford	6	4	0	2	8
Harringay	6	3	0	3	6
Birmingham	6	1	0	5	2

Group A

Home \ Away	BV	BRI	NC	WIM
Belle Vue		88–32	58–61	70–50
Bristol	56–64		59–61	74–46
New Cross	65–50	72–47		65–55
Wimbledon	50–67	78–42	42–78	

Legend: Blue = home team win; Yellow = draw; Red = away team win.

Group B

Home \ Away	BIR	BRA	HAR	WH
Birmingham		51–69	65–55	47–72
Bradford	81–38		71–48	55–65
Harringay	75–45	81–38		67–53
West Ham	83–37	59–61	68–51	

Legend: Blue = home team win; Yellow = draw; Red = away team win.

Final

Team one	Team two	Scores
West Ham	New Cross	45–73, 50–70

== London Cup ==
First round

Team one	Score	Team two
New Cross	45–62, 33–74	Wimbledon
West Ham	66–42, 46–62	Walthamstow

Semi final round

Team one	Score	Team two
Wembley	58–50, 51–56	Harringay
Wimbledon	56–50, 54–54	West Ham

=== Final ===
First leg

7 September 1950

Wembley Tommy Price 13 Freddie Williams 12 George Wilks 8 Bob Oakley 7 Bill Gilbert 7 Eric Williams 6 Bruce Abernethy 2 Bill Kitchen 1	56–51	Wimbledon Ronnie Moore 13 Ernie Roccio 11 Norman Parker 9 Cyril Brine 6 Mike Erskine 5 Alec Statham 3 Dennis Gray 2 Jim Gregory 2

Wembley Stadium

Second leg

11 September 1950

Wimbledon Cyril Brine 13 Ernie Roccio 10 Norman Parker 10 Mike Erskine 9 Ronnie Moore 6 Dennis Gray 3 Reg Trott 3 Alec Statham 2	56–52	Wembley Bob Oakley 14 Tommy Price 10 Freddie Williams 9 Bruce Abernethy 7 Bill Gilbert 6 George Wilks 4 Bill Kitchen 2 Eric Williams 0

Plough Lane

Wembley won on aggregate 108–107

== Riders & final averages ==
Belle Vue

- (England) Jack Parker 9.42
- (England) Louis Lawson 9.19
- (England) Dent Oliver 8.42
- (New Zealand) Ron Johnston 8.00
- (United States) Charles Cullum 7.02
- (England) Ken Sharples 6.58
- (South Africa) Henry Long 5.88
- (England) George Smith 5.44
- (England) Ron Mason 5.34
- (England) Dennis Parker 4.90
- (South Africa) Gerry Hickson 1.33

Birmingham

- (Australia) Graham Warren 10.55
- (England) Geoff Bennett 8.19
- (Australia) Arthur Payne 7.07
- (Australia) Doug McLachlan 6.46
- (England) Fred Perkins 4.73
- (England) Jim Tolley 4.44
- (England) Ron Mountford 3.92
- (England) Dennis Hitchings 3.61
- (England) Bob Wells 3.33
- (England) Wilf Willstead 2.61

Bradford

- (Australia) Jack Biggs 8.78
- (England) Ron Clarke 8.35
- (England) Eddie Rigg 7.89
- (England) Joe Abbott 5.95
- (Australia) Dick Seers 5.53
- (England) Oliver Hart 7.54
- (England) Ernie Price 5.66
- (England) Norman Price 4.61
- (England) Ron Peace 4.85
- (England) Ken Brown 4.08
- (England) Eric Smith 1.67

Bristol

- (England) Billy Hole 7.15
- (England) Fred Tuck 6.78
- (England) Dick Bradley 6.36
- (England) Jack Mountford 5.94
- (England) Geoff Pymar 5.93
- (England) Eric Salmon 5.73
- (England) Roger Wise 5.51
- (England) Johnny Hole 4.91
- (England) Mike Beddoe 4.64
- (Wales) Chris Boss 4.57
- (Australia) Jack Summers 3.20

Harringay

- (Australia) Vic Duggan 9.28
- (England) Split Waterman 8.22
- (England) Danny Dunton 7.71
- (England) Jeff Lloyd 6.33
- (Australia) Cliff Watson 6.08
- (England) Joe Bowkis 5.43
- (England) Geoff Pymar 5.25
- (England) Lloyd Goffe 4.82
- (England) Alf Viccary 4.00
- (England) Nobby Stock 4.12
- (England) Fred Pawson 3.78
- (England) Jimmy Grant 3.40
- (England) Arthur Bush 3.13
- (England) Sid Clark 3.10

New Cross

- (England) Cyril Roger 9.21
- (England) Bert Roger 9.04
- (Republic of Ireland) Eric French 8.81
- (England) Jeff Lloyd 7.17
- (Australia) Bill Longley 7.00
- (England) Frank Lawrence 5.88
- (England) Ron Johnson 5.60
- (England) Ray Moore 5.13
- (England) Bob Baker 3.82
- (England) Don Gray 3.40
- (England) Ronnie Genz 0.80

Wembley

- (England) Tommy Price 9.79
- (Wales) Freddie Williams 8.75
- (England) George Wilks 8.44
- (England) Bill Kitchen 7.88
- (England) Bob Oakley 7.37
- (England) Bill Gilbert 7.33
- (Wales) Eric Williams 7.22
- (New Zealand) Bruce Abernethy 6.16
- (England) Alf Bottoms 4.17
- (England) Bob Wells 3.70
- (England) Jimmy Gooch 3.11
- (England) Den Cosby 2.67
- (Australia) Jack Gates 1.45

West Ham

- (Australia) Aub Lawson 8.79
- (England) Wally Green 8.03
- (England) Malcolm Craven 7.66
- (Canada) Eric Chitty 7.52
- (England) Reg Fearman 5.70
- (England) Lloyd Goffe 5.53
- (England) Howdy Byford 5.14
- (England) Kid Curtis 5.00
- (England) Frank Bettis 4.75
- (Australia) Cliff Watson 3.43
- (Wales) Trevor Davies 2.52

Wimbledon

- (England) Norman Parker 10.17
- (England) Alec Statham 9.21
- (England) Cyril Brine 8.66
- (New Zealand) Ronnie Moore 7.23
- (United States) Ernie Roccio 6.88
- (England) Dennis Gray 5.98
- (England) Mike Erskine 5.94
- (England) Jim Gregory 4.89
- (England) Dick Harris 4.30
- (England) Reg Trott 4.16
- (England) Bruce Semmens 3.08

== See also ==
- List of United Kingdom Speedway League Champions
- Knockout Cup (speedway)
