= 1949 Speedway National League =

British speedway season

- League: National League Division One
- No. of competitors: 8
- Champions: Wembley Lions
- National Trophy: Belle Vue Aces
- London Cup: Wembley Lions
- Highest average: Vic Duggan
- Division/s below: National League (Div 2); National League (Div 3)

The 1949 National League Division One was the 15th season of speedway in the United Kingdom and the fourth post-war season of the highest tier of motorcycle speedway in Great Britain.

== Summary ==
Birmingham Brummies joined the league and the Anniversary (League) Cup was discontinued or the teams would have met each other six times in the league. Wembley Lions won the National League for the fourth time.

== Final table ==
Pos	Team	PL	W	D	L	Pts
1	Wembley Lions	42	28	1	13	57
2	Belle Vue Aces	42	24	0	18	48
3	New Cross Rangers	42	24	0	18	48
4	West Ham Hammers	42	23	0	19	46
5	Odsal Boomerangs	42	22	1	19	45
6	Harringay Racers	42	18	0	24	36
7	Birmingham Brummies	42	16	1	25	32
8	Wimbledon Dons	42	11	1	30	23

== Fixtures & results ==
=== A fixtures ===
Home \ Away	BV	BIR	BRA	HAR	NC	WEM	WH	WIM
Belle Vue		49–35	27–57	47–37	58–23	45–39	41–43	47–37
Birmingham	41–43		48–36	36–47	46–38	54.5–29.5	62–22	46–35
Bradford Odsal	49–35	42–42		47–37	50–34	51–32	55–29	55–29
Harringay	47–37	59–25	48–36		35–48	31–53	43–41	46–38
New Cross	46–38	56–28	48–34	63–20		40–44	44–39	44–40
Wembley	47–37	62–22	54–30	40–44	53–31		58–26	49–35
West Ham	50–34	51–33	50–33	47–37	48–36	44–40		54–30
Wimbledon	44–40	52–32	31–53	46–37	34–47	42–42	46–38	

Legend: Blue = home team win; Yellow = draw; Red = away team win.

=== B fixtures ===
Home \ Away	BV	BIR	BRA	HAR	NC	WEM	WH	WIM
Belle Vue		55–29	55–28	54–30	45–39	52–32	59–25	48–35
Birmingham	39–45		37–46	39–45	50–34	34–49	53–31	49–35
Bradford Odsal	48–36	60–24		57–27	42–41	34–50	51–33	58–25
Harringay	34–50	46–38	42–41		52–31	37–47	47–37	42–41
New Cross	51–33	52–32	64–20	43–40		48–36	54–29	42–41
Wembley	48–36	49–35	45–39	65–19	53–31		37–47	58–26
West Ham	45–39	43–31	52–32	50–34	39–45	39–45		44–40
Wimbledon	55–29	41–43	50–33	50–34	34–50	39–45	38–46	

Legend: Blue = home team win; Yellow = draw; Red = away team win.

=== C fixtures ===
Home \ Away	BV	BIR	BRA	HAR	NC	WEM	WH	WIM
Belle Vue		53–31	34–50	59–25	43–40	59–25	55–29	61–23
Birmingham	38–46		48–36	48–36	49–35	50–34	34–50	54.5–29.5
Bradford Odsal	34–50	50–33		57–26	54–30	50–33	65–19	49–35
Harringay	52–32	50–34	51–33		34–49	30–53	45–39	53–31
New Cross	46–38	50–34	57–27	51–33		38–46	55–29	45–38
Wembley	45–39	41–43	43–41	54–30	52–32		47–36	47–37
West Ham	46–38	36–48	58–26	50–33	54–30	47–37		60–24
Wimbledon	35–49	51–33	42–40	58–26	48–36	40–44	39–45	

Legend: Blue = home team win; Yellow = draw; Red = away team win.

== Top Ten Riders (League only) ==
	Rider	Nat	Team	C.M.A.
1	Vic Duggan	(Australia)	Harringay	10.65
2	Graham Warren	(Australia)	Birmingham	10.21
3	Jack Parker	(England)	Belle Vue	10.12
4	Wilbur Lamoreaux	(United States)	Birmingham	9.86
5	Dent Oliver	(England)	Belle Vue	9.60
6	Aub Lawson	(Australia)	West Ham	9.57
7	Norman Parker	(England)	Wimbledon	9.35
8	Bill Gilbert	(England)	Wembley	9.24
9	Tommy Price	(England)	Wembley	9.10
10	Ron Clarke	(England)	Odsal	8.79

== National Trophy Stage Three ==
The 1949 National Trophy was the 12th edition of the Knockout Cup. The Trophy consisted of three stages; stage one was for the third division clubs, stage two was for the second division clubs and stage three was for the top-tier clubs. The winner of stage one would qualify for stage two and the winner of stage two would qualify for the third and final stage. Belle Vue Aces won the third and final stage and were therefore declared the 1949 National Trophy champions.

- For Stage One - see Stage One
- For Stage Two - see Stage Two

First round

Date	Team one	Score	Team two
29/07	Harringay	60-47	Bradford Odsal
23/07	Bradford Odsal	80-28	Harringay

Second round

Date	Team one	Score	Team two
20/08	Bradford Odsal	70-38	Birmingham
19/08	Bristol	47-60	New Cross
18/08	Wembley	56-52	West Ham
17/08	New Cross	55-53	Bristol
16/08	West Ham	64-44	Wembley
13/08	Birmingham	51-57	Bradford Odsal
15/08	Wimbledon	58-50	Belle Vue

Semifinals

Date	Team one	Score	Team two
17/09	Belle Vue	66-42	Bradford Odsal
10/09	Bradford Odsal	54-54	Belle Vue
07/09	New Cross	55-53	West Ham
06/09	West Ham	64-44	New Cross

=== Final ===
First leg

1 October 1949

Belle Vue Aces Ron Mason 17 Jack Parker 16 Bruce Semmens 11 Louis Lawson 10 Dent Oliver 7 Charles Cullum 8 Bob Harrison 5 George Smith 5	78 – 30	West Ham Hammers Aub Lawson 14 Malcolm Craven 6 Kid Curtis 3 Howdy Byford 3 Cliff Watson 2 Trevor Davies 2 Reg Fearman 0 Wally Green 0

Hyde Road Stadium

Second leg

4 October 1949

West Ham Hammers Aub Lawson 15 Malcolm Craven 9 Cliff Watson 5 Kid Curtis 4 Howdy Byford 4 Wally Green 4 Reg Fearman 4 Frank Bettis 0	46 – 62	Belle Vue Aces Louis Lawson 16 Jack Parker 15 Charles Cullum 10 Dent Oliver 6 Ron Mason 5 Bruce Semmens 5 Ken Sharples 3 Bob Harrison 2

West Ham Stadium

Belle Vue were National Trophy Champions, winning on aggregate 140–76.

== London Cup ==
First round

Team one	Score	Team two
New Cross	57–50, 56–51	Wimbledon
Walthamstow	55–52, 48–60	Harringay

Semi final round

Team one	Score	Team two
West Ham	65–43, 70–38	New Cross
Wembley	65–43, 57–51	Harringay

=== Final ===
First leg

6 October 1949

Wembley Bill Kitchen 14 Bill Gilbert 11 Tommy Price 9 Split Waterman 8 George Wilks 7	58–50	West Ham Aub Lawson 18 Cliff Watson 8 Malcolm Craven 7 Wally Green 7

Wembley Stadium

Second leg

11 October 1949

West Ham Aub Lawson 9 Howdy Byford 8 Cliff Watson 7 Kid Curtis 6 Malcolm Craven 6	42–66	Wembley Tommy Price 17 Bill Kitchen 16 George Wilks 11 Split Waterman 7 Freddie Williams 6 Bob Wells 6

West Ham Stadium

Wembley won on aggregate 124–92

== Riders & final averages ==
Belle Vue

- (England) Jack Parker 10.12
- (England) Dent Oliver 9.60
- (England) Louis Lawson 7.95
- (England) Bruce Semmens 6.17
- (England) Ken Sharples 5.96
- (England) Bob Harrison 5.75
- (United States) Charles Cullum 5.72
- (England) George Smith 5.68
- (Australia) Jack Chignell 5.41
- (England) Ron Mason 5.36
- (England) Jim Boyd 4.10
- (South Africa) Henry Long 3.43

Birmingham

- (Australia) Graham Warren 10.21
- (United States) Wilbur Lamoreaux 9.86
- (Australia) Doug McLachlan 7.02
- (England) Geoff Bennett 6.14
- (Australia) Arthur Payne 5.94
- (England) Dennis Hitchings 4.40
- (England) Stan Dell 4.18
- (Australia) Buck Whitby 3.09
- (England) Dick Tolley 3.02
- (England) Bill Humphries 2.91
- (England) Brian Wilson 2.24

Harringay

- (Australia) Vic Duggan 10.65
- (Australia) Ray Duggan 6.83
- (England) Geoff Pymar 6.63
- (England) Nobby Stock 5.77
- (England) Danny Dunton 5.03
- (England) Arthur Bush 4.97
- (England) Lloyd Goffe 4.68
- (England) Jimmy Grant 4.06
- (England) Sid Clark 3.79
- (England) Joe Bowkis 3.11

New Cross

- (England) Ron Johnson 8.60
- (Australia) Bill Longley 8.02
- (England) Cyril Roger 7.86
- (Republic of Ireland) Eric French 7.58
- (England) Jeff Lloyd 7.19
- (England) Bert Roger 6.47
- (England) Bob Baker 6.12
- (England) Ray Moore 5.77
- (England) Frank Lawrence 5.17
- (England) Don Gray 3.58

Odsal

- (England) Ron Clarke 8.79
- (Australia) Jack Biggs 8.73
- (England) Oliver Hart 8.31
- (England) Joe Abbott 7.93
- (England) Ernie Price 7.74
- (England) Eddie Rigg 6.68
- (England) Bob Lovell 3.61
- (England) Norman Price 3.58
- (England) Dyson Harper 1.16

Wembley

- (England) Bill Gilbert 9.24
- (England) Tommy Price 9.10
- (England) Split Waterman 8.20
- (Wales) Freddie Williams 7.40
- (England) George Wilks 5.80
- (England) Bill Kitchen 7.60
- (England) Bob Wells 6.59
- (New Zealand) Bruce Abernethy 5.05
- (England) Alf Bottoms 5.69
- (Australia) Jack Gates 2.82
- (England) Den Cosby 2.67
- (England) George Saunders 2.60
- (England) Buster Brown 2.57

West Ham

- (Australia) Aub Lawson 9.57
- (Australia) Cliff Watson 8.00
- (England) Malcolm Craven 7.98
- (England) George Wilks 6.71
- (Canada) Eric Chitty 6.09
- (England) Howdy Byford 5.30
- (England) Wally Green 4.53
- (England) Kid Curtis 3.84
- (England) Frank Bettis 3.93
- (England) Reg Fearman 1.71

Wimbledon

- (England) Norman Parker 9.35
- (England) Alec Statham 7.71
- (England) Mike Erskine 7.10
- (England) Cyril Brine 7.04
- (Canada) Jimmie Gibb 6.98
- (England) Dick Harris 4.00
- (England) Bill Pitcher 3.17
- (England) Reg Trott 2.87
- (England) Les Wotton 2.75
- (England) Jack Wright 2.67
- (Australia) Huck Fynn 2.18
- (England) Wal Morton 2.00

== See also ==
- List of United Kingdom Speedway League Champions
- Knockout Cup (speedway)
