= 1951 Speedway National League =

British speedway season

- League: National League Division One
- No. of competitors: 9
- Champions: Wembley Lions
- National Trophy: Wimbledon Dons
- London Cup: Wembley Lions
- Highest average: Aub Lawson
- Division/s below: National League (Div 2); National League (Div 3)

The 1951 National League Division One was the 17th season of speedway in the United Kingdom and the sixth post-war season of the highest tier of motorcycle speedway in Great Britain.

== Summary ==
The entrants were the same as the previous season as were the top three positions at the end of the season. Wembley Lions won the National League for the sixth time.

== Final table ==
Pos	Team	PL	W	D	L	Pts
1	Wembley Lions	32	25	0	7	50
2	Belle Vue Aces	32	19	1	12	39
3	Wimbledon Dons	32	17	1	14	35
4	West Ham Hammers	32	16	1	15	33
5	Birmingham Brummies	32	16	0	16	32
6	Bristol Bulldogs	32	15	1	16	31
7	Harringay Racers	32	15	1	16	31
8	New Cross Rangers	32	9	1	22	19
9	Bradford Tudors	32	9	0	23	18

== Fixtures & results ==
=== A fixtures ===
Home \ Away	BV	BIR	BRA	BRI	HAR	NC	WEM	WH	WIM
Belle Vue		44–40	57–27	50–34	55–29	52–31	43–41	51–33	47–36
Birmingham	45–39		56–28	37–46	44–39	51–33	41–43	52–31	48–36
Bradford	33–50	41–42		48–36	36–45	44–40	25–59	50–34	43–41
Bristol	54–30	54–29	65–19		46–38	38–46	48–35	49–35	40–44
Harringay	40–44	55–29	51–28	56–28		50–34	47–36	48–36	39–44
New Cross	39–45	43–41	56–28	48–34	45–39		29–53	43–41	42–42
Wembley	57–27	43–41	60–24	56–28	55–29	55–28		44–40	49–35
West Ham	51–33	54–30	48–36	53–31	50–34	48–36	37–47		59–25
Wimbledon	49–35	57–27	55–29	45–39	44–40	51–33	47–37	40–44	

Legend: Blue = home team win; Yellow = draw; Red = away team win.

=== B fixtures ===
Home \ Away	BV	BIR	BRA	BRI	HAR	NC	WEM	WH	WIM
Belle Vue		61–23	57–27	43–41	52–32	48–36	45–39	42–42	51–33
Birmingham	43–41		40–44	55–29	53–31	59–25	45–39	48–36	49–35
Bradford	45–39	37–47		37–47	34–50	45–39	40–44	53–31	54–30
Bristol	62–22	51–33	46–38		50–34	56–28	37–47	44–40	52–32
Harringay	56–28	48–36	53–31	42–42		45–38	35–49	45–39	45–39
New Cross	39–45	38–46	54–29	51–33	35–47		35–49	49–34	39–45
Wembley	61–23	55–29	50–34	53–31	43–41	57–27		38–45	49–35
West Ham	54.5–29.5	58–26	58–26	47–37	53–31	44–40	39–44		47–37
Wimbledon	49–35	51–33	63–21	60–24	50–34	49–35	36–48	46–38	

Legend: Blue = home team win; Yellow = draw; Red = away team win.

== Top Ten Riders (League only) ==
	Rider	Nat	Team	C.M.A.
1	Aub Lawson	(Australia)	West Ham	10.31
2	Ronnie Moore	(New Zealand)	Wimbledon	9.91
3	Freddie Williams	(Wales)	Wembley	9.76
4	Alan Hunt	(England)	Birmingham	9.75
5	Norman Parker	(England)	Wimbledon	9.56
6	Eddie Rigg	(England)	Bradford	9.29
7	Malcolm Craven	(England)	West Ham	9.25
8	Split Waterman	(England)	Harringay	9.07
9	Jack Parker	(England)	Belle Vue	9.03
10	Geoff Pymar	(England)	Bristol	8.95

== National Trophy Stage Three ==
The 1951 National Trophy was the 14th edition of the Knockout Cup. The Trophy consisted of three stages; stage one was for the third division clubs, stage two was for the second division clubs and stage three was for the top-tier clubs. The winner of stage one would qualify for stage two and the winner of stage two would qualify for the third and final stage. Wimbledon won the third and final stage and were therefore declared the 1951 National Trophy champions.

- For Stage One - see Stage One
- For Stage Two - see Stage Two

First round

Date	Team one	Score	Team two
10/08	Bristol	74-34	Norwich
20/08	Norwich	75-33	Bristol
07/08	West Ham	72-35	Bradford Odsal
25/08	Bradford Odsal	43-65	West Ham

Second round

Date	Team one	Score	Team two
05/09	Belle Vue	46-62	Wembley
09/08	Wembley	52-55	Belle Vue
11/08	Birmingham	55-53	Wimbledon
20/08	Wimbledon	64-44	Birmingham
25/08	Norwich	63-45	Harringay
24/08	Harringay	65-42	Norwich
04/09	West Ham	62-46	New Cross
29/08	New Cross	65-43	West Ham

Semifinals

Date	Team one	Score	Team two
04/10	Wembley	78-29	New Cross
26/09	New Cross	53-55	Wembley
03/09	Wimbledon	65-43	Harringay
07/09	Harringay	40-68	Wimbledon

=== Final ===
First leg

8 October 1951

Wimbledon Dons Ronnie Moore 15 Dennis Gray 15 Norman Parker 9 Cyril Brine 6 Ernie Roccio 3 Mike Erskine 3 Reg Trott 3 Jimmy Gibb 1	58 – 50	Wembley Lions Eric Williams 11 Tommy Price 8 Bob Oakley 7 Freddie Williams 7 Bruce Abernethy 5 George Wilks 6 Bill Kitchen 3 Jimmy Gooch 3

Wimbledon Stadium

Second leg

11 October 1951

Wembley Lions Eric Williams 8 Bill Kitchen 6 Bob Oakley 6 Freddie Williams 5 George Wilks 5 Jimmy Gooch 5 Bruce Abernethy 4 Tommy Price 2	41 – 67	Wimbledon Dons Dennis Gray 18 Ronnie Moore 14 Ernie Roccio 13 Cyril Brine 11 Norman Parker 7 Jimmy Gibb 2 Reg Trott 1 Mike Erskine 1

Wembley Stadium

Wimbledon were National Trophy Champions, winning on aggregate 125–91.

== London Cup ==
First round

Team one	Score	Team two
Wimbledon	55–51, 44–64	Wembley
Walthamstow	53–55, 29–78	West Ham

Semi final round

Team one	Score	Team two
West Ham	57–51, 42–65	Harringay
New Cross	45–63, 38–70	Wembley

=== Final ===
First leg

13 September 1951

Wembley Eric Williams 12 Bruce Abernethy 9 Tommy Price 9 Bob Oakley 8 Freddie Williams 6 George Wilks 6 Bill Kitchen 5 Jimmy Gooch 3	59–49	Harringay Olle Nygren 17 Jack Biggs 15 Jeff Lloyd 6 Ron How 4 Maurice McDermott 2 Jimmy Squibb 2 Danny Dunton 2 Nobby Stock 1

Wembley Stadium

Second leg

14 September 1951

Harringay Olle Nygren 16 Split Waterman 15 Jack Biggs 6 Ron How 4 Nobby Stock 3 Cliff Watson 3 Jeff Lloyd 2 Jimmy Squibb 0	49–59	Wembley Eric Williams 11 Bruce Abernethy 10 Freddie Williams 9 Tommy Price 8 Bob Oakley 7 Jimmy Gooch 6 George Wilks 4 Bill Kitchen 4

Harringay Stadium

Wembley won on aggregate 118–98

== Riders & final averages ==
Belle Vue

- (England) Jack Parker 9.03
- (England) Ken Sharples 7.84
- (England) Louis Lawson 7.66
- (New Zealand) Ron Johnston 7.46
- (South Africa) Henry Long 7.23
- (England) George Smith 6.03
- (England) Dennis Parker 5.61
- (England) Ron Mason 4.54
- (England) Angus McKenzie 3.48
- (England) Val Morton 2.89
- (South Africa) Bob Serrurier 1.60

Birmingham

- (England) Alan Hunt 9.75
- (England) Ron Mountford 8.17
- (Australia) Graham Warren 7.92
- (Australia) Arthur Payne 7.33
- (England) Eric Boothroyd 6.20
- (England) Cyril Page 6.00
- (England) Jim Tolley 4.95
- (England) Ivor Davies 4.52
- (England) Lionel Watling (James Goldingay) 4.04
- (England) Fred Perkins 4.50
- (Australia) Bill Jemison 2.12
- (England) Geoff Bennett inj

Bradford

- (England) Eddie Rigg 9.29
- (England) Dent Oliver 7.04
- (England) Oliver Hart 6.00
- (England) Arthur Bush 4.88
- (England) Arthur Wright 4.74
- (England) Lloyd Goffe 4.59
- (England) Ron Peace 4.15
- (England) Eric Smith 3.92
- (England) Ken Brown 3.69
- (England) Alec Burrows 3.65

Bristol

- (England) Geoff Pymar 8.94
- (England) Dick Bradley 8.80
- (England) Jack Mountford 7.05
- (England) Billy Hole 6.80
- (England) Johnny Hole 5.90
- (Wales) Chris Boss 5.28
- (England) Eric Salmon 5.51
- (England) Mike Beddoe 5.07
- (Australia) Jack Summers 2.22

Harringay

- (England) Split Waterman 9.07
- (Sweden) Olle Nygren 8.31
- (England) Jeff Lloyd 8.13
- (Australia) Jack Biggs 8.29
- (England) Nobby Stock 6.39
- (England) Danny Dunton 5.91
- (Australia) Cliff Watson 5.45
- (England) Maury McDermott 5.09
- (England) Ron How 4.75
- (England) Jimmy Squibb 4.10
- (England) Ron Barrett 4.00

New Cross

- (England) Cyril Roger 8.82
- (Republic of Ireland) Eric French 8.38
- (England) Bert Roger 8.05
- (England) Frank Lawrence 6.45
- (Wales) Tom Oakley 6.27
- (Australia) Bill Longley 4.90
- (England) Ron Johnson 3.76
- (England) Don Gray 3.73
- (England) Ray Moore 3.64
- (England) Harold McNaughton 3.62
- (England) Ronnie Genz 2.18
- (England) Dick Shepherd 1.67
- (England) Bernie Aldridge 1.50
- (England) Eric Minall 0.67

Wembley

- (Wales) Freddie Williams 9.76
- (England) Bob Oakley 8.36
- (New Zealand) Bruce Abernethy 8.27
- (England) Tommy Price 8.11
- (Wales) Eric Williams 7.62
- (England) George Wilks 7.53
- (England) Bill Kitchen 7.06
- (England) Jimmy Gooch 5.74
- (England) Bob Wells 2.94
- (England) Den Cosby 2.67

West Ham

- (Australia) Aub Lawson 10.31
- (England) Malcolm Craven 9.25
- (England) Wally Green 7.92
- (Canada) Eric Chitty 7.05
- (England) Arthur Atkinson 5.30
- (England) Howdy Byford 5.27
- (England) Kid Curtis 5.00
- (England) Reg Fearman 3.41
- (England) Lloyd Goffe 2.86
- (England) Geoff Woodger 1.43
- (England) Johnny Guilfoyle 1.40

Wimbledon

- (New Zealand) Ronnie Moore 9.95
- (England) Norman Parker 9.56
- (England) Cyril Brine 8.31
- (England) Dennis Gray 6.97
- (United States) Ernie Roccio 6.74
- (Canada) Jimmie Gibb 5.18
- (England) Jim Gregory 3.79
- (England) Reg Trott 3.65
- (England) Mike Erskine 3.00
- (New Zealand) Craig Jones 1.44

== See also ==
- List of United Kingdom Speedway League Champions
- Knockout Cup (speedway)
