= 1953 Speedway National League =

British speedway season

- League: National League
- Season: 1953
- No. of competitors: 9
- Champions: Wembley Lions
- National Trophy: Wimbledon Dons
- Coronation Cup: Harringay Racers
- London Cup: Harringay Racers
- Midland Cup: Birmingham Brummies
- Highest average: Ronnie Moore
- Division/s below: National League (Div 2); 1953 Southern League

The 1953 National League Division One was the 19th season of speedway in the United Kingdom and the eighth post-war season of the highest tier of motorcycle speedway in Great Britain.

== Summary ==
Wembley Lions won their fifth consecutive title and their eighth overall.

Wimbledon Dons won the National Trophy for the fourth time and Harringay Racers completed a cup double winning the Coronation Cup and London Cup.

New Cross Rangers folded part way through the 1953 season because MD Fred Mockford stated attendances were down to 5,000 and racing was being staged at a loss.

Novice rider Harry Eyre died in Poplar Hospital on 7 July 1953. He suffered fatal injuries earlier that evening at West Ham Stadium, in a second half novices match against Bradford.

== National League final table ==
Pos	Team	PL	W	D	L	Pts
1	Wembley Lions	16	11	1	4	23
2	Harringay Racers	16	11	0	5	22
3	Birmingham Brummies	16	9	1	6	19
4	Bradford Tudors	16	8	1	7	17
5	Wimbledon Dons	16	8	0	8	16
6	West Ham Hammers	16	7	0	9	14
7	Norwich Stars	16	6	0	10	12
8	Belle Vue Aces	16	5	1	10	11
9	Bristol Bulldogs	16	5	0	11	10

New Cross Rangers withdrew mid-season - record expunged.

== Fixtures & results ==
Home \ Away	BV	BIR	BRA	BRI	HAR	NOR	WEM	WH	WIM
Belle Vue		39–45	37–47	46–37	52–32	62–22	42–42	48–36	53–31
Birmingham	48–36		51–33	53–31	37–47	56–28	46–38	49–35	48–36
Bradford	56–28	42–42		55–29	37–47	51–33	40–43	58–26	43–41
Bristol	63–21	50–34	58–26		41–43	56–28	40–43	62–22	39–45
Harringay	47–37	53–30	51–32	51–33		56–27	33–51	60–24	49–35
Norwich	51–33	37–47	36–48	59–25	54–30		44–39	55–29	51–32
Wembley	51–33	57–27	59–25	51–33	50–34	59–25		39.5–44.5	58–26
West Ham	57–27	54–30	51–33	46–38	26–58	57–27	33–51		50–34
Wimbledon	56–28	46–36	39–45	52–32	59–25	59–25	42–41	50–34	

Legend: Blue = home team win; Yellow = draw; Red = away team win.

== Coronation Cup ==
The Coronation Cup was run in a league format. Harringay Racers came out on top.

Pos	Team	PL	W	D	L	Pts
1	Harringay Racers	16	12	0	4	24
2	Wembley Lions	16	9	0	7	18
3	Bradford Tudors	16	8	1	7	17
4	Belle Vue Aces	16	8	0	8	16
5	Norwich Stars	16	7	1	8	15
6	Wimbledon Dons	16	7	0	9	14
7	West Ham Hammers	16	7	0	9	14
8	Bristol Bulldogs	16	7	0	9	14
9	Birmingham Brummies	16	6	0	10	12

New Cross Rangers completed 14 of their 16 fixtures before withdrawing and their record was expunged.

Home \ Away	BV	BIR	BRA	BRI	HAR	NC	NOR	WEM	WH	WIM
Belle Vue		51–33	50–34	56–27	44–40	50–34	59–25	38–46	54–30	50–34
Birmingham	58–26		51–33	52–32	56–28	45–39	46–38	34–50	43–42	38–46
Bradford	47–36	43–41		55–27	46–38	41–43	42–42	55–29	44–40	49–35
Bristol	63–21	50–34	56–27		36–48	41.5–41.5	56–28	36–48	44–35	48–36
Harringay	51–33	67–17	48–36	54–30		n/a	58–26	52–32	58–26	45–39
New Cross	47–37	43–40	42–42	41–43	56–28		63–21	49–35	41–42	44–40
Norwich	57–27	48–36	46–38	38–46	36–48	37–47		47–37	50–34	56–28
Wembley	40–44	54–30	39–45	59–25	38–46	n/a	48–36		49–35	51–33
West Ham	55–29	44–40	45–39	58–26	52–32	40–44	51–33	40–44		32–52
Wimbledon	46–38	60–24	56–28	34–50	31–53	44–40	52–32	47–37	41–43	

Legend: Blue = home team win; Yellow = draw; Red = away team win.

== Top ten riders (league only) ==
	Rider	Nat	Team	C.M.A.
1	Ronnie Moore	(New Zealand)	Wimbledon	10.63
2	Jack Young	(Australia)	West Ham	10.61
3	Alan Hunt	(England)	Birmingham	10.47
4	Olle Nygren	(Sweden)	Bristol	10.25
5	Freddie Williams	(Wales)	Wembley	10.13
6	Arthur Forrest	(England)	Bradford	9.94
7	Split Waterman	(England)	Harringay	9.84
8	Eric Williams	(Wales)	Wembley	9.66
9	Aub Lawson	(Australia)	Norwich	9.19
10	Tommy Price	(England)	Wembley	9.13

== National Trophy ==
The 1953 National Trophy was the 16th edition of the Knockout Cup.

First round

Date	Team one	Score	Team two
25/04	Ipswich	57-51	Southampton
25/04	Swindon	68-40	Exeter
24/04	Plymouth	54-54	Oxford
23/04	Cardiff	80-28	St Austell
23/04	Oxford	66-42	Plymouth
21/04	Southampton	74-33	Ipswich
21/04	St Austell	55-53	Cardiff
20/04	Exeter	60-48	Swindon

Second round

Date	Team one	Score	Team two
19/05	Cardiff	42.5-65.5	Leicester
15/05	Leicester	70-38	Cardiff
15/05	Motherwell	78-30	Swindon
15/05	Wolverhampton	71-37	Southampton
14/05	Oxford	51-57	Rayleigh
12/05	Southampton	49-59	Wolverhampton
11/05	Liverpool	40-68	Coventry
09/05	Coventry	76-32	Liverpool
09/05	Edinburgh	47-61	Glasgow White City
09/05	Rayleigh	67-41	Oxford
09/05	Stoke	69-39	Yarmouth
09/05	Swindon	62-46	Motherwell
06/05	Glasgow White City	75-33	Edinburgh
05/05	Yarmouth	52-55	Stoke

Third round

Date	Team one	Score	Team two
24/06	Glasgow White City	76-32	Wolverhampton
29/05	Leicester	68-40	Rayleigh
29/05	Motherwell	73-35	Poole
29/05	Wolverhampton	49-59	Glasgow White City
25/05	Poole	62-46	Motherwell
23/05	Coventry	69-39	Stoke
23/05	Rayleigh	72-36	Leicester
21/05	Stoke	71-37	Coventry

Fourth round

Date	Team one	Score	Team two
11/07	Bradford Odsal	63-45	Bristol
04/07	Belle Vue	50-58	Wimbledon
04/07	Harringay	85-23	Motherwell
04/07	Norwich	71-37	West Ham
04/07	Rayleigh	64-44	Glasgow White City
03/07	Bristol	65-42	Bradford Odsal
03/07	Motherwell	63-45	Harringay
01/07	Glasgow White City	69-39	Rayleigh
30/06	West Ham	59-49	Norwich
29/06	Wimbledon	77-31	Belle Vue

Quarterfinals

Date	Team one	Score	Team two
01/08	Stoke	38-70	Wimbledon
25/07	Norwich	58-49	Bristol
24/07	Bristol	64-44	Norwich
20/07	Wimbledon	89-19	Stoke
18/07	Harringay	40-68	Wembley
16/07	Wembley	60-48	Harringay
15/07	Glasgow White City	56-52	Birmingham
11/07	Birmingham	70-38	Glasgow White City

Semifinals

Date	Team one	Score	Team two
10/08	Wimbledon	59-49	Bristol
08/08	Birmingham	62.5-45.5	Wembley
07/08	Bristol	46-62	Wimbledon
06/08	Wembley	78-29	Birmingham

=== Final ===
First leg

7 September 1953

Wimbledon Dons Ronnie Moore 17 Cyril Brine 14 Norman Parker 11 Geoff Mardon 10 Peter Moore 9 Barry Briggs 3 Don Perry 1 Reg Trott 0	68 – 40	Wembley Lions Eric Williams 11 Tommy Price 9 Bill Kitchen 5 Eric French 4 Trevor Redmond 4 Jimmy Gooch 3 Brian Crutcher 2 Freddie Williams 2

Wimbledon Stadium

Second leg

10 September 1953

Wembley Lions Freddie Williams 17 Tommy Price 15 Eric Williams 8 Brian Crutcher 7 Trevor Redmond 7 Bill Kitchen 5 Eric French 4 Jimmy Gooch 3	66 – 42	Wimbledon Dons Ronnie Moore 11 Norman Parker 8 Peter Moore 7 Barry Briggs 6 Geoff Mardon 5 Don Perry 3 Cyril Brine 1 Reg Trott 1

Wembley Stadium

Wimbledon were National Trophy Champions, winning on aggregate 110–106.

== London Cup ==
First round

Team one	Score	Team two
Wimbledon	61–46, 56–52	Wembley

Semi final round

Team one	Score	Team two
Wimbledon	46–58, 38–69	West Ham
Harringay	64–44, w/o	New Cross

=== Final ===
First leg

1 August 1953

Harringay Jack Biggs 1 Maury Dunn 12 Jeff Lloyd 12 Split Waterman 10 Ron How 8 Frank Lawrence 5 Ken Walsh 1 Allan Quinn 0	60–48	West Ham Jack Young 18, Bert Roger 10 Malcolm Craven 6 Wally Green 4 Howdy Byford 4 Keith Gurtner 4 Kid Curtis 2 Pat Clarke 0

Wembley Stadium

Second leg

4 August 1953

West Ham Jack Young 17 Bert Roger 11 Keith Gurtner 8 Malcolm Craven 7 Basse Hveem 6 Howdy Byford 4 Pat Clarke 4 Wally Green 4	58–50	Harringay Maury Dunn 11 Jack Biggs 12 Jeff Lloyd 9 Ron How 8 Split Waterman 7 Frank Lawrence 2 Arthur Atkinson 0 Alan Quinn 0

Plough Lane

Harringay won on aggregate 110–106

== Midland Cup ==
Birmingham won the Midland Cup, which consisted of six teams. There were two teams from division 1 and four teams from division 2.

First round

Team one	Team two	Score
Leicester	Stoke	65–31, 46–50

Semi final round

Team one	Team two	Score
Leicester	Coventry	50–46, 43–53
Birmingham	Bradford	73–25, 59–37

=== Final ===
First leg

26 September 1953

Birmingham Alan Hunt 15 Graham Warren 9 Harry Bastable 9 Arthur Payne 7 Ron Mountford 6 Ron Barrett 6 Eric Boothroyd 5 Bob Roger 4	61–35	Coventry Charlie New 13 Johnnie Reason 9 Derrick Tailby 5 Vic Emms 3 Reg Duval 2 Les Hewitt 1 Jack Wright 1 Stan Williams 1

Perry Barr Stadium

Second leg

3 October 1953

Coventry Charlie New 14 Derrick Tailby 7 Stan Williams 4 Vic Emms 4 Reg Duval 4 Johnnie Reason 3 Les Hewitt 2 Jack Wright 0	38–58	Birmingham Alan Hunt 14 Ron Mountford 12 Graham Warren 9 Harry Bastable 7 Eric Boothroyd 7 Arthur Payne 6 Ron Barrett 3 Bob Roger 0

Brandon Stadium

Birmingham won on aggregate 119–73

== Riders & final averages ==
Belle Vue

- (New Zealand) Ron Johnston 7.88
- (England) Peter Craven 7.74
- (England) Ken Sharples 8.27
- (England) Jack Parker 7.00
- (England) Louis Lawson 6.69
- (England) Dick Fisher 4.62
- (England) Harry Edwards 4.22
- (Scotland) Jock Grierson 3.87
- (Scotland) Willie Wilson 3.86
- (England) Bob Fletcher 3.74
- (Sweden) Olle Segerström 2.00
- (England) Val Morton 2.00

Birmingham

- (England) Alan Hunt 10.47
- (Australia) Graham Warren 7.67
- (Sweden) Dan Forsberg 7.64
- (England) Eric Boothroyd 7.19
- (Australia) Arthur Payne 7.19
- (England) Harry Bastable 6.36
- (England) Ron Mountford 5.97
- (England) Phil Malpass 4.57
- (England) Bob Roger 4.48
- (England) Ron Barrett 4.21
- (England) Ron Mason 3.00
- (Australia) Bill Jemison 1.25
- (England) Lionel Watling (James Goldingay) 1.18

Bradford

- (England) Arthur Forrest 9.94
- (England) Eddie Rigg 8.00
- (England) Arthur Wright 7.14
- (Australia) Dick Seers 6.26
- (England) Ron Clarke 6.20
- (England) Keith Milner 5.50
- (England) Dent Oliver 5.69
- (England) Arthur Atkinson 5.04
- (England) Arthur Bush 5.00
- (Australia) Bill Longley 3.69
- (England) Wal Morton 4.27

Bristol

- (Sweden) Olle Nygren 10.25
- (England) Dick Bradley 8.13
- (England) Eric Salmon 7.88
- (England) Billy Hole 7.55
- (England) Jack Unstead 6.67
- (England) Johnny Hole 6.10
- (England) Chris Boss 5.80
- (Australia) Chum Taylor 4.37
- (England) Geoff Pymar 4.24

Harringay

- (England) Split Waterman 9.84
- (Australia) Jack Biggs 9.00
- (England) Jeff Lloyd 8.14
- (New Zealand) Maurice Dunn 7.73
- (England) Ron How 7.60
- (England) Frank Lawrence 5.87
- (England) Stan Clark 5.33
- (Australia) Ken Walsh 5.00
- (England) Arthur Atkinson 4.68
- (Australia) Allan Quinn 4.00

New Cross (withdrew)

- (Scotland) Jock Grierson
- (England) Cyril Roger
- (Sweden) Olle Nygren
- (England) Bert Roger
- (Australia) Merv Harding
- (Australia) Bill Longley
- (England) Bob Roger
- (Republic of Ireland) Eric French
- (England) Frank Lawrence

Norwich

- (Australia) Aub Lawson 9.19
- (England) Cyril Roger 7.48
- (England) Fred Rogers 6.76
- (England) Billy Bales 6.40
- (New Zealand) Merv Neil 5.60
- (England) Phil Clarke 5.49
- (England) Fred Pawson 5.12
- (England) Roy Craighead 3.40
- (Australia) Alec Hunter 2.29
- (England) Jack Freeman 2.00

Wembley

- (Wales) Freddie Williams 10.13
- (Wales) Eric Williams 9.66
- (England) Tommy Price 9.13
- (England) Brian Crutcher 7.87
- (England) Bill Kitchen 6.26
- (England) Jimmy Gooch 4.78
- (Republic of Ireland) Eric French 6.23
- (New Zealand) Trevor Redmond 6.05
- (England) George Wilks 4.57

West Ham

- (Australia) Jack Young 10.61
- (Norway) Basse Hveem 8.00
- (England) Wally Green 7.43
- (England) Pat Clark 7.72
- (England) Howdy Byford 4.68
- (England) Bert Roger 4.49
- (England) Malcolm Craven 5.50
- (Australia) Keith Gurtner 3.92
- (England) Kid Curtis 2.86
- (Australia) Cliff Watson 2.29

Wimbledon

- (New Zealand) Ronnie Moore 10.63
- (New Zealand) Geoff Mardon 8.66
- (Sweden) Sune Karlsson 8.00
- (Australia) Peter Moore 6.97
- (New Zealand) Barry Briggs 6.31
- (England) Norman Parker 7.50
- (Republic of Ireland) Dom Perry 5.57
- (Australia) Bill Longley 5.05
- (England) Reg Trott 4.49
- (England) Cyril Brine 4.42
- (England) Cyril Maidment 2.72
- (England) Dennis Gray 1.60

== See also ==
- List of United Kingdom Speedway League Champions
- Knockout Cup (speedway)
