= 1947 Speedway National League =

British speedway season

- League: National League Division One
- No. of competitors: 7
- Champions: Wembley Lions
- National Trophy: Belle Vue Aces
- British Speedway Cup: Wembley Lions
- Riders' champion: Jack Parker
- London Cup: New Cross Rangers
- Highest average: Vic Duggan
- Division/s below: National League (Div 2); National League (Div 3)

The 1947 National League Division One was the 13th season of speedway in the United Kingdom and the second post-war season of the highest tier of motorcycle speedway in Great Britain.

== Summary ==
Harringay Racers rejoined the league. Wembley Lions retained the title. Belle Vue retained the National Trophy.

== Final Table Division One ==
Pos	Team	PL	W	D	L	Pts
1	Wembley Lions	24	19	0	5	38
2	Belle Vue Aces	24	15	1	8	31
3	Wimbledon Dons	24	13	1	10	27
4	Odsal Boomerangs	24	10	1	13	21
5	New Cross Rangers	24	10	0	14	20
6	West Ham Hammers	24	8	0	16	16
7	Harringay Racers	24	7	1	16	15

== Fixtures & results ==
=== A fixtures ===
Home \ Away	BV	BRA	HAR	NC	WEM	WH	WIM
Belle Vue		45–39	54–30	47–37	35–49	57–27	38–46
Bradford	42–42		41–43	46–38	50–33	52–32	40–44
Harringay	47–33	38–45		44–40	34–46	42–41	42–42
New Cross	36–46	38–45	42–41		33–51	59–25	47–37
Wembley	54–30	52–31	52–32	50–34		60–24	41–42
West Ham	41–43	38–45	44–40	47–37	42–41		39–45
Wimbledon	51–33	50–33	40–44	50–33	43–39	54–30	

Legend: Blue = home team win; Yellow = draw; Red = away team win.

=== B fixtures ===
Home \ Away	BV	BRA	HAR	NC	WEM	WH	WIM
Belle Vue		51–33	46–38	50–34	49–35	52–29	41–40
Bradford	37–47		53–30	44–37	38–46	51–33	50–34
Harringay	38–46	55–28		39–44	38–46	50–34	34–49
New Cross	49–35	58–26	52–31		39–45	59–25	50–34
Wembley	49–35	60–24	57–26	57–27		55–27	47–35
West Ham	48–36	52–32	43–40	45–39	40–42		44–40
Wimbledon	36–47	42–41	50–34	39–45	38–46	43–39	

Legend: Blue = home team win; Yellow = draw; Red = away team win.

== British Speedway Cup ==
On account of the small number of teams in the league the British Speedway Cup was run in a league format. Wembley Lions won all their matches, home and away, to complete a double.

Pos	Team	PL	W	D	L	Pts
1	Wembley Lions	12	12	0	0	24
2	New Cross Rangers	12	8	0	4	16
3	Wimbledon Dons	12	5	1	6	11
4	Belle Vue Aces	12	5	0	7	10
5	Harringay Racers	12	5	0	7	10
6	West Ham Hammers	12	4	0	8	8
7	Odsal Boomerangs	12	2	1	9	5

Home \ Away	BV	BRA	HAR	NC	WEM	WH	WIM
Belle Vue		61–35	45–50	56–40	47–49	49–46	60–36
Bradford	48–47		63–33	34–62	44–52	46–50	48–48
Harringay	36–60	61–35		43–53	32–64	55–41	53–42
New Cross	57.5–37.5	64–31	63–33		45–47	66–29	49–46
Wembley	62–31	53–43	65–31	60–36		76–20	54–41
West Ham	53.5–42.5	50–44	47–48	33–60	40–52		50–46
Wimbledon	54–42	53–43	54–42	52–43	42–54	57–39	

Legend: Blue = home team win; Yellow = draw; Red = away team win.

== Top ten riders (league only) ==
	Rider	Nat	Team	C.M.A.
1	Vic Duggan	(Australia)	Harringay	11.54
2	Bill Kitchen	(England)	Wembley	10.74
3	Norman Parker	(England)	Wimbledon	10.35
4	Alec Statham	(England)	Odsal	10.25
5	Tommy Price	(England)	Wembley	10.00
6=	Eric Chitty	(Canada)	West Ham	9.54
6=	Malcolm Craven	(England)	New Cross	9.54
8	George Wilks	(England)	Wembley	9.46
9	Eric Langton	(England)	Belle Vue	9.44
10	Jack Parker	(England)	Belle Vue	9.32

== National Trophy ==
The 1947 National Trophy was the tenth edition of the Knockout Cup.

During the National Trophy quarter final match between Wembley and Harringay (on 15 August) the 27-year-old Wembley rider Nelson 'Bronco' Wilson received fatal injuries in the fourth heat. He died in the Prince of Wales Hospital, Tottenham, the following day from a fractured skull. Remarkably another rider Cyril Anderson of the Norwich Stars was killed instantly on the same evening, during the Division Two Best Pairs.

Qualifying Middlesbrough and Norwich qualified for the quarter finals by virtue of finishing 1st & 2nd in the Second Division Cup.

Quarterfinals

Date	Team one	Score	Team two
07/08	Wembley	61–45	Harringay
07/08	Middlesbrough	40–68	Wimbledon
09/08	Belle Vue	67–41	New Cross
11/08	Wimbledon	77–31	Middlesbrough
12/08	West Ham	54–54	Bradford Odsal
13/08	New Cross	61–46	Belle Vue
15/08	Harringay	47–58	Wembley
16/08	Bradford Odsal	53–55	West Ham

Semifinals

Date	Team one	Score	Team two
25/08	Wimbledon	59–49	Belle Vue
02/09	West Ham	55–51	Wembley
04/09	Wembley	68–40	West Ham
06/09	Belle Vue	82–25	Wimbledon

=== Final ===
First leg

9 October 1947

Wembley Lions Tommy Price 14 Bill Kitchen 13 George Wilks 10 Split Waterman 6 Bill Gilbert 6 Bob Wells 5 Charlie May 1 Roy Craighead 0	55 – 53	Belle Vue Aces Eric Langton 13 Jack Parker 13 Louis Lawson 8 Jim Boyd 7 Wally Lloyd 6 Wally Hull 3 Dent Oliver 2 Bill Pitcher 1

Wembley Stadium

Second leg

11 October 1947

Belle Vue Aces Jack Parker 16 Louis Lawson 12 Eric Langton 11 Wally Lloyd 6 Dent Oliver 7 Jim Boyd 6 Wally Hull 4 Bill Pitcher 1	63 – 45	Wembley Lions Bill Kitchen 14 Tommy Price 13 Split Waterman 9 George Wilks 4 Roy Craighead 3 Bob Wells 2 Charlie May 0 Bill Gilbert 0

Hyde Road Stadium

Belle Vue were National Trophy Champions, winning on aggregate 116–100.

== Riders' Championship ==
Jack Parker won the British Riders' Championship final held at Empire Stadium on 11 September. Parker won the title after a run off and also broke the halfway (2 laps) track record (37.6 secs) in heat 2. There were three qualifying rounds, with 28 riders progressing to the Championship round, held over seven meetings.

Pos.	Rider	Heat Scores	Total
1	(England) Jack Parker	3 3 3 2 3	14+3
2	(England) Bill Kitchen	3 3 2 3 3	14+2
3	(Australia) Bill Longley	2 1 2 3 3	11
4	(Canada) Eric Chitty	1 2 3 2 2	10
5	(England) George Wilks	2 2 2 1 2	9
6	(England) Vic Duggan	3 2 3 F -	8
7	(England) Eric Langton	0 1 3 2 2	8
8	(England) Frank Hodgson	1 3 2 1 1	8
9	(England) Ernie Price	2 2 2 1 1	8
10	(England) Norman Parker	3 1 1 0 3	8
11	(Australia) Ron Johnson	2 F 1 3 F	6
12	(Australia) Lionel Van Praag	1 3 0 2 0	6
13	(England) Tommy Price	0 3 1 1 1	6
14	(England) Les Wotton	1 0 1 0 2	4
15	(England) Geoff Pymar	0 F F 3 1	4
16	(England) Bill Pitcher	1 0 0 1 F	2
16	(Australia) Aub Lawson (res)	0 0 - - -	0
17	(England) Dent Oliver (res)	0 0 - - -	0
18	(Australia) Frank Dolan	0 0 0 0 0	0

- f=fell

== London Cup ==
First round

Team one	Score	Team two
New Cross	64–44, 55–52	Wimbledon

Semi final round

Team one	Score	Team two
Wembley	69–38, 51–57	West Ham
New Cross	74–34, 72–36	Harringay

=== Final ===
First leg

17 September 1947

New Cross Ron Johnson 11 Bill Longley 10 Lionel Van Praag 7 Jeff Lloyd 8 Ray Moore 7 Frank Lawrence 2 Eric French 2 Geoff Pymar 2	49–58	Wembley Bill Kitchen 17 George Wilks 12 Split Waterman 11 Tommy Price 7 Bob Wells 5 Roy Craighead 3 Bill Gilbert 3 Charlie May 0

New Cross Stadium

Second leg

18 September 1947

Wembley Tommy Price 14 Bill Kitchen 12 Bill Gilbert 6 George Wilks 4 Bob Wells 4 Charlie May 3 Split Waterman 3 Roy Craighead 1	47–61	New Cross Ron Johnson 15 Jeff Lloyd 13 Bill Longley 10 Geoff Pymar 8 Eric French 6 Ray Moore 5 Lionel Van Praag 4 Frank Lawrence 0

Wembley Stadium

New Cross won on aggregate 110–105

== Riders & final averages ==
Belle Vue

- (England) Eric Langton 9.44
- (England) Jack Parker 9.32
- (England) Dent Oliver 8.50
- (England) Wally Lloyd 7.87
- (England) Bill Pitcher 7.29
- (England) Jim Boyd 6.68
- (England) Louis Lawson 5.39
- (England) Ron Mason 4.47
- (New Zealand) Dick Campbell 4.44
- (England) Wally Hull 3.80
- (England) Brian Wilson 3.36

Harringay

- (Australia) Vic Duggan 11.54
- (Australia) Frank Dolan 8.00
- (Australia) Ray Duggan 7.32
- (England) Joe Abbott 6.53
- (England) Wal Morton 4.78
- (Australia) Buck Whitby 4.16
- (Australia) Jack Arnfield 3.49
- (England) Nobby Stock 4.20
- (Australia) Norman Lindsay 3.18
- (Australia) Jack Biggs 3.00
- (England) Danny Lee 2.11
- (England) Joe Bowkis 1.48

New Cross

- (England) Ron Johnson 8.88
- (England) Jeff Lloyd 7.43
- (Australia) Bill Longley 7.83
- (England) Geoff Pymar 7.71
- (Australia) Lionel Van Praag 7.68
- (England) Ray Moore 5.04
- (Republic of Ireland) Eric French 5.96
- (England) Frank Lawrence 3.86
- (South Africa) Keith Harvey 3.20
- (England) Mick Mitchell 4.20

Odsal

- (England) Alec Statham 10.25
- (England) Ernie Price 8.64
- (England) Ron Clarke 8.51
- (Australia) Max Grosskreutz 7.07
- (England) Oliver Hart 6.90
- (England) Ron Mason 6.29
- (England) Fred Tuck 4.90
- (England) Eddie Rigg 4.00
- (England) Bill Osborne 3.48
- (Scotland) Bill Baird 3.24
- (England) Fred Rogers 3.00
- (England) Jack White 2.40
- (England) Stan Beardsall 2.29
- (New Zealand) George Mudgway 1.18
- (England) Al Allison 1.00

Wembley

- (England) Bill Kitchen 10.74
- (England) Tommy Price 10.00
- (England) George Wilks 9.46
- (England) Split Waterman 7.75
- (England) Bronco Wilson 6.21
- (England) Bill Gilbert 5.47
- (England) Bob Wells 4.88
- (England) Roy Craighead 6.10
- (England) Charlie May 3.33

West Ham

- (Canada) Eric Chitty 9.54
- (England) Malcolm Craven 9.54
- (England) Tommy Croombs 6.09
- (England) Bob Harrison 5.78
- (England) Howdy Byford 5.67
- (England) Cliff Parkinson 5.60
- (Australia) Aub Lawson 5.06
- (Australia) Cliff Watson 4.46
- (England) Benny King 3.83
- (Australia) Buck Whitby 3.35
- (England) Phil Bishop 2.58
- (Canada) Bill Matthews 2.55
- (England) Jack Cooley 0.92

Wimbledon

- (England) Norman Parker 10.35
- (England) Les Wotton 8.50
- (England) Lloyd Goffe 7.70
- (England) Cyril Brine 6.00
- (England) Mike Erskine 5.98
- (England) Arch Windmill 5.36
- (England) George Saunders 4.51
- (England) Dick Harris 5.61
- (England) Ron Howes 1.33

== See also ==
- List of United Kingdom Speedway League Champions
- Knockout Cup (speedway)
