= 1946 Speedway National League =

British speedway league season

- League: National League
- No. of competitors: 6
- Champions: Wembley Lions
- National Trophy: Belle Vue Aces
- A.C.U Cup: Belle Vue Aces
- Riders' champion: Tommy Price
- London Cup: Wembley Lions
- Highest average: Eric Langton
- Division/s below: Northern League

The 1946 National League was the 12th season of the highest tier of motorcycle speedway in Great Britain and the first post-war season.

The league had been abandoned seven years previously due to the outbreak of World War II. Record attendances were attracted with Wembley Lions attracting an average of 50,000 and the league as a whole a total of six and a half million. From the abandoned 1939 season, Southampton Saints and Harringay Tigers were no longer racing whilst Odsal Boomerangs brought National League speedway to Bradford for the first time.

Wembley Lions won their second National League title.

On 6 July, a crowd of 34,0000 at Odsal Stadium witnessed Odsal Boomerangs lose to Belle Vue Aces. During the match Albert 'Aussie' Rosenfeld, son of Albert Rosenfeld hit the fence and was taken to St Luke's Hospital, Bradford, with a suspected fractured skull. He died 10 days later, on 16 July 1946.

== National League Final table ==
| Pos | Team | PL | W | D | L | Pts |
|---|---|---|---|---|---|---|
| 1 | Wembley Lions | 20 | 18 | 0 | 2 | 36 |
| 2 | Belle Vue Aces | 20 | 12 | 1 | 7 | 25 |
| 3 | Odsal Boomerangs | 20 | 9 | 1 | 10 | 19 |
| 4 | Wimbledon Dons | 20 | 8 | 1 | 11 | 17 |
| 5 | New Cross Rangers | 20 | 6 | 1 | 13 | 13 |
| 6 | West Ham Hammers | 20 | 4 | 2 | 14 | 10 |

== Fixtures & results ==
=== A fixtures ===
| Home \ Away | BV | BRA | NC | WEM | WH | WIM |
|---|---|---|---|---|---|---|
| Belle Vue | | 49–33 | 29–55 | 34–49 | 46–37 | 49–35 |
| Odsal | 32–52 | | 54–23 | 52–32 | 48–36 | 54–30 |
| New Cross | 46–37 | 41–43 | | 36–48 | 46–36 | 42–41 |
| Wembley | 50–32 | 47–37 | 54–24 | | 47–36 | 48–35 |
| West Ham | 35–49 | 44–40 | 41–43 | 33–49 | | 42–41 |
| Wimbledon | 45–39 | 39–45 | 41–40 | 41–43 | 43–39 | |

Legend: Blue = home team win; Yellow = draw; Red = away team win.

=== B fixtures ===
| Home \ Away | BV | BRA | NC | WEM | WH | WIM |
|---|---|---|---|---|---|---|
| Belle Vue | | 54–30 | 56–28 | 51–33 | 53–31 | 47–37 |
| Odsal | 42–42 | | 45–39 | 38–46 | 48–36 | 41–43 |
| New Cross | 30–53 | 45–39 | | 37–46 | 38–46 | 39–45 |
| Wembley | 43–39 | 52–32 | 53–30 | | 59–24 | 46–36 |
| West Ham | 36–47 | 44–39 | 42–42 | 36–48 | | 42–42 |
| Wimbledon | 49–35 | 39–45 | 59–25 | 38–45 | 49–34 | |

Legend: Blue = home team win; Yellow = draw; Red = away team win.

== A.C.U. Cup ==
On account of the small number of teams in the league the ACU Cup was run in a league format. Belle Vue Aces came out on top.

=== Final table ===
| Pos | Team | PL | W | D | L | Pts |
|---|---|---|---|---|---|---|
| 1 | Belle Vue Aces | 10 | 8 | 0 | 2 | 16 |
| 2 | Wembley Lions | 10 | 6 | 1 | 3 | 13 |
| 3 | New Cross Rangers | 10 | 6 | 0 | 4 | 12 |
| 4 | Odsal Boomerangs | 10 | 4 | 1 | 5 | 9 |
| 5 | Wimbledon Dons | 10 | 4 | 0 | 6 | 8 |
| 6 | West Ham Hammers | 10 | 1 | 0 | 9 | 2 |

| Home \ Away | BV | BRA | NC | WEM | WH | WIM |
|---|---|---|---|---|---|---|
| Belle Vue | | 49–46 | 57–38 | 53–43 | 61–35 | 64–32 |
| Odsal | 44–51 | | 50–46 | 48–48 | 50–46 | 55–41 |
| New Cross | 49–47 | 50–46 | | 39–55 | 61–35 | 54–40 |
| Wembley | 46–50 | 68–27 | 57–37 | | 53–42 | 58–38 |
| West Ham | 45–50 | 46–50 | 52–54 | 50–46 | | 45–48 |
| Wimbledon | 50–46 | 48–47 | 45–50 | 47–48 | 51.5–44.5 | |

Legend: Blue = home team win; Yellow = draw; Red = away team win.

Such was the dearth of new riders caused by the war that all of the top ten riders were established pre-war riders and none were below the age of 32.

== Top Ten Riders (League only) ==
| | Rider | Nat | Team | C.M.A. |
|---|---|---|---|---|
| 1 | Eric Langton | (England) | Belle Vue Aces | 11.13 |
| 2 | Jack Parker | (England) | Belle Vue Aces | 11.00 |
| 3 | Bill Kitchen | (England) | Wembley Lions | 10.75 |
| 4 | Ron Johnson | (Australia) | New Cross Rangers | 10.69 |
| 5 | Eric Chitty | (Canada) | West Ham Hammers | 10.30 |
| 6 | Norman Parker | (England) | Wimbledon Dons | 10.12 |
| 7 | Tommy Price | (England) | Wembley Lions | 10.00 |
| 8 | Alec Statham | (England) | Odsal Boomerangs | 9.72 |
| 9 | Ron Clarke | (England) | Odsal Boomerangs | 9.50 |
| 10 | Bill Longley | (Australia) | Odsal Boomerangs | 9.20 |

== National Trophy ==
The 1946 National Trophy was the tenth edition (if including the 1939 abandoned competition) or ninth edition (if not including) of the Knockout Cup. Teams from the lower 1946 Speedway Northern League competed in the event.

First round

| Date | Team one | Score | Team two |
|---|---|---|---|
| 04/05 | Birmingham | 56–48 | Norwich |
| 27/04 | Norwich | 53–51 | Birmingham |

Second round

| Date | Team one | Score | Team two |
|---|---|---|---|
| 25/05 | Birmingham | 61–45 | Middlesbrough |
| 16/05 | Middlesbrough | 58–50 | Birmingham |
| 29/04 | Newcastle | 49–56 | Middlesbrough |
| 25/04 | Middlesbrough | 55–51 | Newcastle |
| 25/04 | Sheffield | 61–47 | Glasgow White City |
| 24/04 | Glasgow White City | 61–47 | Sheffield |
| 09/05 replay | Sheffield | 63–44 | Glasgow White City |
| 08/05 replay | Glasgow White City | 62–45 | Sheffield |

Quarterfinals

| Date | Team one | Score | Team two |
|---|---|---|---|
| 22/06 | Birmingham | 31–77 | Wembley |
| 13/06 | Wembley | 80–27 | Birmingham |
| 20/07 | Bradford Odsal | 72–36 | Sheffield |
| 04/07 | Sheffield | 48–60 | Bradford Odsal |
| 02/07 | West Ham | 55–52 | Wimbledon |
| 01/07 | Wimbledon | 63–44 | West Ham |
| 08/06 | Belle Vue | 58–49 | New Cross |
| 12/06 | New Cross | 50–57 | Belle Vue |

Semifinals

| Date | Team one | Score | Team two |
|---|---|---|---|
| 25/07 | Wembley | 50–57 | Belle Vue |
| 13/07 | Belle Vue | 60–48 | Wembley |
| 19/08 | Wimbledon | 62–46 | Bradford Odsal |
| 03/08 | Bradford Odsal | 53–55 | Wimbledon |

=== Final ===
First leg

16 September 1946

| Wimbledon Dons Norman Parker 13 Lloyd Goffe 10 Oliver Hart 9 George Saunders 9 Arch Windmill 6 Dick Harris 6 Mike Erskine 5 Cyril Brine 1 | 61 – 46 | Belle Vue Aces Jack Parker 13 Bill Pitcher 10 Wally Lloyd 10 Eric Langton 8 Ron Mason 2 Jim Boyd 2 Ralph Horne 1 Dent Oliver 0 |

Wimbledon Stadium

Second leg

21 September 1946

| Belle Vue Aces Wally Lloyd 18 Jack Parker 14 Bill Pitcher 11 Eric Langton 8 Jim Boyd 6 Dent Oliver 3 Louis Lawson 2 Ron Mason 1 | 63 – 45 | Wimbledon Dons Norman Parker 11 Oliver Hart 10 Dick Harris 7 Mike Erskine 7 Lloyd Goffe 3 George Saunders 3 Cyril Brine 2 Arch Windmill 2 |

Hyde Road Stadium

Belle Vue were National Trophy Champions, winning on aggregate 109–106.

== Riders' Championship ==
Tommy Price won the British Riders' Championship final held at Empire Stadium on 12 September, in front of 85,000 spectators. There were no less than 23 qualifying rounds, where riders from National and Northern League tracks respectively, competed in six meetings each.

| Pos. | Rider | Heat Scores | Total |
|---|---|---|---|
| 1 | (England) Tommy Price | 3 3 3 3 3 | 15 |
| 2 | (England) Bill Kitchen | 3 3 2 2 3 | 13 |
| 3 | (England) Jack Parker | 3 f 3 3 3 | 12 |
| 4 | (England) Eric Langton | 2 1 3 3 2 | 11 |
| 5 | (England) Malcolm Craven | 3 2 f 2 3 | 10 |
| 6 | (England) Norman Parker | 2 3 1 2 2 | 10 |
| 7 | (Canada) Eric Chitty | 2 1 3 1 2 | 9 |
| 8 | (England) Frank Hodgson | 1 3 2 1 1 | 8 |
| 9 | (Australia) Ron Johnson | f 2 3 2 f | 7 |
| 10 | (Australia) Bert Spencer | 1 1 1 0 2 | 5 |
| 11 | (England) Wally Lloyd | 0 2 2 0 1 | 5 |
| 12 | (England) Jeff Lloyd | 0 1 0 2 1 | 4 |
| 13 | (Australia) Bill Longley | 2 2 0 0 0 | 4 |
| 14 | (England) Tommy Allott | 0 0 0 1 1 | 2 |
| 15 | (England) Ernie Price | 1 0 1 0 0 | 2 |
| 16 | (England) Ron Clarke (res) | 1 1 0 | 2 |
| 16 | (England) Alec Statham | 0 0 0 - - | 0 |

- f=fell

== London Cup ==
First round

| Team one | Score | Team two |
|---|---|---|
| New Cross | 59–49, 46–60 | Wimbledon |
| West Ham | 62–46, 43–65 | Wembley |

=== Final ===
First leg

26 August 1946

| Wimbledon Norman Parker 17 Oliver Hart 13 Archie Windmill 7 Cyril Brine 6 Dick Harris 2 George Saunders 1 Lloyd Goffe 1 Charlie Dugard 1 | 53–55 | Wembley Bill Kitchen 13 George Wilks 11 Tommy Price 9 Bill Gilbert 9 Alf Bottoms 7 Bob Wells 4 Roy Craighead 2 Charlie May 0 |

Plough Lane

Second leg

29 August 1946

| Wembley Tommy Price 16 Bill Kitchen 14 Bill Gilbert 8 Alf Bottoms 7 Roy Craighead 2 George Wilks 2 Bob Wells 1 Charlie May 1 | 66–42 | Wimbledon Norman Parker 10 Lloyd Goffe 7 Oliver Hart 7 Cyril Brine 7 Archie Windmill 6 George Saunders 3 Dick Harris 2 harlie Dugard 0 |

Wembley Stadium

Wembley won on aggregate 121–95

== Riders & final averages ==
Belle Vue

- (England) Eric Langton 11.13
- (England) Jack Parker 11.00
- (England) Wally Lloyd 8.46
- (England) Bill Pitcher 6.91
- (England) Dent Oliver 5.00
- (England) Jim Boyd 4.92
- (England) Ron Mason 3.90
- (England) Harold Jackson 4.67
- (England) Louis Lawson 1.45

New Cross

- (England) Ron Johnson 10.69
- (Republic of Ireland) Eric French 9.52
- (England) Geoff Pymar 8.63
- (England) Les Wotton 8.24
- (England) Phil Bishop 4.14
- (England) Mick Mitchell 4.12
- (England) Frank Lawrence 3.78
- (South Africa) Keith Harvey 3.40
- (England) Les Webbon 3.06
- (England) Ray Moore 2.29
- (England) Jack Cooley 2.13
- (England) Jack White 0.57

Odsal

- (England) Alec Statham 9.72
- (England) Ron Clarke 9.50
- (Australia) Bill Longley 9.20
- (England) Ernie Price 8.39
- (England) Fred Tuck 6.90
- (England) Albert Rosenfeld 2.93
- (England) Vic Pitcher 2.86
- (England) Bill Osborne 2.00
- (England) Red Hamley 1.33
- (England) Jack White 1.25
- (England) Charlie Oates 1.24
- (England) Stan Beardsall 0.80
- (England) Ron Stringer 0.60

Wembley

- (England) Bill Kitchen 10.75
- (England) Tommy Price 10.00
- (England) George Wilks 9.00
- (England) Alf Bottoms 5.90
- (England) Bill Gilbert 5.72
- (England) Bob Wells 5.66
- (England) Roy Craighead 5.50
- (England) Bronco Wilson 5.11
- (England) Charlie May 4.90

West Ham

- (Canada) Eric Chitty 10.30
- (England) Malcolm Craven 9.03
- (England) Colin Watson 8.40
- (England) Bob Harrison 7.89
- (England) Jack Cooley 4.73
- (England) Cyril Anderson 4.14
- (England) Benny King 3.47
- (Australia) Buck Whitby 3.39
- (England) Frank Lawrence 3.23
- (England) Ron Howes 3.23
- (England) George Gower 3.00
- (England) Bert Roger 2.45
- (England) Dick Geary 2.29

Wimbledon

- (England) Norman Parker 10.12
- (England) Lloyd Goffe 8.23
- (England) Oliver Hart 7.58
- (England) Mike Erskine 6.29
- (England) George Saunders 5.82
- (England) Dick Harris 5.69
- (England) Arch Windmill 5.38
- (England) Charlie Dugard 4.38
- (England) Alex Gray 4.00
- (England) Cyril Brine 4.00

== See also ==
- List of United Kingdom Speedway League Champions
- Knockout Cup (speedway)
