= 1951 Individual Speedway World Championship =

6th edition of the World motorcycle speedway championship

Seasons
- ← 1950 1952 →

The 1951 Individual Speedway World Championship was the sixth edition of the official World Championship to determine the world champion rider.

Australia's Jack Young won the World Championship. Young won a run-off for the title with British rider Split Waterman and fellow Australian Jack Biggs after all three riders had finished on 12 points.

The 1951 World Final was held before a reported crowd of 93,000 at Wembley Stadium.

== First qualifying round ==
- The top 13 riders qualify for the second qualifying round.

Date	Venue	Winner
31 May	Penarth Road Stadium	Derek Tailby
2 June	Aldershot Stadium	Trevor Redmond
2 June	Rayleigh Weir Stadium	Tony Lewis
2 June	Abbey Stadium	Hugh Geddes
4 June	County Ground Stadium	Johnny Sargeant

== Second qualifying round ==
- Top Qualifiers go forward to the Championship round.

Date	Venue	Winner
10 July	Ashfield Stadium	Eric Williams
10 July	Banister Court Stadium	Tom Oakley
10 July	Yarmouth Stadium	Fred Brand
11 July	Highbury Stadium (Fleetwood)	Wilf Jay
11 July	White City Stadium, Glasgow	Tommy Miller
11 July	The Shay	Arthur Forrest
12 July	Oxford Stadium	Jack Young
13 July	Leicester Stadium	Geoff Mardon
13 July	The Stadium, Motherwell	Gordon McGregor
13 July	Brough Park Stadium	Dick Campbell
16 July	Dudley Wood Stadium	Phil Clarke
16 July	Stanley Stadium	Ken Sharples
16 July	Walthamstow Stadium	Jim Boyd
21 July	Brandon Stadium	Tommy Miller
21 July	Old Meadowbank	Jack Young
21 July	Sun Street Stadium	Bruce Abernethy
21 July	The Firs Stadium	Bob Leverenz

== Championship Round ==
- Top 16 qualify for World final, 17th & 18th reserves for World final

Date	Venue	Winner
13 August	Wimbledon Stadium	Split Waterman
14 August	West Ham Stadium	Bruce Abernethy
15 August	New Cross Stadium	Bob Leverenz
16 August	Wembley Stadium	Freddie Williams
18 August	Hyde Road Stadium	Bruce Semmens
18 August	Perry Barr Stadium	Alan Hunt
18 August	Odsal Stadium	Eddie Rigg
31 August	Knowle Stadium	Norman Parker
31 August	Harringay Stadium	Jack Biggs

=== Scores ===
- Top 16 qualify for World final, 17th & 18th reserves for World final

Pos.	Rider	Total pts
1	(Australia) Jack Biggs	29
2	(England) Split Waterman	27
3	(England) Alan Hunt	26
4	(Australia) Aub Lawson	25
5	(New Zealand) Ronnie Moore	25
6	(Wales) Freddie Williams	24
7	(England) Louis Lawson	23
8	(Australia) Bob Leverenz	23
9	(England) Norman Parker	23
10	(United States) Ernie Roccio	23
11	(Wales) Eric Williams	23
12	(Australia) Jack Young	23
13	(England) Cyril Brine	22
14	(England) Jeff Lloyd	22
15	(England) Jack Parker	22
16	(England) Eddie Rigg	22
17	(England) Dick Bradley	21
18	(New Zealand) Geoff Mardon	21
19	(England) Billy Hole	21
20	(England) Bill Kitchen	20
21	(England) Len Williams	20
22	(England) John Reason	19
23	(England) Bob Oakley	19
24	(New Zealand) Bruce Abernethy	19
25	(England) Eric Boothroyd	18
26	(England) Derick Close	17
27	(Australia) Graham Warren	17
28	(Wales) Tom Oakley	17
29	(England) Dennis Gray	17
30	(Canada) Eric Chitty	17
31	(England) Fred Curtis	16
32	(England) Bruce Semmens	16
33	(England) Vic Emms	16
34	(England) Arthur Forrest	16
35	(England) Eric French	15
36	(Sweden) Olle Nygren	15

Pos.	Rider	Total pts
37	(England) Ron Mountford	15
38	(England) Frank Lawrence	15
39	(England) Wally Green	14
40	(England) Malcolm Craven	13
41	(South Africa) Henry Long	13
42	(England) Len Read	13
43	(England) Ken Adams	13
44	(New Zealand) Trevor Redmond	12
45	(England) Dent Oliver	12
46	(England) Peter Robinson	12
47	(England) Tommy Price	12
48	(England) Tommy Miller	12
49	(England) Jack Mountford	12
50	(England) Phil Clarke	12
51	(England) Ken Sharples	11
52	(Australia) Noel Watson	10
53	(England) Roy Craighead	10
54	(England) Wilf Jay	9
55	(England) Bill Kemp	9
56	(England) Cyril Roger	9
57	(England) George Smith	9
58	(England) Harry Saunders	9
59	(Scotland) Gordon McGregor	9
60	(England) Chris Boss	9
61	(England) Jimmy Squibb	6
62	(England) Harry Edwards	6
63	(England) Son Mitchell	6
64	(England) Fred Brand	6
65	(England) Bob Baker	6
66	(England) Ron Peace	5
67	(England) Eric Salmon	4
68	(England) Geoff Pymar	4
69	(England) Frank Hodgson	3
70	(Australia) Junior Bainbridge	2
71	(England) Jack Hodgson	1
72	(Australia) Merv Harding	0

== World final ==
- 20 September 1951
- (England) London, Wembley Stadium

Pos.	Rider	Points	Heats
1	(Australia) Jack Young	12+3	(2,2,3,3,2)
2	(England) Split Waterman	12+2	(1,3,3,2,3)
3	(Australia) Jack Biggs	12+1	(3,3,3,3,0)
4	(New Zealand) Ronnie Moore	11	(2,2,2,2,3)
5	(England) Jack Parker	10	(0,1,3,3,3)
6	(England) Louis Lawson	10	(2,0,2,3,3)
7	(England) Eddie Rigg	8	(3,3,1,1,0)
8	(Australia) Bob Leverenz	7	(3,2,1,0,1)
9	(Wales) Freddie Williams	7	(3,1,0,2,1)
10	(Australia) Aub Lawson	7	(1,2,2,0,2)
11	(England) Jeff Lloyd	6	(1,3,1,0,1)
12	(Wales) Eric Williams	6	(0,1,1,2,2)
13	(England) Cyril Brine	3	(1,E,2,0,0)
14	(England) Norman Parker	3	(0,1,1,1,0)
15	(United States) Ernie Roccio	2	(2,0,0,0,-)
16	(England) Alan Hunt	2	(F,F,0,1,1)
	(England) Dick Bradley (res)	2	(2)
	(New Zealand) Geoff Mardon (res)	–	–

=== Classification ===
Placing	Rider	Total	1	2	3	4	5	6	7	8	9	10	11	12	13	14	15	16	17	18	19	20	Pts	Pos
1	(Australia) (2) Jack Young	12+3	2					2				3				3				2			12	1
2	(England) (3) Split Waterman	12+2	1						3				3				2				3		12	2
3	(Australia) (13) Jack Biggs	12+1				3	3							3		3					0		12	3
4	(New Zealand) (15) Ronnie Moore	11				2			2			2						2	3				11	4
5	(England) (5) Jack Parker	10		0			1					3					3					3	10	5
6	(England) (9) Louis Lawson	10			2		0						2					3		3			10	6
7	(England) (4) Eddie Rigg	8	3							3				1				1				0	8	7
8	(Australia) (8) Bob Leverenz	7		3						2			1			0			1				7	8
9	(Wales) (12) Freddie Williams	7			3					1		0			2						1		7	9
10	(Australia) (6) Aub Lawson	7		1				2			2							0			2		7	10
11	(England) (14) Jeff Lloyd	6				1		3					1		0							1	6	11
12	(Wales) (11) Eric Williams	6			0				1		1					2						2	6	12
13	(England) (10) Cyril Brine	3			1			0						2			0		0				3	13
14	(England) (1) Norman Parker	3	0				1				1				1				0				3	14
15	(United States) (7) Ernie Roccio	2		2					0					0	0					-			2	15
16	(England) (16) Alan Hunt	2				-				-	0						1			1			2	16
	(England) (17) Dick Bradley	2																		2			2	
	(New Zealand) (18) Geoff Mardon	0																					0	
Placing	Rider	Total	1	2	3	4	5	6	7	8	9	10	11	12	13	14	15	16	17	18	19	20	Pts	Pos

m - exclusion for exceeding two minute time allowance • t - exclusion for touching the tapes • x - other exclusion • e - retired or mechanical failure • f - fell • ns - non-starter • nc - non-classify

gate A - inside	gate B	gate C	gate D - outside

=== Podium ===
1951 Podium:

1. (gold) Jack Young (Australia)
2. (silver) (England) Split Waterman (Great Britain)
3. (bronze) Jack Biggs (Australia)
