= 1949 Individual Speedway World Championship =

Fourth edition of the World motorcycle speedway championship

Seasons
- ← 1939 1950 →

The 1949 Individual Speedway World Championship was the fourth edition of the official World Championship to determine the world champion rider.

It was the first running of the event since its suspension in 1939, due to World War II. The World final at London's Wembley Stadium, was held in front of a reported 93,000 strong crowd and the Championship was won Tommy Price.

== First qualifying round ==
- The top 96 riders qualify for the second qualifying round, where they will be joined by seeded division 2 riders.

Date	Venue	Winner
16 May	County Ground Stadium	Jack Mountford
18 May	The Shay	Vic Emms
18 May	The Pilot Field	Paddy Mills
18 May	Tamworth Greyhound Stadium	Basse Hveem
19 May	Pennycross Stadium	Bruce Semmens
19 May	Owlerton Stadium	Andy Menzies
20 May	Leicester Stadium	Charlie May
21 May	Sun Street Stadium	Stan Williams
21 May	Hedon Stadium	Billy Hole
21 May	Rayleigh Weir Stadium	Alan Hunt / Will Lowther

== Second qualifying round ==
- The top 42 riders qualify for the Third qualifying round.

Date	Venue	Winner
10 June	Dudley Wood Stadium	Gil Craven
11 June	Brandon Stadium	Ken Le Breton
11 June	Old Meadowbank	Jack Young
11 June	The Firs Stadium	Bob Leverenz
13 June	Knowle Stadium	Fred Tuck
13 June	Walthamstow Stadium	Jim Boyd

== Third qualifying round ==
- The top 2 riders from each meeting qualify for the Championship round, where they will meet 32 seeded division 1 riders.

Date	Venue	Winner/2nd
4 July	Brough Park Stadium	Tommy Price / Ray Duggan
5 July	Ashfield Stadium	Ken Le Breton / Freddie Williams
5 July	Banister Court Stadium	Fred Tuck / Roy Craighead
6 July	Highbury Stadium (Fleetwood)	Charles Cullum / Ken Sharples
6 July	White City Stadium, Glasgow	Geoff Bennett / Gil Craven

== Championship round ==
- The top 16 riders qualify for the world final.

Date	Venue	Winner
8 August	Wimbledon Stadium	Aub Lawson
10 August	New Cross Stadium	Cyril Roger
22 August	Perry Barr Stadium	Graham Warren
25 August	Wembley Stadium	Wilbur Lamoreaux
27 August	Hyde Road Stadium	Dent Oliver
27 August	Odsal Stadium	Tommy Price
30 August	West Ham Stadium	Cliff Watson
2 September	Harringay Stadium	Dent Oliver

=== Scores ===
- Top 16 qualify for World final, 17th & 18th reserves for World final

Pos.	Rider	Total pts
1	(England) Tommy Price	38
2	(Australia) Graham Warren	38
3	(England) Dent Oliver	37
4	(Australia) Aub Lawson	37
5	(England) Bill Gilbert	36
6	(United States) Wilbur Lamoreaux	35
7	(England) Lloyd Goffe	34
8	(England) Jack Parker	34
9	(England) Bill Kitchen	33
10	(England) Cyril Roger	31
11	(England) Louis Lawson	30
12	(Australia) Bill Longley	30
13	(Australia) Norman Parker	30
14	(Australia) Ken Le Breton	29
15	(Australia) Cliff Watson	29
16	(England) Ron Clarke	27
17	(England) Oliver Hart	27
18	(England) Alec Statham	25
19	(England) Cyril Brine	25

Pos.	Rider	Total pts
20	(England) Malcolm Craven	25
21	(England) Geoff Pymar	23
22	(Australia) Doug McLachlan	23
23	(England) Geoff Bennett	20
24	(England) Jeff Lloyd	18
25	(England) Mike Erskine	18
26	(Australia) Ray Duggan	17
27	(United States) Charles Cullum	17
28	(Canada) Eric Chitty	15
29	(England) Split Waterman	15
30	(England) George Wilks	15
31	(England) Eddie Rigg	14
32	(England) Ken Sharples	14
33	(England) Roy Craighead	13
34	(England) Nobby Stock	13
35	(England) Gil Craven	12
36	(Australia) Jack Biggs	11
37	(England) Bob Harrison	9
38	(England) Stan Dell	2

== World final ==
- 22 September 1949
- (England) Wembley Stadium, London

Pos.	Rider	Points	Heats
1	(England) Tommy Price	15	(3,3,3,3,3)
2	(England) Jack Parker	14	(3,3,3,2,3)
3	(England) Louis Lawson	13	(2,2,3,3,3)
4	(England) Norman Parker	10	(3,3,2,2,0)
5	(United States) Wilbur Lamoreaux	9	(2,2,3,0,2)
6	(England) Bill Kitchen	9	(3,1,2,2,1)
7	(England) Ron Clarke	8	(1,0,2,3,2)
8	(Australia) Aub Lawson	8	(1,3,1,1,2)
9	(Australia) Bill Longley	8	(1,2,2,1,2)
10	(England) Cyril Roger	7	(2,0,1,1,3)
11	(England) Bill Gilbert	6	(2,1,3,0,0)
12	(Australia) Graham Warren	5	(0,2,0,2,1)
13	(Australia) Ken Le Breton	4	(1,0,1,1,1)
14	(England) Lloyd Goffe	2	(0,1,0,0,1)
15	(Australia) Cliff Watson	1	(0,1,0,0,0)
16	(England) Dent Oliver	0	(0,0,-,-,-)
	(England) Oliver Hart (res)	1	(1,0,0)
	(England) Alec Statham (res)	–	–
