= Bill Gilbert (speedway rider) =

British motorcycle speedway rider

- Born: 7 December 1916; London
- Died: April 1992 (aged 75); Bexley, London
- Nationality: British (English)

Career history
- 1946-1950: Wembley Lions
- 1952: Norwich Stars

Individual honours
- 1949: Speedway World Championship finalist

Team honours
- 1946, 1947, 1949, 1950: National League Champion
- 1948: National Trophy Winner
- 1946, 1948, 1949, 1950: London Cup
- 1947: British Speedway Cup Winner

William Charles Gilbert (7 December 1916 – April 1992) was a motorcycle speedway rider from England. He earned six international caps for the England national speedway team.

== Speedway career ==
Gilbert was a leading speedway rider in the late 1940s. He reached the final of the Speedway World Championship in the 1949 Individual Speedway World Championship.

Gilbert rode in the top tier of British Speedway, riding for Wembley Lions. He initially retired from speedway in 1951, but did return in 1952 for the Norwich Stars.

== World Final appearances ==
- 1949 - (England) London, Wembley Stadium - 11th - 6pts
