= Bill Kitchen (speedway rider) =

English speedway rider (1908–1994)

- Born: 7 December 1908; Galgate, England
- Died: May 1994 (aged 85); High Wycombe, England
- Nationality: British (English)

Career history
- 1933–1939: Belle Vue Aces
- 1946–1954: Wembley Lions

Individual honours
- 1940: Northern Riders' Champion
- 1950: Australian Champion

Team honours
- 1933, 1934, 1935, 1936, 1946, 1947, 1949, 1950, 1951, 1952, 1953: National League Champion
- 1933, 1934, 1935, 1936, 1937, 1948: National Trophy winner
- 1934, 1935, 1936, 1937: A.C.U. Cup winner
- 1939, 1947: British Speedway Cup winner
- 1946, 1948, 1949, 1950, 1951: London Cup winner

Bill Kitchen
Motorcycle racing career statistics
Isle of Man TT career
TTs contested	4 (1930–1933)
TT wins	0
TT podiums	0

William Kitchen (7 December 1908 in Galgate, Lancashire, England – May 1994) was an international speedway rider who started his career with the Belle Vue Aces in 1933. He earned 41 international caps for the England national speedway team.

== Career summary ==
Before he started speedway racing, Kitchen was a prominent road trials rider and had taken part in the Isle of Man TT.

Kitchen's pre-war career was with Belle Vue.

After the war, Kitchen rode in various meeting during late 1945 before becoming the captain of the Wembley Lions in 1946 and finished second in the British Speedway Championship. He finished fifth in the Speedway World Championship in 1938.

Kitchen was a member of a National League winning team eleven times in twenty years, a feat made even more exceptional given the fact that the outbreak of World War II cost his Belle Vue team the chance of earning Kitchen a twelfth title (the Aces were top of the league when it was abandoned), and the fact that the competition was suspended a further six seasons during the war.

Kitchen was a regular England international with 41 appearances for the national team. In 1950, he won the Australian 3 Lap Championship at the Tracey's Speedway in Melbourne.

After retirement, Kitchen ran a motor spares shop bearing his own name, in Station Road Harrow until at least the 1980s.

== World Final appearances ==
- 1937 - (England) London, Wembley Stadium - 8th - 9pts + 7 semi-final points
- 1938 - (England) London, Wembley Stadium - 5th - 9pts + 6 semi-final points
- 1949 - (England) London, Wembley Stadium - 6th - 9pts

== Players cigarette cards ==
Kitchen is listed as number 24 of 50 in the 1930s Player's cigarette card collection.
