= Harringay Speedway =

British speedway team

Club information
- Track address: Harringay Stadium; Green Lanes; Harringay; London
- Country: England
- Founded: 1929
- Closed: 1954
- League: Southern League; National League

Club facts
- Colours: Blue and Yellow

Major team honours
| London Cup winners | 1935, 1952, 1953 |
| National Trophy winners | 1952 |
| Anniversary Cup Winners | 1948 |
| Coronation Cup Winners | 1953 |

Harringay Speedway was a motorcycle speedway team who raced at the Harringay Stadium from 1929 until 1954.

== History ==
=== Origins and 1920s ===
The Harringay Canaries logo

Harringay Stadium was the third greyhound racing stadium to open in Britain following the immediate success of the sport. It was owned by the Greyhound Racing Association (GRA). The stadium was constructed by Messrs T.G. Simpson of Victoria Street, London, at a cost of £35,000 and opened in 1927. The following year speedway was introduced to Britain from Australia and speedway events were held at Green Lanes (the name given when speedway was held) throughout 1928, the first being on 29 May 1928. The GRA associated itself with International Speedways Ltd, which brought the speedway to several stadiums including Harringay.

A team was formed for the 1929 season that would become known as the Harringay Canaries. After a challenge match against Birmingham Hall Green on 20 April, the first Southern League fixture took place against Lea Bridge on 4 May. In their inaugural season the Canaries finished 8th in the 1929 Speedway Southern League.

=== 1930s ===
The Harringay Tigers logo

The following season the Canaries slipped to 12th place in the 1930 Speedway Southern League despite having the Australian and world star Vic Huxley as number one rider. The following season, the team resigned in early June, citing lack of support, with their fixtures eventually being taken over by Belle Vue Aces.

A dispute between Lea Bridge Speedway and Motor Speedways Limited led to the return of speedway to Harringay for the 1934 Speedway National League season. The Parker brothers, Jack and Norman starred but were unable to help the Tigers finish any higher than 6th that season. However, with the arrival of Jack Ormston in 1935, the Tigers finished runner-up to Belle Vue in the 1935 Speedway National League. The team also secured their first silverware by winning the London Cup.

Three solid seasons ensued from 1936 to 1938 before racing ceased because of World War II, the Tigers were in 5th position at the time.

=== 1940s ===
The stadium reopened in 1946 but speedway did not return until 1947. The first fixture was held on 4 April 1947 and the team was revived under the new name Harringay Racers. Australian brothers Vic Duggan and Ray Duggan were signed and Vic was the leading rider in the league during 1947, averaging a remarkable 11.54.

The 1948 Speedway National League season saw the Racers win the Anniversary Cup and finish runner-up to New Cross Rangers in the league campaign.

=== 1950s ===
The decade started with the worst news possible when Ray Duggan was killed on 20 January at the Sydney Sports Ground after being involved in a high-speed crash with friend Norman Clay. Clay also died from his injuries. His brother Vic Duggan continued to stand out as one of the world's best riders but a lack of support resulted in the Racers being rooted to the bottom of the league in 1950 before Duggan left British speedway at the end of the season. Harringay rebuilt for 1951 after signing Olle Nygren to support Split Waterman, signed from Wembley in 1950, and Jack Biggs, back with the Racers after a spell at Bradford. During the 1952 Speedway National League season the team became the National Trophy and London Cup winners.

The following year in 1953 saw another successful season as the Racers retained their London Cup title won the Coronation Cup competition and only lost the league title by one point to Wembley Lions. The subsequent season in 1954 failed to live up to the success experienced in 1953 and to make matters worse in January 1955 it was announced that league speedway would end.

Green Lanes never held league speedway again although the stadium was used for one-off meetings in 1958, 1960 and 1961.

== Notable riders ==
- (Australia) Frank Arthur
- (Australia) Jack Biggs
- (England) Billy Dallison
- (Australia) Ray Duggan
- (Australia) Vic Duggan
- (England) Danny Dunton
- (England) Ron How
- (Australia) Vic Huxley
- (England) Lloyd Goffe
- (England) Jeff Lloyd
- (Sweden) Olle Nygren
- (England) Jack Ormston
- (England) Jack Parker
- (England) Norman Parker
- (England) Cliff Parkinson
- (England) Bill Pitcher
- (England) Alec Statham
- (England) Split Waterman

== Season summary ==
| Year and league | Position | Notes |
|---|---|---|
| 1929 Speedway Southern League | 8th | as Harringay Canaries |
| 1930 Speedway Southern League | 12th | |
| 1931 Speedway Southern League | 8th+ | + resigned and fixtures taken over by Belle Vue Aces |
| 1934 Speedway National League | 6th | as Harringay Tigers |
| 1935 Speedway National League | 2nd | London Cup winners |
| 1936 Speedway National League | 3rd | |
| 1937 Speedway National League | 6th | |
| 1938 Speedway National League | 6th | |
| 1939 Speedway National League | 5th+ | +league was suspended |
| 1947 Speedway National League | 7th | as Harringay Racers |
| 1948 Speedway National League | 2nd | Anniversary Cup winners |
| 1949 Speedway National League | 6th | |
| 1950 Speedway National League | 9th | |
| 1951 Speedway National League | 7th | |
| 1952 Speedway National League | 3rd | National Trophy & London Cup winners |
| 1953 Speedway National League | 2nd | London Cup & Coronation Cup winners |
| 1954 Speedway National League | 6th | |
