= New Cross Rangers =

British motorcycle speedway team that existed from 1934 to 1953

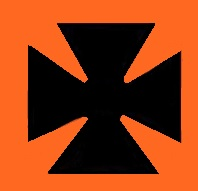

Club information
- Track address: New Cross Stadium; Hornshay Street; Old Kent Road; London
- Country: England
- Founded: 1934
- Closed: 1963

Club facts
- Colours: Orange and black
- Track size: 262 yards (240 m) (1934-53) 278 yards (254 m) (1959-63)

Major team honours
National League Champions	1938, 1948
London Cup Winners	1934, 1937, 1947

The New Cross Rangers were a motorcycle speedway team which operated from 1934 until their closure in 1953. They also rode as the New Cross Lambs from 1934 to 1935 and then the New Cross Tamers in 1936. The team were League Champions in 1938 and 1948.

== History ==
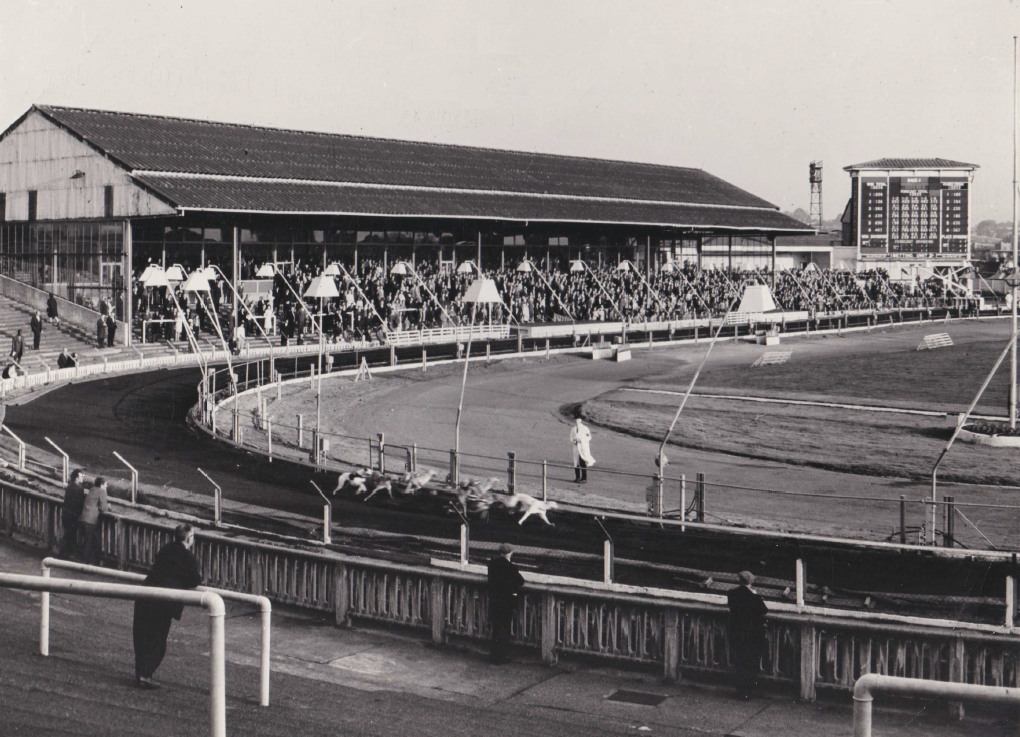
The speedway track can be seen on the inside of the greyhound track circa.1950

=== 1930s ===
In 1933, the new New Cross Stadium was designed by Mr. G. Simpson and built by Robert McAlpine & Sons and cost New Cross Greyhounds Ltd £100,000 to build. A speedway track soon followed in early 1934, with promoter Fred Mockford relocating his Crystal Palace team at the end of the 1933 season. The New Cross club colours were a black Maltese cross on a burnt orange background. The significance of the cross was purely down to the 'Cross' in the team's name. The colours were brought with the team from Crystal Palace when promoter Fred Mockford transferred the whole operation. The official speedway track length was 262 yards from 1934 until 1953,

Originally known as the New Cross Lambs, the team finished third in their inaugural season during the 1934 Speedway National League, with one of the early stars of speedway Tom Farndon impressing and the team won the London Cup. However, the following season Farndon was killed after crashing at the stadium, which sent shockwaves around the speedway world.

New Cross became the Tamers for the 1936 season and the team finished third in the league during the 1937 Speedway National League season and won the London Cup, a year which also saw New Cross Rangers rider Jack Milne from the United States win the second ever Speedway World Championship. Milne was received strong support in the New Cross team from the likes of George Newton Ron Johnson and Stan Greatrex.

The following season during the 1938 Speedway National League season, the team (now called the Rangers) became league champions before World War II interrupted speedway for several years.

=== 1940s ===
Speedway did not return to as a league format until the 1946 season and the Rangers were one of the six teams that formed the National league that season. Ron Johnson remained from the pre–war team and was joined by new faces such as Eric French and Geoff Pymar. In 1947, Jeff Lloyd was signed and Bill Longley returned, which helped the Rangers win their third London Cup title.

By the start of 1948, George Newton has also returned along with another signing Cyril Roger. The Rangers had compiled a strong team and they duly won the league for the second time in their history.

A solid season during 1949 also saw New Cross Stadium used as a film set for some of the action and crowd scenes for the 1949 film "Once a Jolly Swagman" which starred Dirk Bogarde.

=== 1950s ===
Two of the Rogers' brothers Cyril and Bert headed the team's averages in 1950 and two seasons of mediocrity ensued in 1951 and 1952. Part way through the 1953 season the club folded because MD Fred Mockford stated attendances were down to 5,000 and racing was being staged at a loss.

When the track reopened in 1959 the official speedway track length was 278 yards. The speedway was under teh direction of promoter Johnnie Hoskins for a series of open meetings.

=== 1960s ===
The Rangers returned for the 1960 Speedway National League and Hoskins persuaded Split Waterman and Eric Williams to come out of retirement but the star signing was double world champion Barry Briggs. However, the team lacked depth and finished eighth in 1960 and 1961.

The team closed at the end of the 1961 season before reopening again under Pete Lansdale and Wally Mawdsley in the Provincial League in 1963, but had to close down before completing the season. The track was often referred to as 'The Frying Pan'. It was built inside the greyhound track and had banking all the way round.

== Season summary ==
Extended content

Year and league	Position	Notes
1934 Speedway National League	3rd	Lambs
1935 Speedway National League	6th	Lambs
1936 Speedway National League	6th	Tamers
1937 Speedway National League	3rd	
1938 Speedway National League	1st	champions
1939 Speedway National League	7th+	+when league suspended
1946 Speedway National League	5th	
1947 Speedway National League	5th	
1948 Speedway National League	1st	champions
1949 Speedway National League	3rd	
1950 Speedway National League	4th	
1951 Speedway National League	8th	
1952 Speedway National League	7th	
1953 Speedway National League	N/A	withdrew, results expunged
1960 Speedway National League	8th	
1961 Speedway National League	8th	
1963 Provincial Speedway League	N/A	withdrew, results expunged

== Notable riders ==
- (New Zealand) Barry Briggs
- (England) Tom Farndon
- (England) Joe Francis
- (England) Eric French
- (England) Stan Greatrex
- (Australia) Ron Johnson
- (England) Frank Lawrence
- (England) Jeff Lloyd
- (Australia) Bill Longley
- (England) Nobby Key
- (United States) Jack Milne
- (England) George Newton
- (England) Geoff Pymar
- (England) Cyril Roger
- (England) Bert Roger
- (England) Harry Shepherd
- (England) Split Waterman
- (Wales) Eric Williams
- (Australia) Lionel Van Praag
