= Keith Milner =

British motorcycle speedway rider

- Born: 5 September 1935 (age 91); Huddersfield, West Yorkshire, England
- Nationality: British (English)

Career history
- 1952–1955: Bradford Tudors

Keith Milner (born 5 September 1935) is a former international motorcycle speedway rider from England. He earned one international cap for the England national speedway team.

== Biography ==
Milner, born in Huddersfield, began riding in 1950 as a 14-year-old, appearing in the second half practice, following on from matches at Odsal Stadium. The following season when he turned sixteen, he began racing in the second half novice races and worked as a solicitor's clerk.

Milner made his long-awaited British leagues debut riding for Bradford Tudors during the 1952 Speedway National League and continued to ride for them until the end of the 1955 season.

During his time at Bradford, Milner averaged around the six point mark. While undergoing National Service he continued to ride but suffered two serious injuries in quick succession in 1955, the first was a head injury followed by a compound fracture of the leg. He decided that the sport was too dangerous and retired aged just 20.
