= London Cup (speedway) =

British motorcycle speedway competition

- Sport: Speedway
- Founded: 1930
- Folded: 1989
- Country: United Kingdom

The London Cup was a motorcycle speedway competition held in the United Kingdom from 1930 to 1989, that was restricted to teams from the London area.

The competition was a significant competition at the time, due to the speedway teams from London also being the majority of the leading teams in the country. However, following the increased closure of the London tracks the event diminished in stature, particularly from 1964 onwards, when only a few teams competed and in some cases just two. The competition ended after 1989, replaced by an event called the Pride of London.

== London Cup ==
Season	Champions	Runner-Up	Ref
1930	Wembley	Stamford Bridge	
1931	Crystal Palace	Wembley	
1932	Wembley	Stamford Bridge	
1933	Wembley	Wimbledon	
1934	New Cross	West Ham	
1935	Harringay	West Ham	
1936	Hackney Wick	Harringay	
1937	New Cross	West Ham	
1938	Wimbledon	New Cross	
1939	Wimbledon	New Cross	
1940–1945 not held due to World War II
1946	Wembley	Wimbledon	
1947	New Cross	Wembley	
1948	Wembley	New Cross	
1949	Wembley	West Ham	
1950	Wembley	Wimbledon	
1951	Wembley	Harringay	
1952	Harringay	Wimbledon	
1953	Harringay	West Ham	
1954	Wembley	Wimbledon	
1955–1963 not held
1964	Wimbledon	West Ham	
1965	West Ham	Wimbledon	
1966	West Ham	Wimbledon	
1967	West Ham	Wimbledon	
1968	Wimbledon	Hackney	
1969	Wimbledon	Hackney	
1970	Wimbledon	Hackney	
1971	Hackney	West Ham	
1973	Hackney	Wimbledon	
1974	Wimbledon	Hackney	
1975	Wimbledon	Hackney	
1977	White City	Wimbledon	
1978	Wimbledon	Hackney	
1979	Hackney	Wimbledon	
1980	Wimbledon	Hackney	
1981	Hackney	Wimbledon	
1983	Wimbledon	Hackney	
1985	Wimbledon	Hackney	
1986	Hackney	Wimbledon	
1989	Hackney	Wimbledon	
