= National League (1932–1964) =

Defunct English speedway league

- Formerly: replaced the Northern League and Southern League
- Sport: Speedway
- Founded: 1932
- Folded: 1964
- Replaced by: the British League
- Country: United Kingdom
- Most titles: Wembley Lions (8)

The National League was the main speedway league in the United Kingdom from 1932 until 1964, after which it merged with the Provincial League to form the British League. Prior to 1932 there were only small regional leagues competing within the sport in the UK, with the Northern League and the Southern League merging for the inaugural 1932 season.

== History ==
Initially a single division, in 1936 a second division was created, initially named the Provincial League, but becoming National League Division Two in 1938. When league racing resumed after World War II, there was initially a single division. Six clubs started a new grass roots Northern League that year, and with more tracks opening up, the National League expanded to three divisions in 1947. For several reasons, including the levels of Entertainment tax and competition for audiences from television, a number of teams ceased to be profitable and the league reverted to two divisions in 1954. Further withdrawals led to a reduction to a single eleven-team division in 1957.

Continuing reduction in spectator numbers, and dissatisfaction with the way speedway was structured and managed led several promoters (including Mike Parker, Reg Fearman, and Johnnie Hoskins) to create the breakaway Provincial League in 1960. Working within tighter budgets, they were nevertheless more successful commercially than the National League promotions. After relations between the two leagues broke down in 1963, an RAC commission led to the two leagues merging in 1965 to form the British League.

The National League name was revived in 1975 when the British League Division Two was renamed, initially to the New National League. The name was reused again for the third tier of British speedway from 2009.

== Champions ==
Season	Champions	Second
1932	Wembley Lions	Crystal Palace Glaziers
1933	Belle Vue Aces	Wimbledon Dons
1934	Belle Vue Aces	Wembley Lions
1935	Belle Vue Aces	Harringay Tigers
1936	Belle Vue Aces	Wembley Lions
1937	West Ham Hammers	Wembley Lions
1938	New Cross Rangers	West Ham Hammers
not held during Second World War
1946	Wembley Lions	Belle Vue Aces
1947	Wembley Lions	Belle Vue Aces
1948	New Cross Rangers	Harringay Racers
1949	Wembley Lions	Belle Vue Aces
1950	Wembley Lions	Belle Vue Aces
1951	Wembley Lions	Belle Vue Aces
1952	Wembley Lions	Birmingham Brummies
1953	Wembley Lions	Harringay Racers
1954	Wimbledon Dons	Wembley Lions
1955	Wimbledon Dons	Belle Vue Aces
1956	Wimbledon Dons	Wembley Lions
1957	Swindon Robins	Belle Vue Aces
1958	Wimbledon Dons	Norwich Stars
1959	Wimbledon Dons	Leicester Hunters
1960	Wimbledon Dons	Belle Vue Aces
1961	Wimbledon Dons	Southampton Saints
1962	Southampton Saints	Wimbledon Dons
1963	Belle Vue Aces	Norwich Stars
1964	Oxford Cheetahs	Coventry Bees

== See also ==
- List of United Kingdom Speedway League Champions
