= Henry Long (speedway rider) =

South African speedway rider (1927–2019)

- Born: 26 July 1927; Alberton, Johannesburg, South Africa
- Died: 8 July 2019 (aged 91); Franschhoek, Western Cape, South Africa
- Nationality: South African

Career history
- 1948: Sheffield Tigers
- 1949–1952: Belle Vue Aces

Individual honours
- 1952: Speedway World Championship finalist

Henry Long (26 July 1927 – 8 July 2019) was an international speedway rider from South Africa. He earned 33 caps for the South African national speedway team.

== Speedway career ==
Long was a leading speedway rider in the 1950s. He reached the final of the Speedway World Championship in 1952.

Long rode in the top tier of British Speedway, riding for Sheffield Tigers in 1948 and Belle Vue Aces from 1949 to 1952.

== World final appearances ==
=== Individual World Championship ===
- 1952 - (England) London, Wembley Stadium - 10th - 7pts
