= Lloyd Goffe =

British motorcycle speedway rider

- Born: 30 January 1913; Reading England
- Died: 18 October 1984 (aged 71); Reading, England
- Nationality: British (English)

Career history
- 1937-1938, 1950-1951: West Ham Hammers/Hawks
- 1937: Leicester Hounds
- 1938-1939, 1948-1950: Harringay Tigers/Racers
- 1938: Lea Bridge Cubs
- 1946-1947: Wimbledon Dons
- 1951-1952: Odsal Tudors
- 1952: St Austell Gulls

Team honours
- 1948: Anniversary Cup Winner

Kenneth Lloyd Goffe (30 January 1913 – 18 October 1984) was a British motorcycle speedway rider. He earned one international cap for the England national speedway team.

== Career ==
Goffe began his racing career in 1934 at the sand track in the resort of California near Wokingham, riding for prize money. He then concentrated on grasstrack racing, winning the South of England Grass Track Championship at Basingstoke in 1936. He bought a 500cc Rudge bike from "Froggy" French in 1936, which he used in his early speedway rides, impressing sufficiently to receive offers from both Hackney Wick Wolves and the Johnny Hoskins-managed West Ham Hammers, signing for the latter in 1937. He had a brief spell with the Leicester Hounds team, riding in three matches in 1937 before the club withdrew from the Provincial League.

Goffe's performances progressed after transferring to the Harringay Tigers later that season, staying with the team until the outbreak of World War II. During the war, he served as a fitter in the Royal Air Force.

After the end of the war, Goffe joined the Wimbledon Dons in 1946. His riding style led to him being nicknamed "Cowboy". He achieved one of his ambitions in 1946 by beating the Wembley captain Bill Kitchen in a race. In 1948 Goffe rejoined Harringay (now the 'Racers') for a £1,350 transfer fee, where he won the Anniversary Cup in 1949 and by 1950 his career completed a full circle when he rejoined West Ham.

In 1951, Goffe signed and rode for Odsal Tudors and started the 1952 season there before he joined the St Austell Gulls.

== World Final Appearances ==
- 1949 – (England) London, Wembley Stadium – 14th – 2pts
