= Cliff Watson (speedway rider) =

Australian speedway rider (1916–1989)

- Born: 28 August 1916; Christchurch, New Zealand
- Died: 23 April 1989 (aged 72)
- Nationality: Australian

Career history
- 1947-1950, 1952-1953: West Ham Hammers
- 1950–1951: Harringay Racers

Clifford Grant Watson (28 August 1916 – 23 April 1989) was a New Zealand born Australian international motorcycle speedway rider, who qualified for the Speedway World Championship final in 1949.

== Career summary ==
Watson was born in Christchurch, New Zealand, but moved to Australia and represented the Australian national team at test level.

Watson joined the West Ham Hammers in 1947, progressing to heat leader status in 1949 and qualifying for the World final the same year. In 1950, after a poor start to the season with West Ham he joined the Harringay Racers and remained with them until the end of the following season. He rejoined the Hammers in 1952 but after a poor start to the 1953 season he decided to retire and return to Australia.

== World Final appearances ==
- 1949 - (England) London, Wembley Stadium - 15th - 1pt
