= Ron Clarke (speedway rider) =

English motorcycle speedway rider

- Born: 26 March 1914; Oxford, England
- Died: 12 June 1981 (aged 67)
- Nationality: British (English)

Career history
- 1938: Lea Bridge
- 1939: Crystal Palace Glaziers
- 1946-1957: Odsal Boomerangs/Bradford Tudors

Sidney Ronald Clarke (born 26 March 1914 in Oxford, England - 12 June 1981 ) was a former international speedway who qualified for the Speedway World Championship finals twice.

== Career ==
Clarke started his career in British leagues with Lea Bridge during the 1938 Speedway National League Division Two season. The following season, he joined the Crystal Palace Glaziers but the team withdrew from the league mid-season, shortly before the outbreak of World War II.

In 1944, Clarke was deemed to be the British champion after winning an event advertised as the British Championship but many riders were not involved because of the war.

In 1946 after the war, Clarke joined Odsal Boomerangs of Bradford and would spend the rest of his career with Bradford.

Clarke qualified for two World finals in succession in 1949 and 1950 and at retirement he had earned nine international caps for the England national speedway team.

== World final appearances ==
- 1949 - (England) London, Wembley Stadium - 7th - 8pts
- 1950 - (England) London, Wembley Stadium - 14th - 3pts
