= Jack Parker (speedway rider) =

British motorcycle speedway rider (1905–1989)

- Born: 9 October 1905; Birmingham, England
- Died: 31 December 1989 (aged 84); Birmingham, England
- Nationality: British (English)

Career history
- 1929-1930: Coventry
- 1931-1932: Southampton Saints
- 1932-1933: Clapton Saints
- 1934-1939: Harringay Tigers
- 1946-1954: Belle Vue Aces

Individual honours
- 1934: Star Riders' Champion
- 1932: Dirt Track Championnat du Monde
- 1947: British Riders' Champion
- 1951, 1952: New South Wales State Champion

Team honours
- 1946, 1947, 1949: National Trophy winner
- 1946: National League Cup winner
- 1935: London Cup winner

John (Jack) Parker (1905 – 1989) was an international motorcycle speedway rider who made his debut at the Whitsun meeting at High Beech in 1928. He won the British Riders' Championship in 1949 and finished second in the 1949 World Championship. He earned 89 international caps for the England national speedway team.

== Biography ==
Parker was born in Birmingham, England, on 9 October 1905. His early employment was in the experimental department of BSA, where his talent for racing became apparent. He represented the company in road races, including the Isle of Man TT. He took part in some of the earliest dirt-track races at High Beech, initially riding a stripped-down road bike, but later a specially adapted BSA.

Parker joined the Coventry team in 1929 at the stadium at Lythalls Lane, Foleshill, becoming the team captain, and switching to a Douglas bike. His brother Norman also rode in the Coventry team in 1930. He joined Southampton in 1931, and successfully challenged Vic Huxley for the title of British Individual Champion. Also in 1931, he captained England for the first time and set a new British Mile Record. In 1932, the new National League began. The team relocated mid-season to Lea Bridge (becoming Clapton Saints), and Parker captained England in three test matches that year. He won the Dirt Track Championnat du Monde (an early version of the Speedway World Championship and rival of the Star Riders' Championship) at Stade Buffalo in Paris during 1932.

After good early season form in 1933, Parker broke a leg in a crash towards the end of the season, but still topped the rider averages in 1933. The team relocated to Harringay where he was re-united with his brother Norman.

After the war, Parker spent much of his career with the Belle Vue Aces. He won the British Riders' Championship, and captained England in 1947. He was also match race champion on and off from 1946 to 1947, holding the title through 1948, 1949 and most of 1950, only losing the title at the end of the 1950 season to Aub Lawson. He took the title back in 1951, eventually losing it to Split Waterman.

Parker was a regular visitor to Australia during his career, where he raced at venues such as the Sydney Showground Speedway, Sydney Sports Ground, the Wayville Showground in Adelaide, Perth's Claremont Speedway, and the Brisbane Exhibition Ground. He won the 1938 Australian Championship at the Camden Motordrome in Adelaide, defeating Cordy Milne and Frank Woodroofe in the 5 lap final. He also won the 1950/51 and 1951/52 New South Wales State Championships at the Sydney Sports Ground and Sydney Showground respectively. During his time in Australia, Parker was also a regular captain of the England team in test matches against the Australians (who included such riders as Lionel Van Praag, Bluey Wilkinson, Jack Young, Aub Lawson and Vic Duggan).

Parker was involved in a car crash in Australia during the 1951/52 season which left him seriously injured, and he never regained his top form. He retired from active speedway racing in 1954.

Parker died in December 1989 at the age of 84.

== World Final Appearances ==
Parker qualified for the first World Championship final in 1936, but missed it due to injury. His best finish was second place in 1949.

- 1936 - (England) London, Wembley Stadium - 14th - 12 semi-final points
- 1937 - (England) London, Wembley Stadium - 4th - 10pts + 11 semi-final points
- 1938 - (England) London, Wembley Stadium - 10th - 6pts + 4 semi-final points
- 1949 - (England) London, Wembley Stadium - 2nd - 14pts
- 1950 - (England) London, Wembley Stadium - 6th - 8pts
- 1951 - (England) London, Wembley Stadium - 5th - 10pts

== Players cigarette cards ==
Parker is listed as number 35 of 50 in the 1930s Player's cigarette card collection.
