= Louis Lawson =

British speedway rider

- Born: 25 October 1921; Southwell, Nottinghamshire, England
- Died: 5 July 2009 (aged 87)
- Nationality: British (English)

Career history
- 1946-1953: Belle Vue Aces

Team honours
- 1946, 1947, 1949: National Trophy Winner

Louis Lawson (25 October 1921 – 5 July 2009) was international motorcycle speedway rider who finished third in the 1949 Speedway World Championship final. He earned seven international caps for the England national speedway team.

== Career ==
Lawson was born in Southwell, Nottinghamshire, and spent his whole career with the Belle Vue Aces, winning the National Trophy three times. Lawson also featured in the England team.

== World Final Appearances ==
- 1949 - (England) London, Wembley Stadium - 3rd - 13pts
- 1951 - (England) London, Wembley Stadium - 6th - 10pts
- 1953 - (England) London, Wembley Stadium - Res - Did not ride
