= 1954 Speedway National League =

20th season of speedway in the United Kingdom

- League: National League
- No. of competitors: 8
- Champions: Wimbledon Dons
- National Trophy: Wembley Lions
- R.A.C. Cup: Wimbledon Dons
- London Cup: Wembley Lions
- Midland Cup: Birmingham Brummies
- Highest average: Ronnie Moore
- Division/s below: National League (Div 2); 1954 Southern Area League

The 1954 National League Division One was the 20th season of speedway in the United Kingdom and the ninth post-war season of the highest tier of speedway.

== Summary ==
Bristol dropped out of the league and joined the National League Division Two. Wimbledon won their first National League Championship, beginning a run of 7 titles in 8 years, ending a similar run by Wembley Lions.

== Final table ==
Pos	Team	PL	W	D	L	Pts
1	Wimbledon Dons	28	21	2	5	44
2	Wembley Lions	28	20	0	8	40
3	Bradford Tudors	28	15	0	13	30
4	Norwich Stars	27	14	0	13	28
5	West Ham Hammers	28	11	1	16	23
6	Harringay Racers	28	10	1	17	21
7	Belle Vue Aces	27	9	0	18	18
8	Birmingham Brummies	28	9	0	19	18

== Fixtures & results ==
=== A fixtures ===
Home \ Away	BV	BIR	BRA	HAR	NOR	WEM	WH	WIM
Belle Vue		46–38	41–53	47–37	37–47	37–46	37–47	47–37
Birmingham	45–39		44–40	59–25	43–41	31–52	46–38	36–48
Bradford	52–32	55–29		41–43	54–30	45–39	53–31	58–26
Harringay	48–35	41–43	48–36		56–28	27–57	47–37	37–46
Norwich	55–29	52–32	58–26	50–34		33–51	40–44	41–43
Wembley	67–17	65–19	53–31	45–39	50–34		54–30	33–51
West Ham	52–32	54–30	49–35	52–31	29–55	46–38		42–42
Wimbledon	60–24	61–23	62–22	48–36	57–26	43–40	53–31	

Legend: Blue = home team win; Yellow = draw; Red = away team win.

=== B fixtures ===
Home \ Away	BV	BIR	BRA	HAR	NOR	WEM	WH	WIM
Belle Vue		59–24	50–34	57–27	39–45	25–59	50–33	43–41
Birmingham	38–44		40–44	57–27	43–41	32–52	43–41	35–49
Bradford	46–38	65–19		53–31	47–37	52–32	58–26	45–39
Harringay	53–31	50–33	46–38		39–45	30–54	48–36	32–52
Norwich	n/a	63–21	44–40	49–35		47–37	53–31	49–35
Wembley	50–34	64–20	51–33	53–31	44–40		49–35	36–48
West Ham	48–36	48–35	44–40	40–44	45–39	32–51		41–43
Wimbledon	62–22	65–19	49–35	42–42	61–23	43–41	54–29	

Legend: Blue = home team win; Yellow = draw; Red = away team win.

== Top ten riders (league only) ==
	Rider	Nat	Team	C.M.A.
1	Ronnie Moore	(New Zealand)	Wimbledon	10.59
2	Jack Young	(Australia)	West Ham	10.55
3	Geoff Mardon	(New Zealand)	Wimbledon	10.43
4	Eddie Rigg	(England)	Bradford	10.11
5	Arthur Forrest	(England)	Bradford	10.00
6	Brian Crutcher	(England)	Wembley	9.98
7	Eric Williams	(Wales)	Wembley	9.79
8	Barry Briggs	(New Zealand)	Wimbledon	9.39
9	Freddie Williams	(Wales)	Wembley	9.18
10	Split Waterman	(England)	Harringay	9.07

== R.A.C. Cup ==
Wembley played all of their fixtures away.

Group A

Team	PL	W	D	L	Pts
West Ham	6	5	1	0	11
Birmingham	6	2	1	3	5
Wembley	6	2	0	4	4
Norwich	12	6	0	6	12

Group B

Team	PL	W	D	L	Pts
Wimbledon	6	4	0	2	8
Belle Vue	6	3	0	3	6
Bradford/Odsal	6	3	0	3	6
Harringay	6	2	0	4	4

Group A

Home \ Away	BIR	NOR	WEM	WH
Birmingham		41–42	44–40	42–42
Norwich	35–49		37–46	33–51
Wembley	46–38	36–47		35–48
West Ham	50–34	60–24	48–36	

Legend: Blue = home team win; Yellow = draw; Red = away team win.

Group B

Home \ Away	BV	BRA	HAR	WIM
Belle Vue		50–34	49–35	50–34
Bradford	49–34		53–31	48–36
Harringay	53–30	59–25		31–51
Wimbledon	59–25	56–28	50–34	

Legend: Blue = home team win; Yellow = draw; Red = away team win.

Final

Team one	Team two	Scores
West Ham	Wimbledon	41–43, 26–58

== National Trophy ==
The 1954 National Trophy was the 17th edition of the Knockout Cup.

Qualifying first round

Date	Team one	Score	Team two
01/05	Edinburgh	60-48	Leicester
01/05	Rayleigh	65-43	Motherwell
30/04	Bristol	59-49	Oxford
30/04	Leicester	59-48	Edinburgh
30/04	Motherwell	64-44	Rayleigh
29/04	Ipswich	71-35	Southampton
29/04	Oxford	40-68	Bristol
29/04	Plymouth	45-63	Poole
27/04	Southampton	72-36	Ipswich
26/04	Exeter	59-49	Swindon
26/04	Poole	69-38	Plymouth
24/04	Swindon	65-43	Exeter
11/05 replay	Southampton	62-46	Ipswich
06/05 replay	Ipswich	56-52	Southampton

Qualifying second round

Date	Team one	Score	Team two
25/05	Southampton	61-47	Coventry
22/05	Coventry	64-44	Southampton
22/05	Edinburgh	65-43	Rayleigh
22/05	Swindon	69-39	Wolverhampton
21/05	Bristol	61-47	Poole
21/05	Rayleigh	55-52	Edinburgh
21/05	Swindon	w/o	Wolverhampton
17/05	Poole	63-45	Bristol

Qualifying Final Round

Date	Team one	Score	Team two
14/06	Poole	67-41	Swindon
12/06	Edinburgh	50-57	Coventry
12/06	Swindon	53-55	Poole
05/06	Coventry	56-52	Edinburgh

First round

Date	Team one	Score	Team two
05/07	Coventry	41-66	Bradford Odsal
03/07	Belle Vue	71-37	Poole
03/07	Bradford Odsal	84-24	Coventry
28/06	Poole	46-62	Belle Vue

Quarterfinals

Date	Team one	Score	Team two
24/07	Belle Vue	61-47	Wimbledon
22/07	Wembley	70-37	West Ham
21/07	Harringay	54-54	Bradford Odsal
20/07	West Ham	50-58	Wembley
19/07	Wimbledon	76-32	Belle Vue
17/07	Bradford Odsal	78-30	Harringay
10/07	Birmingham	62-46	Norwich
08/07	Norwich	74-34	Birmingham

Semifinals

Date	Team one	Score	Team two
28/08	Bradford Odsal	63-45	Wembley
28/08	Norwich	64-44	Wimbledon
23/08	Wimbledon	51-57	Norwich
05/08	Wembley	63-44	Bradford Odsal

=== Final ===
First leg

9 September 1954

Wembley Lions Brian Crutcher 15 Eric Williams 12 Tommy Price 10 Freddie Williams 8 Fred Lang 7 Trevor Redmond 5 Eric French 4 Jimmy Gooch 0	61 – 46	Norwich Stars Fred Brand 10 Cyril Roger 8 Aub Lawson 7 Bob Oakley 7 Fred Rogers 5 Phil Clarke 4 Merv Neil 3 Billy Bales 2

Wembley Stadium

Second leg

11 September 1954

Norwich Stars Merv Neil 14 Aub Lawson 11 Bob Oakley 8 Phil Clarke 6 Fred Rogers 4 Billy Bales 2 Cyril Roger 1 Fred Brand 0	46 – 62	Wembley Lions Brian Crutcher 14 Trevor Redmond 12 Freddie Williams 10 Eric Williams 8 Tommy Price 6 Fred Lang 6 Eric French 5 Jimmy Gooch 1

The Firs Stadium

Wembley were National Trophy Champions, winning on aggregate 123–92.

== London Cup ==
First round

Team one	Score	Team two
Wimbledon	61–46, 56–52	Wembley

Semi final round

Team one	Score	Team two
Harringay	44–63, 48–60	Wembley
Wimbledon	69–38, 53–55	West Ham

=== Final ===
First leg

19 August 1954

Wembley Freddie Williams 17 Tommy Price 12 Eric Williams 12 Brian Crutcher 10 Trevor Redmond 8 Eric French 6 Fred Lang 3 Jimmy Gooch 1	69–38	Wimbledon Peter Moore 11 Ronnie Moore 11 Geoff Mardon 4 Cyril Maidment 4 Don Perry 3 Reg Trott 3 Barry Briggs 2 Cyril Brine 0

Wembley Stadium

Second leg

30 August 1954

Wimbledon Geoff Mardon 13 Ronnie Moore 8 Peter Moore 7 Barry Briggs 6 Cyril Brine 6 Cyril Maidment 5 Reg Trott 1 Bill Longley 1	47–61	Wembley Brian Crutcher 18 Eric Williams 15 Freddie Williams 8 Eric French 8 Jimmy Gooch 5 Trevor Redmond 5 Tommy Price 2 Fred Lang 0

Plough Lane

Wembley won on aggregate 130–85

== Midland Cup ==
Birmingham won the Midland Cup, which consisted of four teams. There was one team from division 1 and three teams from division 2.

First round

Team one	Team two	Score
Oxford	Leicester	56–28, 47–49

Semi final round

Team one	Team two	Score
Oxford	Coventry	61–35, 34–62

Final first leg

9 October 1954

Birmingham Ron Mountford 12 Alan Hunt 11 Doug Davies 11 Hec Mayhead 7 Jim Tolley 6 Eric Boothroyd 6 Harry Bastable 2 Vic Hall 0	55–40	Coventry Charlie New 11 Tommy Miller 9 Jim Lightfoot 5 Johnnie Reason 4 Reg Duval 4 Derrick Tailby 4 Vic Emms 2 Bob Mark 1

Perry Barr Stadium

Final second leg

16 October 1954

Coventry Charlie New 11 Tommy Miller 9 Bob Mark 8 Johnnie Reason 7 Les Tolley 7 Derrick Tailby 6 Vic Emms 6 Jim Lightfoot 1	55–41	Birmingham Alan Hunt 12 Doug Davies 11 Jim Tolley 6 Eric Boothroyd 6 Vic Hall 3 Harry Bastable 1 Alan Pearce 1 Cyril Page 1

Brandon Stadium

Birmingham won on aggregate 96–95

== Riders and final averages ==
Belle Vue

- (England) Peter Craven 8.47
- (New Zealand) Ron Johnston 8.41
- (Sweden) Rune Sörmander 7.60
- (England) Ken Sharples 7.27
- (England) Harry Edwards 5.66
- (England) Don Cuppleditch 5.20
- (England) Jack Parker 4.58
- (New Zealand) Bob Duckworth 4.25
- (England) Dick Fisher 3.93
- (Scotland) Willie Wilson 3.28
- (England) Bob Fletcher 2.86
- (England) Peter Williams 1.71

Birmingham

- (England) Alan Hunt 8.68
- (England) Ron Mountford 7.39
- (England) Eric Boothroyd 6.54
- (Australia) Arthur Payne 5.60
- (England) Jim Tolley 5.14
- (England) Ivor Davies 3.72
- (England) Les Jenkins 3.69
- (South Africa) Doug Davies 3.68
- (New Zealand) Hec Mayhead 3.33
- (England) Harry Bastable 3.04
- (England) Ron Barrett 1.84
- (England) Dennis Bennett 1.43

Bradford

- (England) Eddie Rigg 10.11
- (England) Arthur Forrest 10.00
- (England) Arthur Wright 8.83
- (England) Ron Clarke 5.76
- (England) Keith Milner 5.70
- (England) Dent Oliver 5.43
- (England) Al Allison 5.08
- (Australia) Dick Seers 3.71
- (England) Guy Allott 3.11
- (England) Wal Morton 2.00

Harringay

- (England) Split Waterman 9.07
- (Australia) Jack Biggs 7.42
- (England) Ron How 7.20
- (Australia) Ken Walsh 5.43
- (England) Danny Dunton 5.17
- (England) Frank Lawrence 4.98
- (Australia) Allan Quinn 4.82
- (England) Alf Hagon 4.79
- (England) Jeff Lloyd 4.73

Norwich

- (England) Billy Bales 6.90
- (Australia) Aub Lawson 8.87
- (England) Fred Rogers 7.58
- (England) Cyril Roger 7.81
- (England) Bob Oakley 6.52
- (England) Phil Clarke 6.51
- (New Zealand) Merv Neil 6.46
- (England) Fred Brand 6.48
- (England) Roy Craighead 5.20
- (England) Fred Pawson 3.43
- (England) Barry East 2.55

Wembley

- (England) Brian Crutcher 9.98
- (Wales) Eric Williams 9.79
- (Wales) Freddie Williams 9.18
- (New Zealand) Trevor Redmond 7.93
- (England) Tommy Price 7.02
- (England) Jimmy Gooch 6.29
- (Republic of Ireland) Eric French 6.26
- (South Africa) Fred Lang 3.66
- (England) George Wilks 2.67

West Ham

- (Australia) Jack Young 10.55
- (England) Gerry Hussey 8.16
- (England) Wally Green 7.35
- (England) Bert Roger 5.64
- (England) Howdy Byford 5.32
- (England) Pat Clark 5.03
- (England) Alan Smith 4.70
- (England) Malcolm Craven 4.77
- (Australia) Keith Gurtner 4.26
- (England) Terry Courtnell 3.17

Wimbledon

- (New Zealand) Ronnie Moore 10.59
- (New Zealand) Geoff Mardon 10.43
- (New Zealand) Barry Briggs 9.39
- (Sweden) Olle Nygren 9.00
- (Australia) Peter Moore 7.08
- (Republic of Ireland) Dom Perry 6.64
- (England) Cyril Brine 6.47
- (Australia) Bill Longley 6.09
- (England) Cyril Maidment 5.87
- (England) Reg Trott 4.68

== See also ==
- List of United Kingdom Speedway League Champions
- Knockout Cup (speedway)
