= 1956 Speedway National League =

British motorcycle speedway season

- League: National League
- No. of competitors: 7
- Champions: Wimbledon Dons
- National Trophy: Wimbledon Dons
- Highest average: Barry Briggs
- Division/s below: National League (Div 2); 1956 Southern Area League

The 1956 National League Division One was the 22nd season and eleventh post-war season of the highest tier of motorcycle speedway in Great Britain.

== Summary ==
The league consisted of seven teams after the West Ham Hammers ceased competitive speedway racing at the end of 1955. Poole Pirates came up from the second tier to replace them. Match line-ups were increased to eight riders after a single season with seven riders. Wimbledon won their third successive National League Championship.

Norwich Stars rider Malcolm Flood died on 2 April, at Poole. The 25-year-old rider suffered fatal injuries despite an earlier warning from the race steward that he was riding too erratically into the bends.

== Final table ==
Pos	Team	PL	W	D	L	Pts
1	Wimbledon Dons	24	17	1	6	35
2	Wembley Lions	24	14	1	9	29
3	Birmingham Brummies	24	12	1	11	25
4	Norwich Stars	24	10	4	10	24
5	Belle Vue Aces	24	11	1	12	23
6	Poole Pirates	24	9	2	13	20
7	Bradford Tudors	24	6	0	18	12

== Fixtures & results ==
=== A fixtures ===
Home \ Away	BV	BIR	BRA	NOR	PP	WEM	WIM
Belle Vue		45–39	42–39	42–42	57–27	54–30	47–36
Birmingham	45–39		48–35	48–36	61–23	33–50	42–42
Bradford	50–33	43–41		37–47	55–28	32–52	33–51
Norwich	53–30	27–57	50–34		42–42	42–42	37–47
Poole	49–32	54–30	55–29	43–41		55–29	48–36
Wembley	61–23	50–33	57–27	48–35	45–39		38–46
Wimbledon	49–35	51–32	56–28	64–20	51–33	48–36	

Legend: Blue = home team win; Yellow = draw; Red = away team win.

=== B fixtures ===
Home \ Away	BV	BIR	BRA	NOR	PP	WEM	WIM
Belle Vue		60–23	55–29	44–40	53–31	37–47	36–47
Birmingham	44–40		51–33	41–43	51–33	50–32	56–28
Bradford	39–45	41–43		46–38	43–41	35–49	43–41
Norwich	39–44	50–34	60–24		56–28	52–32	43–41
Poole	46–38	40–44	53–31	42–42		55–29	41–43
Wembley	54–30	46–38	63–20	41–43	51–32		44–40
Wimbledon	53–30	61–23	50–34	51–33	50–34	49–35	

Legend: Blue = home team win; Yellow = draw; Red = away team win.

== Top Ten Riders (League only) ==
	Rider	Nat	Team	C.M.A.
1	Barry Briggs	(New Zealand)	Wimbledon	10.53
2	Ove Fundin	(Sweden)	Norwich	10.34
3	Ronnie Moore	(New Zealand)	Wimbledon	10.32
4	Brian Crutcher	(England)	Wembley	10.16
5	Alan Hunt	(England)	Birmingham	9.53
6	Peter Moore	(Australia)	Wimbledon	9.20
7	Peter Craven	(England)	Belle Vue	9.07
8	Jack Biggs	(Australia)	Poole	8.71
9	Dick Fisher	(England)	Belle Vue	8.40
10	Ron Johnston	(New Zealand)	Belle Vue	8.38

== National Trophy Stage Two ==
The 1956 National Trophy was the 19th edition of the Knockout Cup. The Trophy consisted of two stages; stage one was for the second-tier clubs, stage two was for the top-tier clubs. Wimbledon won the second and final stage and were therefore declared the 1956 National Trophy champions.

- For Stage One - see Stage One

=== First round ===
Date	Team one	Score	Team two
26/07	Wembley	60-47	Birmingham
24/07	Southampton	64-44	Norwich
21/07	Belle Vue	72-36	Poole
21/07	Birmingham	61-47	Wembley
21/07	Bradford Odsal	38-70	Wimbledon
21/07	Norwich	77-31	Southampton
16/07	Poole	54-54	Belle Vue
16/07	Wimbledon	79-29	Bradford Odsal

=== Semifinals ===
Date	Team one	Score	Team two
01/09	Belle Vue	83-25	Birmingham
17/08	Birmingham	64-44	Belle Vue
13/08	Wimbledon	68-40	Norwich
04/08	Norwich	56-52	Wimbledon

=== Final ===
First leg

8 September 1956

Belle Vue Aces Peter Craven 17 Dick Fisher 17 Peter Williams 9 Bob Duckworth 8 Ron Johnston 6 Ken Sharples 5 Tink Maynard 3 Brian Craven 3	68 – 39	Wimbledon Dons Peter Moore 10 Ronnie Moore 8 Barry Briggs 8 Ron How 4 Cyril Maidment 4 Alf Hagon 3 Bob Andrews 3 Cyril Brine 0

Hyde Road Stadium

Second leg

10 September 1956

Wimbledon Dons Ronnie Moore 16 Peter Moore 14 Barry Briggs 11 Cyril Maidment 9 Cyril Brine 9 Ron How 6 Alf Hagon 3 Bob Andrews 1	69 – 39	Belle Vue Aces Peter Craven 12 Ron Johnston 8 Alf Webster 5 Peter Williams 4 Bob Duckworth 3 Ken Sharples 3 Brian Craven 3 Dick Fisher 1

Wimbledon Stadium

Wimbledon were National Trophy Champions, winning on aggregate 108–107.

== Riders & final averages ==
Belle Vue

- (England) Peter Craven 9.07
- (New Zealand) Ron Johnston 8.38
- (England) Dick Fisher 8.40
- (New Zealand) Bob Duckworth 7.39
- (England) Ken Sharples 6.74
- (England) Brian Craven 6.29
- (England) Alf Webster 5.48
- (England) Slant Payling 5.47
- (England) Tink Maynard 5.26
- (England) Peter Williams 3.90
- (England) Fred Rogers 4.13
- (England) Frank Johnson 3.60

Birmingham

- (England) Alan Hunt 9.53
- (South Africa) Doug Davies 8.22
- (England) Eric Boothroyd 7.74
- (England) Ron Mountford 7.48
- (England) Jim Tolley 5.16
- (South Africa) Neil Mortimer 5.15
- (England) Harry Bastable 4.63
- (South Africa) Arthur Duncan 3.90
- (England) Derrick Tailby 2.89

Bradford

- (England) Arthur Forrest 7.64
- (England) Nigel Boocock 6.31
- (England) Arthur Wright 5.98
- (England) Guy Allott 5.68
- (England) Eddie Rigg 5.60
- (England) Jimmy Gooch 5.49
- (England) Ron Clarke 4.96
- (England) Des Haswell 4.90
- (England) Al Allison 4.00
- (England) Dent Oliver 3.06

Norwich

- (Sweden) Ove Fundin 10.34
- (Australia) Aub Lawson 7.83
- (England) Gerry Hussey 7.60
- (England) Phil Clarke 6.43
- (England) Billy Bales 6.30
- (England) Harry Edwards 5.91
- (England) Geoff Pymar 5.78
- (England) Reg Trott 5.03
- (England) Fred Brand 4.88
- (England) Peter Atkins 4.36
- (England) Derek Strutt 1.50

Poole

- (Australia) Jack Biggs 8.71
- (England) Cyril Roger 7.76
- (England) Ken Middleditch 7.60
- (Australia) Jack Geran 6.00
- (England) Jimmy Squibb 5.95
- (England) Bill Holden 5.33
- (England) Terry Small 5.31
- (England) Alan Kidd 5.05
- (England) Bert Roger 4.67
- (England) Norman Strachan 3.83

Wembley

- (England) Brian Crutcher 10.16
- (England) Tommy Price 7.54
- (Republic of Ireland) Eric French 7.43
- (England) Split Waterman 7.36
- (England) Jimmy Gooch 6.86
- (England) Mike Broadbank 6.43
- (New Zealand) Trevor Redmond 6.29
- (Australia) Ray Cresp 5.88
- (Wales) Freddie Williams 5.14
- (England) Merv Hannam 2.67

Wimbledon

- (New Zealand) Barry Briggs 10.53
- (New Zealand) Ronnie Moore 10.32
- (Australia) Peter Moore 9.20
- (England) Ron How 7.88
- (England) Cyril Brine 6.47
- (England) Bob Andrews 5.38
- (England) Alf Hagon 4.94
- (England) Gil Goldfinch 2.56

== See also ==
- List of United Kingdom Speedway League Champions
- Knockout Cup (speedway)
