= 1955 Speedway National League =

21st British motorcycle speedway season

- League: National League
- No. of competitors: 7
- Champions: Wimbledon Dons
- National Trophy: Norwich Stars
- Midland Cup: Birmingham Brummies
- Highest average: Jack Young
- Division/s below: National League (Div 2); 1955 Southern Area League

The 1955 Speedway National League was the 21st season and tenth post-war season of the highest tier of motorcycle speedway in Great Britain.

== Summary ==
The league consisted of seven teams after the Harringay Racers ceased competitive speedway racing at the end of 1954. Match line-ups were reduced from eight riders to seven riders. Wimbledon won their second successive National League Championship. West Ham closed at the end of the season, blaming poor attendances.

== Final table ==
Pos	Team	PL	W	D	L	Pts
1	Wimbledon Dons	24	16	2	6	34
2	Belle Vue Aces	24	15	0	9	30
3	Wembley Lions	24	11	1	12	23
4	Bradford Tudors	24	11	0	13	22
5	Birmingham Brummies	24	9	2	13	20
6	Norwich Stars	24	9	1	14	19
7	West Ham Hammers	24	8	2	14	18

== Fixtures & results ==
=== A fixtures ===
Home \ Away	BV	BIR	BRA	NOR	WEM	WH	WIM
Belle Vue		64–32	55–41	55–41	57–39	51–44	49–47
Birmingham	53–43		52–44	51–45	50–45	64–32	43–53
Bradford	61–35	62–34		68–28	46–50	56–39	51–45
Norwich	47–49	62–34	61–35		46–50	54–42	42–54
Wembley	66–30	68–28	61–35	66–30		50–46	49–47
West Ham	47–49	48–48	59–37	50–46	46–50		42–54
Wimbledon	72–24	73–22	59–37	70–26	49–46	63–33	

Legend: Blue = home team win; Yellow = draw; Red = away team win.

=== B fixtures ===
Home \ Away	BV	BIR	BRA	NOR	WEM	WH	WIM
Belle Vue		71–25	63–33	51–45	53–43	62–34	55–41
Birmingham	50–46		47–49	50–43	55–41	46–50	48–48
Bradford	63–33	52–44		47–49	55–41	51–45	52–44
Norwich	41–55	64–32	60–34		51–45	53–43	48–48
Wembley	38–57*	43–53*	41–45*	54–42*		46–50*	46–49*
West Ham	62–34	50–45	60–36	37–59	48–48		47–49
Wimbledon	50–45	67–28	56–40	53–43	51–45	44–52	

Legend: Blue = home team win; Yellow = draw; Red = away team win.
- Wembley Lions were forced to hold one set of their home fixtures at the away team's venue due to the ongoing installation of floodlights at Wembley Stadium from May.

== Top Ten Riders (League only) ==
	Rider	Nat	Team	C.M.A.
1	Jack Young	(Australia)	West Ham	10.79
2	Ronnie Moore	(New Zealand)	Wimbledon	10.77
3	Ove Fundin	(Sweden)	Norwich	10.00
4	Barry Briggs	(New Zealand)	Wimbledon	9.79
5	Brian Crutcher	(England)	Wembley	9.34
6	Arthur Wright	(England)	Bradford	9.14
7	Peter Craven	(England)	Belle Vue	8.96
8	Arthur Forrest	(England)	Bradford	8.91
9	Ron Johnston	(New Zealand)	Belle Vue	8.61
10	Ken Sharples	(England)	Belle Vue	8.43

== National Trophy Stage Two ==
The 1955 National Trophy was the 18th edition of the Knockout Cup. The Trophy consisted of two stages; stage one was for the second-tier clubs, stage two was for the top-tier clubs. Norwich won the second and final stage and were therefore declared the 1955 National Trophy champions.

- For Stage One - see Stage One

First round

Date	Team one	Score	Team two
04/08	Poole	56-52	Birmingham
16/07	Birmingham	56-52	Poole
16/07	Belle Vue	61-47	Wembley
16/07	Bradford Odsal	52-56	Wimbledon
16/07	Norwich	69-39	West Ham
14/07	Wembley	67-41	Belle Vue
12/07	West Ham	49-58	Norwich
11/07	Wimbledon	76-31	Bradford Odsal
18/08 replay	Poole	69-39	Birmingham
17/08 replay	Birmingham	67-41	Poole

Semifinals

Date	Team one	Score	Team two
29/08	Poole	58-50	Norwich
27/08	Norwich	82-26	Poole
15/08	Wimbledon	61-47	Wembley
04/08	Wembley	63-45	Wimbledon

=== Final ===
First leg

8 September 1955

Wembley Lions Brian Crutcher 15 Eric Williams 9 Freddie Williams 6 Ken Adams 4 Jimmy Gooch 4 Tommy Price 3 Trevor Redmond 2 Eric French 0	43 – 64	Norwich Stars Ove Fundin 16 Cyril Roger 11 Aub Lawson 10 Billy Bales 10 Harry Edwards 6 Phil Clarke 6 Fred Brand 4 Don Lawson 1

Wembley Stadium

Second leg

17 September 1955

Norwich Stars Phil Clarke 15 Cyril Roger 9 Fred Brand 6 Harry Edwards 4 Reg Trott (guest) 5 Billy Bales 3 Don Lawson 2 Malcolm Flood 1	45 – 63	Wembley Lions Tommy Price 13 Brian Crutcher 11 Trevor Redmond 11 Eric French 8 Jimmy Gooch 8 Freddie Williams 5 Ken Adams 4 Eric Williams 3

The Firs Stadium

Norwich were National Trophy Champions, winning on aggregate 109–106.

== Midland Cup ==
Birmingham won the Midland Cup for a third consecutive year. It consisted of four teams, there was one team from division 1 and three teams from division 2.

First round

Team one	Team two	Score
Oxford	Leicester	49–53, 29–73

Semi final round

Team one	Team two	Score
Leicester	Coventry	66–36, 51–51

=== Final ===
First leg

17 September 1955

Birmingham Ron Mountford 15 Alan Hunt 13 Eric Boothroyd 13 Jim Tolley 12 Dennis Newton 6 Harry Bastable 6 Derrick Tailby 1	66–36	Leicester Ken McKinlay 16 Len Williams 8 Charlie Barsby 4 Ron Phillips 4 Barry East 2 Derek Close 1 Gordon McGregor 1

Perry Barr Stadium

Second leg

30 September 1955

Leicester Ken McKinlay 18 Len Williams 12 Gordon McGregor 12 Ron Phillips 6 Fred Brand 5 Barry East 4 Charlie Barsby 3	60–42	Birmingham Junior Bainbridge 14 Jim Tolley 6 Alan Hunt 6 Eric Boothroyd 6 Harry Bastable 5 Dennis Newton 2 Derrick Tailby 3

Leicester Stadium

Birmingham won on aggregate 108–96

== Riders & final averages ==
Belle Vue

- (England) Peter Craven 8.96
- (New Zealand) Ron Johnston 8.61
- (England) Ken Sharples 8.43
- (New Zealand) Bob Duckworth 6.69
- (England) Harry Edwards 5.05
- (England) Peter Williams 4.93
- (England) Fred Rogers 4.76
- (England) Dick Fisher 4.70
- (England) Tink Maynard 4.47
- (England) Don Cuppleditch 4.45
- (England) Frank Johnson 1.60

Birmingham

- (England) Alan Hunt 7.94
- (England) Ron Mountford 7.87
- (South Africa) Doug Davies 7.08
- (Australia) Graham Warren 5.31
- (England) Eric Boothroyd 5.21
- (England) Harry Bastable 5.11
- (England) Jim Tolley 4.35
- (England) Derrick Tailby 2.77

Bradford

- (England) Arthur Wright 9.14
- (England) Arthur Forrest 8.91
- (England) Eddie Rigg 7.85
- (England) Guy Allott 6.18
- (England) Keith Milner 6.04
- (England) Des Haswell 5.04
- (England) Al Allison 4.28
- (England) Ron Clarke 3.57
- (England) Jack Hughes 3.27
- (England) Nigel Boocock 2.24

Norwich

- (Sweden) Ove Fundin 10.00
- (England) Billy Bales 8.33
- (Australia) Aub Lawson 7.38
- (England) Phil Clarke 7.32
- (England) Cyril Roger 6.51
- (England) Harry Edwards 4.80
- (England) Fred Brand 4.58
- (Australia) Don Lawson 2.49
- (England) Malcolm Flood 1.52

Wembley

- (England) Brian Crutcher 9.34
- (England) Tommy Price 7.31
- (Wales) Eric Williams 6.95
- (Wales) Freddie Williams 6.91
- (New Zealand) Trevor Redmond 6.13
- (Republic of Ireland) Eric French 5.88
- (England) Ken Adams 4.35
- (England) Jimmy Gooch 4.00

West Ham

- (Australia) Jack Young 10.79
- (England) Split Waterman 7.46
- (England) Gerry Hussey 6.87
- (England) Bert Roger 5.79
- (England) Alan Smith 5.51
- (England) Wally Green 5.44
- (Australia) Jack Biggs 4.93
- (Guernsey) Johnny Fitzpatrick 2.15
- (England) Terry Courtnell 1.73
- (England) Howdy Byford 0.73

Wimbledon

- (New Zealand) Ronnie Moore 10.77
- (New Zealand) Barry Briggs 9.79
- (Australia) Peter Moore 7.76
- (England) Ron How 7.63
- (England) Cyril Maidment 5.54
- (England) Les McGillivray 5.33
- (England) Cyril Brine 5.16
- (England) Alf Hagon 4.98
- (England) Reg Trott 1.14

== See also ==
- List of United Kingdom Speedway League Champions
- Knockout Cup (speedway)
