= 1955 Individual Speedway World Championship =

10th edition of the World motorcycle speedway championship

Seasons
- ← 1954 1956 →

The 1955 Individual Speedway World Championship was the tenth edition of the official World Championship to determine the world champion rider.

In a very competitive World final Peter Craven of England finished one point ahead of three other riders who had to ride off for the silver medal. The defending champion Ronnie Moore won the ride off to claim silver from fellow countryman Barry Briggs and Welshman Eric Williams who both crashed leaving Moore an easy victory, Briggs took third place from Williams who missed out on a medal.

== Qualification ==
Qualification started on 29 April.

=== Stage 1 ===
==== Norwegian round ====
- 26 September 1954
- (Norway) Briskebyen Utstillingsplassen, Hamar
- Top 3 (+2 seeded) to Nordic round 1955

Pos.	Rider	Points
1	Reidar Kristoffersen	15
2	Rolf Westerberg	14
3	Nils Paulsen	13
4	Sverre Gjomesli	11
5	Rolf Solberg	9
6	Odd Johansen	8
7	Erling Simonsen	8
8	Gunnar Hilsen	7
9	Aage W. Jensen	7
10	Tore Meiner	6
11	Erling Cae	5
12	Oddvar Wold	5
13	Tor Bjorkkvist	4
14	Odd Kleiven	4
15	Knut Bjorge	2
16	Jens Georg Walle	0

==== Swedish round ====
- 29 April 1955
- (Sweden) Linköping Motorstadion (Ryd), Linköping
- Top 6 to Nordic qualification

Pos.	Rider	Points
1	Ove Fundin	15
2	Ulf Ericsson	12
3	Lars Pettersson	12
4	Kjell Carlsson	11
5	Rune Claesson	10
6	Gunnar Johansson	9
7	Olle Andersson II	8
8	Stig Pramberg	8
9	Olle Segerström	8
10	Kaj Forsberg	8
11	Göte Nordin	5
12	Thorsten Carlsson	5
13	Allan Nilsson	3
14	Rune Stenström	3
15	Bert Engman	3
16	Bertil Carlsson II	0
17	Stig Sköldberg	0

- 29 April 1955
- (Sweden) Snälltorpet, Eskilstuna
- Top 6 to Nordic qualification

Pos.	Rider	Points
1	Bert Lindarw	14
2	Göran Norlén	14
3	Birger Forsberg	13
4	Olle Andersson I	11
5	Joel Jansson	9
6	Olle Heyman	9
7	Sven Fahlén	9
8	Bernt Nilsson	9
9	Per-Tage Svensson	8
10	Bengt Nilsson	8
11	Göte Olsson	4
12	Dan Forsberg	4
13	Alf Jonsson	3
14	Evert Andersson	3
15	Sven Skoglund	2
16	Olle Broms	0
17	Sten Cederlöv	0

=== Stage 2 ===
==== Nordic round ====
- 1 May 1955
- (Finland) Turku Speedway track, Turku
- Top 8 to Nordic final

Pos.	Rider	Points
1	Ove Fundin	15
2	Ulf Ericsson	14
3	Sven Fahlén	11
4	Kaukko Jousanen	10
5	Reidar Kristoffersen	10
6	Olle Heyman	10
7	Birger Forsberg	10
8	Antti Pajari	10
9	Olle Andersson I	8
10	Reino Niemi	5
11	Rauno Aaltonen	5
12	Aulis Tuominen	4
13	Aage Hansen	3
14	Simo Ylänen	3
15	Antti Mattila	2
16	Ilkka Helminen	0

- 4 May 1955
- (Denmark) Amager Speedway Stadium, Copenhagen
- Top 8 to Nordic final

Pos.	Rider	Points
1	Göran Norlén	15
2	Joel Jansson	12
3	Lars Pettersson	11
4	Basse Hveem	10
5	Henry Andersen	10
6	Kjell Carlsson	9
7	Rune Claesson	8
8	Bert Lindarw	8
9	Kiehn Berthelsen	6
10	Leif Bech	6
11	Arne Pander	6
12	Nils Paulsen	5
13	Erling Simonsen	4
14	Eivind Petersen	4
15	Rolf Westerberg	3
16	Axel Möller	3

==== Continental round ====
- 1 May 1955
- (Socialist Federal Republic of Yugoslavia) City Garden Stadium, Osijek
- Top 8 to Continental final

Pos.	Rider	Points
1	Karel Kiendl	13
2	Fred Aberl	12
3	Sebastian Wiesent	12
4	Nicola Snjaric	11
5	Valentin Medved	11
6	Drago Regvart	10
7	Branko Regvart	9
8	Max Aebi	9
9	Josip Klemencic	8
10	Cornel Bijman	7
11	Gerhard Hofemeister	5
12	Josef Sinzinger	5
13	Alois Strasser	4
14	Moritz Künzl	2
15	Leo Petzwinkler	2
16	Jakob Dietrich	0

- 8 May 1955
- (West Germany) Niederrheinstadion, Oberhausen
- Top 8 to Continental final

Pos.	Rider	Points
1	Josef Seidl	14
2	Per-Olof Söderman	12
3	Sune Karlsson	12
4	Georg Duneborn	11
5	Josef Hofmeister	9
6	Karl Killmeyer	8
7	Marius Metzelaar	8
8	Albin Siegl	8
9	T van Gorcum	8
10	Anton Kroeze	7
11	Howdy Byford	7
12	Alan Smith	4
13	Leopold Killmeyer	3
14	J van der Sluis	3
15	Thei Bischops	2
16	Alex Jakob	1
17	Kurt Pieper	1

=== Stage 3 ===
==== Nordic Final ====
- 8 June 1955
- (Norway) Lerkendal Stadion, Trondheim
- First 6 to European final

Pos.	Rider	Points
1	(Sweden) Ove Fundin	14
2	(Norway) Henry Andersen	14
3	(Norway) Basse Hveem	12
4	(Sweden) Ulf Ericsson	10
5	(Sweden) Birger Forsberg	10
6	(Sweden) Kjell Carlsson	9
7	(Sweden) Sven Fahlén	9
8	(Sweden) Joel Jansson	8
9	(Sweden) Rune Claesson	7
10	(Sweden) Bert Lindarw	7
11	(Sweden) Olle Heyman	6
12	(Sweden) Lars Pettersson	5
13	(Norway) Reidar Kristoffersen	5
14	(Sweden) Göran Norlén	3
15	(Finland) Antti Pajari	2
16	(Finland) Kaukko Jousanen	1

==== Continental Final ====
- 13 June 1955
- (West Germany) Altes Stadion, Abensberg
- First 6 to European Final

Pos.	Rider	Points
1	(Austria) Fritz Dirtl	15
2	(Austria) Josef Kamper	12
3	(Sweden) Georg Duneborn	12
4	(West Germany) Josef Hofmeister	11
5	(West Germany) Josef Seidl	11
6	(Sweden) Per Olof Söderman	10+3
7	(Austria) Karl Killmeyer	10+2
8	(Sweden) Sune Karlsson	8
9	(Netherlands) Nicvan Gorcum	7
10	(West Germany) Fred Aberl	6
11	(West Germany) Sebastian Wiesent	6
12	(Socialist Federal Republic of Yugoslavia) Branko Regvart	4
13	(Netherlands) Tinus Metzelaar	3
14	(West Germany) Karl Kiendl	2
15	(Socialist Federal Republic of Yugoslavia) Drago Regvart	2
16	(Socialist Federal Republic of Yugoslavia) Nicola Snjaric	1

==== British & Commonwealth round ====
- Top 21 qualify for Championship round.

Date	Venue	Winner
4 July	Wimborne Road	Ken Middleditch
5 July	Banister Court Stadium	Dick Bradley
7 July	Foxhall Stadium	Junior Bainbridge
7 July	Oxford Stadium	Ronnie Genz
8 July	Leicester Stadium	Ken Middleditch
9 July	Brandon Stadium	Tommy Miller
9 July	Rayleigh Weir Stadium	Bert Roger
9 July	Abbey Stadium	Ian Williams
11 July	County Ground Stadium	Ken McKinlay

=== Stage 4 ===
==== Championship Round ====
- Top 12 qualify for World final + 2 reserves

Date	Venue	Winner
8 August	Wimbledon Stadium	Barry Briggs
9 August	West Ham Stadium	Jack Young
11 August	Wembley Stadium	Brian Crutcher
13 August	Perry Barr Stadium	Doug Davies
13 August	Odsal Stadium	Arthur Wright
20 August	Hyde Road Stadium	Peter Craven
20 August	The Firs Stadium	Aub Lawson

Scores

- First 12 to World final + 2 reserves

Pos.	Rider	Total pts
1	(England) Peter Craven	29
2	(Australia) Jack Young	29
3	(New Zealand) Barry Briggs	28
4	(New Zealand) Ron Johnston	26
5	(New Zealand) Ronnie Moore	26
6	(England) Arthur Wright	26
7	(South Africa) Doug Davies	26
8	(England) Cyril Roger	25
9	(England) Arthur Forrest	24
10	(Australia) Aub Lawson	24
11	(England) Phil Clarke	24
12	(England) Brian Crutcher	23
13	(Wales) Eric Williams	23
14	(England) Billy Bales	23
15	(England) Gerry Hussey	22
16	(Scotland) Ken McKinlay	22
17	(Wales) Freddie Williams	21
18	(England) Alf Hagon	19
19	(England) Ken Middleditch	19
20	(England) Ron Mountford	18
21	(Australia) Jack Geran	18
22	(Australia) Jack Biggs	17
23	(England) Alan Hunt	17
24	(England) Les McGillivray	17
25	(Australia) Peter Moore	15
26	(England) Ron How	14
27	(England) Harry Bastable	14
28	(New Zealand) Peter Clark	14

Pos.	Rider	Total pts
29	(England) Tommy Price	14
30	(England) Fred Rogers	14
31	(England) Dick Bradley	12
32	(Scotland) Bob Mark	11
33	(Wales) Ian Williams	11
34	(England) Split Waterman	11
35	(New Zealand) Bob Duckworth	11
36	(England) Tommy Miller	10
37	(England) Reg Reeves	10
38	(Australia) Allan Kidd	10
39	(England) Alan Smith	9
40	(England) Fred Brand	9
41	(Australia) Neil Street	9
42	(England) Guy Allott	8
43	(Australia) Junior Bainbridge	8
44	(England) Harry Edwards	7
45	(Scotland) Gordon McGregor	7
46	(England) Bob Roger	6
47	(New Zealand) Charlie New	6
48	(England) Jimmy Gooch	5
49	(England) Bill Holden	5
50	(England) Eric French	4
51	(England) Ron Clarke	3
52	(Guernsey) John Fitzpatrick	3
53	(England) Ken Sharples	1
54	(Australia) Bob Sharp	1
55	(England) Eddie Rigg	0
56	(England) Jim Lightfoot	0

==== European Final ====
- 4 July 1955
- (Norway) Bislett Stadium, Oslo
- First 4 to World final

Pos.	Rider	Total
1	(Norway) Henry Andersen	14
2	(Sweden) Olle Nygren	12
3	(Sweden) Kjell Carlsson	11
4	(Sweden) Ove Fundin	11
5	(Sweden) Per Olof Söderman	11
6	(Norway) Basse Hveem	10
7	(Austria) Josef Kamper	9
8	(Sweden) Ulf Ericsson	8
9	(Austria) Fritz Dirtl	7
10	(Sweden) Birger Forsberg	7
11	(Sweden) Georg Duneborn	6
12	(England) Alf Hagon	5
13	(Sweden) Rune Sörmander	4
14	(England) Cyril Maidment	3
15	(Austria) Josef Seidl	2
16	(West Germany) Josef Hofmeister	0
17	(Norway) Reidar Kristoffersen	0

== World final ==
- 15 September 1955
- (England) Wembley Stadium, London

Pos.	Rider	Heat Scores	Total
1	(England) Peter Craven	(3,3,2,3,2)	13
2	(New Zealand) Ronnie Moore	(3,1,3,2,3)	12+3
3	(New Zealand) Barry Briggs	(3,2,3,2,2)	12+2
4	(Wales) Eric Williams	(3,1,2,3,3)	12+1
5	(England) Brian Crutcher	(2,2,3,Fx,3)	10
6	(Sweden) Ove Fundin	(2,1,1,3,3)	10
7	(Australia) Jack Young	(1,3,1,3,2)	10
8	(Sweden) Olle Nygren	(0,3,2,2,2)	9
9	(England) Arthur Forrest	(0,2,3,1,1)	7
10	(England) Arthur Wright	(1,3,0,1,1)	6
11	(England) Billy Bales	(2,0,1,2,1)	6
12	(New Zealand) Ron Johnston	(1,1,2,1,1)	6
13	(Sweden) Kjell Carlsson	(0,2,0,1,0)	3
14	(England) Phil Clarke	(2,0,0,0,0)	2
15	(Norway) Henry Andersen	(1,0,1,0,0)	2
16	(England) Cyril Roger	(0,0,0,0,Fx)	0
R1	(England) Gerry Hussey	did not ride	-
R2	(Scotland) Ken McKinlay	did not ride	-

- Note - Aub Lawson withdrew injured, Doug Davies withdrew with meningitis,

=== Classification ===
Placing	Rider	Total	1	2	3	4	5	6	7	8	9	10	11	12	13	14	15	16	17	18	19	20	Pts	Pos
1	(England) (8) Peter Craven	13		3						3			2			3			2				13	1
2	(New Zealand) (2) Ronnie Moore	12+3	3					1				3				2				3			12	2
3	(New Zealand) (14) Barry Briggs	12+2				3		2					3		2							2	12	3
4	(Wales) (12) Eric Williams	12+1			3					1		2			3						3		12	4
5	(England) (1) Brian Crutcher	10	2				2				3				-				3				4	5
6	(Sweden) (5) Ove Fundin	10		2			1					1					3					3	10	6
7	(Australia) (9) Jack Young	10			1		3						1					3		2			10	7
8	(Sweden) (6) Olle Nygren	9		0				3			2							2			2		9	8
9	(England) (4) Arthur Forrest	7	0							2				3				1				1	7	9
10	(England) (3) Arthur Wright	6	1						3				0				1				1		6	10
11	(England) (10) Billy Bales	6			2			0						1			2		1				6	11
12	(New Zealand) (7) Ron Johnston	6		1					1					2	1					1			6	12
13	(Sweden) (11) Kjell Carlsson	3			0				2		0					1						0	3	13
14	(England) (13) Phil Clarke	2				2	0							0		0					0		2	14
15	(Norway) (16) Henry Andersen	2				1				0	1						0			0			2	15
16	(England) (15) Cyril Roger	0				0			0			0						0	-				0	16
	(England) (17) Gerry Hussey	0																					0	
	(Scotland) (18) Ken McKinlay	0																					0	
Placing	Rider	Total	1	2	3	4	5	6	7	8	9	10	11	12	13	14	15	16	17	18	19	20	Pts	Pos

m - exclusion for exceeding two minute time allowance • t - exclusion for touching the tapes • x - other exclusion • e - retired or mechanical failure • f - fell • ns - non-starter • nc - non-classify

gate A - inside	gate B	gate C	gate D - outside
