= 1953 Individual Speedway World Championship =

8th edition of the World motorcycle speedway championship

Seasons
- ← 1952 1954 →

The 1953 Individual Speedway World Championship was the eighth edition of the official World Championship to determine the world champion rider.

Welshman Freddie Williams became the second rider to win a second title in front of a 90,000 attendance at Wembley Stadium. Williams won 4 of his 5 races, only dropping one point in heat 13 to Jeff Lloyd. Geoff Mardon defeated Olle Nygren in the bronze medal ride off.

== Qualification ==
Qualification started on 1952.

=== Stage 1 ===
==== Norwegian round ====
- 28 September 1952
- (Norway) Lerkendal Stadion, Trondheim
- First 3 (+1 seeded) to Nordic round 1953

Pos.	Rider	Points
1	Basse Hveem	14+3
2	Henry Andersen	14+2
3	Reidar Kristoffersen	13
4	Sverre Gjomesli	11
5	Werner Lorentzen	10
6	Thorleif Andreassen	10
7	Erik Storm Larsen	10
8	Rolf Naess	6
9	Oddvan Gundersgaard	5
10	Edvin Fredriksen	5
11	Erling Simonsen	4
12	Odd Johansen	4
13	Magne Flaaten	3
14	Gunnar Hilsen	2
15	Karl Andreassen	1
16	Olgar Torholen	1

==== Swedish round ====
- 20 May 1953
- (Sweden) Eslöv Motorstadion, Eslöv
- First 8 to Nordic final

Pos.	Rider	Points
1	Stig Pramberg	12
2	Olle Segerström	11
3	Olle Nygren	11
4	Dan Forsberg	10
5	Rune Sörmander	10
6	Sune Karlsson	9
7	Bert Lindarw	8
8	Thorsten Carlsson	8
9	Joel Jansson	8
10	Bertil Carlsson II	7
11	Ove Fundin	6
12	Ove Bodin	4
13	Göte Olsson	4
14	Bernt Nilsson	4
15	Sven Skoglund	3
16	Evert Andersson	3
17	Gunnar Hellqvist	2

=== Stage 2 ===
==== Continental qualifier ====
- 17 May 1953
- (West Germany) Altes Stadion Abensberg, Abensberg
- First 6 to Continental round

Pos.	Rider	Points
1	(Austria) Josef Kamper	15
2	(Sweden) Kjell Carlsson	13
3	(Austria) Fritz Dirtl	12
4	(Sweden) Sven Skoglund	11
5	(Austria) Karl Killmeyer	10
6	(West Germany) Albin Siegl	9
7	(Netherlands) Tony Kroeze	9
8	(West Germany) Josef Hofmeister	8
9	(England) Wilf Plant	5
10	(West Germany) Fred Aberl	5
11	(Netherlands) Gerit Jonker	5
12	(England) Jack Winstanley	5
13	(West Germany) Karl Kiendl	4
14	(Netherlands) Co Boef	4
15	(Austria) Walter Dirtl	3
16	(Austria) Leopold Killmeyer	2
17	(West Germany) Alfred Hamberger	1
18	(West Germany) Hans Müller	0

==== Nordic Final ====
- 31 May 1953
- (Norway) Dælenenga idrettspark, Oslo
- First 8 to Continental final

Pos.	Rider	Points
1	(Sweden) Dan Forsberg	15
2	(Norway) Basse Hveem	14
3	(Sweden) Olle Nygren	11
4	(Sweden) Olle Segerström	10
5	(Norway) Henry Andersen	10
6	(Sweden) Rune Sörmander	9
7	(Sweden) Thorsten Carlsson	9
8	(Sweden) Stig Pramberg	9
9	(Sweden) Sune Karlsson	7
10	(Denmark) Leif Bech	7
11	(Norway) Reidar Kristoffersen	7
12	(Sweden) Bert Lindarw	5
13	(Norway) Thorleif Andreasen	3
14	(Sweden) Joel Jansson	3
15	(Finland) Kaukko Jousanen	1
16	(Finland) Simo Ylänen	0
17	(Denmark) Kiehn Berthelsen	0

=== Stage 3 ===
==== Continental Final ====
- 21 June 1953
- (Sweden) Kumla Motorstadion, Kumla
- First 8 to International Round

Pos.	Rider	Points
1	(Norway) Basse Hveem	15
2	(Sweden) Olle Nygren	13
3	(Sweden) Dan Forsberg	12
4	(Sweden) Sune Karlsson	12
5	(Sweden) Rune Sörmander	10
6	(Sweden) Olle Segerström	9
7	(England) Phil Clarke	9
8	(Sweden) Stig Pramberg	8
9	(Sweden) Thorsten Carlsson	7
10	(Norway) Henry Andersen	6
11	(Austria) Karl Killmeyer	6
12	(Sweden) Kjell Carlsson	4
13	(Austria) Josef Kamper	3
14	(England) Bob Roger	3
15	(Austria) Fritz Dirtl	2
16	(Sweden) Sven Skoglund	1
17	(West Germany) Albin Siegl	dnr

==== British qualifying round ====
- The top riders qualify for the International round.

Date	Venue	Winner
26 May	Banister Court Stadium	Maury Mattingley
26 May	Cornish Stadium	Goog Hoskin
28 May	Oxford Stadium	Jim Boyd
29 May	Pennycross Stadium	Harold Fairhurst
30 May	Rayleigh Weir Stadium	Peter Clark

=== Stage 4 ===
==== International round ====
- The top 54 riders qualify for the Championship round.

Date	Venue	Winner
6 July	Stanley Stadium	Tommy Miller
6 July	Wimborne Road	Basse Hveem
7 July	Yarmouth Stadium	Fred Brand
8 July	White City Stadium, Glasgow	Tommy Miller
10 July	Leicester Stadium	Olle Nygren
10 July	The Stadium, Motherwell	Ron Mountford
11 July	Brandon Stadium	Charlie New
11 July	Sun Street Stadium	Brian Crutcher
18 July	Old Meadowbank	Don Cuppleditch
24 July	Monmore Green Stadium	Harry Bastable

=== Stage 5 ===
==== Championship Round ====
- Top 16 qualify for World final, 17th-20th reserves for World final

Date	Venue	Winner
14 August	Knowle Stadium	Dick Bradley
15 August	Harringay Stadium	Olle Nygren
17 August	Wimbledon Stadium	Ronnie Moore
18 August	West Ham Stadium	Jack Young
20 August	Wembley Stadium	Jack Biggs
22 August	Hyde Road Stadium	Ronnie Moore
22 August	Odsal Stadium	Arthur Forrest
26 August	Perry Barr Stadium	Graham Warren
28 August	The Firs Stadium	Aub Lawson

==== Scores ====
- Top 16 qualify for World final, 17th-20th reserves for World final

Pos.	Rider	Total pts
1	(New Zealand) Ronnie Moore	29
2	(Sweden) Olle Nygren	28
3	(Australia) Jack Young	27
4	(England) Arthur Forrest	26
5	(Australia) Jack Biggs	25
6	(England) Dick Bradley	25
7	(Wales) Freddie Williams	25
8	(Australia) Aub Lawson	25
9	(England) Alan Hunt	25
10	(England) Jeff Lloyd	24
11	(England) Split Waterman	24
12	(Wales) Eric Williams	24
13	(New Zealand) Geoff Mardon	24
14	(England) Brian Crutcher	23
15	(Sweden) Rune Sörmander	23
16	(Australia) Graham Warren	23
17	(England) Dent Oliver	23
18	(Australia) Arthur Payne	22
19	(England) Louis Lawson	21
20	(New Zealand) Maury Dunn	21
21	(England) Wally Green	20
22	(England) Len Williams	20
23	(England) Ron How	19
24	(Australia) Ken Walsh	19
25	(England) Harry Edwards	18
26	(England) Howdy Byford	18
27	(England) Don Cuppleditch	17
28	(England) Billy Hole	17
29	(England) Tommy Miller	16
30	(New Zealand) Ron Johnston	16
31	(England) Bill Kitchen	16
32	(Sweden) Dan Forsberg	14
33	(Australia) Dick Seers	14
34	(England) Fred Brand	14
35	(England) Eric Boothroyd	14
36	(New Zealand) Charlie New	13

Pos.	Rider	Total pts
37	(England) Bob Fletcher	13
38	(England) Ken Middleditch	13
39	(Australia) Peter Moore	12
40	(Scotland) Bob Mark	11
41	(England) Jack Parker	11
42	(England) Ron Clarke	11
43	(England) Terry Small	11
44	(England) John Reason	11
45	(England) Harry Bastable	11
46	(England) Jim Tolley	11
47	(Sweden) Olle Segerström	11
48	(Sweden) Stig Pramberg	11
49	(New Zealand) Peter Clark	10
50	(England) Harry Welsh	10
51	(Scotland) Ken McKinlay	9
52	(England) Fred Rogers	9
53	(New Zealand) Les Hewitt	8
54	(Sweden) Sune Karlsson	8
55	(England) Reg Reeves	7
56	(England) Phil Clarke	7
57	(England) Charlie May	7
58	(New Zealand) Barry Briggs	6
59	(England) Geoff Pymar	6
60	(England) Peter Robinson	6
61	(England) Malcolm Craven	6
62	(New Zealand) Trevor Redmond	5.5
63	(England) Pat Clark	5
64	(England) Bill Holden	4
65	(England) Alan Kidd	3
66	(England) Don Potter	3
67	(England) Ron Mountford	3
68	(Norway) Basse Hveem	3
69	(New Zealand) Dick Campbell	2
70	(England) Bob Baker	2
71	(Scotland) Gordon McGregor	2

== World final ==
- 17 September 1953
- (England) London, Wembley Stadium

Pos.	Rider	Heat Scores	Total
1	(Wales) Freddie Williams	(3,3,3,2,3)	14
2	(England) Split Waterman	(3,3,3,3,1)	13
3	(New Zealand) Geoff Mardon	(3,2,3,1,3)	12+3
4	(Sweden) Olle Nygren	(2,3,2,3,2)	12+2
5	(Australia) Jack Young	(3,2,3,2,F)	10
6	(New Zealand) Ronnie Moore	(F,1,2,3,3)	9
7	(England) Jeff Lloyd	(2,2,F,3,1)	8
8	(England) Arthur Forrest	(2,2,0,0,3)	7
9	(Australia) Aub Lawson	(1,3,2,1,0)	7
10	(England) Brian Crutcher	(1,1,1,2,1)	6
11	(Sweden) Rune Sörmander	(0,0,1,2,2)	5
12	(Australia) Graham Warren	(0,0,2,1,2)	5
13	(Wales) Eric Williams	(1,1,1,1,F)	4
14	(England) Alan Hunt	(0,0,1,0,2)	3
15	(England) Dick Bradley	(2,F,0,0,0)	2
16	(Australia) Jack Biggs	(1,1,0,0,-)	2
R1	(England) Dent Oliver	(1)	1
R2	(Australia) Arthur Payne	did not ride	-

=== Classification ===
Placing	Rider	Total	1	2	3	4	5	6	7	8	9	10	11	12	13	14	15	16	17	18	19	20	Pts	Pos
1	(Wales) (1) Freddie Williams	14	3				3				3				2				3				14	1
2	(England) (10) Split Waterman	13			3			3						3			3		1				13	2
3	(New Zealand) (14) Geoff Mardon	12+3				3		2					3		1							3	12	3
4	(Sweden) (15) Olle Nygren	12+2				2			3			2						3	2				12	4
5	(Australia) (5) Jack Young	10		3			2					3					2					-	10	5
6	(New Zealand) (13) Ronnie Moore	9				-	1							2		3					3		7	6
7	(England) (12) Jeff Lloyd	9			2					2		-			3						1		2	7
8	(England) (7) Arthur Forrest	7		2					2					0	0					3			7	8
9	(Australia) (8) Aub Lawson	7		1						3			2			1			0				7	9
10	(England) (2) Brian Crutcher	6	1					1				1				2				1			6	10
11	(Sweden) (4) Rune Sörmander	5	0							0				1				2				2	5	11
12	(Australia) (6) Graham Warren	5		0				0			2							1			2		5	12
13	(Wales) (16) Eric Williams	4				1				1	1						1			-			4	13
14	(England) (9) Alan Hunt	3			0		0						1					0		2			3	14
15	(England) (3) Dick Bradley	2	2						-				0				0				0		2	15
16	(Australia) (11) Jack Biggs	2			1				1		0					0						-	2	16
17	(England) (17) Dent Oliver	1																				1	1	17
18	(Australia) (18) Arthur Payne	0																					0	18
Placing	Rider	Total	1	2	3	4	5	6	7	8	9	10	11	12	13	14	15	16	17	18	19	20	Pts	Pos

m - exclusion for exceeding two minute time allowance • t - exclusion for touching the tapes • x - other exclusion • e - retired or mechanical failure • f - fell • ns - non-starter • nc - non-classify

gate A - inside	gate B	gate C	gate D - outside
