= 1950 Individual Speedway World Championship =

5th edition of the World motorcycle speedway championship

Seasons
- ← 1949 1951 →

The 1950 Individual Speedway World Championship was the fifth edition of the official World Championship to determine the world champion rider.

The title was won by Welshman Freddie Williams with the pivotal heat being the heat against Australian Graham Warren. Warren and Williams both unbeaten met in their third rides and as Warren challenged Williams for the lead he was forced to drop behind Williams. Warren then hit a bump and fell which cost him valuable points and the chance to win the title.

Ronnie Moore became the youngest finalist at the age of just 17.

== First qualifying round ==
- The top 74 riders qualify for the second qualifying round, where they will be joined by seeded division 2 riders.

Date	Venue	Winner
12 June	Stanley Stadium	Jack Hughes
12 June	Wimborne Road	Ray Ellis
13 June	Cornish Stadium	Hugh Geddes
15 June	Oxford Stadium	Charlie New
16 June	County Ground Stadium	Bob McFarlane
16 June	Leicester Stadium	Les Hewitt
17 June	Rayleigh Weir Stadium	Ticker James
17 June	Abbey Stadium	Reg Duval

== Second qualifying round ==
- The top 73 riders qualify for the Third qualifying round.

Date	Venue	Winner
5 July	Highbury Stadium (Fleetwood)	Merv Harding
5 July	White City Stadium, Glasgow	Frank Hodgson
6 July	Pennycross Stadium	George Wall
6 July	Owlerton Stadium	Pete Lansdale
7 July	The Shay	Les Hewitt
8 July	Brandon Stadium	Alan Hunt
8 July	Old Meadowbank	Dick Campbell
8 July	The Firs Stadium	Jack Young

== Third qualifying round ==
- The top 2 riders from each meeting qualify for the Championship round, where they will meet 34 seeded division 1 riders.

Date	Venue	Winner/2nd
25 July	Ashfield Stadium	Jack Young / Derick Close
25 July	Banister Court Stadium	Merv Harding / Ron Mason
25 July	Yarmouth Stadium	Les Hewitt / Eddie Rigg
29 July	Sun Street Stadium	Junior Bainbridge / Mike Erskine
31 July	Dudley Wood Stadium	Geoff Pymar / Ken Sharples
31 July	Brough Park Stadium	Lindsay Mitchell / Dick Campbell
31 July	Walthamstow Stadium	Jim Boyd / Tommy Miller

== Championship round ==
9 events in Great Britain.

=== Scores ===
- Top 16 qualify for World final, 17th & 18th reserves for World final

Pos.	Rider	Total pts
1	(Australia) Jack Young	39
2	(Australia) Graham Warren	37
3	(England) Cyril Brine	36
4	(England) Jack Parker	35
5	(Australia) Aub Lawson	34
6	(New Zealand) Ronnie Moore	34
7	(Wales) Freddie Williams	33
8	(England) Split Waterman	32
9	(Australia) Vic Duggan	32
10	(England) Dent Oliver	30
11	(England) Danny Dunton	30
12	(England) Wally Green	29
13	(England) Tommy Price	29
14	(England) Ron Clarke	29
15	(Australia) Arthur Payne	27
16	(Australia) Jack Biggs	26
17	(England) Arthur Forrest	26
18	(England) Cyril Roger	25
19	(England) Mike Erskine	23
20	(England) Norman Parker	23
21	(England) Alec Statham	23
22	(England) Oliver Hart	23
23	(England) Eddie Rigg	22
24	(England) Louis Lawson	21
25	(England) Derick Close	21

Pos.	Rider	Total pts
26	(England) George Wilks	21
27	(England) Malcolm Craven	20
28	(England) Alan Hunt	20
29	(England) Jeff Lloyd	20
30	(England) Ken Sharples	20
31	(England) Tommy Miller	19
32	(England) Bert Roger	17
33	(England) Geoff Bennett	16
34	(Australia) Merv Harding	16
35	(Australia) Bill Longley	16
36	(New Zealand) Dick Campbell	15
37	(Canada) Eric Chitty	15
38	(United States) Charles Cullum	15
39	(England) Ron Mason	14
40	(England) Eric French	13
41	(Australia) Dick Seers	13
42	(England) Bill Kitchen	12
43	(England) Jack Mountford	11
44	(England) Lindsay Mitchell	10
45	(Australia) Junior Bainbridge	8
46	(New Zealand) Les Hewitt	6
47	(England) Billy Hole	5
48	(England) Johnny Hole	4
49	(England) Dick Bradley	2

== World final ==
- 22 September 1950
- (England) London, Wembley Stadium
- Change: (England) Arthur Forrest → (England) Mike Erskine

Pos.	Rider	Points	Heats
1	(Wales) Freddie Williams	14	(3,3,3,2,3)
2	(England) Wally Green	13	(2,3,3,2,3)
3	(Australia) Graham Warren	12	(3,3,F,3,3)
4	(Australia) Aub Lawson	10	(2,2,3,1,2)
5	(England) Tommy Price	8	(3,F,3,1,1)
6	(England) Jack Parker	8	(2,1,2,3,0)
7	(England) Split Waterman	8	(1,2,3,1,1)
8	(Australia) Jack Young	7	(0,1,2,1,3)
9	(England) Cyril Brine	7	(2,2,2,0,1)
10	(New Zealand) Ronnie Moore	7	(X,0,2,3,2)
11	(England) Dent Oliver	6	(X,3,1,2,0)
12	(England) Danny Dunton	5	(1,0,1,1,2)
13	(Australia) Vic Duggan	4	(1,1,1,0,1)
14	(England) Ron Clarke	3	(1,2,0,0,0)
15	(Australia) Jack Biggs	3	(0,1,0,0,2)
16	(England) Arthur Payne	0	(0,0,-,0,0)
	(England) Cyril Roger (res)	5	(3,2)
	(England) Mike Erskine (res)	0	(0)

=== Podium ===
1950 Podium:

1. (gold) (Wales) Freddie Williams
2. (silver) (England) Wally Green
3. (bronze) (Australia) Graham Warren
