= Cyril Brine =

British motorcycle speedway rider

- Born: 6 February 1918; Borehamwood, England
- Died: Q3, 1988 (aged 70)
- Nickname: Salty
- Nationality: British (English)

Career history
- 1946–1962: Wimbledon

Team honours
- 1954, 1955, 1956, 1958, 1959, 1960, 1961 1950, 1951, 1953, 1956, 1959, 1960, 1962: National League Champion National Trophy winner
- 1962: National League KO Cup Winner
- 1954: RAC Cup Winner
- 1959: Britannia Shield Winner

Cyril Harry Brine (6 February 1918 in Borehamwood, Hertfordshire, England – 1988) was an international speedway who qualified for the Speedway World Championship finals twice.

== Career ==
Brine began speedway racing in 1938. He initially rode at the training track at Rye House. Brine spent his entire career with one club, the Wimbledon Dons, where he made over 460 league appearances and scored over 2700 points, a club record. In his seventeen-season career with the Dons, he won the National League Championship seven times and the National Trophy seven times.

During the speedway winters, Brine built bike frames in a Boreham Wood garage, with his brother Percy Brine and brother-in-law Dick Geary.

Brine made his debut for England national speedway team in 1949. He retired from speedway in early 1963. At retirement he had earned 12 international caps for England.

Brine's elder brother Percy also rode.

== World final appearances ==
- 1950 – (England) London, Wembley Stadium – 9th – 7pts
- 1951 – (England) London, Wembley Stadium – 13th – 3pts
