= Arthur Wright (speedway rider) =

British motorcycle speedway rider

- Born: 14 October 1933; Bradford, West Riding of Yorkshire
- Died: 7 November 2016 (aged 83)
- Nationality: British (English)

Career history
- 1950: Halifax Dukes
- 1951-1957: Bradford Tudors
- 1958-1959: Oxford Cheetahs
- 1959-1961: Belle Vue Aces

Individual honours
- 1955: Speedway World Championship finalist

Team honours
- 1960: Britannia Shield

Arthur Wright (14 October 1933 – 7 November 2016) was a motorcycle speedway rider from England. He earned seven international caps for the England national speedway team.

== Speedway career ==
Wright was a leading speedway rider in the 1950s. He reached the final of the Speedway World Championship in the 1955 Individual Speedway World Championship.

Wright rode in the top tier of British Speedway, riding for Bradford Tudors.

After seven seasons with Bradford, Wright joined Oxford Cheetahs in 1958 before going on to ride for Belle Vue Aces.

== World final appearances ==
=== Individual World Championship ===
- 1955 – (England) London, Wembley Stadium – 10th – 6pts

== Family ==
Wright's brother-in-law Arthur Forrest was also a speedway rider who reached five World finals.
