= Dick Seers =

Australian speedway rider

- Born: 14 August 1926; Sydney, Australia
- Died: 10 September 2022 (aged 96); Port Macquarie, Australia

Career history
- 1948: Fleetwood Flyers
- 1949: Halifax Dukes
- 1949: Glasgow Tigers
- 1950, 1953–1954: Bradford Tudors

Richard Rock Seers (14 August 1926 – 10 September 2022) was an Australian speedway rider who rode in the top division of British speedway and represented Australia in internationals.

== Early life ==
Seers was born in 1926, the fifth child of Thomas Seers and Phoebe Rock. He joined the Enfield Burwood Cycling Club and finished third in the New South Wales under 16 Championships but gave up cycling after breaking his leg.

== Career summary ==
Seers started racing in 1947 at the Sydney Sportsground. He moved to Coppull, near Wigan in England and resided with Oliver Hart and Ron Hart. He first rode in Britain for the Fleetwood Flyers during the 1948 Speedway National League Division Two season. He then appeared for Glasgow Tigers in 1949. He came to prominence when riding for the Halifax Dukes in 1949, scoring 14 maximums. In 1950, he was selected as reserve for Australia against England in a test match and moved to the highest league in Britain after joining the Bradford Tudors for the 1950 Speedway National League season.

During 1951 and 1952, Seers returned to Australia and placed fourth in the Australian Solo Championship. He represented Australia again against England during 1953 and actually rode this time having previously standing as reserve only in 1950. He spent two more seasons riding for Bradford during the 1953 Speedway National League and 1954 Speedway National League seasons.

== Personal life ==
By trade, Seers was a motorcycle showroom owner and a sales rep but had a big break after buying the distribution rights to the Lancia Aurelia, which enabled him to set up Lamda Motors.

Seers died in 2022.
