= Frank Lawrence =

British speedway rider (1920–??)

- Born: 11 October 1920
- Nationality: British (English)

Career history
- 1946: West Ham Hammers
- 1946–1953: New Cross Rangers
- 1953–1954: Harringay Racers

Team honours
- 1948: National League Champion
- 1947, 1953: London Cup Winner
- 1953: Coronation Cup Winner

Frank Lawrence (born 11 October 1920) was a motorcycle speedway rider from England, who rode for New Cross in the post-World War II period.

== Career ==
Lawrence began his career before the war at Dagenham, but his career was put on hold while he served during the war in the Royal Air Force as a fighter pilot, flying Hawker Typhoons. He married in 1940 but was shot down by the German forces and held as a prisoner of war for three and a half years.

When speedway racing resumed in 1946, Lawrence joined the West Ham Hammers, where he was hurt in a freak accident when Jack Cooley crashed, his bike going through the safety fence and hitting Lawrence while he sat in the pits. He transferred later in the season to New Cross where he became a regular member of the team.

Lawrence scored 15 points in the qualifying rounds for the 1951 Individual Speedway World Championship. He represented England in an unofficial test match against Australia in Dublin in 1950, scoring 10 points.

When New Cross speedway closed in 1953, Lawrence moved on to Harringay Racers.
