= Arthur Payne (speedway rider) =

Australian international speedway rider (1923–2025)

- Born: 28 August 1923; Sydney, New South Wales, Australia
- Died: c. October 2025 (aged 102)
- Nationality: Australian

Career history
- 1947–1948: Tamworth Hounds
- 1948–1954: Birmingham Brummies

Team honours
- 1948: Anniversary Cup (Div 2) winner
- 1948: National Trophy (Div 2) winner
- 1953, 1954: Midland Cup

Arthur Frank Payne (28 August 1923 – c. October 2025) was an Australian international speedway rider, who finished fifth in the 1952 Speedway World Championship final.

== Life and career ==
Payne was born on 28 August 1923. He arrived in the United Kingdom in 1947, and signed up with the Tamworth Hounds in the National League Division Three. After scoring almost three hundred points for the Hounds, he was subject to a failed transfer to Wimbledon before he was transferred to the Birmingham Brummies for £500, a record fee for a third division rider at that time.

Payne struck up an excellent partnership with Brummies captain Stan Dell and the Brummies were promoted from National League Division Two at the end of the 1948 season. In 1949, with the Brummies in National League Division One, Payne had ridden in all three divisions within the first three years of his career.

It was with the Brummies where Payne's career flourished, reaching the World Final three times in four years, finishing fifth in his second appearance. He twice won the Midland Cup with Birmingham in 1953 and 1954 respectively.

In September 2015, it was noted that Payne, aged 91, was living in the Hervey Bay area of Queensland, and still regularly played golf. In October 2025, it was announced that Payne had died at the age of 102.

== World final appearances ==
- 1950 - (England) London, Wembley Stadium - 16th - 0pts
- 1952 - (England) London, Wembley Stadium - 5th - 9pts
- 1953 - (England) London, Wembley Stadium - Res - Did Not Ride
