= Henry Andersen (speedway rider) =

Norwegian speedway rider

- Nationality: Norwegian

Career history
- 1951: Fantomene

Individual honours
- 1950: Norwegian Championship
- 1955: Speedway World Championship finalist
- 1955: European champion

Henry Andersen (1926-1999) also known as Henry 'Stompa' Andersen was a speedway rider from Norway.

== Speedway career ==
Andersen was a former champion of Norway, winning the Norwegian Championship in 1950.

Andersen reached the final of the Speedway World Championship in the 1955 Individual Speedway World Championship. He was also the 1955 European champion.

Andersen did not ride in the Britiah leagues but did tour the United Kingdom with the Norway national speedway team in 1951 and the Fantomene club the same season.

=== Individual World Championship ===
- 1955 - (England) London, Wembley Stadium - 15th - 2pts
