= Eric Williams (speedway rider) =

Welsh motorcycle driver (1927–2009)

- Born: 17 November 1927; Taibach, Port Talbot, Wales
- Died: 24 July 2009 (aged 81); Mackay, Queensland, Australia
- Nationality: British (Welsh)

Career history
- 1948: Birmingham Brummies
- 1949: Cradley Heathens
- 1950-1955: Wembley Lions
- 1960-1961: New Cross Rangers
- 1962: Norwich Stars

Individual honours
- 1951, 1953, 1955: Speedway World Championship finalist

Team honours
- 1950, 1951, 1952, 1953: League Champion
- 1954: National Trophy Winner
- 1950, 1951, 1954: London Cup

William Eric Williams (17 November 1927 – 24 July 2009) was a motorcycle speedway rider from Wales. With no Welsh team to represent, he earned 23 international caps for the England national speedway team.

== Speedway career ==
Williams was a leading speedway rider in the 1950s. He reached the final of the Speedway World Championship on three occasions in the 1951 Individual Speedway World Championship, 1953 Individual Speedway World Championship and 1955 Individual Speedway World Championship.

Williams rode in the top tiers of British Speedway, starting with Birmingham Brummies in 1948. He rode primarily for Wembley Lions, where he achieved great success as part of the Wembley team that dominated British speedway from 1950 to 1953. With them, he won three National League titles, a national Trophy and three London Cups. He also averaged 9.66 and 9.79 in 1953 and 1954 respectively.

== World Final appearances ==
=== Individual World Championship ===
- 1951 – (England) London, Wembley Stadium – 12th - 6pts
- 1953 – (England) London, Wembley Stadium – 13th - 4pts
- 1955 – (England) London, Wembley Stadium – 4th - 12+1pts

== Family ==
Williams' two brothers, Freddie and Ian were also speedway riders, Freddie was a double World champion.
