= Bill Longley (speedway rider) =

Australian speedway rider (1911–2005)

- Born: 11 November 1911; Dandenong, Victoria
- Died: 29 April 2005 (aged 93)
- Nationality: Australian

Career history
- 1937–1939, 1947–1953: New Cross Rangers
- 1946: Odsal Boomerangs
- 1953: Bradford Tudors
- 1953–1954: Wimbledon Dons
- 1955: Rayleigh Rockets
- 1955: Wembley Lions

Individual honours
- 1946: Northern Riders' Champion

Team honours
- 1938, 1948, 1954: National League Champion
- 1947: London Cup
- 1954: RAC Cup Winner

William Mowbray Longley (11 November 1911 in Dandenong, Victoria – 15 April 2005) was an Australian international speedway rider.

== Career summary ==
Longley noted as being only 5 ft 1 inch in height, began his British career with the New Cross Rangers in 1937, where he remained until the outbreak of World War II, winning the National League Championship in 1938.

In 1946, Longley rode for Odsal but returned to New Cross in 1947 and was again a member of the team that won the 1948 National League Championship. Longley finished ninth in the Speedway World Championship in 1949 and remained with New Cross until they closed in 1953. He joined Bradford for a short spell with the Tudors before returning to London with the Wimbledon Dons.

In 1950, Longley finished runner up in the Australian Championship.

Longley was a member of the Wimbledon team that won the 1954 National League Championship. In 1955 he had a short spell with the Rayleigh Rockets before riding in one meeting for the Wembley Lions. He then decided to retire.

== World Final Appearances ==
- 1949 – (England) London, Wembley Stadium – 9th – 8pts
