= Kjell Carlsson =

Swedish speedway rider

- Born: 31 August 1918
- Died: 1993 (aged 75)
- Nationality: Swedish

Career history
- 1950-1951: Filbyterna
- 1952-1956: Kaparna

Individual honours
- 1955: Speedway World Championship finalist
- 1956: Continental Champion

Team honours
- 1950: Allsvenskan Champion

Kjell Carlsson (1918–1993) was a Swedish international speedway rider.

== Speedway career ==
Carlsson reached the final of the Speedway World Championship in the 1955 Individual Speedway World Championship. He rode in the top tier of Swedish Speedway, riding for various clubs, and reached the 1950 Swedish final.

Carlsson rode primarily for Kaparna in Sweden.

== World final appearances ==
- 1955 — (England) London, Wembley Stadium — 13th-3pts
