= Cornish Stadium =

Greyhound racing track and speedway in England

- Location: Par Moor Road, St Austell, Cornwall PL25 3RP
- Coordinates: 50°20′41″N 4°44′12″W
- Opened: 1949
- Closed: 1988

The Cornish Stadium was a greyhound racing track and speedway venue in Par Moor Road, St Austell, Cornwall.

== Opening ==
The track opened in May 1949 for speedway and was located on the north side of Par Moor Road and south side of St Austell Road.

== Greyhound racing ==
Independent (unaffiliated to a governing body) greyhound racing took place from 11 July 1958 until 1986 over race distances of 250, 458, 650 and 860 metres.

== Speedway ==
Speedway took place from 1949 until 1964.

== Motor sports ==
Stock car racing took place between 1980 and 1987 shortly before the closure of the stadium. Sidecar Racing, Midget Racing and Go Karts were also held at the venue.

== Closure ==
The stadium was redeveloped into the Cornish Market World in 1988.
