= Dent Oliver =

British motorcycle speedway rider

- Born: 13 April 1918; Crook, County Durham, England
- Died: 15 December 1973 (aged 55); Disley, Cheshire, England
- Nationality: British (English)

Career history
- 1946-1950, 1952, 1965: Belle Vue Aces
- 1951-1954, 1956: Bradford Tudors
- 1963-1964: Sheffield Tigers

Team honours
- 1946, 1947, 1949: National Trophy winner
- 1946: A.C.U. Cup winner
- 1963, 1964: Provincial Northern League winner

John Walter Denton Oliver (13 April 1918 – 15 December 1973) was an international motorcycle speedway rider who qualified for the Speedway World Championship finals three times. He earned 19 international caps for the England national speedway team.

== Career ==
Oliver started speedway in 1945 and received guidance and support from pre-war rider Bob Harrison. In 1946, he joined the Belle Vue Aces. After an impressive first two seasons, he was called up to race for England in the 1947-1948 Ashes Test series in Australia.

In 1949, Oliver reached the first of his three World Final appearances, but in 1951 he announced his retirement. Later that year, he was persuaded into riding again by the Bradford Tudors, on a £300 loan from Belle Vue. Belle Vue re-signed him at the start of 1952, but he later rejoined the Tudors and remained there until he retired in 1954. He briefly came out of retirement in 1956 to ride nine meetings for the Tudors before retiring again.

In 1963, at the age of 45, Oliver returned to racing with the Sheffield Tigers in the Provincial League following a call from Frank Varey. He remained with the team for two seasons until 1965, when the Belle Vue Aces used him for a few matches that season. He finally retired at the end of 1965 but remained on the staff at Belle Vue. He became team manager and in 1970, 1971 and 1972, the team won the British League.

In 1973, Oliver suffered a serious deterioration in his health and died in December.

== World final appearances ==
- 1949 - (England) London, Wembley Stadium - 16th - 0pts
- 1950 - (England) London, Wembley Stadium - 11th - 6pts
- 1953 - (England) London, Wembley Stadium - Res - 1pt
