= Cyril Maidment =

British motorcycle speedway rider

- Born: 31 January 1929; London, England
- Died: 31 January 2004 (aged 75); Tenerife, Canary Islands
- Nationality: British (English)

Career history
- 1951–1961, 1969–1971: Wimbledon Dons
- 1951: Wolverhampton Wolves
- 1953: St Austell Gulls
- 1962–1968: Belle Vue Aces

Individual honours
- 1961, 1964: Speedway World Championship finalist

Team honours
- 1954, 1955, 1956, 1958, 1959, 1960, 1961, 1963: National League Champion
- 1956, 1959, 1960: National Trophy winner
- 1969, 1970: British League KO Cup Winner
- 1954: RAC Cup
- 1959: Britannia Shield
- 1969, 1970: London Cup

Cyril Edward Maidment (31 January 1929 – 31 January 2004) was an international motorcycle speedway rider from England. He earned six international caps for the England national speedway team and 16 caps for the Great Britain team.

== Speedway career ==
Maidment reached the final of the Speedway World Championship on two occasions in the 1961 Individual Speedway World Championship and the 1964 Individual Speedway World Championship.

Maidment rode in the top tier of British Speedway from 1951 to 1968, riding for various clubs, winning the National League on eight occasions.

After spending over ten years with Wimbledon Dons from 1951 to 1961, Maidment rode for Belle Vue Aces. He went on to captain Belle Vue.

== World final appearances ==
=== Individual World Championship ===
- 1961 – (Sweden) Malmö, Malmö Stadion - 12th - 4pts
- 1964 – (Sweden) Gothenburg, Ullevi – 7th – 8pts

=== World Team Cup ===
- 1962 - (Czech Republic) Slaný, Slaný Speedway Stadium (with Barry Briggs / Ronnie Moore / Peter Craven / Ron How) - 2nd - 24pts (0)
