= Bob Duckworth (speedway rider) =

New Zealand speedway rider (1929–2023)

- Born: 25 August 1929; Mossburn, New Zealand
- Died: 1 November 2023 (aged 94); Auckland, New Zealand

Career history
- 1951: Otago
- 1951–1952, 1954–1962: Belle Vue Aces
- 1953: St Austell Gulls
- 1963: Newcastle Diamonds

Team honours
- 1958: National Trophy
- 1957, 1958, 1960: Britannia Shield

Robert Francis Duckworth (25 August 1929 – 1 November 2023) was a New Zealand international motorcycle speedway rider. He earned 8 caps for the New Zealand national speedway team.

== Speedway career ==
Duckworth began riding speedway at Tahuna Park in Dunedin in 1949. He moved to England in 1951 and joined the Belle Vue Aces, but only made four appearances in his first two seasons with the team. In 1953, he rode for the St Austell Gulls in the Southern League. The following year, he rejoined Belle Vue in the top tier of British Speedway. The Belle Vue promoter Johnnie Hoskins paid £2.10s for his transfer from St Austell, and gave him the nickname of ‘Fifty Bob’ Duckworth.

During his second spell with Belle Vue, Duckworth progressed to become one of the team's heat leaders. In 1961, he finished in the top ten averages of UK speedway in the Speedway National League despite being injured in early August and unable to ride for the rest of the season. He resumed riding for Belle Vue in June 1962 but was unable to regain his previous form. In 1963, he left Belle Vue to join the Newcastle Diamonds in the Provincial League. The following year, he returned to New Zealand where he continued to ride until the early 1970s at Western Springs Stadium. In 1964, he finished third equal on points in the New Zealand Speedway Championship, but lost the runoff for third place to Bob Andrews.

Duckworth represented his country New Zealand in the 1960 Speedway World Team Cup and 1961 Speedway World Team Cup.

Duckworth competed in the Championship Round of the Speedway World Championship in 1955 and 1956 and the British/Commonwealth Round in 1958. In 1961 he qualified for the British semi-final of the World Championship but was injured during the meeting at Southampton in August and had to withdraw.

== Death ==
Duckworth died in Auckland on 1 November 2023, at the age of 94.
