= Karl Killmeyer =

Austrian speedway rider

- Born: 29 October 1929; Vienna, Austria
- Died: 23 October 2015 (aged 85); Austria
- Nationality: Austrian

Individual honours
- 1947: Golden Helmet of Pardubice silver

Karl Killmeyer (29 October 1929 – 23 October 2015) was an international motorcycle speedway rider from Austria and earned multiple international caps for the Austria national speedway team.

== Career ==
Killmeyer born in Vienna, Austria, followed his older brother Leopold Killmeyer into speedway. After World War II, he was finally able to race in Vienna on 22 April 1946. On 7 September 1947, he finished runner-up to Hugo Rosák in the prestigious Golden Helmet of Pardubice.

Killmeyer first rode in the Speedway World Championship in 1949 (when continental riders participated for the first time since the war) at a meeting at Tamworth Greyhound Stadium.

Killmeyer was one of the stronger European riders during the World Championship qualifying races and reached the Continental Speedway final in 1953, 1954, 1955 and 1958.

== Music ==
Killmeyer topped the Austrian hit parade with a 1950s song called Speedway-Fox.

== Family ==
Killmeyer's older brother Leopold was also an international speedway rider.
