= Malcolm Craven =

British motorcycle speedway rider

- Born: 25 September 1915; Ilford, England
- Died: 2 September 1984 (aged 68); Canada
- Nationality: British (English)

Career history
- 1937: Norwich Stars
- 1937: Birmingham Bulldogs
- 1938–1939: Wembley Lions
- 1946–1954: West Ham Hammers

Malcolm Stewart Craven (25 September 1915 – 2 September 1984) was a motorcycle speedway rider from England, who rode before and after World War II.

== Career ==
Craven was born in Ilford, Essex on 25 September 1915. He had a trial for Norwich Stars in 1937 but was rejected by Max Grosskreutz. After practising at the Dagenham track, he was spotted by his childhood hero, the former Wembley Lions rider Colin Watson, who took him to Wembley for a trial, after which he was signed by Alec Jackson. He was loaned to the Birmingham Bulldogs for whom he finished the season as top scorer, returning to Wembley in 1938 where he initially rode at reserve, establishing himself in the top five by the following year. The war interrupted his speedway career and he joined the Merchant Navy. When league racing resumed in 1946, he signed for West Ham Hammers, staying with the club into the 1950s.

In 1947, Craven rode in Australia with the England Test team. He was part of the England teams that toured Australia in the 1951-1952 Test series. In 1952 he captained the England team against Scotland.

== Personal life ==
Craven was a qualified pilot, flying to speedway matches on occasion.

Two of Craven's brothers were also speedway riders; Gil Craven rode for Cradley Heath, and his oldest brother Reg Craven was killed in a speedway crash in 1948.
