= Fred Rogers (speedway rider) =

British motorcycle speedway rider

- Born: 1 January 1929; Sheffield, England
- Died: November 2001 (aged 72)
- Nationality: British (English)

Career history
- 1947: Odsal Boomerangs
- 1948: Newcastle Diamonds
- 1948: Yarmouth Bloaters
- 1948–1954: Norwich Stars
- 1955–1956: Belle Vue Aces

Team honours
- 1950, 1951: League champion (tier 2)
- 1951: National Trophy (tier 2)
- 1951: Southern Shield

Fred Rogers (1 January 1929 – November 2001) was an international motorcycle speedway rider from England. He earned one international cap for the England national speedway team.

== Biography ==
Rogers, born in Sheffield, began his British leagues career riding for Odsal Boomerangs during the 1947 Speedway National League. On his debut, he made an immediate impact in front of 17,784 fans by battling hard for three points.

The following season in 1948, Rogers rode for Newcastle Diamonds in division 2 and Yarmouth Bloaters in division 3 before moving from Newcastle to join the Norwich Stars. He would spend six more years with Norwich from 1949 to 1954, his average peaking in 1951 at 8.38. He helped Norwich win the division 2 league title in 1950 and the league and National Trophy double in 1951.

Rogers retired after the 1954 season but made a comeback after sealing a transfer to Belle Vue Aces (because he was still officially a Norwich rider) for the 1955 Speedway National League season.
