= Billy Bales =

British speedway rider (1929–2023)

- Born: 6 June 1929; Norwich, Norfolk, England
- Died: 19 June 2023 (aged 94)
- Nationality: British (English)

Career history
- 1948–1950: Yarmouth Bloaters
- 1952–1963: Norwich Stars
- 1965–1969: Sheffield Tigers

Individual honours
- 1949: National Junior champion

Team honours
- 1955, 1963: National Trophy winner

Raymond Arthur Bales (6 June 1929 – 19 June 2023), known as Billy Bales, was an English international motorcycle speedway rider who reached the final of Speedway World Championship in 1955.

== Career ==
Bales started his career with the Yarmouth Bloaters in 1948 and broke the track record. During the 1949 Speedway National League Division Three season he continued to ride for Yarmouth and topped the league averages after finishing the season with a calculated average of 10.44. He stayed at Yarmouth until the start of 1950 when he was called up for National Service.

On his return, Bales joined his hometown club, the Norwich Stars and stayed there for thirteen consecutive seasons. The Stars won the National Trophy twice in that time and Bales was selected to ride for England as well as qualifying for the World Final in 1955.

The Norwich Stars speedway club closed in 1964, which forced Bales to move on. He was signed by the Sheffield Tigers and remained there until he retired in 1969. At retirement he had earned 12 caps for England and 1 cap for Great Britain.

== Death ==
Bales died on 18 June 2023, 13 days after his 94th birthday.

== World Final Appearances ==
- 1955 – (England) London, Wembley Stadium – 11th – 6pts
