= Brian Crutcher =

British motorcycle speedway rider

- Born: 23 August 1934 (age 92); Parkstone, England
- Nickname: Nipper
- Nationality: British (English)

Career history
- 1951-1953: Poole Pirates
- 1953-1956: Wembley Lions
- 1957-1960: Southampton Saints

Individual honours
- 1956: London Riders' Champion
- 1957, 1959: Pride of the South winner

Team honours
- 1951: National League Div 3
- 1952: National League Div 2
- 1952: National Trophy (Div 2)
- 1953: National League
- 1954: National Trophy
- 1954: London Cup

Brian Thomas Crutcher (born 23 August 1934 in Poole, England) is a former international speedway rider who finished second at the 1954 Speedway World Championship finals.

== Career ==
Crutcher made his debut for third division team the Poole Pirates in 1951 at age 16. He made his first World Final appearance in only his second year of racing in 1952, finishing in twelfth place.

At the start of 1953, Crutcher moved to first division team the Wembley Lions and appeared in the next four World Championship finals, finishing second in 1954 behind Ronnie Moore.

Cruther continued to impress at Wembley until 1956, when Wembley closed down. Crutcher then moved to the Southampton Saints until he retired from the sport in 1960.

Crutcher made 23 appearances for the Great Britain national speedway team.

== World Final appearances ==
- 1952 - (England) London, Wembley Stadium - 11th - 6pts
- 1953 - (England) London, Wembley Stadium - 10th - 6pts
- 1954 - (England) London, Wembley Stadium - Second - 13pts
- 1955 - (England) London, Wembley Stadium - 5th - 10pts
- 1956 - (England) London, Wembley Stadium - 8th - 9pts
- 1958 - (England) London, Wembley Stadium - Reserve - did not ride
- 1959 - (England) London, Wembley Stadium - 6th - 10pts
