= Gerry Hussey =

British motorcycle speedway rider

- Born: 12 March 1932; Hampstead, London
- Died: 6 March 1959 (aged 26); Rowley Park Speedway, South Australia
- Nationality: British (English)

Career history
- 1954-1955: West Ham Hammers
- 1956: Norwich Stars
- 1958: Leicester Hunters

Individual honours
- 1956, 1958: Speedway World Championship finalist
- 1956: Victorian State Champion

Gerald Arthur Hussey (12 March 1932 – 6 March 1959) was an international motorcycle speedway rider from England. He earned two international caps for the England national speedway team.

== Speedway career ==
Hussey reached the final of the Speedway World Championship in the 1956 Individual Speedway World Championship.

Hussey rode in the top tier of British Speedway, riding for various clubs. After spending the 1956 season with Norwich Stars, he missed the 1957 season, choosing to ride in Australia.

In December 1957, Hussey was badly injured racing midget cars in Australia. His injuries included head lacerations and spinal injuries. However, he continued to race midget cars and on 6 March 1959, he was killed following a crash in a midget car race at Rowley Park Speedway in South Australia.

== World Final Appearances ==
=== Individual World Championship ===
- 1955 - (England) London, Wembley Stadium- Reserve - did not ride
- 1956 - (England) London, Wembley Stadium - 16th - 0pts
- 1958 - (England) London, Wembley Stadium - 9th - 7pts
