= Alf Hagon =

English former motorcycle speedway rider (born 1931)

- Born: 3 October 1931; Ilford, England
- Nationality: British (English)

Career history
- 1953-1954: Harringay Racers
- 1955-1956: Wimbledon Dons
- 1957-1961: Leicester Hunters
- 1962-1963: Oxford Cheetahs
- 1964-1965: West Ham Hammers
- 1965: Poole Pirates

Individual honours
- 1954, 1956, 1959, 1962: British Grass Track Champion 500 cc
- 1954, 1959, 1960, 1961, 1962, 1963, 1964: British Grass Track Champion 350 cc

Team honours
- 1955, 1956: National League winner
- 1956: National Trophy winner

Alfred Joseph Hagon (born 3 October 1931) is an English former motorcycle speedway rider who later competed in Grasstrack. He manufactured off-road competition frames, forks and other components, later developing into the production of shock absorbers, specialising in modern-replicas of the traditional Girlings used as original equipment and replacements for historic motorcycles.

== Career ==
Over a 12-year career in Speedway, Hagon rode for six teams; Harringay Racers, Wimbledon Dons, Leicester Hunters, Oxford Cheetahs, West Ham Hammers and Poole Pirates. He was part of the league winning Wimbledon Dons team that won the 1955 Speedway National League and the 1956 league and cup double. He later found regular success when competing in Grasstrack.

When riding in Grasstrack, Hagon started to develop a racing machine, with the assistance of Essex motorcycle dealer and competition sponsor Tom Kirby, creating a lightweight bike powered by a JAP engine. In 1958, he established a business building speedway and grasstrack bike frames in his mother's garden shed, but progress was interrupted in 1960 when he went on tour in Australia with the England national speedway team. He represented England on four occasions.

On his return, the business transferred to Leyton, East London. This proved successful with his bikes in good demand and he retired from racing in 1965 to concentrate on the business.

However, Hagon had become involved in sprinting, appearing at the first International Dragfest in 1964, on his lightweight JAP-engined bike.

Hagon's approach to weight-reduction included a custom-made frame also containing the engine oil, his own grasstrack front forks and brake intended for lightweight category machines, dispensing with the gearbox and seat, and avoidance of a supercharger, resulting in a wet weight of 235 lb (107 kg). For the 1964 Dragfest, a competition against Americans who were using large capacity, double-engined machines – he fitted oversize pistons and cylinders to take advantage of a maximum engine-size dispensation by the ACU, raising the J.A.P. engine's capacity from 996 cc to 1,100 cc, and the power output from 84 bhp to 91 bhp, compared to a blown Vincent's 130 bhp.

In July 1967, riding a purpose-built sprint-bike powered by a supercharged V-Twin 1,260 cc JAP engine, Hagon became the first rider to record a sub-10 second time with a one-way-only 9.93 performance at Duxford for the 1/4-mile distance. This was a strip-only record, as for official recognition of world and national records two qualifying runs have to be completed in opposite-directions within one-hour, to negate the effect of wind, with an average time resulting. In October 1967 he achieved an average time of 9.95 at Elvington, Yorkshire.

Hagon followed that by setting a long-standing record of 9.432 at 153 mph at Santa Pod. In 1968 he became the first British rider to complete a flying mile at over 200 mph (206.54 mph) at RAF Honington.

== Business developments ==
Hagon's base from 1960 was a former stable block in Leyton, London. Specialising in wheel-building and accident damage repairs, he purchased the former Girling suspension operation in 1985, including the stock, manufacturing tools and drawings. He did not purchase the rights to the Girling name, instead naming his products as simply Hagon.

== Personal life ==
Hagon is married with two children and five grandchildren, and lives near Waltham Abbey in Hertfordshire.

Hagon's son is Martin and grandson is Sam, both speedway riders.
