= Phil Clarke (speedway rider) =

English speedway rider (1922–2010)

- Clarke in 1951
- Born: 30 June 1922; Norwich, England
- Died: 6 October 2010 (aged 88)
- Nationality: British (English)

Career history
- 1947-1959: Norwich Stars

Individual honours
- 1955: Speedway World Championship finalist

Team honours
- 1950, 1951: National League Division II Champion
- 1955: National Trophy Winner
- 1951: National Trophy (Div 2) Winner
- 1951: Southern Shield Winner

Philip Charles Clarke (30 June 1922 - 6 October 2010) was an English motorcycle speedway rider.

== Speedway career ==
Clarke was a leading speedway rider in the 1950s. He reached the final of the Speedway World Championship in the 1955 Individual Speedway World Championship.

Clarke first rode in the UK leagues during the 1947 Speedway National League Division Two, after joining the Norwich Stars and would soon establish himself as a regular at the club. He was their leading rider in 1950 when the club won the league title and was also instrumental in helping Norwich win the league and cup double in 1951.

Clarke followed the team when they moved up to the top tier of British Speedway in 1952. His performance in the home leg of the final of the 1955 National Trophy effectively won the trophy for Norwich.

By 1957, Clarke had become the chairman of the Speedway Riders' Association.

At retirement, Clarke had earned five international caps for the England national speedway team.

== World final appearances ==
=== Individual World Championship ===
- 1955 - (England) London, Wembley Stadium - 14th - 2pts
