= National Trophy (speedway 1931–1964) =

- Sport: Speedway
- Founded: 1931
- Replaced by: British League Knockout Cup
- Country: United Kingdom
- Most recent champion: Oxford Cheetahs

The National Trophy (speedway 1931–1964) was a speedway Knockout Cup competition in the United Kingdom for tier one teams.

== History ==
Oxford Cheetahs were the last winners of the National Trophy before it was replaced by the British League Knockout Cup in 1965.

== Winners ==
Year	Winners	Runners-up
National Trophy
1931	Wembley Lions	Stamford Bridge Pensioners
1932	Wembley Lions	Belle Vue Aces
1933	Belle Vue Aces	Wembley Lions
1934	Belle Vue Aces	Wembley Lions
1935	Belle Vue Aces	Harringay Tigers
1936	Belle Vue Aces	Hackney Wick Wolves
1937	Belle Vue Aces	New Cross Rangers
1938	Wimbledon Dons	Wembley Lions
1939+	Belle Vue Aces; Wembley Lions	shared
1946	Belle Vue Aces	Wimbledon Dons
1947	not held	
1948	Wembley Lions	New Cross Rangers
1949	Belle Vue Aces	West Ham Hammers
1950	Wimbledon Dons	Bradford Tudors
1951	Wimbledon Dons	Wembley Lions
1952	Harringay Racers	Birmingham Brummies
1953	Wimbledon Dons	Wembley Lions
1954	Wembley Lions	Norwich Stars
1955	Norwich Stars	Wembley Lions
1956	Wimbledon Dons	Belle Vue Aces
1957	not held	
1958	Belle Vue Aces	Norwich Stars
1959	Wimbledon Dons	Southampton Saints
1960	Wimbledon Dons	Norwich Stars
1961	Southampton Saints	Swindon Robins
1962	Wimbledon Dons	Swindon Robins
1963	Norwich Stars	Belle Vue Aces
1964	Oxford Cheetahs	West Ham Hammers

+ final not held due to outbreak of war, declared joint champions.

== See also ==
Knockout Cup (speedway) for full list of winners and competitions
