= Split Waterman =

English speedway rider (1923–2019)

- Born: 27 July 1923; New Malden, England
- Died: 8 October 2019 (aged 96); Spain
- Nationality: British (English)

Career history
- 1947–1949, 1956: Wembley Lions
- 1950–1954: Harringay Racers
- 1955: West Ham Hammers
- 1957: Wimbledon Dons
- 1958: Southampton Saints
- 1960–1961: New Cross Rangers
- 1962: Ipswich Witches
- 1962: Belle Vue Aces

Individual honours
- 1948: London Riders' Championship

Team honours
- 1947, 1949: National League Champion
- 1948, 1952: National Trophy winner
- 1947: British Speedway Cup winner
- 1948, 1949, 1952, 1953: London Cup winner
- 1953: Coronation Cup winner

Squire Francis Waterman (27 July 1923 – 8 October 2019), better known as Split Waterman, was an English speedway rider who twice finished second in the Speedway World Championship final. Waterman took up speedway while serving in the British Army in Italy and went on to become one of the top riders of the post-war era. He made the headlines again in the late 1960s when he was convicted of gold smuggling and firearms offences.

== Biography ==
Born in New Malden, Waterman worked as a toolmaker's apprentice after leaving school.

=== Wartime service ===
Waterman applied to join the Royal Air Force when the Second World War broke out but was unable to do so as his job as a toolmaker was classed as a reserved occupation. He joined the Local Defence Volunteers (the Home Guard) in 1942, before joining the Royal Fusiliers, and was posted to North Africa before being involved in the Allied invasion of Italy. Shrapnel wounds that led to him being declared unfit for front line service saw him transferred to the Royal Electrical and Mechanical Engineers and posted to a workshop in Pozzuoli, near Naples. Waterman acted as a despatch rider, and motorcycle racing events became a regular occurrence, and Waterman was involved in building a speedway track at Vomero Stadium. He became a proficient racer on his adapted BSA M20 bike and it was from speedway racing that Waterman gained his nickname. After falling in a race he split his racing leathers down the back, after which his colleagues referred to him as "split arse", which was later shortened to "split". After a tour of duty in Palestine, Waterman was posted to Germany where his commanding officer, a Major Fenwick, wrote to the Wembley Lions manager, Alec Jackson, with whom he had served earlier in the war, to recommend giving Waterman a trial.

=== Speedway career ===
Waterman began his career with the Wembley Lions in 1947, moving up from reserve to the main body of the team within two weeks, and winning the National League Championship. In 1948 the Lions won the National Trophy and Waterman won the prestigious London Riders' Championship, as well as making his debut for England against Australia. Waterman earned more than £3,000 in his second season as a speedway rider. The Lions won the League Championship again in 1949.

In February 1950, Waterman transferred to the Harringay Racers for a then world record transfer fee of £3,000 (£1,000 more than the previous highest fee, paid for Alec Statham), and qualified for his first of five World finals, finishing seventh. In 1951, he qualified again and, after finishing level on points with Jack Young and Jack Biggs, the three had to race off against each other to decide the championship. Young headed home Waterman followed by Biggs. He won the Match Race Championship in August 1951, taking the title from Jack Parker. He successfully defended the title twice (against Aub Lawson and Jack Young) before relinquishing it due to injury.

Waterman began the 1952 season by winning the W. J. Cearns Memorial Trophy at Wimbledon. He qualified for the World Final again in 1952 but only managed twelfth but did win the National Trophy with Harringay. His career was almost ended in 1952 by a crash at Odsal Stadium in which he sustained two broken teeth and a badly broken kneecap. The first doctor he saw suggesting amputation of the leg. A second opinion disagreed, and he was able to ride a few days later with the leg heavily strapped. His kneecap was later replaced with an artificial one. In 1953, he again finished in second place in the World Final, with his last appearance in 1954, finishing fifth. In early 1954, Waterman was elected as vice-chairman of the Speedway Riders Association, amid a dispute between second division riders and promoters over pay. A riders' strike was averted after Jack Parker resigned as chairman, with Waterman taking over that role in April. At the end of the season, Harringay closed and he transferred to the West Ham Hammers, but only stayed a season, returning to the Wembley Lions in 1956 after being allocated to the team by the Speedway Control Board.

In 1957, Waterman was on the move again to the Wimbledon Dons. After six appearances for the Dons he was dropped from the team in July and as a result announced his retirement from speedway. He returned, however, in 1958, riding in five meetings for the Southampton Saints. Waterman did not ride at all in 1959 but made a surprising return in 1960 for the New Cross Rangers. In January 1961, he took out a writ alleging misrepresentation against Premier Promotions, who had billed the wrestler Bert "Split" Waterman as "Split Waterman, ex-speedway star" in an advertisement for one of their wrestling events, which reportedly attracted hundreds of New Cross speedway fans as a result. He rode for the Rangers again in 1961 before finally ending his career after a couple of short spells with the Ipswich Witches and the Belle Vue Aces in 1962.

Waterman rode in thirty Test matches for England and captained the team in the 1953 series against Australia.

=== Later life ===
After speedway, Waterman went into business in sheet metal working and plastic injection moulding, making plastic goods for companies such as Woolworth and Airfix.

In 1967, Waterman was arrested at Newhaven while attempting to board a ferry to Dieppe, after gold with a value of £10,000 was found in the chassis of his fiancée Avril Priston's car. A subsequent raid at Priston's family home in Bedfordshire found illegal firearms. Waterman was convicted in March 1968 of attempting to smuggle gold out of Britain, as well as unlawful possession of firearms including two sub-machine guns, two rifles and three pistols, and possession of dies for forging coins. He was sentenced to four years in prison. The gold was thought to have come from a bullion van robbery in Clerkenwell. Priston was convicted of conspiracy to smuggle gold and possession of two pistols and a pen gun, and was sentenced to six months in prison. Also in 1968, Waterman was implicated in the case against the Kray twins and two other men, who were charged with conspiring to murder George Karuana. Eugene Elvey, a witness in the case, claimed that Waterman provided a "hypodermic briefcase" and poison as the means of committing the murder.

Waterman married Avril on 15 September 1970 at Caxton Hall in London, and they later lived in Nerja on the Costa del Sol, Spain. In 1977, Waterman was imprisoned in Italy after being convicted of possession of forged Spanish pesetas with a value equivalent to £500,000, as part of a plot to bring down the government of Francisco Franco.

Waterman died on 8 October 2019 at the age of 96.

== World final appearances ==
- 1950 - (England) London, Wembley Stadium - 7th - 8pts
- 1951 - (England) London, Wembley Stadium - 2nd - 12pts + 2pts
- 1952 - (England) London, Wembley Stadium - 12th - 6pts
- 1953 - (England) London, Wembley Stadium - 2nd - 13pts
- 1954 - (England) London, Wembley Stadium - 5th - 9pts
