= Harry Bastable =

British speedway rider and promoter

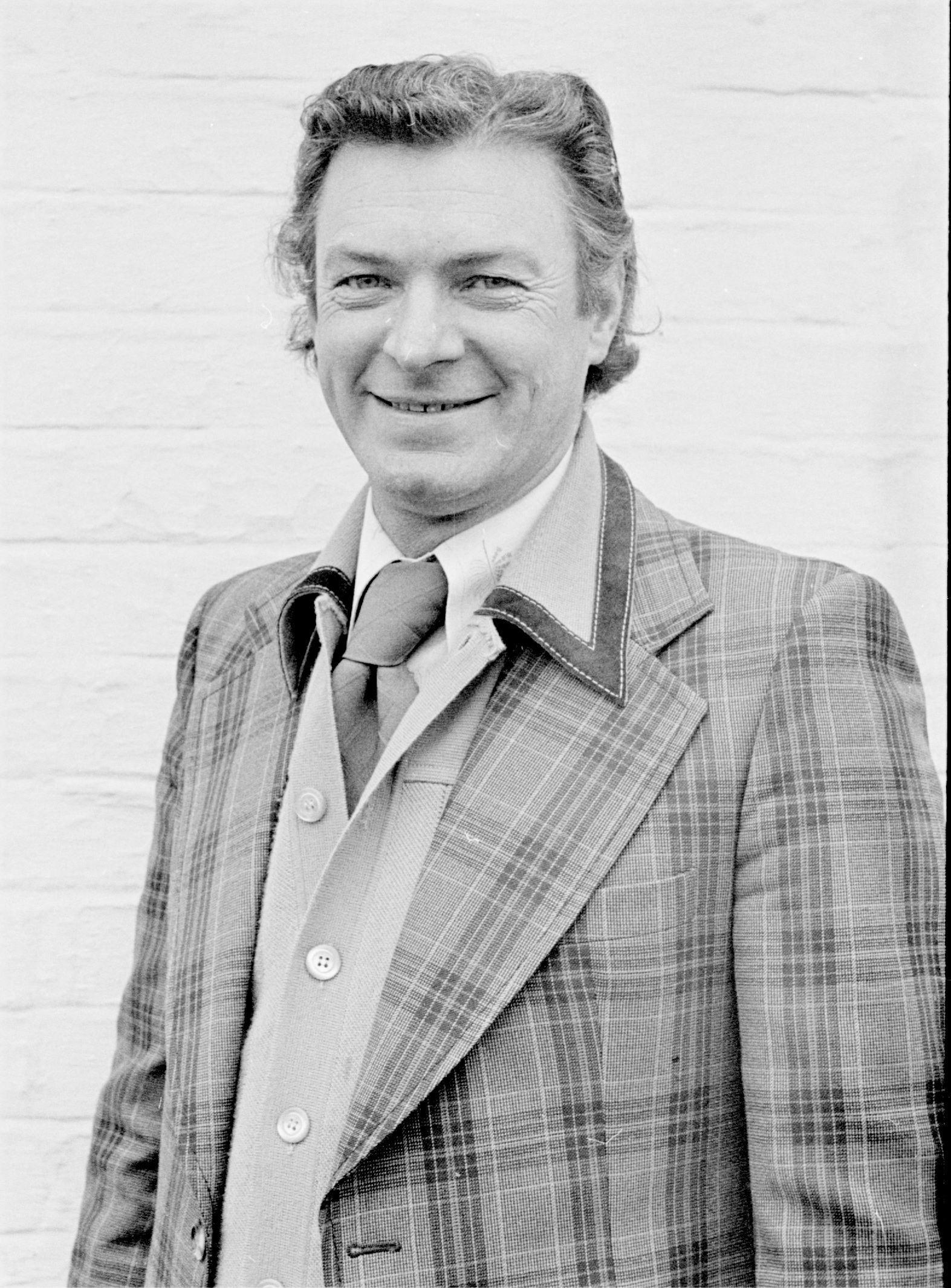
- Born: 30 August 1928; Birmingham, England
- Died: 5 September 2021 (aged 93)
- Nationality: British (English)

Career history
- 1949–1952, 1960-1965: Cradley Heathens
- 1950: Tamworth Tammies
- 1953: Wolverhampton Wasps
- 1953-1957: Birmingham Brummies
- 1957–1960: Leicester Hunters

Team honours
- 1951: Central Shield
- 1953, 1954, 1955: Midland Cup
- 1961, 1963: Provincial League KO Cup Winner
- 1963: Provincial Midland League Winner

Henry Bastable (30 August 1928 – 5 September 2021) was an international motorcycle speedway rider and promoter from England.

== Career summary ==
Bastable was a novice at the Alan Hunt 1949 winter training school when he was signed up by Cradley Heath Heathens. For experience he was loaned to the 3rd Division National League Tamworth Hounds speedway club for the 1950 season, with occasional rides at reserve for 2nd Division Cradley. He returned full-time to Cradley Heath in 1951 and in 1952 was the Heathens' top scorer.

Following the closure of speedway at Dudley Wood at the end of 1952, the Cradley team amalgamated with 3rd Division neighbours Wolverhampton Wasps to operate in the National League 2nd Division in 1953, but Bastable never liked the track and didn't show his Cradley form, moving to Birmingham Brummies in August of that year where first division racing proved hard going and he also became part of the Wolverhampton Wasps team in the second division.

In 1957, Birmingham closed mid-season, following the track fatality of Harry's mentor and Brummies skipper Alan Hunt and the ensuing 'South African Affair.' He then transferred to Leicester to ride for the Leicester Hunters, where he initially found a new lease of life. After much badgering, he shocked no one when in 1960 he left the Hunters mid-season to return to ride for his first love, Cradley Heath Heathens as their skipper in the newly formed lower level Provincial League, where he finished his racing career. A highlight of that career was when Harry and Cradley partner Ivor Brown, became the top two points scorers in the 1961 Provincial League.

Although announcing his retirement at the end of 1964, Bastable was recalled to make 16 further appearances for the Heathens at senior level racing in the new British League of 1965 to cover for injuries at Cradley, before fully retiring from riding in that same year. He started a motor-cycle business "Speedaway Motors" in Blackheath, West Midlands, (later to be joined by his son Steve Bastable, who like his father before him rode as another Cradley number one.)

In 1973, Bastable turned to the management side of speedway, to become the manager of the Cradley Heath team, whom he renamed 'Cradley United'. In 1975, he moved into promotion, taking over the licence of Stoke Potters with co-promoter Tony Allsopp, and in 1976 saved speedway at Cowley Stadium, Oxford by resurrecting Oxford Cheetahs after the departure of Oxford Rebels to White City under Danny Dunton.

== World Final appearances ==
1952 – ENG London – Qualifying Rounds – 18 points 29th place.
