= Ken Sharples =

British speedway rider

- Born: 15 May 1924; Clayton-le-Moors, Lancashire, England
- Died: 17 July 1967 (aged 43)
- Nationality: British (English)

Career history
- 1948: Edinburgh Monarchs
- 1948–1956: Belle Vue Aces
- 1948: Sheffield Tigers
- 1948: Cradley Heathens
- 1964: Sunderland Stars
- 1964–1965: Newcastle Diamonds

Team honours
- 1949: National Trophy
- 1964: Provincial League Champion

Kenneth Sharples (1924–1967) was an international speedway rider from England. He earned eight international caps for the England national speedway team.

== Speedway career ==
Sharples won eight England caps and rode in the top tier of British Speedway from 1948 to 1965, riding primarily for Belle Vue Aces. He was a product of the Hyde Road Training School and finished in the top ten UK averages during the 1955 Speedway National League riding for Belle Vue. In 1964, he came out of retirement to ride for Newcastle Diamonds.

Sharples went on to be team manager at Belle Vue Aces.
