= Doug Davies (speedway rider) =

South African speedway rider

- Born: 6 August 1936; Potchefstroom, North West (South African province)
- Died: 10 June 2000 (aged 63)
- Nationality: South African

Career history
- 1954-1956: Birmingham Brummies
- 1961: New Cross Rangers

Individual honours
- 1956: Speedway World Championship finalist
- 1962: South African National Champion

Team honours
- 1954, 1955: Midland Cup

Doug Davies (6 August 1936 – 8 June 2000) was a South Africa international motorcycle speedway rider. He earned ten caps for the South African national speedway team.

== Speedway career ==
Davies reached the final of the Speedway World Championship in the 1956 Individual Speedway World Championship.

Davies rode in the top tier of British Speedway with Birmingham Brummies from 1954 to 1956, and New Cross Rangers in 1961.

== World final appearances ==
=== Individual World Championship ===
- 1956 – (England) London, Wembley Stadium – 13th – 4pts
