= Howdy Byford =

English motorcycle speedway rider

- Born: 28 August 1919; Rainham, London
- Died: 10 June 1996 (aged 76)
- Nationality: British (English)

Career history
- 1947-1955: West Ham Hammers
- 1956-1961: Oxford Cheetahs
- 1961-1964: Exeter Falcons
- 1965: Hackney Hawks
- 1966-1967: King's Lynn Stars

Team honours
- 1962: Provincial Knockout Cup.

Francis Howard Byford (28 August 1919 – 10 June 1996) was an international motorcycle speedway rider from England. He earned six international caps for the England national speedway team.

== Biography ==
Byford was born in 1919 in Rainham, London. During World War II he was a Japanese prisoner of war for three and a half years and was fairly near the Atomic bombing of Hiroshima.

Byford took a job at West Ham Stadium as a plumber before taking an interest in speedway. In 1947, he joined the West Ham Hammers for the 1947 Speedway National League season. He rode for West Ham for nine years and although the team failed to win any honours his story endeared people to him and he became a crowd favourite. He was made deputy captain in 1948 and suffered from malaria in 1949 and 1950, as a consequence of his earlier internment. Early in the 1955 season, his career with West Ham came to an end after he was transferred to Ipswich Witches but his season was ended early through injury.

In 1956, Byford joined the Oxford Cheetahs for the 1956 Speedway National League Division Two season. He once again became a crowd favourite at the Cowley Stadium, became the club captain and rode for Oxford for five years. In November 1956, he was travelling in a car (with fellow Oxford teammates in South Africa) that crashed and killed rider Terry Courtnell.

Byford's next club was Exeter Falcons, with whom he had been doubling up with in 1961 and during his second season with them he finally won an honour, helping Exeter win the 1962 Provincial Knockout Cup. In 1965, he returned to London to join the Hackney Hawks for the new British League season before finishing his career with King's Lynn Stars from 1966 to 1967.
