= Jack Biggs =

Australian motorcycle speedway rider

- Born: 21 March 1922; Melbourne, Australia
- Died: 8 December 1972 (aged 50); Bendigo, Australia
- Nationality: Australian

Career history
- 1947–1948, 1951–1954: Harringay Racers
- 1949–1950: Odsal Boomerangs/Bradford Tudors
- 1955: West Ham Hammers
- 1956, 1958–1959: Poole Pirates
- 1957, 1960–1962: Oxford Cheetahs
- 1960: Ipswich Witches
- 1963–1964: Coventry Bees
- 1965–1966: Newport Wasps
- 1967: Cradley Heathens
- 1967–1970: Hackney Hawks

Individual honours
- 1951: Speedway World Championship bronze medal
- 1950, 1951, 1953, 1954: Speedway World Championship finalist
- 1949 (silver) 1950 (bronze): Australian Championship
- 1948, 1954: Victorian State Champion

Team honours
- 1952: National Trophy Winner
- 1948: Anniversary Cup
- 1952, 1953: London Cup
- 1953: Coronation Cup

Jack Edward Biggs (21 March 1922 – 8 December 1972) was a speedway rider from Australia.

== Speedway career ==
Biggs was a leading speedway rider in the 1950s. He reached the final of the Speedway World Championship on four occasions including finishing third in 1951 Individual Speedway World Championship.

Biggs won four medals at the Australian Championship and he rode in the top tier of British Speedway from 1947 to 1970, riding for various clubs.

Before the 1951 season, Harringay Racers signed Biggs from Bradford Tudors for £1,000, in a deal that also saw the exchange of Arthur Bush and Alf Viccary.

Biggs was killed during a track accident on 8 December 1972 at Bendigo's Golden City Speedway.

== World Final Appearances ==
=== Individual World Championship ===
- 1950 – (England) London, Wembley Stadium – 15th – 3pts
- 1951 – (England) London, Wembley Stadium – 3rd – 12pts + 1pt
- 1953 – (England) London, Wembley Stadium – 16th – 2pts
- 1954 – (England) London, Wembley Stadium – 9th – 6pts
- 1957 – (England) London, Wembley Stadium – Reserve – Did not ride

== See also ==
- Rider deaths in motorcycle speedway
