= Bradford Dukes =

British motorcycle speedway team

Club information
- Track address: Odsal Stadium; Odsal Top; Bradford; West Yorkshire
- Country: England
- Founded: 1946
- Closed: 1997

Club facts
- Colours: Blue Red and White
- Track size: 357 metres (390 yd)

Major team honours
League Champions	1997
Knockout Cup winners	1991, 1992; 1993, 1995
BSPA Cup Winner	1991
Gold Cup Winner	1990

The Bradford Dukes were a British motorcycle speedway team which operated primarily from the Odsal Stadium in Odsal, Bradford until their closure in 1997. The Bradford speedway team previously raced at Odsal Stadium under various other names Odsal Boomerangs, Odsal Tudors, Bradford Tudors, Bradford Panthers, Bradford Northern, Bradford Barons and finally Bradford Dukes.

== History ==
=== Origins, 1940s & Boomerangs ===
Odsal Stadium was first used in 1945 by the Bradford speedway team

During 1939, Bradford Northern Rugby league club's Harry Hornby and the local MP H Hepworth investigated the possibility of introducing speedway racing in Odsal, but the outbreak of World War II put an end to their plans. However, in 1945 Hornby joined together with Johnnie Hoskins, to reactive the plans and on 23 June 1945 before a crowd of over 20,000 the Lord Mayor, Alderman Cecil Barnett, officially opened the track.

The first season was a series of open and challenge meetings before league racing was introduced in 1946, with the new team called the Odsal Boomerangs (because of the sport's Australian roots). The Boomerangs competed in the six strong National League (the highest league). All tracks, with the exception of Odsal, had staged speedway in the pre-war years. Odsal featured on 2 April 1946 in the first post war league meeting, when they won 45-39 at Wimbledon. The first season was marred when on 6 July 1946, a crowd of 34,0000 at Odsal Stadium witnessed the Boomerangs lose to Belle Vue Aces. During the match promising Huddersfield born junior Albert 'Aussie' Rosenfeld, son of Albert Rosenfeld hit the fence and was taken to St Luke's Hospital, Bradford, with a suspected fractured skull. He died 10 days later, on 16 July 1946. This accident was followed a week later by a further crash which ended the career of the veteran rider Colin Watson. It resulted in the sports governing body, the Speedway Control Board, issuing an ultimatum that the Odsal track shape be changed or its licence would be withdrawn. This resulted in the square corners disappearing and a more typical oval shape emerging.

The post war period was a boom time for speedway, and other sports, as fans flocked to stadiums throughout the country. Crowds of over 20,000 were regular at Odsal, the average in 1946 being 31,000, the high point was the 47,050 who saw England defeat Australia 65-43 on 5 July 1947, a figure that remains the highest crowd for a speedway meeting at Odsal. At the end of the 1948 season, Odsal finished bottom of the league and Johnnie Hoskins resigned, due to his speedway interests in Scotland. Hoskins was replaced on the board of directors by Bruce Booth, Hornby’s nephew, and Eric Langton, the former Belle Vue rider who finished runner up in the first world championship in 1936.

=== Tudors & 1950s ===
On 1 July 1950 in the league match against the West Ham Hammers, 48-year-old veteran rider Joe Abbott fell in his second race and was hit by a following rider and was instantly killed. The riders and promoters decided to carry on with the meeting, as they believed Joe would have wished it. Fans left Odsal unaware that Joe, nicknamed the Ironman, had died. On the same night at Odsal's sister track The Shay, the Halifax Dukes, were riding at Norwich and Jock Sheard, born in the same Burnley street as Abbott, crashed in his second race and was killed. At the end of July 1950 the team changed its nickname to the Tudors. At the time it was said that the name change was due to the riders hating the Boomerang nickname, or maybe they believed that a change of name would herald a change of fortune following the events of 1 July. Sheet music exists for a song - Boom Boom Boomerangs - written especially for the speedway team.

The Tudors of 1951 repeated the feat of the Boomerangs of 1948 and finished bottom of the National League. One bright spot was Arthur Forrest, a local rider who was the product of the Monday night training school, finished third in the 1956 world final. With the decreasing attendances it was not a surprise that at the end of the 1956 season that it was announced that league racing would not be staged at Odsal in 1957.

In 1957 former riders Oliver Hart, Ron Clarke and Ron Mason took over as promoters and staged a number of open meetings and when in August, the Birmingham Brummies withdrew from the National League as a result of internal speedway politics, Clarke and Mason took over their remaining fixtures riding as the Bradford (the Odsal name was dropped) Tudors.

=== Panthers & 1960s ===
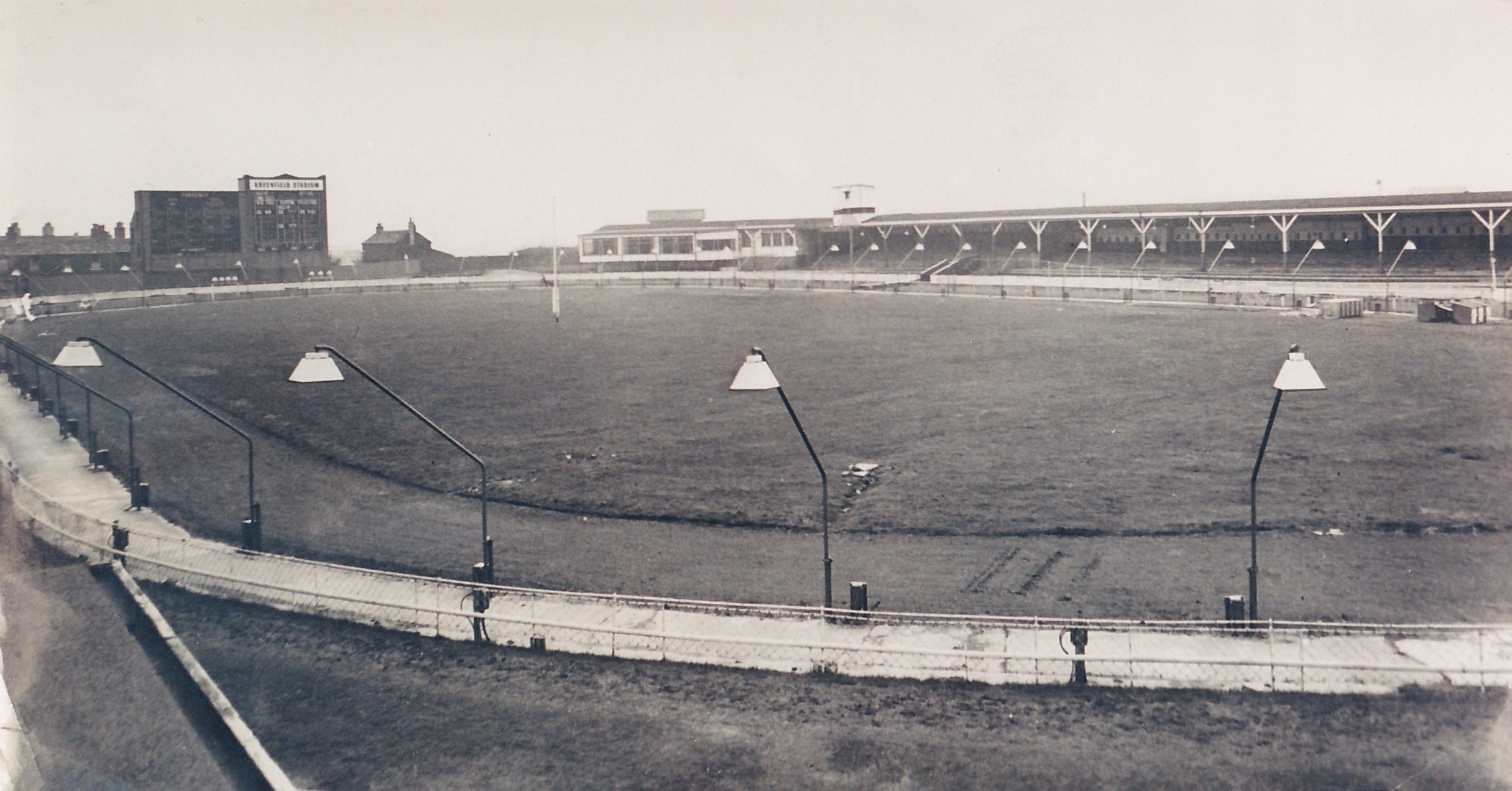
The Panthers raced at Greenfield Stadium in 1961 and 1962

In 1960 the Provincial League was formed and Jesse Halliday of the Bradford Speedway and Sports Promotions applied to the Speedway Control Board for a team called the Panthers to race at Odsal. The season was disastrous, with the Panthers finishing bottom of the 1960 Provincial Speedway League with only two points. The following season in 1961, the Panthers moved to Greenfield Stadium, partly due to issues over removing the corners of the rugby pitch at Odsal on race days. Speedway did not return to Odsal for a decade.

The Panthers moved to Greenfield Stadium in 1961, a popular greyhound racing venue. The opening meeting was scheduled for 17 July 1961, but due to heavy flooding, construction of the speedway track inside the greyhound track had been delayed. The contractors commenced work on 18 June, with 900 tons of earth removed and a base of 400 tons of clinker laid, with 240 tons of track dressing finishing the works. As the works overran, the Bradford riders were loaned to Middlesbrough and Newcastle. The stadium was quite small but had held a crowd of 20,000 at one time. The main stand on the School Street side opposite the starting gate had no seating and was covered terracing only. The back straight on the Cutler Heights side had another area of covered terracing. At one end was a huge tote board with no terracing and at the other end the concourse was built up slightly overlooking the dog track with betting windows and a club house. The pits area and car park were in the corner at this end. It was considered a better stadium for speedway racing than Odsal at the time. With a crowd of two thousand people at Greenfield Stadium it produced an atmosphere whereas two thousand people at Odsal would hardly be noticeable.

Finally on 15 August 1961, former promoter Johnnie Hoskins ceremonially opened the new track. Around 2,500 spectators saw the Sheffield Tigers defeat the Panthers 47-30 in a challenge match. The Panthers club colours of blue and yellow were not seen under the new floodlights until late in the season as the commissioning was delayed. Meetings had to begin in the early evening and as a result attendances suffered and promoter Jess Halliday left the club at the end of the 1961 season.

In 1962, Mike Parker and Eddie Glennon took over the reins and tried to spark some life into what was by now clearly a desperate situation. The Panthers first meeting of the new season was a 44-52 loss to the Poole Pirates, it set the trend, a mere five of 24 meetings resulted in a Bradford victory. Fixed firmly to the bottom of the league the last meeting at Greenfield Stadium was a double header against Sheffield and Leicester on Tuesday 9 October 1962. Ironically the largest crowd of the season saw a rare Bradford victory. It did not stop the Panthers folding soon after.

=== 1970s Bradford Northern & Barons ===
In June 1970, halfway through the Division Two season, promoters Les Whaley, Mike Parker and Bill Bridgett moved the Nelson Admirals team across the Pennines to resurrect speedway to Bradford as the Bradford Northern speedway team. The team spent four years in the Division Two before changing name yet again for the 1974 season, when they would be known as the Barons. The team achieved a second place finish during the 1971 British League Division Two season, which was their best to date, with Alan Knapkin recording a 10.17 season average.

Alan Knapkin took over the team for the 1974 season but on 17 July 1974 it was announced that the promoting rights had been sold again, this time to Shipley newsagent and long time Bradford speedway fan Jim Streets. At the end of the season the team once again finished in 7th position. In 1975 the New National League (formerly division 2) was formed but crowd levels continued to fall, especially following the introduction of stock cars and the resulting damage to the track. Even the return of Alan Knapkin to the team on 25 June didn't improve the situation as the team finished in 11th position. It was therefore of little surprise that shortly after the Barons had defeated Stoke and Mildenhall in a double header on 1 October it was announced that speedway would not take place at Odsal in 1976. However, Jim Streets did not give up without a fight and attempted unsuccessfully to introduce speedway at the former home of Bradford (Park Avenue) Football Club. Noise tests and team line up plans were made but eventually he was forced to withdraw.

=== 1980s ===
Speedway returned to Odsal in 1985 after a ten-year absence, when it was selected by the Fédération Internationale de Motocyclisme to host the 1985 Speedway World Championship. Bradford Council were quick to seize on the prestige of being associated with a World event and approved £1 million project to refurbish the Odsal Stadium. A 40,000 crowd attended at the final.

In March 1986, Odsal opened its doors to top league speedway (British League) for the first time since the 1950s after the Halifax Dukes were offered a new home track. The new 'Bradford Dukes' team included Kenny Carter and two leading prospects Gary Havelock and Neil Evitts but the team finished 7th in the league during a season marred by the murder-suicide committed by leading rider Kenny Carter.

=== 1990s ===
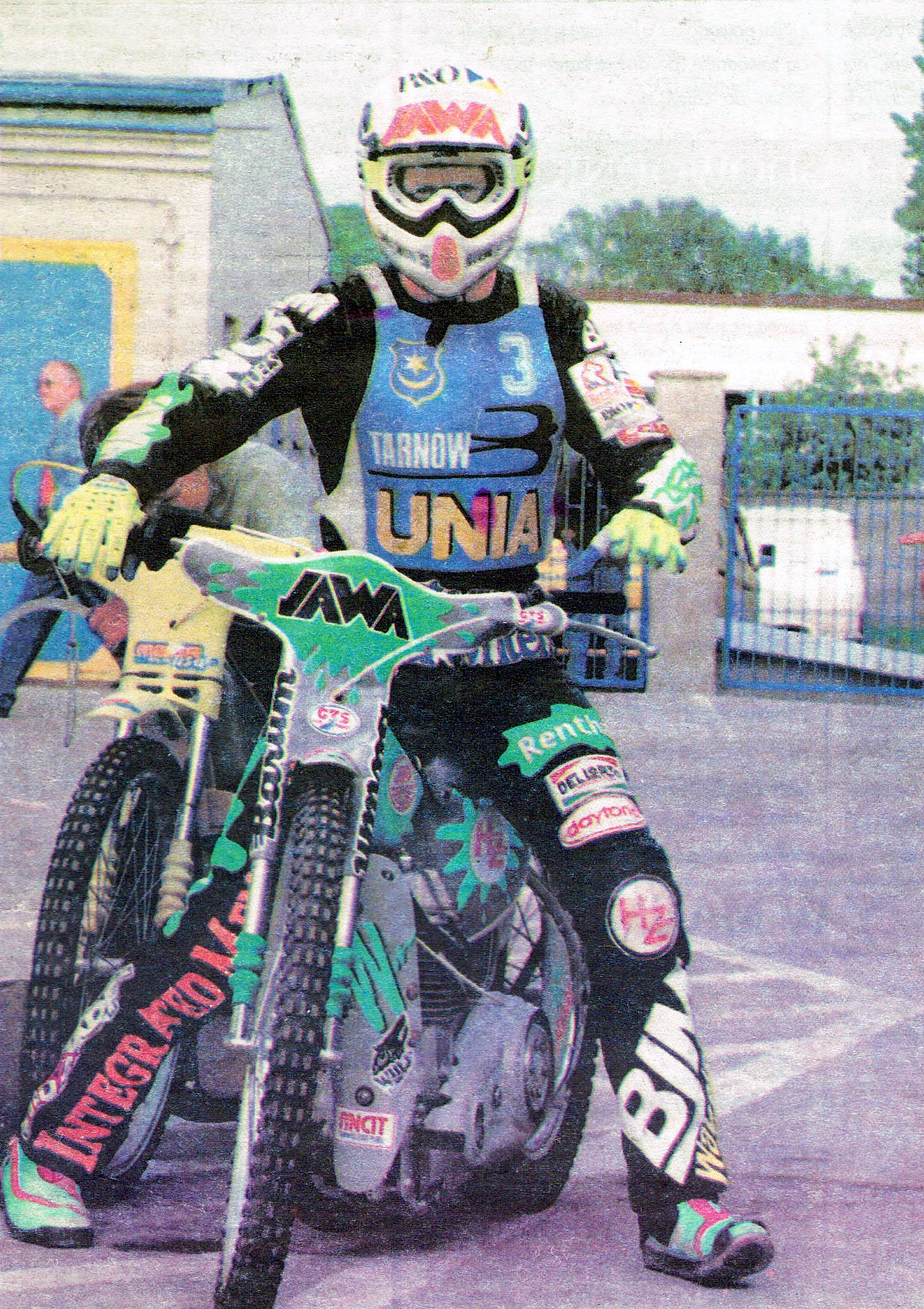
Simon Wigg

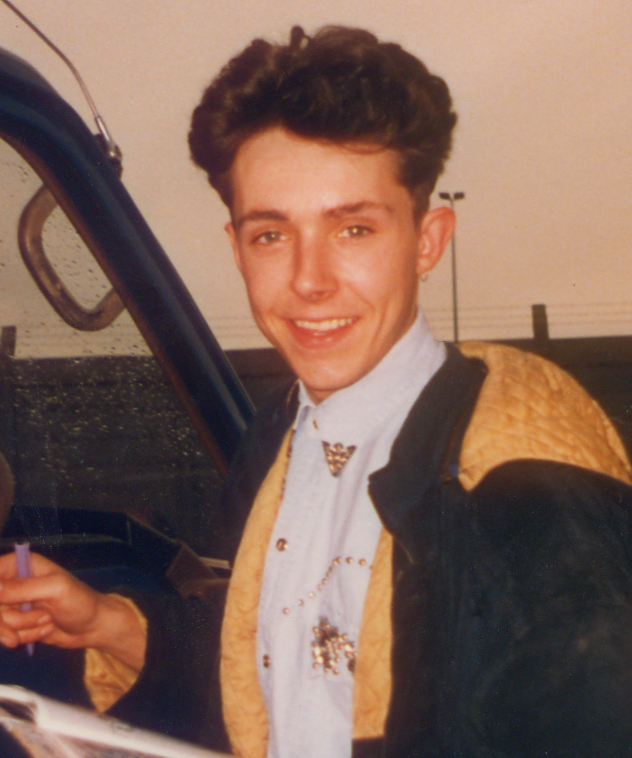
Gary Havelock

The Dukes enjoyed their best season to date in 1991, when they finished runner-up behind Wolverhampton Wolves in the league and won the Knockout Cup for the first major trophy in their history. Multi-British Champion Simon Wigg and Gary Havelock were instrumental during the season. The following season in 1992, Havelock became Speedway World Champion whilst a Bradford rider The 1992 season also saw a repeat of a second place finish in the league and a second Knockout Cup success. Kelvin Tatum (a double British champion) assisted Wigg an Havelock throughout the season.

In 1993 Bradford lost Wigg to Coventry but brought in Jimmy Nilsen and achieved a third consecutive Knockout Cup title win. Two years later during the merged Premier League, the Dukes won another Knockout Cup and finished league runner-up for the third time.

Going into the 1997 season the Dukes signed Mark Loram to support number 1 rider Joe Screen and Gary Havelock. The team finally won the Elite League, 11 points clear at the top of the table. Despite becoming British champions for the first time the club closed after the 1997 season due to financial losses incurred by promoters Bobby and Allan Ham, which was soon followed by news of a potential redevelopment of Odsal.

=== Post 1997 ===
In 2013 businessman Tony Mole successfully applied for planning permission to again use Odsal for speedway, with the possibility of racing returning in 2014 with the Bradford and Halifax Dukes. However, the return did not materialise.

== Season summary ==
Extended content

Year and league	Position	Notes
1946 Speedway National League	3rd	Boomerangs
1947 Speedway National League	4th	Boomerangs
1948 Speedway National League	7th	Boomerangs
1949 Speedway National League	5th	Boomerangs
1950 Speedway National League	6th	changed name to Tudors mid-season
1951 Speedway National League	9th	Tudors
1952 Speedway National League	9th	Tudors
1953 Speedway National League	4th	Tudors
1954 Speedway National League	3rd	Tudors
1955 Speedway National League	4th	Tudors
1956 Speedway National League	7th	Tudors
1957 Speedway National League	7th	returned mid-season replacing Birmingham Brummies
1960 Provincial Speedway League	10th	Panthers
1962 Provincial Speedway League	13th	Panthers
1970 British League Division Two season	4th	Northern
1971 British League Division Two season	2nd	Northern
1972 British League Division Two season	11th	Northern
1973 British League Division Two season	7th	Northern
1974 British League Division Two season	7th	Barons
1975 New National League season	11th	Barons
1986 British League season	6th	
1987 British League season	5th	
1988 British League season	11th	
1989 British League season	9th	
1990 British League season	5th	
1991 British League season	2nd	Knockout Cup winners
1992 British League season	2nd	Knockout Cup winners
1993 British League season	7th	Knockout Cup winners
1994 British League season	7th	
1995 Premier League speedway season	2nd	Knockout Cup winners
1996 Premier League speedway season	11th	
1997 Elite League speedway season	1st	Champions

== Notable riders ==
- (England) Joe Abbott
- (Australia) Jack Biggs
- (England) Nigel Boocock
- (England) Kenny Carter
- (England) Ron Clarke
- (Australia) Glenn Doyle
- (England) Neil Evitts
- (England) Arthur Forrest
- (Australia) Max Grosskreutz
- (England) Oliver Hart
- (England) Gary Havelock
- (England) Alan Knapkin
- (Australia) Bill Longley
- (England) Mark Loram
- (England) Colin Meredith
- (Sweden) Jimmy Nilsen
- (England) Dent Oliver
- (England) Eddie Rigg
- (England) Joe Screen
- (England) Andy Smith
- (England) Alec Statham
- (England) Kelvin Tatum
- (England) Paul Thorp
- (England) Simon Wigg

== See also ==
- Category:Bradford Dukes riders
- List of defunct motorcycle speedway teams in the United Kingdom
