= Freddie Williams (speedway rider) =

Welsh motorcycle speedway rider (1926-2013)

- Freddie Williams in 1950
- Born: 12 March 1926; Port Talbot, Wales
- Died: 20 January 2013 (aged 86); Swindon, England
- Nationality: British (Welsh)

Career history
- 1947–1956: Wembley Lions

Individual honours
- 1950, 1953: World Champion

Team honours
- 1949, 1950, 1951, 1952, 1953: National League Champion
- 1948, 1954: National Trophy winner
- 1948, 1949, 1950, 1951, 1954: London Cup

Frederick Owen Williams (12 March 1926 – 20 January 2013) was a motorcycle speedway rider from Wales who was World Champion on two occasions. He was the winner of the Speedway World Championship in 1950 and 1953 and runner-up in 1952. With no Welsh team to represent, he earned 28 international caps for the England national speedway team.

== Career ==
Williams grew up in Port Talbot, where he was a classmate of Richard Burton, and they played together in the school rugby team. In 1941 he moved to Portsmouth where he started an apprenticeship in the dockyards as an engineer-fitter. He was a despatch rider in World War II, and began his speedway career as the war ended, after initially competing in grasstrack. After attending training sessions at Rye House, he was signed by Alec Jackson for the Wembley Lions and in 1948 got a regular place in the team after injuries to George Wilks and Bill Kitchen.

Williams rode for the Wembley Lions for his entire career, from 1947 until 1956. Williams became the first British rider to win two World titles (in 1950 and 1953), a feat only matched by Peter Craven (in 1955 and 1962) and Tai Woffinden (2013, 2015, 2018).

Williams represented England in test match series, gaining his first cap in 1949.

In 1953, Williams married Olympic skater Pat Devries. His two younger brothers, Ian Williams and Eric Williams, were also speedway riders, and Freddie acted as Ian's mechanic at the 1957 World Final.

Williams presented the winner's trophy to Australian rider Chris Holder at the 2012 Speedway Grand Prix of Great Britain held at the Millennium Stadium in Cardiff. Like Williams, Holder would go on to become the World Champion at the end of the 2012 Speedway Grand Prix season. Williams finished second behind (Jack Young in the 1952 World Final at Wembley Stadium.

Williams died on 20 January 2013, aged 86, in the Great Western Hospital in Swindon following a stroke the previous day.

Williams is the only Welshman, to win speedway's ultimate individual prize.

== World Final appearances ==
- 1950 - (England) London, Wembley Stadium - Winner - 14pts
- 1951 - (England) London, Wembley Stadium - 9th - 7pts
- 1952 - (England) London, Wembley Stadium - 2nd - 13pts
- 1953 - (England) London, Wembley Stadium - Winner - 14pts
- 1954 - (England) London, Wembley Stadium - Res - Did not ride

== Grasstrack racing ==
- Southern Centre Champion 1948.
