= Fred Brand =

British motorcycle speedway rider

- Born: 3 February 1925; Spalding, Lincolnshire
- Died: 2 December 2016 (aged 91)
- Nationality: British (English)

Career history
- 1949-1953: Yarmouth Bloaters
- 1954-1956: Norwich Stars

Individual honours
- 1954: Speedway World Championship finalist

Team honours
- 1955: National Trophy Winner

Charles Frederick Brand (1925–2016) was an English speedway rider.

== Speedway career ==
Brand trialled as a novice for Norwich Stars in 1949 before signing for Yarmouth Bloaters. He rode for Yarmouth in the British speedway leagues from 1949 to 1953, where he earned the nickname the "Master of Caister Road". He signed for Norwich after the teams agreed a transfer fee of £1,100 in March 1954, despite competition from West Ham Hammers for his signature.

Brand reached the final of the Speedway World Championship in the 1954 Individual Speedway World Championship.

== World final appearances ==
=== Individual World Championship ===
- 1954 - (England) London, Wembley Stadium - 8th - 7pts
