= Peter Moore (speedway rider) =

Australian speedway rider

- Born: 28 April 1929; Melbourne, Australia
- Died: 14 May 1996 (aged 67)
- Nationality: Australian

Career history
- 1950: St Austell Gulls
- 1951-1952, 1965: Long Eaton Archers
- 1952-1956, 1959: Wimbledon Dons
- 1957-1958, 1960-1962: Ipswich Witches
- 1959: Norwich Stars
- 1962-1963: Swindon Robins
- 1965: Long Eaton Archers
- 1966-1967: King's Lynn Stars
- 1973: Rayleigh Rockets
- 1973: Hackney Hawks
- 1974: Rye House Rockets

Individual honours
- 1956, 1958, 1959, 1960, 1963: Speedway World Championship finalist

Team honours
- 1954, 1955, 1956, 1959: National League Champion
- 1953, 1956, 1959: National Trophy Winner
- 1954: RAC Cup
- 1959: Britannia Shield

Peter John Moore (28 April 1929 – 14 May 1996) was an international motorcycle speedway rider from Australia. He earned 22 international caps for the Australia national speedway team and 3 caps for the Great Britain national speedway team.

== Speedway career ==
Moore was a leading rider throughout the 1950s and 1960s, he reached the final of the Speedway World Championship on five occasions in 1956, 1958, 1963, 1959, 1960 and 1963.

Moore gained 22 Australian caps and three British caps (when riders from Oceania were allowed to represent Britain).

After a first British season with St Austell Gulls in 1950, Moore signed for Long Eaton Archers. He rode in the top tier of British Speedway from 1950 to 1974, riding for various clubs. His time riding in Britain included winning three consecutive league titles from 1954 to 1956, with the famous Wimbledon Dons team of the 1950s.

== World Final Appearances ==
=== Individual World Championship ===
- 1956 - (England) London, Wembley Stadium - 9th - 8pts
- 1958 - (England) London, Wembley Stadium - 11th - 5pts
- 1959 - (England) London, Wembley Stadium - 15th - 3pts
- 1960 - (England) London, Wembley Stadium - 4th - 12pts
- 1963 - (England) London, Wembley Stadium - 11th - 6pts

=== World Team Cup ===
- 1963 - (Austria) Vienna, Stadion Wien (with Peter Craven / Dick Fisher / Barry Briggs) - 3rd - 25pts (1)

Note: Moore rode for Great Britain in the World Team Cup
