= Eric French =

British motorcycle speedway rider

- Born: 4 August 1913; Cork, Ireland
- Died: 17 February 1974 (aged 60); Surrey, England
- Nationality: British/Irish

Career history
- 1938-1939: Wimbledon Dons
- 1946-1953: New Cross Rangers
- 1953-1956: Wembley Lions
- 1957: Rayleigh Rockets
- 1958: Poole Pirates

Team honours
- 1948, 1953: National League Champion
- 1954: National Trophy winner
- 1947, 1954: London Cup winner

Eric French (4 August 1913 – 17 February 1974) was an Irish-born motorcycle speedway rider, in the 1930s and 1940s, and represented the England national speedway team in test matches.

== Biography ==
Born in Ireland, French moved with his parents to England before he was one year old. The family settled in Tadworth, Surrey. He began grasstrack racing in 1935, winning several trophies. While grasstrack racing in 1938, he was spotted by former Wimbledon rider Claude Rye, who arranged for French to try out for the Dons, and he was taken on as a junior. In 1939, he rode in the Wimbledon Dons team at reserve, before his career was interrupted by World War II.

French worked at an aircraft factory in Weybridge during the war, and did not race again until 1945. After practising at Rye House, he signed for New Cross Rangers in 1946. He scored nine points in his first match for New Cross, and established himself as a regular team member during the 1946 season, scoring at an average of 5.10.

French spent four years with Wembley Lions from 1953 to 1956, winning the 1953 league title and the 1954 National Trophy and London Cup double.

French finished runner-up to Alec Statham in the London Riders' Championship in 1949 after a run-off. He appeared in the 1949 film Once a Jolly Swagman, for which the racing scenes were shot at New Cross.

=== Test career ===
French rode in the England team in the 1949 test series against Australia, scoring three points in the third test at New Cross and seven points in the fourth test at Harringay. In 1950, he rode in all five test matches, scoring 6, 8, 0, 9, and 5. He was not selected in 1951 but returned for the fourth test at New Cross in 1952, scoring 5 points. At retirement, he had earned 10 international caps for England.
