= Eddie Rigg =

British motorcycle speedway rider

- Born: 5 December 1919; Burnley, England
- Died: February 1991 (aged 71); Perth, Australia
- Nationality: British (English)

Career history
- 1947-1956: Odsal Boomerangs/Tudors
- 1957-1958: Belle Vue Aces

Individual honours
- 1951: Brandonapolis

Team honours
- 1957, 1958: Britannia Shield winner
- 1958: National Trophy winner

Edward Rigg (5 December 1919, Burnley, England — February 1991, Perth, Australia) was an international speedway racer who finished twice finished seventh in the Speedway World Championship final. He earned 14 international caps for the England national speedway team.

== Career ==
Rigg started his career with the Odsal Boomerangs, where he stayed for the following ten seasons. In 1957, he joined the Belle Vue Aces and won his only domestic team trophies, the Britannia Shield in 1957 and the National Trophy, at the end of his final season in 1958.

== World Final Appearances ==
- 1951 - (England) London, Wembley Stadium - 7th - 8pts
- 1954 - (England) London, Wembley Stadium - 7th - 7pts
