= Arthur Forrest (speedway rider) =

British motorcycle speedway rider

- Forrest in 1951
- Born: 5 January 1932; Bradford, England
- Died: January 2000 (aged 68); North Yorkshire, England
- Nationality: British (English)

Career history
- 1949–1951: Halifax Dukes
- 1952–1957: Bradford Tudors
- 1958–1959: Coventry Bees

Team honours
- 1950: National Trophy (Div 2) Winner

Arthur Forrest (5 January 1932 in Bradford, England – January 2000) was an international motorcycle speedway who qualified for the Speedway World Championship finals five times. He earned 26 international caps for the England national speedway team.

== Career summary ==
Forrest started his career with the Halifax Dukes in the 1949 National League Division Three. In his opening season aged just seventeen, he scored nineteen maximums (unbeaten by an opponent) from fifty meetings. The following season the Dukes rode in National League Division Two, but Forrest carried on from the previous season, actually raising his average. Whilst with the Dukes, he was called up to ride for England at only eighteen years of age. After a third season with the Dukes in 1951, he joined hometown club, the Bradford Tudors in 1952.

The Tudors competed in National League Division One and Forrest rode so well he became top of the teams averages, and qualified for the first of his five World final appearances. He remained with the Tudors until 1957 before joining the Coventry Bees, but his career seemed to have already peaked in 1956 when he finished in third place of the Speedway World Championship after beating Peter Craven in a run off.

At the end of the 1959 season, Forrest retired from speedway at only twenty six years of age.

== World final appearances ==
- 1952 – (England) London, Wembley Stadium – 9th – 7pts
- 1953 – (England) London, Wembley Stadium – 8th – 7pts
- 1954 – (England) London, Wembley Stadium – 10th – 5pts
- 1955 – (England) London, Wembley Stadium – 9th – 7pts
- 1956 – (England) London, Wembley Stadium – 3rd – 11pts + 3pts
