= Alan Hunt (speedway rider) =

British motorcycle speedway rider

- Born: 25 July 1924; Aston, England
- Died: 2 February 1957 (aged 32); Johannesburg, South Africa
- Nickname: Whacker
- Nationality: British (English)

Career history
- 1947-1950: Cradley Heathens
- 1951-1956: Birmingham Brummies

Team honours
- 1953, 1954, 1955: Midland Cup

Alan Hunt (25 July 1924 – 2 February 1957) was an international motorcycle speedway rider who qualified for the Speedway World Championship final four times. He earned 26 caps for the England national speedway team and three caps for the South African national speedway team.

== Career ==
Hunt attended Tiger Stevensons training school in the winter of 1946-47 and impressed so much he was given the reserve berth with the Cradley Heath Cubs for the 1947 season, who were competing in the National League Division Three. After his fourth season with the Heathens, Hunt was averaging over ten points per meeting and it was not surprising that he was attracting the attention of top-flight teams.

In 1951, the Harringay Racers thought they had a deal with the Heathens to sign Hunt on a full transfer but at the last moment the Birmingham Brummies promotion took over the Heathens and transferred Hunt to them.

In his first season at Birmingham, Hunt qualified for the World Final but only manage two points. It signalled the start of his dislike of the Wembley track although it was similar to the Cradley Heath track he learnt his speedway skills on. With Birmingham he won three consecutive Midland Cups from 1953 to 1955.

Hunt was also selected to ride for England national speedway team, the highlight being a six ride, six win maximum against the Australia national speedway team in 1956.

== World Final appearances ==
- 1951 - (England) London, Wembley Stadium - 16th - 2pts
- 1953 - (England) London, Wembley Stadium - 14th - 3pts
- 1954 - (England) London, Wembley Stadium - Res - Did not ride
- 1956 - (England) London, Wembley Stadium - 11th - 6pts

== Death ==
On 1 February 1957, Hunt was riding in a meeting in South Africa, where he was planning on emigrating and only living in the UK during the speedway season, when he fell and was hit by the machine of the following rider, fracturing his skull. He was rushed to hospital but died in the early hours of 2 February. He was only 31 years old.

== See also ==
Rider deaths in motorcycle speedway
