= 1937 Provincial Speedway League =

British motorcycle speedway season

- League: Provincial League
- No. of competitors: 6
- Champions: Bristol Bulldogs
- Provincial Trophy: Nottingham
- National Trophy (provincial final): Southampton Saints
- Coronation Cup: Nottingham
- Highest average: Frank Goulden
- Division/s above: 1937 National League

The 1937 Provincial Speedway League was the second season of the Provincial League. Seven speedway teams started the season. From the previous season's finishers, Plymouth Panthers had dropped out but Leicester, Birmingham (Hall Green) and Norwich Stars joined up. Leicester withdrew mid-season and their record was expunged. Liverpool Merseysiders also withdrew mid-season but their entry was taken over by Belle Vue. Bristol Bulldogs were the champions and moved up to the National League for the following season.

Due to the brevity of the season, teams also competed for the Provincial Trophy in a league format. Leicester had already folded before the competition started and as with the league, Belle Vue replaced Liverpool Merseysiders. Nottingham won the Provincial Trophy and completed a double by winning the Provincial League Coronation Cup.

Stan Hart was killed during a match at Hall Green Stadium between Birmingham and Belle Vue on 25 August. He fell during a heat and was hit by a rider behind.

== Final table ==
Pos	Team	M	W	D	L	Pts
1	Bristol Bulldogs	20	15	0	5	30
2	Southampton Saints	20	13	0	7	26
3	Nottingham	20	11	0	9	22
4	Liverpool Merseysiders+ Belle Vue Merseysiders+	20	8	0	12	16*
5	Norwich Stars	20	8	0	12	16
6	Birmingham Bulldogs	20	5	0	15	10

M = Matches; W = Wins; D = Draws; L = Losses; Pts = Total Points

+ Liverpool scored 10 points from 11 matches, Belle Vue scored 6 from 9

Withdrawal (Record expunged) : Leicester Hounds

== Fixtures & results ==
=== A fixtures ===
Home \ Away	BIR	BRI	LEI	LBV	NOR	NOT	SOU
Birmingham		39–44	39–45	41–40	39–44	26–57	30–53
Bristol	48–34		68–15	58–25	64–18	49–31	45–36
Leicester	47–33	23–57		n/a	n/a	n/a	n/a
Liverpool/Belle Vue	58–26	29–55	44–35		30–54	42–30	37–46
Norwich	48–35	27–54	57–27	48–34		28–49	37–47
Nottingham	51–31	42–40	65–19	31–53	60–24		54–30
SOU	57–26	46–38	33–7	43–41	59–22	44–40	

Legend: Blue = home team win; Yellow = draw; Red = away team win.

=== B fixtures ===
Home \ Away	BIR	BRI	LBV	NOR	NOT	SOU
Birmingham		38–45	53–31	55–28	44–39	60–24
Bristol	50.5–33.5		59–24	60–23	48–35	55–28
Liverpool/Belle Vue	54–27	31–52		44–35	46–37	49–35
Norwich	50–34	44–39	48–34		46–37	46–37
Nottingham	50–33	45–35	58–26	53–31		45–38
SOU	59–25	52–31	53–30	61–22	44–38	

Legend: Blue = home team win; Yellow = draw; Red = away team win.

== Leading averages (league only) ==
Rider	Team	Average
Frank Goulden	Southampton	10.46
George Greenwood	Nottingham	9.55
Bert Jones	Southampton	9.21
Bill Rogers	Bristol	9.15
Billy Dallison	Southampton	9.15

== Provincial Trophy final table ==
Pos	Team	M	W	D	L	Pts
1	Nottingham	10	7	0	3	14
2	Bristol Bulldogs	10	6	1	3	13
3	Southampton Saints	10	6	0	4	12
4	Liverpool Merseysiders+ Belle Vue Merseysiders+	10	4	0	6	8
5	Birmingham (Hall Green)	10	3	1	6	7
6	Norwich Stars	10	3	0	7	6

M = Matches; W = Wins; D = Draws; L = Losses; Pts = Total Points

+ Liverpool scored 2 points from 6 matches, Belle Vue scored 6 from 4

== National Trophy ==
The 1937 National Trophy was the seventh edition of the Knockout Cup. Southampton Saints won the Provincial Final round and therefore qualified for the quarter finals proper (the round when the tier one sides entered the competition).

=== Provincial League first qualifying round ===
Date	Team one	Score	Team two
03/05	Liverpool	57-26	Norwich
01/05	Norwich	30-51	Liverpool

=== Provincial League second qualifying round ===
Date	Team one	Score	Team two
23/04	Bristol	48-36	Nottingham
20/04	Nottingham	rain	Bristol
04/05	Nottingham	46-37	Bristol
31/05	Liverpool	39-45	Southampton
25/05	Southampton	55-28	Liverpool

=== Final ===
First leg

4 June 1937

Bristol Bulldogs Roy Dook 7 Fred Leavis 7 Bill Rogers 6 Harry Shepherd 5 George Saunders 5 Rol Stobart 4 Bill Maddern 4 Jack Dalton 3	41 – 42	Southampton Saints Billy Dallison 9 Bert Jones 9 Syd Griffiths 8 Frank Goulden 7 Ivor Creek 3 Jack Riddle 3 Cyril Anderson 3 Vic Collins 0

Knowle Stadium

Second leg

8 June 1937

Southampton Saints Billy Dallison 12 Syd Griffiths 12 Bert Jones 9 Ivor Creek 7 Frank Goulden 4 Vic Collins 3 Cyril Anderson 2 Jack Riddle 2	51 – 32	Bristol Bulldogs Roy Dook 7 Harry Shepherd 6 Rol Stobart 5 Bill Rogers 5 Fred Leavis 4 George Saunders 4 Bill Maddern 1 Jack Dalton 0

Banister Court Stadium

Southampton were the National Trophy Provincial Final winners, winning on aggregate 93-73.

== Coronation Cup ==
The 1937 Coronation Cup was a one-off competition to mark the Coronation of George VI and Elizabeth. Nottingham won the Cup.

First round

Team one	Team two	scores
Bristol	Norwich	53–29, 47–35 (100–64 agg)
Southampton	Liverpool	41–42, 48–35 (89–77 agg)

Semifinals

Team one	Team two	scores
Nottingham	Bristol	55–29, 37–47 (92–76 agg)
Southampton	Birmingham	80–28, 40–41 (120–69 agg)

=== Final ===
Team one	Team two	scores
Nottingham	Southampton	61–23, 37–46 (98–69 agg)

== Riders & final averages ==
Birmingham

- (England) Malcolm Craven 8.00
- (England) Les Bowden 7.88
- (England) Tiger Hart 7.41
- (Australia) Steve Langton 7.42
- (England) Danny Lee 7.38
- (England) Bob Lovell 6.17
- (England) Jack Tidbury 5.33
- (England) Les Gregory 5.00
- (England) Bill Stanley 4.77
- (South Africa) Keith Harvey 4.15
- (Australia) Jack Hyland 3.00
- (England) Charlie Challis 2.20

Bristol

- (Australia) Bill Rogers 9.15
- (England) Roy Dook 9.01
- (England) Harry Shepherd 9.00
- (England) Rol Stobbart 8.73
- (England) Reg Vigor 8.67
- (England) Fred Leavis 7.25
- (Australia) Bill Maddern 6.75
- (England) Reg Lambourne 5.92
- (England) Jack Dalton 6.40
- (England) Reg Gore 5.50
- (England) George Saunders 5.42

Liverpool/Belle Vue

- (England) Jack Hargreaves 8.88/8.88
- (England) Thomas Arthur Price 7.73/7.63
- (England) Stan Hart 7.00/7.61
- (England) Eric Blain 6.97/6.57
- (England) Oliver Hart 6.86/6.92
- (England) Ernie Price 6.00/6.89
- (England) Charlie Oates 6.00/4.57
- (England) Alan Butler 4.43/5.31
- (England) Jack Gordon x/3.73
- (England) Len Eyre 5.00/4.14
- (England) Eric Butler 4.27/3.65

Norwich

- (England) Wal Morton 8.87
- (Australia) Bert Spencer 8.64
- (Australia) Dick Wise 7.79
- (England) Wilf Jay 6.65
- (England) Alex Peel 5.69
- (England) Paul Goodchild 5.39
- (England) Chun Moore 5.14
- (Scotland) Jock Sweet 4.87
- (England) Charlie Dugard 4.62
- (England) Jim Millward 4.34
- (England) Bill Birtwell 4.00
- (England) Alan Brooks Smith 3.89
- (England) Charlie Lish 3.73

Nottingham

- (England) George Greenwood 9.55
- (England) Ted Bravery 8.43
- (England) Fred Strecker 8.40
- (England) Frank Hodgson 8.21
- (England) Tommy Allott 7.95
- (England) Tommy Bateman 7.53
- (England) George Dykes 6.36
- (England) Sam Marsland 6.25
- (England) Fred Tuck 6.21
- (Australia) Billy Lamont 5.69
- (Australia) Don Hemingway 1.60

Southampton

- (England) Frank Goulden 10.46
- (Australia) Bert Jones 9.21
- (England) Billy Dallison 9.15
- (Wales) Syd Griffiths 9.01
- (England) Jack Riddle 8.38
- (New Zealand) Jack Hobson 6.14
- (England) Ivor Creek 4.85
- (England) Cyril Anderson 4.94
- (England) Jim Boyd 3.50
- (England) Vic Collins 3.29

== See also ==
- List of United Kingdom Speedway League Champions
- Knockout Cup
