= 1949 Speedway National League Division Two =

British motorcycle speedway season

- League: National League Division Two
- No. of competitors: 12
- Champions: Bristol Bulldogs
- National Trophy (Div 2 final): Bristol Bulldogs
- Highest average: Bruce Semmens
- Division/s above: National League (Div 1)
- Division/s below: National League (Div 3)

The 1949 National League Division Two was the fourth post-war season of the second tier of motorcycle speedway in Great Britain.

== Summary ==
The League was extended to 12 teams with the addition of new entrants Walthamstow Wolves and Ashfield Giants. Coventry Bees, Southampton Saints and Cradley Heath moved up from Division Three, with Cradley changing their nickname from Cubs to Heathens in the process. Two sides were missing from those that finished the previous season. Birmingham Brummies moved up to Division One and Middlesbrough Bears dropped out, although the promotion and most of their riders moved to the renamed Newcastle Magpies whose riders and promotion in turn had moved to Ashfield

The Division Two Anniversary (League) Cup was discontinued as the expanded league programme gave the teams 44 league fixtures. Bristol Bulldogs retained their title.

== Final table ==
Pos	Team	PL	W	D	L	Pts
1	Bristol Bulldogs	44	34	1	9	69
2	Sheffield Tigers	44	29	1	14	59
3	Norwich Stars	44	27	0	17	54
4	Cradley Heath Heathens	44	25	0	19	50
5	Edinburgh Monarchs	44	24	0	20	48
6	Walthamstow Wolves	44	21	3	20	45
7	Southampton Saints	44	21	3	20	45
8	Glasgow Tigers	44	20	0	24	40
9	Fleetwood Flyers	44	18	1	25	37
10	Newcastle Magpies	44	17	1	26	35
11	Ashfield Giants	44	12	1	31	25
12	Coventry Bees	44	10	1	33	21

== Fixtures & results ==
=== A fixtures ===
Home \ Away	ASH	BRI	COV	CH	ED	FLE	GLA	NEW	NOR	SHE	SOT	WAL
Ashfield		38–46	45–39	45–38	39–45	45–39	35–46	52–32	50–34	40–43	40–41	48–36
Bristol	63–21		67.5–16.5	62–22	68–16	61–22	62–22	60–24	66–18	55–29	56–27	60–24
Coventry	38–45	35–48		42–40	44–39	35–49	45–39	47–37	53–31	32–50	42–42	45–39
Cradley	48–36	34–50	59–25		54–30	50–34	56–27	49–35	45–38	61–23	48–34	52–32
Edinburgh	57–27	40–44	53–31	44–40		45–39	43–41	52–32	43–40	34–49	54–29	45–39
Fleetwood	45–39	46–38	53–29	46–38	57–27		38–46	47–37	30–53	51–33	48–36	54–30
Glasgow	52–32	27–57	59–25	54–30	50–34	68–16		53–31	48–36	45–39	64–20	52–32
Newcastle	54–30	29–55	53–31	60–23	49–34	45–39	43–40		37–46	47–36	53–31	41–43
Norwich	48–36	52–32	67–16	58–26	58–25	58–26	57–27	59–24		46–38	61–23	57–25
Sheffield	52–31	49–35	58–26	50–34	49–35	60–24	59–25	48–36	34–50		69–15	56–27
Southampton	50–34	45–39	55–28	37.5–43.5	50–31	41–42	43–41	45–39	55–29	41–41		52–29
Walthamstow	44–39	46–37	67–17	45–39	58–26	42–42	48–34	48–36	40–43	40.5–43.5	41–41	

Legend: Blue = home team win; Yellow = draw; Red = away team win.

=== B fixtures ===
Home \ Away	ASH	BRI	COV	CH	ED	FLE	GLA	NEW	NOR	SHE	SOT	WAL
Ashfield		42–42	54–30	33–51	39–45	45–38	51–33	51–33	34–50	41–43	37–47	53–31
Bristol	63–21		52–29	53–31	60–24	67–17	70–14	60–24	68–16	65–19	55–26	51–33
Coventry	55–29	38–46		36–48	38–46	46–38	32.5–30.5	40–44	38–45	35–47	36–47	36–47
Cradley	57–27	54–30	53–31		50–34	44–40	59–25	51–33	56–27	60–24	49–35	57–27
Edinburgh	51–33	44–40	45–37	57–27		58–26	61–23	54–29	55–29	45–39	58–26	61–22
Fleetwood	52–30	39–44	53–31	64–18	35–49		56–28	53–31	35–49	46–38	49–35	41–43
Glasgow	49–35	35–49	35–49	51–33	48–34	51–33		51–32	47–36	45–39	58–26	39–45
Newcastle	54–29	28–56	56–28	42–41	59–25	49–35	49–34		48–36	30–54	50–33	42–42
Norwich	64–20	45–39	62–22	41–43	61–23	48–34	58–26	63–21		41–43	61–23	56–28
Sheffield	57–26	56–28	58–26	49–35	63–21	43–40	68–16	48–36	48–36		57–27	48–36
Southampton	45–39	41–42	54–30	52–32	53–31	51–33	52–32	47–37	44–40	50–34		42–41
Walthamstow	54–29	35–49	49–35	54–30	53–31	62–21	56–27	50–34	55–28	52–32	51–32	

Legend: Blue = home team win; Yellow = draw; Red = away team win.

== Top Five Riders (League only) ==
	Rider	Nat	Team	C.M.A.
1	Bruce Semmens	(England)	Sheffield	10.47
2	Billy Hole	(England)	Bristol	10.11
3	Jack Mountford	(England)	Bristol	9.75
4	Roger Wise	(England)	Bristol	9.56
5	Alan Hunt	(England)	Cradley Heath	9.45

== National Trophy Stage Two ==
- For Stage One - see Stage One
- For Stage Three - see Stage Three

The 1949 National Trophy was the 12th edition of the Knockout Cup. The Trophy consisted of three stages; stage one was for the third division clubs, stage two was for the second division clubs and stage three was for the top-tier clubs. The winner of stage one would qualify for stage two and the winner of stage two would qualify for the third and final stage. Bristol won stage two and therefore qualified for stage three.

Second Division qualifying first round

Date	Team one	Score	Team two
07/06	Glasgow Ashfield	53-55	Cradley Heath
03/06	Cradley Heath	56-52	Glasgow Ashfield
15/06	Glasgow White City	67-41	Norwich
18/06	Norwich	71-36	Glasgow White City
22/06	Fleetwood	69-38	Stoke Hanley
18/06	Stoke Hanley	56-52	Fleetwood
17/06	Bristol	73-35	Sheffield
16/06	Sheffield	53-55	Bristol
31/05	Southampton	52-56	Walthamstow
30/05	Walthamstow	63-44	Southampton

Second Division Qualifying Second round

Date	Team one	Score	Team two
25/06	Coventry	42-66	Bristol
24/06	Bristol	80-28	Coventry
02/07	Edinburgh	57-51	Fleetwood
29/06	Fleetwood	61-44	Edinburgh
02/07	Norwich	78-30	Newcastle
27/06	Newcastle	64-41	Norwich
24/06	Cradley Heath	66-41	Walthamstow
20/06	Walthamstow	64-39	Cradley Heath
08/07 replay	Cradley Heath	71-37	Walthamstow
04/07 replay	Walthamstow	62-44	Cradley Heath

Second Division Qualifying semifinals

Date	Team one	Score	Team two
23/07	Norwich	70.5-37.5	Cradley Heath
22/07	Cradley Heath	67-41	Norwich
13/07	Fleetwood	46-60	Bristol
08/07	Bristol	73-35	Fleetwood

=== Final ===
First leg

29 July 1949

Bristol Bulldogs Jack Mountford 18 Billy Hole 16 Eric Salmon 12 Roger Wise 11 Johnny Hole 10 Mike Beddoe 7 Dick Bradley 5 Chris Boss 0	79 – 29	Norwich Stars Phil Clarke 8 Bob Leverenz 6 Jack Freeman 5 Fred Rogers 4 Bert Spencer 3 Ted Bravery 2 Alec Hunter 1 Syd Littlewood 0

Knowle Stadium

Second leg

30 July 1949

Norwich Stars Phil Clarke 18 Bob Leverenz 14 Ted Bravery 12 Bert Spencer 11 Fred Rogers 8 Syd Littlewood 8 Jack Freeman 4 Johnny Davies 1	76 – 32	Bristol Bulldogs Roger Wise 7 Jack Mountford 6 Billy Hole 6 Mike Beddoe 4 Dick Bradley 3 Eric Salmon 3 Johnny Hole 3 Graham Hole 0

The Firs Stadium

== Riders & final averages ==
Ashfield

- (Australia) Ken Le Breton 9.33
- (Australia) Merv Harding 8.85
- (Australia) Keith Gurtner 7.56
- (England) Alec Grant 4.96
- (England) Norman Evans 4.62
- (Australia) Gruff Garland 4.15
- (England) Norman Johnson 3.66
- (Scotland) Willie Wilson 3.65
- (England) Rol Stobbart 3.18
- (Scotland) Eric Liddell 3.18

Bristol

- (England) Billy Hole 10.11
- (England) Jack Mountford 9.75
- (England) Roger Wise 9.56
- (England) Eric Salmon 9.19
- (England) Fred Tuck 9.00
- (England) Mike Beddoe 7.51
- (England) Johnny Hole 6.31
- (England) Dick Bradley 5.40
- (Wales) Chris Boss 4.14
- (England) Graham Hole 3.56

Coventry

- (England) Bob Fletcher 7.70
- (England) Derrick Tailby 6.35
- (England) Bert Lacey 6.30
- (England) Les Wotton 5.91
- (Australia) Lionel Levy 5.76
- (Australia) Les Hewitt 5.63
- (England) Jack Gordon 5.00
- (England) John Yates 4.79
- (England) Roy Moreton 4.32
- (England) Johnny Reason 4.00
- (England) Ed Pye 3.83
- (England) Jack Winstanley 3.74
- (England) John Duncan White 3.17

Cradley Heath

- (England) Alan Hunt 9.45
- (Wales) Eric Williams 8.59
- (Australia) Jack Arnfield 7.35
- (England) Gil Craven 7.23
- (England) Roy Moreton 6.72
- (England) Geoff Godwin 5.76
- (England) Bill Clifton 5.64
- (England) Les Tolley 5.63
- (England) Phil Malpass 5.56
- (England) Les Beaumont 5.52
- (England) Ray Beaumont 4.21

Edinburgh

- (Australia) Jack Young 9.04
- (New Zealand) Dick Campbell 8.81
- (England) Eddie Lack 7.59
- (Australia) Clem Mitchell 6.98
- (England) Dennis Parker 6.35
- (England) Don Cuppleditch 5.77
- (England) Danny Lee 5.35
- (England) Harold Fairhurst 5.04
- (Australia) Keith Cox 4.
- (Scotland) Bill Baird 3.66
- (Scotland) Bert Shearer 3.
- (England) Nobby Downham 3.
- (England) Tommy Lack 2.05

Fleetwood

- (England) Wilf Plant 8.67
- (England) Cyril Cooper 8.45
- (England) George Newton 8.12
- (England) Norman Hargreaves 8.85
- (England) Ernie Appleby 6.14
- (England) Brian Wilson 4.96
- (England) Don Potter 4.00
- (Australia) Frank Malouf 3.95
- (England) Ron Hart 3.59
- (England) Fred Yates 3.14
- (Australia) Percy Day 3.06
- (England) Larry Young 2.90

Glasgow

- (Australia) Bat Byrnes 8.35
- (Australia) Junior Bainbridge 8.17
- (England) Joe Crowther 8.00
- (England) Will Lowther 7.51
- (England) Jack Hodgson 7.20
- (Scotland) Gordon McGregor 6.40
- (England) Harold Fairhurst 5.95
- (Australia) Norman Lindsay 5.93
- (Australia) Buck Ryan 5.08
- (England) Nobby Downham 4.83
- (Scotland) Alf McIntosh 3.71
- (Scotland) Ken McKinlay 2.64
- (Scotland) Billy Bates 2.40

Newcastle

- (England) Derick Close 8.12
- (England) Frank Hodgson 8.10
- (England) Jack Hodgson 7.91
- (England) Wilf Jay 7.12
- (England) Herby King 5.61
- (England) Son Mitchell 5.57
- (England) Ernie Brecknell 5.13
- (England) Joe Arthur 3.77
- (Australia) Don Lawson 3.48

Norwich

- (England) Paddy Mills (Horace Burke) 8.96
- (England) Phil Clarke 8.81
- (Australia) Bob Leverenz 8.26
- (Australia) Bert Spencer 7.22
- (England) Ted Bravery 7.20
- (England) Jack Freeman 7.11
- (England) Fred Rogers 6.94
- (Australia) Syd Littlewood 6.37
- (England) Johnny Davies 5.70
- (Australia) Alec Hunter 5.02
- (England) Bill Codling 3.37

Sheffield

- (England) Bruce Semmens 10.47
- (England) Stan Williams 9.29
- (England) Len Williams 8.70
- (England) Tommy Allott 8.59
- (Australia) Andy Menzies 6.27
- (England) Tommy Bateman 6.09
- (Australia) Jack Chignell 5.94
- (Australia) Jack Bibby 5.77
- (England) Guy Allott 4.98
- (England) Alf Parker 4.47
- (England) Ralph Horne 3.62

Southampton

- (England) Bob Oakley 8.24
- (England) Jimmy Squibb 7.30
- (England) Cecil Bailey 7.12
- (England) Roy Craighead 6.71
- (Wales) Tom Oakley 5.95
- (England) Phil Bishop 4.91
- (Australia) Bill Rogers 4.87
- (England) Bill Griffiths 4.74
- (New Zealand) Bill Thatcher 3.67
- (England) Alf Kaines 3.23

Walthamstow

- (England) Jim Boyd 9.10
- (England) Wilf Jay 8.11
- (England) Charlie May 8.07
- (England) Benny King 7.52
- (England) Harry Edwards 6.50
- (England) Reg Reeves 6.39
- (England) Arch Windmill 5.92
- (Australia) Harold Bull 5.78
- (England) Bill Osborne 5.39
- (England) Dick Geary 5.27
- (Australia) Ted Argall 2.59

== See also ==
- List of United Kingdom Speedway League Champions
- Knockout Cup (speedway)
