= 1936 Speedway National League =

British speedway league season

- League: National League Division One
- No. of competitors: 7
- Champions: Belle Vue Aces
- National Trophy: Belle Vue Aces
- A.C.U Cup: Belle Vue Aces
- London Cup: Hackney Wick Wolves
- Highest average: Jack Parker
- Division/s below: 1936 Provincial League

The 1936 National League Division One was the eighth season of the highest tier of motorcycle speedway in Great Britain.

== Summary ==
The entrants were the same seven teams as the previous season. Harringay's Jack Parker topped the rider averages but was injured for the inaugural World Championship Final won by Wembley's Lionel van Praag on his home track.

Belle Vue Aces won their fourth consecutive national title and Knockout Cup and third treble after winning the A.C.U Cup.

== Final table ==
Pos	Team	PL	W	D	L	Pts
1	Belle Vue Aces	24	18	1	5	37
2	Wembley Lions	24	14	0	10	28
3	Harringay Tigers	24	12	0	12	24
4	Wimbledon Dons	24	12	0	12	24
5	Hackney Wick Wolves	24	11	0	13	22
6	New Cross Tamers	24	9	0	15	18
7	West Ham Hammers	24	7	1	16	15

== Fixtures & results ==
A fixtures

Home \ Away	BV	HAC	HAR	NC	WEM	WH	WIM
Belle Vue		47–25	47–24	45–27	41–30	53–19	43–29
Hackney	44–21		42–29	26–44	30–42	43–28	51–19
Harringay	32–40	51–21		40–32	39–33	50–22	39–33
New Cross	35–37	39–30	34–38		28–43	43–29	35–36
Wembley	32–40	43–29	44–28	47–25		43–28	33–38
West Ham	37–34	27–44	33–37	49–22	27–45		32–40
Wimbledon	30–38	37–33	32–40	40–31	34–37	44–27	

Legend: Blue = home team win; Yellow = draw; Red = away team win.

B fixtures

Home \ Away	BV	HAC	HAR	NC	WEM	WH	WIM
Belle Vue		47–25	50–22	36–32	45–27	36–36	55–17
Hackney	32–39		41–31	32–40	30–42	48–24	46–26
Harringay	42–30	34–38		38–33	45–26	31–38	51–21
New Cross	43–27	43–29	44–26		42–30	43–28	35–37
Wembley	37–34	28–44	43–29	36–35		43–28	34–38
West Ham	27–44	33–38	49–23	44–28	34–37		52–20
Wimbledon	27–44	37–34	42–29	40–31	35–36	33–37	

Legend: Blue = home team win; Yellow = draw; Red = away team win.

== Top Ten Riders ==
	Rider	Nat	Team	C.M.A.
1	Jack Parker	(England)	Harringay	10.27
2	Max Grosskreutz	(Australia)	Belle Vue	10.21
3	Frank Charles	(England)	Wembley	10.11
4	Lionel van Praag	(Australia)	Wembley	9.45
5	Eric Langton	(England)	Belle Vue	9.27
6	Joe Abbott	(England)	Belle Vue	9.25
7	Bluey Wilkinson	(Australia)	West Ham	9.21
8	Bill Kitchen	(England)	Belle Vue	8.91
9=	Dicky Case	(Australia)	Hackney	8.71
9=	Jack Ormston	(England)	Harringay	8.71

== National Trophy ==
The 1936 National Trophy was the sixth edition of the Knockout Cup.

=== Qualifying rounds ===
Southampton Saints won the Provincial final and therefore secured a place in the quarter-finals.

Quarterfinals

Date	Team one	Score	Team two
13/06	Belle Vue	68-40	West Ham
13/06	Wimbledon	42-65	Wembley
12/06	Hackney Wick	65-42	New Cross
11/06	Wembley	61-47	Wimbledon
10/06	New Cross	55-51	Hackney Wick
09/06	West Ham	43-65	Belle Vue
04/06	Southampton	30-41	Harringay

Semifinals

Date	Team one	Score	Team two
30/07	Wembley	54-53	Belle Vue
25/07	Belle Vue	78-30	Wembley
18/07	Harringay	55-52	Hackney Wick
17/07	Hackney Wick	58-50	Harringay

=== Final ===
First leg

21 August 1936

Hackney Wick Wolves Dicky Case 14 Cordy Milne 12 Morian Hansen 10 Baltzer Hansen 9 George Wilks 8 Bill Clibbett 6	59 – 49	Belle Vue Aces Max Grosskreutz 18 Bob Harrison 16 Bill Kitchen 11 Eric Langton 3 Wally Hull 1 Frank Varey 0 Oliver Langton 0 Acorn Dobson 0

Hackney Wick Stadium

Second leg

22 August 1936

Belle Vue Aces Max Grosskreutz 18 Bill Kitchen 15 Eric Langton 12 Bob Harrison 12 Frank Varey 9 Wally Hull 6 Oliver Langton 1	73 – 31	Hackney Wick Wolves Dicky Case 12 Cordy Milne 9 Baltzer Hansen 3 Morian Hansen 2 George Wilks 2 Bill Clibbett 1 Stan Dell 1

Hyde Road

Belle Vue were National Trophy Champions, winning on aggregate 122-90.

== A.C.U Cup ==
The 1936 Auto-Cycle Union Cup was the third edition of the Cup and was won by Belle Vue for the third time. Tragically Herbert 'Dusty' Haigh was killed instantly after suffering a facrtured skull riding at Hackney Wick Stadium on 15 May 1936, in the ACU Cup match between Hackney and West Ham. He fell when in front and heading for a fourth consecutive heat win and the riders behind were unable to avoid him.

First round

Group 1

Team	PL	W	D	L	Pts
Belle Vue Aces	6	5	0	1	10
Harringay Tigers	6	4	0	2	8
West Ham Hammers	6	2	0	4	4
Hackney Wick Wolves	6	1	0	5	2

Group 2

Team	PL	W	D	L	Pts
Wembley Lions	4	4	0	0	8
New Cross Tamers	4	1	0	3	2
Wimbledon Dons	4	0	0	4	0

Group 1

Home \ Away	BV	HAC	HAR	WH
Belle Vue		65–30	53–41	60–35
Hackney	38–57		45–51	57–39
Harringay	45–51	51–44		61–35
West Ham	56–40	63–32	38–57	

Legend: Blue = home team win; Yellow = draw; Red = away team win.

Group 2

Home \ Away	NC	WEM	WIM
New Cross		37–59	51–45
Wembley	54–42		59–37
Wimbledon	47–4	45–49	

Legend: Blue = home team win; Yellow = draw; Red = away team win.

Final

Date	Team one	Team two	Score
16/07	Wembley	Belle Vue	48–47
18/07	Belle Vue	Wembley	51–44

== London Cup ==
First round

Team one	Score	Team two
Harringay	65–43, 71–37	Wimbledon
New Cross	67–41, 50–58	West Ham

Semi final round

Team one	Score	Team two
New Cross	54–52, 43–63	Hackney Wick
Wembley	60–47, 44–63	Harringay

=== Final ===
First leg

26 September 1936

Harringay Jack Ormston 16 Les Wotton 11 Bill Pitcher 10 Norman Parker 8 Harry Whitfield 3 Rol Stobart 1	49–58	Hackney Wick Cordy Milne 17 Baltzer Hansen 11 Morian Hansen 9 Bill Clibbett 8 George Wilks 7 Stan Dell 3 Dick Case 3

Harringay Stadium

Second leg

2 October 1936

Hackney Wick Morian Hansen 17 Dick Case 15 Cordy Milne 12 Baltzer Hansen 12 George Wilks 7 Bill Clibbett 5 Stan Dell 1	69–39	Harringay Bill Pitcher 12 Jack Ormston 9 Norman Parker 9 Frank Goulden 7 Billy Dallison 1 Les Wotton 1

Hackney Wick Stadium

Hackney Wick won on aggregate 127–88

== Riders & final averages ==
Belle Vue

- (Australia) Max Grosskreutz 10.21
- (England) Eric Langton 9.27
- (England) Joe Abbott 9.25
- (England) Bill Kitchen 8.92
- (England) Bob Harrison 6.81
- (England) Frank Varey 5.33
- (England) Acorn Dobson 5.11
- (England) Oliver Langton 4.00
- (England) Tommy Allott 3.06
- (England) Wally Hull 2.07
- (England) Chun Moore 1.00

Hackney

- (England) Dusty Haigh 10.00
- (Australia) Dicky Case 8.71
- (United States) Cordy Milne 7.95
- (Denmark) Morian Hansen 7.87
- (Denmark) Baltzer Hansen 5.57
- (England) George Wilks 5.35
- (England) Bill Clibbett 4.93
- (England) Broncho Dixon 4.57
- (England) Stan Dell 4.00
- (Australia) Fred Tate 3.62
- (England) Tiger Hart 2.74

Harringay

- (England) Jack Parker 10.27
- (England) Jack Ormston 8.71
- (England) Bill Pitcher 7.32
- (England) Norman Parker 7.06
- (Australia) Dick Smythe 4.97
- (England) Les Wotton 4.79
- (England) Rol Stobbart 4.20
- (England) Billy Dallison 3.73
- (England) Fred Strecker 3.33
- (England) Bob Lovell 1.33

New Cross

- (United States) Jack Milne 8.68
- (England) George Newton 8.54
- (England) Stan Greatrex 8.24
- (England) Ron Johnson 7.73
- (England) Joe Francis 6.00
- (England) Norman Evans 4.88
- (England) Nobby Key 3.57
- (England) Harry Shepherd 3.05
- (England) Roy Dook 2.53
- (Australia) Ernie Evans 0.62

Wembley

- (England) Frank Charles 10.11
- (Australia) Lionel Van Praag 9.45
- (England) Ginger Lees 8.00
- (New Zealand) Wally Kilmister 5.08
- (England) Eric Gregory 5.02
- (England) Wally Lloyd 4.08
- (England) Gordon Byers 5.30
- (England) Tommy Price 4.00
- (England) George Greenwood 3.33

West Ham

- (Australia) Bluey Wilkinson 9.21
- (England) Tommy Croombs 7.37
- (England) Broncho Dixon 7.05
- (England) Arthur Atkinson 6.80
- (Canada) Eric Chitty 5.90
- (England) Tiger Stevenson 4.23
- (England) Rol Stobbart 3.76
- (England) Phil Bishop 3.73
- (England) Ken Brett 3.64
- (Australia) Mick Murphy (John Glass) 3.58
- (Australia) Charlie Spinks 3.33

Wimbledon

- (Australia) Vic Huxley 8.13
- (England) Wal Phillips 7.50
- (England) Claude Rye 6.46
- (England) Gus Kuhn 5.97
- (Australia) Eric Collins 5.23
- (England) Wal Morton 4.89
- (England) Geoff Pymar 4.79
- (Australia) Jack Sharp 4.49

== See also ==
- List of United Kingdom Speedway League Champions
- Knockout Cup (speedway)
