= 1939 Speedway National League =

British speedway league season

- League: National League Division One
- Champions: None
- No. of competitors: 7
- National Trophy: Belle Vue Aces & Wembley Lions
- London Cup: Wimbledon Dons
- British Speedway Cup: Belle Vue Aces
- Highest average: Cordy Milne
- Division/s below: National League (Div 2)

The 1939 National League Division One was an eleventh and unfinished season of the highest tier of motorcycle speedway in Great Britain.

== Summary ==
Southampton Saints had moved up from Division Two and Bristol Bulldogs moved back down after just one season.

Belle Vue Aces were leading the championship ahead of Wimbledon Dons when the league was abandoned due to the outbreak of World War II .

== Table at the outbreak of war ==
Team	PL	W	D	L	Pts
Belle Vue Aces	16	12	1	3	25
Wimbledon Dons	18	12	0	6	24
Wembley Lions	19	11	1	8	23
West Ham Hammers	19	9	0	10	18
Harringay Tigers	16	7	1	8	15
Southampton Saints	17	5	0	12	10
New Cross Rangers	19	4	1	14	9

== Fixtures & results ==
A fixtures

Home \ Away	BV	HAR	NC	SOT	WEM	WH	WIM
Belle Vue		46–35	54–30	61–23	57–27	45–39	44–40
Harringay	n/a		43–40	53–31	36–48	44–40	48–36
New Cross	42–42	34–50		56–28	42–40	41–42	38–45
Southampton	38–45	39–45	48–35		46–38	47–37	n/a
Wembley	50–34	42–42	52–31	57–27		55–29	53–30
West Ham	40–42	44–39	50–33	54–30	36–48		44–39
Wimbledon	50–34	46–37	52–32	53–31	51–33	48–36	

Legend: Blue = home team win; Yellow = draw; Red = away team win.

B fixtures

Home \ Away	BV	HAR	NC	SOT	WEM	WH	WIM
Belle Vue		54–30	56–27	n/a	n/a	63–21	n/a
Harringay	n/a		n/a	55–29	n/a	37–46	39–44
New Cross	n/a	n/a		n/a	n/a	43–40	35–49
Southampton	40–44	55–29	51.5–32.5		n/a	n/a	n/a
Wembley	43–41	n/a	59–24	61–22		58–26	39–45
West Ham	n/a	n/a	45–38	n/a	53–31		44–38
Wimbledon	n/a	n/a	41–42	56–26	44–40	n/a	

Legend: Blue = home team win; Yellow = draw; Red = away team win.

== Top Ten Riders at the outbreak of war ==
	Rider	Nat	Team	C.M.A.
1	Cordy Milne	(United States)	Southampton	11.29
2	Wilbur Lamoreaux	(United States)	Wimbledon	11.06
3	Bill Kitchen	(England)	Belle Vue	10.88
4	Vic Duggan	(Australia)	Wimbledon	10.67
5	Arthur Atkinson	(England)	West Ham	10.62
6	Lionel van Praag	(Australia)	Wembley	10.62
7	Jack Milne	(United States)	New Cross	10.00
8	Jack Parker	(England)	Harringay	9.6
9	Eric Langton	(England)	Belle Vue	9.5
10	Jimmy Gibb	(Canada)	West Ham	8.58

== National Trophy ==
The 1939 National Trophy was the ninth edition of the Knockout Cup. Wembley and Belle Vue were declared joint winners following the abandonment of the final fixture due to the outbreak of the war.

=== Qualifying rounds ===
Sheffield Tigers won the Division Two final and therefore secured a place in the quarter-finals.

Quarterfinals

Date	Team one	Score	Team two
22/07	Belle Vue	67-40	Wimbledon
17/07	Wimbledon	51-56	Belle Vue
26/07	New Cross	57-51	Harringay
22/07	Harringay	52-54	New Cross
13/07	Wembley	64-45	West Ham
11/07	West Ham	62-46	Wembley
20/07	Sheffield	61-46	Southampton
26/07	Southampton	68-36	Sheffield

Semifinals

Date	Team one	Score	Team two
26/08	Belle Vue	80-28	New Cross
16/08	New Cross	44-64	Belle Vue
31/08	Wembley	74-33	Southampton
30/08	Southampton	62-46	Wembley

=== Final ===
Date	Team one	Score	Team two
16/09	Wembley	not held	Belle Vue
21/09	Belle Vue	not held	Wembley

== British Speedway Cup ==
Team	PL	W	D	L	Pts	+/-
Belle Vue Aces	10	7	0	3	16	+95
West Ham Hammers	10	7	0	3	16	+87
Harringay Tigers	10	5	1	4	13	+25
New Cross Rangers	10	5	1	4	12	+28
Wimbledon Dons	10	5	0	5	11	+26
Southampton Saints	10	0	0	10	0	-261

Home \ Away	BV	HAR	NC	SOT	WH	WIM
Belle Vue		65–31	58–38	63–33	59–36	53–43
Harringay	45–51		58–37	74–24	54–42	56–39
New Cross	51–43	47–47		68–28	60–36	59–37
Southampton	43–53	38–58	38–58		42–53	45–50
West Ham	53–41	57–39	60–36	69–26		66–30
Wimbledon	57–39	65–30	58–37	65–31	46–48	

Legend: Blue = home team win; Yellow = draw; Red = away team win.

== London Cup ==
First round

Team one	Score	Team two
Wimbledon	71–37, 42–64	Harringay

Semi final round

Team one	Score	Team two
West Ham	56–50, 50–57	New Cross
Wembley	55–52, 49–59	Wimbledon

Final

First leg

5 July 1939

New Cross Jack Milne 11 Ron Johnson 10 Ray Duggan 7 Joe Francis 6 Bill Longley 5 Stan Greatrex 4 Crocky Rawding 2 Goldy Restall 1	46–62	Wimbledon Wilbur Lamoreaux 15 Vic Duggan 13 Eric Collins 11 Geoff Pymar 10 Wally Lloyd 8 Nobby Key 2 Eric French 2 Norman Evans 1

New Cross Stadium

Second leg

10 July 1939

Wimbledon Wilbur Lamoreaux 18 Eric Collins 14 Geoff Pymar 11 Vic Duggan 10 Nobby Key 7 Wally Lloyd 6 Norman Evans 5 Eric French 1	72–36	New Cross Jack Milne 13 Ron Johnson 9 Joe Francis 4 Bill Longley 2 Stan Greatrex 2 Goldy Restall 2 Crocky Rawding 2 Ray Duggan 2

Plough Lane

Wimbledon won on aggregate 134–82

== Riders & final averages ==
Belle Vue

- (England) Bill Kitchen 10.88
- (England) Eric Langton 9.50
- (England) Frank Varey 7.50
- (England) Ernie Price 7.08
- (England) Bob Harrison 6.64
- (England) Joe Abbott 6.62
- (England) Jack Hargreaves 6.18
- (England) Oliver Langton 5.25
- (England) Wally Hull 2.00

Harringay

- (England) Jack Parker 9.60
- (England) Alec Statham 7.79
- (England) Norman Parker 6.94
- (England) Les Wotton 6.88
- (England) Bill Pitcher 6.71
- (England) Lloyd Goffe 6.18
- (Australia) Frank Dolan 4.53
- (England) Dick Harris 4.33
- (Australia) Jack Chapman 2.00
- (England) Ron Mason 1.68

New Cross

- (United States) Jack Milne 10.00
- (England) Ron Johnson 7.97
- (England) Stan Greatrex 6.26
- (Australia) Ray Duggan 4.94
- (England) Norman Evans 4.87
- (Australia) Bill Longley 4.46
- (Canada) Goldy Restall 3.78
- (England) Joe Francis 3.52
- (Canada) Emerson Rawding 1.78

Southampton

- (United States) Cordy Milne 11.29
- (England) Frank Goulden 7.52
- (United States) Benny Kaufman 5.88
- (Wales) Syd Griffiths 4.65
- (England) Billy Dallison 4.44
- (England) Alf Kaines 2.36
- (Australia) Bert Jones 2.67
- (England) Jim Boyd 2.42
- (England) Ed Pye 1.43

Wembley

- (Australia) Lionel Van Praag 10.61
- (England) Malcolm Craven 8.32
- (Denmark) Morian Hansen 8.17
- (England) Frank Charles 7.85
- (England) Tommy Price 7.57
- (England) George Wilks 6.74
- (Australia) Aub Lawson 6.43
- (England) Cliff Parkinson 5.07
- (Australia) Andy Menzies 4.73

West Ham

- (England) Arthur Atkinson 10.46
- (Canada) Jimmie Gibb 8.58
- (Canada) Eric Chitty 7.89
- (England) Tommy Croombs 7.42
- (Australia) Charlie Spinks 4.77
- (England) Colin Watson 4.21
- (England) Phil Bishop 3.80
- (England) Tiger Stevenson 3.11
- (England) Dick Geary 1.33

Wimbledon

- (United States) Wilbur Lamoreaux 11.06
- (Australia) Vic Duggan 10.67
- (Australia) Eric Collins 8.53
- (England) Wally Lloyd 6.44
- (England) Geoff Pymar 5.73
- (England) Nobby Key 4.35
- (England) Norman Evans 3.47
- (Canada) Emerson Rawding 3.09
- (Republic of Ireland) Eric French 1.71
- (England) Fred Leavis 1.71

== See also ==
- List of United Kingdom Speedway League Champions
- Knockout Cup (speedway)
