= 1937 Speedway National League =

British speedway league season

- League: National League Division One
- No. of competitors: 7
- Champions: West Ham Hammers
- National Trophy: Belle Vue Aces
- A.C.U Cup: Belle Vue Aces
- London Cup: New Cross Rangers
- Highest average: Jack Milne
- Division/s below: 1937 Provincial League

The 1937 National League Division One was the ninth season of the highest tier of motorcycle speedway in Great Britain.

== Summary ==
The entrants were the same seven teams as the previous season.

West Ham Hammers won their first national title despite finishing bottom the previous season. In the process they stopped Belle Vue Aces from claiming a fifth consecutive title win. Belle Vue did however go on to win the cup double winning the Knockout Cup for the fifth successive year and the A.C.U Cup for the fourth successive year.

Roy Clarence Vigor (Reg Vigor) was fatally injured during a match at Wimbledon Stadium on 27 September. He hit a safety fence and his bike landed on top of him. He died in Nelson Hospital, Merton, three days later. His death came just one month after the death of Stan Hart in the 1937 Provincial Speedway League.

== Final table ==
Pos	Team	PL	W	D	L	Pts
1	West Ham Hammers	24	18	0	6	36
2	Wembley Lions	24	16	0	8	32
3	New Cross Rangers	24	16	0	8	32
4	Belle Vue Aces	24	13	0	11	26
5	Hackney Wick Wolves	24	10	0	14	20
6	Harringay Tigers	24	9	0	15	18
7	Wimbledon Dons	24	2	0	22	4

== Fixtures & results ==
A fixtures

Home \ Away	BV	HAC	HAR	NC	WEM	WH	WIM
Belle Vue		47–37	52–31	54–29	48–36	39–45	62–22
Hackney	45–39		46–37	40–42	38–46	42–41	53–31
Harringay	41–43	54–30		49–35	46–36	35–48	47–32
New Cross	46–37	44–39	47–37		49–35	56–28	55–28
Wembley	43–40	44–40	48–36	52–31		52–30	56–28
West Ham	53–31	57–25	54–28	53–30	68–16		47–37
Wimbledon	30–53	40–44	45–38	40–42	31–49	38–43	

Legend: Blue = home team win; Yellow = draw; Red = away team win.

B fixtures

Home \ Away	BV	HAC	HAR	NC	WEM	WH	WIM
Belle Vue		60–24	62–22	53–31	52–31	38–45	61–23
Hackney	44–39		43.5–38.5	43–40	34–49	49–32	54–29
Harringay	49–35	46–37		30–54	43–41	40–43	42–41
New Cross	51–33	58–26	49.5–34.5		42–41	47–37	48–35
Wembley	50–34	45–39	53–28	47–36		44–40	55–28
West Ham	43–38	52–31	59–24	55–28	49–34		65–19
Wimbledon	38–44	52–32	30–53	31–52	33–51	38–42	

Legend: Blue = home team win; Yellow = draw; Red = away team win.

== Top ten riders ==
	Rider	Nat	Team	C.M.A.
1	Jack Milne	(United States)	New Cross	11.09
2	Lionel van Praag	(Australia)	Wembley	10.53
3	Eric Langton	(England)	Belle Vue	10.18
4	Bluey Wilkinson	(Australia)	West Ham	10.14
5	Bill Kitchen	(England)	Belle Vue	9.88
6	Jack Parker	(England)	Harringay	9.71
7	Cordy Milne	(United States)	Hackney	9.38
8	Eric Chitty	(Canada)	West Ham	9.32
9	Joe Abbott	(England)	Belle Vue	8.98
10	Frank Charles	(England)	Wembley	8.96

== National Trophy ==
The 1937 National Trophy was the seventh edition of the Knockout Cup.

=== Qualifying rounds ===
Southampton Saints won the Provincial final and therefore secured a place in the quarter-finals.

Quarterfinals

Date	Team one	Score	Team two
05/06	Harringay	41-65	New Cross
09/06	New Cross	76-31	Harringay
07/06	Wimbledon	39-68	Belle Vue
12/06	Belle Vue	80-28	Wimbledon
08/06	West Ham	58-46	Hackney Wick
11/06	Hackney Wick	60-48	West Ham
25/06 replay	Hackney Wick	65-43	West Ham
29/06	Southampton	40-44	Wembley
29/06 replay	West Ham	55-53	Hackney Wick

Semifinals

Date	Team one	Score	Team two
15/07	Wembley	50-58	New Cross
14/07	New Cross	59-48	Wembley
16/07	Hackney Wick	56-52	Belle Vue
17/07	Belle Vue	69-39	Hackney Wick

=== Final ===
First leg

21 August 1937

Belle Vue Aces Frank Varey 16 Bob Harrison 15 Bill Kitchen 15 Joe Abbott 11 Eric Langton 9 Wally Hull 4	70 – 38	New Cross Rangers Jack Milne 17 George Newton 6 Ron Johnson 6 Stan Greatrex 4 Joe Francis 4 Clem Mitchell 1 Norman Evans 0 Bill Longley 0

Hyde Road

Second leg

25 August 1937

New Cross Stadium Jack Milne 18 Joe Francis 14 Ron Johnson 10 George Newton 9 Clem Mitchell 7 Stan Greatrex 3 Norman Evans 1	62 – 45	Belle Vue Aces Eric Langton 14 Joe Abbott 10 Wally Hull 10 Frank Varey 5 Bill Kitchen 4 Oliver Langton 2 Bob Harrison 0

New Cross Stadium

Belle Vue were National Trophy Champions, winning on aggregate 115-110.

== A.C.U Cup ==
The 1937 Auto-Cycle Union Cup was the fourth edition of the Cup and was won by Belle Vue for the fourth time. The groups were decided on the number of heat points scored within matches, rather than match wins.

First round

Group 1

Team	PL	W	D	L	Race Pts
Wembley Lions	6	6	0	0	319.5
New Cross Rangers	6	3	0	3	311.5
Harringay Tigers	6	3	0	3	269
Wimbledon Dons	6	0	0	6	240

Group 2

Team	PL	W	D	L	Race Pts
Belle Vue Aces	4	1	0	3	202
West Ham Hammers	4	3	0	1	190
Hackney Wick Wolves	4	2	0	2	181

Group 1

Home \ Away	HAR	NC	WEM	WIM
Harringay		52–41	44–52	47–46
New Cross	62–34		47–48	60–34
Wembley	53–42	54.5–41.5		58–38
Wimbledon	46–50	34–60	42–54	

Legend: Blue = home team win; Yellow = draw; Red = away team win.

Group 2

Home \ Away	BV	HAC	WH
Belle Vue		69–27	47–48
Hackney	52–44		62–34
West Ham	52–42	56–40	

Legend: Blue = home team win; Yellow = draw; Red = away team win.

Final

Date	Team one	Team two	Score
07/10	Wembley	Belle Vue	49–45
09/10	Belle Vue	Wembley	61–35

== London Cup ==
First round

Team one	Score	Team two
New Cross	65–43, 65–42	Wimbledon
Wembley	58–49, 61–46	Harringay

Semi final round

Team one	Score	Team two
Hackney Wick	49–59, 21–87	West Ham
New Cross	62–46, 56–50	Wembley

=== Final ===
First leg

28 September 1937

West Ham Bluey Wilkinson 14 Eric Chitty 12 Tiger Stevenson 11 Tommy Croombs 7 Arthur Atkinson 5 Charlie Spinks 2 Jack Dixon 1	52–55	New Cross George Newton 17 Jack Milne 15 Stan Greatrex 10 Joe Francis 6 Ron Johnson 6 Clem Mitchell 1 Ernie Evans 0

West Ham Stadium

Second leg

29 September 1937

New Cross Jack Milne 17 Ron Johnson 14 Stan Greatrex 11 George Newton 9 Joe Francis 6 Clem Mitchell 4 Norman Evans 1	62–45	West Ham Bluey Wilkinson 17 Arthur Atkinson 10 Eric Chitty 9 Tiger Stevenson 3 Tommy Croombs 5 Jack Dixon 1

New Cross Stadium

New Cross won on aggregate 117–97

== Riders & final averages ==
Belle Vue

- (England) Eric Langton 10.18
- (England) Bill Kitchen 9.88
- (England) Joe Abbott 9.49
- (England) Bob Harrison 8.07
- (England) Frank Varey 6.71
- (England) Wally Hull 5.33
- (England) Oliver Langton 4.39
- (England) Jack Hargreaves 4.21
- (England) Ernie Price 3.25
- (England) Harold Jackson 2.46
- (England) Acorn Dobson 2.77

Hackney

- (United States) Cordy Milne 9.38
- (Australia) Dicky Case 8.30
- (Denmark) Morian Hansen 7.63
- (England) Bill Clibbett 5.54
- (England) George Wilks 5.40
- (England) George Greenwood 5.20
- (England) Stan Dell 4.76
- (Australia) Vic Duggan 4.14
- (England) Doug Wells 3.58
- (England) Frank Hodgson 3.40
- (England) Ted Bravery 2.48
- (England) Arch Windmill 1.71

Harringay

- (England) Jack Parker 9.81
- (England) Jack Ormston 8.29
- (New Zealand) Jack Hobson 6.46
- (England) Frank Goulden 6.33
- (England) Les Wotton 6.21
- (England) Alec Statham 5.49
- (Australia) Clem Mitchell 5.48
- (Australia) Dick Smythe 5.31
- (England) Bob Lovell 3.50
- (England) Stew Fairbairn 3.22
- (England) Bill Pitcher 3.10

New Cross

- (United States) Jack Milne 11.09
- (England) George Newton 8.91
- (England) Stan Greatrex 8.50
- (Australia) Clem Mitchell 6.29
- (England) Joe Francis 5.88
- (England) Ron Johnson 5.83
- (England) Norman Evans 5.80
- (Australia) Ernie Evans 4.03
- (Australia) Mick Murphy (John Glass) 3.56
- (England) Nobby Key 3.38
- (England) Jack Dalton 2.35
- (Australia) Bill Longley 2.00

Wembley

- (Australia) Lionel Van Praag 10.42
- (England) Frank Charles 8.96
- (England) Ginger Lees 8.24
- (England) Eric Gregory 6.22
- (New Zealand) Wally Kilmister 5.60
- (England) Cliff Parkinson 5.37
- (England) Tommy Price 5.37
- (England) Wally Lloyd 5.00
- (England) Gus Kuhn 5.00
- (England) Colin Watson 2.00

West Ham

- (Australia) Bluey Wilkinson 10.23
- (Canada) Eric Chitty 9.37
- (England) Tommy Croombs 8.92
- (England) Arthur Atkinson 8.54
- (England) Tiger Stevenson 7.18
- (Australia) Charlie Spinks 6.03
- (England) Broncho Dixon 5.83
- (England) Ken Brett 5.60
- (England) Phil Bishop 4.63
- (England) Lloyd Goffe 3.50

Wimbledon

- (United States) Wilbur Lamoreaux 8.14
- (Australia) Eric Collins 6.92
- (England) Claude Rye 5.88
- (Australia) Bill Rogers 5.23
- (England) Geoff Pymar 5.06
- (United States) Byrd McKinney 5.02
- (Australia) Wally Little 5.00
- (England) Gus Kuhn 4.93
- (Australia) Jack Sharp 4.89
- (England) Wal Morton 4.00
- (United States) Miny Waln 3.73
- (England) Ron Howes 3.08
- (England) Bert Spencer 2.86
- (England) Reg Vigor 2.48
- (Germany) Alfred Rumrich 1.09
- (England) Wilf Plant 0.29

== See also ==
- List of United Kingdom Speedway League Champions
- Knockout Cup (speedway)
