= 1936 Provincial Speedway League =

British motorcycle speedway tier 2 league season

- League: Provincial League
- No. of competitors: 5
- Champions: Southampton Saints
- Provincial League Trophy: Southampton Saints
- National Trophy (provincial final): Southampton Saints
- Highest average: George Greenwood
- Division/s above: 1936 National League

The 1936 Provincial Speedway League was the first season of the Provincial League, introduced as a second tier to the National League. It was formed after Mr B. Southouse (the Cardiff speedway manager for the Greyhound Racing Association) proposed that a new league be formed and organised a syndicate, including Nottingham and Liverpool speedway.

Six speedway teams started the season but Cardiff White City speedway withdrew after just nine matches and had their record expunged. Their star riders, Cliff Parkinson, George Greenwood, Tommy Price and Ted Bravery, all joined Nottingham.

Southampton Saints were the champions on race points difference over Bristol Bulldogs.

Due to the brevity of the season, teams also competed for the Provincial Trophy in a league format. Cardiff had only completed one fixture before folding and their record was expunged. West Ham Hawks which was West Ham Hammers' reserve side, also competed, but raced home meetings at Southampton. Southampton Saints won the Provincial trophy to complete the double.

== Provincial League Final table ==
Pos	Team	M	W	D	L	Pts
1	Southampton Saints	16	10	0	6	20
2	Bristol Bulldogs	16	10	0	6	20
3	Nottingham	16	9	0	7	18
4	Liverpool Merseysiders	16	9	0	7	18
5	Plymouth Panthers	16	2	0	14	4

M = Matches; W = Wins; D = Draws; L = Losses; Pts = Total Points

Withdrawal (Record expunged) : Cardiff White City speedway

== Fixtures & results ==
=== A fixtures ===
Home \ Away	BRI	CAR	LIV	NOT	PLY	SOU
Bristol		38–33	41–30	43–29	40–32	38–32
Cardiff White City	39–33		42–48	35–36	37–34	33–37
Liverpool	36–35	n/a		29–40	43–24	40–31
Nottingham	33–34	38–34	30–41		39.5–32.5	30–41
Plymouth	35–37	57–15	25–47	35–37		47–25
SOU	43–29	n/a	35–37	53.5–17.5	49–20	

Legend: Blue = home team win; Yellow = draw; Red = away team win.

=== B fixtures ===
Home \ Away	BRI	CAR	LIV	NOT	PLY	SOU
Bristol		n/a	52–19	43–29	49–23	35–37
Cardiff White City	n/a		n/a	n/a	n/a	50–22
Liverpool	39–33	n/a		34–37	44–26	40–30
Nottingham	53–19	n/a	55–17		48–23	47–24
Plymouth	35–36	n/a	40–32	26–44		29–43
SOU	41.5–29.5	n/a	43–27	42–30	49–23	

Legend: Blue = home team win; Yellow = draw; Red = away team win.

== Provincial Trophy Final table ==
Pos	Team	M	W	D	L	Pts
1	Southampton Saints	10	8	0	2	16
2	Bristol Bulldogs	10	7	0	3	14
3	Liverpool Merseysiders	10	5	0	5	10
4	Plymouth Panthers	10	4	1	5	9
5	Nottingham	10	4	0	6	8
6	West Ham Hawks	10	1	1	8	3

M = Matches; W = Wins; D = Draws; L = Losses; Pts = Total Points

Withdrawal (Record expunged) : Cardiff White City speedway

== National Trophy ==
The 1936 National Trophy was the sixth edition of the Knockout Cup. Southampton Saints won the Provincial Final round and therefore qualified for the quarter finals proper (the round when the tier one sides entered the competition).

Provincial League First Round

Date	Team One	Score	Team Two
04/05	Liverpool	35-34	Nottingham
14/04	Nottingham	34-38	Liverpool
13/04	Cardiff	33-38	Southampton
10/04	Southampton	38-33	Cardiff

=== Final ===
First leg

14 May 1936

Southampton Saints Frank Goulden 10 Billy Dallison 9 Alec Statham 7 Bert Jones 7 Fred Strecker 6 Tiger Lewis 3	42 – 28	Liverpool Merseysiders Ernie Price 8 Eric Blain 6 Jack Hargreaves 5 Oliver Hart 4 Tom A Price 3 Stan Hart 2

Banister Court Stadium

Second leg

18 May 1936

Liverpool Merseysiders Eric Blain 10 Stan Hart 7 Tom A Price 6 Tommy Allott 4 Syd Plevin 4 Ernie Price 3 Oliver Hart 3 Jack Hargreaves 2	39 – 31	Southampton Saints Billy Dallison 12 Fred Strecker 6 Bert Jones 4 Syd Griffiths 3 Tiger Lewis 3 Frank Goulden 2 Alec Statham 1

Stanley Stadium

Southampton were the National Trophy Provincial Final winners, winning on aggregate 73-67.

== Riders & final averages ==
Bristol

- (Australia) Eric Collins 9.12
- (England) Harry Shepherd 7.59
- (England) Wal Morton 7.22
- (Australia) Bill Rogers 7.02
- (England) Roy Dook 6.93
- (England) Mike Erskine 5.57
- (England) Fred Leavis 5.51
- (Australia) Ernie Evans 4.80
- (Australia) Bert Spencer 3.67

Liverpool

- (England) Eric Blain 7.79
- (England) Syd Plevin 7.33
- (England) Stan Hart 7.29
- (England) Jack Hargreaves 7.17
- (England) Thomas Arthur Price 7.03
- (England) Oliver Hart 5.90
- (England) Ernie Price 5.60
- (England) Alan Butler 4.00

Nottingham

- (England) George Greenwood 10.50
- (England) Cliff Parkinson 9.37
- (England) Ted Bravery 9.05
- (England) Bill Stanley 8.57
- (England) Tiger Hart 7.16
- (England) Chun Moore 6.91
- (England) Tommy Price 6.75
- (England) George Dykes 6.41
- (England) Arthur Tims 5.63
- (England) Norman Trinmell 2.81

Plymouth

- (New Zealand) Jack Hobson 7.56
- (England) Les Bowden 6.53
- (Australia) Dick Wise 6.00
- (Australia) Billy Lamont 6.00
- (Australia) Jack Bibby 5.56
- (England) Fred Tuck 5.23
- (England) Les Gregory 4.13
- (Australia) Don Hemingway 2.60

Southampton

- (England) Fred Strecker 9.04
- (England) Billy Dallison 8.50
- (England) Frank Goulden 8.41
- (Wales) Syd Griffiths 8.13
- (Australia) Harry Lewis 7.54
- (Australia) Bert Jones 7.50
- (England) Alec Statham 6.87
- (England) Bob Lovell 6.22
- (Australia) Art Fenn 4.52
- (England) Cyril Anderson 3.08

== See also ==
- List of United Kingdom Speedway League Champions
- Knockout Cup (speedway)
