= Mike Erskine =

British motorcycle speedway rider (1914 – 1985)

- Born: 22 August 1914; Westbury, Wiltshire, England
- Died: 19 November 1985 (aged 71); East Tytherley, Hampshire, England
- Nationality: British (English)

Career history
- 1935–1936: New Cross Lambs/Tamers
- 1936: Bristol Bulldogs
- 1938–1939: Southampton Saints
- 1946–1951: Wimbledon Dons

Team honours
- 1950, 1951: National Trophy

Michael Gratney Erskine (22 August 1914 – 19 November 1985) was a motorcycle speedway rider from England.

== Biography ==
Erskine, born in Westbury, Wiltshire, first rode for the Coventry junior team in 1933 and was involved in a crash that saw him hit the safety fence so hard that it pulled a supporting post out of the ground. It was reported that he was leading the race by a distance, indicating that his riding style was one of full commitment. The following season in 1934, he signed for New Cross Rangers but continued to ride for Coventry on loan.

Erskine made British leagues debut riding for New Cross during the 1935 Speedway National League season and was loaned out to Bristol Bulldogs in the Provincial League for the 1936 season.

In 1937, Erskine concentrated on grasstrack racing and even designed a course at Farleigh Hungerford, before returning to conventional speedway in 1938 after signing for Southampton Saints.

After World War II, Erskine blossomed as a rider and spent six years with Wimbledon Dons in the top division from 1946 to 1951, winning the 1950 and 1951 National Trophy. However, the highlight of his career was reaching the Championship round of the 1950 Individual Speedway World Championship and standing as a reserve for the World final at Wembley Stadium, where he participated in a heat.
