= Johnny Hole =

British speedway rider

- Born: 18 December 1924; Bath, England
- Died: 8 May 2016 (aged 91)
- Nationality: British (English)

Career history
- 1948–1955, 1960: Bristol Bulldogs
- 1956–1960: Southampton Saints

Team honours
- 1948, 1949, 1954: League champion (tier 2)
- 1949, 1956: National Trophy (tier 2)
- 1954: Southern Shield Winner

John Derrick Hole (18 December 1924 – 8 May 2016) was an English motorcycle speedway rider.

== Biography ==
Hole, born in Bath, England, began his speedway career after signing for Bristol Bulldogs in 1947. Hole's brother-in-law Eric Salmon was also a Bristol rider and brothers Billy Hole and Graham Hole also signed for Bristol, despite interest for all three brothers from London clubs.

During his rookie league campaign for Bristol, during the 1948 Speedway National League Division Two season, Hole contributed to a league title success. The following season in 1949, the Bulldogs, which still contained all four family members, sealed a league and National Trophy double. Johnny improved his average that season to 6.31 and rode 60 matches throughout the season.

In 1950, Bristol entered the top division of speedway in Britain, competing in the National League division 1 from 1950 to 1953. Hole was ever-present. A return to division 2 was instantly followed by another league title. The Bulldogs withdrew after starting the 1955 season, leaving Hole without a club but in 1956, he signed for Southampton Saints and won another National Trophy that season. He continued to represent the Saints in division 1 from 1957 to 1959.

Arguably, Hole's standout season as a rider was in the 1960 Provincial Speedway League and on his return to Bristol, where he recorded an impressive 10.00 average. He was the first holder of the Provincial League's Silver Sash.
