= Chris Boss =

Welsh motorcycle speedway rider

- Chris Boss in 1951
- Born: 12 June 1928; Barry, Wales
- Died: 30 May 2011 (aged 82); Bristol, England
- Nationality: British (Welsh)

Career history
- 1949-1955: Bristol Bulldogs

Team honours
- 1949, 1954: National League Div 2 Champion
- 1949: National Trophy
- 1954: Southern Shield Winner

Christopher John Boss (12 June 1928 – 30 May 2011) was an international motorcycle speedway rider from Wales. He earned five international caps for the England national speedway team.

== Biography ==
Boss was born in 1928 in Barry, Wales and competed in grasstrack meetings in his teens. In 1949, he joined the Bristol Bulldogs after the Knowle Stadium manager George Allen signed him on the recommendation of team manager Bill Hamblin. He rode for Bristol in the reserve berth during the 1949 Speedway National League Division Two season. He experienced immediate success winning the league and National Trophy (Div 2 final) with the club. In April 1951, he crashed heavily in a fixture in Ireland against Dublin Eagles and was taken to hospital after being unconscious for ten minutes. He would later guest ride in Ireland for the Chapelizod speedway team.

Boss' form improved dramatically from his early seasons to the point that he was selected to represent England in New Zealand during January 1953. With no Welsh national team, Welsh riders were eligible to ride for England.

Boss would remain at Bristol throughout his entire career and was left without a club following the demise of Bristol speedway during the 1955 Speedway National League Division Two season. However, he did compete in some meetings when Bristol operated under an open licence during 1959.

At retirement, Boss had earned five international caps for the England national speedway team.
