= Dick Bradley =

English speedway rider (1924–2022)

- Bradley in 1951
- Born: 28 November 1924; Netheravon, Wiltshire
- Died: 28 October 2022 (aged 97); Chiseldon, Wiltshire
- Nationality: British (English)

Career history
- 1948-1955: Bristol Bulldogs
- 1955-1963: Southampton Saints
- 1964-1965: Newport Wasps

Individual honours
- 1951, 1952, 1953: Speedway World Championship finalist

Team honours
- 1962: National League Champion
- 1961: National Trophy Winner
- 1948, 1949, 1954: National League Division II Champion
- 1949, 1956: National Trophy (Div 2) Winner
- 1964: Provincial League KO Cup Winner
- 1954: Southern Shield Winner

Derrick Edward Bradley (28 November 1924 – 30 October 2022) was an English motorcycle speedway rider. He earned 24 international caps for the England national speedway team.

== Speedway career ==
When Bradley left school he became an apprentice mechanic for a company called Skurrays. After competing in grasstrack racing, he was given a trial by Bristol Bulldogs manager Bill Hamblin. He raced a few times in 1948 and was a league winner with Bristol during the 1948 Speedway National League Division Two season and the 1949 Speedway National League Division Two season.

Bradley became one of the leading speedway riders in the 1950s. He reached the final of the Speedway World Championship on three occasions in the 1951 Individual Speedway World Championship, 1952 Individual Speedway World Championship and the 1953 Individual Speedway World Championship. He was capped by the England national speedway team against Australia in 1952.

Bradley rode in the top tier of British Speedway from 1948-1965, riding for Bristol Bulldogs, Southampton Saints and Newport Wasps. His successes included winning the National Trophy and the National League with the Southampton Saints.

Bradley lived in Chiseldon, Wiltshire for 65 years. He died on 30 October 2022.

== World final appearances ==
=== Individual World Championship ===
- 1951 – (England) London, Wembley Stadium – Reserve - 2pts
- 1952 – (England) London, Wembley Stadium – 7th – 9pts
- 1953 – (England) London, Wembley Stadium – 15th – 2pts
