= Syd Griffiths =

Welsh motorcycle speedway rider

- Born: 29 February 1905; Hawarden, Wales
- Died: 11 September 1940 (aged 35); Southampton, England
- Nationality: British (Welsh)

Career history
- 1933: Clapton Saints
- 1934, 1936–1937: Harringay Tigers
- 1936–1939: Southampton Saints

Team honours
- 1936: Provincial League
- 1936: National Trophy (Provincial Final)

Sidney Griffiths (26 February 1905 – 11 September 1940) was an international motorcycle speedway rider from Wales. He earned one international cap for the England national speedway team (with no Welsh national team, Welsh riders represented England).

== Biography ==
Griffiths, born in Wales, was a miner before he first rode in the British speedway leagues riding for Clapton Saints during the 1933 Speedway National League. He rode in novice races and also worked in the speedway pits. The Claton promotion moved to Harringay in 1934, so he became a Harringay Tigers asset. His debut for Harringay on 12 May 1934, ended badly because he broke his collar-bone, although he did return to ride for the team before the end of the season. In 1935, he was a Harringay reserve and struggled to gain a ride for the first team.

When Charles Knott Sr. and his team the Southampton Saints declared their intention to race in the new Provincial League in 1936, they secured the services of Griffiths. He finally rode a full season during the 1936 Provincial Speedway League and helped Southampton secure the treble of Provincial league, National trophy (Provincial final) and Provincial League trophy and he recorded a strong 8.13 average. He continued with Southampton in 1937 and won another National trophy with the south coast club. His form had improved so much by the end of 1937 that he was selected to represent England against Australia in test match on 8 September. He continually returned to Wales to mine coal during the winter speedway breaks and rode with a piece of coal in his leathers as a lucky charm.

After another solid season in 1938, Griffiths followed Southampton into the National League (top division) during the 1939 Speedway National League season but it was curtailed due to the outbreak of war.

Griffiths' career and life was cut short after he was mortally wounded on 11 September 1940, in an air raid on the Cunliffe-Owens aircraft factory in Southampton. He died later that day at South Hampshire Hospital.
