= Provincial League (disambiguation) =

Provincial League may refer to:

- Provincial League, the old regional Football league in Thailand from 1999 to 2008
- Provincial League (baseball), a North American baseball minor league
- Provincial League (speedway), a British motorcycle speedway league that ran from 1960 to 1964
- Provincial League (1936–1937), a British motorcycle speedway league that ran from 1936 to 1937
