= Jack Mountford =

British motorcycle speedway rider (1923–2004)

- Mountford in 1951
- Born: 18 December 1923; Salisbury, Wiltshire, England
- Died: 3 June 2004 (aged 80)
- Nationality: British (English)

Career history
- 1947–1952: Bristol Bulldogs
- 1953–1954: Leicester Hunters
- 1954: Southampton Saints

Team honours
- 1948, 1949: League champion (tier 2)
- 1949: National Trophy (tier 2)

John Mountford (18 December 1923 – 3 June 2004) was a motorcycle speedway rider from England. He was known as Jack Mountford during his speedway career.

== Biography ==
Mountford, born in Salisbury, Wiltshire, began riding for the Bristol Bulldogs junior team in 1946, one year before making his British leagues debut riding for the first team during the 1947 Speedway National League Division Two season. The following season in 1948, he helped Bristol win the league title and one year later he was averaging an impressive 9.75 on his way to helping Bristol achieve the 1949 league and National Trophy double. Additionally, Mountford reached the Championship rounds of the 1950 Individual Speedway World Championship and the 1951 Individual Speedway World Championship.

The Bulldogs moved up to Britain's top league in 1950, finishing seventh, before a sixth-place finish in 1951. Mountford's last season with the club was in 1952 because the Leicester Hunters team manager Squib Burton moved to sign him from Bristol in February 1953. He failed to settle with the Midlands club and only stayed one full season. At the start of the 1954 season, he rode a few times for Leicester and Southampton Saints before retiring.

After speedway, Mountford took up hydroplane racing and won the D class hydroplane championship of Great Britain in 1958.
