= Acorn Dobson =

English speedway rider

- Born: 21 December 1905; Gorton, Manchester, England
- Died: 2 November 2004 (aged 99); Australia
- Nationality: British (English)

Career history
- 1934–1939: Belle Vue Aces

Team honours
- 1935, 1936: National League
- 1935, 1936, 1937: National Trophy
- 1935, 1936, 1937: ACU Cup

Stanley Dobson (21 December 1905 – 2 November 2004) was a motorcycle speedway rider who rode in the early days of speedway in the United Kingdom. He was considered a pioneer because he appeared in dirt track racing during 1928, one year before the speedway leagues were even formed. He rode under the nickname Acorn Dobson, which was also his family nickname.

== Career ==
Dobson was born in late 1905 and raised in the Gorton area of Manchester. By 1928, he had become involved in the new sport of dirt track oval speedway and gained a reputation as a daring rider. During the latter part of 1928 he suffered a serious hand injury after catching his fingers in a chain.

During the inaugural season of league speedway in the United Kingdom (the 1929 Speedway English Dirt Track League) Dobson continued to race in exhibition races and challenges. He was a star name at the relatively new Belle Vue Stadium but chose not to race for the Belle Vue team in the league. The team withdrew from the first league season.

Dobson picked up a series of injuries during 1930 and 1931 which led to the announcement that he was retiring. However, in 1932, he made a comeback and raced at several meetings over the next two seasons. In 1934, he helped the Belle Vue Aces in the reserve position of the team following an injury crisis, which led to him being retained by the team for the 1935 Speedway National League and 1936 Speedway National League seasons. The team dominated British speedway winning the treble of league, National trophy and AC Cup for the second and third consecutive years.

Dobson continued to ride for Belle Vue until the outbreak of World War II, although the last two years were with the reserve side. He worked in a garage as a mechanic and his mechanical background resulted in him working as an aircraft fitter during the war.

Dobson is believed to have emigrated to Australia in August 1949 and to have died in 2004.

== Players cigarette cards ==
Dobson is listed as number 13 of 50 in the 1930s Player's cigarette card collection.
