= Les Wotton =

British motorcycle speedway rider

- Born: 26 September 1907; Bath, England
- Died: 9 April 1995 (aged 87); Bristol, England
- Nationality: British (English)

Career history
- 1929: White City, Manchester
- 1930: Liverpool Merseysiders
- 1931: Preston
- 1932: West Ham Hammers
- 1933: Nottingham
- 1934: Birmingham Bulldogs
- 1935–1939: Harringay Tigers
- 1946: New Cross Rangers
- 1947–1949: Wimbledon Dons
- 1949: Coventry Bees
- 1950–1951: Southampton Saints

Team honours
- 1935: London Cup

Leslie William Wotton (26 September 1907 – 9 April 1995) was an international motorcycle speedway rider from England. He earned 13 international caps for the England national speedway team.

== Biography ==
Wotton, born in Bath, rode in the pioneer years of British speedway beginning his British leagues career riding for White City, Manchester during the early part of the 1929 Speedway English Dirt Track League season. He helped the team set the pace and lead the league table, winning 18 of their 20 matches but following a dispute, Manchester withdrew from the league handing Leeds the title. He rode the remainder of the season with Liverpool. He stayed with Liverpool for the 1930 Speedway Northern League season before joining Preston for 1931.

On the formation of the new National League, Wotton was allocated to West Ham Hammers, where he won the Star Championship qualifier. However, he then signed for White City Nottingham for 1933. Another club change ensued in 1934, this time signing for Birmingham Bulldogs.

Wotton finally found some stability with Harringay Tigers, where he would spend five years. With Harringay he won the London Cup in 1935, reached the Knockout Cup final in 1935 and 1936 and was capped by England.

Following the enforced break because of World War II, Wotton returned to speedway riding in meetings during the Summer of 1945. He joined the New Cross Rangers in 1946 and then moved on to Wimbledon Dons, averaging 8.50 in 1947.

With his career winding down, Wotton doubled up with Coventry Bees in 1949 and finally rode two seasons for the Southampton Saints from 1950 to 1951.

Out of speedway, Wotton was a haulage contractor.
