= Bristol Bulldogs =

Motorcycle speedway team

Club information
- Track address: Knowle Stadium (1928–1961); Eastville Stadium (1977–1978)
- Country: England
- Founded: 1928
- Closed: 1978
- League: Provincial League; National League; British League

Major team honours
| Provincial League champions | 1937 |
| National League Division Two | 1948, 1949, 1954 |
| National Trophy (div 2) winners | 1949 |
| Provincial Cup winners | 1960 |

The Bristol Bulldogs were a British motorcycle speedway team based at the Knowle Stadium, Bristol, England from 1928 to 1961 and later Eastville Stadium from 1977 to 1978.

== History ==
=== Origins and 1920s ===
Speedway in Bristol began during the inaugural pioneer season of racing in 1928. A track was laid inside the greyhound track at Knowle Stadium by the British Dirt Track Riders Association of Manchester and the first meeting was held on 25 August. Although there was no league racing, a Bristol team rode challenge matches throughout the 1928 and 1929 seasons and local riders, Len Parker, Jimmy Douglas and Ted Bravery came to prominence..

=== 1930s ===
After the 1930 season the racing ceased at Knowle Stadium for five years. In January 1936, promoter Mr T. Bradbury-Pratt agreed a deal with Reg Bennett the MD of the stadium. A team (that would adopt the nickname Bulldogs) was formed to compete in the inaugural 1936 Provincial Speedway League. The first home match was against Southampton Saints on 8 May and the team finished the season in 2nd place behind Southampton in both the league and Trophy tables.

After the successful 1936 season, the club did even better, winning their first trophy, the Provincial League title. The star riders in 1937 were Bill Rogers, Roy Dook, Harry Shepherd and Roland Stobbart. The Bulldogs raced in the top tier National League in 1938 before racing stopped mid-way through 1939, due to the outbreak of World War II.

=== 1940s ===
The track operated a season of challenge matches in 1946 with the team known as Ex-Bristol but returned in 1947 to compete in the National League Division Two, following hard work by managers Reg Whitcombe and Bob Steel. The Bulldogs led by Fred Tuck completed back to back league title wins in 1948 and 1949 and won the National Trophy (div 2). Bristol's team of 1949 has a rare record in that it whitewashed the visiting Glasgow Tigers 70 -14 in a fourteen heat National League fixture.

=== 1950s ===
The team was promoted to National League Division One in 1950. The Division One Bulldogs team featured most of the Division Two men and as a result the team struggled to make an impact despite the efforts of Geoff Pymar and Dick Bradley and for one season by Sweden Olle Nygren in 1953.

The Bulldogs reverted to Division Two for the 1954 season, under the team management of Bill Hamblin. The decision to drop a division proved right when the team won the league title. Dick Bradley recorded a 10.58 average that season. Unfortunately despite the success and the fact that the team started the 1955 season, promoter George Allen pulled the plug on the team citing poor attendances.

=== 1960s ===
The Bulldogs returned in 1960 as one of the founder members of the Provincial League and were led by former rider Eric Salmon. Johnny Hole captained the team and New Zealander Trevor Redmond was signed as number 1. Redmond won the Riders' Championship on 24 September 1960. The team had a successful season, winning the Provincial League Knockout Cup.

However, in December 1960, speedway director Charles Foot announced that he had been told that the stadium was to be sold for re-development, leaving Bristol without speedway again. The Bristol riders and promotion moved to Plymouth and raced as the Plymouth Bulldogs in 1961.

=== 1970s ===
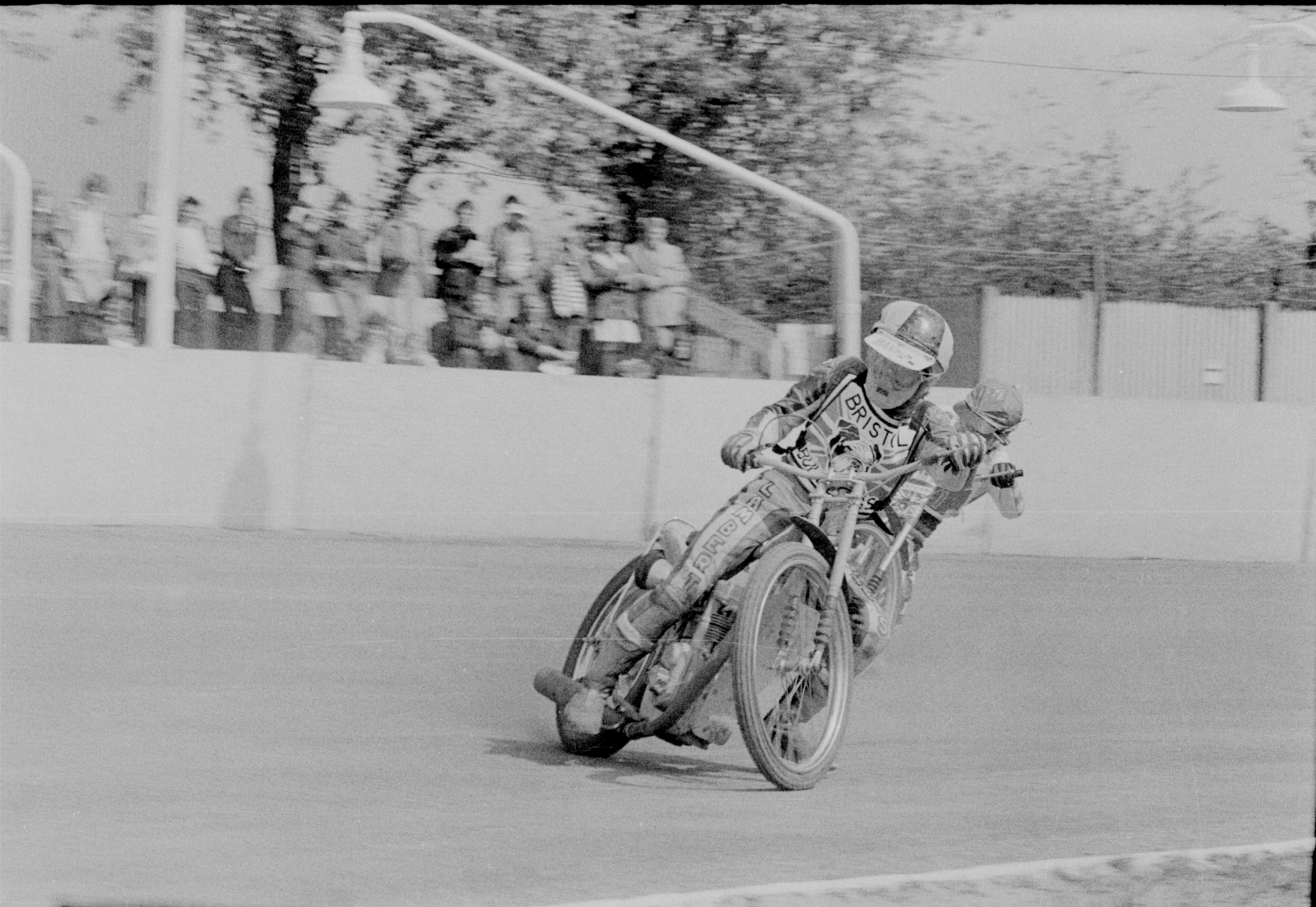
Bulldog rider, possibly Phil Crump

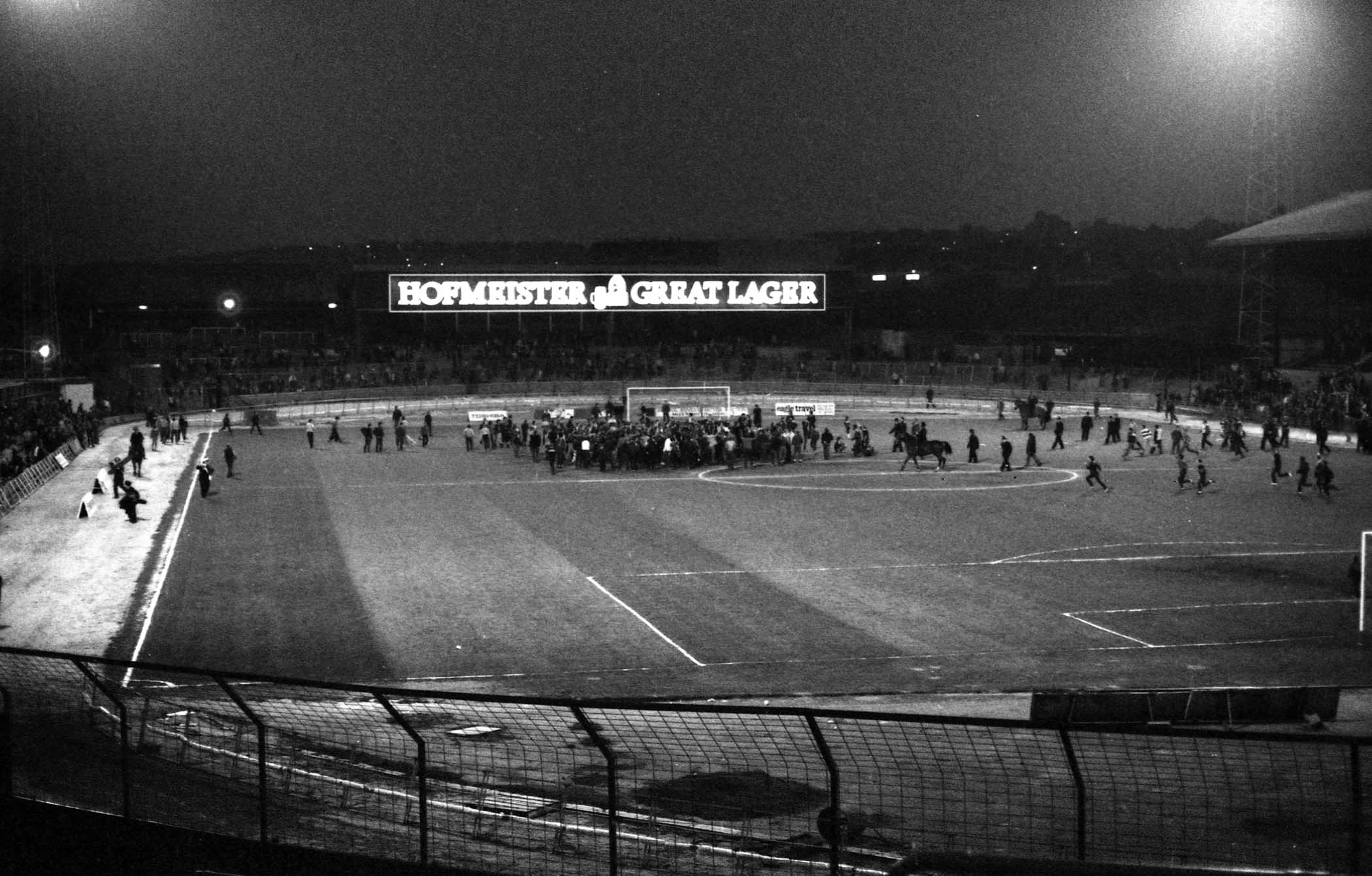
Eastville Stadium

Speedway returned to Bristol at Eastville Stadium in 1977, after the Newport Wasps team moved to Bristol. Despite a delay with track construction the Bulldogs finished the season in 12th place. Wally Mawdsley was the promoter and Australian riders Phil Crump (the club captain) and Phil Herne both averaged 9+. The track also operated again in 1978 and crowds of 7,000+ were averaged in both 1977 and 1978, far larger than most clubs. The track size was 390 metres and visiting teams disliked the sandy surface that also cut into the Bristol Rovers football pitch.

After the 1978 British League season the team were evicted due to planning matters.

A year or two after closing a Bristol Select team rode at Birmingham (for legal reasons they could not use the Bulldogs name). Over 1,000 Bristol speedway fans travelled up to Birmingham, such was their love for the sport. Stars of the former team included Phil Crump.

=== 2010s ===
In February 2010, Bristol Speedway Ltd lodged a pre-application for planning permission to build a Speedway track on the former Shell Tankers site, Avonmouth, Bristol and on 15 October 2012, they re-submitted a pre-application for a new Speedway track and Moto Cross track at Avonmouth, Bristol. In 2017, plans were being worked on bringing the Bulldogs team back on the track in 2018 in a series of away challenge meetings.

== Season summary ==
| Year and league | Position | Notes |
|---|---|---|
| 1936 Provincial Speedway League | 2nd | |
| 1937 Provincial Speedway League | 1st | champions |
| 1938 Speedway National League | 7th | |
| 1939 Speedway National League Division Two | 5th+ | + when league was suspended |
| 1947 Speedway National League Division Two | 6th | |
| 1948 Speedway National League Division Two | 1st | champions |
| 1949 Speedway National League Division Two | 1st | champions & National Trophy (div 2) winners |
| 1950 Speedway National League | 7th | |
| 1951 Speedway National League | 6th | |
| 1952 Speedway National League | 8th | |
| 1953 Speedway National League | 9th | |
| 1954 Speedway National League Division Two | 1st | champions |
| 1955 Speedway National League Division Two | n/a | withdrew |
| 1960 Provincial Speedway League | 3rd | Provincial Cup winners |
| 1977 British League season | 12th | at Eastville Stadium |
| 1978 British League season | 9th | at Eastville Stadium |

== Notable riders ==
- (Wales) Chris Boss
- (England) Dick Bradley
- (Australia) Phil Crump
- (England) Roy Dook
- (Australia) Vic Duggan
- (Denmark) Morian Hansen
- (Australia) Phil Herne
- (England) Billy Hole
- (England) Johnny Hole
- (United States) Steve Gresham
- (Norway) Tormod Langli
- (United States) Cordy Milne
- (England) Jack Mountford
- (England) Geoff Pymar
- (New Zealand) Trevor Redmond
- (Australia) Bill Rogers
- (England) Harry Shepherd
- (England) Roland Stobbart
- (England) Fred Tuck
- (England) Jack Unstead

== See also ==
- Category:Bristol Bulldogs riders
- List of defunct motorcycle speedway teams in the United Kingdom
