= Les Gregory (speedway rider) =

British motorcycle speedway rider

- Born: 29 September 1914; Hackney, London, England
- Died: 4 March 1993 (aged 78); Stoke-on-Trent, England
- Nationality: British (English)

Career history
- 1936: Plymouth Panthers
- 1937: Birmingham Bulldogs
- 1938: Sheffield Tigers

Leslie Norman Stansell Gregory (29 September 1914 – 4 March 1993) was an international motorcycle speedway rider and team manager from England. He earned one international cap for the England national speedway team and was the England team manager in 1951.

== Biography ==
Gregory was born in Hackney, London, educated at Haberdashers' Boys' School and trained to become a mechanical engineer to work at his father's cream containers business in Shepherds's Bush. He competed in the 1932 amateur Isle of Man TT before coming to prominence on a speedway track, when he rode for the Crystal Palace discoveries in April 1933. Crystal Palace Glaziers signed him in May 1933, after he impressed in earlier races.

Despite not riding for a team during the 1934 season, Gregory was selected for the first ever England team for the 1934–35 winter tour of Australia. Before the 1935 UK season started, he signed for West Ham Hammers from Harringay Tigers, who held his registration. However, he moved to Plymouth Tigers in July and raced in challenge matches. He returned to Australia with England for the 1935–36 winter test series. His first British leagues season as a first team regular was in the newly formed 1936 Provincial Speedway League, where he rode for Plymouth (now called the Panthers). He was also awarded the captaincy of the team.

Another winter tour in Australia resulted in a heavy crash that broke seven bones in his hand but he did get engaged during the tour to the sister of Tiger Stevenson. On his return he signed for Birmingham Bulldogs, where he spent the 1937 season.

When Sheffield were granted a licence for the 1938 season, Gregory joined them. His last season was in 1939, riding in a couple of events before he retired from riding aged just 25.

In 1948, Gregory became the team manager of Rayleigh Rockets and helped them into the National League. Two years later in 1950, he joined Stoke Potters as their new team manager. In September 1951, he was appointed the England team manager for the test series against New Zealand.
