= Fred Tuck =

British motorcycle speedway rider

- Born: 16 October 1915; Leyton, London, England
- Died: January 1993 (aged 77); Bristol, England
- Nationality: British (English)

Career history
- 1935: Wembley Lions
- 1935–1936: Plymouth Tigers/Panthers
- 1937–1938: Nottingham
- 1938: Leeds Lions
- 1939: Stoke Potters
- 1939: Belle Vue Aces Reserves
- 1946–1947: Odsal Boomerangs
- 1947–1950: Bristol Bulldogs

Individual honours
- 1948: Highest league average

Team honours
- 1948, 1949: League champion (tier 2)
- 1949: National Trophy (tier 2)
- 1937: Provincial Trophy
- 1937: Provincial League Coronation Cup

Henry George Frederick Tuck (16 October 1915 – x January 1993) was a motorcycle speedway rider from England.

== Biography ==
Tuck, born in Leyton, London, started riding on speedway tracks in 1935, taking part in various meetings around the country for Plymouth Panthers and Wembley Lions reserves. Although he made a full league appearance for Wembley in 1935, it was not until the following season that he became a regular with the Plymouth team, during the 1936 Provincial Speedway League season.

In 1937, Tuck was signed by Hackney Wick Wolves but because the White City Greyhound Company owned both Hackney and Nottingham at the time, he was allocated to Nottingham for the season, where he won the Provincial Trophy with the team. His form began to improve significantly in 1938 but his team Nottingham withdrew and he switched to the Leeds Lions team, who had replaced Nottingham in the league. Another fractured season ensued, when in 1939 he started for Stoke Potters, only to be forced again to move, this time to Belle Vue Aces reserves because Stoke withdrew from the league.

In 1943, Tuck won the all English Best Pairs Championship with Eric Chitty.

After the resumption of speedway after World War II, Tuck at last found stability riding for Odsal Boomerangs for two seasons and then signing for Bristol Bulldogs for the remaining years of his career. At Bristol, he not only topped the team's averages but was the league's best rider during the 1948 Speedway National League Division Two season, recording a 10.20 league average. His contribution helped Bristol win the league title in 1948 and the league and National Trophy double the following season.
