= Fred Strecker =

British speedway rider (1906–1976)

- Born: 1 April 1906; Nottingham, England
- Died: 12 October 1976 (aged 70); Nottingham, England
- Nationality: British (English)

Career history
- 1930: Manchester White City
- 1931, 1933, 1937-1938: Nottingham
- 1932: Belle Vue Aces
- 1934: Birmingham Bulldogs
- 1935-1936: Harringay Tigers
- 1936: Southampton Saints
- 1937: Hackney Wick Wolves
- 1938: Leeds Lions
- 1939: Stoke Potters
- 1939: Norwich Stars

Team honours
- 1936: Provincial League champions
- 1937: Provincial Trophy
- 1937: Provincial League Coronation Cup

Frederick Strecker (1906–1976) was an international speedway rider from England.

== Speedway career ==
In 1930, when riding for Nottingham, Strecker represented England against Australia. He continued to ride for Nottingham in 1933 and later from 1937 to 1938.

In 1936, during the 1936 Provincial Speedway League season, Strecker finished third in the averages and won the 1936 Provincial Speedway League title with Southampton. The following season, he rode primarily for Nottingham but did also make appearances for Hackney Wick Wolves during the 1937 Speedway National League season.

== Personal life ==
Strecker's parents were German born and they changed their surname from to Streicher. After World War II, Fred was a motor car and metal dealer and also promoted stock car racing.

== Players cigarette cards ==
Strecker is listed as number 44 of 50 in the 1930s Player's cigarette card collection.
