= Oliver Hart (speedway rider) =

English motorcycle speedway rider

- Born: 13 September 1912; Wigan, England
- Died: 16 July 1983 (aged 70); Chorley, Lancashire
- Nationality: British (English)

Career history
- 1936-1937: Liverpool Merseysiders
- 1937-1939: Belle Vue Merseysiders
- 1939: Stoke Potters
- 1946: Wimbledon Dons
- 1947-1949: Odsal Boomerangs
- 1950-1952: Bradford Tudors

Individual honours
- 1941: Northern Riders' Champion

Oliver Hart (13 September 1912 – 16 July 1983) was an international motorcycle speedway rider.

== Career ==
Hart first rode with the Liverpool Merseysiders during the 1936 Provincial Speedway League season. He was part of the syndicate that brought speedway back to Liverpool in 1936.

In 1937, the Liverpool promotion dropped out of the league in mid-July and was replaced by the Belle Vue Aces promotion. Because Belle Vue already had a team in the National League they renamed the Provincial League team to Belle Vue Merseysiders and moved the entire team. On 25 August 1937, he witnessed his brother's death; Stan Hart died following a crash at the Hall Green Stadium in Birmingham. The death was investigated and ruled to be accidental death because they believed that his tyre burst causing him to fall into the path of another bike. Oliver testified at the investigation and decided that he would not race again.

However, in 1938, Hart resumed racing with the Belle Vue Aces and in 1939 he top scored for the Stoke Potters/Belle Vue reserves promotion. His best league from was while he was a Bradford rider and he averaged 8.57 in 1948.

Hart finished scored a point in the Speedway World Championship final in 1949 riding at reserve. Hart was notable in speedway as being one of the last riders to only use the leg trailing method of riding. Hart made 16 international appearances for England between 1948 and 1951.

== Family ==
Hart's twin brother Ron and another brother Stan were also speedway riders.

== World final appearances ==
- 1949 - (England) London, Wembley Stadium - 17th - 1pt
