= Stan Hart (speedway rider) =

British motorcycle speedway rider

- Born: 29 September 1914; Wigan, England
- Died: 25 August 1937 (aged 22); Birmingham, England
- Nationality: British (English)

Career history
- 1936–1937: Liverpool Merseysiders
- 1937: Belle Vue Merseysiders

James Stanley Hart (29 September 1914 – 25 August 1937) was a motorcycle speedway rider from England.

== Biography ==
Hart, born in Wigan, rode for the Liverpool Seaforth speedway team at Seaforth Greyhound Stadium in a series of challenge matches during 1935. He began his British leagues career riding for another Liverpool club called the Liverpool Merseysiders, during the 1936 Provincial Speedway League season.

Hart achieved a strong 7.29 average during the season and was duly retained for the 1937 season. In 1937, the Liverpool promotion dropped out of the league in mid-July and was replaced by the Belle Vue Aces promotion, who also had a team in the National League. At this point, the Provincial League team were renamed the Belle Vue Merseysiders and Hart continued to ride well, despite the team promotion issues.

On 25 August 1937, Hart died following a crash at the Hall Green Stadium in Birmingham. The death was investigated and ruled to be accidental death because they believed that his tyre burst causing him to fall into the path of another bike. His brother Oliver Hart witnessed the crash and testified at the investigation.

== See also ==
- Rider deaths in motorcycle speedway
