= Billy Hole (speedway rider) =

British motorcycle speedway rider

- Hole in 1951
- Born: 23 October 1919; Bath, England
- Died: 4 April 1986 (aged 66); Bath, England
- Nationality: British (English)

Career history
- 1947–1955: Bristol Bulldogs
- 1955: Exeter Falcons

Team honours
- 1948, 1949, 1954: League champion (tier 2)
- 1949: National Trophy (tier 2)
- 1954: Southern Shield Winner

William Stanley Alfred Hole (23 October 1919 – 4 April 1986) was a motorcycle speedway rider from England. He was known as Billy Hole during his speedway career.

== Biography ==
Hole, born in Bath, began riding for the Bristol Bulldogs junior team in 1946, one year before making his British League debut riding for the first team during the 1947 Speedway National League Division Two season.

The following season in 1948, Hole helped Bristol win the league title and one year later he was averaging an impressive 10.11 on his way to helping Bristol achieve the 1949 league and National Trophy double. Additionally, Hole reached the Championship rounds of the 1950 Individual Speedway World Championship and the 1951 Individual Speedway World Championship, and in the latter just missed out on a place in the World final.

The Bulldogs moved up to Britain's top league in 1950, finishing seventh, before a sixth-place finish in 1951. Hole remained as one of Bristol's main riders, became the club captain and was a fan's favourite.

On the team's return to the second division, for the 1954 Speedway National League Division Two season, Hole captained the team to league success again, and even in his eighth season with them, he was still averaging 8.28.

Mid-way through the 1955 season, Bristol withdrew from the league, forcing Hole to ride for another club. He finished the season with the Exeter Falcons and that proved to be his last season in speedway.
