= Birmingham Bulldogs (speedway) =

Motorcycle speedway team

Birmingham Bulldogs Hall Green Bulldogs

Club information
- Track address: Hall Green Stadium; York Road, Hall Green, Birmingham
- Country: England
- Founded: 1934
- Closed: 1938
- League: National League

Club facts
- Track size: 302 yards

Birmingham Bulldogs also known as the Hall Green Bulldogs were a British motorcycle speedway team who operated between 1929 and 1938 and were based at Hall Green Stadium in Birmingham, England.

== History ==
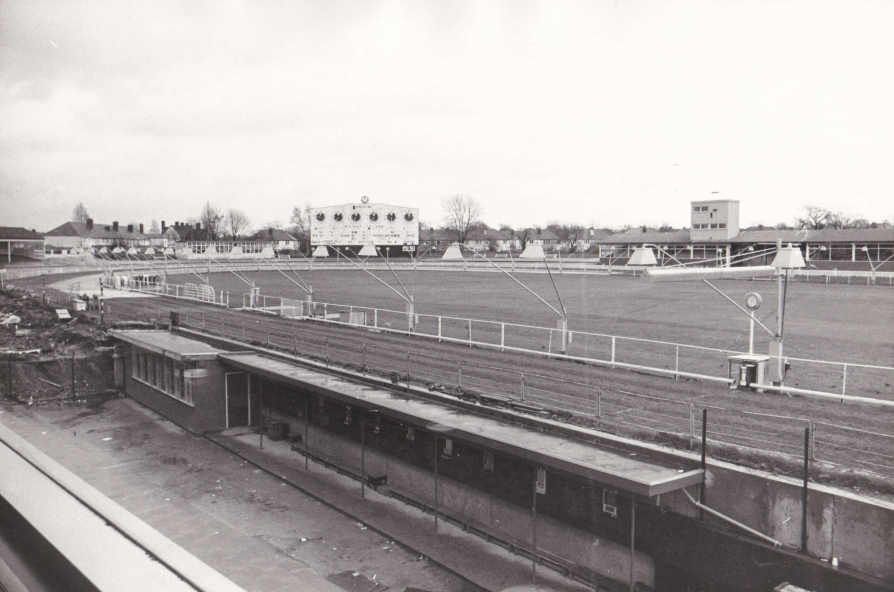
Hall Green Stadium

In 1928, a company called International Speedways Ltd introduced the sport at Hall Green Stadium, just one year after it was constructed and opened as a greyhound track. International Speedways was the largest operator of speedway at the time after signing a contract to race at several Greyhound Racing Association venues such as Wimbledon Stadium.

The following season in 1929, a team called Hall Green was formed to race in the inaugural Southern League and the team wore the Aston Villa colours. Johnny Lloyd was the first star rider and actually topped the league averages in 1929. However, the speedway was subject to a takeover from Motordromes Ltd (who owned Brandon Stadium) in June 1929 and the team were withdrawn from the 1929 Speedway Southern League, having their record expunged, although other meetings continued at the track afterwards.

The following season in 1930, the Hall Green Bulldogs returned and led by Billy Dallison they competed in the 1930 Speedway Southern League finishing fifth.

The team only rode in the National Trophy during 1931.

In 1934, the Bulldogs (now known as the Birmingham Bulldogs) rejoined the league for the 1934 Speedway National League finishing seventh. The club returned to league action during the 1937 Provincial Speedway League finishing 6th and only raced one more year afterwards in the 1938 Speedway National League Division Two.

The club experienced continued problems with residents throughout their existence. The last tie held at Hall Green Stadium was a Northern Cup tie on 19 October 1938.

== Notable riders ==
- Billy Dallison
- Tiger Hart
- Johnny Lloyd
- Fred Strecker
- Dick Wise

== Season summary ==
Year and league	Position	Notes
1929 Speedway Southern League	N/A	withdrew, record expunged
1930 Speedway Southern League	5th	
1934 Speedway National League	7th	
1937 Provincial Speedway League	6th	
1938 Speedway National League Division Two	7th	
