= Jack Hargreaves (speedway rider) =

British motorcycle speedway rider (1912 – 1944)

- Born: 16 December 1912; Keighley, West Yorkshire
- Died: 15 January 1944 (aged 31); Bingley, West Yorkshire
- Nationality: British (English)

Career history
- 1936–1937: Liverpool Merseysiders
- 1937–1939: Belle Vue Aces

Team honours
- 1937, 1939: National Trophy
- 1937: A.C.U. Cup

Jack Hargreaves (16 December 1912 – 15 January 1944) was a motorcycle speedway rider from England.

== Biography ==
Hargreaves, born in Keighley, West Yorkshire, began racing for the Liverpool team that raced at Seaforth Greyhound Stadium, although Seaforth did not race in the National League. He began his British leagues career riding for Liverpool Merseysiders during the 1936 Provincial Speedway League season, where he reached the final of the National Trophy.

In 1937, the Liverpool team withdrew mid-season and Hargreaves (who had topped their averages) joined the Belle Vue Aces in the top league, contributing towards the team as they won both the National Trophy and A.C.U. Cup double.

Hargreaves was again part of the Belle Vue team, when they won the 1939 National Trophy, just before the season was ended by World War II. He averaged 6.18 that season. He also reached the Championship round of the 1939 Individual Speedway World Championship.

During the war, Hargreaves was a car mechanic in a local garage, but he died as a result of a road accident on 15 January 1944, when the motorcycle he was riding collided with a bus. He died shortly afterwards in hospital.
