= Roy Dook =

British speedway rider

- Born: 23 August 1907; West Ham, London, England
- Died: June 1980 (aged 72); Waltham Forest, Greater London, England
- Nationality: British (English)

Career history
- 1929, 1931: Lea Bridge
- 1930: West Ham Hammers
- 1932–1933: Coventry Bees
- 1934–1936: New Cross Lambs/Tamers
- 1936–1939: Bristol Bulldogs
- 1946–1948: Birmingham Brummies
- 1951: Newcastle Diamonds

Team honours
- 1937: League champion (tier 2)
- 1948: National Trophy (tier 2)
- 1934: London Cup
- 1948: Anniversary Cup

John Roy Dook (23 August 1907 – June 1980) was an English motorcycle speedway rider.

== Biography ==
Dook, born in West Ham, London, began his British leagues career riding for Lea Bridge during the 1929 Speedway Southern League season. He was a pioneer rider appearing during the first season of league racing in Britain.

The following season in 1930, Dook was signed by his home town club West Ham Hammers but struggled to cement a place in the team and returned to ride for Lea Bridge in 1931.

After impressing around the Lythalls Lane Stadium at the end of the 1932 season, Dook was duly signed by Coventry, where he spent two seasons averaging a solid 6.18 and 6.19 respectively. His career stalled somewhat after joining New Cross Lambs in 1934, although he did win his first team honours when the Lambs won the London Cup.

In 1935, Dook's season was interrupted by a dislocated shoulder and a significant muscle injury and while with New Cross in 1936, he doubled up for Bristol Bulldogs to race in the 1936 Provincial Speedway League. It was at Bristol that he gained most of his success, helping the team to become the 1937 Provincial league champions. Dook averaged an impressive 9.01 from 41 matches.

Dook continued to ride for Bristol until the outbreak of World War II and would not return to racing until 1946, riding with the Birmingham Brummies. In his final season with Birmingham in 1948, he contributed towards the Brummies winning both the National Trophy and Anniversary Cup for division 2 teams.

Dook gave up riding and in 1950 took over as manager of Shelbourne Park in Dublin. He had previously performed the same role at Leicester. In 1951, he became manager of the Newcastle Diamonds and made several appearances for the club.
