= Frank Goulden =

British speedway rider

- Born: 19 August 1909; Southampton, England
- Died: 3 June 1976 (aged 66); Southampton, England
- Nationality: British (English)

Career history
- 1930-1932, 1936-1939: Southampton Saints
- 1932: Clapton Saints
- 1932-1933: Plymouth Devils
- 1934: West Ham Hammers
- 1936-1937: Harringay Tigers

Individual honours
- 1936: Leading average

Team honours
- 1936: Provincial League Champion
- 1936: Provincial Trophy Winner
- 1937: Div 2 National Trophy winners

Frank Donald Goulden (1909–1976) was an international motorcycle speedway rider for the England national speedway team. He earned one international cap for the national speedway team.

== Speedway career ==
In 1929 and 1930, Goulden was a leading rider for the Southampton Saints and helped them finish runner-up in the Southern League, during consecutive seasons. When the new National League was created in 1932, he joined the Plymouth Tigers and stayed with them until the end of the 1933 season. In 1934, he joined West Ham Hammers, in exchange for Tiger Hart.

In 1932, Goulden was selected for England for the first time.

Goulden returned to Southampton in 1936 and topped the averages during the 1937 Provincial Speedway League. From 1937 to 1940, he was the Southampton captain. In 1948, he helped coach the Plymouth Devils.

== Players cigarette cards ==
Goulden is listed as number 14 of 50 in the 1930s Player's cigarette card collection.
