= Andy Menzies =

Australian motorcycle speedway rider

- Born: 6 September 1911; Victoria, Australia
- Died: 11 October 1993 (aged 82)
- Nationality: Australian

Career history
- 1938–1939: Wembley Lions
- 1948: Odsal Boomerangs
- 1949: Sheffield Tigers

Individual honours
- 1947: Australian Solo Championship

Andrew George Menzies (6 September 1911 – 11 October 1993) was an Australian motorcycle speedway rider. He was champion of Australia in 1947 and earned six international caps for the Australia national speedway team.

== Biography ==
Menzies, born in Victoria, began his British leagues career riding for Wembley Lions during the 1938 Speedway National League season. Although he served most of his rookie season in the Wembley reserves he was described as a clever rider.

The following season in 1939, Menzies began to improve and performed well in a Speedway World Championship qualifier. Unfortunately he then lost six years of his career due to World War II.

On his return to speedway in 1947, Menzies was called up the Australia national speedway team for a test series against England and he won the Australian Solo Championship.

Menzies' 1947 form resulted in interest from the British clubs for the 1948 Speedway National League season and he joined the Odsal Boomerangs.

Menzies' last season in Britain was in 1949, when he rode for the Sheffield Tigers and averaged 6.27 for the season.
