= Liverpool Chads =

British motorcycle speedway team

Club information
- Track address: Stanley Stadium; Prescot Road; Fairfield, Liverpool
- Country: England
- Founded: 1929
- Closed: 1960
- League: Northern League; Provincial League; National League

Liverpool Chads are a defunct motorcycle speedway team who were based at the Stanley Stadium in Prescot Road, Fairfield, Liverpool, England.

== History ==
Speedway in Liverpool began in the summer of 1928 when a track was constructed inside the greyhound track at Stanley greyhound stadium. The sport which had recently been introduced to the United Kingdom from Australia, attracted an audience to the first practice on 21 August, with a full race meeting held a few days later on 25 August.

A Liverpool speedway's team was duly established and the first league racing took place in 1929, with the formation of the English Dirt Track League, effectively a Northern League, which ran alongside the Southern League. The Liverpool team's first fixture was a home match against Burnley on 4 May 1929. The following year in 1930, the team competed in the Northern League and finished runner-up in the league that season. Although declaring for the 1931 season the speedway ended at Stanley for several years, although there were events held at the rival track Seaforth Greyhound Stadium from 1934 to 1935.

Speedway returned with the Liverpool Merseysiders for the start of the 1936 Provincial Speedway League season and continued into 1937 but in mid-July the Liverpool promotion dropped out of the league due to financial problems and was replaced by the Belle Vue Aces promotion led by Mr E. C. Spence. Belle Vue also had a team in the National League so at this point the Provincial League team were renamed the Belle Vue Merseysiders.

The sport was revived in 1949 by James Baxter (a promoter at Southampton and Plymouth) who agreed a deal with the Electric Hare Greyhound Racing Ltd, the stadium owners. The team's new nickname Liverpool Chads' referred to a popular piece of cartoon graffiti at the time known as a Chad. They opened again in the National League Division Three and were again based at Stanley Stadium, Liverpool.

The team moved up to National League Division Two for the 1951 season and operated there until 1953 when the track closed, again in mid season. A new side now called Liverpool Eagles were created in 1957 but closed after a few meetings. A few open meetings were staged in 1959 and the club, now racing as the Liverpool Pirates, competed in the 1960 Provincial League.

The club again closed at the end of the year and the Stanley Stadium was demolished and a fruit market was constructed on the site.

Speedway was also staged in Liverpool in the 1930s at Seaforth Greyhound Stadium.

== Notable riders ==
- Peter Craven (World Champion)
- Oliver Hart
- Ginger Lees (rode in the first ever Speedway World Championship final in 1936)
- Tommy Price

== Season summary ==
Year and league	Position	Notes
1929 Speedway English Dirt Track League	8th	
1930 Speedway Northern League	2nd	
1936 Provincial Speedway League	4th	
1937 Provincial Speedway League	4th	withdrew, fixtures taken over by Belle Vue Aces
1949 Speedway National League Division Three	9th	
1950 Speedway National League Division Three	8th	
1951 Speedway National League Division Two	13th	
1952 Speedway National League Division Two	11th	
1953 Speedway National League Division Two	N/A	withdrew, record expunged
1960 Provincial Speedway League	9th	
