= Harry Shepherd =

British speedway rider (1903–1988)

- Born: 5 May 1903; London, England
- Died: 17 May 1988 (aged 85)
- Nationality: British (English)

Career history
- 1930–1933: Crystal Palace Glaziers
- 1934–1936: New Cross Lambs/Tamers
- 1936–1939: Bristol Bulldogs
- 1937: Wimbledon Dons

Team honours
- 1937: Provincial League
- 1931, 1934: London Cup

George Harold Shepherd (5 May 1903 – 17 May 1988) was an international speedway rider who has been credited with the invention of the starting gate still used in speedway today.

== Career ==
Born in London, England, Shepherd appeared in the finals of the 1931 Star Riders' Championship, the forerunner to the Speedway World Championship.

Shepherd started his British league career with Crystal Palace Glaziers, where he spent four seasons from 1930 to 1933.

In 1933, Shepherd, along with New Cross promoter Fred Mockford invented the starting gate which is still in use today, by stretching a set of tapes across the track which were then released by a hand-operated electric mechanism, similar to those used in horse racing. This starting procedure allowed for much fairer starts.

Shepherd's final season, 1939, saw Shepherd make his international debut for England.

Shepherd died in May 1988 at North Shore, Auckland, New Zealand. His final resting place is Leamington Cemetery in Cambridge, New Zealand. The ashes of Harry and his wife Anne are in the headstone of the grave of their daughter-in-law Joy Shepherd.

== Players cigarette cards ==
Shepherd is listed as number 41 of 50 in the 1930s Player's cigarette card collection.
