= Bill Rogers (speedway rider) =

Australian motorcycle speedway rider

- Born: 1911; St Kilda, Victoria, Australia
- Died: 5 March 1992; Sydney
- Nationality: Australian

Career history
- 1934, 1936–1937, 1948–1949: Wimbledon Dons
- 1936–1938: Bristol Bulldogs
- 1948: Belle Vue Aces
- 1949: Southampton Saints

Individual honours
- 1932, 1947: Australian Solo Championship
- 1940: Victorian State Champion
- 1949: New South Wales State Champion

Team honours
- 1937: Provincial League winner

William Rogers (1911 – 5 March 1992) was a motorcycle speedway rider from Australia. He was twice champion of Australia in 1932 and 1947 and earned 13 international caps for the Australia national speedway team.

== Biography ==
Rogers, born in St Kilda, Victoria, won the 1932 Australian Solo Championship. He began his British leagues career after being persuaded by Vic Huxley to ride for Wimbledon Dons. He began riding for Wimbledon during the 1934 Speedway National League season, although he only made three appearances.

Rogers missed the 1935 season because of a broken leg but returned to England in 1936. Wimbledon then loaned him out to Bristol Bulldogs for the 1936 Provincial Speedway League season, where he achieved a 9.15 average.

Rogers became a popular rider at Bristol, spending two more seasons with them in 1937 and winning the league title with the club) and in 1938, but had his season ended in 1938 by another broken leg.

It would be Rogers' last season in the United Kingdom for ten years, after missing most of them because of World War II and then riding in Australia. He won a second Australian national title in 1947. In 1948, he returned to the UK to ride for Belle Vue Aces and then had one final season in 1949 with Southampton Saints.
