= Billy Dallison =

British speedway rider

- Born: 20 June 1900; Camberwell, England
- Died: 25 March 1946 (aged 45); Birmingham, England
- Nationality: British (English)

Career history
- 1929: White City, Manchester
- 1930, 1934: Hall Green Bulldogs
- 1931: High Beech
- 1932–1933: Clapton Saints
- 1932: Wimbledon Dons
- 1934–1937: Harringay Tigers
- 1936–1939: Southampton Saints

Team honours
- 1936: Provincial League Champion
- 1936: Provincial Trophy Winner
- 1937: Div 2 National Trophy Winners

William James Baden Dallison (20 June 1900 – 25 March 1946) was a motorcycle speedway rider who rode in the earliest days of the sport in Britain.

== Speedway career ==
Dallison, born in Camberwell, rode in the pioneer years of British speedway beginning his British leagues career riding for White City, Manchester during the 1929 Speedway English Dirt Track League season. He helped the team set the pace and lead the league table, winning 18 of their 20 matches but following a dispute, Manchester withdrew from the league handing Leeds the title.

Dallison rode for Hall Green Bulldogs during the 1930 Speedway Southern League and would remain one of the sports leading riders until the outbreak of World War II. He later became captain of the Birmingham team.

Dallison died suddenly at home, in Birmingham on 25 March 1946.

== Players cigarette cards ==
Dallison is listed as number 11 of 50 in the 1930s Player's cigarette card collection.
