= Phil Bishop =

English speedway rider (1910–1970)

- Born: 7 July 1910; Bow, London, England
- Died: 14 July 1970 (aged 60); Lokeren, Belgium
- Nickname: King of Crash
- Nationality: British (English)

Career history
- 1929: Lea Bridge Saints
- 1930-1931: High Beech
- 1932, 1949-50, 1955: Southampton Saints
- 1932-1933: Clapton Saints
- 1934-1935: Harringay Tigers
- 1936-1939, 1947-1948: West Ham Hammers
- 1938: West Ham Hawks
- 1939: Middlesbrough Bears
- 1946: New Cross Rangers

Team honours
- 1937: National League Champion
- 1935: London Cup Winner
- 1938: ACU Cup Winner

Philip Edward Bishop (7 July 1910 – 14 July 1970) was a motorcycle speedway rider who began racing in 1929, finally retiring from racing in 1963. Known as the 'King of Crash', Bishop survived many crashes whilst racing, but died in a road accident in 1970.

== Biography ==
Born in Bow, London in 1910, Bishop had his first experience of speedway racing at Lea Bridge in 1929, moving on to captain the High Beech team in 1930. He was selected for England in the Test series against Australia in 1931 but did not race. He did ride in England's Australian tour of 1931/2, top-scoring in the fifth Test at Sydney despite nursing several broken ribs and a broken ankle. After two seasons with High Beech, he moved on to Southampton in 1932, the team moving to Lea Bridge mid-season where they became Clapton Saints. He moved on to Harringay in 1934, before joining West Ham in mid-1936, staying with the Hammers until 1939.

Bishop reached the final of the Star Riders' Championship in 1931 and 1933, and represented England against the Dominions in 1938.

After World War II he signed for New Cross but missed much of the season through injury, returning to West Ham in 1947. He moved on to Southampton in 1949, retiring at the end of the 1950 season. He came out of retirement in 1955 to ride in one match for Southampton. This was his final league appearance, but he rode in a series of second-half match races against Ron Johnson at New Cross in 1963.

Bishop was involved in many crashes while racing, earning him the nickname 'King of Crash'.

In 1966, Bishop became team manager of West Ham Hammers and travelled with the team to the Netherlands in 1970 for meetings at Tilburg and Amsterdam. While on their way to Ostend to catch a ferry back to England, the team's minibus was involved in a crash with two lorries and a petrol tanker in Lokeren; Bishop and four of the riders, along with the driver, were killed.

=== Personal life ===
Bishop married Winifred Clevely on 14 July 1935 at Bow.

== Players cigarette cards ==
Bishop is listed as number 3 of 50 in the 1930s Player's cigarette card collection.
