= Banister Court Stadium =

Stadium in the UK

- Interactive map of Banister Court Stadium
- Location: Court Road, Southampton, Hampshire, England
- Coordinates: 50°55′06″N 1°24′31″W

Construction
- Opened: 1928
- Closed: 1963

Banister Court Stadium was a greyhound racing and speedway stadium in Court Road, Southampton, Hampshire, England.

== Origins ==
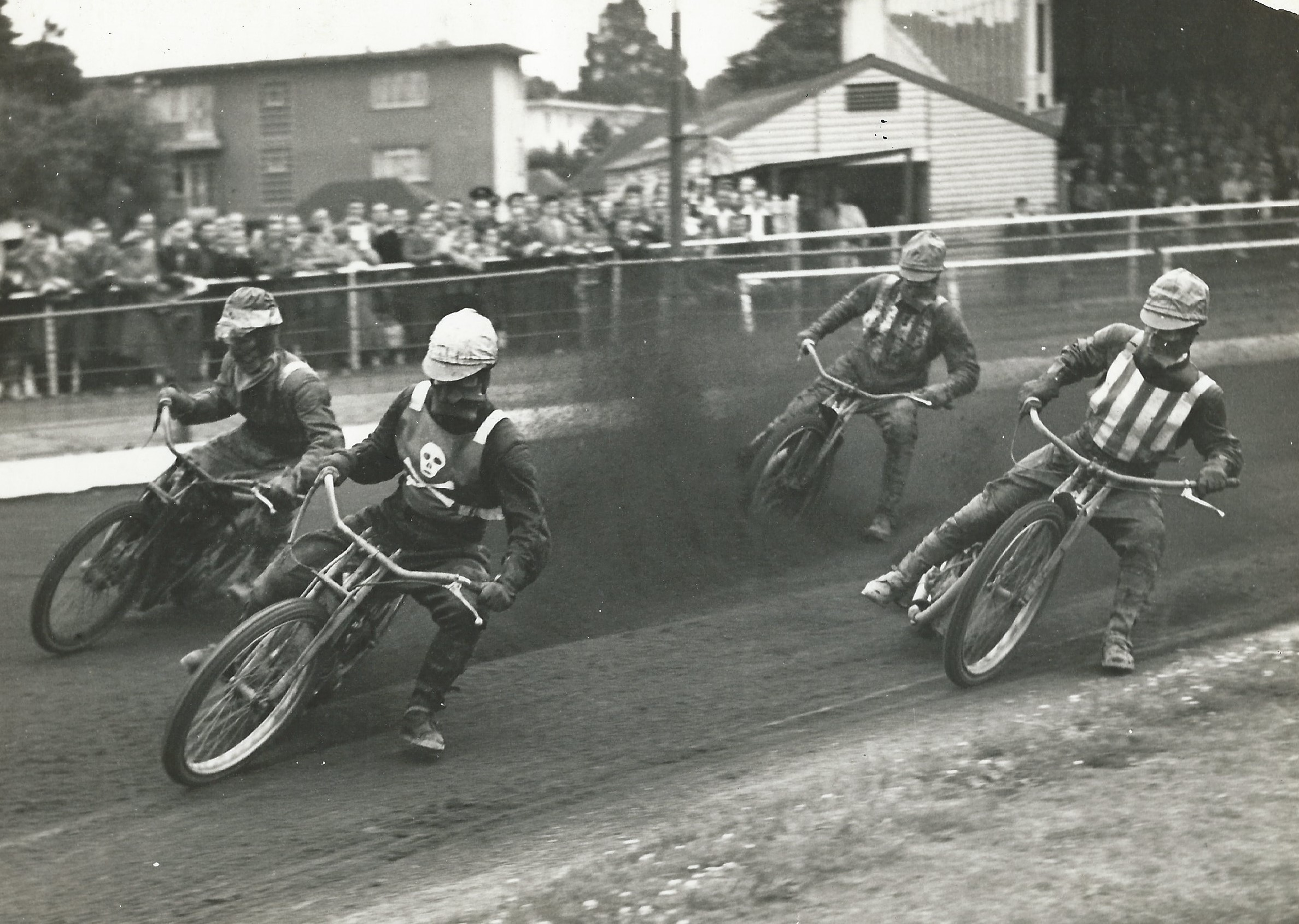
Speedway at Banister Court in 1958, Southampton vs Poole

At the turn of the 20th century Banisters Park in the north of Southampton consisted of the County Ground, Southampton which had been the home of the Hampshire County Cricket Club since 1885 and an area known as Banisters Court on the south side of the ground. Despite the fact that Banisters Park had reduced in size it was still mainly open space unlike the southern and central parts of Southampton.

The Southampton Greyhound Racing Company and a group of businessmen purchased Banister's Court in the late 1920s with the intention to build a greyhound stadium. The site bought consisted mainly of a former well known school called Banister Court Private School, the name Banister derived from Sir Edward Banister owner of the farms that made up the area in the 17th century. The company started construction on the greyhound track where the car park would be accessed from Court Road which was off Banister Road.

== Opening ==
The stadium opened as the Banister Court Stadium on the afternoon of the 6 August 1928. Lord D.L.Lawrence performed the opening ceremony and the first ever race at 3.00 pm was also the first of six heats forming the Southampton Cup over 500 yards and it went to Glengormley's Pride a 7–1 shot in 31.60secs. The third race a match race was won by Miss G.Knott's Jodonna, Knott was the daughter of one of the directors Charlie Knott senior.

The stadium also had a dirt track ready for speedway and featured two large stands offering excellent viewing. The Chairman of the company Mr.J.Morgan and two of the directors Ronald Prideaux and H Pearl addressed the 3,000 people that had turned out to watch the opening. By the end of the meeting there were 6,000 present with another 3,000 attending the evening meeting held from 8.00 pm until 9.30 pm.

== Pre war history ==
Speedway made its debut on 6 October 1928 and one year later the Southampton Greyhound Racing Company was bought out by the Hampshire Greyhound Racing Syndicate led by one of the existing directors and the local businessman and fishmonger Charlie Knott senior. The company was soon renamed Southampton Sports Stadium Ltd.

A greyhound called Buckna Boy represented Southampton in the 1929 and 1930 English Greyhound Derby and was one of the leading contenders for the 1929 running. The fawn dog trained by Renwick later defeated Mick the Miller in the Champion Stakes, finished runner-up in the Welsh Greyhound Derby but lost out when matched against Mick the Miller in 1930. It would be the only recorded instance of a Southampton greyhound competing in major races.

The track layout was described as a fair-sized course, 393 yards in circumference with easy bends and short straights. The hare system used was an 'Inside Sumner'. Although the track did not have a principal event they did hold a race called the "Patrons Nominations Sweepstakes", for 36 runners which were nominated by their owners with the winner from each of the six heats going forward to the final to receive prizes. An annual hospital charity meeting was also held to raise funds for local hospitals.

In 1931 the ice rink was built on the south side of the stadium and shared the car park area. The track managed to race through the war years despite the town suffering considerable bomb damage, it had a lucky escape in 1940 when the ice rink was hit and burned down.

== Post war history ==
Charles Knott senior vowed to build a new ice rink for the city after the war despite the fact that the stadium had also received some bomb damage that prevented the management from offering restaurant facilities after the war. The totalisator figures peaked in 1946 at £1,729,291.

The stadium now consisted of a main grandstand with terracing around three sides; the empty side on the east featured the totalisator buildings, stadium club and kennels which backed onto a police club. The 300 resident kennels could be found at Netley Marsh near Totton, six miles from the track and it was managed by the head trainer Thomas Appleby.

Knott was instrumental in renaming the company to the Southern Sporting Promotions Ltd which now included his son Charles Knott Jr. Knott Jr. had played for the Hampshire County Cricket team, debuting in 1938 and had subsequently taken over the fishmonger side of the business. He retired from first class cricket in 1957.

In 1952 as promised by Knott the new Sportsdome opened which consisted of a rebuilt ice rink, a Bowling alley and the world's largest open air roller skating rink.

== Speedway ==
Speedway took place from 1928 until 1963.

== Closure ==
The Knotts initiated plans to construct a greyhound track around the football pitch and speedway track at Poole which opened on 8 May 1961. It is believed that this was partly the reason why the Knott's listened to offers from prospective buyers for Banisters Court. The Rank Organisation made an offer in 1963 and it was initially accepted. However the deal threatened to break down because the Rank Organisation wanted to build housing on the entire site including the Sportsdome. After further negotiations Rank agreed to keep the Sportsdome so the deal finally went ahead.

The stadium was demolished soon after the closure replaced by housing. The local council named the roads serving the housing Charles Knott Gardens in honour of his efforts for the town of Southampton. The last meeting was held on 19 October 1963. The Sportsdome closed in 1988.

== Track records ==
Distance yards	Greyhound	Time	Date
440	Alliquippa	25.26	29 September 1945
600	Millbrook	35.11	4 May 1946
