= Knowle Stadium =

Former venue in Bristol, England

- Interactive map of Knowle Stadium
- Location: Knowle, Bristol
- Coordinates: 51°25′25″N 2°33′56″W

Construction
- Opened: 1927
- Closed: 1961

Tenants
- Greyhound racing & speedway

The Knowle Stadium was a greyhound racing and speedway venue in Bristol.

== Origins ==
In March 1924 fifteen acres of land on Wells Road, in the Knowle area of Bristol was secured by Albert Ford, chairman of the Bristol Greyhound Club. A stadium was constructed capable of holding 15,000 spectators. The site was on the west side of Wells Road and originally accessed off Back Lane (now Petherton Road).

== Opening ==
Racing started on 23 July 1927 and gave the city its first taste of greyhound racing, (Eastville Stadium did not start racing until June 1928). The grand opening attracted 8,000 people who saw a greyhound called Plunger win the first race. Fifty-five meetings on Mondays, Wednesdays and Saturdays were held in the inaugural year of 1927 overseen by Ford, and attendances fluctuated, but on several occasions there would be over 10,000 turning up to watch the new sport. The main race distance was 500 yards.

== History ==
The track was sold towards the end of the 1927 to a company called the Amalgamated Greyhound Racing Association trading as Knowle Greyhound Stadium (Bristol) Ltd, and they continued racing on the same three nights. The management organised the first-ever 1,000-yard marathon held on 19 June 1933. Reconstructions of the bends took place in January 1937, and the principal races in the fledgling years were the Knowle Owners Challenge Vase that was held four times a year, the Victory Trophy over 550 yards, also held four times per year, and the Hurdles Championship over 525 yards twice yearly. In 1936, the Knowle Sports Club on site was renovated and speedway returned after a five year absence.

Throughout the war the track experienced good crowds, and after the war the track lighting could be used for the first time in six years. The track was described as a good-sized track with a large, 440-yard circumference with long straights (100 yards) and a long run-in. With banked bends it was most suitable for wide runners and larger galloping types. The hare was an 'Inside Sumner', and 500, 525, 550 and 700 yards were the regular post war distances.

There were very large kennel facilities for 126 greyhounds charged at £1, 1s per week, and in addition there was an isolation kennel block with veterinary care and a paddock kennel for race days. Facilities included the Grand Enclosure, Popular Enclosure and two clubs called the Greyhound club and Sports club. In 1947 there was just under half a million pounds staked on the totalisator, a very significant sum but still dwarfed by local rival Eastville. Knowles turnover was £495,354 whereas Eastville staked £1,269,299.

Stan Raymond, Harry Sayers, John Rowe and Marshall were the main trainers during this popular era and into the 1950s.

== Closure ==
In December 1960, speedway director Charles Foot announced that he had been told that the stadium was to be sold for re-development. Some time later the site was sold by the company, and the last meeting was held on 28 January 1961, to be replaced by housing. The company was liquidated by Edward Balfour during March 1961 and the site today is the housing called Long Eaton Drive and Ravenhead Drive.

== Track records ==
Distance yards	Greyhound	Time	Date	Notes
500	Keen And Clever	30.79	1928	
500	Doubtful Dick	30.69	03.10.1928	
500	Dearly Beloved	29.10	1946	
525	Dearly Beloved	30.05	1946	
550	Killanahan Dasher	32.59	12.1944	
550	Fortune Monarch	32.09	08.04.1945	
550	Dearly Beloved	31.43	1946	
