= Provincial League (1936–37) =

UK sports league

- Sport: Speedway
- Founded: 1936
- Folded: 1937
- Competitors: Varied
- Country: United Kingdom

The Provincial League (1936–1937) was a league competition for speedway teams in the United Kingdom.

The league was formed after Mr B. Southouse (the Cardiff speedway manager for the Greyhound Racing Association) proposed that a new league be formed and organised a syndicate, including Nottingham and Liverpool speedway.

The Provincial League was created as a second tier to the National League in 1936 but was renamed National League Division Two in 1938.

The 'Provincial League' name was re-used for a breakaway league from the National League in 1960.

== Champions ==
Season	Champions	Second	Third
1936	Southampton Saints	Bristol Bulldogs	Nottingham
1937	Bristol Bulldogs	Southampton Saints	Nottingham

== See also ==
List of United Kingdom Speedway League Champions
