= Southampton Saints =

Former British motorcycle speedway team

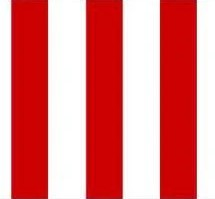

Club information
- Track address: Banister Court Stadium; Southampton; Hampshire
- Country: England
- Founded: 1928
- Closed: 1963

Club facts
- Colours: Red and White stripes
- Track size: 333 yards (304 m)

Major team honours
National League champions	1962
National Trophy Winners	1961
Provincial League champions	1936
Provincial Trophy Winners	1936
Div 2 National Trophy winners	1936, 1937, 1956
Div 3 National Trophy winners	1948

Southampton Saints were a motorcycle speedway team which operated from 1928 until its closure in 1963. Its track was located at Banister Court Stadium in Southampton, Hampshire, England.

== History ==
=== Origins and 1920s ===
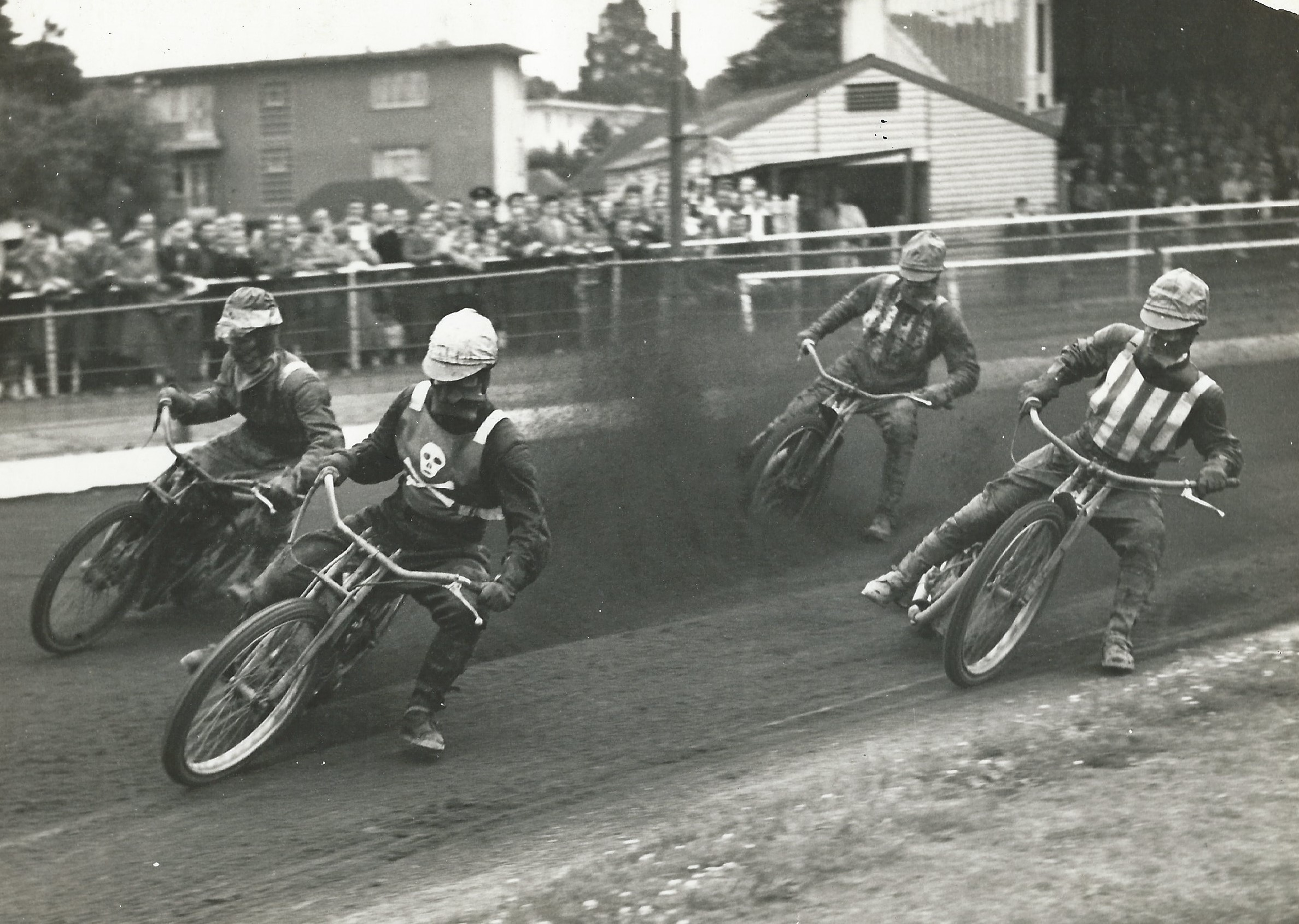
Speedway at Banister Court in 1958, Southampton vs Poole. Bill Holden (Poole) leads against his former team

Speedway arrived in Southampton in 1928, the inaugural year of the new dirt-track racing sport that had arrived from Australia. The first event was held at the Banister Court Stadium on 6 October 1928, with an individual meeting won by Sprouts Elder, who set up the track records at the track.

Southampton were founder members of the 1929 Speedway Southern League, one of two leagues that came into existence that year (the other being the 1929 Speedway English Dirt Track League or Northern league). The team finished runner-up to Stamford Bridge in the league standings.

=== 1930s ===
Elder, Vic Collins, Arnie Hansen and Frank Goulden were all members of the 1930 team that finished second again during the 1930 Speedway Southern League, this time behind Wembley Lions. In 1931 the Parker brothers Jack and Norman were signed and the following year Southampton were one of the founder members of the new National league (a merger of the Southern and Northern leagues). However, in May 1932 and halfway through the 1932 National Association Trophy, the Southampton promotion left Banister Court Stadium to take over the licence at Lea Bridge in London, with the team becoming the Clapton Saints.

In 1936, the Provincial League was formed as the second tier of British speedway. A new promotion stepped in to bring back speedway to Banister Court, initially with a challenge match in 1935, before trials for riders were held to select a team for the 1936 Provincial Speedway League campaign. Rider Frank Goulden returned and was joined by others such as Fred Strecker, Billy Dallison and Syd Griffiths, all of whom produced good averages that season and saw the Saints crowned champions and complete a treble winning season.

The Saints continued to perform well finishing 2nd and 3rd respectively in 1937 and 1938 before six years were lost to World War II.

=== 1940s ===
Southampton returned in 1947 in division 3 and Peter Robinson led the team to a third-place finish, only losing the title to Eastbourne Eagles by one point. The following season the Saints won the division 3 National Trophy defeating Hanley Potters in the final. Alf Bottoms, Bob Oakley and Jimmy Squibb all scored heavily in both legs. The team stepped up to division 2 for the 1949 Speedway National League Division Two season.

=== 1950s ===
The Saints finished 7th in 1950 before resigning mid-way through 1951, largely due to 45% entertainment duty imposed by the government. Jimmy Baxter Director of Southern Speedways withdrew the team from the league and they had their results expunged.

The Saints returned to the rebranded 1952 Speedway Southern League and experienced two tough seasons before they moved up to division 2 in 1954. Improvement followed in 1955 after signing Dick Bradley, and then Bill Holden returned to the club in 1956, a season in which the Saints won the division 2 National Trophy and finish runner-up behind Swindon Robins in the league.

In 1957, Southampton returned to the top division of UK speedway, competing in the National League and proceeded to finish 6th, 3rd and 5th respectively over the next three seasons. Brian Crutcher stood out as the leading rider for the Saints.

=== 1960s ===
Swedish duo Björn Knutson and Olle Nygren starred in 1960 before double world champion Barry Briggs was signed for 1961. The Saints ended up runners up in 1961 behind Wimbledon Dons, with both Knutson and Briggs recording 10+ averages.

The club's finest moment came in 1962 when they became champions of the United Kingdom. Knutson and Briggs led a team that consistently averaged high, Cyril Roger, Alby Golden, Peter Vandenberg, Reg Luckhurst and Dick Bradley all recorded no lower than 6.37.

The club closed in 1963 when the promoter, Charles Knott, sold the stadium to developers.

== Notable riders ==
- (England) Alf Bottoms
- (England) Dick Bradley
- (New Zealand) Barry Briggs
- (England) Brian Crutcher
- (England) Billy Dallison
- (United States) Sprouts Elder
- (England) Frank Goulden
- (Wales) Syd Griffiths
- (Australia) Arnie Hansen
- (England) Bill Holden
- (Sweden) Björn Knutson
- (New Zealand) Brian McKeown
- (New Zealand) Geoff Mardon
- (United States) Cordy Milne
- (Sweden) Olle Nygren
- (England) Bob Oakley
- (England) Jack Parker
- (England) Ernie Rickman
- (England) Peter Robinson
- (England) Cyril Roger
- (England) Jimmy Squibb
- (England) Alec Statham
- (England) Fred Strecker
- (Australia) Chum Taylor

== Season summary ==
Year and league	Position	Notes
1929 Speedway Southern League	2nd	
1930 Speedway Southern League	2nd	
1931 Speedway Southern League	7th	
1936 Provincial Speedway League	1st	Champions, PL Trophy & NL Trophy winners
1937 Provincial Speedway League	2nd	
1938 Speedway National League Division Two	3rd	
1939 Speedway National League	6th+	
1947 Speedway National League Division Three	3rd	
1948 Speedway National League Division Three	3rd	Div 3 National Trophy Winners
1949 Speedway National League Division Two	7th	
1950 Speedway National League Division Two	7th	
1951 Speedway National League Division Two	N/A	resigned record expunged
1952 Speedway Southern League	9th	
1953 Speedway Southern League	5th	
1954 Speedway National League Division Two	9th	
1955 Speedway National League Division Two	5th	
1956 Speedway National League Division Two	2nd	Div 2 National Trophy Winners
1957 Speedway National League	6th	
1958 Speedway National League	3rd	
1959 Speedway National League	5th	
1960 Speedway National League	7th	
1961 Speedway National League	2nd	National Trophy champions
1962 Speedway National League	1st	Champions
1963 Speedway National League	6th	

+ 6th when league was suspended
