= Knockout Cup (speedway) =

British motorcycle speedway competition

- Sport: Speedway
- Founded: 1929
- Country: United Kingdom

Knockout Cup (sometimes referred to as the KO Cup) is a type of British motorcycle speedway competition, examples of which have run annually since 1929.

Each tier of British Speedway has its own respective Knockout Cup. The current Knockout Cup competitions are the SGB Premiership Knockout Cup (tier one), the SGB Championship Knockout Cup (tier two) and the National League Knockout Cup (tier three).

The cups were run in the past under the associated name of the League at the time. For example Elite League Knockout Cup when tier one was the Elite League, a Premier League Knockout Cup when tier two was the Premier League and so on.

== Knockout Cups (chronological order) ==
=== Tier One ===
- National Trophy 1931–1964
- British League Knockout Cup 1965–1967
- British League Division One Knockout Cup 1968–1974
- British League Knockout Cup 1975–1994
- Premier League Knockout Cup 1995–1996
- Elite League Knockout Cup 1997–2012
- not held, 2012–2016
- SGB Premiership Knockout Cup 2017–2019
- not held, 2020–2022
- SGB Premiership Knockout Cup 2023–present

=== Tier Two ===
- National Trophy (provincial final) 1936–1937
- National Trophy (qualifying final) 1938–1956
- Provincial League KO Cup 1960–1964
- British League Division Two Knockout Cup 1968–1974
- New National League Knockout Cup 1975–1976
- National League Knockout Cup 1977–1990
- British League Division Two Knockout Cup 1991–1994
- Academy League Knockout Cup 1995
- Conference League Knockout Cup 1996
- Premier League Knockout Cup 1997–2016
- SGB Championship Knockout Cup 2017–present

=== Tier Three ===
- National Trophy (qualifying final) 1948–1952
- Conference League Knockout Cup 1998–2008
- National League Knockout Cup 2009–2023
- not held 2024–2025

== List of winners ==
Year	Tier one	Year	Tier two	Year	Tier three
1931	Wembley Lions		N/A		N/A
1932	Wembley Lions		N/A		N/A
1933	Belle Vue Aces		N/A		N/A
1934	Belle Vue Aces		N/A		N/A
1935	Belle Vue Aces		N/A		N/A
1936	Belle Vue Aces	1936	Southampton Saints		N/A
1937	Belle Vue Aces	1937	Southampton Saints		N/A
1938	Wimbledon Dons	1938	Norwich Stars		N/A
1939	Belle Vue Aces & Wembley Lions*	1939	Sheffield Tigers		N/A
1946	Belle Vue Aces		N/A		N/A
1947	Belle Vue Aces	1947	Middlesbrough Bears		N/A
1948	Wembley Lions	1948	Birmingham Brummies	1948	Southampton Saints
1949	Belle Vue Aces	1949	Bristol Bulldogs	1949	Hanley Potters
1950	Wimbledon Dons	1950	Halifax Dukes	1950	Oxford Cheetahs
1951	Wimbledon Dons	1951	Norwich Stars	1951	Exeter Falcons
1952	Harringay Racers	1952	Poole Pirates	1952	Plymouth Devils
1953	Wimbledon Dons		N/A		N/A
1954	Wembley Lions		N/A		N/A
1955	Norwich Stars	1955	Poole Pirates		N/A
1956	Wimbledon Dons	1956	Southampton Saints		N/A
1957	N/A		N/A		N/A
1958	Belle Vue Aces		N/A		N/A
1959	Wimbledon Dons		N/A		N/A
1960	Wimbledon Dons	1960	Bristol Bulldogs		N/A
1961	Southampton Saints	1961	Cradley Heathens		N/A
1962	Wimbledon Dons	1962	Exeter Falcons		N/A
1963	Norwich Stars	1963	Cradley Heathens		N/A
1964	Oxford Cheetahs	1964	Newport Wasps		N/A
1965	West Ham Hammers		N/A		N/A
1966	Halifax Dukes		N/A		N/A
1967	Coventry Bees		N/A		N/A
1968	Wimbledon Dons	1968	Canterbury Crusaders		N/A
1969	Wimbledon Dons	1969	Belle Vue Colts		N/A
1970	Wimbledon Dons	1970	Ipswich Witches		N/A
1971	Hackney Hawks	1971	Ipswich Witches		N/A
1972	Belle Vue Aces	1972	Crewe Kings		N/A
1973	Belle Vue Aces	1973	Boston Barracudas		N/A
1974	Sheffield Tigers	1974	Birmingham Brummies		N/A
1975	Belle Vue Aces	1975	Eastbourne Eagles		N/A
1976	Ipswich Witches	1976	Newcastle Diamonds		N/A
1977	King's Lynn Stars	1977	Eastbourne Eagles		N/A
1978	Ipswich Witches	1978	Eastbourne Eagles		N/A
1979	Cradley Heath Heathens	1979	Rye House Rockets		N/A
1980	Cradley Heath Heathens	1980	Berwick Bandits		N/A
1981	Ipswich Witches	1981	Edinburgh Monarchs		N/A
1982	Cradley Heath Heathens	1982	Newcastle Diamonds		N/A
1983	Cradley Heath Heathens	1983	Exeter Falcons		N/A
1984	Ipswich Witches	1984	Hackney Kestrels		N/A
1985	Oxford Cheetahs	1985	Eastbourne Eagles		N/A
1986	Oxford Cheetahs & Cradley Heath Heathens*	1986	Eastbourne Eagles		N/A
1987	Cradley Heath Heathens	1987	Eastbourne Eagles		N/A
1988	Cradley Heath Heathens	1988	Hackney Kestrels		N/A
1989	Cradley Heath Heathens	1989	Berwick Bandits		N/A
1990	Reading Racers	1990	Poole Pirates		N/A
1991	Bradford Dukes	1991	Arena Essex Hammers		N/A
1992	Bradford Dukes	1992	Peterborough Panthers		N/A
1993	Bradford Dukes	1993	Glasgow Tigers		N/A
1994	Eastbourne Eagles	1994	Glasgow Tigers		N/A
1995	Bradford Dukes	1995	Berwick Bandits		N/A
1996	Wolverhampton Wolves	1996	Linlithgow Lightning		N/A
1997	Eastbourne Eagles	1997	Edinburgh Monarchs		N/A
1998	Ipswich Witches	1998	Reading Racers	1998	St Austell Gulls
1999	Peterborough Panthers	1999	Edinburgh Monarchs	1999	St Austell Gulls
2000	King's Lynn Stars	2000	Swindon Robins	2000	Boston Barracudas
2001	Peterborough Panthers	2001	Hull Vikings	2001	Somerset Rebels
2002	Eastbourne Eagles	2002	Sheffield Tigers	2002	Buxton Hitmen
2003	Poole Pirates	2003	Isle of Wight Islanders	2003	Mildenhall Fen Tigers
2004	Poole Pirates	2004	Hull Vikings	2004	Mildenhall Fen Tigers
2005	Belle Vue Aces	2005	King's Lynn Stars	2005	Weymouth Wildcats
2006	Coventry Bees	2006	King's Lynn Stars	2006	Scunthorpe Scorpions
2007	Coventry Bees	2007	King's Lynn Stars	2007	Scunthorpe Scorpions
2008	Eastbourne Eagles	2008	Somerset Rebels	2008	Plymouth Devils
2009	Lakeside Hammers	2009	King's Lynn Stars	2009	Bournemouth Buccaneers
2010	Poole Pirates	2010	Newcastle Diamonds	2010	Buxton Hitmen
2011	Poole Pirates	2011	Newport Wasps	2011	Mildenhall Fen Tigers
2012	Poole Pirates	2012	Newcastle Diamonds	2012	Mildenhall Fen Tigers
2013	not held	2013	Somerset Rebels	2013	Dudley Heathens
2014	not held	2014	Edinburgh Monarchs	2014	Dudley Heathens
2015	not held	2015	Somerset Rebels	2015	Eastbourne Eagles
2016	not held	2016	Glasgow Tigers	2016	Eastbourne Eagles
2017	Belle Vue Aces	2017	Peterborough Panthers	2017	Eastbourne Eagles
2018	Somerset Rebels	2018	Workington Comets	2018	Eastbourne Eagles
2019	Swindon Robins	2019	Redcar Bears	2019	Leicester Lion Cubs
2020	cancelled due to COVID-19	2020	cancelled due to COVID-19	2020	cancelled due to COVID-19
2021	not held	2021	Poole Pirates	2021	not held
2022	not held	2022	Poole Pirates	2022	Leicester Lion Cubs
2023	Ipswich Witches	2023	Scunthorpe Scorpions	2023	Mildenhall Fen Tigers
2024	Sheffield Tigers	2024	Poole Pirates	2024	not held
2025	Leicester Lions	2025	Poole Pirates	2025	not held
2026	Leicester Lions	2026	Berwick Bandits	2026	not held

Shared title*

Most Tier One Knockout Cups

Name	Titles
Belle Vue Aces	14
Wimbledon Dons	11
Cradley Heath Heathens	8
Ipswich Witches	6
Poole Pirates	5
Bradford Dukes	5
Wembley Lions	5
