= 1963 Speedway National League =

British motorcycle speedway season

- League: National League
- Season: 1963
- No. of competitors: 7
- Champions: Belle Vue Aces
- National Trophy: Norwich Stars
- Highest average: Ove Fundin
- Division/s below: 1963 Provincial League

The 1963 National League was the 29th season and the eighteenth post-war season of the highest tier of motorcycle speedway in Great Britain.

== Summary ==
The seven entrants were the same as those that had finished the previous season and matches were ridden home and away twice. Belle Vue Aces won their first title in 27 years.

Belle Vue's successful season was soured by a tragedy and the speedway world was in shock when the double world champion Peter Craven died following a challenge match at Edinburgh's Old Meadowbank stadium, on 20 September 1963. Just six days after he lost world crown, Craven swerved to avoid hitting fallen race leader George Hunter and hit the safety fence. Craven was rushed to the Royal Infirmary of Edinburgh, where he died on 24 September.

== Final table ==
Pos	Team	PL	W	D	L	Pts
1	Belle Vue Aces	24	17	0	7	34
2	Norwich Stars	24	13	2	9	28
3	Wimbledon Dons	24	12	1	11	25
4	Coventry Bees	24	11	2	11	24
5	Swindon Robins	24	10	2	12	22
6	Southampton Saints	24	11	0	13	22
7	Oxford Cheetahs	24	6	1	17	13

== Fixtures and results ==
=== A Fixtures ===
Home \ Away	BV	COV	NOR	OX	SOT	SWI	WIM
Belle Vue		45–33	41–37	52–26	50–28	49–29	43–34
Coventry	30–48		39–39	40–38	44–34	45–33	53–25
Norwich	46–32	35–43		43–35	47–31	42–36	41–37
Oxford	40–38	44–34	36–42		44–34	35–43	34–44
Southampton	56–22	56–22	48–30	49–29		48–30	44–34
Swindon	37–41	47–31	48–30	43–35	49–29		44–34
Wimbledon	36–42	45–33	44–31	48–30	48–30	40–37	

Legend: Blue = home team win; Yellow = draw; Red = away team win.

=== B Fixtures ===
Home \ Away	BV	COV	NOR	OX	SOT	SWI	WIM
Belle Vue		41–37	44–34	44–34	50–28	47–31	46–31
Coventry	42–36		48–30	42–36	43–33	44–34	39–39
Norwich	45–33	37–41		46–32	53–25	+	43–35
Oxford	45–33	46–32	35–43		42–36	39–39	42–36
Southampton	44–34	41–37	39–38	46–32		38–40	38–40
Swindon	33–45	53–25	39–39	54–24	38–40		40–27
Wimbledon	45–33	42–35	38–40	44–34	40–38	48–30	

Legend: Blue = home team win; Yellow = draw; Red = away team win.

+Norwich awarded points

== Top ten riders ==
The top ten riders are listed by their points average and only applies to the league.

	Rider	Nat	Team	C.M.A.
1	Ove Fundin	(Sweden)	Norwich Stars	10.71
2	Dick Fisher	(England)	Belle Vue Aces	10.19
3	Ronnie Moore	(New Zealand)	Wimbledon Dons	10.17
4	The late Peter Craven	(England)	Belle Vue Aces	10.13
5	Nigel Boocock	(England)	Coventry Bees	9.84
6	Ron How	(England)	Wimbledon Dons	9.68
7	Björn Knutson	(Sweden)	Southampton Saints	9.27
8	Barry Briggs	(New Zealand)	Southampton Saints	9.13
9	Ken McKinlay	(Scotland)	Coventry Bees	8.99
10	Peter Moore	(Australia)	Swindon Robins	8.98

== National Trophy ==
The 1963 National Trophy was the 25th edition of the Knockout Cup. Norwich were the winners.

First round

Date	Team one	Score	Team two
22/06	Norwich	60-24	Wimbledon
17/06	Wimbledon	38-46	Norwich
20/06	Oxford	39-45	Swindon
15/06	Swindon	53-31	Oxford
18/06	Southampton	46-37	Coventry
15/06	Coventry	54-30	Southampton

Semi-finals

Date	Team one	Score	Team two
21/08	Belle Vue	55-29	Coventry
14/08	Coventry	41-43	Belle Vue
09/08	Swindon	48-36	Norwich
31/07	Norwich	49-35	Swindon

=== Final ===
First leg

7 September 1963

Belle Vue Aces Dick Fisher 14 Peter Craven 14 Sören Sjösten 10 Gordon McGregor 9 Cyril Maidment 4 Bill Powell 0 Jim Yacoby 0	51 – 33	Norwich Stars Trevor Hedge 9 Terry Betts 8 Olle Nygren 8 Billy Bales 4 Jimmy Gooch 2 John Debbage 1 Reg Trott 1

Hyde Road Stadium

Second leg

28 September 1963

Norwich Stars Ove Fundin 15 Olle Nygren 14 Terry Betts 10 John Debbage 6 Reg Trott 5 Billy Bales 4 Jimmy Gooch 3	57 – 27	Belle Vue Aces Sören Sjösten 7 Gordon McGregor 7 Cyril Maidment 6 John Dews 3 Jim Yacoby 2 Norman Nevitt 1 Ernie Baker 0

The Firs Stadium

Norwich were National Trophy Champions, winning on aggregate 90–78.

== Riders & final averages ==
Belle Vue

- (England) Dick Fisher 10.19
- (England) Peter Craven 10.13
- (Scotland) Gordon McGregor 8.67
- (Sweden) Sören Sjösten 7.77
- (England) Cyril Maidment 6.17
- (England) Jim Yacoby 2.87
- (England) Bill Powell 2.07
- (England) Norman Nevitt 2.00

Coventry

- (England) Nigel Boocock 9.84
- (Scotland) Ken McKinlay 8.99
- (England) Jim Lightfoot 7.31
- (England) Bryan Elliott 5.52
- (England) Ron Mountford 5.35
- (England) Les Owen 4.00
- (Australia) Jack Biggs 3.59
- (England) Peter Brough 3.05
- (England) Rick France 1.33
- (England) Howie Booton 0.80

Norwich

- (Sweden) Ove Fundin 10.71
- (Sweden) Olle Nygren 8.64
- (England) Terry Betts 8.39
- (England) Trevor Hedge 8.00
- (England) Jimmy Gooch 5.51
- (England) Billy Bales 4.65
- (England) Reg Trott 4.35
- (England) John Debbage 3.04

Oxford

- (England) Ronnie Genz 8.28
- (Australia) Jack Geran 7.39
- (Denmark) Arne Pander 6.83
- (Australia) Chum Taylor 6.00
- (England) Colin Gooddy 6.00
- (England) George Major 5.16
- (England) Alf Hagon 4.31
- (England) John Bishop 4.27
- (England) Danny Dunton 3.67

Southampton

- (Sweden) Björn Knutson 9.27
- (New Zealand) Barry Briggs 9.13
- (England) Dick Bradley 8.55
- (England) Alby Golden 6.17
- (England) Stan Stevens 5.78
- (Netherlands) Peter Vandenberg 5.58
- (England) Reg Luckhurst 5.05
- (England) Cyril Roger 4.93
- (England) Stuart Wallace 1.82

Swindon

- (Australia) Peter Moore 8.98
- (England) Mike Broadbank 8.74
- (Poland) Tadeusz Teodorowicz 6.57
- (England) Brian Brett 6.44
- (Australia) Neil Street 6.36
- (England) Martin Ashby 5.80
- (Wales) Ian Williams 5.01

Wimbledon

- (New Zealand) Ronnie Moore 10.17
- (England) Ron How 9.68
- (Norway) Sverre Harrfeldt 8.53
- (England) Bob Andrews 7.29
- (Wales) Leo McAuliffe 6.57
- (England) Roy Trigg 5.41
- (England) Gerald Jackson 4.71
- (England) Jim Tebby 4.44

== See also ==
- List of United Kingdom Speedway League Champions
- Knockout Cup (speedway)
