= 1964 Speedway National League =

British speedway season

- League: National League
- No. of competitors: 7
- Champions: Oxford Cheetahs
- National Trophy: Oxford Cheetahs
- Britannia Shield: Oxford Cheetahs
- London Cup: Wimbledon Dons
- Highest average: Ove Fundin
- Division/s below: 1964 Provincial League

The 1964 National League was the 30th season and the nineteenth post-war season of the highest tier of motorcycle speedway in Great Britain, but the final season of the National League being the highest tier.

== Summary ==
West Ham Hammers returned after a nine-year absence but the league stayed at seven competitors with the withdrawal of Southampton Saints. Oxford Cheetahs, who had finished bottom of the table in 1963, rose spectacularly up the league to win the title, a repeat of the feat they had accomplished at a lower level in 1950.

== Final table ==
Pos	Team	PL	W	D	L	Pts
1	Oxford Cheetahs	12	9	0	3	18
2	Coventry Bees	12	8	1	3	17
3	Norwich Stars	12	6	0	6	12
4	Belle Vue Aces	12	5	1	6	11
5	Swindon Robins	12	4	1	7	9
6	Wimbledon Dons	12	4	1	7	9
7	West Ham Hammers	12	4	0	8	8

On account of the small number of teams in the league meeting each other only once home and away, the Britannia Shield was run in a league format. Oxford Cheetahs came out on top.

== Fixtures and results ==
Home \ Away	BV	COV	NOR	OX	SWI	WH	WIM
Belle Vue		40–44	48–36	46–38	42–42	47–37	50–34
Coventry	45–39		44–40	51–33	51–33	45–39	42–42
Norwich	46–38	34.5–49.5		45–39	43–41	45–39	50–34
Oxford	53–31	52–32	48–36		45–39	50–34	54–30
Swindon	49–35	44–40	40–44	40–43		51–32	48–35
West Ham	38–45	44–40	46–38	39–44	43–41		50–34
Wimbledon	49–35	39–45	51–33	38–46	43–41	46–38	

Legend: Blue = home team win; Yellow = draw; Red = away team win.

== Britannia Shield table ==
Pos	Team	PL	W	D	L	Pts
1	Oxford Cheetahs	12	8	1	3	17
2	Coventry Bees	12	8	0	4	16
3	Belle Vue Aces	12	6	0	6	12
4	Swindon Robins	12	6	0	6	12
5	Norwich Stars	12	5	0	7	10
6	Wimbledon Dons	12	5	0	7	10
7	West Ham Hammers	12	3	1	8	7

== Fixtures and results ==
Home \ Away	BV	COV	NOR	OX	SWI	WH	WIM
Belle Vue		39–45	46–38	45–39	51–33	46–38	46–38
Coventry	45–39		57–27	49–35	51–33	50–34	53–31
Norwich	49–35	47–35		37–47	55–29	58–26	55–29
Oxford	46–38	48–36	55–29		53–31	54–30	47–37
Swindon	50–34	39–45	47–37	44–40		46–38	45–39
West Ham	39–45	44–40	43–40	42–42	45–39		41–42
Wimbledon	44–40	49–35	46–38	40–43	45–43	43–41	

Legend: Blue = home team win; Yellow = draw; Red = away team win.

== Top ten riders (league only) ==
	Rider	Nat	Team	C.M.A.
1	Ove Fundin	(Sweden)	Norwich Stars	10.71
2	Göte Nordin	(Sweden)	Wimbledon Dons	10.62
3	Barry Briggs	(New Zealand)	Swindon Robins	10.51
4	Nigel Boocock	(England)	Coventry Bees	10.44
5	Ken McKinlay	(Scotland)	Coventry Bees	9.92
6	Ron How	(England)	Oxford Cheetahs	9.84
7	Mike Broadbank	(England)	Swindon Robins	9.80
8	Sören Sjösten	(Sweden)	Belle Vue Aces	9.62
9	Björn Knutson	(Sweden)	West Ham Hammers	9.16
10	Dick Fisher	(England)	Belle Vue Aces	8.77

== National Trophy ==
The 1964 National Trophy was the 26th edition of the Knockout Cup. Oxford were the winners.

First round

Date	Team one	Score	Team two
03/07	Norwich	47-36	Oxford
25/06	Oxford	48-36	Norwich
13/06	Coventry	43-41	West Ham
09/06	West Ham	45-39	Coventry
17/08	Wimbledon	46-38	Swindon
08/08	Swindon	51-33	Wimbledon

Semi-finals

Date	Team one	Score	Team two
08/08	Belle Vue	32a-28a	Oxford
12/09	Belle Vue	46-38	Oxford
06/08	Oxford	49-35	Belle Vue
01/09	West Ham	51-33	Swindon
05/09	Swindon	43-41	West Ham

a=abandoned after 10 heats

=== Final ===
first leg

22 September 1964

West Ham Hammers Stan Stevens 11 Björn Knutson 9 Bengt Jansson 9 Reg Luckhurst 9 Ray Cresp 7 Malcolm Simmons 3 Norman Hunter 2 Alf Hagon 2	52–32	Oxford Cheetahs Ron How 8 Jimmy Gooch 7 Ronnie Genz 6 Arne Pander 4 Eddie Reeves 3 Colin Gooddy 2 John Bishop 2 Ted Ede 0

West Ham Stadium

second leg

24 September 1964

Oxford Cheetahs Colin Gooddy 10 Ron How 9 Jack Geran 8 Ronnie Genz 8 Arne Pander 7 Jimmy Gooch 5 Eddie Reeves 4 John Bishop 2	53–31	West Ham Hammers Björn Knutson 10 Bengt Jansson 7 Stan Stevens 5 Bob Dugard 5 Ray Cresp 2 Reg Luckhurst 1 Norman Hunter 1 Alf Hagon 0

Oxford Stadium

Oxford Cheetahs were declared National Trophy Champions, winning on aggregate 85-83.

== London Cup ==
Just two teams competed. Wimbledon won on aggregate 87–81

Team 1	Team 2	Score	Scorers	Scorers
Wimbledon	West Ham	47–37	Harrfeldt 10, Nordin 9, Jackson 9, Andrews 8, Tebby 5, McAuliffe 5, Whipp 1, Baker 0	Jansson 10, Knutson 9, Luckhurst 4 Dugard 4, Ray Cresp 3, Stevens 3, Hagon 3, Hunter 1
West Ham	Wimbledon	44–40	Knutson 12, Simmons 7, Luckhurst 7, Hunter 5, Hagon 3, Cresp 3, Jansson 3	Andrews 11, Nordin 6, McAuliffe 6, Tebby 6, Jackson 5, Stan Stevens 4, Harrfeldt 3, Baker 2, Whipp 2

== Riders & final averages ==
Belle Vue

- (Sweden) Sören Sjösten 9.62
- (England) Dick Fisher 8.77
- (England) Cyril Maidment 7.84
- (Scotland) Gordon McGregor 5.60
- (England) Jim Yacoby 4.47
- (England) Danny Dunton 3.50
- (England) Bill Powell 3.24
- (England) Norman Nevitt 3.11
- (England) Dave Schofield 2.00

Coventry

- (England) Nigel Boocock 10.44
- (Scotland) Ken McKinlay 9.92
- (England) Ron Mountford 7.31
- (England) Jim Lightfoot 7.10
- (England) Col Cottrell 5.14
- (England) Les Owen 5.00
- (England) Bryan Elliott 4.97
- (Australia) Jack Biggs 4.86
- (England) Rick France 4.74
- (England) Howie Booton 0.67

Norwich

- (Sweden) Ove Fundin 10.71
- (Sweden) Olle Nygren 8.65
- (England) David Crane 7.45
- (England) Trevor Hedge 7.68
- (England) Billy Bales 6.12
- (England) Tich Read (George Snailum) 4.69
- (Hungary) Sándor Lévai 4.57
- (England) George Major 4.00
- (England) Reg Trott 3.89
- (England) Cyril Crane 1.33
- (England) John Debbage 0.50

Oxford

- (England) Ron How 9.84
- (Denmark) Arne Pander 8.00
- (England) Jimmy Gooch 8.00
- (England) Ronnie Genz 7.27
- (England) Colin Gooddy 6.70
- (Australia) Jack Geran 6.47
- (England) John Bishop 4.57
- (England) Eddie Reeves 3.83
- (New Zealand) Colin McKee 3.67

Swindon

- (New Zealand) Barry Briggs 10.51
- (England) Mike Broadbank 9.80
- (England) Brian Brett 6.98
- (Poland) Tadeusz Teodorowicz 6.57
- (England) Martin Ashby 6.00
- (Wales) Leo McAuliffe 5.50
- (England) Bob Kilby 4.97
- (England) Roy Bowers 2.94
- (England) John Debbage 2.92
- (England) Mike Keen 2.40
- (England) Colin Pratt 2.33
- (Scotland) George Summers 1.78

West Ham

- (Sweden) Björn Knutson 9.16
- (England) Alf Hagon 7.08
- (Sweden) Bengt Jansson 6.93
- (England) Norman Hunter 6.38
- (England) Malcolm Simmons 6.33
- (England) Reg Luckhurst 6.33
- (England) Stan Stevens 5.45
- (Australia) Ray Cresp 5.03
- (England) Bob Dugard 3.68

Wimbledon

- (Sweden) Göte Nordin 10.62
- (England) Bob Andrews 6.88
- (Norway) Sverre Harrfeldt 6.87
- (Wales) Leo McAuliffe 7.06
- (England) Gerald Jackson 5.18
- (England) Keith Whipp 3.20
- (England) Jim Tebby 3.11
- (England) Roy Trigg 3.00
- (England) Ernie Baker 2.86

== See also ==
- List of United Kingdom Speedway League Champions
- Knockout Cup (speedway)
