= Pip Lamb =

English motorcycle speedway rider

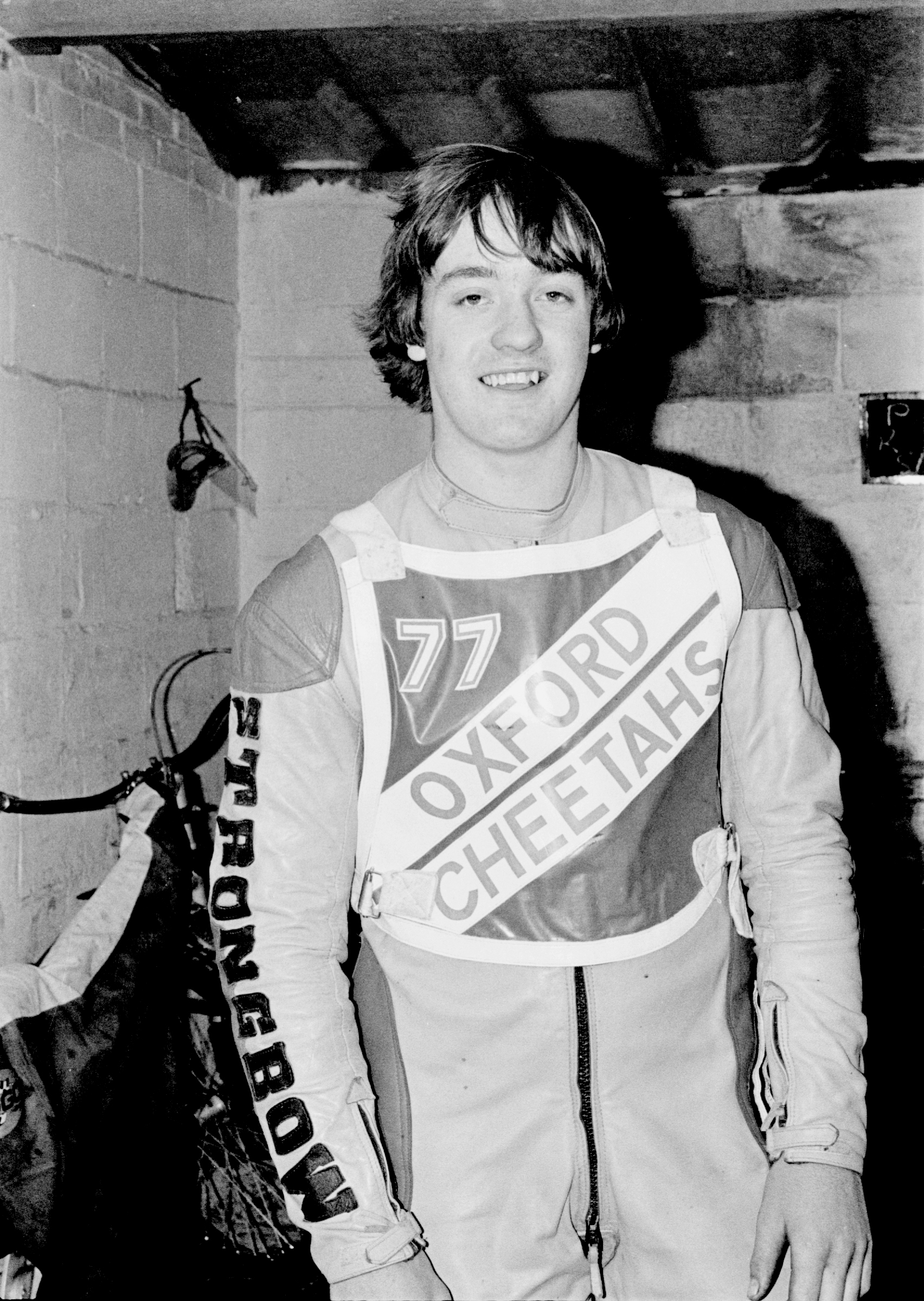
- Born: 11 February 1959; Hereford, England
- Nationality: British (English)

Career history
- 1976-1979: Oxford Cheetahs
- 1978: Coventry Bees
- 1978, 1979: Cradley Heathens
- 1978: Exeter Falcons

Phillip Derek Lamb (born 11 February 1959 in Hereford, England) is a former motorcycle speedway rider from England.

== Career ==
Before undertaking an oval track speedway career, Lamb rode in grasstrack events and was the winner of the Midland Center Championship.

Lamb started his career with the Oxford Cheetahs in 1976 and is most associated with that club. He also rode a few of times for Cradley Heath.

Lamb attended Peter Jarman's speedway school at Cowley Stadium in 1976. It was on the track at Cowley Stadium, Oxford on 21 June, where he had a career ending accident. An eyewitness described the accident as Lamb having mechanical failure, putting his hand up to signal retirement and drifting out to the fence. He was suddenly thrown forward from his bike as if his footrest had entangled with the wire link fencing, going head first into a steel post. Lamb fractured his spine in the accident.

In 2010, former multiple world champion Barry Briggs, aged 75, made a motorcycle journey around the United Kingdom to raise money for 12 ex-speedway riders who were now wheelchair users after racing accidents. They were Krzysztof Cegielski, Lawrence Hare, Neil Hewitt, Per Jonsson, Graham Miles, Paul Mitchell, Joe Owen, John Simmons, Gary Stead, Steve Weatherley, Alan Wilkinson, and Pip Lamb.
