= Harry Maclean =

Harry Maclean may refer to:

- Sir Harry Aubrey de Vere Maclean (1848–1920), Scottish soldier and instructor to the Moroccan Army
- Harry Maclean (speedway rider) (born 1951), Scottish motorcycle speedway rider
- Harry N. MacLean (born c. 1943), American writer and lawyer
