= Roy Sizmore =

English motorcycle racer (born 1950)

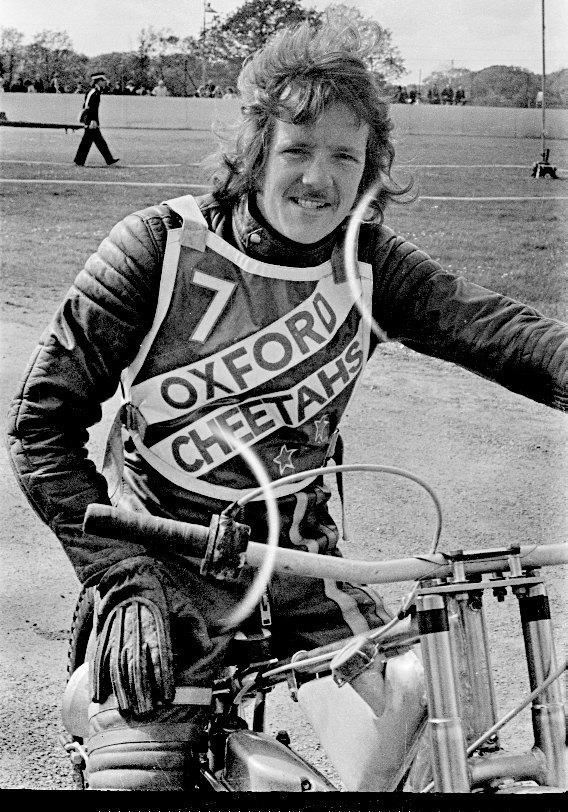
- Born: 17 November 1950 (age 75); Hillingdon, England

Career history
- 1973-1975: Peterborough Panthers
- 1973: Coventry Bees
- 1973, 1977: Reading Racers
- 1976-1977: Oxford Cheetahs
- 1977: Weymouth Wizards

Roy Sizmore (born 17 November 1950 in Hillingdon, England) is a former motorcycle speedway rider in National League (speedway) and Grasstrack rider.

== Career ==
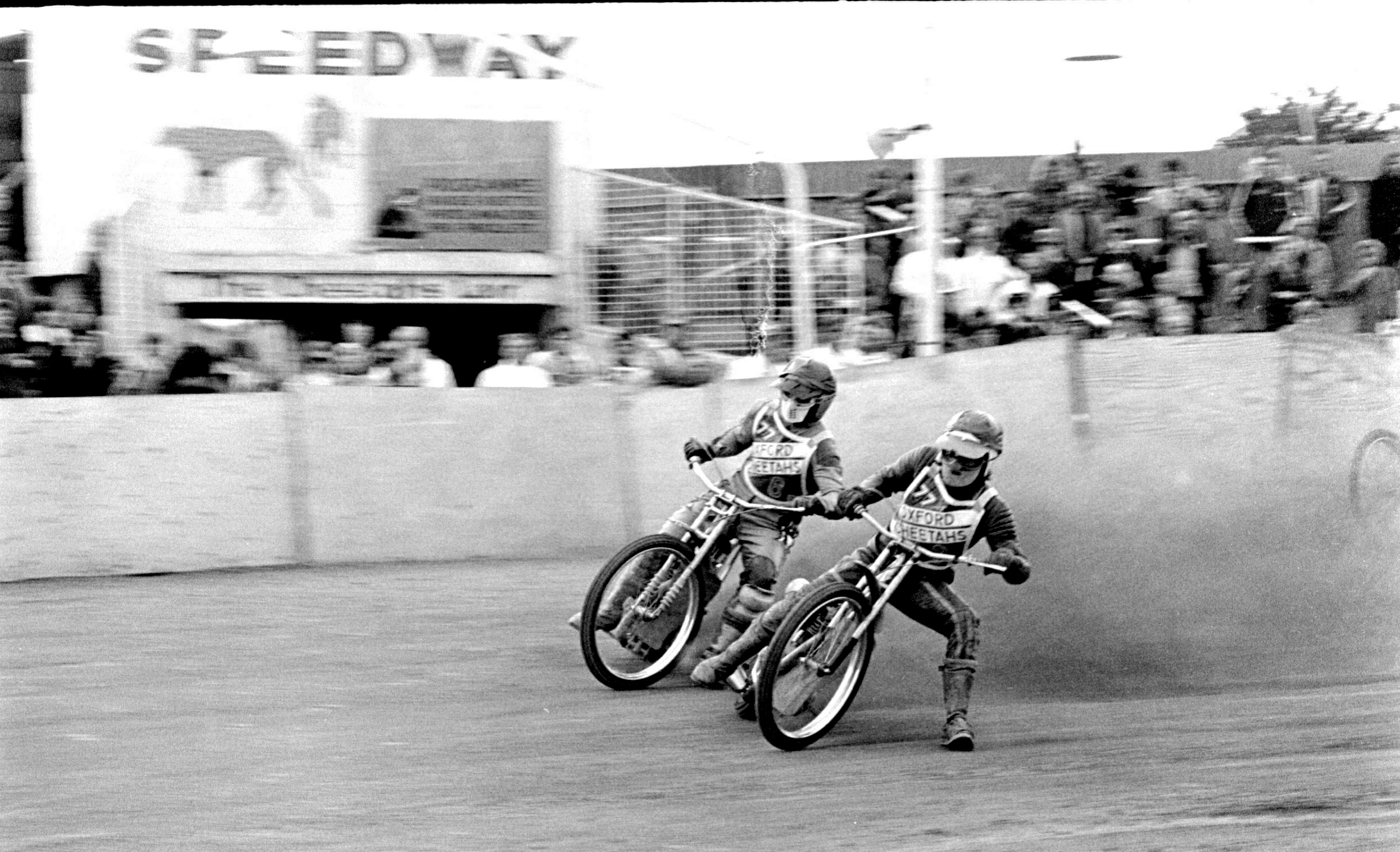
Oxford Cheetahs riders, Pip Lamb and Roy Sizmore

Sizmore career started his career in 1973 under promoter Danny Dunton at Peterborough Panthers and Reading Racers, he would ride for a number of clubs over the next four years, filling in when riders were injured as a popular replacement. His most appearances as a Club rider were with Peterborough Panthers 1975 -35 meetings, 121 rides, amassing 115 points.

As the 1975 season ended, Harry Bastable and Tony Allsopp, promoters at Stoke, moved the licence to Oxford for 1976, when Oxford Rebels moved to White City Stadium when it was feared the stadium would be demolished.

In 1976, Sizmore was released by Peterborough and during 1976 he rode for Oxford Cheetahs amassing 137 points from 34 meetings and 111 rides in 1976. After securing a full transfer from Peterborough to Oxford he competed for the latter during the 1977 season.

The following years were lean times and Sizmore retired at the end of 1977, only having had 11 rides for four different clubs. After speedway, Sizmore raced Grasstrack, becoming South Midland Centre Champion 1990 and third-placed British Best Pairs 1993 with Andy Gomm.
