= Rick Timmo =

New Zealand speedway rider

Frederick Timmo
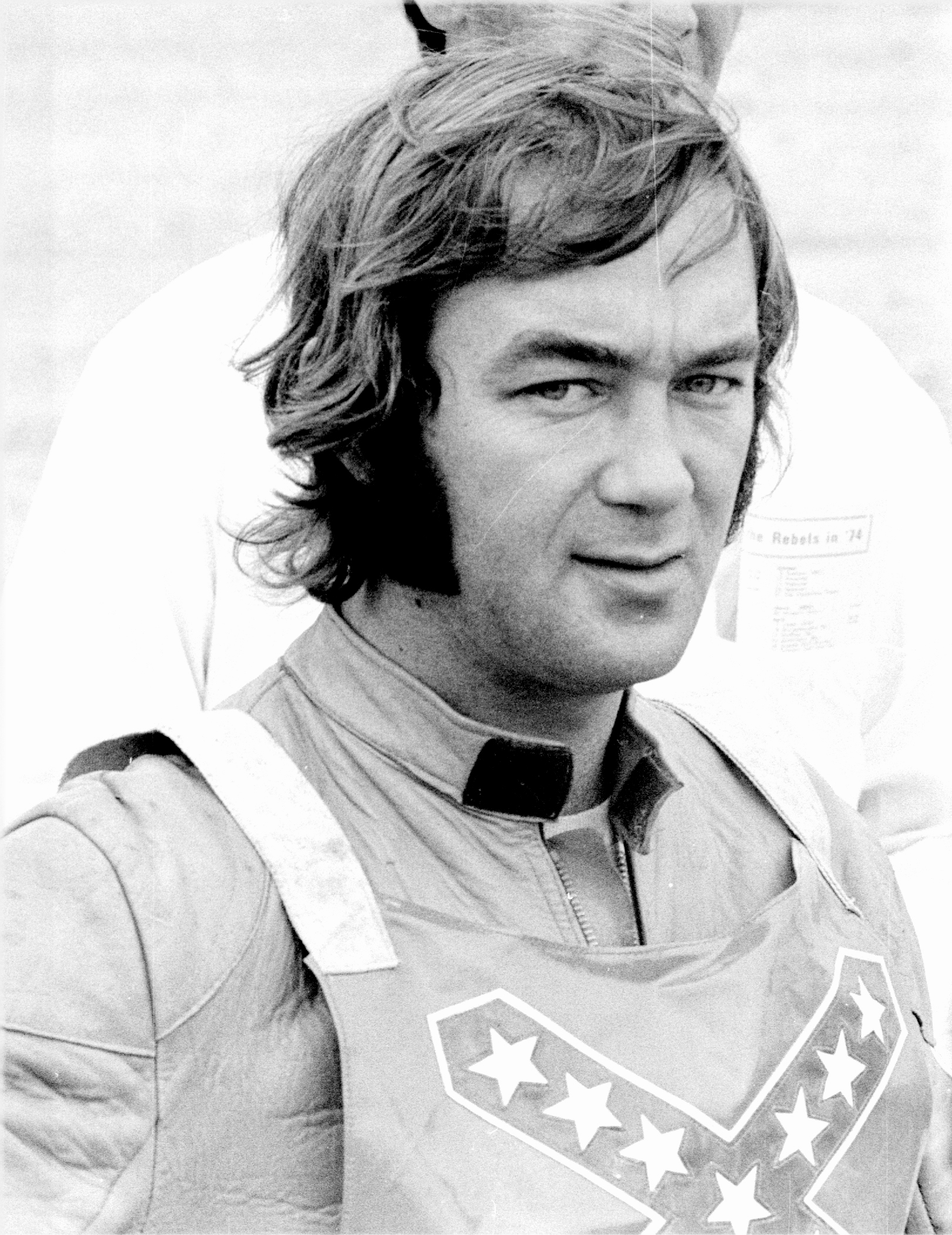
- Born: 27 July 1947; Napier, New Zealand
- Nationality: New Zealander

Career history
- 1967-1974: Oxford Cheetahs/Rebels

Frederick "Rick" Timmo (born 27 July 1947 in Napier, New Zealand) is a former motorcycle speedway rider. He earned 19 caps for the New Zealand national speedway team.

== Career ==
Timmo had his first rides at Napier, where he spent three years before being advised by Colin McKee to try his luck in England. McKee fixed a trial for Timmo at Hackney but promoter Danny Dunton signed him up for Oxford Cheetahs for the 1967 British League season. He stayed at Oxford for a number of years and became a fans favourite. Barry Briggs, another Kiwi, tried to tempt Timmo to ride for Swindon Robins, but he declined.

In the season 1968–69, Timmo toured with the British Lions in New Zealand. His performance made him a favourite and he would go on to ride for his home country against England, Australia and Sweden.

Timmo's career was prematurely ended when he had a nasty crash at a grasstrack meeting and broke his hip.

== Retirement ==
After retiring from speedway, Timmo returned home to Napier where he set up a business – Timmo Motorcycles. His son, Spencer, became a speedway rider for Mildenhall Fen Tigers and Newcastle Diamonds, and now races cars in the UK.

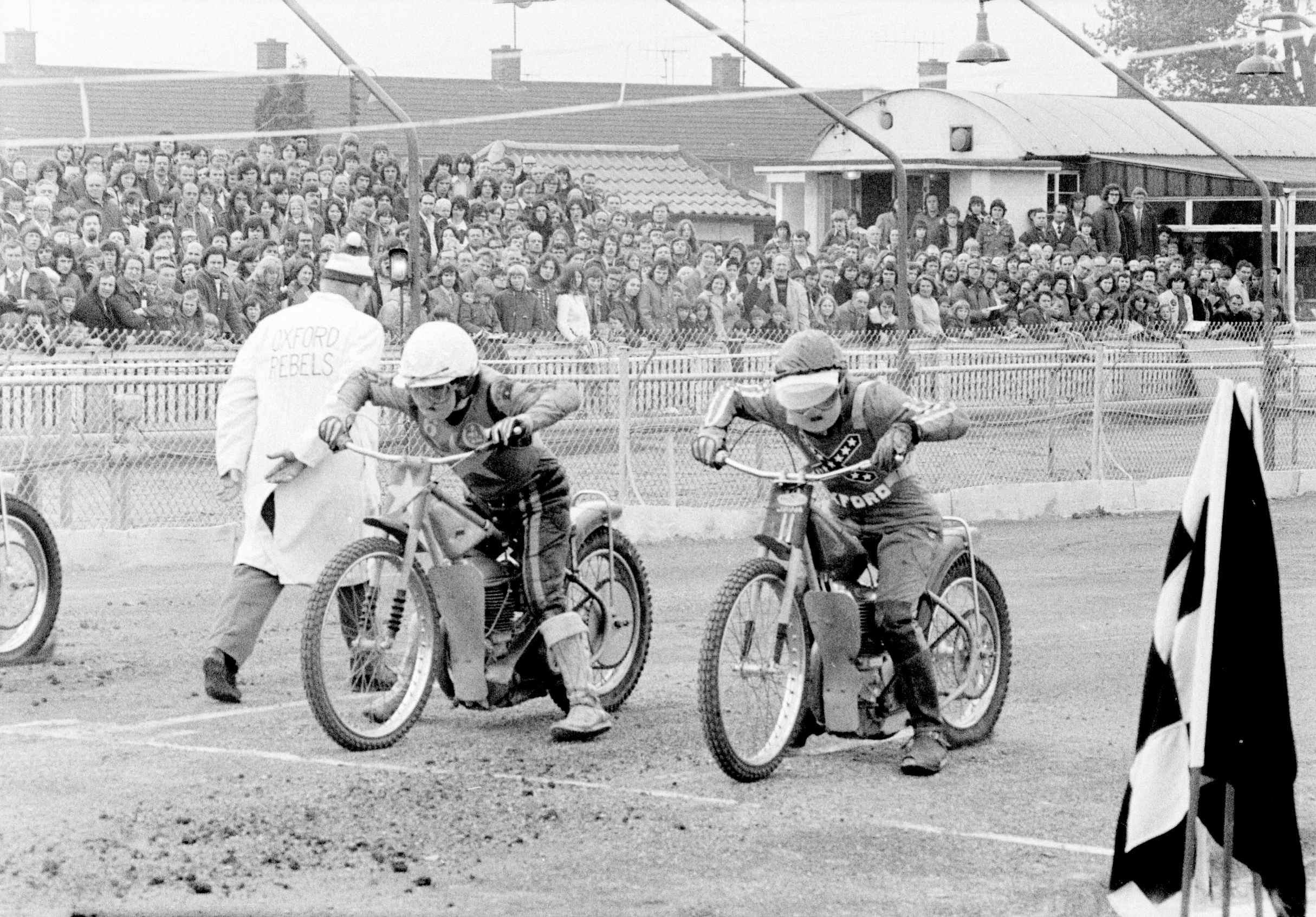
At the starting gate, Cowley Stadium, Oxford. 1974 match against Wimbledon Dons
