= 2024 National Development League speedway season =

Third tier of 2024 British speedway season

- League: National Development League
- Champions: Leicester Lion Cubs
- Knockout Cup: not held
- Riders' Championship: not held
- Highest average: Sam Hagon
- Division/s above: SGB Premiership 2024; SGB Championship 2024

The 2024 National Development League was the third division/tier of British motorcycle speedway for the 2024 season. It is a semi-professional development league, containing mainly the junior sides of SGB Premiership and SGB Championship clubs. Oxford Chargers were the defending champions having won the title in 2023. The league is sponsored by the World Speedway Riders' Association.

== Summary ==
Six clubs competed for the National Development League Championship, after the addition of Middlesbrough Tigers and a Scunthorpe Stags and Sheffield Prowlers combined team. The three teams that dropped out were Berwick Bullets, Kent Royals and Mildenhall Fen Tigers, while Workington Comets had moved up a division.

The league points limit was set at 36, later increased to 36.25, while all riders who achieved a Championship average higher than 4.00 in the past were unable to race in the National Development League. The playoff system was also scrapped, with the winners now being decided by whoever finished top of the league table during the regular season. The knockout cup was also not staged in 2024. In addition to the 2024 NDL league, all other senior teams were required to run a formal programme of second half racing called the National League Riders' Development Series.

Leicester Lion Cubs won the title.

Locations of the 2024 National Development League teams

== League ==
=== League table ===
Pos.	Club	M	Home			Away			F	A	B	Pts	+/−
Pos.	Club	M	W	SHL	L	W	SHL	L	F	A	B	Pts	+/−
1	Leicester Lion Cubs (C)	10	5	0	0	4	0	1	512	382	5	23	+130
2	Belle Vue Colts	10	4	0	1	2	0	3	469	423	3	15	+46
3	Oxford Chargers	10	3	0	2	3	0	2	461	430	3	15	+31
4	Monarchs Academy	10	3	0	2	1	0	4	419	472	2	10	-53
5	Scunthorpe/Sheffield	10	2	0	3	1	0	4	415	481	1	7	-66
6	Middlesbrough Tigers	10	2	0	3	0	0	5	404	492	1	5	-88

Fixtures & results

Home \ Away	BEL	EDI	LEI	MID	OXF	S/S
Belle Vue		56–34	38–49	51–39	48–42	55–35
Edinburgh	35–53		47–42	52–37	44–45	58–31
Leicester	53–37	56–34		55–35	47–41	63–27
Middlesbrough	48–41	44–46	36–54		41–49	48–41
Oxford	49–40	51–36	43–47	55–34		36–54
Scunthorpe/Sheffield	39–50	57–33	44–46	48–42	39–50	

Legend: Blue = home team win; Yellow = draw; Red = away team win.

== NDL Riders Development Series ==
Three National League Riders Development Series events took place across the 2024 NDL Series. These were hosted by Poole, Leicester and Berwick.

Date	Venue	Winner	2nd	3rd
NDL Development Series
26 June	Poole	Sam Hagon	Jake Mulford	Joe Thompson
4 August	Leicester	Joe Thompson	William Cairns	Vinnie Foord
7 September	Berwick	Freddy Hodder	Connor Coles	Jake Mulford

== Leading averages ==
	Rider	Team	Average
1	(England) Sam Hagon	Belle Vue	11.03
2	(England) William Cairns	Belle Vue	10.67
3	(England) Joe Thompson	Leicester	10.37
4	(Australia) Luke Killeen	Oxford	9.96
5	(England) Ben Trigger	Middlesbrough	8.98
6	(England) Jake Mulford	Middlesbrough	8.86
7	(England) Jason Garrad	Oxford	8.73
8	(England) Jody Scott	Oxford	8.68
9	(England) Nathan Ablitt	Sheffield/Scunthorpe	8.56
10	(England) Connor Coles	Edinburgh	8.42

- averages include all league fixtures, min 4 matches

== Squads & final averages ==
=== Belle Vue Colts ===
- (England) Sam Hagon 11.03
- (England) William Cairns 10.67
- (England) Freddy Hodder 7.82
- (Australia) Matt Marson 7.00
- (England) Chad Wirtzfeld 5.87
- (England) Harry McGurk 5.33
- (England) Luke Muff 2.22
- (England) Jack Shimelt 1.55

=== Edinburgh Monarchs Academy ===
- (England) Connor Coles 8.42
- (Australia) Dayle Wood 8.08
- (England) Max Perry 7.40
- (England) Sam McGurk 6.56
- (Scotland) Mason Watson 6.24
- (England) Kyran Lyden 3.91
- (England) Mark Parker 2.27

=== Leicester Lion Cubs ===
- (England) Joe Thompson (C) 10.37
- (England) Max James 8.30
- (England) Vinnie Ford 7.86
- (England) Tom Spencer 7.80
- (England) Sonny Springer 6.70
- (England) Arran Butcher 6.63
- (England) Luke Crang 6.42

=== Middlesbrough Tigers ===
- (England) Ben Trigger 8.98
- (England) Jake Mulford 8.86
- (England) Danny Phillips 6.60
- (England) Jamie Halder 6.38
- (England) Kai Ward 4.42
- (England) Ben Rathbone 4.30
- (England) William Hocaniuk 2.63

=== Oxford Chargers ===
- (Australia) Luke Killeen (C) 9.96
- (England) Jason Garrad 8.73
- (England) Jody Scott 8.68
- (England) Ashton Vale 6.86
- (England) Jacob Clouting 6.09
- (Australia) Declan Killeen 5.50
- (England) Senna Summers 4.56
- (England) Alex Spooner 2.86

=== Scunthorpe Stags/Sheffield Prowlers ===
- (England) Nathan Ablitt 8.56
- (England) Luke Harrison 8.00
- (Scotland) Ace Pijper 7.02
- (Scotland) Stene Pijper 5.91
- (England) Mickie Simpson 5.76
- (England) Sheldon Davies 4.57
- (England) Kean Dicken 4.44
- (England) Jamie Etherington 3.00

== See also ==
- List of United Kingdom speedway league champions
- Knockout Cup (speedway)
