= Donnington, Oxfordshire =

Coordinates: 51.738°N 1.234°W

Donnington
- Location within Oxfordshire
- OS grid reference: SP527044
- Civil parish: unparished
- District: Oxford
- Shire county: Oxfordshire
- Region: South East
- Country: England
- Sovereign state: United Kingdom
- Post town: Oxford
- Postcode district: OX4
- Dialling code: 01865
- Police: Thames Valley
- Fire: Oxfordshire
- Ambulance: South Central
- UK Parliament: Oxford East

Donnington is a small housing estate in Oxford, England located adjacent to the River Thames in the post-war housing developments either side of Donnington Bridge and around Boundary Brook Road. It is bordered by Iffley Village to the south, Iffley Fields to the north and Cowley to the east.

The City of Oxford Rowing Club is based by the Donnington Bridge.

== People ==
The speedway rider George Major was born in Donnington
