= Nigel Sparshott =

British speedway rider

- Born: 2 September 1961; Swanley, Kent, England
- Died: 10 July 1998 (aged 36); Swanley, Kent, England
- Nationality: British (English)

Career history
- 1978: Crayford Kestrels
- 1979-1980, 1982, 1988: Milton Keynes Knights
- 1980-1981: Kings Lynn Stars
- 1982-1983: Birmingham Brummies
- 1983-1985, 1987: Oxford Cheetahs
- 1983: Eastbourne Eagles
- 1985: Exeter Falcons
- 1986: Wimbledon Dons
- 1987, 1992-1993: Long Eaton Invaders
- 1988-1989: Middlesbrough Tigers/Bears
- 1990: Rye House Rockets

Individual honours
- 1986: The Laurels

Team honours
- 1980: Gauntlet Gold Cup

Nigel Sparshott (2 September 1961 – 10 July 1998) was an English speedway rider.

== Speedway career ==
Sparshott began his career at Crayford in 1978 before joining Milton Keynes Knights in 1979. The following year, he signed for King's Lynn Stars who rode in the top tier of British Speedway during the 1980 British League season. When the 1981 season started, he was riding for Milton Keynes when he was recalled for parent side King's Lynn. Following a full season with Milton Keynes in 1982, he came to the attention of the Oxford Cheetahs who signed him for the 1983 season.

It was the 1984 season that saw the Oxford Cheetahs famously break the British transfer records as they started the season in the 1984 British League season, they bought Hans Nielsen for a record £30,000, Simon Wigg for £25,000, Marvyn Cox for £15,000 and Melvyn Taylor for £12,000. Sparshott retained his place in the team his place at number 7. The following year in 1985, he was rarely used during the 1985 season as he spent most of the season at Exeter Falcons on loan but he earned his place in history as Oxford won the league and cup double.

In 1987, Sparshott signed as the number 1 rider for Long Eaton Invaders and would later spend two more seasons with the club from 1992 to 1993 until his retirement after the 1993 season.

== Death ==
In 1998, Sparshott died after his van crashed into a barn.
