= Nigel De'ath =

British speedway rider

- Born: 19 May 1965 (age 61); Bicester, Oxfordshire, England
- Nationality: British (English)

Career history
- 1983–1988: Oxford Cheetahs
- 1984–1985, 1989, 1991: Milton Keynes Knights
- 1990: Long Eaton Invaders

Team honours
- 1986: British League Champion
- 1986 (shared): British League KO Cup Winner
- 1986 (shared): British League Cup
- 1985, 1986: Midland Cup

Nigel De'ath (born 19 May 1965) is a former speedway rider from England.

== Speedway career ==
De'ath rode in the top tier of British Speedway from 1983–1990, riding primarily for Oxford Cheetahs.

De'ath rode for Milton Keynes Knights from 1984 to 1985. and after signing for Oxford, was an integral part of the Oxford team that won the league and Cup treble during the 1986 British League season.
