= Carl Askew =

Australian speedway rider

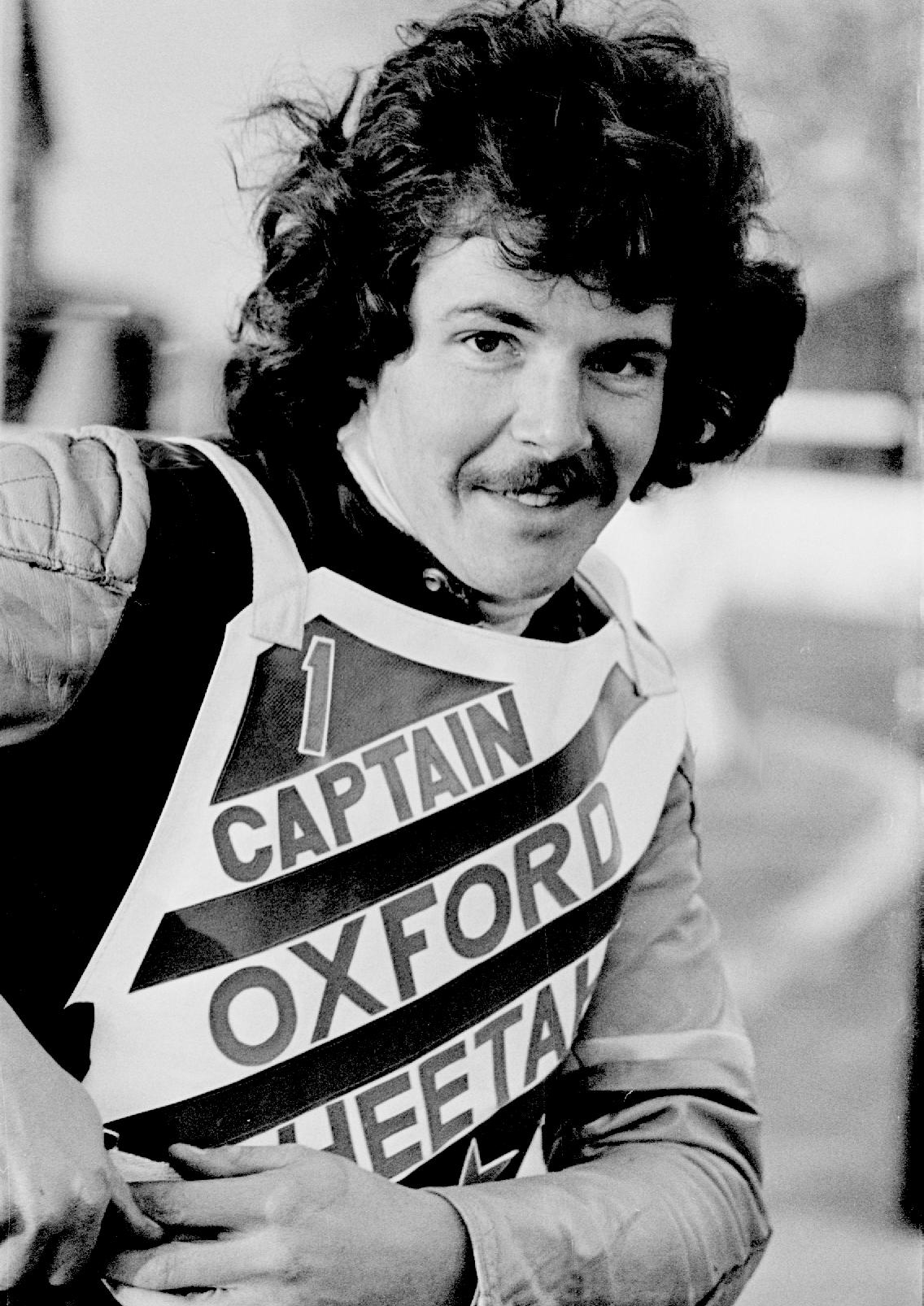
- Born: 19 November 1952 (age 74); Sydney, New South Wales
- Nationality: Australia

Career history
- 1974–1977: Birmingham Brummies
- 1975, 1979: Wolverhampton Wolves
- 1975, 1979: Cradley United/Heathens
- 1975: Sheffield Tigers
- 1976,1978-1979: Oxford Cheetahs
- 1977: Stoke Potters

Individual honours
- 1972: NSW 500cc Champion; Short Circuit aka Dirt Track

Team honours
- 1974: British League Div Two Winner
- 1974: British League Div Two KO Cup Winner
- 1975: New National League Champion

Carl Sydney Askew (born 19 November 1952 in Sydney, New South Wales) is an Australian former motorcycle speedway rider and a drag bike rider.

== Career ==
Askew rode in the United Kingdom for the Oxford Cheetahs in 1976 and 1978 and the Birmingham Brummies. Askew retired in October 1979.

Askew worked as a mechanic for a short time in 1980, upon return to Australia from UK. Between 1981 and 1993, he worked as a sales rep selling motorcycle spares and accessories. From 1993 till 1994, Askew managed Fraser Motorcycles workshop, which is a company which imported Harley Davidson motorcycles to Australia. Askew operated his own bike shop between 1994 and 2000, then restored motorcycles until 2004. He has owned and run Southern Highlands Mower Centre since 2004.

After he stopped racing in the UK, Askew rode for another couple of years in Australia. Ivan Mauger asked Askew if he would like to ride in some of his Long Track meetings; he rode one of his George Wenn engined two valvers for a few years, winning his first race after 13 years of retirement. After he stopped riding the classic LongTrack, Askew rode a Drag Bike, 1428cc Nitros injected Suzuki. The fastest speed he ever hit was 7.9 sec at 180 mph over a ¼ mile stretch.

== Personal life ==
Askew lives in Bundanoon, with wife Rachael, daughter Rose, and son Jacob.

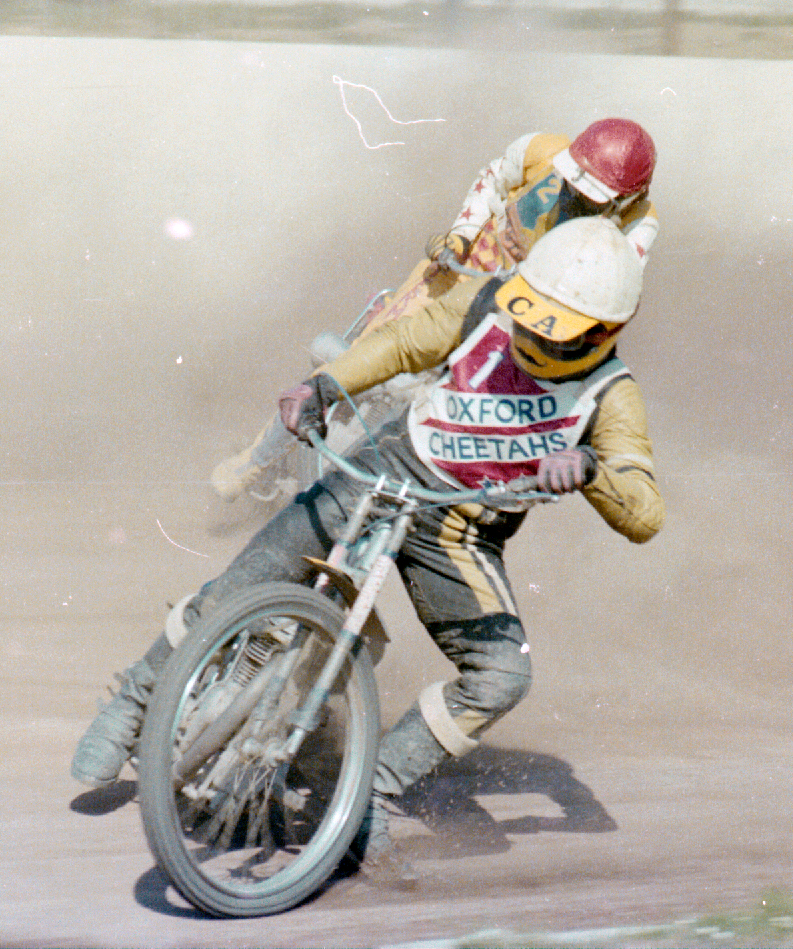
Carl Askew against an Eastbourne Eagle
