= Robert Dugard =

English motorcycle speedway rider and promoter

Bob Dugard
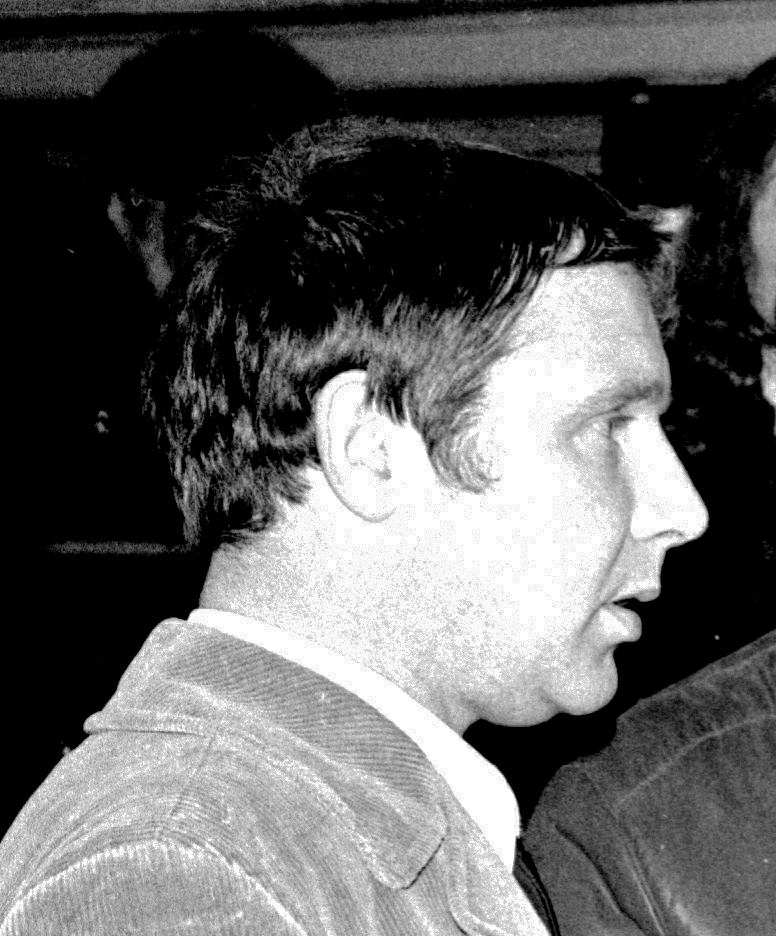
- Born: 12 July 1942; Hove, England
- Died: 5 August 2018 (aged 76)
- Nationality: British (English)

Career history
- 1959: Eastbourne Eagles
- 1960: Oxford Cheetahs
- 1962: Ipswich Witches
- 1963: New Cross Rangers
- 1964–1965: West Ham Hammers
- 1965–1970: Wimbledon Dons

Team honours
- 1968, 1969: British League KO Cup Winner
- 1968, 1969: London Cup
- 1959: Southern Area League

Robert Leonard Dugard (3 July 1942 – 5 August 2018), better known as Bob Dugard. was a motorcycle speedway rider and promoter from England.

== Biography ==
Dugard raced for various clubs during his racing career, starting with Eastbourne Eagles in 1959, followed by Oxford Cheetahs in 1960, Ipswich Witches in 1963 and then the three London clubs of New Cross Rangers, West Ham Hammers and Wimbledon Dons until retiring in 1970.

After retiring from racing, Dugard joined Danny Dunton in a new company – Oxspeed Ltd – as co-promoter of Oxford Rebels at Sandy Lane, losing the name Oxford Cheetahs. Another director of the company was the jazz musician Acker Bilk. Dugard and Dunton promoted speedway at Oxford until the stadium was under threat from development and they first sought a new location at Harringay before settling at White City.

For a long time associated with Eastbourne Eagles, Dugard was active for many years – reputed as being happiest on the tractor and grading the track between races, yet still involved with the management and working alongside his son Martin Dugard and other family members. In November 1974, as the director of Eastbourne he threatened to withdraw from the British league unless revisions were made.

Dugard was the owner of Arlington Stadium and away from the track he was a successful businessman as a director of Machine Tools in Hove. In later years he underwent heart surgery and was diagnosed with cancer. Bob is survived by his wife Margaret, three children, a step daughter and eight grandchildren.
