= Colin Meredith =

English speedway rider

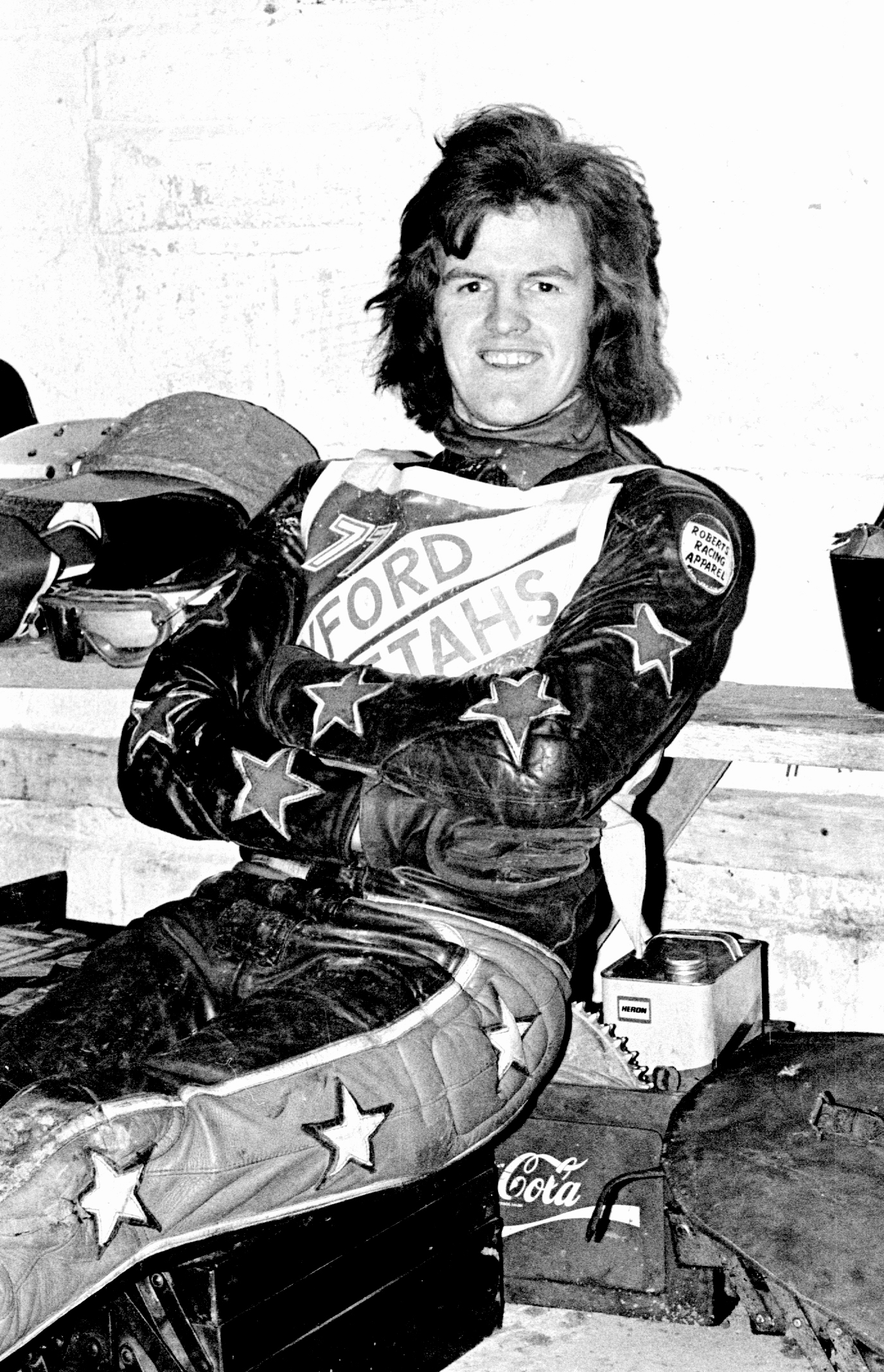
- Born: 24 January 1953 (age 73); Hereford, England
- Nationality: British (English)

Career history
- 1971: Rochdale Hornets
- 1972–1975: Bradford Northern/Barons
- 1972–1976: Wolverhampton Wolves
- 1976: Stoke Potters
- 1976–1979: Oxford Cheetahs
- 1978: Leicester Lions

Colin Trevor Meredith (born 24 January 1953) is a former motorcycle speedway rider from England, who later became a team manager and track curator.

== Biography ==
Born in Hereford, Meredith first rode a speedway bike on Ainsdale Sands in 1970, and after second half rides at Belle Vue made his league debut in the second division with Rochdale Hornets in 1971. In 1972, he rode for Bradford Northern in the second division and Wolverhampton Wolves in the first and continued this doubling-up arrangement until 1975. In 1974, he was selected in the Young England team against Czechoslovakia and Poland, and reached the Second Division Riders Final that year, finishing in seventh place. He rode again for Young England in 1975, against Scotland. In 1976, he rode for Wolves, Stoke Potters and Oxford Cheetahs, and went on to ride for Oxford for the next three seasons. In 1978, he also doubled up in the British League with Leicester Lions on loan, but his season was cut short after a crash at Peterborough. He retired from racing in 1979.

Meredith went on to become a track curator, working at Leicester and then at Coventry Bees for seventeen years up to 1998, also acting as team manager of the Bees for two years. From 1999 to 2002, he was team manager and track curator at Oxford Cheetahs, leading them to the Elite League title in 2001. In 2003, he became curator of the Peterborough Panthers track at the East of England Showground. He later took over responsibility for the Belle Vue track. He went on to become an official for the Speedway Control Bureau.
