= Pat Clark =

British speedway rider (1927–2011)

- Born: 25 July 1927; Plaistow, Newham
- Died: July 2011 (aged 83); Oxford, England
- Nationality: British (English)

Career history
- 1949: Rayleigh Rockets
- 1950–1952, 1956: Oxford Cheetahs
- 1952–1954: West Ham Hammers

Individual honours
- 1950: Division Three League Riders' Champion

Team honours
- 1950: National League Division Three
- 1950: National Trophy (Div 3 final)

Patrick Joseph Gerrard Clark commonly spelt Clarke (25 July 1927 – July 2011) was a motorcycle speedway rider from England.

== Career ==
Clark started racing in the British leagues during the 1949 Speedway National League Division Three season, when riding for the newly formed Rayleigh Rockets. He recorded a 6.50 points average for the season, riding 48 times for the club.

Oxford Cheetahs, who had finished bottom of the table during their inaugural league season in 1949, signed an entirely new set of riders including Pat Clark from Rayleigh for £250; others included Harry Saunders, signed as captain from Tamworth for £750, Bill Osborne from Walthamstow, Raymond Buster Brown from Wembley and Eric Irons from Cradley. The team rose spectacularly up the league to win the league and cup double.

Clark established himself as a leading rider in the division and went on to win the National League Division Three Riders' Championship and finish third in the league averages. His brother Colin Clark had also joined Oxford during the season.

The following season in 1951, Clark and Oxford competed in division 2, he only made two appearances but recorded an extraordinary 11.43 average. He would also become the Oxford captain. His exploits attracted the attention of West Ham Hammers from the top division and Clark doubled up with Oxford and West Ham during 1952. He averaged a respectable 6.41 for West Ham and improved to 7.53 the following year.

After a moderate season for West Ham in 1954, Clark was practicing for Oxford on 3 April 1955, ready for the 1955 season when he crashed and suffered serious injuries. He fractured his skull, jaw and nose and subsequently missed the entire season. He returned to Oxford in 1956, which was his final season before he retired.

At retirement, Clark had earned two international caps for the England national speedway team.
