= Jordan Jenkins (speedway rider) =

English speedway rider

- Born: 2 August 2001 (age 25); Norwich, Norfolk
- Nationality: British (English)

Career history
- 2016–2018, 2021: Mildenhall Fen Tigers
- 2019: Birmingham Brummies
- 2019: Kent Kings
- 2020–2022: Redcar Bears
- 2022–2023: Peterborough Panthers
- 2022–2025: Oxford Cheetahs
- 2024–2025: Ipswich Witches

Individual honours
- 2022: NDL rider's champion

Team honours
- 2025: tier 1 league champion
- 2021, 2023: NDL tier 3 champions

Jordan David Jenkins (born 2 August 2001) is an English speedway rider who rides in all three tiers of British Speedway.

== Career ==
Jenkins began his British career riding for the Mildenhall Fen Tigers in 2016. He rode for Kent Kings during 2019, although he did ride a couple of meetings for Birmingham in the division above.

Jenkins was made captain of the Mildenhall Fen Tigers in 2021 and led the team to the National Development League Championship.

For the 2022 season, Jenkins signed for the newly reformed Oxford Cheetahs National Development team called the Oxford Chargers and was made captain of the team. In September 2022, he won the National League Riders' Championship. Also in 2022, he continued to ride for the Redcar Bears and signed for the Peterborough Panthers in the top tier SGB Premiership mid-way through the season. He was named the Redcar Bears rider of the year.

In 2023, Jenkins left Redcar and signed for the Oxford Cheetahs for the SGB Championship 2023 and remained with the Chargers (as the team captain) for the 2023 NDL season. He also re-signed for Peterborough as their rising star for the SGB Premiership 2023. He won the NDL league title with Oxford Chargers, defeating Leicester in a one-off Grand Final. Fans voted him the 2023 Oxford Chargers Rider of the Year.

Jenkins re-signed for the Oxford Cheetahs for the 2024 season and also took his place in the Premiership with Ipswich Witches. Despite an injury hit season in 2024, he returned to both the Oxford Cheetahs and Ipswich for 2025. In 2025, despite an injury hit season, he helped Ipswich win the SGB Premiership 2025.
