= Oxford Cheetahs =

British motorcycle speedway team

Club information
- Track address: Oxford Stadium; Sandy Lane; Cowley, Oxford
- Country: England
- Founded: 1939
- Promoter: Jamie Courtney
- Team manager: Peter Schroeck
- Team captain: Sam Masters
- League: SGB Premiership; SGB Championship; National Development League
- Website: Official Website

Club facts
- Colours: Blue and yellow
- Track size: 297 metres (325 yd)
- Track record time: 56.2 seconds
- Track record date: 13 October 1988
- Track record holder: Hans Nielsen

Current senior team
Rider	CMA
(Australia) Sam Masters	10.09
(Australia) Mitchell McDiarmid	5.18
(Germany) Erik Riss	7.12
(England) Anders Rowe	7.38
(Australia) Luke Killeen	5.15
(England) Darryl Ritchings	2.29
(Australia) Dayle Wood	2.18
Total	39.39

Current junior team
Rider	CMA
(England) Jody Scott
(England) Darryl Ritchings
(England) Senna Summers
(England) Ashton Vale
(England) Mason Watson
(England) Harry Fletcher
(England) Max Broadhurst

Major team honours
United Kingdom Champions	1964, 1985, 1986, 1989, 2001
Knockout Cup Winners	1964, 1985, 1986 (shared)
UK tier 3 winners	1950, 2023, 2025
National Trophy tier 3 winners	1950
Premier League Fours	1994, 1996
Gold Cup Winners	1989
League Cup Winners (shared)	1986
Premiership Winners	1987
Midland Cup Winners	1975, 1985, 1986
British League Pairs Winners	1985, 1986, 1987
Britannia Shield Winners	1964
Craven Shield Winners	2005
SGB Championship Pairs Winners	2026

The Oxford Cheetahs are a British speedway team based at Oxford Stadium, in Oxford, England. They were founded in 1939 and are five times champions of Britain, in 1964, 1985, 1986, 1989 and 2001. The club folded in 2007 but returned to racing when participating in the SGB Championship 2022.

During their history they have run under several other names; from 1972 to 1975, they were known as Oxford Rebels and from 2003 to 2005, they were known as Oxford Silver Machine. They have also run junior sides known as the Oxford Cubs, Oxford Silver Machine Academy, Oxford Lions and Oxford Chargers. In 2024 and 2025 the club ran two teams in addition to the Cheetahs, one under a new guise of the Oxford Spires in the Premiership and the Chargers in the development league. In 2026 the Spires dropped out of the Premiership and only the Cheetahs and Chargers will compete.

== History ==
=== Origins and 1940s ===
The Oxford Motorcycle Speedway Club moved to Oxford Stadium in 1939 from a grass circuit in Sandford-on-Thames. The Secretary Ted Mander orchestrated the move and the first individual meeting was held on Easter Saturday 8 April 1939 won by Roy Duke. The club contested team meetings against Smallford, Wisbech, High Beech and Reading.

Racing resumed on 28 April 1940, with guest teams racing. This was followed by just two meetings in 1941 before Mander announced that racing would be suspended for the duration of the World War II. Despite the war ending in 1945 there was no racing from 1942 to 1948. However, during 1948 the stadium owner Leslie Calcutt unsuccessfully applied to the Speedway Control Board for a licence to race in the Third Division.

Following major track renovations in 1949, the club joined the 1949 Speedway National League Division Three. The club took the nickname 'Cheetahs' following a competition for the general public, held by the local Oxford Mail newspaper. The team manager was Ron Bear and the club colours were dark blue and yellow, with the first match being an away fixture at Exeter on 18 April 1949. Oxford lost heavily 60–24 and three days later lost to Hastings 47–37 in their first home fixture. The Cheetahs finished in last place during their inaugural season and used 24 different riders.

=== 1950s ===
The Cheetahs went from finishing last in 1949 to winning the division 3 league and cup double in 1950 and were subsequently promoted to Division two in 1951. Pat Clark was the team's number 1 rider, hitting a season average of 9.99.

After finishing bottom of the division two in 1952 they rode in the third division called the Southern League in 1953 but following a league restructure, which included the signing of Ronnie Genz, the Cheetahs returned to division two in 1954.

Following a league merger the Cheetahs rode in the top tier for the first time in 1957. The team continued to race in the top tier but did not manage to gain any notable success.

=== 1960s ===
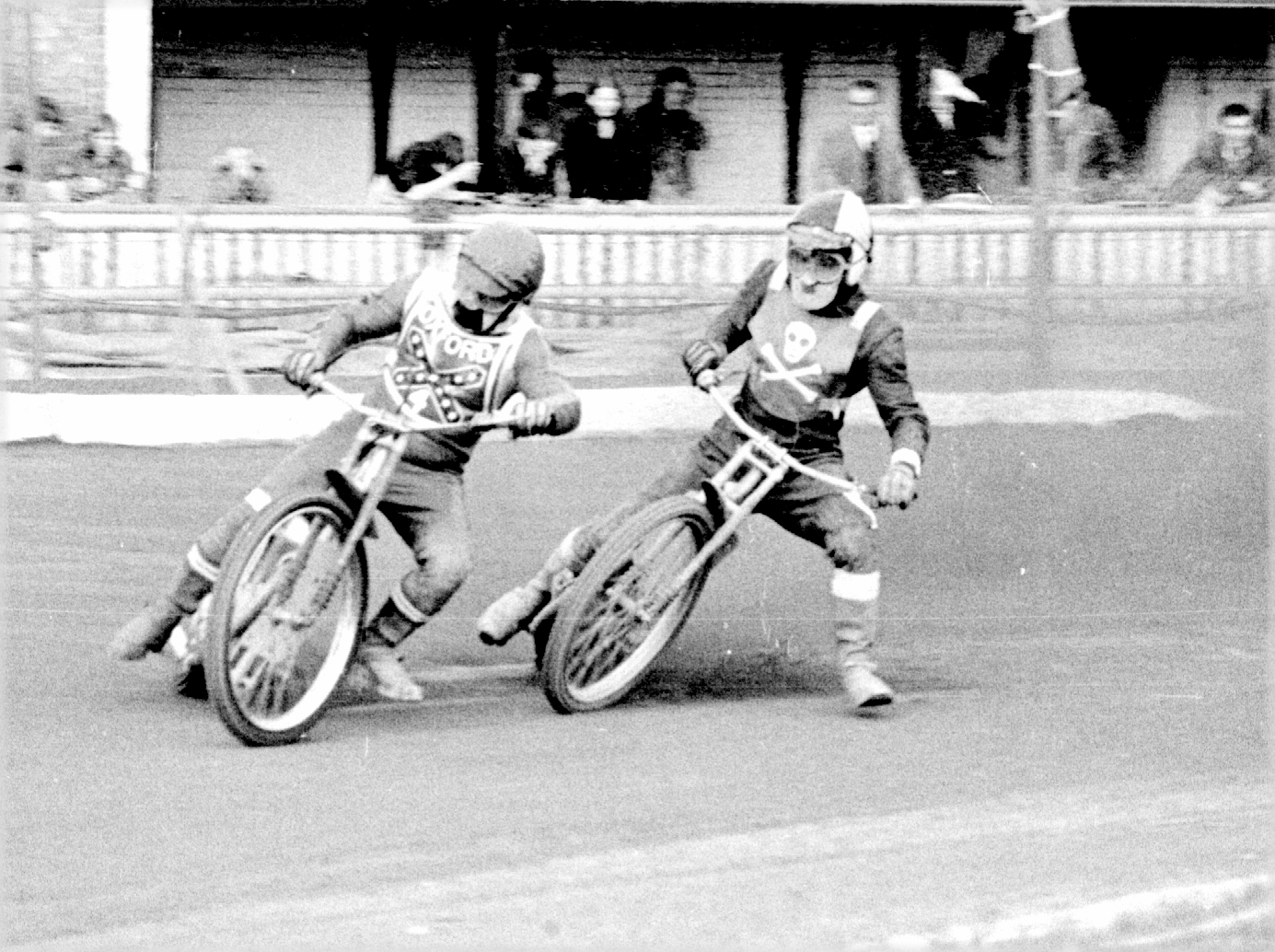
Colin Gooddy in action at Oxford Stadium

The Cheetahs headed Arne Pander record a third place finish in 1960 and then after struggling in the top division for several years they dramatically won the top-tier league for the first time in 1964 despite finishing last the season before with many of the same riders. The winning team consisted of Ron How, Arne Pander, Jimmy Gooch, Ronnie Genz, Colin Gooddy, Jack Geran, Colin McKee, Eddie Reeves and John Bishop. They also completed a treble by winning the National Trophy and Britannia Shield.

The team failed to emulate the success in the following season, primarily due to the creation of the British League and a division of 18 teams, which forced members of the team to depart under the Speedway Control Board rules. The results suffered and towards the end of the sixties, the team struggled.

=== 1970s ===
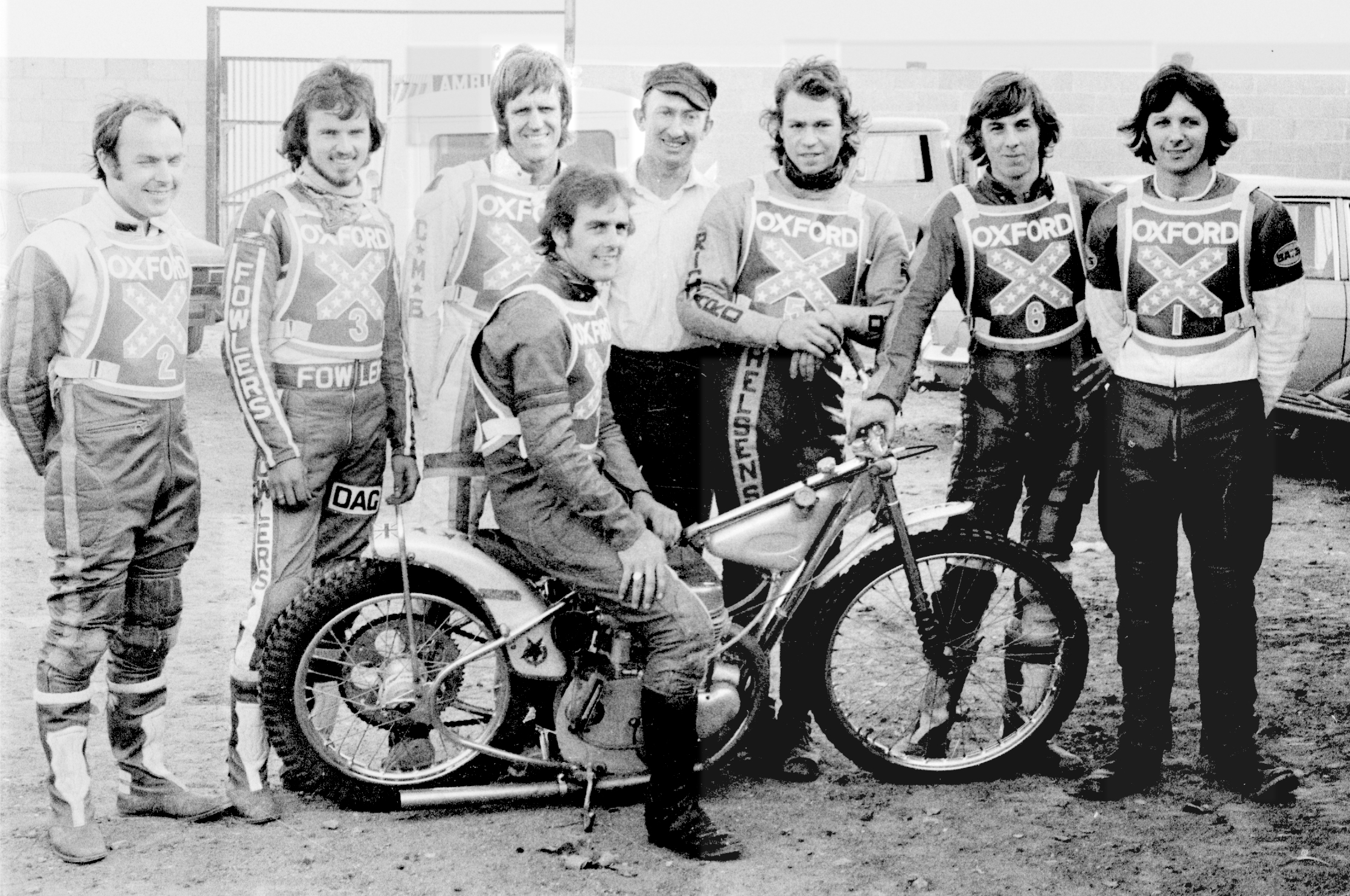
Oxford in 1975, when they raced using the unpopular Rebels name.

In 1972, the club was rebranded, the Cheetahs became the Oxford Rebels and the stadium renamed as Cowley Stadium. The takeover was by a new consortium, which included former riders Bob Dugard and Danny Dunton, Dave Lanning and the famous musician Acker Bilk. The team under performed badly, finishing 17th from 18 teams despite the new image and failed to make any impact in subsequent seasons.

In what was to be the final year for the Rebels in 1975, the team did win the Midland Cup against Wolverhampton Wolves under the captainship of Dag Lovaas. Following the threat of track closure the promoters started a new team at White City Stadium called the White City Rebels leaving Oxford with no team or riders.

A new Oxford team were formed after a committee of fans had created a "Save Our Stadium" campaign over the previous winter and entered the 1976 National League season (tier 2). The club dumped the unpopular name of Rebels and reverted back to the Cheetahs under new promoters Harry Bastable and Tony Allsop and the venue was known again as Oxford Stadium. In 1977, Oxford Stadium was purchased by David Hawkins' Northern Sports for £250,000, ending the concern about permanent closure. The team continued to compete in the second division and saw the number riders include the likes of Martin Yeates and George Hunter.

=== 1980s ===
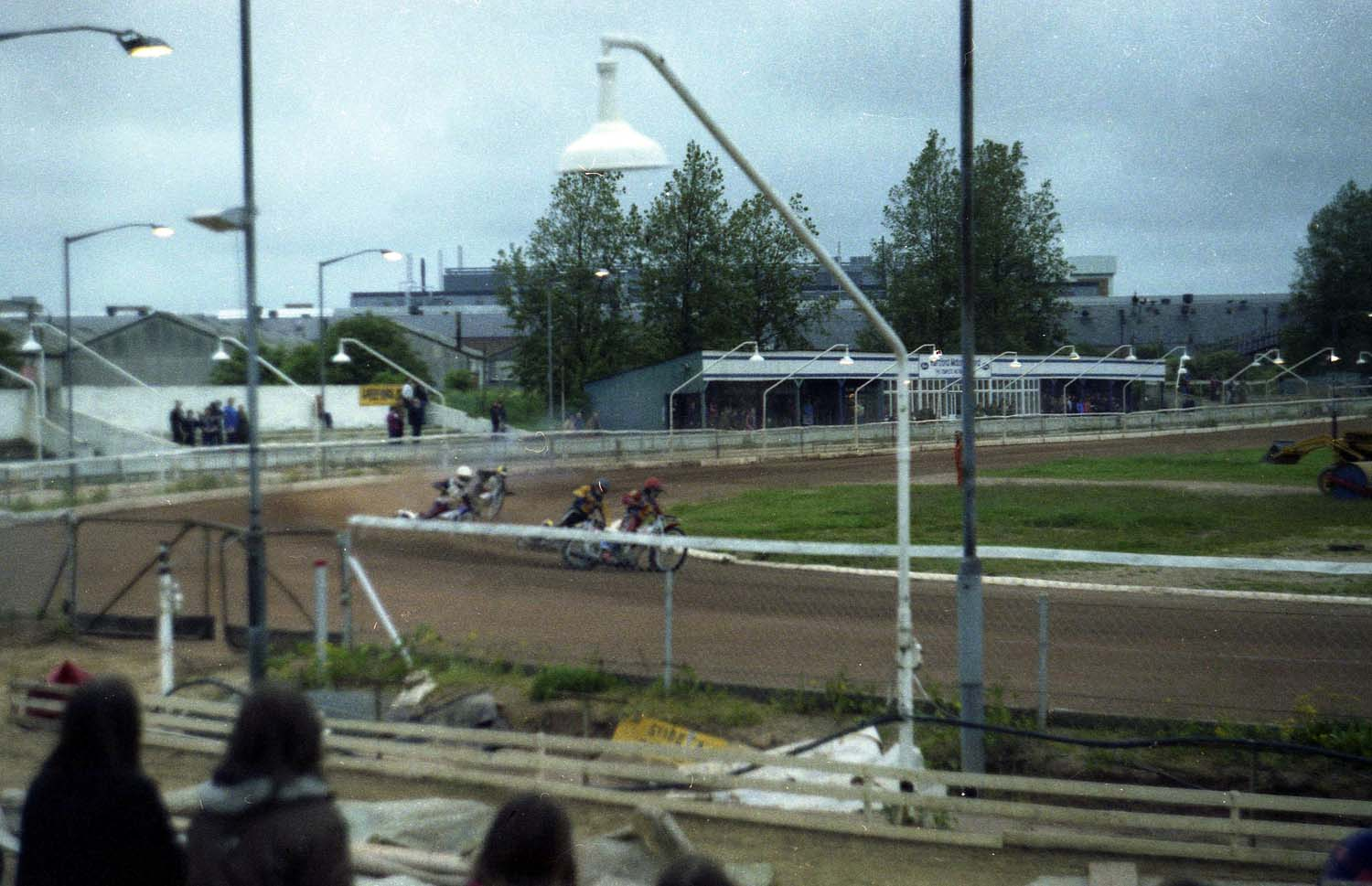
Speedway at Oxford in 1981

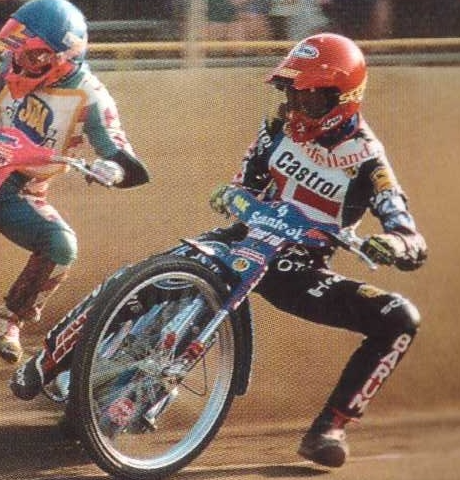
Hans Nielsen in Danish colours

Dave Perks topped the league averages in 1980 but the team failed to finish any higher than 12th from 1980 to 1983. Then in 1984, Oxford Cheetahs changed the face of British speedway. Northern Sports invested heavily into the stadium with a £1.5 million three tier grandstand restaurant and sports centre. David Hawkins installed Bernard Crapper and John Payne as speedway co-promoters and the team were entered for the 1984 British League season (the top league tier). The Cheetahs broke all transfer fee records by signing Danish international Hans Nielsen from Birmingham for a record £30,000, Simon Wigg from Cradley Heath for £25,000, Marvyn Cox for £15,000 from Rye House, Melvyn Taylor for £12,000 from King's Lynn and Dane Jens Rasmussen.

After a moderate 1984 campaign the team won four trophies in 1985. They won the league, Knockout Cup, Midland Cup and pairs. The Oxford City council gave the team a civic reception and parade through Oxford on an open top bus.

The following season, the team won a clean sweep of five trophies, winning the league, KO Cup, League Cup, Midland Cup and pairs. Hans Nielsen, was arguably the world's leading rider during the period, topping the league averages a remarkable seven consecutive seasons and being crowned world champion three times in 1986, 1987 and 1989. The Cheetahs won a third league championship in 1989, with Martin Dugard supporting Nielsen and Wigg in the averages.

=== 1990s ===
Northern Sports parent company Hawkins of Harrow began to run into financial trouble and the team suffered lack of investment, Hans Nielsen left and the team applied to and raced in division two in 1993. They won the division two fours championship in 1994. Northern Sports were later liquidated, meaning the team was not financed by the stadium owners. Additionally in 1995 and 1996 there was only one division of British speedway meaning the Oxford Cheetahs returned to the top division under independent promoters. In 1997, another league restructure resulted in a new Elite League, with the Premier League becoming division two, Oxford competed in the latter.

The team competed in the Elite League under new promotion from 1998 and signed Todd Wiltshire as their number 1.

=== 2000s ===
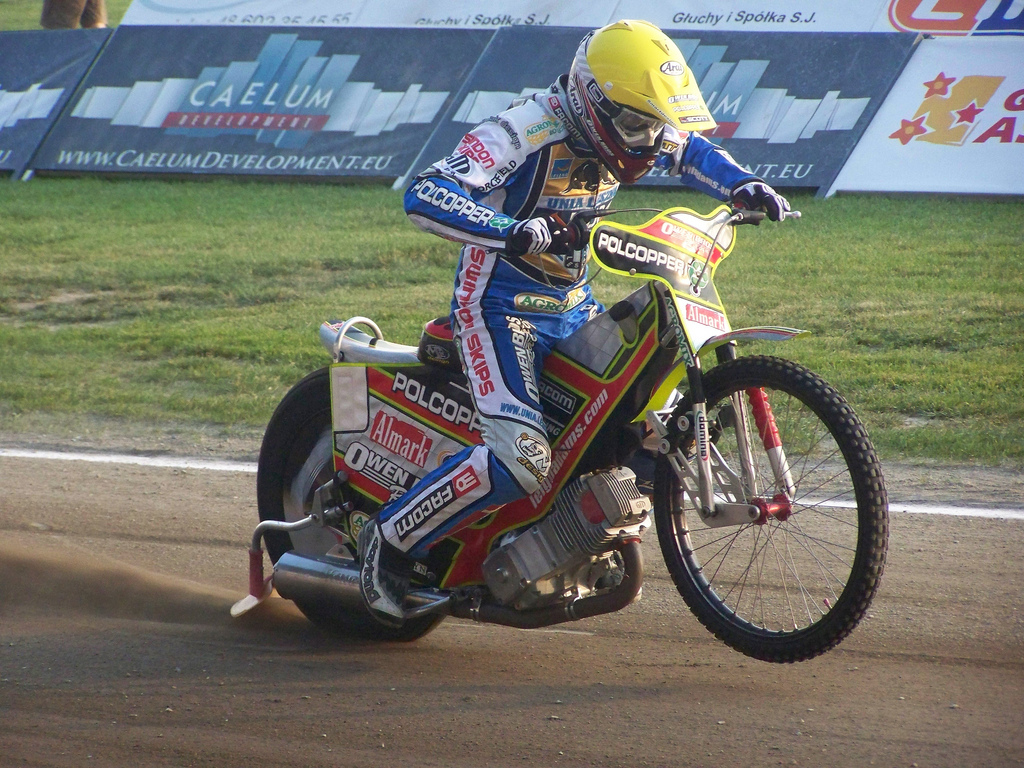
Leigh Adams

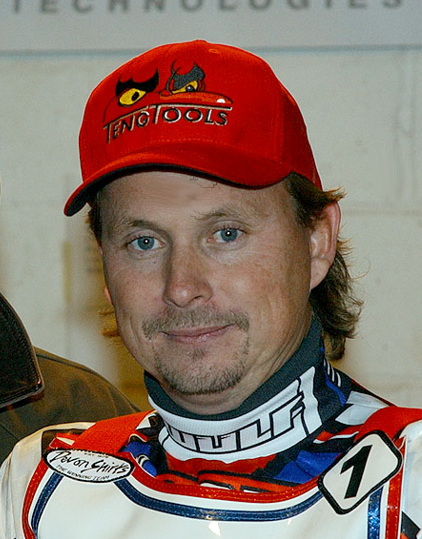
Todd Wiltshire

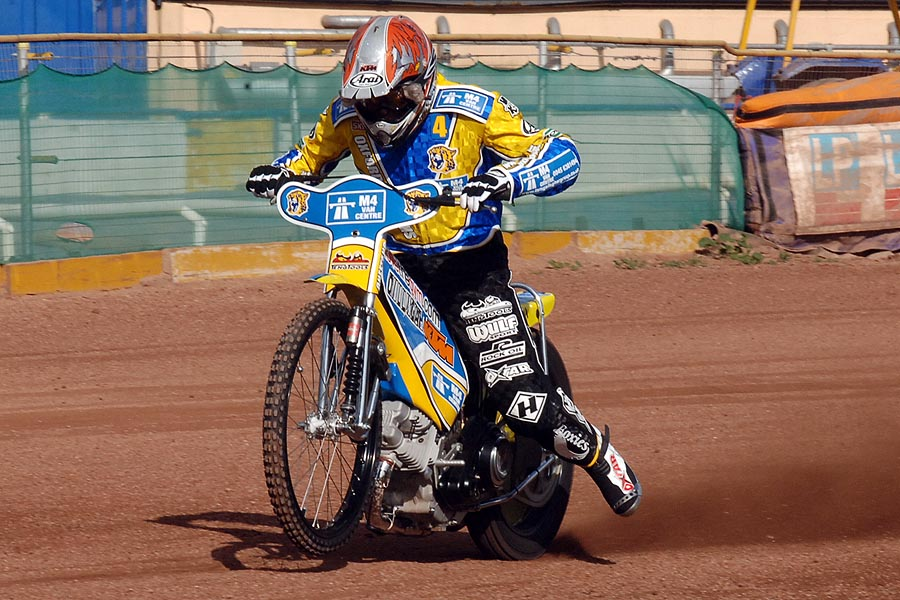
Steve Johnston

Promoter Steve Purchase signed Australian Leigh Adams for the 2001 season and supported by Wiltshire, Brian Andersen, Steve Johnston and the Dryml brothers Lukáš and Aleš, the Cheetahs became champions of Britain for the fifth time.

The Oxford Cheetahs were renamed for three seasons as the Oxford Silver Machine from 2003 to 2005, under the promotion of Nigel Wagstaff. Again the renaming was not popular with the fans but number 1 rider Greg Hancock was. However, in 2006 they reverted to their original name, which was apt because it would be their final full season as a top tier speedway team for 18 years.

Until 30 May 2007, the Cheetahs rode in the Elite League and operated a junior side known as the Oxford Lions which competed in the Conference League. In a statement issued by the British Speedway Promoters Association on 31 May 2007, their owner Colin Horton closed the club as a result of poor attendances and financial losses. In June 2007, businessman Allen Trump invested in the club (also sponsoring the club via LCD Publishing) to secure the lease on the track and the Cheetahs completed the 2007 season in the Conference League, replacing the Lions.

After the 2007 season, owner Allen Trump planned to bring the Cheetahs back into the Premier League for 2008. However, Trump was unable to secure a deal with landlords, the Greyhound Racing Association (GRA) to continue speedway racing at the Cowley and handed the promotion back to the BSPA. Further negotiations with the GRA were unsuccessful and Oxford had no speedway for 14 years. A number of committed fans keen to see the return of speedway to Oxford remained active. Two supporters groups, the Oxford Speedway Supporters Club (OSSC) and Save Oxford Speedway (SOS) held regular events and trips for Oxford fans and actively campaigned for the return of speedway to Oxford.

=== 2020s ===
On 11 November 2021, it was confirmed that the Cheetahs would return for the 2022 season in the SGB Championship, after a 14-year absence from British Speedway. The stadium had been leased to Kevin Boothby, who was keen to bring back the sport. Jamie Courtney would be the team promoter. The Cheetahs also ran a junior side called the Chargers for the 2022 NDL season and 2023 NDL season, winning the league title during the latter.

In 2024, Oxford named three teams to compete in all three tiers of British speedway (the first time that a club had a team in each of the three leagues). The Cheetahs remained in the Championship, the Spires into the Premiership, and the Chargers remained in the NDL. The Cheetahs reached the play-off and knockout cup finals.

== Previous teams (from 1949) ==
Extended content

season	Rider	Rider	Rider	Rider	Rider	Rider	Rider	Rider
1949	Alex Gray	Alf Elliott (capt)	Alf Viccary	Bert Croucher	Bill Downton	Bill Kemp	Bill Reynolds	Bob Aldridge
	Bob McFarlane	Cliff Ladbrooke	Dennis Gray	Ernie Rawlins	Ernie Steers	Frank Boyle	Fred Vivian	James Osborne
	Jim Boyd	Jimmy Coy	Jimmy Wright	Joe Peck	Johnny Fry	Maurice Hutchens	Peter Lloyd	Roy Court
1950	Bill Kemp	Bill Osborne	Bob McFarlane	Brian Wilson	Buster Brown	Colin Clark	Eric Irons	Ernie Rawlins
	Frank Boyle	Frank Johnson	Harry Saunders	Jimmy Wright	Pat Clark	Ron Carvill		
1951	Bill Kemp	Bill Osborne	Bob McFarlane	Brian Wilson	Colin Clark	Cyril Quick	Doug Ible	Eric Irons
	Ernie Rawlins	Frank Boyle	Harry Saunders	Herby King	Pat Clark	Roger Wise		
1952	Bill Kemp	Bill Osborne	Ernie Lessiter	Ernie Rawlins	Frank Boyle	Harry Saunders	Herby King	Jim Boyd
	Jim Gregory	Len Glover	Pat Clark	Ray Terry	Ron Wilson	Tony Wintour	Vic Taylor	
1953	Benny King	Bill Codling	Bill Osborne	Bill Kemp	Bob McFarlane	Frank Boyle	Frank Johnson	Herby King
	Jim Boyd	Jim Gregory	Jim Tolley	Peter Robinson	Ray Moore	Ron Wilson		
1954	Bill Osborne	Bill Thatcher	Bob Baker	Bob McFarlane	Bob Wells	Dennis Newton	Frank Johnson	Kid Curtis
	Jim Gregory	Jim Tebby	Nobby Stock	Peter Robinson	Ronnie Genz			
1955	Bill Thatcher	Bob Baker	Bob Wells	Dennis Newton	Kid Curtis	Maury Courtnell	Peter Robinson	Reg Trott
	Ronnie Genz	Terry Courtnell						
1956	Bill Thatcher	Bob Baker	Dennis Newton	Howdy Byford	Jim Tebby	Maury Courtnell	Pat Clark	Peter Robinson
	Ronnie Genz	Roy Bowers	Terry Courtnell	Tommy Miller				
1957	Danny Dunton	Dennis Newton	Frank Johnson	Gordon McGregor	Howdy Byford	Jack Biggs	Jimmy Squibb	Maury McDermott
	Ray Cresp	Ronnie Genz	Roy Bowers					
1958	Alan Lunn	Arthur Wright	Brian Miller	Charlie New	Colin Gooddy	Dave Still	Dennis Newton	Eric Boothroyd
	Frank Johnson	Gordon McGregor	Howdy Byford	Reg Duval	Ronnie Genz	Roy Bowers		
1959	Arne Pander	Arthur Wright	Cliff Cox	Colin Gooddy	Gordon McGregor	Howdy Byford	Ken Adams	Nick Nicholls
	Ronnie Genz	Roy Bowers						
1960	Arne Pander	Bob Dugard	Cliff Cox	Colin Gooddy	Danny Dunton	Dave Hankins	Dave Still	Eric Boothroyd
	Gordon McGregor	Gordon Owen	Howdy Byford	Jack Biggs	Jimmy Gleed	John Key	Ken Adams	Ray Liston
	Ronnie Genz	Roy Bowers	Ted Connor					
1961	Arne Pander	Bengt Brannefors	Danny Dunton	George Major	Gordon McGregor	Howdy Byford	Jack Biggs	Jim Tebby
	John Bishop	Reg Duval	Ronnie Genz	Roy Bowers				
1962	Alf Hagon	Colin Gooddy	Danny Dunton	Gordon McGregor	Jack Biggs	Jack Geran	John Belcher	John Bishop
	John Hook	Per Tage Svensson	Reg Duval	Ronnie Genz				
1963	Alf Hagon	Arne Pander	Chum Taylor	Colin Gooddy	Danny Dunton	George Major	Glyn Chandler	Jack Geran
	John Bishop	Ronnie Genz	Trevor Hedge					
1964	Arne Pander	Colin Gooddy	Colin McKee	Danny Dunton	Eddie Reeves	George Major	Jack Geran	Jimmy Gooch
	John Bishop	Ron How	Ronnie Genz					
1965	Arne Pander	Bill Finch	Danny Dunton	Eddie Reeves	Glyn Chandler	Jimmy Gooch	Jimmy Heard	John Belcher
	John Bishop	John Hensley	John Hook	John Leader	Ken Vale	Maury McDermott	Ron How	Stan Stevens
	Tyburn Gallows	Wayne Barry						
1966	Arne Pander	Des Lukehurst	Eddie Reeves	Jimmy Gooch	John Bishop	Maury McDermott	Pete Seaton	Tony Clarke
1967	Arne Pander	Colin Gooddy	Des Lukehurst	Eddie Reeves	Joe Weichlbauer	Ken Vale	Leo McAuliffe	Maury McDermott
	Pete Seaton	Rick Timmo	Roy Trigg	Ted Spittles	Tim Bungay			
1968	Arne Pander	Colin Gooddy	Eddie Reeves	Godtfred Andreasen	John Bishop	John Poyser	Leo McAuliffe	Mick Bell
	Pete Seaton	Rick Timmo	Ronnie Genz	Ted Spittles				
1969	Colin Gooddy	Conny Samuelsson	David Crane	Eddie Reeves	George Major	John Bishop	Ken Vale	Leo McAuliffe
	Mick Bell	Peter Jarman	Pete Saunders	Pete Seaton	Rick Timmo	Ronnie Genz		
1970	Andy Ross	Colin Gooddy	Eddie Reeves	George Major	Hasse Holmqvist	Mick Bell	Pat Johnson	Paul O'Neil
	Peter Jarman	Pete Saunders	Pete Seaton	Rick Timmo	Ronnie Genz			
1971	Arthur Price	Brian Clark	Col Cottrell	Colin Gooddy	John Davis	John Jackson	Ken McKinlay	Laurie Sims
	Norman Strachan	Øyvind S. Berg	Pete Saunders	Pete Seaton	Richard Greer	Rick Timmo	Ronnie Genz	Tommy Roper
1972	Bobby McNeil	Colin Gooddy	Garry Middleton	Gordon Kennett	John Davis	Julian Wigg	Ken McKinlay	Laurie Sims
	Malcolm Ballard	Norman Strachan	Øyvind S. Berg	Paul Gachet	Preben Rosenkilde	Rick Timmo	Roger Johns	Svein Kaasa
1973	Bob Kilby	Bobby McNeil	Eddie Reeves	Gordon Kennett	Hasse Holmqvist	John Davis	John Dews	Malcolm Ballard
	Rick Timmo	Roger Johns	Tony Lomas					
1974	Bob Kilby	Bobby McNeil	Brian Clark	Gordon Kennett	Henk Steman	John Davis	John Dews	Martin Yeates
	Paul Gachet	Peter Jarman	Richard Greer	Rick Timmo	Trevor Geer	Ulf Lövaas		
1975	Brian Clark	Dag Lovaas	Eddie Davidsson	Gordon Kennett	Hasse Holmqvist	Helgi Langli	John Dews	Paul Gachet
	Richard Greer	Richard Hellsen	Trevor Geer					
1976	Andy Bales	Brian Leonard	Carl Askew	Colin Meredith	Harry Maclean	Jim Wells	Kevin Young	Malcolm Corradine
	Mick Handley	Phil Bass	Pip Lamb	Roy Sizmore	Steve Holden			
1977	Brian Leonard	Colin Meredith	Gerald Smitherman	Greg Joynt	Kevin Poole	Kevin Young	Malcolm Holloway	Martin Yeates
	Mick Handley	Paul Share	Phil Bass	Pip Lamb	Richie Caulwell	Roy Sizmore		
1978	Brian Leonard	Carl Askew	Colin Meredith	Dave Shields	George Hunter	James Moore	John Hack	John Homer
	Les Sawyer	Mick Blaynee	Mick Handley	Pip Lamb	Richie Caulwell			
1979	Carl Askew	Colin Ackroyd	Colin Meredith	Dave McKenzie	Denzil Kent	George Hunter	Gary Ainslie	Greg Irving
	John Barker	John Grahame	John Hack	Keith Chapman	Ken Fearon	Les Rumsey	Michael Holding	Mick Handley
	Pip Lamb	Rob Dole						
1980	Alan Williams	Andy Passey	Billy Spiers	Bruce Cribb	Chris Sully	Colin Ackroyd	Dave Perks	Derek Harrison
	John Grahame	John Hack	Kevin Bowen	Mick Fletcher	Mick Handley	Paul Evitts	Ray Caruana	Steve Crockett
	Trevor Geer							
1981	Alan MacLean	Andy Passey	Arnold Haley	Arthur Price	Ashley Pullen	Colin Ackroyd	Dave Perks	Derek Harrison
	John Grahame	Mick Fletcher	Mick Handley	Paul Evitts				
1982	Andy Passey	Ashley Pullen	Bill Barrett	Brian Woodward	Colin Ackroyd	Gary Chessell	George Wells	Graham Drury
	John Frankland	Keith Booth	Kevin Lock	Kevin Smart	Martin Satchell	Mick Fletcher	Mick Handley	Pete Erskine
	Scott Cook	Simon Cross	Wayne Jackson					
1983	Gary Chessell	Graham Drury	Ian Clark	Keith Booth	Kevin Smart	Mark Chessell	Mark Minett	Mark Summerfield
	Mike Wilding	Nigel De'ath	Nigel Sparshott	Steve Crockett	Wayne Jackson			
1984	Andrew Silver	Dave Perks	David Tyler	Hans Nielsen	Ian Clark	Jens Rasmussen	Jim McMillan	Kevin Smart
	Klaus Lausch	Mark Chessell	Martin Yeates	Marvyn Cox	Melvyn Taylor	Nigel De'ath	Nigel Sparshott	Simon Wigg
1985	Alastair Stevens	Andy Grahame	Hans Nielsen	Jens Rasmussen	Jon Surman	Klaus Lausch	Marvyn Cox	
	Melvyn Taylor	Nigel De'ath	Nigel Sparshott	Simon Wigg	Troy Butler			
1986	Alastair Stevens	Andy Grahame	Hans Nielsen	Jeremy Luckhurst	Jon Surman	Kevin Smart	Marvyn Cox	Nigel De'ath
	Per Sorensen	Simon Wigg						
1987	Alastair Stevens	Andy Grahame	Hans Nielsen	Jens Rasmussen	Jon Surman	Kevin Smart	Mark Carlson	Marvyn Cox
	Neil McCarthy	Nigel De'ath	Nigel Greenhalgh	Nigel Sparshott	Peter Lloyd	Troy Butler	Wayne Ross	
1988	Alastair Stevens	Einar Kyllingstad	Glenn Doyle	Hans Nielsen	Jon Surman	Lars Munkedal	Martin Dugard	Marvyn Cox
	Nigel De'ath	Paul Muchene	Peter Lloyd	Simon Wigg	Spencer Timmo			
1989	Andy Grahame	Colin White	Hans Nielsen	Kevin Pitts	Martin Dugard	Marvyn Cox	Paul Dugard	Paul Muchene
	Simon Wigg	Troy Butler						
1990	Alastair Stevens	Dean Barker	Hans Nielsen	John Bostin	Jon Surman	Kevin Pitts	Kieran McCullagh	Martin Dugard
	Paul Dugard	Sean McCullagh	Simon Wigg	Troy Butler	Wayne Parker			
1991	Craig Boyce	Darren Grayling	Dean Barker	Glenn Cunningham	Hans Nielsen	Kieran McCullagh	Jon Surman	Lance Sealey
	Mark Carlson	Martin Dugard	Peter Schroeck	Spencer Timmo	Tony Primmer			
1992	Daz Sumner	Dean Barker	Glenn Cunningham	Hans Nielsen	Mark Carlson	Martin Dugard	Morten Andersen	Spencer Timmo
	Troy Butler							
1993	Alan Grahame	Andy Hackett	Andy Meredith	Carl Blackbird	Chris Cobby	Darren Andrews	David Clarke	David Smart
	Gary Sweet	Mark Blackbird	Paul Blackbird	Peter Glanz	Rene Madsen	Spencer Timmo	Tony Langdon	Wayne Parker
1994	Alan Grahame	Andy Meredith	Darren Andrews	Daz Sumner	David Smart	Martin Goodwin	Mick Poole	Nikals Karlsson
	Rene Madsen	Spencer Timmo	Stefan Ekberg	Stephen Morris				
1995	Armando Castagna	Daniel Andersson	David Steen	Jimmy Nilsen	Martin Goodwin	Michael Coles	Rene Madsen	Steve Bishop
1996	Bohumil Brhel	Carl Checketts	Lawrence Hare	Mark Frost	Mark Lemon	Martin Goodwin	Martin Willis	Marvyn Cox
	Philippe Bergé	Tomáš Topinka						
1997	Anthony Barlow	Darren Andrews	Gavin Hedge	Jason Bunyan	Jeremy Luckhurst	Krister Marsh	Lawrence Hare	Mikael Teurnberg
	Neville Tatum	Philippe Bergé	Simon Wolstenholme					
1998	Jan Stæchmann	Jason Crump	Lawrence Hare	Paul Hurry	Steve Johnston	Steve Schofield	Todd Wiltshire	
1999	Alun Rossiter	Craig Boyce	Jan Stæchmann	Lawrence Hare	Paul Hurry	Steve Johnston	Todd Wiltshire	
2000	Aleš Dryml Jr.	Andrew Appleton	Brian Andersen	Jan Stæchmann	Jimmy Nilsen	Jon Underwood	Lukáš Dryml	Mark Lemon
	Roman Povazhny	Steve Johnston	Todd Wiltshire					
2001	Aleš Dryml Jr.	Andrew Appleton	Brian Andersen	Davey Watt	Leigh Adams	Lukáš Dryml	Steve Johnston	Todd Wiltshire
2002	Aleš Dryml Jr.	Alun Rossiter	Andrew Appleton	Brian Andersen	Davey Watt	Jamie Smith	Joachim Kugelmann	Leigh Adams
	Lukáš Dryml	Mark Lemon	Steve Johnston					
2003	Andy Smith	Charlie Gjedde	Craig Boyce	Greg Hancock	Jan Stæchmann	Luboš Tomíček Jr.	Jernej Kolenko	Kai Laukkanen
	Matej Ferjan	Nicki Pedersen	Niels K. Iversen	Niklas Klingberg	Sebastian Ułamek	Todd Wiltshire	Travis McGowan	
2004	Brent Werner	Craig Boyce	Emil Kramer	Greg Hancock	Jonas Davidsson	Niels K. Iversen	Rafal Dobrucki	Ryan Fisher
	Sebastian Ułamek	Tom P. Madsen	Travis McGowan					
2005	Stefan Andersson	Tomasz Bajerski	Craig Branney	Lukáš Dryml	Freddie Eriksson	Renat Gafurov	Henrik Gustafsson	Billy Hamill
	Greg Hancock	Niels Kristian Iversen	Jesper B Jensen	Tobias Kroner	Tom P. Madsen	Travis McGowan	Chris Mills	Kjasts Puodžuks
	Paweł Staszek	Luboš Tomíček Jr.						
2006	Eric Andersson	Stanisław Burza	Aleš Dryml Jr.	Freddie Eriksson	David Howe	Tomasz Piszcz	Adam Pietraszko	Tony Rickardsson
	Adam Skórnicki	Luboš Tomíček Jr.	Davey Watt	Todd Wiltshire				
2007+	Eric Andersson	Aleš Dryml Jr.	Freddie Eriksson	Jesper B Jensen	Steve Johnston	Tom P. Madsen	Henrik Møller	Piotr Protasiewicz
	Chris Schramm	Andy Smith	Luboš Tomíček Jr.					
2007	Andrew Bargh	Mattie Bates	Danny Betson	Dan Blake	Jordan Frampton	Brendan Johnson	George Piper	Lee Smethills
	Sam Martin	Scott Campos						
2022 SGB Champ	Troy Batchelor	Cameron Heeps	Josh MacDonald	Kyle Newman	Scott Nicholls	Dillon Ruml	Paul Starke	Aaron Summers
	Jack Thomas							
2022 NDL	Henry Atkins	Arran Butcher	Jacob Clouting	Sam Hagon	Ben Hopwood	Jordan Jenkins	Luke Killeen	Jody Scott
	Nathan Stoneman	Sam Woods						
2023 SGB Champ	Henry Atkins	Ashton Boughen	Cameron Heeps	Jordan Jenkins	Lewis Kerr	Luke Killeen	Ryan Kinsley	Sam Masters
	Scott Nicholls							
2023 NDL	Henry Atkins	Jacob Clouting	Kelsey Dugard	Jacob Fellows	Jason Garrad	Jordan Jenkins	Luke Killeen	Ryan Kinsley
	Jody Scott							
2024 SGB Prem	Ashton Boughen	Chris Harris	Maciej Janowski	Drew Kemp	Lewis Kerr	Nicolai Klindt	Erik Riss	Rohan Tungate
	Charles Wright							
2024 SGB Champ	Henry Atkins	Ashton Boughen	Cameron Heeps	Jordan Jenkins	Luke Killeen	Sam Masters	Scott Nicholls	
2024 NDL	Jacob Clouting	Jason Garrad	Luke Killeen	Jody Scott	Alex Spooner	Senna Summers	Ashton Vale	
2025 SGB Prem	Craig Cook	Francis Gusts	Maciej Janowski	Peter Kildemand	Luke Killeen	Victor Palovaara	Erik Riss	Rohan Tungate
	Charles Wright							
2025 SGB Champ	Dan Gilkes	Francis Gusts	Cameron Heeps	Jordan Jenkins	Luke Killeen	Jonas Knudsen	Sam Masters	Mitchell McDiarmid
2025 NDL	Max Broadhurst	Arran Butcher	Jacob Clouting	Darryl Ritchings	Jody Scott	Senna Summers	Ashton Vale	
2026 SGB Champ	Luke Killeen	Sam Masters	Mitchell McDiarmid	Erik Riss	Darryl Ritchings	Anders Rowe	Dayle Wood	
2026 NDL	Max Broadhurst	Harry Fletcher	Darryl Ritchings	Jody Scott	Senna Summers	Ashton Vale	Mason Watson	

+ Elite League side withdrew from league

== Season summary ==
Extended content

First team

Year and league	League position	Notes
1949	13th	
1950	1st	champions
1951	12th	
1952	12th	
1953	6th	
1954	7th	
1955	4th	
1956	7th	
1957	9th	
1958	8th	
1959	7th	
1960	3rd	
1961	9th	
1962	7th	
1963	7th	
1964	1st	champions
1965	4th	
1966	15th	
1967	14th	
1968	15th	
1969	15th	
1970	13th	
1971	17th	
1972	17th	Rebels
1973	11th	Rebels
1974	17th	Rebels
1975	7th	Rebels
1976	14th	
1977	13th	
1978	7th	
1979	3rd	
1980	15th	
1981	12th	
1982	19th	
1983	14th	
1984	8th	
1985	1st	champions, KO Cup, Midland Cup, pairs
1986	1st	champions, KO Cup, League Cup, Midland Cup, pairs
1987	11th	pairs
1988	4th	
1989	1st	champions
1990	4th	
1991	9th	
1992	10th	
1993	11th	
1994	8th	fours
1995	17th	
1996	13th	
1997	11th	
1998	7th	
1999	8th	
2000	8th	
2001	1st	champions
2002	6th	
2003	4th	Silver Machine
2004	5th	Silver Machine
2005	9th	Silver Machine
2006	10th	
2007	N/A	withdrew
2022	9th	
2023	2nd	play-offs
2024	5th	Spires
2024	2nd	Cheetahs, PO final
2025	6th	Spires
2025	6th	Cheetahs
2026	8th	Cheetahs, Pairs Winners

Season summary (juniors)

Year and league	League position	Notes
1997	9th	Cubs
2003	3rd	Silver Machine Academy
2004	3rd	Silver Machine Academy
2005	1st	Silver Machine Academy, (Champions)
2007	2nd	Lions (then Cheetahs when 1st team folded)
2022	4th	Chargers, play-offs
2023	2nd	Chargers, (Champions)
2024	3rd	Chargers
2025	1st	Chargers, (Champions)

== Notable riders ==
- (Denmark) Brian Andersen
- (England) Pat Clark
- (England) Marvyn Cox
- (Australia) Todd Wiltshire
- (Czech Republic) Aleš Dryml Jr.
- (England) Martin Dugard
- (England) Ronnie Genz
- (England) Colin Gooddy
- (England) Andy Grahame
- (United States) Greg Hancock
- (England) Ron How
- (Scotland) George Hunter
- (Australia) Steve Johnston
- (England) Gordon Kennett
- (England) Scott Nicholls
- (Denmark) Hans Nielsen
- (Denmark) Arne Pander
- (England) Dave Perks
- (Denmark) Jens Rasmussen
- (England) Nigel Sparshott
- (England) Melvyn Taylor
- (New Zealand) Rick Timmo
- (England) Simon Wigg
- (Australia) Todd Wiltshire
- (England) Martin Yeates

== See also ==
- List of United Kingdom Speedway League Champions
- Knockout Cup (speedway)
