= Jimmy Gooch (speedway rider) =

English international speedway rider

- Born: 16 November 1928; Dagenham, East London, England
- Died: 18 June 2011 (aged 82); Chelmsford, Essex
- Nationality: British (English)

Career history
- 1950–1955, 1956: Wembley Lions
- 1955: Swindon Robins
- 1956: Bradford Dukes
- 1957–1958: Ipswich Witches
- 1960–1961: New Cross Rangers
- 1962–1963: Norwich Stars
- 1964–1966: Oxford Cheetahs
- 1967–1968: Newport Wasps
- 1969–1970: Hackney Hawks

Individual honours
- 1965: Speedway World Championship finalist

Team honours
- 1951, 1952, 1953, 1964: National League Champion
- 1954, 1963, 1964: National Trophy Winner
- 1950, 1951, 1954: London Cup
- 1964: Britannia Shield

James Everard Gooch (16 November 1928 – 18 June 2011) was an international motorcycle speedway rider from England. He was capped by England and Great Britain.

== Speedway career ==
Gooch reached the final of the Speedway World Championship in the 1965 Individual Speedway World Championship. In 1966, he was runner up in the Australian Championship.

Gooch rode in the top tier of British Speedway from 1950 to 1970, riding for various clubs. Successes included winning the league championship four times and the London Cup three times with Wembley Lions.

Gooch was capped by the England national speedway team ten times and Great Britain three times.

== World final appearances ==
=== Individual World Championship ===
- 1965 – (England) London, Wembley Stadium – 14th – 3pts

=== World Team Cup ===
- 1965 – (West Germany) Kempten (with Barry Briggs / Charlie Monk / Ken McKinlay / Nigel Boocock) – 3rd – 18pts (3)
