= Lawrence Hare =

English speedway rider (born 1969)

- Born: 23 December 1969 (age 56); Elmsett, Suffolk, England
- Nationality: British (English)

Career history
- 1991, 1993, 1995, 2000: Ipswich Witches
- 1993–1995: Edinburgh Monarchs
- 1993: Rye House Rockets
- 1996–1999: Oxford Cheetahs
- 2001, 2002: Exeter Falcons

Individual honours
- 1998: British Championship finalist

Team honours
- 1996: Premier League Four-Team Championship

Lawrence Charlton Hare (born 23 December 1969) is a former international speedway rider from England.

== Speedway career ==
Edinburgh Monarchs signed Hare from Ipswich Witches in 1994.

In 1996, Hare was part of the Oxford Cheetahs four that won the Premier League Four-Team Championship, which was held on 4 August 1996, at the East of England Arena.

Hare reached the final of the British Speedway Championship in 1998. He rode in the top tier of British Speedway from 1991 to 2002, riding for various clubs.

During a match in 2002, Hare was riding for the Exeter Falcons when he crashed which resulted in paralysis from a back injury.
