= Reg Trott =

British motorcycle speedway rider (1930 – 2015)

- Born: 2 January 1930; Mitcham, Surrey, England
- Died: 19 September 2015 (aged 85)
- Nationality: British (English)

Career history
- 1949–1955: Wimbledon Dons
- 1955: Oxford Cheetahs
- 1956–1964: Norwich Stars
- 1965–1967: West Ham Hammers
- 1969–1972: Eastbourne Eagles

Team honours
- 1954, 1955, 1965: League champion
- 1950, 1951, 1953, 1963, 1965: National Trophy/KO Cup
- 1965, 1966: London Cup
- 1971: League champion (tier 2)

Herbert Reginald Trott (2 January 1930 – 19 September 2015) was an international motorcycle speedway rider from England. He earned one international cap for the England national speedway team.

== Biography ==
Trott, born in Mitcham, began his British leagues career riding for Wimbledon Dons during the 1949 Speedway National League. Although in his novice season, he rode some significant meetings recording a 2.87 average. He went on to ride for seven seasons at Wimbledon, in which time he won three National Trophies (1950, 1951 and 1953) and two league titles (1954 and 1955).

In 1956, Trott signed for Norwich Stars and would stay with the club for nine years until the end of the 1964 season. During his time at Norwich, he won another National Trophy in 1963.

When the British League was inaugurated in 1965, Trott joined West Ham and contributed to a league, Knockout Cup and London Cup treble winning season.

After missing the 1967 and 1968 seasons, Trott returned to speedway riding for Eastbourne Eagles for the 1969 British League Division Two season and averaged a solid 8.73. He remained at Eastbourne for four years and won the league title with them in 1971. He retired after the 1972 season and later became a speedway referee.
