= Harry Maclean (speedway rider) =

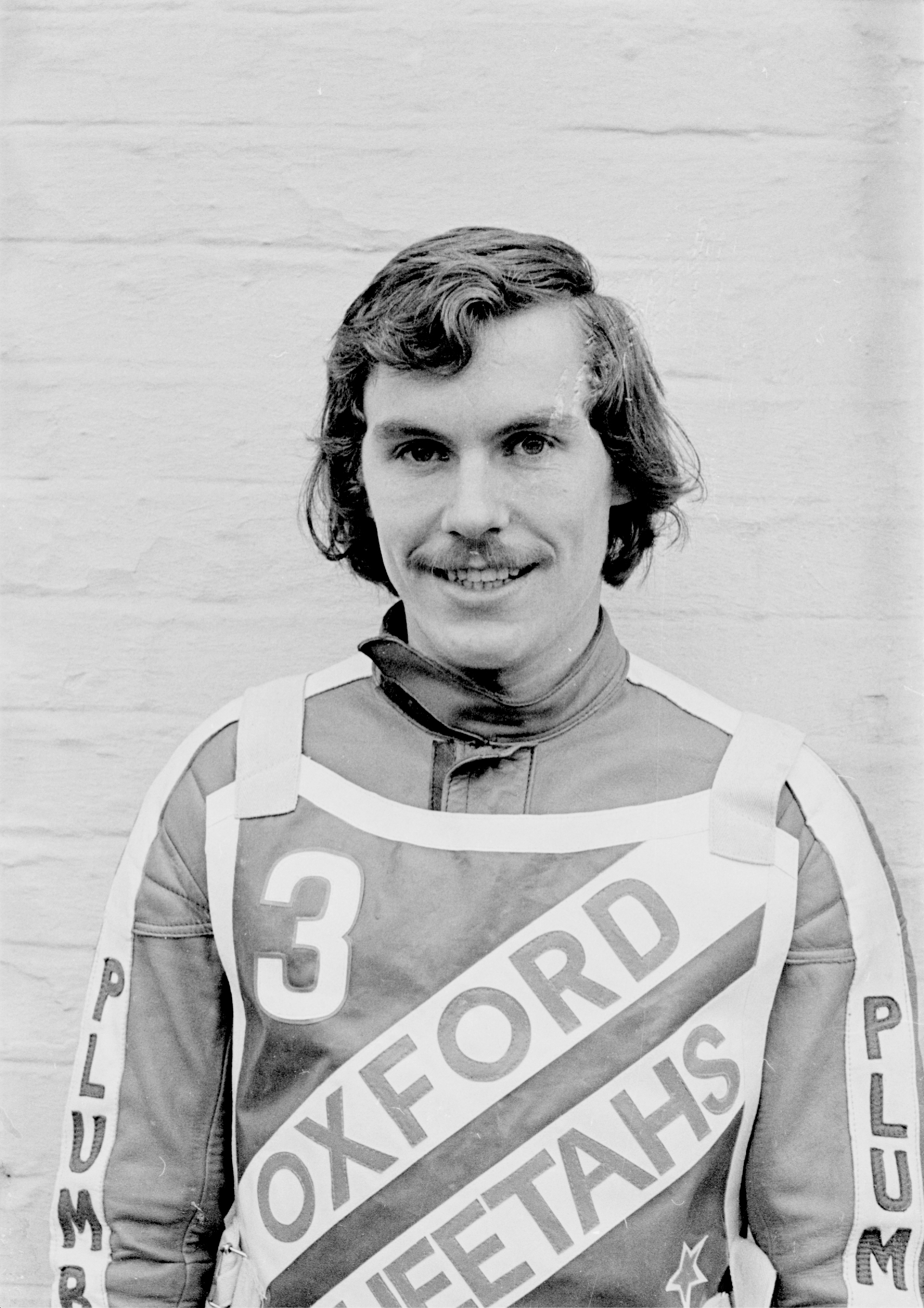
- Born: 12 December 1951 (age 74); Edinburgh, Scotland
- Nationality: British (Scottish)

Career history
- 1974: Coventry Bees
- 1974: Long Eaton Archers
- 1975: Stoke Potters
- 1975 & 1977: Coatbridge Tigers
- 1976: Oxford Cheetahs
- 1977: Teesside Tigers
- 1978–1979: Milton Keynes Knights
- 1980–1981: Edinburgh Monarchs
- 1981–1983: Glasgow Tigers

Harry Maclean (born 12 December 1951 in Edinburgh, Scotland) is a former motorcycle speedway rider, who represented Scotland five times and rode in the National League.

== Speedway career ==
Maclean started his British league speedway career with an appearance for Barrow Happy Faces during the 1972 British League Division Two season. In 1974 he was living in Coventry and rode for the Coventry Bees in division 1 and the Long Eaton Archers in division 2. At the end of 1974, he was contracted to Long Eaton Speedway and when that closed during the winter that year, the promoters joined up with the promoter at Stoke Potters. This resulted in a glut of riders and Harry was loaned to Coatbridge and Teesside.

At the end of 1975, Harry Bastable and Tony Allsopp, promoters at Stoke, moved the licence to Oxford for 1976, filling the void left by the move of Oxford Rebels to White City Stadium. 1976 saw Maclean missing a lot of matches through injury and not getting rides, so he asked to be transferred, being taken in by Teesside Tigers for the 1977 season. When that season finished, Ron Wilson, Teesside's promoter, took Maclean to Milton Keynes, a new track.

The end of 1979 saw a swap deal agreed, with Maclean going to Edinburgh Monarchs and Bert Harkins going to Milton Keynes Knights.

Maclean retired from speedway in 1983.

== Golf career ==
Maclean took up golf at age of 37, which culminated in representing Scotland three times in the 'hickory clubs' internationals (the latest in 2022).

== Personal life ==
Maclean lives in Gullane, his home for twenty eight years. He is married to Brenda and they have two children, a girl and boy. Since retirement from speedway, he has worked as an accountant (never qualified, but had been doing accounts, even while riding), helping other riders in particular with their tax returns.

Upon returning to Scotland, Maclean worked in an Accountant's office for a couple of years then invested in an engineering company. When that business was sold, went into the window cleaning business.

Maclean is a qualified scuba diver to the level of PADI Advanced, diving all over the world.

His brother Alan Maclean also rode speedway. Alan MacLean Born:08.12.1956, Edinburgh, Scotland Alan rode with British Clubs: Milton Keynes (1978) Edinburgh (1979) Stoke (1979, 1980) Oxford (1981) Workington (1981)
