= George Major (speedway rider) =

British former motorcycle speedway rider (born 1939)

- Born: 26 October 1939 (age 87); Donnington, Oxfordshire, England
- Nationality: British (English)

Career history
- 1959: Aldershot Shots
- 1960: Yarmouth Bloaters
- 1961: Newcastle Diamonds
- 1962: Neath Welsh Dragons
- 1963: St. Austell Gulls
- 1961, 1963–1964, 1969–1970, 1972: Oxford Cheetahs/Rebels
- 1964: Norwich Stars
- 1964–1965, 1973: Cradley Heathens/United
- 1966–1967, 1971: Sheffield Tigers
- 1968: Leicester Lions
- 1970: Doncaster Dragons
- 1970: Newport Wasps
- 1971–1975: Birmingham Brummies

Team honours
- 1974: British League Division Two Champion
- 1974: British League Division Two KO Cup Winner
- 1975: New National League Champion

Clive George Major (born 26 October 1939) is a former motorcycle speedway rider from England.

== Biography ==
Born in Donnington, Oxfordshire, Major's first speedway experience was riding on a track built on a rubbish tip in his home town. He made his competitive debut in 1959 for Aldershot Shots in the Southern Area League. In the early 1960s, he rode for Yarmouth Bloaters, Newcastle Diamonds, Neath Welsh Dragons, St Austell Gulls, and Norwich Stars before riding for his home town club, Oxford Cheetahs in 1963 and 1964. In 1964, he signed for Cradley Heathens, and was the team's top scorer in 1964 before riding with them in the first season of the British League the following year, in which he averaged over 7.5 points per match.

After two seasons with Sheffield Tigers, Major signed for Leicester Lions in 1968, before returning to Oxford in the 1969 season after injury saw him lose his place in the Lions team. In 1970, no longer a high points scorer at the top level, he dropped down to the second division with Doncaster Stallions, averaging over 9.5 over the season, with four maximum points scores. Four seasons with Birmingham Brummies followed, in which he captained the team and continued to score highly in the second division, before retiring at the end of the 1975 season.

Major represented Britain in 1963 and 1964 in Test matches against an Overseas team, and England in 1964 against Scotland. He competed in the first British Final in 1965, finishing thirteenth. He competed in the Second Division Riders Final in 1971 and 1972, finishing seventh and ninth respectively.
