= Ronnie Genz =

British motorcycle speedway rider

- Born: 17 March 1930; Forest Gate, East London, England
- Died: 28 August 2016 (aged 86); Ilford, Essex
- Nationality: British (English)

Career history
- 1950-1953: New Cross Rangers
- 1951: Wolverhampton Wasps
- 1953: Yarmouth Bloaters
- 1954-1964, 1968, 1970-1971: Oxford Cheetahs
- 1965-1967: Poole Pirates
- 1971-1972: Newport Wasps

Individual honours
- 1961, 1962, 1965: British Championship finalist

Team honours
- 1964: National League winner
- 1964: National Trophy winner
- 1964: Britannia Shield Winner

Ronald Joseph Genz (17 March 1930 – 28 August 2016) was an international motorcycle speedway rider from England. He earned seven international caps for the England national speedway team and one cap for the Great Britain team.

== Speedway career ==
Genz rode in the top tier of British Speedway from 1950-1972, riding for various clubs but primarily for Oxford Cheetahs. He started his career for New Cross Rangers in 1950, after being demobbed from the army as dispatch rider.

Genz reached the final of the British Speedway Championship in 1961, 1962 and 1965.

Genz suffered a fractured skull in a race crash late in the 1968 season.
