= Danny Dunton =

British speedway rider

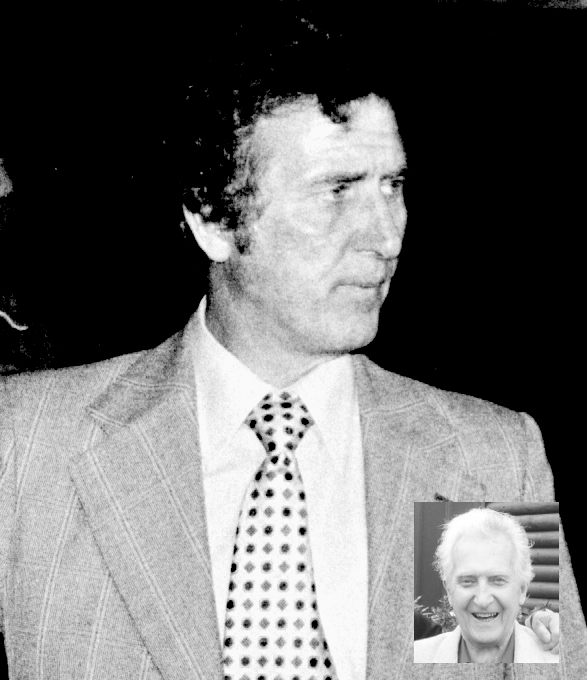
- Born: 13 May 1924; Cholesbury, Buckinghamshire, England
- Died: 2 January 2015 (aged 90); England
- Nationality: British (English)

Career history
- 1949–1952, 1954: Harringay Racers
- 1953, 1955: Birmingham Brummies
- 1953: Yarmouth Bloaters
- 1955: Weymouth Scorchers
- 1955: Bristol Bulldogs
- 1955–1958: Ipswich Witches
- 1959, 1964: Belle Vue Aces
- 1960–1965: Oxford Cheetahs
- 1963: Long Eaton Archers
- 1964: Swindon Robins

Team honours
- 1952: National Trophy Winner
- 1952: London Cup

Dennis Clifford Dunton (13 May 1924 – 2 January 2015) was an English international motorcycle speedway rider and promoter who reached the final of the Speedway World Championship in 1950, achieving 12th place with 5 points. As well as riding, Dunton promoted Peterborough Panthers and co-promoted Oxford Cheetahs, then Oxford Rebels and finally White City Rebels.

== Biography ==
Dunton was born in Cholesbury, Buckinghamshire. He first took his bike in 1949 to Harringay Racers, and immediately found himself as a team member in his first meeting, a rare if not unique feat.

As well as Harringay Racers, Belle Vue Aces, Ipswich Witches, Oxford Cheetahs, and Long Eaton Archers are listed as tracks where Dunton rode as a contracted or loaned rider. In 1950, in only his second season, he qualified for the World Championship Final and finished 12th – the top three riders were Jack Young, Graham Warren and Cyril Brine.

In 1953, following a crash at New Cross, he used a wheelchair and could not walk for 4 months. Danny Dunton was named Chairman of the Speedway Riders' Association in April 1963. Dunton retired from racing at Long Eaton at the end of 1963, having scored 127 and a half points from just 17 matches.

In 1964, Dunton was the Team Manager at Oxford, taking over the promotion the following year. He was joined in 1972 by Bob Dugard, becoming co-promoter. He already had opened up Peterborough Speedway at the Showground in 1970, and was joined as co-promoter by his son, Lee, in 1979, who was also the Team Manager. 1974 saw the Rebels at the bottom of the League Table but, with new signing Dag Lovaas the team improved, winning the Midland Cup. After a threatened closure of the stadium at Oxford, Danny and Bob Dugard secured White City as a venue, only to find out too late, the stadium was saved. At White City, the Rebels won the Gulf British League in 1977 but, the venue not proving viable, raced their last season in 1978 and the licence was moved to Eastbourne.

Following the decision of the British League promoters in November 1967 to run a second division, five promoters from the British League, Dunton, Maury Littlechild, Len Silver, Ron Wilson and Reg Fearman formed Allied Presentations Limited. This company opened three tracks in 1968, Reading, Middlesbrough, and Rayleigh, and constructed Crewe in 1969, followed by Peterborough in 1970. Each track was promoted by one of the APL members and Danny Dunton’s track was Peterborough.

After he retired from riding, Dunton served during the 1970s on the committee of the British League and then the National League as its chairman in 1981–85 and 1987, and was honoured by being made president in 1988. Danny was active in the World Speedway Riders Association and was the honoured and respected president for the year 2005/06.

After retirement, Dunton was a keen golfer and restorer of vintage speedway bikes, which he used to race in specialist matches. That had to stop after a motoring accident (car ran into him) in 2004 and he had to have a leg amputated.

Dunton lived for many years with his wife in Ley Hill, Buckinghamshire. He died after a long illness on 2 January 2015.

== World Final appearances ==
- 1950 – (England) London, Wembley Stadium – 12th place – 5 points
