= List of defunct motorcycle speedway teams in the United Kingdom =

This is a list of British motorcycle speedway teams that no longer operate.

Team name	Leagues	Base	Year started	Year ended	Notable riders
Aldershot Shots	National League Division Three	Aldershot Stadium	1950	1960	
Ashfield Giants		Saracen Park, Glasgow	1949	1952	Ken Le Breton
Arena-Essex Hammers		Arena Essex Raceway	1984 (renamed the Lakeside Hammers in 2007)	2018	
Barrow Bombers	British League Division Two	Holker Street	1972	1974	
Birmingham Brummies	SGB Championship, SGB Premiership	Perry Barr Stadium	1928	2025	Listed in article
Bradford Dukes	Elite League	Odsal Stadium	1945	1997	Listed in article
Bristol Bulldogs	National League, Provincial League	Knowle Stadium, Bristol	pre-1939	1954	Phil Crump
Canterbury Crusaders	National League, British League Division Two	Kingsmead Stadium, Canterbury	1968	1987	Listed in article
Carmarthen Dragons		Carmarthen Showground, Carmarthen	2002	2004	Trevor Harding, Ben Wilson, Ben Powell
Cradley Heath Heathens	British League	Dudley Wood Stadium	1947	1996	Listed in article
Crayford Kestrels	British League Division Two/National League	Crayford & Bexleyheath Stadium, Crayford	1968	1983	
Crewe Kings	British League Division Two	Crewe Stadium, Crewe	1969	1975	Listed in article
Crystal Palace Glaziers	Southern League, National League, Speedway National League Division Two	Crystal Palace Exhibition Grounds, London	1929	1939	Listed in article
Ellesmere Port Gunners	British League Division Two/National League	Ellesmere Port Stadium, Ellesmere Port	1972	1982, 1985 (one season)	
Exeter Falcons	Elite League, Premier League	County Ground Stadium, Exeter	1929	2005	Listed in article
Fleetwood Flyers	Speedway National League Division Two	Highbury Avenue Sports Stadium, Fleetwood	1948	1952	
Hackney Wick Wolves	Speedway National League,	Hackney Wick Stadium	1935	1939	Listed in article
Hackney Hawks	British League,	Hackney Wick Stadium	1963	1983	Listed in article
Hackney Kestrels	Speedway National League	Hackney Wick Stadium	1984	1990	Listed in article
Halifax Dukes	Speedway National League, Speedway Provincial League	The Shay, Halifax	1949	1985	Eric Boocock
Harringay Racers	Speedway National League, division 1	Harringay Stadium	1947	1954	Listed in article
Hastings Saxons	Speedway National League Division Three	Pilot Field, Hastings	1948	1949	
Hull Vikings	Elite League, Premier League	Craven Park	1995	2005	Listed in article
Leicester Stadium	Speedway Northern League, Speedway Southern League	The Stadium, Blackbird Road, Leicester	1929	1931	Cyril "Squib" Burton, Syd Jackson
Leicester Super	Speedway Northern League	Leicester Super Speedway, Melton Road, Leicester	1930	1931	Fred Wilkinson
Leicester Hounds	Speedway National League Division Two	The Stadium, Blackbird Road Leicester	1937	1937	Wilf Plant, Lloyd Goffe
Leicester Hunters	Speedway National League Division Three, Speedway Provincial League	The Stadium, Blackbird Road, Leicester	1949	1962	Ken McKinlay
Liverpool Chads	Speedway National League Division Three, Speedway National League Division Two, Speedway Provincial League	Stanley Stadium, Liverpool	late 1920s	1960	Peter Craven
London Lions	Speedway British League	Hackney Wick Stadium	1986	1986	See Listed in article
Long Eaton Invaders	Premier League	Long Eaton Stadium	1950	1997	Carl Stonehewer
Middlesbrough Bears	Northern League, Speedway National League	Cleveland Park	1939	1996	Listed in article
Milton Keynes Knights		Milton Keynes Greyhound Stadium, Milton Keynes	1978	1992	
Motherwell Eagles		The Stadium, Milton Street, Motherwell	1951	1954	Listed in article
New Cross Rangers	Speedway National League, Speedway Provincial League	New Cross Stadium	1937	1963	Tom Farndon
Newport Wasps	Provincial League, British League, National League, Premier League	Hayley Stadium	1964 (closed 1977, reopened 1997)	2011	
Norwich Stars	Northern League, Speedway National League Division Two, Speedway National League, Division one	The Firs Stadium, Norwich	1930	1964	
Nottingham	Southern League, National League	Olympic Gardens/White City Stadium, Nottingham	1930	1938	
Paisley Lions	Speedway National League	Love Street	1975	1976	Sid and Mick Sheldrick, Alan Bridgett, Mike Fullerton, Colin Caffrey, and Stuart Mountford
Rayleigh Rockets	Speedway Provincial League, Metropolitan League	Rayleigh Weir Stadium, Rayleigh, Essex	1949	1973	
Rochdale Hornets		Athletic Grounds, Greater Manchester	1970	1972	Peter Collins
Romford Bombers		Brooklands Stadium, Romford	1969	1971	
Somerset Rebels	Conference League, Premier League, SGB Premiership, SGB Championship	Oaktree Arena, Highbridge, Somerset	2000	2019	
Southampton Saints	Speedway National League	Banister Court Stadium, Southampton	1928	1963	
Stamford Bridge Pensioners	Southern League, Speedway National League	Stamford Bridge Stadium, London	1929	1932	Gus Kuhn, Wal Phillips
Sunderland Stars	British League Division Two	Sunderland Greyhound Stadium, East Boldon	1964	1974	Russ Dent, George Barclay, Graeme Smith, Jack Millen, Vic Harding.
Swindon Robins	SGB Championship	Abbey Stadium	1949	2019	Listed in article
Trelawny Pitbulls	Conference League	Clay Country Moto Parc, St Austell	2003	2003	
Trelawny Tigers	Premier League	Clay Country Moto Parc, St Austell	2001	2003	Chris Harris
Walthamstow Wolves	Speedway National League	Walthamstow Stadium	1934	1951	Listed in article
Wembley Lions	Southern League, Speedway National League	Empire Stadium	1929	1971	Listed in article
West Ham Hammers	Speedway British League, Speedway National League	West Ham Stadium	1930	1971	Listed in article
White City Rebels	Speedway British League	White City Stadium (London)	1976	1978	Gordon Kennett, Steve Weatherley, Trevor Geer, Marek Cieślak and Kai Niemi
Wimbledon Dons	Southern League, National League, Speedway British League, Conference League	Wimbledon Stadium	1929	2005	Listed in article
Wolverhampton Wolves	SGB Premiership	Monmore Green Stadium	1928	2023	Listed in article
Yarmouth Bloaters	Speedway National League, Speedway Provincial League, Conference League	Yarmouth Stadium, Caister-on-Sea	1948	1962	
