= 1950 Speedway National League Division Three =

British motorcycle speedway season

- League: National League Division Three
- Season: 1950
- No. of competitors: 10
- Champions: Oxford Cheetahs
- National Trophy (Div 3 final): Oxford Cheetahs
- Riders' Championship: Pat Clark
- Highest average: Ken Middleditch
- Division/s above: Division One; Division Two

The 1950 National League Division Three was the fourth season of British speedway's National League Division Three

The league was reduced from 13 teams to 10. Halifax Dukes, Plymouth, Yarmouth and Hanley had all moved up to Division Two whilst Hastings Saxons dropped out. The two new sides were Aldershot Shots and St Austell Gulls whilst Tamworth changed their nickname from 'Hounds' to 'Tammies'.

Oxford Cheetahs, who had finished bottom of the table during their inaugural league season in 1949, rose spectacularly up the league to win the title. The Oxford team was made up from an entirely new set of riders including Harry Saunders, signed as captain from Tamworth for £750, Pat Clark from Rayleigh for £250, Bill Osborne from Walthamstow, Raymond Buster Brown from Wembley and Eric Irons from Cradley.

Ken Middleditch of Poole topped the averages.

== Final table ==
Pos	Team	PL	W	D	L	Pts
1	Oxford Cheetahs	36	26	2	8	54
2	Poole Pirates	36	23	3	10	49
3	Leicester Hunters	36	21	0	15	42
4	Swindon Robins	36	19	1	16	39
5	Aldershot Shots	36	18	1	17	37
6	Tamworth Tammies	36	17	0	19	34
7	Exeter Falcons	36	16	1	19	33
8	Liverpool Chads	36	14	1	21	29
9	Rayleigh Rockets	36	12	0	24	24
10	St Austell Gulls	36	9	1	26	19

== Fixtures & results ==
=== A fixtures ===
Home \ Away	ALD	EX	LEI	LIV	OX	PP	RAY	SA	SWI	TAM
Aldershot		55–29	38–42	55–28	53–30	52–32	57–27	47–37	42–42	54–30
Exeter	51–33		41–42	58–25	35–49	45–39	63–21	60–24	46–38	55–29
Leicester	63–21	48–35		65–19	35–48	45–39	60–24	56–28	39–45	45–39
Liverpool	39–42	47–35	39–45		35–49	42–42	56–28	42–41	51–32	40–44
Oxford	56–27	49–35	61–23	66–18		42–42	60–24	64–20	43–41	51–33
Poole	47–37	43–41	45–39	37–47	43–41		61–23	50–33	51–33	53–31
Rayleigh	37–47	50–34	49–34	49–35	33–51	32–51		46–38	41–42	38–46
St Austell	35–48	52–31	34–50	52–32	37–47	30–53	60–24		39–44	40–44
Swindon	49–35	54–30	50–34	61–23	30–54	62–21	53–31	48–34		42–41
Tamworth	49–35	51–32	29–55	54–30	36–36	38–45	43–40	53–31	47–37	

Legend: Blue = home team win; Yellow = draw; Red = away team win.

=== B fixtures ===
Home \ Away	ALD	EX	LEI	LIV	OX	PP	RAY	SA	SWI	TAM
Aldershot		53–31	46.5–37.5	56–27	50–33	31–52	41–43	52–32	50–34	59–25
Exeter	61–23		52–31	66–18	48–36	42–42	55–29	52–32	36–48	65–19
Leicester	51–33	59–25		41–42	64–17	39–45	56–28	53–31	58–26	36–48
Liverpool	52–32	43–40	44–39		40–44	36–48	55–29	60–24	43–41	39–45
Oxford	52–31	61–23	39–45	59–25		42.5–41.5	52–32	52–32	45–39	57–26
Poole	46–38	56–28	44–40	52–32	45–39		58–26	56–28	54–30	43–41
Rayleigh	40–44	41–43	51–33	43–39	41–43	54–30		46–38	50–34	45–39
St Austell	47–37	50–34	30–54	32–52	42–42	45–39	64–20		68–16	55–28
Swindon	50–34	53–30	50–34	37–47	44–37	45–39	33–51	52–31		46–38
Tamworth	45–38	38–46	37–47	43–41	29–54	43–41	51–32	50–34	50–33	

Legend: Blue = home team win; Yellow = draw; Red = away team win.

== Leading Averages ==
	Rider	Team	C.M.A.
1	Ken Middleditch	Poole	10.53
2	Basil Harris	Aldershot	9.90
3	Pat Clark	Oxford	9.78
4	Trevor Redmond	Aldershot	9.64
5	Don Hardy	Exeter	9.57

== National Trophy Stage Three ==
- For Stage Two - see Stage Two
- For Stage Three - see Stage Three

The 1950 National Trophy was the 13th edition of the Knockout Cup. The Trophy consisted of three stages; stage one was for the third division clubs, stage two was for the second division clubs and stage three was for the top-tier clubs. The winner of stage one would qualify for stage two and the winner of stage two would qualify for the third and final stage. Oxford won stage one and therefore qualified for stage two.

Third Division Qualifying First round

Date	Team one	Score	Team two
10/04	Liverpool	50-57	Oxford
06/04	Oxford	76-32	Liverpool

Third Division Qualifying Second round

Date	Team one	Score	Team two
22/04	Swindon	60-47	Oxford
20/04	Oxford	62-46	Swindon
10/04	Exeter	65-41	Leicester
07/04	Leicester	66-42	Exeter
19/04	Tamworth	71-37	St Austell
18/04	St Austell	48-58	Tamworth
20/04	Poole	51-57	Aldershot
19/04	Aldershot	61-45	Poole
21/04 replay	Leicester	53-55	Exeter
17/04 replay	Exeter	62-45	Leicester

Third Division Qualifying semifinals

Date	Team one	Score	Team two
05/05	Exeter	54-53	Oxford
27/04	Oxford	83-24	Exeter
03/05	Tamworth	67-41	Aldershot
01/05	Aldershot	63-44	Tamworth

=== Qualifying final ===
First leg

17 May 1950

Tamworth Tammies Brian Wilson 11 Eric Boothroyd 10 Dick Tolley 6 Lionel Watling 4 Brian Shepherd 3 Laurie Schofield 2 Ivor Davies 2 John Hitchings 0	38 – 70	Oxford Cheetahs Pat Clark 14 Ernie Rawlins 13 Frank Boyle 13 Eric Irons 11 Bob McFarlane 11 Bill Kemp 5 Buster Brown 3 Jim Wright R/R

Tamworth Greyhound Stadium

Second leg

18 May 1950

Oxford Cheetahs Pat Clark 14 Frank Boyle 13 Bob McFarlane 10 Ernie Rawlins 9 Eric Irons 8 Bill Kemp 7 Buster Brown 6 Jim Wright R/R	67 – 41	Tamworth Tammies Eric Boothroyd 8 Brian Shepherd 7 Brian Wilson 7 Lionel Watling 7 Dick Tolley 6 Ivor Davies 4 Laurie Schofield 2 John Hitchings 0

Oxford Stadium

== Riders' Championship ==
Pat Clark won the National League Division Three Rider's Championship, in front of 28,000 spectators. The final was held at Walthamstow Stadium on 23 October.

Pos.	Rider	Pts
1	(England) Pat Clark	15
2	(New Zealand) Trevor Redmond	13
3	(England) Ken Middleditch	11
4	(England) Gerry Jackson	9
5	(England) Norman Street	9
?	(England) Harwood Pike	6
?	(England) Alex Gray	6
?	(Australia) Hugh Geddes	3
?	(England) Jack Unstead	?
?	(England) Basil Harris	?
?	(England) Reg Duval	?
?	(England) Cyril Quick	?
?	(England) Harold Jackson	?

== Riders & final averages ==
Aldershot

- Basil Harris 9.77
- Trevor Redmond 9.72
- Doug Ible 7.27
- Ivor Powell 6.69
- Bob Harrison 5.75
- Joe Rodwell 5.65
- Doug Papworth 5.17
- Pat Flanagan 4.14
- Bob Bunney 4.00
- Ron Burnett 3.52
- Ken Smith 3.36
- Bill Grimes 3.09

Exeter

- Don Hardy 9.69
- Hugh Geddes 8.20
- Arthur Pilgrim 7.56
- Ken Walsh 6.87
- Ted Moore 6.20
- Vic Gent 6.56
- Jack Bedkober 5.93
- Johnny Sargeant 5.19
- Johnny Myson 3.57
- Goog Hoskin 5.67

Leicester

- Lionel Benson 8.77
- Jock Grierson 8.39
- Harwood Pike 8.32
- Cyril Page 7.52
- Les Beaumont 7.45
- Johnny Carpenter 7.09
- Joe Bowkiss 6.86
- Vic Pitcher 6.78
- Ron Wilson 6.63
- Sid Hipperson 6.21
- Ernest Palmer 5.33
- Jack Watts 3.47

Liverpool

- Bill Griffiths 7.27
- Harry Welch 7.00
- Reg Duval 6.92
- Doug Serrurier 6.73
- Angus McGuire 6.13
- Arthur Bush 6.03
- Percy Brine 5.94
- Derek Glover 5.90
- Alf Webster 5.67
- Stan Bedford 3.64
- Buddy Fuller 3.62
- Brian Craven 1.54

Oxford

- Pat Clark 9.99
- Frank Boyle 9.12
- Bob McFarlane 8.35
- Bil Kemp 7.32
- Eric Irons 7.22
- Bill Osborne 7.20
- Jimmy Wright 7.16
- Harry Saunders 7.10
- Buster Brown 6.40
- Ernie Rawlins 6.07
- Brian Wilson 5.10

Poole

- Ken Middleditch 10.53
- Cyril Quick 9.44
- Ticker James 7.42
- Tony Lewis 7.30
- Dick Howard 6.46
- Terry Small 6.28
- Charlie Hayden 6.09
- Frank Wheeler 5.00
- Alan Kidd 4.75
- Allan Wall 4.00

Rayleigh

- Les McGillivray 7.06
- Gerry Jackson 7.03
- Jack Unstead 7.01
- Ron Howes 6.87
- Vic Gooden 5.29
- Frank Bettis 5.19
- Charlie Mugford 4.15
- Tom O'Connor 4.06
- James Osborne 3.96
- Mike Wood 2.88

St Austell

- Harold Bull 7.68
- Ray Ellis 7.48
- Norman Street 7.30
- Ken James 5.89
- Maury McDermott 5.62
- John Yates 5.53
- Bill Sobey 5.33
- Rusty Wainwright 4.74
- Larry Young 4.50
- Ed Williams 4.00
- George Gower 2.91

Swindon

- Mick Mitchell 8.21
- Hugh Geddes 8.44
- Alex Gray 8.18
- Bill Downton 6.88
- Bob Jones 6.74
- Frank Evans 6.34
- Ron Clark 6.28
- George Craig 6.26
- Reg Lambourne 6.09
- Danny Malone 5.98
- Tom Wilson 2.20

Tamworth

- Brian Wilson 8.78
- Lionel Watling 8.14
- Eric Boothroyd 8.00
- Dick Tolley 7.43
- Ivor Davies 7.21
- Brian Shepherd 5.84
- Harry Bastable 5.39
- Cecil Hookham 5.21
- Laurie Schofield 4.40
- Ray Beaumont 3.21
- James Hitchings 2.95
- Geoff Newman 0.24

== See also ==
- List of United Kingdom Speedway League Champions
- Knockout Cup (speedway)
