= 1948 Speedway National League Division Three =

British motorcycle speedway season

- League: National League Division Three
- Season: 1948
- No. of competitors: 12
- Champions: Exeter Falcons
- National Trophy (Div 3 final): Southampton Saints
- Highest average: Alf Bottoms
- Division/s above: Division One; Division Two

The 1948 National League Division Three was the second season of British speedway's National League Division Three

The league had expanded from 8 teams to 12. Reigning champions Eastbourne Eagles were forced to close due to a petrol ban at their stadium, so their team moved a few miles along the Sussex coast to Hastings. The new entrants Coventry Bees, Hull Angels, Poole Pirates and Yarmouth Bloaters all struggled to make an impact and finished in the bottom five positions.

The Hull Angels were a corporation backed team, managed by Fred Archer and the team wore the crest of the city's coat-of-arms (3 golden crowns on a blue shield and yellow background).

Exeter Falcons won their first title and Alf Bottoms of Southampton topped the averages.

Eric Dunn of Hastings Saxons was a third speedway rider (with Reg Craven and Bill Wilson) to be killed during the season. 34-year-old Dunn was riding in a meeting (on 13 June) at the Arlington track when he fell and was hit by a rider behind. He died two days later in hospital (15 June).

== Final League table ==
Pos	Team	PL	W	D	L	Pts
1	Exeter Falcons	44	32	1	11	65
2	Cradley Heath Cubs	44	29	2	13	60
3	Southampton Saints	44	29	0	15	58
4	Tamworth Hounds	44	23	4	17	50
5	Hanley Potters	44	24	1	19	49
6	Hastings Saxons	44	22	0	22	44
7	Plymouth Devils	44	21	2	22	43
8	Coventry Bees	44	19	1	24	39
9	Hull Angels	44	19	0	25	38
10	Poole Pirates	44	17	0	27	34
11	Yarmouth Bloaters	44	13	1	30	27
12	Wombwell Colliers	44	10	1	33	21

== Fixtures & results ==
=== A fixtures ===
Home \ Away	COV	CH	EX	HAN	HAS	HUL	PLY	PP	SOT	TAM	WOM	YAR
Coventry		33–49	26–56	42–42	43–41	55–29	37–45	43–40	29–55	37–47	49–35	45–38
Cradley Heath	58–26		50–33	54–29	57–27	54–30	54–30	39–45	45–39	48–36	60–24	63–21
Exeter	57–27	65–18		66–18	57–27	60–23	58–25	65–19	48–36	65–19	69–15	57–27
Hanley	55–28	52–32	51–33		36–48	59–25	44–40	53–31	45–39	45–39	53–50	53–30
Hastings	60–24	57–27	40–44	44–39		43–40	55–29	51–33	31–53	56–28	59–25	58–26
Hull	44–39	36–48	63–21	37–47	45–39		58–26	58–24	45–39	43–38	47–31	52–28
Plymouth	58–24	43–40	32–51	46–38	49–34	59–24		48–36	38–45	42–42	57–27	48–33
Poole	60–24	39–45	46–38	45–36	40–44	65–19	37–46		51–33	36–48	57–27	60–23
Southampton	55–28	58–25	57–27	57–27	57–27	59–25	50–34	56–27		55–29	64–19	63–21
Tamworth	58–24	42–42	46–38	59–25	48–36	47–37	60–24	63–21	38–46		60–24	59–25
Wombwell	59–24	32–52	37–47	28–56	41–43	53–31	46–36	56–28	38–46	42–42		51–33
Yarmouth	60–23	40–43	35–45	45–38	46–38	48–35	51–33	56–27	32–52	34–50	55–29	

Legend: Blue = home team win; Yellow = draw; Red = away team win.

=== B fixtures ===
Home \ Away	COV	CH	EX	HAN	HAS	HUL	PLY	PP	SOT	TAM	WOM	YAR
Coventry		46–38	47–35	53–31	65–18	48–36	48–36	51–32	52–32	48–36	53–30	54–29
Cradley Heath	64–20		55–29	54–30	62–22	53–31	44–40	47–37	53–31	41.5–41.5	66–18	60–26
Exeter	48–36	67–16		53–30	58–26	62–22	41–43	53–30	46–38	57–27	61–23	60–24
Hanley	53–31	41–42	39–45		68–16	62–21	50–34	49–35	53–30	61–22	63–21	53–31
Hastings	48–3	56–28	41–43	39–44		45–37	44–40	51–33	31–53	45–38	52–31	55–29
Hull	56–28	54–30	50–34	38–44	64–20		58–36	47–36	47–37	53–30	58–26	51–33
Plymouth	54–30	58–26	38–46	48–35	57–26	51–33		57–27	45–39	63–21	65–19	57–27
Poole	37–47	59–25	31–52	51–31	49–35	59–24	55.5–28.5		49–35	50–34	58–26	46–38
Southampton	61–23	57–26	38–43	49–35	61–23	56–28	48–36	58–26		46.5–36.5	60–24	62–21
Tamworth	49.5–34.5	30–52	50–33	60–24	60–23	53–30	48–36	62–22	49–35		54–30	57–27
Wombwell	37–47	37–47	41–43	46–38	41–42	44–40	52–31	43–40	36–47	23–60		50–34
Yarmouth	37–46	37–47	41–41	34–50	57–27	50–33	51–30	45–39	41–43	46–38	43.5–37.5	

Legend: Blue = home team win; Yellow = draw; Red = away team win.

== Leading Averages ==
	Rider	Team	C.M.A.
1	Alf Bottoms	Southampton	11.29
2	Wally Green	Hastings	11.23
3	Cyril Roger	Exeter	9.93
4	Jock Grierson	Hastings	9.77
5	Bert Roger	Exeter	9.72

== National Trophy ==
The 1948 Trophy was the 11th edition of the Knockout Cup. The Qualifying event for Division 3 teams saw Southampton Saints win the final and qualify for the Elimination event. The Elimination event for Division 2 teams saw Birmingham Brummies win the final and qualify for the Quarter Finals proper.

Qualifying Event First Round

Date	Team One	Score	Team Two
08/04	Plymouth	56-50	Cradley Heath
17/04	Cradley Heath	66-42	Plymouth
13/04	Southampton	89-19	Wombwell
23/04	Wombwell	31-77	Southampton
07/04	Tamworth	82-26	Exeter
12/04	Exeter	81-27	Tamworth

Qualifying Second Round

Date	Team One	Score	Team Two
29/04	Stoke Hanley	64-43	Coventry
01/05	Coventry	48-59	Stoke Hanley
04/05	Southampton	77-31	Tamworth
05/05	Tamworth	46-62	Southampton
26/04	Poole	74-32	Yarmouth
27/04	Yarmouth	47-67	Poole
01/05	Hull	42-66	Cradley Heath
07/05	Cradley Heath	78-29	Hull

Qualifying Third Round

Date	Team One	Score	Team Two
10/05	Poole	49-57	Stoke Hanley
13/05	Stoke Hanley	64-44	Poole
11/05	Southampton	85-23	Cradley Heath
21/05	Cradley Heath	54-50	Southampton

=== Qualifying Final Round ===
First leg

25 May 1948

Southampton Saints Alf Bottoms 18 Bob Oakley 15 Jimmy Squibb 10 Alf Kaines 9 Bert Croucher 8.5 George Bason 8 Tom Oakley 2 Cecil Bailey 2	74.5 – 33.5	Hanley Potters Gil Blake 11 Les Jenkins 6 Ray Harris 5 Dave Anderson 4 Vic Pitcher 3.5 Dick Howard 2 Ken Adams 2 Frank Evans 0

Banister Court Stadium

Second leg

27 May 1948

Hanley Potters Gil Blake 14 Ray Harris 9 Les Jenkins 6 Dick Howard 5 Dave Anderson 4 Vic Pitcher 3 Frank Evans 3 Ken Adams 1	43 – 64	Southampton Saints Alf Bottoms 17 Bob Oakley 14 Jimmy Squibb 9 Bert Croucher 8 Alf Kaines 7 Cecil Bailey 6 George Bason 3 Tom Oakley 0

Sun Street Stadium

== Riders & final averages ==
Coventry

- Vic Emms 7.92
- Lionel Levy 7.43
- Bob Fletcher 7.28
- Bert Lacey 6.19
- Ed Pye 6.18
- George Smith 6.13
- Ralph Horne 5.65
- Bernard Tennant 5.36
- John Yates 4.65
- Fred Yates 4.62
- Derrick Tailby 2.71

Cradley Heath

- Gil Craven 9.52
- Les Beaumont 8.82
- Eric Irons 8.81
- Alan Hunt 8.16
- Jimmy Wright 7.78
- Bill Kemp 7.52
- Ken Sharples 6.98
- Bill Clifton 5.64
- Phil Malpass 5.49
- Ray Beaumont 4.41
- Ray Moreton 4.32
- Jimmy Coy 4.22

Exeter

- Cyril Roger 10.00
- Bert Roger 9.98
- Norman Clay 8.73
- Arthur Pilgrim 8.26
- Don Hardy 8.19
- Stan Hodson 7.35
- Bronco Slade 7.19
- Hugh Geddes 6.49
- Johnny Myson 5.24
- Stan Lanfear 3.89

Hanley

- Gil Blake 8.92
- Les Jenkins 8.32
- Dave Anderson 7.95
- Ray Harris 7.17
- Ken Adams 7.05
- Dick Howard 5.61
- Stan Bradbury 5.71
- Vic Pitcher 5.62
- Lindsay Mitchell 5.52
- Frank Evans 5.14
- Jack Dawson 5.00
- Jock Gordon 4.00

Hastings

- Wally Green 11.23
- Jock Grierson 9.75
- Bill Osborne 8.97
- Frank Bettis 6.51
- Ken Middleditch 6.00
- Ken Tidbury 5.12
- Ron Clark 5.01
- Dan English 4.52
- John Hayles 4.29
- Peter Mold 4.13
- Ken Smith 4.05
- Eric Dunn 4.00
- Bill Weston 2.29

Hull

- Mick Mitchell 8.94
- Dick Shepherd 7.35
- George Craig 7.19
- Al Allison 6.67
- Johnny White 6.34
- Bob Baker 6.08
- Derek Glover 5.33
- Norman Johnson 4.89
- Alf Webster 3.25
- Brian Gorman 3.17

Plymouth

- Pete Lansdale 9.06
- Len Read 8.77
- Peter Robinson 8.59
- Alex Gray 6.86
- Ted Gibson 5.78
- Bonny Waddell 5.27
- Charlie Challis 5.14
- Ivan Kessell 5.10
- Billy Newell 4.63
- Vic Gent 4.38
- Wally Matthews 4.37

Poole

- Joe Bowkiss 8.53
- Allan Chambers 7.66
- Alf Elliott 7.31
- Sid Clarke 6.78
- Fred Pawson 6.13
- Charlie Hayden 5.90
- Ginger Nicholls 5.20
- George Butler 4.69
- Frank Holcombe 4.18
- Sid Hazzard 3.76

Southampton

- Alf Bottoms 11.25
- Jimmy Squibb 9.52
- Cecil Bailey 8.58
- Bob Oakley 8.05
- Bert Croucher 7.01
- Tom Oakley 6.41
- Alf Kaines 5.87
- George Bason 4.56
- Bill Griffiths 4.00

Tamworth

- Arthur Payne 8.67
- Cyril Page 8.45
- Harry Saunders 8.44
- Basil Harris 8.08
- Bill Dalton 7.53
- Bill Harris 7.05
- Steve Langton 6.79
- Jack Baxter 6.67
- Peter Orpwood 6.07
- Charlie Oates 5.57
- Cecil Hookham 5.00
- Lionel Watling 3.87
- Howard Chipman 2.67

Wombwell

- Stan Hodson 8.15
- Harry Welch 7.38
- Jack Baxter 6.98
- Harry Saunders 6.76
- Harwood Pike 6.60
- Stan Beardsall 6.46
- Son Mitchell 5.26
- Len Tupling 4.80
- Red Hamley 4.69
- Charlie Oates 4.45
- Ken Allick 4.38
- Jeff Bishop 4.07
- Ernest Palmer 3.09
- Gerry Williams 2.46
- Bert Thomas 2.08
- Harry Modral 1.52

Yarmouth

- Reg Morgan 7.40
- Billy Bales 6.99
- Sid Hipperson 6.93
- Paddy Hammond 6.60
- Fred Rogers 5.64
- Bert Rawlinson 5.14
- Arthur Bush 5.10
- Roy Duke 5.05
- Bill Carruthers 4.81
- Ted Rawlinson 4.50
- Phil Day 2.67
- Bill Codling 2.55

== See also ==
- List of United Kingdom Speedway League Champions
- Knockout Cup (speedway)
