= 1949 Speedway National League Division Three =

British motorcycle speedway season

- League: National League Division Three
- Season: 1949
- No. of competitors: 13
- Champions: Hanley Potters
- National Trophy (Div 3 final): Hanley Potters
- Highest average: Billy Bales
- Division/s above: Division One; Division Two

The 1949 National League Division Three was the third season of British speedway's National League Division Three.

The league expanded to 13 teams from 12. Cradley Heath, Southampton and Coventry had all moved up to Division Two whilst Wombwell dropped out. The five new sides were Liverpool Chads, Leicester Hunters, Rayleigh Rockets, Oxford Cheetahs and Halifax Dukes. The latter racing on a new speedway track at The Shay.

Swindon Robins joined the league late in the season, when Reg Witcomb applied to the Speedway Control Board to take over the remaining fixtures of Hull Angels, who had withdrawn from the league.

Hanley Potters won the title on race points difference from Yarmouth Bloaters and Billy Bales of Yarmouth topped the averages.

== Final table ==
Pos	Team	PL	W	D	L	Pts
1	Hanley Potters	48	35	1	12	71
2	Yarmouth Bloaters	48	35	1	12	71
3	Tamworth Hounds	48	33	0	15	66
4	Halifax Dukes	48	28	2	18	58
5	Plymouth Devils	48	28	2	18	58
6	Poole Pirates	48	27	0	21	54
7	Exeter Falcons	48	24	0	24	48
8	Hastings Saxons	48	21	1	36	43
9	Liverpool Chads	48	19	0	29	38
10	Leicester Hunters	48	17	1	30	35
11	Swindon Robins+	48	15	1	32	31
12	Rayleigh Rockets	48	14	0	34	28
13	Oxford Cheetahs	48	11	1	36	23

+Hull Angels withdrew and were replaced by Swindon.

== Fixtures & results ==
=== A fixtures ===
Home \ Away	EX	HAL	HAN	HAS	LEI	LIV	OX	PLY	PP	RAY	S/H	TAM	YAR
Exeter		36–48	48–36	61–23	38–44	60–24	60–24	44–40	54–30	48–35	48–36	49–35	40–42
Halifax	34–49		47–35	59–24	58–26	39–44	66–18	54–29	62–22	62–22	57–26	62–22	37–45
Hanley	52–32	65–19		60–24	49–33	57–26	56–28	52–32	60–23	67–17	63–20	51–32	44–40
Hastings	48–36	58–25	40–44		56–28	51–33	61–23	52–31	55–28	65–16	45–39	51–33	39–45
Leicester	59–25	41–43	31–53	52–32		41–42	46–38	45–39	37–47	58–25	49–35	36–48	30–54
Liverpool	55–29	44–40	43–41	58–26	61–23		48–36	39–45	48–36	49–35	48–34	36–48	39–44
Oxford	51–33	42–42	23–60	37–47	35–49	37–46		40–43	33.5–50.5	41–37	32–51	32–52	25–59
Plymouth	44–40	52–32	54–30	48–32	49–34	54–29	53–31		35–47	46–38	59–25	50–34	57–27
Poole	45–39	46–37	41–43	60–23	44–39	50–33	51–33	37–46		53–31	44–40	33–50	53–31
Rayleigh	46–37	42–40	30–53	59–25	47–37	53–31	47–37	27–56	31–53		52–31	45–37	29–55
Swindon/Hull	40–44	37–46	40–43	47–37	53–30	53–31	60–24	44–40	54–30	62–22		43–41	42–42
Tamworth	55–28	52–30	41–43	47.5–36.5	60–24	56–28	65–19	57–27	44–40	55–29	53–30		55–29
Yarmouth	59–23	63–21	46–38	62–22	60–24	63–20	66–17	41–43	41–42	49–34	66–18	50–34	

Legend: Blue = home team win; Yellow = draw; Red = away team win.

=== B fixtures ===
Home \ Away	EX	HAL	HAN	HAS	LEI	LIV	OX	PLY	PP	RAY	S/H	TAM	YAR
Exeter		42–41	32–52	52–31	57–27	57–27	52–30	47–36	45–38	60–24	58–26	53–31	53–31
Halifax	49–35		55–29	67–17	58–25	46–38	60–24	58–26	64–20	64–20	62–22	50–34	37–44
Hanley	50–34	48–35		56–28	60–24	58–24	57–27	60–24	61–23	47–34	64–19	51–32	39–44
Hastings	44–40	43–40	40–44		53–31	55–28	50–34	42–42	46–38	63–21	54–30	39.5–44.5	41–43
Leicester	40–43	42–42	34–50	46–38		55–29	52–32	52–32	56–27	56–28	57–27	38–46	35–49
Liverpool	49–35	35–48	49–35	49–35	36–47		53–30	41–43	41–43	47–37	48–36	40–44	45–39
Oxford	41–42	46–38	38–46	47–37	46–38	45–39		33–51	51–33	49–35	54–29	31–53	43–41
Plymouth	51–33	40–44	42–42	40–43	50–34	50–34	62–22		41–43	50–34	50–4	48–36	56–28
Poole	46–38	36–48	44–40	46–38	43–41	50–33	58–26	49–35		50–34	53–31	41–43	47–36
Rayleigh	42–40	40–44	34–50	49–35	50–33	52–32	37–47	33–51	34–50		51–33	48–34	39–44
Swindon/Hull	56–28	39–45	47–37	41–43	33–51	54–29	42–41	36–47	49–35	52–32		37–46	35–49
Tamworth	55–28	52–31	57–27	66–22	57–27	64–20	67–17	50–33	66–18	64–20	67–17		50–34
Yarmouth	51–33	55–26	44–38	58–26	63–21	63–21	57–27	58–24	57–26	53–31	60–24	50–33	

Legend: Blue = home team win; Yellow = draw; Red = away team win.

== Leading Averages ==
	Rider	Team	C.M.A.
1	Billy Bales	Yarmouth	10.44
2	Vic Emms	Halifax	10.33
3	Pete Lansdale	Plymouth	10.29
4	Norman Clay	Exeter	9.90
5	Harry Saunders	Tamworth	9.70

== National Trophy Stage One ==
- For Stage Two - see Stage Two
- For Stage Three - see Stage Three

The 1949 Trophy was the 12th edition of the Knockout Cup. The Trophy consisted of three stages; stage one was for the third division clubs, stage two was for the second division clubs and stage three was for the top-tier clubs. The winner of stage one would qualify for stage two and the winner of stage two would qualify for the third and final stage. Hanley Potters won stage one and therefore qualified for stage two.

Third Division Qualifying First round

Date	Team one	Score	Team two
07/04	Plymouth	54-54	Exeter
04/04	Exeter	62-45	Plymouth
15/04	Leicester	49-58	Hull
09/04	Hull	77-31	Leicester
14/04	Stoke Hanley	67-41	Liverpool
11/04	Liverpool	42-66	Stoke Hanley
19/04	Yarmouth	70-37	Rayleigh
16/04	Rayleigh	55-51	Yarmouth

Third Division Qualifying Second round

Date	Team one	Score	Team two
07/05	Stoke Hanley	75-33	Exeter
25/04	Exeter	57-51	Stoke Hanley
03/05	Yarmouth	75-33	Hastings
27/04	Hastings	52-55	Yarmouth
20/04	Halifax	48-59	Poole
11/04	Poole	70-38	Halifax
27/04	Tamworth	70-38	Hull
30/04	Hull	61-47	Tamworth

Third Division Qualifying semifinals

Date	Team one	Score	Team two
25/05	Tamworth	56-51	Stoke Hanley
14/05	Stoke Hanley	59-48	Tamworth
23/05	Poole	59-49	Yarmouth
17/05	Yarmouth	60-46	Poole

=== Qualifying final ===
First leg

4 June 1949

Hanley Potters Gil Blake 15 Ken Adams 14 Ray Harris 10 Frank Evans 9 Lindsay Mitchell 7 Les Jenkins 6 Stan Bradbury 6 Dave Anderson 0	67 – 40	Yarmouth Bloaters Billy Bales 10 Sid Hipperson 10 Bill Carruthers 5 Reg Morgan 4 Cliff Ladbrooke 4 Johnny White 4 Tip Mills 2 Stan Page 1

Sun Street Stadium
Attendance: 12,900

Second leg

7 June 1949

Yarmouth Bloaters Billy Bales 15 Reg Morgan 11 Tip Mills 11 Johnny White 10 Bill Carruthers 5 Cliff Ladbrooke 4 Stan Page 3 Sid Hipperson 2	61 – 46	Hanley Potters Les Jenkins 12 Ken Adams 11 Gil Blake 10 Ray Harris 6 Stan Bradbury 3 Frank Evans 2 Lindsay Mitchell 2 Dave Anderson 0

Yarmouth Stadium

== Riders & final averages ==
Exeter

- Norman Clay 9.77
- Don Hardy 8.70
- Arthur Pilgrim 7.32
- Hugh Geddes 7.16
- Stan Hodson 6.63
- Vic Gent 6.51
- Stan Lanfear 5.98
- Johnny Myson 5.45
- Bronco Slade 4.80
- John Hancox 4.36
- Goog Hoskin 2.59

Halifax

- Vic Emms 10.33
- Arthur Forrest 9.06
- Dick Seers 8.76
- Bill Crosland 6.85
- Jock Shead 6.38
- Al Allison 6.24
- Jack Hughes 6.10
- Jack Dawson 5.92
- Ray Johnson 5.78
- Ken Brown 4.31
- Eric Smith 3.22
- Eric Mason 2.92

Hanley

- Vic Pitcher 9.78
- Les Jenkins 9.38
- Ken Adams 9.24
- Gil Blake 9.19
- Lindsay Mitchell 8.54
- Ray Harris 8.26
- Bill Harris 8.09
- Frank Evans 5.82
- Stan Bradbury 5.59
- Brian Pritchett 5.04
- Johnny Fitzpatrick 4.87
- Dave Anderson 3.36

Hastings

- Jock Grierson 9.06
- Ken Middleditch 8.99
- Buddy Fuller 7.69
- Ron Clark 6.54
- Norman Street 5.59
- Harold McNaughton 5.53
- Ken Smith 5.41
- Dan English 5.33
- Harold Tapscott 4.74
- Ken Tidbury 4.94
- George Butler 4.75

Hull/Swindon

- Bob Baker 8.73/x
- Mick Mitchell 8.43/7.13
- Alf Webster 7.24/5.67
- Derek Glover 6.67/4.83
- Bob Jones x/6.08
- George Craig 5.66/6.69
- Bill Downton x/5.23
- Johnny Green 4.51/x
- Jack Watts 4.49/x
- Norman Johnson 4.29/x
- Reg Lambourne x/4.24
- Harry Hughes x/2.53
- Tom Wilson x/2.20
- Ken Allick 2.14/x

Leicester

- Vic Pitcher 8.07
- Cyril Page 7.35
- Ron Wilson 6.23
- Jack Baxter 6.17
- Harwood Pike 6.13
- Sid Hipperson 6.13
- Johnny Carpenter 6.07
- Jack Winstanley 5.90
- Roy Duke 5.60
- Ted Rawlinson 5.40
- George Gower 5.38
- Ernest Palmer 4.87
- Ted Moore 3.56
- Syd van der Vyver 3.45

Liverpool

- Alex Gray 8.55
- Harry Welch 7.91
- Doug Serrurier 6.44
- Fred Wills 5.99
- Charlie Oates 5.64
- George Bason 5.12
- Stan Bedford 4.98
- Reg Duval 4.95
- Angus McGuire 4.94
- Ron Burnett 4.35
- Ernie Steers 4.00
- Percy Brine 4.00
- Tom Turnham 3.00

Oxford

- Dennis Gray 8.20
- Bob McFarlane 7.94
- Bert Croucher 7.02
- Alf Viccary 5.60
- Frank Boyle 5.34
- Bil Kemp 5.10
- Jimmy Wright 4.20
- Alf Elliott 4.02
- Ernie Rawlins 3.96
- Jimmy Coy 3.91
- Bill Reynolds 3.58

Plymouth

- Pete Lansdale 10.29
- Len Read 9.22
- Peter Robinson 8.52
- George Wall 6.14
- Ivan Kessell 5.39
- Johnny Bradford 4.57
- Alan Smith 5.14
- Bob Wigg 4.32
- Bonny Waddell 4.00
- Wally Matthews 3.13
- Toby Boschoff 1.83

Poole

- Cyril Quick 8.47
- Allan Chambers 8.38
- Fred Pawson 8.29
- Dick Howard 6.94
- Ticker James 5.49
- Charlie Hayden 5.43
- Ken James 4.55
- Terry Small 4.17
- Frank Holcombe 4.13
- Ray Bartlett 2.80
- Frank Wheeler 2.09

Rayleigh

- Les McGillivray 7.33
- Pat Clark 6.55
- Jim Gregory 6.45
- Jack Unstead 6.16
- Percy Brine 5.95
- Ron Howes 5.55
- Vic Gooden 5.04
- Roy Uden 4.74
- Wally Mawdsley 4.58
- Doug Ible 3.43
- Charlie Mugford 3.27

Tamworth

- Harry Saunders 9.73
- Bill Dalton 8.40
- Peter Orpwood 8.28
- Basil Harris 7.94
- Steve Langton 7.05
- Cecil Hookham 6.54
- Lionel Watling 6.56
- Ray Beaumont 5.70

Yarmouth

- Billy Bales 10.60
- Tip Mills 8.61
- Bill Carruthers 8.13
- Reg Morgan 7.94
- Bert Rawlinson 7.21
- Cliff Ladbrooke 7.14
- Fred Brand 7.03
- John White 6.72
- Sid Hipperson 6.65
- Stan Page 5.62
- Joe Rodwell 4.29

== See also ==
- List of United Kingdom Speedway League Champions
- Knockout Cup (speedway)
