= Bert Roger =

British speedway rider

- Born: 5 January 1920; Elham, Kent, England
- Died: March 1995 (aged 75); Kent, England
- Nationality: British (English)

Career history
- 1946, 1953–1955: West Ham Hammers
- 1948: Exeter Falcons
- 1949–1952: New Cross Rangers
- 1956: Poole Pirates
- 1962: Plymouth Devils

Individual honours
- 1952: World Championship finalist (inj)

Team honours
- 1948: National League Div 3 Champion

Albert Otho Roger (1920–1995) better known as Bert Roger was a speedway rider from England. He earned 11 international caps for the England national speedway team.

== Speedway career ==
Roger rode in the top tier of British Speedway from 1948 to 1956, riding primarily for New Cross Rangers and West Ham Hammers. He was a leading rider in the early 1950s and finished in the top ten UK averages during the 1952 Speedway National League riding for New Cross.

Roger qualified for the final of the 1952 Individual Speedway World Championship but was unable to take his place due to injury.

== Family ==
Roger's brothers Bob and Cyril were both speedway riders and all three brothers rode at the same time for New Cross.
