= Cyril Roger =

British motorcycle speedway rider (1921–2015)

- Born: 27 December 1921; Ashford, Kent, England
- Died: 26 May 2015 (aged 93); Sutton Valence, England
- Nationality: British (English)

Career history
- 1947-1948: Exeter Falcons
- 1948-1953: New Cross Rangers
- 1953-1955, 1959-1960: Norwich Stars
- 1956: Poole Pirates
- 1957: Ipswich Witches
- 1961-1963: Southampton Saints

Individual honours
- 1950: London Riders' Championship

Team honours
- 1948, 1962: National League Champion
- 1948: National League Div 3 Champion
- 1961: National League KO Cup Winner
- 1955, 1961: National Trophy winner

Cyril Manners Roger (27 December 1921 – 26 May 2015) was an international motorcycle speedway, who rider reached the final of Speedway World Championship five times. He earned 25 international caps for the England national speedway team.

== Career ==
Roger started his career with the Exeter Falcons in 1947 on loan from the New Cross Rangers. Until July 1948, he was part of the Falcons team that won the National League Division Three Championship, but was recalled by New Cross. He featured in ten outings for New Cross, and received a medal when they won the National League Division One title in the same season.

In 1949, Roger joined the Rangers full-time and qualified for the first of his five World Final appearances. In 1950, Roger won the prestigious London Riders' Championship and made his debut for England.

Roger stayed with New Cross until 1953, making two further World Final appearances in the meantime, before joining the Norwich Stars when the Rangers closed. A season with the Poole Pirates in 1956 was followed with a season with the Ipswich Witches where he broke his leg.

Roger returned to racing in 1959 with the Norwich Stars where he stayed for two seasons before finishing his career after three seasons with the Southampton Saints in 1963.

== World final appearances ==
- 1949 - (England) London, Wembley Stadium - 10th - 7pts
- 1950 - (England) London, Wembley Stadium - Res - 5pts
- 1952 - (England) London, Wembley Stadium - 15th - 2pts
- 1955 - (England) London, Wembley Stadium - 16th - 0pts
- 1959 - (England) London, Wembley Stadium - 16th - 0pts

== Family ==
Roger's brothers Bob and Bert were both speedway riders and all three brothers rode at the same time for New Cross.
