= Don Hardy (speedway rider) =

British speedway rider

- Born: 9 April 1921; Boveridge, Dorset, England
- Died: 7 March 2018 (aged 96)
- Nationality: British (English)

Career history
- 1947–1955: Exeter Falcons
- 1947, 1949: New Cross Rangers

Team honours
- 1948: League champion (div 3)
- 1951: National Trophy (div 3)

Donald Sidney Hardy (9 April 1921 – 7 March 2018) was an English motorcycle speedway rider.

== Biography ==
Hardy, born in Boveridge, Dorset, began his speedway career after being signed by New Cross Rangers for the 1947 Speedway National League season. However, he was loaned out to Exeter Falcons in division three and made an immediate impact with the Devon club, averaging 7.86 from 40 matches.

The following season during the 1948 Speedway National League Division Three campaign, Hardy helped Exeter win the league title. Hardy became one of the leading riders in the division and became a crowd favourite of the Falcons. He continued to perform well, averaging 8.70 in 1949 and then impressed with a 9.69 average for the 1950 Speedway National League Division Three season. He had previously made an official transfer to Exeter from New Cross in May 1949.

In 1951, Hardy was part of the Falcons team that won the National Trophy (div 3) and finished runner-up behind Poole Pirates in the league.

Hardy spent four more seasons with the Falcons from 1952 through to the end of the 1955 Speedway National League Division Two season.

Hardy died in 2018 aged 96.
