= Roy Craighead =

British motorcycle speedway rider

- Craighead in 1951
- Born: 11 September 1916; Ilford, London, England
- Died: 17 March 2007 (aged 90)
- Nationality: British (English)

Career history
- 1946–1948: Wembley Lions
- 1949–1951: Southampton Saints
- 1951–1952, 1954: Poole Pirates
- 1953–1954: Norwich Stars
- 1956, 1960–1961: Rayleigh Rockets

Team honours
- 1946, 1947: League champion (tier 1)
- 1948: National Trophy (tier 1)
- 1946, 1948: London Cup
- 1947: British Speedway Cup
- 1952: League champion (tier 2)
- 1952: National Trophy (tier 2)
- 1951: League champion (tier 3)

Roy Allan Craighead (11 September 1916 – 17 March 2007) was a motorcycle speedway rider from England.

== Biography ==
Craighead, born in Ilford, London, began his British leagues career riding for Wembley Lions during the 1946 Speedway National League season. His first league season proved to be extremely successful, winning both the league title and London Cup with his team. He remained with Wembley for two more seasons and picked up more silverware, after winning the league title and British Speedway Cup in 1947 and the National Trophy and London Cup in 1948.

In 1949, Craighead joined Southampton Saints in exchange for Alf Bottoms, where he spent two seasons He also reached the Championship round of the 1949 Individual Speedway World Championship and averaged 8.36 for Southampton in 1950. Mid-way through the 1951 season, he was forced to find a new club following the withdrawal of Southampton from the league. He switched to another south coast team in the form of Poole Pirates and would help them win the league that season. His knack of riding for a team that would win trophies continued as Poole moved up to division 2 and won the league and cup double.

Craighead rode for Norwich Stars in 1953 and the beginning of 1954 before deciding to quite racing for a while. He returned to ride for Rayleigh Rockets a couple of times in 1956 and more regularly in 1960 and 1961.
