= Arthur Bush =

English motorcycle speedway rider (born 1925)

- Born: 26 February 1925; Dalston, London
- Died: 1982 (aged 56–57)
- Nationality: British (English)

Career history
- 1948: Bristol Bulldogs
- 1948, 1953: Yarmouth Bloaters
- 1949-1950: Harringay Racers
- 1950: Liverpool Chads
- 1951-1953: Bradford Tudors

Team honours
- 1948: British Div 2

Arthur Thomas Bush (26 February 1925 – 1982) was an English international motorcycle speedway rider. He earned five international caps for the England national speedway team.

== Biography ==
Bush was born in Dalston, London on 26 February 1925. He served as a Royal Navy petty officer during World War II before signing for Harringay Racers in the top division of British speedway during June 1947. He was described as a protégé of Vic Duggan.

In 1948, Bush was loaned out to Bristol Bulldogs in the second division, where he made just a small contribution to their league winning season because later in the season he was loaned out to Yarmouth Bloaters, during the 1948 Speedway National League Division Three season.

In 1949, Bush finally secured a spot in the Harringay Racers team and remained with Harringay for 1950 but was loaned out to Liverpool Chads during the second half of the season.

Bush's career at Harringay never really took off and before the 1951 season, Harringay signed Jack Biggs from Bradford Tudors for £1,000, in a deal that also saw the exchange of Bush and fellow rider Alf Viccary. However, his form at Bradford improved to the extent that he was selected by England to represent them in the 1951 winter test series tour of Australia.

Bush spent the following two seasons with Bradford from 1952 to 1953 but during his last season in 1953 with them, he was transferred to Yarmouth in the second division.
