= Wally Green =

English speedway rider (1918–2007)

- Green in 1950
- Born: 25 February 1918; London, England
- Died: 11 December 2006 (aged 88); Barnet, England
- Nationality: British (English)

Career history
- 1946–1947, 1949–1955: West Ham Hammers
- 1947: Eastbourne Eagles
- 1948: Hastings Saxons

Team honours
- 1947: National League Div III Champion

Walter Stanley Green (25 February 1918 – 11 December 2006) was an international motorcycle speedway rider who finished second in the World Championship final in 1950. He earned 6 international caps for the England national speedway team.

== Career ==
Green started his career with the West Ham Hammers in 1946 after being spotted at a training school run by Dicky Case. He was not a regular in the side at that time, so in 1947 he was loaned to the Eastbourne Eagles where he won the National League Division Three championship and finished as the Eagles' top rider. He was still making a few appearances for the Hammers. He and Jock Grierson formed a partnership at Eastbourne that became known as the 'Terrible Twins' due to the fact that nobody could beat the pair in a heat.

When the Eastbourne closed down at the end of 1947, Green moved with the promotion along the south coast to Hastings with the Saxons. Green set the track record at Hastings and in the opening meeting on 21 April 1948, he won all six of his rides. He again finished the season as the top rider. His form did not go unnoticed by West Ham star Aub Lawson and in 1948 he returned to the Hammers full-time.

In 1949, Green made steady progress and became a team regular. Green made his only appearance in a World final in 1950 and finished second, just a point behind the winner Freddie Williams. Again in 1950 he was second in the West Ham averages. He also captained England national speedway team in 1954.

Green stayed with the Hammers for the rest of his career. The club closed in 1955 and Green retired in the same season due to ill health.

== World Final appearances ==
- 1950 – (England) London, Wembley Stadium – 2nd – 13pts

== Bike building ==
Green was a renowned bike frame builder whose business was based in Hendon. He built frames to order and could name racing cyclist Alf Engers as a customer.
