= Fred Pawson =

British motorcycle speedway rider

- Born: 10 March 1923; Camberwell, London, England
- Died: December 2008 (aged 85); New Zealand
- Nationality: British (English)/New Zealander

Career history
- 1948–1949: Poole Pirates
- 1950–1951: Harringay Racers
- 1951–1954: Norwich Stars

Team honours
- 1951: League champion (tier 2)
- 1951: Knockout Cup
- 1951: Southern Shield

Frederick Henry Pawson (10 March 1923 – December 2008) was an international motorcycle speedway rider from England. He earned five international caps for the England national speedway team.

== Biography ==
Pawson, born in Camberwell, London, began his British leagues career riding a couple of times for Eastbourne Eagles during the 1947 Speedway National League Division Three season. His first full season was with Poole Pirates during the 1948 Speedway National League Division Three season. After a strong 1949 season for Poole, where he averaged 8.29, he signed for Harringay Racers in the top division and made a decent start.

In 1951, Pawson became a Norwich Stars rider and during his first season with them secured a National League (division 2) and Knockout Cup double. He remained at Norwich from 1951 to 1954.

Pawson represented England in international fixtures and also rode for Palmerston North during the England teams visit to New Zealand in 1952. His experiences in New Zealand led him to making the decision to retire from speedway in 1954 and emigrate to New Zealand. He gained New Zealand citizenship and died in 2008.
