= Jimmy Squibb =

British motorcycle speedway rider (1921 – 2004)

- Born: 21 November 1921; Poole, England
- Died: 30 August 2004 (aged 82); Torquay, England

Career history
- 1947–1951, 1957–1959: Southampton Saints
- 1951: Harringay Racers
- 1952–1956, 1959, 1973: Poole Pirates
- 1960–1962: Ipswich Witches
- 1962: Plymouth Devils
- 1963: New Cross Rangers
- 1963–1969, 1972: Exeter Falcons
- 1970–1972: Cradley Heathens
- 1973: Newport
- 1973: Eastbourne Eagles
- 1974–1975: Canterbury Crusaders

Team honours
- 1952, 1955: league champion (tier 2)
- 1952, 1955: National Trophy (tier 2)
- 1948: National Trophy (tier 3)

Cyril Maurice Squibb (21 November 1921 – 30 August 2004) (known as Jimmy Squibb during his speedway career) was an international motorcycle speedway rider from England. He earned four international caps for the England national speedway team and four caps for the Great Britain team.

== Biography ==
Squibb, born in Poole, began his British leagues career riding for Southampton Saints during the 1947 Speedway National League Division Three season. He helped Southampton win the National Trophy in 1948, became the club captain and continued to be a prominent rider for the south coast team until midway through the 1951 season, when Southampton withdrew from the league. He needed a new club and was signed by Harringay Racers for a fee of £800, to ride in the top division.

In 1952, Squibb was approached by Wigan under a new promotion but eventually left Harringay for his home town club Poole Pirates, which turned out to be a good move because the club won the league and cup double. He rode five seasons for Poole from 1952 to 1956 and won another league and cup double in 1955.

Squibb's final season at Poole was in the top division of British speedway and was one to forget because he was involved in a horrific crash that resulted in the death of Malcolm Flood in April 1956.

Squibb returned to Southampton from 1957 to halfway through the 1959 season, when he switched to Poole again. In 1960, he moved to join the Ipswich Witches and was with them up to the point when they withdrew from the league in 1962. This forced a move to the Provincial League with Plymouth Devils, where he topped the team averages at 9.74.

Another fractured season followed in 1963, which saw Squibb's new club New Cross Rangers disband and Squibb join Exeter Falcons for the remainder of the season. He found stability in 1964 with Exeter and was with them in 1965 when the new British league was formed. Squibb had previously captained Great Britain and continued to perform at a high level and as he entered his 24th year of racing he joined Cradley Heathens for the 1970 British League season.

Squibb raced with Eastbourne Eagles in 1973 and Canterbury Crusaders in 1974 and 1975, the latter his 29th and final season.
