= Poole Pirates =

English motorcycle speedway team

Club information
- Track address: Poole Stadium; Wimborne Road; Poole; Dorset
- Country: England
- Founded: 1948
- Promoter: Matt Ford & Danny Ford
- Team manager: Neil Middleditch
- Team captain: Zach Cook
- League: SGB Championship
- Website: Official website

Club facts
- Colours: Blue and white
- Track size: 299.1M
- Track record time: 56.91 seconds
- Track record date: 14 June 2006
- Track record holder: Antonio Lindbäck

Current team
Rider	CMA
(England) Richard Lawson	9.58
(England) Kyle Newman	4.81
(England) Lewis Kerr	6.77
(Australia) Zach Cook (C)	7.34
(Australia) Fraser Bowes	5.63
(England) Cooper Rushen	2.00
(England) Will Cairns	3.81
Total	39.95

Major team honours
British Champions	1969, 1994, 2003, 2004, 2008, 2011, 2013, 2014, 2015, 2018
Division 1 Knockout Cup	2003, 2004, 2010, 2011, 2012
Pairs Champions	2007, 2009, 2011
Fours Champions	1994
Elite Shield	2012, 2014, 2015, 2016
British League Cup	2003
Craven Shield	2001, 2002, 2006
Division 2 Champions	1952, 1955, 1961, 1962, 1989, 1990, 2021, 2022, 2024, 2025
Division 2 Knockout Cup	1952, 1955, 2021, 2022, 2024, 2025
BSN Series	2023, 2024
Division 3	1951

Poole Pirates are a motorcycle speedway team based in Poole, England, competing in the SGB Championship. The club have been the League Champions of Great Britain on ten occasions.

Poole Speedway is promoted by local businessman Matt Ford and son Danny Ford, who took over promoting rights of the club in 1998. The team is managed by past rider and former Great Britain team manager Neil Middleditch. Poole Stadium (known as Wimborne Road when speedway takes place) has been home to the club since it was founded in 1948.

== History ==
=== Origins and 1940s ===
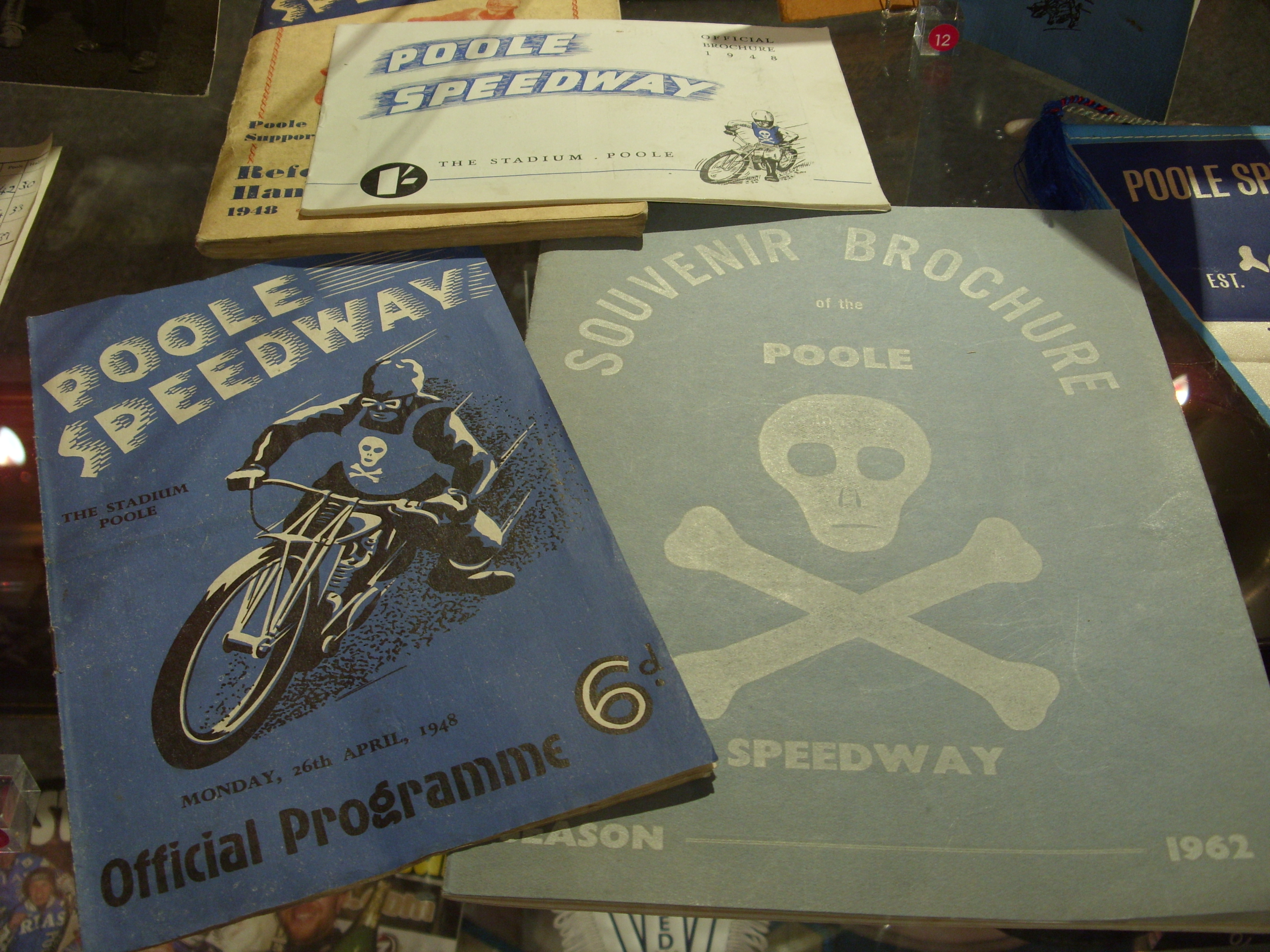
Two Poole Speedway programmes from 1948 and 1962 on display at Poole Museum

In 1947, Bournemouth based Exeter Falcons riders Tommy Crutcher and Charlie Hayden created a consortium, which also included Crutcher's brother Jack and Herby Hayden, with the aim of opening a speedway club closer to their home. The consortium applied to Poole Borough Council in 1947 to stage speedway racing in the town and the council approved their request on 6 January 1948.

The home ground of the Poole Pirates would be Poole Stadium, which had been used primarily by Poole Town F.C. up to that point. The cycle track around the football pitch was replaced by a speedway track in preparation for the 1948 Speedway National League Division Three season. The first fixture held by the team was away to Tamworth Hounds, on 14 April 1948 and the first home match followed shortly afterwards, on 26 April against Yarmouth Bloaters.

Terry Small was signed for 1949, as the team improved on their inaugural season by finishing sixth.

=== 1950s ===
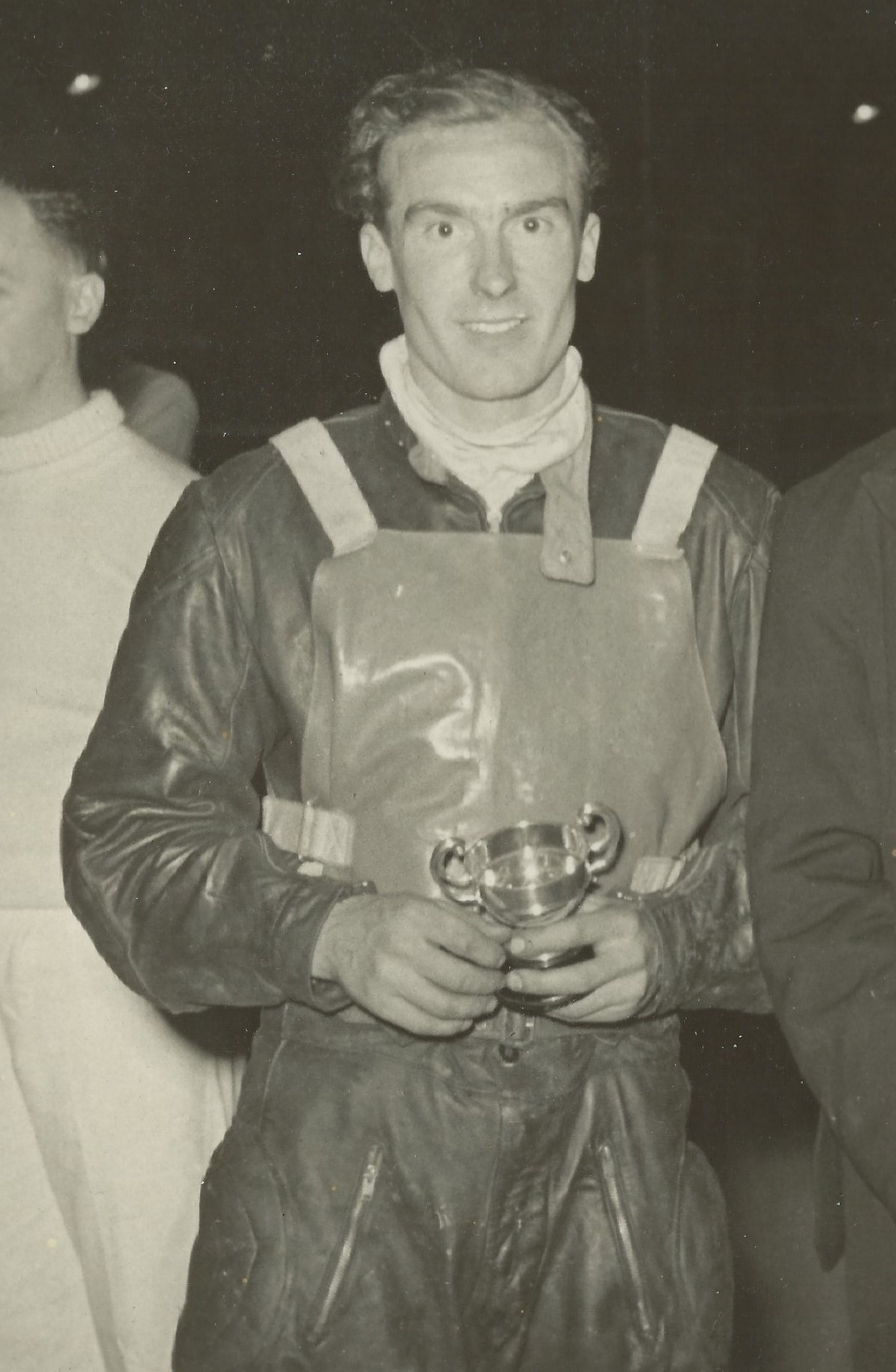
Bill Holden was part of the Poole team that experienced a golden era during the 1950s

Tony Lewis and Ken Middleditch (the latter signed from Hastings) formed an effective pairing for the Pirates in 1950. Middleditch topped the league averages that season and led the Pirates to the runner-up position behind Oxford Cheetahs. Poole strengthened the team further by bringing in Brian Crutcher, Bill Holden and Roy Craighead, which resulted in the Pirates winning their first title in 1951 and subsequently being promoted to the National League Division Two. Crutcher became the first Poole rider to reach a World Speedway Final in 1952 and Ken Middleditch won the Riders' Championship.

Poole won the Division Two title and National Trophy (tier 2) double at the first attempt, but were denied first division status by the Speedway Control Board, who claimed that Poole were not a big enough club to be able to sustain top flight racing. The following two years (1953 and 1954) saw the Pirates narrowly finishing as Division Two runners up. Brian Crutcher left Poole for Wembley at the start of the 1953 season but Ken Middleditch won a second Riders' Championshiop in 1954.

In 1955, the Pirates again won the league and National Trophy double and were allowed promotion to division oOne of the National League, becoming the only club to ever have won promotion from the bottom league to the top tier. However, by the end of the 1956 season, the Poole promoters closed the club, blaming poor attendances and the introduction of fuel rationing due to the Suez Crisis. Despite losing their league status, Poole Stadium continued to stage meetings during 1957, including two National League meetings. Rayleigh Rockets promoter Vic Gooden took over the promoting rights of Poole at the end of the year and transferred his team to Poole, who rejoined the National League in 1958.

=== 1960s ===
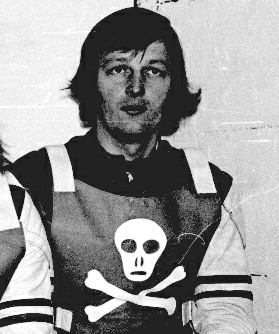
Pete Smith scored 3,287 points for the club

Southampton Saints promoter Charles Knott took over from Vic Gooden in 1960 and brought back the successful pairing of Middleditch and Lewis. Ross Gilbertson was also signed and Geoff Mudge was brought over from Australia. The stadium was also redeveloped in 1960, with the track being made slightly smaller to accommodate a greyhound racing track. A sheltered 1,100 seat grandstand was erected on the home straight and is still in use. The league structure was re-formed and Poole opted to join the newly formed Provincial League. Poole finished joint top of the table with Rayleigh, but lost out on points difference. However, success returned to Poole with the Provincial League title in 1961 and 1962.

Following a power struggle between the Speedway Control Board and speedway club promoters, the British League was formed in 1965. Poole joined the British League (the top league Division) with 18 other teams and remained there for the next 20 years. They won the British League title in 1969 with Pete Smith, who would eventually go on to score over 3,287 points for the club, the biggest contributor. Smith was supported with contributions from team captain Geoff Mudge, Bruce Cribb, Gordon Guasco, Frank Shuter and Odd Fossengen who was in his second year at Poole and would become a fans favourite.

=== 1970s ===
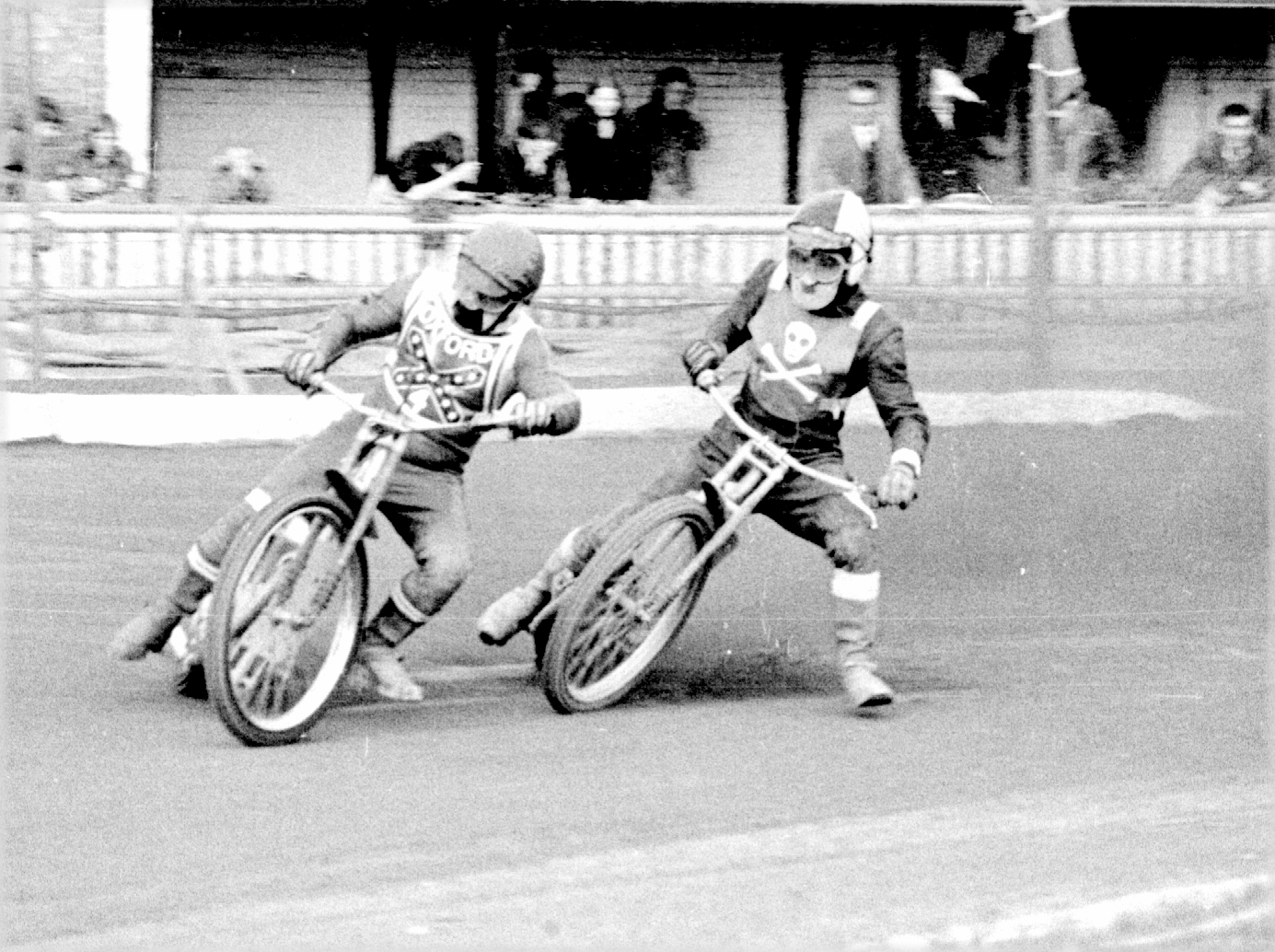
Poole (Gooddy) racing at Oxford in 1974

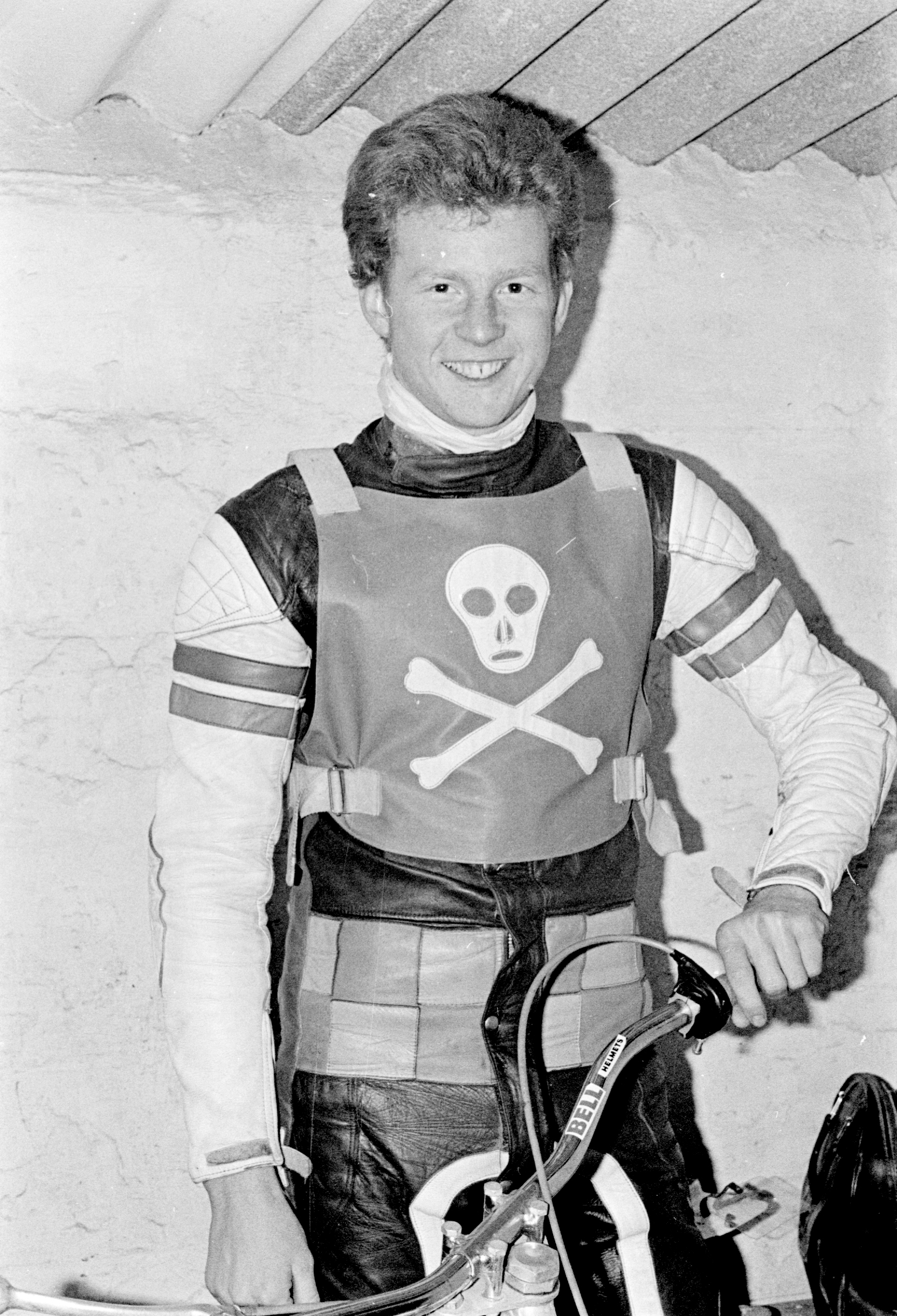
Neil Middleditch (son of Ken), signed in 1974

Poole continued to race in the British League and major changes in personnel took place in 1974, with the arrival of riders such as Colin Gooddy and Neil Middleditch, son of former rider Ken Middleditch. In 1975, Poole completed the signing of Malcolm Simmons from King's Lynn. Simmons finished top of the Poole riders averages for the next six seasons and in 1976 finished in second place at the Speedway World Championship.

Mid-way through the 1979 season, Reg Fearman bought the promoting rights to run the club but ultimately the decade was one of mediocrity.

=== 1980s ===
Fearman continued to promote the club until 1984, when financial debts of £200,000 forced the club to close. However, the club was rescued by the then Weymouth Wildcats promoters Peter Ansell and Mervyn Stewkesbury, who moved their team to Poole for the start of the 1985 season. The team name was changed to the Poole Wildcats and they entered the National League – the second league tier of speedway. The name change proved to be unpopular and was reverted to the Poole Pirates after two seasons, although the Wildcats did finish runner-up in the league during both the 1985 and 1986 seasons.

Australian manager Neil Street was appointed as Poole team manager and an influx of young Australian riders began to arrive, including Craig Boyce in 1988 and Leigh Adams in 1989. Poole finished as National League runners up 1988, were National League champions in 1989.

=== 1990s ===
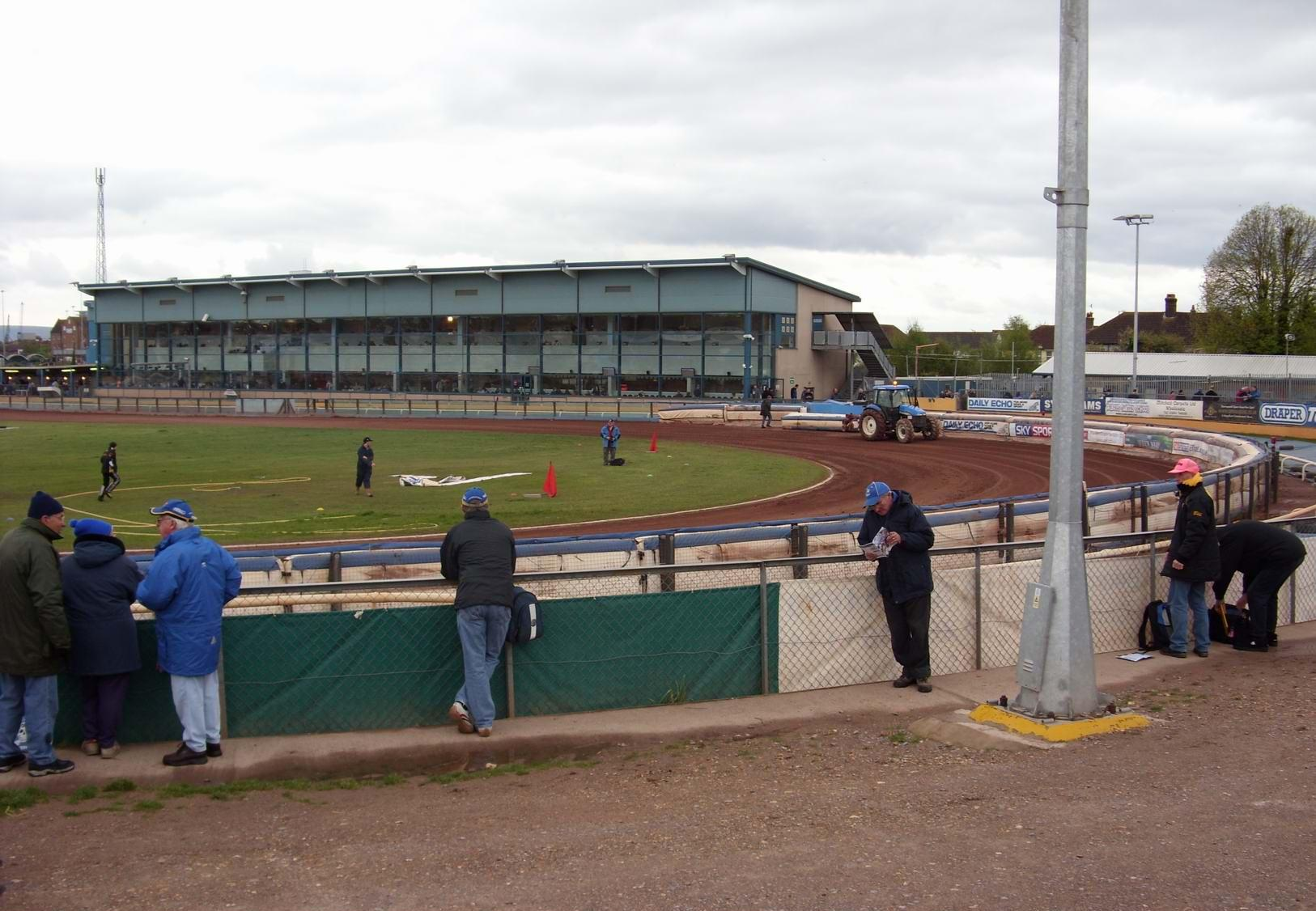
The glass fronted grandstand built in 1997

Led by captain Alun Rossiter and despite losing Leigh Adams, the Pirates won the League and Knockout Cup double in 1990. After the 1990 season, Poole re-joined the top flight of speedway – the British League. Poole won the league championship in 1994 led by Boyce, 1993 signing Lars Gunnestad, veteran Steve Schofield and a young Jason Crump, grandson of manager Neil Street. The Pirates also won the fours championship final, held at the East of England Arena on 7 August.

In 1997, the structure of the leagues was once again changed with Poole joining the Elite League. The terracing on the back straight of the speedway track was demolished in 1997 and replaced with a new glass fronted grandstand incorporating a 440-seat restaurant, two bars, Tote betting facilities and multiple viewing screens. The speedway track was reduced in size to 299.1 metres (981 ft) to accommodate a new greyhound track. Stadia UK were issued a long-term lease on the stadium by the council, with the Pirates promotion sub-leasing use of the stadium and facilities from Stadia UK.

Poole initially struggled in the Elite League and were sold to local businessmen Matt Ford and Mike Golding in 1998. In a clear out at the club, only Magnus Zetterström remained from the 1998 season and Neil Street was replaced as manager by former rider Neil Middleditch. Craig Boyce left for Oxford Cheetahs, Lee Richardson was signed from Reading Racers, Gary Havelock was brought in as captain and Mark Loram was signed from Wolverhampton Wolves. Poole finished as Elite League runner up in 1999.

=== 2000s ===
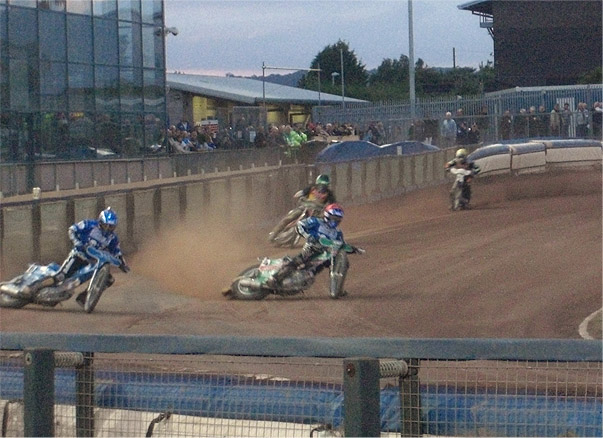
The Poole riders lead Coventry during an Elite League meeting in July 2008.

Mark Loram was to become the first Pirate to lift the World Championship title with his success in 2000 and in 2001, the Pirates signed Tony Rickardsson, won the World Championship that year. Rickardsson led the Pirates to another runner-up position during the league campaign, in addition to winning the Craven Shield.

In 2002, the club signed Bjarne Pedersen as they won another Craven Shield but it was Rickardsson who set the headlines for the season, winning another World Championship, the Riders' Championship and topping the league averages.

Leigh Adams re-joined the club in 2003, spearheading the team to a triple championship of Elite League, Knockout Cup and the British League Cup. The Pirates followed up 2003 with another successful year in 2004 despite the loss of Grand Prix rider Leigh Adams. Solid point scoring from Bjarne Pedersen, Antonio Lindback and Ryan Sullivan led Poole to an Elite League and Knockout Cup double and Poole became the first top flight club to achieve back to back League and Cup doubles since 1960.

After signing Chris Holder and re-signing Davey Watt and Krzysztof Kasprzak, the Pirates won their third Elite League championship in 2008, defeating the Lakeside Hammers in the play-off final with an aggregate score of 108–75.

The decade ended with Hans Andersen and Chris Holder winning the Elite League Pairs Championship, held at the Arlington Stadium on 8 August 2009. Poole operated a junior team called Bournemouth Buccaneers, in the National League in 2009.

=== 2010s ===
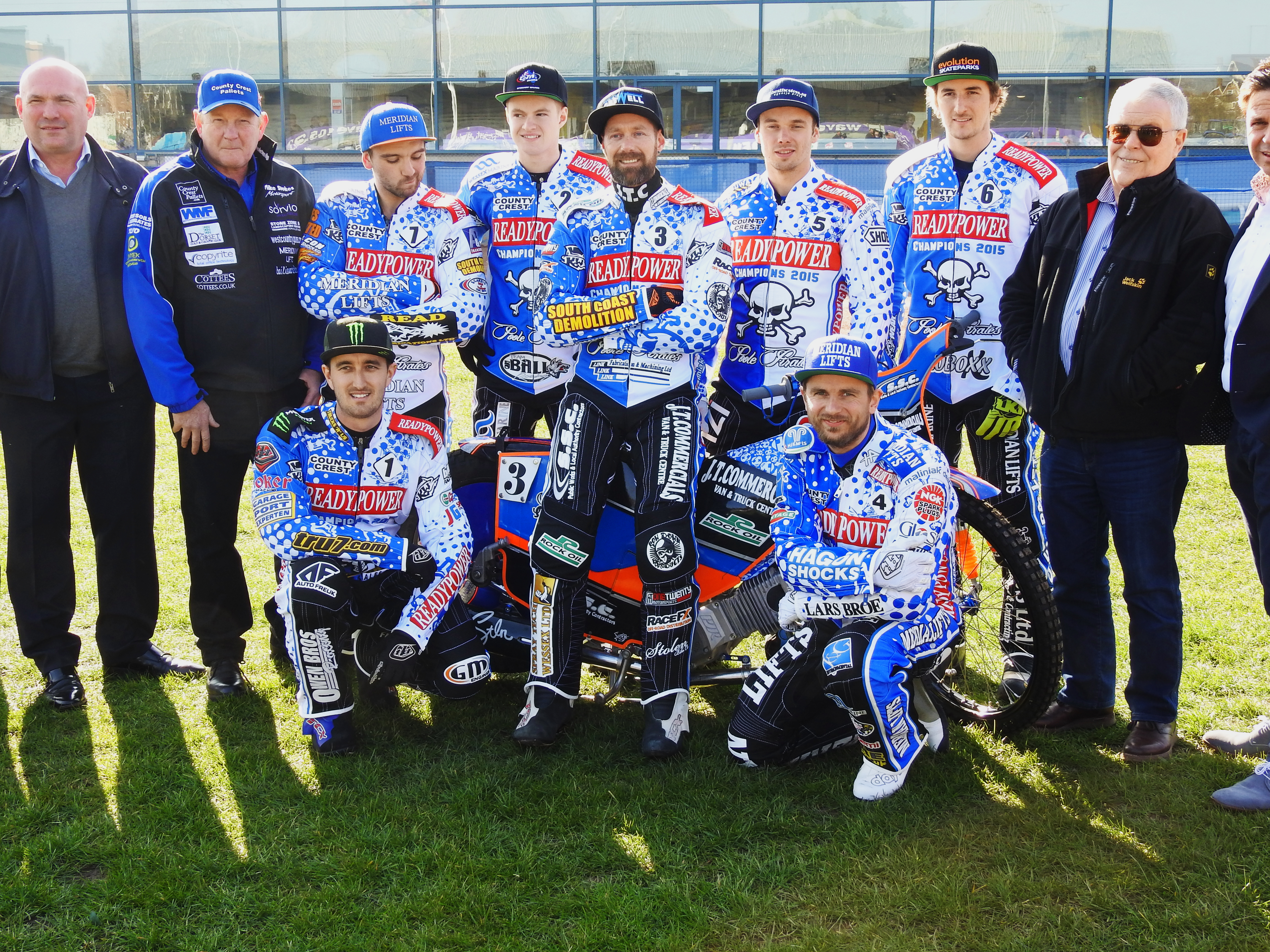
The 2016 Pirates

The Pirates finished 20 points clear of nearest rivals Wolves, during the 2010 season but lost to Coventry Bees in the play off final. The team did however take consolation from winning the Knockout Cup. The following season in 2011, the Pirates somewhat aggrieved after the 2010 season, dominated the league, led by Darcy Ward and Chris Holder and finished the season off by defeating the Eastbourne Eagles in the play-off final. They team completed a treble of trophy wins by winning the Knockout Cup and Pairs.

The success of Poole continued with a third consecutive Knockout Cup win in 2012. The Pirates were then crowned champions in three successive years during the 2013, 2014 and 2015 seasons. The team won their tenth highest league title after winning the SGB Premiership 2018.

The decade was Poole's most successful period of speedway throughout their history and the south coast team were the leading club during the decade, with many top riders appearing for the club, most notably Holder, Ward, Watt, Pedersen, Andersen and Maciej Janowski.

=== 2020s ===
After the leagues were cancelled in 2020 due to the COVID-19 pandemic, and the Pirates returned to action in the second tier SGB Championship. They finished top of the regular season table and secured a place in the playoff final against Glasgow, before winning the division 2 Knockout Cup for the third time in their history and then completed the league and cup double by winning the play off final. The team was led by Steve Worrall and Danny King.

The following season in 2022, the Pirate brought in Richard Lawson and the success continued as the team dominated again, winning the SGB Championship and Knockout Cup 'double double'. In 2023, despite winning the early season BSN Series, the Pirates suffered a shock play off final loss to Glasgow, which prevented a third consecutive league title win.

In 2024, the team made amends for the 2023 loss by winning their third league title and knockout cup in four years and securing a treble by winning the BSN Series.

== Season summary ==
Extended content

Year and league	League position	Notes
1948 Speedway National League Division Three	10th	
1949 Speedway National League Division Three	6th	
1950 Speedway National League Division Three	2nd	
1951 Speedway National League Division Three	1st	champions
1952 Speedway National League Division Two	1st	champions & national Trophy Div 2 winners
1953 Speedway National League Division Two	2nd	
1954 Speedway National League Division Two	2nd	
1955 Speedway National League Division Two	1st	champions & national Trophy Div 2 winners
1956 Speedway National League	6th	
1958 Speedway National League	9th	
1959 Speedway National League	6th	
1960 Provincial Speedway League	2nd	
1961 Provincial Speedway League	1st	champions
1962 Provincial Speedway League	1st	champions
1963 Provincial Speedway League	3rd	
1964 Provincial Speedway League	7th	
1965 British League season	10th	
1966 British League season	6th	
1967 British League season	6th	
1968 British League season	17th	
1969 British League season	1st	champions
1970 British League season	5th	
1971 British League season	11th	
1972 British League season	7th	
1973 British League season	14th	
1974 British League season	14th	
1975 British League season	15th	
1976 British League season	10th	
1977 British League season	10th	
1978 British League season	10th	
1979 British League season	12th	
1980 British League season	9th	
1981 British League season	9th	
1982 British League season	15th	
1983 British League season	13th	
1984 British League season	13th	
1985 National League season	2nd	
1986 National League season	2nd	
1987 National League season	8th	
1988 National League season	2nd	
1989 National League season	1st	champions
1990 National League season	1st	champions & Knockout Cup winners
1991 British League season	10th	
1992 British League season	3rd	
1993 British League season	10th	
1994 British League season	1st	champions
1995 Premier League speedway season	12th	
1996 Premier League speedway season	14th	
1997 Elite League speedway season	9th	
1998 Elite League speedway season	9th	
1999 Elite League speedway season	2nd	
2000 Elite League speedway season	5th	
2001 Elite League speedway season	2nd	Craven Shield winners
2002 Elite League speedway season	4th	Craven Shield winners
2003 Elite League speedway season	1st	PO winners & Knockout Cup winners
2004 Elite League speedway season	1st	PO winners & Knockout Cup winners
2005 Elite League speedway season	5th	
2006 Elite League speedway season	7th	Craven Shield winners
2007 Elite League speedway season	4th	PO semi final
2008 Elite League speedway season	1st	PO winners
2009 Elite League speedway season	8th	
2010 Elite League speedway season	1st	lost in PO final, Knockout Cup winners
2011 Elite League speedway season	1st	PO winners & Knockout Cup winners
2012 Elite League speedway season	1st	lost in PO final, Knockout Cup winners
2013 Elite League speedway season	4th	champions, won PO final
2014 Elite League speedway season	1st	champions, won PO final
2015 Elite League speedway season	1st	champions, won PO final, Elite Shield
2016 Elite League	2nd	PO semi final, Elite Shield
SGB Premiership 2017	4th	PO semi final, Elite Shield
SGB Premiership 2018	3rd	champions, won PO final
SGB Premiership 2019	1st	PO semi final
SGB Championship 2021	1st	Champions & KO Cup winners
SGB Championship 2022	1st	Champions & KO Cup winners
SGB Championship 2023	1st	PO final, BSN Series winners
SGB Championship 2024	1st	Champions, KO Cup winners, BSN Series winners
SGB Championship 2025	2nd	Champions, KO Cup winners

== Season summary (Juniors) ==
Extended content

Year and league	Position	Notes
2009 National League	1st	League & Knockout Cup Winners
2010 National League	5th	

== Honours ==
League

- British League / Elite League / SGB Premiership
  - Winners (10): 1969, 1994, 2003, 2004, 2008, 2011, 2013, 2014, 2015, 2018
- National League Division Two / Provincial League / National League / SGB Championship
  - Winners (9): 1952, 1955, 1961, 1962, 1989, 1990, 2021, 2022, 2024, 2025, 2026
- National League Division Three
  - Winners (1): 1951

Cup

- Elite League Knockout Cup
  - Winners (5): 2003, 2004, 2010, 2011, 2012
- National Trophy / National League Knockout Cup / SGB Championship Knockout Cup
  - Winners (6): 1952, 1955, 1990, 2021, 2022, 2024, 2025
- British League Cup
  - Winners (1): 2003
- Craven Shield
  - Winners (3): 2001, 2002 & 2006
- Elite Shield / Premiership Shield
  - Winners (6): 2012, 2014, 2015, 2016, 2017 & 2019
- Elite League Pairs Championship
  - Winners (3): 2007, 2009 & 2011
- BSN Series
  - Winners (2): 2023, 2024

== World Champions ==
- Mark Loram (2000).
- Tony Rickardsson (2001, 2002)
- Chris Holder (2012)

== Notable riders ==
- (Australia) Leigh Adams
- (Denmark) Hans Andersen
- (Australia) Craig Boyce*
- (Poland) Krzysztof Cegielski*
- (Australia) Ben Cook
- (England) Roy Craighead
- (Australia) Jason Crump
- (England) Brian Crutcher*
- (England) John Davis*
- (Norway) Odd Fossengen*
- (Scotland) Ross Gilbertson
- (Norway) Lars Gunnestad*
- (England) Gary Havelock
- (England) Charlie Hayden*
- (England) Bill Holden*
- (Australia) Chris Holder
- (England) Dennis James*
- (Poland) Maciej Janowski
- (Poland) Krzysztof Kasprzak
- (England) Danny King
- (England) Richard Lawson
- (England) Tony Lewis*
- (Sweden) Antonio Lindbäck
- (Sweden) Christer Löfqvist*
- (England) Mark Loram*
- (England) Ken Middleditch*
- (England) Neil Middleditch*
- (Australia) Geoff Mudge*
- (Denmark) Bjarne Pedersen
- (Sweden) Tony Rickardsson*
- (England) Alun Rossiter*
- (England) Steve Schofield*
- (England) Malcolm Simmons*
- (England) Terry Small*
- (England) Kevin Smith*
- (England) Pete Smith*
- (England) Jimmy Squibb
- (England) Norman Strachan*
- (Australia) Darcy Ward
- (Australia) Davey Watt
- (England) Steve Worrall
- (England) Martin Yeates*
- An asterisk indicates that the rider has been voted into the Pirates Hall of Fame by supporters.

== Testimonial riders ==
Eleven Poole riders have received testimonials at the club, usually for being a Poole asset for 10 years or more.

- (England) Pete Smith: 1976
- (England) Neil Middleditch: 1984 & 2022
- (England) Steve Schofield: 1995
- (England) Alun Rossiter: 2000
- (Norway) Lars Gunnestad: 2001
- (Australia) Craig Boyce: 2003
- (Sweden) Magnus Zetterström: 2005
- (Denmark) Bjarne Pedersen: 2009
- (Australia) Davey Watt: 2011
- (England) Steve Worrall: 2023
- (England) Richard Lawson: 2024
