= Alf Bottoms =

British motorcycle speedway rider

- Born: 20 June 1918; Kensington, London, England
- Died: 2 May 1951 (aged 32); Luxembourg
- Nationality: British (English)

Career history
- 1946–1947, 1949–1950: Wembley Lions
- 1948: Southampton Saints

Team honours
- 1946, 1949, 1950: League champion (tier 1)
- 1948: National Trophy (tier 3)
- 1946, 1949, 1950: London Cup

Alfred John Herbert Bottoms (20 June 1918 – 2 May 1951) was a motorcycle speedway rider from England.

== Biography ==
Bottoms, born in Kensington, London, began racing speedway in 1945, after appearing in various meetings. His British leagues career began when he rode for Wembley Lions during the 1946 Speedway National League season. He won the London Cup with Wembley in 1946.

During the winter, Bottoms bred chickens for a living and was due to ride for Wembley again in 1947 but had to go into hospital for two serious operations for internal problems. The operations were a success but he missed the entire season, with the exception of two matches. He took consolation in the fact that Wembley won both the league title and the British Speedway Cup.

In 1948, Bottoms joined Southampton Saints and had an impressive season, topping the division three league averages, with a remarkable 11.25 average and helped his club win the National Trophy. In 1949, he returned to Wembley in exchange for Roy Craighead. He won the league title and London Cup again with them during both the 1949 and 1950 seasons.

Bottoms died on 2 May 1951, at the age of 32, in a Formula Three car racing accident in Luxembourg.
