= The Pilot Field =

Football stadium in Hastings, East Sussex

Coordinates: 50°52′33″N 0°35′15″E

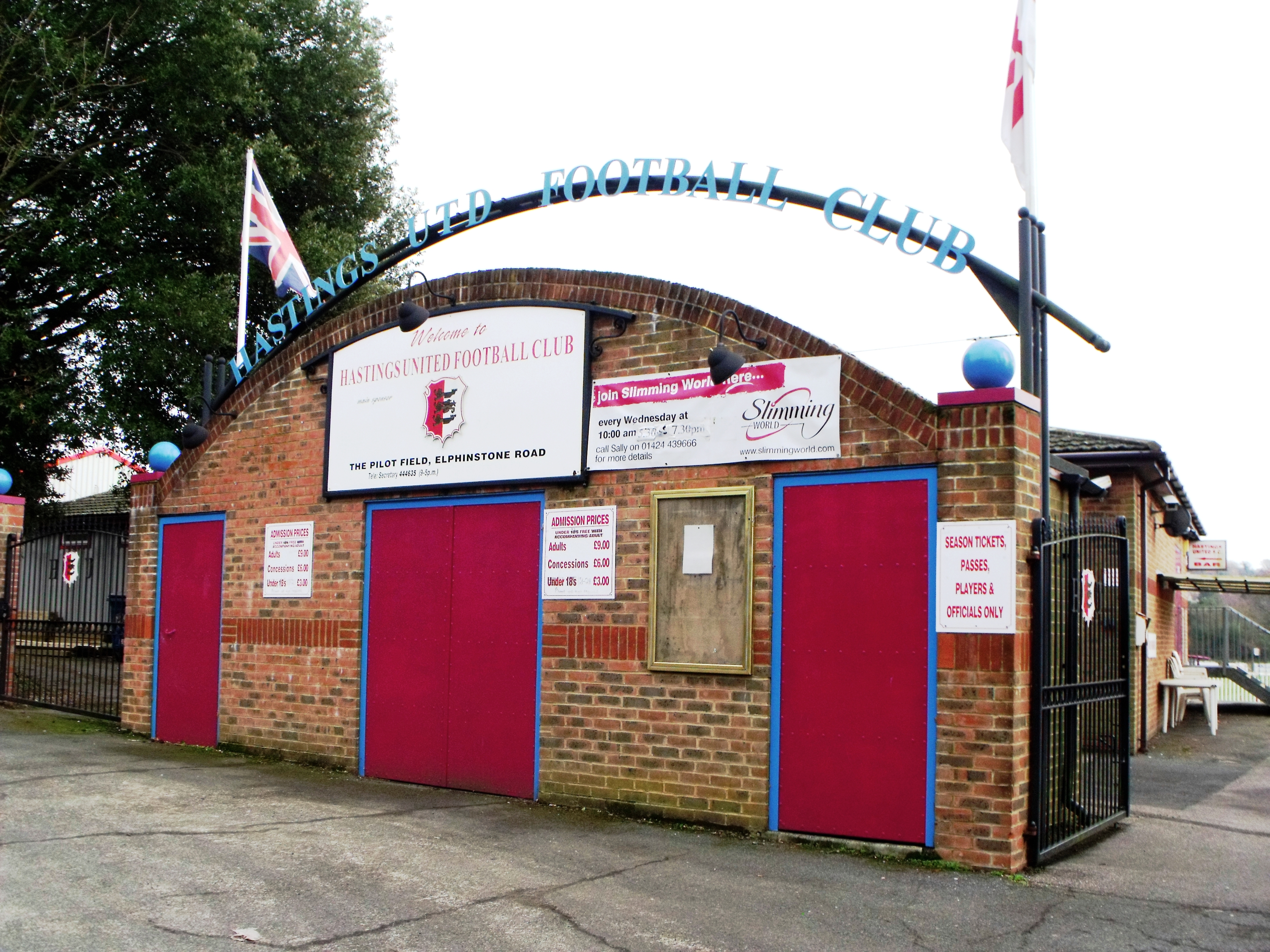
- Interactive map of The Pilot Field
- Full name: The Pilot Field
- Former names: The Firs Football Centre
- Location: Hastings, East Sussex
- Owner: Hastings Borough Council
- Operator: Hastings United FC
- Capacity: 4,050 (800 seats)
- Surface: Grass
- Field size: 110 x 75 yards

Construction
- Built: August 1920
- Opened: 8 November 1922

Tenants
- Hastings United (1920–1948) & (1985–); Hastings United (1948) (1948–1985); Hastings Saxons (1948–1949); Hastings & St Leonards Cycling Club (1920s)

The Pilot Field is a football stadium in Hastings, East Sussex. It is home to Hastings United men's and women's teams. The men's team currently play in the Isthmian League premier division, and the women's team currently play in the LSERFL division one south. The club have used the ground since 1985 after the old Hastings United folded, having previously used the ground between 1920 and 1948. The current capacity stands at 4,050 although over 9,000 have been known to attend events in the past and the closure of the grass bank has decreased the capacity.

== History ==
The site is first mentioned in 1560 as 'the Pilate Field', most likely a field used for growing pilled oats and where the area gets its name from. In 1886 the large sloping meadow was proposed as the new site for the Hastings Workhouse, however the proposal was met with opposition from local residents and landowners and the scheme was eventually dropped.

In 1920 the site was earmarked as a site of a potential new sports ground for the town alongside Horntye Park, with the Pilot Field being preferred as it could be ready to use for the 1920–21 football season. The site was acquired by the Hastings Corporation in June 1920, with the Hastings Sports Association taking control in August who did the necessary work needed on the ground for Rock-a-Nore FC to compete in the Sussex County League.

The first football match to take place was between Rock-a-Nore and Chichester, with the visitors winning in front of a crowd of at least 1,000. At first the site was simply a large slope with a football pitch fenced off, with the ground also being used for cricket and rugby. The site was split into two more level pitches (upper and lower), with a cycling track being constructed around the lower pitch. Despite already being in use for the two years the Pilot Field was officially opened on 8 November 1922, with a game between a Hastings representatives and Queens Park Rangers.

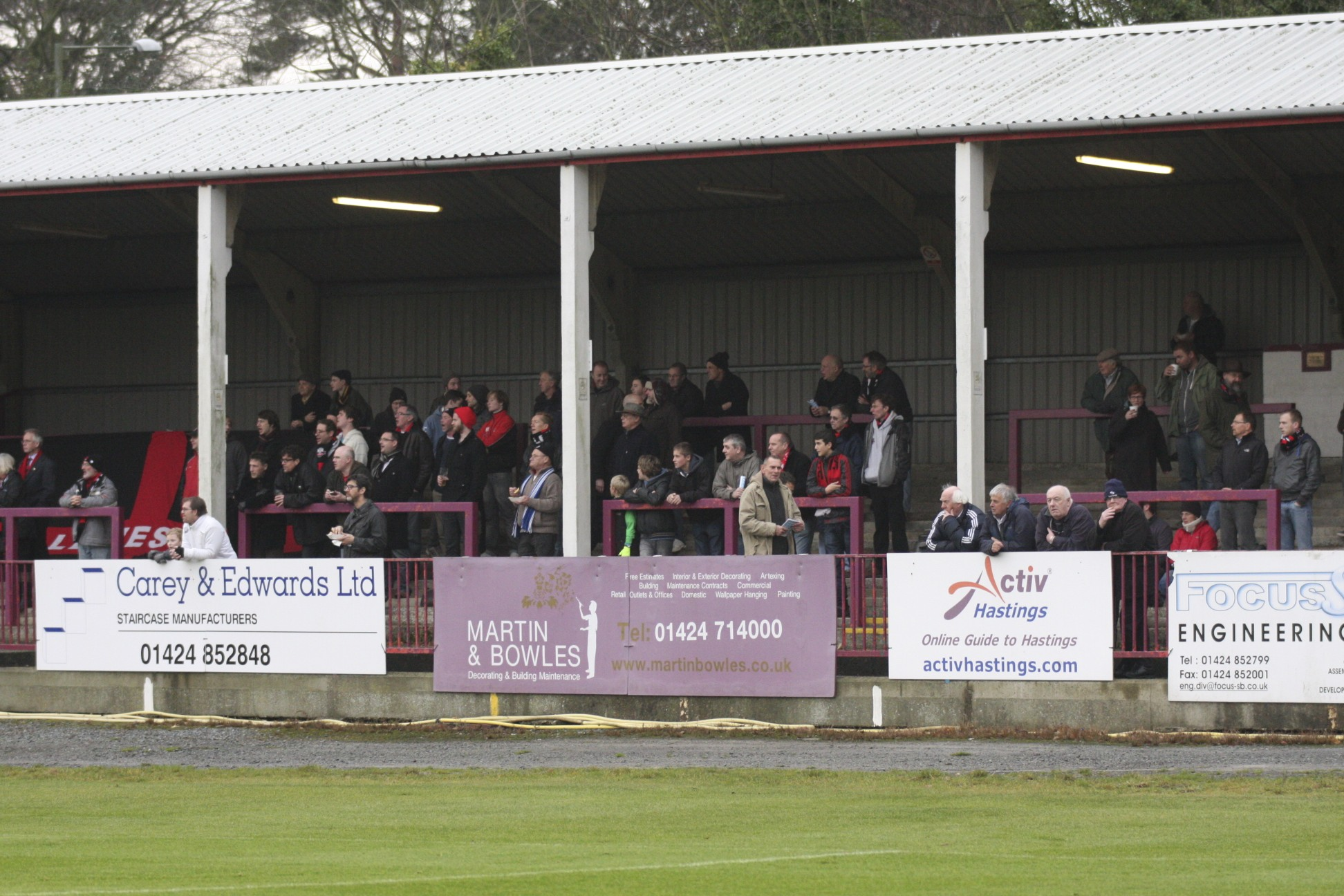
View the covered terrace at the Elphinstone Road end

In 1925 work on the main stand had started and was officially opened in April 1926, in an opening ceremony where 1,500 assembled in the structure. The cycling track was upgraded to cinder in 1948, in preparation for the Hastings Saxons speedway team moving into the ground. The same year saw the Hastings & St Leonards amateur club get kicked off in favour for the newly formed professional club Hastings United, who would stay at the ground until 1985.

The ground would see a number of improvements during Hastings United's tenure, including the erection of two new stands at the Elphinstone Road end of the ground in the mid 1950s and the erection of floodlights in 1964. The old speedway track was eventually concreted over to allow spectators to get closer to the playing area and for the erection of the dugouts in front of the main stand. A new squash complex constructed in the opposite corner to the main turnstiles was opened in 1980, but was later sold off to recuperate some of the debt owed by Hastings United.

In 1985 Hastings United folded and Hastings Town moved in from the old upper pitch, now called the Firs, with the ground receiving minor refurbishment work to represent the club colours of red and white. By the 1990s the two Elphinstone Road end stands were in poor condition, with the stand directly behind the goal receiving a major renovation in the mid 1990s whilst the other stand was closed to spectators, before eventually being demolished by 2000. A new clubhouse was built in 1998 and then further extended the following year, with the old clubhouse under the main stand becoming the boardroom. A new stand was built ahead of the 2005–06 season and was named the 'Cole Warren' stand after two supporters, this structure consists of a small number of rows of terracing and elevated viewing area for wheelchair users. In 2010 four new sets of floodlights replaced the old pylons which had been erected in 1964 and in 2016 the club purchased the old squash complex which was now a sports and social club.

== Structure and facilities ==
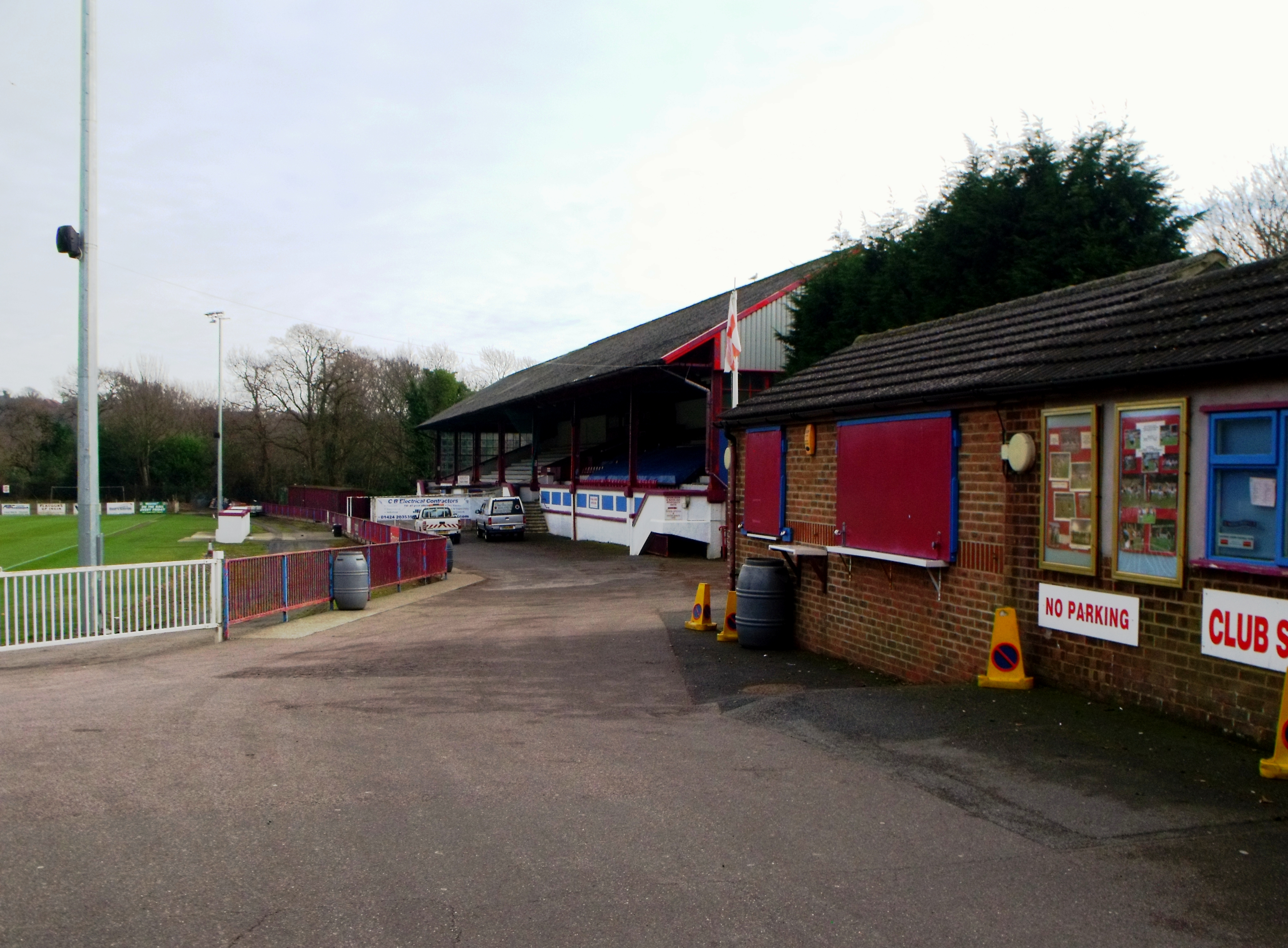
View of the south-west corner of the ground with the main stand in the background

The most prominent structure at the ground is the main stand, which covers about three quarters of the length of one side of the pitch. The capacity is 800 for seated spectators mostly on wooden benches, but there are plastic seats to the centre in front of the public address box, some of which are reserved for board members and other guests. There are more plastic seats located to the left of this block covering the front rows, which were relocated from the Firs after St Leonards folded in 2004. Underneath the main stand are the changing rooms, boardroom and a tea bar. The age of the main stand has led to ever increasing maintenance costs for the club and is a major factor in their effort to find a new stadium.

On the opposite side to the main stand is a grass bank, which at one point was open to spectators but was fenced off for health and safety. The closing off of the bank meant the capacity of ground went from 9,000 to 4,050. To the east of the bank, is the Hastings United Sports and Social Club, purchased in 2016, this building contains a gym, a bar and a viewing deck. The east side of the ground is where the Cole Warren stand is, behind the stand, the remains of the speedway track still exists and is used as a car park for players. On the west side of the ground, is the Elphinstone Road end terrace, with the clubhouse immediately to the south. In the south-west corner is a building that houses the club shop, toilets and a tea bar.

== Other uses ==
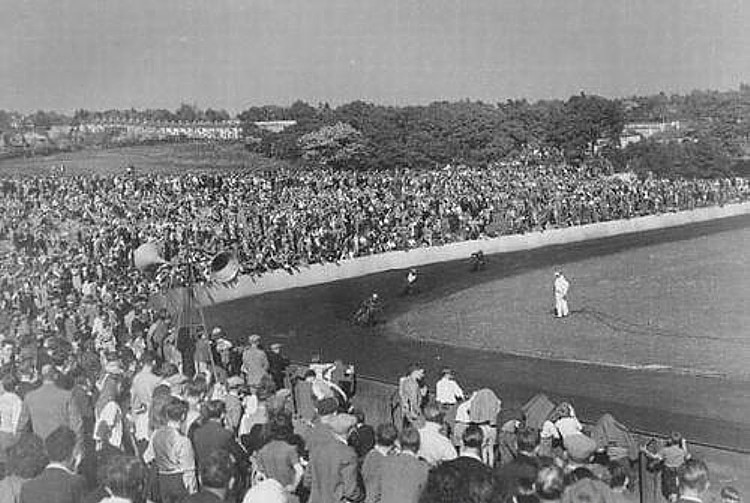
View of the Pilot Field hosting Speedway

When first opened the ground was intended to be used by various sports including football, rugby and hockey. There are no known records of hockey taking place at the Pilot Field, but there are records of rugby being played. Cricket was also played at the ground between 1920-1922 before being split into upper and lower pitches. The Hastings & St Leonards cycling club also made use of the cycling track built in 1922. The venue also hosted sports days and athletic events.

In 1948 the Hastings Saxons moved to the venue after Eastbourne Eagles were forced out of their stadium at Arlington due to a petrol ban, however the club left in 1949 following complaints about the noise from local residents. The speedway meets regularly attracted crowds of 9,000. It was proposed to introduce greyhound racing at the Pilot Field in 1939 and again in the 1966, but there are no records to show any races ever happening.

== Records ==
The known recorded record attendance for football at the Pilot Field is 12,527, when Hastings United drew 3-3 against Norwich City 1953–54 FA Cup third round tie. The record attendance a game featuring the newer Hastings United, is 4,888 in a friendly against Nottingham Forest when they were Hastings Town.

The Hastings Saxons regularly attracted crowds of 9,000 but it is unknown if they ever attracted a crowd larger than 12,527.

== Transport ==
The ground is located 1.1 miles away from Ore railway station, which is situated on the Marshlink line between Hastings and Ashford International. Hastings railway station is located 1.6 miles away and served by Southern and Southeastern. Situated on the Marshlink Line, East Coastway line to Brighton and the Hastings line to Tonbridge, this station has more frequent services.
