= Exeter Falcons =

British motorcycle speedway team

Club information
- Track address: County Ground Stadium (1947–2005)
- Country: England
- Founded: 1929
- Closed: 2005

Club facts
- Colours: Green and white

Major team honours
League champions	1974
Div 2 champions	2000
Div 3 champions	1948
Knockout Cup (Div 2)	1962, 1983
National Trophy (Div 3)	1951
Spring Gold Cup	1978
Young Shield	1997
Premier Trophy	2004

The Exeter Falcons were a speedway team based in the city of Exeter. The Falcons operated from 1947 to 2005 at the County Ground Stadium in Exeter.

== History ==
=== Origins & 1920s ===
Speedway began at the County Ground in 1929, when the Southern Speedways Ltd, led by Mr Seward Glanfield agreed a ten-year contract with the Devon Athletic Ground Company. The first meeting was held on 9 March 1929 but despite a full season of racing (which included an Exeter team racing challenge matches) the company went into liquidation.

=== 1930s ===
A second promotion called County Speedways Ltd, ran the speedway in 1930 and 1931 but also went into liquidation. In 1931 the Exeter team competed in the National Trophy during the 1931 Speedway Southern League season, losing to High Beech in the first round.

=== 1940s ===
At the start of 1947, plans began for the return of speedway to the County Ground and a lease was signed by Motor Sports (Exeter) Ltd (led by Frank Buckland) with the landlords County Athletic Ground Company. The Speedway Supporters Club persuaded the management to name the team the Falcons. The return was a success with excellent attendances and a fourth place finish in the 1947 Speedway National League Division Three. Cyril Roger was the stand out rider averaging 10.31.

The following season the Falcons signed Cyril's brother Bert Roger and Norman Clay and the additions were enough to help Exeter win the 1948 Speedway National League Division Three. The brothers left the Falcons after the 1948 season resulting in Exeter having a moderate 1949 season.

=== 1950s ===
In 1951, the Falcons signed the youngest Roger brother, Bob Roger, on loan from New Cross Rangers and with both Don Hardy and Goog Hoskin riding well, the team secured runner-up spot in the league and won the third tier National Trophy. During the 1950s many teams folded which resulted in Exeter participating in the Southern League from 1952 to 1953. The Falcons finished runner-up in 1953 behind Rayleigh Rockets, with Goog Hoskin topping the league averages and new Australian signing Jack Geran averaged 9.33. Despite signing another leading Australian rider Neil Street, the team went from 6th in 1954 to last in 1955. Changes to the league format in 1956 led to Bernard Slade and L.J. Hallett withdrawing Exeter from the league system. With the exception of sporadic challenge matches and open meetings during 1957 and 1958 there was limited speedway at the County Ground.

=== 1960s ===
After a couple of challenge meetings held throughout 1960 and a five year league absence, the team returned to league action in the 1961 Provincial Speedway League, under the promotion of Wally Mawdsley and Pete Lansdale. As a rider, Lansdale also topped the team's averages with 9.33 and was well supported by Len Silver.

The following year, the Falcons won the 1962 Provincial League Knockout Cup. The next two seasons were uneventful but both Alan Cowland and Jimmy Squibb rode well for the Falcons. In 1965, British speedway resolved ongoing issues by introducing the British League and the Falcons were founder members. In a tough league the team did well to finish 3rd during the 1968 British League season, largely due to the efforts of new signing Martin Ashby.

=== 1970s ===
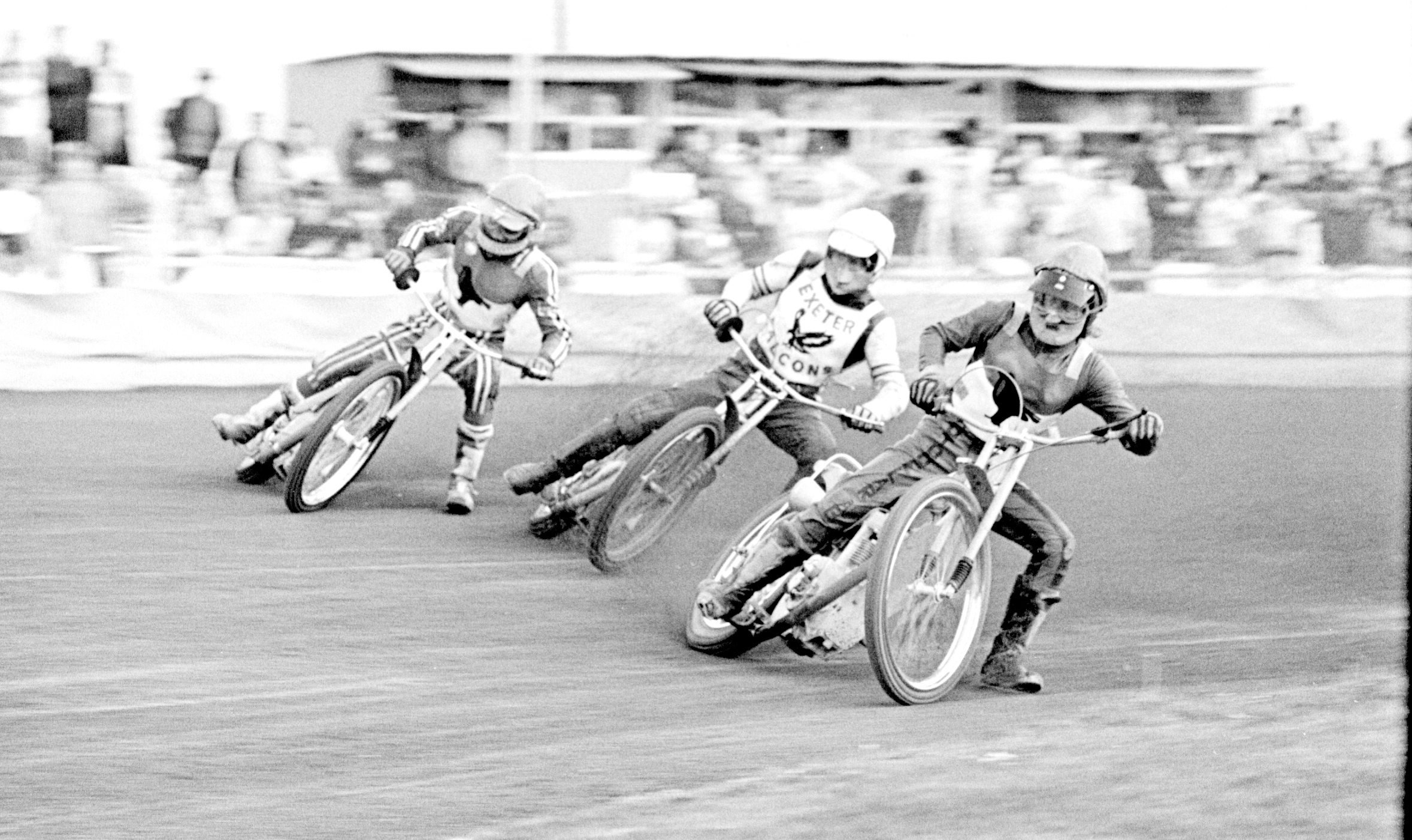
Exeter at Swindon, circa 1974

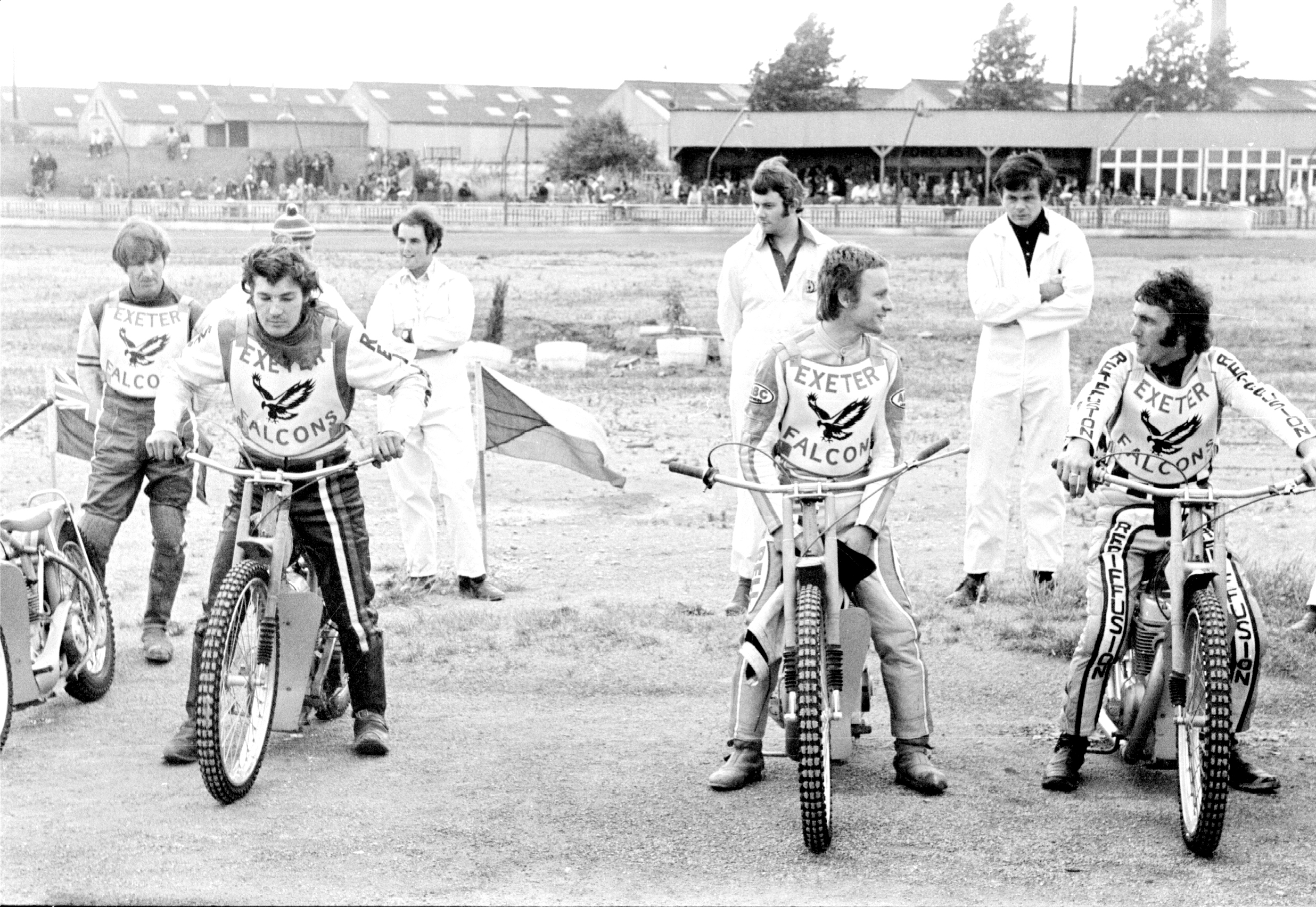
The 1975 Falcons at Cowley Stadium

The early part of the 1970s was at best average but that was about to change following the signing of New Zealander and multiple world champion Ivan Mauger during the 1973 British League season. Promoter Wally Mawdsley also signed 20-year-old American Scott Autrey and Tony Lomas. The team began to gel and with the help of existing riders such as Mike Sampson and Kevin Holden, the Falcons won the 1974 British League title.

Although the remainder of the decade saw Exeter compete near the top of the table, they were unable to repeat the success of 1974. In 1979, Autrey topped the league averages for Exeter.

=== 1980s ===
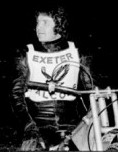
Tony Lomas

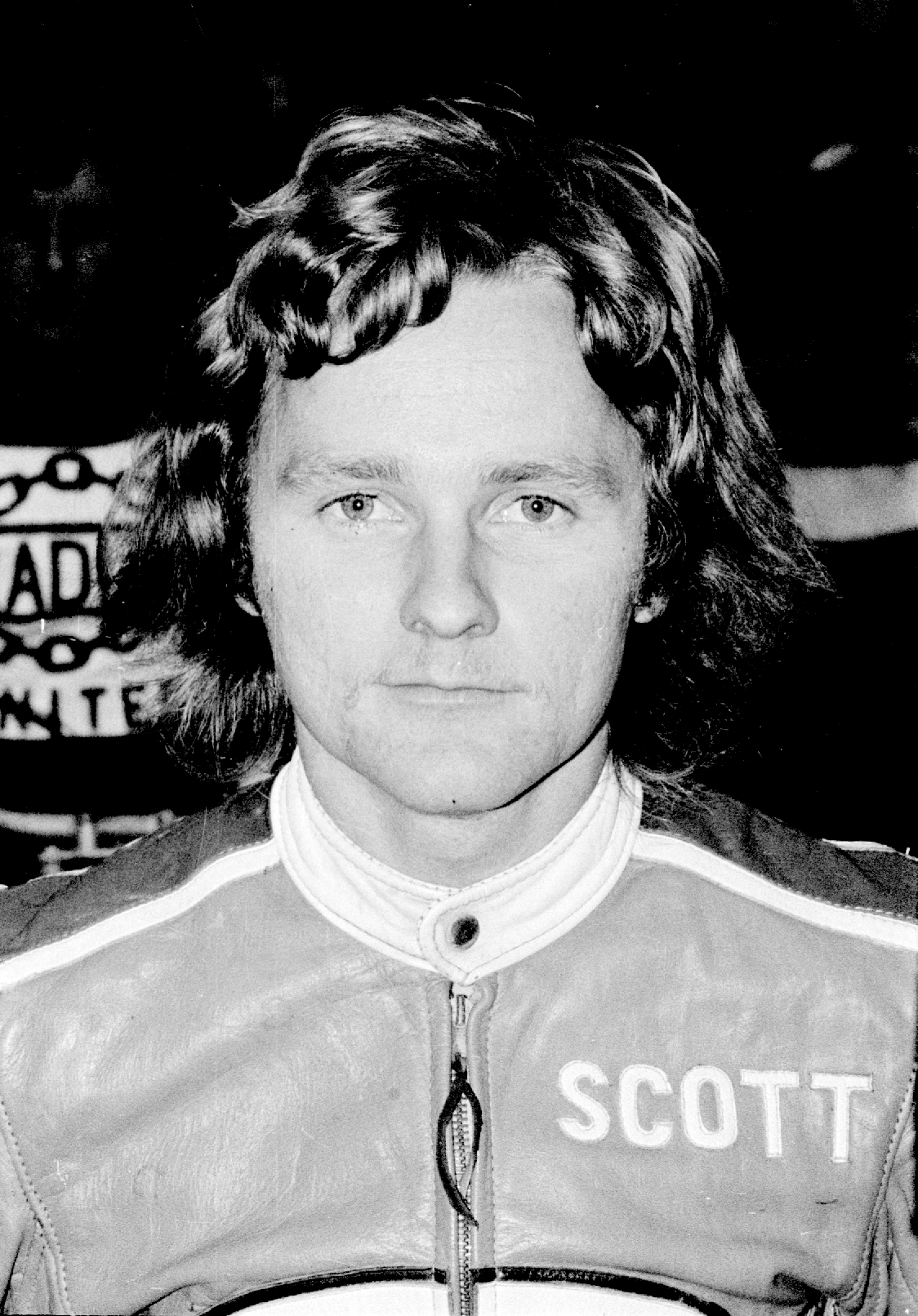
Scott Autrey

Exeter began the 1980s in the second tier of British speedway with the team entered for the 1980 National League season. Journalist Peter Oakes had also joined Mawdsley as a co-promoter at this stage.

The Falcons were surprise winners of the Knockout Cup during the 1983 National League season, following three seasons of uninspiring results. However, the following season the team moved back into the top league after Ivan Mauger returned to the club. Unfortunately Mauger was now 44 years-old and the team were outclassed, leading to a quick return to the second tier National League. The next five seasons saw the Falcons struggle badly with a slight improvement to 5th place in 1989 due in part to the form of Australian rider Steve Regeling.

=== 1990s ===
Regeling was superb in 1990, averaging 10.20 but he lacked support and left in 1992. By 1994, the Falcons under the promotion of Colin Hill, were propping up the league table. The merged Premier League was a bad experience for Falcons fans despite the opportunity of watching Mark Loram and Simon Wigg wear the Falcons jacket. Loram broke the 396 metres (433 yd) track record with a time of 64.3 seconds on 29 April 1996. In 1995 and 1996, the club also ran a junior side called the Devon Demons.

Three seasons of second tier speedway ensued and the Falcons fared much better, finishing in the top six from 1997 to 1999.

=== 2000s ===
The Falcons were not expected to challenge for the title during the 2000 Premier League speedway season but the number 1 rider Michael Coles found himself backed up by six other riders that averaged from 7.79 to 6.20. The consistency paid off, with the Falcons winning all their home games and pipping Swindon Robins to the title on points difference, after picking up all 13 bonus points that were available.

The Falcons raced for five more Premier League seasons before the club were forced to close at the end of 2005 after the stadium owners, Exeter Rugby Union club, sold the stadium to developers.

=== Since 2008 ===
Promoter Allen Trump received permission from Teignbridge council officials in 2008 to construct a new track at the Exeter Racecourse. The new track was expected to open for the start of the 2009 season, and Trump had applied to the British Speedway Promoters' Association for permission to enter a team for the 2009 Premier League but the plans fell through.

At a public meeting in July 2015, a month after the team participated in their first full meeting in a decade at the Oaktree Arena near Highbridge, the Exeter Falcons announced talks were underway about the development of a new track near Exeter but again plans failed to materialise.

In 2018, an Exeter team participated in the junior Southern Development League but were once again left without a home in 2021, following the demise of the Oaktree Arena.

== Notable riders ==
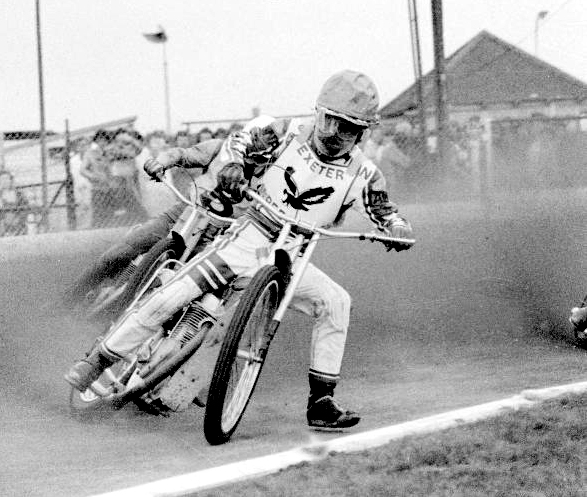
Ivan Mauger (a six-time world champion) in Exeter colours

- (England) Martin Ashby
- (United States) Scott Autrey
- (England) Nigel Boocock
- (Australia) Norman Clay
- (England) Bob Coles
- (England) Michael Coles
- (England) Colin Cook
- (New Zealand) Bruce Cribb
- (England) Alan Cowland
- (Australia) Jack Geran
- (England) Colin Gooddy
- (England) Richard Green
- (England) Don Hardy
- (England) Chris Harris
- (England) Kevin Holden
- (Czech Republic) Jan Holub I
- (England) Goog Hoskin
- (England) Chris Julian
- (England) Bob Kilby
- (England) Pete Lansdale
- (England) Tony Lomas
- (England) Mark Loram
- (New Zealand) Ivan Mauger
- (Australia) Steve Regeling
- (England) Bert Roger
- (England) Bob Roger
- (England) Cyril Roger
- (England) Alun Rossiter
- (England) Mike Sampson
- (New Zealand) Frank Shuter
- (England) Len Silver
- (England) Jimmy Squibb
- (Australia) Neil Street
- (Czech Republic) Václav Verner

== Season summary (1st team) ==
Extended content

Year and league	Position	Notes
1931 Speedway Southern League	n/a	competed in the National trophy only
1947 Speedway National League Division Three	4th	
1948 Speedway National League Division Three	1st	champions
1949 Speedway National League Division Three	7th	
1950 Speedway National League Division Three	7th	
1951 Speedway National League Division Three	2nd	National Trophy (Div 3)
1952 Speedway Southern League	5th	
1953 Speedway Southern League	2nd	
1954 Speedway National League Division Two	6th	
1955 Speedway National League Division Two	9th	
1961 Provincial Speedway League	8th	
1962 Provincial Speedway League	3rd	Provincial League Knockout Cup winners
1963 Provincial Speedway League	7th	
1964 Provincial Speedway League	6th	
1965 British League season	9th	
1966 British League season	10th	
1967 British League season	15th	
1968 British League season	3rd	
1969 British League season	12th	
1970 British League season	10th	
1971 British League season	15th	
1972 British League season	11th	
1973 British League season	8th	
1974 British League season	1st	champions
1975 British League season	4th	
1976 British League season	3rd	
1977 British League season	2nd	
1978 British League season	7th	
1979 British League season	5th	
1980 National League season	12th	
1981 National League season	7th	
1982 National League season	10th	
1983 National League season	10th	Div 2 Knockout Cup winners
1984 British League season	15th	
1985 National League season	12th	
1986 National League season	16th	
1987 National League season	14th	
1988 National League season	12th	
1989 National League season	5th	
1990 National League season	9th	
1991 British League Division Two season	7th	
1992 British League Division Two season	6th	
1993 British League Division Two season	10th	
1994 British League Division Two season	10th	
1995 Premier League speedway season	21st	
1996 Premier League speedway season	15th	
1997 Premier League speedway season	5th	
1998 Premier League speedway season	3rd	
1999 Premier League speedway season	6th	
2000 Premier League speedway season	1st	champions
2001 Premier League speedway season	7th	
2002 Premier League speedway season	10th	
2003 Premier League speedway season	13th	
2004 Premier League speedway season	10th	
2005 Premier League speedway season	9th	

== Season summary (juniors) ==
Extended content

Year and league	Position	Notes
1995 Academy League	7th	Devon Demons
1996 Speedway Conference League	2nd	Devon Demons
1997 Speedway Conference League	8th	Western Warriors (with Newport)
