= Jock Grierson =

British motorcycle speedway rider (1915 – 1973)

- Born: 17 May 1915; Maxwelltown, Scotland
- Died: 1973
- Nationality: British (Scottish)

Career history
- 1946: Birmingham Brummies
- 1947: Eastbourne Eagles
- 1948–1949: Hastings Saxons
- 1950–1952, 1954: Leicester Hunters
- 1953: Belle Vue Aces
- 1953: New Cross Rangers

Team honours
- 1947: League champion (tier 3)
- 1951: Midland Cup

John Grierson (17 May 1915 – 1973) was a motorcycle speedway rider from Scotland. During his speedway career he rode as Jock Grierson and earned one international cap for the Scotland national speedway team.

== Biography ==
Grierson, born in Maxwelltown, Scotland, became interested in Speedway after meeting Oddy Chipchase, the chief mechanic at Harringay speedway before beginning his British leagues career riding for Birmingham Brummies in the 1946 Speedway Northern League, although he only rode a three matches for the Midlands club that season.

The following season in 1947, Grierson joined Eastbourne Eagles in the third division and helped the team become the league champions. He and Wally Green formed a partnership at Eastbourne that became known as the 'Terrible Twins' due to the fact that nobody could beat the pair in a heat. Grierson modelled his racing style after Jack Parker. Despite winning the league with Eastbourne, he moved on and would ride for the Hastings Saxons from 1948 to 1949, recording averages of 9.75 and 9.06 respectively.

Grierson moved back to the Midlands in 1950, after signing for the Leicester Hunters. After three years with Leicester, he started the 1953 season with the New Cross Rangers but the club folded in June. He was forced to find new club and switched to Belle Vue Aces, finishing with a disappointing 3.87 average.

Grierson retired from speedway in 1953 but agreed to ride some matches for Leicester in 1954 as injury cover.

After emigrating to Australia at the end of 1954, Grierson settled in Adelaide. His protege Gerry Hussey travelled with him but would die in a racing crash in March 1959.

Grierson died of a heart attack in Australia in 1973.
