= Ken Middleditch =

British motorcycle speedway rider (1925–2021)

- Born: 5 October 1925; Camberley, England
- Died: 9 January 2021 (aged 95)
- Nationality: British (English)

Career history
- 1948–1949: Hastings Saxons
- 1950–1956, 1958, 1960–1962: Poole Pirates
- 1957: Swindon Robins

Individual honours
- 1951: Division Three Riders Champion
- 1954: Division Two Riders Champion

Team honours
- 1951: National League Div 3 Champion
- 1952, 1955: National League Div 2 Champion
- 1952, 1955: National Trophy (Div 2)
- 1957: National League Champion
- 1961: Provincial League Champion

Kenneth Arthur Middleditch (5 October 1925 – 9 January 2021) was a motorcycle speedway rider from England. He earned five international caps for the England national speedway team.

== Career ==
Middleditch served in the RAF in World War II as a rear gunner, and became interested in speedway while stationed in Egypt.

Middleditch signed for Third Division team Hastings in 1948 after progressing through Eastbourne's speedway training school. By 1949, he had become Hastings top points scorer but at the end of that year Hastings were forced to close down and he signed for Poole.

Middleditch had a successful career at Poole, forming an effective pairing with Poole rider Tony Lewis. He won the National League Division Three Rider's Championship, held at Penarth Road Stadium in Cardiff on 23 October 1951. He eventually became the team captain and won four league titles with the club. In 1954, he won the National League Division Two Rider's Championship, held at Hyde Road on 16 October.

Middleditch left Poole for the 1957 season when the club closed for a year and signed for Swindon. He returned to Poole for a further two stints before retiring in 1962.

== Family ==
Middleditch's son, Neil, also had a successful career as a speedway rider and has been team manager of the Poole Pirates since 1998.

After retiring from the sport, Middleditch set up a business, Middleditch Salvage, in Sturminster Marshall, Dorset. He died in January 2021 at the age of 95.
