= Hastings Saxons =

Former British speedway team

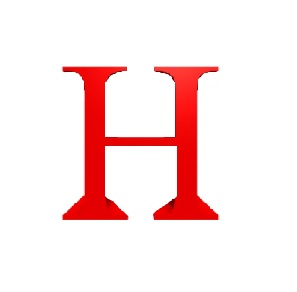

Club information
- Track address: The Pilot Field; Elphinstone Road; Hastings; East Sussex
- Country: England
- Founded: 1948
- Closed: 1949
- Team manager: Charles Dugard

Club facts
- Colours: Red and White
- Track size: 388 yards (355 m)
- Track record time: 71.0 seconds
- Track record date: 1948
- Track record holder: Wally Green

Hastings Saxons were a British motorcycle speedway team which operated for two years between 1948 and 1949 at the Pilot Field in Hastings.

== History ==
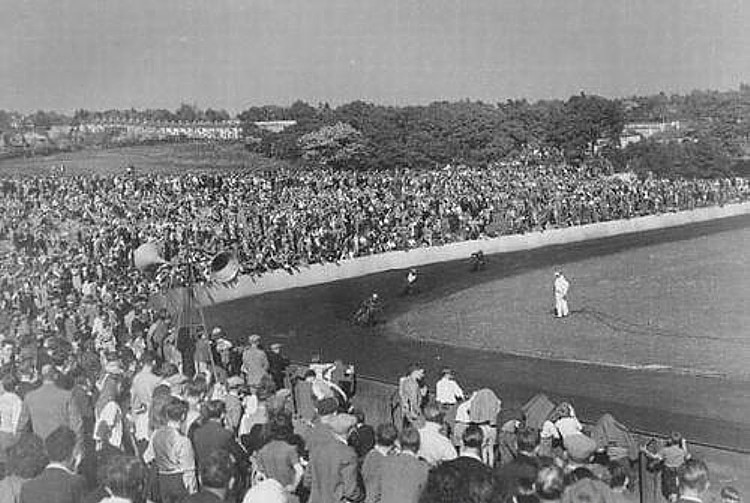
View of the Pilot Field hosting Speedway

At the end of 1947, the Eastbourne Eagles were forced to close down due to a petrol ban enforced at their Arlington Stadium. They decided to transfer their team to Hastings and at the beginning of 1948 the Speedway Control Board granted a licence to Hastings to stage speedway. They entered the National League Division Three under the management of ex-Wimbledon rider Charles Dugard. In their first meeting at their track at Pilot Field, approximately 5,000 people saw Hastings beat Stoke 44–39.

Hastings finished the 1948 league season in a mid table position in sixth place. They completed the 1949 season in a similar mid table position (8th). At the end of 1949, Hastings were forced to close after a group residents living near to the track took legal action to prevent further racing. The residents claimed that the noise from the speedway motorcycles was a public nuisance. An appeal by Hastings Speedways Ltd in January 1950 was unsuccessful.

The Pilot Field is still in use by football team Hastings United.

== Notable riders ==
- Jock Grierson
- Ken Middleditch
- Wally Green

== Season summary ==
Year and league	Position	Notes
1948 Speedway National League Division Three	6th	
1949 Speedway National League Division Three	8th	
