= Leicester Hunters =

British motorcycle speedway team

Club information
- Track address: The Stadium, Blackbird Road, Leicester
- Country: England
- Founded: 1948
- Closed: 1962
- League: National League/Provincial League

Club facts
- Colours: Hunting pink and gold
- Track size: 382 yards (1949), 364 yards (1950), 380 yards (1951-1962)

Major team honours
Midland Cup	1951

The Leicester Hunters were a motorcycle speedway team which operated from 1948 until 1962.

== History ==
Speedway had operated before the war at both Leicester Stadium and the Syston Sports Stadium. Speedway was proposed to return to Leicester in 1948 at Leicester Stadium, led by A. D. Sanderson with Roy Dook and later Bob Peett managing the team, but concerns from local residents over noise levels delayed the return until the following year, with the newly formed team limited to away challenge matches in 1948. To go with the team name, the riders wore hunting pink race bibs featuring a gold horseshoe. The Hunters joined the National League in Division 3, where they finished 10th. Former rider Cyril "Squib" Burton, who had been one of the top riders of the Leicester Stadium team in the early 1930s, took over as manager in 1950 and the team joined division 2 at the end of the season, after finishing in third place.

The team spent six seasons in division 2 and by 1957, the dwindling number of teams meant that the National League operated as a single division and the Hunters stayed in the top division until 1961, their best placing being as runners up in 1959. Mike Parker then took over the club, and opted to join the Provincial League in 1962, finishing in 12th position. This was to be the Hunters' final season, with the team transferring to Long Eaton for the 1963 season. Speedway returned to Leicester Stadium for a period but the team were renamed Leicester Lions.

== Season summary ==
Extended content

Year and league	Position	Notes
1949 Speedway National League Division Three	10th	
1950 Speedway National League Division Three	3rd	
1951 Speedway National League Division Two	2nd	
1952 Speedway National League Division Two	3rd	
1953 Speedway National League Division Two	8th	
1954 Speedway National League Division Two	4th	
1955 Speedway National League Division Two	7th	
1956 Speedway National League Division Two	6th	
1957 Speedway National League	5th	
1958 Speedway National League	4th	
1959 Speedway National League	2nd	
1960 Speedway National League	6th	
1961 Speedway National League	10th	
1962 Provincial Speedway League	12th	

== Notable riders ==
- Harry Bastable
- Ivor Brown
- Jack Geran
- Norman Hunter
- Ken McKinlay
- Paweł Waloszek
- Len Williams

== See also ==
- Speedway in Leicester
