= Yarmouth Bloaters =

Defunct British speedway team

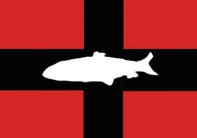

Club information
- Track address: Yarmouth Stadium, Caister-on-Sea, Norfolk
- Country: England
- Founded: 1948
- Closed: 1962

Club facts
- Colours: Red, Black and Silver
- Track size: 325 yards (297 m)
- Track record time: 69.2 seconds
- Track record date: 16 July 1957
- Track record holder: Peter Moore

The Yarmouth Bloaters were a motorcycle speedway team who operated from Yarmouth Stadium in Caister-on-Sea, near Great Yarmouth, from 1948 to 1962.

== History ==
In January 1948 the Speedway Control Board considered licence applications from 17 new tracks, one of which was from Yarmouth Stadium

The application was granted and the Yarmouth Bloaters speedway team was created and they joined the National League Division Three. The original plan was to use the name Yarmouth Mariners, but the name was disliked by supporters and the name "Bloaters" was chosen because of the town's connections with the fishing industry. It is also the nickname of the local football team, Great Yarmouth Town. The team's race jackets consisted of red and black quarters, which then became red with a black cross adorned with an image of a silver bloater. The team finished in 11th place in their inaugural league season.

In 1949 the Bloaters finished joint top of Division Three with the Hanley Potters, but the Potters' superior race points average meant that Yarmouth finished as runners up. Rider Billy Bales recorded an impressive 10.60 average during the season.

Yarmouth were offered promotion and moved up to the National League Division Two for the 1950 season, where they spent four seasons in Division Two, with the last in 1953 being the best as the team finished in third place.

Yarmouth wanted to open the 1954 season several weeks late, but this wish was denied by the Speedway Control Board and the Bloaters were not issued a racing licence for that year. The track remained closed until a consortium of local businessmen took over in 1957.

Yarmouth continued with a number of open meetings before competing in the 1959 Southern Area League and then becoming one of the founder members of the Provincial League in 1960. During the season the club lost money after several home meetings were cancelled due to bad weather, and they finished seventh out of ten teams. The decision was taken not to enter the Provincial League for the 1961 season by the promoters and after taking part in several open meetings the Bloaters closed due to financial problems. The stadium now hosts greyhound and stock car racing, and the speedway track has been covered over with tarmac.

== Season summary ==
Year and league	Position	Notes
1948 Speedway National League Division Three	11th	
1949 Speedway National League Division Three	2nd	lost the title on points difference
1950 Speedway National League Division Two	12th	
1951 Speedway National League Division Two	11th	
1952 Speedway National League Division Two	9th	
1953 Speedway National League Division Two	3rd	
1959 Southern Area League	2nd	
1960 Provincial Speedway League	7th	

== Notable riders ==
- Billy Bales
- Fred Brand
- Reg Reeves
