= Speedway National League Division Three =

UK motorcycle speedway league

- Sport: Speedway
- Founded: 1947
- Folded: 1951 replaced by the Southern League
- Country: England

The National League Division Three was the third division of Speedway in the United Kingdom. The league was created as a third tier of the National League in 1947 but ran for only five years. In 1952 it was replaced by the Southern League.

== Champions ==
Season	Champions	Second
1947	Eastbourne Eagles	Cradley Heath Cubs
1948	Exeter Falcons	Cradley Heath Cubs
1949	Hanley Potters	Yarmouth Bloaters
1950	Oxford Cheetahs	Poole Pirates
1951	Poole Pirates	Exeter Falcons

== See also ==
List of United Kingdom Speedway League Champions
