= 1960 Southern Area Riders' Championship =

British speedway competition

- Start date: 25 September 1960

The 1960 Southern Area Riders' Championship was the final edition of the Southern Area League Riders' Championship, which was a motorcycle speedway competition.

== History ==
From 1954 until 1959 the Southern Area League held a competition for its leading riders called the Southern Area League Riders' Championship. It was the second tier of speedway racing in the United Kingdom for Southern British teams.

However, in 1960, British speedway underwent a major revamp with the introduction of the 1960 Provincial Speedway League, which would act as the new second tier of speedway in Britain.

The five teams that previously formed the Southern League were forced to decide what direction they would take. Ipswich Witches joined the National League (the top division) and Yarmouth Bloaters joined the Provincial League. The remaining three teams Eastbourne Eagles, Aldershot Shots and Rye House Rockets were without a league, so they ran a series of challenge matches throughout 1960. The riders of the three teams competed in the Riders' Championship, which continued into 1960.

== Result ==
Ross Gilbertson won the Southern Area Riders' Championship. The final was held at Arlington Stadium on 25 September.

Pos.	Rider	Club	Pts
1	Ross Gilbertson	Eastbourne	15
2	Stan Stevens	Rye House	14
3	Ken Adams	Stoke	13
4	Eric Hockaday	Aldershot	12
5	John Dugard	Eastbourne	10
6	Tommy Sweetman	Rye House	9
7	Geoff Mudge	Poole	8
8	Jim Heard	Eastbourne	7
9	Bob Dugard	Eastbourne	6
10	Bill Osborne	Aldershot	5
11	Pete Sampson	Rye House	4
12	Clive Hitch	Rye House	4
13	Jimmy Gleed	Rye House	4
14	Colin Gooddy	Eastbourne	3
15	Dave Still	Eastbourne	3
16	John Edwards	Aldershot	3
17	Bob Warner (res)	Eastbourne	0
18	Geoff Pennikett (res)	Eastbourne	0

== See also ==
- List of United Kingdom Speedway League Riders' champions
- Southern Area League
