= 1960 Speedway National League =

British motorcycle speedway season

- League: National League
- No. of competitors: 10
- Champions: Wimbledon Dons
- National Trophy: Wimbledon Dons
- Britannia Shield: Belle Vue Aces
- Midland Cup: Coventry Bees
- Highest average: Ove Fundin
- Division/s below: 1960 Provincial League

The 1960 National League was the 26th season and the fifteenth post-war season of the highest tier of motorcycle speedway in Great Britain.

== Summary ==
The number of competitors increased from nine to ten with New Cross Rangers returning after a seven-year absence, Johnnie Hoskins persuaded Split Waterman and Eric Williams to come out of retirement and also signed was double world champion Barry Briggs.

Ipswich Witches returned after one year away replacing Poole Pirates who moved down to the newly formed Provincial League.

Wimbledon Dons won their sixth title in just seven years. The Dons also won the Knockout Cup, while Belle Vue claimed the Britannia Shield and Coventry were Midland Cup winners.

Derek 'Tink' Maynard of the Belle Vue Aces was fatally injured in a crash at The Firs Stadium, on 23 July 1960. Maynard was competing in the second leg of the National Trophy against Norwich when Slant Payling lost control of his bike and it hit Maynard. Both riders were taken to Norwich Hospital but Maynard died the following morning.

== League ==
=== Final table ===
Pos	Team	PL	W	D	L	Pts
1	Wimbledon Dons	17	13	0	4	26
2	Belle Vue Aces	18	11	1	6	23
3	Oxford Cheetahs	18	11	0	7	22
4	Ipswich Witches	18	10	0	8	20
5	Norwich Stars	17	8	1	8	17
6	Leicester Hunters	18	7	2	9	16
7	Southampton Saints	18	7	1	10	15
8	New Cross Rangers	18	7	1	10	15
9	Coventry Bees	18	7	0	11	14
10	Swindon Robins	18	5	0	13	10

=== Fixtures and results ===
Home \ Away	BV	COV	IPS	LEI	NC	NOR	OX	SOT	SWI	WIM
Belle Vue		51–39	61–29	61–29	57–33	54–35	47–43	55–34	51–39	44–46
Coventry	33–57		58–31	54–36	63–27	53–37	53–37	58–32	52–38	44–46
Ipswich	47–42	46–44		46–44	53–36	52–38	39–51	45–44	50–40	38–52
Leicester	40–49	50–40	50–40		41–49	56.5–33.5	57–33	48–42	52–38	53–37
New Cross	45–45	49–40	44–45	53–37		42–47	47–42	50–37	55–33	47–43
Norwich	46–44	52–38	56–34	45–45	61–29		55–35	47–43	56–34	n/a
Oxford	43–47	59–30	55–35	49–41	46–44	49–41		47–41	48–42	46–44
Southampton	50–40	49–41	44–46	45–45	55–35	60–30	41–46		60–30	50–40
Swindon	48–42	54–36	43–47	47–43	47–43	55–35	44–46	42–47		44–46
Wimbledon	47–43	56–34	61–28	64–26	48–42	56–34	49–41	49–41	54–36	

Legend: Blue = home team win; Yellow = draw; Red = away team win.

=== Top ten riders (league only) ===
	Rider	Nat	Team	C.M.A.
1	Ove Fundin	(Sweden)	Norwich	11.41
2	Peter Craven	(England)	Belle Vue	10.75
3	Ronnie Moore	(New Zealand)	Wimbledon	10.72
4	Björn Knutson	(Sweden)	Southampton	10.08
5	Arne Pander	(Denmark)	Oxford	10.06
6	Ken McKinlay	(Scotland)	Leicester	9.98
7	Barry Briggs	(New Zealand)	New Cross	9.93
8	Peter Moore	(Australia)	Ipswich	9.89
9	Ron Johnston	(New Zealand)	Belle Vue	9.88
10	Olle Nygren	(Sweden)	Southampton	9.40

== National Trophy ==
The 1960 National Trophy was the 22nd edition of the Knockout Cup. Wimbledon were the winners.

First round

Date	Team one	Score	Team two
17/05	Southampton	55-53	Oxford
12/05	Oxford	54-54	Southampton
06/05	Leicester	52-56	Ipswich
05/05	Ipswich	64-44	Leicester

Second round

Date	Team one	Score	Team two
29/06	New Cross	61-46	Norwich
27/06	Wimbledon	73-34	Coventry
25/06	Belle Vue	71-37	Ipswich
25/06	Coventry	54-54	Wimbledon
25/06	Norwich	67-41	New Cross
25/06	Swindon	66-42	Southampton
23/06	Ipswich	52-56	Belle Vue
21/06	Southampton	55-52	Swindon

Semifinals

Date	Team one	Score	Team two
25/07	Wimbledon	71-36	Swindon
23/07	Norwich	65-41	Belle Vue
16/07	Belle Vue	66-42	Norwich
16/07	Swindon	48-60	Wimbledon
17/08 replay	Norwich	61-47	Belle Vue
26/08 replay	Belle Vue	53-55	Norwich

=== Final ===
First leg

24 September 1960

Norwich Stars Ove Fundin 17 Aub Lawson 14 John Chamberlain 10 Dennis Newton 10 Reg Trott 5 Derek Strutt 3 Harry Edwards 3 Cyril Roger 0	62 – 46	Wimbledon Dons Ronnie Moore 12 Bob Andrews 10 Cyril Maidment 9 Gerry Jackson 6 Cyril Brine 4 Gil Goldfinch 3 Jim Tebby 2 Ernie Baker 0

The Firs Stadium

Second leg

3 October 1960

Wimbledon Dons Cyril Maidment 15 Bob Andrews 13 Gil Goldfinch 12 Cyril Brine 11 Gerry Jackson 9 Jim Tebby 7 Ronnie Moore 2 Ernie Baker 0	69 – 39	Norwich Stars Ove Fundin 18 John Chamberlain 5 Reg Trott 5 Dennis Newton 4 Harry Edwards 4 Cyril Roger 2 Derek Strutt 1 Billy Bales 0

Wimbledon Stadium

Wimbledon were National Trophy Champions, winning on aggregate 115–101.

== Britannia Shield ==
North

Team	PL	W	D	L	Pts
Belle Vue	8	8	0	0	16
Leicester	8	4	0	4	8
Coventry	7	3	0	4	6
Oxford	8	2	0	6	4
Ipswich	7	1	0	6	2

South

Team	PL	W	D	L	Pts
Wimbledon	8	7	0	1	14
Swindon	8	4	0	4	8
Norwich	8	4	0	4	8
Southampton	8	4	0	4	8
New Cross	8	1	0	7	2

North

Home \ Away	BV	COV	IPS	LEI	OX
Belle Vue		55–35	52–38	58–32	50–39
Coventry	43–47		61–29	56–34	61–28
Ipswich	41–49	43–47+		60–30	54–36
Leicester	44–46	55–35	52–38		54–36
Oxford	34–56	59–30	49–41	40–50	

Legend: Blue = home team win; Yellow = draw; Red = away team win.

South

Home \ Away	NC	NOR	SOT	SWI	WIM
New Cross		48–42	36–54	35–55	28–62
Norwich	65–25		57–33	47–42	47–43
Southampton	66–24	50–40		49–41	42–48
Swindon	62–28	54–35	53–37		41–49
Wimbledon	56–31	54–36	59–30	56–34	

Legend: Blue = home team win; Yellow = draw; Red = away team win.

+ match declared void

Final

Team one	Team two	Scores
Belle Vue	Wimbledon	56–34, 46–44

== Midland Cup ==
Coventry won the Midland Cup, which consisted of four teams.

First round

Team one	Team two	Score
Coventry	Swindon	58–31, 32–58
Oxford	Leicester	45–45, 36–54

=== Final ===
First leg

23 September 1960

Leicester Stefan Kwoczala 15 Ken McKinlay 14 Guy Allott 6 Charlie Barsby 4 Jack Geran 3 Bryan Elliott 2 Dave Hankins 2 Alf Hagon 2	48–41	Coventry Jack Young 10 Nigel Boocock 9 Henryk Zyto 9 Ron Mountford 5 Les Owen 4 Maury Mattingley 2 Jim Lightfoot 1 Nick Nicholls 1

Leicester Stadium

Second leg

24 September 1960

Coventry Henryk Zyto 9 Jack Young 9 Nigel Boocock 8 Jim Lightfoot 6 Maury Mattingley 6 Les Owen 6 Ron Mountford 4 Nick Nicholls 3	51–39	Leicester Stefan Kwoczala 15 Ken McKinlay 12 Guy Allott 8 Charlie Barsby 2 Dave Hankins 2 Alf Hagon 0 Jack Geran 0 Bryan Elliott 0

Brandon Stadium

Coventry won on aggregate 92–87

== Riders & final averages ==
Belle Vue

- (England) Peter Craven 10.75
- (New Zealand) Ron Johnston 9.88
- (New Zealand) Bob Duckworth 8.00
- (England) Dick Fisher 6.93
- (Sweden) Göte Nordin 6.67
- (England) Arthur Wright 6.35
- (England) Tink Maynard 4.92
- (England) Tony Robinson 4.38
- (England) Slant Payling 4.36
- (England) Jack Kitchen 4.00
- (England) Graham Coombes 3.90
- (New Zealand) Bryce Subritzky 3.53

Coventry

- (Australia) Jack Young 9.01
- (England) Nigel Boocock 8.31
- (Poland) Henryk Żyto 7.37
- (England) Les Owen 6.60
- (England) Ron Mountford 5.79
- (Australia) Graham Warren 5.63
- (England) Nick Nicholls 5.50
- (England) Jim Lightfoot 5.13
- (England) Maury Mattingley 4.18
- (England) Rick France 3.60

Ipswich

- (Australia) Peter Moore 9.89
- (Australia) Ray Cresp 6.86
- (Australia) Jack Biggs 6.67
- (England) Les McGillivray 6.00
- (England) Colin Gooddy 5.80
- (England) Jack Unstead 5.60
- (Sweden) Birger Forsberg 4.71
- (England) Jimmy Squibb 4.50
- (England) Len Silver 4.12

Leicester

- (Scotland) Ken McKinlay 9.98
- (Poland) Stefan Kwoczała 8.25
- (England) Bryan Elliott 6.15
- (England) Alf Hagon 5.97
- (Australia) Jack Geran 5.44
- (England) Dave Hankins 5.07
- (England) Guy Allott 4.78
- (England) Charlie Barsby 4.31
- (England) Harry Bastable 2.86

New Cross

- (New Zealand) Barry Briggs 9.93
- (Wales) Eric Williams 9.33
- (England) Split Waterman 7.32
- (Wales) Leo McAuliffe 6.08
- (England) Jimmy Gooch 4.96
- (England) Tommy Sweetman 3.74
- (England) Bobby Croombs 3.57
- (England) Derek Timms 3.43
- (Sweden) Arne Carlsson 3.00
- (England) Reg Luckhurst 2.93

Norwich

- (Sweden) Ove Fundin 11.41
- (Australia) Aub Lawson 7.28
- (England) Billy Bales 6.58
- (England) Cyril Roger 5.45
- (England) Reg Trott 5.33
- (Australia) Johnny Chamberlain 5.22
- (England) Dennis Newton 5.07
- (England) Derek Strutt 4.98
- (England) Harry Edwards 4.64
- (England) Clive Featherby 2.86
- (England) Terry Betts 0.00

Oxford

- (Denmark) Arne Pander 10.06
- (England) Ronnie Genz 8.41
- (Scotland) Gordon McGregor 7.95
- (Australia) Jack Biggs 7.32
- (England) Howdy Byford 5.53
- (England) Roy Bowers 5.05
- (England) Ken Adams 4.92
- (England) Eric Boothroyd 4.87
- (England) Colin Gooddy 4.67
- (England) Danny Dunton 4.59
- (England) Dave Still 2.44

Southampton

- (Sweden) Björn Knutson 10.08
- (Sweden) Olle Nygren 9.40
- (England) Brian Crutcher 8.71
- (Australia) Chum Taylor 8.00
- (England) Dick Bradley 6.61
- (England) Brian Hanham 6.00
- (England) Alby Golden 5.75
- (Scotland) Ross Gilbertson 5.75
- (Netherlands) Peter Vandenberg 3.91
- (Australia) Jack Scott 3.53
- (England) Brian Brett 0.62
- (Sweden) Alf Jonsson injured after 2 matches

Swindon

- (England) Mike Broadbank 8.33
- (England) George White 8.00
- (Wales) Ian Williams 6.92
- (Australia) Neil Street 6.85
- (Poland) Tadeusz Teodorowicz 6.74
- (Australia) John Board 4.68
- (England) Brian Meredith 4.19
- (England) Ron Taylor 3.60
- (England) Brian Brett 2.45

Wimbledon

- (New Zealand) Ronnie Moore 10.72
- (England) Ron How 9.36
- (England) Bob Andrews 8.17
- (England) Gerald Jackson 6.84
- (England) Cyril Maidment 6.59
- (England) Cyril Brine 6.35
- (England) Gil Goldfinch 5.84
- (England) Ernie Baker 2.89
- (England) Jim Tebby 3.93

== See also ==
- List of United Kingdom Speedway League Champions
- Knockout Cup (speedway)
