= 1957 Southern Area League =

British motorcycle speedway season

- League: Southern Area League
- No. of competitors: 4
- Champions: Rayleigh II/Southern Rovers
- Riders' Championship: Leo McAuliffe
- Division/s above: National League

The 1957 Southern Area League was the fourth season of the Southern Area League but the first as the regional second tier of speedway racing in the United Kingdom for Southern British teams.

== Summary ==
California Poppies were no longer competitors with the promotion and nickname moving to Aldershot. The Southern Rovers team who had been without a track in the previous season had found a new home at Rayleigh and were also referred to as Rayleigh II.

Southern Rovers were the champions.

== Final table ==
Pos	Team	PL	W	D	L	Pts
1	Rayleigh II/Southern Rovers	12	8	0	4	16
2	Eastbourne Eagles	12	6	0	6	12
3	Rye House Roosters	12	5	0	7	10
4	Aldershot Poppies	12	5	0	7	10

== Fixtures & results ==
=== A fixtures ===
Home \ Away	ALD	EAS	RYE	SR
Aldershot		42–41	51–32	49–35
Eastbourne	52–31		51–32	35–48
Rye House	52–29	66–17		40–42
Southern Rovers/Rayleigh II	50–34	46–37	58–26	

Legend: Blue = home team win; Yellow = draw; Red = away team win.

=== B fixtures ===
Home \ Away	ALD	EAS	RYE	SR
Aldershot		36–48	59–23	57–27
Eastbourne	52–31		46–36	39–45
Rye House	48–35	36–46		51–32
Southern Rovers/Rayleigh II	54–29	45–39	32–51	

Legend: Blue = home team win; Yellow = draw; Red = away team win.

== Leading Averages ==
	Rider	Team	C.M.A.
1	Gerry King	Rye House	10.30
2	Jim Heard	Eastbourne	10.27
3	Frank Bettis	Eastbourne	9.50
4	Colin Gooddy	Rayleigh/Southern Rovers	9.33
5	Ross Gilbertson	Aldershot	9.30

== Riders' Championship ==
Leo McAuliffe won the Riders' Championship for the second successive season. The final was held at Arlington Stadium on 29 September. Remarkably McAuliffe and Maury Conway dead heated in the run off to decide the champion after both riders finished on 13 points. A second run off was required in which McAuliffe won by a wheel. The winning trophy was presented by Barry Briggs.

Pos.	Rider	Club	Pts
1	Leo McAuliffe	Rayleigh/Southern Rovers	13+3
2	Maury Conway	Eastbourne	13+2
3	Jim Heard	Eastbourne	12
4	Ross Gilbertson	Aldershot	11
5	Noel Conway	Eastbourne	10
6	Pat Flanagan	Aldershot	9
7	Ron Walton	Aldershot	8
8	Tommy Sweetman	Rayleigh/Southern Rovers	8
9	Bobby Croombs	Rye House	8
10	Bryan Meredith	Rayleigh/Southern Rovers	6
11	Alan Brett	Rye House	5
12	Ronnie Rolfe	Rye House	5
13	Alan Lunn	Rye House	4
14	Dave Still	Rye House	4
15	Pete Mould	Aldershot	3
16	Les Searle (res)	Eastbourne	1
17	Dave Slater (res)	Rye House	1

== Riders & final averages ==
Aldershot

- Ross Gilbertson 8.57
- Ron Walton 8.30
- Pete Mold 8.00
- Jimmy Gleed 7.00
- Pat Flanagan 6.86
- Ron Webb 5.91
- Phil Sheppard 5.50
- John Day 5.45
- Ted Spittles 3.20

Eastbourne

- Frank Bettis 10.67
- Jimmy Heard 7.00
- Leo McAuliffe 6.00
- Reg Davies 5.71
- Dave Collett 5.60
- John Dugard 4.00
- Jim Preddy 1.67
- Les Searle 1.33
- Bob Warner 1.00

Rye House

- Gerry King 10.75
- Bobby Croombs 10.00
- Dave Still 8.33
- Jim Chalkley 7.20
- Dave Slater 4.60
- Alan Lunn 4.33
- Ronnie Rolfe 3.64
- Brian Brett 3.29
- Ernie Baker 3.20
- Ivan Mauger 2.22
- Colin Pratt 1.33

Rayleigh II/Southern Rovers

- Colin Gooddy 9.00
- Leo McAuliffe 9.00
- Stan Clark 8.46
- Vic Hall 8.40
- Brian Meredith 7.50
- Tommy Sweetman 7.17
- Eric Ebbs 7.45
- Eric Eadon 5.00
- Alan Pearce 5.00
- Mike Lawrence 5.00
- Pat McKenzie 4.80
- Neil Roberts 4.00
- Tony Eadon 1.60

== See also ==
- List of United Kingdom Speedway League Champions
- Knockout Cup (speedway)
