= 1959 Speedway National League =

British motorcycle speedway season

- League: National League
- No. of competitors: 9
- Champions: Wimbledon Dons
- National Trophy: Wimbledon Dons
- Britannia Shield: Wimbledon Dons
- Highest average: Ove Fundin
- Division/s below: 1959 Southern Area League

The 1959 National League was the 25th season and the fourteenth post-war season of the highest tier of motorcycle speedway in Great Britain.

== Summary ==
With Ipswich Witches dropping down to the Southern Area League, only 9 teams competed with Wimbledon Dons continuing their domination of British speedway with their fifth title in six years.

== League ==
=== Final table ===
Pos	Team	PL	W	D	L	Pts
1	Wimbledon Dons	16	13	0	3	26
2	Leicester Hunters	16	8	1	7	17
3	Coventry Bees	16	8	1	7	17
4	Norwich Stars	16	8	0	8	16
5	Southampton Saints	16	8	0	8	16
6	Poole Pirates	16	8	0	8	16
7	Oxford Cheetahs	16	7	0	9	14
8	Swindon Robins	16	6	0	10	12
9	Belle Vue Aces	16	5	0	11	10

=== Fixtures and results ===
Home \ Away	BV	COV	LEI	NOR	OX	PP	SOT	SWI	WIM
Belle Vue		55–35	50–39	44–46	44–46	65–43	69–38	51–57	52–56
Coventry	51–39		45–45	64–44	51–39	69–39	48–42	51–39	43–47
Leicester	50–40	57–33		66–42	45–43	60–30	43–47	46–44	49–41
Norwich	47–43	60–30	62–46		65–42	54–36	72–36	48–42	44–46
Oxford	62–28	61–29	49–41	58–49		44–45	49–41	52–38	34–56
Poole	48–60	60–48	58–50	63–27	52–38		53–37	46–44	47–43
Southampton	59–31	53–54	50–58	47–43	74–34	58–32		54–36	41–49
Swindon	51–39	50–58	59–31	49–41	45–44	63–27	43–47		39–68
Wimbledon	65–25	67–41	75–33	50–40	70–38	53–37	44–45	63–27	

Legend: Blue = home team win; Yellow = draw; Red = away team win.

== Top ten riders (league only) ==
	Rider	Nat	Team	C.M.A.
1	Ove Fundin	(Sweden)	Norwich	11.00
2	Peter Craven	(England)	Belle Vue	10.84
3	Ken McKinlay	(Scotland)	Leicester	10.75
4	Brian Crutcher	(England)	Southampton	10.65
5	Ronnie Moore	(New Zealand)	Wimbledon	10.52
6	Peter Moore	(Australia)	Wimbledon	10.08
7	Ron How	(England)	Wimbledon	9.92
8	Mike Broadbank	(England)	Swindon	9.40
9	Ron Johnston	(New Zealand)	Belle Vue	9.05
10	Arne Pander	(Denmark)	Oxford	8.90

== National Trophy ==
The 1959 National Trophy was the 21st edition of the Knockout Cup. Wimbledon were the winners.

First round

Date	Team one	Score	Team two
30/05	Swindon	55-52	Oxford
28/05	Oxford	59-49	Swindon

Second round

Date	Team one	Score	Team two
16/07	Oxford	57-51	Southampton
14/07	Southampton	61-47	Oxford
27/06	Belle Vue	67-41	Leicester
27/06	Coventry	69-39	Wimbledon
26/06	Leicester	59-49	Belle Vue
22/06	Wimbledon	71-37	Coventry
20/06	Norwich	65-43	Poole
19/06	Poole	46-62	Norwich

Semifinals

Date	Team one	Score	Team two
08/08	Norwich	53-55	Southampton
04/08	Southampton	73-35	Norwich
03/08	Wimbledon	75-33	Belle Vue
01/08	Belle Vue	54-54	Wimbledon

=== Final ===
First leg

14 September 1959

Wimbledon Dons Barry Briggs 18 Ronnie Moore 13 Bob Andrews 12 Ron How 11 Jim Tebby 8 Cyril Maidment 4 Cyril Brine 2 Gil Goldfinch 0	67 – 41	Southampton Saints Geoff Mardon 11 Brian Crutcher 9 Björn Knutson 7 Alby Golden 5 Chum Taylor 4 Jack Scott 2 Brian Hanham 1 Dick Bradley 0

Wimbledon Stadium

Second leg

15 September 1959

Southampton Saints Geoff Mardon 11 Björn Knutson 9 Chum Taylor 8 Alby Golden 8 Brian Brett 8 Brian Crutcher 4 Dick Bradley 2 Brian Hanham 2	52 – 56	Wimbledon Dons Barry Briggs 17 Ron How 16 Ronnie Moore 10 Bob Andrews 6 Gil Goldfinch 3 Jim Tebby 3 Cyril Brine 1 Cyril Maidment 0

Banister Court Stadium

Wimbledon were National Trophy Champions, winning on aggregate 123–93.

== Britannia Shield ==
South

Team	PL	W	D	L	Pts
Wimbledon	8	6	0	2	12
Southampton	8	5	0	3	10
Norwich	8	4	1	3	9
Swindon	8	2	1	5	5
Poole	8	2	0	6	4

North

Team	PL	W	D	L	Pts
Belle Vue	6	4	0	2	8
Coventry	6	4	0	2	8
Leicester	6	2	0	4	4
Oxford	6	2	0	4	4

Home \ Away	NOR	PP	SOT	SWI	WIM
Norwich		52–38	57–33	69–21	54–36
Poole	48–42		43–47	38–52	43–47
Southampton	60–30	54–36		50–40	48–42
Swindon	45–45	42–48	46–43		44–46
Wimbledon	59–31	57–33	60–30	53–37	

Legend: Blue = home team win; Yellow = draw; Red = away team win.

Home \ Away	BV	COV	LEI	OX
Belle Vue		57–33	58–32	51–39
Coventry	35–53		49–41	52–38
Leicester	46–44	44–46		62–28
Oxford	51–39	41–49	47–43	

Legend: Blue = home team win; Yellow = draw; Red = away team win.

Final

Team one	Team two	Scores
Wimbledon	Belle Vue	59–31, 56–34

== Riders and final averages ==
Belle Vue

- (England) Peter Craven 10.84
- (New Zealand) Ron Johnston 9.05
- (New Zealand) Bob Duckworth 7.24
- (England) Dick Fisher 6.57
- (England) Peter Williams 5.54
- (England) Arthur Wright 5.33
- (England) Slant Payling 4.21
- (England) Tink Maynard 3.64
- (England) Jack Kitchen 3.00
- (England) Danny Dunton 2.73
- (England) Graham Beattie 2.50
- (England) Tony Robinson 1.20
- (England) Graham Coombes 0.29

Coventry

- (England) Nigel Boocock 8.65
- (England) Ron Mountford 7.61
- (England) Arthur Forrest 7.28
- (England) Nick Nicholls 5.51
- (England) Maury Mattingley 5.44
- (England) Brian Meredith 5.33
- (England) Jim Lightfoot 4.98
- (England) Les Owen 4.94
- (Finland) Antti Pajari 4.32
- (Australia) Graham Warren 2.00

Leicester

- (Scotland) Ken McKinlay 10.75
- (Australia) Jack Geran 8.50
- (Poland) Marian Kaiser 7.80
- (England) Eric Boothroyd 5.95
- (England) Charlie Barsby 4.10
- (England) Bryan Elliott 4.00
- (England) Guy Allott 3.80
- (England) Alf Hagon 3.70
- (England) Harry Bastable 2.67
- (England) Dave Hankins 2.10

Norwich

- (Sweden) Ove Fundin 11.00
- (Australia) Aub Lawson 8.56
- (England) Billy Bales 7.78
- (England) Cyril Roger 6.25
- (England) Reg Trott 5.76
- (England) Phil Clarke 5.63
- (Australia) Johnny Chamberlain 5.58
- (England) Derek Strutt 4.55
- (England) Harry Edwards 4.76
- (England) Clive Featherby 4.00

Oxford

- (Denmark) Arne Pander 8.90
- (Scotland) Gordon McGregor 8.32
- (England) Ronnie Genz 7.07
- (England) Nick Nicholls 7.00
- (England) Roy Bowers 5.96
- (England) Arthur Wright 5.70
- (England) Ken Adams 5.37
- (England) Colin Gooddy 5.02
- (England) Howdy Byford 3.52
- (England) Dave Still 0.00

Poole

- (Australia) Ray Cresp 7.37
- (England) Les McGillivray 7.14
- (England) Jack Unstead 7.08
- (Sweden) Birger Forsberg 6.85
- (Australia) Jack Biggs 6.34
- (England) Jimmy Squibb 5.70
- (South Africa) Trevor Blokdyk 4.88
- (England) Reg Duval 4.50
- (England) Terry Small 4.34
- (England) Norman Strachan 3.73

Southampton

- (England) Brian Crutcher 10.65
- (New Zealand) Geoff Mardon 8.73
- (Sweden) Björn Knutson 8.40
- (England) Jimmy Squibb 6.67
- (Australia) Chum Taylor 6.22
- (England) Dick Bradley 6.22
- (England) Alby Golden 5.33
- (Australia) Jack Scott 4.86
- (England) Johnny Hole 5.70
- (England) Brian Hanham 4.09
- (England) Brian Brett 4.85

Swindon

- (England) Mike Broadbank 9.40
- (England) George White 7.89
- (Wales) Ian Williams 7.22
- (Poland) Tadeusz Teodorowicz 6.58
- (Australia) Neil Street 6.57
- (New Zealand) Trevor Redmond 3.71
- (Australia) John Board 3.60
- (England) Glyn Chandler 2.18
- (England) Ray Harris 1.56
- (England) Roy Moreton 0.94
- (Wales) Leo McAuliffe 0.00

Wimbledon

- (New Zealand) Ronnie Moore 10.52
- (Australia) Peter Moore 10.40
- (England) Ron How 9.92
- (New Zealand) Barry Briggs 8.80
- (England) Gerald Jackson 7.14
- (England) Jim Tebby 6.55
- (England) Bob Andrews 6.49
- (England) Cyril Maidment 6.35
- (England) Gerry King 5.00
- (England) Cyril Brine 4.07

== See also ==
- List of United Kingdom Speedway League Champions
- Knockout Cup (speedway)
