= 1955 Southern Area League =

Speedway racing season in the UK

- League: Southern Area League
- No. of competitors: 4
- Champions: Rye House Roosters
- Riders' Champion: Mike Broadbank
- Highest average: Vic Hall
- Division/s above: National League Div 1 National League Div 2

The 1955 Southern Area League was the second season of the regional third tier of speedway racing in the United Kingdom for Southern British teams. The season started with the same five teams that finished the previous season.

Rye House Roosters were the champions. Vic Hall of Brafield topped the averages.

Ringwood Turfs withdrew mid-season.

== Final table ==
Pos	Team	PL	W	D	L	Pts
1	Rye House Roosters	12	10	0	2	20
2	California Poppies	12	7	0	5	14
3	Brafield Flying Foxes	12	6	0	6	12
4	Eastbourne Eagles	12	1	0	11	2

Withdrawal (Record expunged) : Ringwood Turfs

== Fixtures & results ==
=== A fixtures ===
Home \ Away	BFF	CAL	EAS	RIN	RYE
Brafield		49–34	61–23	50–30	40–44
California	52–32		53–30	53–30	50–33
Eastbourne	49–33	23–61		39–43	33–47
Ringwood	n/a	37–47	55–27		n/a
Rye House	55–27	47–36	67–17	57–24	

Legend: Blue = home team win; Yellow = draw; Red = away team win.

=== B fixtures ===
Home \ Away	BFF	CAL	EAS	RIN	RYE
Brafield		57–27	48–36	51–32	55–29
California	49–34		56–27	n/a	38–45
Eastbourne	36–48	31–53		n/a	36–47
Ringwood	n/a	n/a	n/a		n/a
Rye House	44–40	62–22	61–22	61–22	

Legend: Blue = home team win; Yellow = draw; Red = away team win.

== Leading Averages ==
	Rider	Team	C.M.A.
1	Vic Hall	Brafield	9.90
2	Mike Broadbank	Rye House	9.67
3	Brian Meredith	Brafield	9.36
4	Vic Ridgeon	Rye House	9.17
5	Al Sparrey	Rye House	8.95

== Riders' Championship ==
Mike Broadbank won the Riders' Championship. The final was held at Rye House Stadium on 25 September.

Pos.	Rider	Club	Pts
1	Mike Broadbank	Rye House	15
2	Vic Ridgeon	Rye House	12
3	Ron Sharp	California	11
4	Merv Hannam	Eastbourne	10
5	Dave Slater	Rye House	10
6	Gil Goldfinch	California	9
7	Tom Reader	Eastbourne	9
8	Eric Hockaday	California	7
9	Bryan Meredith	Brafield	6
10	Jimmy Heard	Rye House	6
11	Tommy Sweetman	California	5
12	Colin Gooddy	Brafield	5
13	Pete Mould	California	5
14	Stan Bedford	Rye House	3
15	Ross Gilbertson	California	2
16	Bob Anderson	California	0

== Riders & final averages ==
Brafield

- Vic Hall 9.89
- Brian Meredith 9.33
- Frank Greasley 8.20
- Alan Pearce 7.60
- Dave Hankins 5.89
- Colin Gooddy 5.87
- Brian Miller 5.60
- Hank Bird 5.60
- Neil Roberts 5.18

California

- Bob Andrews 7.76
- Jimmy Gleed 7.73
- Pete Mold 7.65
- Gil Goldfinch 7.43
- Tommy Sweetman 7.00
- Eric Hockaday 6.97
- Ross Gilbertson 6.75
- Ron Sharp 6.19
- Bob Anderson 2.00

Eastbourne

- Merv Hannam 8.92
- Wally Wilson 5.88
- Jim Preddy 4.42
- Bert Little 4.42
- Gerry Bridson 4.00
- Bob Bunney 3.66
- George Smithson 3.56
- Dave Collett 3.43
- Dave Freeborn 2.00

Ringwood (withdrew)

- Merv Hannam 7.20
- Gerry Bridson 5.26
- Tom Reader 5.17
- Glyn Chandler 4.91
- Gordon Richards 4.31
- Mike Tamms 4.00
- George Hutchinson 2.55

Rye House

- Mike Broadbank 9.75
- Vic Ridgeon 9.25
- Al Sparrey 9.05
- Jimmy Heard 8.25
- Dave Slater 7.41
- Stan Bedford 7.35
- Geoff Woodger 6.89
- Bill Simpson 6.55
- Vernon Brown 4.24
- Gerry King 2.93

== See also ==
- List of United Kingdom Speedway League Champions
- Knockout Cup (speedway)
