= 1959 Southern Area League =

Final season of the British motorcycle speedway Southern Area League

- League: Southern Area League
- No. of competitors: 5
- Champions: Eastbourne Eagles
- Riders' Championship: Dave Hankins
- Highest average: Colin Gooddy
- Division/s above: 1959 National League

The 1959 Southern Area League was the final season of the Southern Area League as the regional second tier of speedway racing in the United Kingdom for Southern British teams. With no league in 1958, a set of 6 new teams competed in 1959.

== Summary ==
Eastbourne Eagles were the champions, Southern Rovers withdrew after just one league meeting and were replaced by Aldershot who inherited their result.

== Final table ==
Pos	Team	PL	W	D	L	Pts
1	Eastbourne Eagles	8	5	1	2	11
2	Yarmouth Bloaters	8	4	1	3	9
3	Aldershot Shots	8	4	0	4	8
4	Rye House	8	3	0	5	6
5	Ipswich Witches	8	3	0	5	6

Southern Rovers withdrew after one meeting (at Eastbourne) - result incorporated with Aldershot.

== Fixtures and results ==
Home \ Away	ALD	EAS	IPS	RYE	YAR
Aldershot		39–32	36–34	37–32	40–32
Eastbourne	38–34		49–23	38–3	46–26
Ipswich	36–35	55–17		35–37	25–47
Rye House	44–28	33–38	41–30		35–37
Yarmouth	49–22	36–36	32–39	44–28	

Legend: Blue = home team win; Yellow = draw; Red = away team win.

== Leading Averages ==
	Rider	Team	C.M.A.
1	Colin Gooddy	Eastbourne	10.76
2	Gil Goldfinch	Eastbourne & Ipswich	9.46
3	Johnny Fitzpatrick	Yarmouth	9.44
4	Derek Timms	Aldershot	9.38
5	Ivor Brown	Yarmouth	9.29

== Riders' Championship ==
Dave Hankins won the Riders' Championship. The final was held at Foxhall Stadium on 26 September.

Pos.	Rider	Club	Pts
1	Dave Hankins	Ipswich & Yarmouth	15
2	Derek Timms	Aldershot	13
3	Ivor Brown	Yarmouth	12
4	Shorty Schirmer	Ipswich	10
5	Colin Gooddy	Eastbourne	10
6	John Fitzpatrick	Yarmouth	9
7	Ronnie Rolfe	Rye House	9
8	Ross Gilbertson	Eastbourne	8
9	Eric Hockaday	Aldershot	8
10	Gil Goldfinch	Eastbourne & Ipswich	7
11	Ron Bagley (res)	Ipswich	4
12	Clive Hitch	Rye House	3
13	Ken Last	Ipswich & Yarmouth	3
14	Stan Stevens (res)	Rye House	3
15	Tommy Sweetman	Rye House	2
16	Ernie Baker	Rye House	2
17	Dave Still	Eastbourne	1
18	Bobby Croombs	Rye House	0
19	Ivor Toms (res)	Unattached	0

== Riders & final averages ==
Aldershot

- Derek Timms 9.38
- Peter Vandenberg 8.00
- Eric Hockaday 8.00
- Bob Thomas 7.00
- John Edwards 5.00
- Eric Eadon 4.20
- George Major 4.00
- Roy Pickering 4.00
- Ken Vale 3.08
- Arthur Ashby 1.33

Eastbourne

- Colin Gooddy 10.76
- Gil Goldfinch 9.50
- Dave Still 8.38
- Frank Bettis 6.13
- Ross Gilbertson 6.25
- John Dugard 4.40
- Bob Warner 3.17
- Peter Jarman 2.00
- Bob Dugard 1.33

Ipswich

- Gil Goldfinch 9.43
- Jimmy Heard 7.71
- Wal Morton 7.67
- Shorty Schirmer 7.60
- Ronnie Rolfe 7.08
- Bob Thomas 6.40
- Jimmy Gleed 4.76
- Ron Bagley 4.50
- Vic White 3.43
- Pat Flanagan 2.81

Rye House

- Tommy Sweetman 8.75
- Ronnie Rolfe 7.57
- Ernie Baker 6.77
- Clive Hitch 6.62
- Stan Stevens 6.36
- Bobby Croombs 6.17
- Pete Sampson 3.64

Yarmouth

- Ken Adams 12.00 (4 matches only)
- Ron Sharp 9.44
- Ray Harris 9.42
- Brian Craven 7.86
- Bill Wainwright 7.70
- Fred Collier 5.44
- Ken Last 4.40
- Tony Childs 3.00

== See also ==
- List of United Kingdom Speedway League Champions
- Knockout Cup (speedway)
