= 1956 Southern Area League =

British motorcycle speedway season

- League: Southern Area League
- No. of competitors: 4
- Champions: Rye House Roosters
- Riders' Champion: Leo McAuliffe
- Division/s above: National League Div 1 National League Div 2

The 1956 Southern Area League was the third season of the regional third tier/division of speedway racing in the United Kingdom British teams. Brafield Flying Foxes were no longer competitors with Southern Rovers taking their place. Southern Rovers had no track and raced all their 'home' fixtures on away tracks.

== Summary ==
Rye House Roosters were the champions for the second consecutive season.

Although the Southern Area League continued, it became the second tier division instead of the third tier division. There was not another third division of British speedway until 1996 when the Conference was inaugurated.

== Final table ==
pos	Team	PL	W	D	L	Pts
1	Rye House Roosters	12	8	1	3	17
2	Eastbourne Eagles	12	6	1	5	13
3	Southern Rovers	12	4	2	6	10
4	California Poppies	12	4	0	8	8

== Fixtures & results ==
=== A fixtures ===
Home \ Away	CAL	EAS	RYE	SR
California		40–44	47–36	58–24
Eastbourne	55–28		29–54	36–48
Rye House	52–32	54–30		42–42
Southern Rovers	39–45	47–36	49–35	

Legend: Blue = home team win; Yellow = draw; Red = away team win.

=== B fixtures ===
Home \ Away	CAL	EAS	RYE	SR
California		40–43	43–39	41–42
Eastbourne	49–32		40–37	41–41
Rye House	56–26	56–28		52–32
Southern Rovers	42–41	41–43	32–52	

Legend: Blue = home team win; Yellow = draw; Red = away team win.

== Riders' Championship ==
Leo McAuliffe won the Riders' Championship. The final was held at Rye House Stadium on 30 September, after initially being postponed on the 9 September because of rain.

Pos.	Rider	Club	Pts
1	Leo McAuliffe	Eastbourne	14
2	Jim Heard	Eastbourne	12+3
3	Dave Slater	Rye House	12+2
4	Pete Mould	California	12+1
5	Gerry King	Rye House	8
6	Brian Brett	Rye House	8
7	Jimmy Gleed	California	7
8	Vic Ridgeon	Rye House	7
9	Ron Webb	California	5
10	Eric Eadon	Southern Rovers	5
11	Tom Reader	Eastbourne	5
12	Neil Roberts (res)	Southern Rovers	5
13	Bobby Croombs	Rye House	4
14	Ross Gilbertson	California	4
15	Dave Collett	Eastbourne	3
16	Jim Chalkley	Rye House	2
17	Ron Walton	California	2
18	Colin Gooddy (res)	Southern Rovers	1

== Southern Area League Cup ==
The 1956 Southern Area League Cup was won by Rye House Roosters.

First round

Team one	Team two	Score
Southern Rovers	Rye House	50–58
Eastbourne	California	46–61

=== Final ===
First leg

1 July 1956

California Peter Mould 13 Ross Gilbertson 9 Jim Gleed 9 Ron Sharp 8 Ron Webb 7 Phil Shepherd 6.5 Roy Gutteridge 3 Ron Walton 2	60.5 – 46.5	Rye House Vic Ridgeon 15 Bobby Croombs 13 Les Searle 10 Dave Slater 6 Jim Chalkley 4 Porky Veal 3 Gerry King 2 Brian Brett 1.5

California Country Park

Second leg

8 July 1956

Rye House Vic Ridgeon 18 Bobby Croombs 11 Dave Slater 10 Gerald King 9 Jim Chalkley 7 Brian Brett 5 Porky Veal 5 Ernie Baker 5	70 – 38	California Pete Mould 13 Gil Goldfinch 12 Ron Webb 3 Jimmy Gleed 3 Phil Shepherd 3 Roy Gutteridge 2 Ron Walton 1 John Day 1

Rye House Stadium

== Riders & final averages ==
California

- Pete Mold 9.67
- Gil Goldfinch 9.50
- Ross Gilbertson 8.86
- Ron Sharp 8.57
- Jimmy Gleed 6.93
- Ron Walton 4.91
- Phil Sheppard 4.47
- Roy Gutteridge 3.50
- John Day 3.33
- Ron Webb 2.88

Eastbourne

- Leo McAuliffe 8.57
- Jimmy Heard 7.14
- Tom Reader 7.00
- Gerry Bridson 5.87
- Dave Collett 5.33
- Bob Bunney 4.80
- Jim Preddy 2.00

Rye House

- Al Sparrey 9.67
- Vic Ridgeon 9.50
- Bobby Croombs 8.60
- Dave Slater 9.67
- Brian Brett 7.56
- Gerry King 7.20
- Jim Chalkley 5.80
- Les Searle 2.00

Southern Rovers

- Eric Hockaday 9.47
- Tommy Sweetman 9.09
- Colin Gooddy 8.52
- Brian Meredith 7.33
- Eric Eadon 7.11
- Brian Miller 5.33
- Tony Eadon 4.31
- Mike Lawrence 4.24
- Neil Roberts 4.00
- Hank Bird 3.08

== See also ==
- List of United Kingdom Speedway League Champions
- Knockout Cup (speedway)
