= Southern Area League Riders' Championship =

Speedway competition

- Sport: Speedway
- Founded: 1954
- Folded: 1960
- Country: United Kingdom

Notes
- replaced by the Provincial League Riders' Championship

The Southern Area League Riders' Championship was a contest between the top riders with the highest average points total from motorcycle speedway clubs competing in the Southern Area League in the United Kingdom. It was held in each year that the league existed - between 1954 and 1959 and also during 1960, when several teams without league racing raced a series of challenge matches.

The event was superseded by the Provincial League Riders' Championship because the Provincial League replaced the Southern Area League in 1960.

== Winners ==
Year	Winner	Team	Venue
1954	(England) Alby Golden	Ringwood Turfs	Rye House Stadium
1955	(England) Mike Broadbank	Rye House Roosters	Rye House Stadium
1956	(Wales) Leo McAuliffe	Eastbourne Eagles	Rye House Stadium
1957	(Wales) Leo McAuliffe	Rayleigh/Southern Rovers	Arlington Stadium
1959	(England) Dave Hankins	Yarmouth Bloaters	Foxhall Stadium
1960	(Scotland) Ross Gilbertson	Eastbourne Eagles	Arlington Stadium

== See also ==
- List of United Kingdom Speedway League Riders' champions
- Southern Area League
