= Southern Rovers =

Motorcycle speedway team

Club information
- Track address: Rayleigh Weir Stadium; Weir between Rayleigh and Thundersley
- Country: England
- Founded: 1956
- Closed: 1959
- League: Southern Area League

Major team honours
Southern Area League champions	1957

Southern Rovers were a British motorcycle speedway team between 1956 and 1959. They were the champions of the Southern Area League during 1957. The team were unique to speedway at the time because they completed a league season despite having no home stadium to ride from.

== History ==
The origins of the team began in early 1956, following the demise of Brafield Flying Foxes in the Southern Area League and the slightly earlier demise of Ringwood Turfs. The Southern Area League was faced with a serious problem in that only three teams (Rye House Roosters, Eastbourne Eagles and California Poppies) would have lined up for the 1956 season and therefore the promoters got together and agreed the formation of a team that could race at the three remaining venues. The 'Home fixtures' for Southern Rovers would consist of riding at one of the venues not belonging to the fixture they were engaged in (for example the home match against Eastbourne would be held at either Rye House or California)

Rovers' team manager Les King also lost the services of their rider Vic Hall (formerly of Brafield) to injury. Therefore, the team did extremely well to finish third in the table and were assisted by the consistent riding of Eric Hockaday, Colin Gooddy and Eric Eadon.

The following season the team secured a base at the home of Rayleigh Rockets at the Rayleigh Weir Stadium, which led to some match reports as the team being called Rayleigh II or Rayleigh Rovers. The experience of riding away must have helped as Southern Rovers won the title the following season (1957 Southern Area League). Five riders made the top ten league averages for the season; Colin Gooddy, Leo McAuliffe, Stan Clark, Brian Meredith and Vic Hall.

The league ceased to operate for the 1958 season but returned for the 1959 Southern Area League season. However, the Southern Rovers withdrew after just one league fixture on 31 May 1959 and had their results expunged.

== Season summary ==
Year and league	Position	Notes
1956 Southern Area League	3rd	
1957 Southern Area League	1st	Champions
1959 Southern Area League	N/A	withdrew after 1 fixture
