= Southern Riders' Championship =

British motorcycle speedway competition

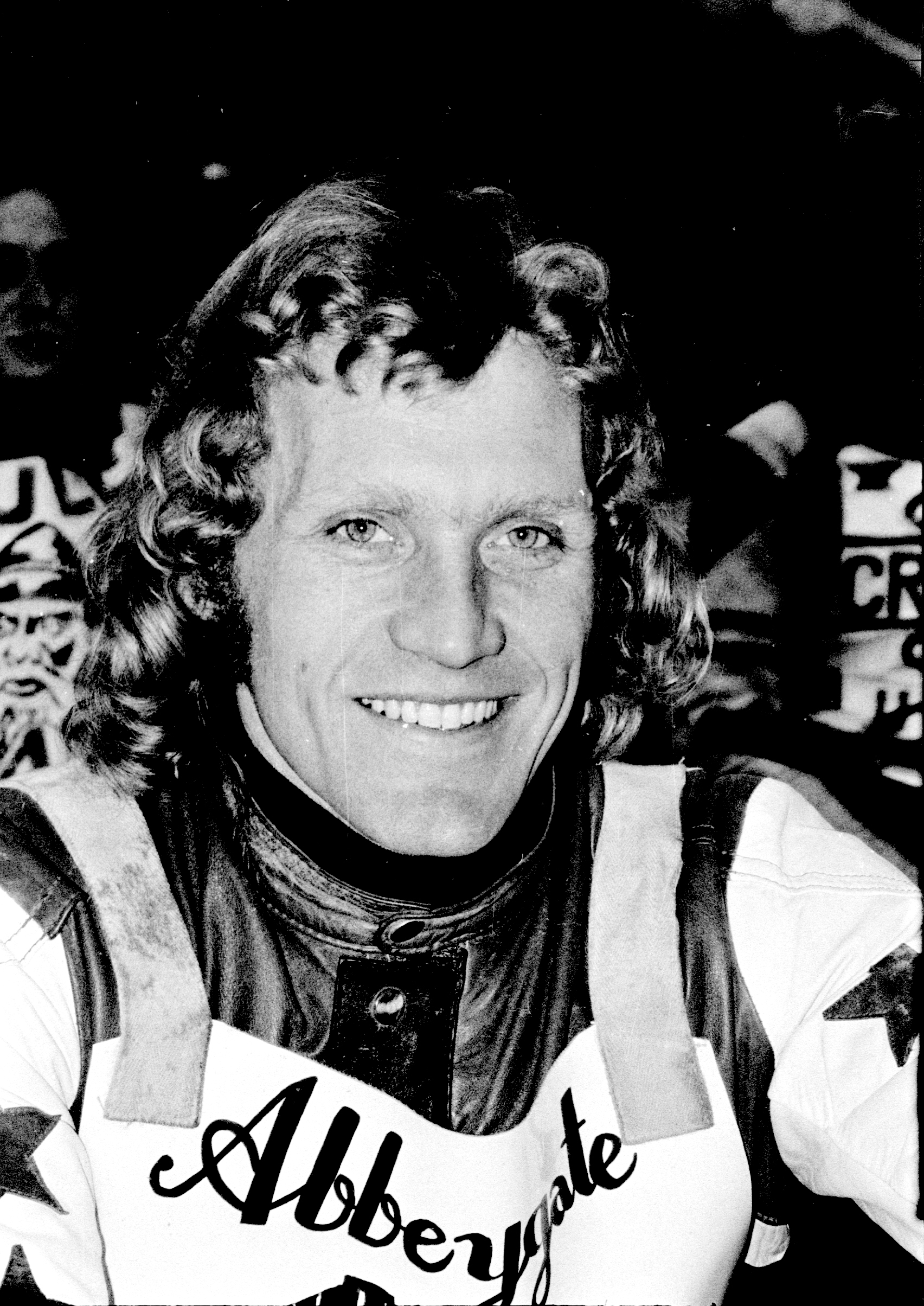
- Terry Betts, twice winner
- Sport: motorcycle speedway
- Founded: 1958
- Folded: 1992
- Country: United Kingdom

The Southern Riders' Championship was an individual motorcycle speedway competition inaugurated in 1958 for top riders of teams from the South of Great Britain and staged intermittently until 1992.

== Past winners ==
Year	Winner	Team	Venue	Ref
1958	( (New Zealand) ) Barry Briggs	Wimbledon Dons	Wimbledon Stadium	
1959	( (England) ) Ron How	Wimbledon Dons	Poole Stadium	
1960	( (Sweden) ) Ove Fundin	Norwich Stars	New Cross Stadium	
1961 Not staged
1962*	( (Australia) ) Geoff Mudge	Poole Pirates	County Ground Stadium	
1963 Not staged
1964*	( (England) ) Tommy Sweetman	Wolverhampton Wolves	Monmore Green Stadium	
	1965-1968 Not staged			
1969	( (England) ) Colin Pratt	Hackney Hawks	King's Lynn Stadium	
1970	( (England) ) Terry Betts	King's Lynn Stars	Wimbledon Stadium	
1971	( (England) ) Terry Betts	King's Lynn Stars	Wimbledon Stadium	
1972-1974 Not staged
1975	( (Sweden) ) Tommy Jansson	Wimbledon Dons	Wimbledon Stadium	
1976	( (England) ) John Louis	Ipswich Witches	Reading Stadium	
	1977-1983 Not staged			
1984	( (England) ) Jamie Luckhurst	Canterbury Crusaders	Arena Essex Raceway	
1985	( (England) ) Jamie Luckhurst	Wimbledon Dons	Arena Essex Raceway	
1986	( (England) ) Martn Dugard	Eastbourne Eagles	Wimborne Road	
1987	( (England) ) Andy Buck	Eastbourne Eagles	Wimborne Road	
1988	( (England) ) Andy Galvin	Hackney Kestrels	Hackney Wick Stadium	
1989	( (England) ) Andy Galvin	Hackney Kestrels	Hackney Wick Stadium	
1990	( (England) ) Steve Schofield	Hackney Kestrels	Hackney Wick Stadium	
1991	( (Denmark) ) Brian Karger	Arena Essex Hammers	Rye House Stadium	

* 1962 and 1964 - Provincial League Southern Riders Championship

== See also ==
- List of United Kingdom Speedway League Riders' champions
