= Georgie Wood =

British grasstrack and speedway rider (born 1993)

- Born: 8 September 1993 (age 33); Maidstone, Kent
- Nationality: British (English)

Career history
- 2015–2019: Eastbourne Eagles
- 2017–2018: Sheffield Tigers
- 2019: Isle of Wight Warriors

Team honours
- 2017: SGB Championship
- 2018: National League
- 2015, 2016, 2017, 2018: National League Knockout Cup
- 2015: National League Gold Cup
- 2015: National Trophy

Georgie Andrew Wood (born 8 September 1993) is a grasstrack and speedway rider from England.

== Career ==
=== 2015-2016 seasons ===
Wood began speedway racing in 2015, signing for Eastbourne Eagles as one of their reserves after the team dropped down to the National League that season. During the season, he increased his average from the starting 3.00 to 5.90 and, after sitting August out with ligament damage to his knee, moved out of the reserve position to ride at number 2. Riding at number 2, he scored his first paid-maximum from 4 rides by scoring 11+1 on 12 September in a National Trophy fixture against Mildenhall Fen Tigers. Wood helped the Eagles win a National League treble, with the team winning the Knockout Cup, Gold Cup and National Trophy.

Following his successful first season, on 17 November 2015, it was confirmed that Wood would ride again for Eastbourne in the 2016 season. He had another good season, this time increasing his average to 7.62, spending most of the season riding as a heat-leader at number 3 or 4. Wood again won the Knockout Cup, with the Eagles defeating Birmingham Brummies in the final.

=== 2017 season ===
==== Eastbourne ====
Wood signed for Eastbourne for the third season in a row on 17 November 2016, and he was also named team captain for the 2017 season. In July, Wood made it to the top of the Eastbourne's averages, meaning that he would ride at number 1 for the first time. He lost his place at number 1 to Jake Knight at the end of the month. He scored his first full maximum, getting 18 points from 6 rides, in the National League play-off semi-final against Kent Kings.

Wood finished the season with an average of 7.61, a slight decrease to his starting average. This was a consequence of having acquired the much trickier position of number 5 for most of the season. He also helped Eastbourne win the Knockout Cup for the third successive season; this time, the Eagles beat Mildenhall Fen Tigers in the final.

==== Sheffield ====
Due to his impressive start to the season with Eastbourne, on 19 July, Sheffield Tigers signed Wood as a replacement for the injured Nathan Stoneman at reserve, with a starting average of 2.00. Wood finished the season with an average of 2.31, and Sheffield won the SGB Championship by beating Ipswich Witches in the play-off final.

In heat 7 of the promotion/relegation meeting against Leicester Lions, Wood beat former British Speedway Champion Danny King.

=== 2018 season ===
==== Eastbourne ====
On 21 December 2017, it was announced that Wood would ride for Eastbourne for the fourth successive season in the National League. Wood started in the number 5 position, but he regained the number 1 race jacket following the release of the first new set of averages. Wood lost the number 1 position to Tom Brennan for the month of July, but retook it in September; he stayed in it for the remainder of the season. For the fourth consecutive season, Wood won the Knockout Cup, with Eastbourne defeating Mildenhall Fen Tigers in the final. He also helped Eastbourne win their first league title in 18 years by winning the National League Play-Off Final against Mildenhall Fen Tigers.

==== Sheffield ====
Wood didn't start the season in the Sheffield septet; however, the Tigers had a poor start to the season and with Wood on top form for Eastbourne, Sheffield decided to make team changes. This saw Wood and Broc Nicol come into the side, on 20 June, to replace Jack Smith and Jan Graversen respectively. Wood gave up his Championship place on 27 July to focus on his racing with Eastbourne; he was replaced in the Sheffield side by Joe Lawlor.

=== 2019 season ===
==== Eastbourne ====
Wood joined Eastbourne again for a fifth season in a row, and he continued with them in their move up to the SGB Championship. According to the Championship average declarations on 2 August 2019, Wood's average was 3.78. In late August 2019, according to Eastbourne Eagles and SpeedwayGB, Georgie Wood had been banned from racing in the leagues for 28 days because he had not been riding in certain speedway matches. His failure to ride in these matches was, in turn, due to medical problems.

==== Isle of Wight ====
With Eastbourne going into the Championship, Wood needed to find a new National League club. It was announced on 16 December 2018 that he had signed for the Isle of Wight Warriors. National League average declarations on 2 August 2019 gave him a 9.6 average.
