= Andy Galvin =

British speedway rider

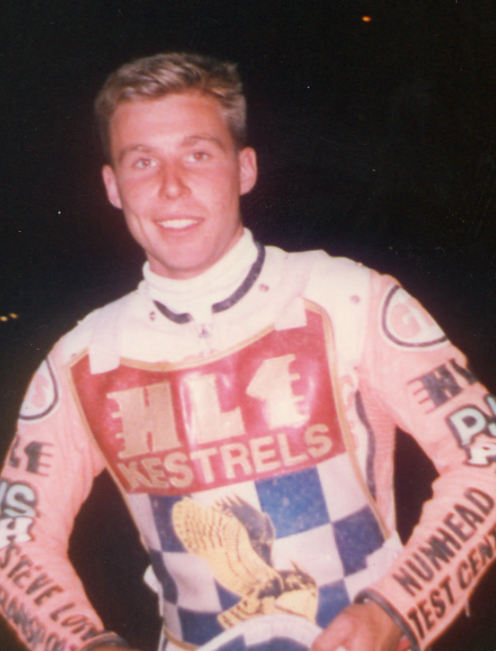
- Galvin in 1988
- Born: 13 November 1965 (age 61); Whitstable, England
- Nationality: British (English)

Career history
- 1982-1983: Crayford Kestrels
- 1984-1990: Hackney Kestrels
- 1984: Wimbledon Dons
- 1986: Reading Racers
- 1988: Swindon Robins
- 1988: Cradley Heathens
- 1988: Sheffield Tigers
- 1988: Ipswich Witches
- 1991-93, 2001-03: Arena Essex Hammers

Individual honours
- 1988: London Riders Champion
- 1988, 1989: Spring Classic Champion
- 1988, 1989: Southern Riders Champion
- 1989: 16 Lap Classic Champion

Team honours
- 1988, 1991: league (tier 2) winner
- 1984, 1988, 1991: Knockout Cup (tier 2) winner
- 1990: National League Pairs Winner
- 1991: Fours (tier 2) winner

Andrew Simon Galvin (born 13 November 1965 in Whitstable, Kent, United Kingdom) was a motorcycle speedway rider, most notable for his performances in the late 1980s and 1990 when he consistently appeared near the top of the UK National League averages.

== Career Summary ==
Galvin raced for several British league clubs during his career, starting with Crayford Kestrels in 1982, but spent his most successful years with the Hackney Kestrels between 1984 and 1990. In 1988, he won the London Riders' Championship and was the Southern Riders Champion in 1988 and 1989.

In 1990, Galvin won the National League Pairs, partnering Steve Schofield for Hackney, during the 1990 National League season. He made one appearance for England in a test match against the USA in 1991.

Riding with the Arena Essex Hammers in 1993, Galvin suffered a serious accident which left him with serious neck, back, ribs and pelvis injuries.

After a break of nearly ten years, Galvin returned to racing in 2001 but, after failing to recapture his previous form, retired again midway through the 2003 season. At retirement he had earned one international cap for the England national speedway team.
