= Geoff Mardon =

New Zealand motorcycle speedway rider

- Born: 24 November 1927; Christchurch, New Zealand
- Died: 6 August 2015 (aged 87); Christchurch, New Zealand

Career history
- 1951: Aldershot Shots
- 1952–1954: Wimbledon Dons
- 1959: Southampton Saints

Individual honours
- 1954: Brandonapolis
- 1964: New Zealand Champion

Team honours
- 1954: National League Champions
- 1953: National Trophy
- 1954: RAC Cup Winner

Geoffrey Cyril Mardon (24 November 1927 – 6 August 2015) was a New Zealand motorcycle speedway rider. He earned 10 caps for the New Zealand national speedway team.

== Career ==
Mardon began riding at the Aranui Speedway in Christchurch in 1949, the same track that would later start the careers of World Champions and fellow Christchurch natives Barry Briggs and Ivan Mauger. He moved to England in 1951 and joined the third division team, Aldershot Shots. He qualified as second reserve for the 1951 World Final. The following year, he moved up the first division to ride for the Wimbledon Dons. He rode in the 1953 World Final and finished in third place. In 1954, Mardon was the third highest individual points scorer in the National League. He rode in the World final again and he won the Brandonapolis at Coventry. Later in the year he married Valerie Moore, the sister of Ronnie Moore.

At the beginning of 1955, Mardon decided to retire and live in New Zealand. After a four-year break, Southampton Saints persuaded him to return to British speedway in 1959. He rode for the Saints for a year and qualified for the World final. He continued to race when he returned to New Zealand and in 1964 he won the New Zealand Championship.

Mardon also raced cars. In 1954, he competed in an Erskine Staride in England, and in 1958, he drove a RA Vanguard in the Lady Wigram Trophy race. In the mid 1960s, he drove a New Zealand built sportscar, the Stanton Corvette and in 1970 and 1971 he drove for the Begg Chevrolet Formula 5000 team in the Tasman Series and the New Zealand Gold Star Championship.

Mardon died on 6 August 2015 in Christchurch.

== World final appearances ==
Mardon had four appearances in world championship finals:

- 1951 - (England) London, Wembley Stadium - Reserve - Did Not Ride
- 1953 - (England) London, Wembley Stadium - 3rd - 12pts
- 1954 - (England) London, Wembley Stadium - 11th - 5pts
- 1959 - (England) London, Wembley Stadium - 10th - 6pts
