= Bryan Elliott =

English speedway rider (1930-2015)

- Born: 12 April 1930; Halifax, West Yorkshire, England
- Died: 27 November 2015 (aged 85); Adelaide, Australia
- Nationality: British (English)

Career history
- 1954–1962: Leicester Hunters
- 1955: Ringwood Turfs
- 1957: Southern Rovers
- 1962–1964: Coventry Bees
- 1965: Halifax Dukes

Individual honours
- 1960: Speedway World Championship finalist

Bryan Elliott (12 April 1930 – 27 November 2015) was a motorcycle speedway rider from England. He earned 6 international caps for the England national speedway team.

== Speedway career ==
Elliott reached the final of the Speedway World Championship in the 1960 Individual Speedway World Championship.

Elliott rode in the top tier of British Speedway from 1954 to 1965, riding for various clubs; between June 1957 and September 1961, he rode in 148 consecutive matches.

After riding for Coventry Bees for three seasons from 1962 to 1964, Elliott joined Halifax Dukes for the 1965 season.

Elliott later emigrated to Australia, where he died on 27 November 2015.

== World final appearances ==
=== Individual World Championship ===
- 1960 - (England) London, Wembley Stadium - 16th - 0pts
