= Tommy Sweetman =

British speedway rider

- Born: 21 July 1930 (age 96); Islington, London, England
- Nationality: British (English)

Career history
- 1954: Aldershot Shots
- 1954–1956: California Poppies
- 1956: Wimbledon Dons
- 1956–1957: Southern Rovers
- 1957: Rayleigh Rockets
- 1958: Norwich Stars
- 1959: Swindon Robins
- 1959: Rye House Rockets
- 1960–1961: New Cross Rangers
- 1961–1965, 1969: Wolverhampton Wolves
- 1966–1968: Exeter Falcons
- 1969: Hackney Hawks

Individual honours
- 1964: Southern Riders' Championship

Team honours
- 1954, 1957: Southern Area League
- 1963: Provincial League

Thomas Henry Sweetman (born 21 July 1930) is a former motorcycle speedway rider from England. He earned six international caps for the England national speedway team.

== Career ==
Sweetman started his British leagues career for Aldershot Shots in the 1954 Southern Area League but the team withdrew and he finished the season with California Poppies, where he won the leagues with the club.

Sweetman spent the 1955 and 1956 seasons with the Poppies but in 1956 he also rode for nomadic Southern Rovers. In 1957, he rode for the Rayleigh Rockets reserve team before taking the big step up to the National League, where he joined the Norwich Stars for the 1958 Speedway National League season.

In 1959, Sweetman switched to Swindon Robins and doubled up with the Rye House Rockets in the Southern League, where he finished sixth in the league averages. The following season he joined New Cross Rangers for the 1960 Speedway National League and also raced for them in 1961. This was also the same year that he started his Wolverhampton Wolves career.

It was with Wolves that Sweetman won the 1963 Provincial Speedway League and won the Southern Riders' Championship in 1964. He followed the team into the 1965 British League season, where he enjoyed another solid season. In 1966, he moved to Exeter Falcons and top scored for the team during the 1966 British League season, which earned him a place in the 1966 British League Riders' Championship. He rode for Exeter for three seasons before having one final season with Hackney Hawks in 1969.
