= Dave Hankins =

British speedway rider (1937–2024)

- Born: 26 May 1937; Northampton, Northamptonshire, England
- Died: 14 April 2024 (aged 86)
- Nationality: British (English)

Career history
- 1954–1955: Brafield Flying Foxes
- 1956: Southern Rovers
- 1957: Norwich Stars
- 1958–1959: Ipswich Witches
- 1959–1961: Leicester Hunters
- 1959: Yarmouth Bloaters
- 1963: Cradley Heathens

Individual honours
- 1959: Southern Area League Riders' Championship

David Herbert Hankins (26 May 1937 – 14 April 2024) was an English motorcycle speedway rider.

== Biography ==
Hankins started racing in the British leagues during the 1954 Southern Area League season, when riding for the Brafield Flying Foxes. He remained with the club the following season, improving his average to 5.91.

In 1956, Brafield were replaced in the Southern Area League by Southern Rovers and Hankins rode a couple of times for the club in the 1956 Southern Area League. His career was revived the following season when he joined the Norwich Stars in the top division and he rode alongside the likes of 1956 world champion Ove Fundin.

For the 1958 season, Hankins joined Ipswich Witches but it is not known if he actually started for them. In 1959, he rode for Leicester Hunters in the top division and doubled up in the Southern Area League, riding for Yarmouth Bloaters and later Ipswich Witches. It was during 1959 that Hankins achieved his greatest success when he won the Southern Area League Riders' Championship. The final was held at Foxhall Stadium on 26 September. His season got better after he received a contract to ride in the 1960 Australian season.

He remained with Leicester for the 1960 season, where he had a promising season and entering 1961 with Leicester he was still only 23 years of age. However, he received a double blow in 1961, first in May he suffered pneumonia and pleurisy and then during a World Championship qualifying round he broke his femur. The serious injury effectively ended his career because he underwent 18 months rehabilitation and was only fit to ride by 1963.

In 1963, Hankins did join Cradley Heathens but only made two appearances for the club before calling it a day after he picked up another injury.

Hankins died on 14 April 2024, aged 86.
