= Aldershot Shots =

Motorcycle speedway team

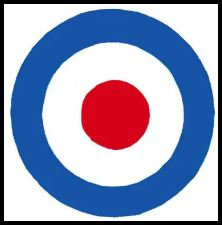

Club information
- Track address: Aldershot Stadium; Oxenden Road; Tongham near Farnham; Surrey
- Country: England
- Founded: 1950
- Closed: 1960
- League: National League Division Three; Southern League; Southern Area League

Aldershot Shots also known later as Aldershot Poppies were a speedway team that existed from 1950 to 1960, they were based primarily at Aldershot Stadium in Tongham, near Farnham.

== History ==
In 1929, eight meetings were held at the 25 acres Aldershot Sports Stadium on Boxall's Lane. The first of these was held on Wednesday 3 July 1929. Although seven of the meetings were individual events there was one team fixture against Southampton Saints. The stadium is known to have hosted speedway in 1931 but would later become a reservoir (known as Badshot Lea Little Pond). The date that the stadium was demolished is unknown.

In 1950, speedway returned to Aldershot at the greyhound stadium known as Aldershot Stadium. The track was completed by February 1950 and a team was entered for the National League Division Three season, where the team finished the season in fifth place. In 1951, the finished slightly better in third place. The star of the 1950 and 1951 team was Trevor Redmond while his fellow Kiwi Geoff Mardon was also a star man.

In 1952, the third division was replaced by the Southern League and Aldershot finished 7th. In 1953, the stadium was used for open meetings.

A team called the California Poppies moved to Aldershot in 1957 and were renamed the Aldershot Poppies. The team competed in the 1957 Southern Area League, Aldershot reverted to the name Shots and had one more season of league racing in 1959.

In 1960, after a short season of open meetings, the speedway track closed.

== Notable riders ==
- (Scotland) Ross Gilbertson
- (New Zealand) Geoff Mardon
- (New Zealand) Trevor Redmond

== Season summary ==
Year and league	Position	Notes
1950 Speedway National League Division Three	5th	
1951 Speedway National League Division Three	3rd	
1952 Speedway Southern League	7th	
1957 Southern Area League	4th	known as Aldershot Poppies
1959 Southern Area League	3rd	

== See also ==
- Category:Aldershot Shots riders
- List of defunct motorcycle speedway teams in the United Kingdom
