= Brian Brett (speedway rider) =

English speedway rider

- Born: 3 April 1938; Stanstead Abbotts, East Hertfordshire, England
- Died: 14 November 2006 (aged 68); Harlow, Essex, England
- Nationality: British (English)

Career history
- 1956-1957: Rye House Roosters
- 1958: Ipswich Witches
- 1958-1960: Southampton Saints
- 1960-1964: Swindon Robins
- 1965-1966: Newcastle Diamonds
- 1967: Cradley Heathens

Individual honours
- 1965: Speedway World Championship finalist

Team honours
- 1956: Southern Area League
- 1956: Southern Area League Cup
- 1961: National Trophy

Brian Christopher Brett (3 April 1938 - 14 November 2006) was a motorcycle speedway rider from England.

== Speedway career ==
Brett first rode in British speedway for the Rye House Roosters during the 1956 Southern Area League, when he was the youngest rider in the country. He helped the Rye House team win the league title and league cup.

From 1958 to 1960, Brett rode in top tier of British Speedway for Southampton Saints. before joining the Swindon Robins, where he would spend five seasons from 1960 to 1964 and his successes included winning the 1961 National Trophy. He joined Newcastle Diamonds in 1965 and would ride for them for two seasons.

Brett reached the final of the Speedway World Championship in the 1965 Individual Speedway World Championship.

At retirement, Brett had earned three international caps for the England national speedway team and four caps for Great Britain.

== World final appearances ==
=== Individual World Championship ===
- 1965 – (England) London, Wembley Stadium – 6th – 9pts

=== World Team Cup ===
- 1964 - (West Germany) Abensberg, Abensberg Stadion (with Barry Briggs / Ron How / Ken McKinlay / Nigel Boocock) - 3rd - 21pts (0)
