= Mike Broadbank =

British motorcycle speedway rider

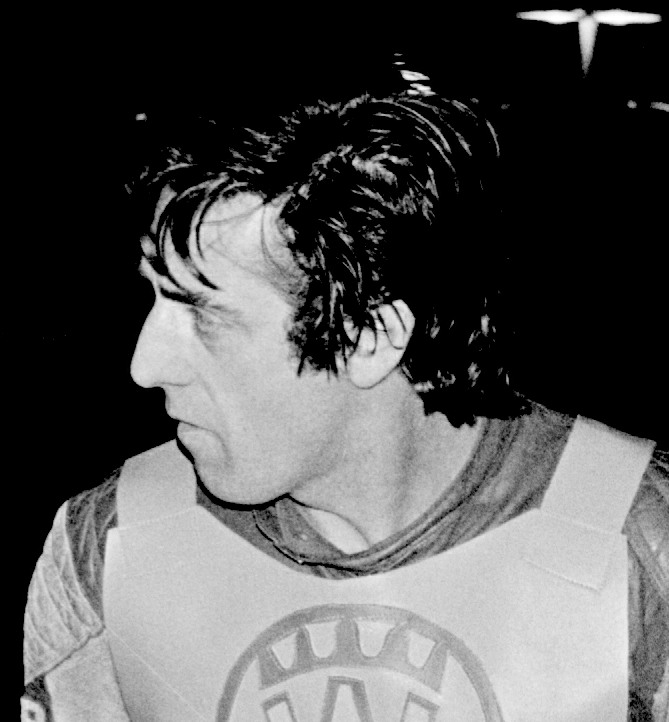
- Born: 23 September 1934 (age 92); Hoddesdon, England
- Nationality: British (English)

Career history
- 1955: Rye House Roosters
- 1956: Wembley Lions
- 1957–1972: Swindon Robins
- 1973–1974: Chesterton/Stoke Potters
- 1973, 1975: Hackney Hawks
- 1973: Reading Racers
- 1973: Poole Pirates
- 1973: Oxford Rebels
- 1976: Crayford Kestrels
- 1977: Newport Dragons

Individual honours
- 1963: Australian Champion
- 1964: London Riders' Champion
- 1955: Southern Area League Riders' Championship

Team honours
- 1955: Southern Area League Champion
- 1957: National League Champion
- 1967: British League Champion
- 1967, 1968: Midland Cup

Michael John Broadbank (also known as Broadbanks) (born 23 September 1934 in Hoddesdon) is an English former international motorcycle speedway rider who made 560 appearances for the Swindon Robins, scoring over 4,200 points.

== Career ==
Broadbank was first discovered at the Rye House track after working there as a young boy. He won the Southern Area League Riders' Championship, held at Rye House Stadium on 25 September 1955. After impressing at Rye House he managed to get a full-time ride with the Wembley Lions in 1956.

In 1960, the Rye House speedway track was rebuilt by Broadbank, along with his father Alfred. Broadbank ran the speedway team known as the Red Devils who raced in challenge matches from 1960 unil 1966. The name Red Devils related to the red leathers worn by Broadbank, when almost all riders wore black.

Broadbank then started his long association with Robins before moving on to the Hackney Hawks, Reading Racers and the Stoke Potters. Whilst with Robins he captained the side to the British League title in 1967. He reached the final of the Speedway World Championship on five occasions.

Broadbank was also a regular visitor to Australia and won the Australian Individual Speedway Championship at the Rockhampton Speedway in 1963, to date the last time a rider from England won the Australian title. Broadbank defeated Queensland rider Keith Gurtner, and a rising star from New Zealand named Ivan Mauger, to win the title.

At retirement, Broadbank had earned 28 international caps for the England national speedway team and 8 caps for Great Britain.

In 2006, Broadbank was awarded a belated testimonial for sixteen years of service with Swindon.

== World Final Appearances ==
- 1958 - (England) London, Wembley Stadium - 12th - 5pts
- 1961 - (Sweden) Malmö, Malmö Stadion - 16th - 2pts
- 1962 - (England) London, Wembley Stadium - 15th - 2pts
- 1964 - (Sweden) Gothenburg, Ullevi - 9th - 6pts
- 1965 - (England) London, Wembley Stadium - Reserve - Did not ride
- 1966 - (Sweden) Göteborg, Ullevi - 13th - 4pts
- 1967 - (England) London, Wembley Stadium - Reserve - Did not ride
