= California Poppies =

British speedway team

Club information
- Track address: Longmoor Speedway, California Country Park, California, Berkshire
- Country: England
- Founded: 1933
- Closed: 1957

Major team honours
Southern Area League Champions	1954

California Poppies were a British speedway team based at Longmoor Speedway, California Country Park, near Wokingham, Berkshire.

== History ==
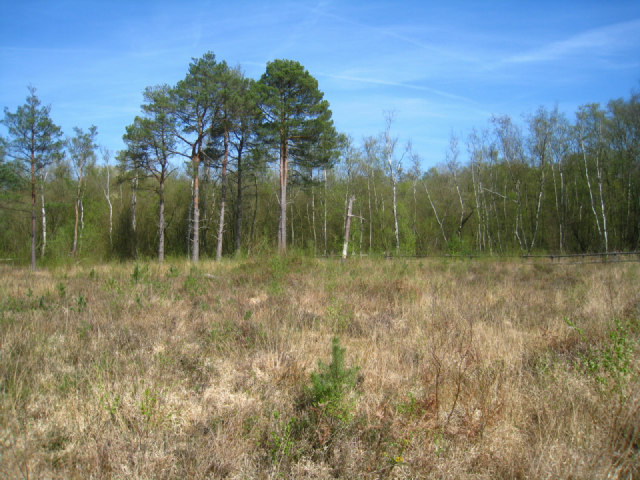
Marshland at California Country Park. Similar land was used for the construction of a track.

Speedway in California, Berkshire first started in 1933 at the California Country Park. The track was situated on the north west side of Longmoor Lake (51°22'54.3"N 0°52'35.4"W) on land that formed part of Longmoor Bog and the track had a concrete starting grid. Events were held every year from 1933 to 1940 before the Reading and District Motor Club ended racing due to World War II.

The team known as California Poppies first raced league speedway in 1954 in the 1954 Southern Area League and were crowned champions. The following season in 1955, they finished runner-up to Rye House Roosters before they competed for one more league season in 1955, finishing 4th.

The team disbanded the following season with the promotion and nickname moving to Aldershot to become the Aldershot Poppies. The move was primarily made because of the petrol rationing caused by the Suez Crisis.

== Season summary ==
Year and league	Position	Notes
1954 Southern Area League	1st	Champions
1955 Southern Area League	2nd	
1956 Southern Area League	4th	

== Notable riders ==
- Jimmy Gleed
- Gil Goldfinch
- Peter Mould
- Tommy Sweetman

== See also ==
- Category:California Poppies riders
- List of United Kingdom Speedway League Champions
