= Eastbourne Eagles =

English motorcycle speedway team

Club information
- Track address: Arlington Stadium; Arlington; Hailsham; Sussex
- Country: England
- Founded: 1929
- Closed: 2021
- Website: www.eastbourne-speedway.com

Club facts
- Colours: Blue & Yellow
- Track size: 275 metres (301 yd)
- Track record time: 54.9 seconds
- Track record holder: Jason Crump & Chris Holder

Major team honours
British Champions	1995, 2000
Division 2 champions	1959, 1971, 1977, 1986, 1987
Division 3 champions	1947, 2018
Knockout Cup winners	1994, 1997, 2002, 2008
Knockout Cup Div 2	1975, 1977, 1978, 1985, 1986, 1987
Knockout Cup Div 3	2015, 2016, 2017, 2018

The Eastbourne Eagles were a British motorcycle speedway team, based at Arlington Stadium, near Eastbourne, England. They were founded in 1929 and are two times champions of Britain in 1995 and 2000. The team last raced on 31 July 2021.

== History ==
=== Origins & 1930s ===
During 1928 the Eastbourne Motorcycle Sports Club purchased a field in Arlington for the purposes of dirt track racing. Practice sessions took place before the official opening on 5 August 1929 by the Arlington Motor Sports Club.

Over the following years the race meetings continued at regular intervals but there was still no team formed to compete in the British league system. However the Hailsham Cup was the main prize available and large attendances frequented the track. In 1937, George Newton broke the track record, which lasted until 1955. In 1938, a team was formed to compete in the Sunday Amateur Dirt Track League. The team included Tiger Hart, Bob Lovell, Danny Lee, Charlie Dugard, Stan Johns, Charlie Page and Jack Collins. Activity at Arlington ended during 1939 due to the outbreak of World War II but did return for a one off meeting in March 1940.

=== 1940s ===
After the war, Charlie Dugard bought the track and it underwent extensive repairs before opening again on 14 July 1946. The following season the team joined the 1947 Speedway National League Division Three and led by captain Ken Tidbury and top scorer Wally Green, they became champions. Despite winning the title at their first attempt they were forced to close down due to a petrol ban enforced at their Arlington Stadium. They decided to transfer their team to Hastings Saxons and at the beginning of 1948 the Speedway Control Board granted a licence to Hastings to stage speedway. Eastbourne would not compete again in the league until they joined the Southern Area League in 1954, although challenge matches were held during 1950 and 1953.

=== 1950s ===
The team returned to compete in the Southern Area League and struggled until Leo McAuliffe and Jimmy Heard helped lift them to second place in 1956. McAuliffe won the Southern Area League Riders' Championship the same year. Another second place in 1957 was followed by a season of challenge matches in 1958. In 1959, they won the 1959 Southern Area League, which was the second division league.

=== 1960s ===
In 1960, the club were refused entry to the new Provincial league but continued to hold challenge meetings util 1964, when they joined the Metropolitan League. However, after 1964 the club closed for four years. The Eagles returned for the 1969 British League Division Two season.

=== 1970s ===
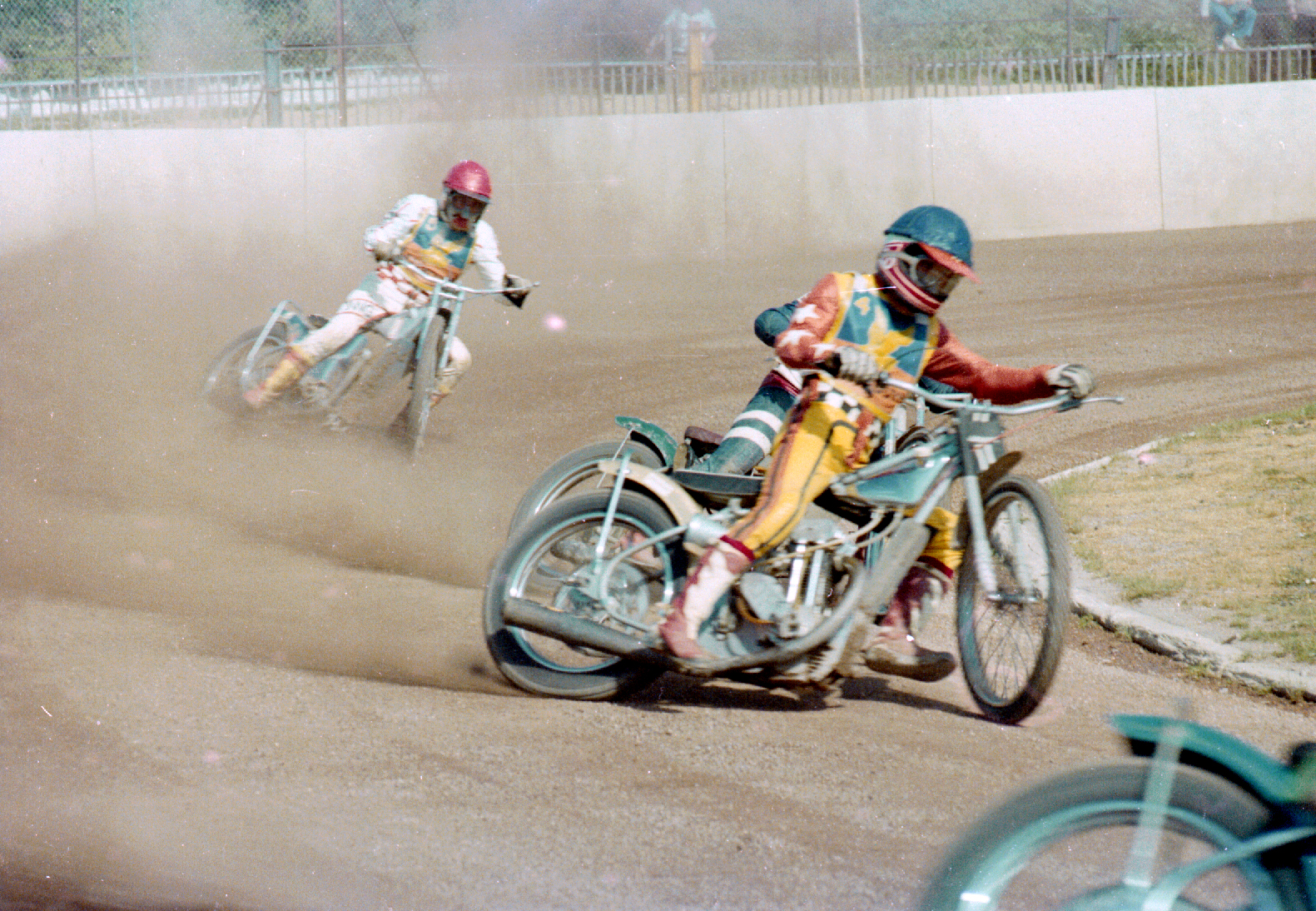
The Eagles in 1976

In 1971, the Eagles won silverware, winning the 1971 British League Division Two. Despite losing their leading rider Dave Jessup to division 1, Eastbourne triumphed by bringing in new signing Malcolm Ballard to support the Kennett brothers Gordon and Dave.

The club remained in division 2 until it was renamed the National League and they won their first Knockout Cups in 1975. They were National League champions in 1977 and won two more knockout Cups in 1977 and 1978 respectively. In 1979, the team stepped up to compete in the top division for the first time.

=== 1980s ===
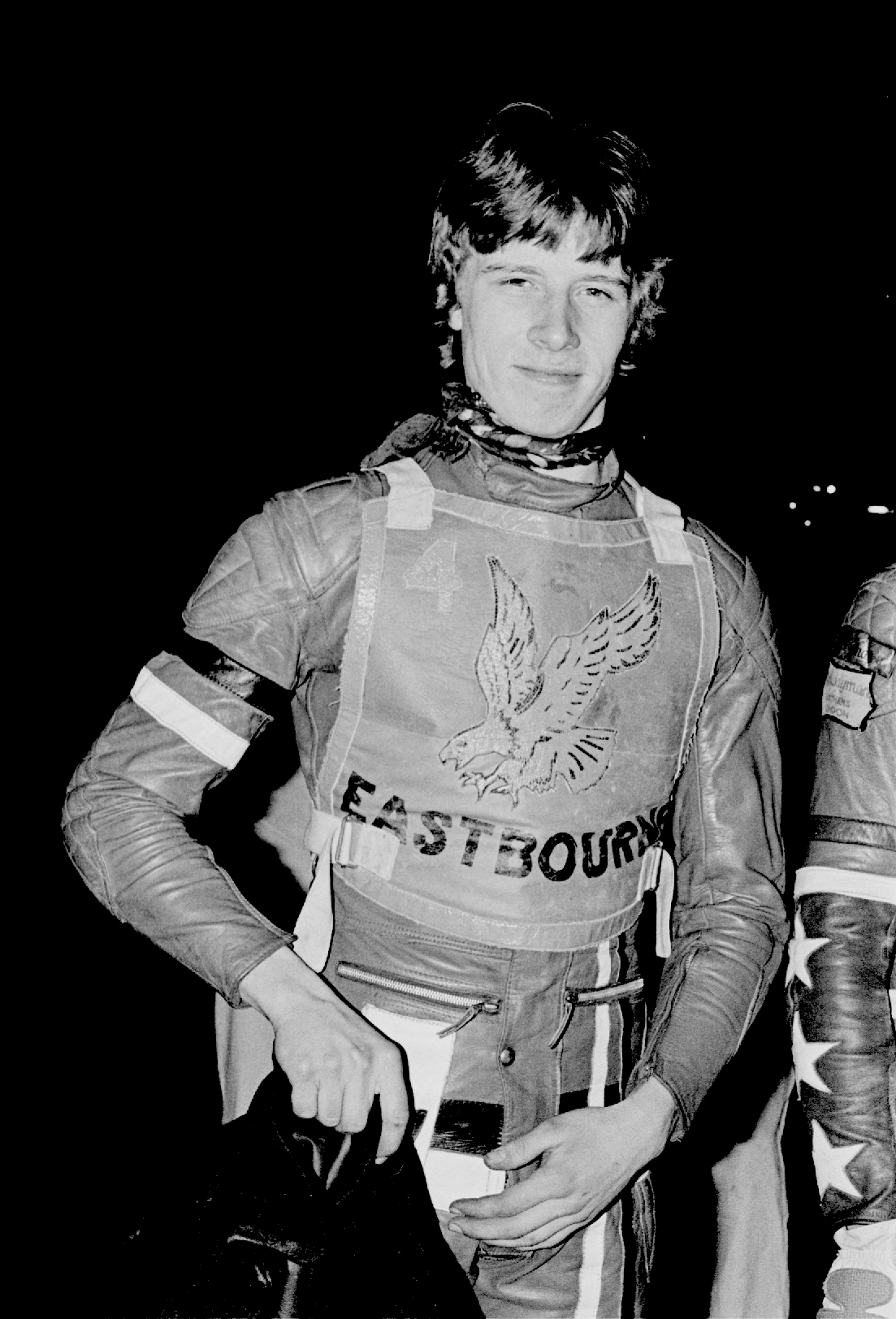
Colin Richardson

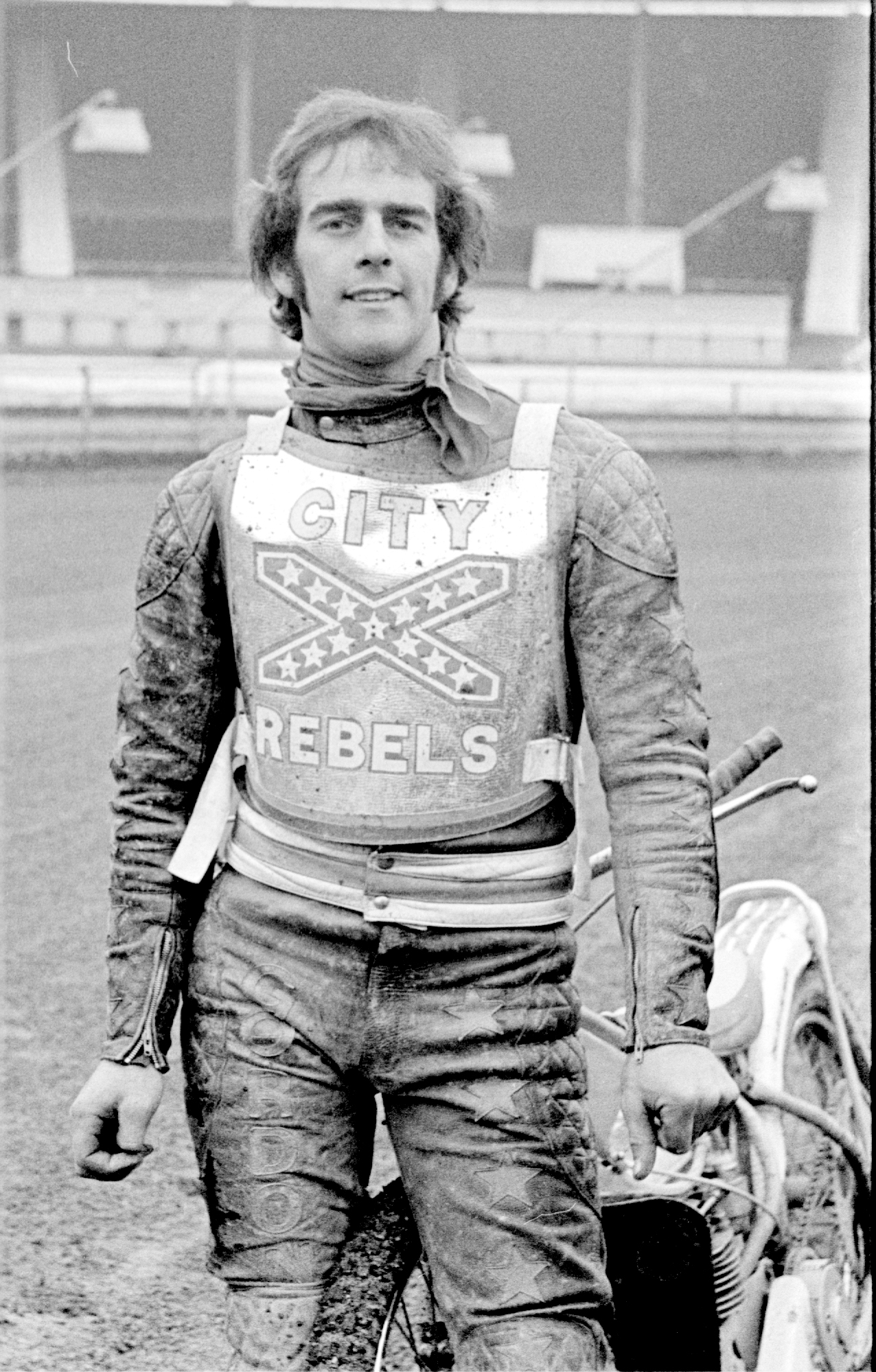
Gordon Kennett

After competing in the top division for six years, the Eagles dropped back down to the National League. Eastbourne achieved the 'double double' by winning the National League and Cup double in both 1986 and 1987. The team was spearheaded by Gordon Kennett, Martin Dugard and Colin Richardson.

=== 1990s ===
In 1991, the team returned to the top league and in 1994 they won their sixth Knockout Cup (but first in the top flight). The following season in 1995, Eastbourne won their first highest league title, after they won the 1995 Premier League speedway season. The gulf in quality of teams was evident after the merging of the two leagues, with the Eagles winning the title 56 points clear of bottom club Exeter Falcons. Eastbourne had been an easy runner-up the previous year to runaway winners Poole Pirates and retained four of their riders, Martin Dugard, Dean Barker, Stefan Dannö and Stefan Andersson, which provided enough firepower to seal the Championship.

After a second place finish and another top tier Knockout Cup win in 1997, the Eagles finished the decade with two mid-table finishes.

=== 2000s ===
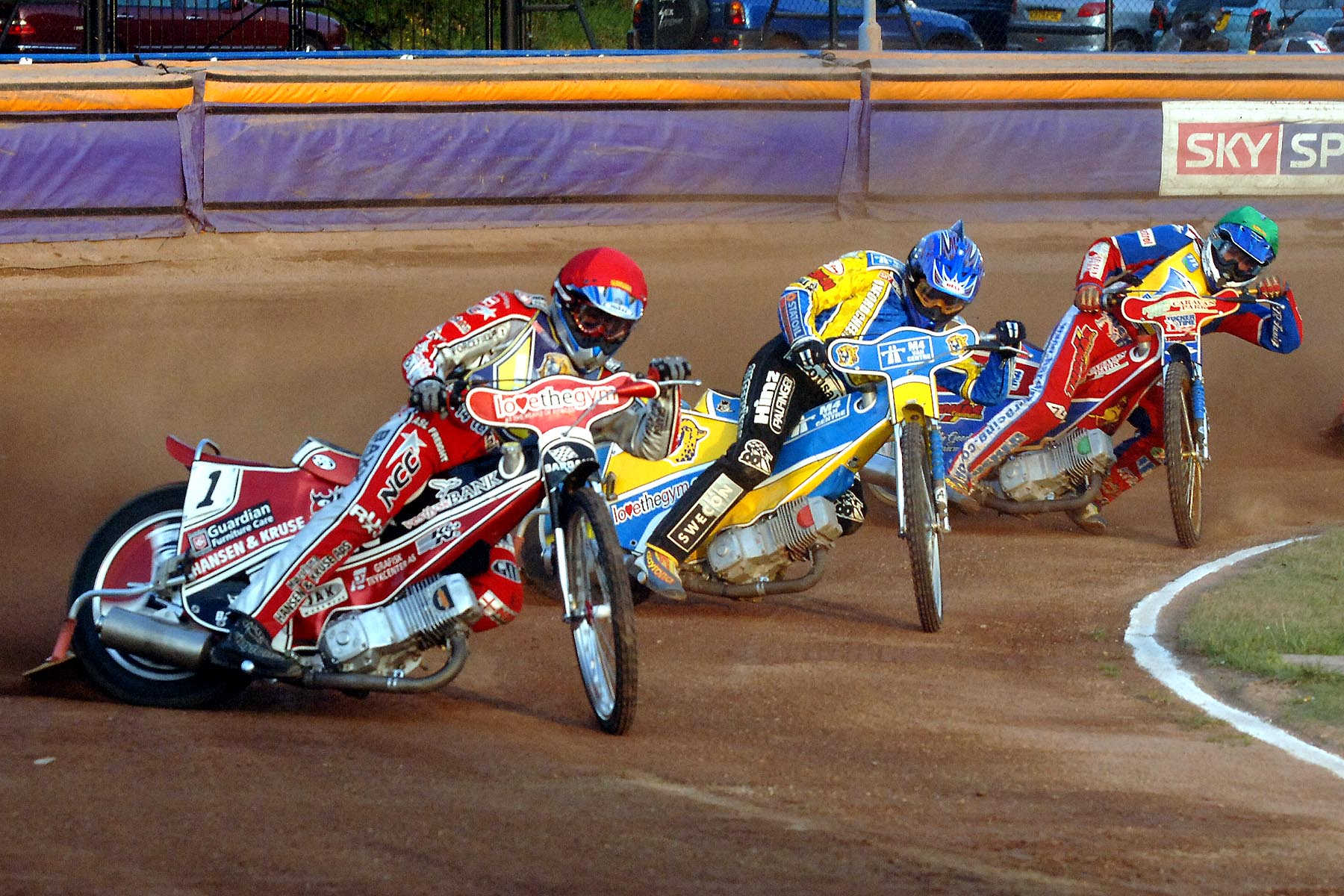
Eastbourne versus Oxford in 2007

The Eagles became the British champions for the second time after winning the 2000 Speedway Elite League, with Martin Dugard once again being the star for the team. They then topped the table in 2002 but lost the play off final, although consolation was gained by becoming Elite League Knockout Cup winners in 2002.

The Eagles continued to compete in the Elite League and won their fourth highest division Knockout Cup win in 2008.

=== 2010s ===
The Eagles competed in the top league for 24 consecutive seasons until the end of the 2014 season.

In 2015, the team joined the National League and gained success for four consecutive years, winning the third tier Knockout Cup four years running and winning the 2018 league title. The Eagles moved up to the second tier in 2019.

=== 2020s ===
After the leagues were cancelled in 2020 due to the COVID-19 pandemic, the Eagles competed in the SGB Championship 2021 (division 2) but withdrew from the league on 26 August because of financial problems. Their results were expunged as were the NDL results of their junior side called the Eastbourne Seagulls. The last match was held on 31 July 2021.

As of 2023, a consortium continued to search for a new venue to bring back speedway to Eastbourne and in 2024 the Arlington Staduium's owners (the Dugards) were approached to race NORA meetings.

== Notable riders ==
- (Sweden) Stefan Andersson
- (England) Malcolm Ballard
- (England) Dean Barker
- (Sweden) Stefan Dannö
- (England) Martin Dugard
- (England) Paul Gachet
- (Scotland) Ross Gilbertson
- (England) Colin Gooddy
- (England) Andy Grahame
- (England) Wally Green
- (Scotland) Jock Grierson
- (England) Dave Jessup
- (England) Gordon Kennett
- (England) Mark Loram
- (Wales) Leo McAuliffe
- (England) Neil Middleditch
- (United States) Kelly Moran
- (England) David Norris
- (Denmark) Nicki Pedersen
- (England) Colin Richardson
- (England) Joe Screen
- (England) Steve Weatherley

== Season summary ==
Extended content

Year and league	Position	Notes
1947 Speedway National League Division Three	1st	champions
1954 Southern Area League	5th	
1955 Southern Area League	4th	
1956 Southern Area League	2nd	
1957 Southern Area League	2nd	
1959 Southern Area League	1st	champions
1969 British League Division Two season	8th	
1970 British League Division Two season	2nd	
1971 British League Division Two season	1st	champions
1972 British League Division Two season	5th	
1973 British League Division Two season	3rd	
1974 British League Division Two season	2nd	
1975 New National League season	4th	Knockout Cup winners
1976 National League season	8th	
1977 National League season	1st	champions & Knockout Cup winners
1978 National League season	4th	Knockout Cup winners
1979 British League season	16th	
1980 British League season	16th	
1981 British League season	13th	
1982 British League season	12th	
1983 British League season	14th	
1984 British League season	11th	
1985 National League season	10th	
1986 National League season	1st	champions & Knockout Cup winners
1987 National League season	1st	champions & Knockout Cup winners
1988 National League season	3rd	
1989 National League season	7th	
1990 National League season	11th	
1991 British League season	12th	
1992 British League season	12th	
1993 British League season	3rd	
1994 British League season	2nd	Knockout Cup winners
1995 Premier League speedway season	1st	champions
1996 Premier League speedway season	3rd	
1997 Elite League speedway season	2nd	Knockout Cup winners
1998 Elite League speedway season	5th	
1999 Elite League speedway season	9th	
2000 Elite League speedway season	1st	champions
2001 Elite League speedway season	7th	
2002 Elite League speedway season	1st	PO final & Knockout Cup winners
2003 Elite League speedway season	6th	
2004 Elite League speedway season	4th	
2005 Elite League speedway season	4th	
2006 Elite League speedway season	9th	
2007 Elite League speedway season	7th	
2008 Elite League speedway season	5th	Knockout Cup winners
2009 Elite League speedway season	7th	Elite Shield
2010 Elite League speedway season	7th	
2011 Elite League speedway season	2nd	PO final
2012 Elite League speedway season	5th	
2013 Elite League speedway season	8th	
2014 Elite League speedway season	5th	
2015 National League speedway season	2nd	Knockout Cup winners
2016 National League speedway season	3rd	Knockout Cup winners
2017 National League speedway season	1st	PO final & Knockout Cup winners
2018 National League speedway season	2nd	champions (PO winners) & Knockout Cup winners
SGB Championship 2019	9th	
SGB Championship 2021	N/A	withdrew, results expunged

== Season summary (juniors) ==
Extended content

Year and league	Position	Notes
1996 Speedway Conference League	12th	Starlets
2021 National Development League speedway season	N/A	Seagulls, withdrew, results expunged

2021 season
the Seagulls were formed in February 2021 and disbanded in August 2021. This was the junior side of the Eagles. The Seagulls' first two signings for the season were Jake Knight and Richard Andrews, both returning to Arlington having ridden for the Eagles when they were in the National League. Club asset, and local youngster, Nathan Ablitt was then confirmed as one of the Seagulls' reserves starting on a 3.00 average. The Seagulls then completed the signings of Chad Wirtzfeld and Connor King, who both had previous National League experience with the Isle of Wight Warriors. Henry Atkins became the Seagulls' sixth signing, he raced for the Seagulls alongside riding for his SGB Championship team, the Plymouth Gladiators. Another local rider, Nick Laurence, was named as the Seagulls' second reserve and their final signing.

== Riders previous seasons ==
Extended content

2021 team

- (England) Richard Lawson
- (England) Edward Kennett
- (England) Lewis Kerr
- (England) Tom Brennan
- (England) Kyle Newman
- (England) Drew Kemp
- (England) Nathan Ablitt

2019 team

- (England) Edward Kennett
- (England) Richard Lawson
- (England) Lewis Kerr
- (England) Kyle Newman
- (England) Georgie Wood
- (England) Alfie Bowtell
- (England) Jason Edwards
- (England) Tom Brennan (Note: Tom Brennan was replaced in the team by Kyle Newman on 21 May 2019.)
- (England) Ben Morley (Note: Ben Morley was replaced in the team by Jason Edwards on 16 July 2019.)

2018 team

- (England) Georgie Wood
- (England) Mark Baseby
- (England) Tom Brennan
- (England) Jason Edwards
- (Germany) Ethan Spiller
- (England) Charley Powell
- (England) Charlie Brooks
- (England) Kelsey Dugard (Note: Kelsey Dugard was replaced in the team by Ethan Spiller on 27 July 2018.)

2017 team

- (England) Josh Bailey
- (England) Jake Knight
- (England) Georgie Wood
- (England) Tom Brennan
- (England) Charley Powell
- (England) Mattie Bates
- (England) Charlie Saunders
- (England) Kelsey Dugard (Note: Kelsey Dugard and Connor Coles were replaced in the team by Matt Saul and Jake Knight on 2 June 2017.)
- (England) Connor Coles
- (England) Matt Saul (Note: Matt Saul was replaced in the team by Charlie Saunders on 3 August 2017.)
- (England) Mark Baseby (Note: Mark Baseby was replaced in the team by Josh Bailey on 23 August 2017.)

2016 team

- (England) Adam Ellis
- (England) Jake Knight
- (England) Ellis Perks
- (England) Georgie Wood
- (England) Gary Cottham
- (England) Charley Powell
- (England) Luke Harris

2015 team

- (New Zealand) Bradley Wilson-Dean
- (England) Ben Hopwood
- (England) Marc Owen
- (Germany) Daniel Spiller
- (England) Georgie Wood
- (England) Richard Andrews
- (England) Kelsey Dugard

2014 team

- (Denmark) Bjarne Pedersen
- (Australia) Cameron Woodward
- (Finland) Joonas Kylmäkorpi
- (Denmark) Mikkel Michelsen
- (Finland) Timo Lahti
- (England) Lewis Blackbird
- (England) Danny Halsey

2013 team

- (Denmark) Bjarne Pedersen
- (Australia) Cameron Woodward
- (Czech Republic) Lukáš Dryml
- (Sweden) Kim Nilsson
- (Sweden) Simon Gustafsson
- (Denmark) Mikkel Michelsen
- (Finland) Timo Lahti

2012 team

- (Finland) Joonas Kylmäkorpi
- (Sweden) Simon Gustafsson
- (Finland) Timo Lahti
- (England) Lewis Bridger
- (Australia) Cameron Woodward
- (Czech Republic) Lukáš Dryml
- (Russia) Denis Gizatullin

== See also ==
- Hastings Saxons
