= Northampton Shaleway =

Sports venue in the UK

Coordinates: 52°11′53″N 0°48′6″W

- Interactive map of Northampton Shaleway
- Location: Brafield/Horton Road, Northamptonshire NN7 2BA
- Owner: Deane Wood
- Operator: Incarace (Spedeworth Group)
- Surface: Shale

Construction
- Opened: 31 March 1939

Northampton Shaleway also known as Brafield, is used for BriSCA F1 Stock Cars, BriSCA Formula 2 Stock Cars, V8 Hotstox, and various other forms of oval motor sport including National Hot Rods, Banger racing, Saloon Stock Cars, Ministox and Rebels. It also briefly hosted speedway and greyhound racing, with the former returning in 2026.

== Location and history ==
It is located 4 miles south east of Northampton between Brafield-on-the-Green and Horton on the Brafield/Horton Road, Northamptonshire, England. It hosts BriSCA F1 and F2 Stock Car Racing from March through to November. The Tarmac Oval and Figure of 8 track is 396 metres (1,299 ft) in length and surrounded by a steel plate fence. Brafield was originally built in 1949 by Dave Hughes who promoted Skirrow Midget Racing. The track was purchased by John La Trobe in 1955 and the first Stock Car event was held on 15 August 1955. The track was concrete surfaced in 1959. The track was sold to Tom Blissett in 1989, who also owned the Lydden Hill Race Circuit . The track was then sold on to John Heynes in the winter of 1996/97. He got sick of all the politics involved in the sport and leased the track to Incarace.

During the 2018 season, following the closure of the shale Midlands track Coventry, Deane Wood, owner of Incarace, took advice from fellow ORCi shale promoters to convert Northampton International Raceway to a shale track. After an initial period of mixed results (resulting from the extended dry spell and drought, followed by weeks of torrential rain), the track is now fully converted to shale. Following the conversion, the track is now known as the Northampton Shaleway, and continues to host World Qualifying rounds for BriSCA F1, BriSCA F2, National Saloon Stock Cars and National Bangers, along with the European championship and Masters championship for the BriSCA F1 Stock Cars.

== Stock car racing ==
The BriSCA Formula 1 Stock Cars World Championship has been held here twice, in 2005 the first time it was held it was won by Frankie Jnr Wainman, and in 2011 by Paul Harrison. Since 1994 the European Championships have been held at Northampton, usually over a weekend in July, and includes a large influx of Drivers and fans from the Netherlands. The BriSCA F2 World Championship Race has been held at Northampton 7 times. First held in 1966 - Steve Bateman, 1969 - Ron Innocent, 1971 - Dave Brown, 1981 - Bill Batten, 1996 - Rob Speak, 2001 - Daz Kitson, and 2005 - H24 - Willie Peters (the Netherlands). The F2 European has been held here over the same weekend as the F1's since 1997.

== Speedway ==
Brafield first staged Speedway in 1954. The Brafield Flying-Foxes, lined up in the Southern Area League (division 3 at the time). the team finished fourth during the 1954 Southern Area League. The following season they finished in 3rd position in the 1955 Southern Area League, collecting twelve of the available twenty-four points. And that was it at Brafield until the circuit reopened in 1966. This time the circuit was granted an open licence and concentrated on providing opportunities for youngsters and older riders that couldn't quite hold down British League places. The team was renamed the Brafield Badgers and interspersed individual meetings with matches against reserve sides from British League tracks. The Speedway closed for good at the end of the 1967 season.

A new speedway team called Northampton Foxes will race at the Raceway during the 2026 SGB Premiership.

== Greyhound racing ==
A greyhound racing track, was opened on 8 April 1950. The racing was independent (not affiliated to the sports governing body the National Greyhound Racing Club) known as a flapping track, which was the nickname given to independent tracks. The greyhound racing was promoted by H Beaumont who had switched his operation from the Yardley Hastings track. The date of closure is not known.
