= Arlington Stadium, Hailsham =

British speedway venue

Arlington Stadium
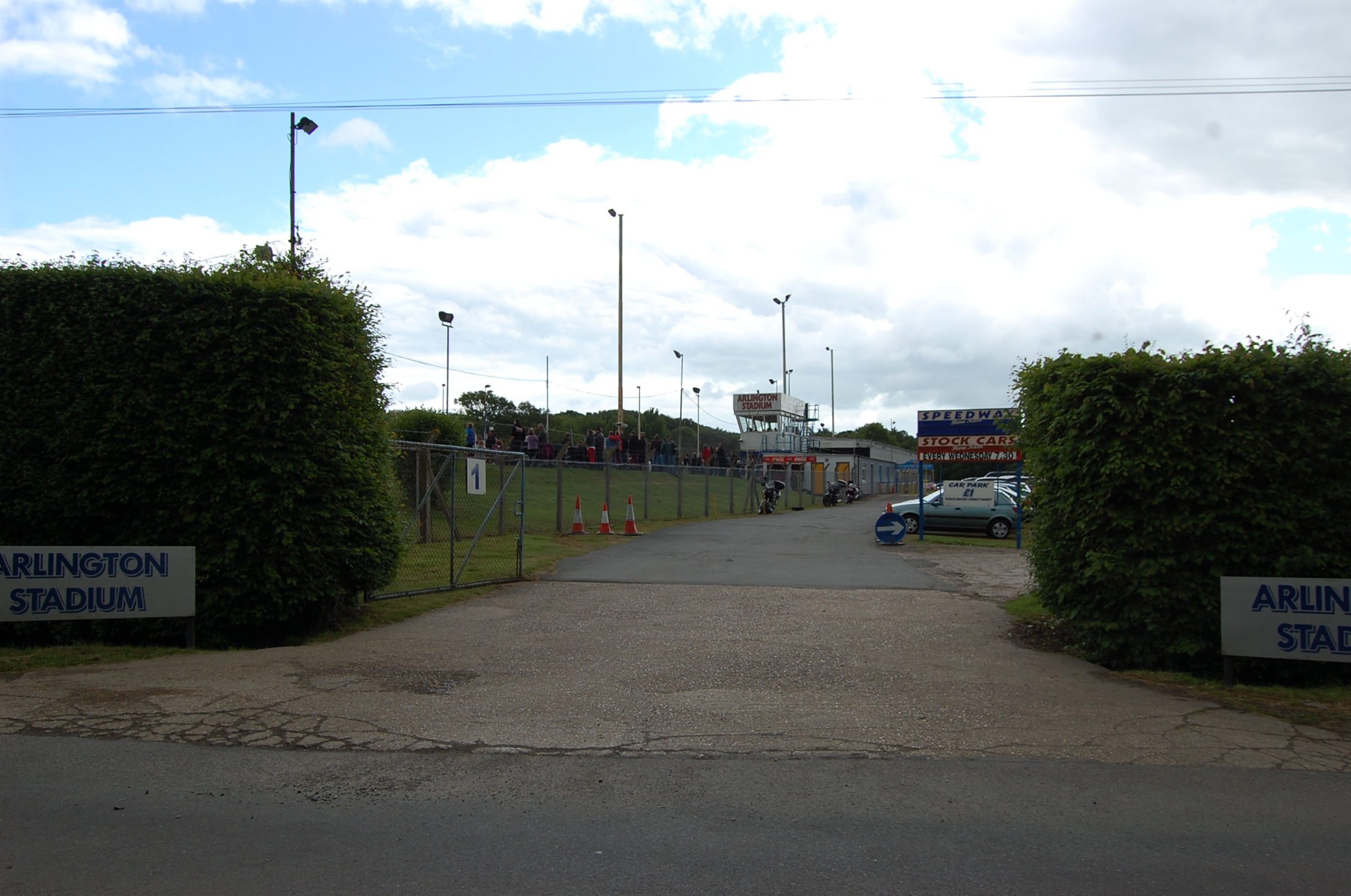
- Location: Arlington Road West, Hailsham, East Sussex, BN27 3RD
- Coordinates: 50°51′29″N 0°13′40″E
- Major events: Stock car racing formerly Speedway

Oval

Arlington Stadium is a sports stadium on Arlington Road West, Hailsham, East Sussex. The stadium was mainly used for Stock car racing and was also formerly used for motorcycle speedway as the home track for the Eastbourne Eagles.

== History ==
Opened in 1929, the land was purchased for £100 and stadium built by volunteers from the Eastbourne Motorcycle Club.

In 1938, several midget car race meetings (nicknamed doodle bugs) took place around the track.

Stock Car events have been regularly occurring since 1955.

On 23 July 2011, the infamous 'All Westy Night took place at Arlington Stadium, which drew criticism from car enthusiasts as over 100 Austin Westminsters were written off. The owners of the stadium at that time responded by saying that most, if not all the cars were not roadworthy.

In 2023, it was announced that the venue would not be available for speedway in the future.

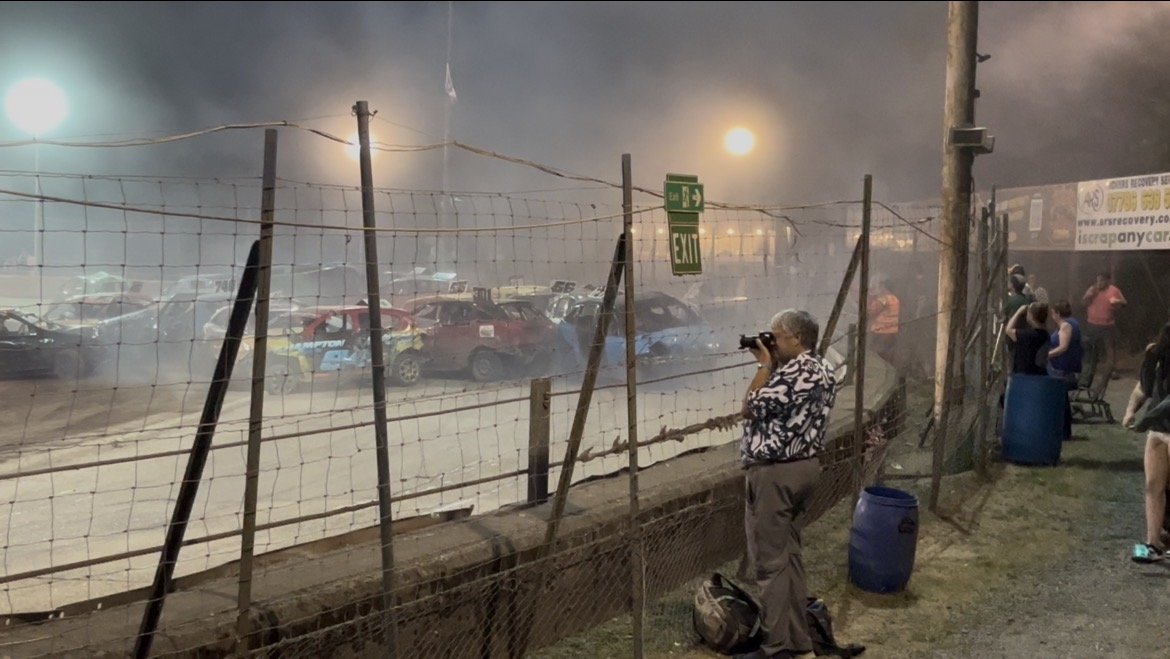
1600 bangers at Arlington Stadium

On 6 August 2026, Spedeworth Motorsport, the organisers of the racing at the stadium, announced that the owners of the stadium had asked them to cease all events with immediate effect. Stock car racing will re-commence Saturday 14 November 2026.

== See also ==
- Eastbourne Eagles
