= Rye House Rockets =

British motorcycle speedway team

Club information
- Track address: Rye House Stadium; Rye Road; Hoddesdon; Hertfordshire; EN11 0EH
- Country: England
- Founded: 1934
- Closed: 2018

Club facts
- Colours: Black, Chrome and Orange
- Track size: 262 metres (287 yd)
- Track record time: 54.7 seconds
- Track record date: 1 August 2015
- Track record holder: Robert Lambert

Major team honours
National/Premier League champions (tier 2)	1980, 2005, 2007
National League KO Cup winners (tier 2)	1979
Premier Trophy winners (tier 2)	2005
Southern Area League Champions (tier 3)	1955, 1956
Southern Area League Cup Winners (tier 3)	1956

The Rye House Rockets were a speedway team based at Rye House Stadium, Hoddesdon, England. They competed in various British speedway leagues from 1954 to 2018.

== History ==
=== Origins & 1930s ===
Rye House began life in 1934, hosting open meetings on a circuit that had been converted from a former running track. Under the charge of the Harringay Light Car and Motor Cycle Club, the track soon became known as a training school for riders. The first Rye House team competed in several challenge matches throughout 1936.

Whilst at Hackney in September 1937, Dicky Case purchased the lease of the sixty acre estate of Rye House and continued the training school at Rye House Stadium, operating under the name of the Hackney Motor Club. The school operated until 1938, when a Rye House team staged Sunday Dirt-track League matches. In 1939, various challenge matches were held.

=== 1940s ===
Rye House stadium continued to operate speedway from 1940 to 1943, despite the disruption caused by World War II. After the end of the war the track was re-opened by Arthur Elvin (the Wembley Stadium Managing Director) and was once again used as a training school, this time for the Wembly Lions riders. The site remained under the lease ownership of Dicky Case until he returned to his native Australia. It was the foremost venue for aspiring speedway riders throughout the decade.

=== 1950s ===
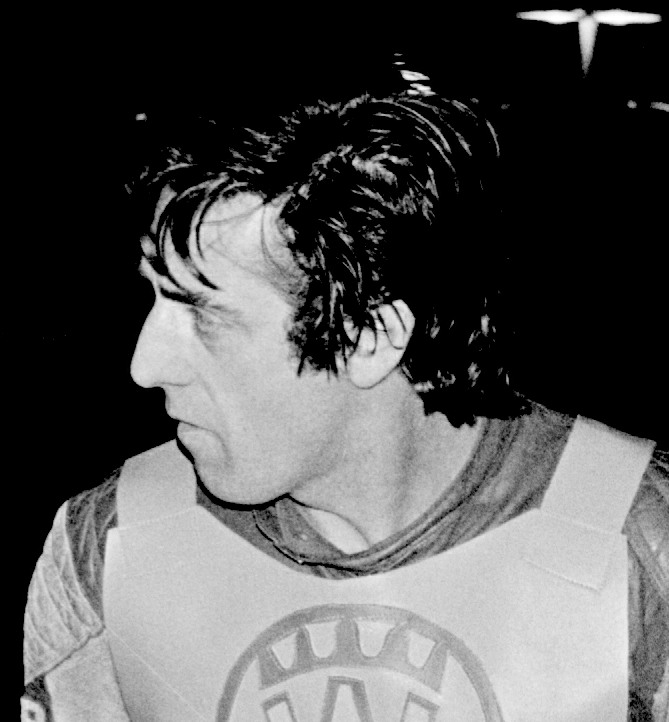
Mike Broadbank

The team competed in a league for the first time since 1938, when they joined the 1954 Southern Area League (the third tier of British speedway). Riding as the Rye House Roosters they finished third in a six team league. The team then won two league titles; the 1955 Southern Area League and the 1956 Southern Area League. The team was led by Mike Broadbank, who also won the Riders' Championship at Rye House on 25 September.

=== 1960s ===
In 1960, Jack Carter agreed a lease with stadium owner L. H. Lawrence and the speedway track was rebuilt by Mike Broadbank, along with his father Alfred. Broadbank ran the speedway team known as the Red Devils who raced in challenge matches from 1960 until 1966. No public meetings were held in 1967 or 1968, although the training school continued; but public speedway resumed in 1969, with a combination of individual meetings and team challenge matches, and continued until 1973.

=== 1970s ===
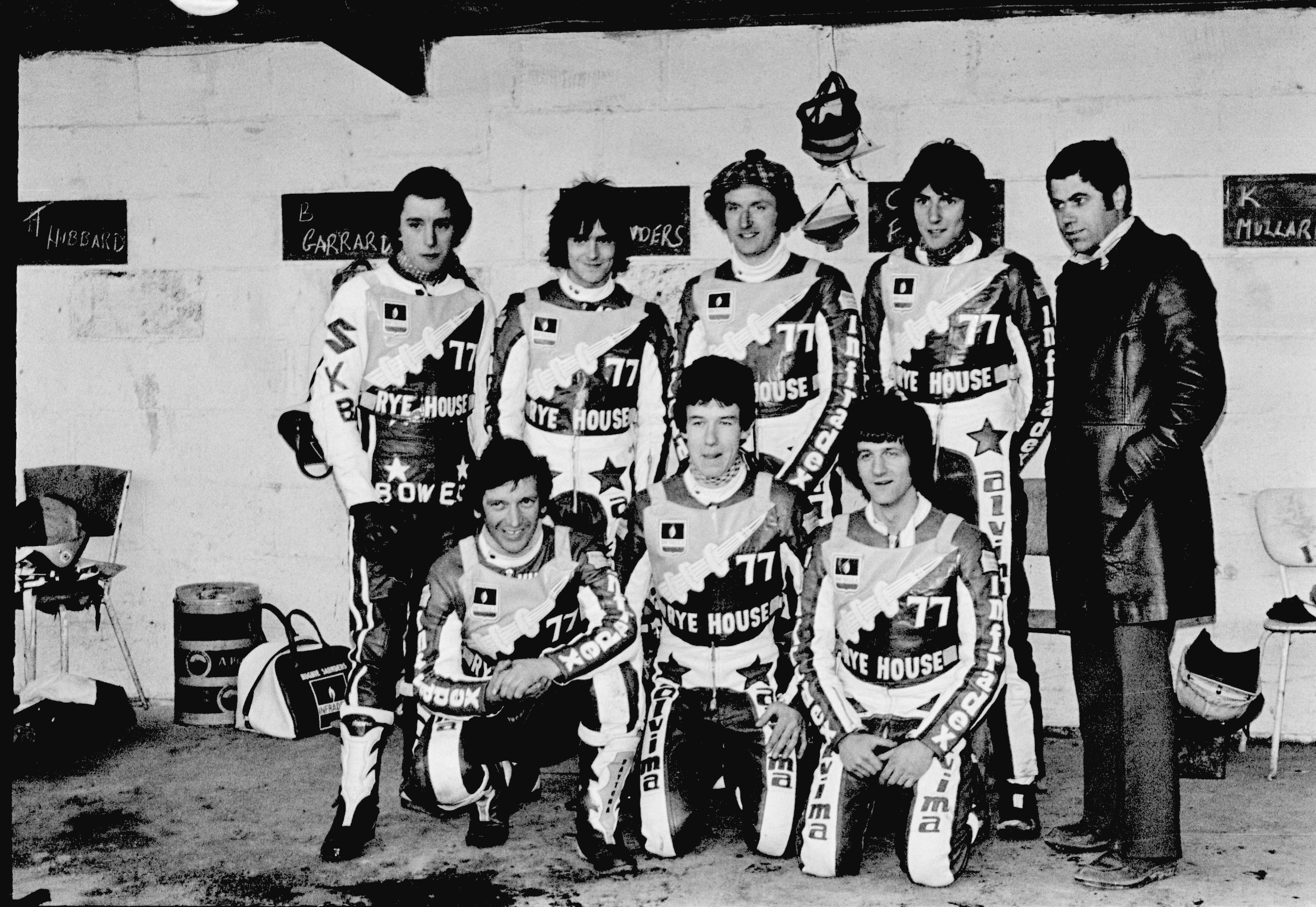
The Rockets in 1976

In 1974, Rayleigh Rockets closed down but the promotion, riders and nickname moved to Rye House. It was the first season of league speedway at Rye House since the 1959 Southern Area League. After struggling for two seasons they progressed to 5th place in 1976 before competing for the title from 1977 to 1979 and winning the 1979 Knockout Cup.

=== 1980s ===
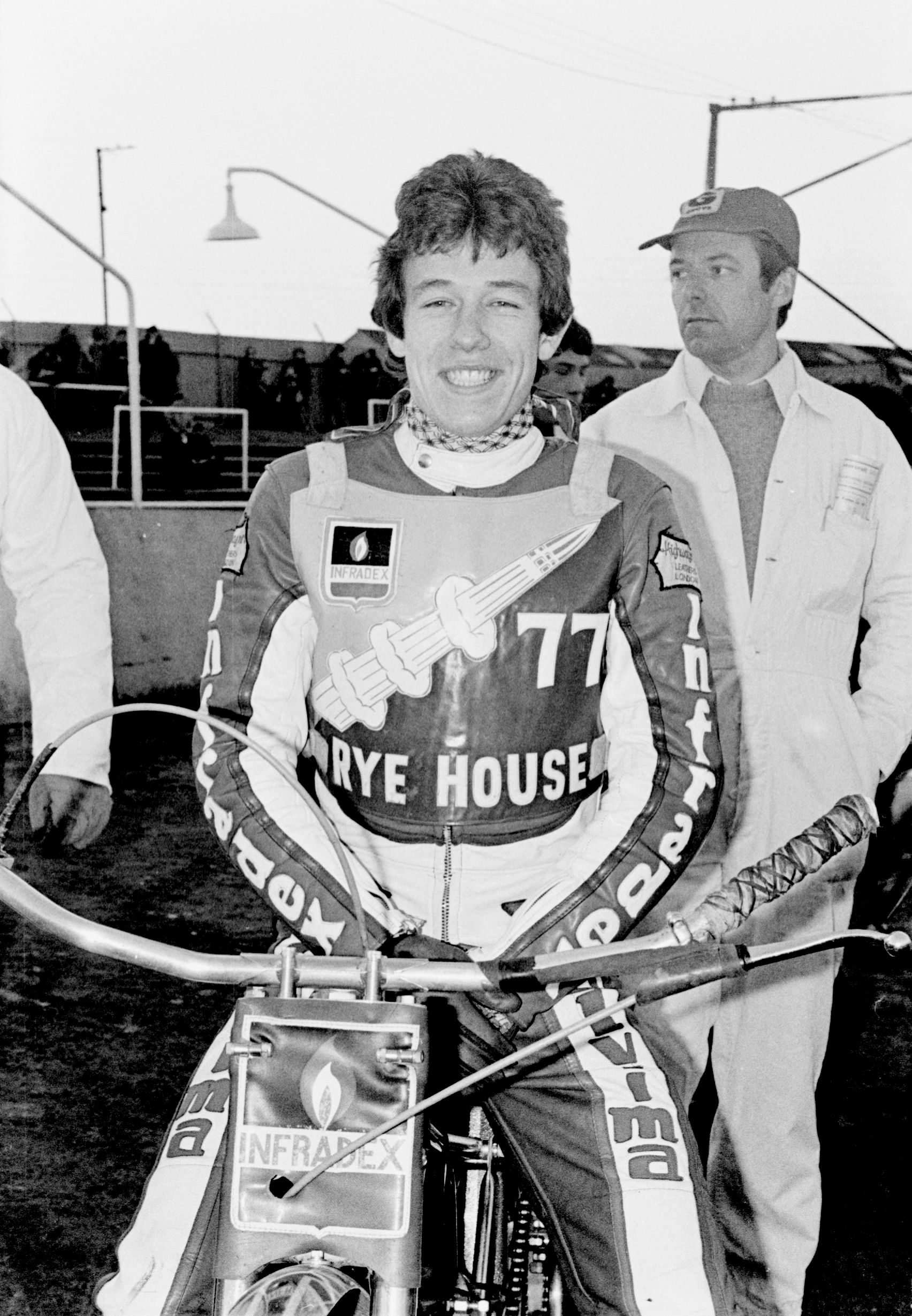
Karl Fiala

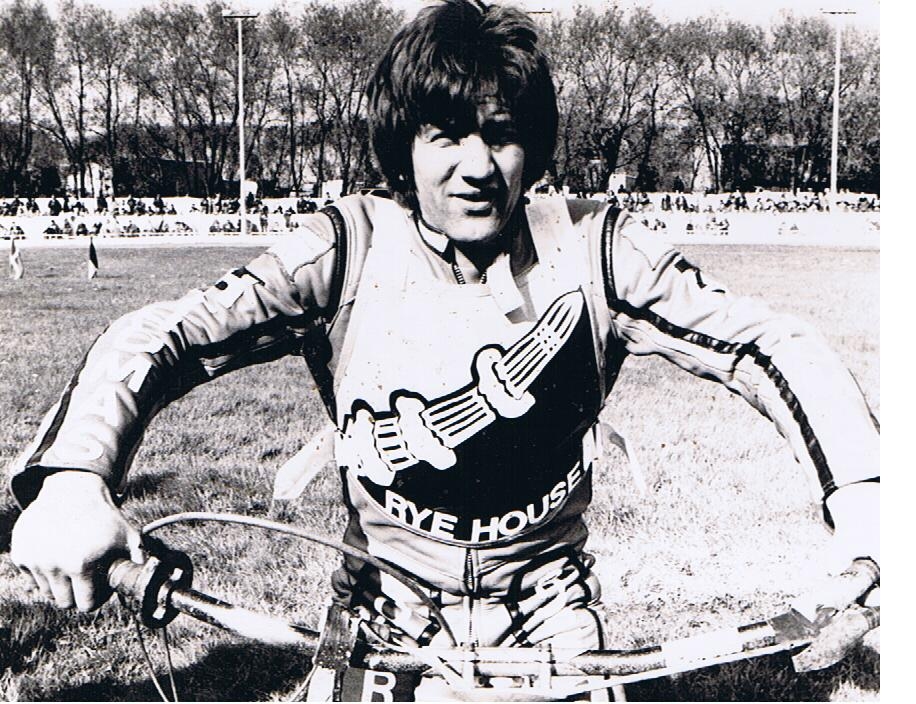
Kelvin Mullarkey

The consistency and stability of the team paid dividends in 1980, when the Rockets won the 1980 National League. Bobby Garrad, Karl Fiala and Kelvin Mullarkey all averaged over nine for the season.

The success could not be repeated for the rest of the decade as the team experienced mediocrity.

=== 1990s ===
After finishing 8th during the 1993 British League Division Two season the promoters Roger Shute and Peter Redfern left the club leaving Ronnie Russell in sole charge. Russell failed to secure the necessary funding to continue and the Rockets were disbanded.

In 1999, the team returned to league action in the Conference League (the 3rd division) but they soon moved up to division 2 in 2002 and formed a junior side called the Raiders' to compete in the Conference League. The Raiders won the Conference League Four-Team Championship in 2003.

After three years of competing in the Premier League from 2002 to 2004, the Rockets re-signed Edward Kennett and together with Stuart Robson, Chris Neath, Brent Werner, they helped secure the Premier League title. Two years later, Robson and Neath were still part of the Rockets team that won another league title. The 2007 team included new signing Tai Woffinden.

In 2008, the junior team were renamed the Cobras.

=== 2010s ===
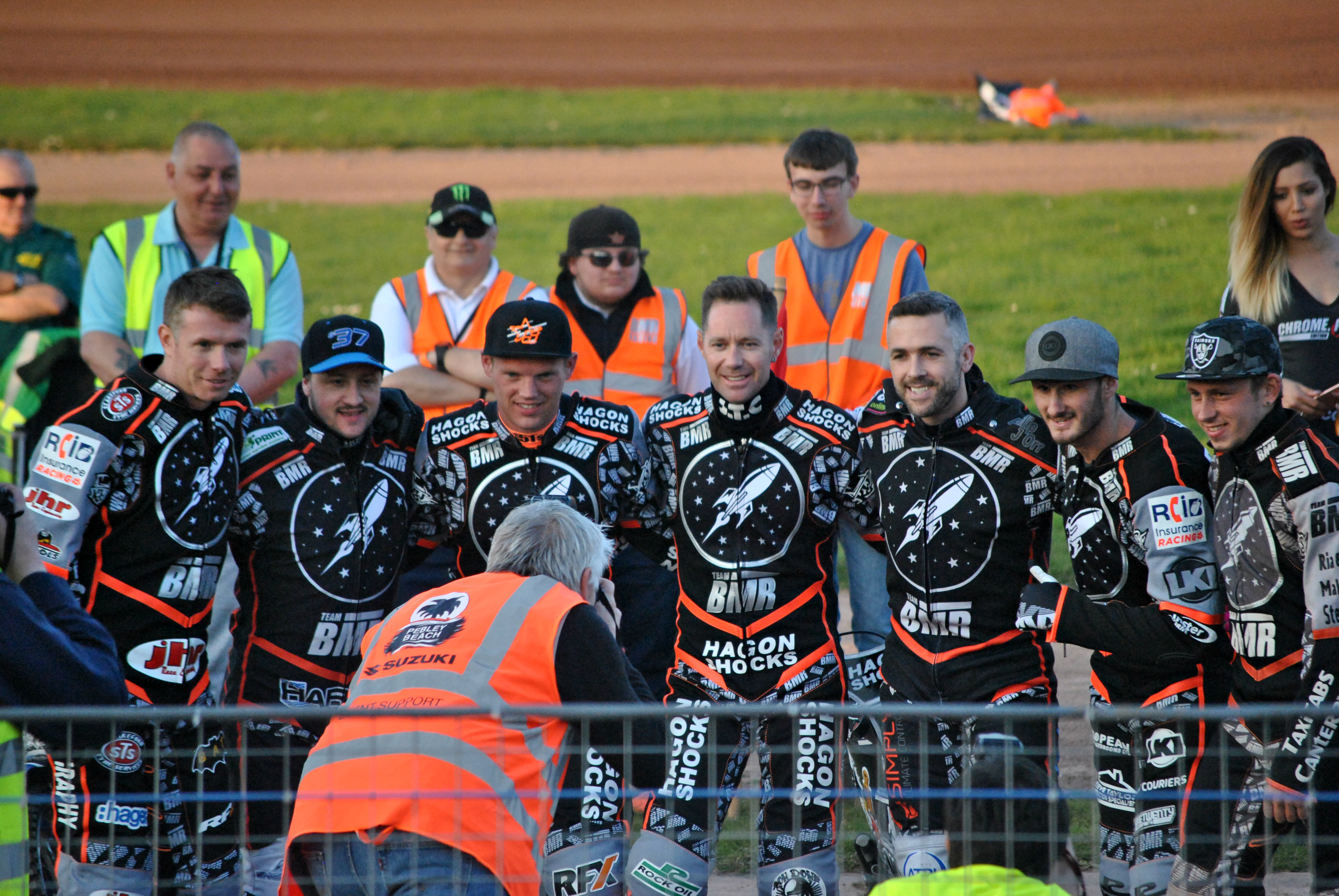
The Rockets line up for the 2017 season

The Rockets continued to compete in the Premier League from 2010 to 2016 before entering the highest tier of British speedway for the first time in their history for the 2017 season. The team competed in the SGB Premiership and featured riders such as Chris Harris and Scott Nicholls. Mid-way through the 2018 season the Rockets results were annulled by the Speedway Control Bureau, due to the teams withdrawal due to financial issues.

In September 2018, the Lakeside Hammers, a speedway team in the SGB Championship, moved to the Rye House Stadium, following the closure of the Arena Essex Raceway.

=== 2020s ===
In December 2020, the Rye House stadium remains in a legal quagmire, however there are a few Rocket fan groups fighting to once again see the Rockets team race at the iconic track.

== Riders ==
=== Rider of the year ===
- 2002: (England) David Mason
- 2003: (England) Scott Robson
- 2004: (England) Tommy Allen
- 2005: (England) Stuart Robson
- 2006: (England) Steve Boxall
- 2007: (England) Tai Woffinden
- 2008: (England) Luke Bowen
- 2009: (England) Luke Bowen
- 2010: (Sweden) Linus Sundstrom
- 2011: (England) Chris Neath
- 2012: (England) Jason Garrity
- 2013: (Australia) Tyson Nelson
- 2014: (England) Edward Kennett
- 2015: (England) Edward Kennett
- 2016: (England) Stuart Robson
- 2017: (England) Scott Nicholls

=== Notable riders ===
- (England) Brian Brett
- (England) Mike Broadbank
- (England) Marvyn Cox
- (England) Karl Fiala
- (England) Bob Garrad
- (England) Martin Goodwin
- (England) Chris Harris
- (England) Ted Hubbard
- (England) Edward Kennett
- (England) Kelvin Mullarkey
- (England) Chris Neath
- (England) Scott Nicholls
- (England) Ashley Pullen
- (Denmark) Jens Rasmussen
- (England) Stuart Robson
- (England) Hugh Saunders
- (England) Andrew Silver
- (England) Kevin Smith
- (England) Tai Woffinden

== Season summary ==
Extended content

Year and league	Position	Notes
1938 Sunday Dirt-Track League	4th	
1954 Southern Area League	3rd	rode as Rye House Roosters
1955 Southern Area League	1st	Champions
1956 Southern Area League	1st	Champions & cup winners
1957 Southern Area League	3rd	
1959 Southern Area League	4th	
1974 British League Division Two season	16th	
1975 New National League season	14th	
1976 National League season	5th	
1977 National League season	2nd	
1978 National League season	3rd	
1979 National League season	2nd	Knockout Cup winners
1980 National League season	1st	Champions
1981 National League season	16th	
1982 National League season	6th	
1983 National League season	11th	
1984 National League season	8th	
1985 National League season	13th	
1986 National League season	11th	
1987 National League season	16th	
1988 National League season	14th	
1989 National League season	14th	
1990 National League season	15th	
1991 British League Division Two season	9th	
1992 British League Division Two season	5th	
1993 British League Division Two season	8th	
1999 Speedway Conference League	4th	
2000 Speedway Conference League	6th	
2001 Speedway Conference League	4th	
2002 Premier League speedway season	13th	
2002 Speedway Conference League	4th	Raiders (junior side)
2003 Premier League speedway season	14th	
2003 Speedway Conference League	2nd	Raiders (junior side)
2004 Premier League speedway season	6th	
2004 Speedway Conference League	2nd	Raiders (junior side)
2005 Premier League speedway season	1st	Champions
2005 Speedway Conference League	6th	Raiders (junior side)
2006 Premier League speedway season	4th	
2006 Speedway Conference League	3rd	Raiders (junior side)
2007 Premier League speedway season	3rd	Champions (play off winners)
2007 Speedway Conference League	6th	Raiders (junior side)
2008 Premier League speedway season	4th	
2008 Speedway Conference League	7th	Cobras (junior side)
2009 Premier League speedway season	9th	
2009 National League speedway season	10th	Cobras (junior side)
2010 Premier League speedway season	5th	
2010 National League speedway season	4th	Cobras (junior side)
2011 Premier League speedway season	8th	
2012 Premier League speedway season	11th	
2013 Premier League speedway season	9th	
2014 Premier League speedway season	13th	
2015 Premier League speedway season	12th	
2016 Premier League speedway season	9th	
SGB Premiership 2017	5th	
SGB Premiership 2018	N/A	record annulled
