= Ross Gilbertson =

British speedway rider

- Born: 2 February 1931; Ayton, Scottish Borders, Scotland
- Died: 8 February 2009 (aged 78); Wareham, Dorset, England
- Nationality: British (Scottish)

Career history
- 1954–1956: California Poppies
- 1957: Aldershot Shots
- 1958, 1960–1961: Southampton Saints
- 1959–1961, 1973: Eastbourne Eagles
- 1960–1965, 1969: Poole Pirates
- 1969, 1970: Rochester/Romford Bombers
- 1969, 1971: Exeter Falcons
- 1970: Newport Wasps
- 1971–1972: Canterbury Crusaders

Individual honours
- 1960: Southern Area League Riders' Champion

Team honours
- 1954, 1959: Southern Area League
- 1961, 1962: Provincial League
- 1962, 1963, 1964: Provincial Southern League

Vernon Walter Ross Gilbertson (2 February 1931 – 8 February 2009) was a motorcycle speedway rider from Scotland.

== Career ==
Gilbertson started racing in the British leagues during the 1954 Southern Area League, when riding for the California Poppies and helped them win the league title. He rode for California during both the 1955 and 1956 seasons, improving his average significantly to 9.00 in 1956.

In 1957, California switched its promotion to Aldershot Shots and Gilbertson recorded an even better average of 9.30. This led to him being signed by Southampton Saints in the top league for the 1958 Speedway National League. He also doubled up for Eastbourne Eagles in the Southern Area League, where he helped the south coast club win the league title in 1959. In 1960, he rode for Southampton in the National League, Poole Pirates in the Provincial League and won the Southern Area League Riders' Championship representing Eastbourne.

Gilbertson proved to be a leading rider, particularly in the Provincial League and added two more league titles in 1961 and 1962, helping Poole to succeed and gain the nickname 'The Flying Scotsman'. He recorded 1,707 points in 196 matches for Poole and also won the Championship of Sussex in 1961.

Gilbertson continued to ride for Poole until the end of the 1965 British League season but then retired. However, he then returned four years in 1969, riding for Rochester/Romford Bombers in division 2 and produced a remarkable 10.10 average during his return season, while also doubling up with Exeter Falcons in division 1. He also set a track record at the Seedhill Stadium.

After the 1970 season with Romford, Gilbertson joined Canterbury Crusaders and topped the team averages during both the 1971 and 1972 seasons.
