= Leo McAuliffe =

Welsh motorcycle speedway rider

- Born: 16 December 1933; Clydach, Swansea
- Died: 13 December 2017 (aged 83)
- Nationality: British (Welsh)

Career history
- 1956-1957: Eastbourne Eagles
- 1957: Birmingham Brummies
- 1957: Bradford Tudors
- 1957: Southern Rovers
- 1958: Southampton Saints
- 1959, 1964: Swindon Robins
- 1960–1961: New Cross Rangers
- 1962–1964: Wimbledon Dons
- 1965: Belle Vue Aces
- 1965: Cradley Heathens
- 1967–1969: Oxford Cheetahs

Individual honours
- 1963: Speedway World Championship finalist
- 1956, 1957: Southern Area League Riders' Championship

Team honours
- 1962: National Trophy winner
- 1962: National League KO Cup winner
- 1957: Southern Area League

Leo Peter McAuliffe (16 December 1933 – 13 December 2017) was an international motorcycle speedway rider from Wales. He earned one international cap for the Great Britain national speedway team.

== Biography ==
McAuliffe was born in 1933 in the village of Clydach near Swansea. In 1948, he moved to Pontardawe and appeared in court following a motorcycle offence where the magistrate suggested that he find an appropriate place for his motorcycling. After moving to London, he began training at Rye House and gained his first contract with Eastbourne Eagles.

McAuliffe won the Southern Area League Riders' Championship, held at Rye House Stadium on 30 September 1956.

Later, McAuliffe became a protege of fellow Welshman Freddie Williams and went on to ride in the top tier of British Speedway for various clubs. He joined Oxford Cheetahs in 1967.

McAuliffe's greatest moment came when he reached the final of the Speedway World Championship in the 1963 Individual Speedway World Championship. He was capped by Great Britain just once.

== World final appearances ==
=== Individual World Championship ===
- 1963 - (England) London, Wembley Stadium - 8th - 7pts
