= Colin Gooddy =

British speedway rider (1933–2019)

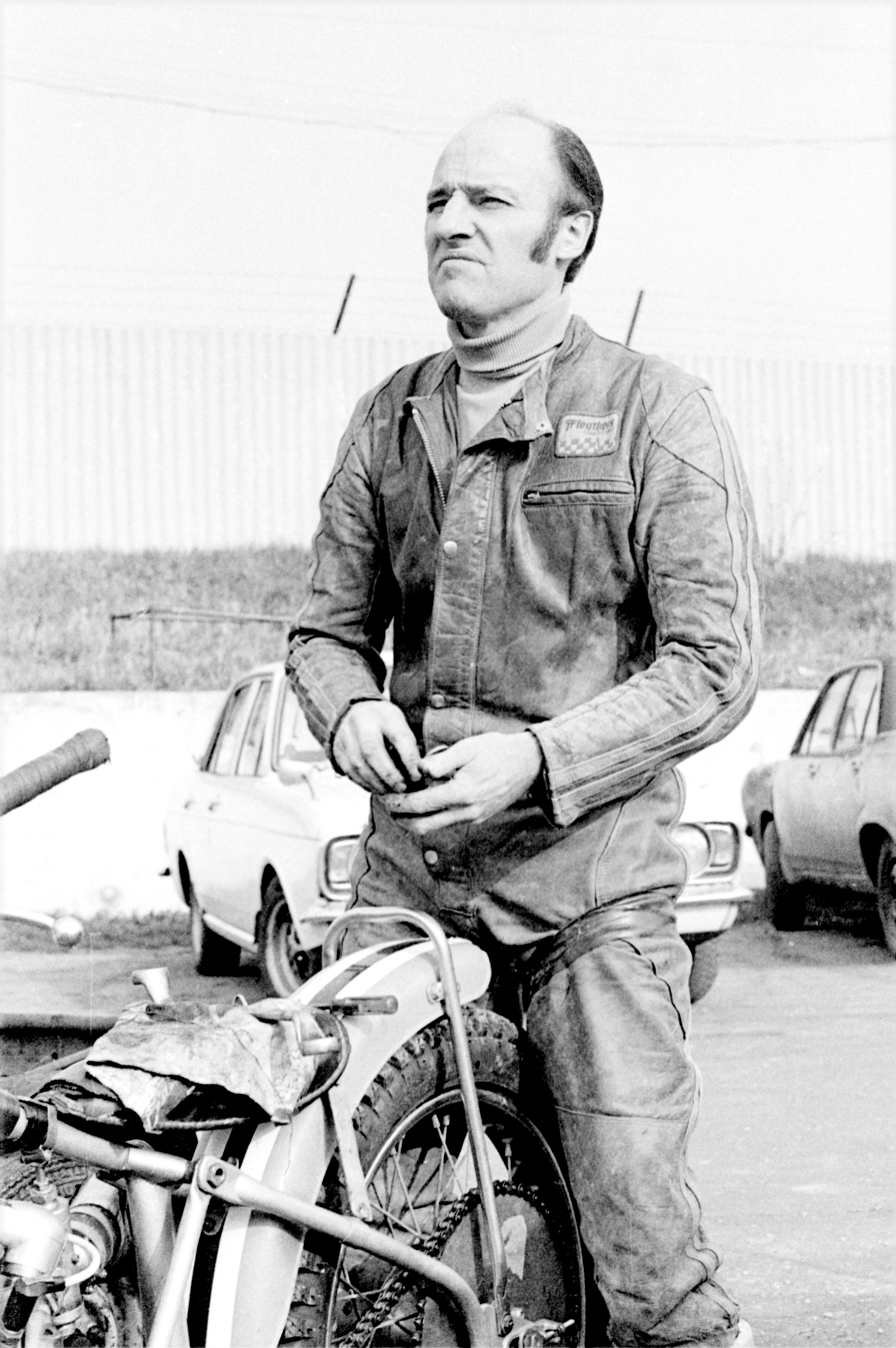
- Born: 22 June 1933; Blackheath, London, England
- Died: 13 April 2019 (aged 85)
- Nationality: British (English)

Career history
- 1955: Brafield Flying Foxes
- 1956-1957: Southern/Rayleigh Rovers
- 1957, 1959: Eastbourne Eagles
- 1958-1960, 1962-1964, 1967-1972: Oxford Cheetahs/Rebels
- 1965-1967: Exeter Falcons
- 1960-1962: Ipswich Witches
- 1973: Cradley United
- 1974-1978: Poole Pirates
- 1977: Crayford Kestrels

Individual honours
- 1965: British Championship finalist

Team honours
- 1964: National League winner
- 1964: National Trophy winner
- 1964: Britannia Shield Winner
- 1959: Southern Area League

Colin William Gooddy (22 June 1933 – 13 April 2019) was an international motorcycle speedway rider for the England national speedway team. He earned one international cap for the England national speedway team.

== Speedway career ==
Gooddy rode in the top tier of British Speedway from 1955 to 1977, riding for various clubs.

Gooddy rode most of his domestic career for Oxford Cheetahs, becoming a heat leader for them and representing them in three separate spells from 1958 to 1960, 1962 to 1964 and from 1967 to 1972.

Gooddy reached the final of the British Speedway Championship in 1965.

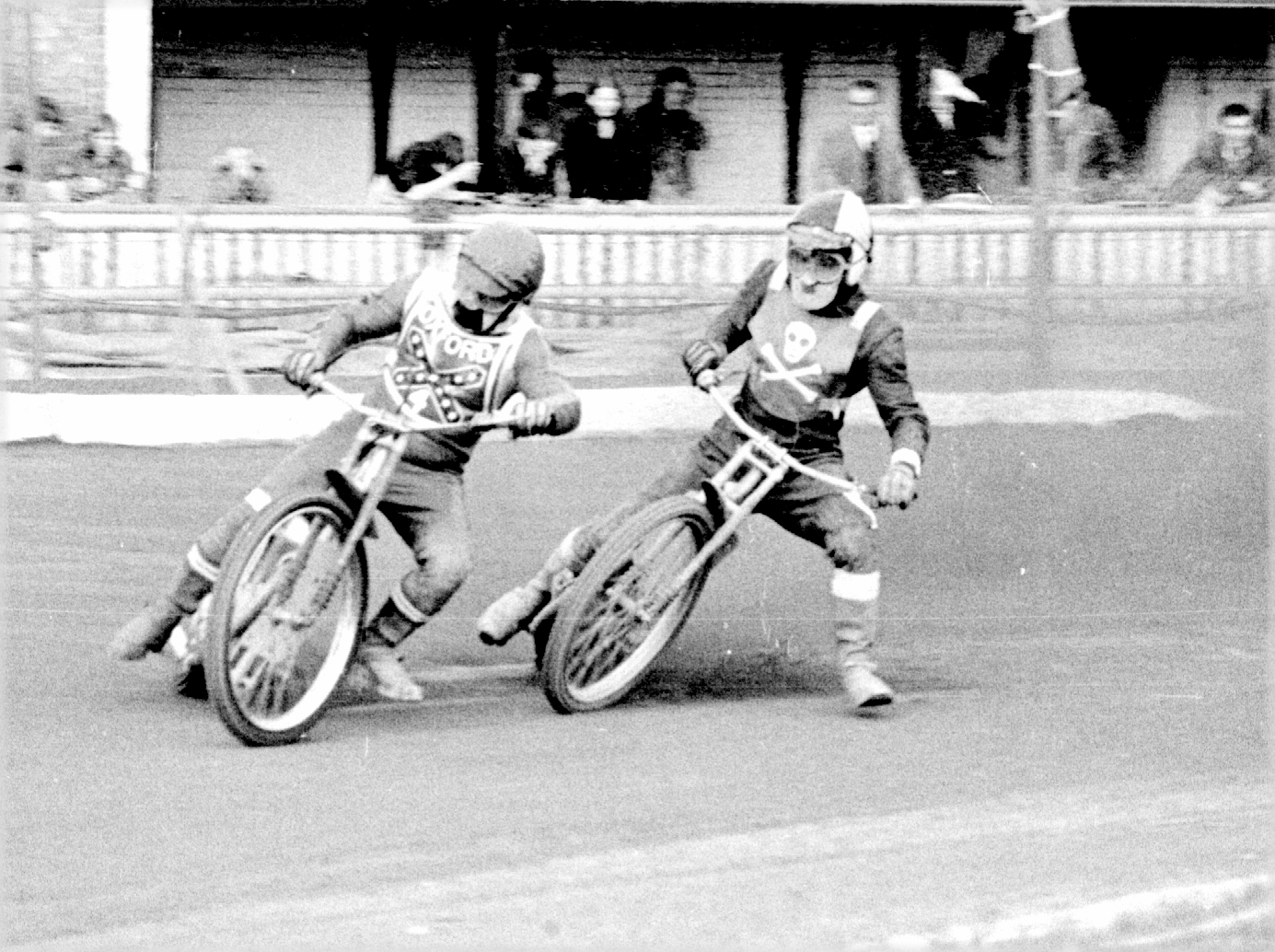
Bob Kilby of Oxford Rebels and Colin Gooddy of Poole Pirates in action 1974
