= Southern Area League =

UK speedway league

- Sport: Speedway
- Founded: 1954 replaced the Southern League
- Folded: 1959 replaced by the Provincial League
- Country: England

The Southern Area League was the regional third and then regional second tier of speedway racing in the United Kingdom for Southern British teams as a replacement for the defunct Southern League.

The league ran for three seasons from 1954 to 1956 as the regional third tier and then one season in 1957 as the regional second tier before league racing disappeared entirely below National League level in 1958. It returned for a final season in 1959.

== Champions ==
Season	Champions	Second
1954	California Poppies	Ringwood Turfs
1955	Rye House Roosters	California Poppies
1956	Rye House Roosters	Eastbourne Eagles
1957	Southern Rovers	Eastbourne Eagles
1959	Eastbourne Eagles	Yarmouth Bloaters

== See also ==
List of United Kingdom Speedway League Champions
