= 1961 Provincial Speedway League =

British motorcycle speedway season

- League: Provincial League
- No. of competitors: 11
- Champions: Poole Pirates
- Knockout Cup: Cradley Heathens
- Individual: Reg Reeves
- Highest average: Reg Reeves
- Division/s above: 1961 National League

The 1961 Provincial Speedway League was the second season of the Provincial League.

== Summary ==
Eleven speedway teams took part. Liverpool, Yarmouth and Bristol had all folded at the end of the previous season and Bradford were unable to take their place in the league after the construction of their new track was delayed.

Exeter, Plymouth, Wolverhampton, Middlesbrough and Newcastle all re-opened their tracks and joined the league for the start of the season. Plymouth took on Bristol's riders and Bulldog nickname. Poole were champions, finishing seven points ahead of runners up Plymouth. After a couple of challenge meetings held throughout 1960 Exeter returned following a five-year league absence under the promotion of Wally Mawdsley and Pete Lansdale.

== Final table ==
Pos	Team	M	W	D	L	Pts
1	Poole Pirates	20	15	1	4	31
2	Plymouth Bulldogs	20	12	0	8	24
3	Stoke Potters	20	12	0	8	24
4	Cradley Heath Heathens	20	11	1	8	23
5	Rayleigh Rockets	20	11	0	9	22
6	Edinburgh Monarchs	20	10	1	9	21
7	Sheffield Tigers	20	10	0	10	20
8	Exeter Falcons	20	9	0	11	18
9	Wolverhampton Wolves	20	7	0	13	14
10	Middlesbrough Bears	20	6	1	13	13
11	Newcastle Diamonds	20	5	0	15	10

M = Matches; W = Wins; D = Draws; L = Losses; Pts = Total Points

== Fixtures and results ==
Home \ Away	CH	ED	EX	MID	NEW	PLY	PP	RAY	SHE	STO	WOL
Cradley Heath		42–36	40–38	51–27	59–19	40–38	38–40	43–35	40–38	42–36	45–33
Edinburgh	43–34		44–34	46–31	60–18	46–32	39–39	40–38	55–20	45–33	46–32
Exeter	45–33	52–25		57–20	48–29	41–36	27–51	48–30	47–31	40–37	53–24
Middlesbrough	39–39	34–43	53–25		43–35	40–37	51–27	51–26	36–42	37–38	48–30
Newcastle	34–44	42–36	44–34	42.5–35.5		44–33	29–49	37–40	42–36	33–45	37–40
Plymouth	54–24	46–32	44–34	47–31	48–30		40–38	45–32	47–31	41–36	44–34
Poole	56–22	58–20	50.5–27.5	63–15	52–25	39–37		55–23	50–28	56–22	53–24
Rayleigh	50–28	40–38	50–25	50–28	50–28	41–37	45–32		46–32	51–27	53–25
Sheffield	39–38	48–30	50–27	46–32	50–28	37–41	42–36	61–17		41–37	40–38
Stoke	44–34	47–29	41–37	50–28	54–22	51–26	31–47	49–29	42–35		46–31
Wolverhampton	33–45	47–31	45–33	45–33	41–37	25–53	37–41	55–23	43–35	33–45	

Legend: Blue = home team win; Yellow = draw; Red = away team win.

== Top Five Riders (League only) ==
	Rider	Nat	Team	C.M.A.
1	Reg Reeves	(England)	Rayleigh	11.43
2	Jack Scott	(Australia)	Plymouth	11.08
3	Ken Middleditch	(England)	Poole	10.55
4	Ross Gilbertson	(Scotland)	Poole	10.51
5	Tony Lewis	(England)	Poole	10.32

== Provincial League Knockout Cup ==
The 1961 Provincial League Knockout Cup was the second edition of the Knockout Cup for the Provincial League teams. Cradley Heathens were the winners.

First round

Date	Team one	Score	Team two
13/05	Stoke	53–41	Middlesbrough
19/05	Rayleigh	50–46	Exeter

Second round

Date	Team one	Score	Team two
18/05	Sheffield	43–53	Plymouth
21/06	Poole	71–25	Wolverhampton
24/06	Stoke	46–50	Cradley Heath
17/07	Edinburgh	49–47	Rayleigh

Semifinals

Date	Team one	Score	Team two
29/07	Cradley Heath	55–41	Poole
12/08	Edinburgh	55–40	Plymouth

=== Final ===
First leg

9 September 1961

Cradley Heath Ivor Brown 15 Harry Bastable 13 Derek Timms 13 Ivor Davies 10 John Hart 8 Tony Eadon 7 Vic White 2	68 - 28	Edinburgh Doug Templeton 9 Willie Templeton 8 Jimmy Tannock 4 Wayne Briggs 4 Alf Wells 2 George Hunter 1 Dick Campbell 0

Dudley Wood Stadium

Second leg

23 September 1961

Edinburgh Dick Campbell 14 Jimmy Tannock 10 Wayne Briggs 9 Doug Templeton 9 Willie Templeton 8 George Hunter 5 Alf Wells 4	59 - 34	Cradley Heath Derek Timms 7 Ivor Brown 6 Harry Bastable 6 Tony Eadon 6 John Hart 4 Vic White 3 Ivor Davies 2

Old Meadowbank

== Riders' Championship ==
Reg Reeves won the Riders' Championship. The final was held at Harringay Stadium on 16 September in front of 20,000 spectators. Defending champion Trevor Redmond suffered a broken chain in his last race when leading Reeves, which prevented him from winning the title again.

Pos.	Rider	Pts	Total
1	(England) Reg Reeves	3 3 3 3 3	15
2	(New Zealand) Trevor Redmond	3 3 3 3 ef	12
3	(England) Maury Mattingley	3 2 1 3 3	12
4	(Australia) Jack Scott	2 3 2 2 2	11
5	(England) Stan Stevens	2 1 2 2 3	11
6	(England) Ivor Brown	3 3 2 ef 3	11
7	(England) Harry Bastable	1 2 3 2 2	10
8	(Australia) Graham Warren	1 1 2 f 2	6
9	(England) Ken Middleditch	0 1 1 1 2	5
10	(England) Len Silver	2 2 0 0 1	5
11	(England) Pete Lansdale	0 2 2 1 0	5
12	(England) Tony Lewis	exc 0 1 3 1	5
13	(England) Vic Ridgeon	2 1 0 1 1	4
14	(England) Rick France	1 0 0 2 0	3
15	(England) Eric Boothroyd	2 0 1 1 0	3
16	(England) Peter Jarman	f 0 0 f 1	1

- f=fell, r-retired, exc=excluded, ef=engine failure

== Riders & final averages ==
Cradley Heath

- (England) Ivor Brown 10.14
- (England) Harry Bastable 8.88
- (England) Stan Stevens 7.54
- (England) Ivor Davies 7.14
- (England) George Bewley 6.15
- (England) Derek Timms 5.97
- (England) Ronnie Rolfe 5.29
- (England) John Hart 5.04
- (England) Alan Totney 4.44
- (England) Tony Eadon 4.00
- (England) Vic White 2.97

Edinburgh

- (Scotland) Dick Campbell 9.65
- (Scotland) Doug Templeton 8.42
- (Scotland) George Hunter 7.41
- (Scotland) Willie Templeton 6.55
- (New Zealand) Wayne Briggs 5.83
- (Scotland) Jimmy Tannock 5.72
- (New Zealand) Alf Wells 4.20

Exeter

- (England) Pete Lansdale 9.33
- (England) Len Silver 8.81
- (England) Roy Bowers 8.12
- (England) Howdy Byford 8.00
- (England) Eric Hockaday 7.66
- (England) Francis Cann 6.75
- (England) Billy Smith 4.90
- (England) Clive Hitch 3.84
- (England) Eric Howe 3.60
- (England) Len Glover 2.25

Middlesbrough

- (England) Eric Boothroyd 9.05
- (England) Geoff Pymar 8.50
- (England) Clive Hitch 7.50
- (England) Don Wilkinson 7.00
- (England) Tommy Roper 6.49
- (England) Fred Greenwell 6.18
- (England) Wal Morton 5.65
- (England) Rick France 5.56
- (England) Eric Boocock 4.42
- (England) Bob Webb 4.00
- (England) Reg Nicholls 3.83
- (England) Vic Lonsdale (Jack Thorp) 3.78

Newcastle

- (England) Gil Goldfinch 8.65
- (England) Don Wilkinson 7.05
- (England) Vic Lonsdale (Jack Thorp) 5.85
- (England) George Major 5.67
- (England) Slant Payling 5.55
- (South Africa) George Glen 4.85
- (England) Pat Flanagan 4.65
- (Scotland) Gordon Mitchell 2.61

Plymouth

- (Australia) Jack Scott 11.08
- (England) Maury Mattingley 9.38
- (England) Cliff Cox 8.92
- (England) Ron Bagley 6.86
- (England) Chris Julian 6.03
- (England) Pat Flanagan 4.41
- (Canada) Chris Blewett 4.14
- (England) Ray Wickett 3.36
- (Scotland) George Summers 1.23

Poole

- (England) Ken Middleditch 10.55
- (Scotland) Ross Gilbertson 10.51
- (England) Tony Lewis 10.32
- (Australia) Geoff Mudge 7.80
- (England) Tim Bungay 6.32
- (England) Allan Kidd 5.88
- (England) Norman Strachan 4.68

Rayleigh

- (England) Reg Reeves 11.43
- (England) Stan Stevens 8.53
- (England) Harry Edwards 8.44
- (England) Bob Thomas 6.68
- (England) Roy Craighead 5.12
- (England) Geoff Penniket 4.89
- (England) Pete Sampson 4.39
- (England) Terry Stone 4.36

Sheffield

- (England) Guy Allott 9.64
- (England) Clive Featherby 9.59
- (Australia) Derrol Melbin 8.80
- (England) Ronnie Rolfe 7.20
- (England) Jack Winstanley 6.97
- (England) Stuart Hickman 6.86
- (England) Bernard McArthur 6.27
- (England) Tony Robinson 6.21
- (England) Col Smith 3.64
- (England) Malcolm Bruce 3.40

Stoke

- (England) Reg Fearman 9.60
- (England) Ron Sharp 9.50
- (England) Brian Craven 8.64
- (England) Ken Adams 8.59
- (England) Eric Hockaday 8.44
- (England) Ray Harris 7.63
- (England) Pete Jarman 6.97
- (England) Peter Kelly 6.92
- (England) Bill Wainwright 5.23
- (England) John Edwards 5.22
- (England) Frank Wooster 3.86
- (England) Colin Pratt 3.00
- (England) John Key 2.32

Wolverhampton

- (Australia) Graham Warren 10.00
- (England) Ernie Lessiter 8.33
- (England) Tommy Sweetman 6.92
- (England) Vic Ridgeon 6.45
- (England) Terry Betts 6.24
- (England) Bob Oakley 5.39
- (England) Ron Taylor 4.97
- (England) Derek Braithwaite 4.73
- (Wales) Cyril Francis 4.67
- (Wales) Howard Cole (Kid Bodie) 4.62
- (England) Eric Eadon 2.53
- (England) Bob Warner 2.46

== See also ==
- List of United Kingdom Speedway League Champions
- Knockout Cup (speedway)
