= 1960 Provincial Speedway League =

British motorcycle speedway season

- League: Provincial League
- No. of competitors: 10
- Champions: Rayleigh Rockets
- Knockout Cup: Bristol Bulldogs
- Individual: Trevor Redmond
- Highest average: Reg Reeves
- Division/s above: 1960 National League

The 1960 Provincial Speedway League was the first season of the Provincial League, ten motorcycle speedway teams took part.

== Teams ==
The ten teams that made up the re-incarnated Provincial League were mainly teams that had not experienced league racing for several years. Eight teams were Sheffield Tigers (who had been without league speedway since 1951), Cradley Heath Heathens (1952), Stoke Potters & Liverpool Pirates (1953), Bristol Bulldogs and Edinburgh Monarchs (1954), Bradford Panthers (formerly Odsal) & Rayleigh Rockets (1957). The remaining two teams were Poole Pirates, who joined from the National League and Yarmouth Bloaters, who joined the league after moving up from the Southern Area League. The Southern Area League was disbanded leaving three teams Eastbourne Eagles, Aldershot Shots and Rye House Rockets without a league, so they ran a series of challenge matches throughout 1960.

== Summary ==
The league was dominated by Rayleigh, Poole and Bristol. Rayleigh and Poole finished on the same points, but Rayleigh triumphed with a superior number of race points scored. At the end of the season Liverpool and Yarmouth folded and Bristol closed after their track was sold for redevelopment.

== Final table ==
Pos	Team	M	W	D	L	Pts
1	Rayleigh Rockets	18	16	0	2	32
2	Poole Pirates	18	16	0	2	32
3	Bristol Bulldogs	18	15	0	3	30
4	Sheffield Tigers	18	9	0	9	18
5	Stoke Potters	18	8	1	9	17
6	Cradley Heath Heathens	18	8	0	10	16
7	Yarmouth Bloaters	18	7	0	11	14
8	Edinburgh Monarchs	18	5	1	12	11
9	Liverpool Pirates	18	4	0	14	8
10	Bradford Panthers	18	1	0	17	2

M = Matches; W = Wins; D = Draws; L = Losses; Pts = Total Points

== Fixtures & results ==
Home \ Away	BRA	BRI	CH	ED	LIV	PP	RAY	SHE	STO	YAR
Bradford		27–43	28–44	37–34	34–38	24–28	31–41	34–36	33–38	24–44
Bristol	52–20		40–32	50–22	55–16	35–37	34–38	52–20	44–28	38–34
Cradley Heath	47–25	36–36		41–31	44–28	29–42	34–38	49–23	43–29	37–35
Edinburgh	42–30	33–39	44–28		39–33	34–38	27–45	35–37	37–32	40–28
Liverpool	45–27	25–46	34–38	37–34		25–47	26–46	40–31	32–37	28–42
Poole	+	38–34	40–31	52–19	51–21		41–31	50–21	48–24	45–26
Rayleigh	59–12	35–37	50–20	52–20	58–14	40–32		49–23	54–18	43–29
Sheffield	51–21	31–41	42–29	53–19	40–32	29–41	25–47		47–25	45–27
Stoke	42–25	32–37	42–30	35–35	44–26	37–34	34–38	41–31		37–32
Bradford	45–27	35–36	42–30	43–28	45–27	34–37	28–44	27–45	43–29	

Legend: Blue = home team win; Yellow = draw; Red = away team win.

+Poole awarded points

== Top five averages (league only) ==
	Rider	Nat	Team	C.M.A.
1	Reg Reeves	(England)	Rayleigh	11.29
2	Trevor Redmond	(New Zealand)	Bristol	10.92
3	Harry Bastable	(England)	Cradley Heath	10.59
4	Tony Lewis	(England)	Poole	10.43
5	Alan Smith	(England)	Rayleigh	10.41

== Provincial League Knockout Cup ==
The 1960 Provincial League Knockout Cup was the first edition of the Knockout Cup for the Provincial League teams. Bristol Bulldogs were the winners.

First round

Date	Team one	Score	Team two
30/05	Liverpool	47–49	Cradley Heath
09/07	Edinburgh	59–37	Sheffield

Second round

Date	Team one	Score	Team two
25/06	Bradford	35–61	Bristol
02/07	Stoke	60–35	Cradley Heath
16/07	Edinburgh	54–41	Yarmouth
03/08	Poole	47–49	Rayleigh

Semifinals

Date	Team one	Score	Team two
27/08	Edinburgh	38–58	Bristol
02/09	Rayleigh	52–43	Stoke

=== Final ===
Date	Team one	Score	Team two
07/09	Rayleigh	52–41	Bristol
23/09	Bristol	59–37	Rayleigh

== Riders' Championship ==
Trevor Redmond won the Riders' Championship. The final was held at Dudley Wood Stadium on 24 September.

Pos.	Rider	Pts	Total
1	(New Zealand) Trevor Redmond	3 3 3 3 3	15
2	(England) Ken Middleditch	3 3 2 3 2	13
3	(England) Eric Hockaday	3 3 3 1 3	13
4	(England) Tony Robinson	3 3 1 2 2	11
5	(Scotland) Doug Templeton	2 1 3 3 1	10
6	(England) Jack Kitchen	2 2 2 0 3	9
7	(England) Tony Lewis	2 1 2 2 2	9
8	(England) Wal Morton	1 1 0 3 0	9
9	(England) Ivor Brown	1 2 3 1 1	9
10	(England) Tommy Roper	2 0 2 1 0	5
11	(England) Johnny Hole	0 2 1 2 3	5
12	(England) Reg Reeves	1 1 1 0 1	4
13	(England) Ray Day	0 2 1 0 0	3
14	(Scotland) Ross Gilbertson (res)	2 1	3
15	(England) Eric Eadon (res)	1 2	3
16	(England) Clive Featherby	1 0 r	1
17	(England) Norman Strachan	f 0 0 0 0	0
18	(England) Cliff Cox	0 0 0	0

- f=fell r-retired

== Riders & final averages ==
Bradford

- (England) Tommy Roper 6.90
- (England) Ray Day 6.57
- (England) Vic Lonsdale (Jack Thorp) 5.46
- (England) Stan Holey 4.48
- (England) Jim Yacoby 4.15
- (England) Dave Anderson 3.08
- (England) Tony Barnard 1.64

Bristol

- (New Zealand) Trevor Redmond 10.92
- (England) Johnny Hole 10.00
- (England) Cliff Cox 7.83
- (England) Roy Taylor 7.79
- (England) Chris Julian 7.20
- (England) Ernie Baker 6.83
- (England) Pat Flanagan 6.24
- (England) Frank Evans 5.87
- (England) Ivor Toms 5.29

Cradley Heath

- (England) Harry Bastable 10.59
- (England) Eric Eadon 8.06
- (England) Ronnie Rolfe 6.59
- (England) Roy Spencer 6.04
- (England) George Bewley 5.55
- (England) Vic White 5.28
- (England) Tony Eadon 3.52
- (England) Errol Brook 2.00

Edinburgh

- (Scotland) Doug Templeton 8.16
- (England) Reg Luckhurst 8.00
- (Scotland) Willie Templeton 7.13
- (England) Fred Greenwell 6.76
- (Scotland) George Hunter 4.34
- (Scotland) Jimmy Tannock 4.30
- (Scotland) Gordon Mitchell 3.62
- (Scotland) Jimmy Cox 3.55

Liverpool

- (England) Brian Craven 10.00
- (Australia) Shorty Schirmer 8.15
- (England) Wal Morton 7.40
- (United States) Dave Dodd 5.30
- (England) Dennis Jenkins 4.93
- (England) Col Smith 3.52
- (England) Graham Beattie 3.26
- (England) Bob McHugh 2.57
- (England) Derick Skyner 2.09

Poole

- (England) Tony Lewis 10.43
- (Scotland) Ross Gilbertson 9.93
- (England) Ken Middleditch 9.40
- (England) Norman Strachan 7.72
- (Australia) Geoff Mudge 7.52
- (England) Allan Kidd 7.93
- (England) Jimmy Gleed 6.00
- (Australia) Charlie Wallis 5.25
- (England) Gerry Bridson 2.75

Rayleigh

- (England) Reg Reeves 11.29
- (England) Alan Smith 10.41
- (England) Eric Hockaday 9.24
- (England) Pete Lansdale 8.94
- (England) Stan Stevens 7.58
- (England) Roy Craighead 5.85
- (England) Clive Hitch 5.37
- (England) John Leggett 4.50
- (England) Reg Nicholls 4.00

Sheffield

- (England) Tony Robinson 9.60
- (England) Len Williams 9.20
- (England) Jack Kitchen 8.55
- (England) Stuart Hickman 6.26
- (England) Jack Winstanley 5.19
- (England) Malcolm Bruce 4.13
- (England) Terry Turner 2.86
- (Australia) Derrol Melbin 2.32
- (England) Bernard McArthur 1.43

Stoke

- (England) Ken Adams 11.00
- (England) Reg Fearman 9.12
- (England) Ray Harris 7.62
- (England) Les Jenkins 7.57
- (England) Pete Jarman 6.06
- (England) Peter Kelly 5.73
- (England) Bill Bridgett 5.29
- (England) Gordon Owen 4.53
- (England) Arthur Rowe 3.38
- (England) Ted Connor 3.09

Yarmouth

- (England) Ivor Brown 9.78
- (Guernsey) Johnny Fitzpatrick 8.24
- (England) Geoff Pymar 8.00
- (England) John Debbage 5.53
- (England) Ron Bagley 5.77
- (England) Ken Last 4.59
- (England) John Leggett 3.48

== See also ==
- List of United Kingdom Speedway League Champions
- Knockout Cup (speedway)
