= 1962 Individual Speedway World Championship =

Motorcycle speedway world championship season

Seasons
- ← 1961 1963 →

The 1962 Individual Speedway World Championship was the 17th edition of the official World Championship to determine the world champion rider.

The final was sponsored by the Sunday Pictorial and England's Peter Craven won his second title finishing one point ahead of two-time champion Barry Briggs. Three time champion Ove Fundin defeated fellow Swede Björn Knutson in a ride off to claim the bronze medal.

== First round ==
Qualification results.

=== British & Commonwealth provincial qualifying ===
- Top 16 riders to British Provincial final

| Date | Venue | Winner | 2nd | 3rd |
|---|---|---|---|---|
| 4 June | Brough Park, Newcastle upon Tyne | Brian Craven | Stan Stevens | Gil Goldfinch |
| 4 June | County Ground, Exeter | Cliff Cox | Len Silver | Chris Julian |
| 6 June | Wimborne Road, Poole | Tony Lewis | Peter Vandenberg | Geoff Mudge |
| 7 June | Cleveland Park Stadium, Middlesbrough | Peter Vandenberg | Eric Boothroyd | Wayne Briggs |
| 7 June | Owlerton Stadium, Sheffield | Guy Allott | Clive Featherby | Dick Campbell |
| 7 June | Pennycross Stadium, Plymouth | Jimmy Squibb | Peter Jarman | Ross Gilbertson |
| 8 June | Monmore Green, Wolverhampton | Willie Templeton | Graham Warren | Norman Hunter |
| 8 June | Leicester Stadium, Leicester | Ivor Brown | Harry Edwards | Gil Goldfinch |
| 8 June | Greenfield Stadium, Bradford | Brian Craven | Cliff Cox | Tommy Roper |
| 9 June | Neath Abbey Stadium, Neath | Eric Boothroyd | Trevor Redmond | Geoff Mudge |
| 9 June | Old Meadowbank, Edinburgh | Wayne Briggs | Clive Featherby | Doug Templeton |
| 9 June | Dudley Wood Stadium, Dudley | Ivor Brown | Ross Gilbertson | Tony Lewis |
| 9 June | Sun Street Stadium, Hanley | Ken Adams | Peter Jarman | Tommy Roper |

=== Norwegian qualifying ===
- 22 October 1961
- (Norway) Krohnsminde Idrettsplass, Bergen
- Top 5 to Nordic qualification 1962

| Pos. | Rider | Points |
|---|---|---|
| 1 | Aage Hansen | 14 |
| 2 | Sverre Harrfeldt | 12 |
| 3 | Reidar Kristoffersen | 11 |
| 4 | Egil Bratvold | 9 |
| 5 | Svein Johnsen | 9 |
| 6 | Oystein Mellerud | 9 |
| 7 | Cato Agnor | 8 |
| 8 | Per Aulie | 8 |
| 9 | Bjarne Sorenby | 7 |
| 10 | Odvar Kristiansen | 6 |
| 11 | Jon Odegaard | 6 |
| 12 | Fred Roger Steen | 5 |
| 13 | Haavard Gulbjörnrud | 5 |
| 14 | Reidar Bakken | 4 |
| 15 | Gunnar Skjetene | 4 |

=== Finnish qualifying ===
- 17 September 1961
- (Finland) Turku Hippodrome, Turku
- First 5 to Nordic qualification 1962

| Pos. | Rider | Points |
|---|---|---|
| 1 | Timo Laine | 15 |
| 2 | Antti Pajari | 14 |
| 3 | Ilkka Helminen | 13 |
| 4 | Esko Koponen | 12 |
| 5 | Olavi Turunen | 11 |
| 6 | Antero Salasto | 10 |
| 7 | Veikko Kirjonen | 8 |
| 8 | Martti Assinen | 8 |
| 9 | Nils Staaf | 7 |
| 10 | Jan Ulfingman | 6 |
| 11 | Reijo Saburin | 5 |
| 12 | Martti Koivuoja | 5 |
| 13 | Osmo Hokkannen | 2 |
| 14 | Pertti Petersohn | 2 |
| 15 | Bertil Kollroos | 0 |

=== Swedish qualifying ===
- Top 15 to Nordic qualifying

| Date | Venue | Winner | 2nd | 3rd |
|---|---|---|---|---|
| 29 April | Gamla Motorstadion, Målilla | Ove Fundin | Rune Sörmander | Leif Larsson |
| 1 May | Gamla Speedway Track, Visby | Björn Knutson | Curt Eldh | Göte Nordin |
| 3 May | Hammarby IP, Stockholm | Ove Fundin | Björn Knutson | Leif Larsson |

| Pos. | Rider | Points |
|---|---|---|
| 1 | Ove Fundin | 30 |
| 2 | Björn Knutson | 27 |
| 3 | Rune Sörmander | 26 |
| 4 | Leif Larsson | 25 |
| 5 | Curt Eldh | 24 |
| 6 | Per-Tage Svensson | 22 |
| 7 | Göte Nordin | 20 |
| 8 | Bengt Brannefors | 20 |
| 9 | Evert Andersson | 19 |
| 10 | Sören Sjösten | 18 |
| 11 | Joel Jansson | 17 |
| 12 | Arne Carlsson | 16 |
| 13 | Åke Andersson | 16 |

| Pos. | Rider | Points |
|---|---|---|
| 14 | Göran Norlén | 15 |
| 15 | Kjell Svensson | 12 |
| 16 | Willihard Thomsson | 11 |
| 17 | Inge Gustafsson | 10 |
| 18 | Göran Carlsson | 7 |
| 19 | Sigvard Johansson | 5 |
| 20 | Jan Ekeroth | 5 |
| 21 | Kurt Westlund | 4 |
| 22 | Thore Kindstrand | 2 |
| 23 | Curt Nyqvist | 2 |
| 24 | Olle Nygren | 2 |
| 25 | Per-Åke Lundgren | 2 |
| 26 | Bengt Jansson | 2 |

=== Continental qualifying ===
- Top 32 to Continental semi-final

| Date | Venue | Winner | 2nd | 3rd |
|---|---|---|---|---|
| 7 April | (Austria) Praterstadion, Vienna | (Czechoslovakia) Luboš Tomíček Sr. | (West Germany) Manfred Poschenreider | (Austria) Josef Bössner |
| 13 May | (Soviet Union) Rivne Speedway Stadium, Rivne | (Poland) Joachim Maj | (Czechoslovakia) Bedřich Slaný | (Soviet Union) Viktor Trofimov |
| 13 May | (Czechoslovakia) Trade Union Stadium, Ostrava | (Czechoslovakia) Antonín Kasper Sr. | (Poland) Andrzej Domiszewski | (Poland) Konstanty Pociejkewicz |
| 13 May | (Socialist Federal Republic of Yugoslavia) Gradski Stadion, Osijek | (Poland) Paweł Waloszek | (Poland) Florian Kapała | (Soviet Union) Igor Plekhanov |

== Second Round ==
=== Nordic Qualifying ===
- 24 May
- (Denmark) Odense Athletics Stadium, Odense
- Top 8 to Nordic final

| Pos. | Rider | Points |
|---|---|---|
| 1 | Björn Knutson | 14 |
| 2 | Ove Fundin | 13 |
| 3 | Leif Larsson | 11 |
| 4 | Göran Norlén | 11 |
| 5 | Sören Sjösten | 11 |
| 6 | Kurt W Petersen | 10 |
| 7 | Sverre Harrfeldt | 9 |
| 8 | Willihard Thomsson | 8 |

- 27 May
- (Sweden) Målilla Motorbana, Målilla
- Top 8 to Nordic final

| Pos. | Rider | Points |
|---|---|---|
| 1 | Göte Nordin | 15 |
| 2 | Åke Andersson | 12 |
| 3 | Bengt Brannefors | 12 |
| 4 | Arne Carlsson | 11 |
| 5 | Rune Sörmander | 11 |
| 6 | Inge Gustafsson | 9 |
| 7 | Per-Tage Svensson | 9 |
| 8 | Aage Hansen | 9 |
| 9 | Evert Andersson | 8 |
| 10 | Paul Wissing | 6 |
| 11 | Kalevi Lahtinen | 5 |
| 12 | Esko Koponen | 3 |
| 13 | Timo Laine | 4 |
| 14 | Göran Carlsson | 3 |
| 15 | Olavi Turunen | 3 |
| 16 | Illka Helminen | 0 |
| 17 | Antti Pajari | 0 |

=== British Provincial final ===
- 15 June, Monmore Green Stadium, Wolverhampton
- Top 6 riders to British national league round

| Pos. | Rider | Points |
|---|---|---|
| 1 | Peter Vandenberg | 14 |
| 2 | Jimmy Squibb | 10+3 |
| 3 | Doug Templeton | 10+2 |
| 4 | Brian Craven | 10+1 |
| 5 | Gil Goldfinch | 10+0 |
| 6 | Trevor Redmond | 9 |
| 7 | Geoff Mudge | 9 |
| 8 | Ivor Brown | 8 |
| 9 | Cliff Cox | 8 |

| Pos. | Rider | Points |
|---|---|---|
| 10 | Wayne Briggs | 7 |
| 11 | Ken Adams | 6 |
| 12 | Eric Boothroyd | 5 |
| 13 | Ross Gilbertson | 2 |
| 14 | Stan Stevens | 2 |
| 15 | Tony Lewis | 0 |
| 16 | Pete Jarman | 0 |
| 17 | Tommy Roper | 0 |

=== Continental semi-finals ===
3 June

- (Soviet Union) Army Sports Club Stadium, Lviv
- Top 8 to Continental final

| Pos. | Rider | Points |
|---|---|---|
| 1 | Bedřich Slaný | 13 |
| 2 | Janusz Suchecki | 12 |
| 3 | Jaroslav Volf | 11 |
| 4 | Boris Samorodov | 11 |
| 5 | Joachim Maj | 9 |
| 6 | Konstanty Pociejkewicz | 9 |
| 7 | Bronislaw Rogal | 9 |
| 8 | Antonin Novak | 8 |
| 9 | Farid Szajnurov | 7 |
| 10 | Leonid Drobiazko | 7 |
| 11 | Norbert Świtała | 7 |
| 12 | Wiktor Kuzniecow | 5 |
| 13 | Viktor Trofimov | 5 |
| 14 | Antonín Kasper Sr. | 4 |
| 15 | Andrzej Domiszewski | 2 |
| 16 | Jurij Olenew | 1 |
| 17 | Mieczysław Połukard | 0 |

- 3 June
- (Poland) Army Stadium, Warsaw
- Top 8 to Continental final

| Pos. | Rider | Points |
|---|---|---|
| 1 | Marian Kaiser | 14 |
| 2 | Henryk Zyto | 13 |
| 3 | Florian Kapala | 12 |
| 4 | Stanislaw Tkocz | 11 |
| 5 | Luboš Tomíček Sr. | 11 |
| 6 | Pawel Waloszek | 10 |
| 7 | Igor Plechanov | 9 |
| 8 | Stanislav Kubicek | 8 |
| 9 | Jan Malinowski | 6 |
| 10 | Jan Kusiak | 6 |
| 11 | Karel Průša | 6 |
| 12 | Drago Perko | 5 |
| 13 | Josef Bössner | 3 |
| 14 | Valent Medved | 3 |
| 15 | Kurt Wilder | 3 |
| 16 | Alfred Sitzwohl | 0 |

== Third round ==
=== British & Commonwealth national league round ===
- Top 16 to British & Commonwealth final

| Date | Venue | Winner | 2nd | 3rd |
|---|---|---|---|---|
| 30 June | Brandon Stadium, Coventry | Ken McKinlay | Ron Mountford | Barry Briggs |
| 30 June | Abbey Stadium, Swindon | Ronnie Moore | Les Owen | Bob Andrews |
| 2 July | Wimbledon Stadium, London | Ronnie Moore | Barry Briggs | Peter Moore |
| 3 July | Banister Court Stadium, Southampton | Alby Golden | Neil Street | Ronnie Genz |
| 5 July | Oxford Stadium, Oxford | Peter Craven | Billy Bales | Mike Broadbanks |
| 6 July | Foxhall Stadium, Ipswich | Barry Briggs | Dick Fisher | Peter Moore |
| 6 July | Leicester Stadium, Leicester | Peter Craven | Ron How | Ian Williams |
| 7 July | The Firs Stadium, Norwich | Ron How | Bob Andrews | Billy Bales |
| 7 July | Hyde Road, Manchester | Peter Craven | Dick Fisher | Gerald Jackson |

=== Nordic Final ===
- July 3, 1962
- (Denmark) Selskov Stadium, Hillerød
- First 8 to European Final

| Placing | Rider | Total | 1 | 2 | 3 | 4 | 5 | 6 | 7 | 8 | 9 | 10 | 11 | 12 | 13 | 14 | 15 | 16 | 17 | 18 | 19 | 20 | Pts | Pos | 21 |
|---|---|---|---|---|---|---|---|---|---|---|---|---|---|---|---|---|---|---|---|---|---|---|---|---|---|
| 1 | (Sweden) (13) Björn Knutson | 14 | | | | 3 | 3 | | | | | | | 3 | | 3 | | | | | 2 | | 14 | 1 | |
| 2 | (Sweden) (10) Göte Nordin | 14 | | | 3 | | | 3 | | | | | | 2 | | | 3 | | 3 | | | | 14 | 2 | |
| 3 | (Sweden) (4) Ove Fundin | 12 | 3 | | | | | | | 3 | | | | 0 | | | | 3 | | | | 3 | 12 | 3 | |
| 4 | (Sweden) (6) Sören Sjösten | 12 | | 3 | | | | 2 | | | 3 | | | | | | | 1 | | | 3 | | 12 | 4 | |
| 5 | (Sweden) (1) Bengt Brannefors | 10 | 2 | | | | 2 | | | | 2 | | | | 3 | | | | 1 | | | | 10 | 5 | |
| 6 | (Sweden) (9) Arne Carlsson | 9 | | | 0 | | 1 | | | | | | 3 | | | | | 2 | | 3 | | | 9 | 6 | |
| 7 | (Norway) (2) Aage Hansen | 8.5 | 1 | | | | | 1/2 | | | | 3 | | | | 2 | | | | 2 | | | 8.5 | 7 | |
| 8 | (Sweden) (7) Rune Sörmander | 8 | | 2 | | | | | 3 | | | | | 1 | 2 | | | | | T | | | 8 | 8 | |
| 9 | (Sweden) (15) Leif Larsson | 8 | | | | 2 | | | 2 | | | 2 | | | | | | 0 | 2 | | | | 8 | 9 | |
| 10 | (Denmark) (5) Kurt W. Petersen | 6 | | 1 | | | 0 | | | | | 1 | | | | | 2 | | | | | 2 | 6 | 10 | |
| 11 | (Norway) (12) Sverre Harrfeldt | 5 | | | 2 | | | | | 2 | | 0 | | | 1 | | | | | | F | | 5 | 11 | |
| 12 | (Sweden) (11) Per Tage Svensson | 4 | | | 1 | | | | 1 | | 1 | | | | | 0 | | | | | | 1 | 4 | 12 | |
| 13 | (Sweden) (8) Inge Gustafsson | 3 | | 0 | | | | | | 0 | | | 2 | | | 1 | | | 0 | | | | 3 | 13 | |
| 14 | (Sweden) (16) Willihard Thomsson | 3 | | | | 0 | | | | 1 | 0 | | | | | | 1 | | | 1 | | | 3 | 14 | |
| 15 | (Sweden) (14) Åke Andersson | 2.5 | | | | 1 | | 1/2 | | | | | 1 | | 0 | | | | | | | - | 2.5 | 15 | |
| 16 | (Sweden) (3) Goran Norlen | 1 | 0 | | | | | | 0 | | | | 0 | | | | 0 | | | | 1 | | 1 | 16 | |
| R1 | (Sweden) (R1) Evert Andersson | 0 | | | | | | | | | | | | | | | | | | | | 0 | 0 | R1 | |
| Placing | Rider | Total | 1 | 2 | 3 | 4 | 5 | 6 | 7 | 8 | 9 | 10 | 11 | 12 | 13 | 14 | 15 | 16 | 17 | 18 | 19 | 20 | Pts | Pos | 21 |

m - exclusion for exceeding two minute time allowance • t - exclusion for touching the tapes • x - other exclusion • e - retired or mechanical failure • f - fell • ns - non-starter • nc - non-classify

| gate A - inside | gate B | gate C | gate D - outside |

=== Continental Final ===
- 17 June 1962
- (Poland) Olympic Stadium Wrocław, Wrocław
- First 8 to European Final

| Placing | Rider | Total | 1 | 2 | 3 | 4 | 5 | 6 | 7 | 8 | 9 | 10 | 11 | 12 | 13 | 14 | 15 | 16 | 17 | 18 | 19 | 20 | Pts | Pos | 21 |
|---|---|---|---|---|---|---|---|---|---|---|---|---|---|---|---|---|---|---|---|---|---|---|---|---|---|
| 1 | (Poland) (1) Marian Kaiser | 14 | 2 | | | | 3 | | | | 3 | | | | 3 | | | | 3 | | | | 14 | 1 | |
| 2 | (Poland) (13) Paweł Waloszek | 13 | | | | 2 | 2 | | | | | | | 3 | | 3 | | | | | 3 | | 13 | 2 | |
| 3 | (Czechoslovakia) (15) Luboš Tomíček Sr. | 12 | | | | 3 | | | 3 | | | 3 | | | | | | 2 | 1 | | | | 12 | 3 | |
| 4 | (Poland) (10) Florian Kapała | 11 | | | 3 | | | 3 | | | | | | 0 | | | 3 | | 2 | | | | 11 | 4 | |
| 5 | (Soviet Union) (7) Igor Plekhanov | 10 | | 3 | | | | | 1 | | | | | 2 | 2 | | | | | 2 | | | 10 | 5 | |
| 6 | (Poland) (9) Henryk Żyto | 9 | | | 2 | | 1 | | | | | | F | | | | | 3 | | 3 | | | 9 | 6 | |
| 7 | (Soviet Union) (2) Farid Szajnurov | 9 | 3 | | | | | 2 | | | | 2 | | | | 1 | | | | 1 | | | 9 | 7 | |
| 8 | (Poland) (4) Stanisław Tkocz | 8 | 1 | | | | | | | 2 | | | | 1 | | | | 1 | | | | 3 | 8 | 8 | |
| 9 | (Czechoslovakia) (5) Bedřich Slaný | 6 | | 2 | | | 0 | | | | | 0 | | | | | 2 | | | | | 2 | 6 | 9 | 3 |
| 10 | (Czechoslovakia) (12) Jaroslav Volf | 6 | | | 0 | | | | | 3 | | 1 | | | 0 | | | | | | 2 | | 6 | 10 | 2 |
| 11 | (Poland) (3) Jerzy Suchecki | 6 | 0 | | | | | | 2 | | | | 2 | | | | 1 | | | | 1 | | 6 | 11 | F |
| 12 | (Poland) (14) Konstanty Pociejkewicz | 5 | | | | 1 | | 0 | | | | | 3 | | 1 | | | | | | | 0 | 5 | 12 | |
| 13 | (Czechoslovakia) (11) Antonin Novak | 4 | | | 1 | | | | 0 | | 0 | | | | | 2 | | | | | | 1 | 4 | 13 | |
| 14 | (Poland) (6) Joachim Maj | 3 | | 1 | | | | 1 | | | 1 | | | | | | | 0 | | | 0 | | 3 | 14 | |
| 15 | (Soviet Union) (16) Boris Samorodov | 2 | | | | 0 | | | | 0 | 2 | | | | | | 0 | | | 0 | | | 2 | 15 | |
| 16 | (Czechoslovakia) (8) Stanislav Kubíček | 2 | | 0 | | | | | | 1 | | | 1 | | | 0 | | | X | | | | 2 | 16 | |
| R1 | (Poland) (R1) Bronislaw Rogal | 0 | | | | | | | | | | | | | | | | | | | | | 0 | R1 | |
| Placing | Rider | Total | 1 | 2 | 3 | 4 | 5 | 6 | 7 | 8 | 9 | 10 | 11 | 12 | 13 | 14 | 15 | 16 | 17 | 18 | 19 | 20 | Pts | Pos | 21 |

m - exclusion for exceeding two minute time allowance • t - exclusion for touching the tapes • x - other exclusion • e - retired or mechanical failure • f - fell • ns - non-starter • nc - non-classify

| gate A - inside | gate B | gate C | gate D - outside |

== Fourth round ==
=== British & Commonwealth Finals ===
Three events with the top 8 accumulated scorers going through to World final.

| Date | Venue | Winner | 2nd | 3rd |
|---|---|---|---|---|
| 23 July | Wimbledon Stadium, London | Peter Craven | Ronnie Moore | Barry Briggs |
| 24 July | Banister Court Stadium, Southampton | Peter Craven | Barry Briggs | Ken McKinlay |
| 27 July | The Firs Stadium, Norwich | Barry Briggs | Ronnie Moore | Peter Craven |

| Pos. | Rider | Points |
|---|---|---|
| 1 | (England) Peter Craven | 41+3 |
| 2 | (New Zealand) Barry Briggs | 41+2 |
| 3 | (New Zealand) Ronnie Moore | 38 |
| 4 | (Scotland) Ken McKinlay | 33 |
| 5 | (England) Ron How | 30 |
| 6 | (England) Ron Mountford | 29 |
| 7 | (England) Bob Andrews | 29 |
| 8 | (England) Mike Broadbanks | 26 |

| Pos. | Rider | Points |
|---|---|---|
| 9 | (England) Nigel Boocock | 22 |
| 10 | (Australia) Peter Moore | 19 |
| 11 | (England) Dick Fisher | 11 |
| 12 | (Australia) Peter Vandenberg | 11 |
| 13 | (England) Cyril Roger | 10 |
| 14 | (England) Brian Craven | 7 |
| 15 | (Wales) Ian Williams | 7 |
| 16 | (England) Billy Bales | 3 |
| 17 | (England) Ronnie Genz | 3 |

=== European Final ===
- 26 June 1962
- (Norway) Dælenenga idrettspark, Oslo
- First 8 to World Final plus 1 reserve

| Placing | Rider | Total | 1 | 2 | 3 | 4 | 5 | 6 | 7 | 8 | 9 | 10 | 11 | 12 | 13 | 14 | 15 | 16 | 17 | 18 | 19 | 20 | Pts | Pos | 21 |
|---|---|---|---|---|---|---|---|---|---|---|---|---|---|---|---|---|---|---|---|---|---|---|---|---|---|
| 1 | (Sweden) (12) Björn Knutson | 15 | | | 3 | | | | | 3 | | 3 | | | 3 | | | | | | 3 | | 15 | 1 | |
| 2 | (Sweden) (1) Ove Fundin | 12 | 3 | | | | 3 | | | | 3 | | | | E | | | | 3 | | | | 12 | 2 | |
| 3 | (Sweden) (10) Göte Nordin | 12 | | | 2 | | | 3 | | | | | | 3 | | | 2 | | 2 | | | | 12 | 3 | |
| 4 | (Sweden) (13) Sören Sjösten | 10 | | | | 3 | 2 | | | | | | | 1 | | 2 | | | | | 2 | | 10 | 4 | |
| 5 | (Soviet Union) (14) Igor Plekhanov | 10 | | | | 2 | | 2 | | | | | 1 | | 2 | | | | | | | 3 | 10 | 5 | |
| 6 | (Sweden) (2) Arne Carlsson | 9 | F | | | | | 1 | | | | 2 | | | | 3 | | | | 3 | | | 9 | 6 | |
| 7 | (Poland) (3) Paweł Waloszek | 9 | 2 | | | | | | 1 | | | | 2 | | | | 3 | | | | 1 | | 9 | 7 | |
| 8 | (Sweden) (7) Rune Sörmander | 9 | | 2 | | | | | 2 | | | | | 2 | 1 | | | | | 2 | | | 9 | 8 | |
| 9 | (Poland) (11) Henryk Żyto | 7 | | | 1 | | | | 3 | | 0 | | | | | 1 | | | | | | 2 | 7 | 9 | |
| 10 | (Norway) (5) Aage Hansen | 7 | | 3 | | | 1 | | | | | 1 | | | | | 1 | | | | | 1 | 7 | 10 | |
| 11 | (Poland) (8) Marian Kaiser | 6 | | 0 | | | | | | 2 | | | 3 | | | 0 | | | 1 | | | | 6 | 11 | |
| 12 | (Poland) (9) Florian Kapała | 4 | | | 0 | | 0 | | | | | | 0 | | | | | 3 | | 1 | | | 4 | 12 | |
| 13 | (Czechoslovakia) (6) Luboš Tomíček Sr. | 3 | | 1 | | | | 0 | | | 2 | | | | | | | E | | | E | | 3 | 13 | |
| 14 | (Sweden) (15) Bengt Brannefors | 3 | | | | 1 | | | 0 | | | 0 | | | | | | 2 | E | | | | 3 | 14 | |
| 15 | (Poland) (16) Stanisław Tkocz | 2 | | | | F | | | | 1 | 1 | | | | | | 0 | | | 0 | | | 2 | 15 | |
| 16 | (Soviet Union) (4) Farid Szajnurov | 2 | 1 | | | | | | | 0 | | | | 0 | | | | 1 | | | | 0 | 2 | 16 | |
| Placing | Rider | Total | 1 | 2 | 3 | 4 | 5 | 6 | 7 | 8 | 9 | 10 | 11 | 12 | 13 | 14 | 15 | 16 | 17 | 18 | 19 | 20 | Pts | Pos | 21 |

m - exclusion for exceeding two minute time allowance • t - exclusion for touching the tapes • x - other exclusion • e - retired or mechanical failure • f - fell • ns - non-starter • nc - non-classify

| gate A - inside | gate B | gate C | gate D - outside |

== World Final ==
- 8 September 1962
- (England) Wembley Stadium, London
- Referee: C. H. King

| Placing | Rider | Total | 1 | 2 | 3 | 4 | 5 | 6 | 7 | 8 | 9 | 10 | 11 | 12 | 13 | 14 | 15 | 16 | 17 | 18 | 19 | 20 | Pts | Pos | 21 |
|---|---|---|---|---|---|---|---|---|---|---|---|---|---|---|---|---|---|---|---|---|---|---|---|---|---|
| 1 | (England) (14) Peter Craven | 14 | | | | 3 | | 2 | | | | | 3 | | 3 | | | | | | | 3 | 14 | 1 | |
| 2 | (New Zealand) (2) Barry Briggs | 13 | 1 | | | | | 3 | | | | 3 | | | | 3 | | | | 3 | | | 13 | 2 | |
| 3 | (Sweden) (10) Ove Fundin | 10 | | | 3 | | | 0 | | | | | | 1 | | | 3 | | 3 | | | | 10 | 3 | 3 |
| 4 | (Sweden) (6) Björn Knutson | 10 | | 3 | | | | 1 | | | E | | | | | | | 3 | | | 3 | | 10 | 4 | 2 |
| 5 | (New Zealand) (3) Ronnie Moore | 9 | 3 | | | | | | 3 | | | | E | | | | 2 | | | | 1 | | 9 | 5 | |
| 6 | (England) (9) Bob Andrews | 9 | | | 0 | | 3 | | | | | | 2 | | | | | 2 | | 2 | | | 9 | 6 | |
| 7 | (Scotland) (7) Ken McKinlay | 9 | | 2 | | | | | 2 | | | | | 3 | 2 | | | | | F | | | 9 | 7 | |
| 8 | (Sweden) (1) Göte Nordin | 9 | 2 | | | | 2 | | | | 2 | | | | 1 | | | | 2 | | | | 9 | 8 | |
| 9 | (Sweden) (4) Sören Sjösten | 8 | 0 | | | | | | | 3 | | | | 2 | | | | 1 | | | | 2 | 8 | 9 | |
| 10 | (Soviet Union) (11) Igor Plekhanov | 7 | | | 1 | | | | 1 | | 3 | | | | | 1 | | | | | | 1 | 7 | 10 | |
| 11 | (Sweden) (13) Rune Sörmander | 7 | | | | 2 | 1 | | | | | | | 0 | | 2 | | | | | 2 | | 7 | 11 | |
| 12 | (England) (12) Ron How | 6 | | | 2 | | | | | 2 | | 2 | | | 0 | | | | | | 0 | | 6 | 12 | |
| 13 | (Sweden) (16) Arne Carlsson | 3 | | | | 0 | | | | 0 | 1 | | | | | | 1 | | | 1 | | | 3 | 13 | |
| 14 | (Poland) (5) Paweł Waloszek | 2 | | 1 | | | 0 | | | | | 1 | | | | | 0 | | | | | 0 | 2 | 14 | |
| 15 | (England) (15) Mike Broadbank | 2 | | | | 1 | | | E | | | 0 | | | | | | 0 | 1 | | | | 2 | 15 | |
| 16 | (England) (8) Ron Mountford | 2 | | 0 | | | | | | 1 | | | 1 | | | 0 | | | 0 | | | | 2 | 16 | |
| R1 | (England) (R1) Nigel Boocock | 0 | | | | | | | | | | | | | | | | | | | | | 0 | R1 | |
| R2 | (Poland) (R2) Henryk Żyto | 0 | | | | | | | | | | | | | | | | | | | | | 0 | R2 | |
| Placing | Rider | Total | 1 | 2 | 3 | 4 | 5 | 6 | 7 | 8 | 9 | 10 | 11 | 12 | 13 | 14 | 15 | 16 | 17 | 18 | 19 | 20 | Pts | Pos | 21 |

m - exclusion for exceeding two minute time allowance • t - exclusion for touching the tapes • x - other exclusion • e - retired or mechanical failure • f - fell • ns - non-starter • nc - non-classify

| gate A - inside | gate B | gate C | gate D - outside |
