= 2027 SGB Championship =

Second tier of 2027 British speedway season

- League: SGB Championship
- No. of competitors: 9
- Champions: TBC
- Knockout Cup: TBC
- BSN Series: TBC
- Pairs: TBC
- Riders' Championship: TBC
- Highest average: TBC
- Division/s above: SGB Premiership
- Division/s below: 2027 NDL

The 2027 SGB Championship season will be the 80th season of the second tier of British Speedway and the 10th known as the SGB Championship.

Poole Pirates are the defending league and BSN Series champions, while Berwick Bandits are the defending Knockout Cup champions.

== Summary ==
The same nine clubs from 2026 will compete in the 2027 Championship. The format also remains the same with each team racing against each other twice (home and away), meaning a total of 16 league fixtures each during the season. The Knockout Cup and the BSN Series will also return, both following the same formats as in 2026.

The top four teams will qualify for the playoffs, staged over two semi-finals and a final. The points limit for team building remains at 40 points, although the rule enforcing only one rider above an 8 average in each team was scrapped.

Locations of the 2026 SGB Championship teams

== League ==
=== Regular season ===
| Pos. | Club | M | Home | | | Away | | | F | A | B | Pts | +/− |
| Pos. | Club | M | W | SHL | L | W | SHL | L | F | A | B | Pts | +/− |
|---|---|---|---|---|---|---|---|---|---|---|---|---|---|
| 1 | Berwick Bandits | | | | | | | | | | | | |
| 2 | Edinburgh Monarchs | | | | | | | | | | | | |
| 3 | Glasgow Tigers | | | | | | | | | | | | |
| 4 | Oxford Cheetahs | | | | | | | | | | | | |
| 5 | Plymouth Gladiators | | | | | | | | | | | | |
| 6 | Poole Pirates | | | | | | | | | | | | |
| 7 | Redcar Bears | | | | | | | | | | | | |
| 8 | Scunthorpe Scorpions | | | | | | | | | | | | |
| 9 | Workington Comets | | | | | | | | | | | | |

==== Fixtures and results ====
| Home \ Away | BER | EDI | GLA | OXF | PLY | POL | RED | SCU | WOR |
|---|---|---|---|---|---|---|---|---|---|
| Berwick | | – | – | – | – | – | – | – | – |
| Edinburgh | – | | – | – | – | – | – | – | – |
| Glasgow | – | – | | – | – | – | – | – | – |
| Oxford | – | – | – | | – | – | – | – | – |
| Plymouth | – | – | – | – | | – | – | – | – |
| Poole | – | – | – | – | – | | – | – | – |
| Redcar | – | – | – | – | – | – | | – | – |
| Scunthorpe | – | – | – | – | – | – | – | | – |
| Workington | – | – | – | – | – | – | – | – | |

Legend: Blue = home team win; Yellow = draw; Red = away team win.

=== Play Offs ===
**Semi Finals**
1
4
3
2

**Grand Final**

Home team scores are in bold
Overall aggregate scores are in red

=== Final ===
First Leg

October

–

Second Leg

October

–

== Knockout Cup ==
The 2026 SGB Championship Knockout Cup will be the 59th edition of the Knockout Cup for tier two teams and the 10th edition under the SGB Championship Knockout Cup name. Berwick Bandits are the defending champions.

**Round One**
Edinburgh Monarchs
Scunthorpe Scorpions

**Quarter Finals**
Edinburgh/Scunthorpe
Berwick Bandits
Glasgow Tigers
Redcar Bears
Poole Pirates
Oxford Cheetahs
Plymouth Gladiators
Workington Comets

**Semi Finals**

**Final**

Home team scores are in bold
Overall aggregate scores are in red

=== Final ===
First Leg

October

–

Second Leg

October

–

== BSN Series ==
Scottish Group

Fixtures

| Home \ Away | BER | EDB | GLA |
|---|---|---|---|
| Berwick | | - | - |
| Edinburgh | - | | - |
| Glasgow | - | - | |

Updated to match(es) played on unknown. Source:
Legend: Blue = home team win; Yellow = draw; Red = away team win.

Table

| Pos. | Club | M | Home | | | Away | | | F | A | B | Pts | +/− |
| Pos. | Club | M | W | D | L | W | D | L | F | A | B | Pts | +/− |
|---|---|---|---|---|---|---|---|---|---|---|---|---|---|
| 1 | Berwick Bandits | 0 | 0 | 0 | 0 | 0 | 0 | 0 | 0 | 0 | 0 | **0** | 0 |
| 2 | Edinburgh Monarchs | 0 | 0 | 0 | 0 | 0 | 0 | 0 | 0 | 0 | 0 | **0** | 0 |
| 3 | Glasgow Tigers | 0 | 0 | 0 | 0 | 0 | 0 | 0 | 0 | 0 | 0 | **0** | 0 |

Northern Group

Fixtures

| Home \ Away | RED | SCU | WOR |
|---|---|---|---|
| Redcar | | - | - |
| Scunthorpe | - | | - |
| Workington | - | - | |

Updated to match(es) played on unknown. Source:
Legend: Blue = home team win; Yellow = draw; Red = away team win.

Table

| Pos. | Club | M | Home | | | Away | | | F | A | B | Pts | +/− |
| Pos. | Club | M | W | D | L | W | D | L | F | A | B | Pts | +/− |
|---|---|---|---|---|---|---|---|---|---|---|---|---|---|
| 1 | Redcar Bears | 0 | 0 | 0 | 0 | 0 | 0 | 0 | 0 | 0 | 0 | **0** | 0 |
| 2 | Scunthorpe Scorpions | 0 | 0 | 0 | 0 | 0 | 0 | 0 | 0 | 0 | 0 | **0** | 0 |
| 3 | Workington Comets | 0 | 0 | 0 | 0 | 0 | 0 | 0 | 0 | 0 | 0 | **0** | 0 |

Southern Group

Fixtures

| Home \ Away | OXF | PLY | POL |
|---|---|---|---|
| Oxford | | - | - |
| Plymouth | - | | - |
| Poole | - | - | |

Updated to match(es) played on unknown. Source:
Legend: Blue = home team win; Yellow = draw; Red = away team win.

Table

| Pos. | Club | M | Home | | | Away | | | F | A | B | Pts | +/− |
| Pos. | Club | M | W | D | L | W | D | L | F | A | B | Pts | +/− |
|---|---|---|---|---|---|---|---|---|---|---|---|---|---|
| 1 | Oxford Cheetahs | 0 | 0 | 0 | 0 | 0 | 0 | 0 | 0 | 0 | 0 | **0** | 0 |
| 2 | Plymouth Gladiators | 0 | 0 | 0 | 0 | 0 | 0 | 0 | 0 | 0 | 0 | **0** | 0 |
| 3 | Poole Pirates | 0 | 0 | 0 | 0 | 0 | 0 | 0 | 0 | 0 | 0 | **0** | 0 |

Knockout stages

**Semi-finals**
'

**Final**

Home team scores are in bold
Overall aggregate scores are in red

=== Final ===
First Leg

October

–

Second Leg

October

–

== Pairs Championship ==
The 2027 edition of the SGB Championship Pairs is to be arranged. Oxford Cheetahs are the defending champions.

Qualifying heats

| Pos | Team | Pts | Riders |
|---|---|---|---|
| 1 | | | |
| 2 | | | |
| 3 | | | |
| 4 | | | |
| 5 | | | |
| 6 | | | |
| 7 | | | |
| 8 | | | |
| 9 | | | |

Semi-finals

| Team One | Team Two | Score | Result |
|---|---|---|---|
| | | - | |
| | | - | |

Final

| Team One | Team Two | Score | Result |
|---|---|---|---|
| | | - | |

== Riders' Championship ==
The 2026 edition of the SGB Championship Riders Championship is to be arranged. Josh Pickering is the defending champion.

| Pos. | Rider | Pts | Total | SF | Final |
|---|---|---|---|---|---|
| 1 | | | | | |
| 2 | | | | | |
| 3 | | | | | |
| 4 | | | | | |
| 5 | | | | | |
| 6 | | | | | |
| 7 | | | | | |
| 8 | | | | | |
| 9 | | | | | |
| 10 | | | | | |
| 11 | | | | | |
| 12 | | | | | |
| 13 | | | | | |
| 14 | | | | | |
| 15 | | | | | |
| 16 | | | | | |

== Squads ==
=== Berwick Bandits ===
- (Australia) Reid Battye
- (Australia) Jye Etheridge
- (England) Harry Fletcher
- (England) Drew Kemp
- (England) Jordan Jenkins
- (Australia) Nick Morris
- (Sweden) Victor Palovaara

=== Edinburgh Monarchs ===
- (England) Craig Cook
- (Sweden) Jonatan Grahn
- (Australia) Jordy Loftus
- (Australia) Kye Thomson
- (New Zealand) Ben Whalley

=== Oxford Cheetahs ===
- (England) Tom Brennan
- (England) Sam Hagon
- (England) Kyle Howarth
- (Australia) Luke Killeen
- (Australia) Sam Masters
- (England) Senna Summers
- (England) Ashton Vale

=== Poole Pirates ===
- (England) Will Cairns
- (England) Richard Lawson
- (England) Cooper Rushen

=== Redcar Bears ===
- (England) Jody Scott
- (England) Charlie Southwick
- (England) Charles Wright

=== Scunthorpe Scorpions ===
- (Australia) Jake Allen
- (England) Ryan Ingram
- (Australia) Josh Pickering
- (Australia) Tate Zischke

=== Workington Comets ===
- (Finland) Antti Vuolas

== See also ==
- List of United Kingdom speedway league champions
- Knockout Cup (speedway)
