= 1954 Southern Area League =

British motorcycle speedway season

- League: Southern Area League
- No. of competitors: 5
- Champions: California Poppies
- Riders' Championship: Alby Golden
- Highest average: Ernie Lessiter
- Division/s above: National League Div 1 National League Div 2

The 1954 Southern Area League was the first season of the newly named regional third tier of speedway racing in the United Kingdom for Southern British teams. It replaced the defunct Southern League. With most of the Southern League teams moving up to Speedway National League Division Two, six new teams started the season—many of them making their debut in league speedway.

== Summary ==
Three teams finished equal on points at the top but California Poppies from California, Berkshire were champions by the slenderest possible margin of a single race point with all their rivals having an fixture in hand that was never ridden.

Aldershot Shots withdrew mid-season. Ernie Lessiter of Ringwood topped the averages.

== Final table ==
Pos	Team	PL	W	D	L	Pts
1	California Poppies	16	9	0	7	18
2	Ringwood Turfs	15	9	0	6	18
3	Rye House Roosters	15	9	0	6	18
4	Brafield Flying Foxes	15	8	0	7	16
5	Eastbourne Eagles	15	3	0	12	6

Withdrawal (Record expunged) : Aldershot Shots

== Fixtures & results ==
=== A fixtures ===
Home \ Away	ALD	BFF	CAL	EAS	RIN	RYE
Aldershot		41–42	54–30	55–29	53–30	48–33
Brafield	55–29		48–36	50–33	48–36	46–37
California	53–31	47–36		57–27	38–45	38–46
Eastbourne	39–45	27.5–54.5	38–46		25–59	34–49
Ringwood	50–33	35–48	46–38	51–33		50–33
Rye House	44–39	49–34	47–37	60–22	51–33	

Legend: Blue = home team win; Yellow = draw; Red = away team win.

=== B fixtures ===
Home \ Away	BFF	CAL	EAS	RIN	RYE
Brafield		42–40	n/a	n/a	46–37
California	52–29		60–24	45–39	55–28
Eastbourne	47–31	34–49		41–37	38–43
Ringwood	53–26	47–37	50–29		50–34
Rye House	53–31	41–43	54–30	50–34	

Legend: Blue = home team win; Yellow = draw; Red = away team win.

== Leading Averages ==
	Rider	Team	C.M.A.
1	Ernie Lessiter	Ringwood	10.86
2	Gil Goldfinch	California	10.48
3	Jimmy Gleed	California	10.21
4	Peter Mould	California	9.83
5	Vic Hall	Brafield	9.46

== Riders' Championship ==
Alby Golden won the Riders' Championship. The final was held at Rye House Stadium on 3 October.

Pos.	Rider	Club	Pts
1	Alby Golden	Ringwood	14+3
2	Ernie Lessiter	Ringwood	14+2
3	Vic Ridgeon	Rye House	12
4	Dave Slater	Rye House	10
5	Fran Greasley	Brafield	10
6	Vic Hall	Brafield	8
7	Jimmy Gleed	California	7
8	Jack Taylor	Eastbourne	7
9	Pete Mould	California	6
10	Geoff Woodger	Rye House	6
11	Gil Goldfinch	California	6
12	Bob Bunney	Aldershot/Eastbourne	5
13	Bill Simpson (res)	Rye House	5
14	Ron Burnett	Aldershot	4
15	Syd George	Brafield	2
16	Eric Hockaday	California	2
17	Harry Wilson	Eastbourne	2
18	Gordon Richards (res)	Eastbourne/Ringwood	0

== Riders & final averages ==
Aldershot (withdrew)

- Jack Taylor 9.06
- Ron Burnett 9.00
- Eric Hockaday 8.33
- Bob Bunney 7.33
- Tommy Sweetman 7.08
- Frank Turner 6.24
- Peter Mason 5.58
- Jim Smith 4.50

Brafield

- Vic Hall 9.65
- Syd George 8.19
- Doug Jackson 8.00
- Frank Greasley 7.91
- Johnny Jones 7.17
- Brian Meredith 6.13
- John Cherry 4.84
- Tony Wintour 4.70
- Neil Roberts 4.50
- Nick Nicholls 3.76
- Dave Hankins 4.00
- Eric Eadon 3.33
- John Benson 0.80

California

- Gil Goldfinch 10.54
- Jimmy Gleed 10.29
- Pete Mold 9.83
- Bob Andrews 8.89
- Tommy Sweetman 6.62
- Eric Hockaday 6.40
- Ron Sharp 5.82
- George Bason 4.63
- Jim Webb 3.62
- Ted Pankhurst 3.53
- Ross Gilbertson 2.91
- Tom Albury 2.11
- Bob Mitchell 1.33

Eastbourne

- Harry Wilson 6.91
- Steve Bole 6.21
- Jim Preddy 5.67
- Dan English 5.57
- Johnny Fry 5.42
- Wally Wilson 5.26
- Bob Bunney 4.80
- Bob Gladwin 4.67
- Johnny Gronow 4.16
- Gordon Richards 2.40

Ringwood

- Ernie Lessiter 10.86
- Alby Golden 9.12
- Merv Hannam 8.63
- Gordon Richards 7.33
- Harold Carder 6.60
- Tom Worrall 5.73
- Tom Reader 5.69
- Tony Lockyer 6.56
- Gil Graham 5.00
- Ted Lewis 5.00
- Gerry Bridson 4.50
- Tony Golding 4.35

Rye House

- Vic Ridgeon 9.07
- Al Sparrey 8.00
- Jimmy Heard 7.65
- Bill Simpson 7.64
- Dave Clark 7.44
- Stan Bedford 6.97
- Dave Slater 6.95
- Geoff Woodger 6.19
- Vernon Brown 6.11
- Dave Still 6.07

== See also ==
- List of United Kingdom Speedway League Champions
- Knockout Cup (speedway)
