= SGB Premiership Riders' Individual Championship =

- Formerly: Elite League Riders' Championship
- Sport: Speedway
- Founded: 2017
- Country: United Kingdom
- Most recent champion: Jason Doyle

Notes
- division below Championship Riders' Championship

The SGB Premiership Riders' Individual Championship is an annual motorcycle speedway contest between the top riders (or two riders) with the highest average points total from each club competing in the top-tier league in the United Kingdom.

The same format of Championship applies for the tier two and tier three leagues, that of the SGB Championship Riders' Individual Championship (tier two) and National League Riders' Championship (tier three).

== History ==
The competition replaced the Elite League Riders' Championship in 2017.

== Winners ==
| Year | Venue | Winner | Team |
|---|---|---|---|
| 2017 | National Speedway Stadium | (Sweden) Fredrik Lindgren | Wolverhampton Wolves |
| 2018 | Poole Stadium | (Australia) Jason Doyle | Somerset Rebels |
| | not held from 2019 to 2024 | | |

== See also ==
- List of United Kingdom Speedway League Riders' champions
- Speedway in the United Kingdom
