= Premier League Riders Championship =

Premier League Riders' Championship
- Formerly: British League Riders' Championship (tier one - 1965–1994); British League Division Two Riders Championship (tier two - 1968–1994)
- Sport: Speedway
- Founded: 1995
- Country: United Kingdom

Notes
- replaced by Elite League Riders' Championship (tier one - 1997); SGB Championship Riders' Individual Championship (tier two - 2017)

The Premier League Riders Championship was a contest between the top riders with the highest average points total from each club competing in the Premier League in the United Kingdom.

== History ==
The championship was inaugurated in 1995, the same year that the Premier League was formed.

For its first two years, the Premier League was the top league in Britain. However, from 1997 it was the competition for the second tier, because the new Elite League had been formed.

In 2017, the Premier League became the SGB Championship and was duly renamed the SGB Championship Riders' Individual Championship.

== Winners ==
Year	Winner	Team
In 1995 and 1996 the Premier League was the top tier of British speedway
1995	(England) Gary Havelock	Bradford Dukes
1996	(United States) Sam Ermolenko	Sheffield Tigers
From 1997 the Premier League was the second tier of British speedway
1997	(England) Peter Carr	Edinburgh Monarchs
1998	(England) Glenn Cunningham	Peterborough Panthers
1999	(England) Sean Wilson	Sheffield Tigers
2000	(England) Carl Stonehewer	Workington Comets
2001	(England) Carl Stonehewer	Workington Comets
2002	(Australia) Adam Shields	Isle of Wight Islanders
2003	(England) Sean Wilson	Sheffield Tigers
2004	(England) Andre Compton	Sheffield Tigers
2005	(England) Sean Wilson	Sheffield Tigers
2006	(Sweden) Magnus Zetterström	Somerset Rebels
2007	(England) James Wright	Workington Comets
2008	(England) Tai Woffinden	Rye House Rockets
2009	(England) Ricky Ashworth	Sheffield Tigers
2010	(Denmark) Kenni Larsen	Newcastle Diamonds
2011	(Australia) Sam Masters	Somerset Rebels
2012	(England) Craig Cook	Edinburgh Monarchs
2013	(England) Oliver Allen	Rye House Rockets
2014	(England) Simon Stead	Sheffield Tigers
2015	(Denmark) Ulrich Østergaard	Peterborough Panthers
2016	(England) Simon Stead	Sheffield Tigers

== See also ==
- List of United Kingdom Speedway League Riders' champions
- Speedway in the United Kingdom
