= British Riders' Championship =

Speedway competition

- Sport: motorcycle speedway
- Founded: 1946
- Country: United Kingdom

Notes
- replaced by British League Riders' Championship

The British Riders Championship was an individual motorcycle speedway competition held in the United Kingdom for three years from 1946 until 1948. The competition was introduced after the Second World War in the absence of the World Championship and existed for three seasons. In 1949, the World Championship was re-introduced and so the competition was no longer run. After some pre-qualifying meetings, the final in each season was held at Wembley Stadium.

== History ==
The first winner was Tommy Price, who won the final held at Empire Stadium on 12 September 1946, in front of 85,000 spectators. There were no less than 23 qualifying rounds, where riders from National and Northern League tracks respectively, competed in six meetings each.

Jack Parker won the 1947 final held at Empire Stadium on 11 September. Parker won the title after a run off and also broke the halfway (2 laps) track record (37.6 secs) in heat 2. There were three qualifying rounds, with 28 riders progressing to the Championship round, held over seven meetings.

Vic Duggan won the 1948 Championship final held again at Empire Stadium on 16 September, in front of nearly 90,000 spectators.

== Results ==
Year	Winner	Team	2nd	Team	3rd	Team
1946	Tommy Price	Wembley Lions	Jack Parker	Belle Vue Aces	Bill Kitchen	Wembley Lions
1947	Jack Parker	Belle Vue Aces	Bill Kitchen	Wembley Lions	Bill Longley	New Cross Rangers
1948	Vic Duggan	Harringay Racers	Ron Johnson	New Cross Rangers	Alec Statham	Wimbledon Dons

== See also ==
- List of United Kingdom Speedway League Riders' champions
- Speedway in the United Kingdom
