= Alan Smith (speedway rider) =

British motorcycle speedway rider

- Born: 15 June 1930; Forest Gate, London, England
- Died: December 1999 (aged 69); London Borough of Newham, England
- Nationality: British (English)

Career history
- 1949–1954: Plymouth Devils
- 1954–1955: West Ham Hammers
- 1956, 1960: Rayleigh Rockets
- 1966: King's Lynn Stars
- 1966: Exeter Falcons

Team honours
- 1960: League champion (tier 2)
- 1952: National Trophy (tier 3)

Alan William Smith (15 June 1930 – December 1999) was a motorcycle speedway rider from England.

== Biography ==
Smith, born in Forest Gate, London, began his British leagues career riding for Plymouth Devils during the 1949 Speedway National League Division Three season. He spent a second season with the Devon club in 1950 before recording a season average of 10.84 in 1951. The average was not only the best for Plymouth but topped the entire division. He helped Plymouth win the National Trophy (tier 3) in 1952 and again surpassed a 10 average.

Mid-way through the 1953 season, Plymouth withdrew from the league, leaving their riders looking for new clubs. Smith was signed by West Ham Hammers. After two years at West Ham he switched to Rayleigh Rockets for the 1956 season. During the 1956 season, he caused controversy over the tyres he wanted to use, which resulted in over riders threatening to boycott the meeting and Smith withdrawing from it. The incident contributed towards Smith deciding to retire from the sport at the end of the season.

Smith made a return to speedway with Rayleigh under the promotion of Wally Mawdsley, for the 1960 Provincial Speedway League season and made an immediate impact, averaging 10.41 and helping Rayleigh become the Provincial League champions. Smith retired again after the 1960 season and Mawdsley signed his brother Billy for the team in 1961.

In 1966, Smith made another comeback, riding for the new King's Lynn Stars team and the Exeter Falcons team, during the 1966 British League season.
