= Nick Nicholls =

British motorcycle speedway rider

- Born: John Ivor Nicholls; 2 December 1936; Coventry England
- Died: 7 November 2013 (aged 76); Warwick, England
- Nationality: British (English)

Career history
- 1954–1955: Brafield Flying Foxes
- 1954–1961: Coventry Bees
- 1959: Oxford Cheetahs
- 1962: Belle Vue Aces
- 1962: Cradley Heathens

Team honours
- 1960: Midland Cup
- 1961: Central Shield

John Ivor "Nick" Nicholls (2 December 1936 – 7 December 2013) was an international motorcycle speedway rider from England. He earned five international caps for the England national speedway team.

== Biography ==
Nicholls, born in Coventry, started racing around the oval tracks during the second half events at Brandon Stadium. In 1954, he gained a place in the Coventry Bees team as an injury replacement but raced mainly for Brafield Flying Foxes during the 1954 Southern Area League season.

Nicholls cemented a place in the Coventry side for the 1955 season, helping the Midlands team secure the runner-up position in the league and in 1956 had improved his average to 6.40. From 1957 to 1959, Coventry competed in the top division, known as the National league at the time and Nicholls was a first team regular and also represented England against Australia. However, halfway through the 1959 season, he was loaned out to Oxford Cheetahs. In 1960, Oxford attempted to loan him again but Coventry told them he was not available.

Nicholls helped Coventry win the 1960 Midland Cup, before completing his eighth and last season with the club in 1961. His last season in speedway was shared between Belle Vue Aces in the National League and Cradley Heath Heathens in the Provincial League.
