= Rayleigh Weir Stadium =

Former multi-use stadium

- Location: Weir between Rayleigh and Thundersley; Essex; England
- Coordinates: 51°34′28″N 0°36′20″E
- Opened: 1948
- Closed: 1974

Rayleigh Weir Stadium was a speedway, greyhound racing and stock car stadium in Weir between Rayleigh and Thundersley in England.

It is not to be confused with the Rayleigh Greyhound Sports Stadium that existed in O’Tooles Meadow on Down Hall Road.

== Origins ==
In 1947 the area chosen for a new stadium was a small village called Weir between the small market town of Rayleigh and the district of Thundersley which was largely rural. It would be situated just six miles from Southend on the south side of the Southend Arterial Road. Opened on 25 March 1925, this particular stretch of road is of historical importance to the motoring world as it was the first road to be built in Britain specifically for motor vehicles. The new stadium could be accessed via Claydons Lane or Rat Lane.

The 1947 application by Francis Bernard McGreavey to the Benfleet Union was originally refused but later granted on appeal. McGreavey had made his fortune from building Morrison and Anderson shelters. The director of public prosecutions then took McGreavey (the builder and owner of the stadium) to court in 1949 because it was claimed that the application to construct the two grandstands had been approved in principle but later refused. However, the grandstands had been erected in-between which led to the prosecution. McGreavey argued that all material used was from government departments and the local authority had supported the application so he would appeal against the £2,000 fine issued. The appeal saw the fine reduced to £1,000.

== Speedway ==
Speedway began on 17 July 1948 with open meetings before the Rayleigh Rockets team were set up in 1949 and finished in 1973. The owners wanted to maximize the use of the venue and over the years it also hosted harness horse racing, open air wrestling, cycle speedway, midget cars and firework displays.

== Greyhound racing ==
=== Opening ===
The stadium opened to greyhound racing in March 1948 and just five months later a new totalisator was brought into the track. The track had a 450-yard circumference circuit with distances of 275, 510, 725 and 960 yards.

The stadium suffered during 1949, due to entertainment tax; general manager Frank Whelan publicly slammed the authorities over the tax. Losses of £5,000 on the speedway and £6,600 on greyhound racing led to a closure for a considerable part of 1950. McGreavey with his business partner Frederick Leslie Rundle filed for bankruptcy leaving the stadium without any direction. Two West Ham Stadium directors, Mr & Mrs Atkinson reacted by taking up the lease afterwards.

=== 1950s and 1960s ===
Racing settled into a Tuesday and Saturday night schedule during the 1950s and two buffet bars were available for the general public. During the 1960s the circuit was all-sand and the Saturday night meeting was replaced by Friday evenings with race distances of 290, 510, 740 and 960 yards. In 1965 the track became a National Greyhound Racing Club (NGRC) licensed venue and in 1969 the track was listed as the only NGRC approved all-sand surface. Totalisator turnover peaked in 1969 at £302,316.

The promoter was a Thomas Stanley who also covered the roles of general and racing manager. The resident kennels were situated at the track on the south side of the stadium which backed onto woods. The trainers attached to the track included Janet Tite, F Rayner, L Byrnes, John Edwards and Alec Taylor.

=== Track records ===
Yards	Greyhound	Time (sec)	Date	Motes/ref
290	Lunar Wonder	16.59	c.1968	
510	Fawn Poacher	28.70	c.1969	
740	Ewell Queen	43.00	c.1969	
960	Inexperience	57.37	1969	

== Stock car racing ==
Stock car racing was first staged at the stadium in August promoted by the man who bought the sport to the UK, Digger Pugh, until 1958. After that Bernie Tunney and Spedeworth had brief tenures too. Spedeworth ran for just five consecutive Saturday nights in 1962 starting on 4 August before winding up their use of the stadium on 1 September.

The track was originally scheduled to re-open for stock cars in spring 1967 but the closure of the ‘nearby’ (30 miles away) Custom House stadium at West Ham changed things. Rayleigh re-opened Saturday 6 August 1966 to fill the gap left by West Ham. Unfortunately the track had not had much attention owing to the rush to move fixtures and the racing surface cut up rather badly on the rain-soaked opening meeting.

The 1968 F2 Stock Car World Championship took place at the stadium on Saturday, 31 August. Christchurch racer Tom Pitcher won the 25 lap race from the outside of the front row with pole man Ian Durham in second from Cornishman John Marquand who had started fourth. The event had true international status with French racing pioneer Guy Curval coming home in 14th place ahead of his countryman Marcel Truffeaux. South African Paul Roussow and Dutchmen Henk Straver and Peiter Norlander were also programmed as starters in the 29 car field. As was a tradition at major races at the time the trophies were presented by a celebrity – in this case the successful professional boxer (and later actor) Billy Walker who had been British Amateur Champion.

In 1972, after a five-year absence, the promoter, Chick Woodroffe brought F1 Stock Cars back to Rayleigh. Three F1 meetings were staged with final wins going to Dave Chisholm (2) and Dick Sworder. Woodroffe also ran his own classes including Banger racing and Mini Rods.

== Closure ==
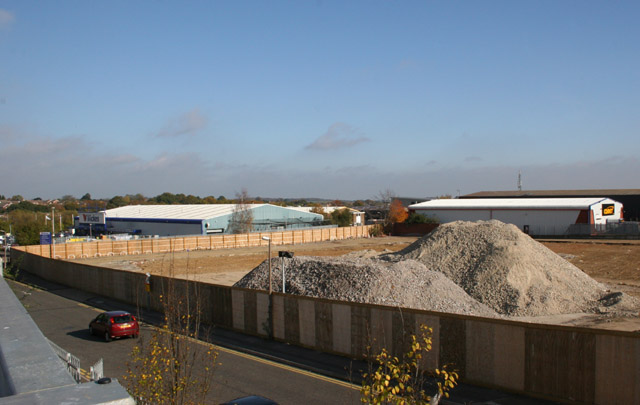
The site of the former stadium, now an industrial park

The promoter and stadium owner Thomas Stanley became unwell before negotiating the sale of the stadium during 1972. Stanley admitted that the offer for the 12-acre site was too good to refuse. The last stock car and speedway meetings took place at the end of 1973. On 8 March 1974 the last greyhound race meeting took place with the stadium being demolished and making way for a large trade and industrial park and more recently a retail park. The only trace of the venue is the road name, Stadium Way.
