= Jack Scott (speedway rider) =

Australian speedway rider (1934–2020)

- Born: 25 March 1934; Adelaide, Australia
- Died: 7 August 2020 (aged 86)
- Nationality: Australian

Career history
- 1959-1961: Southampton Saints
- 1961: Plymouth Bulldogs
- 1967: Cradley Heathens

Individual honours
- 1967: Australian Champion
- 1964, 1965: Victorian State Champion
- 1965, 1967: South Australian State Champion

Team honours
- 1961: Knockout Cup

John Devon Scott (25 March 1934 – 7 August 2020) was a motorcycle speedway rider from Australia. He earned seven international caps for the Australia national speedway team and one cap for the Great Britain national speedway team.

== Speedway career ==
Scott's breakthrough year was during the 1961 Speedway National League. Scott, averaged 8.80 for the season with Southampton, finishing third in the team's averages behind two of the world's leading riders, Björn Knutson and Barry Briggs. He also contributed to the Saints' second place finish and Knockout Cup success. Additionally, he averaged an impressive 11.08 for Plymouth Bulldogs in the 1961 Provincial Speedway League. In 1961, he became the first Provincial league rider to qualify for the World final.

Scott was champion of Australia when he won the 1967 Australian Championship.

Scott finished his British leagues career with the Cradley Heathens in 1967.
