= Reg Reeves =

British speedway rider

- Born: 6 August 1923; London, England
- Died: 1 September 1992 (aged 69); Braintree, Essex, England
- Nationality: British (English)

Career history
- 1949–1951: Walthamstow Wolves
- 1952: West Ham Hammers
- 1952–1953: Yarmouth Bloaters
- 1954–1955: Ipswich Witches
- 1960–1961: Rayleigh Rockets
- 1963: New Cross Rangers
- 1964–1965: Hackney Hawks

Individual honours
- 1961: Provincial Riders' Champion
- 1960, 1961: Leading average

Team honours
- 1960: Provincial League Champion

Reginald Reeves (6 August 1923 – 1 September 1992) was a speedway rider from England.

== Speedway career ==
Reeves rode in the top two tiers of British Speedway from 1949 to 1965, riding for various clubs. In 1960 and 1961, he returned the leading average in the Provincial League, when riding for the Rayleigh Rockets. Also in 1961, he won the Provincial Riders' Championship.

== Family ==
Reeves' son Eddie was also a speedway rider.
