= Ringwood Raceway =

Motorsport venue in Hampshire, England

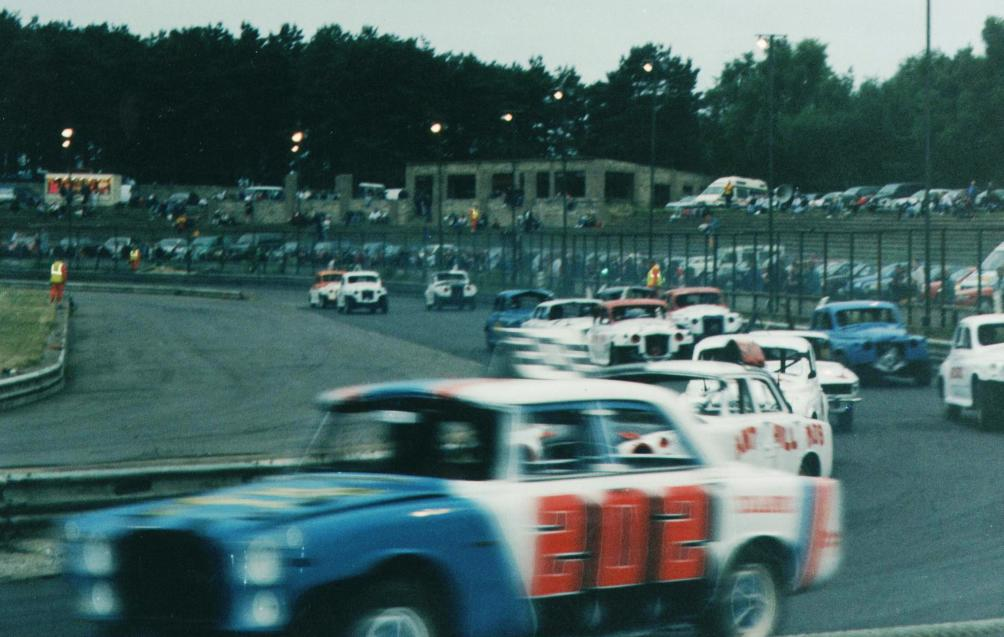
- Banger racing at the Raceway
- Location: St Leonards, Ringwood, Hampshire, BH24 2BT
- Coordinates: 50°48′27″N 1°49′12″W
- Opened: 1946

The Ringwood Raceway (formerly known as Matchams Park Stadium) is a motorsport venue in Ringwood, Hampshire, England. The site is located in St Leonards, Dorset off the Hurn Road and Matchams Lane.

== History ==
After World War II, a motorcycle speedway circuit was constructed on the site. During the 1946 and 1947 seasons the site known as Matchams Park Stadium and operated on an open speedway licence. The track was referred to as a training school in 1950 and the stadium was also used for cars in 1950.

Open speedway licence meetings were once again held at the venue from 1951 to 1953 but on a different circuit within the site. A team called the Ringwood Turfs entered league competition for the first time in 1954. The following season in 1955, the team withdrew in late June and had their results expunged.

Further open meetings and training took place sporadically with a last recorded training and long track meetings in 1993. The site continued banger racing, until its planned closure in 2022. Racing continued after 2022 as plans for the retirement village that were going to replace the raceway did not go ahead.

== Future ==
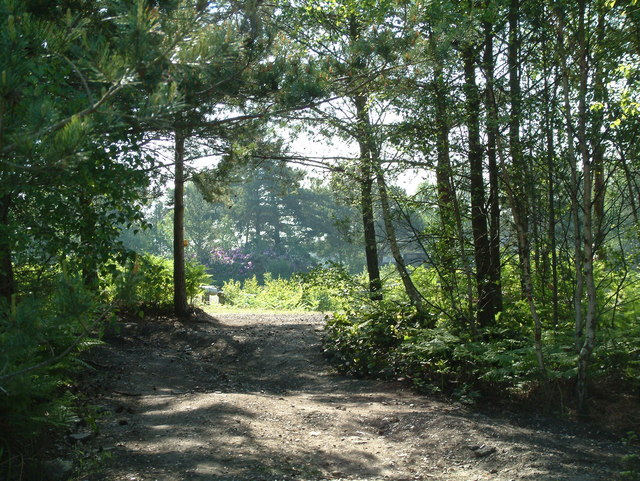
Matcham's Park at the northern edge of the raceway.

Future development of the site is pending council approval. A retirement community is planned to be built. Consultation for redevelopment began in October 2021.
