= Ringwood Speedway =

British motorcycle speedway team

Club information
- Track address: Matcham Park Stadium; St Leonards; Ringwood; Hampshire, BH24 2BU
- Country: England
- Founded: 1937
- Closed: 1993

Ringwood Speedway were a British motorcycle speedway team who operated between 1937 and 1993, they were based at Matchams Park Stadium (modern day Ringwood Raceway) off Hurn Road in Ringwood, Hampshire.

== History ==
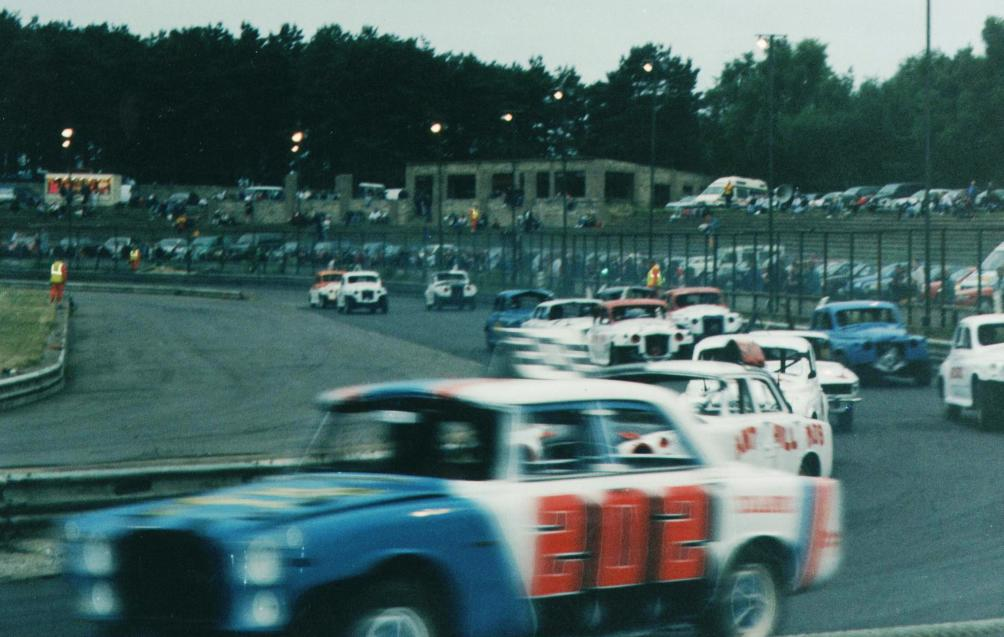
Stock cars at Matcham Park Stadium, the site of speedway in the 1950s

The origins of Ringwood Speedway were solely grasstrack. The Motorcycle and Light Car Club raced grasstrack meetings at the Mount in Poulner. The events from 1929 until the outbreak of World War II were extremely popular. In May 1936, the club moved from the Mount to the Midgham Speedway near Fordingbridge and then later to Corfe Mullen.

After the war, the traditional oval form of racing arrived at a venue in St Leonards, Dorset off the Hurn Road and Matchams Lane. During the 1946 and 1947 seasons the site known as Matchams Park Stadium operated on an open licence.

The track was referred to as a training school in 1950 and the stadium was also used for cars in 1950.

Open licence meetings returned to the venue between 1951 and 1953, although they were staged on a different circuit within the grounds.

A team called the Ringwood Turfs entered league competition for the first time in 1954. Their debut 1954 Southern Area League season ended with a 2nd-place finish, thanks in part to the consistent riding of Ernie Lessiter and Alby Golden.

The following season in 1955, the team withdrew in late June and had their results expunged.

Further open meetings and training took place sporadically with a last recorded training and long track meetings in 1993.

== Season summary ==
Year and league	Position	Notes
1954 Southern Area League	2nd	
1955 Southern Area League	N/A	withdrew, results expunged

== See also ==
- Ringwood Raceway
