= SGB Championship Riders' Individual Championship =

Annual motorcycle speedway contest

- Formerly: Premier League Riders Championship
- Sport: Speedway
- Founded: 2017
- Country: United Kingdom

Notes
- Division above Premiership Riders' Championship; Division below National League Riders' Championship

The SGB Championship Riders' Championship is an annual motorcycle speedway contest between the top riders (or two riders) with the highest average points total from each club competing in the SGB Championship.

It determines British speedway's second tier riders champion.

== Format ==
The same format of Championship applies for the tier one and tier three leagues, that of the SGB Premiership Riders' Individual Championship (tier one) and National League Riders' Championship (tier three).

== History ==
The competition replaced the Premier League Riders Championship in 2017.

== Winners ==
Year	Winner	Team	Ref
2017	(Australia) Nick Morris	Berwick Bandits	
2018	(England) Craig Cook	Glasgow Tigers	
2019	(Germany) Erik Riss	Redcar Bears	
2020 & 2021 cancelled due to the COVID-19 pandemic
2022	(Australia) Sam Masters	Edinburgh Monarchs	
2023	(England) Charles Wright	Redcar Bears	
2024	(Australia) Josh Pickering	Edinburgh Monarchs	
2025	(England) Chris Harris	Glasgow Tigers	
2026	(Australia) Josh Pickering	Scunthorpe Scorpions	

== See also ==
- List of United Kingdom Speedway League Riders' champions
- Speedway in the United Kingdom
