= Rayleigh Rockets =

Former British speedway team

Club information
- Track address: Rayleigh Weir Stadium; Southend Arterial Road; Rayleigh; Essex
- Country: England
- Founded: 1949
- Closed: 1973

Club facts
- Colours: Blue and Yellow
- Track size: 365 yards (334 m)

Major team honours
Southern League Champions	1952, 1953
Provincial League Champions	1960

The Rayleigh Rockets were a Speedway team which operated from 1949 until their closure in 1973 from the Rayleigh Weir Stadium in Rayleigh, Essex .

== History ==
=== Origins and 1940s ===
In June 1948, the Speedway Control Board granted a permit for speedway to be held at the recently constructed Rayleigh Weir Stadium. The first was a challenge match on 17 July 1948. The following season the club organised a training school for novices and Messrs. Greavey and Rundle entered a team (the Rockets) into the 1949 Speedway National League Division Three.

During the Rockets inaugural league season they finished in 12th place.

=== 1950s ===
After two more seasons in Division Three (1950 and 1951) they joined the Southern League (which was a new name for the third division). The club became champions of the league during the 1952 Speedway Southern League season, with riders Jack Unstead, Gerry Jackson and New Zealander Peter Clark all averaging over 9 and the team winning the league title by ten clear points.

Despite the loss of Jack Unstead to Bristol Bulldogs, the Rockets retained their league title during the 1953 Speedway Southern League season, with Jackson and Clark particularly prominent. In 1954 Rayleigh were in division 2 and they struggled, finishing last but improved dramatically to 3rd the following season with largely the same riders.

Another strong season resulted in 1956 but in 1957 the leagues were re-organised and Rayleigh found themselves in the top division for the first time. The team failed to strengthen sufficiently and only managed five wins that season. The following season, promoter Vic Gooden decided to take over the promotion at Poole Pirates and transferred the entire team, leaving Rayleigh with no speedway.

=== 1960s ===
The Rockets re-opened again in 1960 under the promotion of Wally Mawdsley and rider Pete Lansdale. The team entered the Provincial League (the second division of speedway at the time). The Rockets top two riders, Reg Reeves and Alan Smith were instrumental in helping Rayleigh win their third piece of silverware, after winning the 1960 Provincial Speedway League title. After a fifth place finish in 1961, speedway ended again because of falling gates and rider wage demands.

In 1964, the Rockets entered a regional Metropolitan League but this was the last league racing seen until 1968, when Len Silver took over as promoter. The team returned for the 1968 British League Division Two season, finishing 5th in both 1968 and 1969, the latter season saw New Zealander Graeme Smith star.

=== 1970s ===
The Rockets rode at the stadium until the end of the 1973 season, when it was announced that the stadium had been sold to developers and the Rockets would need to find a new home. Len Silver moved the promotion to Hoddesdon in Hertfordshire to start the 1974 season as a new team called the Rye House Rockets.

The former site of Rayleigh Stadium is now a retail park. Many former Rayleigh fans supported the Essex speedway team, the Lakeside Hammers, who raced at the Arena Essex Raceway, next to the Lakeside Shopping Centre, until their closure in 2018.

== Season summary ==
Year and league	Position	Notes
1949 Speedway National League Division Three	12th	
1950 Speedway National League Division Three	9th	
1951 Speedway National League Division Three	4th	
1952 Speedway Southern League	1st	champions
1953 Speedway Southern League	1st	champions
1954 Speedway National League Division Two	11th	
1955 Speedway National League Division Two	3rd	
1956 Speedway National League Division Two	3rd	
1957 Speedway National League	11th	
1960 Provincial Speedway League	1st	champions
1961 Provincial Speedway League	5th	
1968 British League Division Two season	5th	
1969 British League Division Two season	5th	
1970 British League Division Two season	12th	
1971 British League Division Two season	5th	
1972 British League Division Two season	4th	
1973 British League Division Two season	18th	

== Notable riders ==
- (New Zealand) Peter Clark
- (England) Gerry Jackson
- (England) Pete Lansdale
- (England) Les McGillivray
- (England) Reg Reeves
- (England) Alan Smith
- (New Zealand) Graeme Smith
- (England) Jack Unstead
