= Pete Lansdale =

British motorcycle speedway rider (1912–1993)

- Born: 26 December 1912; Marylebone, London, England
- Died: 13 September 1989 (aged 76)
- Nationality: British (English)

Career history
- 1947: Southampton Saints
- 1948–1950, 1952–1954: Plymouth Devils
- 1951: Walthamstow Wolves
- 1954–1957, 1960: Rayleigh Rockets
- 1958–1959: Poole Pirates
- 1961–1963: Exeter Falcons

Team honours
- 1952: National Trophy (tier 3)
- 1960: Provincial League Champion
- 1962: National Trophy (Provincial Level)

Harry Douglas Lansdale (26 December 1912 – 24 June 1993) was a motorcycle speedway rider and promoter from England.

== Biography ==
Lansdale, born in Marylebone, London on 26 December 1912, was riding speedway bikes during the 1930s but began his British leagues career riding for Southampton Saints, during the 1947 Speedway National League Division Three season. The following season he was signed by Plymouth Devils and topped the team's averages after recording 9.06 for the season.

Following on from his successful 1948 season, Lansdale recorded the third best average in the entire division, posting an impressive 10.29. Despite the team moving up to division two, he remained the team's best rider averaging 9.48. Plymouth returned to division 3 in 1951, but Lansdale spent the season with Walthamstow Wolves and once again was the leading rider for his team.

Lansdale finally won silverware to reflect his performances, after returning to Plymouth and helping them win the National Trophy (tier 3). He built up a reputation at Plymouth and became a solid fan's favourite, riding for them until the team pulled out of the league in 1954. He consequently joined Rayleigh Rockets and for the next four years rode for the club despite his advancing years.

Lansdale rode a few times for Poole Pirates during 1958 and 1959 before returning to Rayleigh in 1960. He finished his career with Exeter Falcons from 1961 to 1963 and at the age of 49 topped the Exeter averages.

Just before retiring, Lansdale also went into management and promoting, where he was especially connected to Wally Mawdsley and as a pair promoted at various clubs. His first major venture was with the team he was still riding for (Exeter) at the County Ground Stadium in 1960. Lansdale and Mawdsley took over at Newport Wasps in 1969, following Mike Parker relinquishing his interest at the Welsh club.

The pair introduced the Romford Bombers to British speedway in 1969.
