= Vic Duggan =

Australian speedway rider

- Born: 16 October 1910; West Maitland, Australia
- Died: 24 March 2007 (aged 96); Queensland, Australia
- Nationality: Australian

Career history
- 1937: Hackney Wick Wolves
- 1938: Bristol Bulldogs
- 1939: Wimbledon Dons
- 1947–1950: Harringay Racers

Individual honours
- 1941, 1947, 1948 (2 + 3 Lap): Australian Champion
- 1940, 1947: NSW State Champion
- 1947: London Riders' Champion
- 1948: British Riders' Champion

Team honours
- 1939: London Cup Winner
- 1948: Anniversary Cup Winner

Victor John Duggan (16 October 1910, West Maitland, New South Wales – 24 March 2007, Queensland) was a motorcycle speedway racer who won the London Riders' Championship in 1947 whilst with the Harringay Racers.

== Career ==
Duggan started his career in 1937 with the Hackney Wick Wolves, before spells with the Bristol Bulldogs in 1938 and Wimbledon Dons in 1939. In 1947, he returned to the UK with the Harringay Racers. Was a co-director of the Sydney Sports Ground with Lionel Van Praag and Max Grosskreutz where he held the track record.

Duggan won his first Australian Solo Championship in 1941 at the Sydney Sports Ground. He followed this up with the 1947 Aussie title, again at the Sports Ground and backed up to win three Aussie titles in 1948 (2 x 2 lap and 1 x 3 lap) at both the Sports Ground and the Sydney Showground Speedway. He was also NSW State Champion in 1940 and 1947. Many believe Vic would have won more Australian and NSW titles had it not been for World War II when racing was suspended.

Duggan competed in the British Riders' Championship in 1947 and 1948. This competition was held in place of the Individual Speedway World Championship between 1946 and 1948. He was favourite to win in 1947 but fell in his fourth race and did not start his fifth. He won the title in 1948 with 14 points, the final was held at Empire Stadium on 16 September, in front of nearly 90,000 spectators.

On 20 January 1950, Duggan's brother Ray Duggan was killed at the Sydney Sports Ground after being involved in a high-speed crash with friend Norman Clay. Clay also died from his injuries. Later that year, Duggan competed in the 1950 World Final at London's, Wembley Stadium where he finished in 13th place after scoring four points.

Duggan died of natural causes following a seizure on 24 March 2007, in a hospital in Queensland.

== World Final Appearances ==
- 1950 – (England) London, Wembley Stadium – 13th – 4pts
