= Brian Craven =

British motorcycle speedway rider

- Born: 21 March 1932; Liverpool, England
- Died: 24 April 1993 (aged 61)

Career history
- 1950, 1960: Liverpool Chads/Pirates
- 1954–1957: Belle Vue Aces
- 1959: Yarmouth Bloaters
- 1961: Stoke Potters
- 1962–1963, 1965–1966: Newcastle Diamonds

Team honours
- 1961: Northern League

Brian Anthony Craven (21 March 1932 – 24 April 1993) was a motorcycle speedway rider from England.

== Biography ==
Craven, born in Liverpool, joined the Liverpool Chads winter training school, aged just 17 and performed well enough to earn a team place in the senior side. He began his British leagues career riding for the Chads during the 1950 Speedway National League Division Three season. Despite breaking into the team during the season, he would not ride the following season with Liverpool because he was undergoing his National Service in the British Army and his brother Peter Craven took possession of his bike.

In 1954, Craven's return to speedway did not go to plan, he joined Belle Vue Aces but struggled and failed to break into the first team, where his brother Peter was the leading rider. He also suffered a bad injury, breaking his arm and collarbone in a crash.

It was not until the 1956 season that Craven began to ride regularly and posted an improved league average of 6.29 for the season and reaching the final of the National Trophy.

After missing the 1958 season, Craven joined Yarmouth Bloaters in 1959 before speedway returned to Stanley Stadium in Liverpool again in 1960, with new team name of Liverpool Pirates. Craven raced for the Pirates until the end of the season, when speedway in Liverpool ended for good.

Craven's career began to finally blossom from 1961 onwards, he averaged 8.64 for Stoke Potters during the 1961 Provincial Speedway League season and then 9.60 for Newcastle Diamonds in 1962, where he topped the team averages. He also reached the British Final round of the 1962 Individual Speedway World Championship.

Craven remained at Newcastle but missed the 1964 season following the tragic death of his brother Peter. He retired after the 1966 season.

== Personal life ==
Craven had four sisters and an younger brother, Peter Craven, who was a two time speedway champion of the world.
