= Illerstadion =

Association football and athletics stadium in Kempten, Germany

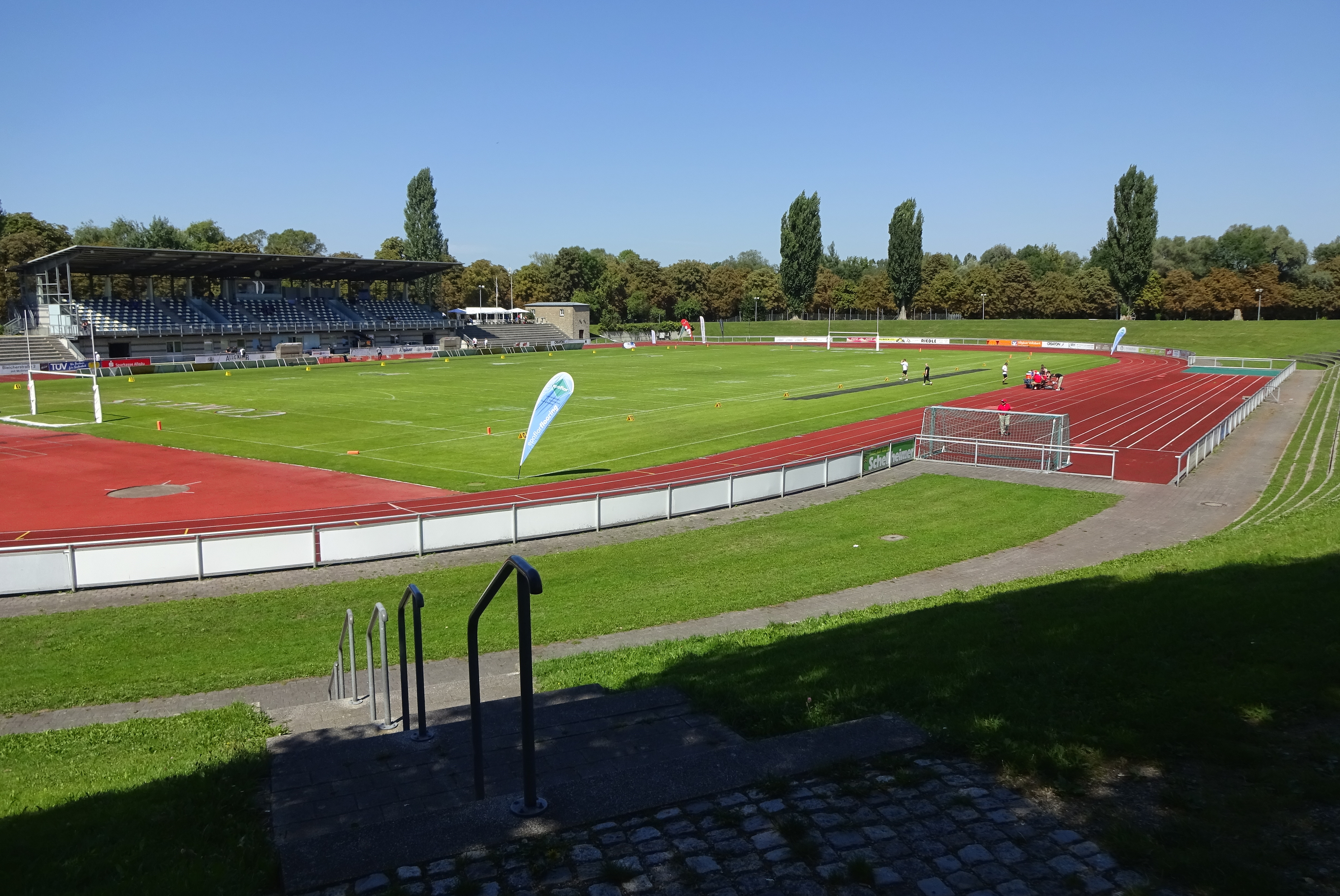
- Location: Illerdamm 10, 87437 Kempten (Allgäu), Germany
- Coordinates: 47°43′50″N 10°19′10″E
- Capacity: 9,000
- Opened: 1938

The Illerstadion is a 9,000 capacity multi-use stadium in Kempten, Germany. The stadium is located on the Illerdamm 10 road, on the east side of the River Iller in the northern area of the town. The stadium hosts the football team FC Kempten and the American football team the Allgäu Comets and also has facilities for athletics.

== History ==
The first plans for a stadium next to the river were submitted by Otto Merkt in 1919. However, it was not until 1938 that the city council received plans from the planning officer Maximilian Vicari that construction began. The plans included 5,600 standing room, a small-caliber shooting range, facilities for high jump, shot put, pole vault and parking for 200 cars.

In 1939, the playing field and a cinder motorcycle speedway track were added. The main stand was completed in 1949 and the large standing stand wall and marathon gate were completed in 1956. It then had a 12,500 capacity.

In 1965, the stadium hosted arguably what was its most significant event, the final of the 1965 Speedway World Team Cup. It later hosted the inaugural 1968 Speedway World Pairs Championship. Between 1979 and 1986, the speedway track was demolished, two synthetic pitches, two new grass fields and a sand grass pitch were created.

In 1995, the main square and sand track were converted and expanded into an athletics competition track. The stadium was further modernised in 1999/2000.
