= Wally Mawdsley =

British motorcycle speedway rider and manager

- Born: 30 November 1926; Salford, Greater Manchester, England
- Died: 12 February 2009 (aged 82); Canterbury, England
- Nationality: British (English)

Career history
- 1949: Rayleigh Rockets
- 1950: Plymouth Devils

Walter Mawdsley (30 November 1926 – 12 February 2009) was a motorcycle speedway rider, manager and promoter from England. He was the team manager of the England national speedway team from to 1983 to 1984.

== Biography ==
Mawdsley, born in Salford, Greater Manchester, was a despatch rider during World War II. He began his British leagues career riding for Rayleigh Rockets during the 1949 Speedway National League Division Three season. It was the inaugural league season of speedway at Rayleigh organised by Messrs. Greavey and Rundle. The following season in 1950, Plymouth Devils signed Mawdsley on a free transfer from Norwich Stars, who held his contract. His riding career was underwhelming, averaging a best 4.58 in 1949.

Mawdsley finished racing after the 1951 season but would later decide to concentrate on promoting. His first major venture was with Exeter Falcons at the County Ground Stadium in 1960, where he promoted the team with Pete Lansdale. Mawdsley and Lansdale took over at Newport Wasps in 1969, following Mike Parker relinquishing his interest at the Welsh club.

The pair introduced the Romford Bombers to British speedway in 1969 and then Mawdsley helped revive the Bristol Bulldogs in 1977. Ventures followed at Hull (with Ian Thomas), Mildenhall, West Ham, Plymouth, Weymouth, Swindon and Cantebury.

Mawdsley served as chairman of the BSPA and was the manager of the England team 1983 to 1984.
