= Geoff Mudge =

Former Australian motorcycle speedway rider

- Born: 30 September 1935 (age 91); Adelaide, Australia
- Nationality: Australian

Career history
- 1960: Southampton Saints
- 1960–1970: Poole Pirates
- 1971–1972: Reading Racers
- 1973–1974: Newport Wasps
- 1975–1976: Exeter Falcons

Team honours
- 1968: World Pairs silver medal
- 1969: British League Champion
- 1961, 1962: Provincial League Champion
- 1962, 1963, 1964: Provincial Southern League Champion
- 1972, 1974: Spring Gold Cup Winner

Geoffrey Allen Mudge (born 30 September 1935) is a former international motorcycle speedway rider from Australia. He earned 10 international caps for the Australia national speedway team and one cap for the Great Britain national speedway team.

== Speedway career ==
Mudge won a silver medal during the Speedway World Pairs Championship in the 1968 Speedway World Pairs Championship. The medal was won under a Great Britain vest when Oceania riders were allowed to represent Britain.

Mudge first rode in the British leagues for Poole Pirates in 1960. he demanded a transfer away from Poole in 1970.

Mudge rode in the top tier of British Speedway from 1960 to 1976, riding for various clubs.

When he finished racing for Reading Racers after the 1972 season, Mudge announced his retirement but would later return.

== World Final appearances ==
=== World Pairs Championship ===
- 1968 - (West Germany) Illerstadion, Kempten (with Ray Wilson) - 2nd - 21pts
