= Clive Featherby =

British motorcycle speedway rider

- Born: 6 April 1933; Kings Lynn, England
- Died: 28 August 2019 (aged 86); Brisbane, Australia
- Nationality: British (English)

Career history
- 1958–1960: Norwich Stars
- 1960: Yarmouth Bloaters
- 1960, 1966: Cradley Heathens
- 1961–1965: Sheffield Tigers
- 1967–1972: King's Lynn Stars

Team honours
- 1962, 1963, 1964: Northern League Winner

Clive G. C. Featherby (6 April 1933 – 28 August 2019) was an international motorcycle speedway rider from England. He earned one international cap for the Great Britain national speedway team.

== Biography ==
In 1959, Featherby was signed by the Norwich Stars manager Gordon Parkins after impressing in a try out. He moved on to Yarmouth Bloaters and then Stoke Potters and Cradley Heathens all during 1960.

It was not until 1961 that Featherby found stability, signing for Sheffield Tigers for the 1961 Provincial Speedway League and produced a 9.59 average for the season. The following season he performed even better, recording the second best average in the league at 10.21 and becoming Sheffield's leading rider and captain.

Following five successful seasons at Sheffield, Featherby was forced to join Cradley Heath for the 1966 British League season due to the restrictions imposed on teams by the Control Board. He spent an unhappy season at the club before joining the King's Lynn Stars in 1967.

Featherby ended his career at King's Lynn in 1972, after six years with the West Norfolk club. His last race was in May 1972 because of a badly broken leg, suffered during a World Championship qualifying round. His son Craig Featherby later became a professional speedway rider but was killed in a speedway league crash during 1983.
