= Ernie Lessiter =

British motorcycle speedway rider (1929 – 2001)

- Born: 12 August 1929; Paddington, London, England
- Died: 17 December 2001 (aged 72); Oxford, England
- Nationality: British (English)

Career history
- 1952: Oxford Cheetahs
- 1954: Ringwood Turfs
- 1955–1958, 1960: Swindon Robins
- 1955: Weymouth Scorchers
- 1961: Wolverhampton Wolves

Team honours
- 1957: League champion (tier 1)
- 1956: League champion (tier 2)

Ernest Archibald Herbert Lessiter (12 August 1929 – 17 December 2001) was a motorcycle speedway rider from England.

== Biography ==
Lessiter, born in Paddington, London, began his British leagues career riding for Oxford Cheetahs during the 1952 Speedway National League Division Two season. His novice season was a disappointment because he could only record a one-point average and this resulted in him not riding the following season.

In 1954, Lessiter made a comeback and improved dramatically by not only topping the team averages for his new club Ringwood Turfs but recording the highest average of the entire division, with an impressive 10.86. The following season, he moved up to division 2 to join the Weymouth Scorchers but the Weymouth team withdrew after just seven league fixtures. This forced Lessiter to find another club and he joined the Swindon Robins.

Lessiter enjoyed four consistent seasons at Swindon from 1955 to 1958 and helped the team win the National League division 2 title in 1956 and then the division 1 title in 1957. Towards the latter part of the 1958 season, Lessiter announced his intention to retire. He participated in some grasstrack meetings during 1959 before returning for a few rides for Swindon in 1960. His final season was in 1961, when he rode six matches for the Wolverhampton Wolves.
