= Alby Golden =

British speedway rider

- Born: 14 March 1931; Lyndhurst, Hampshire, England
- Died: 18 July 2004 (aged 73); Southampton, Hampshire
- Nationality: British (English)

Career history
- 1954: Ringwood Turfs
- 1955–1963: Southampton Saints
- 1964–1969: Newport Wasps
- 1969–1970: Eastbourne Eagles

Individual honours
- 1954: Southern Area League Riders' Championship

Team honours
- 1962: National League
- 1961: National Trophy
- 1956: National Trophy (tier 2)
- 1964: National Trophy (Provincial League level)

Albert Edward Stanley Golden (14 March 1931 – 18 July 2004) was a motorcycle speedway rider from England.

== Career ==
Golden started his British leagues career for Ringwood and Southampton reserves in 1953 and then progressed to the Ringwood Turfs first team. During the 1954 Southern Area League season, he impressed by winning the Southern Area League Riders' Championship.

The following season, Golden joined Southampton Saints for the 1955 Speedway National League Division Two season. He would ride for them for nine seasons and became a fan's favourite. During his time at Southampton he won the National Trophy Division 2 final in 1956 and the National Trophy in 1961 but his finest moment was winning the league title with the club during the 1962 Speedway National League season.

Unfortunately, Banister Court Stadium closed in 1963, which forced Southampton to fold and led Golden to sign for Newport Wasps in the 1964 Provincial Speedway League. He represented Newport in the British League Riders' Championship during the 1965 British League season and later became the captain of the team. After six seasons with the Welsh club he joined Eastbourne Eagles in 1969. His final season was for Eastbourne in 1970, but he broke his leg in a match and retired from the sport.

Golden also earned one international cap for the Great Britain national speedway team against the Soviet Union.

== Personal life ==
Golden was shipyard worker in Marchwood, for 37 years.
