= List of United Kingdom Speedway League Riders' champions =

British motorcycle speedway competitions

The List of United Kingdom Speedway League Riders' Champions is the list of individual riders who have won the United Kingdom's League Riders' Championship that corresponded to the relevant league at the time. The list is split into three divisions, the top tier, the second tier and third tier, all three divisions have been known in various guises such as National League, Premier League, Elite League and many more. This list gives a complete listing of the winners for each season.

During some years there was only one or two divisions.

== Riders' Championships (chronological order) ==
=== Tier One ===
- British Riders' Championship 1946–1948
- British League Riders' Championship 1965–1994
- Premier League Riders Championship 1995–1996
- Elite League Riders' Championship 1997–2016
- SGB Premiership Riders' Individual Championship 2017–present

=== Tier Two ===
- National League Division Two Riders' Championship 1954
- Southern Area League Riders' Championship 1957–1959
- Provincial League Riders' Championship 1960-1964
- British League Division Two Riders Championship 1968-1994
- Academy League Riders' Championship 1995
- Conference League Riders' Individual Championship 1996
- Premier League Riders Championship 1997–2016
- SGB Championship Riders' Individual Championship 2017–present

=== Tier Three ===
- National League Division Three Riders' Championship 1950–1951
- Southern Area League Riders' Championship 1954–1956, 1960
- British League Division Three Individual Championship 1994
- Conference League Riders' Individual Championship 1997–2008
- National League Riders' Championship 2009–present

== List of Winners ==
Year	Tier one	Year	Tier two	Year	Tier three
1946	Tommy Price	1946	N/A	1946	N/A
1947	Jack Parker	1947	N/A	1947	N/A
1948	Vic Duggan	1948	N/A	1948	N/A
1949	N/A	1949	N/A	1949	N/A
1950	N/A	1950	N/A	1950	Pat Clark
1951	N/A	1951	N/A	1951	Ken Middleditch
1954	N/A	1954	Ken Middleditch	1954	Alby Golden
1955	N/A	1955	N/A	1955	Mike Broadbank
1956	N/A	1956	N/A	1956	Leo McAuliffe
1957	N/A	1957	Leo McAuliffe	1957	N/A
1959	N/A	1959	Dave Hankins	1959	N/A
1960	N/A	1960	Trevor Redmond	1960	Ross Gilbertson
1961	N/A	1961	Reg Reeves	1961	N/A
1962	N/A	1962	Len Silver	1962	N/A
1963	N/A	1963	Ivan Mauger	1963	N/A
1964	N/A	1964	Ivan Mauger	1964	N/A
1965	Barry Briggs	1965	N/A	1965	N/A
1966	Barry Briggs	1966	N/A	1966	N/A
1967	Barry Briggs	1967	N/A	1967	N/A
1968	Barry Briggs	1968	Graham Plant	1968	N/A
1969	Barry Briggs	1969	Geoff Ambrose	1969	N/A
1970	Barry Briggs	1970	Dave Jessup	1970	N/A
1971	Ivan Mauger	1971	John Louis	1971	N/A
1972	Ole Olsen	1972	Phil Crump	1972	N/A
1973	Ivan Mauger	1973	Arthur Price	1973	N/A
1974	Peter Collins	1974	Carl Glover	1974	N/A
1975	Peter Collins	1975	Laurie Etheridge	1975	N/A
1976	Ole Olsen	1976	Joe Owen	1976	N/A
1977	Ole Olsen	1977	Colin Richardson	1977	N/A
1978	Ole Olsen	1978	Steve Koppe	1978	N/A
1979	John Louis	1979	Ian Gledhill	1979	N/A
1980	Les Collins	1980	Wayne Brown	1980	N/A
1981	Kenny Carter	1981	Mike Ferreira	1981	N/A
1982	Kenny Carter	1982	Joe Owen	1982	N/A
1983	Erik Gundersen	1983	Steve McDermott	1983	N/A
1984	Chris Morton	1984	Ian Barney	1984	N/A
1985	Erik Gundersen	1985	Neil Middleditch	1985	N/A
1986	Hans Nielsen	1986	Paul Thorp	1986	N/A
1987	Hans Nielsen	1987	Andrew Silver	1987	N/A
1988	Jan O. Pedersen	1988	Troy Butler	1988	N/A
1989	Shawn Moran	1989	Mark Loram	1989	N/A
1990	Hans Nielsen	1990	Andy Grahame	1990	N/A
1991	Sam Ermolenko	1991	Jan Stæchmann	1991	N/A
1992	Joe Screen	1992	Róbert Nagy	1992	N/A
1993	Per Jonsson	1993	Gary Allan	1993	N/A
1994	Sam Ermolenko	1994	Paul Bentley	1994	Andy Howe
1995	Gary Havelock	1995	Kevin Little	1995	N/A
1996	Sam Ermolenko	1996	Mike Hampson	1996	N/A
1997	Greg Hancock	1997	Peter Carr	1997	Jon Armstrong
1998	Tony Rickardsson	1998	Glenn Cunningham	1998	Steve Bishop
1999	Jason Crump	1999	Sean Wilson	1999	Jonathan Swales
2000	Ryan Sullivan	2000	Carl Stonehewer	2000	Scott Pegler
2001	Jason Crump	2001	Carl Stonehewer	2001	David Mason
2002	Tony Rickardsson	2002	Adam Shields	2002	James Birkinshaw
2003	Lee Richardson	2003	Sean Wilson	2003	Barrie Evans
2004	Bjarne Pedersen	2004	Andre Compton	2004	James Wright
2005	Nicki Pedersen	2005	Sean Wilson	2005	Steve Boxall
2006	Jason Crump	2006	Magnus Zetterström	2006	Adam Roynon
2007	Nicki Pedersen	2007	James Wright	2007	Tai Woffinden
2008	Jason Crump	2008	Tai Woffinden	2008	Benji Compton
2009	Leigh Adams	2009	Ricky Ashworth	2009	Craig Cook
2010	Fredrik Lindgren	2010	Kenni Larsen	2010	Lee Smart
2011	Rory Schlein	2011	Sam Masters	2011	Jason Garrity
2012	Chris Holder	2012	Craig Cook	2012	Ashley Birks
2013	Rory Schlein	2013	Oliver Allen	2013	Steve Boxall
2014	Troy Batchelor	2014	Simon Stead	2014	Danny Halsey
2015	Jason Doyle	2015	Ulrich Østergaard	2015	Ben Morley
2016	Fredrik Lindgren	2016	Simon Stead	2016	Max Clegg
2017	Fredrik Lindgren	2017	Nick Morris	2017	Dan Bewley
2018	Jason Doyle	2018	Craig Cook	2018	Ben Morley
2019	not held	2019	Erik Riss	2019	Anders Rowe
2020	cancelled due to COVID-19	2020	cancelled due to COVID-19	2020	cancelled due to COVID-19
2021	not held	2021	cancelled due to COVID-19	2021	cancelled due to COVID-19
2022	not held	2022	Sam Masters	2022	Jordan Jenkins
2023	not held	2023	Charles Wright	2023	Connor Bailey
2024	not held	2024	Josh Pickering	2024	not held
2025		2025	Chris Harris	2025	not held
