= Peter Jarman =

English speedway rider

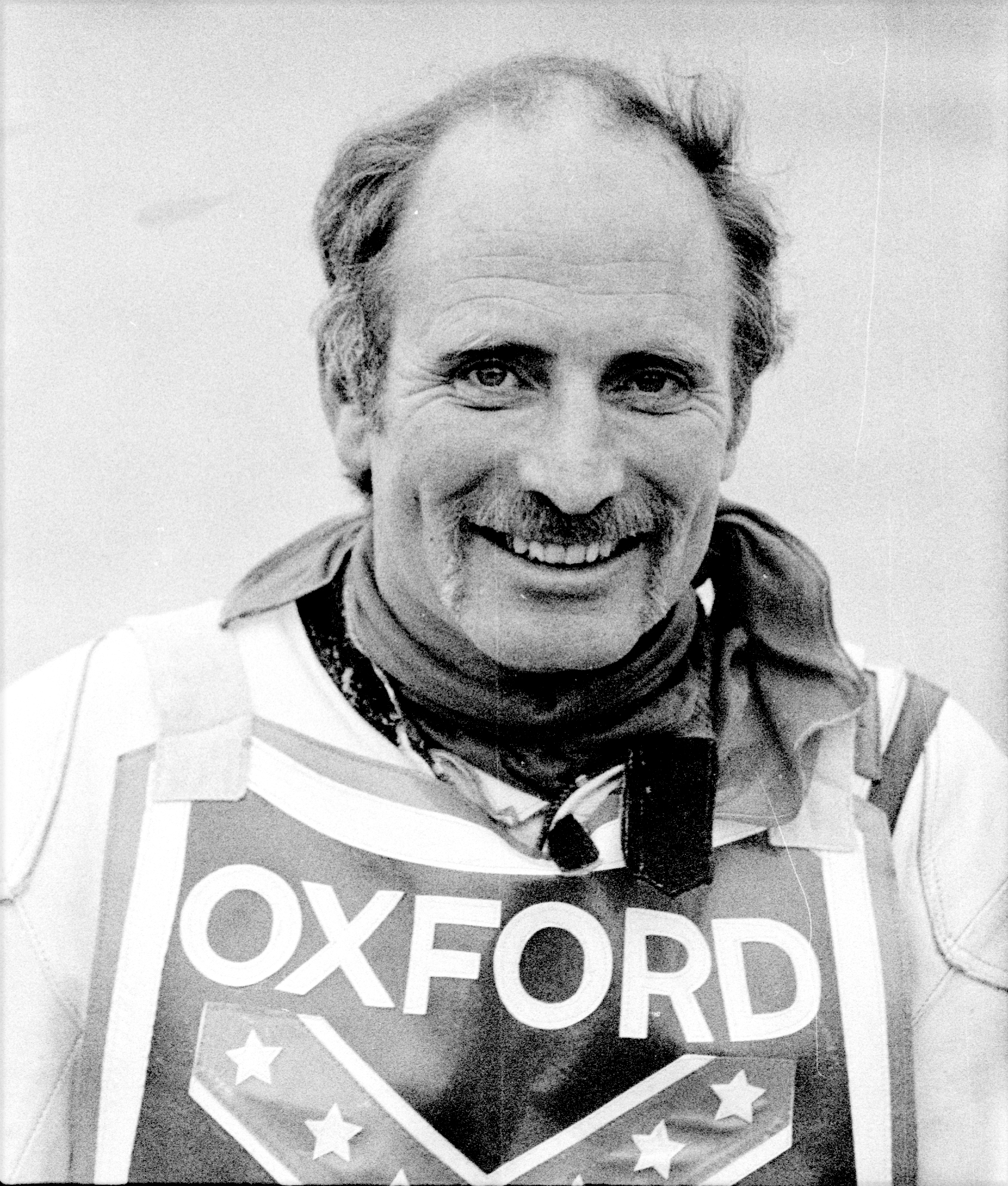
- Born: 30 June 1935; Brockley, London, England
- Died: 23 July 2007 (aged 72)
- Nationality: British (English)

Career history
- 1959, 1974–1977: Eastbourne Eagles
- 1960–1963: Stoke Potters
- 1964–1968: Wolverhampton Wolves
- 1969–1970, 1974: Oxford Cheetahs/Rebels
- 1971–1973: Cradley Heathens/United

Individual honours
- 1964: Pride of the Midlands winner

Team honours
- 1977: National League Winner
- 1975, 1977: NL KO Cup

Peter Edward Jarman was a motorcycle speedway rider from England.

== Career ==
Jarman started as a cycle speedway 'kid' in the 1950s and graduated to the motorised sport of speedway racing at training track Rye House, Hertfordshire. He was signed up for league racing in 1960 by Stoke Potters speedway team, racing in the newly formed Provincial League between 1960 and 1963. It was while he was at Stoke that he gained his first call-up to represent England in Test Matches. He gained two nicknames – 'Speedy Pete' and 'PLJ' (Pure Lemon Juice) Kid.

When the Stoke Potters speedway and greyhound Sun Street Stadium was sold for development at the end of 1963, Jarman moved on to join Wolverhampton Wolves in the 1964 Provincial League, where he was their top scorer both in 1964 and 1965, in the new British League. As the Wolves top scorer, he represented them in the British League Riders' Championship during the 1965 British League season.

Jarman later rode for Cradley Heathens and Oxford Rebels.

Jarman returned to Eastbourne Eagles in 1974 and would ride for them for four seasons, becoming the club captain and then doubling up as the team coach before ending his riding career with the Eagles in 1977.

== Retirement ==
Jarman ran a Speedway School at Cowley Stadium in the mid-1970s. In the late 1970s, he moved from his roots of South London to Poole and became the track curator at Poole Speedway for several years. He represented his country on three occasions. He was a popular, hard-working rider throughout his career.

Jarman died of non-Hodgkin lymphoma on 23 July 2007, aged 72 (not 75 as some sources quote), and his funeral was on 6 August in Poole. He had struggled with cancer over the previous ten years. He was survived by his wife, Ann, two sons and two daughters.

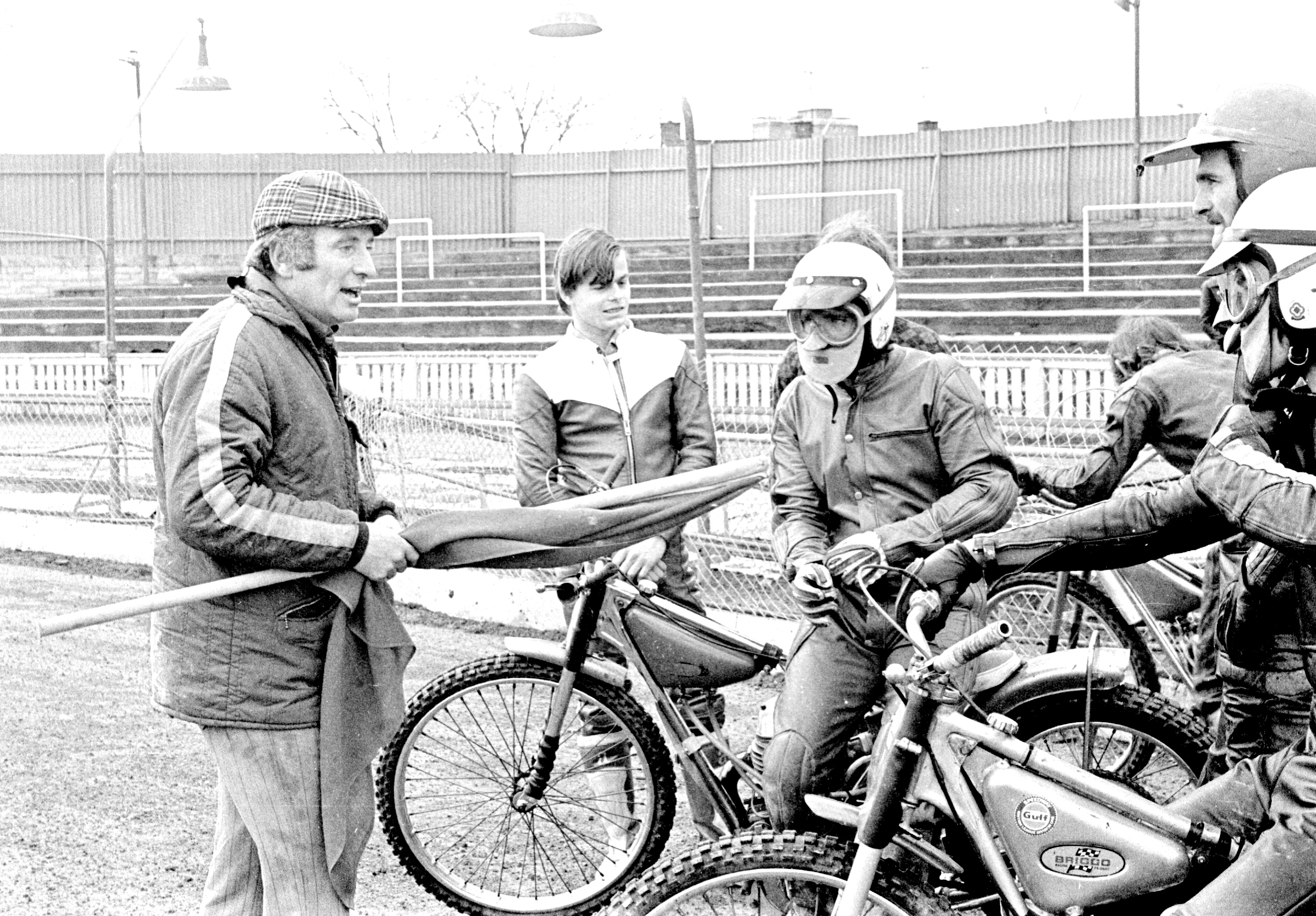
Jarman coaching novices

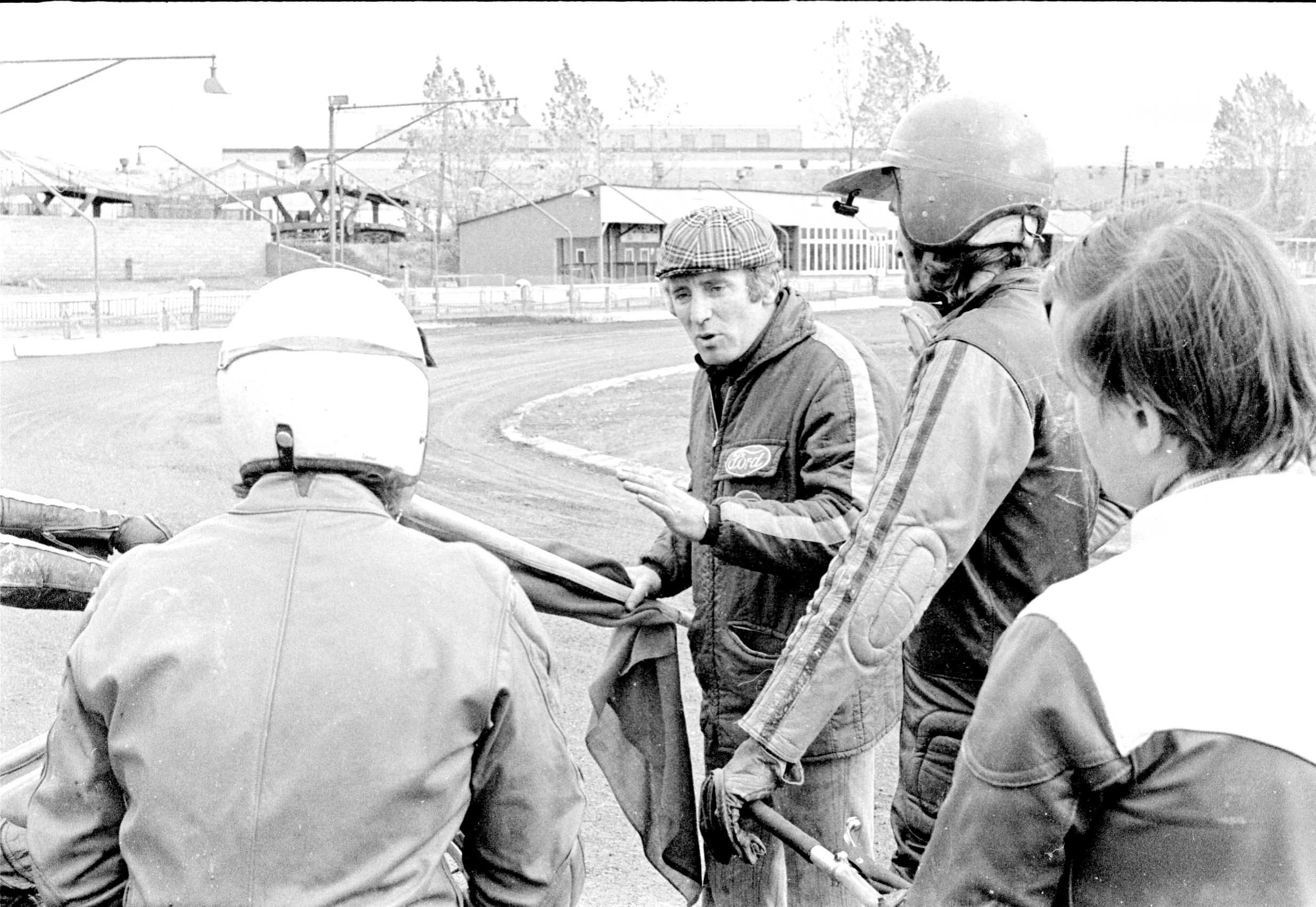
