= Len Silver =

British speedway rider and promoter (1932–2024)

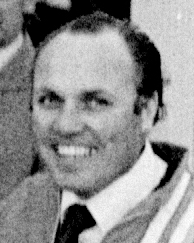
- Silver in 1976
- Born: 2 February 1932; London, England
- Died: 13 October 2024 (aged 92)
- Nationality: British (English)

Career history
- 1953-1957, 1960-1962: Ipswich Witches
- 1961-1964: Exeter Falcons
- 1964: Hackney Hawks

Individual honours
- 1962: Provincial League Riders' Champion

Team honours
- 1962: Provincial League KO Cup Winner

Leonard George Silver (2 February 1932 – 13 October 2024) was an English motorcycle speedway rider and promoter. He has also served as the Team Manager for the England and Great Britain national speedway team during two separate spells in 1976 and 1981.

== Racing career ==
Silver began racing for Ipswich Witches during the 1953 Speedway Southern League season. During his maiden season he was described as a star discovery.

Silver continued to ride for the Witches until he stopped racing in 1957 but returned to the club in 1960 after a layoff due to injury. In 1961, he was transferred to Exeter, where he skippered the Exeter Falcons. In 1962, he won the Provincial League Riders' Championship, held at Hyde Road on 22 September, in front of 20,000 spectators.

Silver made ten successful defences of the Silver Sash Match Race Championship. In 1964, he transferred to the Hackney Hawks as a rider/promoter (the latter with Mike Parker) but his riding career was cut short by serious injuries after a first bend crash at Hackney shortly after joining.

== Promoting career ==
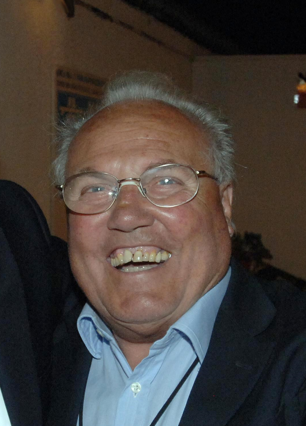
Silver in 2007

Silver continued as Hackney's promoter and manager until the demise of the Hawks in 1983, and also promoted at Hackney's sister track Rye House. As part of Allied Presentations, he also promoted at the Rayleigh Rockets, Weymouth Wildcats, Crewe Kings, Sunderland Stars and the Reading Racers. He also spent a season as promoter of the Eastbourne Eagles from the 1980s until 1994.

Silver became owner of Rye House Stadium in 2000 and returned to Rye House Speedway as team owner, promoting the Rye House Rockets in the Premier League and the Rye House Cobras in the Conference League. He co promoted the Kent Kings at Sittingbourne.

Silver is considered to be one of speedway's most colourful and controversial characters and was once banned by the Speedway Control Board from "taking any part in a speedway meeting" during the 1976 season after an altercation with a referee.

Silver was the track curator at Wembley stadium for the 1981 World Final.

Silver served several terms on the British Speedway Promoters' Association management committee.

== Retirement and death ==
In 2021, Silver announced his retirement from speedway management. He died on 13 October 2024, at the age of 92.
