= Tony Lewis (speedway rider) =

British motorcycle speedway rider

- Born: 6 June 1923; Bournemouth, England
- Died: 6 October 1997 (aged 74)
- Nationality: British (English)

Career history
- 1950–1955, 1960–1964, 1967–1968: Poole Pirates
- 1965: Exeter Falcons
- 1965: West Ham Hammers

Team honours
- 1952, 1955, 1961, 1962: League champion (tier 2)
- 1951: League champion (tier 3)
- 1952, 1955: National Trophy (tier 2)
- 1962, 1963, 1964: Provincial Southern League Champion

Alfred Edward Lewis (6 June 1923 – 6 October 1997) was a motorcycle speedway rider from England.

== Biography ==
Lewis, born in Bournemouth, raced on local grasstracks before being offered a contract by Poole Pirates manager Sid Hazzard in 1949. He began his British leagues career riding for Poole during the 1950 Speedway National League Division Three season. The following season in 1951, he was part of the team that secured the league title.

Lewis would ride for Poole for 13 seasons, spanning the years 1950 to 1968 and would become a club legend. During his time at Poole, he helped them win the League title four times, 1952, 1955, 1961 and 1962, in addition to the National Trophy in 1952 and 1955. His most serious injury was in 1955, when he fractured his skull during a tour of Sweden. The crash nearly cost him his life and he missed four years of speedway.

Lewis averaged 10.43 and 10.32 during the 1960 and 1961 seasons respectively, and scored 2,435 points over 339 appearances for Poole.
