= Ivor Brown (speedway rider) =

English speedway rider

- Born: 30 May 1927; Wymeswold, Leicestershire, England
- Died: 30 March 2005 (aged 77)
- Nickname: Hovis, The Brown Bomber
- Nationality: British (English)

Career history
- 1953-1959: Leicester Hunters
- 1958-1960: Yarmouth Bloaters
- 1961-1968: Cradley Heathens

Individual honours
- 1961 (4x), 1962 (8x), 1963 (5x): Provincial Lge MRC Silver Sash

Team honours
- 1961, 1963: Provincial League KO Cup Winner
- 1963: Provincial Midland League Winner

Ivor John Brown (30 May 1927 – 30 March 2005) was a motorcycle speedway rider from England. He was the captain of Cradley Heathens speedway team during the 1960s. He earned one international cap for the England national speedway team. After retiring from riding, he became promoter of Long Eaton and Scunthorpe speedway. His off-track occupation was postmaster and grocer of the village General Stores in Wymeswold.

== Career ==
=== Racing ===
Born in Wymeswold, Leicestershire, Brown started speedway racing at Long Eaton in 1952, following earlier grasstrack riding, and moved to second-half rides at Birmingham and then Leicester. He made a few team appearances for Leicester Hunters between 1953 and 1959, but it was at Yarmouth that he first made regular team appearances, when he was skipper of the Yarmouth Bloaters team in the Southern Area League and the 1960 inaugural Provincial League competition, scoring 176 points from 18 matches.

With the closure of Yarmouth, Brown transferred to Cradley Heath Heathens for 1961. He topped the Provincial League averages and led the team to three Knockout Cup finals (including two wins) in four years. In 1965, and the formation of an amalgamated British League, he sustained serious injuries to his lower spine at the Wimbledon Internationale in a clash with Ove Fundin. Although he returned to racing the same season, his subsequent form suffered at this level and, with further injuries, he retired at the end of the 1968 season. In eight seasons at Cradley, he averaged close to ten points per match. He was a regular holder of the Silver Sash, the Provincial League match race championship.

=== Promoting ===
In 1969, Brown re-opened the speedway at Long Eaton Stadium, with a new team name Long Eaton Rangers.

Brown died in 2005. A trophy named in his honour was contested in a challenge match between the successors to two of his former clubs, the Leicester Lions and the Dudley Heathens, in 2011.
