= Speedway in the United Kingdom =

Overview of the motorcycle sport in Britain

The sport of speedway in the United Kingdom has changed little since the first meetings in the 1920s. It has three domestic leagues, its own Speedway Grand Prix, and an annual entry into the Speedway World Cup / Speedway of Nations.

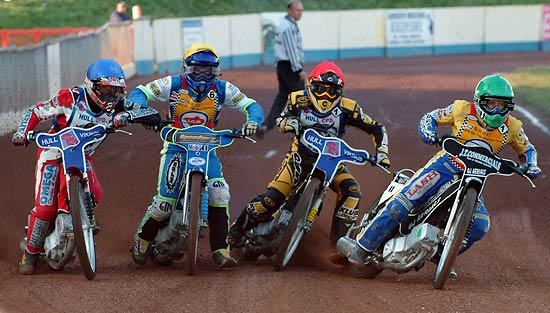
Riders from a Hull Vikings vs. Isle of Wight Islanders British Premier League meeting in 2005

== History ==
Several meetings have been claimed to be the first in the UK. The meeting at High Beech on 19 February 1928, a meeting organized by R.J. Hill-Bailey of the Ilford Motor Cycle Club which attracted an estimated 30,000 spectators, is often described as the first British speedway meeting. There were, however, also meetings in 1927 in Camberley in Surrey and Droylsden near Manchester. Despite being described as 'the first British Dirt Track meeting' at the time, the meeting at Camberley on 7 May 1927 differed in that the races were held in a clockwise direction. Races at Droylsden, the first held on 25 June 1927, were held in an anti-clockwise direction and this meeting appears to have a strong claim to be the first Speedway meeting in the UK, but it is generally accepted that the sport properly arrived in the UK when Australians Billy Galloway and Keith McKay arrived with the intention of introducing Speedway to the Northern Hemisphere. Both featured in the 1928 High Beech meeting.

It is probable however that the first speedway meeting in the UK to feature bikes with no brakes and broadsiding round corners on loose dirt, probably the main tests of real speedway, was the second meeting held at High Beech on 9 April, where Colin Watson, Alf Medcalf and 'Digger' Pugh demonstrated the art for the first time in Britain.

The sport boomed in the early days with new tracks opening in England, Scotland, and Wales. Notable pioneer venues of 1928 were Stamford Bridge and Celtic Park. The sport contracted in the early 1930s but revived just before the war. A few tracks, notably Belle Vue, Manchester operated in these dark days and the end of the war signalled activity at a number of tracks such as Perry Barr in Birmingham, Odsal Stadium in Bradford, Brough Park in Newcastle, Owlerton in Sheffield, Cleveland Park in Middlesbrough and White City in Glasgow. The World Championship of Speedway was staged at Wembley Stadium, London from 1936 to 1960.

A post war boom came to an end in the early 1950s thanks to television and Entertainment Tax but a revival with the advent of the Provincial League in 1960 has been largely sustained ever since.

== Governing body ==
The Speedway Control Bureau (SCB), in conjunction with the British Speedway Promoters' Association (BSPA), part of the Auto-Cycle Union who oversee all forms of track racing, govern the domestic leagues in the United Kingdom. International events are directly governed by the Fédération Internationale de Motocyclisme (FIM).

== Green sheet averages ==
Green Sheet Averages are a list of riders Calculated Match Averages (CMA) issued or assessed periodically by the British Speedway Promoters' Association (BSPA) and are used to determine the riders averages for team building. They are called Green Sheet Averages as traditionally they are printed on green paper.

For both the SGB Premiership and SGB Championship there is a points limit in place for team building purposes. This points limit is created to prevent teams becoming too powerful, therefore creating a competitive league. All Elite League and Premier League teams must declare 7 riders before the start of the season. For the 2008 Elite League, the combined averages of the 7 riders must not have exceeded 38.85, which increased to 39.9 for the 2009 season. A 2008 Premier League team's combined average must not have exceeded 41.5, increasing to 42.5 the following season. At the start of a season, a rider retains their last recorded CMA (or assessed CMA if they have never previously established one) until they have competed in six home and six away matches. A new CMA is then issued that comes into effect seven days later.

== Competitions ==
In the early days of speedway in the UK, meetings consisted of individual tournaments, scratch and handicap races. Team contests were introduced and became popular with supporters, leading to the introduction of the Southern Inter-track League (later the Southern League) in 1929, featuring teams of four riders competing over six heats, with two riders from each team in each heat. This soon changed to teams of six competing over nine heats and the scoring system of three points for a win, two for second, and one for third was introduced. 'Star' riders were initially banned from the league, but demand from supporters saw this rule relaxed. Northern tracks soon joined together to form the English Dirt Track League, but the league was beset with problems, with many fixtures not completed and several teams dropping out during the season. The following year it was renamed the Northern League.

The closure of several tracks led the remaining teams to come together in the National League, which continued as the main league until 1964, with a hiatus during World War II. In 1960 a group of promoters, dissatisfied with how the league was being run formed the Provincial League. This ran from 1960 to 1964. 1963 Provincial League champions Wolverhampton Wolves' refusal to accept promotion to the National League brought tensions to a head, with Provincial League teams threatened with suspension by the ACU. An RAC commission of enquiry led to the two leagues merging in 1965 to form the British League. Initially a single division, interest from new teams led to the creation of a second division in 1968. In 1975 this was renamed the New National League, the following year becoming the National League. In 1991 it reverted to the Division Two name and continued until 1994, after which the British League ended with the formation of the single-division Premier League. In 1997, with more teams wanting to join the league and to attract money from television coverage, the Elite League was formed as new top tier of ten teams, with the Premier League continuing as a second tier.

The need to develop new talent led to the creation of the British League Division Three in 1994, which became the Academy League in 1995, but proved to be financially unviable and in 1996 it was replaced with the amateur Conference League. This was renamed in 1997 as the British Amateur League, but it was replaced with a revised Conference League in 1998 which was not limited to amateurs and allowed Premier League riders with averages below 4.5 to compete. In 2009 the regulations were altered again and the Conference League was replaced by the National League, the third league to use that name.

=== Current competitions ===
==== League ====
- SGB Premiership

British speedway's First Division

- SGB Championship

British speedway's Second Division

- National Development League

British speedway's Third Division

==== Cup ====
- SGB Premiership Knockout Cup

The First Division Knockout Cup competition

- SGB Championship Knockout Cup

The Second Division Knockout Cup competition

- National League Knockout Cup

The Third Division Knockout Cup competition

==== Pairs ====
- SGB Premiership Pairs

The top two riders from each First Division club, compete to become Pairs Champions

- SGB Championship Pairs Championship

The top two riders from each Second Division Club, compete to become Pairs Champions

- National League Pairs Championship

The top two riders from each Third Division Club, compete to become Pairs Champions

==== Individual ====
- Speedway Grand Prix of Great Britain

The British round of the Speedway World Championship, held at the National Speedway Stadium

- British Speedway Championship

The top British riders compete to become British Champion

- British Speedway Under 21 Championship

The top British riders under the age of twenty-one compete to become British Under-21 Champion.

- British Speedway Under 19 Championship

The top British riders under the age of nineteen compete to become British Under-19 Champion.

- SGB Premiership Riders' Championship

Top riders from each First Division club compete to become Riders Individual Champion.

- SGB Championship Riders' Championship

Top riders from each Second Division club compete to become Riders Individual Champion.

- National League Riders' Championship

Top riders from each Third club compete to become Riders Individual Champion.

== Clubs ==
=== SGB Premiership ===
- Belle Vue Aces
- Ipswich Witches - current Knockout Cup Champions
- Kings Lynn Stars
- Leicester Lions
- Sheffield Tigers - current First Division League Champions

=== SGB Championship ===
- Berwick Bandits
- Edinburgh Monarchs
- Glasgow Tigers- current Second Division League Champions
- Oxford Cheetahs
- Plymouth Gladiators
- Poole Pirates
- Redcar Bears
- Scunthorpe Scorpions- current Knockout Cup Champions
- Workington Comets

=== National Development League ===
- Buxton Bulls
- King's Lynn Young Stars - The junior side for the Leicester Lions
- Middlesbrough Tigers - The junior side for the Redcar Bears
- Monarchs Academy - The junior side for the Edinburgh Monarchs
- Oxford Chargers - The junior side for the Oxford Cheetahs - current Third Division Champions

== See also ==
- London Riders' Championship
