= 1951 Speedway National League Division Three =

British motorcycle speedway season

- League: National League Division Three
- Season: 1951
- No. of competitors: 10
- Champions: Poole Pirates
- National Trophy (Div 3 final): Exeter Falcons
- Festival of Britain: Poole Pirates
- Riders' Championship: Ken Middleditch
- Highest average: Alan Smith
- Division/s above: Division One; Division Two

The 1951 National League Division Three was the fifth and final season of British speedway's National League Division Three.

The league remained with 10 teams but there were changes. Oxford Cheetahs, Leicester Hunters and Liverpool Chads had all moved up to Division Two whilst Tamworth Tammies dropped out.

Plymouth Devils dropped down from Division Two. The three new sides were Cardiff Dragons, Long Eaton Archers and Wolverhampton Wasps.

Poole Pirates won their first title. Alan Smith of Plymouth topped the averages.

== Final table ==
Pos	Team	PL	W	D	L	Pts
1	Poole Pirates	36	30	0	6	60
2	Exeter Falcons	36	28	0	8	56
3	Aldershot Shots	36	21	1	14	43
4	Rayleigh Rockets	36	21	0	15	42
5	Swindon Robins	36	16	2	18	34
6	Plymouth Devils	36	16	1	19	33
7	Cardiff Dragons	36	13	3	20	29
8	St Austell Gulls	36	13	0	23	26
9	Long Eaton Archers	36	13	0	23	26
10	Wolverhampton Wasps	36	5	1	30	11

== Fixtures & results ==
=== A fixtures ===
Home \ Away	ALD	CAR	EX	LE	PLY	PP	RAY	SA	SWI	WOL
Aldershot		55–28	59–23	66–18	54–30	43–41	54–30	55–28	54–29	60–24
Cardiff	48–36		43–41	59–25	48–36	32–52	40–44	50–31	42–42	52–25
Exeter	56–28	52–32		65–18	54–30	43–41	59–25	63–21	45–38	67–16
Long Eaton	35–48	52–32	39–44		45–39	45–39	29–54	42–41	39–45	60–24
Plymouth	53–31	51–33	41–42	65–19		36–48	44–40	44–40	37–47	61–23
Poole	59.5–24.5	63–21	53–31	68–16	54–30		64–20	59–24	48–36	66–18
Rayleigh	43–40	61–23	61–23	58–26	57–27	38–45		55–29	50–34	67–17
St Austell	43–40	43–41	36–48	52–32	36–48	28–56	58–26		50–34	58–25
Swindon	53.5–30.5	61–22	41–43	59–25	52–32	31–53	35–49	55–29		61–23
Wolverhampton	37–57	54–30	22–62	45–39	34–50	39–45	27–57	48–36	26–58	

Legend: Blue = home team win; Yellow = draw; Red = away team win.

=== B fixtures ===
Home \ Away	ALD	CAR	EX	LE	PLY	PP	RAY	SA	SWI	WOL
Aldershot		51–33	56–28	57–26	53–31	32–52	47–35	58–26	52–31	66–17
Cardiff	45–39		41–42	55–29	43–41	47–37	45–39	66–18	42–42	65–19
Exeter	54–29	60–24		58–25	53–31	55–29	54–29	62–22	53–31	64–19
Long Eaton	43–41	49–35	48–35		42–40	37–47	44–40	54–30	60–24	49–35
Plymouth	42–42	54–30	35–49	59–25		43–40	40–44	53–31	47–37	51–33
Poole	60–24	44–40	54–30	51–33	51–33		55–29	57–27	54–30	63–20
Rayleigh	39–45	48.5–35.5	37–47	55–29	50–33	38–46		51–32	50–34	60–24
St Austell	45–39	44–38	43–41	58–26	38–46	26–53	49–35		44–40	47–37
Swindon	56–28	46–38	38–46	49–35	44–39	38–46	41–43	45–39		59–25
Wolverhampton	28–56	41–41	40–44	50–33	36–48	25–59	35–49	44–40	38–44	

Legend: Blue = home team win; Yellow = draw; Red = away team win.

== Leading Averages ==
	Rider	Team	C.M.A.
1	Alan Smith	Plymouth	10.58
2	Ken Middleditch	Poole	10.33
3	Trevor Redmond	Aldershot	10.10
4	Geoff Mardon	Aldershot	9.88
5	Brian Crutcher	Poole	9.41

== National Trophy Stage Three ==
- For Stage Two - see Stage Two
- For Stage Three - see Stage Three

The 1951 National Trophy (sponsored by the Daily Mail) was the 14th edition of the Knockout Cup. The Trophy consisted of three stages; stage one was for the third division clubs, stage two was for the second division clubs and stage three was for the top-tier clubs. The winner of stage one would qualify for stage two and the winner of stage two would qualify for the third and final stage. Exeter won stage one and therefore qualified for stage two.

Third Division Qualifying First round

Date	Team one	Score	Team two
05/04	Cardiff	52-56	Rayleigh
05/04	Plymouth	54-54	Exeter
02/04	Poole	69-39	Aldershot
02/04	Exeter	77-30	Plymouth
31/03	Aldershot	66-40	Poole
31/03	Rayleigh	68-40	Cardiff
31/03	Swindon	71-37	Long Eaton
29/03	Long Eaton	49-58	Swindon

Third Division Qualifying semifinals

Date	Team one	Score	Team two
16/04	Exeter	73-35	Rayleigh
16/04	Poole	61-47	Swindon
07/04	Swindon	66-41	Poole
14/04	Rayleigh	56-52	Exeter

=== Qualifying final ===
First leg

21 April 1951

Swindon Robins Hugh Geddes 15 Bob Jones 10 Danny Malone 9 Ken Wiggins 6 Buster Brown 4 Ray Ellis 2 Frank Evans 1 Dennis Newton 0	47 – 61	Exeter Falcons Bob Roger 13 Don Hardy 10 Goog Hoskin 9 Johnny Sargeant 8 Ted Moore 8 Vic Gent 6 Jack Bedkober 5 Paul Best 2

Abbey Stadium

Second leg

23 April 1951

Exeter Falcons Vic Gent 16 Goog Hoskin 10 Johnny Sargeant 10 Bob Roger 93 Don Hardy 8 Ted Moore 8 Jack Bedkober 2 Bert Fryer 0	63 – 45	Swindon Robins Hugh Geddes 15 Frank Evans 7 George Craig 6 Danny Malone 5 Ray Ellis 4 Ken Wiggins 4 Bob Jones 3 Buster Brown 1

County Ground Stadium

== Festival of Britain Trophy ==
Group A

Team	PL	W	D	L	Pts
Poole	6	5	0	1	10
Exeter	6	3	0	3	6
Aldershot	6	2	0	4	4
Plymouth	6	2	0	4	4

Group B

Team	PL	W	D	L	Pts
Rayleigh	6	5	0	1	10
Swindon	6	3	1	2	7
Cardiff	6	2	1	3	5
Long Eaton	6	1	0	5	2

Home \ Away	ALD	EX	PLY	PP
Aldershot		89–30	82–38	57–63
Exeter	71–47		81–39	67–53
Plymouth	69–51	69–51		57–63
Poole	72–48	70–50	74–46	

Legend: Blue = home team win; Yellow = draw; Red = away team win.

Home \ Away	CAR	LE	RAY	SWI
Cardiff		83–36	61–59	59–61
Long Eaton	62–58		57–63	52–68
Rayleigh	66–54	82–38		77–43
Swindon	60–60	86–34	51–67	

Legend: Blue = home team win; Yellow = draw; Red = away team win.

Final

Team one	Team two	Score
Poole	Rayleigh	70–50, 57–63

== Riders' Championship ==
Ken Middleditch won the National League Division Three Rider's Championship. The final was held at Penarth Road Stadium in Cardiff on 23 October.

Pos.	Rider	Pts
1	(England) Ken Middleditch	14
2	(England) Alan Smith	11+4
3	(England) Jack Unstead	11+3
4	(England) George Wall	11+2
5	(England) Terry Small	11+1
6	(New Zealand) Trevor Redmond	11+0
7	(England) Bob Roger	9
8	(England) Tony Lewis	9
9	(England) Gerry Jackson	9
10	(New Zealand) Mick Holland	7
11	(England) Buster Brown	6
12	(England) Goog Hoskin	5
13	(England) Jack Winstanley	2
14	(Australia) Hugh Geddes (res)	1
15	(England) Danny Malone	1
16	(England) Norman Street	1
17	(England) Tom O'Connor	0
18	(England) Don Hardy	0

== Riders & final averages ==
Aldershot

- Geoff Mardon 10.06
- Trevor Redmond 10.00
- Basil Harris 8.07
- Bert Edwards 8.04
- Pat Flanagan 6.59
- Ivor Powell 6.11
- Brian Wilson 5.61
- Doug Papworth 4.79
- Ron Burnett 4.67
- Bob Harrison 4.28
- John Dore 4.19
- Bill Grimes 3.43
- Craig Jones 3.49

Cardiff

- Charlie May 8.88
- Mick Holland 8.26
- Gerald Pugh 7.44
- Kevin Hayden 7.39
- Chum Taylor 6.62
- Arthur Pilgrim 6.47
- Jimmy Wright 6.20
- Frank Johnson 5.16
- Bert Croucher 4.78
- Les Moore 4.64
- Ray Beaumont 4.44
- Vic Butcher 4.00
- Mick Callaghan 4.16
- Vic Brinkworth 2.78
- Jack Bibby 2.67
- Ray Thackwell 2.29

Exeter

- Bob Roger 8.91
- Don Hardy 8.89
- Goog Hoskin 8.79
- Johnny Sargeant 8.43
- Ken Walsh 8.30
- Jack Bedkober 7.10
- Vic Gent 6.77
- Ted Moore 6.02
- Paul Best 4.49

Long Eaton

- Frank Malouf 6.82
- Jack Winstanley 6.71
- Peter Moore 5.71
- Johnny Jones 5.50
- Eric Minall 5.41
- Eric Mason 5.37
- Ernest Palmer 5.05
- Bill Humphries 4.55
- Percy Brine 4.44
- Ray Binfield 3.53

Plymouth

- Alan Smith 10.84
- George Wall 9.13
- Bill Thatcher 8.00
- Brian Hitchcock 6.08
- Ron Barrett 5.93
- Johnnie Bradford 5.22
- George Craig 4.63
- Frank Wheeler 4.56
- Rusty Wainwright 4.21
- Tom Turnham 4.18
- Dennis Hayles 4.00
- Doug Fursey 3.33
- Farnk Holcombe 3.29
- George Watts 3.08

Poole

- Ken Middleditch 10.47
- Terry Small 9.60
- Brian Crutcher 9.52
- Bill Holden 8.08
- Tony Lewis 8.08
- Roy Craighead 8.00
- Alan Kidd 7.51
- Vic Thyer 6.60
- Dick Howard 7.41
- Johnny Thomson 6.67
- Charlie Hayden 6.55
- Frank Wheeler 4.83
- Jack Cunningham 4.00

Rayleigh

- Gerry Jackson 8.58
- Jack Unstead 8.43
- Maurice Dunn 8.30
- Tom O'Connor 7.74
- Les McGillivray 7.56
- Ron Howes 7.23
- Vic Gooden 6.83
- Jules Benson 6.13
- Frank Bettis 5.20
- Mike Wood 4.00
- James Osborne 3.29

St Austell

- Harold Bull 7.16
- Ticker James 7.37
- Norman Street 7.29
- Ken James 5.80
- Maurice Hutchens 5.69
- Mick Mitchell 5.49
- Max Rech 5.48
- Allan Quinn 5.54
- Ken Monk 4.84
- Stan Bedford 3.04

Swindon

- Buster Brown 7.87
- Alex Gray 7.69
- Hugh Geddes 7.54
- Danny Malone 7.35
- Frank Evans 7.13
- Ray Ellis 6.80
- Bob Jones 6.90
- Reg Lambourne 6.10
- Miek Beddoe 5.33
- Ken Wiggins 4.47
- Dudley Smith 3.67

Wolverhampton

- Roy Moreton 6.55
- Jack Cunningham 5.96
- Harry Wardropper 5.49
- Ron Wilson 5.39
- Ronnie Genz 5.06
- Dick Harris 4.83
- Gundy Harris 4.58
- Alan Sutcliffe 4.57
- John Hitchings 4.56
- Cliff Biggs 4.43
- Bob Wigg 4.40
- Derek Timms 4.30
- Cyril Maidment 3.50
- Ted Stevens 2.29

== See also ==
- List of United Kingdom Speedway League Champions
- Knockout Cup (speedway)
