= 1952 Speedway Southern League =

British motorcycle speedway season

- League: Southern League
- Season: 1952
- No. of competitors: 10
- Champions: Rayleigh Rockets
- National Trophy (Southern final): Plymouth Devils
- Highest average: George Wall
- Division/s above: National League Div 1 National League Div 2

The 1952 Southern League was the first season of the newly created regional third tier of speedway racing in the United Kingdom for Southern British teams. From the defunct National League Division Three of the previous season, only Poole Pirates did not join the new league. Ipswich Witches and Southampton Saints were new entrants.

Rayleigh Rockets were champions whilst. George Wall of Plymouth topped the averages.

Long Eaton Archers withdrew mid-season after experiencing financial difficulties. They closed down after their 31 July fixture.

== Final table ==
Pos	Team	PL	W	D	L	Pts
1	Rayleigh Rockets	36	28	0	8	56
2	Cardiff Dragons	36	23	0	13	46
3	Plymouth Devils	36	20	1	15	41
4	Wolverhampton Wasps	36	20	1	15	41
5	Exeter Falcons	36	20	1	15	41
6	Swindon Robins	36	18	0	18	36
7	Aldershot Shots	36	15	1	20	31
8	Ipswich Witches	36	12	0	24	24
9	Southampton Saints	36	11	0	25	22
10	St Austell Gulls	36	11	0	25	22

Withdrawal (Record expunged) : Long Eaton Archers

== Fixtures & results ==
=== A fixtures ===
Home \ Away	ALD	CAR	EX	IPS	LE	PLY	RAY	SA	SOT	SWI	WOL
Aldershot		52–32	58–25	59–25	56–28	42–42	36–48	61–22	47–37	46–38	46–37
Cardiff	63–21		58–26	63–21	63–21	47–37	46–38	59–25	61–23	52.5–31.5	66–18
Exeter	52–29	46–38		54–30	63–20	44–40	40–44	53–30	58–26	49–35	43–41
Ipswich	52–32	48–35	42–41		53–31	35–49	38–45	46–38	55–28	39–45	39–45
Long Eaton	36–47	41–43	53–29	44–40		51–33	42–42	50–34	54–30	n/a	45–39
Plymouth	46–37	53–31	57–27	58–25	64–20		45–39	53–31	59–25	59–25	45–39
Rayleigh	64–20	62–22	49–35	53–31	54–30	45–39		54–30	59–22	46–37	52–32
St Austell	42–41	31–53	29–55	30–54	47–36	45–38	45–39		53–31	45–39	44–40
Southampton	43–38	40–44	39–45	34–47	57–27	49–35	27–56	55–29		41–43	37–47
Swindon	63–21	44–40	48–36	47–37	58–26	41–43	50–34	62–22	65–19		45.5–38.5
Wolverhampton	55–28	54–30	59–25	51–33	59–25	51–31	47–37	48–36	61–23	45–39	

Legend: Blue = home team win; Yellow = draw; Red = away team win.

=== B fixtures ===
Home \ Away	ALD	CAR	EX	IPS	LE	PLY	RAY	SA	SOT	SWI	WOL
Aldershot		52–32	62–22	56–28	n/a	45–39	41–43	54–30	53–31	50–33	39–45
Cardiff	68–16		65–19	59–25	64–20	58–22	53–31	62–22	58–26	53–30	66–17
Exeter	63–21	45–39		55–29	n/a	48–35	33–51	52–31	47–36	39–45	51–33
Ipswich	56–27	40–44	38–46		n/a	32–52	35–49	48–36	55–26	40–44	47–37
Long Eaton	n/a	n/a	n/a	n/a		n/a	n/a	n/a	n/a	n/a	n/a
Plymouth	64–20	51–33	40–44	57–26	n/a		26–58	59–25	58–26	44–39	55–29
Rayleigh	61–23	48–36	52–32	59–25	n/a	44–39		60–24	65–19	60–24	67–17
St Austell	54–30	50–34	41–43	38–46	n/a	39–45	43–40		54–30	47–37	41–43
Southampton	60–24	37–47	62–21	48–35	n/a	44–40	46–38	58–26		46–38	59–25
Swindon	41–43	40–44	49–35	57–27	n/a	54–30	35–49	43–41	48.5–35.5		55–29
Wolverhampton	58–26	53–31	42–42	55–29	n/a	59–25	33–50	62–22	61–23	50–34	

Legend: Blue = home team win; Yellow = draw; Red = away team win.

== Leading Averages ==
	Rider	Team	C.M.A.
1	George Wall	Plymouth	10.26
2	Alan Smith	Plymouth	9.93
3	Pete Lansdale	Plymouth	9.46
4	Goog Hoskin	Exeter	9.45
5	Jack Unstead	Rayleigh	9.33

== National Trophy Stage Three ==
- For Stage Two - see Stage Two
- For Stage Three - see Stage Three

The 1952 National Trophy was the 15th edition of the Knockout Cup. The Trophy consisted of three stages; stage one was for the third-tier clubs, stage two was for the second-tier clubs and stage three was for the top-tier clubs. The winner of stage one would qualify for stage two and the winner of stage two would qualify for the third and final stage. Plymouth won stage one and therefore qualified for stage two.

Third Division qualifying first round

Date	Team one	Score	Team two
22/04	Southampton	49-58	Cardiff
18/04	Wolverhampton	74-33	Long Eaton
17/04	Cardiff	75-33	Southampton
17/04	Long Eaton	58-50	Wolverhampton

Third Division qualifying second round

Date	Team one	Score	Team two
26/04	Swindon	52-56	Cardiff
25/04	Wolverhampton	49-59	Exeter
24/04	Cardiff	74-32	Swindon
24/04	Ipswich	50-57	Rayleigh
21/04	Exeter	73-34	Wolverhampton
19/04	Rayleigh	60-48	Ipswich
19/04	Aldershot	48-60	Plymouth
17/04	Plymouth	76-31	Aldershot

Third Division qualifying semifinals

Date	Team one	Score	Team two
08/05	Cardiff	59-48	Rayleigh
03/05	Rayleigh	70-38	Cardiff
01/05	Plymouth	67-41	Exeter
28/04	Exeter	57-51	Plymouth

=== Qualifying final ===
First leg

15 May 1952

Plymouth Devils Pete Lansdale 17 George Wall 16 Bill Tatcher 14 Alan Smith 11 Brian Hitchcock 5 Denis Hayles 3 Doug Fursey 3 Frank Wheeler 0	69 – 38	Rayleigh Rockets Jack Unstead 10 Peter Clark 8 Julie Benson 6 Ron Howes 5 Tom O'Connor 3 Gerald Jackson 3 Les McGillivray 2 Maurice McDermott 1

Pennycross Stadium

Second leg

17 May 1952

Rayleigh Rockets Jack Unstead 16 Les McGillivray 13 Gerald Jackson 10 Julie Benson 10 Ron Howes 8 Tom O'Connor 5 Peter Clark 5 Maurice McDermott 0	67 – 41	Plymouth Devils George Wall 14 Alan Smith 10 Pete Lansdale 8 Bill Tatcher 4 Brian Hitchcock 3 Johnny Bradford 2 Denis Hayles 1 Frank Wheeler 0

Rayleigh Weir Stadium

== Riders & final averages ==
Aldershot

- Ivor Powell 7.90
- Bert Edwards 7.83
- Basil Harris 7.05
- Doug Papworth 6.71
- Vic Gooden 6.60
- Arch Windmill 5.91
- Ron Burnett 5.37
- Bill Grimes 5.18
- Charles Frenzel 4.75
- Jack Taylor 2.24
- John Dore 1.28

Cardiff

- Gerald Pugh 8.55
- Mick Holland 8.34
- Hugh Geddes 8.27
- Chum Taylor 8.15
- Bert Edwards 7.85
- Paul Best 7.00
- Frank Johnson 6.56
- Charlie May 6.43
- Kevin Hayden 6.42
- Jimmy Wright 6.21

Exeter

- Goog Hoskin 9.20
- Don Hardy 7.53
- Vic Gent 7.66
- Ron Barrett 7.38
- Jack Geran 6.79
- Johnny Sargeant 5.39
- Colin Selley 4.67
- Maurice Barnett 4.45
- Neil Street 4.18
- Ron Swaine 4.06
- Eric Minall 3.83

Ipswich

- Sid Clarke 9.08
- Harold McNaughton 7.43
- Dick Shepherd 7.04
- Charlie Mugford 5.42
- Tich Read (George Snailum) 4.92
- Geoff Woodger 4.44
- Dennis Day 4.27
- Rod Laudrum 4.27
- Vic Sage 4.27
- Alby Smith 4.17
- Arthur Pigrim 3.86

Long Eaton (withdrew)

- Lionel Watling 8.30
- Peter Moore 7.01
- Wilf Plant 6.83
- Bill Harris 6.73
- Cyril Page 6.08
- Johnny Jones 5.81
- Jack Winstanley 5.57
- Roy Browning 4.83
- Frank Malouf 4.65
- Fred Siggins 3.29

Plymouth

- George Wall 10.78
- Alan Smith 10.14
- Pete Lansdale 9.77
- Bill Thatcher 8.09
- Johnnie Bradford 5.43
- Brian Hitchcock 4.90
- Ray Moreton 4.63
- Ted Stevens 4.49
- Doug Fursey 4.41
- Dennis Hoyle 3.43
- Frank Wheeler 4.00
- Bill Rundle 2.63

Rayleigh

- Jack Unstead 9.62
- Gerry Jackson 9.54
- Peter Clark 9.26
- Maury McDermott 8.64
- Tom O'Connor 8.40
- Les McGillivray 6.71
- Alby Smith 6.50
- Ron Howes 5.80
- Jules Benson 5.51
- Johnny Applegate 2.43

St Austell

- Norman Street 8.05
- Allan Quinn 7.77
- Ken Monk 6.13
- Max Rech 6.06
- Harold Bull 5.98
- George Newton 5.86
- Johnny Bradford 4.96
- Dick Harris 4.67
- Aston Quinn 4.62
- Ken James 4.46
- Charlie Hayden 4.33
- Derek Timms 4.32
- Don Prettijohn 3.65
- Gordon Leigh 2.50

Southampton

- Brian McKeown 8.10
- Bert Croucher 7.50
- Ernie Brecknell 6.73
- Mike Tamms 6.34
- Dudley Smith 5.90
- Maury Mattingley 4.86
- Jack Vallis 4.30
- Ted Moore 4.27
- Dennis Cross 4.16
- Dennis Hayles 3.78

Swindon

- Frank Evans 8.09
- Danny Malone 7.37
- Bob Jones 7.32
- Bob Wells 7.04
- Buster Brown 6.82
- Reg Lambourne 6.36
- Ian Williams 6.11
- Ray Ellis 5.77
- Ken Wiggins 4.21

Wolverhampton

- Benny King 8.97
- Cyril Quick 8.28
- Jimmy Grant 7.75
- Eric Irons 7.62
- Jack Cunningham 6.24
- Ken Brown 6.24
- Bill Jemison 5.90
- Dick Howard 5.89
- Charlie Hayden 5.19
- Roy Moreton 4.75
- Stan Bradbury 4.44
- Derek Timms 4.00

== See also ==
- List of United Kingdom Speedway League Champions
- Knockout Cup (speedway)
