= 1991 Australian Individual Speedway Championship =

Australian motorcycle speedway championship

The 1991 Australian Individual Speedway Championship was the 1991 version of the Australian Individual Speedway Championship organised by Motorcycling Australia. The final took place on 27 January at the Arunga Park Speedway in Alice Springs in the Northern Territory.

Sydney's Craig Boyce won his first Australian championship, defeating defending champion Glenn Doyle, with veteran Glyn Taylor finishing third (both from Perth). Boyce was unbeaten on the night, securing his first Australian Championship.

It was the only time the Australian Solo Championship final has been held in the Northern Territory.

== Qualification (State titles) ==
=== Northern Territory ===
- Northern Territory Championship
- 17 November 1990
- (Northern Territory) Tennant Creek, Tennant Creek Speedway
- Referee:
- Qualification: The top two riders go through to the Australian Final.

Pos.	Rider	Points	Details
1	Wayne Bridgeford	15	
2	Glen Baxter	14	
3	Trevor O'Brien	13	
4	Robbie Wark	11	
5	Kelvin Willis	11	
6	Wayne Lorymer	9	
7	Mark O'Cass	7	
8	Marcus Gray	7	
9	Danny Wark	7	
10	Kerrin Giezendanner	7	
11	Stuart Cassidy	6	
12	Michael Clauson	4	
13	Dean Pierce	4	
14	Tony Hardacre	2	
15	Wally Bondareff	1	

=== Queensland ===
- Queensland Championship
- 1 December 1990
- (Queensland) Mac's Speedway, Mackay
- Qualification: The top two riders go through to the Australian Final.

Pos.	Rider	Points	Details
1	Troy Butler	15	
2	Darren Winkler	13+3	
3	Alan Rivett	13+2	
4	Wayne Baxter	11+3	
5	Peter Christopher	11+2	
6	John Reid	10	
7	Stafford Galvin	8	
8	Terry Keyse	7	
9	Clinton Butler	5	
10	Wayne Kennedy	5	
11	Gary Richards	4	
12	Craig Hyde	4	
13	Steven Butler	4	
14	Gary Davey	3	
15	Brian Ward	2	
16	Craig Jung	2	
17	Kevin Winton (Res)	2	

=== Victoria ===
- Victorian Championship
- 23 December 1990
- (Victoria (state)) Olympic Park Speedway, Mildura
- Qualification: The top two riders go through to the Australian Final.

Pos.	Rider	Points	Details
1	Leigh Adams*	15	
2	Jason Lyons	14	
3	Phil Crump*	11+3	
4	Mark Lemon	11+2	
5	Nigel Alderton	10	
6	Cory Alderton	10	
7	Jason Hawkes	10	
8	Matt McWilliam	8	
9	Anthony Key	6	
10	Glen Bowles	5	
11	Jody Mason	5	
12	Gavin Sedgemen	4	
13	Paul Wheatland (Res)	3	
14	Justin Thomas	2	
15	Reece Davison (Res)	2	
16	Nigel Termelling	1	
17	Rick Watson	1	
18	Darren Wade	1	

Leigh Adams withdrew from the Australian Final after breaking his wrist in Adelaide on 9 January 1991. As the 3rd placed rider in the Victorian title, four time national champion Phil Crump was seeded to the Australian Final in Adams place.

=== New South Wales ===
- NSW Championship
- 26 December 1990
- (New South Wales) Newcastle Motordrome, Newcastle,
- Qualification: The top two riders go through to the Australian Final.

Pos.	Rider	Points	Details
1	Craig Boyce	15	
2	Todd Wiltshire	14	
3	Stephen Davies	13	
4	Chris Watson	11+3	
5	Rod Colquhoun	11+2	
6	Mick Poole	10	
7	Sean Willmott	8	
8	Scott Humphries	8	
9	Tony Primmer	8	
10	Mark Unicomb	5	
11	Jamie Plumb	4	
12	Matthew Poole	3	
13	Mick Holder	3	
14	Darren Etheridge	3	
15	Dave Hamnett	2	
16	Tim Hunter	2	

=== Western Australia ===
- WA Championship
- 28 December 1990
- (Western Australia) Claremont Speedway, Perth,
- Qualification: The top two riders go through to the Australian Final.

Pos.	Rider	Points	Details
1	Glenn Doyle	30	
2	David Cheshire	28	
3	Michael Carter	22	
4	Glyn Taylor	20	
5	Guy Wilson	20	
6	Ross Townson	15	
7	Louis Russell	11	
8	Steve O'Leary	9	
9	Marshall McDiarmid	9	
10	Lee Redmond	8	
11	Frank Smart	8	
12	Col Burn	5	
13	Steve Johnston (Res)	0	

=== South Australia ===
- SA Championship
- 29 December 1990
- (South Australia) Riverview Speedway, Murray Bridge
- Referee: Gavin Willson
- Qualification: The top two riders go through to the Australian Final.

Pos.	Rider	Points	Details
1	Shane Parker	15	
2	Damon Richardson	11+3	
3	Brett Tomkins	11+2	
4	Neil Perry	10+3	
5	Neil Hardy	10+3	
6	Darrell Branford	9	
7	Steve Graetz	8	
8	Ross Noble	8	
9	Scott Norman	7	
10	Barry Golding	7	
11	Troy Norvill	6	
12	Gary Fischer	6	
13	Paul Cooper	5	
14	Mark Mitchell	3	
15	Matthew Anchor	3	
16	Ivan Clothier (Res)	1	
17	Shaun Sampson	0	

=== Qualifying round ===
After a number of high-profile riders had failed to qualify for the Australian final, a special qualifying round was held at Arunga Park the week before the finals. Unfortunately the round was not well attended after it was revealed that only the top five riders would be paid travel money prompting some of those higher profile riders to boycott the event, most notably NSW rider Stephen Davies who had placed 2nd and 3rd in the previous two Australian titles.

- Qualifying Round
- 19 January 1991
- Arunga Park Speedway, Alice Springs, Northern Territory
- Qualification: The top four riders go through to the Australian Final. Fifth place takes Australian Final reserve spot.

Pos.	Rider	Points	Details
1	Shane Bowes (SA)	12	
2	Scott Norman (SA)	10	
3	Mark Lemon (Vic)	9+3	
4	Glyn Taylor (WA)	9+2	
5	Kelvin Willis (NT)	9+1	
6	Jason Hawkes (Vic)	6	
7	Trevor O'Brien (NT)	6	
8	John Reid (Qld)	5	
9	Robbie Wark (NT)	4	
10	Danny Wark (NT)	3	
11	Mark O'Cass (NT)	2	
12	Troy Mitchell (NT)	2	
13	Stuart Cassidy (NT)	1	

== Final ==
- Australian Championship
- 27 January 1991
- (Northern Territory) Arunga Park Speedway, Alice Springs

Pos.	Rider	Points	Details
Gold	Craig Boyce ( (New South Wales) )	15	(3,3,3,3,3)
Silver	Glenn Doyle ( (Western Australia) )	14	(3,3,3,3,2)
Bronze	Glyn Taylor ( (Western Australia) )	12	(1,3,3,2,3)
4	David Cheshire ( (Western Australia) )	10+3	(2,3,1,1,3+3)
5	Todd Wiltshire ( (New South Wales) )	10+2	(3,x,2,2,3+2)
6	Shane Bowes ( (South Australia) )	10+1	(3,1,2,3,1+1)
7	Phil Crump ( (Victoria (state)) )	9	(0,2,3,3,1)
8	Troy Butler ( (Queensland) )	8	(0,2,2,2,2)
9	Shane Parker ( (South Australia) )	8	(2,2,2,2,e)
10	Scott Norman ( (South Australia) )	5	(2,1,0,0,2)
11	Damon Richardson ( (South Australia) )	5	(2,0,1,0,2)
12	Mark Lemon ( (Victoria (state)) )	5	(1,2,1,1,0)
13	Wayne Bridgeford ( (Northern Territory) )	3	(1,1,0,0,1)
14	Darren Winkler ( (Queensland) )	2	(1,0,0,1,0)
15	Glen Baxter ( (Northern Territory) )	2	(0,0,0,1,1)
16	Jason Lyons ( (Victoria (state)) )	2	(ns,1,1,0,0)
17	Kelvin Willis ( (Northern Territory) ) (Res)	0	(0,-,-,-,-)

m – exclusion for exceeding two-minute time allowance • t – exclusion for touching the tapes • x – other exclusion • e – retired or mechanical failure • f – fell • ns – non-starter • nc – non-classify

== See also ==
- Australia national speedway team
- Sport in Australia
