= Glenn Doyle =

Australian speedway rider

- Born: 4 March 1965 (age 61); Sydney, New South Wales
- Nationality: Australian

Career history
- 1986-1988: Long Eaton Invaders
- 1987: Belle Vue Aces
- 1987: Hackney Kestrels
- 1987-1988: Sheffield Tigers
- 1988: Oxford Cheetahs
- 1988: Swindon Robins
- 1988: Ipswich Witches
- 1988: Reading Racers
- 1989-1991: Bradford Dukes
- 1992: Eastbourne Eagles
- 1993: King's Lynn Stars

Individual honours
- 1989, 1990, 1991, 1992, 1993, 1995: Western Australian Champion
- 1989, 1990: Australian Champion

Glenn Doyle (born 3 March 1965 in Sydney, New South Wales) is a retired Australian Motorcycle speedway rider. Doyle is a twice Australian Champion and won the Western Australian Championship in his adopted state on six occasions. He earned 20 caps for the Australia national speedway team.

== Career ==
Doyle began his speedway career in the mid-1980s in Perth, Western Australia, and quickly rose to prominence as WA's best solo rider, becoming a regular winner at the Claremont Speedway

In 1986, Doyle started racing in England during the Australian winter months, starting his career with Long Eaton. Between 1986 and 1988 he rode for Long Eaton, Belle Vue Aces, Hackney Kestrels, Sheffield Tigers, Oxford Cheetahs, Swindon Robins, Ipswich Witches and Reading Racers. Doyle joined the Bradford Dukes in 1989 and was teammate to such riders as 1992 World Champion Gary Havelock, and multiple Long track World Champion Simon Wigg.

Doyle first won the Western Australian Individual Speedway Championship in 1989 and went on to win that years Australian Championship at the Newcastle Motordrome in Newcastle. Going into the final heat of the night (heat 20), Doyle needed a win to take the title. He was in second place behind Mick Poole going into the last lap, but pulled off a pass on the final turn to win his maiden Australian championship.

Doyle retained the WA championship in 1990 to qualify for the Australian final. Despite being the defending champion, Doyle was again not considered amongst the favourites for the 1990 Australian Championship held at the Brisbane Exhibition Ground. Once again he defied his critics by finishing the heats in equal first place, forcing a run-off with Victorian rider and future 10 time national champion Leigh Adams. Doyle defeated Adams in the run-off to claim his second straight Australian championship.

After winning the WA title for the third year in succession, Doyle would finish runner up to Sydney's Craig Boyce in the 1991 Australian Championship in Alice Springs. Both went into their final heat at the Arunga Park Speedway unbeaten in their first four rides. With Boyce winning the start, Doyle was unable to get past and had to settle for second in both the race and the championship. He won his fourth WA championship in succession in 1992, before finishing fifth in the 1992 Australian Championship at the North Arm Speedway in Adelaide. Doyle represented Australia 20 times throughout his career, both in Australia and overseas. He also captained Western Australia in two challenges against a visiting team from Russia in 1991.

In 1992, Doyle joined Eastbourne Eagles before moving to King's Lynn Stars for the 1993 season despite work permit issues. Doyle created history by winning his fifth straight WA state title in 1993, but his run was stopped when he finished second to Steve Johnston in 1994, though he would regain his crown in 1995. Doyle holds the record for WA title wins with six.

After retiring from riding in the mid-1990s, Doyle came out of retirement on 31 March 2000 along with other former Perth riders such as Glyn Taylor, to ride a series of match races at the final meeting of the Claremont Speedway which was closing after 73 years. Doyle won most of his races on the night showing he had lost none of his style or speed in retirement.
