= 1953 Speedway Southern League =

British motorcycle speedway season

- League: Southern League
- Season: 1953
- No. of competitors: 8
- Champions: Rayleigh Rockets
- Highest average: Goog Hoskin
- Division/s above: National League Div 1 National League Div 2

The 1953 Southern League was the second season of the regional third tier of speedway racing in the United Kingdom for Southern British teams. It was the final season before being replaced by the Southern Area League.

From the previous season, Aldershot Shots dropped out, Wolverhampton Wasps moved up and Oxford Cheetahs came down to replace them.

== Summary ==
Rayleigh Rockets were champions for a second consecutive season whilst Cardiff Dragons withdrew mid-season. Goog Hoskin of Exeter topped the averages.

== Final table ==
Pos	Team	PL	W	D	L	Pts
1	Rayleigh Rockets	26	21	1	4	43
2	Exeter Falcons	26	20	1	5	41
3	Ipswich Witches	28	13	2	13	28
4	Swindon Robins	28	13	2	13	28
5	Southampton Saints	28	12	2	14	26
6	Oxford Cheetahs	28	9	1	18	19
7	St Austell Gulls	28	9	0	19	18
8	Plymouth Devils	28	8	1	19	17

Withdrawal (Record expunged) : Cardiff Dragons

== Fixtures & results ==
=== A fixtures ===
Home \ Away	CAR	EX	IPS	OX	PLY	RAY	SA	SOT	SWI
Cardiff		45–39	58–26	n/a	53–31	n/a	57–27	56–28	n/a
Exeter	55–29		69–15	54–30	59–25	49–35	56–28	50–34	58–26
Ipswich	49–35	41–43		58–26	48–35	42–42	43–41	47–36	55–29
Oxford	n/a	51–33	49–35		50–33	39–44	54–30	56–28	42–42
Plymouth	49–35	41–43	48–36	44–40		38–46	37–47	47–37	42–42
Rayleigh	56–28	39–45	62–22	46–38	52–32		59–25	54–30	59–24
St Austell	46–38	40–44	40–44	50–34	32–52	42–40		40–43	47–37
Southampton	n/a	39–45	47–37	60–24	47–36	34–50	61–22		35–49
Swindon	37–47	41–43	43–40	46–36	49–35	44–40	60–23	51–32	

Legend: Blue = home team win; Yellow = draw; Red = away team win.

=== B fixtures ===
Home \ Away	EX	IPS	OX	PLY	RAY	SA	SOT	SWI
Exeter		53–31	57–27	51–33	60–24	61–23	60–24	49–35
Ipswich	59–25		64–20	49–35	38–46	60–24	42–42	52–32
Oxford	46–38	39–45		39–45	41–43	60–23	44–40	49–35
Plymouth	36–48	51–33	49–35		38–46	46–38	38–45	41–43
Rayleigh	53–31	53–31	43–40	51–33		60–24	56–27	58–26
St Austell	43–40	34–49	47–37	47–37	35–49		47–37	61–23
Southampton	42–42	54–30	45–39	51–31	57–27	63–21		53–31
Swindon	41–43	47–37	51–33	46–38	39–45	62–22	43–41	

Legend: Blue = home team win; Yellow = draw; Red = away team win.

== Leading averages ==
	Rider	Team	C.M.A.
1	Goog Hoskin	Exeter	10.87
2	Gerald Jackson	Rayleigh	9.68
3	Alan Smith	Plymouth	9.37
4	Peter Clark	Rayleigh	9.27
5	Jack Geran	Exeter	9.06

== National Trophy ==
For the National Trophy see the 1953 Speedway National League.

== Riders and final averages ==
Cardiff (withdrew)

- Charlie May 9.80
- Hugh Geddes 9.08
- Bert Edwards 8.94
- Frank Johnson 7.76
- Mick Holland 7.50
- Gerald Pugh 5.33
- Mick Callaghan 4.52
- Jimmy Wright 4.40
- Kevin Hayden 4.26

Exeter

- Goog Hoskin 10.86
- Jack Geran 9.33
- Don Hardy 7.96
- Maurice Barnett 7.33
- John Hart 7.04
- Vic Gent 6.72
- Neil Street 6.46
- Johnny Sargeant 6.40
- Charlie May 5.95
- Bob Meyer 4.00

Ipswich

- Bert Edwards 9.12
- Sid Clarke 8.08
- Jimmy Grant 7.53
- Harold McNaughton 7.28
- Dick Shepherd 7.08
- Tich Read (George Snailum) 6.60
- Nobby Stock 6.57
- Dennis Day 6.32
- Jim Blythe 5.71
- Charlie Mugford 5.58
- Doug Papworth 5.54
- Len Silver 4.67

Oxford

- Jim Boyd 8.70
- Jim Gregory 8.54
- Peter Robinson 7.38
- Bill Kemp 6.47
- Frank Johnson 6.29
- Bob McFarlane 6.10
- Bill Osborne 5.25
- Benny King 4.66
- Herby King 4.64
- Frank Boyle 3.70
- Bill Codling 3.67

Plymouth

- Alan Smith 9.50
- Pete Lansdale 8.56
- Bill Thatcher 8.05
- Len Read 6.73
- George Wall 6.51
- Stan Clark 4.82
- Kevin Hayden 4.38
- Brian Hitchcock 3.33
- Derek Timms 3.02
- Doug Fursey 2.80
- Dick Harris 2.00
- Jack Hillard 1.60

Rayleigh

- Gerry Jackson 9.96
- Peter Clark 9.74
- Maury McDermott 7.92
- Tom O'Connor 7.81
- Les McGillivray 8.16
- Alby Smith 6.30
- Ron Howes 6.06
- Frank Bettis 5.60

St Austell

- Harold Bull 7.18
- Jack Gates 7.18
- Cyril Maidment 6.71
- John Yates 6.19
- Alf Webster 6.18
- Ken Monk 6.14
- Johnny Sargeant 6.05
- Bob Duckworth 4.99
- Graham Williams 4.47
- Norman Street 4.30
- Kevin Bock 3.55
- Maury McHugh 3.26

Southampton

- Brian McKeown 8.74
- Ernie Rawlins 8.55
- Hugh Geddes 7.85
- Ernie Brecknell 7.55
- Maury Mattingley 7.31
- Dudley Smith 5.45
- Mike Tamms 5.20
- Jack Vallis 4.75
- Brian Hanham 4.15
- Lionel Levy 3.27

Swindon

- Ian Williams 8.39
- Danny Malone 8.15
- Bob Wells 6.72
- Ron Swaine 6.44
- Reg Lambourne 6.17
- Bob Jones 6.06
- Mick Hard 5.38
- Frank Evans 5.18
- Gordon Leigh 4.73
- Bill Grimes 4.57
- Ken Wiggins 4.16

== See also ==
- List of United Kingdom Speedway League Champions
- Knockout Cup (speedway)
