= 1999 Australian Individual Speedway Championship =

Speedway racing event

Seasons
- ← 1998 2000 →

The 1999 Australian Individual Speedway Championship was held at the Olympic Park Speedway in Mildura, Victoria on 13 February 1999.

Former World #3 Todd Wiltshire won his first Australian Championship defeating Jason Lyons in a runoff after both finished on 14 points. Adelaide's Nigel Sadler finished third after defeating Perth's Frank Smart and local youngster Travis McGowan in a runoff after all three riders finished on 10 points.

Despite the championship being run on his home track, defending champion Leigh Adams did not ride in the Australian Final for the first time since 1991 where he had been forced to withdraw after breaking his wrist in a crash in Adelaide three weeks before the event.

== Final ==
- 13 February 1999
- (Victoria (state)) Mildura - Olympic Park Speedway
- Qualification: The top four riders go through to the Overseas final in King's Lynn, England.

Pos.	Rider	Total
1	(New South Wales) Todd Wiltshire	14+3
2	(Victoria (state)) Jason Lyons	14+2
3	(South Australia) Nigel Sadler	10+3
4	(Western Australia) Frank Smart	10+2
5	(Victoria (state)) Travis McGowan	10+1
6	(Victoria (state)) Kevin Doolan	9
7	(Victoria (state)) Jason Hawkes	9
8	(Western Australia) Steve Johnston	8
9	(South Australia) Rusty Harrison	8
10	(South Australia) Brett Woodifield	8
11	(Queensland) Davey Watt	6
12	(Victoria (state)) Nathan Simpson	4
13	(Australia) Steve Viner	4
14	(Western Australia) Lee Redmond	2
15	(Australia) Clinton Leitch	1
16	(Australia) Scott Hislop	1
17	(Victoria (state)) Jason Stewart (Res)	1
18	(Victoria (state)) Ashley Jones (Res)	0

== See also ==
- Australia national speedway team
- Sport in Australia
