= 1998 Australian Individual Speedway Championship =

Australian motorcycle speedway championship

Seasons
- ← 1997 1999 →

The 1998 Australian Individual Speedway Championship was held at the Riverview Speedway in Murray Bridge, South Australia on 14 February 1998.

Mildura rider Leigh Adams won his fourth Australian Championship after defeating Jason Lyons and Jason Crump in a runoff when all three riders tied on 13 points.

== Final ==
- Australian Championship
- 14 February 1998
- Murray Bridge, South Australia - Riverview Speedway
- Qualification: The top three riders go through to the Overseas final in Poole, England.

Pos.	Rider	Points	Details
Gold	Leigh Adams ( (Victoria (state)) )	13+3	
Silver	Jason Lyons ( (Victoria (state)) )	13+2	
Bronze	Jason Crump ( (Queensland) )	13+1	
4	Ryan Sullivan ( (South Australia) )	12	
5	Mark Lemon ( (Victoria (state)) )	11	
6	Todd Wiltshire ( (New South Wales) )	11	
7	Steve Johnston ( (Western Australia) )	9	
8	Shane Bowes ( (South Australia) )	8	
9	Shane Parker ( (South Australia) )	7	
10	Mick Poole ( (New South Wales) )	6	
11	Craig Watson ( (New South Wales) )	5	
12	Nigel Sadler ( (South Australia) )	4	
13	Frank Smart ( (Western Australia) )	2	
14	Matt Johnston ( (Queensland) )	2	
15	Cory Alderton ( (Victoria (state)) )	1	
16	Jason Hawkes ( (Victoria (state)) )	1	
17	Brett Woodifield ( (South Australia) ) (Res)	0	

== See also ==
- Australia national speedway team
- Sport in Australia
