= Cardiff Dragons =

Cardiff Dragons may refer to:

- Cardiff Dragons (speedway), a Welsh defunct speedway team
- Cardiff Dragons (netball), formerly Celtic Dragons, a Welsh netball team
- Cardiff City Blue Dragons, Welsh rugby league team
