= 2000 Australian Individual Speedway Championship =

Australian motorcycle speedway championship

Seasons
- ← 1999 2001 →

The 2000 Australian Individual Speedway Championship was held at the Gosford Speedway in Gosford, New South Wales on 5 February.

After missing the 1999 championship at his home track, Leigh Adams was back to win his fifth Australian Championship taking him to outright second on the list of Australian Championship winners, just one behind the record held by the late Billy Sanders. Making it an all Victorian podium, Mark Lemon and Jason Lyons finished in second and third places after Lemon defeated Lyons in a runoff. Local rider and defending national champion Todd Wiltshire defeated Craig Watson to claim the final qualifying spot in the Overseas final.

== Final ==
- Australian Championship
- 5 February 2000
- Gosford, New South Wales - Gosford Speedway
- Qualification: The top four riders go through to the Overseas Final in Poole, England.

| Pos. | Rider | Points | Details |
|---|---|---|---|
| Gold | Leigh Adams ( (Victoria (state)) ) | 13 | |
| Silver | Mark Lemon ( (Victoria (state)) ) | 12+2 | |
| Bronze | Jason Lyons ( (Victoria (state)) ) | 12+1 | |
| 4 | Todd Wiltshire ( (New South Wales) ) | 11+3 | |
| 5 | Craig Watson ( (New South Wales) ) | 11+2 | |
| 6 | Stephen Davies ( (New South Wales) ) | 10 | |
| 7 | Mick Poole ( (New South Wales) ) | 10 | |
| 8 | Steve Johnston ( (Western Australia) ) | 8 | |
| 9 | Travis McGowan ( (Victoria (state)) ) | 8 | |
| 10 | Adam Shields ( (New South Wales) ) | 8 | |
| 11 | Nigel Sadler ( (South Australia) ) | 7 | |
| 12 | Davey Watt ( (Queensland) ) | 4 | |
| 13 | Kevin Doolan ( (Victoria (state)) ) | 3 | |
| 14 | Rusty Harrison ( (South Australia) ) | 2 | |
| 15 | Guy Wilson ( (Western Australia) ) | 1 | |
| 16 | Brendon Mackay ( (New South Wales) ) | 1 | |
| 17 | Chris Szauter ( (New South Wales) ) | 1 | |

== See also ==
- Australia national speedway team
- Sport in Australia
