= 2001 Australian Individual Speedway Championship =

Australian motorcycle speedway championship

Seasons
- ← 2000 2002 →

The 2001 Australian Individual Speedway Championship was held at the Riverview Speedway in Murray Bridge, South Australia on 3 February.

Former World #3 Todd Wiltshire won his second Australian Championship after defeating defending champion Leigh Adams in a runoff. Mick Poole from New South Wales finished third after defeating Perth's Steve Johnston in a runoff, while Shane Parker defeated fellow Adelaide riders Brett Woodifield and Nigel Sadler in a runoff to claim the final spot in the Overseas final.

== Final ==
- 3 February 2001
- (South Australia) Murray Bridge - Riverview Speedway
- Qualification: The top five riders go through to the Overseas Final in Poole, England.

| Pos. | Rider | Points | Details |
|---|---|---|---|
| Gold | Todd Wiltshire ( (New South Wales) ) | 14+3 | |
| Silver | Leigh Adams ( (Victoria (state)) ) | 14+2 | |
| Bronze | Mick Poole ( (New South Wales) ) | 10+3 | |
| 4 | Steve Johnston ( (Western Australia) ) | 10+2 | |
| 5 | Shane Parker ( (South Australia) ) | 9+3 | |
| 6 | Brett Woodifield ( (South Australia) ) | 9+2 | |
| 7 | Nigel Sadler ( (South Australia) ) | 9+1 | |
| 8 | Craig Watson ( (New South Wales) ) | 8 | |
| 9 | Jason Lyons ( (Victoria (state)) ) | 7 | |
| 10 | Travis McGowan ( (Victoria (state)) ) | 6 | |
| 11 | Adam Shields ( (New South Wales) ) | 5 | |
| 12 | Lee Redmond ( (Australia) ) | 4 | |
| 13 | Rusty Harrison ( (South Australia) ) | 4 | |
| 14 | Davey Watt ( (Queensland) ) | 2 | |
| 15 | Dean Wiseman ( (Australia) ) | 2 | |
| 16 | Christian Henry ( (Australia) ) | 1 | |

== See also ==
- Australia national speedway team
- Sport in Australia
