= Western Australian Individual Speedway Championship =

Australian speedway competition

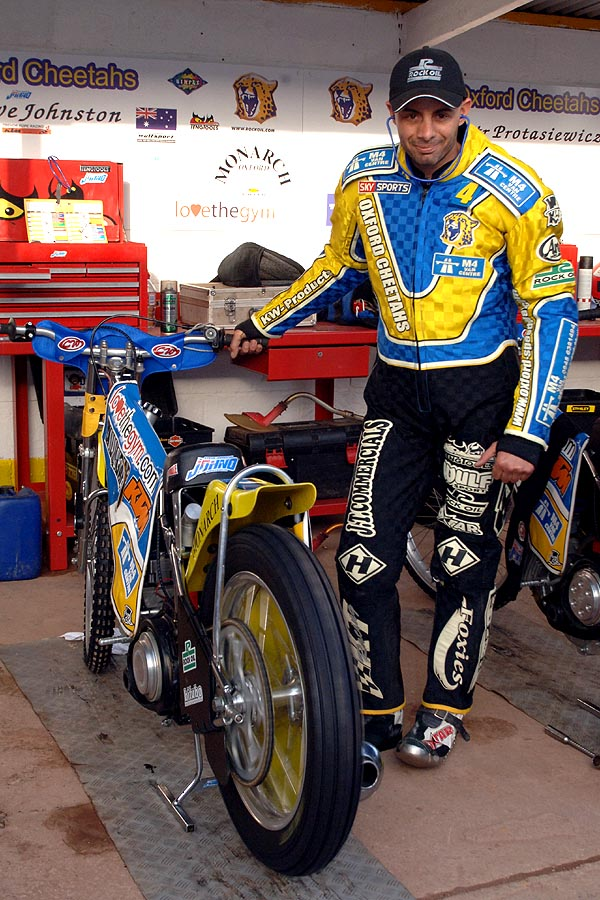
- Steve Johnston, four-time champion
- Sport: Motorcycle speedway
- Most titles: Mick McKeon & Glenn Doyle (6)

The Western Australian Individual Speedway Championship is a Motorcycle speedway championship held annually in Western Australia to determine the WA State champion. The event is organised by the Speedway Motorcycle Club of WA and is sanctioned by Motorcycling Australia (MA).

== History ==
Sig Schlam was the first ever winner of the Championship in 1927/28.

Mick McKeon and Glenn Doyle have both won six championships each, with Chum Taylor and Cameron Heeps winning five times.

Seven international riders have become the Western Australian Champion. They are Arthur Atkinson (England - 1930), Wal Morton (England - 1936), Ken McKinlay (Scotland - 1966), Ove Fundin (Sweden - 1969), Ivan Mauger (New Zealand - 1973), Simon Cross (England - 1987) and Rob Woffinden (England - 1988). Although 1956 winner Ron Johnson was born in Scotland, he emigrated to Perth with his family when still a child and started his speedway career at Claremont. He also rode for Australia during his career.

== Past winners ==
Unless stated, all riders are from Western Australia

Year	Venue	City	Winners
1927/28	Claremont Speedway	Perth	Sig Schlam (2 Miles)
1928/29	Claremont Speedway	Perth	Fred Kirkpatrick
1929/30	Claremont Speedway	Perth	Arthur Atkinson ( (England) )
1930/31 - 1934/35	Not Held		
1935/36	Claremont Speedway	Perth	Wal Morton ( (England) )
1936/37	Claremont Speedway	Perth	Mick Murphy
1937/38 - 1949/50	Not Held		
1950/51	Claremont Speedway	Perth	Wally Higgs
1951/52	Claremont Speedway	Perth	Wally Higgs
1952/53	Claremont Speedway	Perth	Ray Melville
1953/54	Claremont Speedway	Perth	Rusty Wainwright
1954/55	Claremont Speedway	Perth	George McPherson
1955/56	Claremont Speedway	Perth	Ron Johnson
1956/57	Not Held		
1957/58	Claremont Speedway	Perth	Chum Taylor
1958/59	Not Held		
1959/60	Claremont Speedway	Perth	George McPherson
1960/61	Claremont Speedway	Perth	Aub Lawson (NSW)
1961/62	Claremont Speedway	Perth	Chum Taylor
1962/63	Claremont Speedway	Perth	Chum Taylor
1963/64	Claremont Speedway	Perth	Ross Nickisson
1964/65	Claremont Speedway	Perth	Jim Phillips
1965/66	Claremont Speedway	Perth	Ken McKinlay ( (Scotland) )
1966/67	Claremont Speedway	Perth	Ross Nickisson
1967/68	Claremont Speedway	Perth	Chum Taylor
1968/69	Claremont Speedway	Perth	Ove Fundin ( (Sweden) )
1969/70	Claremont Speedway	Perth	Chum Taylor
1970/71	Claremont Speedway	Perth	Terry O'Leary
1971/72	Claremont Speedway	Perth	Les Leisk
1972/73	Claremont Speedway	Perth	Ivan Mauger ( (New Zealand) )
1973/74	Claremont Speedway	Perth	Rod Chessell
1974/75	Claremont Speedway	Perth	Peter Thompson
1975/76	Claremont Speedway	Perth	Les Leisk
1976/77	Claremont Speedway	Perth	Mick McKeon
1977/78	Claremont Speedway	Perth	Mick McKeon
1978/79	Claremont Speedway	Perth	Mick McKeon
1979/80	Claremont Speedway	Perth	Robert Moores
1980/81	Claremont Speedway	Perth	Mick McKeon
1981/82	Bunbury Speedway; Geraldton Speedway	Bunbury; Geraldton	Glyn Taylor
1982/83	Claremont Speedway	Perth	Glyn Taylor
1983/84	Claremont Speedway	Perth	David Cheshire
1984/85	Claremont Speedway	Perth	Mick McKeon
1985/86	Claremont Speedway	Perth	Mick McKeon
1986/87	Claremont Speedway	Perth	Simon Cross ( (England) )
1987/88	Claremont Speedway	Perth	Rob Woffinden ( (England) )
1988/89	Claremont Speedway	Perth	Glenn Doyle
1989/90	Claremont Speedway	Perth	Glenn Doyle
1990/91	Claremont Speedway	Perth	Glenn Doyle
1991/92	Collie Speedway	Collie	Glenn Doyle
1992/93	Claremont Speedway	Perth	Glenn Doyle
1993/94	Claremont Speedway	Perth	Steve Johnston
1994/95	Claremont Speedway	Perth	Glenn Doyle
1995/96	Claremont Speedway	Perth	Steve Johnston
1996/97	Claremont Speedway	Perth	Lee Redmond
1997/98	Claremont Speedway	Perth	Frank Smart
1998/99	Claremont Speedway; Esperance Speedway; Kalgoorlie Speedway; Bibra Lake Speedway	Perth; Esperance; Kalgoorlie; Perth	Guy Wilson
1999/2000	Esperance Speedway; Claremont Speedway; Kalgoorlie Speedway	Esperance; Perth; Kalgoorlie	Lee Redmond
2000/01	Esperance Speedway; Geraldton Speedway; Perth Motorplex	Esperance; Perth; Kwinana Beach	Guy Wilson
2001/02	Perth Motorplex (x2); Bibra Lake Speedway	Kwinana Beach; Perth	Guy Wilson
2002/03	Bibra Lake Speedway	Perth	Lee Blackman
2003/04	Bibra Lake Speedway	Perth	Steve Johnston
2004/05	Perth Motorplex; Geraldton Speedway	Kwinana Beach; Geraldton	Trevor Harding
2005/06	Bunbury Speedway; Geraldton Speedway	Bunbury; Geraldton	David Cheshire
2006/07	Pinjar Park Speedway	Perth	Cory Gathercole (Vic)
2007/08	Pinjar Park Speedway	Perth	Chris Holder (NSW)
2008/09	Pinjar Park Speedway	Perth	Frank Smart
2009/10	Ellenbrook Speedway	Bullsbrook	Leigh Boujos
2010/11	Nickol Bay Speedway	Karratha	Leigh Boujos
2011/12	Pinjar Park Speedway	Perth	Frank Smart
2012/13	Pinjar Park Speedway	Perth	Cameron Heeps
2013/14	Pinjar Park Speedway	Perth	Daniel Winchester
2014/15	Pinjar Park Speedway; Collie Speedway	Perth; Collie	Cameron Heeps
2015/16	Pinjar Park Speedway	Perth	Daniel Winchester
2016/17	Pinjar Park Speedway	Perth	Cameron Heeps
2017/18	Pinjar Park Speedway	Perth	Cameron Heeps
2018/19	Pinjar Park Speedway	Perth	Tai Woffinden ( (England) )
2019/20	Pinjar Park Speedway	Perth	Dakota Ballantyne
2020/21	Pinjar Park Speedway	Perth	Matt Marson
2021/22	Pinjar Park Speedway	Perth	Steve Johnston
2022/23	Pinjar Park Speedway	Perth	Cameron Heeps
2023/24	Pinjar Park Speedway	Perth	Luke Killeen
2024/25	Pinjar Park Speedway	Perth	Mitch McDiarmid
2025/26	Pinjar Park Speedway	Perth	Mitch McDiarmid
