= Sig Schlam =

Australian motorcycle speedway rider

- Born: 5 February 1905; Boulder, Western Australia, Australia
- Died: 30 November 1930 (aged 25); WACA Ground, Perth, Australia
- Nationality: Australian

Individual honours
- 1928, 1929: Australian champion (4 lap/2 miles)
- 1928: Western Australian Individual Speedway Championship

Sigismund Leopold Schlam (5 February 1905 – 2 November 1930) was a motorcycle speedway rider from Australia. He was champion of Australia (3 lap) in 1928 and earned one international caps for the Australia national speedway team.

== Biography ==
Schlam, born in Boulder, Western Australia, was raised in Yarloop but was sent to study in Capetown, South Africa, the country of his parents, before they emigrated to Australia. Schlam left the course and returned to take work on his father's timber mill.

Schlam found a job with a motorcycle business called Mortlock Brothers, where he began to ride motor cycles. He dominated Western Australian speedway during the early days of the sport in the 1920s. He was the first ever winner of the Western Australian Individual Speedway Championship in 1927/28.

The following season, Schlam won the first of his two Australian national titles at the Claremont Speedway (where Johnnie Hoskins was the manager). In 1928, he travelled to the United Kingdom as so many Australian riders did during the period collated prize money in various events on the London tracks.

Schlam died young after being killed in a speedway accident on 1 November 1930. Racing at the WACA ground in Perth, he reached the final of the A Grade Handicap race. Entering Causeway corner he crashed into the safety fence and Schlam was thrown into the middle of the track. He died later in Perth Hospital from severe head trauma.

== See also ==
Rider deaths in motorcycle speedway
