= Gerry Jackson =

British speedway rider

- Born: 14 October 1925; Teddington, England
- Died: 2 July 1997 (aged 71)
- Nationality: British (English)

Career history
- 1950–1956: Rayleigh Rockets
- 1956: Wembley Lions
- 1957-1964: Wimbledon Dons
- 1965-1967: Hackney Hawks

Team honours
- 1958, 1959, 1960, 1961: National League
- 1959, 1960, 1962: National Trophy
- 1952, 1953: Southern League Champion
- 1959: Britannia Shield

Gerald Richard Jackson (14 October 1925 – 2 July 1997) was a motorcycle speedway rider from England.

== Career ==
Jackson started his British leagues career during the 1950 Speedway National League Division Three season, where he rode for Rayleigh Rockets. He was part of the Rayleigh team that won the 1952 Speedway Southern League. The following season, Rayleigh repeated the success and Jackson finished second in the league averages during the 1953 Speedway Southern League, recording a 9.68 average.

Jackson's performances gained the attention of the big London clubs and he rode for the Wembley Lions during the 1956 Speedway National League. He then joined the Wimbledon Dons and rode for them for eight years. He helped Wimbledon seal four league titles and three cups from 1958 to 1962. By the end of the 1950s, he was one of Wimbledon's top riders.

In 1965, Jackson joined Hackney Hawks for the new 1965 British League season and would spend the remainder of his career there. He top scored for Hackney in 1965, which meant that he represented them in the 1965 British League Riders' Championship.

Jackson went on to earn nine international England caps.
