= Chum Taylor =

Australian speedway rider (1927–2025)

- Born: 4 April 1927; Perth, Western Australia, Australia
- Died: 19 April 2025 (aged 98)
- Nickname: Chum Taylor
- Nationality: Australian

Career history
- 1951-1952: Ashfield Giants
- 1951-1953: Cardiff Dragons
- 1953-1954: Bristol Bulldogs
- 1953: Swindon Robins
- 1958-1961: Southampton Saints
- 1963: Oxford Cheetahs
- 1964: Poole Pirates
- 1966: Cradley Heathens

Individual honours
- 1958, 1962, 1963, 1968, 1970: Western Australia Champion
- 1966: Australian Champion

Team honours
- 1954: National League Div 2 Champion
- 1954: Southern Shield Winner
- 1961: National League KO Cup Winner
- 1961: National Trophy Winner
- 1964: Provincial Southern League Winner

Edwin Vernon Thomas "Chum" Taylor (4 April 1927 – 19 April 2025) was an Australian motorcycle speedway rider who won the Australian Individual Speedway Championship in 1966. He earned 28 international caps for the Australia national speedway team and one cap for the Great Britain national speedway team.

== Biography ==
Born in Perth, Western Australia, Taylor received the nickname 'Chum' after his grandmother's comment of "oh, my little chum!" on first seeing him when he was a day old. He competed as an amateur jockey and worked as a cooper at the Swan brewery near his home, which allowed him to buy his first motorcycle. After trying road racing and scrambling, Taylor began his speedway career at the Claremont Speedway in 1948. Early success led to an offer to ride for the Ashfield Giants in the United Kingdom, going on to ride for Cardiff Dragons for two seasons. He raced in Britain for several teams from 1951 to 1966 including Ashfield Giants (1951), Cardiff Dragons (1951–52), Bristol Bulldogs (1953), Southampton Saints (1958-1961), Oxford Cheetahs (1963), Poole Pirates (1964) and Cradley Heath Heathens in 1966.

Taylor represented Australia in the World Final in 1960, finishing in 11th place. He won the Western Australia Championship on a record five occasions (1958, 1962, 1963, 1968, and 1970), all at Claremont, and won the Australian Solo Championship in January 1966 at the Rowley Park Speedway in Adelaide.

Taylor represented Australia (and Australasia) several times at international level, first in 1958 in the second Test against England and again in 1959, 1960, 1967/68, 1969/70, 1970/71 (a series in which he captained the team), 1971/72, 1972/3, and for a final time in 1973, a series in which his son Glyn also rode. Glyn Taylor would go on to emulate his father by winning the WA State title in 1982 and 1983.

Taylor retired from racing in 1973 at the age of 46 after a crash in a second half race at Crewe in which he broke his shoulder blade. The Chum Taylor Cup is contested annually in his honour at the Pinjar Park Speedway north of Perth.

Taylor's autobiography, A Dangerous Life, was published in 1986.

In November 2013, Taylor was inducted into the Motorcycling Western Australia Hall of Fame.

Taylor died on 19 April 2025, at the age of 98.

== World Final Appearances ==
=== Individual World Championship ===
- 1960 - (England) London, Wembley Stadium - 11th - 5pts
