= Penarth Road Stadium =

Former motorcycle speedway stadium in Cardiff, Wales

- Location: Penarth Road, Cardiff, Wales
- Coordinates: 51°27′36″N 3°11′44″W

Construction
- Opened: 1950
- Closed: 1953
- Demolished: 1969

The Penarth Road Stadium, was a former motorcycle speedway stadium, on Penarth Road in the Grangetown area Cardiff. The stadium was located adjacent to the River Ely, where it meanders between Penarth Road and the Barry railway line. Today it is the site of an industrial park on a road called Stadium Close.

== History ==
The nearby White City Stadium had been sold to a steel works in 1937, leaving Cardiff without speedway. During 1950, Mr. A.J. Lennox and Mr. Leslie Maidment started to build a speedway track at the site of a rubbish dump in the Grangetown Area of Cardiff and speedway training events were held there during the year.

In November 1950, the Speedway Control Board visited the track in order to issue a licence for league racing the following year. The venue was able to hold up to 30,000 spectators with its terracing.

In January 1951, attempts were made by the Cardiff rugby league team to negotiate a lease for part of the stadium. The Cardiff Dragons speedway team began racing in 1951, competing in the 1951 Speedway National League Division Three. The first home fixture was on 5 April 1951 and the stadium underwent an official opening by the Lord Mayor Alderman George Ferrier.

On 31 May, the stadium held its most significant event to date, a qualifying round of the 1951 Individual Speedway World Championship.

The team raced in the Southern League in 1952 and attracted healthy crowds of 9,000 but the rugby league attendances were poor. In 1953, speedway attendances dropped to 3,000 and mid-way through the 1953 season the team folded and their results were expunged.

The stadium remained derelict until 1969, when the site was replaced with industrial units.
