= Mick Holland =

New Zealand speedway rider

- Born: 29 November 1918; New Brighton, New Zealand
- Died: 29 November 2005 (aged 87); Christchurch, New Zealand

Career history
- 1951–1952: Cardiff Dragons
- 1953–1955: Swindon Robins

Alfred George Holland (29 November 1918 – 29 November 2005) was a motorcycle speedway rider from New Zealand. He earned three caps for the New Zealand national speedway team. He went on to introduce stock car racing into New Zealand in 1954.

== Early life and family ==
Born in the Christchurch suburb of New Brighton on 29 November 1918, Holland was the son of Cuthbert George and Kathleen Cora Holland. He was educated at Beckenham School and Christchurch Technical High School, and did an apprenticeship as a mechanic after leaving school. In 1941, he married his childhood sweetheart, Alison Stewart, and the couple went on to have one child.

== Career ==
Holland rode for Canterbury in New Zealand and for Cardiff Dragons in the National League in the 1950s. After riding in an unofficial Test against Young England in 1952, he represented New Zealand in several international matches, including a 'C' international series against England in 1951, and in a Test series against Australia in 1952, also riding in two matches of the Test series against England in 1952/53. He finished as runner-up to Ron Johnston in the 1952 New Zealand Individual Speedway Championship. In 1952 he moved to Swindon Robins, but injuries limited his season. He remained with Swindon until early in the 1955 season, when he retired from British league racing after three matches. He continued to race in New Zealand and rode for his country in the first Test against England in 1956.

In New Zealand, Holland also competed in road racing, miniature TT, hill climbs and motocross. In 1958 and 1958, he won the senior class at the New Zealand Grand Prix at Cust.

In 1954, Holland introduced (with Merv Neil) stock car racing into New Zealand and later ran a motorcycle business. In the 1990s, he became the Suzuki car dealer in Christchurch.

Holland died in Christchurch in 2005, on his 87th birthday.
