= Jack Unstead =

British motorcycle speedway rider (1926 – 1962)

- Born: 16 February 1926; Bethnal Green, London, England
- Died: 13 April 1962 (aged 36); Ipswich, England
- Nationality: British (English)

Career history
- 1949–1952, 1955–1957: Rayleigh Rockets
- 1953–1955: Bristol Bulldogs
- 1958–1959: Poole Pirates
- 1960–1962: Ipswich Witches

Team honours
- 1954: League champion (tier 2)
- 1952: League champion (tier 3)
- 1954: Southern Shield Winner

John Edward Unstead (16 February 1926 – 13 April 1962) was an international motorcycle speedway rider from England. He earned two international caps for the England national speedway team.

== Biography ==
Unstead, born in Bethnal Green, London, began his British leagues career riding for Rayleigh Rockets during the 1949 Speedway National League Division Three season. During his novice season, he was one of the more positive factors in a disappointing season for Rayleigh. He spent four seasons at Rayleigh, improving his average considerably, culminating in a league winning season for the club during the 1952 Speedway Southern League, where he averaged an impressive 9.62 in the league.

In 1953, Unstead signed for Bristol Bulldogs in the top division of British speedway at the time, the National League. Bristol struggled in 1953 before competing in the second division in 1954 and winning the league title. However, he was left without a club following the withdrawal of Bristol from the league midway through the 1955 season, before returning to ride for Rayleigh.

For the remainder of the 1955 season and the entire 1956 season, Unstead was Rayleigh's leading rider and posted significant averages. Poole Pirates signed Unstead for the 1958 season and he was subject to a failed attempt by Coventry Bees to sign him later that season. However, in 1960, he was signed by Ipswich Witches and was a regular for them throughout the following two seasons.

Tragedy struck in 1962, during the early part of the season. Unstead lined up for Ipswich again but on the 13 April, during a challenge match against Southampton at the Foxhall Stadium, he crashed and was killed when he hit the safety fence.

== See also ==
Rider deaths in motorcycle speedway
