= Glyn Taylor =

Australian speedway rider

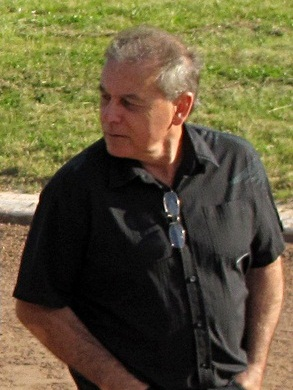
- Born: 24 August 1953 (age 73); Cardiff, Wales
- Nationality: Australian

Current club information
- Career status: Retired

Career history
- 1973: Crewe Kings
- 1973: Hackney Hawks
- 1977, 1983: Reading Racers
- 1983: Edinburgh Monarchs
- 1987: Long Eaton Invaders
- 1993, 1994: Sheffield Tigers
- 1994, 1995: Stoke Potters
- 1994, 1996: Berwick Bandits
- 1996: Bradford Dukes
- 1997: Newcastle Diamonds

Individual honours
- 1982, 1983: Western Australia Champion

Glyn Clifford Taylor (born 24 August 1953) is an Australian former motorcycle speedway rider, who went on to a career building and curating speedway tracks, tuning engines, and in speedway promotion and team management.

== Biography ==
Glyn Taylor was born in Cardiff, Wales in 1953. His father Chum Taylor was an Australian speedway rider who was riding for Cardiff Dragons at the time. He first competed in motocross in 1969 before moving on to grasstrack racing, making his speedway debut in 1971 at the Claremont Speedway in Perth. He began his British speedway career in 1973 with a single match for Peterborough Panthers in British League Division Two, going on to ride in 31 matches for Crewe Kings that season. He also rode in the top division for Hackney Hawks. He made his Australian Test debut in 1973 in the first test against Great Britain in Perth in November 1973, returning to the team in the 1975/76 series and the 1978 series against England. After several years away from British speedway, he returned in 1977 with Reading Racers, and then another long break followed until he rode for Reading again and Edinburgh Monarchs in 1983. In the years between, he continued to race in Australia and rode for the 'Young Australia' team against England in 1981. In 1987 he rode for Long Eaton Invaders. Between 1993 and 1997 had his longest spell in British speedway with Sheffield Tigers (1993–4), Hull Vikings and King's Lynn Stars (1995), Bradford Dukes (1996), and finally Newcastle Diamonds (1997), some years only riding in a few matches but riding in 19 league matches for Bradford in 1996 and 20 for Newcastle in 1997. He retired from the sport in 1997 after a breaking a bone in his back in a crash, although he did make a competitive return in 2003 riding in a Conference League match for Wolverhampton Wolf Cubs.

Taylor rode in the Australian Individual Speedway Championship several times, finishing as runner-up to Billy Sanders in 1983 and finishing third in 1982, 1987, and 1991. He won the Western Australian Individual Speedway Championship in 1982 and 1983.

After retiring from racing, Taylor started his GT Tuning business, and since the early 1990s has designed and built several speedway tracks, including many indoor tracks and the tracks at Redcar, Hull (Craven Park), and the Oaktree Arena at Somerset. He also had a spell as team owner and promoter for Redcar Bears. He was the track curator for Leicester Lions in 2011, returning to the role part way through the 2012 season and also taking over as team manager, the role he continued to undertake until the end of the 2013 season.
