= Les McGillivray =

British motorcycle speedway rider

- Born: 1 October 1929; Islington, London, England
- Died: January 1977 (aged 47); London, England
- Nationality: British (English)

Career history
- 1949–1957, 1963: Rayleigh Rockets
- 1955: Wimbledon Dons
- 1956: Leicester Hunters
- 1958–1959: Poole Pirates
- 1960–1962: Ipswich Witches
- 1962: Coventry Bees
- 1964–1970: Hackney Hawks

Team honours
- 1955: National League Champion
- 1952, 1953: league champion (tier 3)

Leslie McGillivray (1 October 1929 – July 1977) was an international motorcycle speedway rider from England. He earned two international caps for the England national speedway team.

== Biography ==
McGillivray, born in Islington, began his British leagues career riding for Rayleigh Rockets during the 1949 Speedway National League Division Three season, where he made an immediate impact topping the team averages. He was a regular for the team for nine years from 1949 until 1957. During his time at Rayleigh, he helped the team win two consecutive league titles, after they secured the Southern League in both 1952 and 1953.

McGillivray's first taste of top league racing was riding a handful of meetings for Wimbledon Dons in 1955, while he was still a Rayleigh rider. He contributed towards the league title success with a 5.33 average. When Rayleigh dropped out of the league, he joined Poole Pirates for two seasons becoming their club captain. He signed for Ipswich Witches in 1960 and was still with them until the team dropped out of the league in 1962. He spent the remainder of the season with Coventry Bees.

In 1963, McGillivray returned to his old club Rayleigh, topping the club's averages again before joining Hackney Hawks in 1964. On the formation of the British League in 1965, he stayed with Hackney. After seven seasons in total with Hackney, where he was club captain for a period, he retired from speedway after the 1970 season.
