= Boy Throb =

American boy band

- Origin: Los Angeles, California, US
- Genres: Pop; dance-pop
- Years active: 2025–present
- Members: Evan Papier; Zachary Sobania; Anthony Key; Darshan Magdum
- Website: boythrob.com

TikTok information
- Page: boy.throb
- Years active: 2025–present
- Followers: 1.4 million
- Last updated: November 9, 2026

Boy Throb is an American boy band, composed of Anthony Key, Darshan Magdum, Evan Papier, and Zachary Sobania. They first gained popularity on TikTok in 2025. The group has been subject to debate regarding its authenticity as a genuine musical act. The group's primary goals are for Magdum, an Indian national, to acquire an O-1 visa (which was achieved in August 2026) and to win a Grammy award.

== History ==
=== Formation and pre-debut activities ===
Prior to the formation of Boy Throb, all of its members had established individual online followings:

- Evan Papier, who is from the Washington metropolitan area, gained millions of views on TikTok for posting dance videos and vocal covers.
- Zach Sobania grew up in Minnesota, studied at Berklee College of Music, and worked as a law office intern before attending Law school. He plays guitar and violin.
- Anthony Key is from Valparaiso, Indiana. He has released a solo album, K-E-Y KEY!, and runs a YouTube channel called Genshin Cosplay ASMR, with his sister Nicki. He auditioned for American Idol in 2021.
- Darshan Magdum creates cover versions of hit songs and resides in India, virtually joining the group. He has promoted for brands such as KFC and has also gained recognition from musicians including Adam Levine, Bruno Mars, and Rosé.

=== 2025–present: Boy Throb ===
Papier, Sobania, and Key flew from their respective hometowns to rent a house in Los Angeles with the goal to be a successful boy band. On October 28, 2025, they posted their first video on TikTok under the username "@boyband2026" campaigning for Magdum to receive an O-1 visa so he could join them in the United States.

By November 2025, the band had rapidly gained a following, amassing one million followers on TikTok and 500,000 on Instagram. They post covers of popular songs, often with parodied lyrics to promote Magdum's O-1 visa campaign or the band. For their first official gig, Boy Throb performed at a nursing home. Boy Throb maintains that the group is not satire.

The group released its debut single "Finger" on December 12, 2025. On January 30, 2026, they released the accompanying music video, produced by Charlotte Rutherford. In February 2026, Boy Throb signed with Gino Borri as their manager. The group later attended the 68th Annual Grammy Awards and performed the U.S. national anthem at a Los Angeles Kings game.

On February 19, 2026, they made an appearance on the Zach Sang Show and debuted their new single "Can't Stop The Throb". They subsequently released it on February 21.

The band released the song "Number One Boy" on April 2.

On May 12, 2026, Boy Throb held a one-off concert called Throbchella at the Bowery Ballroom in New York City, and debuted an unreleased track called "DJ Turn It Down" featuring Kesha. On May 13, they later made their television debut on WNYW's Good Night New York singing an acoustic version of their song "Finger".

On August 3, 2026, it was announced that Magdum had his O-1 visa approved. They performed together for the first time on October 16 at the American Dream mall, singing “4gether”.

== Artistry and public image ==
The group established their signature outfits as pink velour tracksuits paired with yellow sneakers. The group's name was later chosen through an Instagram comment. Their fans call themselves "Throbbers" or "the Throb Mob".

=== Debates on authenticity and association with Nathan Fielder ===
The group has been subject to debate regarding its authenticity as a genuine musical act. Online speculation has focused on the idea that it may have been created by the Canadian filmmaker Nathan Fielder, possibly for a season three of The Rehearsal, a show created by Fielder. However a third season has not been publicly announced or formally greenlit by HBO, and the group's members have denied the theory.

Speculation online noted similarity in name between the group's 2026 three-city tour called "The Rehearsal Tour" and Fielder's show The Rehearsal. Several users on Reddit have also made posts theorizing that a masked figure seen near the group, such as in one of their videos and on the balcony at one of their concerts, may be Fielder.

The group's goals of getting Darshan Magdum an O-1 visa and winning a Grammy have also been noted as being the types of ambitious goals Fielder has been known to go after. Additionally it has been speculated online, after Fielder himself had acquired U.S. citizenship in late 2025, that a possible season three of The Rehearsal could focus on immigration, with the group's goal of getting Magdum a U.S. visa, fitting that topic.

== Discography ==
=== Singles ===
Song	Release date	Ref
"Finger"	December 12, 2025	
"Can't Stop the Throb"	February 21, 2026	
"Number One Boy"	April 3, 2026	
"DJ Turn It Down" (with Kesha)	June 5, 2026	
"Saving America (The Visa Interlude)"	August 27, 2026	
"4gether"	October 9, 2026	
"Christmas in America"	November 20, 2026	
