= Claremont Speedway =

Former racing track in Claremont, Western Australia

The National Capital of Speed
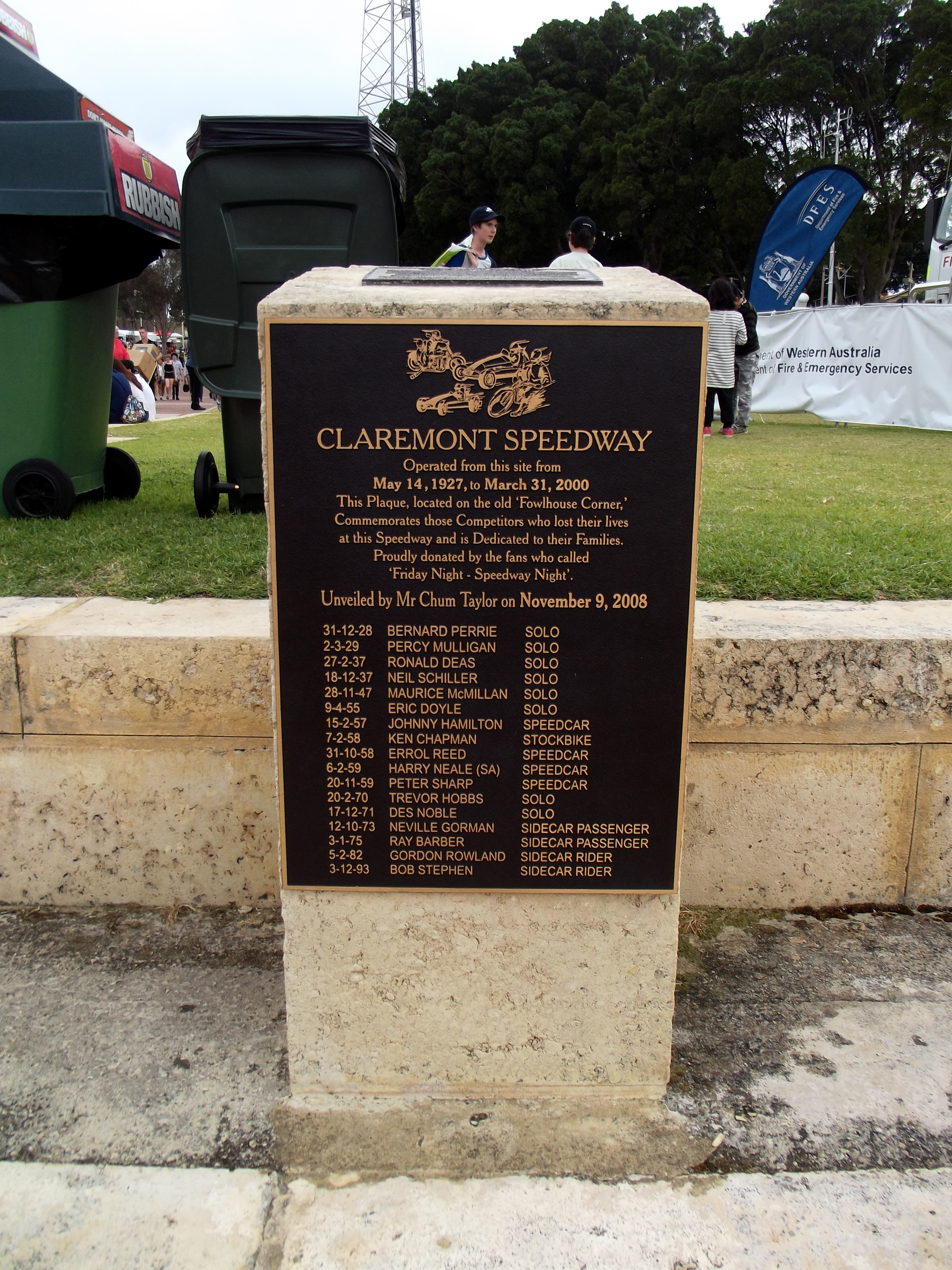
- Claremont Speedway memorial
- Location: Claremont Showground, Claremont, Western Australia
- Coordinates: 31°58′32″S 115°47′07″E
- Capacity: 20,000
- Owner: Royal Agricultural Society of Western Australia
- Operator: Royal Agricultural Society of Western Australia
- Broke ground: 1904
- Opened: 1905 (showground); 1927 (speedway)
- Closed: 2000 (speedway); Still operating as Claremont Showground
- Major events: Australian Sprintcar Championship; Australian Speedcar Championship; Australian Super Sedan Championship; Australian Solo Championship; Australian Sidecar Championship; World Sprintcar Championship; World Series Sprintcars; Various WA State Championships

Oval
- Surface: dolomite / clay
- Length: 0.364 mi (0.586 km)

The Claremont Speedway was a racing circuit in the grounds of the Claremont Showground in the suburb of Claremont in Western Australia's capital city of Perth. The speedway held its first meeting on 14 May 1927, and its final meeting on 31 March 2000.

== History ==
Barriers and fences were improved over time to prevent out of control vehicles from entering the spectator areas. During its 72-year operation the speedway hosted numerous Western Australian championships as well as national championships including the Australian Sprintcar Championship, the Australian Speedcar Championship, the Australian Super Sedan Championship, the Australian Solo Championship, and the Australian Sidecar Championship. The speedway also hosted various rounds of the World Series Sprintcars. Claremont hosted the first ever round of the inaugural World Series Sprintcars on 1 December 1987.

The Speedway was 586 metres (641 yards) in length. This made it the largest continually used speedway in an Australian state capital with the next biggest being the 509-metre (557-yard) Sydney Showground Speedway which closed for regular meetings in 1980 (the Royal Melbourne Showgrounds track was 610 metres (670 yards) long but it was only used infrequently, hosting at best one meeting per season). In its early days, the Claremont track was in fact larger than what it ended up as – approximately 650 metres (710 yards). However, the track was taken over to include seating in the spectator areas and was relaid to its 586-metre length.

Soon after the development of the circuit records were set.

In 1987, Claremont Speedway held the first, and to date only, Sprintcar World Championship. The three-day meeting featured the top drivers from Australia, New Zealand, as well as drivers from America's famed World of Outlaws series, and the youngest driver in the event, 15-year-old Jeff Gordon. The event was won by legendary Australian driver Garry Rush from local Perth driver Alf Barbagallo, with American driver Danny Lasoski finishing third.

After 72 years of operation, the Speedway closed after the 1999/2000 season and the sport moved to a new, 500-metre (550-yard) venue at the Quit Motorplex, near Kwinana which opened in 2000. While the new Motorplex generally caters to car racing, it does contain a 400-metre (440-yard) motorcycle speedway track inside the main track, and even though it hosted rounds of the WA Solo Championship in 2001, 2002 and 2005, solos and sidecars generally raced out of the Bibra Lake Speedway located in the southern Perth suburbs until its closure in 2004, before moving to the new, bike-only 142-metre (155-yard) Pinjar Park Speedway at Wanneroo in northern Perth which opened in 2005, bike racing made comeback at Perth Motorplex during the 2018/19 season. The departure of the speedway at Claremont allowed the main showground arena to be redeveloped into a more open area, suitable for large music events such as the Big Day Out and other festivals as well as for sports such as Australian rules football and cricket.

Through its history, Claremont was home to a number of Australia's best speedway riders and drivers, including Sig Schlam, Chum Taylor, Glyn Taylor, David Cheshire and Glenn Doyle (Solo's), Keith Mann, Johnny Fenton, Neville Lance, Tom Watson Sr and Michael Figliomeni (Speedcars), Dennis Nash, Ed Blakeney Sr, Rod Lang and Russell Mitchell (Sidecars), Noel Bradford, Alf Barbagallo and Bunbury's Ron Krikke (Sprintcars), and Allan Blake, Ben Ludlow, John Singleton, Bert Vosbergen and Craig Vosbergen (Sedans), Johnny Andersson, Bill Broadwood, Vince Chapman, George Higgs, Ken Nielson, Bryan Mullings (Formula 500, TQ's)

== Sponsorship ==
In the 1970s and 1980s, the speedway took the name of various sponsoring business, most notably from cigarette brand Winfield

== Fatalities ==
Claremont Speedway unfortunately saw its share of competitor fatalities and spectator death. In total there were 19 deaths at the speedway between 1928 and 1995.

The 19 who lost their lives at Claremont are

- Bernard Perrie - Solo (31 December 1928)
- Percy Mulligan - Solo (2 March 1929)
- Ronald Deas - Solo (27 February 1937)
- Neil Schiller - Solo (18 December 1937)
- Maurice McMillan - Solo (28 November 1947)
- Eric Doyle - Solo (9 April 1955)
- John Hamilton - Speedcar (15 February 1957)
- Ken Chapman - Stockbike (7 February 1958)
- Errol Reed - Speedcar (31 October 1958)
- Harry Neale - Speedcar (6 February 1959)
- Peter Sharp - Speedcar (20 November 1959)
- Trevor Hobbs - Solo (20 February 1970)
- Des Noble - Solo (17 December 1971)
- Gary Jewell - Spectator (20 October 1972)
- Neville Gorman - Sidecar [passenger] (12 October 1973)
- Ray Barber - Sidecar (13 January 1975)
- Gordon Rowland - Sidecar (5 February 1982)
- Bob Stephen - Sidecar (14 December 1993)
- Troy English - Spectator (11 March 1995)

== Plaques ==
In August 2003 a plaque was placed at the Claremont Showground recognising the speedway which for 73 years operated on the site.

CLAREMONT SPEEDWAY
14 May 1927 - 31 March 2000
The world-famous Claremont Speedway operated on this site and is recognised as the longest running dirt track in the history of the sport in Australia.
The first meetings featured solo and sidecar motorcycles and car racing and the first racing under electric lights was held on 19 September 1927.
Over the years, the Claremont Speedway was promoted by John S Hoskins, Peter Panizza, Jim Davies, Ossie Michelsen, George Milne, Mick Tilby, Aub Lawson and the longest serving manager Con Migro.
The track was the venue for Australian Championships in all major speedway divisions, including speedcars and sprint cars and for many international fixtures, including official solo motorcycle Tests between Australia, England and many other countries.
This plaque was erected by the Veteran Speedway Riders Association of Australia to commemorate the home of Western Australian speedway and to honour the 17 competitors who were fatally injured at this site.
Unveiled by Dr Don Robertson, the president of the Royal Agricultural Society of Western Australia Inc., on 31 August 2003.

The text for the plaque was written by author, publisher, patron of the VSRA and long time Sydney Showground Speedway track announcer Jim Shepherd. The date of the first night meeting is incorrect - it was Saturday 10 September 1927.

A SECOND PLAQUE is erected in the same location on the old Fowlhouse Corner. The 'Heroes Plaque' was proudly donated by 'Friends of Claremont Speedway' and unveiled by Mr Chum Taylor on 9 November 2008. This commemorative plaque lists the names of all seventeen competitors who lost their lives in competition at Claremont Speedway and is dedicated to their families.
