= Frank Smart =

Australian speedway rider

- Born: 27 October 1969 (age 57); Perth, Australia
- Nationality: Australian

Career history
- 1990–1993, 1997–1998: Exeter Falcons
- 1999, 2002–2003: Newport Wasps
- 1998, 2000: Swindon Robins

Individual honours
- 1998, 2009, 2012: Western Australian Champion

Team honours
- 2000: Premier League

Frank Dean Smart (born 27 October 1969) is an Australian former motorcycle speedway rider.

== Career ==
Smart started racing in the British leagues during the 1990 National League season, when riding for the Exeter Falcons. He struggled to establish himself in the team and it was not until the 1992 season that he was a regular in the Exeter team. Following a poor 1993 season, he did not return to Britain and Exeter until the 1997 season, where he had improved significantly and recorded a season average of 7.28.

In 1998, Smart won the first of his three Western Australian Individual Speedway Championships and he topped Exeter's team averages in addition to reaching the Premier League pairs final. The following season he joined Newport Wasps, took second place in the fours championship and finished just outside the medals in the 1999 Australian Individual Speedway Championship. At the Welsh club, he became the captain of the Wasps but suffered a significant injury in March 1999, breaking ribs and cracking a vertebra.

In 2000, Smart was riding well for the Swindon Robins, with the team challenging for league honours but he failed a drugs test (amphetamines) and was banned by the Speedway Control Board for the 2001 season.

Smart returned for the 2002 Premier League speedway season with Newport and finished runner up in the pairs championship again before riding one final season in Britain with Newport in 2003. In 2003, he finished runner-up in the Pairs Championship for the third time and reached the fours final.

Smart returned to Australia and continued to ride there, winning the Western Australian Championship twice more in 2009 and 2012.
