= David Cheshire =

Australian speedway rider

- Born: 30 June 1966 (age 60); Perth, Australia
- Nationality: Australian

Career history
- 1983: Cradley Heathens
- 1984–1985: Wolverhampton Wolves
- 1984–1985: Arena Essex Hammers
- 1986: Birmingham Brummies
- 1986: Sheffield Tigers
- 1990–1992: Middlesbrough Bears

Individual honours
- 1984, 2006: Western Australian State Champion

David Edward Cheshire (born 30 June 1966) is a former motorcycle speedway rider from Australia.

== Career ==
Cheshire made his British leagues debut during the 1983 British League season, where he rode for Cradley Heathens. Although he only made five appearances, he was part of the team that won the league and cup double.

The following season, in 1984, Cheshire signed for Wolverhampton Wolves and doubled up for the Arena Essex Hammers in the National League.

Cheshire stayed with Arena Essex in 1985 and then signed for the Birmingham Brummies for the 1986 National League season. It was also in 1986 that he reached the final of the Speedway Under-21 World Championship. In the final, held at Rivne, Cheshire finished in 11th place.

After three years away from British speedway, Cheshire returned with Middlesbrough Bears in 1990 and would stay with them for 1991 (a season curtailed by injury) and 1992, before retiring.

Cheshire represented the Australia national speedway team on three occasions.
