= Goog Hoskin =

British motorcycle speedway rider (1927 – 2005)

- Born: 4 December 1927; Exeter, England
- Died: 20 January 2005 (aged 77); Exeter, England
- Nationality: British (English)

Career history
- 1949–1955, 1963: Exeter Falcons

Team honours
- 1951: National Trophy (Div 3) Winner

Hubert Henry Hoskin (4 December 1927 – 20 January 2005) was a motorcycle speedway rider from England. During his speedway career he was known as Goog Hoskin.

== Biography ==
Hoskin, born in Exeter, began his British leagues career riding for Exeter Falcons during the 1949 Speedway National League Division Three season.

Hoskin spent seven seasons with the Devon club from 1949 to 1955, improving his average season by season and averaged 10.86 and was the division's leading rider during the 1953 Speedway Southern League.

Hoskin earned a status as a fan's favourite but was left without a club when Exeter stopped league racing after the 1955 season. Hoskin chose not to join another club and contemplated emigrating to Canada. When Exeter returned to British speedway in 1961, Hoskin was a target for the new promotion at the club, but he chose not to ride. However, he did resume riding for his home club in 1963 for one final season.
