= George Wall (speedway rider) =

British motorcycle speedway rider

- Born: 4 April 1922; Barking, London, Essex
- Died: 1992
- Nationality: British (English)

Career history
- 1949–1954: Plymouth Devils
- 1954: Rayleigh Rockets

George Henry Wall (4 April 1922 – 1992) was a motorcycle speedway rider from England.

== Biography ==
Wall, born in Barking, London, began his British leagues career riding for Plymouth Devils during the 1949 Speedway National League season. He made an immediate impact with the team, averaging 6.14 in his maiden season.

Wall remained with Plymouth for four seasons from 1949 to 1954 and achieved the feat of being the division's leading rider during the 1952 Speedway Southern League season, after recording an average of 10.78. He amassed high score in almost every match. Mid-way through the 1954 season, he joined Rayleigh Rockets after Plymouth withdrew from the league.

Wall retired after the 1954 season and although he only rode for six years he is remembered as one of Plymouth's leading riders.
