= Southern League (1952–53) =

British motorcycle speedway league

- Sport: motorcycle speedway
- Founded: 1952 replaced the National League Division Three
- Folded: 1953 replaced by the Southern Area League
- Country: England

The Southern League was resurrected in 1952 as the regional third tier of speedway racing in the United Kingdom for Southern British teams as a replacement for the defunct National League Division Three. The league ran for two seasons before being replaced by the Southern Area League. The champions of both seasons were Rayleigh Rockets

== Champions ==
Season	Champions	Second
1952	Rayleigh Rockets	Cardiff Dragons
1953	Rayleigh Rockets	Exeter Falcons

== See also ==
List of United Kingdom Speedway League Champions
