= Bert Edwards (speedway rider) =

British motorcycle speedway rider

- Born: 8 February 1917; Liverpool, England
- Died: 13 June 2008 (aged 91)
- Nationality: British (English)

Career history
- 1950–1951: Walthamstow Wolves
- 1951–1952: Aldershot Shots
- 1952–1953: Cardiff Dragons
- 1953–1958: Ipswich Witches

Richard Herbert Edwards (8 February 1917 – 13 June 2008) was an international motorcycle speedway rider from England. He earned seven international caps for the England national speedway team.

== Biography ==
Edwards was born in Liverpool but attended Hyde School in Hendon and later Goldbeaters Modern School in Burnt Oak. He was a member of the Northern Cycling Club before he and his younger brother Harry Edwards joined the Kenton and Kingsbury Motor Cycle Club. The pair gained recognition as grass track riders before moving into conventional speedway. He began his British leagues career riding for Walthamstow Wolves during the 1950 Speedway National League Division Two, where he joined his brother who was already a Walthamstow rider.

In 1951, after starting the season with Walthamstow, Edwards was loaned out to Aldershot Shots and remained at the club for the first half of the 1952 before transferring from parent club Walthamstow to Cardiff Dragons for £400.

Edwards' riding average was solid but not particularly special and it was not until he joined Ipswich Witches that his career took off. He left Cardiff following their withdrawal from the league in 1953 and although he only rode eight matches for Ipswich during the remainder of the season, he averaged 9.12.

Edwards became very popular at Ipswich where attendances consistently approached 20,000 and was described as an idol by the press. In 1955, he averaged 9.45 and was club captain. In 1956, he was called up by England for test matches that included fixtures against Sweden and Australia. His final two seasons were with Ipswich in the highest division of British speedway in the National League.

== Family ==
Edwards' father Richard was a councillor in Harrow and his uncle was Bob Edwards, a Member of Parliament (MP) from 1955 to 1987.
