= Ipswich Witches =

British motorcycle speedway team

Club information
- Track address: Foxhall Stadium; Ipswich
- Country: England
- Founded: 1950
- Promoter: Richard Coleman & Andrew Chisholm
- Team manager: Paul Hurry
- League: SGB Premiership
- Website: ipswichwitches.co

Club facts
- Colours: Blue, White and Black
- Track size: 285 metres (312 yd)
- Track record time: 55.0 seconds
- Track record date: 10 August 2023
- Track record holder: Emil Sayfutdinov

Current team
Rider	CMA
(England) Tom Brennan
(Sweden) Emil Sayfutdinov
(Poland) Tobiasz Musielak
(England) Danny King
(England) Richard Lawson
(England) Jason Doyle
(England) Jason Edwards

Major team honours
League Champions	1975, 1976, 1984, 1998, 2025
tier 1 Knockout Cup winners	1976, 1978, 1981, 1984, 1998, 2023
tier 1 Pairs Champions	1976, 1977, 2022
tier 2 Knockout Cup winners	1970, 1971
tier 2 Pairs Champions	2015
tier 2 Four-Team Champions	2011
Craven Shield Winners	1998
Spring Gold Cup	1976
Inter-League KO Cup	1977

The Ipswich Witches are a British motorcycle speedway club based at Foxhall Stadium near Ipswich, Suffolk. They compete in the British SGB Premiership. Meetings are staged on most Thursdays from March until October, normally commencing at 7.30pm (first race 7.45pm). The team are five-time champions of Britain.

The Witches were promoted by former Ipswich riders Chris Louis and Ritchie Hawkins until 2026. Chris Louis is the son of former rider and promoter John Louis

== History ==
=== 1950s ===
Foxhall Stadium was purpose-built for speedway in 1950 and following the cancellation of a meeting on 24 March 1951, the venue first hosted speedway on 14 May 1951, when Ipswich competed against Yarmouth in a challenge match. The inaugural league season was the 1952 Speedway Southern League, where the team finished 8th. For their inaugural season, the team adopted the nickname the 'Witches' because of the town's history with the 17th century Suffolk Witch Hunts.

The early stars of Ipswich speedway were Junior Bainbridge and Bert Edwards. Attendances approached 20,000 but the team remained in the second division until the merger of the National league in 1957. Despite signing riders such as Peter Moore, the team struggled and dropped down to the 1959 Southern Area League.

=== 1960s ===
The Witches moved back up to the highest division for 1960 and 1961 and led by Peter Moore, finished fourth and sixth respectively. However, after ten seasons of league speedway the team withdrew from the 1962 Speedway National League mid-season due to financial issues. The 1962 season was the worst in the history of the club, they lost their new signing Olle Nygren to ill-health before the season even started and then Jack Unstead was killed in the first recorded fatal crash at Foxhall Stadium on 13 April 1962.

After very little action, except for some junior matches the club returned under the promotion of Joe Thorley and John Berry in 1969. Berry built a new smaller track inside the stock car circuit.

=== 1970s ===
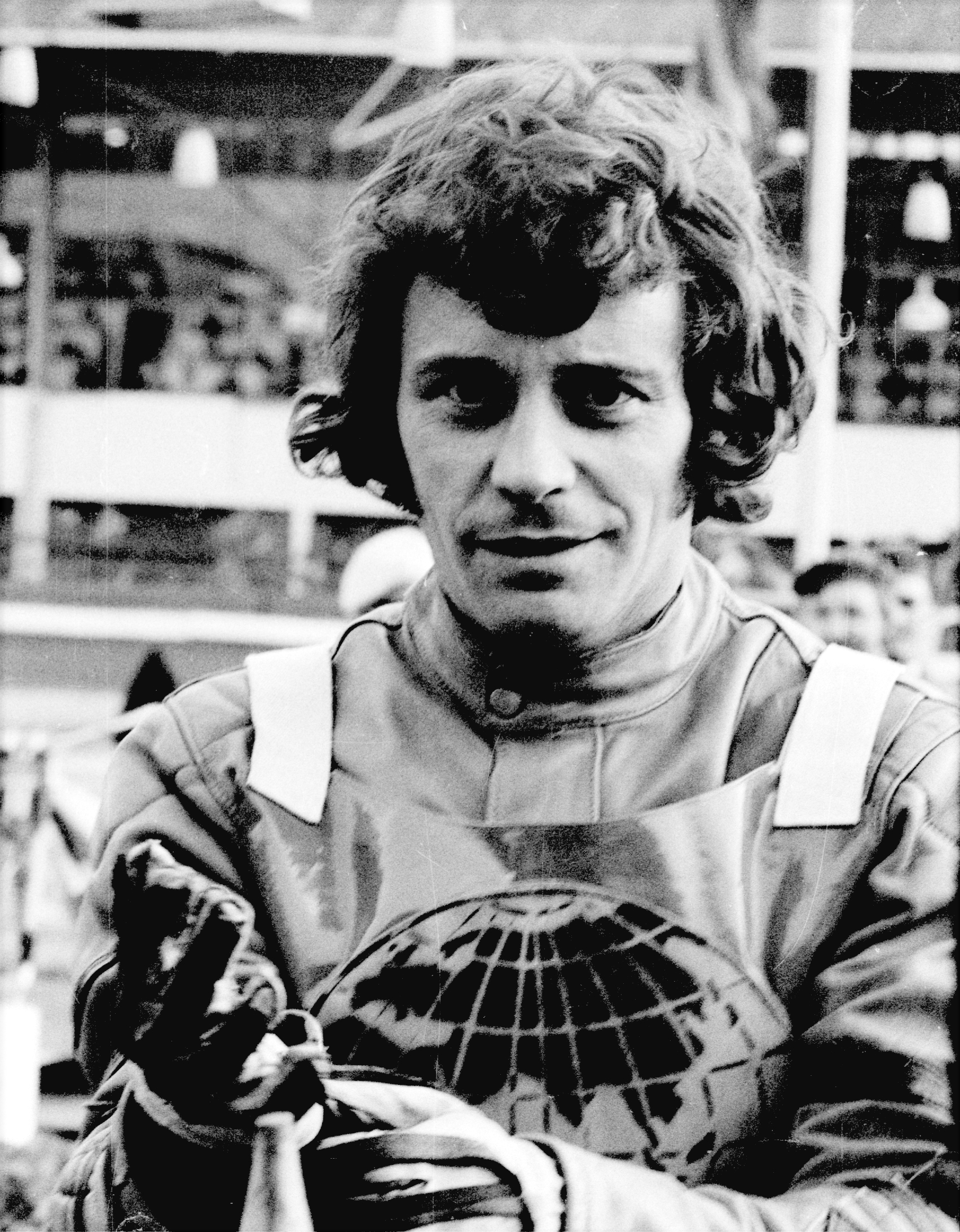
John Louis

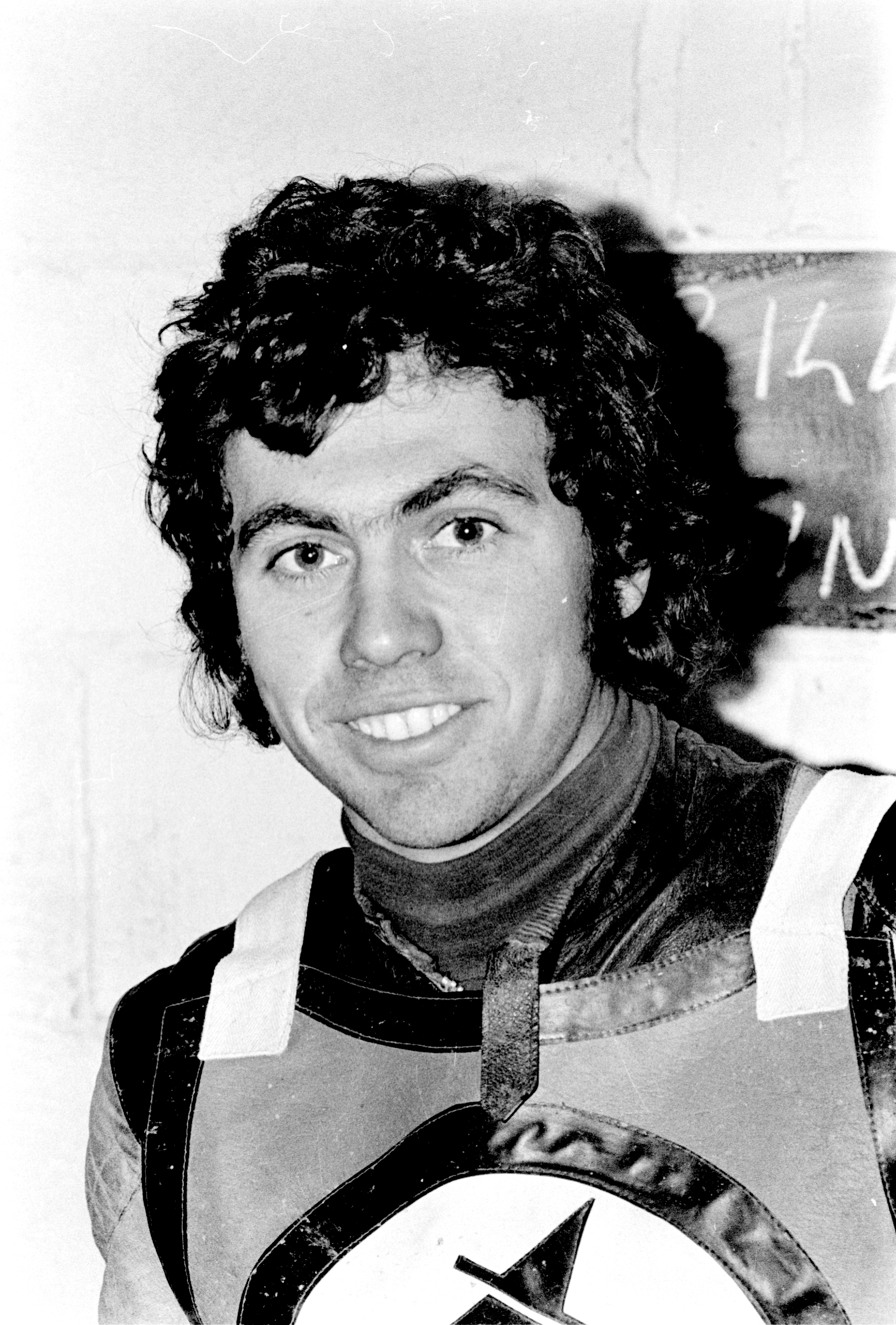
Billy Sanders

After signing John Harrhy and John Louis, the team won their first honours in 1970, winning the Knockout Cup. They repeated the success in 1971, before John Berry applied for membership of the British League in 1972. The Witches established their place in the league over the next three seasons and then won consecutive British League Championships in 1975 and 1976 and two Knock-Out Cup wins in 1976 and 1978. The 1975 title success saw Ipswich defeat Belle Vue Aces by a solitary point. John Louis and Billy Sanders scored heavily throughout the season for Ipswich. The following year in 1976, during Ipswich's second consecutive title, the team was once again headed by John Louis and Billy Sanders but this time Tony Davey also scored well with an average of 8.37, resulting in a comfortable league title success for the Suffolk team. The team then went on to claim the double on 28 October by winning the Knockout Cup.

=== 1980s ===
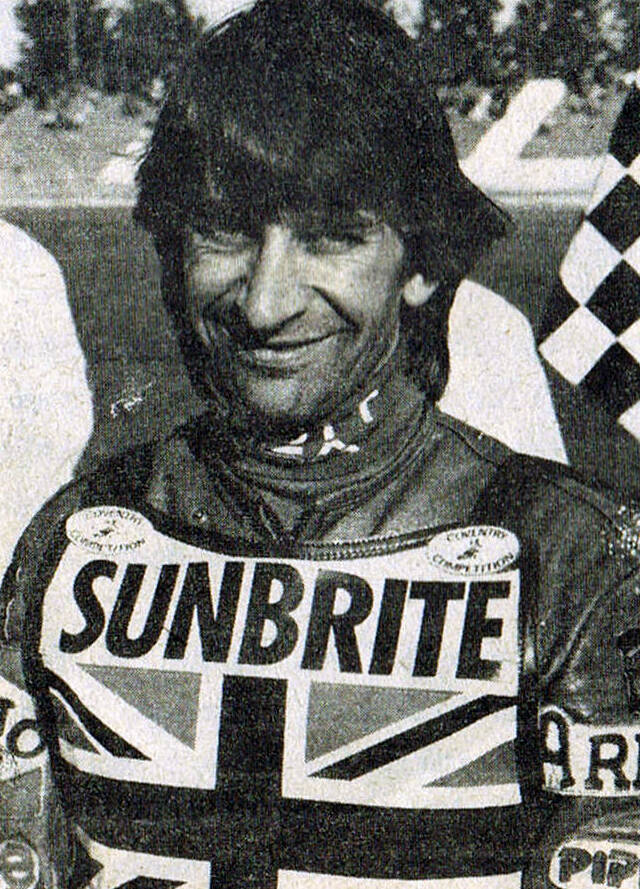
Jeremy Doncaster

The team enjoyed a successful period during the early 1980s, winning the Knockout Cup again in 1981 and then securing the league and cup double again during the 1984 British League season, despite losing their leading rider Dennis Sigalos and Dane Preben Eriksen after the 1983 season. Australian Sanders remained one of the team's main scorers and he was supported by strong season scoring from American showman John Cook, Finn Kai Niemi and the English international pair of Jeremy Doncaster and Richard Knight.

Just three matches into the 1985 season Sanders killed himself on 23 April. The news shocked the club and the wider speedway world. Following the death of Sanders and Berry's subsequent decision to quit, the club struggled and almost closed before being saved by a consortium which included former rider John Louis but they dropped to the National League in 1989.

=== 1990s ===
During the National League seasons of 1989 and 1990, Chris Louis (the son of John Louis) emerged as the club's new star. When the Witches returned to the top tier for the 1991 British League season, Louis and Tony Rickardsson headed the team before Rickardsson left after the 1993 season and then returned in 1997 for the renamed Elite League.

For the 1998 Elite League speedway season, Ipswich signed Tomasz Gollob and along with Rickardsson, Louis and Scott Nicholls the team dominated British speedway, winning the Elite League, the Knock-Out Cup and the end of season Craven Shield tournament. In addition, Rickardsson won his second World title, Louis was British champion and Nicholls was British Under-21 champion.

=== 2000s ===
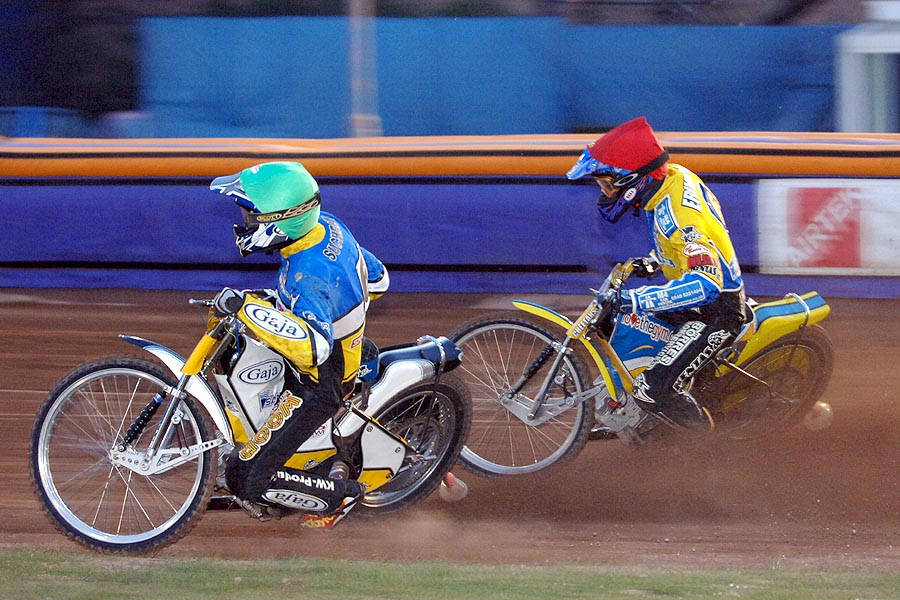
Ipswich versus Oxford in 2007

The team spent the entire decade in the Elite League, finishing third in 2000 and 2004 (the latter resulting in elimination in the play off semi finals). In 2008, they finished fourth and once again were eliminated in the play off semi finals.

The early part of the decade saw Scott Nicholls as their leading rider alongside Louis, with other notable seasons from Mark Loram, Jarosław Hampel and Hans Andersen. Chris Louis remained an ever present for 19 seasons from 1989 to 2008, with the exception of missing the 2003 season with a back injury.

=== 2010s ===
In November 2010, the Witches moved down to the Premier League (second tier). In 2011, the Witches finished in third place in the final Premier League table and won the Premier League Four-Team Championship staged at Leicester. During 2012 Premier League speedway season, Director of Speedway Chris Louis steered the through to team to the Knockout Cup final, finishing runner-up.

For 2013, a new number one rider, Ben Barker joined the Witches, with the team managing a second-place finish behind Somerset Rebels. The following season in 2014, Richie Worrall joined as the new number one, with the Witches finishing third in the Premier League and reaching the Knockout Cup final.

The Witches finished seventh in the Premier League in 2015 but won the pairs with Danny King and Rohan Tungate. In 2017, the team reached the play off final losing to Peterborough Panthers. Shortly before 2019, Ipswich decided to move back to the top division of British speedway, reaching the play off final of the SGB Premiership 2019 season.

=== 2020s ===
The 2020 season was cancelled in July 2020 as a result of the restrictions placed on sporting events by the COVID-19 pandemic rules, set by the UK Government and in 2021, the Witches finished fifth in the SGB Premiership

The Witches signed Jason Doyle in 2022 and he spearheaded the team when they won the 2022 Pairs championship and finished second in the SGB Premiership 2022, losing in the play-off semi final. The resurgence continued in 2023, when Ipswich won the Knockout Cup (top division) for the sixth time. Led by Doyle, Danny King and Russian signing Emil Sayfutdinov they also reached the play offs.

After several unlucky seasons, the Witches won the 2025 Premiership, becoming champions of Britain for the fifth time, after winning the play off final against Leicester Lions, with Doyle and Sayfutdinov starring. At the end of the title winning season, Chris Louis and Ritchie Hawkins left the club with Louis looking to sell to a new promoter.

In 2026, the club was bought by Silverstone based company Mayfield and Paul Hurry was installed as the new team manager.

== Season summary ==
Extended content

Year and league	Position	Notes
1952 Speedway Southern League	8th	
1953 Speedway Southern League	3rd	
1954 Speedway National League Division Two	5th	
1955 Speedway National League Division Two	6th	
1956 Speedway National League Division Two	4th	
1957 Speedway National League	10th	
1958 Speedway National League	10th	
1959 Southern Area League	5th	
1960 Speedway National League	4th	
1961 Speedway National League	6th	
1962 Speedway National League	N/A	resigned, results expunged
1969 British League Division Two season	11th	
1970 British League Division Two season	6th	Knockout Cup div 2 winners
1971 British League Division Two season	3rd	Knockout Cup div 2 winners
1972 British League season	6th	
1973 British League season	5th	
1974 British League season	3rd	
1975 British League season	1st	Champions
1976 British League season	1st	Champions & Knockout Cup winners, pairs winners
1977 British League season	4th	pairs winners
1978 British League season	6th	Knockout Cup winners
1979 British League season	15th	
1980 British League season	6th	
1981 British League season	2nd	Knockout Cup winners
1982 British League season	3rd	
1983 British League season	2nd	
1984 British League season	1st	Champions & Knockout Cup winners
1985 British League season	5th	
1986 British League season	9th	
1987 British League season	6th	
1988 British League season	10th	
1989 National League season	4th	
1990 National League season	3rd	
1991 British League season	6th	
1992 British League season	7th	
1993 British League season	8th	
1994 British League season	6th	
1995 Premier League speedway season	6th	
1996 Premier League speedway season	8th	
1997 Elite League speedway season	4th	
1998 Elite League speedway season	1st	Champions & Knockout Cup winners
1999 Elite League speedway season	5th	
2000 Elite League speedway season	3rd	
2001 Elite League speedway season	4th	
2002 Elite League speedway season	7th	
2003 Elite League speedway season	8th	
2004 Elite League speedway season	3rd	PO semi final
2005 Elite League speedway season	6th	
2006 Elite League speedway season	8th	
2007 Elite League speedway season	9th	
2008 Elite League speedway season	4th	PO semi final
2009 Elite League speedway season	6th	
2010 Elite League speedway season	9th	
2011 Premier League speedway season	3rd	Fours winners
2012 Premier League speedway season	7th	
2013 Premier League speedway season	2nd	
2014 Premier League speedway season	3rd	
2015 Premier League speedway season	7th	pairs winners
2016 Premier League speedway season	5th	PO semi finals
SGB Championship 2017	2nd	PO final
SGB Championship 2018	7th	
SGB Premiership 2019	4th	PO final
SGB Premiership 2021	5th	
SGB Premiership 2022	2nd	PO semi finals, pairs winners
SGB Premiership 2023	4th	PO final, Knockout Cup winners
SGB Premiership 2024	4th	PO semi final
SGB Premiership 2025	2nd	Champions

== Notable riders ==
- (Denmark) Hans Andersen
- (Australia) Junior Bainbridge
- (United States) John Cook
- (Australia) Ray Cresp
- (England) Tony Davey
- (England) Jeremy Doncaster
- (Australia) Jason Doyle
- (England) Bert Edwards
- (Denmark) Preben Eriksen
- (Poland) Tomasz Gollob
- (Poland) Jarek Hampel
- (England) Danny King
- (England) Mark Loram
- (England) Chris Louis
- (England) John Louis
- (Australia) Peter Moore
- (England) Scott Nicholls
- (Sweden) Olle Nygren
- (Sweden) Tony Rickardsson
- (Australia) Billy Sanders
- (Russia) Emil Sayfutdinov
- (Australia) Bob Sharp
- (Australia) Rory Schlein
- (United States) Dennis Sigalos
- (England) Rex Garrod
