= Steve Johnston =

Australian speedway rider (born 1971)

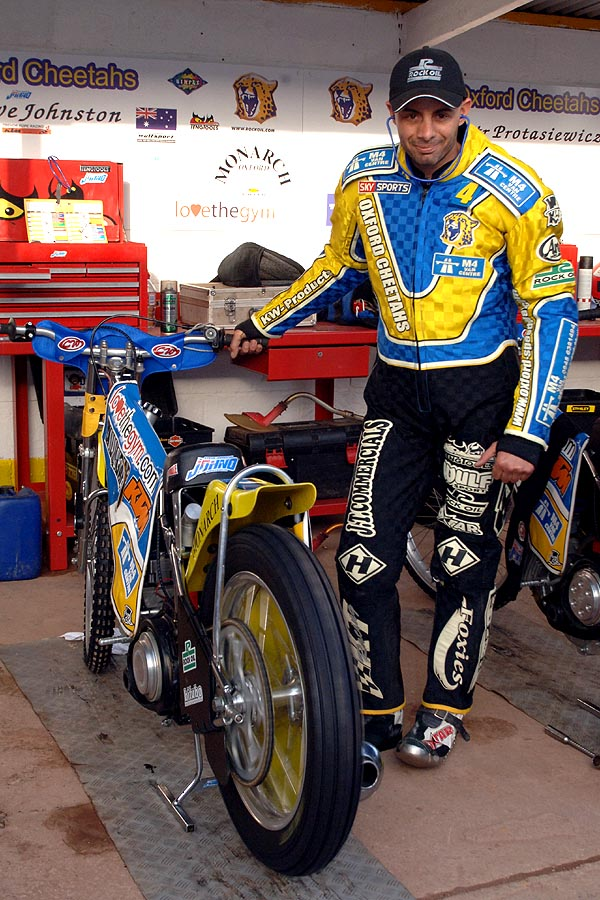
- Johnston in 2007
- Born: 12 October 1971 (age 55); Kalgoorlie, Australia
- Nickname: Johno
- Nationality: Australian

Career history

Great Britain
- 1992–1993: Sheffield Tigers
- 1993–1996: Long Eaton Invaders
- 1997, 2008: Ipswich Witches
- 1998–2002, 2007: Oxford Cheetahs
- 2003: Belle Vue Aces
- 2004: Swindon Robins
- 2005: Wolverhampton Wolves
- 2006: Arena Essex Hammers
- 2007: Coventry Bees
- 2009: Somerset Rebels
- 2010: Birmingham Brummies

Poland
- 1997: Gniezno
- 1998, 2007: Toruń
- 1999: Łódź
- 2000: Ostrów
- 2001: Leszno

Sweden
- 2000–2002: Västervik
- 2003–2005: Vargarna
- 2007–2008: Masarna

Individual honours
- 1994, 1996, 2004, 2022: WA State Champion

Team honours
- 2001, 2007: Elite League Champion
- 2007: Elite League KO Cup Winner
- 2007: Craven Shield Winner
- 2010: Premier League Fours Champion

Steven Paul Johnston (born 12 October 1971) is former international motorcycle speedway rider from Australia.

== Career ==
Born in Kalgoorlie, Western Australia, Johnston signed for the Sheffield Tigers for the 1992 British League Division Two season. He left Sheffield to join the Long Eaton Invaders for the 1993 season. While at Long Eaton, Johnston began to put in notable performances including winning the Western Australian Individual Speedway Championship in 1993 and 1996 at the Claremont Speedway and being the European Grasstrack Champion in 1996.

In 1997, Johnston rode for Ipswich Witches in the 1997 Elite League speedway season and averaged nearly 8.

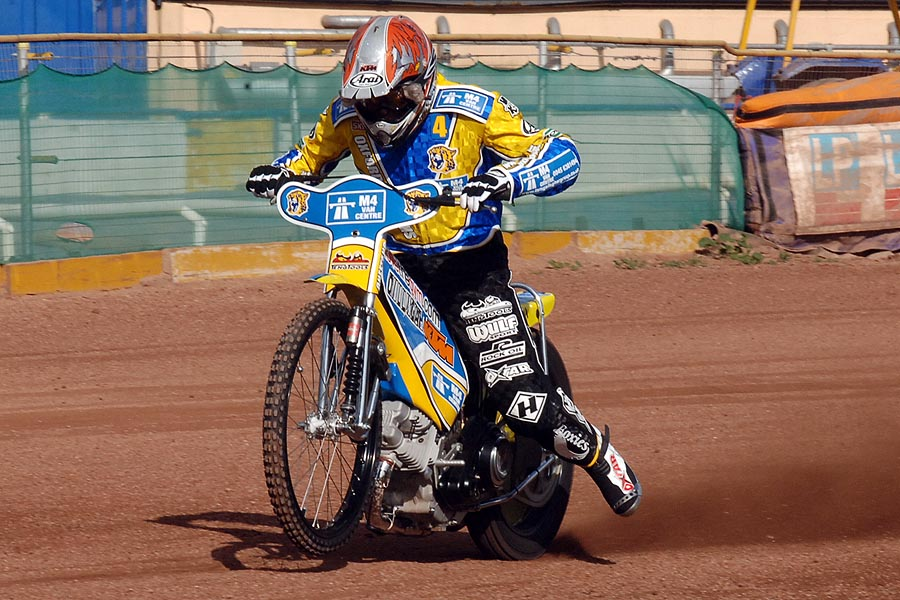
Steve Johnston riding for Oxford

Oxford Cheetahs recruited him the following season to ride at Oxford Stadium for the 1998 Elite League speedway season and he would spend five consecutive seasons with them including helping them win the Elite League championship.

Johnston went on to win a third Western Australian Individual Speedway Championship and represented the Australia speedway team in two Speedway World Cup finals in 2004 and 2005.

After the 2002 season with Oxford, Johnston became a journeyman rider by appearing for a different club every year from 2003 to 2010. However, he did have a very successful season in 2007. Initially he was due to ride the whole season on his return to Oxford, but after a couple of months, Oxford withdrew from the 2007 Elite League speedway season. This forced a move to the Coventry Bees, where he won the league and Knockout Cup double.

Johnston earned a testimonial meeting at Coventry in June 2008, while riding for Ipswich and he had one season at Somerset Rebels in 2009 and a successful season in 2010 for Birmingham Brummies in 2010 before retiring. He was part of the Birmingham four who won the Premier League Four-Team Championship, on 15 August 2010, at the East of England Arena.

== Speedway Grand Prix results ==
Year	Position	Points	Best finish	Notes
2002	27th	7	11th	Wildcard in Australian Grand Prix
