= Cardiff Dragons (speedway) =

Motorcycle speedway team in Wales

Club information
- Track address: Penarth Road Stadium; Penarth Road; Cardiff
- Country: Wales
- Founded: 1950
- Closed: 1953
- League: National League Division Three; Southern League

The Cardiff Dragons were a Speedway team which operated from 1950 until their closure in 1953. They were based at the Penarth Road Stadium in Penarth Road, Cardiff.

== History ==
After competing in open meetings for one season (in 1950) the Dragons inaugural league season was the 1951 Speedway National League Division Three, where they finished in 7th place. The following season they joined the Southern League (which was a new name for the third division). The finished runner-up behind Rayleigh Rockets during the 1952 Speedway Southern League. The team started the 1953 Speedway Southern League season and competed until June but then withdrew and had their results expunged.

== Season summary ==
Year and league	Position	Notes
1951 Speedway National League Division Three	7th	
1952 Speedway Southern League	2nd	
1953 Speedway Southern League	N/A	withdrew, results expunged
