= 1993 British League Division Two season =

British motorcycle speedway tier 2 league season

- League: British League Division Two
- No. of competitors: 11
- Champions: Glasgow Tigers
- Knockout Cup: Glasgow Tigers
- Individual: Gary Allan
- Fours: Edinburgh Monarchs
- Highest average: Jason Crump
- Division/s above: British League (Div 1)

The 1993 British League Division Two season was contested as the second division of Speedway in the United Kingdom.

== Summary ==
oxford Cheetahs and Swindon Robins joined the division but it lost Berwick Bandits and Stoke Potters.

The title was won by the Glasgow Tigers.

== Final table ==
Pos	Team	PL	W	D	L	BP	Pts
1	Glasgow Tigers	40	27	1	12	19	74
2	Long Eaton Invaders	40	25	0	15	13	63
3	Peterborough Panthers	40	24	0	16	13	61
4	Swindon Robins	40	23	1	16	13	60
5	Edinburgh Monarchs	40	20	1	19	15	56
6	Newcastle Diamonds	40	21	2	17	8	52
7	Middlesbrough Bears	40	21	0	19	8	50
8	Rye House Rockets	40	20	0	20	9	49
9	Sheffield Tigers	40	15	0	25	5	35
10	Exeter Falcons	40	12	0	28	3	27
11	Oxford Cheetahs	40	9	1	30	4	23

== Fixtures and results ==
A Fixtures

Home \ Away	ED	EX	GLA	LE	MID	NEW	OX	PET	RH	SHE	SWI
Edinburgh		74–34	58–50	64–44	61–47	63–45	62–46	70–38	53–55	85–23	67–39
Exeter	56–52		51–57	56–52	64–44	73–35	65–43	50–58	61–46	60–47	51–57
Glasgow	61–47	69–39		72–36	57–51	68–40	74–34	73–35	66–42	67–41	61–47
Long Eaton	57–51	72–36	63–45		69–38	63–44	71–37	44–28	58–50	81–26	70–38
Middlesbrough	60–48	60–47	51–57	48–60		63–45	74–34	64–44	59–49	64–44	64–44
Newcastle	56–52	55–53	54–54	62–46	53–55		63–45	59–48	78–29	67–41	53–53
Oxford	44–63	70–37	43–65	52–54	43–65	49–59		63–45	55–53	59–49	46–61
Peterborough	66–42	67–40	60–47	65–43	81–27	62–46	68–40		73–35	72–36	64–43
Rye House	52–56	69–39	59–49	46–61	59–49	57–51	64–44	62–46		65–42	55–53
Sheffield	61–47	80–28	64–44	58–50	66–42	58–50	53–55	42–66	67–41		61–47
Swindon	59–49	65–43	56–52	55–53	60–47	59.5–48.5	58–50	59–48	67–40	56–51	

Legend: Blue = home team win; Yellow = draw; Red = away team win.

B Fixtures

Home \ Away	ED	EX	GLA	LE	MID	NEW	OX	PET	RH	SHE	SWI
Edinburgh		80–28	57–51	60–48	50–58	75–31	60–48	72–34	55–53	73–35	59–49
Exeter	68–40		49–59	54–53	51–56	43–65	68–40	46–62	62–46	74–34	52–56
Glasgow	70–38	67–41		62–46	78–30	71–37	70–38	71–37	72–35	77–31	66–41
Long Eaton	58–50	75–33	70–38		75–33	61–47	74–34	61–46	56–52	61–47	56–52
Middlesbrough	55–53	81–27	43–65	58–50		47–61	66–42	56–51	56–52	80–28	56–52
Newcastle	56–52	71–36	57–50	61–46	58–49		64–44	49–59	62–46	45–27	60–47
Oxford	54–54	78–29	51–57	46–62	53–55	50–58		64–44	51–57	67–41	55–52
Peterborough	69–39	81–27	59–49	59–47	66–42	62–46	62–46		71–37	74–34	58–50
Rye House	63–45	73–35	52–56	57–50	55–53	64–44	70–37	66–41		70–38	55–52
Sheffield	59–49	63–44	62–46	51–57	64–44	51–57	68–40	60–48	53–55		62–46
Swindon	61–47	77–31	55–53	59–49	73–35	62–46	64–44	65–43	61–47	67–41	

Legend: Blue = home team win; Yellow = draw; Red = away team win.

== British League Division Two Phonesport Knockout Cup ==
The 1993 British League Division Two Knockout Cup was the 26th edition of the Knockout Cup for tier two teams. Glasgow Tigers were the winners of the competition.

First round

Date	Team one	Score	Team two
21/05	Peterborough	79-29	Oxford
09/05	Newcastle	57-50	Edinburgh
07/05	Edinburgh	61-47	Newcastle
05/05	Long Eaton	80-28	Sheffield
29/04	Sheffield	45-63	Long Eaton
14/04	Oxford	49-58	Peterborough

Quarter-finals

Date	Team one	Score	Team two
15/08	Rye House	64-43	Peterborough
13/08	Peterborough	72-36	Rye House
01/07	Middlesbrough	51-57	Glasgow
30/06	Long Eaton	53-54	Edinburgh
21/06	Exeter	57-51	Swindon
20/06	Edinburgh	60-48	Long Eaton
20/06	Glasgow	70-38	Middlesbrough
19/06	Swindon	60-48	Exeter

Semi-finals

Date	Team one	Score	Team two
08/10	Peterborough	55-53	Glasgow
03/10	Glasgow	73-35	Peterborough
07/08	Swindon	61-47	Edinburgh
06/08	Edinburgh	60-48	Swindon

Final

First leg

16 October 1993

Swindon Robins Jason Crump 18 Gary Allan 8 Steve Camden 8 Alun Rossiter Steve Masters Glenn Cunningham Gary Chessell	54 – 54	Glasgow Tigers Róbert Nagy 16 David Walsh 10 Nigel Crabtree 10 Jesper Olsen Mick Powell James Grieves David Nagel Shane Bowes R/R

Abbey Stadium

Second leg

17 October 1993

Glasgow Tigers Mick Powell 15 Róbert Nagy 13 Nigel Crabtree 10 David Walsh 10 James Grieves 9 Jesper Olsen 4 David Nagel 3	64 – 44	Swindon Robins Jason Crump 15 Gary Allan 12 Alun Rossiter Steve Masters Glenn Cunningham Gary Chessell Steve Camden

Shawfield Stadium

Glasgow were declared Knockout Cup Champions, winning on aggregate 118–98.

== Riders' Championship ==
Gary Allan won the Riders' Championship. The final sponsored by Jawa Moto & Barum was held on 25 September at the Norfolk Arena.

Pos.	Rider	Pts	Total
1	(New Zealand) Gary Allan	3 2 3 3 2	13+3
2	(Australia) Mick Poole	2 3 2 3 3	13+2
3	(Australia) Tony Langdon	3 2 3 3 1	12+3
4	(England) Paul Thorp	2 1 3 3 3	12+2
5	(Denmark) Jan Staechmann	3 2 3 1 3	12+1
6	(Australia) Jason Crump	2 3 r 2 2	9
7	(Hungary) Robert Nagy	3 r 1 1 3	8
8	(Denmark) Jens Rasmussen (res)	2 1 2 2 1	8
9	(England) Martin Goodwin	0 3 2 r 2	7
10	(England) Peter Carr	1 0 2 2 2	7
11	(England) Neil Collins	1 3 1 1 0	6
12	(England) Daz Sumner	0 2 1 0 1	4
13	(England) Les Collins	0 0 0 2 1	3
14	(England) Nigel Crabtree	1 1 0 1 0	3
15	(Scotland) Kenny McKinna	1 1 0 0 0	2
16	(England) Mark Simmonds	0 0 1 0 0	1
17	(New Zealand) Mark Thorpe	- - - -	0

- f=fell, r-retired, ex=excluded, ef=engine failure t=touched tapes

== Fours ==
Edinburgh Monarchs won the fours championship final, held at the East of England Arena on 25 July.

Final

Pos	Team	Pts	Riders
1	Edinburgh	22	Collins L 7, McKinna 6, Coles 6, Lamb 3
2	Swindon	20	Allan 9, Crump 5, Rossiter 4, Leaver 2
3	Long Eaton	18	Hellsen 7, Steachmann 4, Dixon 4, Collins N 3
4	Rye House	12	Teurnberg 5, Goodwin 3, Rasmussen 2, O'Brien 2, Pedersen 0

== Final leading averages ==
Rider	Team	Average
Jason Crump	Swindon	10.50
Róbert Nagy	Glasgow	10.18
Jan Stæchmann	Long Eaton	10.16
Paul Thorp	Newcastle	9.90
Neil Collins	Long Eaton	9.60
Mark Thorpe	Newcastle	9.28
Shane Bowes	Glasgow	8.99
Tony Langdon	Oxford	8.99
Gary Allan	Swindon	8.93
Mick Poole	Peterborough	8.90

== Riders & final averages ==
Edinburgh

- Michael Coles 8.57
- Kenny McKinna 8.25
- Les Collins 8.12
- Vesa Ylinen 7.43
- Scott Lamb 6.96
- Kevin Little 6.29
- Sean Courtney 5.77
- Peter Scully 5.68
- Mike Lewthwaite 5.33
- Stewart McDonald 3.53

Exeter

- Richard Green 7.97
- Gordon Kennett 6.93
- Paul Fry 6.88
- Mark Simmonds 6.01
- Scott Pegler 5.57
- Tommy Palmer 5.52
- Frank Smart 4.91
- David Steen 4.76
- Václav Verner 4.59
- Ian Humphreys 2.73
- Graeme Gordon 1.22

Glasgow

- Robert Nagy 10.18
- Shane Bowes 8.99
- Nigel Crabtree 8.12
- David Walsh 7.75
- Mick Powell 7.43
- James Grieves 6.72
- Jesper Olsen 6.29
- David Nagel 4.43

Long Eaton

- Jan Stæchmann 10.16
- Neil Collins 9.60
- Carl Blackbird 8.08
- Martin Dixon 7.79
- David Blackburn 7.51
- Richard Hellsen 7.15
- Mike Hampson 5.68
- Steve Johnston 5.64
- Nigel Sparshott 4.58
- Ade Hoole 4.52
- Ian Barney 1.70

Middlesbrough

- Steve Regeling 7.75
- Brett Saunders 7.60
- Daz Sumner 7.44
- Mike Smith 6.53
- Paul Pickering 6.46
- Mark Courtney 6.23
- Wayne Carter 6.15
- Duncan Chapman 4.95
- Chris Readshaw 4.07
- Stuart Swales 3.38

Newcastle

- Paul Thorp 9.90
- Mark Thorpe 9.28
- Garry Stead 7.17
- Richard Juul 5.62
- Scott Robson 5.58
- Stuart Parnaby 5.24
- Phil Jeffrey 4.67
- Stuart Robson 4.35
- Andre Compton 1.10

Oxford

- Tony Langdon 8.99
- Alan Grahame 7.05
- David Smart 6.97
- Andy Meredith 6.35
- Spencer Timmo 5.66
- Rene Madsen 5.53
- Mark Blackbird 5.33
- David Clarke 4.87
- Chris Cobby 4.55
- Andy Hackett .4.41
- Paul Blackbird 4.29
- Gary Sweet 3.30

Peterborough

- Mick Poole 8.90
- Alan Mogridge 7.29
- Eric Monaghan 7.29
- Paul Hurry 7.04
- Rod Colquhoun 6.84
- Hans Clausen 6.72
- Ronni Pedersen 6.56
- Jason Gage 6.51
- Kieran McCullagh 5.44
- Scott Kirton 4.94

Rye House

- Martin Goodwin 8.23
- Jens Rasmussen 8.04
- Jan Pedersen 7.33
- Lawrence Hare 7.11
- Darren Spicer 6.93
- Mikael Teurnberg 6.30
- Trevor O'Brien 5.31
- Paul Whittaker 5.05
- Martin Cobbin 4.43
- Chris Young 3.06

Sheffield

- Roman Matousek 8.58
- Peter Carr 8.57
- Chris Morton 6.66
- Louis Carr 5.91
- David Blackburn 5.86
- Rene Aas 5.66
- Rob Woffinden 5.06
- Glyn Taylor 4.95
- Steve Knott 4.93
- Dean Child 3.72
- Steve Cope 2.80
- Will Beveridge 2.28

Swindon

- Jason Crump 10.50
- Gary Allan 8.93
- Alun Rossiter 7.40
- Gary Chessell 6.60
- Nigel Leaver 6.16
- Glenn Cunningham 6.01
- Steve Camden 4.72
- Steve Masters 3.56
- Andy Mountain 2.67
- Martin Willis 2.40

== See also ==
- List of United Kingdom Speedway League Champions
- Knockout Cup (speedway)
