= 1990 National League season =

British motorcycle speedway tier 2 league season

- League: National League
- Champions: Poole Pirates
- Knockout Cup: Poole Pirates
- Individual: Andy Grahame
- Pairs: Hackney Kestrels
- Fours: Stoke Potters
- Highest average: Steve Schofield
- Division/s above: 1990 British League

The 1990 National League was the 16th since its establishment as a second tier in 1975, a renamed British League Division Two, and the last before it was again renamed British League Division Two.

== Summary ==
The league was initially supposed to run with 18 teams - however, Mildenhall Fen Tigers were unable to form a team to the 42-point minimum average limit, and were expelled on March 22, 1990. Matches were once again run over a 16-heat formula, with seven riders per team.

Poole Pirates were again champions, and stepped up into British League Division One for the 1991 season.

== League table ==
Pos	Club	M	Home			Away			F	A	Pts
Pos	Club	M	W	D	L	W	D	L	F	A	Pts
1	Poole Pirates	32	16	0	0	13	0	3	1779	1224	58
2	Middlesbrough Bears	32	16	0	0	6	2	8	1701	1367	46
3	Ipswich Witches	32	13	2	1	9	0	7	1674	1387	46
4	Glasgow Tigers	32	13	0	3	6	0	10	1643.5	1419,5	38
5	Hackney Kestrels	32	13	0	3	6	0	10	1608	1451	38
6	Berwick Bandits	32	15	0	1	3	1	12	1575.5	1483.5	37
7	Wimbledon Dons	32	12	1	3	4	2	10	1376	1469	35
8	Stoke Potters	32	11	0	5	5	1	10	1573	1489	33
9	Exeter Falcons	32	14	0	2	1	1	14	1576	1489	31
10	Peterborough Panthers	32	13	0	3	2	0	14	1456	1613	30
11	Eastbourne Eagles	32	12	0	4	3	0	13	1426	1636	30
12	Newcastle Diamonds	32	11	0	5	3	0	13	1478.5	1586.5	28
13	Edinburgh Monarchs	32	10	1	5	2	0	14	1520.5	1539.5	25
14	Arena Essex Hammers	32	9	1	5	3	0	13	1380	1674	25
15	Rye House Rockets	32	7	0	9	1	0	15	1386	1672	16
16	Long Eaton Invaders	32	7	2	7	0	0	16	1372	1697	16
17	Milton Keynes Knights	32	5	0	11	1	0	15	1286	1770	12

M = Meetings; W = Wins; D = Draws; L = Losses; F = Race points for; A = Race points against; Pts = Total Points

== Fixtures and results ==
Home \ Away	AE	BER	EAS	ED	EX	GLA	HAC	IPS	LE	MID	MK	NEW	PET	PP	RH	STO	WIM
Arena Essex		58–38	38–58	57–36	62–34	44–52	54–42	47–49	51–43	48–48	47–49	47–49	52–43	41–51	51–45	50–46	50–46
Berwick	71–25		61–35	48–45	63–32	51–44	46–47	49–47	54–42	51–45	68–27	68–27	73–23	61–35	68–28	56–40	53–42
Eastbourne	39–56	58–38		62–34	66–30	53–42	51–45	46–49	49–47	42–54	56–39	49–46	53–43	35–61	61–34	54–42	54–42
Edinburgh	67–29	46.5–49.5	60–36		66–29	43–52	40–56	31–64	71–25	45–51	66–30	56–40	62–34	53–43	51–45	49–47	48–48
Exeter	76–20	56–40	63–32	56–39		60–35	45–51	53–43	65–31	67–29	64–32	55–41	68–28	44–52	64–32	53–43	62–34
Glasgow	74–22	60–36	66–30	53–43	61–35		54–42	62–33	74–22	57–39	63–32	51.5–44.5	64–32	46–49	60–36	45–51	44–52
Hackney	44–50	61–35	62–33	52–44	51–45	50–46		53–42	62–34	43–53	67–29	60–35	59–37	47–49	68–28	57–39	51–45
Ipswich	70–25	48–48	63–33	56–40	50–46	56–40	48–47		55–41	60–36	65–31	60–36	63–33	44–51	67–28	48–48	53–43
Long Eaton	54–42	46–50	41–55	52–44	48–48	40–56	49–47	43–53		40–56	56–40	54–42	69–27	45–51	49–47	44–52	48–48
Middlesbrough	53–43	71–25	61–35	65–31	61–34	60–36	58–38	53–43	62–34		68–28	55–41	70–26	59–37	58–37	52–44	60–35
Milton Keynes	53–42	46–49	41–55	46–50	40–56	40–56	45–51	44–49	59–37	39–57		49–46	51–45	44–52	48–47	37–59	42–53
Newcastle	55–41	50–46	51–45	54–42	55–41	45–50	44–52	47–49	50–46	48–47	63–33		55–41	45–51	51–44	50–46	39–57
Peterborough	67–29	64–32	74–22	53–43	50–36	67–29	61–35	41–55	52–44	50–46	59–37	51–45		29–67	57–39	46–49	57–39
Poole	61–35	70–26	71–25	52–43	57–39	62–34	63–32	59–37	56–40	58–38	56–40	63–33	58–38		73–23	57–39	54–42
Rye House	46–49	52–43	62–33	43–52	55–40	46–49	50–46	44–52	56–39	59–37	51–45	39–57	47–49	36–60		45–49	47–49
Stoke	54–40	58–38	54–42	62–34	61–35	50–46	47–49	40–56	61–35	45–51	55–37	41–55	66–30	44–52	50–46		51–45
Wimbledon	61–35	55–41	66–29	50–46	61–35	54–42	52–41	49–47	62–34	48–48	62–33	57–39	46–49	47–48	47–49	55–40	

Legend: Blue = home team win; Yellow = draw; Red = away team win.

== National League Knockout Cup ==
The 1990 National League Knockout Cup was the 23rd edition of the Knockout Cup for tier two teams. Poole Pirates were the winners of the competition.

First round

Date	Team one	Score	Team two
14/04	Berwick	62-33	Long Eaton
11/04	Long Eaton	57-39	Berwick

Second round

Date	Team one	Score	Team two
21/07	Berwick	50-44	Poole
27/06	Wimbledon	62-33	Exeter
15/06	Hackney	64-32	Eastbourne
10/06	Eastbourne	40-56	Hackney
10/06	Rye House	51-45	Milton Keynes
07/06	Middlesbrough	51-44	Edinburgh
05/06	Milton Keynes	56-39	Rye House
05/06	Poole	56-40	Berwick
04/06	Exeter	61-35	Wimbledon
03/06	Edinburgh	51-45	Middlesbrough
03/06	Glasgow	54-41	Ipswich
03/06	Newcastle	61-35	Arena Essex
02/06	Arena Essex	41-55	Newcastle
02/06	Stoke	65-31	Peterborough
01/06	Peterborough	48-48	Stoke
31/05	Ipswich	60-36	Glasgow

Quarter-finals

Date	Team one	Score	Team two
21/08	Poole	62-33	Hackney
10/08	Hackney	47-48	Poole
29/07	Newcastle	54-41	Ipswich
21/07	Stoke	51-45	Wimbledon
19/07	Middlesbrough	69-27	Milton Keynes
18/07	Wimbledon	57-37	Stoke
17/07	Milton Keynes	40-56	Middlesbrough
19/07	Ipswich	61-35	Newcastle

Semi-finals

Date	Team one	Score	Team two
30/08	Ipswich	47-49	Poole
28/08	Poole	60-36	Ipswich
23/08	Middlesbrough	69-27	Wimbledon
22/08	Wimbledon	36-59	Middlesbrough

Final

First leg

18 September 1990

Poole Pirates Craig Boyce 19 Alun Rossiter 13 Gary Allan 11 Tony Langdon 10 Rod Colquhoun 6 Gary Chessell 3 Tom P. Knudsen R/R	62 – 34	Middlesbrough Bears Rod Hunter 11 Jamie Luckhurst 7 Daz Sumner 5 Paul Bentley 5 David Cheshire 3 Dave Edwards 2 Steve Wilcock 1

Wimborne Road

Second leg

20 September 1990

Middlesbrough Bears Rod Hunter 9 Steve Wilcock 9 Daz Sumner 9 Paul Bentley 9 Jamie Luckhurst 7 David Cheshire 7 Dave Edwards 1	51 – 45	Poole Pirates Craig Boyce 16 Gary Allan 11 Tony Langdon 10 Rod Colquhoun 4 Alun Rossiter 3 Justin Elkins 1 Tom P. Knudsen R/R

Cleveland Park Stadium

Poole were declared Knockout Cup Champions, winning on aggregate 107–85.

== Riders' Championship ==
Andy Grahame won the Riders' Championship. The final sponsored by Jawa Moto & Barum was held on 15 September at Brandon Stadium.

Pos.	Rider	Pts	Total
1	(England) Andy Grahame	2 3 3 3 3	14
2	(England) Chris Louis	3 2 2 3 3	13
3	(Australia) Craig Boyce	3 3 2 3 0	11+3
4	(New Zealand) David Bargh	2 3 3 1 2	11+2
5	(Australia) Steve Regeling	1 2 3 2 2	10
6	(England) Steve Schofield	3 1 2 1 2	9
7	(England) Les Collins	3 0 r 2 3	8
8	(England) Martin Goodwin	2 1 1 3 1	8
9	(England) Eric Monaghan	1 1 3 2 1	8
10	(Australia) Rod Hunter	2 3 0 0 1	6
11	(England) David Walsh	f f 2 0 3	5
12	(Sweden) Richard Hellsen	1 2 1 1 1	6
13	(Australia) Shane Bowes	1 2 fex 1 2	6
14	(England) Gordon Kennett	0 1 1 2 0	4
15	(Australia) Mick Poole	fex r 1 0 0	1
16	(Denmark) Jens Rasmussen	r - - - -	0
17	(England) Andy Meredith (res)	0 0	0
18	(England) Lee Coleman (res)	0 0	0

- f=fell, r-retired, ex=excluded, ef=engine failure t=touched tapes

== Pairs ==
The National League Pairs Championship was held at Shawfield Stadium Glasgow on 17 June. The event was won by Hackney Kestrels.

Group A
Pos	Team	Pts	Riders
1	Hackney	18	Schofield; Galvin
2	Ipswich	15	
3	Poole	10	
4	Rye House	9	

Group B
Pos	Team	Pts	Riders
1	Newcastle	17	Bargh; Carr P
2	Long Eaton	15	Hellsen 11; Smart 4
3	Wimbledon	12	
4	Arena Essex	10	

Group C
Pos	Team	Pts	Riders
1	Exeter	18	Regeling 11; Jeffrey 7
2	Stoke	18	Crabtree 10; Carr L 8
3	Peterborough	11	
4	Eastbourne	5	

Group D
Pos	Team	Pts	Riders
1	Middlesbrough	19	
2	Berwick	14	
3	Edinburgh	12	
4	Glasgow	9	

Semi finals

- Hackney bt Middlesbrough
- Exeter bt Newcastle

Final

- Hackney bt Exeter

== Fours ==
Stoke won the Fours championship final, held at the East of England Showground on 22 July.

Semi finals

- SF1 = Ipswich 16, Stoke 11, Wimbledon 11, Glasgow 10
- SF2 = Poole 16, Hackney 13, Berwick 10, Middlesbrough 9

Final

Pos	Team	Pts	Riders
1	Stoke	16	Monaghan 6, Carr 5, Crabtree 4, Cobby 1 Carlson 0
2	Poole	13	Rossiter 5, Langdon 4, Boyce 3, Allan 1
3	Hackney	10	Schofield 5, Galvin 3, Whittaker 2, Tagg 0
4	Ipswich	9	Louis 4, Parker 2, Standing 2, Mogridge 1

== Final leading averages ==
The top ten rider averages in the National League as of October 31, 1990:

	Rider	Average	Team
1	(England) Steve Schofield	10.51	Hackney
2	(Australia) Craig Boyce	10.45	Poole
3	(Australia) Steve Regeling	10.20	Exeter
4	(England) Chris Louis	10.19	Ipswich
5	(Australia) Rod Hunter	9.93	Middlesbrough
6	(New Zealand) David Bargh	9.72	Newcastle
7	(Australia) Mick Poole	9.58	Peterborough
8	(England) Andy Grahame	9.40	Wimbledon
9	(Denmark) Jens Rasmussen	9.36	Rye House
10	(England) Andy Galvin	9.27	Hackney

== Riders & final averages ==
Arena Essex

- Martin Goodwin 8.85
- Rob Tilbury 8.09
- Wayne Garratt 5.77
- Troy Pratt 5.65
- Kevin Brice 4.95
- Adrian Stevens 4.48
- Simon Wolstenholme 4.31
- Kevin Teager 3.88
- Robert Ledwith 2.86

Berwick

- Mark Courtney 8.67
- David Walsh 8.62
- David Blackburn 7.87
- Andy Campbell 6.39
- Alan Rivett 6.04
- Rob Grant Sr. 5.89
- Scott Robson 5.77
- Kevin Little 3.80
- Steve Widt 3.47

Eastbourne

- Gordon Kennett 8.94
- Andy Buck 6.99
- Tony Primmer 6.49
- Paul Woods 6.24
- Darren Standing 5.76
- Brian Nixon 5.52
- Keith Pritchard 5.52
- Justin Walker 4.82
- Darren Grayling 4.12

Edinburgh

- Les Collins 8.76
- Frede Schott 7.81
- Carl Blackbird 7.14
- Brett Saunders 6.98
- Michael Coles 6.09
- Scott Lamb 5.59
- Mick Powell 4.02
- Nigel Alderton 2.75

Exeter

- Steve Regeling 10.20
- Peter Jeffery 7.71
- Richard Green 7.68
- Colin Cook 6.61
- Andy Sell 5.73
- Steve Bishop 5.19
- Mark Simmonds 4.79
- Ian Barney 3.86

Glasgow

- Steve Lawson 8.83
- Kenny McKinna 8.54
- Shane Bowes 8.42
- Charlie McKinna 6.68
- Sean Courtney 6.58
- Phil Jeffrey 5.87
- Jason Lyons 5.79
- Geoff Powell 3.57
- Martin McKinna 3.04

Hackney

- Steve Schofield .10.51
- Andy Galvin 9.27
- Paul Whittaker 8.18
- Gary Tagg 5.96
- Michael Warren 5.45
- Dave Hamnett 4.41
- Tim Korneliussen 3.96
- Shawn Venables 3.80
- Ian Humphreys 2.91

Ipswich

- Chris Louis 10.18
- David Norris 8.30
- Dean Standing 8.02
- Alan Mogridge 7.81
- Shane Parker 6.45
- Robbie Fuller 5.07
- Colin White 2.53
- Craig Hyde 2.47

Long Eaton

- Richard Hellsen 8.43
- Nigel De'ath 6.91
- Kevin Smart 6.03
- Paul Fry 6.02
- Jon Surman 4.63
- Gary O'Hare 4.60
- Peter Lloyd 4.20

Middlesbrough

- Rod Hunter 9.93
- Daz Sumner 8.62
- David Cheshire 7.42
- Jamie Luckhurst .7.36
- Steve Wilcock 7.32
- Paul Bentley 7.26
- Duncan Chapman 3.62
- Dave Edwards 3.41

Milton Keynes

- Peter Glanz 7.24
- Jonathan Cooper 6.00
- Mark Blackbird 5.52
- David Clarke 5.47
- Trevor Banks 5.45
- Mark Lyndon 5.33
- Andy Hines 5.03
- Rob Woffinden 4.59
- Thierry Hilaire 3.68

Newcastle

- David Bargh 9.72
- Peter Carr 8.35
- Martin Dixon 7.40
- Simon Green 5.97
- Mark Thorpe 5.37
- Ian Stead 4.42
- Paul Smith 3.95
- Spencer Timmo 2.60
- John Wainwright 2.46

Peterborough

- Mick Poole 9.58
- Craig Hodgson 8.04
- Frank Andersen 7.83
- Scott Norman 6.91
- Ian Barney 6.72
- Nigel Flatman 5.77
- Mark Lyndon 4.46
- Wayne Bridgeford 3.70
- Sean Barker 2.98

Poole

- Craig Boyce 10.44
- Tom P. Knudsen 8.72
- Alun Rossiter 8.64
- Tony Langdon 8.23
- Gary Allan 7.51
- Gary Chessell 6.87
- Rod Colquhoun 5.73
- Steve Langdon 4.38

Rye House

- Jens Rasmussen 9.36
- Melvyn Taylor 8.86
- Glen Baxter 7.70
- Roger Johns 6.08
- Jamie Fagg 5.71
- Trevor O'Brien 5.39
- Scott Humphries 4.69
- Wayne Baxter 3.56
- Nigel Sparshott 3.14
- Kelvin Mullarkey 2.81
- Wayne Bridgeford 2.62
- Linden Warner 2.26

Stoke

- Eric Monaghan 9.00
- Nigel Crabtree 8.78
- Louis Carr 8.28
- Chris Cobby 5.74
- Mark Pearce 4.83
- Rob Woffinden 4.61
- David Clarke 4.00
- Mark Carlson 1.88
- Richard Davidson 1.88

Wimbledon

- Andy Grahame 9.40
- Nathan Simpson 8.00
- Ray Morton 7.52
- Neville Tatum 7.38
- Nigel Leaver 5.41
- Pete Chapman 4.99
- Deon Prinsloo 3.48
- Justin Pryor 3.34

== See also ==
- Speedway in the United Kingdom
- List of United Kingdom Speedway League Champions
