= 1994 British League Division Two season =

Sports event

- League: British League Division Two
- No. of competitors: 10
- Champions: Glasgow Tigers
- Knockout Cup: Glasgow Tigers
- Individual: Paul Bentley
- Pairs: Swindon Robins
- Fours: Oxford Cheetahs
- Highest average: Jan Stæchmann
- Division/s above: British League (Div 1)
- Division/s below: British League (Div 3)

The 1994 British League Division Two season was contested as the second division of Speedway in the United Kingdom. The British League Divisions 2 and 3 were disbanded after this season and did not return until 1997. An Academy League was introduced.

== Summary ==
Rye House Rockets did not start the season because the promoters Roger Shute and Peter Redfern left the club leaving Ronnie Russell in sole charge. Russell failed to secure the necessary funding to continue and the Rockets were disbanded.

The league title and knockout Cup was won by the Glasgow Tigers, who achieved the feat of recording the 'double double' (the league and cup double for two consecutive seasons).

== Final table ==
Pos	Team	PL	W	D	L	BP	Pts
1	Glasgow Tigers	36	26	1	9	14	67
2	Long Eaton Invaders	36	24	2	10	15	65
3	Edinburgh Monarchs	36	20	1	15	10	51
4	Swindon Robins	36	18	1	17	12	49
5	Peterborough Panthers	36	18	2	16	10	48
6	Middlesbrough Bears	36	19	1	16	9	48
7	Newcastle Diamonds	36	15	1	20	9	40
8	Oxford Cheetahs	36	15	1	20	7	38
9	Sheffield Tigers	36	10	1	25	3	24
10	Exeter Falcons	36	9	1	26	1	20

== Fixtures and results ==
A Fixtures

Home \ Away	ED	EX	GLA	LE	MID	NEW	OX	PET	SHE	SWI
Edinburgh		61–34	40–56	53–42	52–44	55–40	57–39	56–40	64–32	63–33
Exeter	51–44		45–51	37–59	42–54	54–42	52–44	45–50	46–49	41–55
Glasgow	63–33	74–22		67–28	62–33	56–40	56–40	61–35	66–30	57–39
Long Eaton	48–48	58–38	48–48		53–43	50–46	56–40	46–50	59–37	58–38
Middlesbrough	64–32	61–35	45–50	50–46		54–42	65–31	47–49	64–32	50–46
Newcastle	59–37	51–44	56–40	42–54	44–52		58–37	46–50	65–30	48–35
Oxford	51–45	70–26	36–60	45–51	42–54	43–52		51–44	52–43	55–41
Peterborough	65–31	63–32	57–39	47–48	49–47	42–54	40–44		65–31	55–41
Sheffield	45–51	57–39	40–56	47–49	37–59	47–49	44–52	51–45		46–50
Swindon	47–49	55–41	47–49	56–40	40–55	53–43	56–40	49–47	58–38	

Legend: Blue = home team win; Yellow = draw; Red = away team win.

B Fixtures

Home \ Away	ED	EX	GLA	LE	MID	NEW	OX	PET	SHE	SWI
Edinburgh		68–28	54–42	49–47	65–31	51–44	60–35	56–40	67–29	51–45
Exeter	54–42		49–47	50–46	50–46	56–40	49–47	47–49	48–48	46–50
Glasgow	60–36	63–33		51–45	67–29	67–29	62–34	59–37	76–20	51–45
Long Eaton	56–40	56–40	52–43		62–34	52–44	58–38	61–35	60–36	59–37
Middlesbrough	51–45	58–38	43–52	45–50		55.5–40.5	49–47	49–47	52–44	47–49
Newcastle	62–34	69–27	52–43	47–48	56–40		40–56	48–48	52–44	54–42
Oxford	46–50	66–30	44–52	53–43	44–52	53–42		54–42	64–32	44–52
Peterborough	52–44	53–42	66–29	47–49	48–48	50–46	41–51		57–39	48–47
Sheffield	60–36	62–34	55–41	48–47	61–35	49–47	41–55	44–52		49–46
Swindon	55–41	67–29	57–39	45–51	57–39	56–40	48–48	49–47	56–40	

Legend: Blue = home team win; Yellow = draw; Red = away team win.

== British League Division Two Knockout Cup ==
The 1994 British League Division Two Knockout Cup was the 27th edition of the Knockout Cup for tier two teams. Glasgow Tigers were the winners of the competition for the second successive year.

First round

Date	Team one	Score	Team two
29/04	Edinburgh	54-42	Newcastle
24/04	Newcastle	46-50	Edinburgh
24/04	Glasgow	56-40	Oxford
22/04	Oxford	39-57	Glasgow

Quarter-finals

Date	Team one	Score	Team two
30/07	Swindon	56-40	Glasgow
10/06	Peterborough	58-38	Sheffield
09/06	Middlesbrough	62-34	Exeter
09/06	Sheffield	44-52	Peterborough
06/06	Exeter	50-46	Middlesbrough
05/06	Glasgow	66-30	Swindon
04/06	Swindon	rain	Glasgow
03/06	Edinburgh	49-47	Long Eaton
01/06	Long Eaton	45-51	Edinburgh

Semi-finals

Date	Team one	Score	Team two
23/09	Peterborough	50-45	Glasgow
16/09	Peterborough	rain	Glasgow
11/09	Glasgow	54-42	Peterborough
12/08	Edinburgh	52-44	Middlesbrough
11/08	Middlesbrough	49-47	Edinburgh

Final

First leg

14 October 1994

Edinburgh Monarchs Kenny McKinna 12 Les Collins 11 Scott Lamb 11 Jan Andersen 9 Kevin Little 4 Stuart Robson 3 Lawrence Hare 0	50 – 46	Glasgow Tigers David Walsh 14 Mick Powell 9 Nigel Crabtree 9 Sean Courtney 7 Róbert Nagy 4 James Grieves 2 Stewart McDonald 1

Powderhall Stadium

Second leg

16 October 1994

Glasgow Tigers David Walsh 13 Nigel Crabtree 10 Sean Courtney 9 Róbert Nagy 9 Mick Powell 8 James Grieves 5 Stewart McDonald 1	55 – 41	Edinburgh Monarchs Kenny McKinna 12 Les Collins 10 Scott Lamb 9 Jan Andersen 6 Stuart Robson 3 Kevin Little 1 Lawrence Hare 0

Shawfield Stadium

Glasgow were declared Knockout Cup Champions, winning on aggregate 101–91.

== Riders' Championship ==
Paul Bentley won the Riders' Championship. The final sponsored by Jawa Moto & Barum was held on 17 September at Brandon Stadium.

Pos.	Rider	Pts	Total
1	(England) Paul Bentley	3 3 3 2 2	13
2	(Sweden) Tony Olsson	3 3 2 2 2	12
3	(Australia) Tony Langdon	1 1 3 3 3	11
4	(England) Alan Grahame	2 0 2 3 3	10
5	(Czech Republic) Roman Matoušek	2 1 3 3 1	10
6	(Australia) Mick Poole	2 2 1 3 1	9
7	(Scotland) Kenny McKinna	3 0 1 1 3	8
8	(England) Martin Dixon	3 2 2 1 0	8
9	(Hungary) Róbert Nagy	0 3 1 0 3	7
10	(Denmark) Ronni Pedersen	1 1 1 2 2	7
11	(Czech Republic) Zdeněk Tesař	0 0 3 1 2	6
12	(New Zealand) Mark Thorpe	0 3 0 2 0	5
13	(England) Les Collins	1 2 2 0 0	5
14	(England) Paul Fry	2 2 0 0 1	5
15	(England) Nigel Crabtree	0 1 0 1 0	2
16	(Sweden) Richard Hellsen	1 0 0 0 1	2

== Pairs ==
The British League Division Two Pairs Championship, sponsored by the Speedway Star, was held at Arena Essex Raceway on 28 May. The event was won by Swindon Robins.

Qualifying
Pos	Team	Pts	Riders
1	Swindon	20	Olsson 12, Langdon 8
2	Glasgow	17	Crabtree 12, Walsh 5
3	Edinburgh	16	Ylinen 9, Collins L 7
4	Peterborough	16	Tesar 12, Monaghan 4
5	Long Eaton	14	Collins N 8, Dixon 6

Qualifying
Pos	Team	Pts	Riders
6	Middlesbrough	13	Sumner 7, Bentley 6
7	Newcastle	13	Thorpe 10, Juul 3
8	Oxford	9	Goodwin 6, Poole 3
9	Exeter	9	Svab 9, Verner 0
10	Sheffield	8	Matousek 8, Bartlett 0

Semi finals

- Swindon bt Peterborough
- Glasgow bt Edinburgh

Final

- Swindon bt Glasgow

== Fours ==
Oxford Cheetahs won the fours championship final, held at the East of England Arena on 7 August.

Final

Pos	Team	Pts	Riders
1	Oxford Cheetahs	24	Goodwin 11, Poole 7, Karlsson 5, Alan Grahame 1, Sumner 0
2	Long Eaton Invaders	17	Dixon 7, Collins N 5, Johnston 4, Hellsen 1
3	Peterborough Panthers	16	Tesar 7, Monaghan 4, Pedersen 3, Sullivan 1, Nicholls 1
4	Edinburgh Monarchs	15	Lamb 5, McKinna 4, Collins L 3, Andersen 3, Hare 0

== Final leading averages ==
Rider	Team	Average
Jan Stæchmann	Long Eaton	10.10
Tony Olsson	Swindon	10.07
Nigel Crabtree	Glasgow	9.74
David Walsh	Glasgow	9.72
Paul Bentley	Middlesbrough	9.39
Robert Nagy	Glasgow	9.18
Zdeněk Tesař	Peterborough	9.13
Martin Dixon	Long Eaton	8.94
Mark Thorpe	Newcastle	8.95
Michael Coles	Edinburgh	8.57

== Riders and final averages ==
Edinburgh

- Kenny McKinna 8.40
- Les Collins 8.23
- Scott Lamb 7.85
- Vesa Ylinen 7.68
- Jan Andersen 7.12
- Lawrence Hare 5.48
- Kevin Little 4.91
- Peter Scully 3.62

Exeter

- Paul Fry 7.66
- Antonín Šváb Jr. 6.99
- Václav Verner 6.44
- David Smart 6.38
- Mark Simmonds 6.29
- Mika Pellinen 6.24
- Andreas Bössner 5.30
- Scott Pegler 4.87
- Nigel Leaver 3.73
- Tommy Palmer 3.52
- Henk Bangma 2.29

Glasgow

- Nigel Crabtree 9.74
- David Walsh 9.72
- Robert Nagy 9.18
- Mick Powell 7.22
- Sean Courtney 6.36
- James Grieves 6.01
- Jesper Olsen 4.90
- Stewart McDonald 3.67

Long Eaton

- Jan Stæchmann 10.10
- Martin Dixon 8.94
- Neil Collins 8.07
- Richard Hellsen 7.86
- Steve Johnston 7.48
- Stuart Swales 4.47
- Mike Hampson 3.89
- Mark Bruton 2.74
- Scott Kirton 2.00

Middlesbrough

- Paul Bentley 9.39
- Jens Rasmussen 7.01
- Daz Sumner 6.99
- Alan Mogridge 6.71
- Stuart Swales 6.08
- Mike Smith 5.96
- Paul Whittaker 5.5
- Chris Readshaw 4.25
- Will Beveridge 1.79

Newcastle

- Mark Thorpe 8.95
- Scott Robson 7.39
- Garry Stead 7.19
- Richard Juul 6.67
- Petri Kokko 6.15
- Stuart Robson 4.95
- Chris Readshaw 4.94
- Max Schofield 4.85
- Anthony Barlow 2.55

Oxford

- Mick Poole 8.44
- Martin Goodwin 7.65
- Daz Sumner 7.06
- Alan Grahame 6.96
- Niklas Karlsson 6.86
- David Smart 6.15
- Rene Madsen 5.85
- Stefan Ekberg 5.54
- Andy Meredith 4.55
- Stephen Morris 4.48
- Spencer Timmo 2.75

Peterborough

- Zdeněk Tesař 9.13
- Carl Stonehewer 8.33
- Ronni Pedersen 7.60
- Ryan Sullivan 7.09
- Eric Monaghan 6.72
- Ian Barney 4.57
- Jason Gage 4.51
- Scott Nicholls 3.35
- Darren Shand 3.15

Sheffield

- Roman Matoušek 8.22
- George Štancl 7.65
- Alan Mogridge 6.86
- Shawn Moran 6.35
- Greg Bartlett 5.94
- Rod Colquhoun 5.36
- Robbie Kessler 5.00
- Rob Woffinden 5.00
- Shawn Venables 4.26
- Steve Knott 4.13
- Louis Carr 3.57

Swindon

- Tony Olsson 10.07
- Tony Langdon 8.05
- David Blackburn 6.81
- Gary Chessell 6.63
- Patrik Olsson 6.44
- Glenn Cunningham.5.53
- John Jefferies 1.96

== See also ==
- List of United Kingdom Speedway League Champions
- Knockout Cup (speedway)
