= 1995 Australian Individual Speedway Championship =

Australian motorcycle speedway championship

Seasons
- ← 1994 1996 →

The 1995 Australian Individual Speedway Championship was held at the Gosford Speedway in Gosford, New South Wales on 27 January 1995.

Jason Crump won his first Australian Championship, joining his father Phil Crump to be the only father/son combination to win the Australian Championship. The 1991 champion Craig Boyce finished second following a runoff with triple defending champion Leigh Adams, after both finished on 13 points. Jason Lyons finished in fourth place while dual South Australian Champion Shane Parker defeated Stephen Davies in a runoff to claim the final available place in the Overseas final.

== Final ==
- Australian Championship
- 27 January 1995
- (New South Wales) Gosford Speedway, Gosford
- Qualification: The top five riders go through to the Overseas Final in Coventry, England.

Pos.	Rider	Points	Details
Gold	Jason Crump ( (Queensland) )	14	
Silver	Craig Boyce ( (New South Wales) )	13+3	
Bronze	Leigh Adams ( (Victoria (state)) )	13+2	
4	Jason Lyons ( (Victoria (state)) )	12	
5	Shane Parker ( (South Australia) )	10+3	
6	Stephen Davies ( (New South Wales) )	10+2	
7	Chris Watson ( (New South Wales) )	9	
8	Ryan Sullivan ( (South Australia) )	8	
9	Steve Johnston ( (Western Australia) )	7	
10	Mick Poole ( (New South Wales) )	6	
11	Glenn Doyle ( (Western Australia) )	6	
12	Mark Lemon ( (Victoria (state)) )	4	
13	Shane Bowes ( (South Australia) )	3	
14	Tony Langdon ( (Queensland) )	2	
15	Cory Alderton ( (Victoria (state)) )	2	
16	Greg Bartlett ( (New South Wales) )	1	
17	Craig Watson ( (New South Wales) ) (Res)	0	

== See also ==
- Australia national speedway team
- Sport in Australia
