= 1994 Australian Individual Speedway Championship =

Australian motorcycle speedway championship

Seasons
- ← 1993 1995 →

The 1994 Australian Individual Speedway Championship was held at the Olympic Park Speedway in Mildura, Victoria on 22 January 1994.

Two time defending champion Leigh Adams won his third straight Australian Championship and his first with a 15-point maximum. Jason Lyons finished second for the second straight year while Jason Crump, the son of dour time Australian Champion Phil Crump finished third making it an all-Mildura rider podium.

== Final ==
- 22 January 1994
- (Victoria (state)) Olympic Park Speedway, Mildura
- Qualification: The top four riders plus one reserve go through to the Commonwealth final in King's Lynn, England.

Pos.	Rider	Total
1	(Victoria (state)) Leigh Adams	15
2	(Victoria (state)) Jason Lyons	13
3	(Victoria (state)) Jason Crump	11
4	(New South Wales) Craig Boyce	11
5	(South Australia) Shane Parker	10
6	(New South Wales) Mick Poole	9
7	(Queensland) Tony Langdon	9
8	(Victoria (state)) Cory Alderton	9
9	(Victoria (state)) Mark Lemon	8
10	(Queensland) Troy Butler	7
11	(New South Wales) Stephen Davies	5
12	(South Australia) Brett Woodfield	4
13	(Queensland) Tony Rose	4
14	(Western Australia) Steve Johnston	2
15	(Northern Territory) Wayne Lorimer	1
16	(Northern Territory) Greg Barlett	1

== See also ==
- Australia national speedway team
- Sport in Australia
