= 1992 British League Division Two season =

British motorcycle speedway tier 2 league season

- League: British League Division Two
- No. of competitors: 11
- Champions: Peterborough Panthers
- Knockout Cup: Peterborough Panthers
- Gold Cup: Newcastle Diamonds
- Fours: Peterborough Panthers
- Individual: Róbert Nagy
- Highest average: Richard Knight
- Division/s above: British League (Div 1)

The 1992 British League Division Two season was contested as the second division of Speedway in the United Kingdom.

== Summary ==
Berwick dropped down from division 1 but the league lost two teams with Mildenhall Fen Tigers and Milton Keynes Knights both withdrawing from the league in June and their results were expunged. Mildenhall however did complete their Gold Cup fixtures. The BSPA withdrew the Milton Keynes speedway licence following complaints over the state of the track and several days later on 24 June, the club was wound-up.

The title was won by the Peterborough Panthers.

The season had a sad end when on 13 September Wayne Garratt crashed riding for Newcastle Diamonds against Peterborough. He suffered a brain injury and was placed on a life support machine but died 15 days later.

== Final table ==
Pos	Team	PL	W	D	L	BP	Pts
1	Peterborough Panthers	20	14	0	6	7½	35½
2	Berwick Bandits	20	12	1	7	7	32
3	Glasgow Tigers	19	11	0	8	7½	30½
4	Newcastle Diamonds	20	11	0	9	7	29
5	Rye House Rockets	19	12	0	7	4	29
6	Exeter Falcons	20	9	0	11	4	22
7	Edinburgh Monarchs	20	8	0	12	5	21
8	Stoke Potters	20	8	0	12	5	21
9	Long Eaton Invaders	20	7	2	11	4	20
10	Sheffield Tigers	20	9	1	10	1	20
11	Middlesbrough Bears	20	6	0	14	2	13

=== Fixtures and results ===
Home \ Away	BER	ED	EX	GLA	LE	MID	NEW	PET	RH	SHE	STO
Berwick		49–40	60–30	50–40	54–36	58–32	46–43	55–35	52–38	66–24	60–30
Edinburgh	38–52		55–34	47–43	54–36	57–33	48–42	60–30	43–46	60–30	46–44
Exeter	47–43	58–32		43–47	59–30	54–36	62–28	41–49	56–33	63–27	61–29
Glasgow	51–39	41–49	65–25		56–34	54–36	50–40	54–36	39.5–26.5	58–32	51–38
Long Eaton	45–45	47–43	44–46	50–40		55–35	49–41	36–54	63–27	68–21	59–31
Middlesbrough	43–46	48–41	55–34	55–35	50–39		45–44	43–47	37–53	43–46	48–41
Newcastle	51–38	47–43	65–25	47–43	56–33	49–41		56–34	57–33	58–32	50–39
Peterborough	60–30	56–34	56–34	54–36	54–36	55–34	57–32		50–40	49–41	62–28
Rye House	46–44	53–37	55–35	47–43	50–39	52–35	48–41	62–28		59–31	51–39
Sheffield	56–34	53–37	51–38	46–44	45–45	63–27	52–38	44–46	58–32		51–37
Stoke	47–43	50–40	65–25	42–47	54–34	53–37	43–47	56–34	57–33	56–34	

Legend: Blue = home team win; Yellow = draw; Red = away team win.

== British League Division Two Knockout Cup ==
The 1992 British League Division Two Knockout Cup was the 25th edition of the Knockout Cup for tier two teams. Peterborough Panthers were the winners of the competition.

First round

Date	Team one	Score	Team two
28/06	Glasgow	39-51	Edinburgh
15/08	Stoke	59-31	Exeter
29/06	Exeter	58-32	Stoke
27/05	Long Eaton	49-41	Peterborough
25/05	Peterborough	57-33	Long Eaton
08/05	Edinburgh	58-32	Glasgow

Quarter-finals

Date	Team one	Score	Team two
31/08	Berwick	52-38	Stoke
31/08	Peterborough	58-32	Edinburgh
29/08	Stoke	49-41	Berwick
14/08	Edinburgh	50-40	Peterborough
31/05	Newcastle	53-36	Middlesbrough
28/05	Middlesbrough	46-43	Newcastle

Semi-finals

Date	Team one	Score	Team two
10/10	Berwick	53-37	Rye House
27/09	Rye House	60-28	Berwick
13/09	Newcastle	49-41	Peterborough
11/09	Peterborough	49-41	Newcastle
09/10 replay	Peterborough	51-39	Newcastle
04/10 replay	Newcastle	44-46	Peterborough

Final

First leg

23 October 1992

Peterborough Panthers Jason Crump 13 Mick Poole 10 Paul Hurry 9 Neville Tatum 8 Stephen Davies 8 Rod Colquhoun 8 Mark Blackbird 4	60 – 30	Rye House Rockets Jens Rasmussen 12 Martin Goodwin 8 Mark Courtney 4 Robert Ledwith 3 Mikael Teurnberg 2 Jan Pedersen 1 Sean Courtney 0

East of England Showground

Second leg

28 October 1992

Rye House Rockets Mikael Teurnberg 16 Martin Goodwin 11 Jens Rasmussen 8 Sean Courtney 6 Jan Pedersen 6 Mark Courtney 3 Robert Ledwith 1	51 – 39	Peterborough Panthers Mick Poole 9 Neville Tatum 9 Stephen Davies 7 Jason Crump 6 Paul Hurry 5 Rod Colquhoun 3 Mark Blackbird 0

Arena Essex Raceway

Peterborough were declared Knockout Cup Champions, winning on aggregate 99–81.

== Gold Cup ==
North Group

Pos	Team	P	W	D	L	Pts
1	Newcastle	10	8	1	1	17
2	Berwick	10	6	0	4	12
3	Sheffield	10	5	0	5	10
4	Middlesbrough	10	4	0	6	8
5	Edinburgh	10	3	1	6	7
6	Glasgow	10	3	0	7	6

South Group

Pos	Team	P	W	D	L	Pts
1	Stoke	12	8	0	4	16
2	Exeter	12	7	0	5	14
3	Peterborough	12	7	0	5	14
4	Mildenhall	11	6	0	5	12
5	Long Eaton	11	5	0	6	10
6	Rye House	11	5	0	6	10
6	Milton Keynes	9	1	0	8	2

Home \ Away	BER	ED	GLA	MID	NEW	SHE
Berwick		58–32	64–26	59–31	36–54	59–31
Edinburgh	42–48		56–33	55–35	45–45	62–28
Glasgow	44–46	46–43		51–39	42–48	48–42
Middlesbrough	50–40	57–33	52–38		43–47	55–35
Newcastle	46–43	50–40	54–36	58–32		54–36
Sheffield	51–39	52–38	48–41	46–44	48–42	

Legend: Blue = home team win; Yellow = draw; Red = away team win.

Home \ Away	EX	LE	MIL	MK	PET	RH	STO
Exeter		62–28	71–19	63–27	54–36	53–37	66–23
Long Eaton	42–48		51–39	51–39	51–39	48–42	49–41
Mildenhall	48–42	47–43		49–41	42–48	49–41	39–51
Milton Keynes	46–43	–	–		41–49	–	40–49
Peterborough	52–38	53–37	43–47	60–30		59–31	49–41
Rye House	51–39	46–44	35–53	53–35	49–41		46–42
Stoke	53–37	54–36	48–42	56–34	60–29	48–42	

Legend: Blue = home team win; Yellow = draw; Red = away team win.

Final

Team one	Team two	1st leg	2nd leg
Stoke	Newcastle	37–53	38—51

Newcastle won 104–75 on aggregate.

== Final leading averages ==
Rider	Team	Average
Richard Knight	Berwick	10.32
David Bargh	Newcastle	9.89
Jan Stæchmann	Long Eaton	9.87
Neil Evitts	Sheffield	9.71
Martin Goodwin	Rye House	9.67
Peter Carr	Sheffield	9.47
Mark Thorpe	Newcastle	9.30
Tony Langdon	Sheffield	9.21
Steve Regeling	Middlesbrough	9.12
Shane Bowes	Glasgow	8.96

== Riders' Championship ==
Róbert Nagy won the Riders' Championship. The final sponsored by Jawa Moto & Barum was held on 19 September at Brandon Stadium.

Pos.	Rider	Pts	Total
1	(Hungary) Róbert Nagy	3 2 2 3 3	13
2	(Australia) Mick Poole	2 2 3 3 3	13
3	(England) Richard Green	3 3 3 2 fex	11
4	(England) Martin Goodwin	f 3 2 3 2	10
5	(Australia) Tony Langdon	3 2 0 1 2	8
6	(Denmark) Jan Staechmann	fex 1 3 1 3	8
7	(New Zealand) David Bargh	2 r 1 2 3	8
8	(England) David Blackburn	3 3 r 0 2	8
9	(Australia) Shane Bowes	f 1 3 2 2	8
10	(England) Andy Grahame	1 2 2 1 1	7
11	(Scotland) Kenny McKinna	2 0 1 3 1	7
12	(England) Richard Knight	0 3 1 2 fex	6
13	(England) Les Collins	2 1 0 1 1	5
14	(New Zealand) Mark Thorpe	1 0 2 0 ef	3
15	(Australia) Steve Regeling	1 0 1 r 0	2
16	(England) Paul Whittaker	1 1 0 0 0	2

- f=fell, r-retired, ex=excluded, ef=engine failure t=touched tapes

== Fours ==
Peterborough Panthers won the fours championship final, held at the East of England Arena on 26 July.

Final

Pos	Team	Pts	Riders
1	Peterborough	24	Poole 9, Hurry
2	Edinburgh	23	Collins L 8, McKinna,
3	Rye House	17	Goodwin 6
4	Glasgow	8	Nagy 3, Powell 3, Bowes 0

== Riders & final averages ==
Berwick

- Richard Knight 10.32
- David Walsh 8.38
- David Blackburn 8.07
- Scott Lamb 6.68
- Scott Robson 6.52
- Chris Readshaw 4.92
- Michael Lowrie 2.53

Edinburgh

- Les Collins 8.85
- Kenny McKinna 8.44
- Michael Coles 8.02
- Johnny Jorgensen 6.93
- Brett Saunders 6.68
- Dariusz Fliegert 4.90
- Jan Andersen 3.58 (5 matches only)
- Mike McLuskey 3.36
- Mike Lewthwaite 3.26
- John Wainwright 2.61

Exeter

- Richard Green 8.80
- Paul Fry 7.52
- Peter Jeffery 6.60
- Frank Smart 6.57
- Colin Cook 6.44
- Mark Simmonds 6.27
- Ian Humphreys 4.74
- Tommy Palmer 2.88

Glasgow

- Shane Bowes 8.96
- Robert Nagy 8.61
- Neil Collins 8.37
- Steve Lawson 7.90
- Mick Powell 5.62
- Jesper Olsen 4.78
- James Grieves 4.59
- Jason Straughan 2.92

Long Eaton

- Jan Stæchmann 9.87
- Carl Blackbird 8.03
- Richard Hellsen 7.07
- Deon Prinsloo 6.00
- Martin Dixon 5.84
- Gary O'Hare 5.41
- Nigel Sparshott 4.85

Middlesbrough

- Steve Regeling 9.12
- Daz Sumner 7.72
- David Cheshire 6.44
- Mark Lemon 5.78
- Paul Whittaker 5.26
- Doug Nicol 5.22
- Duncan Chapman 5.09
- Donny Odom 4.41
- Paul Pickering 2.96
- Stuart Swales 2.73

Mildenhall (withdrew from league)

- Nigel Leaver 8.61
- Melvyn Taylor 7.24
- Mikael Teurnberg 6.67
- David Smart 6.10
- Jamie Habbin 5.55
- Jesper Olsen 5.14
- Gary Tagg 4.29
- Jason Gage 3.64

Milton Keynes (withdrew from league)

- Peter Glanz 8.92
- Richard Hellsen 7.60
- David Steen 6.91
- Kieran McCullagh 6.00
- Frank Smart 4.40
- Justin Walker 3.43
- Ian Barney 2.86

Newcastle

- David Bargh 9.89
- Mark Thorpe 9.30
- Scott Norman 7.67
- Phil Jeffrey 6.42
- Richard Juul 5.49
- Wayne Garratt 4.63
- Max Schofield 4.61
- David Nagel 2.93

Peterborough

- Mick Poole 8.77
- Jason Crump 8.40
- Stephen Davies 8.16
- Rod Colquhoun 6.46
- Neville Tatum 6.44
- Mark Blackbird 5.93
- Paul Hurry 5.64

Rye House

- Martin Goodwin 9.67
- Jens Rasmussen 7.52
- Jan Pedersen 7.08
- Mikael Teurnberg 6.51
- Sean Courtney 6.15
- Mark Courtney 5.89
- Robert Ledwith 4.83
- Chris Young 3.30

Sheffield

- Neil Evitts 9.71
- Peter Carr 9.47
- Tony Langdon 9.21
- Louis Carr 5.64
- Simon Green 4.40
- Steve Johnston 3.96
- Mark Hepworth 3.73
- Steve Knott 3.71

Stoke

- Nigel Crabtree 8.66
- Alan Grahame 8.36
- Eric Monaghan 7.61
- Gary Chessell 6.67
- Garry Stead 5.68
- David Steen 5.68
- Andy Meredith 3.46
- Darren Standing 2.18

== See also ==
- List of United Kingdom Speedway League Champions
- Knockout Cup (speedway)
