= 1992 Australian Individual Speedway Championship =

Australian motorcycle speedway championship

Seasons
- ← 1991 1993 →

The 1992 Australian Individual Speedway Championship was the 1992 version of the Australian Individual Speedway Championship organised by Motorcycling Australia. The final took place on 26 January 1992 at the North Arm Speedway in Adelaide, South Australia.

The championship was won by Mildura's Leigh Adams who won the first of his record 10 national championships. Shane Parker from Adelaide was second (and the only rider who defeated Adams on the night) with Queensland's Mark Carlson in third place. Jason Lyons, also from Mildura defeated former champion Glenn Doyle and Queensland's Tony Langdon in a run-off for fourth place to grab the last Australian qualifying spot in the 1992 Commonwealth final in England.

Leigh Adams became the first rider to complete the Australian Championship 'treble' having already won the Australian Under-16 Championship in 1986 and the Australian Under-21 Championship in 1988, 1989, 1991 and 1992. He also became the first rider to win the Under-21 and senior championships in the same season, a feat not repeated until Chris Holder from Sydney did so in 2008. Adams would go on to win the 1992 Under-21 Speedway World Championship later in the year in Germany.

During Heat 3 of the meeting, Todd Wiltshire from New South Wales, who had placed 3rd in the 1990 World Final in England, fell in the second last turn after a race long battle for the lead with Victorian Jason Lyons. As Lyons dived under him for the lead, Wiltshire fell and along with his bike crashed into the safety fence, suffering terrible back injuries and multiple fractures of the Pelvis. Thankfully his Spinal Cord was not damaged, however the injuries were bad enough that the 23-year-old Wiltshire decided to retire from racing, though he would make a comeback to the sport in 1997.

== Final ==
- Australian Championship
- 26 January 1992
- (South Australia) North Arm Speedway, Adelaide
- Attendance - 6,000 (capacity)
- Referee: Sam Bass
- Qualification: The top four riders go through to the Commonwealth final in England.

Pos.	Rider	Points	Details
Gold	Leigh Adams ( (Victoria (state)) )	14	(3,2,3,3,3)
Silver	Shane Parker ( (South Australia) )	13	(2,3,3,3,2)
Bronze	Mark Carlson ( (Queensland) )	11	(2,2,2,2,3)
4	Jason Lyons ( (Victoria (state)) )	10+3	(3,0,3,2,2+3)
5	Glenn Doyle ( (Western Australia) )	10+2	(3,3,1,2,1+2)
6	Tony Langdon ( (Queensland) )	10+1	(1,2,1,3,3+1)
7	Craig Hodgson ( (South Australia) )	8	(3,1,t,1,3)
8	Craig Boyce ( (New South Wales) )	8	(2,3,2,0,1)
9	Mick Poole ( (New South Wales) )	8	(1,3,1,1,2)
10	David Cheshire ( (Western Australia) )	7	(1,1,3,2,0)
11	Rod Colquhoun ( (New South Wales) )	6	(0,1,0,3,2)
12	Troy Butler ( (Queensland) )	6	(0,2,2,1,1)
13	Michael Carter ( (Western Australia) )	5	(2,0,2,1,0)
14	Glen Baxter ( (Northern Territory) )	2	(1,0,0,0,1)
15	Steve Greatz ( (South Australia) ) (Res)	1	(-,1,0,-,0)
16	Paul Schevienen ( (South Australia) ) (Res)	1	(-,-,1,0,-)
17	Kelvin Willis ( (Northern Territory) )	0	(0,0,0,0,0)
18	Todd Wiltshire ( (New South Wales) )	0	(f,-,-,-,-)

=== Classification ===
Placing	Rider	Total	1	2	3	4	5	6	7	8	9	10	11	12	13	14	15	16	17	18	19	20	Pts	Pos
1	(Victoria (state)) (5) Leigh Adams	14		3			2					3					3					3	14	1
2	(South Australia) (13) Shane Parker	13				2	3							3		3					2		13	2
3	(Queensland) (2) Mark Carlson	11	2					2				2				2				3			11	3
4	(Victoria (state)) (9) Jason Lyons	10+3			3		0						3					2		2			10	4
5	(Western Australia) (14) Glenn Doyle	10+2				3		3					1		2							1	10	5
6	(Queensland) (12) Tony Langdon	10+1			1					2		1			3						3		10	6
7	(South Australia) (1) Craig Hodgson	8	3				1				t				1				3				8	7
8	(New South Wales) (7) Craig Boyce	8		2					3					2	0					1			8	8
9	(New South Wales) (4) Mick Poole	8	1							3				1				1				2	8	9
10	(Western Australia) (16) David Cheshire	7				1				1	3						2			0			7	10
11	(New South Wales) (15) Rod Colquhoun	6				0			1			0						3	2				6	11
12	(Queensland) (3) Troy Butler	6	0						2				2				1				1		6	12
13	(Western Australia) (11) Michael Carter	5			2				0		2					1						0	5	13
14	(Northern Territory) (8) Glen Baxter	2		1						0			0			0			1				2	14
15	(Northern Territory) (6) Kelvin Willis	0		0				0			0							0			0		0	15
16	(New South Wales) (10) Todd Wiltshire	0			f			ns						ns			ns		ns				0	16
Res	(South Australia) (17) Steve Greatz	1						1						0					0				1	Res
Res	(South Australia) (18) Paul Schevienen	1									1						0						1	Res
Placing	Rider	Total	1	2	3	4	5	6	7	8	9	10	11	12	13	14	15	16	17	18	19	20	Pts	Pos

m - exclusion for exceeding two minute time allowance • t - exclusion for touching the tapes • x - other exclusion • e - retired or mechanical failure • f - fell • ns - non-starter • nc - non-classify

gate A - inside	gate B	gate C	gate D - outside

== See also ==
- Australia national speedway team
- Sport in Australia
