= 1997 Australian Individual Speedway Championship =

Australian motorcycle speedway championship

Seasons
- ← 1996 1998 →

The 1997 Australian Individual Speedway Championship was held at the Brisbane Exhibition Ground in Brisbane, Queensland on 28 December 1996. This was the final time (as of 2014) that the "Ekka" has hosted an Australian Solo Championship.

Defending champion Craig Boyce won his third and final Australian Championship, once again scoring a 15-point maximum from his five rides. Jason Crump finished second for the second straight year after defeating South Australian Champion Ryan Sullivan and former three time national champion Leigh Adams in a runoff when all three riders finished on 13 points.

== Final ==
- Australian Championship
- 28 December 1996
- (Queensland) Brisbane Exhibition Ground
- Qualification: The top four riders go through to the Overseas Final in Bradford, England.

Pos.	Rider	Points	Details
Gold	Craig Boyce ( (New South Wales) )	15	
Silver	Jason Crump ( (Queensland) )	13+3	
Bronze	Ryan Sullivan ( (South Australia) )	13+2	
4	Leigh Adams ( (Victoria (state)) )	13+1	
5	Craig Watson ( (New South Wales) )	10	
6	Shane Parker ( (South Australia) )	10	
7	Jason Lyons ( (Victoria (state)) )	8	
8	Stephen Davies ( (New South Wales) )	7	
9	Mark Lemon ( (Victoria (state)) )	7	
10	Mick Poole ( (New South Wales) )	6	
11	Tony Rose ( (Australia) )	5	
12	Mark Keast ( (Australia) )	5	
13	Brett Woodifield ( (South Australia) )	3	
14	Lee Redmond ( (New South Wales) )	2	
15	Jason Stewart ( (Australia) )	1	
16	Brent Collyer ( (Queensland) ) (Res)	1	
16	Matt Johnson ( (Australia) )	0	

== See also ==
- Australia national speedway team
- Sport in Australia
