= 1993 Australian Individual Speedway Championship =

Australian motorcycle speedway championship

Seasons
- ← 1992 1994 →

The 1993 Australian Individual Speedway Championship was held at the Brisbane Exhibition Ground in Brisbane, Queensland on 30 January 1993.

Defending champion Leigh Adams won his second straight Australian Championship. Fellow Mildura rider Jason Lyons finished second with Adelaide's Shane Bowes finishing third. Another Adelaide rider (though riding under the Western Australian flag) Craig Hodgson defeated Queensland champion Troy Butler to claim fourth place.

== Final ==
- 30 January 1993
- (Queensland) Brisbane Exhibition Ground, Brisbane
- Qualification: The top four riders plus one reserve go through to the Commonwealth final in King's Lynn, England.

| Pos. | Rider | Total |
|---|---|---|
| 1 | (Victoria (state)) Leigh Adams | 14 (2,3,3,3,3) |
| 2 | (Victoria (state)) Jason Lyons | 12 (3,2,2,2,3) |
| 3 | (South Australia) Shane Bowes | 11 (1,3,3,3,1) |
| 4 | (South Australia) Craig Hodgson | 10+3 (3,2,x,3,2+3) |
| 5 | (Queensland) Troy Butler | 10+2 (nf,3,3,2,2+2) |
| 6 | (New South Wales) Craig Boyce | 9 (1,2,3,e,3) |
| 7 | (New South Wales) Mick Poole | 9 (1,2,2,3,1) |
| 8 | (New South Wales) Stephen Davies | 6 (1,3,2,f,-) |
| 9 | (Queensland) Tony Langdon | 6 (0,0,2,1,3) |
| 10 | (Queensland) Mark Carlson | 6 (3,1,1,0,1) |
| 11 | (South Australia) Scott Norman | 5 (3,0,1,1,0) |
| 12 | (Western Australia) Glenn Doyle | 5 (2,1,0,2,0) |
| 13 | (Victoria (state)) Mark Lemon | 5 (0,1,1,1,2) |
| 14 | (Northern Territory) Glen Baxter | 5 (0,1,1,2,1) |
| 15 | (South Australia) Shane Parker | 4 (2,0,0,0,2) |
| 16 | (Northern Territory) Wayne Bridgeford | 3 (2,0,0,1,0) |
| R1 | (Queensland) Clinton Butler | 0 (-,-,0,-,-) |
| R2 | (Queensland) Mick Powell | 0 (-,-,-,-,0) |

=== Classification ===
| Placing | Rider | Total | 1 | 2 | 3 | 4 | 5 | 6 | 7 | 8 | 9 | 10 | 11 | 12 | 13 | 14 | 15 | 16 | 17 | 18 | 19 | 20 | Pts | Pos |
|---|---|---|---|---|---|---|---|---|---|---|---|---|---|---|---|---|---|---|---|---|---|---|---|---|
| 1 | (Victoria (state)) (5) Leigh Adams | 14 | | 2 | | | 3 | | | | | 3 | | | | | 3 | | | | | 3 | 14 | 1 |
| 2 | (Victoria (state)) (13) Jason Lyons | 11 | | | | 3 | 2 | | | | | | | 2 | | 2 | | | | | 3 | | 12 | 2 |
| 3 | (South Australia) (14) Shane Bowes | 11 | | | | 1 | | 3 | | | | | 3 | | 3 | | | | | | | 1 | 11 | 3 |
| 4 | (Western Australia) (4) Craig Hodgson | 10+3 | 3 | | | | | | | 2 | | | | t | | | | 3 | | | | 2 | 10 | 4 |
| 5 | (Queensland) (16) Troy Butler | 10+2 | | | | 0 | | | | 3 | 3 | | | | | | 2 | | | 2 | | | 10 | 5 |
| 6 | (New South Wales) (6) Craig Boyce | 9 | | 1 | | | | 2 | | | 3 | | | | | | | 0 | | | 3 | | 9 | 6 |
| 7 | (New South Wales) (2) Mick Poole | 9 | 1 | | | | | 2 | | | | 2 | | | | 3 | | | | 1 | | | 9 | 7 |
| 8 | (New South Wales) (10) Stephen Davies | 6 | | | 1 | | | 3 | | | | | | 2 | | | f | | ns | | | | 6 | 8 |
| 9 | (Queensland) (8) Tony Langdon | 6 | | 0 | | | | | | 0 | | | 2 | | | 1 | | | 3 | | | | 6 | 9 |
| 10 | (Queensland) (9) Mark Carlson | 6 | | | 3 | | 1 | | | | | | 1 | | | | | 0 | | 1 | | | 6 | 10 |
| 11 | (South Australia) (7) Scott Norman | 5 | | 3 | | | | | 0 | | | | | 1 | 1 | | | | | 0 | | | 5 | 11 |
| 12 | (Western Australia) (11) Glenn Doyle | 5 | | | 2 | | | | 1 | | 0 | | | | | 2 | | | | | | 0 | 5 | 12 |
| 13 | (Victoria (state)) (3) Mark Lemon | 5 | 0 | | | | | | 1 | | | | 1 | | | | 1 | | | | 2 | | 5 | 13 |
| 14 | (Northern Territory) (12) Glen Baxter | 5 | | | 0 | | | | | 1 | | 1 | | | 2 | | | | | | 1 | | 5 | 14 |
| 15 | (South Australia) (15) Shane Parker | 4 | | | | 2 | | | 0 | | | 0 | | | | | | 0 | 2 | | | | 4 | 15 |
| 16 | (Northern Territory) (1) Wayne Bridgeford | 0 | 0 | | | | 0 | | | | 0 | | | | 0 | | | | 0 | | | | 0 | 16 |
| Res | (Queensland) (17) Clinton Butler | 0 | | | | | | | | | | | | 0 | | | | | | | | | 0 | Res |
| Res | (Queensland) (18) Mick Powell | 0 | | | | | | | | | | | | | | | | | 0 | | | | 0 | Res |
| Placing | Rider | Total | 1 | 2 | 3 | 4 | 5 | 6 | 7 | 8 | 9 | 10 | 11 | 12 | 13 | 14 | 15 | 16 | 17 | 18 | 19 | 20 | Pts | Pos |

m - exclusion for exceeding two minute time allowance • t - exclusion for touching the tapes • x - other exclusion • e - retired or mechanical failure • f - fell • ns - non-starter • nc - non-classify

| gate A - inside | gate B | gate C | gate D - outside |

== See also ==
- Australia national speedway team
- Sport in Australia
