= 1988 National League season =

British motorcycle speedway season

- League: National League
- No. of competitors: 16
- Champions: Hackney Kestrels
- Knockout Cup: Hackney Kestrels
- Individual: Troy Butler
- Pairs: Stoke Potters
- Fours: Peterborough Panthers
- Highest average: Mark Loram
- Division/s above: 1988 British League

In 1988 the National League, also known as British League Division Two, was the second tier of speedway racing in the United Kingdom.

== Summary ==
Glasgow Tigers returned to Glasgow for the first time in 15 years, when they moved into Shawfield Stadium in Rutherglen. The Canterbury Crusaders had been disbanded following the end of their lease at Kingsmead Stadium.

The league champions that year were Hackney Kestrels.

== Final table ==
Pos	Team	PL	W	D	L	Pts
1	Hackney Kestrels	30	26	2	2	54
2	Poole Pirates	30	20	1	9	41
3	Eastbourne Eagles	30	17	2	11	36
4	Wimbledon Dons	30	17	2	11	36
5	Berwick Bandits	30	17	2	11	36
6	Milton Keynes Knights	30	17	2	11	36
7	Stoke Potters	30	16	0	14	32
8	Peterborough Panthers	30	15	1	14	31
9	Arena Essex Hammers	30	15	1	14	31
10	Glasgow Tigers	30	13	2	15	28
11	Edinburgh Monarchs	30	14	0	16	28
12	Exeter Falcons	30	12	0	18	24
13	Mildenhall Fen Tigers	30	10	1	19	21
14	Rye House Rockets	30	8	1	21	17
15	Middlesbrough Tigers	30	7	1	22	15
16	Long Eaton Invaders	30	7	0	23	14

== Fixtures and results ==
Home \ Away	AE	BER	EAS	ED	EX	GLA	HAC	LE	MID	MIL	MK	PET	PP	RH	STO	WIM
Arena Essex		49–47	48–48	53–41	73–22	53–43	45–51	65–31	53–42	55–40	54–42	59–37	50–46	51–45	54–42	57–38
Berwick	60–36		52–44	51–45	65–30	54–42	48–48	60–36	59–37	56–40	67–29	55–41	48–47	68–28	56–40	56–40
Eastbourne	58–38	64–32		60–36	67–29	57–38	41–55	66–30	51–45	58–36	62–34	52–44	56–40	60–34	60–35	48–48
Edinburgh	50–46	46–50	47–49		60–36	53–43	40–56	62–34	56–40	61–35	51–45	52–44	51–45	55–41	49–47	48–47
Exeter	52–44	62–34	49–47	49–47		57–39	47–49	59–37	62–34	32–64	57–39	52–44	50–45	52–44	54–42	40–56
Glasgow	63–33	48–48	50–46	51–44	65–31		46–50	63–33	54–42	48–48	63–33	50–46	38–57	58–38	51–45	46–49
Hackney	58–38	59–37	50–44	60–36	68–28	60–36		73–23	50–46	69–27	74–22	55–41	60–36	62–34	58–38	58–36
Long Eaton	46–50	50–45	51–45	50–45	49–47	47–49	44–52		42–54	62–34	39–57	46–50	40–56	36–60	49–47	49–47
Middlesbrough	55–41	46–48	46–49	46–50	61–35	47–49	41–55	56–40		55–41	46–50	47–49	47–48	50–46	50–46	43–53
Mildenhall	52.5–43.5	58–38	45–51	58–37	63–33	57–39	47–49	63–33	53–43		46–50	46–50	45–51	56–40	47–48	44–51
Milton Keynes	45–51	49–47	51–45	51–44	63–33	49–44	46–50	55–40	60–35	73–23		50–46	51–44	60–36	54–42	55–39
Peterborough	60–18	65–31	57–39	73–23	61–35	59–37	46–50	68–28	56–40	49–47	48–48		46–50	67–29	59–36	62–34
Poole	66–30	60–36	50.5–45.5	52–44	64–32	62–34	49–47	62–34	65–31	47–49	48–48	52–44		60–36	52–44	49–46
Rye House	50–46	42–53	47–48	37–58	61–34	44–52	33–61	55–41	48–48	49–47	39–55	51–44	47–49		50–45	51–45
Stoke	59–37	55–41	52–43	59–37	67–29	60–36	49–47	64–32	54–42	55–41	69–27	50–46	61–35	63–33		55–41
Wimbledon	55–41	49–46	53–43	60–36	70–26	58–37	48–48	60–36	59–37	62–34	59–37	52–44	46–50	64–32	66–30	

Legend: Blue = home team win; Yellow = draw; Red = away team win.

== National League Knockout Cup ==
The 1988 National League Knockout Cup was the 21st edition of the Knockout Cup for tier two teams. Hackney Kestrels were the winners of the competition.

First round

Team one	Team two	1st leg	2nd leg
Edinburgh	Stoke	55–41	45–50
Berwick	Glasgow	56–40	49–47
Hackney	Poole	70–26	40–56
Peterborough	Rye House	58–38	39–56
Arena Essex	Mildenhall	54–42	39–57
Eastbourne	Exeter	66–29	50–46
Milton Keynes	Wimbledon	44–52	41–55
Long Eaton	Middlesbrough	51–45	33–63

Quarter-finals

Team one	Team two	1st leg	2nd leg	replay	replay
Edinburgh	Peterborough	51–45	46–49		
Berwick	Eastbourne	56–40	45–51		
Mildenhall	Wimbledon	59–37	37–59	45–50	46–50
Hackney	Middlesbrough	56–40	51–45		

Semi-finals

Team one	Team two	1st leg	2nd leg
Berwick	Wimbledon	58–38	33–63
Edinburgh	Hackney	45–51	25–71

Final

First leg

7 October 1988

Hackney Kestrels	60 – 36	Wimbledon Dons

Hackney Wick Stadium

Second leg

19 October 1988

Wimbledon Dons	46 – 50	Hackney Kestrels

Wimbledon Stadium

Hackney were declared Knockout Cup Champions, winning on aggregate 110–82.

== Riders' Championship ==
Troy Butler won the Riders' Championship. The final sponsored by Jawa Moto & Barum was held on 10 September 1988 at Brandon Stadium.

Pos.	Rider	Pts	Total
1	(Australia) Troy Butler	3 3 3 3 3	15
2	(England) Mark Loram	3 2 2 2 2	11+3
3	(Scotland) Kenny McKinna	3 1 2 2 3	11+2
4	(England) Melvyn Taylor	2 3 3 2 ef	10
5	(England) Graham Jones	1 3 0 3 3	10
6	(England) Kevin Jolly	0 2 3 3 1	9
7	(England) Steve Schofield	3 3 0 1 2	9
8	(England) Gordon Kennett	2 1 2 2 1	8
9	(England) Ian Barney	2 1 1 0 2	6
10	(Australia) Mark Fiora	1 0 3 0 3	7
11	(Australia) Steve Regeling	2 2 1 1 0	6
12	(England) Martin Goodwin	1 0 1 1 2	5
13	(Denmark) Jens Rasmussen	0 2 2 ef 1	5
14	(England) Jamie Luckhurst	0 0 1 3 r	4
15	(England) Keith White	1 0 0 1 1	3
16	(England) Mark Courtney	0 1 0 0 x	1
17	(England) Mike Bacon (res)	ef	0

- f=fell, r-retired, ex=excluded, ef=engine failure t=touched tapes

== Pairs ==
The National League Pairs was held at Wimborne Road was due to be held on 24 July but was postponed before being held on 23 August. The event was won by Stoke Potters.

Group A
Pos	Team	Pts	Riders
1	Stoke	18	Jones 9 Bastable 9
u	Hackney		
u	Middlesbrough		
u	Rye House		

Group B
Pos	Team	Pts	Riders
1	Peterborough		Poole
u	Mildenhall		Taylor; Monaghan
u	Milton Keynes		Butler; Baldwin
u	Arena Essex		

Group C
Pos	Team	Pts	Riders
1	Eastbourne		Kennett
2	Berwick		Courtney; Grant
3			
4			

Group D
Pos	Team	Pts	Riders
1	Poole		Schofield; Biles
2	Edinburgh		
3	Glasgow		
4			

Semi finals

- Stoke bt Eastbourne 5-4
- Poole bt Peterborough 5-4

Final

- Stoke bt Poole 7-2

== Fours ==
Peterborough Panthers won the fours championship final, held at the East of England Arena on 7 August.

Semi finals

- SF1 = Poole 20, Peterborough 18, Stoke 9, Glasgow 1
- SF2 = Mildenhall 15, Eastbourne 12, Middlesbrough 11, Hackney 10

Final

Pos	Team	Pts	Riders
1	Peterborough Panthers	14	Hodgson 5, Poole 4, Hawkins 4, Barney 1
2	Mildenhall Fen Tigers	13	Hines 4, Taylor 4, Monaghan 3, Baxter 1
3	Eastbourne Eagles	13	Buck 6, Standing 4, Barker 3, Kennett 0
4	Poole Pirates	8	Biles 4, Smart 2, Boyce 2, Schofield 0

== Leading averages ==
Rider	Team	Average
Mark Loram	Hackney	10.34
Steve Schofield	Poole	10.22
Melvyn Taylor	Mildenhall	10.11
Mark Courtney	Berwick	10.07
Kenny McKinna	Glasgow	10.05
Gordon Kennett	Eastbourne	9.97
Andy Galvin	Hackney	9.86
Martin Goodwin	Arena Essex	9.68
Andy Buck	Eastbourne	9.56
Mick Poole	Peterborough	9.52
Mark Fiora	Middlesbrough	9.45

== Riders & final averages ==
Arena Essex

- Martin Goodwin 9.68
- David Smart 7.27
- Rob Tilbury 6.75
- Nigel Leaver 5.80
- Chris Cobby 5.71
- Ian Humphreys 4.76
- Simon Wolstenholme 4.61

Berwick

- Mark Courtney 10.07
- Charlie McKinna 8.40
- Steve McDermott 6.66
- Rob Grant Sr. 6.55
- Sean Courtney 6.12
- Phil Kynman 5.30
- Rob Woffinden 4.75
- Wayne Ross 4.61
- Ian Stead 4.56
- Scott Robson 2.15

Eastbourne

- Gordon Kennett 9.97
- Andy Buck 9.56
- Dean Standing 7.71
- Dean Barker 7.37
- Keith Pritchard 5.62
- David Norris 5.00
- Jon Surman 4.44
- Darren Standing 4.32

Edinburgh

- Les Collins 9.00
- Jamie Luckhurst 8.60
- Doug Wyer 7.27
- Brett Saunders 6.57
- Scott Lamb 4.69
- Rob Woffinden 4.59
- Jeremy Luckhurst 4.24
- Darrell Branford 2.86
- Mike Long 2.74

Exeter

- Steve Regeling 7.90
- Colin Cook 6.80
- Richard Green 6.46
- Alan Rivett 6.43
- Dave Trownson 6.16
- Peter Jeffery 5.53
- Andy Sell 5.32
- Rob Fortune 4.72
- Tony Mattingley 2.90
- Bruce Cribb 3.24

Glasgow

- Kenny McKinna 10.05
- Steve Lawson 8.69
- David Blackburn 7.33
- Phil Jeffrey 5.36
- Shane Bowes 5.01
- Martin McKinna 4.17
- Geoff Powell 3.73
- Wayne Ross 3.06
- Michael Irving 2.20

Hackney

- Mark Loram 10.34
- Andy Galvin 9.86
- Chris Louis 8.04
- Alan Mogridge 7.41
- Paul Whittaker 7.29
- Gary Rolls 5.94
- Barry Thomas 5.92

Long Eaton

- Keith White 8.40
- Glenn Doyle 7.83
- Mike Spink 6.20
- Gary O'Hare 5.44
- Richie Owen 4.00
- Darrell Branford 3.48
- Dave Morton 3.29
- Wayne Elliott 3.21
- Jon Roberts 2.92
- Steve Bishop 2.71

Middlesbrough

- Mark Fiora 9.45
- Daz Sumner 8.10
- Martin Dixon 8.00
- Peter McNamara 5.80
- Ashley Norton 4.56
- Nigel Sparshott 4.52
- Geoff Pusey 3.80
- Andy Sumner 3.74
- Andy Buck 3.04
- David Clay 2.86
- Max Schofield 2.38
- Paul Bentley 2.33

Mildenhall

- Melvyn Taylor 10.11
- Dave Jackson 7.74
- Andy Hines 7.08
- Eric Monaghan 6.62
- Glen Baxter 5.66
- Michael Coles 5.59
- Paul Blackbird 2.57
- Simon Green 2.56

Milton Keynes

- Troy Butler 8.72
- Alastair Stevens 7.67
- Carl Baldwin 7.51
- Trevor Banks 7.20
- Ian Clark 6.44
- Mark Carlson 6.10
- Tony Primmer 6.07
- Nigel Sparshott 5.61
- Paul Atkins 3.65

Peterborough

- Mick Poole 9.52
- Ian Barney 8.41
- Kevin Hawkins 7.98
- Craig Hodgson 7.81
- Jamie Habbin 5.72
- John Stokes 4.97
- Pete Chapman 4.55

Poole

- Steve Schofield 10.22
- David Biles 8.48
- Craig Boyce 7.65
- Kevin Smart 6.68
- Tony Langdon 6.67
- Gary Allan 5.58
- Robbie Fuller 4.98
- Nigel Flatman 4.90
- Steve Bishop 4.48
- Steve Langdon 3.50

Rye House

- Jens Rasmussen 9.28
- Paul Woods 8.12
- Steve Wilcock 6.27
- Mark Lyndon 5.59
- Kevin Brice 4.53
- Carl Chalcraft 4.50
- Peter Schroeck 3.46
- John Wainwright 2.67
- Kevin Teager 2.38

Stoke

- Nigel Crabtree 9.16
- Graham Jones 8.92
- Louis Carr 8.02
- Steve Bastable 6.96
- Derek Richardson 6.87
- Paul Fry 5.18
- Wayne Broadhurst 2.48
- Jon Hughes 2.08

Wimbledon

- Kevin Jolly 9.05
- Ray Morton 8.30
- Todd Wiltshire 7.66
- Roger Johns 7.29
- Alastair Stevens 7.20
- Andy Campbell 6.59
- Nathan Simpson 6.26
- Terry Mussett 4.73
- Rodney Payne 4.00

== See also ==
- List of United Kingdom Speedway League Champions
- Knockout Cup (speedway)
