= 1996 Australian Individual Speedway Championship =

Australian motorcycle speedway championship

Seasons
- ← 1995 1997 →

The 1996 Australian Individual Speedway Championship was held at the Newcastle Showgrounds in Newcastle, New South Wales on 17 February 1996. The Newcastle Showgrounds had last hosted an Australian Solo Championship in 1927 when it was a ½ mile track and not the modern, 400 metres (440 yards) version.

Sydney's Craig Boyce won his second national championship and his second with a 15-point maximum. Defending champion Jason Crump finished second after defeating Queensland's Tony Langdon in a runoff. Triple Australian Champion Leigh Adams and fellow Mildura rider Jason Lyons claimed the final two Overseas Final qualifying positions.

== Final ==
- Australian Championship
- 17 February 1996
- (New South Wales) Newcastle Showgrounds, Newcastle,
- Qualification: The top five riders go through to the Overseas final in Coventry, England.

Pos.	Rider	Points	Details
Gold	Craig Boyce ( (New South Wales) )	15	
Silver	Jason Crump ( (Queensland) )	13+3	
Bronze	Tony Langdon ( (Queensland) )	13+2	
4	Leigh Adams ( (Victoria (state)) )	10	
5	Jason Lyons ( (Victoria (state)) )	10	
6	Mark Lemon ( (Victoria (state)) )	9	
7	Ryan Sullivan ( (South Australia) )	8	
8	Mick Poole ( (New South Wales) )	8	
9	Chris Watson ( (New South Wales) )	8	
10	Shane Parker ( (South Australia) )	7	
11	Steve Johnston ( (Western Australia) )	6	
12	Wayne Baxter ( (Northern Territory) )	5	
13	Craig Watson ( (New South Wales) )	3	
14	Rod Heathcote ( (New South Wales) )	2	
15	Lee Redmond ( (New South Wales) )	2	
16	Brett Woodifield ( (South Australia) )	1	

== See also ==
- Australia national speedway team
- Sport in Australia
