= Australian Long Track Championship =

Motorcycle speedway championship in Australia

The Australian Long Track Championship is a Motorcycle speedway championship held annually in Australia to determine the Australian Long Track champion. The event is organised and sanctioned by Motorcycling Australia (MA). Where as motorcycle speedway takes place on tracks ranging from 250–400 metres in length, Long track racing generally takes place on 800 to 1000 metre long speedways.

Prior to 1947, the championship was known as the Australian 5 Mile Dirt Track Championship and was run from 1925 to 1927 with classes including 350cc, 500cc and Unlimited. The first championship was run on 11 April 1925 at Penrith in New South Wales and was won by Billy Conoulty.

The Australian Long Track Championship has run continuously since 1947 with a few exceptions. In recent years due to the lack of genuine Long track speedways in Australia, racing has generally taken place on ½ Mile or 1 Km long Harness Racing or Showground tracks in country towns.

== Winners since 1947 ==
Year	City/State	Winner
1947	Port Pirie, SA	Ray Trevena
1948	Port Pirie, SA	C. Jamieson
1949	Port Pirie, SA	Laurie Jamieson
Year	City/State	Winner
1950	Port Pirie, SA	G. Robertson
1951	Port Pirie, SA	G. Robertson
1952	Port Pirie, SA	A. Menzies
1953	Port Pirie, SA	A. Menzies
1954	Port Pirie, SA	Harry Denton
1955	Port Pirie, SA	D. Sheard
1956	Port Pirie, SA	Gerry Hussey ( (England) )
1957	Port Pirie, SA	Laurie Jamieson
1958	Port Pirie, SA	Laurie Jamieson
1959	Port Pirie, SA	Geoff Mudge
Year	City/State	Winner
1960	Port Pirie, SA	Laurie Jamieson
1961	Port Pirie, SA	Harry Denton
1962	Port Pirie, SA	Ivan Mauger ( (New Zealand) )
1963	Port Pirie, SA	Don Prettejon
1964	Port Pirie, SA	Jack Scott
1965	Port Pirie, SA	Jack Scott
1966	Port Pirie, SA	Jack Scott
1967-1968	Not Held	
1969	Romsey, Vic	Johny Dewhurst
Year	City/State	Winner
1970-1973	Not Held	
1974		Brenton Langlois
1975		
1976	Not Held	
1977	Morgan, SA	Brenton Langlois
1978		Rod Hunter
1979	Not Held	
Year	City/State	Winner
1980		Garry Chasemore
1981	Not Held	
1982	Morgan, SA	John Boulger
1983	Bendigo, Vic	Rod Hunter
1984-1987	Not Held	
1988		Mick Powell
1989	Port Pirie, SA	Chris Watson
Year	City/State	Winner
1990	Newcastle, NSW	Chris Watson
1991	Port Pirie, SA	Phil Crump
1992	Port Pirie, SA	Craig Hodgson
1993	Parramatta, NSW	Chris Watson
1994	Not Held	
1995	Bathurst, NSW	Chris Watson
1996	Port Pirie, SA	Jason Crump
1997	Muswellbrook, NSW	Craig Watson
1998	Port Pirie, SA	Craig Watson
1999	Port Pirie, SA	Leigh Adams
Year	City/State	Winner
2000	Bendigo, Vic	Chris Watson
2001	Toowoomba, Qld	Mick Poole
2002	Bathurst, NSW	Craig Watson
2003	Bathurst, NSW	Troy Batchelor
2004	Wagga Wagga, NSW	Troy Batchelor
2005	Bathurst, NSW	Chris Holder
2006	Wagga Wagga, NSW	Chris Holder
2007	Blaney, NSW	Richard Sweetman
2008	Brisbane, Qld	No Long Track Class
2009	Townsville, Qld	Daniel Mason
Year	City/State	Winner
2010	Tamworth, NSW	Todd Kurtz
2011	Tamworth, NSW	Todd Kurtz
2012	Tamworth, NSW	Kozza Smith
2013	Townsville, Qld	No Long Track Class
2014	Tamworth, NSW	Joey Ringwood

== See also ==
- Motorsport in Australia
- List of Australian motor racing series
