= 2003 Australian Individual Speedway Championship =

Australian motorcycle speedway championship

Seasons
- ← 2002 2004 →

The 2003 Australian Individual Speedway Championship was the 2003 version of the Australian Individual Speedway Championship organised by Motorcycling Australia. The final was held at the Gosford Speedway in Gosford, New South Wales and was the last time the championship was run under the single meeting format that had been in place since the first championship was run in 1926.

Defending champion Leigh Adams of Victoria was unbeaten over his 5 heats and the final, to win his 7th Australian senior championship, breaking the record of six wins by Billy Sanders. New South Wales riders Craig Watson, Todd Wiltshire and Mick Poole rounded out the top four point scorers to advance to the final. The final was won by Adams from Wiltshire, Watson and Poole.

== 2003 Australian Solo Championship ==
=== Intermediate Classification ===
- Australian Championship
- Gosford, New South Wales - Gosford Speedway
- Referee:

Pos.	Rider	Points	Details
1	Leigh Adams ( (Victoria (state)) )	15	(3,3,3,3,3)
2	Craig Watson ( (New South Wales) )	13	(3,3,2,3,2)
=3	Todd Wiltshire ( (New South Wales) )	12	(2,3,2,2,3)
=3	Mick Poole ( (New South Wales) )	12	(2,2,3,2,3)
5	Mark Lemon ( (Victoria (state)) )	10	(2,2,1,3,2)
6	John Jørgensen ( (Queensland) )	9	(1,Xf,3,3,2)
7	Scott Smith ( (Queensland) )	8	(3,2,0,ns,3)
8	Travis McGowan ( (Victoria (state)) )	7	(3,0,3,1,Xf)
=9	Christian Henry ( (Queensland) )	6	(0,3,2,0,1)
=9	Lee Herne ( (New South Wales) )	6	(1,1,1,1,2)
=9	Kevin Doolan ( (Victoria (state)) )	6	(1,2,1,1,1)
=12	Jason Stewart ( (Victoria (state)) )	5	(0,0,2,2,1)
=12	Rory Schlein ( (South Australia) )	5	(1,1,1,2,0)
=14	Lee Redmond ( (Western Australia) )	3	(2,1,0,0,0)
=14	Ty Platt ( (New South Wales) )	3	(0,1,0,1,1)
16	Rusty Harrison ( (South Australia) )	0	(0,0,0,ns,ns)
17	Ashley Jones ( (Victoria (state)) ) (Res)	0	(0,0,0,0,0)

=== Final ===
1 Leigh Adams ( (Victoria (state)) )
2 Todd Wiltshire ( (New South Wales) )
3 Craig Watson ( (New South Wales) )
4 Mick Poole ( (New South Wales) )

=== Heat by heat ===
Placing	Rider	Total	1	2	3	4	5	6	7	8	9	10	11	12	13	14	15	16	17	18	19	20	Pts	Pos
1	(Victoria (state)) (10) Leigh Adams	15			3			3						3			3		3				15	1
2	(New South Wales) (13) Craig Watson	13				3	3							2		3					2		13	2
3	(New South Wales) (11) Todd Wiltshire	12			2				3		2					2						3	12	3
4	(New South Wales) (6) Mick Poole	12		2				2			3							2			3		12	4
5	(Victoria (state)) (1) Mark Lemon	10	2				2				1				3				2				10	5
6	(Queensland) (9) John Jørgensen	9			1		Fx						3					3		2			9	6
7	(Queensland) (7) Scott Smith	8		3					2					0	ns					3			8	7
8	(Victoria (state)) (2) Travis McGowan	7	3					0				3				1				Xf			7	8
9	(Queensland) (8) Christian Henry	6		0						3			2			0			1				6	9
10	(New South Wales) (14) Lee Herne	6				1		1					1		1							2	6	10
11	(Victoria (state)) (4) Kevin Doolan	6	1							2				1				1				1	6	11
12	(Victoria (state)) (12) Jason Stewart	5			0					0		2			2						1		5	12
13	(South Australia) (5) Rory Schlein	5		1			1					1					2					0	5	13
14	(Western Australia) (15) Lee Redmond	3				2			1			0						0	0				3	14
15	(New South Wales) (16) Ty Platt	3				0				1	0						1			1			3	15
16	(South Australia) (3) Rusty Harrison	0	0						0				0				ns				ns		0	16
17	(Victoria (state)) (17) Ashley Jones (Res)	1					0								0		0			0	0		0	17
Placing	Rider	Total	1	2	3	4	5	6	7	8	9	10	11	12	13	14	15	16	17	18	19	20	Pts	Pos

m - exclusion for exceeding two minute time allowance • t - exclusion for touching the tapes • x - other exclusion • e - retired or mechanical failure • f - fell • ns - non-starter • nc - non-classify

gate A - inside	gate B	gate C	gate D - outside

== See also ==
- Australia national speedway team
- Sport in Australia
