= British League Division Two Riders Championship =

British motorcycle speedway individual riders' competition

- Sport: Motorcycle speedway
- Founded: 1968
- Country: United Kingdom

Notes
- replaced by Premier League Riders Championship from 1997 competition above British League Riders' Championship

The British League Division Two Riders Championship was a motorcycle speedway contest between the top riders from each club (with the highest average points) competing in the second tier of British speedway.

== History ==
The championship was inaugurated in 1968 when it was known as the British League Division Two Riders Championship. The competition was known as the British League Division Two Riders' Championship between 1968 and 1974 and again between 1991 and 1994. From 1975 until 1990 it was known as the National League Riders' Championship.

The competition was held at Hackney between 1968 and 1971, then it was moved to Wimbledon and held there between 1972 and 1984. The last year of the tournament was 1994, after which speedway was restructured with the top two leagues combining to form the Premier League. After two seasons the Premier League became the second tier/division of British speedway in 1997, this resulted in the Premier League Riders Championship effectively being a continuation of the British League Division Two Riders Championship from 1997.

== Winners ==
Year	Winner	Team	2nd	Team	3rd	Team
British League Division Two Riders' Championship
1968	Graham Plant	Middlesbrough Teessiders	Ken Eyre	Belle Vue Colts	Graeme Smith	Rayleigh Rockets
1969	Geoff Ambrose	Crayford Highwaymen	Mick Bell	Reading Racers	Ross Gilbertson	Romford Bombers
1970	Dave Jessup	Eastbourne Eagles	Barry Crowson	Canterbury Crusaders	Gary Peterson	Bradford Northern
1971	John Louis	Ipswich Witches	Malcolm Shakespeare	Long Eaton Archers	Hugh Saunders	Rayleigh Rockets
1972	Phil Crump	Crewe Kings	Arthur Price	Boston Barracudas	Bob Coles	Barrow Happy Faces
1973	Arthur Price	Boston Barracudas	Bobby McNeil	Eastbourne Eagles	Lou Sansom	Workington Comets
1974	Carl Glover	Boston Barracudas	Ted Hubbard	Canterbury Crusaders	Phil Herne	Birmingham Brummies
National League Riders' Championship
1975	Laurie Etheridge	Crayford Kestrels	Brian Collins	Coatbridge Tigers	Arthur Browning	Birmingham Brummies
1976	Joe Owen	Newcastle Diamonds	John Jackson	Ellesmere Port Gunners	Ted Hubbard	Rye House Rockets
1977	Colin Richardson	Eastbourne Eagles	Martin Yeates	Oxford Cheetahs	Tom Owen	Newcastle Diamonds
1978	Steve Koppe	Canterbury Crusaders	John Jackson	Ellesmere Port Gunners	Ted Hubbard	Rye House Rockets
1979	Ian Gledhill	Stoke Potters	Steve Wilcock	Middlesbrough Tigers	Andy Grahame	Milton Keynes Knights
1980	Wayne Brown	Berwick Bandits	Martin Yeates	Weymouth Wildcats	Steve Finch	Ellesmere Port Gunners
1981	Mike Ferreira	Canterbury Crusaders	Simon Wigg	Weymouth Wildcats	Bruce Cribb	Wolverhampton Wolves
1982	Joe Owen	Newcastle Diamonds	Steve Lomas	Boston Barracudas	Bob Garrad	Rye House Rockets
1983	Steve McDermott	Berwick Bandits	Richard Knight	Mildenhall Fen Tigers	Martin Yeates	Weymouth Wildcats
1984	Ian Barney	Peterborough Panthers	Dave Perks	Long Eaton Invaders	Martin Yeates	Weymouth Wildcats
1985	Neil Middleditch	Arena Essex Hammers	Kevin Hawkins	Peterborough Panthers	Trevor Banks	Hackney Hawks
1986	Paul Thorp	Stoke Potters	Steve Schofield	Poole Pirates	Les Collins	Edinburgh Monarchs
1987	Andrew Silver	Arena Essex Hammers	Nigel Crabtree	Stoke Potters	David Blackburn	Newcastle Diamonds
1988	Troy Butler	Milton Keynes Knights	Mark Loram	Hackney Hawks	Kenny McKinna	Glasgow Tigers
1989	Mark Loram	Ipswich Witches	Kenny McKinna	Glasgow Tigers	David Blackburn	Berwick Bandits
1990	Andy Grahame	Wimbledon Dons	Chris Louis	Ipswich Witches	Craig Boyce	Poole Pirates
British League Division Two Riders' Championship
1991	Jan Stæchmann	Long Eaton Invaders	David Bargh	Newcastle Diamonds	Troy Butler	Milton Keynes Knights
1992	Róbert Nagy	Glasgow Tigers	Mick Poole	Peterborough Panthers	Richard Green	Exeter Falcons
1993	Gary Allan	Swindon Robins	Mick Poole	Peterborough Panthers	Tony Langdon	Oxford Cheetahs
1994	Paul Bentley	Middlesbrough Bears	Tony Olsson	Swindon Robins	Tony Langdon	Swindon Robins

== Sponsors ==
- Gauloises (1976–1977, 1979)
- Toshiba (1980)
- Daily Mirror (1982)
- Fabryka Samochodów Osobowych (1983)
- Jawa Moto & Barum (1987–1994)

== See also ==
- List of United Kingdom Speedway League Riders' champions
- Speedway in the United Kingdom
