= 1991 Australian Under-21 Individual Speedway Championship =

Seasons
- ← 1990 1992 →

The 1991 Australian Under-21 Individual Speedway Championship was the 5th running of the Australian Under-21 Individual Speedway Championship organised by Motorcycling Australia. The final took place on 6 January 1991 at the Olympic Park Speedway in Mildura, Victoria. The championship was won by Mildura's own Leigh Adams who won the third of his four national Under-21 championships. Shane Parker from Adelaide was second with another Mildura rider Jason Lyons in third place. Parker defeated Lyons in a run-off for the minor placings after both finished the meeting on 13 points. Former South Australian champion Scott Norman defeated Dave Hamnett from New South Wales in a run-off for fourth place after both finished the meeting on 11 points.

== 1991 Australian Under-21 Solo Championship ==
- 6 January 1991
- (Victoria (state)) Mildura, Victoria – Olympic Park Speedway
- Referee:

Pos.	Rider	Points	Details
Gold	Leigh Adams ( (Victoria (state)) )	15	
Silver	Shane Parker ( (South Australia) )	13+3	
Bronze	Jason Lyons ( (Victoria (state)) )	13+2	
4	Scott Norman ( (South Australia) )	11+3	
5	Dave Hamnett ( (New South Wales) )	11+2	
6	Mark Lemon ( (Victoria (state)) )	10	
7	Damon Richardson ( (South Australia) )	8	
8	Jason Hawkes ( (Victoria (state)) )	7	
9	Cory Alderton ( (Victoria (state)) )	7	
10	Matthew Poole ( (New South Wales) )	6	
11	Brett Tomkins ( (South Australia) )	6	
12	John Reid ( (Queensland) )	6	
13	Clinton Butler ( (Queensland) )	4	
14	Jamie Plumb ( (New South Wales) )	2	
15	Ty Platt ( (New South Wales) )	1	
16	Steven Butler ( (Queensland) )	0	
17	Reece Davison ( (Victoria (state)) ) (Res)	–	did not ride
18	Steve Graetz ( (South Australia) ) (Res)	–	did not ride

== See also ==
- Australia national speedway team
- Sport in Australia
