= 1992 Speedway Under-21 World Championship =

European motorcycle speedway event

World Under-21 Championship
- Venue: Speedway Stadion Pfaffenhofen
- Location: Pfaffenhofen an der Ilm, Germany
- Start date: 23 August 1992

The 1992 Individual Speedway Junior World Championship was the 16th edition of the World motorcycle speedway Under-21 Championships.

The final was won by Leigh Adams of Australia after he defeated Mark Loram in a run-off for the title. The meeting had been delayed following a thunderstorm and the track remained wet which made overtaking difficult.

== World final ==
- 23 August 1992
- (Germany) Speedway Stadion Pfaffenhofen, Pfaffenhofen an der Ilm

Placing	Rider	Total	1	2	3	4	5	6	7	8	9	10	11	12	13	14	15	16	17	18	19	20	Pts	Pos	21
1	(Australia) (11) Leigh Adams	14			3				3		3					2						3	14	1	3
2	(England) (9) Mark Loram	14			2		3						3					3		3			14	2	2
3	(England) (2) Joe Screen	13	2					3				3				3				2			13	3	
4	(Norway) (7) Lars Gunnestad	10		3					0					3	3					1			10	4	
5	(Poland) (3) Tomasz Gollob	10	1						2				1				3				3		10	5	
6	(England) (8) David Norris	9		1						2			2			1			3				9	6	
7	(Sweden) (5) Niklas Klingberg	9		2			2					1					2					2	9	7	
8	(Sweden) (1) Jorgen Hultgren	8	3				1				1				1				2				8	8	
9	(Denmark) (15) Hans Clausen	8				3			1			2						1	1				8	9	
10	(Sweden) (6) Mikael Karlsson	8		0				2			2							2			2		8	10	
11	(Poland) (4) Tomasz Bajerski	6	0							3				2				0				1	6	11	
12	(Commonwealth of Independent States) (12) Viktor Gajdym	4			T					1		0			2						1		4	12	
13	(Sweden) (10) Robert Johansson	3			X			1						1			1		E				3	13	
14	(Denmark) (16) Kim Brandt	2				2				0	T						0			0			2	14	
15	(Poland) (14) Robert Sawina	1				1		X					-		-							-	1	15	
16	(Germany) (13) Matthias Koch	0				0	0							X		0					0		0	16	
R1	(Czech Republic) (R1) Jiri Stovicek	0			F								T		F								0	R1	
R2	(Denmark) (R2) Rene Madsen	0									0		0									0	0	R2	
Placing	Rider	Total	1	2	3	4	5	6	7	8	9	10	11	12	13	14	15	16	17	18	19	20	Pts	Pos	21

m - exclusion for exceeding two minute time allowance • t - exclusion for touching the tapes • x - other exclusion • e - retired or mechanical failure • f - fell • ns - non-starter • nc - non-classify

gate A - inside	gate B	gate C	gate D - outside
