= René Madsen =

Danish speedway rider

- Born: 1 December 1972 (age 53); Silkeborg, Denmark
- Nationality: Danish

Career history

Denmark
- 1992: Holsted
- 2002: Kronjylland

Great Britain
- 1993–1995: Oxford
- 1996: Long Eaton
- 1996–1997: Peterborough
- 1998: Berwick
- 1999: Belle Vue
- 1999: Coventry
- 2000: Stoke

Individual honours
- 1991: Danish U21 Championship silver

René Madsen (born 1 December 1972) is a former motorcycle speedway rider from Denmark.

== Career ==
Madsen came to prominence in 1991 when he won the silver medal at the Danish Under 21 Individual Speedway Championship behind Kim Brandt. He duly competed in the Speedway Under-21 World Championship and reached the final of the 1992 Speedway Under-21 World Championship as the reserve. In 1993, he reached a second consecutive final and finished 13th in the 1993 Speedway Under-21 World Championship.

The performances attracted interest from Britain and Madsen made his British leagues debut during the 1993 British League Division Two season, where he rode for Oxford Cheetahs. In his third season with Oxford he performed in the top league during the 1995 Premier League speedway season.

In 1996, Madsen signed for Peterborough Panthers and began to compete in longtrack. He reached the semi final of the 1998 Individual Long Track World Championship. His final season in Britain was with the Stoke Potters in 2000.
