= Tony Rose =

American book publisher, author and music executive

Tony Rose (October 11, 1950 – May 2025) was an American book publisher, author and music executive. He was the founder of Amber Books and Amber Communications Group, Inc., and earlier ran the production company Solid Platinum Records and Productions. He was associated with the development of the Boston Black music scene.

== Early life and military service ==
Rose was born on October 11, 1950, in the Roxbury neighborhood of Boston, Massachusetts. He grew up in the Whittier Street housing projects. His survivors included his sister, Felicia Rose.

Rose served in the United States Air Force during the Vietnam War. He later studied at the University of Massachusetts, the University of California, Los Angeles, and the New England Conservatory of Music.

== Music career ==
Rose began his music career in Los Angeles, working at WEA and RCA Records, before returning to Boston in the late 1970s, where he worked with Maurice Starr and Michael Jonzun. He founded Solid Platinum Records and Productions, and in 1982 it became the first African American-owned production company to sign a production deal with Virgin Records, according to a press release issued after his death.

Rose managed and produced Prince Charles Alexander and Prince Charles and the City Beat Band. Their albums Gang War, Stone Killers and Combat Zone were released through Solid Platinum and are described as having achieved gold status.

In the late 1980s Rose owned Hit City Recording Studio in Boston, where New Kids on the Block recorded; he sold the studio to Starr in 1990. He received gold and platinum certifications and Ampex Golden Reel Awards as a producer and engineer, particularly for his work with New Kids on the Block.

Rose was described as one of the architects of Boston's Black music scene, which produced acts including New Edition, The Jonzun Crew, New Kids on the Block, and Prince Charles and the City Beat Band.

== Television ==
Rose proposed Dance Slam, a local youth dance program for Boston Neighborhood Network, and co-produced it with Dan Richardson of the network. It premiered on July 8, 1989, and ran for ten episodes.

== Publishing career ==
Rose founded Amber Books in 1996. Its first title, Is Modeling for You? The Handbook and Guide for the Young Aspiring Black Model (1997), was a how-to book that he and his wife, Yvonne Rose, produced and first sold at a festival. According to Publishers Weekly, he formed Amber Communications Group in 1998. The company is based in Phoenix, Arizona.

By 2013 the company had six imprints, including Colossus Books (celebrity and musician biographies) and Amber/Wiley Books, which published self-help and financial titles co-published with John Wiley & Sons. Amber Books and its sister company Quality Press, headed by Yvonne Rose, published more than 1,000 titles over nearly three decades. In 2003 the American Booksellers Association described Amber Books as the nation's largest African American self-help and career guide publishing house.

Rose co-founded the African American Pavilion at BookExpo America in 2004 and led the Katrina Literary Collective, which donated more than 90,000 books to Hurricane Katrina survivors. His own books include Before the Legend: The Rise of New Kids on the Block and a Guy Named Maurice Starr (2011), America: The Black Point of View (2015) and The Autobiography of an American Ghetto Boy (2016).

== Awards and recognition ==
In 2003, Rose was named the first African-American Publisher of the Year at the BlackBoard Books of the Year awards, presented at BookExpo America in Los Angeles. In 2013, Amber Books won the NAACP Image Award for Outstanding Literary Work – Youth/Teens for Obama Talks Back: Global Lessons – A Dialogue with America's Young Leaders by Gregory J. Reed.

== Death ==
Rose died at his home in Phoenix, Arizona, in late May 2025, at the age of 74, after a battle with cancer. His life's work is archived at the University of Massachusetts Boston.
