= Leigh Adams =

Australian motorcycle speedway rider (born 1971)

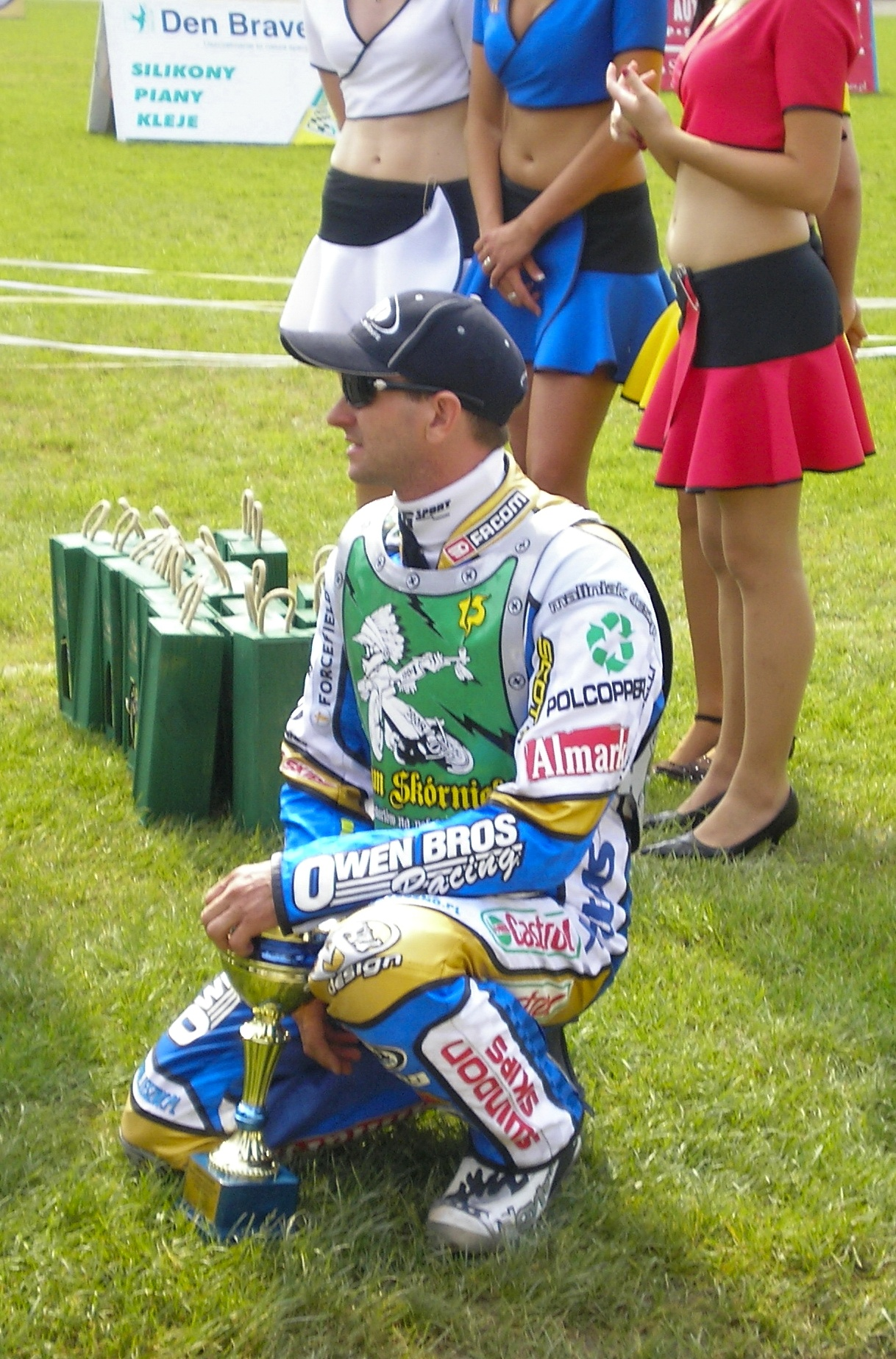
- Born: 28 April 1971 (age 55); Mildura, Victoria
- Nationality: Australian

Career history

Great Britain
- 1990–1992, 1997–1998, 2004–2010: Swindon Robins
- 2001–2002: Oxford Cheetahs
- 1999–2000: King's Lynn Stars
- 1996: London Lions
- 1993–1995: Arena-Essex Hammers
- 1989, 2003: Poole Pirates

Poland
- 1991–1992, 1994–1995: Lublin
- 1993: Wrocław
- 1996–2010: Leszno

Sweden
- 1994–1996: Vetlanda
- 1998–1999: Indianerna
- 2000–2008: Masarna
- 2009–2010: Lejonen

Denmark
- 2010: Esbjerg

Speedway Grand Prix statistics
- Starts: 105
- Podiums: 15 (8-2-5)
- Finalist: 20 times
- Winner: 8 times

Individual honours
- 1993: Commonwealth Champion
- 1992, 1993, 1994, 1998, 2000, 2002, 2003, 2005, 2006, 2009: Australian Champion
- 1992: World Under-21 Champion
- 1988, 1990, 1991, 1992: Australian Under-21 Champion
- 1989, 1990, 1991, 1992, 1994, 1995: Victorian State Champion
- 1994, 1997, 2001, 2002, 2003: Jack Young Solo Cup winner
- 1996: Edward Jancarz Memorial winner
- 1997, 1998, 2000: Australian Masters Series 500 Champion
- 1999: Australian Long Track Champion
- 1999, 2000, 2001, 2004: Golden Helmet of Pardubice
- 2000, 2008: Alfred Smoczyk Memorial winner
- 2009: Elite League Riders' Championship

Team honours
- 1999: World Team Cup winner
- 2001, 2002: World Cup Winner
- 2001, 2003: Elite League Champion
- 2003: Elite League KO Cup Winner
- 2004, 2005: Elite League Pairs Winner
- 2003: British League Cup Winner
- 2008: Elite Shield Winner
- 2007: Ekstraliga Champion
- 2000: Elitserien Champion
- 1992: Australian Pairs Champion

Leigh Scott Adams (born 28 April 1971 in Mildura, Victoria) is an Australian former motorcycle speedway rider. He is a multiple Speedway Grand Prix winner and World Team Champion. He also won a record ten Australian individual championships, four Australian Under-21 Championships and the 1992 Individual Speedway Junior World Championship.

== Career ==
=== Australia ===
Adams was a product of junior speedway in his home town of Mildura, which was also the home town of multiple Victorian and Australian champion Phil Crump who became his mentor. Adams started racing in 1979 and within a few years would prove himself as one of Australia's best junior solo riders. He finished third in the 1983 Australian U/16 Championship at his home track, the Olympic Park Speedway, before finishing second in the 1985 Championship at the Sidewinders Speedway in Adelaide. Adams won the Australian Under-16 championship in 1986 at the age of 15 which was held in Mildura, before joining the senior ranks in 1987.

Adams would win the first of four Australian Under-21 Championships in 1988 at North Arm in Adelaide, before going on to win again in 1990 at the Riverland Speedway in Renmark, 1991 at Olympic Park and 1992 at the Riverview Speedway in Murray Bridge.

Adams won the Australian Solo Championship in 1992 (North Arm), 1993 (Brisbane Exhibition Ground), 1994 (Olympic Park), 1998 (Murray Bridge), 2000 (Gosford), 2002 (Wayville Showground, Adelaide), 2003 (Gosford), 2005, 2006 and finally 2009. He won his first national title at the North Arm Speedway in Adelaide with a 14 points from his 5 rides, and his tenth and last championship also in Adelaide at Gillman Speedway after dominating the three-round championship with 15 wins from 15 rides.

Adams won his first Victorian State Championship in 1989 in Mildura in what was only his third season of senior riding, beating Phil Crump at Olympic Park. In the early days of his career, and the last of Crump's which had begun in 1970, Crump and Adams were known as "The Master and the Apprentice". Adams would also win the Victorian title in 1990 (Myrtleford), 1991 and 1992 (Mildura), 1994 (Undera) and 1995 (Mildura).

While the reigning Australian U/21 and Senior Champion in 1992, Adams went on to win the 1992 Under-21 World Championship at Pfaffenhofen an der Ilm in Germany to become the Australia's first U/21 World Champion since 1983.

In 1997 and 1998, Adams won the 10 Round Australian Speedway Masters Series (also known as the "Series 500"). He finished runner up in the series to Jason Crump in 1999, and the final year the series was run in 2000 he was once again the Series 500 champion.

1999 also saw Adams win the Australian Long Track Championship in Port Pirie, South Australia, making him the only rider to have won the Australian U/16 (plus Pairs), U/21, Senior (plus Pairs) and Long Track championships. Adams holds the record for most Australian Solo Championship wins with 10 and jointly holds the record for most Australian Under-21 Championship wins with 2012 World Champion Chris Holder. Both riders won the junior title on four occasions.

=== International ===
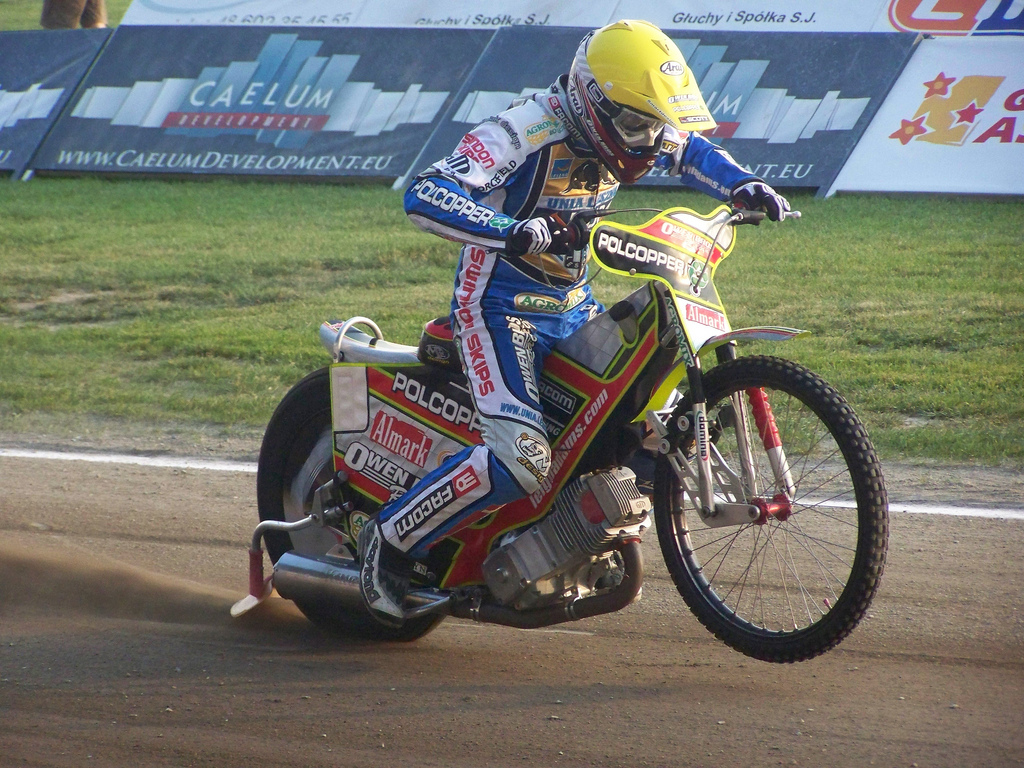
Leigh Adams, rode for Unia Leszno from 1996 to 2010

Adams first came to England in 1988 and completed four matches for Poole Pirates in the National Junior League. Adams had originally been recommended to Poole by their Australian team manager Neil Street (the father-in-law of Phil Crump), and it was Poole he subsequently joined for their National League Championship winning season of 1989.

To further his career, Adams then moved up a league to join Swindon Robins for the 1990 season. He made his Robins' debut when scoring 8+2 points from six rides against Oxford Cheetahs in a Gold Cup match at Blunsdon on 24 March. Adams won the first of his record ten Australian national titles in 1992, and also captured the World Under-21 Championship after beating Mark Loram in a race-off at Pfaffenhofen an der Ilm, Germany. With Swindon relegated to the British League Division Two after the 1992 season, Leigh moved on to spend three years with Arena Essex (1993–95)

In October 1995, during the Speedway Grand Prix Qualification, Adams won the GP Challenge, which ensured that he claimed a permanent slot for the 1996 Grand Prix. He repeated the success two years later in 1997.

Adams had a single season with the London Lions in 1996 before returning to Swindon in 1997 and recorded a 9.96 average in the inaugural season of the Elite League. Adams was again back with the Robins in 1998 but with Swindon again dropping down a league in 1999, he left and signed for the King's Lynn Stars. Adams remained at King's Lynn for the 2000 campaign and topped the Elite League riders averages, finishing the season on 10.24.

In 2001, Adams signed for Oxford and won the Elite League Championship. He remained with Oxford in 2002, which was a year in which Adams won his first Speedway Grand Prix, after claiming the 2002 Speedway Grand Prix of Scandinavia at the Ullevi in Gothenburg.

The 2003 season saw Adams register a 9.97 league average back with Poole Pirates in a year which Poole won the treble; winning the League Championship, the Knock-Out Cup and the British League Cup. The year also saw him awarded a testimonial, which took place at Swindon.

Adams returned to Swindon in 2004 and again finished top of the Elite League averages on 10.94 and partnered Charlie Gjedde to victory in the Elite League Pairs Championship. In 2005, Adams partnered new Swindon signing Lee Richardson to the Elite League Pairs Championship at Peterborough. On the world stage, Leigh ended his tenth season of Grand Prix activity with his highest ever ranking by winning the bronze medal after being the World No. 4 for the previous three years.

Adams put together another successful season for Swindon in 2007, as the club finished runners-up in all three major domestic finals, being beaten by Coventry in the Elite League Play-Offs final, Knock-Out Cup final and Craven Shield final. Adams completed his best ever Grand Prix campaign in 2007, finishing second overall to Nicki Pedersen. In a consistent Grand Prix campaign, he took victory in three rounds and completed the series with 153 points.

In 2008, Adams became the Swindon Robins all-time top points scorer. His paid maximum at Lakeside in August 2008 took him onto 5,482.5 points, surpassing the previous record set by Martin Ashby who scored 5,476.5 during his time with the Robins. In 2009, he won the Elite League Riders' Championship, held at Brandon Stadium on 2 October.

== Retirement ==
In 2010, Adams announced his retirement from speedway after 20 years of international competition. This along with a junior career which started in 1982 and saw him win the Australian and Victorian Under-16 Championships.

In 2011, Adams fulfilled a long-term ambition and entered the Finke Desert Race in Australia's Northern Territory near Alice Springs. On 6 June, while on a training ride with his brother and other riders, Adams crashed his motorbike into rocky terrain and sustained multiple injuries including fractured vertebrae, extensive spinal cord damage and broken ribs. He was flown from Alice Springs to Royal Adelaide Hospital where he underwent a six-hour operation to stabilise and strengthen his badly injured spine.

In 2012–13, Adams provided television commentary for Australia's World Series Sprintcars series.

== Family ==
In 2014, Adams' son Declan finished third in the Australian Under-16 Championship at the Pinjar Park Speedway in Perth, Western Australia.

== Career honours ==
- 1986 Australian Under-16 Champion, Australian Under-16 Pairs Champion
- 1988 Australian Under-21 Champion
- 1989 Victorian State Champion
- 1990 Australian Under-21 Champion & Victorian State Champion
- 1991 Australian Under-21 Champion & Victorian State Champion
- 1992 World Under-21 Champion, Australian Champion, Australian Pairs Champion, Australian Under-21 Champion (record 4th Australian U/21 Championship) & Victorian State Champion
- 1993 Australian Champion
- 1993 Commonwealth Champion
- 1994 Australian Champion
- 1994 Jack Young Memorial Cup winner & Victorian State Champion
- 1995 GP Challenge winner & Victorian State Champion
- 1996 Edward Jancarz Memorial winner
- 1997 Jack Young Memorial Cup winner
- 1997 Australian Masters Series 500 Champion
- 1998 Australian Masters Series 500 Champion
- 1998 Australian Champion & GP Challenge winner
- 1999 World Team Cup Champion, Australian Long Track Champion & Golden Helmet of Pardubice winner. For this feat, he was award the Australian Sports Medal in 2000.
- 2000 Australian Champion, Australian Masters Series 500 Champion, Golden Helmet of Pardubice & Alfred Smoczyk Memorial winner
- 2001 World Cup Champion, British Elite League (Oxford), Golden Helmet of Pardubice & Jack Young Solo Cup winner
- 2002 World Cup Champion, Australian Champion, Scandinavian GP & Jack Young Solo Cup winner
- 2003 Australian Champion, British Elite League, KO Cup, British League Cup (Poole), Slovenian GP & Jack Young Solo Cup winner
- 2004 Golden Helmet of Pardubice, British Elite League Best Pairs & Swedish GP
- 2005 Australian Champion, British Elite League Best Pairs
- 2006 Australian Champion
- 2007 Swedish GP, Scandinavian GP & Latvian GP winner
- 2008 European GP, Scandinavian GP & Alfred Smoczyk Memorial winner
- 2009 Australian Champion (record 10th Australian Championship) & Elite League Riders' Champion

== World final appearances ==
=== Individual World Championship ===
- 1993 - (Germany) Pocking, Rottalstadion - 15th - 4pts

=== World Pairs Championship ===
- 1990 - (Germany) Landshut, Ellermühle Stadium (with Todd Wiltshire) - 2nd - 41pts (16)
- 1992 - (Italy) Lonigo, Santa Marina Stadium (with Craig Boyce / Shane Parker) - 7th - 10pts (4)
- 1993 - (Denmark) Vojens, Speedway Center (with Craig Boyce / Jason Lyons) - 6th - 13pts (7)

=== World Team Cup ===
- 1994 - (Germany) Brokstedt, Holsteinring Brokstedt (with Craig Boyce) - 4th - 17pts (7)
- 1995 - (Poland) Bydgoszcz, Polonia Bydgoszcz Stadium (with Jason Crump / Craig Boyce) - 5th - 14pts (0)
- 1999 - (Czech Republic) Pardubice, Svítkova Stadion (with Jason Crump / Ryan Sullivan / Jason Lyons / Todd Wiltshire) - Winner - 40pts (14)
- 2000 - (England) Coventry, Brandon Stadium (with Jason Crump / Ryan Sullivan / Todd Wiltshire / Craig Boyce) - 4th - 29pts (12)

=== World Cup ===
- 2001 - (Poland) Wrocław, Olympic Stadium (with Jason Crump / Todd Wiltshire / Craig Boyce / Ryan Sullivan) - Winner - 68pts (16)
- 2002 - Peterborough, East of England Showground (with Todd Wiltshire / Jason Lyons / Jason Crump / Ryan Sullivan) - Winner - 64pts (17)
- 2003 - (Denmark) Vojens, Speedway Center (with Jason Crump / Todd Wiltshire / Jason Lyons / Ryan Sullivan) - 2nd - 57pts (15)
- 2006 - (England) Reading, Smallmead Stadium (with Travis McGowan / Ryan Sullivan / Todd Wiltshire / Jason Crump) - 4th - 35pts (8)
- 2007 - (Poland) Leszno, Alfred Smoczyk Stadium (with Ryan Sullivan / Jason Crump / Chris Holder / Davey Watt / Rory Schlein) - 3rd - 29pts (5)
- 2008 - (Denmark) Vojens, Speedway Center (with Chris Holder / Jason Crump / Ryan Sullivan / Davey Watt) - 4th - 21pts (6)
- 2009 - (Poland) Leszno, Alfred Smoczyk Stadium (with Davey Watt / Troy Batchelor / Chris Holder / Jason Crump] - 2nd - 43pts (12)

=== Individual Under-21 World Championship ===
- 1989 - (Italy) Lonigo, Santa Marina Stadium - 7th - 9pts
- 1992 - (West Germany) Pfaffenhofen an der Ilm, Speedway Stadion Pfaffenhofen - Winner - 14+3pts

== Speedway Grand Prix results ==
Year	Position	Points	Best finish	Notes
1996	15th	28	8th	
1997	10th	42	9th	
1998	11th	51	5th	
1999	7th	67	4th	Made 4 semi-finals but only reached final once
2000	6th	65	4th	
2001	5th	69	3rd	Third in the Danish Grand Prix
2002	4th	127	Winner	Won the Swedish Grand Prix
2003	4th	126	Winner	Won the Slovenian Grand Prix
2004	4th	131	Winner	Won the Swedish Grand Prix
2005	3rd	107	2nd	Second in the European Grand Prix
2006	5th	106	3rd	Highest placed rider not to win a GP (3rd in Scandinavia)
2007	2nd	153	Winner	Won Swedish, Scandinavian and Latvian Grand Prix
2008	6th	125	Winner	Won European and Scandinavian Grand Prix
2009	11th	81	2nd	

=== Grand Prix wins ===
- 1: 2002 Speedway Grand Prix of Scandinavia
- 2: 2003 Speedway Grand Prix of Slovenia
- 3: 2004 Speedway Grand Prix of Sweden
- 4: 2007 Speedway Grand Prix of Sweden
- 5: 2007 Speedway Grand Prix of Scandinavia
- 6: 2007 Speedway Grand Prix of Latvia
- 7: 2008 Speedway Grand Prix of Europe
- 8: 2008 Speedway Grand Prix of Scandinavia

== See also ==
- Australia national speedway team
