= Martin Goodwin =

English speedway rider

- Born: 15 January 1960 (age 66); Pembury, Kent, England
- Nationality: British (English)

Career history
- 1984–1990: Arena Essex Hammers
- 1984: Eastbourne Eagles
- 1985: Wolverhampton Wolves
- 1991–1993: Rye House Rockets
- 1994–1996: Oxford Cheetahs

Individual honours
- 1993: British Championship finalist

Martin D. Goodwin (born 15 January 1960) is a former motorcycle speedway rider from England.

== Speedway career ==
Goodwin rode in the top tier of British Speedway from 1984 to 1996, riding for various clubs. In July 1991, he was suspended for the remainder of the season after breaking the window of the referee's box after being excluded in a race.

Goodwin reached the final of the British Speedway Championship in 1993.

In 1994, Goodwin helped the Oxford Cheetahs win the Fours Championship during the 1994 British League Division Two season.
