= Stephen Davies (speedway rider) =

Australian speedway rider

- Born: 31 January 1965 (age 61); Newcastle, New South Wales, Australia
- Nationality: Australian

Career history
- 1986-1990: King's Lynn Stars
- 1991-1992: Peterborough Panthers

Individual honours
- 1989, 1990: Australian National Championships silver & bronze
- 1986, 1988, 1989: New South Wales State Champion

Team honours
- 1992: Triple; League, Knockout Cup & Fours

Stephen Mark Davies (born 31 January 1965) is an Australian former international speedway rider.

== Speedway career ==
Davies twice won medals at the Australian National Championships. He won a silver medal in 1989 behind Glenn Doyle and a bronze medal the following year in 1990. He was the champion of New South Wales on several occasions and reached the 1987 Individual Long Track World Championship semi final.

After winning the New South Wales Championship in 1986, Davies arrived to race in Britain. Davies rode in the top tier of British Speedway from 1986 to 1990, riding for King's Lynn Stars. After leaving King's Lynn to join Peterborough Panthers in 1991, he captained the triple winning Peterborough side during the 1992 British League Division Two season.

== Personal life ==
Davies' son Alex, born in Northampton, was a professional rider in the UK from 2010 to 2018
