= Craig Watson (speedway rider) =

Australian motorcycle speedway rider (born 1976)

- Born: 6 August 1976 (age 50); Sydney, Australia
- Nationality: Australian

Career history

Great Britain
- 1997-1999, 2002-2006,: Newport Wasps
- 2000-2001, 2007: Poole Pirates
- 2003: Belle Vue Aces
- 2007: Glasgow Tigers
- 2008: Birmingham Brummies

Sweden
- 2000, 2005: Getingarna

Poland
- 2001: RKM Rybnik

Individual honours
- 1997, 1998, 2002: Australian Long Track Champion
- 2003: NZ Long Track Grand Prix
- 1996, 2004: NSW State Champion

Team honours
- 1999: Premier Trophy Winner

Craig Watson (born 6 August 1976 in Sydney, New South Wales) is an Australian former motorcycle speedway rider. Watson was the winner of the 1996 NSW State Championship. He is also a triple Australian Longtrack champion, having won the championship in 1997, 1998 and 2002.

== Career ==
Watson spent most of his career with the Newport Wasps. He failed to agree terms with the Newport promotion for 2007 and was eventually signed up by former club Poole Pirates in the Elite League. However, his scores were low and when he suffered an injury early in the season his replacement, Piotr Świst, did well enough to keep his place. Watson signed for Premier League team the Glasgow Tigers for the rest of the 2007 season and had a successful spell with the club.

At the start of 2008, Watson was again signed by his parent club the Poole Pirates to ride for them at reserve. However, the BSPA found that his greensheet average was incorrect and therefore his average would be too high for him to fit into the Poole squad. Watson was left without a club, but soon after once again signed for Premier League team Newport. Newport closed in May following the death of their owner, and Watson joined the Birmingham Brummies.
