= Ian Barney =

British speedway rider

- Born: 15 February 1961 (age 65); Stamford, Lincolnshire, England
- Nationality: British (English)

Career history
- 1980-1992, 1994, 2003: Peterborough Panthers
- 1982–1984: Eastbourne Eagles
- 1987–1988: King's Lynn Stars
- 1990: Exeter Falcons
- 1991: Sheffield Tigers
- 1993: Long Eaton Invaders
- 1994: Coventry Bees

Individual honours
- 1984: National League Riders' Champion

Team honours
- 1988, 1989: National League Fours Winner

Ian John Barney (born 15 February 1961) is a former speedway rider from England.

== Speedway career ==
Barney competed in the top two tiers of British Speedway from 1980 to 2003, riding for various clubs.

In 1984, Barney became the National League Riders' Champion, held at the East of England Arena on 13 October.

In 1988, Barney helped the Peterborough Panthers win the Fours Championship during the 1988 National League season. He repeated this success in 1989, helping the Peterborough Panthers win the Fours Championship again during the 1989 National League season.
