= Richard Green (speedway rider) =

British motorcycle speedway rider

- Born: 16 August 1965 (age 61); Wreningham, Norfolk, England
- Nationality: British (English)

Career history
- 1984–1987: Mildenhall Fen Tigers
- 1988–1993: Exeter Falcons
- 1995: Swindon Robins

Richard Green (born 16 August 1965) is a former international motorcycle speedway rider from England. He earned one international cap for the England national speedway team.

== Biography ==
Green, born in Wreningham, Norfolk, began his British leagues career riding for Mildenhall Fen Tigers during the 1984 National League season. He had originally signed up for the King's Lynn Stars junior team.

Green remained with Mildenhall from 1984 to 1987, reached the Knockout Cup final in 1987. and improved his average from 3.92 to 5.91.

It was not until Green joined Exeter Falcons that his reputation began to grow. Starting in the 1988 season, when he had his best year to date averaging 6.46. After six years with the Devon club he hit a high of 8.80 in 1992. He was the club's leading rider for two seasons, topping the team's averages for both 1992 and 1993. Also in 1992, he finished third in the British League Division Two Riders Championship.

After suffering a serious neck injury, Green made a brief return for Swindon Robins in 1995 but only raced a couple of times and later received a benefit meeting on 24 March 1997.
