= Rob Woffinden =

British motorcycle speedway rider

- Born: 27 March 1962; Scunthorpe, Lincolnshire, England
- Died: 30 January 2010 (aged 47)
- Nationality: British (English)

Career history
- 1978–1982, 1984–1985: Scunthorpe Saints/Stags
- 1982–1983: Middlesbrough Tigers
- 1985: Rye House Rockets
- 1986: Boston Barracudas
- 1986: Birmingham Brummies
- 1987–1988: Berwick Bandits
- 1987, 1993–1994: Sheffield Tigers
- 1988: Edinburgh Monarchs
- 1988–1990: Stoke Potters
- 1990: Milton Keynes Knights

Individual honours
- 1988: Western Australian State Champion

Robert Woffinden (27 March 1962 – 30 January 2010) was a motorcycle speedway rider from England.

== Biography ==
Woffinden, born in Scunthorpe, started riding during the second half matches of the Scunthorpe Saints fixtures, at the Quibell Park Stadium as a 16-year old. He began his British leagues career, making an appearance for the Saints during the 1978 National League season.

The following season in 1979, Woffinden broke into the team (now called the Stags) more regularly and by the end of the 1981 season had improved his season average to 5.19. In 1982, he started for Scunthorpe before switching to the Middlesbrough Bears.

The following season in 1984, Woffinden re-joined the Stags and recorded season averages of 7.65 and 7.54 in 1984 and 1985 respectively. He captained the Stags in 1985 but picked up an injury and the team suffered heavy losses. The Stags promoter Tony Nicholls then revealed financial losses and the team were disbanded in May 1985. Woffinden saw out the season with Rye House Rockets.

Woffinden signed for Boston Barracudas in 1986 but moved on quickly to Birmingham Brummies. Woffinden continued his nomadic trend by riding for Berwick Bandits in 1987 and both Berwick and Edinburgh Monarchs in 1988.

Woffinden's form had dropped by the time he joined Stoke Potters for the 1989 National League season and after a poor season in 1990, he experienced a low when he was banned for two years by the Speedway Control Board after failing a drug's test.

Woffinden returned to the sport in 1993, riding for the Sheffield Tigers. He averaged over 5 but suffered a bad crash in July, breaking a wrist and fracturing his pelvis. He retired after one final season with Sheffield in 1994.

In 2010, Woffinden died after a long illness. Throughout the latter part of his speedway career he had ridden in Australia and set up a home there. The Rob Woffinden Classic is held every year in Australia in his memory.

== Family ==
Woffinden's son Tai went on to become a three times world champion.
