= Troy Butler =

Australian speedway rider

- Born: 22 September 1967 (age 59); Melbourne, Australia
- Nationality: Australian

Career history
- 1985, 1987, 1989–1990, 1992: Oxford Cheetahs
- 1987–1988, 1991: Milton Keynes Knights
- 1988: Swindon Robins
- 1988: Ipswich Witches

Individual honours
- 1986: Australian Champion
- 1988: British League Division Two Riders Champion
- 1989, 1990, 1991, 1992, 1993, 1994: Queensland State Champion

Team honours
- 1985: British League Champion
- 1985: British League KO Cup winner
- 1985: Midland Cup

Troy Steve Butler (born 22 September 1967) is a former speedway rider from Australia.

== Speedway career ==
Butler was champion of Australia when he won the 1986 Australian Championship.

Butler rode in the top tier of British Speedway riding for the Oxford Cheetahs from 1985 until 1992. He was signed by Oxford Cheetahs before the 1985 season after being seen in action by Hans Neilsen and Simon Wigg who were touring Australia at the time.

In 1988, Butler became the British League Division Two Riders Champion riding for Milton Keynes Knights. The final was held on 10 September 1988 at Brandon Stadium.
