= Nigel Crabtree =

British speedway rider

- Born: 15 March 1960 (age 66); Halifax, West Yorkshire, England
- Nationality: British (English)

Career history
- 1977–1980: Newcastle Diamonds
- 1979: Poole Pirates
- 1980, 1995–96: Hull Vikings
- 1982–1983: Scunthorpe Stags
- 1983: Birmingham Brummies
- 1984–1992: Stoke Potters
- 1984, 1988: Sheffield Tigers
- 1993–1994: Glasgow Tigers

Individual honours
- 1987: National League Riders' runner-up

Team honours
- 1984, 1989: National League Pairs Winner

Nigel Robin Crabtree (born 15 March 1960) is a former motorcycle speedway rider from England.

== Speedway career ==
Crabtree rode in the top two tiers of British Speedway from 1977 to 1996, riding for various clubs. In 1977, as a 16 year old, he made his Newcastle Diamonds debut but suffered serious injuries after crashing in March. He was unconscious for five minutes and sustained a broken collarbone and three ribs and a pelvis injury.

In 1984, Crabtree won the National League Pairs, partnering Tom Owen for the Stoke Potters, during the 1984 National League season.

In 1987, Crabtree finished runner-up in the National League Riders' Championship. He was regarded as one of the leading National League riders at the time, consistently finishing in the top ten averages.

In 1989, Crabtree won the National League Pairs for the second time, partnering Eric Monaghan for Stoke, during the 1989 National League season.
