= Mick Powell =

Australian speedway rider

- Born: 24 September 1969 (age 57); Brisbane, Australia
- Nationality: Australian

Career history
- 1989–1990, 1996: Edinburgh Monarchs
- 1991–1995, 1997–1999, 2002: Glasgow Tigers
- 1999: Berwick Bandits
- 2000–2001: Workington Comets
- 2003: Newcastle Diamonds

Team honours
- 1993, 1994: British League Division Two winner
- 1993, 1994: Knockout Cup winner
- 2000: Premier League Pairs winner

Michael George Powell (born 24 September 1969) is an Australian former motorcycle speedway rider.

== Career ==
Powell started his British leagues career during the 1989 National League season, where he rode for Edinburgh Monarchs. He spent two seasons with Edinburgh and struggled to find consistent form, before moving to Scottish rivals Glasgow Tigers in 1991.

Powell spent five years with Glasgow from 1991 to 1995, slowly improving his average and recorded a 7.43 average in 1993. He was part of the team that won the 'double double' (the 1993 and 1994 league and cup doubles).

In 1996, Glasgow failed to field a team so Powell appeared for the controversial Scottish Monarchs (Edinburgh racing at Glasgow) during the 1996 Premier League speedway season before returning to Glasgow in 1997. It was during 1997 that Powell established himself as one of Glasgow's leading riders and the following season in 1998 averaged an impressive 9.32.

In 2000, Powell moved from Glasgow to join Workington Comets and gained success by partnering Carl Stonehewer to the Premier League Pairs Championship title, held at Derwent Park. After two years with Workington he returned to Glasgow for a third time in 2002 and had one last season with Newcastle Diamonds in 2003.
