= Jason Lyons =

Australian speedway rider

- Born: 15 June 1970 (age 56); Mildura, Victoria
- Nationality: Australian

Career history

Great Britain
- 1990–1991: Glasgow Tigers
- 1992–2003, 2005: Belle Vue Aces
- 2002: Peterborough Panthers
- 2004: Poole Pirates
- 2004: Newcastle Diamonds
- 2006: Mildenhall Fen Tigers
- 2007–2010: Birmingham Brummies
- 2011: Redcar Bears

Poland
- 1996: Gorzów
- 1999–2000: Leszno
- 2001: Bydgoszcz
- 2002: Częstochowa
- 2003: Piła

Sweden
- 1998–2000: Örnarna
- 2001–2005: Vargarna

Individual honours
- 1993: Jack Young Memorial Cup winner
- 1996: Peter Craven Memorial winner
- 1997, 1998, 1999: Victorian State Champion
- 1998, 2001: Overseas Champion
- 1999: South Australian Champion

Team honours
- 1999: World Team Cup winner
- 2002: World Cup winner
- 1992: Australian Pairs Champion
- 1986: Australian Under-16 Pairs Champion
- 1993: British League
- 2004: Elite League Champion
- 2005: Elite League KO Cup winner
- 2009: Premier League Pairs Champion
- 2010: Premier League Fours Champion

Jason Rodney Lyons (born 15 June 1970 in Mildura, Victoria) is a former Australian international motorcycle speedway rider. Jason is the son of former rider Rod Lyons.

== Career history ==
Lyons started his United Kingdom career in 1990, with the Glasgow Tigers in the National League alongside fellow Aussie Shane Bowes from Adelaide. He joined the Belle Vue Aces in 1992 where he stayed for twelve consecutive seasons and where he gained the nickname 'Mr. Belle Vue'. Lyons was a member of the Australian team that won the World Team Cup in 1999 and the team that won the World Cup in 2002. The 2002 Final was run on the East of England Showground, the home track of his then Premier League club the Peterborough Panthers.

In his only appearance in the World Under-21 Championship final in 1991 at the Brandon stadium in Coventry, England, Lyons finished a fine third behind Danes Brian Andersen (winner) and Morten Andersen (second).

In 1993, Lyons won the Jack Young Memorial Cup at the North Arm Speedway in Adelaide, South Australia. In 1996 he won the Peter Craven Memorial at Belle Vue in Manchester. Both trophies are held in honour of former Speedway World Champions, with Lyons being the first Australian to win both Memorials.

In 2003 Lyons qualified for his only full season in the Speedway Grand Prix series, although he had ridden twice previously, finishing fourth in the Grand Prix of Great Britain in 2000.

In 2007, Lyons signed for the newly reformed Birmingham Brummies as captain and stayed with the Brummies until the end of 2010. He won the Premier League Pairs Championship for Birmingham in 2009, partnering Tomasz Piszcz, during the 2009 Premier League speedway season.

Lyons signed off his Birmingham career with a significant success, winning the Premier League Four-Team Championship, on 15 August 2010, at the East of England Arena.

In 2011, Lyons signed for the Redcar Bears alongside Gary Havelock.

== Australia ==
Lyons was the winner of the Australian Pairs Championship in 1992 as well as Victorian State Champion in 1997, 1998 and 1999 and he won the South Australian Championship in 1999.

Lyons has finished runner up five times in the Australian Championship, his best finish in his national championship. He also finished third in the 1991 Australian Under-21 Championship. In his junior speedway career, Lyons finished second behind good friend and fellow Mildura native Leigh Adams in the 1986 Australian Under-16 Championship. Coincidentally, his first three senior Australian Championship second places were also to Adams.

== World Final Appearances ==
=== World Pairs Championship ===
- 1993 - (Denmark) Vojens, Speedway Center (with Leigh Adams / Craig Boyce) - 6th - 13pts (5)

=== World Team Cup ===
- 1999 - (Czech Republic) Pardubice, Svítkova Stadion (with Jason Crump / Leigh Adams / Ryan Sullivan / Todd Wiltshire) - Winner - 40pts (10)

=== World Cup ===
- 2002 - Peterborough, East of England Showground (with Todd Wiltshire / Leigh Adams / Jason Crump / Ryan Sullivan) - Winner - 64pts (3)
- 2003 - (Denmark) Vojens, Speedway Center (with Jason Crump / Todd Wiltshire / Ryan Sullivan / Leigh Adams) - 2nd - 57pts (0)

=== Individual Under-21 World Championship ===
- 1991 - (England) Coventry, Brandon Stadium - 3rd - 11pts

== Speedway Grand Prix results ==
Year	Position	Points	Best finish	Notes
2000	22nd	16	4th	
2002	32nd	3	19th	
2003	20th	29	9th	
