= Tony Langdon =

Australian speedway rider

- Born: 20 June 1969 (age 57); Brisbane, Australia
- Nationality: Australian

Career history

Great Britain
- 1988–1992, 1996: Poole Pirates
- 1992: Sheffield Tigers
- 1993: Oxford Cheetahs
- 1994: Swindon Robins

Individual honours
- 1996: Queensland State Champion

Team honours
- 1994: Pairs winner

Anthony Michael Langdon (born 20 June 1969) is a former motorcycle speedway rider from Australia.

== Career ==
Langdon started his British leagues career during the 1988 National League season, where he rode for Poole Pirates. He stayed at Poole for five years, recording an average of 8.23 during the 1990 National League season.

In 1991, Poole competed in the British League division 1 (the highest league) and Langdon remained with them. In 1992, after a failed bid by Edinburgh Monarchs to sign him, he doubled up for Poole and for the Sheffield Tigers, where he averaged an impressive 9.21 for the latter. He joined the Oxford Cheetahs for the 1993 season and topped the team averages.

In 1994, Langdon won the British League Division Two Pairs Championship, partnering Tony Olsson for the Swindon Robins.

Langdon earned eight caps for the Australia national speedway team.

== Family ==
Langdon's brother Steve was also a professional speedway rider.
