= Mick Poole (speedway rider) =

Australian speedway rider

- Born: 27 November 1966 (age 59); Sydney, Australia
- Nationality: Australian

Career history
- 1985, 1988–1990, 1992–1993, 1995: Peterborough Panthers
- 1985, 1987–1988: King's Lynn Stars
- 1991: Poole Pirates
- 1994: Oxford Cheetahs

Individual honours
- 2001: Australian Championship bronze
- 1992, 1993: Div 2 League Riders' runner-up
- 1992, 1998, 1999, 2002, 2003: NSW State Champion

Team honours
- 1992: British League Division Two Champion
- 1992: Knockout Cup Winner
- 1988, 1989, 1992, 1994: National League Fours Winner

Michael Garth Poole (born 27 November 1966) is a former international speedway rider from Australia.

== Speedway career ==
Poole won a bronze medal at the Australian Championship in 2001 and won the Longtrack title the same year.

Poole rode in the top tier of British Speedway from 1985 to 1994, riding for various clubs, but spent most of his time with Peterborough Panthers. In 1988, he helped the Peterborough win the Fours Championship during the 1988 National League season. In 1989, he helped the Peterborough win the Fours Championship again, during the 1989 National League season.

Poole was part of the Peterborough team that completed the treble of league, knockout cup and fours during the 1992 British League Division Two season. Also in 1992, he finished runner-up in the British League Division Two Riders Championship, held on 19 September at Brandon Stadium. Poole and Róbert Nagy both finished on 13 points but Poole lost the run off for the title.

In 1993, Poole finished runner up again in the Riders' Championship after losing another run off for the title. Remarkably, he had tied once again on 13 points but this time with Gary Allan.

Poole won the fours (for a fourth time) in 1994, as part of the Oxford Cheetahs team during the 1994 British League Division Two season.

== Family ==
His son Taylor Poole was also a speedway rider.
