= 1989 National League season =

British speedway season

- League: National League
- No. of competitors: 18
- Champions: Poole Pirates
- Knockout Cup: Berwick Bandits
- Individual: Mark Loram
- Pairs: Stoke Potters
- Fours: Peterborough Panthers
- London Cup: Hackney Hawks
- Highest average: Steve Schofield
- Division/s above: 1989 British League

The National League was the second tier of British speedway racing in 1989.

== Team changes ==
Promoter Terry Cheney moved the Milton Keynes Knights out of the Groveway and into the Elfield Park.

== Summary ==
The champions that year were Poole Pirates.

Paul Muchene lost his life in the fixture between Arena Essex and Hackney at the Hackney Wick Stadium on 30 June 1989.

== Final table ==
| Pos | Team | PL | W | D | L | Pts |
|---|---|---|---|---|---|---|
| 1 | Poole Pirates | 34 | 26 | 1 | 7 | 53 |
| 2 | Wimbledon Dons | 34 | 23 | 2 | 9 | 48 |
| 3 | Berwick Bandits | 34 | 23 | 0 | 11 | 46 |
| 4 | Ipswich Witches | 34 | 23 | 0 | 11 | 46 |
| 5 | Exeter Falcons | 34 | 19 | 1 | 14 | 39 |
| 6 | Hackney Kestrels | 34 | 19 | 1 | 14 | 39 |
| 7 | Eastbourne Eagles | 34 | 19 | 0 | 15 | 38 |
| 8 | Edinburgh Monarchs | 34 | 19 | 0 | 15 | 38 |
| 9 | Glasgow Tigers | 34 | 17 | 0 | 17 | 34 |
| 10 | Stoke Potters | 34 | 16 | 1 | 17 | 33 |
| 11 | Peterborough Panthers | 34 | 16 | 0 | 18 | 32 |
| 12 | Arena Essex Hammers | 34 | 14 | 2 | 18 | 30 |
| 13 | Middlesbrough Tigers | 34 | 14 | 0 | 20 | 28 |
| 14 | Rye House Rockets | 34 | 13 | 0 | 21 | 26 |
| 15 | Newcastle Diamonds | 34 | 11 | 2 | 21 | 24 |
| 16 | Mildenhall Fen Tigers | 34 | 10 | 1 | 23 | 21 |
| 17 | Long Eaton Invaders | 34 | 10 | 1 | 23 | 21 |
| 18 | Milton Keynes Knights | 34 | 7 | 2 | 25 | 16 |

== Fixtures and results ==
| Home \ Away | AE | BER | EAS | ED | EX | GLA | HAC | IPS | LE | MID | MIL | MK | NEW | PET | PP | RH | STO | WIM |
|---|---|---|---|---|---|---|---|---|---|---|---|---|---|---|---|---|---|---|
| Arena Essex | | 46–49 | 50–45 | 51–45 | 50–44 | 52–44 | 48–48 | 54–40 | 43–51 | 47–48 | 55–40 | 67–28 | 49–46 | 54–41 | 56–39 | 51–45 | 45–50 | 48–48 |
| Berwick | 70–26 | | 62–32 | 61–34 | 78–18 | 68–28 | 60–36 | 61–35 | 71–25 | 72–24 | 65–31 | 65–31 | 59–35 | 57–39 | 59–37 | 72–23 | 66–30 | 51–44 |
| Eastbourne | 62–34 | 49–47 | | 66–30 | 67–29 | 55–39 | 52–44 | 55–41 | 61–35 | 62–34 | 47–49 | 65–30 | 67–28 | 43–53 | 52–44 | 59–37 | 59–37 | 48–47 |
| Edinburgh | 43–51 | 50–45 | 53–43 | | 62–34 | 56–39 | 51–45 | 47–49 | 61–34 | 64–32 | 69–27 | 59–36 | 59–37 | 51–45 | 42–54 | 55–41 | 68–28 | 42–53 |
| Exeter | 76–20 | 59–37 | 72–24 | 71–25 | | 61–34 | 57–39 | 60–36 | 63–33 | 76–20 | 71–25 | 62–33 | 61–35 | 53–42 | 57–38 | 59–37 | 49–47 | 64–32 |
| Glasgow | 64–32 | 50–46 | 56–40 | 52–43 | 64–32 | | 53–43 | 43–51 | 61–35 | 53–43 | 68–28 | 61–35 | 59–36 | 58–38 | 50–45 | 50–46 | 59–37 | 50–46 |
| Hackney | 60–36 | 50–46 | 67–29 | 53–43 | 55–40 | 62–33 | | 51–44 | 53–43 | 59–37 | 55–41 | 63–33 | 64–32 | 54–41 | 50–46 | 61–35 | 58–38 | 52–44 |
| Ipswich | 65–31 | 69–27 | 66–30 | 49–29 | 53–43 | 52–44 | 64–32 | | 59–37 | 58–37 | 53–43 | 58–38 | 56–40 | 51–45 | 47–48 | 55–41 | 49–47 | 52–44 |
| Long Eaton | 63–33 | 50–46 | 59–37 | 42–54 | 44–42 | 50–46 | 46–50 | 50–45 | | 44–52 | 48–48 | 57–39 | 43–53 | 51–45 | 42–53 | 59–37 | 38–58 | 37–59 |
| Middlesbrough | 46–47 | 44–52 | 45–50 | 45–50 | 52–44 | 54–42 | 49–47 | 55–40 | 57–39 | | 52–44 | 61–34 | 57–39 | 49–47 | 40–56 | 51–44 | 53–43 | 46–50 |
| Mildenhall | 49–47 | 37–59 | 43–53 | 42–53 | 47–49 | 48–46 | 49–47 | 42–54 | 65–30 | 63–33 | | 66–28 | 41–55 | 41–54 | 30–66 | 50–46 | 50–46 | 50–36 |
| Milton Keynes | 57–39 | 49–47 | 45–51 | 46–50 | 48–48 | 55–41 | 56–40 | 37–59 | 51–44 | 53–42 | 53–43 | | 48–48 | 35–61 | 38–58 | 43–52 | 41–55 | 44–52 |
| Newcastle | 45–51 | 36–60 | 49–47 | 44–52 | 49–46 | 42–54 | 51–45 | 53–43 | 50–45 | 44–51 | 49–47 | 50–46 | | 50–44 | 44–52 | 50–46 | 48–48 | 39–57 |
| Peterborough | 55–40 | 65–30 | 45–50 | 60–36 | 59–37 | 61–33 | 55–41 | 36–57 | 60–36 | 59–36 | 62–34 | 61–35 | 56–40 | | 42–54 | 52–44 | 58–38 | 46–47 |
| Poole | 71–24 | 44–52 | 59–37 | 61–35 | 55–41 | 68–28 | 51–44 | 50–46 | 66–30 | 66–30 | 59–37 | 68–28 | 59–36 | 51–45 | | 55–41 | 58–38 | 59–37 |
| Rye House | 53–42 | 38–57 | 51–45 | 49–46 | 53–42 | 52–44 | 45–50 | 43.5–50.5 | 60–35 | 61–34 | 55–41 | 61–34 | 49–46 | 52–44 | 44–51 | | 47–48 | 51–44 |
| Stoke | 68–28 | 54–42 | 56–40 | 47–49 | 60–36 | 60–36 | 52–44 | 47–49 | 46–49 | 64–32 | 56–40 | 63–33 | 53–43 | 67–29 | 42–54 | 56–40 | | 41–55 |
| Wimbledon | 68–28 | 53–43 | 51–45 | 67–29 | 57–39 | 54–42 | 57–39 | 53–43 | 62–34 | 71–24 | 57–39 | 62–34 | 70–26 | 57–39 | 48–48 | 51–45 | 54–42 | |

Legend: Blue = home team win; Yellow = draw; Red = away team win.

== National League Knockout Cup ==
The 1989 National League Knockout Cup was the 22nd edition of the Knockout Cup for tier two teams. Berwick Bandits were the winners of the competition.

First round

| Date | Team one | Score | Team two |
|---|---|---|---|
| 10/04 | Exeter | 62-34 | Rye House |
| 09/04 | Rye House | 57-39 | Exeter |
| 09/04 | Newcastle | 43-52 | Berwick |
| 08/04 | Berwick | 65-30 | Newcastle |

Second round

| Date | Team one | Score | Team two |
|---|---|---|---|
| 26/05 | Hackney | 42-54 | Poole |
| 17/05 | Wimbledon | 59-37 | Milton Keynes |
| 16/05 | Milton Keynes | 43-53 | Wimbledon |
| 16/05 | Poole | 66-33 | Hackney |
| 15/05 | Exeter | 52-44 | Stoke |
| 14/05 | Eastbourne | 64-32 | Glasgow |
| 14/05 | Mildenhall | 45-51 | Peterborough |
| 13/05 | Berwick | 69-27 | Long Eaton |
| 13/05 | Stoke | 51-45 | Exeter |
| 12/05 | Glasgow | 48-48 | Eastbourne |
| 12/05 | Peterborough | 63-33 | Mildenhall |
| 10/05 | Long Eaton | 43-53 | Berwick |
| 06/05 | Arena Essex | 57-39 | Edinburgh |
| 05/05 | Edinburgh | 60-36 | Arena Essex |
| 04/05 | Middlesbrough | 47-49 | Ipswich |
| 24/03 | Ipswich | 60-36 | Middlesbrough |

Quarter-finals

| Date | Team one | Score | Team two |
|---|---|---|---|
| 05/07 | Wimbledon | 52-44 | Ipswich |
| 04/07 | Poole | 60-36 | Eastbourne |
| 03/07 | Exeter | 58-38 | Berwick |
| 02/07 | Eastbourne | 43-53 | Poole |
| 02/07 | Edinburgh | 63-33 | Peterborough |
| 01/07 | Berwick | 58-38 | Exeter |
| 30/06 | Peterborough | 64-32 | Edinburgh |
| 22/06 | Ipswich | 48-48 | Wimbledon |
| 24/07 replay | Exeter | 52-43 | Berwick |
| 22/07 replay | Berwick | 58-38 | Exeter |

Semi-finals

| Date | Team one | Score | Team two |
|---|---|---|---|
| 15/08 | Poole | 62-33 | Wimbledon |
| 13/08 | Peterborough | 59-37 | Berwick |
| 09/08 | Wimbledon | 48-48 | Poole |
| 05/08 | Berwick | 61-35 | Peterborough |

Final

First leg

12 September 1989

| Poole Pirates Leigh Adams 14 Alun Rossiter 11 Ali Stevens 8 Tony Langdon 6 Craig Boyce 5 Gary Allan 4 Mike Lewthwaite 2 | 50 – 46 | Berwick Bandits Mark Courtney 14 David Blackburn 14 Andy Campbell 5 David Walsh 4 Rob Grant 4 Scott Robson 3 Sean Courtney 2 |

Wimborne Road

Second leg

16 September 1989

| Berwick Bandits David Blackburn 14 Mark Courtney 13 David Walsh 9 Rob Grant 9 Andy Campbell 8 Scott Robson 6 Sean Courtney 4 | 63 – 33 | Poole Pirates Leigh Adams 12 Alun Rossiter 9 Craig Boyce 6 Gary Allan 3 Tony Langdon 3 Ali Stevens 0 Mike Lewthwaite 0 |

Berrington Lough Stadium

Berwick were declared Knockout Cup Champions, winning on aggregate 109–83.

== Riders' Championship ==
Mark Loram won the Riders' Championship. The final sponsored by Jawa Moto & Barum was held on 9 September 1989 at Brandon Stadium.

| Pos. | Rider | Pts | Total |
|---|---|---|---|
| 1 | (England) Mark Loram | 2 3 3 3 3 | 14 |
| 2 | (Scotland) Kenny McKinna | 3 1 2 3 3 | 12 |
| 3 | (England) David Blackburn | 1 3 3 3 1 | 11 |
| 4 | (England) Martin Goodwin | 0 2 3 3 3 | 10 |
| 5 | (England) Steve Schofield | 2 3 0 3 2 | 10 |
| 6 | (Sweden) Richard Hellsen | 3 2 1 2 2 | 10 |
| 7 | (Australia) Mick Poole | 3 0 3 1 2 | 9 |
| 8 | (Australia) Todd Wiltshire | 0 1 2 2 3 | 8 |
| 9 | (England) Les Collins | 2 2 2 2 0 | 8 |
| 10 | (England) Nigel Crabtree | 3 2 1 1 0 | 7 |
| 11 | (Denmark) Jens Rasmussen | 0 3 0 0 2 | 5 |
| 12 | (England) Gordon Kennett | 2 0 1 1 1 | 5 |
| 13 | (Australia) Steve Regeling | 1 1 2 1 0 | 5 |
| 14 | (Denmark) Preben Eriksen | 1 1 1 0 1 | 4 |
| 15 | (Australia) Rod Hunter | 1 0 0 0 1 | 2 |
| 16 | (Australia) Leigh Adams | 0 - - - - | 0 |

== Pairs ==
The National League Pairs was held at Hackney Wick Stadium on 19 August. The event was won by Stoke Potters for the second consecutive season.

Group A
| Pos | Team | Pts | Riders |
|---|---|---|---|
| 1 | Hackney | 20 | Whittaker 12; Galvin 8 |
| 2 | Wimbledon | 13 | Morton 7 Wiltshire 6 |
| 3 | Poole | 12 | Boyce 6 Adams 6 |
| 4 | Newcastle | 9 | Carr P 6 Hunter 3 |

Group B
| Pos | Team | Pts | Riders |
|---|---|---|---|
| 1 | Edinburgh | 20 | Collins L 12; Saunders 8 |
| 2 | Berwick | 12 | Blackburn 10; Courtney 2 |
| 3 | Exeter | 12 | Green 7 Regeling 5 |
| 4 | Ipswich | 10 | Standing 6 Loram 4 |

Group C
| Pos | Team | Pts | Riders |
|---|---|---|---|
| 1 | Stoke | 18 | Monaghan 12; Crabtree 6 |
| 2 | Rye House | 13 | Rasmussen 9 Baxter 4 |
| 3 | Arena Essex | 12 | Goodwin 8 Tilbury 4 |
| 4 | Peterborough | 9 | Poole 9 Jolly 0 |

Group D
| Pos | Team | Pts | Riders |
|---|---|---|---|
| 1 | Mildenhall | 18 | Eriksen 10; Glanz 8 |
| 2 | Middlesbrough | 13 | Sumner 10; Dixon 3 |
| 3 | Eastbourne | 13 | Buck 8 Kennett 5 |
| 4 | Glasgow | 8 | McKinna 8 Lawson 0 |

Semi finals

- Stoke bt Edinburgh 6-3
- Mildenhall bt Hackney 6-3

Final

- Stoke bt Mildenhall 6-3

== Fours ==
Peterborough Panthers won the fours championship final for the second successive year, held at the East of England Arena on 23 July.

Semi finals

- SF1 = Stoke 22, Eastbourne 11, Edinburgh 10, Hackney 5
- SF2 = Peterborough 21, Exeter 12, Berwick 12, Arena Essex 3

Final

| Pos | Team | Pts | Riders |
|---|---|---|---|
| 1 | Peterborough | 15 | Barney 5, Jolly 5, Poole 3, Hodgson 2 |
| 2 | Stoke | 14 | Monaghan 5, Crabtree 4, Carr L 3, Cobby 2 |
| 3 | Exeter | 12 | Andersen 6, Cook 4, Regeling 1, Green 1 |
| 4 | Eastbourne | 7 | Buck 3, Norris 2, Kennett 1, Barker 1 |

== Leading averages ==
| Rider | Team | Average |
|---|---|---|
| Steve Schofield | Hackney | 10.50 |
| Andy Galvin | Hackney | 9.95 |
| Todd Wiltshire | Wimbledon | 9.94 |
| David Blackburn | Berwick | 9.78 |
| Nigel Crabtree | Stoke | 9.77 |
| Steve Regeling | Exeter | 9.74 |
| Kenny McKinna | Glasgow | 9.71 |
| Mark Loram | Ipswich | 9.65 |
| Chris Louis | Ipswich | 9.65 |
| Gordon Kennett | Eastbourne | 9.60 |
| Mark Courtney | Berwick | 9.52 |

== London Cup ==
Hackney won the London Cup but the competition consisted of just Wimbledon and Hackney.

Results

| Team | Score | Team |
|---|---|---|
| Wimbledon | 49–47 | Hackney |
| Hackney | 54–42 | Wimbledon |

== Riders & final averages ==
Arena Essex

- Martin Goodwin 8.47
- Rob Tilbury 8.11
- Malcolm Simmons 7.68
- Wayne Garratt 5.83
- Simon Wolstenholme 5.09
- Troy Pratt 4.53
- Ian Humphreys 3.56
- Nick Floyd 2.89

Berwick

- David Blackburn 9.78
- Mark Courtney 9.52
- Sean Courtney 7.54
- David Walsh 7.33
- Andy Campbell 7.11
- Rob Grant Sr. 6.97
- Scott Robson 5.61
- Kevin Little 1.93

Eastbourne

- Gordon Kennett 9.60
- Dean Barker 9.02
- Andy Buck 8.21
- David Norris 7.04
- Keith Pritchard 5.83
- Darren Standing 4.67
- Jon Surman 4.34
- Steve Masters 3.13
- Darren Grayling 2.57

Edinburgh

- Les Collins 9.04
- Brett Saunders 8.24
- Michael Coles 6.73
- Mick Powell 6.40
- Scott Lamb 6.16
- Lars Munkedal 5.83
- Peter McNamara 4.20
- Mark Pearce 2.29

Exeter

- Steve Regeling 9.74
- Frank Andersen 7.79
- Richard Green 7.63
- Steve Bishop 7.04
- Peter Jeffery 6.72
- Colin Cook 6.66
- Andy Sell 5.72
- Alan Rivett 5.30
- Wayne Ross 3.27
- Mark Simmonds 2.67

Glasgow

- Kenny McKinna 9.71
- Steve Lawson 8.81
- Shane Bowes 6.32
- Charlie McKinna 5.90
- Phil Jeffrey 5.42
- Martin McKinna 5.09
- Geoff Powell 4.00

Hackney

- Steve Schofield 10.50
- Andy Galvin 9.95
- Paul Whittaker 7.16
- Gary Tagg 5.37
- Barry Thomas 4.34
- Gary Rolls 4.14
- Michael Warren 3.48
- Lee Pavitt 3.13
- Warren Mowat 2.37

Ipswich

- Mark Loram 9.65
- Chris Louis 9.65
- Dean Standing 8.20
- Alan Mogridge 7.53
- Robbie Fuller 4.92
- Pete Chapman 4.90
- Kevin Teager 4.42
- Craig Hyde 2.32

Long Eaton

- Richard Hellsen 8.80
- Keith White 6.76
- Paul Fry 5.95
- Dave Perks 5.95
- Gary O'Hare 5.91
- Nigel Leaver 5.52
- Peter Lloyd 4.70
- Mark Blackbird 3.08
- Jon Roberts 2.86
- Thierry Hilaire 1.37

Middlesbrough

- Daz Sumner 8.00
- Jamie Luckhurst 7.61
- Martin Dixon 7.55
- Paul Bentley 5.67
- Steve Wilcock 5.23
- Nigel Sparshott 4.47
- Peter McNamara 4.29
- Andy Sumner 3.48
- Max Schofield 3.45
- Dave Edwards 3.22

Mildenhall

- Preben Eriksen 8.88
- Peter Glanz 7.98
- Malcolm Holloway 6.56
- Jamie Habbin 6.31
- Dave Jackson 6.30
- Spencer Timmo 4.71
- Derrol Keats 4.14
- Jonathan Cooper 3.07
- Wayne Bridgeford 3.06

Milton Keynes

- Andy Hines 6.75
- Trevor Banks 6.35
- David Clarke 5.96
- Tony Primmer 5.93
- Nigel De'ath 5.88
- Mark Lyndon 5.46
- Paul Evitts 4.82
- Paul Atkins 4.56
- Rob Fortune 4.47
- Carl Baldwin 4.09

Newcastle

- Rod Hunter 9.15
- Peter Carr 8.66
- David Clarke 5.44
- Mark Thorpe 5.17
- Simon Green 4.55
- Derek Richardson 4.37
- Gordon Whitaker 3.39
- Anthony Hulme 3.01
- Steve Wicks 2.42

Peterborough

- Mick Poole 8.81
- Kevin Jolly 8.52
- Craig Hodgson 7.55
- Ian Barney 7.27
- Scott Norman 7.14
- Nigel Flatman 6.03
- Justin Walker 5.38
- Jonathan Cooper 3.76

Poole

- Craig Boyce 9.33
- Leigh Adams 9.21
- Alun Rossiter 7.92
- Alastair Stevens 7.22
- Gary Allan 7.12
- Tony Langdon 6.77
- Kevin Smart 6.00
- Jon Surman 4.27
- Steve Leigh 3.17

Rye House

- Jens Rasmussen 9.29
- Glen Baxter 7.98
- Melvyn Taylor 7.77
- Kelvin Mullarkey 5.63
- Kevin Brice 4.61
- Jamie Fagg 4.15
- Peter Schroeck 4.04
- Carl Chalcraft 3.96
- Trevor O'Brien 3.58

Stoke

- Nigel Crabtree 9.77
- Eric Monaghan 8.75
- Louis Carr 7.29
- Chris Cobby 5.86
- Rob Woffinden 4.83
- Ian M Stead 4.71
- Ian Stead 4.50

Wimbledon

- Todd Wiltshire 9.94
- Ray Morton 8.30
- Neville Tatum 8.07
- Roger Johns 7.52
- Nathan Simpson 7.03
- Nigel Leaver 5.89
- Rodney Payne 5.24
- Scott Humphries 4.68
- Jim Dormer 3.62

== See also ==
- List of United Kingdom Speedway League Champions
- Knockout Cup (speedway)
