= 1950 Speedway National League Division Two =

British motorcycle speedway season

- League: National League Division Two
- No. of competitors: 15
- Champions: Norwich Stars
- National Trophy (Div 2 final): Halifax Dukes
- Northern Shield: Halifax Dukes
- Southern Shield: Cradley Heath
- Highest average: Jack Young
- Division/s above: National League (Div 1)
- Division/s below: National League (Div 3)

The 1950 National League Division Two was the fifth post-war season of the second tier of motorcycle speedway in Great Britain.

== Summary ==
The League was extended again to 15 teams with the promotion from Division Three of Halifax Dukes, Plymouth, Yarmouth and Hanley. Bristol Bulldogs, champions for the previous two seasons, moved up to Division One.

Norwich Stars claimed the league title by a single point, while Halifax and Cradley Heath claimed the early season Northern and Southern Shields respectively, the latter on points difference.

On 1 July 1950, two riders were killed on the same night. Jock Shead riding for Halifax Dukes was killed at The Firs Stadium, (the third rider in four years to be killed at the track) during the semi-final of the National Trophy. Shead's bike collided with another bike and he somersaulted before landing, he was take to hospital but died shortly afterwards. A second rider was killed on the same night in a division 1 fixture.

== Final table ==
Pos	Team	PL	W	D	L	Pts
1	Norwich Stars	28	18	1	9	37
2	Glasgow Tigers	28	18	0	10	36
3	Cradley Heath Heathens	28	18	0	10	36
4	Coventry Bees	28	16	0	12	32
5	Walthamstow Wolves	28	16	0	12	32
6	Halifax Dukes	28	16	0	12	32
7	Southampton Saints	28	14	1	13	29
8	Edinburgh Monarchs	28	14	1	13	29
9	Plymouth Devils	28	13	0	15	26
10	Sheffield Tars	28	13	0	15	26
11	Ashfield Giants	28	12	0	16	24
12	Yarmouth Bloaters	28	12	0	16	24
13	Newcastle Diamonds	28	10	0	18	20
14	Hanley Potters	28	9	2	17	20
15	Fleetwood Flyers	28	8	1	19	17

== Fixtures & results ==
Home \ Away	ASH	COV	CH	ED	FLE	GLA	HAL	HAN	NEW	NOR	PLY	SHE	SOT	WAL	YAR
Ashfield		44–40	35–49	45–39	35–49	37–47	33–51	46–38	51–33	38–45	52–32	55–29	58–26	56–28	47–36
Coventry	48–36		52–31	47–37	59–25	47–37	63–21	54–30	57–27	33–51	54–29	48–36	41–43	53–30	53–31
Cradley	52–32	41–43		56–28	58–26	52–32	49–35	51–33	46–37	58–26	28–56	57–27	50.5–33.5	56–28	64–20
Edinburgh	46–36	31–53	46–38		50–33	49–35	34–50	53–30	63–21	43–41	51–32	56–28	52–31	48–36	61–23
Fleetwood	37–46	34–50	37–47	42–42		40–44	39–45	50–34	54–30	47–37	46–38	54–30	39–45	40–44	57–27
Glasgow	49–35	47–36	50–34	60–24	56–28		56–28	60–23	56–28	61–23	61–23	45–39	51–33	43–41	68–16
Halifax	36–48	45–39	47–37	51–31	51–33	51–33		63–21	59–25	45–39	49–35	40–44	55–29	55–29	62–21
Hanley	44–40	43–40	34–50	48–35	38–46	38–43	43–41		55–29	42–42	60–24	54–30	42–42	49–35	53–30
Newcastle	59–25	41–42	50–34	41–43	60–23	41–43	52–32	61–22		33–51	42–41	46–38	46–38	51–33	47–37
Norwich	49–35	52–32	53–31	43–41	69–15	54–29	54–30	63–21	53.5–30.5		54–30	53–31	46–38	66–17	55–29
Plymouth	37–47	45–39	40–44	40–43	57–27	54–30	47–37	60–24	58–26	49–35		60–24	47–37	44–40	56–28
Sheffield	51–33	49–35	40–44	55–29	68–16	48–36	61–23	51–33	52–32	43–41	55–29		55–29	34–49	62–22
Southampton	51–33	44–40	52–31	46–38	56–28	56–28	40–44	62–22	53–31	41–43	50–34	63–21		46–38	61–23
Walthamstow	54–29	46–37	59–25	52–32	54–30	53–31	47–34	49–34	61–23	52–32	40–43	51–33	49–34		46–38
Yarmouth	50–34	46–38	39–45	53–31	59–25	43–31	52–32	45–38	54–30	44–40	54–30	60–24	48–36	31–51	

Legend: Blue = home team win; Yellow = draw; Red = away team win.

== Top Five Riders (League only) ==
	Rider	Nat	Team	C.M.A.
1	Jack Young	(Australia)	Edinburgh	11.24
2	Arthur Forrest	(England)	Halifax	11.00
3	Alan Hunt	(England)	Cradley Heath	10.44
4	Bob Oakley	(England)	Southampton	10.43
5	Phil Clarke	(England)	Norwich	9.91

== National Trophy Stage Two ==
The 1950 National Trophy was the 13th edition of the Knockout Cup. The Trophy consisted of three stages; stage one was for the third division clubs, stage two was for the second division clubs and stage three was for the top-tier clubs. The winner of stage one would qualify for stage two and the winner of stage two would qualify for the third and final stage. Halifax won stage two and therefore qualified for stage three.

- For Stage One - see Stage One
- For Stage Three - see Stage Three

Second Division Qualifying First round

Date	Team one	Score	Team two
26/05	Halifax	71-37	Oxford
25/05	Oxford	68-40	Halifax
27/05	Coventry	64-44	Newcastle
29/05	Newcastle	62-45	Coventry
27/05	Norwich	63-44	Fleetwood
31/05	Fleetwood	48-59	Norwich
31/05	Glasgow White City	70-38	Stoke Hanley
27/05	Stoke Hanley	65-43	Glasgow White City
30/05	Ashfield Giants	61-47	Cradley Heath
29/05	Cradley Heath	60-47	Ashfield Giants
26/05	Sheffield	77-31	Plymouth
25/05	Plymouth	56-51	Sheffield
30/05	Yarmouth	57-50	Walthamstow
29/05	Walthamstow	66-42	Yarmouth
30/05	Southampton	62-46	Edinburgh
27/05	Edinburgh	48-60	Southampton

Second Division Qualifying Second round

Date	Team one	Score	Team two
10/06	Coventry	53-53	Halifax
09/06	Halifax	68-40	Coventry
10/06	Norwich	78-30	Glasgow White City
07/06	Glasgow White City	70-38	Norwich
20/06	Ashfield Giants	63-44	Sheffield
09/06	Sheffield	57-51	Ashfield Giants
20/06	Southampton	59-49	Walthamstow
19/06	Walthamstow	67-41	Southampton

Second Division Qualifying semifinals

Date	Team one	Score	Team two
01/07	Norwich	58-50	Halifax
30/06	Halifax	69-39	Norwich
04/07	Ashfield Giants	67-41	Walthamstow
26/06	Walthamstow	66-41	Ashfield Giants

=== Second Division Qualifying final ===
Date	Team one	Score	Team two
11/07	Ashfield Giants	58-50	Halifax
14/07	Halifax	64-43	Ashfield Giants

First leg

11 July 1950

Ashfield Giants Ken Le Breton 16 Merv Harding 12 Bruce Semmens 9 Willie Wilson 7 Keith Gurtner 7 Ron Hart 4 Bill Baird 3 Bob Lovell 0	58 – 50	Halifax Dukes Arthur Forrest 12 Vic Emms 12 Al Allison 8 Dyson Harper 8 Jack Hughes 6 Ray Johnson 3 Jack Dawson 1 Bill Crosland 0

Ashfield Stadium

Second leg

14 July 1950

Halifax Dukes Arthur Forrest 15 Vic Emms 11 Al Allison 11 Jack Hughes 9 Dyson Harper 7 Bill Crosland 6 Jack Dawson 4 Ray Johnson 1	64 – 43	Ashfield Giants Ken Le Breton 17 Merv Harding 9 Bruce Semmens 7 Keith Gurtner 5 Willie Wilson 3 Ron Hart 2 Bill Baird 0 Bob Lovell 0

The Shay

== Shields ==
Southern Shield

Team	PL	W	D	L	Pts
Cradley Heath	12	8	0	4	16
Coventry	12	8	0	4	16
Walthamstow	12	7	0	5	14
Plymouth	12	6	0	6	12
Norwich	12	5	0	7	10
Southampton	12	4	0	8	8
Yarmouth	12	4	0	8	8

Northern Shield

Team	PL	W	D	L	Pts
Halifax	14	10	0	4	20
Ashfield	14	9	0	5	18
Edinburgh	14	8	1	5	17
Hanley	14	8	1	5	17
Newcastle	14	6	0	8	12
Sheffield	14	6	0	8	12
Glasgow	14	4	0	10	8
Fleetwood	14	4	0	10	8

Home \ Away	COV	CH	NOR	PLY	SOT	WAL	YAR
Coventry		47–37	50–34	53–31	48–36	57–27	55–29
Cradley	57.5–26.5		45–39	51–33	46–38	49–35	49–35
Norwich	47–37	37–46		60–24	57–27	38–46	54.5–29.5
Plymouth	55–39	37–46	48–36		54–30	58–26	63–21
Southampton	51–32	45–39	55–28	41–43		37–47	45–39
Walthamstow	41–42	60–24	57–27	51–33	49–35		56–28
Yarmouth	41–43	45–39	39–42	43–41	45–39	48–35	

Legend: Blue = home team win; Yellow = draw; Red = away team win.

Home \ Away	ASH	ED	FLE	GLA	HAL	HAN	NEW	SHE
Ashfield		33–51	58–25	44–40	41–42	50–34	57–27	43–40
Edinburgh	38–44		58–26	63–21	56–28	56–27	44–40	58–25
Fleetwood	43–39	43–41		47–37	33–49	38–46	52–32	41–42
Glasgow	41–43	47–37	55–28		51–33	34–50	41–43	47–37
Halifax	54–30	46–38	56–28	50–34		49–35	51–33	53–31
Hanley	36–47	41–41	49–34	55–29	52–31		61–23	56–28
Newcastle	38–46	48–35	54–30	56–28	49–35	41–43		50–33
Sheffield	53–31	31–53	52–32	53–31	30–54	51–33	45–39	

Legend: Blue = home team win; Yellow = draw; Red = away team win.

== Team and averages ==
Ashfield

- (Australia) Ken Le Breton 9.56
- (Australia) Merv Harding 8.61
- (England) Bruce Semmens 7.68
- (Australia) Keith Gurtner 5.91
- (England) Alec Grant 5.10
- (Scotland) Willie Wilson 6.28
- (England) Bob Lovell 4.72
- (Scotland) Larry Lazarus 2.92
- (Scotland) Bill Baird 2.91
- (England) Ernie Noakes 2.81
- (England) Norman Johnson 2.42
- (England) Geoff Godwin 2.36
- (Scotland) Eric Liddell 2.33

Coventry

- (England) Stan Williams 8.94
- (Australia) Les Hewitt 8.93
- (England) Johnny Reason 7.78
- (England) Cyril Cooper 7.70
- (England) Bob Fletcher 7.59
- (England) Derrick Tailby 7.15
- (Australia) Lionel Levy 5.74
- (England) Roy Moreton 4.41
- (England) Peter Brough 3.92

Cradley Heath

- (England) Alan Hunt 10.44
- (England) Eric Boothroyd 7.75
- (England) Brian Shepherd 7.26
- (England) Laurie Schofield 7.25
- (England) Gil Craven 6.97
- (England) Phil Malpass 6.93
- (England) Les Tolley 6.52
- (England) Bill Clifton 5.94
- (England) Harry Bastable 5.33
- (Australia) Jack Arnfield 5.14
- (England) Les Beaumont 4.67
- (Australia) Frank Young 4.35
- (England) Jim Pain 3.00

Edinburgh

- (Australia) Jack Young 11.24
- (New Zealand) Dick Campbell 8.68
- (England) Don Cuppleditch 8.00
- (England) Tommy Allott 7.09
- (England) Eddie Lack 5.49
- (England) Harold Fairhurst 5.41
- (England) Danny Lee 4.76
- (Scotland) Bob Mark 4.42
- (Australia) Clem Mitchell 4.27
- (England) Harold Booth 3.79
- (Australia) Ron Phillips 3.02

Fleetwood

- (England) Don Potter 7.60
- (England) Norman Hargreaves 7.05
- (England) Wilf Plant 6.45
- (England) Alf Parker 6.00
- (Australia) Graham Williams 5.87
- (Australia) Bill Reynolds 5.69
- (England) Dick Geary 4.27
- (Scotland) Angus McGuire 3.20
- (Australia) Frank Malouf 2.80
- (England) Geoff Culshaw 2.92

Glasgow

- (Scotland) Tommy Miller 9.78
- (Australia) Junior Bainbridge 8.68
- (Scotland) Gordon McGregor 7.57
- (Australia) Norman Lindsay 7.06
- (England) Jack Hodgson 6.87
- (England) Frank Hodgson 6.84
- (England) Joe Crowther 6.74
- (New Zealand) Peter Dykes 6.29
- (Scotland) Ken McKinlay 6.03
- (Scotland) Alf McIntosh 5.58
- (England) Johnny Green 2.26

Halifax

- (England) Arthur Forrest 11.00
- (England) Vic Emms 9.61
- (England) Jock Shead 8.40
- (England) Jack Hughes 7.04
- (England) Al Allison 6.76
- (England) Bill Crosland 6.58
- (Wales) Jack Dawson 5.03
- (England) Dyson Harper 4.20
- (England) Bunny Burrows 3.79
- (England) Ray Johnson 3.57
- (England) George Stringer 0.47

Hanley

- (Australia) Lindsay Mitchell 7.11
- (England) Brian Pritchett 7.01
- (England) Ken Adams 6.44
- (Guernsey) Johnny Fitzparick 6.34
- (England) Gil Blake 6.22
- (Australia) Bill Harris 5.41
- (England) Les Jenkins 5.04
- (England) Ray Harris 4.86
- (England) Stan Bradbury 4.00

Newcastle

- (England) Derick Close 9.79
- (England) Tommy Bateman 9.67
- (England) Frank Hodgson 7.11
- (England) Herby King 6.10
- (England) Wilf Jay 5.60
- (England) Will Lowther 5.59
- (England) Son Mitchell 5.56
- (Australia) Ernie Brecknell (Ernest Blight) 5.37
- (Australia) Don Lawson 4.24
- (England) Joe Arthur 4.00
- (England) Don Wilkinson 4.00

Norwich

- (England) Phil Clarke 9.91
- (England) Paddy Mills (Horace Burke) 7.76
- (Australia) Bob Leverenz 8.98
- (England) Jack Freeman 7.46
- (Australia) Alec Hunter 6.95
- (England) Fred Rogers 6.46
- (England) Johnny Davies 6.42
- (England) Bill Codling 5.50
- (England) Ted Bravery 5.19
- (Australia) Syd Littlewood 4.16

Plymouth

- (England) Pete Lansdale 9.48
- (England) Peter Robinson 8.68
- (England) Len Read 8.32
- (England) Alan Smith 6.27
- (England) George Wall 5.68
- (England) Johnny Bradford 5.59
- (England) Cecil Bailey 5.17
- (New Zealand) Bill Thatcher 4.96
- (England) Wally Mawdsley 2.46
- (England) Denis Hayles 2.19

Sheffield

- (England) Len Williams 8.04
- (England) Guy Allott 7.53
- (Australia) Jack Chignell 7.36
- (England) Peter Orpwood 7.28
- (England) Tommy Allott 6.75
- (New Zealand) Charlie New 6.46
- (England) Bill Dalton 6.36
- (New Zealand) Ron Johnston 6.22
- (England) Bert Lacey 5.60
- (England) Jack Winstanley 4.88
- (England) Stuart Hickman 3.33
- (England) Johnny Green 2.93
- (England) Jack Gordon 0.73

Southampton

- (England) Bob Oakley 10.43
- (England) Jimmy Squibb 8.42
- (England) Roy Craighead 8.36
- (Wales) Tom Oakley 8.23
- (England) Cecil Bailey 6.58
- (Australia) Steve Langton 6.58
- (Australia) Harold McNaughton 5.90
- (Australia) Buck Whitby 5.33
- (England) Les Wotton 5.31
- (England) Phil Bishop 5.00
- (England) Bill Holden 2.48
- (England) Bill Griffiths 2.00

Walthamstow

- (England) Jim Boyd 8.76
- (England) Benny King 7.92
- (England) Arch Windmill 7.40
- (England) Jimmy Grant 7.08
- (England) Harry Edwards 6.70
- (England) Reg Reeves 7.93
- (England) Charlie May 6.11
- (England) Dick Geary 5.74
- (England) Dick Shepherd 4.90
- (England) George Newton 4.87
- (England) Bert Edwards 3.56

Yarmouth

- (England) Reg Morgan 7.11
- (England) Fred Brand 7.00
- (England) Tip Mills 6.75
- (England) Bill Carruthers 6.41
- (Australia) Bill Maddern 5.90
- (England) Johnny White 5.66
- (Australia) Wally Higgs 5.28
- (England) Stan Page 4.74
- (England) Bert Rawlinson 4.73
- (England) George Flower 2.09

== See also ==
- List of United Kingdom Speedway League Champions
- Knockout Cup (speedway)
