= 1991 British League Division Two season =

British motorcycle speedway tier 2 league season

- League: British League Division Two
- No. of competitors: 12
- Champions: Arena Essex Hammers
- Knockout Cup: Arena Essex Hammers
- Gold Cup: Newcastle Diamonds
- Fours: Arena Essex Hammers
- Individual: Jan Stæchmann
- Highest average: Bo Petersen
- Division/s above: British League (Div 1)

The 1991 British League Division Two season (sponsored by Sunbrite) was contested as the second division of Speedway in the United Kingdom. The league had been renamed from the National League. The season saw one of the rare occasions that speedway operated a promotion/relegation system.

== Summary ==
Terry Russell and Ivan Henry purchased Arena Essex Hammers from Chick Woodroffe and they built a new team that were dominant, winning 21 of their 22 league matches, winning the Knockout Cup and claiming the fours championship held at the East of England Arena on 21 July.

Hackney Kestrels reverted to a previous name Hackney Hawks but withdrew in July, ten league matches into the season, although they did complete their Gold Cup fixtures.

== Final table ==
Pos	Team	PL	W	D	L	BP	Pts
1	Arena Essex Hammers	22	21	0	1	11	53
2	Glasgow Tigers	22	14	0	8	8	36
3	Newcastle Diamonds	22	13	1	8	8	35
4	Edinburgh Monarchs	22	12	0	10	7	31
5	Sheffield Tigers	22	12	0	10	7	31
6	Long Eaton Invaders	22	11	0	11	5	27
7	Exeter Falcons	22	9	0	13	8	26
8	Middlesbrough Bears	22	9	0	13	2	20
9	Rye House Rockets	22	8	0	14	4	20
10	Stoke Potters	22	7	2	13	2	18
11	Milton Keynes Knights	22	7	0	15	3	17
12	Peterborough Panthers	22	7	1	14	1	16

== Fixtures and results ==
Home \ Away	AE	ED	EX	GLA	LE	MID	MK	NEW	PET	RH	SHE	STO
Arena Essex		47–43	68–22	57–33	54–36	64–26	63–26	52–38	62–28	57–33	63–27	60–30
Edinburgh	32–57		64–26	54–36	46–44	62–28	57–33	44–46	51–39	54–35	49–41	63–27
Exeter	44–46	51–39		59–31	57–33	59–31	57–33	44–45	55–34	61–29	57–33	58–32
Glasgow	43–47	56–34	53–37		53–37	60–30	49–39	46–44	48–42	60–29	51–39	49–41
Long Eaton	38–52	50–40	52–38	46–44		50–40	48–42	46–43	63–27	50–40	63–27	61–29
Middlesbrough	37–53	38–52	54–36	48–42	50–40		55–35	40–47	61–29	49–41	49–41	51–39
Milton Keynes	36–54	46–44	47–43	36–54	54–34	56–33		41–48	51–38	53–37	40–50	49–41
Newcastle	40–50	42–46	46–43	46–44	50–40	45–44	46–44		61–28	49–34	41–49	55–35
Peterborough	43–47	46–44	52–38	39–51	42–47	46–44	52–38	47–42		49–41	46–44	45–45
Rye House	31–59	43–47	45–44	29–60	50–38	57–33	52–37	43–47	50–40		54–36	47–41
Sheffield	59–31	55–35	49–41	44–46	57–33	57–33	46–44	55–35	59–31	57–27		54–36
Stoke	39–51	52–38	51–38	48–42	56–34	43–47	65–25	45–45	50–40	44–46	52–38	

Legend: Blue = home team win; Yellow = draw; Red = away team win.

== British League Division Two Knockout Cup ==
The 1991 British League Division Two Knockout Cup sponsored by Phonesport, was the 24th edition of the Knockout Cup for tier two teams. Arena Essex Hammers were the winners of the competition.

First round

Team one	Team two	1st leg	2nd leg
Long Eaton	Edinburgh	54–36	45–45
Stoke	Rye House	54–36	35–54
Exeter	Newcastle	49–40	35–54
Middlesbrough	Arena Essex	51–39	36–53

Quarter-finals

Team one	Team two	1st leg	2nd leg
Glasgow	Milton Keynes	61–28	45–44
Rye House	Long Eaton	46–43	40–50
Newcastle	Hackney	52–38	44–46
Peterborough	Arena Essex	50–40	29–61

Semi-finals

Team one	Team two	1st leg	2nd leg
Arena Essex	Long Eaton	65–25	47–43
Glasgow	Newcastle	48–42	43–46

Final

First leg

9 October 1991

Glasgow Tigers Jason Lyons 11 Shane Bowes 10 Mick Powell 7 Mark Courtney 6 Steve Lawson 5 Sean Courtney 5 Brian Nixon 2	46 – 44	Arena Essex Hammers Bo Petersen 16 Brian Karger 8 Alan Mogridge 8 Troy Pratt 6 Paul Hurry 3 Colin White 2 Andy Galvin 1

Shawfield Stadium

Second leg

12 October 1991

Arena Essex Hammers Bo Petersen 12 Brian Karger 10 Troy Pratt 9 Alan Mogridge 6 Andy Galvin 4 Paul Hurry 3 Colin White 2	46 – 44	Glasgow Tigers Jason Lyons 13 Steve Lawson 12 Shane Bowes 7 Mark Courtney 5 Mick Powell 3 Brian Nixon 3 Sean Courtney 1

Arena Essex Raceway

Final tied 90–90, replay required

Final replay

First leg

19 October 1991

Arena Essex Hammers Brian Karger 14 Paul Hurry 10 Alan Mogridge 10 Andy Galvin 8 Bo Petersen 7 Troy Pratt 7 Colin White 4	60 – 30	Glasgow Tigers Steve Lawson 12 Shane Bowes 7 Jason Lyons 6 Mick Powell 2 Sean Courtney 2 Mark Courtney 1 Brian Nixon 0

Arena Essex Raceway

Second leg

20 October 1991

Glasgow Tigers Steve Lawson 14 Sean Courtney 7 Mark Courtney 7 Shane Bowes 6 Brian Nixon 6 Jason Lyons 5 Mick Powell 5	50 – 40	Arena Essex Hammers Bo Petersen 15 Brian Karger 14 Andy Galvin 5 Paul Hurry 3 Troy Pratt 1 Alan Mogridge 1 Colin White 1

Shawfield Stadium

Arena Essex were declared Knockout Cup Champions, winning on aggregate 100–80.

== Gold Cup ==
South Group

Pos	Team	P	W	D	L	Pts
1	Peterborough	10	6	1	3	13
2	Arena Essex	10	7	0	3	14
3	Exeter	10	5	0	5	10
4	Milton Keynes	10	5	0	5	10
5	Hackney	10	3	1	6	7
6	Rye House	10	2	0	8	4

North Group

Pos	Team	P	W	D	L	Pts
1	Newcastle	12	7	1	4	15
2	Long Eaton	12	7	1	4	15
3	Edinburgh	12	6	1	5	13
4	Stoke	12	6	0	6	12
5	Sheffield	12	5	1	5	11
6	Middlesbrough	12	5	0	7	10
7	Glasgow	12	4	0	8	8

South

Home \ Away	AE	EX	HAC	MK	PET	RH
Arena Essex		46–44	46–44	51–39	57–29	53–37
Exeter	63–27		60–30	57–33	47–43	58–32
Hackney	40–50	40–38		54–36	45–45	52–37
Milton Keynes	49–41	55–35	58–32		49–41	46–44
Peterborough	65–24	49–40	50–37	49–41		66–24
Rye House	44–46	50–40	46–44	51–39	44–46	

Legend: Blue = home team win; Yellow = draw; Red = away team win.

North

Home \ Away	ED	GLA	LE	MID	NEW	SHE	STO
Edinburgh		46–43	52–38	52–37	45–45	47–43	51–39
Glasgow	53–36		42–47	60–30	42–47	52–38	61–29
Long Eaton	53.5–36.5	56–34		46–44	46–44	54–36	44–46
Middlesbrough	45–43	57–33	50–39		49–41	44–46	57–33
Newcastle	43–47	47–43	48–42	53–37		47–42	43–47
Sheffield	48–42	45–44	45–45	56–34	42–47		47–43
Stoke	52–38	49–40	44–46	53–37	42–47	53–37	

Legend: Blue = home team win; Yellow = draw; Red = away team win.

Final

Team one	Team two	1st leg	2nd leg
Peterborough	Newcastle	51–39	38—52

Newcastle won 91–89 on aggregate.

== Riders' Championship ==
Jan Stæchmann won the Riders' Championship. The final sponsored by Jawa Moto & Barum was held on 14 September at Brandon Stadium.

Pos.	Rider	Pts	Total
1	(Denmark) Jan Stæchmann	3 2 3 3 3	14+3
2	(New Zealand) David Bargh	3 3 3 2 3	14+2
3	(Australia) Troy Butler	3 3 3 0 3	12
4	(England) Les Collins	2 3 1 3 2	11
5	(England) Neil Evitts	3 3 2 1 2	11
6	(New Zealand) Mark Thorpe	f 2 3 2 2	9
7	(Australia) Steve Regeling	2 1 0 3 2	8
8	(Australia) Stephen Davies	2 0 2 2 1	7
9	(Scotland) Kenny McKinna	0 2 0 3 1	6
10	(Denmark) Bo Petersen	1 2 2 ef fex	5
11	(England) Carl Blackbird	1 1 1 1 0	4
12	(England) Eric Monaghan	0 0 1 2 1	4
13	(England) Steve Lawson	1 0 0 1 1	3
14	(Australia) Shane Bowes	2 0 1 tex r	3
15	(England) Peter Carr	1 1 2 1 0	5
16	(England) Melvyn Taylor	0 1 0 0 3	4
17	(England) Chris Clarence (res)	0	0

- f=fell, r-retired, ex=excluded, ef=engine failure t=touched tapes

== Fours ==
Arena Essex Hammers won the fours championship final, held at the East of England Arena on 21 July.

Final

Pos	Team	Pts	Riders
1	Arena Essex	32	Karger 9, Petersen 9
2	Edinburgh	15+	Saunders 6 Collins L 5, Coles 2, Walker 2
3	Long Eaton	15	Blackbird C 4, Steachmann 4, O'Hare
4	Milton Keynes	10	Butler 6 Keats 2

- Edinburgh awarded 2nd on race wins.

== Leading averages ==
Rider	Team	Average
Bo Petersen	Arena Essex	10.54
Brian Karger	Arena Essex	10.23
Mark Thorpe	Newcastle	9.93
Neil Evitts	Sheffield	9.79
Mikael Blixt	Peterborough	9.69
David Bargh	Newcastle	9.55
Andy Grahame	Wimbledon	9.44
Jan Stæchmann	Long Eaton	9.39
Peter Carr	Sheffield	9.36
Troy Butler	Milton Keynes	9.26

== Riders and final averages ==
Arena Essex Hammers

- Bo Petersen 10.54
- Brian Karger 10.23
- Alan Mogridge 8.85
- Troy Pratt 7.45
- Andy Galvin 7.43
- Jan Pedersen 6.87
- Paul Hurry 5.59
- Colin White 5.45
- Robert Ledwith 5.25
- Tommy Palmer 1.54

Edinburgh

- Les Collins 9.10
- Michael Coles 7.97
- Frede Schott 7.79
- Brett Saunders 7.49
- Nigel Alderton 5.55
- David Steen 4.98
- Johnny Jorgensen 4.74
- Justin Walker 4.62

Exeter

- Steve Regeling 8.74
- Peter Jeffery 8.08
- Richard Green 7.80
- David Smart 7.49
- Colin Cook 6.48
- Richard Knight 5.29
- Mark Simmonds 5.20
- Justin Elkins 3.45
- Frank Smart 3.20

Glasgow

- Steve Lawson 8.44
- Shane Bowes 8.38
- Jason Lyons 7.82
- Mark Courtney 7.21
- Sean Courtney 6.76
- Mick Powell 6.21
- Brian Nixon 4.55

Hackney (withdrew from league)

- Paul Whittaker 8.74
- Tony Olsson 7.79
- Dave Hamnett 6.57
- Vladimir Kalina 5.81
- Michael Warren 5.38
- Richard Hellsen 5.13
- Pavel Karnas 4.36
- Roland Pollard 2.25
- Tim Hunter 2.21

Long Eaton

- Jan Stæchmann 9.39
- Carl Blackbird 8.73
- Kai Niemi 6.67
- Gary O'Hare 5.66
- Mark Blackbird 5.64
- Peter McNamara 5.32
- Rob Tilbury 4.74
- Stuart Parnaby 2.69

Middlesbrough

- Kenny McKinna 8.00
- Steve Wilcock 6.88
- Lars Munkedal 6.18
- Mark Lemon 6.04
- Duncan Chapman 5.26
- Wayne Carter 5.25
- Shawn Venables 4.55
- Carsten Pelzmann 4.52
- Chris Readshaw 2.87

Milton Keynes

- Troy Butler 9.26
- Jan Pedersen 7.93
- Paul Woods 5.80
- Peter Glanz 5.56
- Jamie Habbin 5.37
- Nigel De'ath 5.23
- Justin Walker 4.77
- Derrol Keats 3.78
- Paul Blackbird 1.82

Newcastle

- Mark Thorpe 9.93
- David Bargh 9.55
- Scott Lamb 7.32
- Martin Dixon 6.23
- Dave Hamnett 5.96
- Peter Jeffery 5.03
- Richard Juul 4.03
- Jamie Habbin 3.91
- Max Schofield 2.76

Peterborough

- Mikael Blixt 9.69
- Stephen Davies 8.14
- Richard Hellsen 7.44
- Scott Norman 6.12
- Mark Lyndon 6.10
- Kevin Jolly 5.75
- Gary Tagg 5.14
- Robbie Fuller 4.06
- Roger Horspool 3.18
- Tim Hunter 3.14

Rye House

- Martin Goodwin 8.51
- Jens Rasmussen 7.82
- Trevor O'Brien 7.58
- Melvyn Taylor 7.43
- Roger Johns 5.44
- Rob Tilbury 4.41
- Wayne Baxter 3.73
- John Wainwright 3.40

Sheffield

- Neil Evitts 9.79
- Peter Carr 9.36
- Louis Carr 7.72
- Ian Barney 7.51
- Richard Musson 4.65
- Simon Wolstenholme 4.57
- Mark Hepworth 4.23
- Richard Davidson 4.08
- Ade Hoole 3.18

Stoke

- Nigel Crabtree 8.30
- Eric Monaghan 8.07
- Gary Chessell 6.96
- Darren Standing 5.94
- David Clarke 5.58
- Garry Stead 5.08
- Chris Cobby 4.87

== See also ==
- List of United Kingdom Speedway League Champions
- Knockout Cup (speedway)
