= 1986 National League season =

British speedway season

- League: National League
- No. of competitors: 20
- Champions: Eastbourne Eagles
- Knockout Cup: Eastbourne Eagles
- Individual: Paul Thorp
- Pairs: Edinburgh Monarchs
- Fours: Middlesbrough Tigers
- London Cup: Hackney Hawks
- Highest average: Dave Jessup
- Division/s above: 1986 British League

The 1986 National League was contested as the second division of motorcycle speedway in the United Kingdom.

== Summary ==
The title was won by the Eastbourne Eagles.

== Final table ==
Pos	Team	PL	W	D	L	Pts
1	Eastbourne Eagles	38	28	1	9	57
2	Poole Wildcats	38	25	1	12	51
3	Middlesbrough Tigers	38	25	1	12	51
4	Arena Essex Hammers	38	23	1	14	47
5	Stoke Potters	38	23	0	15	46
6	Wimbledon Dons	38	21	1	16	43
7	Mildenhall Fen Tigers	37	21	1	15	43
8	Milton Keynes Knights	37	20	1	16	41
9	Edinburgh Monarchs	38	19	0	19	38
10	Peterborough Panthers	38	18	2	18	38
11	Rye House Rockets	38	18	0	20	36
12	Boston Barracudas	38	17	1	20	35
13	Hackney Kestrels	38	16	0	22	32
14	Berwick Bandits	38	15	1	22	31
15	Canterbury Crusaders	38	15	1	22	31
16	Exeter Falcons	38	15	0	23	30
17	Birmingham Brummies	38	14	1	23	29
18	Glasgow Tigers	38	14	0	24	28
19	Newcastle Federation Specials	38	13	1	24	27
20	Long Eaton Invaders	38	11	2	25	24

== Fixtures and results ==
Home \ Away	AE	BER	BIR	BOS	CAN	EAS	ED	EX	GLA	HAC	LE	MID	MIL	MK	NEW	PET	PP	RH	STO	WIM
Arena Essex		42–34	57–21	40–38	46–32	40–37	41–37	46–32	44–34	50–28	44–34	36–41	45–33	42–36	51.5–25.5	44–34	45–32	44–34	43–33	39–39
Berwick	36–42		50–27	37–40	51–27	40–38	35–43	52–26	54–24	50–27	53–25	45–31	36–42	47–31	41–36	50–28	42–24	51–27	45–33	38–40
Birmingham	43–35	38–39		43–35	37–41	30–48	41–37	46–32	49–29	38–39	40–38	41–37	39–39	48–30	42–36	45–33	40–38	42–36	40–38	43–35
Boston	49–29	50–28	48–30		45–33	45–33	41–37	48–30	43–35	38–39	47–31	36–42	38–40	36–42	47–31	41–37	42–36	47–31	45–33	51–27
Canterbury	44–34	40–38	53–25	35–43		33–45	42–36	38–40	51–27	40–38	49–29	40–38	43–35	35–42	45–33	39–39	36–42	36–41	40–38	49–29
Eastbourne	47–31	58–20	47–31	50–28	46–32		47–31	59–19	54–24	46–32	57–21	39–39	44–34	54–24	52–26	54–23	51–27	41–37	42–36	42–36
Edinburgh	41–36	42–36	57–21	45–33	46–32	37–40		55–23	47–31	45–33	52–26	39–37	40–38	50–28	42–36	42–36	37–41	48–29	36–42	44–34
Exeter	37–41	48–29	53–25	50–28	37–41	38–40	40–38		59–19	45–33	54–23	46–32	39–38	40–37	51–27	36–42	38–40	50–28	37–41	40–37
Glasgow	42–35	40–38	48–30	39–37	45–33	37–41	40–38	50–28		44–34	44–33	35–42	41–37	47–31	43–34	40–36	36–42	36–42	44–34	37–41
Hackney	33–44	43–35	54–23	44–33	51–27	37–41	37–40	52–25	49–28		44–34	42–36	39–38	38–40	45–33	41–37	37–40	43–35	38–40	49–28
Long Eaton	41–36	39–39	40–38	44–33	37–41	32–46	43–35	45–32	53–24	35–42		34–44	65–0	41–37	41–37	39.5–37.5	39–39	37–40	40–38	33–45
Middlesbrough	41–37	44–34	47–31	44–33	48–30	44–33	49–29	50–28	43–35	56–22	39–38		45–33	56–22	40–37	50–28	41–37	50–28	43–35	50–28
Mildenhall	40–38	48–30	49–28	42–36	47–31	42–36	44–34	50–28	53–25	43–35	47–31	42–35		44–34	47–31	40–38	38–39	51–24	42–36	44–34
Milton Keynes	37–41	40–38	47–31	39–39	52–26	30–48	48–28	44–34	51–27	46–32	46–32	40–38	–		50–28	44–34	40–38	42–36	45–33	47–31
Newcastle	41–37	52–26	43–35	43–35	44–34	28–50	41–37	38–40	52–26	51–27	45–33	54–23	44–34	38–40		38–38	41–37	48–30	34–44	33–45
Peterborough	49–29	41–37	a–a	37–41	43–35	42–36	40–38	56–22	57–21	41–37	51–27	41–37	43–35	38–40	54–24		41–37	41–36	40–38	42–36
Poole	46–32	47–31	46–32	42–36	55–23	44–34	46–32	46–32	58–20	51–27	52–26	53–25	44–34	51–26	44–34	44–34		60–17	41–36	41–37
Rye House	37–41	42–36	44–31	45–33	40–38	36–42	42–36	37–24	42–36	41–37	45–31	38–40	34–44	45–33	40–38	46–32	42–35		42–36	40–38
Stoke	49–28	49–29	58–19	44–34	50–28	43–35	46–32	53–25	55–22	51–26	49–29	38–40	45–33	45–33	48–30	49–28	45–33	51–26		54–24
Wimbledon	37–41	47–31	47–30	47–31	45–33	43–35	45–33	44–34	54–23	49–29	57–21	40–37	47–31	44–33	44–34	48–30	42–36	44–32	36–42	

Legend: Blue = home team win; Yellow = draw; Red = away team win.

a=Peterborough awarded win

== National League Knockout Cup ==
The 1986 National League Knockout Cup was the 19th edition of the Knockout Cup for tier two teams. Eastbourne Eagles were the winners of the competition for the second successive year.

First round

Date	Team one	Score	Team two
12/05	Newcastle	43-35	Boston
10/05	Canterbury	53-25	Birmingham
02/05	Glasgow	37-41	Edinburgh
30/04	Edinburgh	53-25	Glasgow
27/04	Boston	37-41	Newcastle
27/04	Rye House	55-23	Exeter
25/04	Birmingham	48-30	Canterbury
21/04	Exeter	37-41	Rye House

Second round

Date	Team one	Score	Team two
08/07	Milton Keynes	43-35	Mildenhall
07/07	Newcastle	36-42	Berwick
06/07	Eastbourne	48-30	Wimbledon
06/07	Mildenhall	49-29	Milton Keynes
05/07	Canterbury	39-39	Peterborough
04/07	Peterborough	49-29	Canterbury
03/07	Middlesbrough	49-29	Stoke
02/07	Long Eaton	43-35	Edinburgh
02/07	Wimbledon	36-42	Eastbourne
29/06	Rye House	42-35	Hackney
28/06	Berwick	50-28	Newcastle
28/06	Stoke	40-37	Middlesbrough
27/06	Edinburgh	50-28	Long Eaton
27/06	Hackney	48-30	Rye House
15/05	Arena	45-33	Poole
29/04	Poole	36-42	Arena Essex

Quarter-finals

Date	Team one	Score	Team two
28/08	Middlesbrough	36-42	Mildenhall
22/08	Peterborough	45-33	Berwick
17/08	Mildenhall	43-35	Middlesbrough
09/08	Berwick	42-36	Peterborough
01/08	Edinburgh	38-40	Eastbourne
01/08	Hackney	39-39	Arena Essex
27/07	Eastbourne	48-28	Edinburgh
17/07	Arena Essex	43-35	Hackney

Semi-finals

Date	Team one	Score	Team two
17/10	Peterborough	37-41	Eastbourne
28/09	Mildenhall	44-34	Arena Essex
21/09	Eastbourne	49.5-28.5	Peterborough
18/09	Arena Essex	43-35	Mildenhall

=== Final ===
First leg

26 October 1986

Eastbourne Eagles Gordon Kennett 13 Martin Dugard 12 Dean Standing 11 Keith Pritchard 9 Andy Buck 6 Chris Mulvihill 0 Colin Richardson R/R	51 – 25	Mildenhall Fen Tigers Melvyn Taylor 11 Dave Jessup 7 Kelvin Mullarkey 3 Eric Monaghan 2 Lee Potter 2 Rob Parish 0 Robert McNamara 0

Arlington Stadium

Second leg

2 November 1986

Mildenhall Fen Tigers Melvyn Taylor 12 Eric Monaghan 8 Kelvin Mullarkey 7 Lee Potter 6 Rob Parish 4 Robert McNamara Wayne Dunworth 1	39 – 39	Eastbourne Eagles Martin Dugard 8 Dean Standing 8 Gordon Kennett 7 Andy Buck 6 Keith Pritchard 5 Steve Chambers 3 Dean Barker 2

Mildenhall Stadium

Eastbourne were declared Knockout Cup Champions, winning on aggregate 90–64.

== Riders' Championship ==
Paul Thorp won the Riders' Championship. The final was held on 30 August at Brandon Stadium.

Pos.	Rider	Pts	Total
1	(England) Paul Thorp	3 3 3 3 3	15
2	(England) Steve Schofield	3 3 3 3 1	13
3	(England) Les Collins	2 2 3 2 3	12
4	(England) Andrew Silver	3 3 2 2 ret	10
5	(England) Malcolm Simmons	0 3 2 3 2	10
6	(England) Jamie Luckhurst	2 0 1 3 3	9
7	(England) Kevin Jolly	1 1 3 2 2	9
8	(England) Gordon Kennett	1 2 1 1 3	8
9	(England) Mark Courtney	ef 1 2 2 1	6
10	(Australia) Mark Fiora	3 0 2 1 ex	6
11	(England) Steve McDermott	1 2 0 0 2	5
12	(England) Dave Mullett	2 1 0 0 2	5
13	(England) Dave Jessup	2 1 1 ef x	4
14	(England) Paul Woods	ef 2 0 1 1	4
15	(England) Steve Lawson	1 0 1 0 0	2
16	(England) Kevin Hawkins	0 0 0 1 0	1
17	(New Zealand) Bruce Cribb (res)	1	1

- f=fell, r-retired, ex=excluded, ef=engine failure

== Pairs ==
The National League Pairs was held at Hackney Wick Stadium on 13 July and was won by Edinburgh Monarchs.

Final

- Edinburgh (Collins & Wyer) bt Hackney (Thomas & Galvin) 6-3

== Fours ==
Middlesbrough Tigers won the fours championship final, held at the East of England Arena on 10 August.

Semi finals

- SF1 = Arena Essex 18, Mildenhall 12, Edinburgh 11, Eastbourne 7
- SF2 = Middlesbrough 15, Hackney 13, Stoke 11, Poole 9

Final

Pos	Team	Pts	Riders
1	Middlesbrough Tigers	15	Burdfield 5, Courtney 4, Dixon 4, Wilcock 2
2	Arena Essex Hammers	14	Silver 6, Middleditch 4, Goodwin 3, Smart 1
3	Hackney Kestrels	11	Simmons 5, Galvin 4, Whittaker 1, Rolls 1
4	Mildenhall Fen Tigers	8	Monaghan 3, Henry 2, Taylor 2, Jessup 1

== Leading averages ==
Rider	Team	Average
Dave Jessup	Mildenhall	10.69
Paul Thorp	Stoke	10.44
Andrew Silver	Arena Essex	10.40
Steve Schofield	Poole	10.36
Les Collins	Edinburgh	10.14
Nigel Crabtree	Stoke	9.98
Kevin Jolly	Boston	9.90
Gordon Kennett	Eastbourne	9.87
Jamie Luckhurst	Wimbledon	9.83
Martin Dugard	Eastbourne	9.75
Malcolm Simmons	Hackney	9.70

== London Cup ==
Hackney won the London Cup but the competition consisted of just Wimbledon and Hackney.

Results

Team	Score	Team
Hackney	43–35	Wimbledon
Wimbledon	42–35	Hackney

== Riders & final averages ==
Arena Essex

- Andrew Silver 10.40
- Neil Middleditch 9.56
- Martin Goodwin 8.87
- David Smart 6.46
- Pete Chapman 5.27
- Gary Chessell 5.17
- Lawrie Bloomfield 4.69
- Sean Barker 2.60
- Paul Muchene 2.16

Berwick

- Charlie McKinna 8.32
- Steve McDermott 8.15
- Jimmy McMillan 7.68
- Steve Finch 7.47
- Rob Grant Sr. 6.67
- Sean Courtney 5.91
- Roger Lambert 5.30
- Paul McHale 3.69
- Wayne Ross 3.48

Birmingham

- Paul Evitts 9.12
- David Cheshire 7.59
- Reg Wilson 7.53
- Phil White 6.45
- Rob Woffinden 5.85
- Ian Stead 5.66
- Ian M Stead 5.48
- Mark Stevenson 4.75
- Steve Finch 4.14
- Wayne Elliott 2.42
- David Rose 1.95

Boston

- Kevin Jolly 9.90
- Andy Hines 8.54
- Paul Clarke 7.27
- Rob Woffinden 6.19
- Dave Jackson 5.66
- Andy Fisher 4.88
- Peter Framingham 4.67
- Wayne Ross 3.89
- Derrol Keats 3.64
- Gary Clegg 3.36

Canterbury

- Dave Mullett 8.69
- Mike Spink 7.60
- Alan Mogridge 7.34
- Rob Tilbury 6.06
- Alan Sage 4.88
- Steve Bryenton 4.52
- Tony Hansford 3.10
- Paul Hilton 2.86
- Gary Hopkins 1.60

Eastbourne

- Gordon Kennett 9.87
- Martin Dugard 9.75
- Colin Richardson 8.06
- Keith Pritchard 7.22
- Andy Buck 7.08
- Dean Standing 7.06
- Chris Mulvihill 4.19
- Dean Barker 3.11

Edinburgh

- Les Collins 10.14
- Doug Wyer 9.13
- Dave Trownson 7.16
- Brett Saunders 6.13
- Mark Burrows 5.08
- Phil Jeffrey 4.67
- Scott Lamb 4.61

Exeter

- Bruce Cribb 8.23
- Alan Rivett 7.80
- Colin Cook 7.60
- Steve Bishop 7.05
- Kevin Price 6.13
- Alan Mason 5.28
- Michael Coles 5.04
- Tony Mattingley 4.34
- Andy Sell 4.10
- Dave Roberts 3.35
- Mike Semmonds 3.02
- Stuart Williams 1.60

Glasgow

- Steve Lawson 9.11
- Bobby Beaton 8.16
- Martin McKinna 6.12
- Jacko Irving 4.81
- Geoff Powell 4.50
- Kym Mauger 4.38
- Derek Cooper 4.15
- Colin Caffrey 3.68
- Jim Beaton 3.05
- Kenny Brailsford 2.71

Hackney

- Malcolm Simmons 9.70
- Andy Galvin 7.95
- Barry Thomas 7.39
- Alan Mogridge 6.67
- Paul Whittaker 6.28
- Gary Rolls 4.07
- Carl Chalcraft 3.91
- Richard Pettman 3.78
- Mike Fitzpatrick 3.62
- Steve Smith 1.56

Long Eaton

- Mark Fiora 9.18
- Miles Evans 6.94
- Gerald Short 6.86
- Geoff Pusey 5.19
- John Proctor 4.81
- Phil Alderman 4.63
- Glenn Doyle 4.29
- Pete Smith 3.53
- Eric Broadbelt 3.15
- Kenny Young 2.10

Middlesbrough

- Martin Dixon 9.30
- Mark Courtney 9.21
- Gary Havelock 8.64
- Steve Wilcock 7.98
- Jim Burdfield 5.27
- Tony Forward 4.30
- Roland Tebbs 4.30
- Glenn Hornby 3.74

Mildenhall

- Dave Jessup 10.69
- Melvyn Taylor 9.11
- Eric Monaghan 7.62
- Robert Henry 7.04
- Richard Green 5.19
- Rob Parish 4.06
- Kelvin Mullarkey 3.73
- Lee Potter 3.06
- Wayne Dunworth 1.55
- Andy Steward 1.41

Milton Keynes

- Keith White 8.40
- Trevor Banks 8.02
- Kevin Smart 7.65
- Ian Clark 6.48
- Mark Carlson 5.32
- Derek Richardson 5.31
- Mark Chessell 4.64
- Peter Lloyd 4.50

Newcastle

- Dave Morton 8.24
- Paul Stead 7.45
- David Blackburn 7.07
- Dave Perks 6.27
- Gary O'Hare 5.95
- Bernie Collier 4.70
- Paul Cooper 4.34
- Keith Bloxsome 2.37
- Steve Wicks 2.00

Peterborough

- Kevin Hawkins 8.75
- Nigel Flatman 8.16
- Dave Allen 7.00
- Carl Baldwin 7.00
- Ian Barney 6.43
- Pete Chapman 5.79
- Jamie Habbin 5.01
- Adrian Hume 4.71
- John Stokes 4.31

Poole

- Steve Schofield 10.36
- Kevin Smith 9.45
- Martin Yeates 8.70
- David Biles 7.75
- Marcus Bisson 5.06
- Dave Gibbs 4.55
- Wayne Barrett 4.14
- Will James 2.42

Rye House

- Paul Woods 8.97
- Alan Mogridge 7.53
- Alastair Stevens 7.47
- Paul Bosley 6.02
- Kevin Brice 5.47
- Bobby Garrad 5.42
- Julian Parr 5.02
- Linden Warner 4.61
- Colin Lambkin 0.63

Stoke

- Paul Thorp 10.44
- Nigel Crabtree 9.98
- Tom Owen 7.34
- Mike Wilding 7.0
- Darren Sumner 7.06
- Graham Jones 5.70
- Nigel Harrhy .4.27
- Mark Crang 3.93
- Jamie Young 2.24

Wimbledon

- Jamie Luckhurst 9.83
- Roger Johns 9.25
- Nigel Sparshott 6.92
- Neville Tatum 6.74
- Jeremy Luckhurst 6.04
- Terry Mussett .4.50
- Mark Fordham 3.54
- Mark Baldwin 3.32
- Jay Pleece 1.26

== See also ==
- List of United Kingdom Speedway League Champions
- Knockout Cup (speedway)
