= Willie Wilson (speedway rider) =

British motorcycle speedway rider (1923 – 2016)

- Born: 8 September 1923; Kilbirnie, Scotland
- Died: 10 September 2016 (aged 93); Kilbirnie, Scotland
- Nationality: British (Scottish)

Career history
- 1949–1952: Ashfield Giants
- 1953–1954: Belle Vue Aces

William Wilson (8 September 1923 – 10 September 2016) was a motorcycle speedway rider from Scotland. He earned 12 international caps for the Scotland national speedway team.

== Biography ==
Wilson, born in Kilbirnie, Scotland, began speedway under the tutelage of Ken Le Breton during the second half of 1948. His British leagues career started when riding for Ashfield Giants during the 1949 Speedway National League Division Two season.

Wilson remained with Ashfield for four seasons from 1949 to 1952, where he rode for the promoter Johnnie Hoskins. As an Ashfield rider, he reached the final of the National Trophy in 1950 and topped the team's averages in 1952, when hitting a season average of 8.29. Wilson also reached the Championship round of the 1952 Individual Speedway World Championship and became the club captain.

Following the closure of Ashfield in 1953, Wilson followed his promoter Johnnie Hoskins to Belle Vue Aces after signing for £1500. He did not enjoy his time in Manchester and wished for a return to Glasgow. He would ride a few meetings for Scottish representative sides in 1955 and 1956 but decided to retire at the end of 1956.
