= Stefan Ekberg =

Swedish speedway rider

- Born: 21 January 1972 (age 54); Motala, Sweden
- Nationality: Swedish

Career history

Sweden
- 1989-1991, 1995: Skepparna/Västervik
- 1992-1994: Filbyterna
- 1996: Dackarna
- 1997: Team Svelux
- 1998-1999, 2001: Vargarna
- 1999-2004: Piraterna
- 2002, 2004: Örnarna
- 2005: VMS Elit
- 2005: Lejonen

Great Britain
- 1994: Oxford Cheetahs
- 1995: Eastbourne Eagles
- 2005: Glasgow Tigers
- 2007-2008, 2010: Rye House Rockets

Team honours
- 1990, 2003: Swedish Allsvenskan Winner
- 2005: Elite League Champion
- 2007: Premier League Champion

Stefan Ekberg (born 21 January 1972 in Motala, Sweden) is a former international motorcycle speedway rider from Sweden.

== Career ==
Ekberg is a full Swedish international, making his debut in 1994. He rode in the British leagues, starting with Oxford Cheetahs for the 1994 season. The following season he was subject to an attempt to sign him by King's Lynn Stars but joined Eastbourne Eagles, where he won the Elite League Championship in 1995. However, despite helping the Eagles to success he was released the following season.

Ekberg returned to the British Premier League with the Glasgow Tigers after a ten-year absence in 2005. In 2007, the Rye House Rockets signed Ekberg mid season to replace the injured Stuart Robson and the Rockets went on to become Premier League champions that season. He was retained by promoter Len Silver for 2008.
