= David McAllan =

- Born: 20 June 1980 (age 46); Edinburgh, Scotland
- Nationality: British (Scottish)

Career history
- 1996–1998, 2001: Berwick Bandits
- 1997, 2002: Sheffield Tigers
- 1998: Newcastle Diamonds
- 1999, 2005: Edinburgh Monarchs
- 1999: Linlithgow Lightning
- 2000: Stoke Potters
- 2000: Ashfield Giants
- 2001, 2003–2005: Boston Barracudas
- 2005: Sittingbourne Crusaders

Individual honours
- 1997: Scottish Jnr Champion
- 1999: Golden Helmet Winner
- 1999: Linlithgow Riders Champion
- 1997: British Under 21 Finalist
- 2005: British Finalist

Team honours
- 1999: KO Cup winner

David John McAllan (born 20 June 1980 in Edinburgh, Scotland) is a former professional motorcycle speedway rider from Scotland.

== Career ==
McAllan at the age of 15, first rode in the British leagues for Berwick Bandits in the 1996 Speedway Conference League. The Berwickshire High School pupil was able to obtain a licence because the rules had been changed that year, reducing the minimum age from 16 to 15.

McAllan has represented Scotland at international level and is a former Scottish Junior Champion. In 2000, he broke a bone in his back while riding for Stoke Potters and this followed on from knee surgery.

McAllan was unable to ride following an accident which almost paralysed him at Ashfield Stadium in 2007 while riding for Glasgow Tigers.
