= Stanisław Burza =

Polish speedway rider

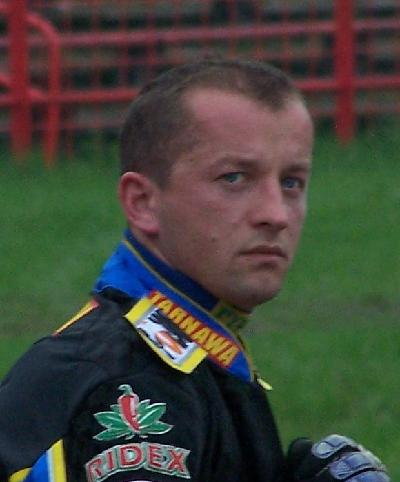
- Born: 26 September 1977 (age 49); Tuchów, Poland
- Nationality: Polish

Career history

Poland
- 1998-2006: Tarnów
- 2007: Gniezno
- 2008-2010, 2015: Łódź
- 2011: Rivne
- 2012, 2016, 2019: Kraków
- 2013-2014: Opole
- 2017: Lublin
- 2018: Krosno
- 2020: Rzeszów

Great Britain
- 2006-2007, 2009: Berwick Bandits
- 2006: Oxford Cheetahs
- 2007-2008: Coventry Bees
- 2008: Belle Vue Aces

Individual honours
- 2006: Scottish Open Champion

Team honours
- 2004, 2005: Polish Championship
- 2007: Elite League Championship

Stanisław Burza (born 26 September 1977 in Tuchów, Poland), nicknamed "Stan Storm", is a former motorcycle speedway rider from Poland.

== Career ==
Burza is a 2004 and 2005 Team Polish Champion. In 2006, he was signed by Oxford Cheetahs.

== Family ==
Burza and his wife, Małgorzata, have one daughter, Justyna (born 2006). The Polish word burza means 'thunderstorm'.

== Results ==
=== Domestic competitions ===
- Individual Polish Championship
  - 2003 - Bydgoszcz - 10th place
  - 2009 - 11th place in Quarter-Final 4
- Team Polish Championship
  - 2004 - Polish Champion with Tarnów
  - 2005 - Polish Champion with Tarnów
  - 2006 - 4th place with Tarnów
- Team British Championship (Elite League)
  - 2007 - Elite League Champion

== World Longtrack Championship ==
=== Grand=Prix Series ===
- 2013 1 app (21st) 15pts

== See also ==
- Speedway in Poland
