= Johnnie Hoskins =

Speedway promoter (1892–1987)

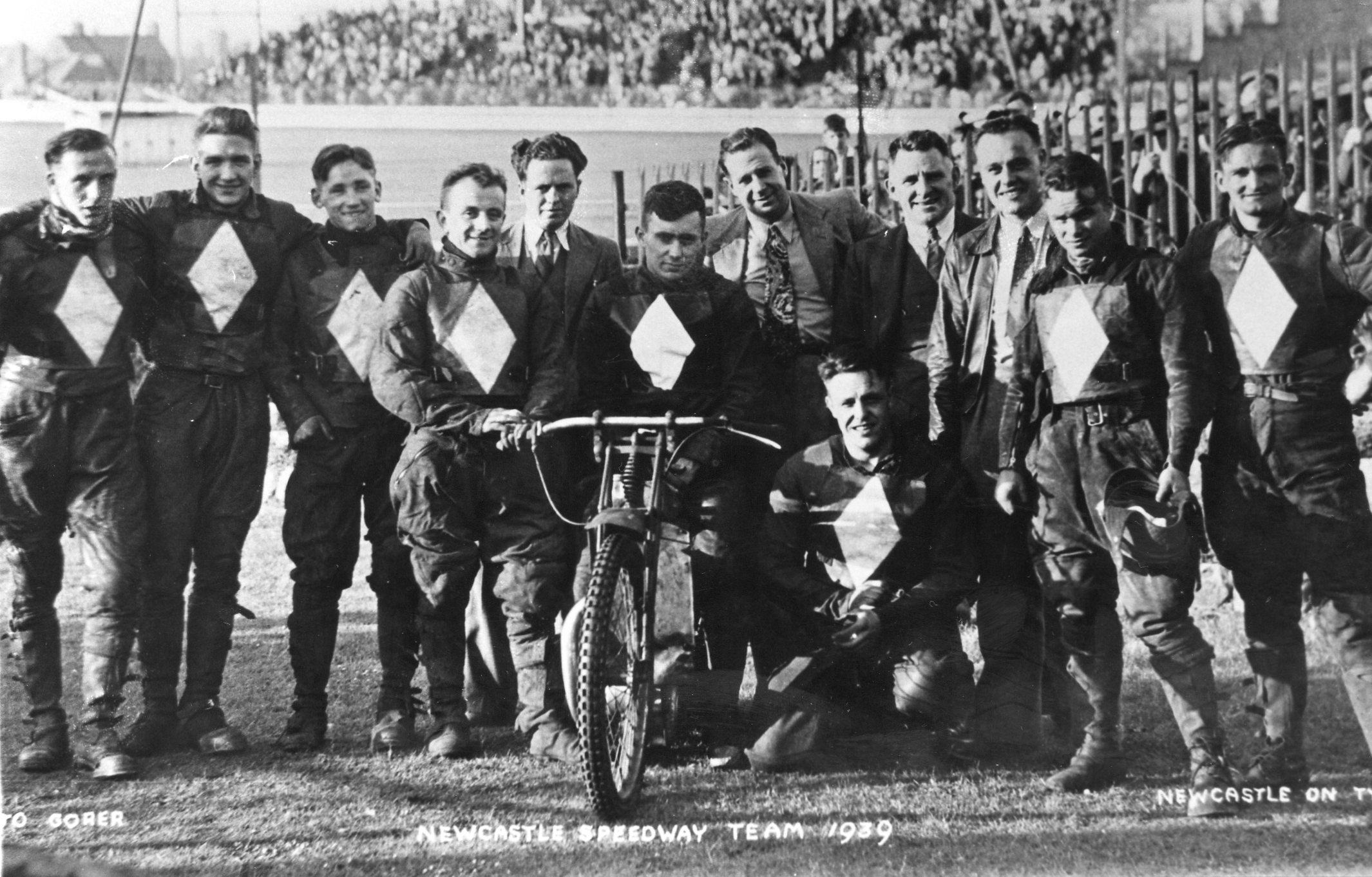
- Hoskins (fourth from right)
- Born: 16 April 1892; Waitara, New Zealand
- Died: 5 April 1987 (aged 94); Herne Bay, Kent, England
- Nationality: New Zealander

Jack Stark Hoskins MBE (16 April 1892 Waitara, New Zealand – 5 April 1987 Kent, England) was the most significant promoter of speedway and stock car racing in the United Kingdom. He is considered by some to have invented motorcycle speedway.

== Early life ==
Born at Waitara, Hoskins grew up in New Zealand, where he left school at thirteen and worked on a farm, before becoming a postman. He next decided to try his luck in Australia, working as a telegraph operator at Wagga Wagga, then moving on to Sydney.

After running low on funds in Sydney, Hoskins got on a train with enough money to get him as far as West Maitland. When he arrived there, he met some friends who helped him to set up a charity sports programme, including boxing and street stalls, which he ran with some success. He was elected Charity Carnival organiser for the Local Hunter River Agricultural Horticultural Society, and when the secretary resigned Hoskins took on his position, too.

== First speedway meeting ==
At that time, regular fund raising Carnivals were staged on the Maitland Showground by various bodies. As a keen motorcycling enthusiast, Hoskins tried to convince the Agricultural Horticultural Society committee to allow motorcycle races around the showground's trotting track.

=== Electric Light Carnival ===
On 1 December 1923, the following notice appeared in the local newspaper, the Maitland Daily Mercury:

"Motor cycle races will be a novel feature of the sports carnival to be held on December 15 on the Show Ground. The track is in splendid order, and it is expected that over 40 entries will be received for the different motor cycling events. This will be the first time that motor cycling races have been held on the Show Ground, and the events should therefore prove of great interest."

In his capacity as Secretary to the Local Hunter River Agricultural Horticultural Society, Hoskins organised a sports charity carnival called the Electric Light Carnival, staged on the Maitland Showground on 15 December 1923, to benefit the local orphanages as well as the Local Hunter River Agricultural Horticultural Society. The programme of events staged that night consisted of horse races, including trotting, cycling events, athletics, and motorcycle racing. This was the first time motorcycle racing had been staged at the venue, and this date is widely recognised as the day on which motorcycle speedway in its current form was born. Hoskins ran speedway at Maitland for two years and then moved on to Newcastle in New South Wales. 26k 74k

== Newcastle, Sydney and Claremont ==
In 1925, Hoskins intensified his motorcycle speedway racing career when he became Secretary of the promotional Newcastle Speedway Company Ltd., based at Newcastle. He also promoted speedway at the Sydney Showground during the first season of racing there in 1926–1927, but a very wet summer made the venture a flop and almost bankrupted Hoskins. He then moved on to Western Australia, where in 1927 he began promoting sports events at the Claremont Showground near Perth. Within a month, he had made almost £1,000, an amount which for most people at that time was several years' income.

== United Kingdom ==
In 1928, Hoskins decided to try promoting speedway in the United Kingdom. He set sail on the Oronsay, arriving in England without the use of a suitable track. Arthur Elvin, the chairman of Wembley Stadium, a well-known national sports venue, asked Hoskins to promote speedway at Wembley in the 1929 season. He accepted, and the Wembley Lions team was born.

In 1930, the promotion at the West Ham Stadium went broke so Hoskins acquired the promoting rights for the West Ham Hammers and ran the club for nine successful seasons until the outbreak of World War II.

In 1933, while he was at West Ham, Hoskins appeared in the British film Money for Speed, which starred John Loder, Ida Lupino, Cyril McLaglen and Moore Marriott. Ginger Lees, Lionel Van Praag and Frank Varey also featured.

Hoskins promoted or co-promoted many clubs and was a real force in British speedway. In 1950, he formed the Ashfield Giants with Norrie Isbister at Saracen Park. After leaving the Ashfield Giants at the end of the 1952 season, he went to Belle Vue Aces.

Hoskins' last such involvement was with the Canterbury Crusaders, which he founded in 1968 at the age of seventy-five, continuing for another ten years. He died in 1987, at the age of 94.

During his long career, Hoskins was connected with:

- Ashfield Giants
- Belle Vue Aces
- Odsal Boomerangs
- Canterbury Crusaders
- Edinburgh Monarchs
- Fife Lions
- Glasgow Tigers
- New Cross Rangers
- Newcastle Diamonds
- Wembley Lions
- West Ham Hammers
- Open meetings at Brighton Hove Greyhound Stadium.

== Honours ==
In the 1979 New Year Honours list, Hoskins was appointed MBE for services to speedway, and he received the badge of the order at an investiture on 27 February 1979.
