= Tuchów =

Town in Lesser Poland Voivodeship, Poland

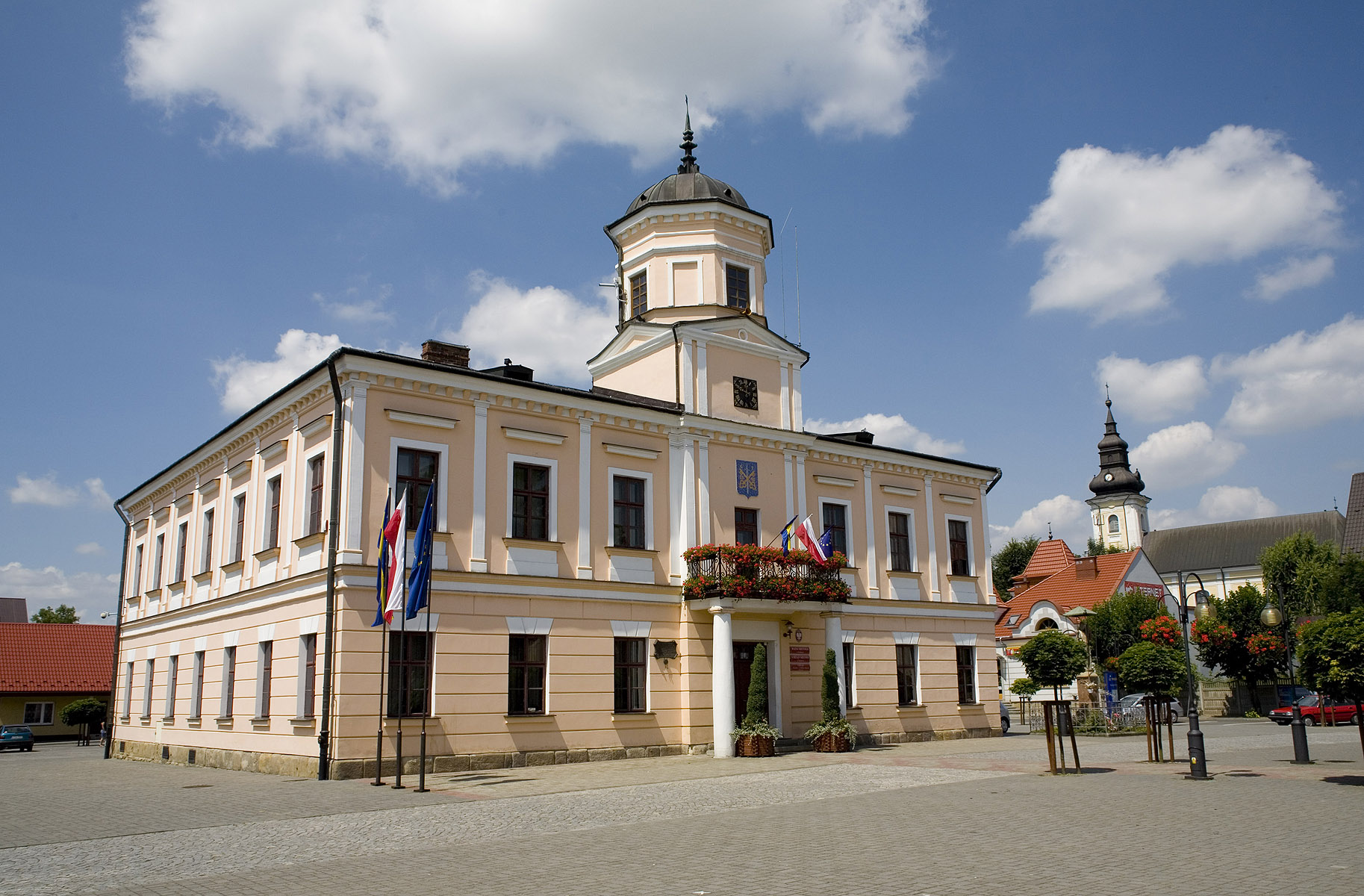
- Town hall at the Market square

- Flag Coat of arms

- Location within Poland
- Coordinates: 49°54′N 21°3′E
- Country: Poland
- Voivodeship: Lesser Poland
- County: Tarnów
- Gmina: Tuchów

Government
  - Mayor: Magdalena Marszalek

Area
  - Total: 18.15 km^{2} (7.01 sq mi)
- Elevation: 220 m (720 ft)

Population (2006)
  - Total: 6,501
  - Density: 358.2/km^{2} (927.7/sq mi)
- Time zone: UTC+1 (CET)
  - Summer (DST): UTC+2 (CEST)
- Postal code: 33-170
- Car plates: KTA
- Website: http://www.tuchow.pl

Tuchów [ˈtuxuf] is a town in Tarnów County, Lesser Poland Voivodeship, Poland, with a population of 6,476 (2004). The town lies on the Biała river, and is located on an electrified rail line from Tarnów towards Nowy Sącz and the Polish - Slovak border.

== History ==
The first historical note about Tuchów dates back to 1105. A document of papal legate Gilles de Paris tells us that the village had been given to the Tyniec Benedictine Abbey by Władysław Herman’s wife. A prosperous salt mine operated here at the turn of the 13th and 14th centuries, which caused King Casimir III the Great to grant Magdeburg rights to Tuchów in 1340. Polish writer Jan Długosz wrote in his Chronicles about the development of local artisan guilds: flourmills, carpenters, blacksmiths and furriers. By the 17th century, the town became rich by making profits from different crafts, salt exploitation and trade. In the 17th and 18th centuries, Tuchów started to decline because of invasions by Swedish and Transilvanian armies (see Swedish invasion of Poland, fires and disease outbreaks. The railway connection between Tarnów and Leluchów was opened in the 19th century, which contributed to the economical revival of the town.

In the 16th century, the cult of Holy Mary the Virgin was founded. News of miracles taking place in front of her picture spread quickly. Since that time hundreds of pilgrims come every year to the Sanctuary to worship her. Yearly celebrations take place in the first week of July. Tuchów was seriously affected by the results of the World War I. There are a few cemeteries which remind of heavy battles that were fought in that area. However, during World War II, the town was saved and as a result, it started to develop gradually after 1945. Schools and a hospital were built as well as some small plants and housing estates. The town hall and the market square were renovated, and a “Culture Centre” with a sewage treatment plant were built. The gas pipe system and water lines were also laid. There are 6632 inhabitants in Tuchów at present.

== Geography ==
Administrative unit of Tuchów is situated in Ciężkowice-Rożnów part of the Carpathian Region, by which the river “Biała” flows. Such a location is very advantageous, just 16 kilometres (10 miles) from Tarnów and 100 from Kraków. The arterial road of Lesser Poland Voivodeship, which links Tarnów with Krynica, runs past the town. The picturesque scenery that surrounds Tuchów appeared during the process of creating the Carpathian Mountains. There are beautiful hills with mild slopes. Brzanka is the highest hill in the area. It is one of the tourist attractions of the region. In 1990 Tuchów celebrated its 650th anniversary of granting with town rights, which was a good occasion to open a tourist route around the town (20 km (12 mi) long). There are also farms that offer accommodation for tourists.

== Twin towns ==
The authorities of Tuchów cooperate with 7 other towns from 7 different European countries:

- Illingen, Germany
- Pettenbach, Austria
- Detva, Slovakia
- Martfu, Hungary
- Mikulov, Czech Republic
- Baranivka, Ukraine
- Tăuții-Măgherăuș, Romania

Former twin towns:

- Saint-Jean-de-Braye, France (On 14 February 2020, the French commune decided to suspend the partnership with Tuchów as a result of the controversial anti-LGBT resolution passed by the Tuchów authorities.) On 27 October 2021, the city council passed a resolution revoking the controversial declaration.

== Notable residents ==
- Mordecai Ardon (1896–1992), painter
- Stanisław Burza (born 1977), speedway rider
- Władysław Czapliński (1905–1981), historian
- Tadeusz Michejda (1879–1956), politician
- Tadeusz Rydzyk (born 1945), priest
- Michał Wojtkiewicz (born 1946), politician

== Sports ==
Tuchów is home to a sports club Tuchovia, founded in 1925.
