= Merv Harding =

Australian motorcycle speedway rider (1926 – 1971)

- Born: 8 March 1926; Woodville, South Australia, Australia
- Died: 7 March 1971 (aged 44); Port Adelaide, Australia
- Nationality: Australian

Career history
- 1949–1952: Ashfield Giants
- 1952–1953: New Cross Rangers
- 1953: Belle Vue Aces

Individual honours
- 1950: South Australian State Champion

Mervyn Welsley Harding (8 March 1926 – 7 March 1971) was an Australian international motorcycle speedway rider. He earned 11 international caps for the Australia national speedway team.

== Biography ==
Harding, born in Woodville, South Australia, began his British leagues career riding for Ashfield Giants during the 1949 Speedway National League Division Two season. He impressed immediately averaging 8.85, second only behind fellow Australian Ken Le Breton in the team averages.

Harding spent four year with the Scottish club, before joining New Cross Rangers in 1952. In-between he reached the Championship round of the 1950 Individual Speedway World Championship, winning two qualifying rounds on the way.

Harding's British racing career came to an abrupt end when he crashed and fractured his skull in July 1953.
