= Mitchell Davey =

Australian speedway rider

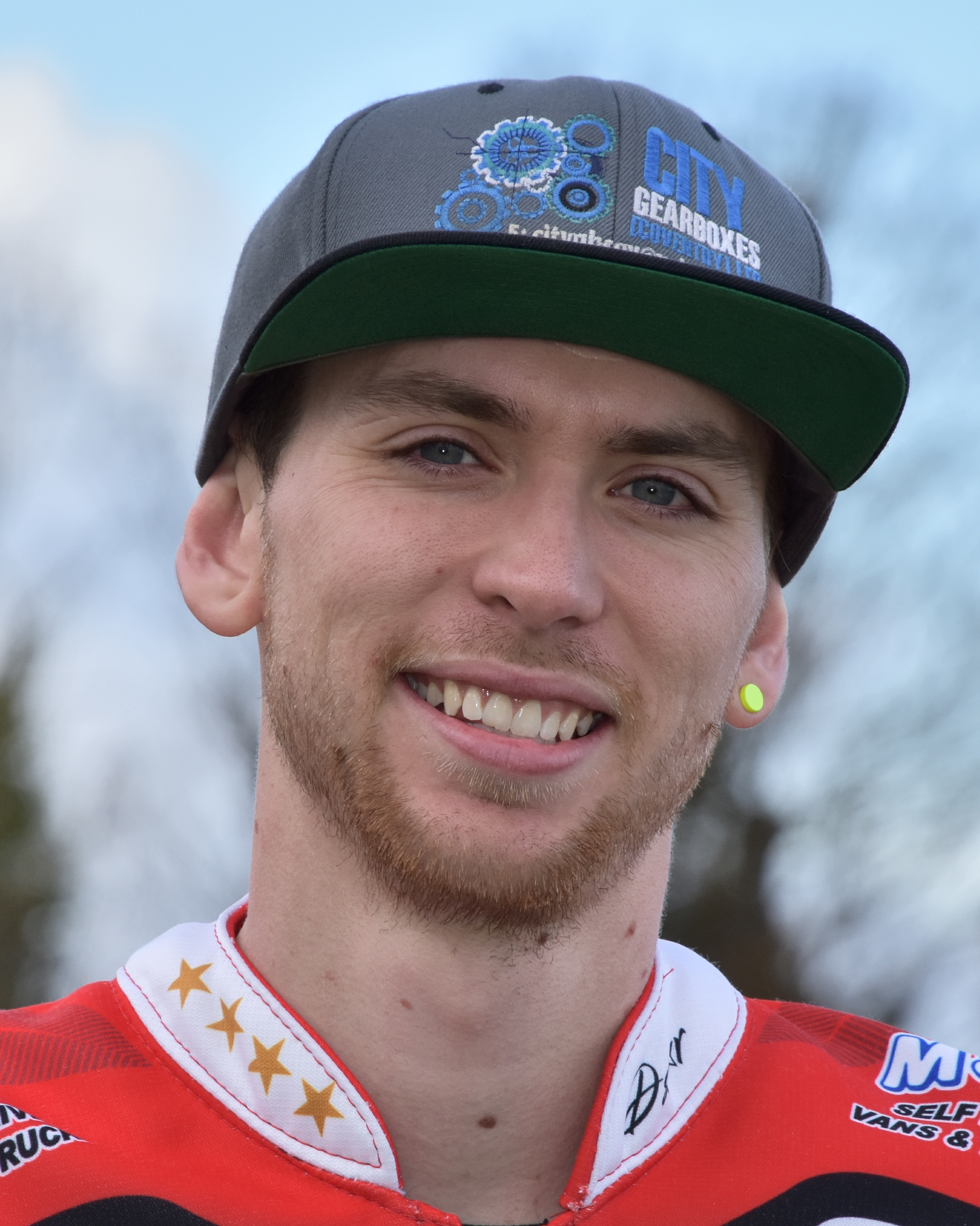
- Mitch Davey 2018
- Born: 22 March 1990 (age 36); Queensland, Australia
- Nickname: Mitch
- Nationality: Australian

Career history
- 2008-2010: Glasgow Tigers
- 2011: Berwick Bandits
- 2013, 2017: Edinburgh Monarchs
- 2013: Redcar Bears
- 2016: Coventry Storm
- 2017: Stoke Potters
- 2018: Swindon Robins
- 2018: Birmingham Brummies

Mitchell James Ryan Davey (born 22 March 1990, in Ayr, Queensland) is an Australian former motorcycle speedway rider.

== Career ==
Davey first rode in the British leagues for Glasgow Tigers during the 2008 Premier League speedway season.

In 2018, Davey was made captain of Birmingham Brummies during the 2018 National League speedway season but suffered a serious crash at the start of the season in May.

After six months recovering from vertebrae damage, a punctured lung, a broken shoulder blade and multiple broken ribs, Davey retired at the end of the 2018 season.

== Speedway Achievements ==
2016: National League Winner (Guested for Birmingham in Grand Final) 2016: Knock Out Cup Finalist (Guested for Glasgow) 2016: 1st Maximum, Stoke (Guest) vs Buxton 15/10/16 2016: 1st Paid Maximum, Birmingham (Guest) vs Isle of Wight 31/8/16

2009: Queensland U/21 Title – 2nd 2009: Queensland Title – 4th

2008: Queensland Title – 4th 2008: Queensland U/21 Title – 4th 2008: Australian U/21 Title – 6th

2007: Australian U/21 Solo Title – 14th 2007: Queensland 500cc Solo Titles – 2nd place

2005: Queensland 125cc Solo Titles – 3rd place

2004: Queensland 125cc Solo Titles – 4th place

== Long Track Achievements ==
2006: Queensland Long Track Titles – 1st (250cc) 3rd (125cc) 4th (450cc)

2005: Australian Long Track Titles – 2nd (85cc) 2nd (100cc) 4th (250cc) 5th (125cc) 2005: Queensland Long Track Titles – 1st (100cc)

2004: Australian Long Track Titles – 4th (85cc) 2004: Queensland Long Track Titles – 1st (85cc) 3rd (100cc)

2003: Australian Long Track Titles – 3rd (85cc) 4th (100cc) 2003: Queensland Long Track Titles – 1st (85cc)

2002: Queensland Long Track Titles – 1st (85cc) 2nd (100cc)

1998: Queensland Long Track Titles - 1st (50cc)

== Dirt Track Titles ==
2005 North Queensland Dirt Track Series – 2nd (250cc) 2005 Queensland Dirt Track Titles – 1st (85cc) 3rd (100cc)

2004 North Queensland Dirt Track Series – 1st (85cc) 1st (125cc)

2003 Queensland Dirt Track Titles - 1st (85cc) 2003 North Queensland Dirt Track Series – 1st (85cc)
