= Jesper Olsen (speedway rider) =

Danish speedway rider

- Born: 10 February 1967 (age 59); Valby, Denmark
- Nationality: Danish

Career history

Denmark
- 1988–2001: Slangerup

Great Britain
- 1991: Wimbledon/Eastbourne
- 1992–1995: Glasgow
- 1996: Middlesbrough
- 1997–2001, 2004: Newcastle
- 2000, 2002–2003: Belle Vue

Team honours
- British league div 2: 1993, 1994
- Knockout Cup: 1993, 1994

Jesper Ege Olsen (born 10 February 1967) is a former motorcycle speedway rider from Denmark.

== Career ==
Olsen started racing in the British leagues during the 1991 British League season, when riding for the Wimbledon Dons but following the Dons withdrawal from the league in June, he completed the season with Eastbourne Eagles.

The following season in 1992, Olsen signed for Glasgow Tigers and would spend four years with the Scottish club. He was part of the famous Glasgow league and cup double/double winning team during the 1993 British League Division Two season and 1994 British League Division Two season.

Olsen rode for Middlesbrough Bears in 1996 before joining Newcastle Diamonds in 1997. It was with Newcastle that his form improved significantly averaging over eight for five successive seasons and recording an impressive 9.68 in 1999. He also captained the Diamonds. Also in 1999, he finished runner-up to Sean Wilson in the Premier League Riders Championship, held on 12 September at Owlerton Stadium.

Olsen effectively missed the 2002 season with a significant shoulder injury but did ride a handful of races in 2003 and 2004 for Newcastle and Belle Vue Aces respectively before the injuries took their toll and he retired.
