= Ashfield Giants =

Former Scottish motorcycle speedway team

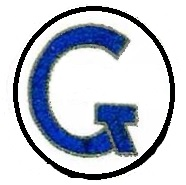

Club information
- Track address: Ashfield Stadium; Possilpark; Glasgow
- Country: Scotland
- Founded: 1949
- Closed: 1953 (reformed for 2000 only)

Ashfield Giants were a motorcycle speedway team based at Saracen Park, Glasgow, Scotland between 1949 and 1953. The track operated on an open licence in 1953 and were reformed for a one of season during the 2000 Speedway Conference League.

== History ==
Plans to build a speedway track at Saracen Park began to take hold in October 1948. Shortly afterwards it was announced by the Speedway Control Board that the disbanded Newcastle Diamonds would form a new team at the stadium.

The original Giants team were the majority of the former Newcastle side and Tuesday nights from 1949 to 1951 were "Giants Night". Arguably their most famous rider was Ken Le Breton, known as 'The White Ghost'. Ken (real name Francis) was the star man in his white painted leathers and led the Giants 1949 and 1950. Ken was the first of three Scottish-based riders to compete in a final of the Speedway World Championship in (1949). Sadly, he was killed in a track crash in his native Australia in early 1951; this prompted massive scenes of public grief at the stadium.

Co-promoters Johnnie Hoskins and Norrie Isbister presided over a team with a rider in red leathers - Aussie Merv Harding, a rider in blue leathers - another Australian Keith Gurtner and a rider who rode in yellow and black - Scotsman Willie (the wasp) Wilson. Even the reserve rider Eric Liddell joined the fun with silver leathers. All this in a time when most riders wore the standard black leathers. The team finished 11th in their inaugural 1949 Speedway National League Division Two season and then finished 11th, 8th and 7th respectively during the next three seasons.

The Giants failed to compete for silverware (except in the smaller Scottish Cup competition) and the change of race night to a Saturday in 1952 saw a significant decline. The Giants were disbanded at the end of the 1952 season, Hoskins left to promote at Belle Vue Aces and captain Willie Wilson followed. Promoter Norrie Isbister continued to arrange individual meetings during 1953.

A greyhound racing track replaced the shale from 1956 to 1999 before speedway returned to Saracen Park in 1999, with the Glasgow Tigers speedway team.

== Season summary ==
Year and league	Position	Notes
1949 Speedway National League Division Two	11th	
1950 Speedway National League Division Two	11th	
1951 Speedway National League Division Two	8th	
1952 Speedway National League Division Two	7th	
2000 Speedway Conference League	9th	

== Notable riders ==
- (Australia) Merv Harding
- (Australia) Ron Johnson
- (Australia) Ken Le Breton
- (England) Bruce Semmens
- (Australia) Chum Taylor
- (Scotland) Willie Wilson

== See also ==
- Category:Ashfield Giants riders
- List of defunct motorcycle speedway teams in the United Kingdom
