= Steve McDermott (speedway rider) =

British speedway rider

- Born: 20 January 1957 (age 69); Manchester, England
- Nationality: British (English)

Career history
- 1976–1978, 1987: Wolverhampton Wolves
- 1976–1977: Stoke Potters
- 1977–1978: Edinburgh Monarchs
- 1979–1988: Berwick Bandits
- 1980–1981, 1983: Reading Racers
- 1984: Newcastle Diamonds

Individual honours
- 1983: National League Riders' Champion

Team honours
- 1980: National League KO Cup Winner

Steven Paul McDermott (born 20 January 1957) is a former speedway rider from England.

== Speedway career ==
McDermott rode in the top two tiers of British Speedway from 1976 to 1988, riding for various clubs.

In 1983, McDermott won the National League Riders' Championship, held at Wimbledon Stadium on 24 September.
