= Bruce Semmens =

British motorcycle speedway rider

- Born: 27 December 1914; Sancreed, Cornwall, England
- Died: 4 September 1988 (aged 73)

Career history
- 1946–1949: Sheffield Tigers
- 1949: Belle Vue Aces
- 1950: Wimbledon Dons
- 1950–1952: Ashfield Giants

Team honours
- 1949: National Trophy
- 1947: British Speedway Cup (tier 2)

Walter Bruce Semmens (27 December 1914 – 4 September 1988) was a motorcycle speedway rider from England.

== Biography ==
Semmens, born in Sancreed, Cornwall, served an apprenticeship with a Penzance greengrocer, before beginning his British leagues career riding for Sheffield Tigers during the 1946 Speedway Northern League season.

The following season in 1947, Semmens remained with Sheffield and the team won the British Speedway Cup and in 1948. He improved significantly to top the team averages at 9.09.

Semmens' improvement led to several teams looking to secure his signature for the 1949 season. Coventry Bees made an unsuccessful attempt in March, offering £1,250 while Semmens continued to impress for Sheffield. Belle Vue Aces in the top league, signed Semmens for £2,000 in June and the 1949 season proved to be extremely successful, because he won the National Trophy with the Manchester team and topped the entire division two averages with Sheffield, recording 10.47.

In January 1950, Semmens signed a contract to ride on ice, in Sweden and Finland for three months. On his return, after starting for Belle Vue, he agreed to join Wimbledon Dons, as a replacement for Jimmie Gibb and Bill Pitcher but then rode for Ashfield Giants.

Semmens reached the Championship round of the 1951 Individual Speedway World Championship and the 1952 Individual Speedway World Championship and finished his career with Ashfield, riding until the end of the 1952 season.
