= Berrington Lough Stadium =

Stadium in Northumberland, England

- Location: Berrington Lough, Berwick-upon-Tweed
- Coordinates: 55°41′19″N 2°02′34″W
- Opened: 24 April 1982
- Closed: 21 October 1995

Berrington Lough Stadium also called the Berwick Motorcycle Centre was a purpose-built motorcycle speedway track located in Berrington Lough, a rural part of Northumberland, south of Berwick-upon-Tweed. The location of the track was approximately 1 mile north of Bowsden and 2 miles west of Berrington. The stadium was the home of the speedway team known as the Berwick Bandits. Today there is virtually no indication that a stadium existed, as a result of its demolition and removal.

== History ==
Towards the latter part of the 1980 National League season, the Berwick Bandits were given notice by the landlords Berwick Rangers F.C. to vacate Shielfield Park, which resulted in the need to find new premises. This followed a disagreement over rent increase demands and the final meeting was held on 6 September. The football team unsuccessfully attempted to buy the speedway team during October.

Initial attempts to build a new stadium failed and the team raced fixtures at Blantyre Greyhound Stadium during 1981 before finally identifying a plot of land towards the end of 1981. They set up a new public company and raised funds to build three grandstands, an office block, floodlighting and turnstiles.

Work began in January 1982 and the first meeting was held on 24 April 1982, when Berwick defeated Edinburgh Monarchs.

The stadium hosted a British qualifying round of the Speedway World Championship in 1986.

The team raced at the venue for 13 years but due to its remote location the club were always fighting an uphill battle to maintain good attendances and make a profit. They did however win the British League Division Two Knockout Cup and Gold Cup while at the stadium.

When the greyhound racing lease at Shielfield Park was ended by Berwick Rangers in 1995, the Berwick speedway promoter Mike Hope took the lease and the Bandits left Berrington Lough for their original home. The last meeting staged at Berrington Lough was the Academy League KO Cup Final against Stoke Potters on the 21 October 1995.
