= David Blackburn (speedway rider) =

British former motorcycle speedway rider

- Born: 7 January 1962 (age 64); Coventry, England
- Nationality: British (English)

Career history
- 1981: Workington Comets
- 1982, 1993: Long Eaton Invaders
- 1982–1983: Boston Barracudas
- 1983: Leicester Lions
- 1984–1985: Milton Keynes Knights
- 1985: Reading Racers
- 1986–1987: Newcastle 'Federation Specials'/Diamonds
- 1987: Belle Vue Aces
- 1988: Middlesbrough Tigers
- 1988: Glasgow Tigers
- 1989–1992, 1997: Berwick Bandits
- 1993: Sheffield Tigers
- 1994: Swindon Robins

David Martin Blackburn (born 7 January 1962) is a former motorcycle speedway rider from England, whose career began in the late 1970s and continued until 1997.

== Career ==
Blackburn was born in Coventry and is the son of former Coventry Bees team manager Mick Blackburn. After second half rides in 1979 and 1980 he was signed by Leicester Lions for whom he rode in junior events and he was loaned out to National League teams Workington Comets in 1981, Long Eaton Invaders in 1982, and Boston Barracudas in 1981, 1982 and 1983. He made a handful of appearances in Leicester's senior team before the club folded at the end of the 1983 season.

Blackburn then moved on to Milton Keynes Knights and Newcastle for two seasons each, also riding in the British League for Belle Vue Aces, Ipswich Witches, Sheffield Tigers and Wolverhampton Wolves in 1987. After riding for Glasgow Tigers in 1988, he spent four years with Berwick Bandits. After a season each with Sheffield and Swindon Robins he retired in 1994, but returned to Berwick in 1997 for his final season in British speedway.

Blackburn returned to the track in 2007 in a farewell meeting at Redcar for Kevin Little.
