= Glasgow Tigers (speedway) =

Motorcycle speedway team

Club information
- Track address: Ashfield Stadium; Possilpark; Glasgow
- Country: Scotland
- Founded: 1928
- Promoter: Alan Dick & Michael Max
- Team manager: Cameron Brown
- Team captain: Chris Harris
- League: SGB Championship
- Website: glasgowtigers.co.uk

Club facts
- Colours: Red and White
- Track size: 306 metres (335 yd) (pre 2011 302 metres (330 yd))
- Track record time: 55.08 seconds
- Track record date: 21 May 2021
- Track record holder: Leon Flint

Current team
| Rider | CMA |
|---|---|
| (England) Chris Harris |
| (Denmark) Kevin Juhl Pedersen |
| (England) Leon Flint |
| (England) Sam Hagon |
| (England) Kyle Howarth |
| (Germany) Mario Hausl |
| (England) Freddy Hodder |

Major team honours
| League (tier 2) | 1993, 1994, 2011, 2023 |
| Knockout Cup (tier 2) | 1993, 1994, 2016 |
| Pairs champions (tier 2) | 2005, 2006, 2011, 2019, 2023 |
| Scottish Cup | 1953 |

Glasgow Tigers are a motorcycle speedway team from Glasgow, Scotland. Formed in 1928, the club adopted the Tigers nickname in 1946 and compete in the British SGB Championship.

== History ==
=== Origins and 1920s ===
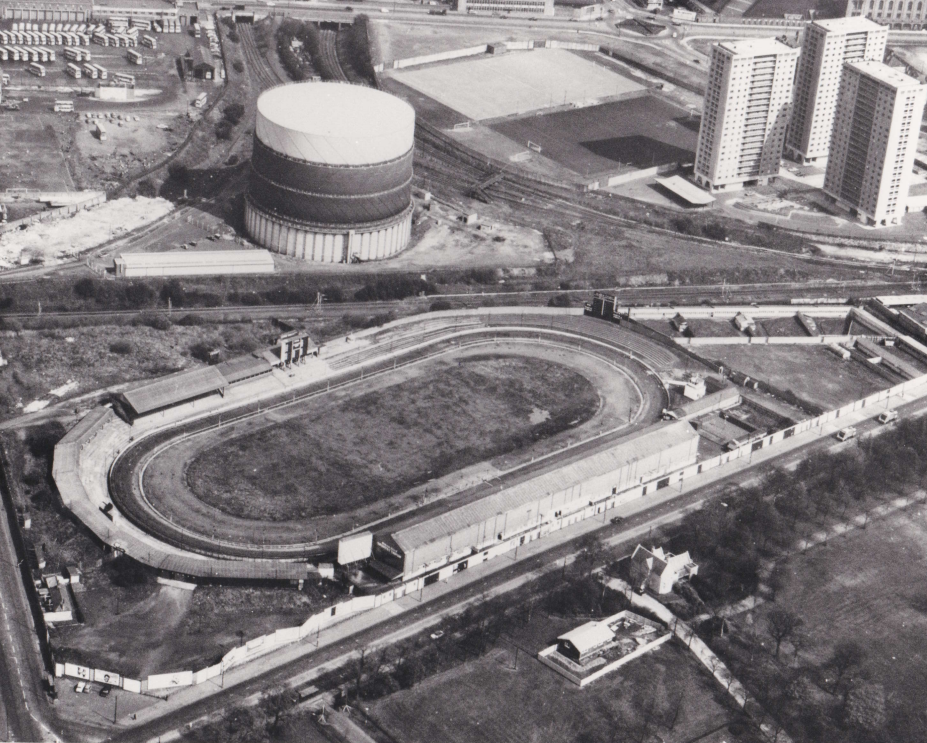
White City Stadium

Speedway in Glasgow began during 1928, starting with the Nelson Recreation Ground on 9 April, followed by Celtic Park on 28 April and Carntyne Stadium on 25 May. The origins of the Tigers team can be traced to the first meeting held at White City Stadium on Paisley Road West in Ibrox, Glasgow on 29 June 1928, although at this stage only open meetings were held. White City had been built in 1928 as a greyhound track. A Glasgow White City team raced several challenge matches during the 1929 season before becoming members of the Northern League for 1930.

=== 1930s ===
The first Northern League fixture at White City was held on 22 April 1930 against Leicester Super. The team eventually finished tenth in their inaugural league season. However, the team abruptly withdrew mid-way through the 1931 season following a meeting by the directors.

Speedway ceased not only at White City but also the other tracks in Glasgow and no racing was seen for seven years before 'the Lions' under the promotion of Johnnie Hoskins raced Union Cup matches, in addition to challenge meetings during 1939.

=== 1940s ===
The team raced as the Tigers for the first time in 1946

Several fixtures were held in 1940 before the threat of bombing during World War II closed the track to speedway for another five years. Several fixtures were held in late Summer of 1945 and league speedway finally returned for the 1946 Speedway Northern League season. Led by number 1 rider Will Lowther the team adopted the nickname 'Tigers' for the first time and Johnnie Hoskins handed the promotion role over to his son Ian who promoted from 1946 to 1953.

Despite signings, including the likes of Junior Bainbridge and Ken McKinlay, the White City Tigers experienced several underwhelming seasons and ended the decade with an eighth-place finish.

=== 1950s ===
The 1950s began much better with the Tigers finishing the 1950 season as runners-up, just one point behind Norwich Stars. The team included new signing Tommy Miller and the Hodgson brothers Frank and Jack. One of the team's league rivals was Ashfield Giants, who were formed in 1949 and raced at Saracen Park in Glasgow.

Tommy Miller topped the league averages in 1953 and the team won the Scottish Cup but as the team headed into the 1954 season matters deteriorated. Miller, McKinlay and Bainbridge were all put on the transfer list. The club eventually pulled out of the league following several fixtures in early 1954, citing financial losses despite the sale of its stars. Miller and Bainbridge were responsible for a short-lived venture in 1956 but speedway ended for another ten years.

=== 1960s ===
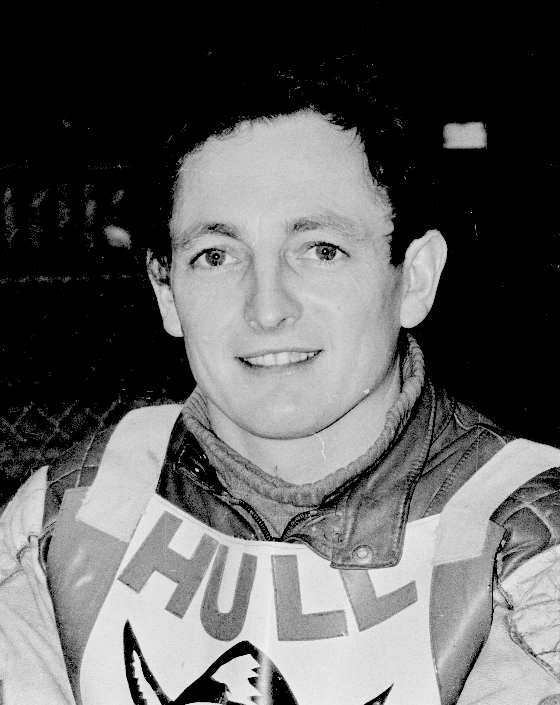
Jimmy McMillan was signed in 1966

Trevor Redmond, in concert with the Hoskins family, reopened the track at White City in 1964 and rode for the Tigers that season before finally retiring as a rider and continued as promoter until 1967. The 1964 season started with the signing of Australian Charlie Monk but ended with a last place finish in the league.

The team finished in 13th place during the inaugural 1965 British League season and Jimmy McMillan was signed in 1966. Danny Taylor arrived as promoter in 1967 but left after just one season due to travel problems from Glasgow to his chicken farm business in Jedburgh. He moved on to form the Berwick Bandits in 1968 and Les Whaley took over Glasgow.

The Tigers moved to Hampden Park in 1969 in anticipation of the White City stadium demolition to make way for the M8 motorway through Glasgow. White City did not close until a few years later. A nomadic existence was then experienced by the club for a prolonged period.

=== 1970s ===
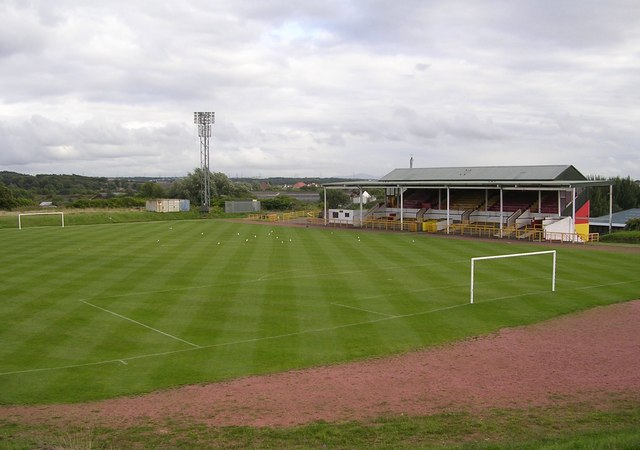
Cliftonhill

Hampden Park witnessed recent signing Svein Kaasa being killed during a race on 29 September 1972. Problems continued at Hampden Park with poor crowds, escalating costs and the refusal of the city council to allow music to be played at the venue, so the club moved again to Cliftonhill in Coatbridge in 1973, becoming the Coatbridge Tigers.

The next issue arose in early 1977 when Cliftonhill's owners Albion Rovers F.C. applied for permission to convert the track into a greyhound racing track and gave the speedway Managing Director Jimmy Beaton notice to vacate.

The Tigers moved to their fourth different home at the Blantyre Greyhound Stadium in Blantyre during the middle of the 1977 season but fans received some good news when the club re-introduced the name Glasgow Tigers. Steve Lawson was signed in 1978 and Kenny McKinna joined the following season to end a most turbulent decade.

=== 1980s ===
The greyhound stadium was demolished in advance of the construction of the East Kilbride Expressway and the Tigers moved to yet another home (their fifth) in 1982 to Craighead Park. The track at Craighead Park was shoe-horned into a football stadium but was a more traditional oval shape than the previous one.

During all the turmoil the team unsurprisingly failed to win any silverware and then in 1987 matters worsened further. The Tigers moved to Derwent Park in Workington and although they started the year named as Glasgow, they were renamed Workington Tigers for the rest of what was an uncompleted season. This was the only time in the team's history that they have been based in England.

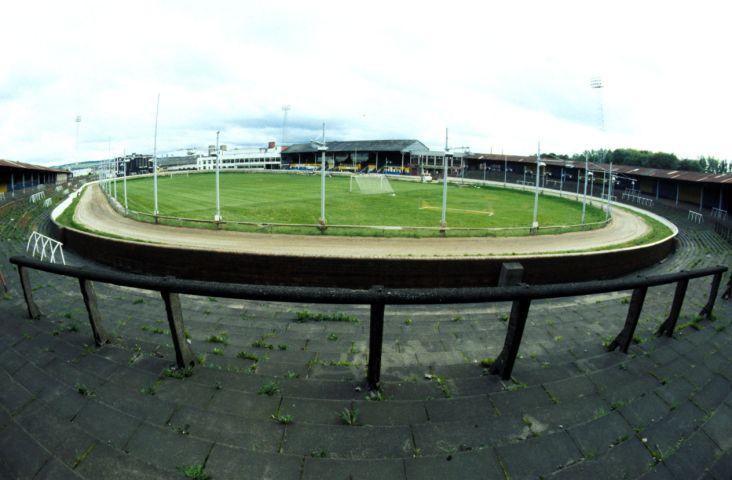
Shawfield, the seventh home of the Tigers

In 1988, the club returned to Glasgow when they moved into Shawfield Stadium in Rutherglen.

=== 1990s ===
The team began to show promise and in 1991 James Grieves joined the club, teaming up with Steve Lawson, Mick Powell and Shane Bowes. Together they helped Glasgow finish runner-up behind Arena Essex Hammers in 1991. A third-place finish in 1992 was followed by the League and Knockout Cup double to bring Glasgow their first major success in the club's history. The double team included Bowes, Powell, Grieves, number 1 Róbert Nagy, Nigel Crabtree, Jesper Olsen and David Walsh. The following season the team achieved the 'double double' feat, winning both the League and Cup again in consecutive years.

The success was abruptly ended by the merger of the first and second tiers of the British league into the one division Premier League. The following season in 1996, the Tigers and Edinburgh Monarchs effectively merged in one unpopular team known as the Scottish Monarchs. The formation of the Elite League allowed the Tigers and Monarchs to revert to their normal routine.

The decade ended on a sour note when the team's owner Brian Sands and general manager Bob Sneddon were connected to a racing application for Ashfield Stadium (the former venue of the Ashfield Giants). This caused Shawfield's owner Billy King to threaten eviction. The club eventually moved to Ashfield Stadium, with the speedway track replacing the old greyhound racing track.

=== 2000s ===
The first five years at Ashfield saw the team finish bottom of the league twice but in 2005, Shane Parker and George Štancl claimed the Premier League Pairs Championship held at Ashfield Stadium on 26 June. The pairs event was won by Glasgow for the second consecutive season when Parker and Danny Bird were winners.

=== 2010s ===
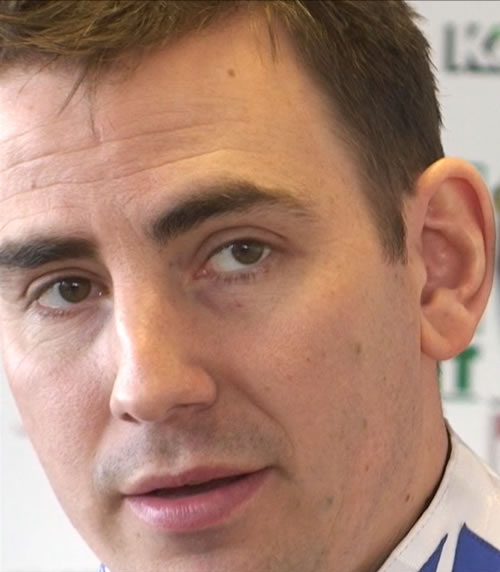
James Grieves

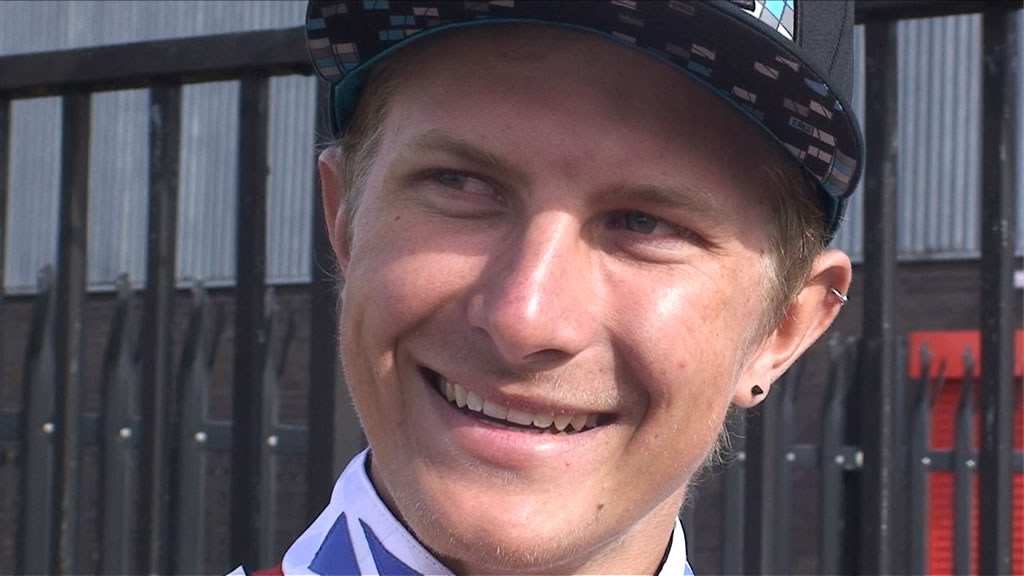
Josh Grajczonek

Prior to the 2011 season the club embarked on significant changes to the Ashfield track, extending its length by 17 meters on the inside, but more significantly widening the bends and increasing the banking, especially on bends three and four, opening up new racing lines in an effort to up the entertainment value of the meetings. The changes proved successful as the Tigers won the league title led by heat leaders Joe Screen, Josh Grajczonek and James Grieves and in addition Screen and Grieves won The Premier League Pairs Championship, held at Oaktree Arena on 24 June.

With debts still hanging over the club at the end of the 2012 season, following the track alterations and championship season, club owners A&S Entertainments decided to sell the club, a new company was created with several key fans taking control of the club prior to the 2013 season. The club logo was also re-branded with the change of company, the old logo continues to be the club badge, and is still used for the Hall of Fame. In 2015, the stadium went under a multi-million pound redevelopment.

In 2016, the Tigers won the KO cup final against Newcastle Diamonds. For the 2018 season, the Tigers signed Craig Cook, who went on to win the Riders' Championship and record the highest league average for the season, as Glasgow finished 2nd on the league standings.

The 2019 season saw the Tigers finish in second place again in the SGB Championship. They reached the play-off finals, but fell short by losing to league winners Leicester Lions by two points but did win the Pairs Championship with Craig Cook and Rasmus Jensen.

=== 2020s ===
Following a season lost to the COVID-19 pandemic, the Tigers finished runners-up in both the 2021 and 2022 SGB Championship league standings, losing in the play-off final against the Poole Pirates in the former.

In 2023, the team won the league title after winning the play offs and gaining revenge over Poole for their 2021 and 2022 losses. Having already won the pairs title with Chris Harris and Benjamin Basso, Glasgow signed Russian Vadim Tarasenko late in the season, which proved to be the catalyst for winning the play offs, defeating Oxford Cheetahs and Poole to claim only their fourth ever title.

== Season summary ==
Extended content

| Year and league | League Position | Notes |
|---|---|---|
| 1930 Speedway Northern League | 10th | |
| 1931 Speedway Northern League | 6th | withdrew, results stood |
| 1946 Speedway Northern League | 6th | |
| 1947 Speedway National League Division Two | 8th | |
| 1948 Speedway National League Division Two | 6th | |
| 1949 Speedway National League Division Two | 8th | |
| 1950 Speedway National League Division Two | 2nd | |
| 1951 Speedway National League Division Two | 10th | |
| 1952 Speedway National League Division Two | 5th | |
| 1953 Speedway National League Division Two | 4th | Scottish Cup winners |
| 1954 Speedway National League Division Two | n/a | withdrew after Northern Shield |
| 1964 Provincial Speedway League | 12th | |
| 1965 British League season | 13th | |
| 1966 British League season | 8th | |
| 1967 British League season | 13th | |
| 1968 British League season | 19th | |
| 1969 British League season | 8th | |
| 1970 British League season | 8th | |
| 1971 British League season | 16th | |
| 1972 British League season | 14th | |
| 1973 British League season | 17th | as Coatbridge Tigers |
| 1974 British League Division Two season | 9th | as Coatbridge Tigers |
| 1975 New National League season | 12th | as Coatbridge Tigers |
| 1976 National League season | 7th | as Coatbridge Tigers |
| 1977 National League season | 11th | |
| 1978 National League season | 9th | |
| 1979 National League season | 7th | |
| 1980 National League season | 11th | |
| 1981 National League season | 5th | |
| 1982 National League season | 11th | |
| 1983 National League season | 13th | |
| 1984 National League season | 11th | |
| 1985 National League season | 17th | |
| 1986 National League season | 18th | |
| 1987 National League season | N/A | based at Workington, results expunged |
| 1988 National League season | 10th | |
| 1989 National League season | 9th | |
| 1990 National League season | 4th | |
| 1991 British League Division Two season | 2nd | |
| 1992 British League Division Two season | 3rd | |
| 1993 British League Division Two season | 1st | champions & Knockout Cup winners |
| 1994 British League Division Two season | 1st | champions & Knockout Cup winners |
| 1995 Premier League speedway season | 7th | |
| 1997 Premier League speedway season | 6th | |
| 1998 Premier League speedway season | 7th | |
| 1999 Premier League speedway season | 12th | |
| 2000 Premier League speedway season | 9th | |
| 2001 Premier League speedway season | 13th | |
| 2002 Premier League speedway season | 17th | |
| 2003 Premier League speedway season | 12th | |
| 2004 Premier League speedway season | 11th | |
| 2005 Premier League speedway season | 12th | pairs winners |
| 2006 Premier League speedway season | 3rd | pairs winners |
| 2007 Premier League speedway season | 8th | |
| 2008 Premier League speedway season | 15th | |
| 2009 Premier League speedway season | 13th | |
| 2010 Premier League speedway season | 13th | |
| 2011 Premier League speedway season | 1st | League champions, pairs winners |
| 2012 Premier League speedway season | 8th | |
| 2013 Premier League speedway season | 13th | |
| 2014 Premier League speedway season | 11th | |
| 2015 Premier League speedway season | 3rd | PO final |
| 2016 Premier League speedway season | 2nd | PO semi final, Knockout cup winners |
| SGB Championship 2017 | 4th | |
| SGB Championship 2018 | 2nd | PO semi final |
| SGB Championship 2019 | 2nd | PO final |
| SGB Championship 2021 | 2nd | PO final |
| SGB Championship 2022 | 2nd | PO semi final |
| SGB Championship 2023 | 3rd | Champions & Pairs winners |
| SGB Championship 2024 | 5th | |
| SGB Championship 2025 | 1st | PO final |

== Riders previous seasons ==
Extended content

2006 team

- (Australia) Shane Parker
- (England) Danny Bird
- (Finland) Kauko Nieminen
- (Scotland) David McAllan
- (England) Lee Dicken
- (England) James Cockle
- (Australia) Robert Ksiezak

2007 team

- (Australia) Shane Parker
- (Australia) Craig Watson
- (England) Michael Coles
- (Australia) Robert Ksiezak
- (Australia) Trent Leverington
- (Scotland) David McAllan
- (England) Lee Dicken

Also Rode:

- (Czech Republic) George Stancl

2008 team

- (Australia) Shane Parker
- (Australia) Trent Leverington
- (Australia) Robert Ksiezak
- (Australia) Mitchell Davey
- (Australia) Josh Grajczonek
- (England) Lee Dicken
- (Denmark) Anders Andersen

Also Rode:

- (Scotland) Ross Brady

2009 team

- (Scotland) James Grieves
- (Australia) Josh Grajczonek
- (Scotland) William Lawson
- (Australia) Mitchell Davey
- (Denmark) Anders Andersen
- (Slovenia) Sandi Conda
- (Australia) Shane Parker

2010 team

- (England) Joe Screen
- (Australia) Travis McGowan
- (Australia) Josh Grajczonek
- (England) Lee Dicken
- (England) John Branney
- (Australia) Jake Anderson
- (Australia) Nick Morris

Also Rode:

- (Scotland) James Grieves
- (Australia) Robert Ksiezak
- (Australia) Mitchell Davey
- (Denmark) Anders Andersen
- (England) Jamie Courtney
- (Australia) Michael Penfold

2011 team

- (England) Joe Screen
- (Australia) Richard Sweetman
- (Scotland) James Grieves
- (Netherlands) Theo Pijper
- (Poland) Michal Rajkowski
- (Australia) Nick Morris
- (France) David Bellego

Also Rode:

- (Australia) Josh Grajczonek (Broken Femur)
- (Australia) Christian Henry (Broken Collarbone)

2012 team

- (England) Joe Screen
- (Scotland) James Grieves
- (Australia) Mason Campton
- (Australia) Josh Grajczonek
- (Denmark) Henning Bager
- (England) Charles Wright
- (Scotland) James McBain

Also Rode:

- (Australia) Robert Ksiezak
- (New Zealand) Jade Mudgeway
- (England) Chris Mills
- (Australia) Jayden O'Malley
- (Czech Republic) Filip Šitera

2013 team

- (England) Joe Screen
- (Scotland) James Grieves
- (Denmark) Henning Bager
- (Australia) Joey Ringwood
- (England) Joe Jacobs
- (Australia) Dakota North
- (Denmark) Anders Thomsen

Also Rode:

- (England) James Wright
- (Australia) Harley Horwood
- (England) Andre Compton
- (Denmark) Jonas Raun

2015 team

- (Finland) Kauko Nieminen
- (Australia) Aaron Summers- Captain
- (Australia) Nick Morris
- (Sweden) Victor Palovaara
- (England) Richard Lawson
- (Czech Republic) Hynek Stichauer
- (England) James Sarjeant

Also Rode

- (England) David Howe Retired
- (Australia) Kozza Smith Injured
- (France) Dimitri Berge Transferred

2016 team

- (England) Richard Lawson
- (Australia) Aaron Summers- Captain
- (England) Richie Worrall
- (England) Danny Ayres
- (Denmark) Rene Bach
- (Finland) Nike Lunna
- (Argentina) Coty Garcia

Also Rode

- (England) Ben Barker

2017 team

- (Australia) Aaron Summers- Captain
- (England) Richie Worrall
- (England) Richard Lawson
- (Finland) Nike Lunna
- (England) Daniel Bewley
- (England) Tom Perry
- (England) Jack Smith

2018 team

- (England) Craig Cook
- (England) Nathan Greaves
- (Denmark) Claus Vissing
- (England) Paul Starke
- (England) Chris Harris-Captain
- (England) James Sarjeant
- (England) Jack Thomas

Also rode:

- (England) Richie Worrall
- (England) Lewis Kerr

2019 team

- (England) Craig Cook -Captain
- (Denmark) Rasmus Jensen
- (Denmark) Claus Vissing
- (Denmark) Sam Jensen
- (Denmark) Mikkel B Andersen
- (England) Kyle Bickley
- (Scotland) Connor Bailey

Also rode:

- (England) Paul Starke
- (England) Luke Chessell
- (England) James Sarjeant

2021 team

- (England) Craig Cook -Captain
- (England) Tom Brennan
- (United States) Broc Nicol
- (Denmark) Sam Jensen
- (United States) Ricky Wells- Captain
- (Poland) Marcin Nowak
- (Scotland) Connor Bailey

Also rode:

- (England) Jack Smith
- (Denmark) Ulrich Østergaard
- (Australia) Justin Sedgman

2022 team

- (Denmark) Benjamin Basso
- (Australia) Connor Bailey
- (England) Tom Brennan
- (England) Craig Cook (C)
- (England) Danyon Hume
- (United States) Broc Nicol
- (Denmark) Ulrich Østergaard

== Notable riders ==
=== STARs Hall Of Fame ===
- (England) Steve Lawson – Inducted 2011
- (Scotland) Jim McMillan – Inducted 2011
- (Scotland) James Grieves – Inducted 2011
- (Australia) Shane Parker – Inducted 2012
- (Scotland) Jimmy Beaton – Inducted 2013
- (Australia) Charlie Monk – Inducted 2013

=== Other notable riders ===
- (Australia) Junior Bainbridge
- (Denmark) Benjamin Basso
- (Scotland) Bobby Beaton
- (Australia) Shane Bowes
- (Scotland) Brian Collins
- (England) Les Collins
- (England) Craig Cook
- (England) Sean Courtney
- (England) Nigel Crabtree
- (England) Joe Crowther
- (Australia) Josh Grajczonek
- (England) Chris Harris
- (Denmark) Rasmus Jensen
- (England) Will Lowther
- (England) Maury Mattingley
- (Scotland) Ken McKinlay
- (Scotland) Kenny McKinna
- (Scotland) Tommy Miller
- (Hungary) Róbert Nagy
- (Denmark) Jesper Olsen
- (Australia) Mick Powell
- (England) Joe Screen
- (Czech Republic) George Štancl
- (Russia) Vadim Tarasenko
- (Scotland) Willie Templeton
- (England) David Walsh

== Club honours ==
Division Two league winners

- Champions: 1993, 1994, 2011, 2023.

Division Two Knock Out Cup

- Winners: 1993, 1994, 2016

Pairs champions

- Champions: 2005, 2006, 2011, 2019, 2023.
