= Kenny McKinna =

Scottish speedway rider (born 1962)

- Born: 21 October 1962 (age 64); Glasgow, Scotland
- Nationality: British (Scottish)

Career history
- 1979–1983, 1988–1990: Glasgow Tigers
- 1982: Eastbourne Eagles
- 1983–1987: Belle Vue Aces
- 1988: Wolverhampton Wolves
- 1988: Ipswich Witches
- 1991: Middlesbrough Bears
- 1992–1995, 1997–1998: Edinburgh Monarchs
- 1996: Scottish Monarchs

Individual honours
- 1994: British Championship finalist
- 1989: National League Riders' runner-up

Team honours
- 1983: British League Cup winner
- 1993: Fours Championship winner

Archibald Kenneth McKinna (born 21 October 1962) is a former international motorcycle speedway rider from Scotland.

== Speedway career ==
McKinna rode in the top tier of British Speedway from 1979 to 1998, riding for various clubs. He started his career with Glasgow Tigers in 1979 and quickly established himself as a rider, winning the 1980 Scottish pairs title with Steve Lawson.

In 1993, McKinna helped the Edinburgh Monarchs win the Fours Championship during the 1993 British League Division Two season.

McKinna reached the final of the British Speedway Championship in 1994.

== Family ==
McKinna came from a speedway family, with his brothers Charlie and Martin both being speedway riders. His son Adam was also a speedway rider.
