= Saracen Park =

Stadium in Glasgow, Scotland

- Location in Glasgow
- Full name: Ashfield Stadium
- Address: Hawthorn Street, Possilpark
- Location: Glasgow, Scotland
- Coordinates: 55.886036°N 4.243898°W
- Type: Stadium
- Surface: Grass
- Public transit: Ashfield railway station

Construction
- Opened: 1937

Tenants
- Ashfield F.C. Ashfield Giants Glasgow Tigers: 1937–2022; 1949–1953; 1999–present

Saracen Park or Ashfield Stadium, also known as Peugeot Ashfield Stadium for sponsorship reasons, is a stadium in Glasgow, Scotland. It is currently home to Glasgow Tigers for speedway. It has also previously been a venue for greyhound racing and for Ashfield F.C. for football. The ground was originally opened for football in 1937.

== History ==
Ashfield F.C. opened Saracen Park for junior football in 1937, and played at the ground until 2022. Located in the Possilpark area of Glasgow, it was named after the adjacent Saracen Foundry.

== Speedway ==
The first speedway team to race at Ashfield Stadium – as it is known for racing purposes – were the Ashfield Giants between 1949 and 1953. After the Giants went out of business, the track was adapted for greyhound racing, which was staged at Ashfield from 1956 until 1998. Speedway returned to the stadium in 1999 when the Glasgow Tigers relocated from Shawfield Stadium.

== Greyhound racing ==
Promoter Jimmy Donald Sr. opened the greyhound track on 21 April 1956. It was known as Ashfield Stadium and was regarded as one of the premier independent (unlicensed) tracks in Scotland with major events called the Ashfield St Leger, Scottish Cup and Anniversary Stakes in addition to the Ashfield Derby which offered substantial prize money. The circumference was 400 yards consisting of distances of 270, 450, 640 and 930 yards. The management declined an invite from the National Greyhound Racing Club in 1989.

The track was laid upon the old speedway track before reverting to speedway in 1999 with the Glasgow Tigers.
