= Steve Wilcock =

British speedway rider

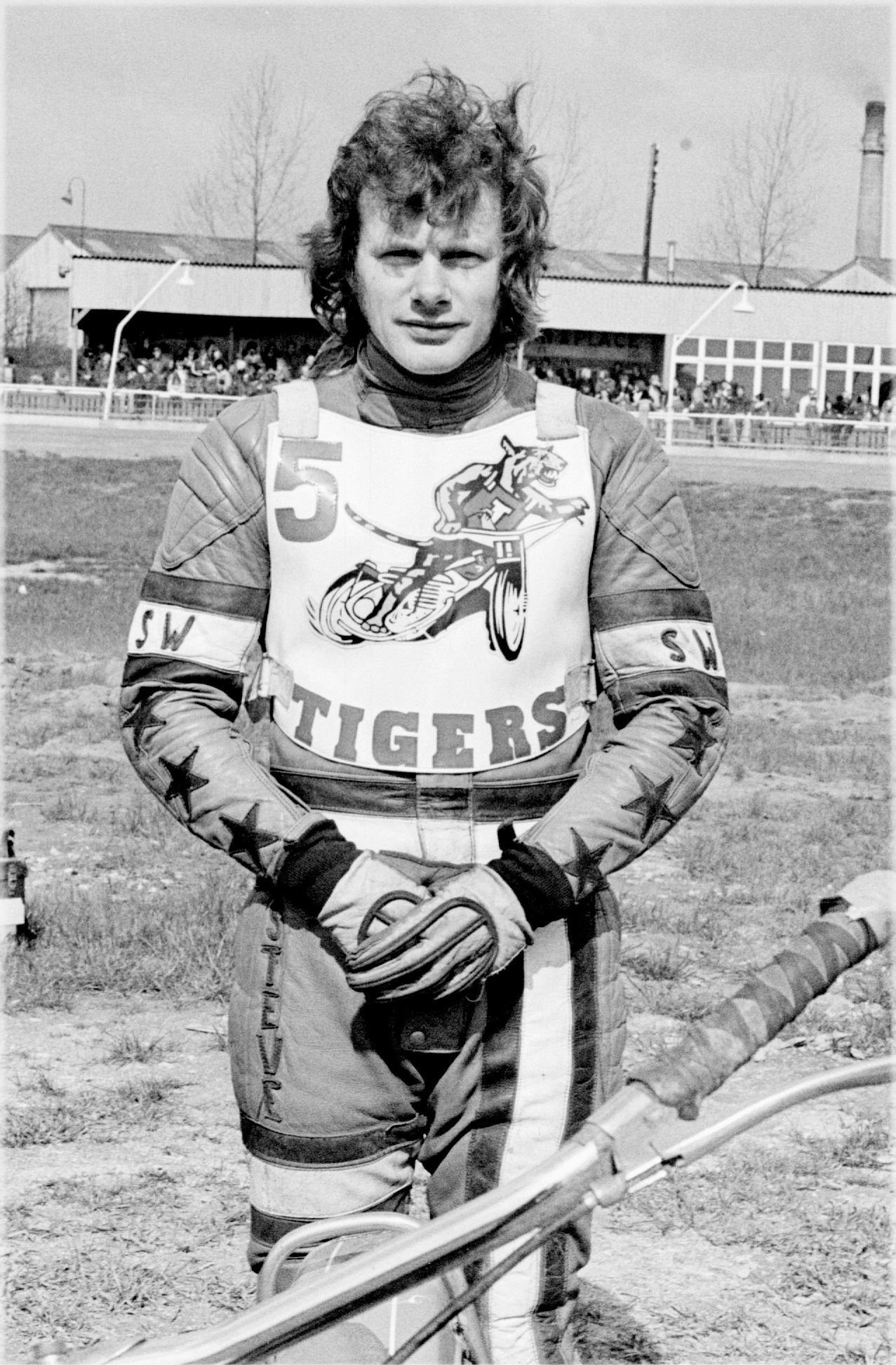
- Born: 24 January 1954 (age 72); Dewsbury, West Yorkshire, England
- Nationality: British (English)

Career history
- 1974–1975: Bradford Barons
- 1976–1987, 1989–1991: Teesside/Middlesbrough Tigers/Bears
- 1979: Halifax Dukes
- 1980: Belle Vue Aces
- 1981–1982: Coventry Bees
- 1983: Birmingham Brummies
- 1984: Oxford Cheetahs
- 1988: Rye House Rockets

Individual honours
- 1979: National League Riders' runner-up

Team honours
- 1981: National League Champion
- 1980: National League Pairs Champion
- 1985, 1986: National League Fours Champion

Stephen Byron Wilcock (born 24 January 1954) is a former motorcycle speedway from England.

== Speedway career ==
Wilcock rode in the top two tiers of British Speedway from 1974 to 1991, riding for various clubs.

In 1979, Wilcock finished runner-up in the National League Riders' Championship. He won the National League Pairs, partnering Mark Courtney for the Middlesbrough Tigers, during the 1980 National League season. He was regarded as one of the leading National League riders at the time, consistently finishing in the top ten averages.

In 1985, Wilcock helped the Middlesbrough Tigers win the Fours Championship during the 1985 National League season. The following season in 1986, he helped Middlesbrough win the Fours Championship again, during the 1986 National League season. He retired after the 1991 season.
