= Steve Lawson (speedway rider) =

British speedway rider

- Born: 11 December 1957 (age 68); Workington, Cumbria, England
- Nationality: British (English)

Career history
- 1974–1977: Workington Comets
- 1976–1977, 1987: Belle Vue Aces
- 1978–1992: Glasgow Tigers
- 1979: Birmingham Brummies
- 1980, 1982: Cradley Heathens
- 1981, 1984: Swindon Robins
- 1987: Workington Tigers

Individual honours
- 1983: Scottish Open Champion
- 1984: Leading average

Stephen Faulder Lawson (born 11 December 1957) is a former speedway rider from England.

== Speedway career ==
Lawson rode in the top two tiers of British Speedway from 1974 to 1992, riding for various clubs.

In 1978, Lawson joined the Glasgow Tigers and while there he won the 1980 Scottish pairs title with Kenny McKinna.

Lawson was one of the leading National League riders and topped the league averages during the 1984 National League season, in addition to finishing in the top-ten averages in 1980, 1981, 1982, 1983 and 1985. Lawson won the Silver Helmet in 1981.
