= Eric Monaghan =

English speedway rider

- Born: 31 October 1957 (age 69); Whitley Cheshire, Greater Manchester, England
- Nationality: British (English)

Career history
- 1979–1982: Ellesmere Port Gunners
- 1982, 1984–1985: Halifax Dukes
- 1983: Sheffield Tigers
- 1983: Leicester Lions
- 1986: Bradford Dukes
- 1986–1988: Mildenhall Fen Tigers
- 1989–1992: Stoke Potters
- 1993–1994: Peterborough Panthers
- 1995: Long Eaton Invaders

Team honours
- 1989: National League Pairs Winner
- 1979, 1987, 1990: National League Fours Champion

Eric James Monaghan (born 31 October 1957) is a former motorcycle speedway rider from England.

== Career ==
Monaghan made his British leagues debut during the 1979 National League season, where he rode for Ellesmere Port Gunners. In 1979, he helped the Ellesmere Port win the Fours Championship during the 1979 season.

Monaghan continued to ride for Ellesmere Port until they disbanded at the end of 1982. He then joined Sheffield Tigers for the 1983 British League season and then Halifax Dukes for the 1984 British League season. He switched back to the National League in 1986, when he joined Mildenhall Fen Tigers and was part of the team that won the National League Four-Team Championship in 1987.

After three seasons at Mildenhall, Monaghan signed for Stoke Potters, where he would spend four years from 1989 until 1992. His time at Stoke included winning the 1989 Pairs championship with Nigel Crabtree and the 1990 Fours championship. His final seasons were spent with Peterborough Panthers (1993 and 1994) and Long Eaton Invaders (1995).
