= Ken Le Breton =

Australian speedway rider

- Born: 15 August 1924; Sydney, New South Wales
- Died: 6 January 1951 (aged 26); Sydney, New South Wales
- Nickname: The White Ghost
- Nationality: Australian

Career history
- 1947: New Cross Rangers
- 1947-1948: Newcastle Diamonds
- 1949-1950: Ashfield Giants

Francis James Le Breton (15 August 1924 in Sydney, New South Wales – 6 January 1951) was an Australian Motorcycle speedway rider who was nicknamed "The White Ghost" due to his wearing white leathers.

== Biography ==
Le Breton served in the Australian Army as a gunner in World War II. His service in New Guinea ended when he was hospitalized with swamp fever (malaria) and battle fatigue. He was discharged in 1945 and took up speedway the following year. He took part in novice trials at the Sydney Sports Ground but failed to impress and was turned away. He then took part in trials at the West Maitland Showground in New South Wales and was immediately noticed by everyone as he appeared with all white leathers and bike. Ray Duggan, who was at the meeting, took an interest in Le Breton and helped him get established back at the Sydney Sports Ground where he rode in all white as "The White Ghost".

Le Breton sailed to the United Kingdom in 1947 to try to get a team place and signed for the New Cross Rangers. Things did not go so well, so the second-division Newcastle Diamonds signed him in exchange for Jeff Lloyd and £1000. He moved with the Newcastle promotion to Glasgow with the Ashfield Giants in 1949 for two seasons until 1950.

== Death ==
Le Breton was involved in a crash on 5 January 1951 at the Sydney Sports Ground, where he first rode a speedway bike. He was representing Australia in the second Test match of the 1950–51 season against England. In heat 18, he was attempting to pass England's Eddie Rigg on the last bend, looking to gain third place, when he cut into Rigg's rear wheel. Le Breton's bike locked and he hit the safety fence hard and straight on. He died the next day in St Vincent's Hospital in Sydney due to severe injuries including a fractured skull and punctured lung.

== World Final Appearance ==
- 1949 - (England) London, Wembley Stadium - 13th - 4pts

== See also ==
- Rider deaths in motorcycle speedway
