= 2005 Australian Individual Speedway Championship =

Australian motorcycle speedway championship

The 2005 Australian Individual Speedway Championship was a motorcycle speedway competition organised by Motorcycling Australia (MA) for the Australian Individual Speedway Championship. The event was held over four rounds.

Leigh Adams won his eighth championship.

== Rounds ==
Round	Date	Venue	Winner
1	29 December '04	Gosford Showground, Gosford	Leigh Adams
2	1 January	Newcastle Showgrounds, Newcastle	Leigh Adams
3	5 January	Gillman Speedway, Adelaide	Leigh Adams
4	8 January	Olympic Park, Mildura	Leigh Adams

== Final classification ==
Pos.	Rider	Total
Gold	Leigh Adams	80
Silver	Jason Lyons	67
Bronze	Steve Johnston	61
4	Charlie Gjedde	60
5	Craig Watson	58
6	Travis McGowan	57
7	Adam Shields	56
8	Mark Lemon	51
9	Rory Schlein	46
10	Kevin Doolan	37
11	Ashley Jones	30
12	Cameron Woodward	29
13	Troy Batchelor	27
14	Matthew Wethers	26
15	Chris Ferguson	11
16	Tom Hedley	5
17	Jason Doyle	4
18	Adam Allott	3

== See also ==
- Australian Individual Speedway Championship
- Australia national speedway team
- Sports in Australia
