= 2006 Australian Individual Speedway Championship =

Australian motorcycle speedway championship

The 2006 Australian Individual Speedway Championship was a motorcycle speedway competition organised by Motorcycling Australia (MA) for the Australian Individual Speedway Championship. The event was held over three rounds.

Leigh Adams won his ninth championship.

== Rounds ==
Round	Date	Venue	Winner
1	6 January	Gillman Speedway, Adelaide	Leigh Adams
2	8 January	Olympic Park, Mildura	Leigh Adams
3	14 January	Newcastle Showgrounds, Newcastle	Leigh Adams

== Final classification ==
Pos.	Rider	Total
Gold	Leigh Adams	60
Silver	Todd Wiltshire	53
Bronze	Rory Schlein	46
4	Adam Shields	45
5	Travis McGowan	41
6	Simon Stead	38
7	Davey Watt	34
8	Troy Batchelor	32
9	Craig Watson	31
10	Jason Doyle	30
11	Kevin Doolan	27
12	Jason Lyons	26
13	Chris Holder	23
14	Robert Ksiezak	19
15	Cameron Woodward	15
16	Mark Jones	11

== See also ==
- Australian Individual Speedway Championship
- Australia national speedway team
- Sports in Australia
