= 2007 Australian Individual Speedway Championship =

Australian motorcycle speedway championship

The 2007 Australian Individual Speedway Championship was a motorcycle speedway competition organised by Motorcycling Australia (MA) for the Australian Individual Speedway Championship. The event was held over five rounds.

Jason Crump won his second championship, 12 years after his first.

== Rounds ==
| Round | Date | Venue | Winner |
|---|---|---|---|
| 1 | 3 January | Newcastle Showgrounds, Newcastle | Jason Crump |
| 2 | 5 January | Sydney Showground Stadium, Sydney | Jason Crump |
| 3 | 10 January | Olympic Park, Mildura | Leigh Adams |
| 4 | 12 January | Gillman Speedway, Adelaide | Leigh Adams |
| 5 | 13 January | Borderline Speedway, Mount Gambier | Jason Crump |

== Final classification ==
| Pos. | Rider | Total |
|---|---|---|
| Gold | Jason Crump | 96 |
| Silver | Leigh Adams | 91 |
| Bronze | Steve Johnston | 75 |
| 4 | Rory Schlein | 73 |
| 5 | Simon Stead | 68 |
| 6 | Scott Nicholls | 67 |
| 7 | Chris Holder | 64 |
| 8 | Jason Doyle | 60 |
| 9 | Mark Lemon | 53 |
| 10 | Travis McGowan | 51 |
| 11 | Cameron Woodward | 42 |
| 12 | Troy Batchelor | 41 |
| 13 | Cory Gathercole | 37 |
| 14 | Tom Hedley | 34 |
| 15 | Trevor Harding | 18 |
| 16 | Ty Proctor | 15 |

== See also ==
- Australian Individual Speedway Championship
- Australia national speedway team
- Sports in Australia
