= 2008 Australian Individual Speedway Championship =

Australian motorcycle speedway championship

The 2008 Australian Individual Speedway Championship was a motorcycle speedway competition organised by Motorcycling Australia (MA) for the Australian Individual Speedway Championship. The event was held over five rounds.

Chris Holder won his first championship.

== Rounds ==
| Round | Date | Venue | Winner |
|---|---|---|---|
| 1 | 29 December '07 | Olympic Park, Mildura | Chris Holder |
| 2 | 2 January | Gillman Speedway, Adelaide | Chris Holder |
| 3 | 5 January | Borderline Speedway, Mount Gambier | Chris Holder |
| 4 | 9 January | Newcastle Showgrounds, Newcastle | Chris Holder |
| 5 | 11 January | Sydney Showground Stadium, Sydney | Chris Holder |

== Final classification ==
| Pos. | Rider | Total |
|---|---|---|
| Gold | Chris Holder | 100 |
| Silver | Troy Batchelor | 86 |
| Bronze | Joe Screen | 78 |
| 4 | Cameron Woodward | 77 |
| 5 | Freddie Lindgren | 77 |
| 6 | Jason Doyle | 73 |
| 7 | Filip Sitera | 58 |
| 8 | Robert Ksiezak | 48 |
| 9 | Cory Gathercole | 43 |
| 10 | Tom Hedley | 37 |
| 11 | Aaron Summers | 36 |
| 12 | Josh Grajczonek | 32 |
| 13 | Travis McGowan | 29 |
| 14 | Trevor Harding | 28 |
| 15 | Ty Proctor | 28 |
| 16 | Lee Herne | 25 |
| 17 | James Holder | 20 |
| 18 | Richard Sweetman | 10 |

== See also ==
- Australian Individual Speedway Championship
- Australia national speedway team
- Sports in Australia
