= 2004 Australian Individual Speedway Championship =

Australian motorcycle speedway championship

The 2004 Australian Individual Speedway Championship was a motorcycle speedway competition organised by Motorcycling Australia (MA) for the Australian Individual Speedway Championship. The event was held over three rounds.

For the first time the Championship was held over several rounds instead of a one-off final. Ryan Sullivan won his first and only championship, after winning all three rounds.

== Rounds ==
Round	Date	Venue	Winner
1	10 January	Gold Coast Speedway, Gold Coast	Ryan Sullivan
2	17 January	Gosford Showground, Gosford	Ryan Sullivan
3	21 January	Olympic Park, Mildura	Ryan Sullivan

== Final classification ==
Pos.	Rider	Total
Gold	Ryan Sullivan	60
Silver	Leigh Adams	54
Bronze	Todd Wiltshire	49
4	Jason Lyons	47
5	Travis McGowan	43
6	John Jørgensen	41
7	Rory Schlein	38
8	Steve Johnston	36
9	Mark Lemon	35
10	Kevin Doolan	35
11	Ashley Jones	25
12	Rusty Harrison	17
13	Nathan Hedley	13
14	Scott Smith	12
15	Trent Leverington	10
16	Dave Booth	7
17	Ben Shields	4
18	Chris Ferguson	3
19	Cory Gathercole	2
20	Leigh Fernance	1
21	James Holder	0
22	Brock Gates	0

== See also ==
- Australian Individual Speedway Championship
- Australia national speedway team
- Sports in Australia
