= 1982 Australian Individual Speedway Championship =

Australian motorcycle speedway championship

The 1982 Australian Individual Speedway Championship was held at the Claremont Speedway in Perth, Western Australia on 15 January 1982.

Sydney rider Billy Sanders won his fourth successive Australian Championship and his third consecutive title. Sanders and fellow Sydney rider Gary Guglielmi finished the meeting on 14 points, with Sanders winning a runoff to claim the title. Local Perth rider Glyn Taylor, the son of 1966 Australian champion Chum Taylor, finished third on 11 points.

== 1982 Australian Solo Championship ==
- Australian Championship
- 15 January 1982
- Perth, Western Australia - Claremont Speedway
- Referee:
- Qualification: The top four riders go through to the Overseas Final in London, England.

Pos.	Rider	Points	Details
Gold	Billy Sanders ( (New South Wales) )	14+3	
Silver	Gary Guglielmi ( (New South Wales) )	14+2	
Bronze	Glyn Taylor ( (Western Australia) )	11	
4	Phil Crump ( (Victoria (state)) )	10+3	
5	Les Sawyer ( (Western Australia) )	10+2	
6	John Titman ( (Queensland) )	9	
7	Steve Regeling ( (Queensland) )	9	
8	Phil Herne ( (New South Wales) )	9	
9	Keith Wright ( (Australia) )	6	
10	John McNeill ( (Victoria (state)) )	5	
11	Rod North ( (Australia) )	8	
12	Danny Kennedy ( (Victoria (state)) )	4	
13	Rob Ashton ( (Western Australia) )	4	
14	Mark Fiora ( (South Australia) )	4	
15	Terry Tulloch ( (Australia) )	4	
16	Rob Townson ( (Australia) )	2	

== See also ==
- Australia national speedway team
- Sport in Australia
- Motorcycle Speedway
