= 2020 Australian Individual Speedway Championship =

Australian motorcycle speedway championship

The 2020 Australian Individual Speedway Championship was a motorcycle speedway competition organised by Motorcycling Australia (MA) for the Australian Individual Speedway Championship. The event was held over four rounds.

Max Fricke won his second consecutive championship.

The first round was due to be held at Loxford Park Speedway in Kurri Kurri on 4 January but was cancelled over track safety concerns.

== Rounds ==
| Round | Date | Venue | Winner |
|---|---|---|---|
| 1 | 6 January | Diamond Park Speedway, Wodonga | Rohan Tungate |
| 2 | 7 January | Undera Park Speedway, Undera | Max Fricke |
| 3 | 9 January | Olympic Park, Mildura | Max Fricke |
| 4 | 11 January | Gillman Speedway, Adelaide | Jack Holder |

== Final classification ==
| Pos. | Rider | DP | UP | OLY | GIL | Total |
|---|---|---|---|---|---|---|
| Gold | Max Fricke | 18 | 19 | 18 | 16 | 71 |
| Silver | Jack Holder | 13 | 12 | 17 | 20 | 62 |
| Bronze | Rohan Tungate | 14 | 17 | 12 | 16 | 59 |
| 4 | Chris Holder | 11 | 14 | 19 | 13 | 57 |
| 5 | Jaimon Lidsey | 19 | 12 | 12 | 12 | 55 |
| 6 | Brady Kurtz | 10 | 15 | 12 | 10 | 47 |
| 7 | Josh Pickering | 9 | 7 | 9 | 13 | 38 |
| 8 | Sam Masters | 12 | 9 | 8 | 8 | 37 |
| 9 | Ryan Douglas | 6 | 7 | 9 | 4 | 26 |
| 10 | Zach Cook | 4 | 8 | 3 | 5 | 20 |
| 11 | Robert Medson | 7 | 2 | 5 | 6 | 20 |
| 12 | Justin Sedgmen | 4 | 5 | 5 | 5 | 19 |
| 13 | Ben Cook | 3 | 4 | 3 | 7 | 16 |
| 14 | Jordan Stewart | 6 | 5 | 4 | 1 | 16 |
| 15 | Jack Morrison | 2 | 2 | 1 | 1 | 6 |
| 16 | Patrick Hamilton | - | - | - | 1 | 1 |
| 17 | Zane Keleher | 0 | - | 0 | 0 | 0 |
| 18 | Declan Knowles | 0 | 0 | - | 0 | 0 |
| 29 | Brauyden McGuinness | - | - | 0 | 0 | 0 |

== See also ==
- Australian Individual Speedway Championship
- Australia national speedway team
- Sports in Australia
