= 2026 Australian Individual Speedway Championship =

Australian motorcycle speedway championship

The 2026 Australian Individual Speedway Championship was a motorcycle speedway competition organised by Motorcycling Australia (MA) for the Australian Individual Speedway Championship.

The event was held over four rounds with the champion being classified with the most points collated from the four rounds. The defending champion Brady Kurtz did not compete.

The title was won by Jack Holder for the second time after claiming all four rounds.

== Rounds ==
Round	Date	Venue	Winner
1	3 January	Diamond Park, Wodonga	Jack Holder
2	3 January	Diamond Park, Wodonga	Jack Holder
3	5 January	Olympic Park, Mildura	Jack Holder
4	8 January	Gillman Speedway, Adelaide	Jack Holder

== Final classification ==
Pos.	Rider	DP	DP	OLY	GIL	Total
Gold	Jack Holder	18	18	18	18	72
Silver	Jaimon Lidsey	18	16	16	14	64
Bronze	Rohan Tungate	14	15	14	18	61
4	Zach Cook	10	12	10	9	41
5	Keynan Rew	9	4	14	12	39
6	Ben Cook	11	14	-	12	37
7	Jacob Hook	9	9	7	6	31
8	Mitchell McDiarmid	8	5	7	10	30
9	Tate Zischke	6	5	10	8	29
10	Justin Sedgmen	6	6	7	7	26
11	Alex Adamson	4	7	7	3	21
12	Jack Morrison	2	6	7	4	19
13	Reid Battye	4	5	4	6	19
14	Lachlan Russell	6	4	4	2	16
15	Dayle Wood	3	2	2	1	8
16	Bradley Page	0	2	-	-	2
17	Ben Whalley	-	-	2	-	2
18	Harrison Ryan	1	0	-	-	1
19	Nick Hohlbein	-	-	1	-	1
20	Will Cairns	-	-	-	1	1

== See also ==
- Australian Individual Speedway Championship
- Australia national speedway team
