= 2025 Australian Individual Speedway Championship =

Australian motorcycle speedway championship

The 2025 Australian Individual Speedway Championship was a motorcycle speedway competition organised by Motorcycling Australia (MA) for the Australian Individual Speedway Championship. The event was held over three rounds with the champion being classified with the most points collated from the three rounds. Initially, there were supposed to be four rounds, but the event at North Brisbane was cancelled due to bad weather.

Rohan Tungate was the defending champion. Jason Doyle, Ryan Douglas and Tate Zischke were ruled out through injury, while former winner Troy Batchelor did not participate.

The title was won by Brady Kurtz, who also claimed the opening two rounds. Kurtz finished 11 points clear of Jack Holder, with Chris Holder completing the podium. It was the second time Kurtz was crowned champion after also winning the 2016 series.

== Rounds ==
Round	Date	Venue	Winner
1	3 January	Gillman Speedway, Adelaide	Brady Kurtz
2	5 January	Olympic Park, Mildura	Brady Kurtz
3	8 January	Diamond Park, Wodonga	Rohan Tungate
4	11 January	North Brisbane Speedway, Banyo	Cancelled due to bad weather

== Final classification ==
Pos.	Rider	GIL	OLY	DP	Total
Gold	Brady Kurtz	18	19	16	53
Silver	Jack Holder	15	14	13	42
Bronze	Chris Holder	15	11	12	38
4	Keynan Rew	13	15	9	37
5	Rohan Tungate	9	11	15	35
6	Ben Cook	6	9	12	27
7	Zach Cook	8	10	8	26
8	Josh Pickering	7	10	8	25
9	Jaimon Lidsey	9	8	6	23
10	James Pearson	3	5	8	16
11	Max Fricke	11	1	-	12
12	Mitchell McDiarmid	5	3	3	11
13	Sam Masters	-	-	10	10
14	Harrison Ryan	4	3	3	10
15	Michael West	3	3	4	10
16	Mitchell Cluff	2	2	3	7
17	Patrick Hamilton	2	3	-	5
18	Dayle Wood	-	1	-	1
19	Harry Sadler	0	0	-	0
20	Alex Adamson	-	-	0	0

== See also ==
- Australian Individual Speedway Championship
- Australia national speedway team
