= Australian Solo Championship =

Australian motorcycle speedway championship

Australian Championship
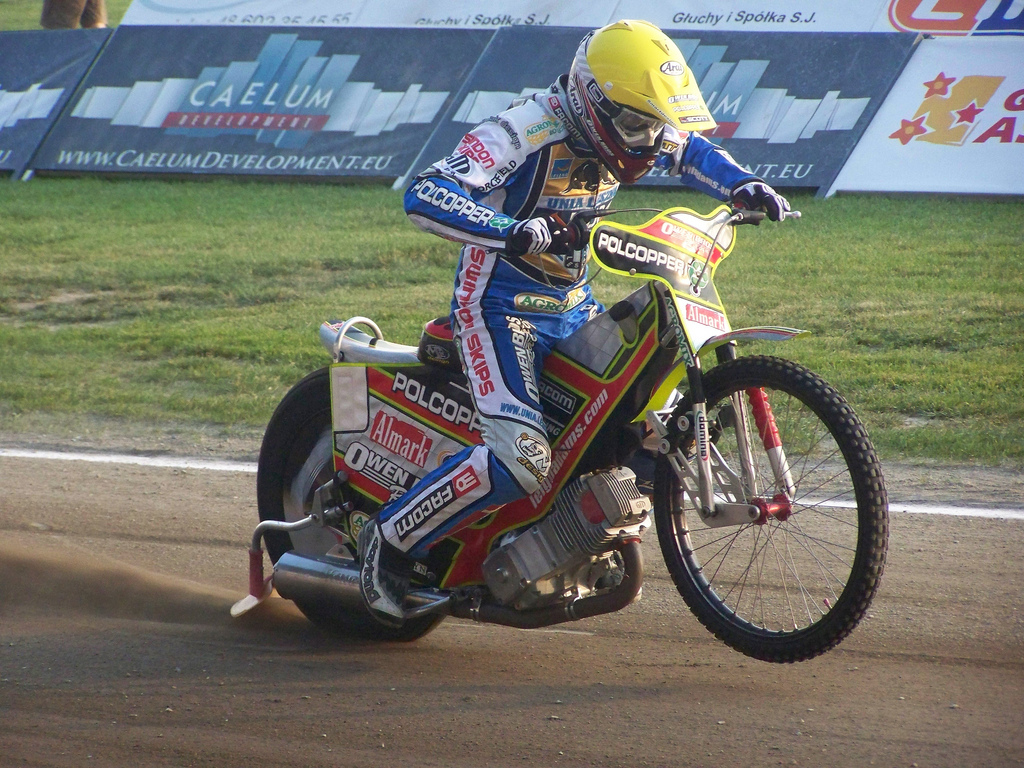
- Leigh Adams, ten time winner
- Sport: Motorcycle speedway
- Founded: 1926
- Most titles: Leigh Adams (10)

The Australian Individual Speedway Championship historically known as the Australian Solo Championship is a motorcycle speedway championship held each year to determine the Australian national champion. It is organised by Motorcycling Australia (MA) and is the oldest continuously running national speedway championship in the world, having been run since 1926 with the exception of 1942-1945 when racing was suspended during World War II and 1955-1961 when the championship was not held.

== History ==
The first Championship in 1926 was held at the Newcastle Showground in Newcastle, which was won by American rider Cecil Brown. In the early years of the championship, multiple Australian titles were often held in the same year with some riders winning more than one title per year. Championships were run over anywhere from 2 to 6 laps and/or over 2 miles, often depending on the length of the track used.

Legendary Danish rider Ole Olsen and Australia's own Jason Crump are the only riders who have won the championship while being the reigning Speedway World Champion. Olsen's controversial win at the Liverpool Speedway in Sydney in 1976 was the last win by a non-Australian rider. His win was controversial as many of the riders at the meeting protested his eligibility because of his nationality. However, with Olsen available to ride the promoters of the speedway insisted on his inclusion knowing that he would draw a larger crowd.

From 1979 to 1994, the Championship served as a qualifying round for the Speedway World Championship.

== Past winners ==
=== Multiple championship era ===
Year	Distance	Venue	Winner	Runner-up	3rd place
1926	6 laps	Newcastle Showground	Cecil Brown ( (United States) )	Mick Brennan (NSW)	Roy Hindle (NSW)
1927	4 laps	Newcastle Showground	Pat Hamilton (NSW)	Tom Sharp	Ted Rees (NSW)
1927	3 laps	Newcastle Showground	Paddy Dean (NSW)	Ted Rees (NSW)	Harold Murdoch (NSW)
1927	4 laps	Newcastle Showground	Ted Rees (NSW)	Billy Lamont (NSW)	Sprouts Elder ( (United States) )
1928	3 laps	Claremont Speedway	Sig Schlam (WA)	Alby Taylor (SA)	Harry Mangham (SA)
1928	6 laps	Wayville Showgrounds	Alby Taylor (SA)	Vic Huxley (Qld)	Sprouts Elder ( (United States) )
1929	3 laps	Wayville Showgrounds	Frank Duckett (SA)	Paddy Dean (NSW)	Tommy Benstead (NSW)
1929	2¾hp/4 laps	Davies Park	Frank Pearce (Qld)	Frank Arthur (NSW)	
1929	3½hp/4 laps	Davies Park	Max Grosskreutz (Qld)	Alby Taylor (SA)	Frank Pearce (Qld)
1929	2 miles	Claremont Speedway	Sig Schlam (WA)	Cec Walker (WA)	Syd Parsons (SA)
1930	3 laps	Wayville Showgrounds	Jack Chapman (SA)	Jack Ormston ( (England) )	Frank Arthur (NSW)
1930	6 laps	Claremont Speedway	Arthur Atkinson ( (England) )	Jack Chapman (SA)	Bill Dunne (WA)
1930	2 miles	Exhibition Speedway	Reg West (Vic)	Lionel Davey (Qld)	Len Woods (Vic)
1931	2 laps	Melbourne Motordrome	Harold Hastings (Qld)	Max Grosskreutz (Qld)	Frank Duckett (SA)
1931	4 laps	Bathurst Sports Ground	Harold Murdoch (NSW)	Ken Kirkman (NSW)	Bruce Webb (NSW)
1931	6 laps	Wayville Showgrounds	Ray Tauscher ( (United States) )	Jack Hanson (SA)	Laurie Packer (SA)
1932	2 laps	Cumberland Oval	Wally Little (NSW)	Ken Kirkman (NSW)	Jim McMahon (NSW)
1932	3 laps	Wayville Showgrounds	Arnie Hansen (SA)	Max Grosskreutz (Qld)	Dick Wise (SA)
1932	4 laps	Exhibition Speedway	Bill Rogers (NSW)	Lionel Davey (Qld)	Frank Apted (Vic)
1933		Exhibition Speedway	Larry Boulton ( (England) )	Bert Spencer (Qld)	Jack Bibby (Vic)
1934		Brisbane Exhibition Ground	Vic Huxley (Qld)	George Greenwood ( (England) )	Frank Arthur (NSW)
1935		Sydney Showground	Bluey Wilkinson (NSW)	Tiger Stevenson ( (England) )	Frank Varey ( (England) )
1936		Sydney Showground	Max Grosskreutz (Qld)	Vic Huxley (Qld)	Jack Milne ( (United States) )
1937		Sydney Showground	Jack Milne ( (United States) )	Wilbur Lamoreaux ( (United States) )	Vic Duggan (NSW)
1938	3 laps	Sydney Showground	Bluey Wilkinson (NSW)	Jack Milne ( (United States) )	Joe Abbott ( (England) )
1938	4 laps	Sydney Showground	Bluey Wilkinson (NSW)	Wilbur Lamoreaux ( (United States) )	Clem Mitchell (SA)
1938	5 laps	Camden Motordrome	Jack Parker ( (England) )	Cordy Milne ( (United States) )	Frank Woodroofe (SA)
1939 not held
1940		Sydney Showground	Cordy Milne ( (United States) )	Vic Duggan (NSW)	Lionel Van Praag (NSW)
1941		Sydney Sports Ground	Vic Duggan (NSW)	Lionel Van Praag (NSW)	Max Grosskreutz (Qld)
1942-1945 not held
1946		Sydney Sports Ground	Frank Dolan	Lionel Van Praag (NSW)	Bill Rogers (NSW)
1947	2 laps	Tracey's Speedway	Bill Rogers (NSW)	Lionel Van Praag (NSW)	Aub Lawson (NSW)
1947	3 laps	Sydney Sports Ground	Vic Duggan (NSW)	Lionel Van Praag (NSW)	Ray Duggan (NSW)
1947	4 laps	Brisbane Exhibition Ground	Andy Menzies (Vic)	Charlie Spinks (Qld)	Keith Cox (Qld)
1948	2 laps	Sydney Showground	Vic Duggan (NSW)	Max Grosskreutz (Qld)	Bill Melluish
1948	3 laps	Sydney Sports Ground	Vic Duggan (NSW)	Norman Parker ( (England) )	Max Grosskreutz (Qld)
1948	2 laps	Sydney Showground	Vic Duggan (NSW)	Aub Lawson (NSW)	Ray Duggan (NSW); Alec Statham ( (England) )
1949	2 laps	Sydney Showground	Aub Lawson (NSW)	Jack Biggs (Vic)	Graham Warren (Qld); Eric Chitty ( (Canada) )
1949	4 laps	Brisbane Exhibition Ground	Aub Lawson (NSW)	Bill Rogers (NSW)	Charlie Spinks (Qld)
1950	2 laps	Sydney Sports Ground	Aub Lawson (NSW)	Graham Warren (Qld)	Jack Biggs (Vic)
1950	3 laps	Tracey's Speedway	Bill Kitchen ( (England) )	Bill Longley (Vic)	Aub Lawson (NSW); Jack Biggs (Vic)
1950	4 laps	Sydney Showground	Jack Parker ( (England) )	Aub Lawson (NSW)	Bill Longley (Vic)
1950	cofc	Sydney Sports Ground	Aub Lawson (NSW)	Jack Parker ( (England) )	Jack Biggs (Vic)
1951	3 laps	Sydney Showground	Jack Parker ( (England) )	Keith Ryan (NSW)	Aub Lawson (NSW)
1951	4 laps	Sydney Sports Ground	Jack Parker ( (England) )	Aub Lawson (NSW); Tommy Miller ( (Scotland) )	
1951	cofc	Brisbane Exhibition Ground	Jack Parker ( (England) )	Aub Lawson (NSW)	Tommy Miller ( (Scotland) )
1952	2 laps	Maitland Showground	Keith Ryan (NSW)	Aub Lawson (NSW); Lionel Levy (NSW)	
1952	3 laps	Sydney Showground	Keith Ryan (NSW)	Jack Parker ( (England) ) Lionel Levy (NSW)	
1952	4 laps	Sydney Sports Ground	Lionel Levy (NSW)	Aub Lawson (NSW)	Jack Parker ( (England) )
1952	cofc	Brisbane Exhibition Ground	Aub Lawson (NSW)	Lionel Levy (NSW)	Keith Ryan (NSW)
1953	3 laps	Sydney Showground	Aub Lawson (NSW)	Lionel Levy (NSW)	Allan Quinn (NSW)
1953	4 laps	Sydney Sports Ground	Lionel Levy (NSW)	Aub Lawson (NSW)	Don Lawson (NSW)
1953	cofc	Brisbane Exhibition Ground	Aub Lawson (NSW)	Lionel Levy (NSW)	Keith Ryan (NSW)
1954	3 laps	Sydney Sports Ground	Aub Lawson (NSW)	Ken McKinlay ( (Scotland) )	Lionel Levy (NSW)
1954	cofc	Sydney Sports Ground	Aub Lawson (NSW)	Lionel Levy (NSW)	Rune Sörmander ( (Sweden) )

Key

- cofc (Champion of champions)

=== Single championship ===
Year	Venue	Winner	Runner-up	3rd place
1962	Rockhampton Showgrounds	Bob Sharp (NSW)	Ivan Mauger ( (New Zealand) )	Keith Gurtner (Qld)
1963	Rockhampton Showgrounds	Mike Broadbank ( (England) )	Keith Gurtner (Qld)	Ivan Mauger ( (New Zealand) )
1964	Sydney Showground	Ken McKinlay ( (Scotland) )	Jack Scott (SA)	Ray Cresp (Vic)
1965	Sydney Showground	Bob Sharp (NSW)	Brian Collins (NSW)	Bill Bryden (NSW)
1966	Rowley Park	Chum Taylor (WA)	Jimmy Gooch ( (England) )	Dennis Gavros (SA)
1967	Rowley Park	Jack Scott (SA)	Göte Nordin ( (Sweden) )	Ken McKinlay ( (Scotland) )
1968	Sydney Showground	Jim Airey (NSW)	Nigel Boocock ( (England) )	Eric Boocock ( (England) )
1969	Sydney Showground	Jim Airey (NSW)	Ken McKinlay ( (Scotland) ) Jack White (Qld); Greg Kentwell (NSW)	
1970	Sydney Showground	Jim Airey (NSW)	John Boulger (SA)	Kevin Torpie (Vic)
1971	Claremont Speedway	John Boulger (SA)	Bob O'Leary (WA)	John Langfield (NSW)
1972	Rowley Park	Jim Airey (NSW)	Ole Olsen ( (Denmark) )	John Boulger (SA)
1973	Sydney Showground	John Boulger (SA)	John Langfield (NSW)	Billy Sanders (NSW)
1974	Brisbane Exhibition Ground	Steve Reinke (Qld)	John Boulger (SA)	John Titman (Qld)
1975	Sydney Showground	Phil Crump (Vic)	John Titman (Qld)	Phil Herne (NSW)
1976	Liverpool Speedway	Ole Olsen ( (Denmark) )	Phil Crump (Vic)	Billy Sanders (NSW)
1977	Brisbane Exhibition Ground	John Titman (Qld)	Phil Crump (Vic)	Billy Sanders (NSW)
1978	Claremont Speedway	Billy Sanders (NSW)	Phil Herne (NSW)	Lloyd Cross (WA)
1979	Olympic Park	Phil Crump (Vic)	Danny Kennedy (Vic)	John Boulger (SA)
1980	Sydney Showground	Billy Sanders (NSW)	Phil Crump (Vic)	John Titman (Qld)
1981	Brisbane Exhibition Ground	Billy Sanders (NSW)	Phil Crump (Vic)	John Titman (Qld)
1982	Claremont Speedway	Billy Sanders (NSW)	Gary Guglielmi (NSW)	Glyn Taylor (WA)
1983	Speedway Park	Billy Sanders (NSW)	Glyn Taylor (WA)	Phil Crump (Vic)
1984	Olympic Park	Phil Crump (Vic)	Billy Sanders (NSW)	Gary Guglielmi (NSW)
1985	Pioneer Park Speedway	Billy Sanders (NSW)	Phil Crump (Vic)	Stan Bear (Qld)
1986	Pioneer Park Speedway	Troy Butler (Qld)	John Titman (Qld)	Alan Rivett (NSW)
1987	Olympic Park	Steve Regeling (Qld)	Steve Baker (SA)	Glyn Taylor (WA)
1988	Riverview Speedway	Phil Crump (Vic)	Steve Regeling (Qld)	Craig Hodgson (SA)
1989	Newcastle Motordrome	Glenn Doyle (WA)	Stephen Davies (NSW)	Jamie Fagg (NT)
1990	Brisbane Exhibition Ground	Glenn Doyle (WA)	Leigh Adams (Vic)	Stephen Davies (NSW)
1991	Arunga Park Speedway	Craig Boyce (NSW)	Glenn Doyle (WA)	Glyn Taylor (WA)
1992	North Arm Speedway	Leigh Adams (Vic)	Shane Parker (SA)	Mark Carlson (Qld)
1993	Brisbane Exhibition Ground	Leigh Adams (Vic)	Jason Lyons (Vic)	Shane Bowes (SA)
1994	Olympic Park	Leigh Adams (Vic)	Jason Lyons (Vic)	Jason Crump (Vic)
1995	Gosford Speedway	Jason Crump (Vic)	Craig Boyce (NSW)	Leigh Adams (Vic)
1996	Newcastle Motordrome	Craig Boyce (NSW)	Jason Crump (Vic)	Tony Langdon (Qld)
1997	Brisbane Exhibition Ground	Craig Boyce (NSW)	Jason Crump (Vic)	Ryan Sullivan (SA)
1998	Riverview Speedway	Leigh Adams (Vic)	Jason Lyons (Vic)	Jason Crump (Vic)
1999	Olympic Park	Todd Wiltshire (NSW)	Jason Lyons (Vic)	Nigel Sadler (SA)
2000	Gosford Speedway	Leigh Adams (Vic)	Mark Lemon (Vic)	Todd Wiltshire (NSW)
2001	Riverview Speedway	Todd Wiltshire (NSW)	Leigh Adams (Vic)	Mick Poole (NSW)
2002	Wayville Showgrounds	Leigh Adams (Vic)	Jason Crump (Vic)	Ryan Sullivan (SA)
2003	Gosford Speedway	Leigh Adams (Vic)	Todd Wiltshire (NSW)	Craig Watson (NSW)
2004	3 rounds	Ryan Sullivan (SA)	Leigh Adams (Vic)	Todd Wiltshire (NSW)
2005	4 rounds	Leigh Adams (Vic)	Jason Lyons (Vic)	Steve Johnston (WA)
2006	3 rounds	Leigh Adams (Vic)	Todd Wiltshire (NSW)	Rory Schlein (SA)
2007	5 rounds	Jason Crump (Vic)	Leigh Adams (Vic)	Steve Johnston (WA)
2008	5 rounds	Chris Holder (NSW)	Troy Batchelor (Qld)	Joe Screen ( (England) )
2009	3 rounds	Leigh Adams (Vic)	Chris Holder (NSW)	Rory Schlein (SA)
2010	3 rounds	Chris Holder (NSW)	Troy Batchelor (SA)	Darcy Ward (Qld)
2011	4 rounds	Chris Holder (NSW)	Darcy Ward (Qld)	Davey Watt (Qld)
2012	3 rounds	Chris Holder (NSW)	Davey Watt (Qld)	Cameron Woodward (Vic)
2013	3 rounds	Troy Batchelor (SA)	Dakota North (Vic)	Cameron Woodward (Vic)
2014	3 rounds	Chris Holder (NSW)	Jason Doyle (NSW)	Josh Grajczonek (Qld)
2015	4 rounds	Jason Doyle (NSW)	Sam Masters (NSW)	Justin Sedgmen (Vic)
2016	4 rounds	Brady Kurtz (NSW)	Sam Masters (NSW)	Max Fricke (Vic)
2017	4 rounds	Sam Masters (NSW)	Justin Sedgmen (Vic)	Davey Watt (Qld)
2018	4 rounds	Rohan Tungate (NSW)	Brady Kurtz (NSW)	Max Fricke (Vic)
2019	5 rounds	Max Fricke (Vic)	Rohan Tungate (NSW)	Chris Holder (NSW)
2020	4 rounds	Max Fricke (Vic)	Jack Holder (NSW)	Rohan Tungate (NSW)
2021 cancelled due to COVID-19
2022	Gillman Speedway	Max Fricke	Justin Sedgmen	Tate Zischke
2023	4 rounds	Jack Holder	Jason Doyle	Max Fricke
2024	5 rounds	Rohan Tungate	Max Fricke	Jack Holder
2025	3 rounds	Brady Kurtz	Jack Holder	Chris Holder
2026	4 rounds	Jack Holder	Jaimon Lidsey	Rohan Tungate

== Medals classification (2 or more titles) ==
Pos	Rider	Gold	Silver	Bronze
1.	Leigh Adams	10	4	1
2.	Aub Lawson	9	7	3
3.	Billy Sanders	6	1	3
4.	Jack Parker	5	2	1
5.	Chris Holder	5	1	2
6.	Vic Duggan	5	1	1
7.	Phil Crump	4	4	1
8.	Jim Airey	4		
9.	Craig Boyce	3	1	
10.	Max Fricke	3		3
11.	Bluey Wilkinson	3		
12.	Lionel Levy	2	6	1
13.	Jason Crump	2	3	2
14.	John Boulger	2	2	2
	Todd Wiltshire	2	2	2
16.	Jack Holder	2	2	1
17.	Max Grosskreutz	2	2	
18.	Keith Ryan	2	1	2
19.	Glenn Doyle	2	1	
	Brady Kurtz	2	1	
21.	Pat Hamilton	2		
	Sig Schlam	2		
	Bob Sharp	2		

== See also ==
- Motorsport in Australia
- New South Wales Individual Speedway Championship
- Western Australian Individual Speedway Championship
- Victorian Individual Speedway Championship
- South Australian Individual Speedway Championship
- Queensland Solo Championship

== Statistics ==
- Jack Milne of the USA won the 1937 Australian Championship and later that year won the 1937 World Championship. Bluey Wilkinson won the 3 & 4 Lap Australian Championships in 1938 before also going on to win the World Championship later that year, Chris Holder also won both the 2012 Australian and World Championships.
- Leigh Adams was the reigning Under-21 World Champion when he won his second straight Australian title in 1993. Jason Crump would win his first Australian title in 1995 and later that year won the 1995 U/21 World Championship.
- Adams also became the first reigning Australian Under-21 Champion to win the senior title when he won his first championship in 1992. Chris Holder became just the second rider to hold both titles at the same time in 2008
- Phil and Jason Crump are the only father/son combination to win the Australian Solo Championship.
- Billy Sanders holds the record for most title wins in a row, winning four in a row from 1980 to 1983. Sanders also won in 1978 and 1985 giving him 6 titles in 8 years, but lost his title in both 1979 and 1984 to Phil Crump. Vic Duggan (1941, 1947, 1948 [x3]) and Chris Holder (2008, 2010, 2011, 2012, 2014) have both won 5 Australian Championships.
- Leigh Adams holds the record for most title wins overall with 10. Aub Lawson holds the record for most podiums with 19 between 1947 and 1954. Lawson's total includes his record of 4 wins in the Champion of Champions (1950, 1952, 1953 and 1954) and his second place in the 1951 Champion of Champions.
- Mildura rider Jason Lyons holds the dubious record of having finished second the most number of times (5 - 1993, 1994, 1998, 1999 & 2005) without ever having won the Australian Championship.
- The winner of the Championship receives the Billy Sanders Memorial Trophy, named after the speedway rider Billy Sanders.
