= 2002 Australian Individual Speedway Championship =

Australian motorcycle speedway championship

The 2002 Australian Individual Speedway Championship was a motorcycle speedway competition organised by Motorcycling Australia (MA) for the Australian Individual Speedway Championship. The event was held over three rounds.

Leigh Adams won the championship for the sixth time.

== Details ==
- Venue - Wayville Showgrounds, Adelaide
- Date - 16 February 2002

== Final classification ==
Pos.	Rider	Total/final
Gold	Leigh Adams	20+5
Silver	Jason Crump	14+4
Bronze	Ryan Sullivan	18+3
4	Todd Wiltshire	16+2
5	Mick Poole	14+1
6	Steve Johnston	16+0
7	Travis McGowan	13+5
8	Kevin Doolan	9+4
9	Craig Watson	6+3
10	Mark Lemon	10+2
11	Rusty Harrison	8+1
12	Nigel Sadler	13+0
13	Davey Watt	5+5
14	Brett Woodifield	4+4
15	Ford Keane	3+3
16	Guy Wilson	3+2
17	Jonathan White	2+1
18	Jason Lyons	5+x
19	Nathan Hedley	1

== See also ==
- Australian Individual Speedway Championship
- Australia national speedway team
- Sports in Australia
