= 2022 Australian Individual Speedway Championship =

Australian motorcycle speedway championship

The 2022 Australian Individual Speedway Championship was the 2022 motorcycle speedway edition of the Australian Individual Speedway Championship, organised by Motorcycling Australia (MA). The event was held over just one round because of the problems caused by the COVID-19 pandemic.

Max Fricke won the Australian title for the third successive time, despite the issues since his last win. The final was due to be held in January 2022 but was delayed by eleven months to December 2022 and this also followed the cancellation of the 2021 edition.

The field was also severely weakened, with the non-participation of five former Australian champions, Jason Doyle, Chris Holder, Brady Kurtz, Sam Masters and Rohan Tungate.

== Rounds ==
- Venue - Gillman Speedway, Adelaide
- Date - 10 December 2022

== Final classification ==
| Pos. | Rider | Total/sf/f |
|---|---|---|
| Gold | Max Fricke | 15+3+3 |
| Silver | Justin Sedgmen | 12+3+2 |
| Bronze | Tate Zischke | 10+2+2 |
| 4 | Keynan Rew | 10+2+0 |
| 5 | James Pearson | 9+1 |
| 6 | Fraser Bowes | 9+1 |
| 7 | Jaimon Lidsey | 11+0 |
| 8 | Zach Cook | 11+0 |
| 9 | Zane Keleher | 8 |
| 10 | Michael West | 7 |
| 11 | Maurice Brown | 5 |
| 12 | Jack Morrison | 4 |
| 13 | Cooper Riordan | 3 |
| 14 | Dayle Wood | 3 |
| 15 | Aden Clare | 2 |
| 16 | Jake Turner | 1 |
| 17 | Broc Hall | 0 |

== See also ==
- Australian Individual Speedway Championship
- Australia national speedway team
- Sports in Australia
