= Billy Sanders =

Australian speedway rider

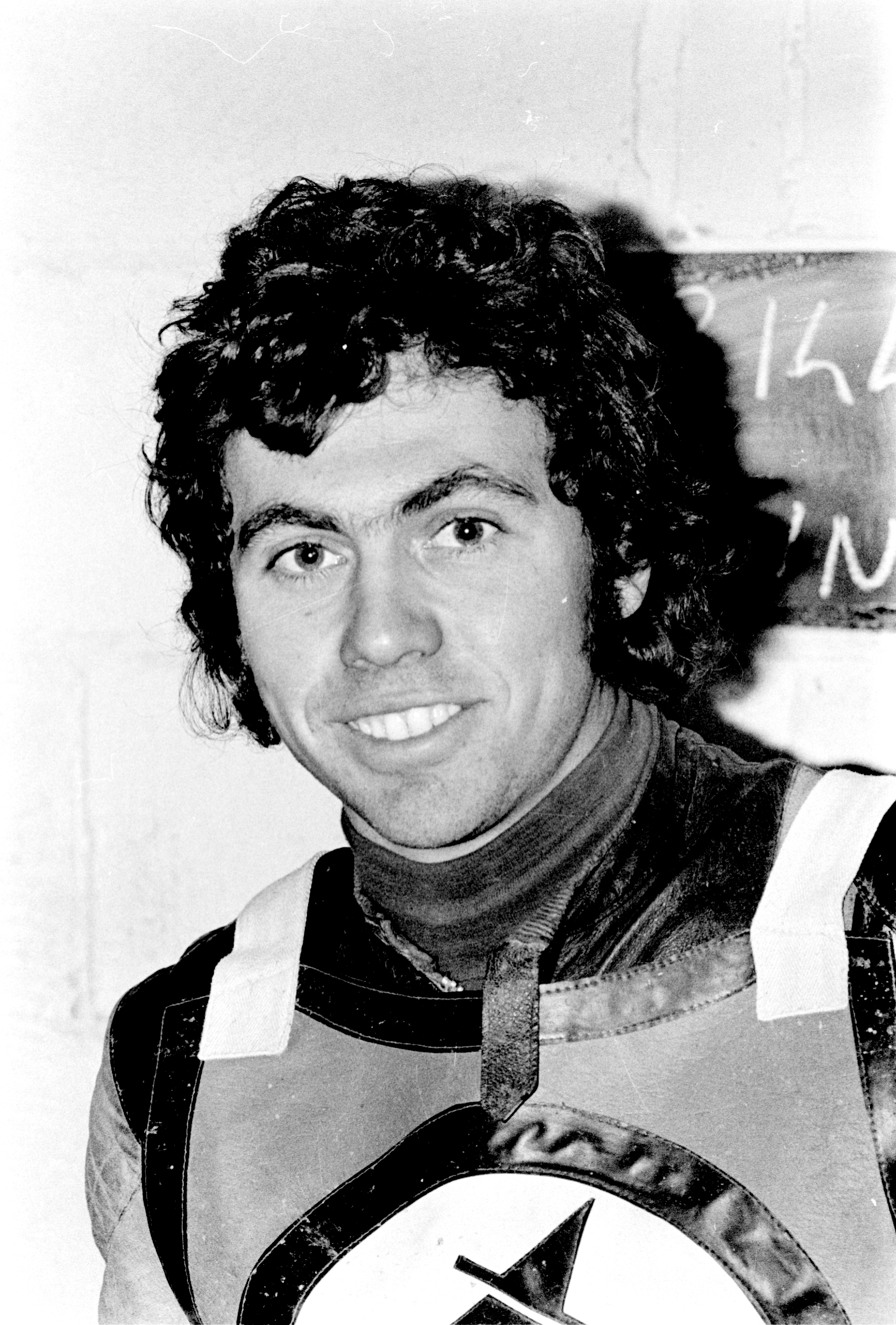
- Born: 9 September 1955; Sydney, New South Wales
- Died: 23 April 1985 (aged 29); Ipswich, England
- Nationality: Australian

Career history
- 1972–1978, 1979–1980, 1983–1985: Ipswich Witches
- 1979: Birmingham Brummies
- 1981: Hull Vikings
- 1982: King's Lynn Stars

Individual honours
- 1978, 1980, 1981, 1982, 1983, 1985: Australian Champion
- 1975: Pride of the Midlands winner
- 1977, 1978, 1979, 1980, 1981, 1982, 1984, 1985: NSW State Champion
- 1979, 1980: Australasian Champion
- 1984, 1985: Australian Masters winner
- 1985: North Arm Classic winner
- 1976, 1978, 1979: Golden Sovereign winner
- 1977: Daily Express Spring Classic
- 1977: Olympique
- 1980: Daily Mirror/Weslake 16-Lapper

Team honours
- 1976: World Team Cup
- 1975, 1976, 1984: British League Champion
- 1976, 1978, 1984: British League KO Cup winner
- 1976, 1977: British League Pairs Champion
- 1976: Spring Gold Cup

William Robert Sanders (9 September 1955 – 23 April 1985) was an Australian international Speedway rider who won six Australian Championships and was a five time Speedway World Championship finalist with a career best second place in West Germany in 1983.

== Early life and family ==
Billy Sanders was born in the Windsor Private Hospital in Sydney to Bill and Bonnie Sanders on 9 September 1955. He attended Rooty Hill High School and with a group of friends joined the local country fire service. When life at school became boring, Billy and his mates would sneak out during recess and light a scrub fire in the neighbouring paddocks, then return to school and wait for the siren to signal that the school was closed for the day because of the fire.

== Australian Speedway ==
On advice from his father, Sanders bought his first speedway bike, a second hand JAP, from a man named Bruce Gardiner rather than going to the expense of buying a brand new Jawa. The bike was one previously owned by five time Australian champion Aub Lawson and Sanders used it to hone his skills at the Nepean Speedway in Sydney's outer north-west during 1969/70. He then went on to make his competition debut at the Liverpool Speedway in Sydney on 4 July 1971 in a winter meeting, quickly becoming a crowd favourite. He also competed at Sydney's other major speedway, the famous Sydney Showground Speedway against riders such as Australian and NSW Champion Jim Airey. A regular competitor at both Liverpool and the Showground, Sanders would consider both speedway's as his home tracks.

Sanders first made Australian speedways fans take notice by finishing in third place in the 1973 Australian Championship held at the Sydney Showground when he was only 18 years old behind winner John Boulger from Adelaide and fellow Sydney rider John Langfield. He again finished third in both 1976 and 1977 before winning the first of a then record six Australian Championships at Claremont Speedway in Perth. He would also win the Aussie title in 1980 (Sydney Showground), 1981 (Brisbane Exhibition Ground), 1982 (Claremont) and 1983 (Speedway Park, Adelaide, where he famously told the unruly crowd that after the reception he got he might consider changing nationalities. He told the crowd to "Get Stuffed" at the end of his victory speech while being booed unfairly following the unpopular decision to exclude crowd favourite Phil Crump in their heat clash, costing Crump the title). His run ended in 1984 when he finished second to local hero Crump at Olympic Park in Mildura, a track Sanders had previously admitted was the one Aussie track he never quite came to grips with.

Sanders regained his Australian crown and won his sixth and last Australian Championship in 1985 at the Pioneer Park Speedway in Ayr in Queensland, where he would reverse the previous years result by defeating Crump, with Queensland's Stan Bear finishing third. Sadly, this was to be Sanders last Australian championship win as he died in England three months later. The Australian Speedway Championship now incorporates the "Billy Sanders Memorial Trophy" in recognition of his six championship wins. His record of six national championship wins stood until 2003 when Victoria's Leigh Adams won his seventh title. Adams would go on to record another three title wins taking the record number to ten wins.

Sanders also had a virtual stranglehold on the NSW State Championship, and would win all of his record eight titles from 1977 until 1985, with the exception of 1983 when the title wasn't held. He also won the 1984 and 1985 Australian Masters titles at his home track at Liverpool. Both Masters finals were held over ten laps and included the top-ten riders at the meetings. He also won the North Arm Classic at the North Arm Speedway in Adelaide (his first appearance in Adelaide since his infamous speech at the 1983 Aussie title). It would prove to be his last appearance in Adelaide and his only time at the tight North Arm track.

Sanders won the Australasian Championship in 1979 at the Rowley Park Speedway in Adelaide, and again in 1980 at the Ruapuna Speedway in Templeton, New Zealand.

In addition to riding, Sanders also wrote a regular column for Australian motorcycle magazine Motorcycle News during the 1970s.

== England ==
Sanders was signed by Ipswich Witches Manager/promoter John Berry in 1972 at the age of 16 and stayed with them until 1980. There he was British League Champion in both 1975 and 1976 and finished in third place in 1974. He was also British League Knockout Cup winner in both 1976 and 1978 and was the British League Pairs Champion in 1976 and 1977 paired with John Louis. Sanders also won the Pride of the Midlands trophy in 1975 at the Monmore Green speedway in Wolverhampton.

In 1979, Sanders not only rode for the Witches, but also for the Birmingham Brummies. He left Ipswich in 1981, signing for the Hull Vikings for £15,000 in a three-rider deal that saw American's Dennis Sigalos and John Cook head in the opposite direction. The pair helped the Witches win the Knockout Cup.

In 1982, Sanders rode for the King's Lynn Stars before returning to Ipswich in 1983, helping the Witches to finish runners up in the British League before going one better for his third and final British League title in 1984. He also won a third and final League KO Cup title in 1984 with Ipswich.

Sanders continued to ride for the Ipswich Witches until his death in April 1985 at the age of just 29.

== International career ==
Sanders teamed with fellow Aussie Phil Crump to finish in fourth place in his first ever World Final appearance at the 1976 Speedway World Pairs Championship held in Eskilstuna, Sweden. He then represented Australia at the 1976 Speedway World Team Cup at London's White City Stadium. Along with team captain John Boulger, Sanders joined Phil Crump, Phil Herne and reserve Garry Middleton to win his only World championship as Australia scored 31 points (Sanders scored 7) to defeat Poland (28), Sweden (26), and the Soviet Union (11).

Sanders first qualified for the Speedway World Championship final in 1977 at the Ullevi Stadium in Gothenburg, Sweden finishing in ninth place with 7 points. He also again teamed with Crump in the 1977 World Pairs Championship finishing in seventh and last place at Hyde Road in Manchester. Sanders had a disappointing World Pairs final at Hyde Road, finishing with just 2 points from his five rides. He retired from his first race, again failed to finish his second, was excluded from his third, before scoring two third place and one last place finish in his final three rides.

Sanders missed out on qualifying for the 1978 final at the Wembley Stadium after only finishing 8th in the Australasian Final in Auckland, but qualified for the 1979 World Final in Poland and finished in a strong fourth place. Sanders finished on 11 points along with England's emerging star Michael Lee, American Kelly Moran and defending champion Ole Olsen from Denmark, with the four riders racing in a run-off for third and fourth places. Lee won the run-off from Sanders, Moran and Olsen.

Sanders finished in third place in the 1980 Individual Speedway World Championship, again in Gothenburg, behind English pair Michael Lee and Dave Jessup. Despite winning the Australian title in 1981 and 1982, Sanders failed to qualify for either the 1981 or 1982 World Finals.

In 1982, Sanders again represented Australia in the World Pairs Championship, this time held at his home track of Liverpool in Sydney, the first time any official Speedway World Championship final had been held in Australia (an unofficial Individual World Championship had been held at the Sydney Showground in 1933). Teaming with fellow Liverpool rider and runner up to Sanders in the Australian Championship Gary Guglielmi, the pair finished in a disappointing fourth place after being among the favourites before the meeting.

Sanders finished in a best ever second place at the 1983 Individual World Championship held in Norden, West Germany, behind local favourite Egon Müller. Despite being in good form going into the World Final, Sanders was expected to challenge for what was called the most open Final in years as defending champion Bruce Penhall had retired from the sport and the pair who had dominated the sport in the 1970s Ivan Mauger and Ole Olsen were at the end of their careers and considered past their best (Mauger failed to qualify in 1983 while Olsen appeared in his last World Final). Müller was unbeaten in his five rides for a 15-point maximum while Sanders was second with 12 points with two wins and three second-place finishes, 1980 champion Michael Lee finished third on 11 points with three wins, one second, and one last place finish.

Sanders also represented Australia again at the World Pairs Final held in Gothenburg, and again teamed with Guglielmi after Phil Crump had declined to ride in the meeting. Sanders and Gugliemi finished in second place in the World Pairs, giving him a rare second place double in the 1983 Speedway World Finals. Billy was the form rider at the World Pairs Final, winning five of his six rides. His second last ride, against an out of form West German team (Müller and Karl Maier), saw him lead into the first turn, only to fall and cause the race to be stopped. As the reason for the stoppage, Sanders was excluded by the referee of the meeting, Australian Sam Bass, with Gugliemi winning the re-run from Maier and Müller. Had Sanders not fallen, its likely he would have gone on to win the race with Gugliemi finishing second (Gugliemi was second going into the turn). This would have seen Australia win the championship, instead of finishing just one point behind the England pairing of Peter Collins and Kenny Carter. Ironically, earlier in the meeting Bass had allowed Collins to restart Heat 10 against Denmark's Erik Gundersen and Hans Nielsen after he had also fallen in the first turn, with video evidence suggesting that like Sanders, Collins simply misjudged the slick track and fell. Had Collins been excluded, the two points he gained from the heat would have been gone and Australia would have had its first World Pairs Championship win.

Sanders qualified for the 1984 Individual World Final, again held in Gothenburg. This was to be his last World Final and it ended in disappointment as Sanders finished in eleventh place, scoring just five points from his five rides. At the time, Sanders held the four lap track record at Ullevi, which along with his 1983 form had seen him as one of the favourites for the title. For the third year in a row, he would team with Guglielmi in the World Pairs Final, this time held in Lonigo, Italy, though they were unable to repeat or better their 1983 second-place finish and slipped to fifth place.

== Death ==
Sanders killed himself near his home in Ipswich. At the time, he was suffering serious financial difficulties and had recently split from his wife. His body was identified by Ipswich promoter John Berry, who had acted as Sanders' legal guardian when he had joined the Witches as a 16-year-old in 1972. Berry would later call it his worst off-track experience in speedway. The lesson at his funeral was read by former World Champion Bruce Penhall, who was a close personal friend and the godfather of Sanders' two children. His ashes were flown back to Australia where they are buried in Sydney.

The inaugural Billy Sanders Memorial was held on 20 February 1988 at the Sydney Showground Speedway. Bruce Penhall, who retired from racing after winning the 1982 World Final, came out of retirement for the meeting for a series of match races with legendary six time World Speedway Champion Ivan Mauger.

The winner of the Australian Solo Championship now receives the Billy Sanders Memorial Trophy.

== World Final Appearances ==
=== Individual World Championship ===
- 1977 - (Sweden) Gothenburg, Ullevi - 9th - 6pts
- 1979 - (Poland) Chorzów, Silesian Stadium - 5th - 11pts + 1pt
- 1980 - (Sweden) Gothenburg, Ullevi - 3rd - 12pts + 2pts
- 1983 - (Germany) Norden, Motodrom Halbemond - 2nd - 12pts
- 1984 - (Sweden) Gothenburg, Ullevi - 11th - 5pts

=== World Pairs Championship ===
- 1976 - (Sweden) Eskilstuna, Eskilstuna Motorstadion (with Phil Crump) - 4th - 16pts (6)
- 1977 - (England) Manchester, Hyde Road (with Phil Crump) - 7th - 12pts (2)
- 1982 - (Australia) Sydney, Liverpool City Raceway (with Gary Guglielmi) - 4th - 16pts (11)
- 1983 - (Sweden) Gothenburg, Ullevi (with Gary Guglielmi) - 2nd - 24pts (15)
- 1984 - (Italy) Lonigo, Santa Marina Stadium (with Gary Guglielmi) - 5th - 14pts (6)

=== World Team Cup ===
- 1976 - (England) London, White City (with John Boulger / Phil Crump / Phil Herne / Garry Middleton) - Winner - 31pts (7)
