= New South Wales Individual Speedway Championship =

Australian speedway competition

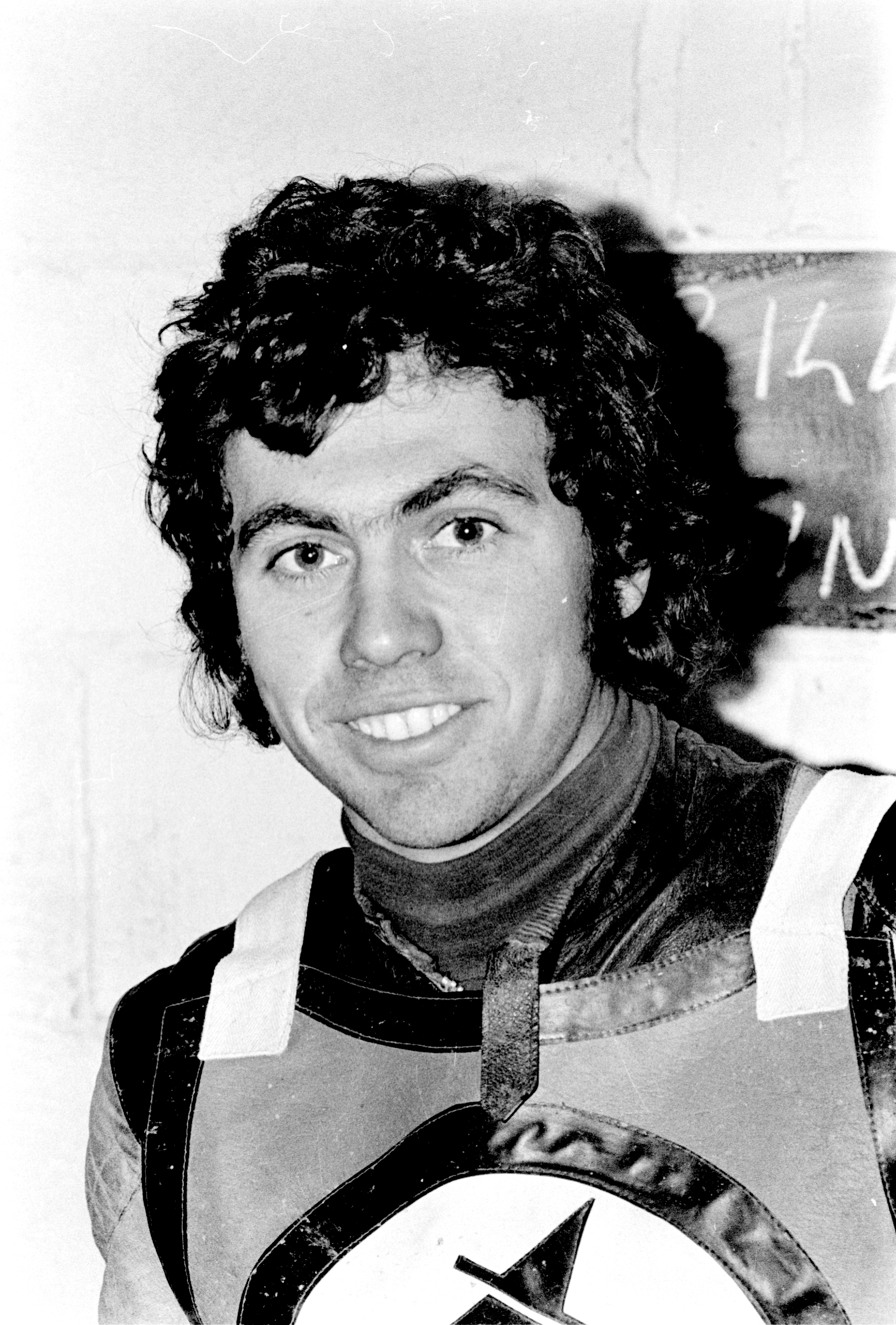
- Billy Sanders eight time champion
- Sport: Motorcycle speedway
- Most titles: Billy Sanders (8)

The New South Wales Individual Speedway Championship is a Motorcycle speedway championship held annually in New South Wales to determine the NSW State champion. The event is organised by the NSW Solo Riders' Association and is sanctioned by Motorcycling Australia (MA).

Billy Sanders from Sydney holds the record for the most number of NSW Championship wins with eight between 1976 and 1985. From his first win in 1976 until his last win in 1985, with the exception of 1983 when no title was run, Sanders was the only winner of the NSW title.

Seven international riders have won the NSW Solo Championship. Tiger Stevenson (England - 1934), Jack Milne (USA - 1937), Wilbur Lamoreaux (USA - 1938), Jack Parker (England - 1951 & 1952), Ken McKinlay (Scotland - 1960), Eric Boocock (England - 1968) and Ole Olsen (Denmark - 1972).

== Winners since 1930/31 ==
All riders from NSW unless otherwise stated.

Year	Venue	City	Winners
1930/31	Maitland Showground; Cumberland Oval	Maitland; Sydney	Mick Murphy; Bobby Blake
1931/32	Cumberland Oval	Sydney	John Allen
1932/33	Not Held		
1933/34	Cumberland Oval; Sydney Showground Speedway	Sydney	Wally Little; Tiger Stevenson ( (England) )
1934/35	Sydney Showground Speedway	Sydney	Bluey Wilkinson
1935/36	Sydney Showground Speedway	Sydney	Max Grosskreutz
1936/37	Sydney Showground Speedway	Sydney	Jack Milne ( (United States) )
1937/38	Sydney Sports Ground; Sydney Showground Speedway	Sydney	Wilbur Lamoreaux ( (United States) ) Bluey Wilkinson
1938/39	Sydney Sports Ground	Sydney	Bluey Wilkinson
1939/40	Sydney Sports Ground	Sydney	Vic Duggan
1940/41	Sydney Sports Ground	Sydney	Lionel Van Praag
1941-1945	Not Held due to World War II		
1945/46	Sydney Sports Ground	Sydney	Max Grosskreutz
1946/47	Sydney Sports Ground	Sydney	Vic Duggan
1947/48	Newcastle Showground	Newcastle	Aub Lawson
1948/49	Sydney Showground Speedway	Sydney	Bill Rogers (Vic)
1949/50	Sydney Sports Ground	Sydney	Aub Lawson
1950/51	Sydney Sports Ground	Sydney	Jack Parker ( (England) )
1951/52	Bathurst Sports Ground	Sydney	Jack Parker ( (England) )
1952/53	Sydney Showground Speedway	Sydney	Aub Lawson
1953/54	Sydney Showground Speedway	Sydney	Aub Lawson
1954/55	Not Held		
1955/56	Not Held		
1956/57			Lionel Levy
1957/58	Sydney Showground Speedway	Sydney	Noel Thorley
1958/59	Sydney Showground Speedway	Sydney	Bill Bryden
1959/60	Sydney Showground Speedway	Sydney	Ken McKinlay ( (Scotland) )
1960/61	Sydney Showground Speedway	Sydney	Brian Collins
1961/62	Sydney Showground Speedway	Sydney	Brian Collins
1962/63	Kembla Grange Speedway	Wollongong	Aub Lawson
1963/64	Kembla Grange Speedway	Wollongong	Bob Sharp
1964/65	Not Held		
1965/66	Sydney Showground Speedway	Sydney	Jim Airey
1966/67	Not Held		
1967/68	Sydney Showground Speedway	Sydney	Eric Boocock ( (England) )
1968/69	Sydney Showground Speedway	Sydney	Jim Airey
1969/70	Liverpool Speedway	Sydney	Jim Airey
1970/71	Liverpool Speedway	Sydney	Jim Airey
1971/72	Liverpool Speedway	Sydney	Ole Olsen ( (Denmark) )
1972/73	Sydney Showground Speedway	Sydney	Bob Valentine
1973/74	Sydney Showground Speedway	Sydney	Jim Airey
1974/75	Sydney Showground Speedway	Sydney	John Langfield
1975/76	Sydney Showground Speedway	Sydney	Phil Crump (Vic)
1976/77	Sydney Showground Speedway	Sydney	Billy Sanders
1977/78	Sydney Showground Speedway	Sydney	Billy Sanders
1978/79	Sydney Showground Speedway; Liverpool International Speedway	Sydney	Billy Sanders
1979/80	Sydney Showground Speedway	Sydney	Billy Sanders
1980/81	Liverpool City Raceway	Sydney	Billy Sanders
1981/82	Newcastle Motordrome	Newcastle	Billy Sanders
1982/83	Not Held		
1983/84	Liverpool City Raceway	Sydney	Billy Sanders
1984/85	Nepean Speedway	Sydney	Billy Sanders
1985/86	Newcastle Motordrome	Newcastle	Stephen Davies
1986/87	Newcastle Motordrome	Newcastle	Chris Watson
1987/88	Newcastle Motordrome	Newcastle	Stephen Davies
1988/89	Liverpool City Raceway	Sydney	Stephen Davies
1989/90	Newcastle Motordrome	Newcastle	Todd Wiltshire
1990/91	Newcastle Motordrome	Newcastle	Craig Boyce
1991/92	Nepean Speedway	Sydney	Mick Poole
1992/93	Newcastle Motordrome	Newcastle	Craig Boyce
1993/94	Gosford Speedway	Gosford	Craig Boyce
1994/95	Newcastle Motordrome	Newcastle	Craig Boyce
1995/96	Gosford Speedway	Gosford	Craig Watson
1996/97	Gosford Speedway	Gosford	Craig Boyce
1997/98	Gosford Speedway	Gosford	Mick Poole
1998/99	Gosford Speedway	Gosford	Mick Poole
1999/2000	Gosford Speedway	Gosford	Todd Wiltshire
2000/01	Gosford Speedway	Gosford	Todd Wiltshire
2001/02	Oakburn Park Speedway	Tamworth	Mick Poole
2002/03	Gosford Speedway	Gosford	Mick Poole
2003/04	Gosford Speedway	Gosford	Craig Watson
2004/05	Gosford Speedway	Gosford	Adam Shields
2005/06	Gosford Speedway	Gosford	Chris Holder
2006/07	Oakburn Park Speedway	Tamworth	Chris Holder
2007/08	Gosford Speedway	Gosford	Chris Holder
2008/09	Gosford Speedway	Gosford	Chris Holder
2009/10	Oakburn Park Speedway	Tamworth	Darcy Ward (Qld)
2010/11	Loxford Park Speedway	Kurri Kurri	Chris Holder
2011/12	Loxford Park Speedway; Oakburn Park Speedway	Kurri Kurri; Tamworth	Kozza Smith
2012/13	Loxford Park Speedway	Kurri Kurri	Sam Masters
2013/14	Loxford Park Speedway	Kurri Kurri	Brady Kurtz
2014/15	Loxford Park Speedway	Kurri Kurri	Brady Kurtz
2015/16	Oakburn Park Speedway	Tamworth	Tyson Nelson
2016/17	Loxford Park Speedway	Kurri Kurri	Rohan Tungate
2017/18	Loxford Park Speedway	Kurri Kurri	Rohan Tungate
2018/19	Woodstock Park Speedway	Cowra	Jack Holder
2019/20	Loxford Park Speedway	Kurri Kurri	Jack Holder
2020/21	Woodstock Park Speedway	Cowra	Jack Holder
2021/22	Loxford Park Speedway	Kurri Kurri	Jack Holder
2022/23	Loxford Park Speedway	Kurri Kurri	Jack Holder
2023/24 not held due to lack of entries
2024/25	Oakburn Park Speedway	Tamworth	Jack Holder
2025/26	Oakburn Park Speedway	Tamworth	tbh, 16 January 2026
