= Lionel Levy =

Australian motorcycle speedway rider

- Born: 16 October 1916; Sydney, Australia
- Died: 21 February 1968 (aged 51)
- Nationality: Australian

Career history
- 1948: Wimbledon Dons
- 1948–1950, 1952: Coventry Bees
- 1953: Southampton Saints

Individual honours
- 1952, 1953: Australian champion
- 1951: Queensland State Champion
- 1957: New South Wales State Champion

Lionel William Levy (16 October 1916 – 21 February 1968) was an Australian motorcycle speedway rider. He was twice champion of Australia in 1952 and 1953 and earned 16 international caps for the Australia national speedway team.

== Biography ==
Levy, born in Sydney, was discovered by Norman Parker and Parker brought him to England in 1948. He began his British leagues career riding for Wimbledon Dons during the 1948 Speedway National League season and Coventry Bees in the 1948 Speedway National League Division Three, where he recorded a 7.43 average.

Levy spent four seasons with Coventry (but missed the 1951 season) before riding a few times for Southampton Saints in 1953.

Levy gained valuable experience from his competition in the British leagues and became the Australian champion, after winning the Australian Solo Championship in 1952 and 1953.

Levy also won the New South Wales champion in 1957 and went on to be the Australian team manager. He died in 1968, after fracturing his skull in a race at the Sydney Showground Speedway.

== See also ==
- List of rider deaths in motorcycle speedway
