= Sydney Showground =

Sydney Showground could refer to:

- Sydney Showground (Moore Park) - the former Showground at Moore Park, New South Wales. Now Fox Studios Australia.
  - Sydney Showground Speedway - a former dirt racetrack at the Moore Park showground.
- Sydney Showground (Olympic Park) - the current Showground at Sydney Olympic Park, New South Wales.
  - Sydney Showground Stadium - a sports and events stadium forming part of the Showground at Olympic Park. Also known as Škoda Stadium and Spotless Stadium.
