= Jim Airey =

Australian speedway rider

- Born: 19 August 1941 (age 85); Earlwood, New South Wales, Australia
- Nationality: Australian

Career history
- 1964: Sunderland Saints
- 1964–1965, 1967–1968: Wolverhampton Wolves
- 1969–1971: Sheffield Tigers

Individual honours
- 1966, 1969, 1970, 1971, 1974: NSW State Champion
- 1968, 1969, 1970, 1972: Australian Champion
- 1970: Queensland State Champion
- 1971: Victorian State Champion
- 1971: Northern Riders Champion

Team honours
- 1971: World Team Cup Winner

James Sydney Airey (born 19 August 1941 in Earlwood, New South Wales) is an Australian former international motorcycle speedway rider, who rode in the 1971 World Final in Gothenburg, Sweden and was a member of the Great Britain team that won the 1971 Speedway World Team Cup. He earned 36 international caps for the Australia national speedway team and 17 caps for Great Britain.

== Career ==
=== Australia ===
Airey started racing Speedway in the early-1960s, quickly establishing himself as a star rider and won his first NSW Solo Championship at the Sydney Showground in 1966, before going on to win the Australian Championship in 1968, also held at the Showground which was his home track.

Airey became known as the "King of the Royale" as he was near unbeatable on the 509 metres (557 yd) Sydney Showground track (the Showground was known as the "Royale"). At one stage during the late 1960s Airey won a record 33 consecutive scratch races at the Showground. He wasn't totally invincible at the Showground though and regularly faced stiff competition from the likes of Bob Sharp, Gordon Guasco (who lost his life at Sydney's other speedway, Liverpool in 1970), interstate visitors such as Adelaide's John Boulger, and visiting English brothers Nigel Boocock and Eric Boocock.

Airey followed up his 1968 Australian Championship by winning both the 1969 and 1970 championships, all held at the Sydney Showground. He won his fourth and last title in 1972 at the Rowley Park Speedway in Adelaide where he defeated the reigning world champion Ole Olsen and defending Australian champion John Boulger. Injury restricted him to just fourth place during the 1973 Australian Championship at the Sydney Showground which was won by Boulger. During this time Airey also won the NSW championship in 1969, 1970 and 1971, before winning his last championship in 1974. Three of his five NSW titles were won at the Showground, while his 1970 and 1971 wins were at Liverpool in the days when the bikes still used the main 440 metres (480 yd) track. He would never place second or third in the Australian Championship, only ever stepping onto the podium as the winner.

Airey would also win the Queensland Championship in 1970, winning at both the Brisbane Exhibition Ground (Ekka) and the 3-lap title in Ipswich. He also won the Victorian title in 1971.

Airey was one of the few speedway riders who didn't have a major crash in his career. His secret was known to be that he never rode faster than he needed to, giving himself margin for error. He chose to retire after winning his last NSW Championship in 1974 aged just thirty-three. He later went on to manage the Australian team in the late 1970s.

Airey was in attendance at the Sydney Showground's final race meeting in 1996, riding a slow lap of the speedway while receiving a standing ovation from the capacity crowd. On 1 May 1999, along with 15 time World Champion Ivan Mauger, he would officially open the new Sydney Showground Speedway at the Olympic Park in Homebush.

=== England ===
Airey rode successfully in the Provincial League for the Sunderland Saints for eight meetings in 1964, before moving to the Wolverhampton Wolves for the remainder of 1964 and 1965. After not competing in England during the 1966 season, Airey returned to Wolverhampton for 1967 and 1968. He then signed with the Sheffield Tigers for 1969 and remained with the team until 1971 before retiring from the British Leagues and returning full-time to Australia.

=== International ===
Airey rode in numerous Test Matches for Australia during his career, often captaining the team in matches held in Australia against visiting national teams. Yet his greatest international success came as a member of the Great Britain team at the Olympic Stadium in Wrocław, Poland. Great Britain, containing Airey from Australia, Ivan Mauger, Barry Briggs, Ronnie Moore and captain Ray Wilson, the only English rider on the team, easily won the 1971 Speedway World Team Cup scoring 37 points to defeat the Soviet Union on 22, host nation Poland on 19 and last placed Sweden on 18.

Airey also qualified for his only World Championship Final in 1971 held at the Ullevi Stadium in Gothenburg, Sweden where he finished 8th on 8 points after a win, two 2nd places and a 3rd place. To get to the World Final he had finished 11th in the British Championship Final in Coventry (the top 12 riders went through to the British-Nordic Final in Glasgow, Scotland). He then finished in an impressive 5th in the British-Nordic Final to qualify for the European Championship Final at London's Wembley Stadium where he finished 6th to qualify for what would be his only World Final appearance.

Airey also represented Australia in the Speedway World Pairs Championship in 1969 (5th in the Western Zone Semi-final with Adelaide's Charlie Monk), 1970 (4th in Semi-final #1 with Monk), and lastly in 1971 where he finished 5th in the Second Semi-final with John Boulger.

== World Final Appearances ==
=== Individual World Championship ===
- 1971 – (Sweden) Gothenburg, Ullevi – 7th – 8pts

=== World Team Cup ===
- 1971 – (Poland) Wrocław, Olympic Stadium – Great Britain (with Ray Wilson / Ivan Mauger / Barry Briggs / Ronnie Moore) – Winner – 37pts (9)
