= Paddy Dean =

Australian motorcycle speedway rider

- Born: 18 April 1903; Wollombi, New South Wales, Australia
- Died: 13 September 1954 (aged 51); Forbes, New South Wales, Australia
- Nationality: Australian

Career history
- 1931: West Ham Hammers
- 1931: Plymouth

Individual honours
- 1927: Australian champion (3 lap)

John Patrick Dean (18 April 1903 – 13 September 1954) was a motorcycle speedway rider from Australia.

== Biography ==
Dean, born in Wollombi, New South Wales, lost two fingers in an accident involving a horse and cart, which enabled him to buy a motorcycle with the insurance money. He duly set four world records in Australia during 1926 and became the 1927 Australian champion over 3 laps.

Dean was one of the most significant early pioneers of speedway, particularly in the United Kingdom, when he travelled over from Australia for the inaugural season of the sport in 1928. He took part in some of the first meetings ever staged in Britain. He was a major name throughout parts of Britain in 1928 being described as the World's champion Dirt Track rider.

Dean returned to the United Kingdom in 1931, signing for West Ham Hammers and beginning his British leagues career riding for them during the 1931 Speedway Southern League season. However he only rode three times for them after struggling with just one point from five rides. He moved to ride for Plymouth for the remainder of the season in challenge matches.

Dean returned to his native Australia, where he continued to race.
