= Wally Little (speedway rider) =

Australian motorcycle speedway rider

- Born: 20 November 1909; Woollahra, Sydney
- Died: 27 July 1974 (aged 64); Australia
- Nationality: Australian

Career history
- 1934, 1937: Wembley Lions
- 1934, 1937–1938: Wimbledon Dons

Individual honours
- 1932: Australian Solo Championship
- 1934: New South Wales State Champion

Wallace Norman Little (20 November 1909 – 27 July 1974) was a motorcycle speedway rider from Australia. He was champion of Australia in 1932 and earned 13 international caps for the Australia national speedway team.

== Biography ==
Little, born in Woollahra, Sydney, won the 1932, 2 lap Australian Solo Championship at the Cumberland Oval. His form in Australia was noticed by the British clubs and Wembley Lions secured his services. However, he worked for the Sydney City Council in the telephone service and a special meeting with the Council and Lord Mayor was required to approve his move to England.

Little began riding for Wembley during the 1934 Speedway National League season but he struggled to make it into the first team despite captaining the reserves. His form improved which made him ineligible for the reserves, so he was loaned out to Wimbledon Dons.

After a difficult first season in the United Kingdom, Little returned to Australia but suffered a serious injury in a crash during February 1935, whilst riding for Australia against England in a test match. He broke his thigh and collarbone and missed the 1935 season for his parent club Wembley.

After a full years recovery, Little was ready to ride again in 1936 and performed well in Australia. He returned to British speedway in 1937 signing again for Wembley but once again found himself loaned out to Wimbledon. He enjoyed a much better 1938, averaging 7.56 for Wimbledon.

Hackney Wick Wolves made an attempt to sign Little in 1939 but he remained in Australia, where he finished his career and was still riding in 1949.
