= Frank Duckett =

Australian motorcycle speedway rider

- Born: 5 January 1903; Wallaroo, South Australia, Australia
- Died: 20 October 1972 (aged 69); Adelaide, Australia
- Nationality: Australian

Career history
- 1931: Stamford Bridge Pensioners

Individual honours
- 1929: Australian champion (3 lap)

Frank Ernest Duckett (5 January 1903 – 20 October 1972) was a motorcycle speedway rider from Australia. He earned an international cap for the Australia national speedway team.

== Biography ==
Duckett, born in Wallaroo, South Australia, was one of the early pioneers of speedway, particularly in the United Kingdom, when he travelled over from Australia for the inaugural season of the sport in 1928. He took part in some of the first meetings ever staged in Britain. Duckett was credited with holding the Australian mile record in 1928.

After returning home for the Australia season, Duckett became the 1929 Australian champion over three laps. He was one of the star names during the 1929 UK season, with large attendances gathering to witness the new sport.

Duckett's 1929 season was interrupted by a broken ankle in late June but within a month he was back racing. He chose to restrict his racing to special events for prize money and was not lured by the early league teams of 1929 and 1930. He rode for an Australian select team in 1930. He finally made his league debut riding for Stamford Bridge Pensioners during the 1931 Speedway Southern League season but averaged just 3.60.

Duckett returned to Australia to race and would not ride in Britain again. By trade, Duckett worked for Lenroc Motorcycles as a spare parts salesman before joining Litchfield Engineering.
