= Keith Ryan (speedway rider) =

Australian motorcycle speedway rider

- Born: 30 December 1922; Mittagong, NSW, Australia
- Died: 21 May 2018 (aged 95)
- Nationality: Australian

Career history
- 1947–1949: Glasgow Tigers

Individual honours
- 1952: 2 lap Australian champion
- 1952: 3 lap Australian champion

Keith Vincent Ryan also known as Buck Ryan (30 December 1922 – 21 May 2018) was an Australian motorcycle speedway rider. He was twice champion of Australia in 1952 (over two and three laps) and earned six international caps for the Australia national speedway team.

== Biography ==
Ryan, born in Mittagong, was recruited by Charlie Spinks during the 1974 Australian season, for the British league tracks under the control of Johnnie Hoskins. He began his British league career riding for Glasgow Tigers during the 1947 Speedway National League Division Two season.

The following season in 1948, Ryan improved his average to a respectable 7.20. His final season in Scotland was in 1947. After returning to Australia he continued to earn international caps and captained the Australian national team.

Ryan was due to return to Britain for the 1951 season but eventually did not, although he gained valuable experience from his competition in the British leagues and became the Australian champion, after winning the two lap and three lap versions of the Australian Solo Championship in 1952.
