= Alby Taylor =

Australian motorcycle speedway rider

- Born: 11 February 1905; Edwardstown, South Australia, Australia
- Died: 5 September 1956 (aged 51); Pasadena, South Australia, Australia
- Nationality: Australian

Career history
- 1931: Leicester Stadium
- 1931: Coventry Bees

Individual honours
- 1928: Australian champion (6 lap)

Alban George Taylor (11 February 1905 – 5 September 1956) was a motorcycle speedway rider from Australia. He rode as Alby Taylor and earned two international caps for the Australia national speedway team.

== Biography ==
Taylor, born in Adelaide, came to significant prominence in the early days of speedway after becoming the 1928 Australian champion over 6 laps. The achievement resulted in the British teams looking to bring him overseas and help continue the trend of large attendances that were present during the first two years of speedway in the United Kingdom.

During 1930, Taylor rode in many UK special events and twice represented an Australian select team against England before signing up for league speedway the following season. He began his British leagues career riding for Leicester Stadium, making his debut in a challenge match for them in April before taking part in matches as part of the 1931 Speedway Southern League season.

During late May 1931, Leicester Stadium withdrew from the league and were replaced by Coventry Bees, where Taylor would see out the remainder of the season. Taylor recorded a 5.35 average with Leicester but improved to 6.67 with Coventry.

Taylor returned to Australia at the end of the 1931 season and would not ride in Britain again.
