= Phil Herne =

Australian speedway rider

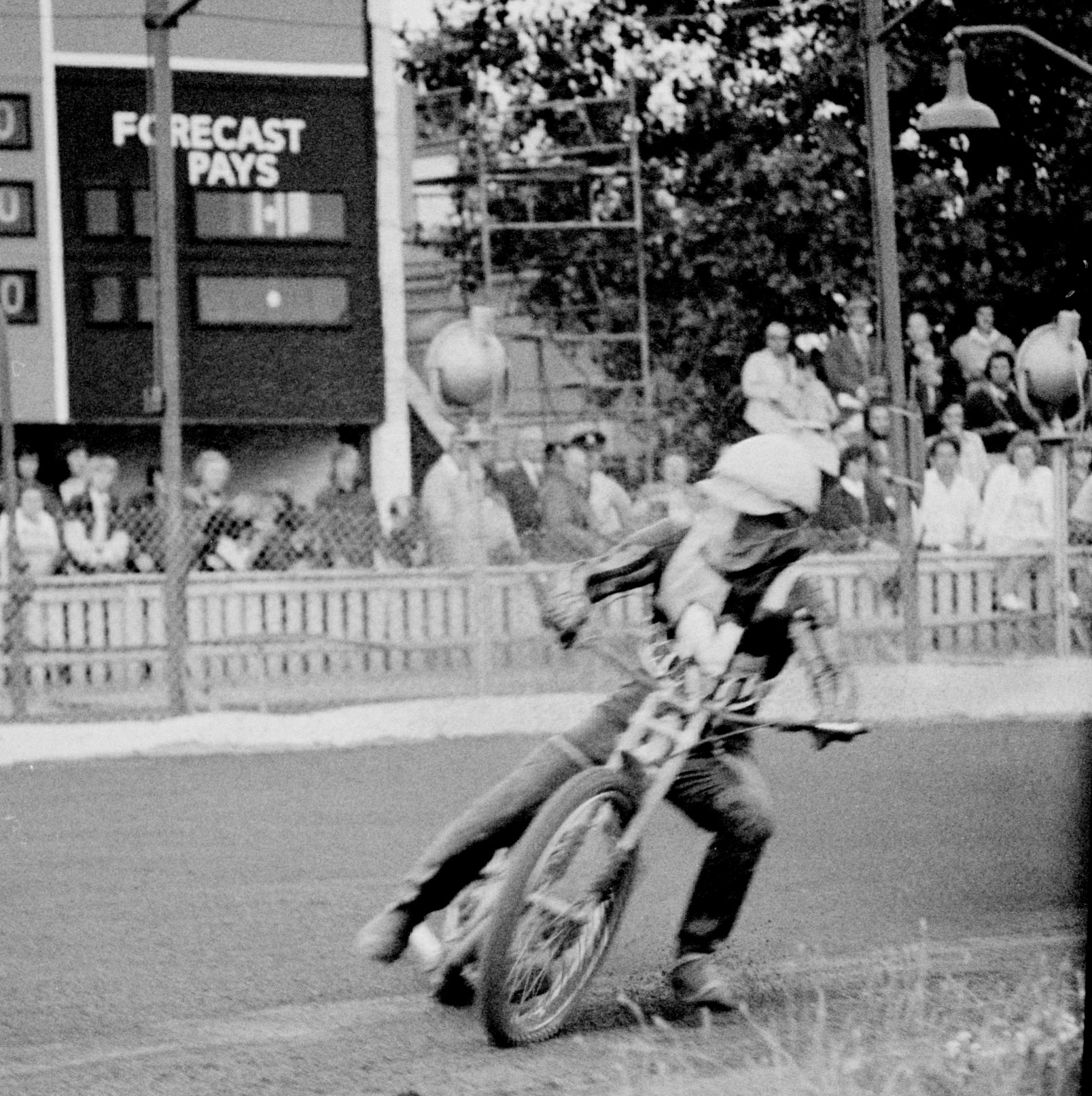
- Herne in action
- Born: 27 March 1955 (age 71); Ballina, New South Wales
- Nationality: Australian

Career history
- 1973–1974, 1978–1980: Birmingham Brummies
- 1973–1974: Wolverhampton Wolves
- 1974, 1983: Swindon Robins
- 1974: Poole Pirates
- 1974: Ipswich Witches
- 1975–1976: Newport
- 1977: Bristol Bulldogs
- 1981–1983: Leicester Lions

Individual honours
- 1974: Championship of Sussex

Team honours
- 1974: British League Division Two Champion
- 1974: British League Division Two KO Cup Winner
- 1975: Spring Gold Cup
- 1976: World Team Cup

Philip Edwin Herne (born 27 March 1955) is an Australian former motorcycle speedway rider who won the World Team Cup in 1976.

== Biography ==
Born in Ballina, New South Wales, Herne began his speedway career at the Kembla Grange Speedway in Wollongong, south of Sydney, before establishing himself in the British League Division Two with Birmingham Brummies in 1973. The 1974 season was his most successful for the Brummies, with fourteen full maximum scores, and an average of over ten points. In 1975 after finishing third in the Australian Championship at the Sydney Showground Speedway, he moved up to the British League with Newport, moving to Bristol Bulldogs in 1977, before returning to Birmingham for 1978, 1979 and 1980 seasons. He joined Leicester Lions in 1981, spending three seasons with the Lions before moving on to Swindon Robins during the 1983 season, which was his final season before retiring.

Herne made over thirty appearances for Australia and was part of the Australian team that won the World Team Cup in 1976.

Herne was the track reserve for the 1982 Speedway World Pairs Championship final staged at his home track, the Liverpool Speedway in Sydney. He failed to finish his only ride of the night, partnering New Zealand's Mitch Shirra as a substitute for Larry Ross.

== Personal life ==
Herne is married to Ipswich-born wife Debra and has a daughter, Ella, and sons Lee and Jay, both also professional speedway riders. After speedway, Herne worked as a truck driver for ten years before working as a postman.

== World Final appearances ==
=== World Pairs Championship ===
- 1982 - (Australia) Sydney, Liverpool City Raceway - Reserve - 0pts (1 ride for New Zealand)

=== World Team Cup ===
- 1976 - (England) London, White City Stadium (with John Boulger / Phil Crump / Billy Sanders / Garry Middleton) - Winner - 31pt (7)
