= Phil Crump =

Australian speedway rider

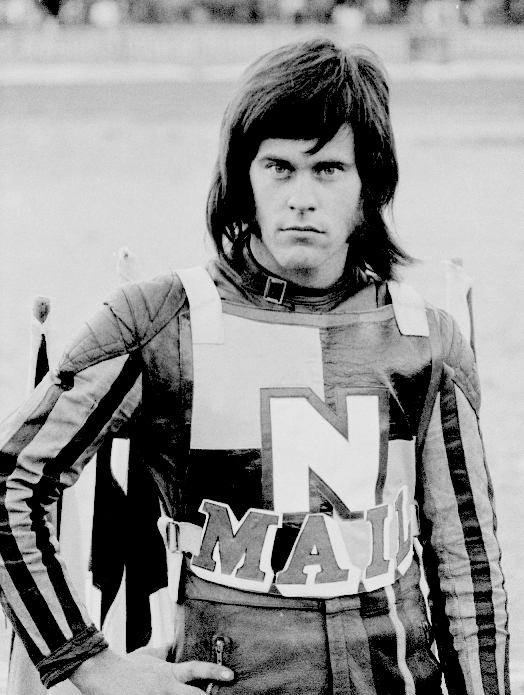
- Born: 9 February 1952 (age 74); Mildura, Victoria
- Nationality: Australian

Career history
- 1971, 1972: Crewe Kings
- 1971, 1974-1976: Newport Wasps
- 1971: Wolverhampton Wolves
- 1971-1973: King's Lynn Stars
- 1977-1978: Bristol Bulldogs
- 1979-1986, 1990: Swindon Robins

Individual honours
- 1975, 1979, 1984, 1988: Australian Champion
- 1992: Australian Long track Champion
- 1972, 1973, 1974, 1975, 1977, 1979, 1980, 1981, 1982, 1984, 1985, 1986, 1988: Victorian State Champion
- 1976: NSW State Champion
- 1972: British League Division Two Riders Champion
- 1979: Olympique
- 1974, 1978, 1984: Westernapolis winner
- 1974: Yorkshire Television Trophy winner
- 1975: Welsh Open winner
- 1975, 1976: Brandonapolis
- 1975: Spring Classic
- 1981: Superama
- 1981: Golden Gauntlets
- 1981, 1982, 1984: Daily Mirror/Weslake 16-Lapper

Team honours
- 1976: World Team Cup Winner
- 1972: British League Division Two Winner
- 1972: British League Division Two KO Cup Winner
- 1973, 1974, 1975: Spring Gold Cup Winner

Philip John Crump (born 9 February 1952 in Mildura, Victoria) is an Australian former motorcycle speedway rider. who attained third place in the 1976 World Championship. He also won the 1976 Speedway World Team Cup with Australia in the same year.

== Career ==
=== Australia ===
Crump who gained the nicknames Crumpy and the Mildura Marvel, started racing speedway in his late teens at his local Mildura track Olympic Park Speedway. He won his first Australian Solo Championship in 1975 at the Sydney Showground Speedway and would go on to win another three national championships in 1979 and 1984 at Olympic Park and in 1988, at the Riverview Speedway in Murray Bridge. He would also finish second on five occasions (1976, 1977, 1980, 1981 and 1985) while he would finish third in the championship in 1983.

The 1983 championship at Adelaide's Speedway Park and had easily won his first three races, including setting a new three lap track record along the way. In his fourth race he came against three-time defending champion Billy Sanders who was also undefeated but had looked less convincing after only narrowly defeating Gary Guglielmi in his first race (Guglielmi had led for the first 2¾ laps before Sanders passed him in the final turn). The most anticipated race of the night ended early as the pair clashed in turn 2 of the first lap with Sanders going down. In a very unpopular decision with the almost 8,000 strong crowd, meeting referee Sam Bass excluded Crump and Sanders went on to win the re-run race (beating Crump's new track record by 5/100 of a second) and subsequently the championship after also winning his final ride. As a result of finishing third in the championship, Crump missed a place in the Overseas Final.

Crump finished second to reigning World Champion Ole Olsen of Denmark in the 1976 Australian title after the Dane was a controversial inclusion in the Final at the Liverpool International Speedway in Sydney, despite protests from other riders about his non-Australian eligibility. However, knowing Olsen's drawing power, Liverpool management Mike Raymond and Frank Oliveri successfully pushed for his inclusion in the meeting.

Crump had a stranglehold on the Victorian State Championship winning 13 titles between 1972 and 1988, winning every year except 1976, 1978, 1983 and 1987. He also took out the NSW State Championship in 1976 at the Sydney Showwground.

=== England ===
The Crump family had a home in Bristol while Phil was racing in the British League, which he started doing in 1971 with the Crewe Kings. He also rode for the Newport Wasps, King's Lynn Stars, Bristol Bulldogs and Swindon Robins during his British career.

In 1972, Crump won the British League Division Two Riders Championship, held at Wimbledon Stadium on 14 October and was the highest points average scorer for the 1972 British League Division Two season. In addition, he was instrumental in helping Crewe win the league and cup double.

In 1974, Crump won the "Westernapolis" meeting at Exeter and later won the meeting for a second time in 1978 and again in 1984. He also won the inaugural Yorkshire Television Trophy meeting at The Boulevard in Hull in 1974.

Crump left Bristol Bulldogs, when signed by Swindon Robin's promoter Wally Mawdsley, for the 1979 season and after a transfer battle between Reading Racers and Swindon.

After retiring from British League riding in 1986, Crump, who had continued riding in Australia including winning the national championship in 1988, made a comeback for a single season with Swindon in 1990 joining his young protégé from Mildura Leigh Adams.

=== International career ===
Early in Crump's international career, New Zealand's four time World Champion Barry Briggs predicted that he would be a future World Champion.

Crump rode in three World Finals during his career. His first appearance in a World Final was at the famous Wembley Stadium in 1975 where he scored ten points to finish in sixth place. He achieved his best placing at the Silesian Stadium in Katowice, Poland in 1976 when he finished in third place on 12 points behind English pair Peter Collins and Malcolm Simmons. Crump's final World Final appearance was in 1982 when he finished in a disappointing 14th place at the Los Angeles Memorial Coliseum. He scored four points in his five rides on the night, all third-place finishes in his first four races. Crump rode in the controversial Heat 14 which saw the clash between defending champion Bruce Penhall of the United States, and Englishman Kenny Carter.

Crump won his only World Championship when he was a member of the Australian team that won the 1976 Speedway World Team Cup at the White City Stadium in London alongside team captain John Boulger, Billy Sanders, Phil Herne, and reserve Garry Middleton. Australia scored 31 points in the final, with Crump the top scorer with 11. His only loss was to Sweden's 1974 World Champion Anders Michanek in Heat 9.

Teaming with South Australian champion Boulger, Crump would finish in second place in the 1974 Speedway World Pairs Championship held at the Hyde Road Speedway in Manchester. In 1975, they teamed again to finish in fifth place in Wrocław, Poland. Crump would team with Billy Sanders to finish in fourth place in 1976 in Eskilstuna, Sweden, and seventh in 1977 in Manchester. He teamed with Queensland's John Titman to again finish fourth in Vojens, Denmark in 1979, and another Qld rider in Steve Regeling to finish sixth in 1985 in Rybnik, Poland, and ninth in 1986 in the West German city of Pocking. The 1986 World Pairs Championship was Phil Crump's last appearance in a World Final as a rider.

== World Final Appearances ==
=== Individual World Championship ===
- 1975 - (England) London, Wembley Stadium - 6th - 10pts
- 1976 - (Poland) Chorzów, Silesian Stadium - 3rd - 12pts
- 1982 - (United States) Los Angeles, Memorial Coliseum - 14th - 4pts

=== World Pairs Championship ===
- 1974 - (England) Manchester, Hyde Road (with John Boulger) - 2nd - 23pts (14)
- 1975 - (Poland) Wrocław, Olympic Stadium (with John Boulger) - 5th - 19pts (10)
- 1976 - (Sweden) Eskilstuna, Eskilstuna Motorstadion (with Billy Sanders) - 4th - 16pts (10)
- 1977 - (England) Manchester, Hyde Road (with Billy Sanders) - 7th - 12pts (10)
- 1979 - (Denmark) Vojens, Speedway Center (with John Titman) - 4th - 19pts (13)
- 1985 - (Poland) Rybnik, Rybnik Municipal Stadium (with Steve Regeling) - 6th - 11pts (5)
- 1986 - (Germany) Pocking, Rottalstadion (with Steve Regeling) - 9th - 15pts (10)

=== World Team Cup ===
- 1976 - (England) London, White City Stadium (with John Boulger / Billy Sanders / Phil Herne / Garry Middleton) - Winner - 31pts (11)

== Personal life ==
Crump and his ex-wife Carole are the parents of three time (2004, 2006 and 2009) world speedway champion Jason Crump. Crump senior was riding for the Newport Wasps speedway team when Jason was born in Bristol. Phil and Jason Crump also have the distinction of being the only father/son combination to win the Australian Individual title.

Until Jason's final Speedway Grand Prix season in 2012, Phil Crump was the senior member of his son's support team, as was his father in law (and long time Team Manager of the Australian Speedway Team), Neil Street.

Crump was inducted into the Australian Speedway Hall of Fame in 2019.
