= Maitland Showground =

Showground in Maitland, Australia

- Interactive map of Maitland Showground
- Location: Maitland Showground, Blomfield St, South Maitland NSW 2320, Australia
- Coordinates: 32°44′41″S 151°33′46″E

Construction
- Opened: 1873

Maitland Showground is an multi-purpose outdoor recreational area located on Blomfield Street, Evans Street and Louth Park Road, in Maitland, New South Wales, Australia. The site is used for the annual Maitland Show (a show for agriculture, livestock and other exhibits). It also includes the greyhound racing stadium known as Maitland Greyhounds and the Maitland Harness Racing Club, around the exterior of the greyhound track. The site is also a historic landmark for motorcycle speedway having been regarded as the birth of the sport on 15 December 1923.

Groovin' The Moo music festival occurred annually at Maitland Showground from 2006 to 2023, with a two year break due to the COVID-19 pandemic. Artists such as Silverchair, The Black Keys, Billie Eilish, and Fatboy Slim performed at the festival to crowds of over 17,000.

== History ==
The site owned by the Albion Cricket Club at the time was purchased by the Hunter River Agricultural and Horticultural Association in 1873, although it continued as their venue for their cricket ground. Further purchases increased the size of the area to 80 acres. The grandstand was renovated in both 1905 and 1920.

On 15 December 1923, motorcycle speedway was introduced to the Showground. It is regarded that this was the birth of this popular form of motorcycle racing. New Zealander Johnnie Hoskins took a job as secretary of the West Maitland Agriculture Society and made the decision to introduce speedway. A man called Jim Cameron built the track and the sport boomed and was then introduced to the United Kingdom. The Maitland speedway hosted the Australian Solo Championship in 1952 but the speedway ended at Maitland on 29 March 1952.

In 1927, the greyhound stadium was built within the showgrounds. As of 2024, racing takes place primarily on Mondays and the track is 632 metres in circumference, although race distance are 400, 450 and 565 metres.

In 1936, the harness racing began. As of 2024, it primarily takes place on Sundays and is a 775.60 metres circumference circuit.

From 2006 to 2023 Groovin' the Moo touring music festival annually stopped at Maitland Showground. The festival saw a mix of local and international acts, and had a capacity of 17,500. Touring complexities from the COVID-19 pandemic resulted in the 2020 and 2021 editions of the festival being cancelled, however in 2021 a smaller festival titled Fresh Produce occurred in its place which consisted exclusively of Australian artists. Groovin' the Moo was announced for Maitland Showgrounds in 2024, but cancelled 2 weeks later due to low ticket sales. Maitland was not included as a location when a scaled down festival was announced in 2026.
