= Bob Sharp (speedway rider) =

Australian motorcycle speedway rider

- Born: 17 February 1934; Arcadia, New South Wales, Australia
- Died: 12 September 2012 (aged 78)
- Nationality: Australian

Career history
- 1952–1954: Glasgow White City
- 1954–1958: Ipswich Witches

Individual honours
- 1962, 1965: Australian champion
- 1964: New South Wales champion

Team honours
- 1952, 1953: Scottish Cup winner

Robert Henry Sharp (17 February 1934 – 12 September 2012) was an Australian motorcycle speedway rider. He was twice champion of Australia in 1962 and 1965 and earned 13 international caps for the Australia national speedway team.

== Biography ==
Sharp, born in Arcadia, New South Wales, began his British leagues career riding for Glasgow Tigers during the 1952 Speedway National League Division Two season. He won the Scottish novices Championship in September 1952.

Sharp spent two full seasons with Glasgow but in 1954 was forced to find a new club following Glasgow's withdrawal from the league campaign.

Sharp switched to Ipswich Witches and began to build on his previous seasons averages, recording 6.38 for the 1954 season. He came to prominence in 1956 after recording an 8.93 average for Ipswich. However, following a disappointing 1958 campaign he returned to ride in Australia.

Sharp became the Australian champion after winning the Australian Solo Championship in 1962 and New South Wales champion in 1964. He won a second Australian title in 1965.
