= Sydney Showground Speedway =

Former dirt racetrack at Moore Park, Sydney

Sydney Showground
Speedway Royale Speedway Royal The Royale
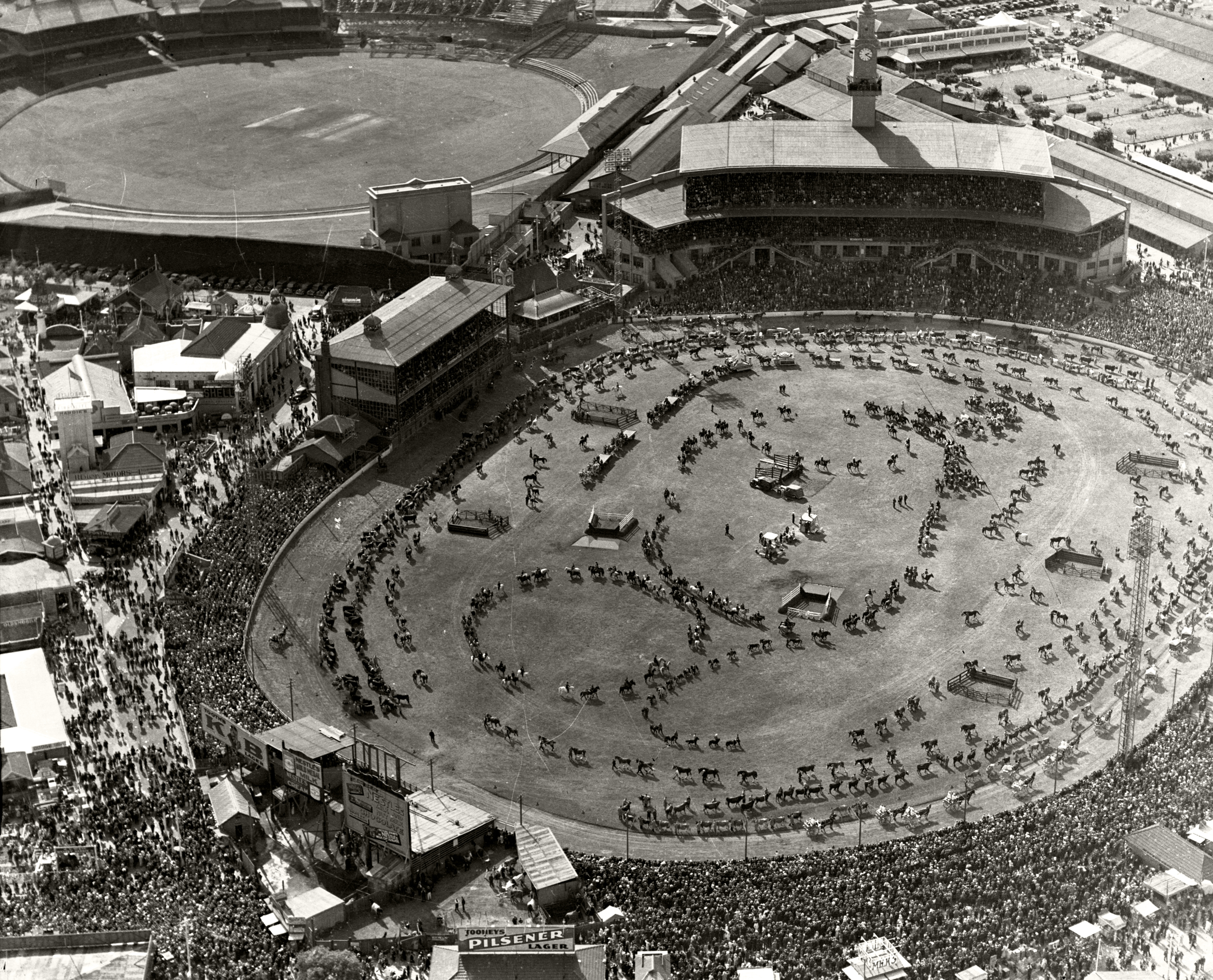
- Sydney Showground during the 1936 Sydney Royal Easter Show. The speedways start/finish line was located at the right of the picture.
- Location: Moore Park, New South Wales
- Coordinates: 33°53′36″S 151°13′37″E
- Capacity: 40,000
- Owner: New South Wales Government
- Operator: Royal Agricultural Society of NSW (showground); Empire Speedways (speedway)
- Broke ground: 1882
- Opened: 1882 (showground); 1926 (speedway)
- Closed: 1996
- Major events: Australian Sprintcar Championship; Australian Speedcar Championship; Australian Speedcar Grand Prix; Australian Solo Championship; Australian Sidecar Championship; Australasian Solo Final

Oval
- Surface: dolomite
- Length: 0.316 mi (0.509 km)
- Race lap record: 0:16.876 (Jay Drake ( (United States) ), 1996, Speedcar)

Sydney Showground Speedway, originally known as the Speedway Royal and later the Speedway Royale but often referred to as just The Royale or The Showground, was a motorcycle speedway track, which was located at the old Sydney Showground and used from 1926 until 1996.

== History ==
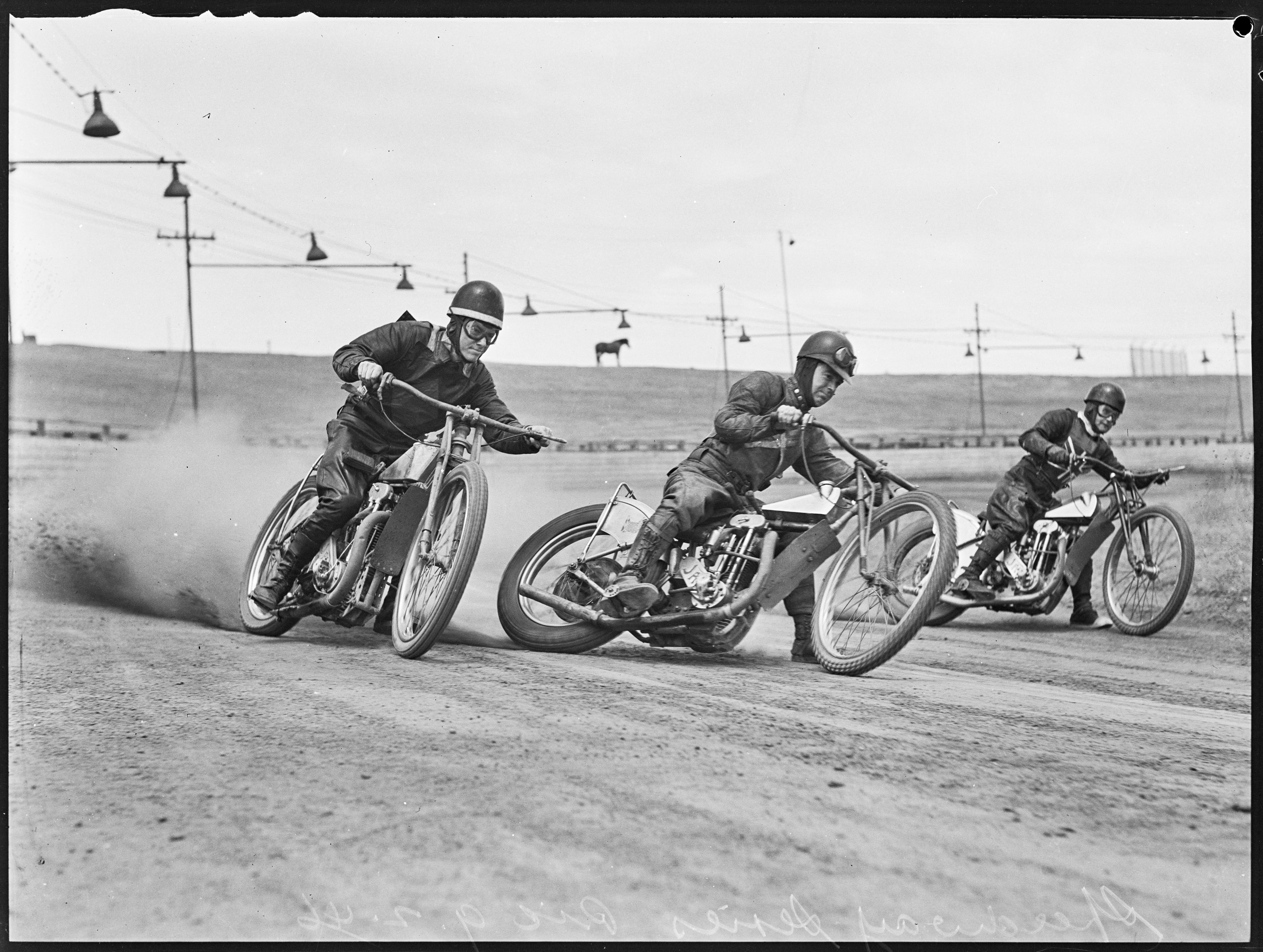
Jack Arnfield, Frank Dolan, Cliff Parkinson (l-r), Sydney Speedway, Sydney, 1946

In 1937, The Showground was claimed to be the fastest speedway in the world by the tracks promoters. The 509 metres (557 yards) egg shaped track was also the site of some spectacular crashes, some unfortunate deaths and a lot of spectacular racing. Although solos were first to race at the showground on 21 July 1926, they were soon joined by sidecars and Speedcars (also known as Midgets but called Speedcars in Australia). In the 1950s stock cars began to appear joined much later by demolition derbies and jumping motorcycles over buses and the Royale would attract huge spectator attendance.

The track had a dolomite surface, which the speedway drivers and riders continually asked the owners, the Royal Agricultural Society of NSW, to mix in shale and clay (as used on tracks in England such as Wembley) to improve traction but this never happened. A long stated reason for this was that the Showground was also used year-round as a harness racing venue (though this excuse wore thin after the 'trotts' moved permanently to the Harold Park Paceway in the late 1940s). The only other major complaint about the track itself was that it was very narrow compared to other speedways. Where most tracks allowed three wide racing even in the corners, at the Showground there was barely enough room for two cars.

The speedway's pits were located under the Martin & Angus Stand at the southern end of the track. This created a unique atmosphere with the place often filling with cigarette smoke and the smell of oil and petrol. Former dual Rugby international and part-time announcer at the speedway Rex Mossop once described the pits at the Royale as being like "Dantino's Inferno".

The start / finish line at the Showground was on the eastern side of the track in front of the Suttor Stand. Running anti-clockwise as most speedway divisions do, the track then moved into the Bull Pens for turn 1, so called as this was where the cattle would enter the arena during the Royal Easter Show. The track announcers box was located close to the track above the Bull Pens. They then continued past the double decked Members Stand and the famous clock tower sitting on the roof, and into what riders called "The Armpit", a tight turn leading onto the back straight where the Coronation Stand stood. Turns 3 and 4 went past Martin & Angus Stand and the pits before passing the Sinclair Stand in turn 4 and coming onto the main straight to finish the lap.

Although the Showground was later universally known as a Speedcar track, from the late 1920s until the 1950s the speedway was more well known for its motorcycle racing, hosting many Australian Solo Championship and Australian Sidecar Championship meetings as well as Solo test Matches between Australia and various visiting nations. The first test at the Showground was held on 15 December 1934 between Australia and Great Britain with Australia winning 35–19 in front of 50,000 paying fans. In March 1933, The Royale hosted the unofficial Speedway World Championship, won by England's Harry Whitfield from Australian's Billy Lamont and future World Champion Bluey Wilkinson.

During the 1960s and 1970s the Showground was Australia's best known and best attended speedway regularly drawing crowds on a Saturday night in excess of 10,000 and often over 30,000 making speedway one of the best attended spectator sports during the Australian summer. The speedway's promoter, John Sherwood (Empire Speedways who also promoted the Brisbane Exhibition Ground), was always looking for ways other than the racing itself to keep the crowds coming in. One of the more popular was the addition of Kings Cross strippers as trophy girls.

From 1947 until 1974 the Speedway hosted the annual Australian Speedcar Grand Prix, following which the race moved to the Liverpool Speedway in western Sydney before returning to the Showground in 1990. NSW drivers Ray Revell and Andy McGavin won a record 5 Speedcar Grand Prix's at the Showground while Bob "Two Gun" Tattersall of the United States won the race four times in 1960, 1962, 1966 and 1969.

One of the more unusual things at the speedway happened on 28 December 1975 when the so-called "Speedway Streaker" made his only appearance. Unlike the usual streakers at sporting events who jump the fence and run around on the field until caught by either Police or Security, this streaker rode out of the pits on a Solo motorbike completely naked other than a full faced helmet (to protect the guilty) and riding shoes. He did a quick lap of the track before laying the bike down on the infield. He was last seen jumping over the fence being chased by laughing policemen. Years later the streaker was revealed to be local solo rider Reg McCarthy.

The Speedway ran continuous Saturday night meetings until the close of the 1980/81 season with Sydney fans spoiled for choice with the Parramatta City Raceway running on Friday nights and the Showground as well as Liverpool Speedway both running on Saturday nights. Like other suburban based speedways around Australia such as Rowley Park in Adelaide, the local residents around the showground began to complain about the noise and also regarding the cars parking on the streets as the showground had very little in the way of designated car parks. With some residents having powerful friends on the City of Sydney council who made increasing restrictions on noise and parking and demanded that meetings be finished no later than 10:30pm (meetings traditionally finished around 11:30pm). This, combined with the advent of World Series Cricket in 1977 attracting a lot of the spectators, forced the speedway to close for regular meetings after 1981. What was hard to take for the promoter of the Showground, Brisbane based speedcar driver Ron Wanless, was that noise tests were conducted which proved that speedway meetings were actually quieter than sporting events at the neighbouring Sydney Cricket Ground, the Royal Easter Show and open air music concerts held at either venue. Traffic was also reportedly less of a problem on speedway nights than for the Easter Show or when sports such as rugby league or cricket used the SCG.

The showground enjoyed a brief revival in 1988 as a Bicentennial Solo Test Match was held between Australia and Great Britain attracting around 15,000 spectators. Unfortunately for the local fans, Great Britain defeated Australia on the night. The last ever Solo Test Match to take place at the Showground was held on 1 January 1994 with Australia taking on England. Like the first ever Test at the Showground in 1934, Australia dominated and won 68 points to 40 in front of a crowd of just over 17,000.

After 13 races held at the Liverpool Speedway, the Australian Speedcar Grand Prix returned to its traditional home as the Speedways only annual car racing event from 1990 until 1993 when the event was moved from the Speedway due to the same complaints that closed the Showground as a speedway in 1980, but returned for one last time in 1996 as the Showground was to be closed and turned into Fox Studios Australia. The 46th Australian Speedcar Grand Prix was held on 20 April. The race was won by the only competitor who had previously raced at the speedway, Australian speedway legend and 10 times Australian Sprintcar Champion Garry Rush from western Sydney. It was his second win in the Grand Prix as he had won the 1977 event held on the asphalt at the Liverpool Speedway.

On Saturday 27 April 1996, approximately 25,000 fans saw Garry Rush win the last ever race held at the world-famous Sydney Showground Speedway when he took out the World Derby for Speedcars in a fitting end to the Showgrounds life as a speedway. Rush's wins in the last two main events at the Showground were for the same team with whom he had raced for at the venue some 30 years previously.

Visiting American driver Jay Drake set the Showground lap record at the 20 April Grand Prix meeting when he ran the 509 metre oval in 16.876 seconds. When asked what he thought of the famous track, Drake described it as "Awfully narrow".

== Present day ==
The old Sydney Showgrounds and the Showground Speedway is now owned by and is part of Fox Studios Australia and although it now has a paved surface the track, and its narrow width, is still clearly visible.

== Lap records ==
- Speedcars: 16.876 - (United States) Jay Drake, 1996
- Sprintcars: 16.90 - (United States) Jimmy Sills, 1976
- Solo: 18.80 - (Australia) Bill Landels (flying start)
- Solo: 19.80 - (Australia) Jim Airey (clutch start)
- Sidecars: 20.20 - (Australia) Doug Tyerman (clutch start)
- Sedans: 20.80 - (Australia) Ray Solway

== Fatalities ==
The Sydney Showground Speedway, like other speedways of the era, saw its share of competitor fatalities. In total there were 29 deaths at the speedway between 1926 and 1973. In December 2000, a plaque was unveiled at the Fox studios site of the former Speedway by longtime track announcer Jim Shepherd. The plaque overlooks the former start line alongside the Suttor Stand (built in 1909) which is now a cafe restaurant.

The 29 who lost their lives at the Speedway Royale are

- Stanley Tyler - Solo (13 November 1926)
- James Donaghy - Solo (26 February 1927)
- Keith Mackay - Solo (22 December 1928)
- Stuart Cobcroft - Solo (6 October 1930)
- Frank Harris - Solo (6 December 1930)
- Bert Brennan - Solo (3 December 1932)
- Frank Elms - Solo (21 December 1935)
- Leonard Behrmann -Solo (5 June 1945)
- Jack Skelton - Sidecar (4 January 1947)
- Norm Hardy - Sidecar (12 April 1947)
- Kev Gallagher - Speedcar (7 December 1949)
- Jim Hansbury - Solo (7 March 1953)
- Brian Moles - Speedcar (3 November 1956)
- Bob Staples - Solo (15 December 1956)
- Merv Dowling - Sidecar [passenger] (3 March 1957)
- Sam Stanton - Speedcar (24 January 1959)
- Peter Johnson - Speedcar (7 January 1961)
- Jack Blssacker - Speedcar (21 October 1961)
- Barry Robinson - Speedcar (30 November 1963)
- Nick Collier - Speedcar (27 February 1965)
- Barry Hopkins - Solo (13 November 1965)
- Ted Preston - Sidecar (5 February 1966)
- Dennis Duggan - Sidecar [passenger] (29 October 1966)
- Lionel Levy - Solo (10 February 1968)
- Ken Mapp - Solo (29 September 1968)
- Roger Browne - Solo (15 February 1969)
- John Dunne - Sidecar (24 October 1970)
- Geoff Curtis - Solo (15 December 1973)

== Famous competitors ==
Some of the more famous competitors who raced at the Sydney Showground Speedway include:

- Leigh Adams ( (Australia) ) (Solo)
- Jim Airey ( (Australia) ) (Solo)
- Grenville Anderson ( (Australia) ) (Sedans) †
- Merle Bettenhausen ( (United States) ) (Speedcar)
- Dick Briton (Super Modified/Sprintcar/Stockcar)
- Bill Bingham (Sidecar)
- Kym Bonython ( (Australia) ) (Speedcar) †
- Eric Boocock ( (England) ) (Solo)
- Nigel Boocock ( (England) ) (Solo) †
- John Boulger ( (Australia) ) (Solo)
- Jack Brabham ( (Australia) ) (Speedcar) †
- Frank "Satan" Brewer ( (New Zealand) / (United States) ) (Speedcar) †
- Barry Briggs ( (New Zealand) ) (Solo)
- Mike Broadbank ( (England) ) (Solo)
- "Leadfoot" Len Brock ( (Australia) ) (Speedcar) †
- Barry Butterworth ( (New Zealand) ) (Speedcar)
- Kenny Carter ( (England) ) (Solo) †
- Peter Collins ( (England) ) (Solo)*
- Phil Crump ( (Australia) ) (Solo)
- Bryan Cunneen ( (Australia) ) (Speedcar)
- Peter Cunneen ( (Australia) ) (Speedcar) †
- Jimmy Davies ( (United States) ) (Speedcar) †
- Jay Drake ( (United States) ) (Speedcar)
- Max Dumesny ( (Australia) ) (Sprintcar/Speedcar)
- Sprouts Elder ( (United States) ) (Solo) †
- Jeff Freeman ( (Australia) ) (Speedcar) †
- Ove Fundin ( (Sweden) ) (Solo)*
- Max Grosskreutz ( (Australia) ) (Solo) †
- Gordon Guasco ( (Australia) ) (Solo) †
- John Harvey ( (Australia) ) (Speedcar)
- Steve Kinser ( (United States) ) (Sprintcar)
- Wilbur Lamoreaux ( (United States) ) (Solo) †
- Aub Lawson ( (Australia) ) (Solo) †
- Ronald Mackay (Speedcar)
- Ivan Mauger ( (New Zealand) ) (Solo)*
- Ken McKinlay ( (Scotland) ) (Solo) †
- Anders Michanek ( (Sweden) ) (Solo)*
- Cordy Milne ( (United States) ) (Solo) †
- Jack Milne ( (United States) ) (Solo) †
- Ole Olsen ( (Denmark) ) (Solo)*
- Jack Parker ( (England) ) (Solo) †
- Bruce Penhall ( (United States) ) (Solo)*
- Howard Revell ( (Australia) ) (Speedcar/Sedan) †
- Ray Revell ( (Australia) ) (Speedcar/Stockcar)
- Garry Rush ( (Australia) ) (Super Modified/Speedcar/Sprintcar)
- Billy Sanders ( (Australia) ) (Solo) †
- Marshall Sargent ( (United States) ) (Super Modified) †
- Mitch Shirra ( (New Zealand) ) (Solo)
- Tiger Stevenson ( (England) ) (Solo) †
- Johnny Stewart ( (Australia) ) (Speedcar) †
- Brooke Tatnell ( (Australia) ) (Speedcar)
- George Tatnell ( (Australia) ) (Super Modified/Sprintcar/Speedcar/Stockcar) †
- Bob "Two Gun" Tattersall ( (United States) ) (Speedcar) †
- Ron "Sleepy" Tripp ( (United States) ) (Speedcar)
- Bob Valentine ( (Australia) ) (Solo)* †
- Harry Whitfield ( (England) ) (Solo) †
- Bill Wigzell ( (Australia) ) (Speedcar/Super Modified) †
- Bluey Wilkinson ( (Australia) ) (Solo)* †
- Freddie Williams ( (Wales) ) (Solo)* †
- Jim Winterbottom ( (Australia) ) (Super Modified/Sprintcar)
- Doug Wolfgang ( (United States) ) (Sprintcar)
- Lionel Van Praag ( (Australia) ) (Solo)* †
- Jack Young ( (Australia) ) (Solo)* †

† - Deceased
* - Speedway World Champion
Frank "Satan" Brewer was actually from New Zealand but promoters advertised him as being from the United States to bring in larger crowds
