= Gosford Showground =

Multi-use stadium in Gosford, Australia

- Interactive map of Gosford Showground
- Location: Showground Road, Gosford NSW 2250, Australia
- Coordinates: 33°24′51″S 151°20′28″E

Construction
- Opened: 18 February 1936

Gosford Showground is a muli-use stadium in Gosford, Australia. It is mainly used for greyhound racing and motorcycle speedway.

== Greyhound Racing ==
The stadium was opened on 18 February 1936 by the Gosford Greyhound Racing Club. The track, throughout its history has run greyhound racing.

== Motorcycle speedway ==
The speedway track is located inside the greyhound course and has also been known as the Central Coast Speedway.

The track has been a significant venue for important motorcycle speedway events, including qualifying rounds of the Speedway World Championship (the first in 1994).

It has also held the final of the Australian Solo Championship (the first in 1995) and the New South Wales Individual Speedway Championship on 13 occasions from 1994 to 2009.
