= Cameron Woodward =

Australian speedway rider (born 1985)

- Born: 8 January 1985 (age 41); Mildura, Victoria, Australia
- Nationality: Australian

Career history

Great Britain
- 2003: Poole Pirates
- 2004–2005: Edinburgh Monarchs
- 2005–2014: Eastbourne Eagles

Sweden
- 2006: Getingarna
- 2008: Valsarna
- 2014: Indianerna

Poland
- 2008–2009: Rzeszów
- 2010: Miskolc
- 2011–2014: Lublin

Denmark
- 2013: Slangerup
- 2014: Holstebro

Individual honours
- 2006, 2008, 2009, 2014: Victoria State Champion
- 2014: South Australian Champion

Team honours
- 2008: Elite League Knockout Cup
- 2009: Elite Shield

Cameron Jackson Woodward (born 8 January 1985) is an Australian former motorcycle speedway rider, who has won the Victorian State Championship on three occasions.

== Career ==
A product of junior speedway at the Olympic Park Speedway in Mildura (where the likes of Phil Crump, Jason Crump and Leigh Adams learnt their trade), Woodward gained experience of racing in Australia before starting his British speedway career in 2003 in the Elite League with Poole Pirates, and initially combined speedway racing with his job back in Australia as a plumber. He then spent the 2004 and 2005 seasons in the Premier League with Edinburgh Monarchs, his average rising to over 7. He returned to the Elite League with Eastbourne Eagles in 2006, and after rising through the team, in a spell when the team won the Elite League Knockout Cup in 2008 and the Elite Shield in 2009, was given the team captaincy in 2010, and has remained with the team since.

In 2008 and 2009, Woodward also rode the Polish Ekstraliga for Stal Rzeszów, moving on to Miskolc in 2010. Since 2011, he has ridden for KMŻ Lublin.

Woodward first won the Victoria State Championship in the 2005/6 season and won it again in 2007/8 and 2008/9. In 2012, he finished in third place in the Australian National Championship.

Woodward also competes in long track speedway, and took part in the World Championship in 2012, finishing in sixth place overall.

Woodward also competes in grasstrack racing, and won the British Masters Championship in 2012.

Woodward was the 2014 South Australian Champion, winning the title at Adelaide's Gillman Speedway on 7 December 2013.

Woodward's 2014 season was ended by a broken femur sustained in a crash while riding in Poland in September. While it was anticipated that he would be fit for the start of the 2015 season, and after signing for Coventry Bees, Indianerna and Lokomotiv Daugavpils in January a check-up revealed that the break hadn't healed and a bone graft would be required, meaning that he would miss the early part of the season.

== Championship record ==
- Australian Championship: 3rd (2012)
- Victoria State Championship: Won 2005/6, 2007/8, 2008/9
- Australian Under-21 Championship: 3rd (2002), 2nd (2003), 3rd (2005), 4th (2006)

== World Longtrack Championship ==
=== Grand-Prix Series ===
- 2012 - 6 apps (6th) 92pts
- 2013 - 6 apps (5th) 90pts
- 2014 - 3 apps (15th) 12pts

=== Best results ===
- (Poland) Rzeszów Second 2013
- (Germany) Vechta Third 2012, 2013

=== Team Championship ===
- 2013 (England) Folkestone (5th) 25/36pts (Rode with Hunter Anderson, Rodney McDonald)

== British Masters Grasstrack Championship ==
- 2012 (United Kingdom) Frittenden (Champion)
- 2013 (United Kingdom) Wimborne (Champion)
