= Aub Lawson =

Australian speedway rider

- Born: 5 April 1914; Warialda, New South Wales
- Died: 20 January 1977 (aged 62)
- Nationality: Australian

Career history
- 1939: Wembley Lions
- 1939: Middlesbrough Bears
- 1947-1951: West Ham Hammers
- 1953-1960: Norwich Stars

Individual honours
- 1951: London Riders' Championship
- 1948, 1950, 1953, 1954, 1963: NSW State Champion
- 1949: SA State Champion
- 1952, 1956: Qld State Champion
- 1961: WA State Champion
- 1951: The Laurels

Team honours
- 1955: National Trophy

Aubrey "Aub" Lawson (born 5 April 1914 in Kelly's Gully, Warialda, New South Wales - died 20 January 1977) was an Australian international speedway rider who featured in ten World Championship finals including the 1939 final which was never run due to the outbreak of World War II.

== Career ==
Lawson first came to the UK in 1939 and rode in two leagues for the Wembley Lions and Middlesbrough Bears but at his mother's insistence, his sister accompanied him as chaperone.

It was not until after the war in 1947 that Lawson returned to the UK when league racing started again. He joined the West Ham Hammers where he stayed for five seasons, top scoring in three of them. In 1951, he won the London Riders' Championship whilst riding for the Hammers. After a year back in Australia, he returned to the UK where he joined the Norwich Stars, where he remained until he retired from racing in 1960. Lawson then returned to Australia where he continued racing in Sydney, winning his then record fifth NSW Championship in 1963, adding to those he had won in 1948, 1950, 1953 and 1954.

== World final appearances ==
- 1939 - (England) London, Wembley Stadium - Event cancelled due to World War II
- 1949 - (England) London, Wembley Stadium - 8th - 8pts
- 1950 - (England) London, Wembley Stadium - 4th - 10pts
- 1951 - (England) London, Wembley Stadium - 10th - 7pts
- 1953 - (England) London, Wembley Stadium - 9th - 7pts
- 1954 - (England) London, Wembley Stadium - 14th - 4pts
- 1957 - (England) London, Wembley Stadium - 4th - 11pts
- 1958 - (England) London, Wembley Stadium - 3rd - 11pts
- 1959 - (England) London, Wembley Stadium - 5th - 11pts
- 1960 - (England) London, Wembley Stadium - 14th - 4pts
