= Newcastle Showground =

Showground in Newcastle, Australia

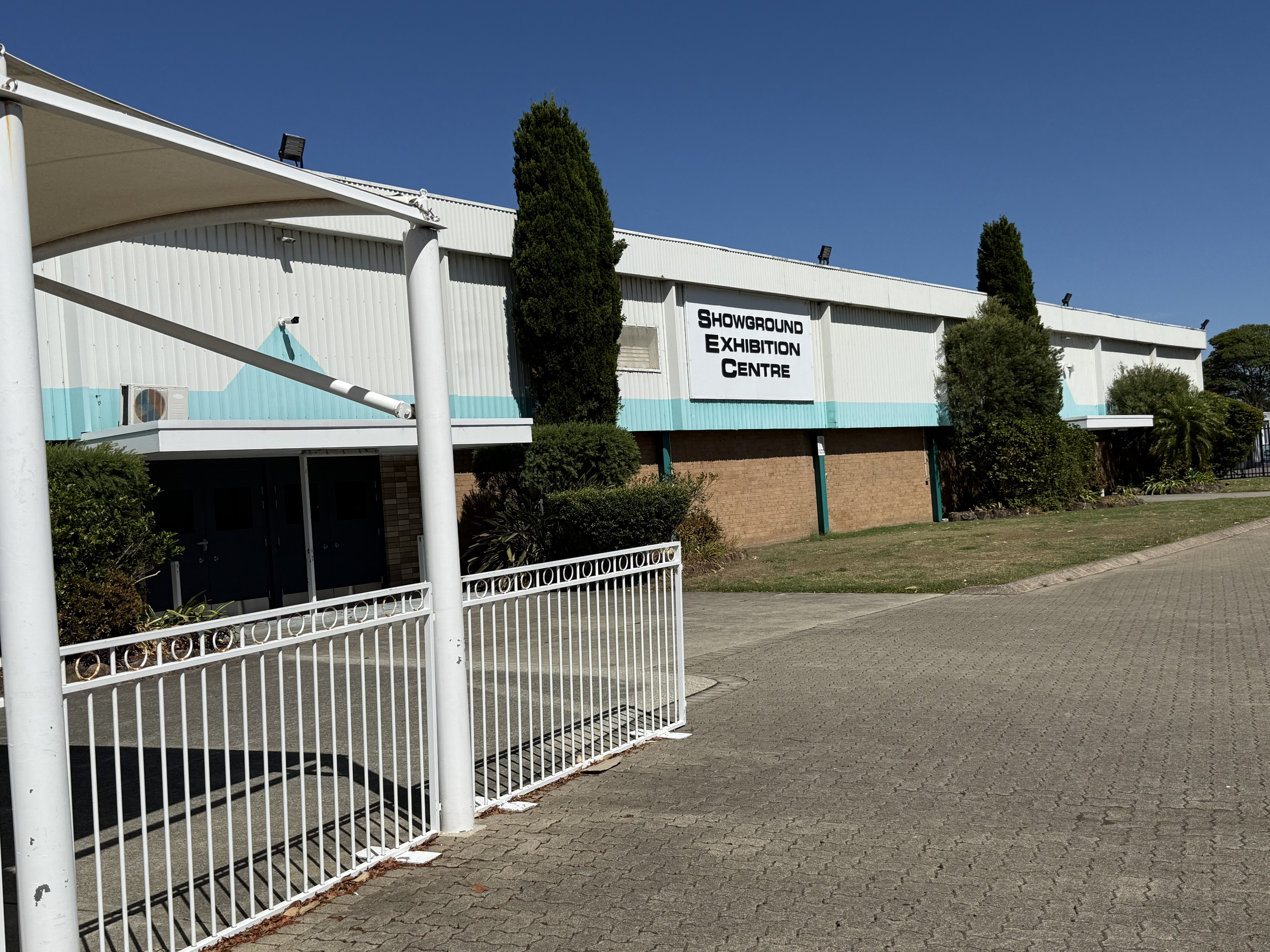
- Showground Exhibition Centre, 2025
- Interactive map of Newcastle Showground
- Location: Brown Road, Broadmeadow, New South Wales, Australia
- Coordinates: 32°55′08″S 151°44′08″E
- Public transit: Broadmeadow railway station

Construction
- Opened: 17 May 1902

Newcastle Showground is an outdoor recreational area located on Griffiths Road, in the Newcastle suburb of Broadmeadow, Australia. It hosts the Newcastle Show and within the showground is the Newcastle Entertainment Centre.

== History ==
The showground was first used on 17 May 1902. It was used as an agricultural and horticultural show up until 1916, when it was required by the military during World War I. The showground was used again by the military from 1941 until 1945 due to World War II.

Rugby league team Newcastle Rebels competed in the NSWRFL Premiership in 1908 and 1909 at the Newcastle Showground.

Motorcycle speedway made its debut at the Showground in-between the wars and hosted the inaugural Australian Solo Championship in 1926. It also held the New South Wales Individual Speedway Championship in 1947/ 1948.

The showground speedway also hosted the Australian Sidecar Speedway Championship in 2010.
