= Australia national speedway team =

Australian national motorcycle speedway team

Australia
- Nation colour: Green/Yellow
- SWC wins: 4 (1976, 1999, 2001, 2002); Speedway of Nations; 2 (2002, 2025)

The Australia national speedway team is one of the leading teams in international motorcycle speedway, with the country regarded as the birthplace of the sport in the 1920s. The team are six-times champions of the world having won the sports premier team competition in 1976, 1999, 2001, 2002, 2022 and 2025.

== History ==
The national speedway team held test matches against the England as early as 1928, although the first official test match is listed as 30 June 1930 at Wimbledon Stadium.

The team won its first Speedway World Team Cup in 1976, with captain John Boulger, Phil Crump, Billy Sanders and Phil Herne. They had to wait over 30 years before winning three tournaments out of four, between 1999 and 2002. Key riders during the period were Jason Crump, Leigh Adams, Ryan Sullivan and Todd Wiltshire, who all took part in three wins, while Jason Lyons rode in two (1999 and 2002) and Craig Boyce rode in 2001.

The fifth and sixth successes came in the 2022 Speedway of Nations and the 2025 Speedway of Nations respectively (the alternate competition to the World Cup) with the squad members being Jack Holder, Brady Kurtz, Max Fricke and Jason Doyle.

Four times Australian champion Jim Airey is the only Australian rider to win the World Team Cup not riding for Australia. He won the 1971 Speedway World Team Cup in Wrocław, Poland, as part of the Great Britain team.

== Major tournament wins ==
=== World Team Championships ===
Year	Venue	Standings (Pts)	Australia Riders and Pts	
1976	(England); London; White City Stadium	1. Australia (31); 2. Poland (28); 3. Sweden (26); 4. Soviet Union (11)	Phil Crump	11
1976	(England); London; White City Stadium	1. Australia (31); 2. Poland (28); 3. Sweden (26); 4. Soviet Union (11)	Billy Sanders	7
1976	(England); London; White City Stadium	1. Australia (31); 2. Poland (28); 3. Sweden (26); 4. Soviet Union (11)	Phil Herne	7
1976	(England); London; White City Stadium	1. Australia (31); 2. Poland (28); 3. Sweden (26); 4. Soviet Union (11)	John Boulger	6
1976	(England); London; White City Stadium	1. Australia (31); 2. Poland (28); 3. Sweden (26); 4. Soviet Union (11)	Garry Middleton	-
1999	(Czech Republic); Pardubice; Svítkov Stadion	1. Australia (51); 2. Czech Republic (35); 3. (United States) USA (29); 4. England (29)	Leigh Adams	14
1999	(Czech Republic); Pardubice; Svítkov Stadion	1. Australia (51); 2. Czech Republic (35); 3. (United States) USA (29); 4. England (29)	Jason Crump	13+1
1999	(Czech Republic); Pardubice; Svítkov Stadion	1. Australia (51); 2. Czech Republic (35); 3. (United States) USA (29); 4. England (29)	Ryan Sullivan	12+3
1999	(Czech Republic); Pardubice; Svítkov Stadion	1. Australia (51); 2. Czech Republic (35); 3. (United States) USA (29); 4. England (29)	Jason Lyons	10+3
1999	(Czech Republic); Pardubice; Svítkov Stadion	1. Australia (51); 2. Czech Republic (35); 3. (United States) USA (29); 4. England (29)	Todd Wiltshire	2+1
2001	(Poland); Wrocław; Olympic Stadium	1. Australia (68); 2. Poland (65); 3. Sweden (51); 4. Denmark (44); 5. (United States) USA (30)	Jason Crump	20
2001	(Poland); Wrocław; Olympic Stadium	1. Australia (68); 2. Poland (65); 3. Sweden (51); 4. Denmark (44); 5. (United States) USA (30)	Leigh Adams	16
2001	(Poland); Wrocław; Olympic Stadium	1. Australia (68); 2. Poland (65); 3. Sweden (51); 4. Denmark (44); 5. (United States) USA (30)	Ryan Sullivan	13
2001	(Poland); Wrocław; Olympic Stadium	1. Australia (68); 2. Poland (65); 3. Sweden (51); 4. Denmark (44); 5. (United States) USA (30)	Todd Wiltshire	10
2001	(Poland); Wrocław; Olympic Stadium	1. Australia (68); 2. Poland (65); 3. Sweden (51); 4. Denmark (44); 5. (United States) USA (30)	Craig Boyce	9
2002	Peterborough; East of England Showground	1. Australia (64); 2. Denmark (58); 3. Sweden (54); 4. Poland (48); 5. Czech Republic (36)	Leigh Adams	17
2002	Peterborough; East of England Showground	1. Australia (64); 2. Denmark (58); 3. Sweden (54); 4. Poland (48); 5. Czech Republic (36)	Ryan Sullivan	17
2002	Peterborough; East of England Showground	1. Australia (64); 2. Denmark (58); 3. Sweden (54); 4. Poland (48); 5. Czech Republic (36)	Jason Crump	14
2002	Peterborough; East of England Showground	1. Australia (64); 2. Denmark (58); 3. Sweden (54); 4. Poland (48); 5. Czech Republic (36)	Todd Wiltshire	13
2002	Peterborough; East of England Showground	1. Australia (64); 2. Denmark (58); 3. Sweden (54); 4. Poland (48); 5. Czech Republic (36)	Jason Lyons	3
2022	(Denmark); Vojens; Vojens Speedway Center	1. Australia (30); 2. (United Kingdom) Great Britain (32); 3. Sweden (30); 4. Denmark (28); 5. Czech Republic (27); 6. Poland (26); 7. Finland (16)	Jack Holder	19+4+4
2022	(Denmark); Vojens; Vojens Speedway Center	1. Australia (30); 2. (United Kingdom) Great Britain (32); 3. Sweden (30); 4. Denmark (28); 5. Czech Republic (27); 6. Poland (26); 7. Finland (16)	Max Fricke	11+3+2
2022	(Denmark); Vojens; Vojens Speedway Center	1. Australia (30); 2. (United Kingdom) Great Britain (32); 3. Sweden (30); 4. Denmark (28); 5. Czech Republic (27); 6. Poland (26); 7. Finland (16)	Jason Doyle	res
2025	(Poland); Toruń; MotoArena Toruń	1. Australia (37); 2. Poland (35); 3. Denmark (34); 4. Sweden (27); 5. (United Kingdom) Great Britain (24); 6. Latvia (18); 7. (Czech Republic) Czechia (14)	Brady Kurtz	20+4
2025	(Poland); Toruń; MotoArena Toruń	1. Australia (37); 2. Poland (35); 3. Denmark (34); 4. Sweden (27); 5. (United Kingdom) Great Britain (24); 6. Latvia (18); 7. (Czech Republic) Czechia (14)	Jack Holder	17+3
2025	(Poland); Toruń; MotoArena Toruń	1. Australia (37); 2. Poland (35); 3. Denmark (34); 4. Sweden (27); 5. (United Kingdom) Great Britain (24); 6. Latvia (18); 7. (Czech Republic) Czechia (14)	Jason Doyle	res

== International caps (as of 2022) ==
Since the advent of the Speedway Grand Prix era, international caps earned by riders is largely restricted to international competitions, whereas previously test matches between two teams were a regular occurrence. This means that the number of caps earned by a rider has decreased in the modern era.

Rider	Caps
Adams, Leigh	71
Airey, Jim	36
Allan, Gary*	1
Amundson, Kym	4
Amundson, Robin	1
Arnfield, Jack	1
Arthur, Frank	15
Bainbridge, Junior	9
Baker, Steve	13
Bartlett, Greg	1
Bass, Chris	7
Batchelor, Troy	9
Bear, Stan	4
Benson, Lionel	3
Bentzen, Les	1
Bibby, Jack	4
Biggs, Jack	39
Blackadder, Robbie	4
Blake, Bobby	1
Blight, Ernie	3
Board, Johnny	1
Boulger, John	65
Bowerman, John	1
Bowes, Shane	51
Boyce, Craig	45
Boyle, Tony	1
Bradshaw, Peter	1
Bryden, Bill	10
Butler, Troy	28
Cameron, Ken	3
Carlson, Mark	6
Case, Dick	39
Catlett, Stan	1
Chamberlain, Johnny	6
Chapman, Jack	17
Cheshire David	3
Chessell, Rod	1
Chignell, Jack	5
Clay, Norman	2
Coddington, Neil	8
Collins, Eric	9
Colquhoun, Rod	3
Cox, Keith	5
Cresp, Ray	4
Crump, Jason	51
Crump, Phil	76
Curtis, Geoff	9
Davies, Stephen	27
Day, Ricky	10
Dolan, Frank	8
Doyle, Glenn	20
Duckett, Frank	20
Duggan, Ray	14
Duggan, Vic	30
Dykes, Peter	1
Evans, Ernie	8
Farrell, Mike	12
Fenn, Eric	8
Fiora, Mike	6
Forrest, Wayne	3
Galloway, Billy	1
Gavros, Dennis	3
Geran, Jack	11
Grosskreutz, Max	57
Guasco, Gordon	10
Guglielmi, Gary	14
Gurtner, Keith	23
Hansen, Arnie	3
Harding, Merv	11
Hastings, Harold	1
Henderson, Ron	2
Herne, Phil	41
Hewitt, Les	1
Hibberd, Buzz	1
Hodgson, Craig	8
Holder, Chris	17
Humphreys, Bob	12
Hunter, Alec	3
Hunter, Rod	3
Huxley, Vic	47
Hyland, Jack	2
Hynes, Dave	1
Ingram, Peter	2
Isbel, Clayton	1
Jackson, Dave	4
Johnson, Ron	59
Johnston, Steve	16
Kennedy, Danny	10
Kentwell, Greg	18
Kingston, Bert	9
Koppe, Steve	16
Lamont, Billy	15
Landels, Bill*	8
Langdon, Tony	8
Langfield, John	50
Langton, Steve	2
Lawson, Aub	70
Lawson, Don	4
Le Breton, Ken	12
Leisk, Les	9
Lemon, Mark	8
Leverenz, Bob	10
Levy, Lionel	16
Lewis, Harry	1
Lindsay, Norman	1
Little, Wally	13
Loakes, Bryan	7
Longley, Bill	39
Lyons, Jason	35
MacDonald, Kevin	1
McCallum, Bruce	1
McDonald, Glenn	5
McGowan, Travis	2
McKean, Dudley	2
McKeown, Mick	11
McLachlan, Doug	2
Maxfield, Rob	1
Melluish, Bill	2
Menzies, Andy	6
Middleton, Garry	1
Mills, Dave	1
Mitchell, Clem	29
Mitchell, Lindsay	2
Monk, Charlie	26
Moore, Peter	22
Moore, Ronnie	13
Mountford, Stuart	3
Mudge, Geoff	10
Murphy, Mick	7
Murray, Ken	2
Norman, Scott	2
Nunan, Tim	2
O'Brien, Trevor	1
Parker, Shane	20
Payne, Arthur	18
Pearce, Frank	8
Poole, Mick	22
Prettjohn, Dave	2
Proctor, Ty	3
Quinn, Allan	1
Regeling, Steve	28
Reinke, Steve	16
Rivett, Alan*	9
Rogers, Bill	13
Ryan, Buck	6
Ryman, Jim	2
Sanders, Billy	67
Sansom, Lou	3
Sawyer, Les	1
Schlam, Sig	1
Schlein, Rory	10
Scott, Jack	7
Sedgmen, Justin	1
Seers, Dick	1
Sharp, Jack	14
Sharp, Bob	13
Sharpe, Les	8
Shields, Adam	6
Shields, Dave	1
Shirra, Mitch*	2
Smythe, Dick	10
Spencer, Bert	6
Spinks, Charlie	26
Stewart Col	1
Stewart, Len	1
Street, Neil	9
Sullivan, Ryan	33
Sulway, Dick	3
Taylor, Alby	2
Taylor, Chum	28
Taylor, Glyn	8
Taylor, Ray	4
Thompson, Peter	6
Titman, John	61
Torpie, Kevin	14
Tremmeling, Nigel	1
Tulloch, Terry	2
Underwood, Doug	2
Valentine, Bob	24
Van Praag, Lionel	54
Vandenberg, Peter	2
Walsh, Ken	3
Ward, Darcy	8
Warren, Graham	29
Watson, Cliff	14
Watson, Noel	4
Watt, Davey	18
White, Doug	7
Wilkinson, Bluey	63
Wiltshire, Todd	29
Wise, Dick	4
Woods, Len	2
Woodward, Cameron	1
Wright, Keith	1
Young, Frank	1
Young, Jack	32

Riders marked with an asterisk represented Australia but were not Australian.

== See also ==
- Australian under-21 speedway team
- Australian Individual Speedway Championship
