= Olympic Park Speedway (Mildura) =

Motorcycle speedway in Mildura, Australia

- Location: 36 Winton Drive, Mildura, Victoria 3500
- Coordinates: 34°09′32″S 142°07′40″E
- Operator: Mildura Motorcycle Club
- Opened: 1947
- Major events: Australian Solo Championship; Australian Sidecar Championship; Victorian Solo Championship; Victoria Sidecar Championship

Speedway
- Surface: Dolomite, crushed granite and clay mix
- Length: 302 m (0.188 mi)

Junior Speedway Track
- Surface: Dolomite, crushed granite and clay mix

The Olympic Park Speedway is a motorcycle speedway located alongside the Murray River, at Olympic Park, Mildura, Victoria, Australia. The track is operated by the Mildura Motorcycle Club and hosts rounds of the Australian Solo Championship, the Victorian Solo Championship, the Australian Sidecar Championship and the Victorian Sidecar Championship. The speedway track has a circumference of 302 metres and a junior track with a circumference of 112 metres.

== History ==
Historically the venue has hosted many important motorcycle speedway events, including qualifying rounds of the Speedway World Championship and multiple finals of the Australian Solo Championships, the first in 1979.

The 2023 edition of the Australian Championships was cancelled due to the surrounding area being flooded when the Murray River broke its banks.

== See also ==
- Motorsport in Australia
- Motorcycle speedway
- Sidecar speedway
