= Motorcycling Australia =

Governing body for motorcycle racing

- Sport: Motorcycling
- Founded: 1992
- Affiliation: Fédération Internationale de Motocyclisme
- Regional affiliation: FIM Oceania
- Headquarters: Melbourne, Victoria
- President: Peter Goddard (Acting)
- CEO: Peter Doyle
- Replaced: Auto Cycle Council of Australia
- (founded): 1928

Official website
- www.ma.org.au
- (Australia)

Motorcycling Australia is the governing body for motorcycle racing in Australia, covering road racing, motocross, trials, supercross, dirt track, supermoto and speedway. Motorcycling Australia is affiliated with the international governing body, Fédération Internationale de Motocyclisme (FIM), based in Geneva, Switzerland.

The body oversees state governing bodies Motorcycling New South Wales, Motorcycling Victoria, Motorcycling Queensland, Motorcycling South Australia, Motorcycling Western Australia, Motorcycling Tasmania and Motorcycling Northern Territory.

Originally formed in 1928 as the Auto Cycle Council of Australia (ACCA), the name changed to Motorcycling Australia in 1992. Today, the organisation has in excess of 21,000 competitors, more than 350 affiliated clubs, and over 3000 registered officials.

== History ==
Originally formed in 1928 as the Auto Cycle Council of Australia (ACCA), the name changed to Motorcycling Australia in 1992. The organisation joined the FIM in 1975.

Today it has over 32,700 members, with over 350 affiliated clubs and 3000 officials.

== Series ==
Motorcycling Australia sanctions the following series:

=== Australian Superbike Championship ===
The Australian Superbike Championship (ASBK) is a national motorcycle racing championship in Australia, organized by Motorcycling Australia.

=== Australian Supercross Championship ===
The Australian Supercross Championship was inaugurated in 2015, following on from various series of this discipline of stadium motocross dating back to the late 1970s. The series is usually held over 4-5 rounds across various major stadiums, and takes place in spring and early summer, from October to December. The series incorporates the AUS-X OPEN which also doubles as the first leg of the Oceania Supercross Championship (the second being the SX Open in Auckland), and the Australian Grand Prix of the FIM Supercross World Championship. American Justin Brayton has dominated the series in recent years, winning multiple titles.

=== ProMX ===
The ProMX Motocross Championship (known for sponsorship reasons as the Penrite ProMX Motocross Championship), is the premier Australian Motocross series, sanctioned by Motorcycling Australia. The series runs throughout autumn and winter, before the Supercross stadium series in spring, and features three classes; the premier class MX1, MX2, and MX3, which also features junior riders. An MXW class for women is also part of the series.

=== Australian Enduro Championship (Previously Australian Off Road Championship) ===
The Australian enduro scene launched into a new era in 2025, with a rebrand to the Australian Enduro Championship (AusEnduro) from what was formerly known as the Australian Off-Road Championship (AORC).

In its previous guise as AORC, AusEnduro was first introduced in 2007 after being previously run in 2005 and 2006 as the National Off-Road Series. The Australian Off-Road community were pushing for a nationally recognised championship after only meeting once a year at the Australian Four Day Enduro (A4DE), otherwise their only opportunity to compete was at state championship level. This then prompted the National Off-Road Series and what is now known as AusEnduro. From 2007 until 2009 the championship was promoted privately. In 2010, Motorcycling Australia (MA) took over the management of AusEnduro and continues to manage the championship today.

The Australian Enduro Championship is the official national enduro championship overseen by Motorcycling Australia. Known as AusEnduro, the competition brings together off-road motorcycle riders from across Australia. Several competitors have subsequently participated in international events, including the International Six Days Enduro (ISDE) and world championships.

=== Australian Speedway Championship ===
The Australian Speedway Championship is the premier speedway racing event in Australia.

== See also ==
- Motorsport in Australia
- List of Australian motor racing series
