= Sidewinders Speedway =

Motorcycle speedway in Wingfield, Australia

The Place Where Junior Champions Meet
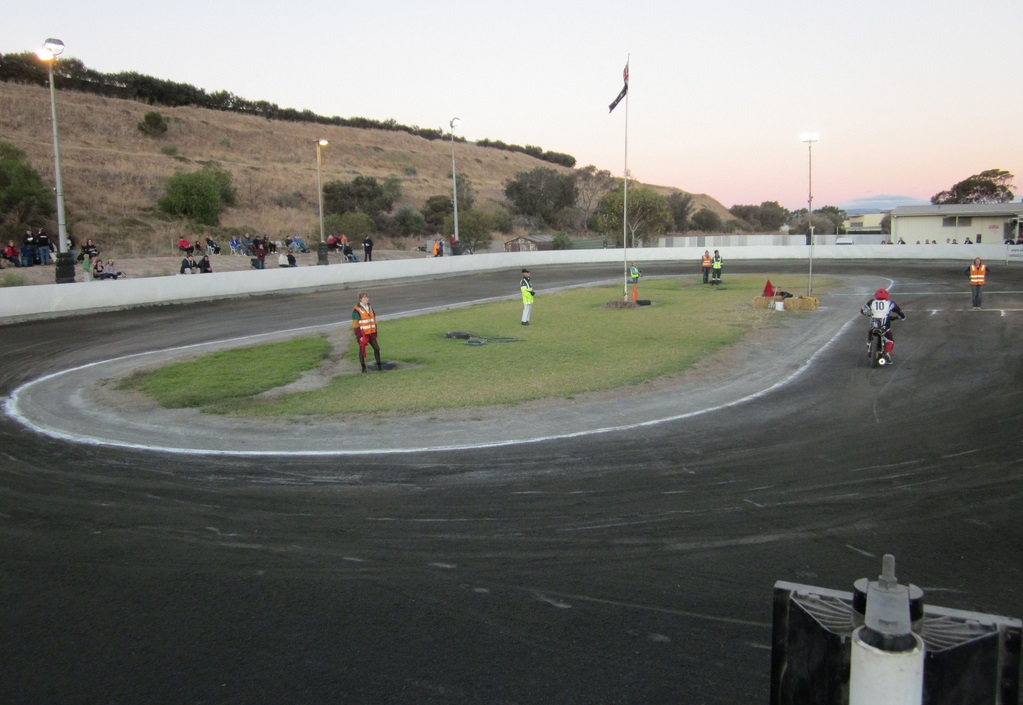
- Sidewinders U/16 Speedway in 2011 showing "Mt. Wingfield" to the left and the clubrooms at the top right
- Location: Wingfield Reserve, Eighth Street; Wingfield, South Australia 5013
- Coordinates: 34°50′12″S 138°33′12″E
- Capacity: 1,000
- Owner: Sidewinders U/16 Speedway Club Inc.
- Operator: Sidewinders U/16 Speedway Club Inc.
- Opened: 25 February 1978
- Major events: Australian Under-16 Solo Championship; South Australian Under-16 Solo Championship; South Australian Under-16 Sidecar Championship; Barb Miller Memorial; Birthday Meeting; Roy Bitmead Cup

Speedway
- Surface: Dolomite
- Length: 0.069 miles (0.112 km)

The Sidewinders Speedway is a junior Motorcycle speedway that was opened in 1978 in the semi-industrial Adelaide suburb of Wingfield in South Australia. The Sidewinders U/16 Speedway Club Inc. was founded two years earlier in 1976 by Graham Baker and Roy Bitmead, with help from Rowley Park Speedway riders Robin and Kym Amundson, and their father Bill. As it was then, Sidewinders goal is to promote and develop speedway through its junior ranks with riders aged 4–15, something that had rarely been done in Australia to that point. Once a rider turns 16 he or she then move into the senior ranks.

Prior to the opening of Sidewinders, most Australian Solo riders came into the sport with a background in Cycle Speedway (in Adelaide this was usually through the Findon Skid Kids cycling club) or through Scrambling, including local Adelaide hero John Boulger who during the 1980s and 1990s was a strong supporter of the speedway (despite having retired from riding in 1983 to move into first the Sprintcar, then the Speedcar ranks), lending his experience, including two Australian Championships, nine South Australian Championships, a World Team Cup win, and two World Final appearances, to up and coming riders.

== Track ==
The 112 metres (122 yards) Sidewinders Speedway, which has a dolomite surface, is the only dedicated, stand alone junior motorcycle speedway track in Australia. Other venues around the country such as the nearby Gillman Speedway, the Olympic Park and Undera Park Speedways in Victoria, and the Loxford Park Speedway in New South Wales, all boast junior tracks on the infield of their main track. The 142 metres (155 yards) Pinjar Park motorcycle speedway just north of Perth in Western Australia is similar to Sidewinders and regularly runs junior events, though the speedway also doubles as Perth's main senior motorcycle speedway.

Sidewinders offers raised viewing on the back straight which allows spectators to see over the fence with an unimpeded view of the entire track. The track also has lights allowing for night racing (installed in 1986) and a raised Control Tower with FIM standard controls for the starting gate and lights, while the pits are located on the outside of turn 4 (the pit gate is located directly to the right of the cover photo). Sidewinders also offers canteen and toilet facilities as well as merchandise sales. Entry is Adults $5.00 and Children U16 Free for race meetings, the venue has a full Canteen and both the Amenities and Canteen have disable access.

Sidewinders is located on North Terrace at the end of Eighth Street Wingfield, and the season runs every fortnight from September to April.

In October 2014, new bays were built in the pits for the first time giving an undercover pit area for riders and their crew to work on their machines as well as giving welcome shade.

In 2017 the Club was leased the land to the west of the venue, from the previous boundary to the Gun Club, from the Port Adelaide/Enfield Council, on which to build a bigger track to be used for training for the 250cc Class. The track will have no track fence but will have sufficient run-offs instead, and there will be no racing conducted on it at all but will give the Intermediate riders a place to hone their skills before going to senior riding at Gillman.

== History ==
Sidewinders, which held its first official meeting on 25 February 1978, has produced some of the biggest names in Australian speedway. Local riders to learn their skills at the speedway include 1983 European (World) Under-21 Champion Steve Baker (son of club founder Graham), Four times South Australian Champions Mark Fiora and Shane Parker, triple SA Champions Craig Hodgson and Ryan Sullivan (winner of the 2004 Australian Solo Championship), current Track Manager and twice SA Champion Scott Norman (his son Jack Norman is currently a rider at the speedway), former World Under-21 Finalist Shane Bowes, and former Moto3 rider Arthur Sissis (who in 2014 made a welcome return to the speedway ranks). Former Riders such as Parker, Norman and Bowes often host various coaching clinics at the speedway, lending their experience to young riders.

Interstate riders who have also excelled at Sidewinders include triple Speedway World Champion Jason Crump, 10 times Australian Champion Leigh Adams and former Victorian and South Australian champion Jason Lyons – all from Mildura (Sidewinders and Mildura would stage "test matches" between the clubs at their respective venues). 2012 World Champion Chris Holder from Sydney and twice World Under-21 Champion Darcy Ward from Queensland have also ridden at the speedway.

Sidewinders hosted the inaugural Australian Under-16 Championship in 1982, and subsequently hosted the Championship, and the Australian Best Pairs Championship in 1985, 1988, 1991, 1997, 2002, 2006 and 2011. Local rider Paul Snadden won the first Australian U/16 title in August 1981 but this subsequently counted as the 1982 title, while other local winners include Shane Parker (1985), Ryan Sullivan (1991), Rusty Harrison (1997), and Dakota Ballentyne (2011). Victorian rider Jason Hawkes (1988, where Jason Crump finished second), Western Australian rider Trevor Harding (2002), another Mildura rider Ryan Sedgmen (2006) and NSW rider Matthew Gilmore (2016) have been the interstate winners. The club also hosts the South Australian Under-16 Solo and Sidecar championships.

Sidewinders U/16 Speedway currently runs between 10 and 13 meetings per season starting in October and finishing in April. Meetings are run every second Saturday night so as not to clash with the bike only Gillman Speedway which also stages junior racing on its 111 metres (121 yards) junior infield track. As speedway in Australia is a summer sport, Sidewinders has a hot weather policy which sometimes sees meetings cancelled if the forecast temperature is too hot (generally 35–40 °C or higher).

Classes that race at Sidewinders Speedway are Junior Solos, Junior Sidecars, Novice Solo Class, Novice Sidecar Class and 50cc Mini Bikes. The club holds regular "Come and Try" events for kids interested in speedway riding. Although Solo and Sidecar racing is generally a male dominated sport, Sidewinders has seen several young girls take up speedway racing.

== See also ==
- Motorcycle speedway
- Gillman Speedway
