= Adelaide Showground =

Showground in Adelaide, South Australia

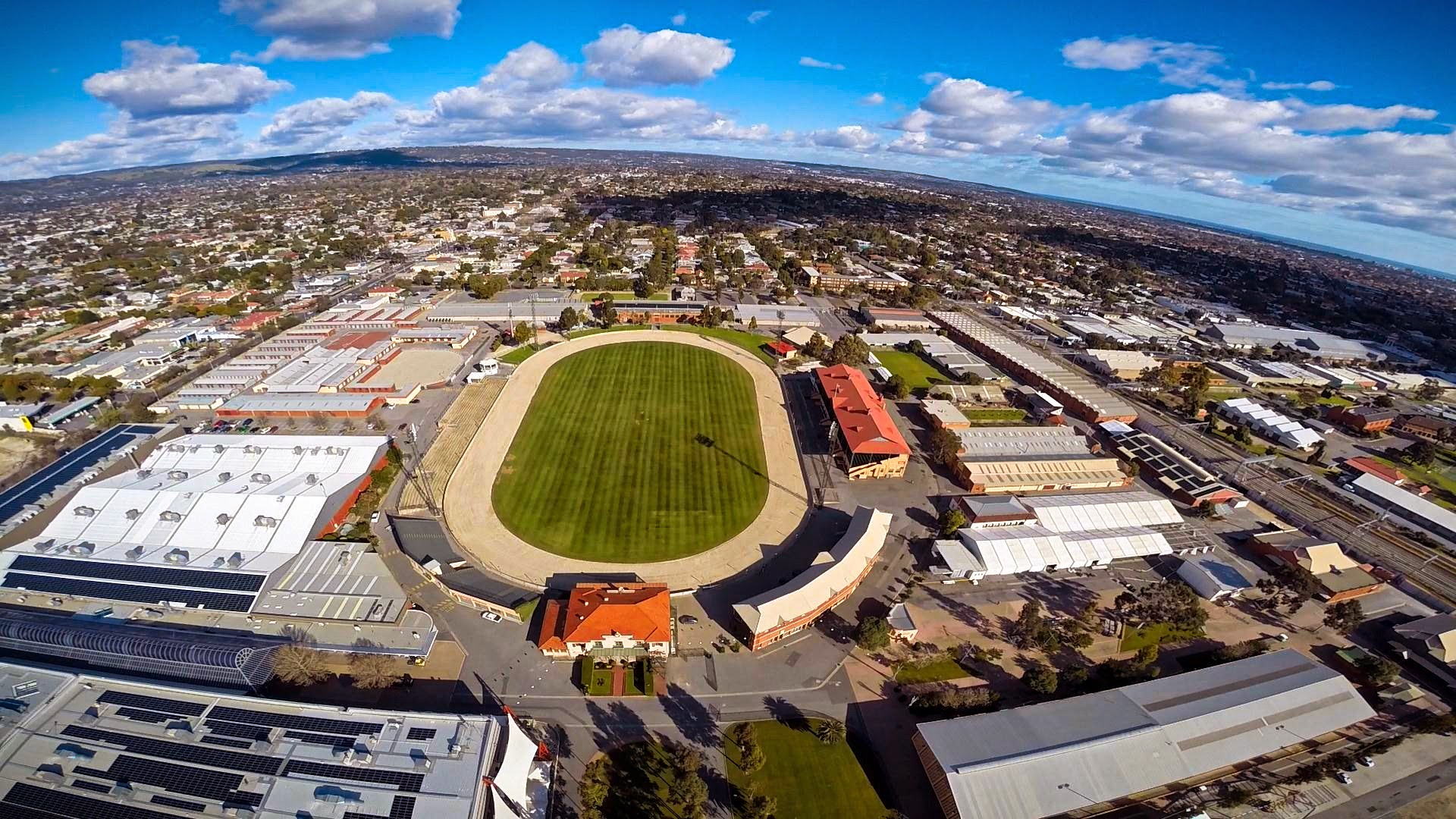
- Location: Wayville, South Australia
- Coordinates: 34°56′48″S 138°35′12″E
- Capacity: 14,000 (current); 35,000 (1930s)
- Owner: Royal Agricultural and Horticultural Society of South Australia
- Operator: Royal Agricultural and Horticultural Society of South Australia (showground); Various (speedway)
- Opened: 1925 (showground); 1926 (speedway); 1934 (harness racing)
- Major events: Royal Adelaide Show; Australian Solo Championship; World Series Sprintcars; West End Speedway International; Castrol Sidecar Cup; Supanova Pop Culture Expo; Inter Dominion; AVCon

Main Arena / Speedway
- Surface: dirt and sand mix
- Length: 0.317 mi (0.510 km)

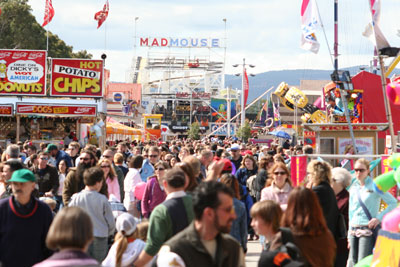
Sideshow Alley at the Royal Adelaide Show. The Mad Mouse was the original roller coaster at the show.

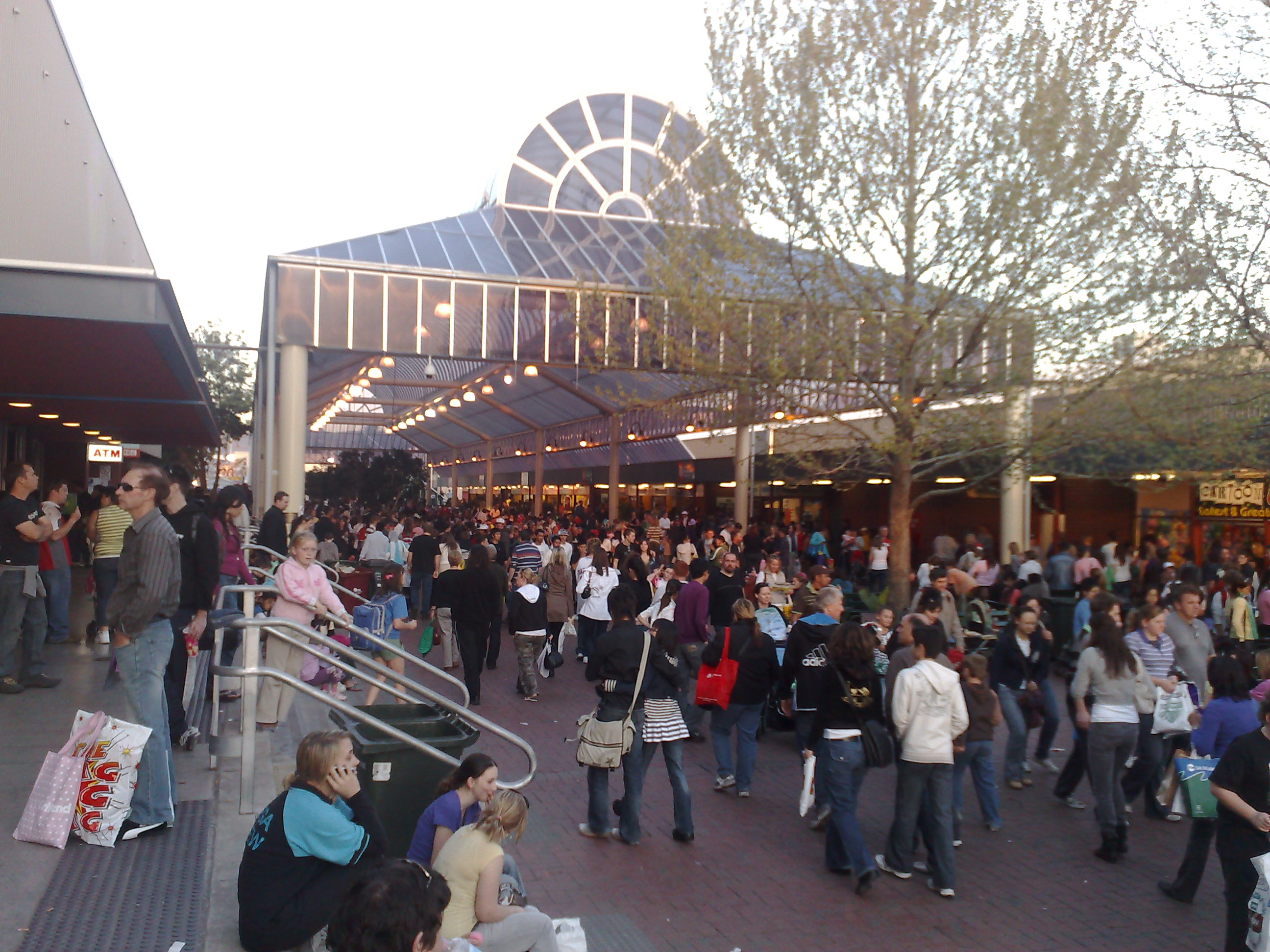
The atrium at the 2007 show

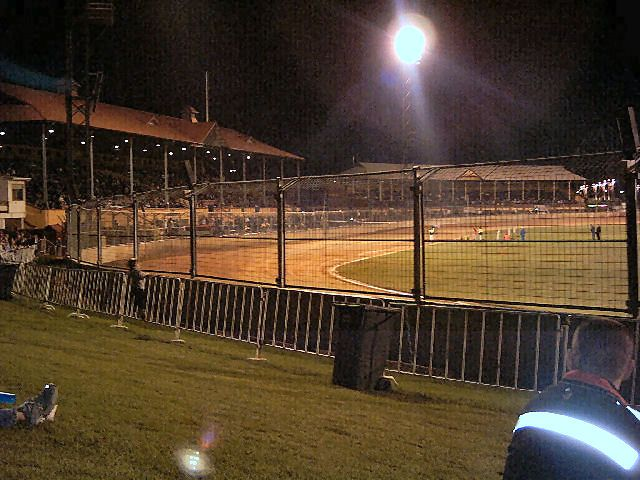
Speedway at the Wayville Showgrounds in 2005

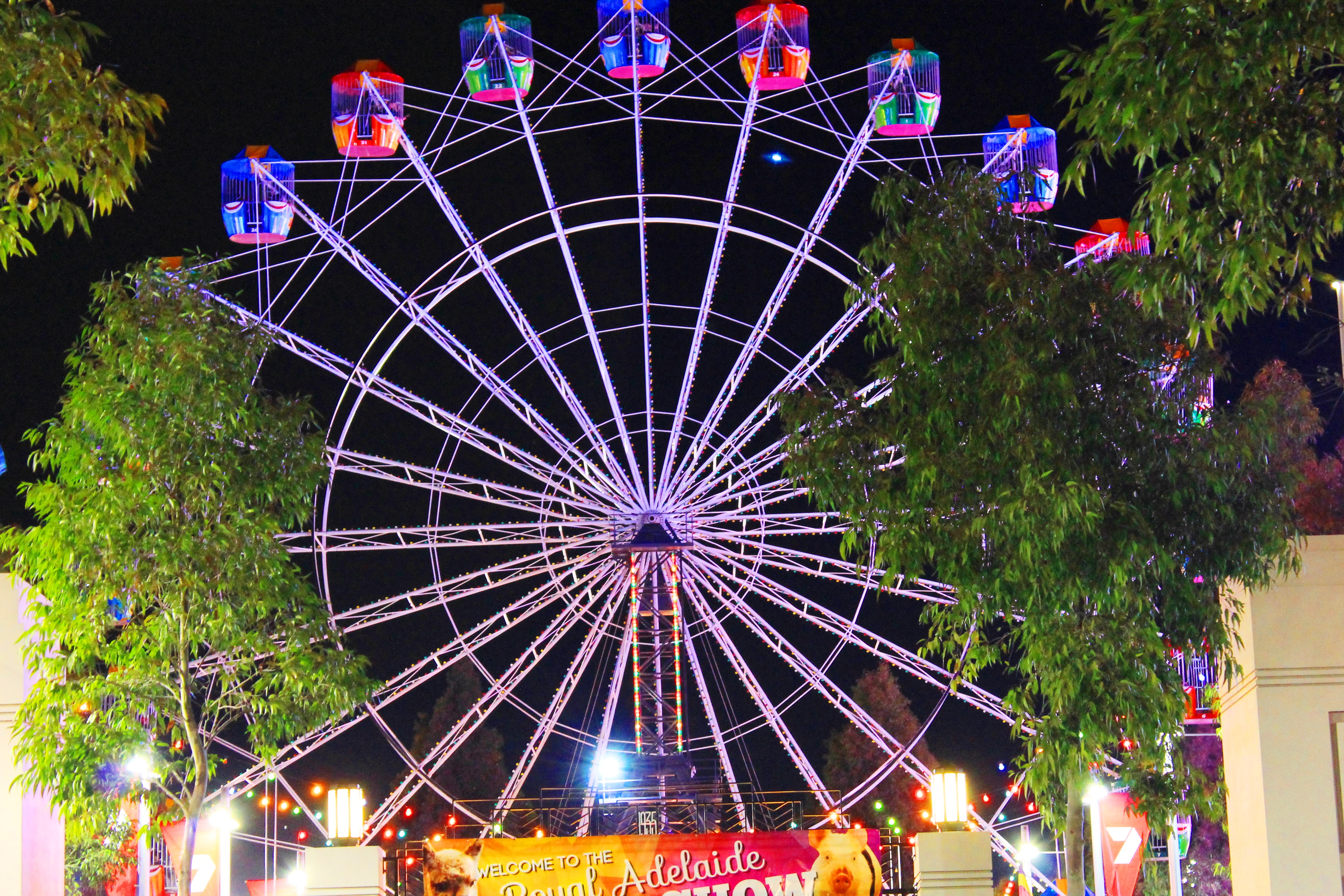
The Ferris Wheel at the Royal Adelaide Show, September 2015

The Adelaide Showground holds many of Adelaide's most popular events, including the Royal Adelaide Show.

The Showground (also popularly known as the Wayville Showgrounds) is located in the inner-southern Adelaide suburb of Wayville, just south of Greenhill Road. They are bordered by Goodwood Road (east), Leader Street (south), the railway line (west) and Rose Terrace (north). The Royal Agricultural and Horticultural Society of South Australia (RAHS) has controlled the site since the 1920s, the land having been purchased by the South Australian government prior to the First World War. The Royal Show moved to the present site in 1925.

The Showground has one of the largest under-cover exhibition spaces in the Southern Hemisphere, and hosts over 140 exhibitions and conferences each year, as well as University of Adelaide and University of South Australia examinations. The RAHS also leases the former Investigator Science and Technology Centre to the Edge Church.

In 2006 it was announced that the formal title of the Showground would be changed from 'Royal Adelaide Showground' to 'Adelaide Showground'.

In 2008 Premier Mike Rann announced that the largest rooftop solar installation in Australia would be installed on the new Goyder Pavilion, the centrepiece of the Adelaide Showground upgrade. The $8 million investment saw 10,000 square metres of solar panels installed, generating 14,00 mega-watt hours of solar electricity, the equivalent to powering 200 South Australian homes and saving 1,400 tonnes of greenhouse gas emissions per year. The size of the project meant that the Adelaide Showground is registered as a power station.

== Main arena ==
=== Speedway ===
The main arena of the Showground, which at its peak in the 1920s and 1930s held 35,000 people, but now can hold approximately 14,000, was known as the Speedway Royal during its heyday from 1926 until 1934, and is sometimes referred to as "The birthplace of Australian Speedway", even though dirt track speedway in Australia actually started in Maitland, New South Wales, in 1923. The Speedway was held on an egg-shaped track that has been the main arena since 1926.

The track itself has a dirt and sand mixture over a concrete base and is 510 metres (560 yards) in length. When used it was one of the fastest speedways in Australia with wide open corners and both the front and back straights being over 90 metres (98 yards) in length. In 1928, Wayville was promoted as "The World's Fastest Dirt Track Speedway".

Wayville stopped hosting speedway meetings after 1934. Reasons for this remain unclear, though one theory is that as the arena was also used year-round as Adelaide's harness racing track it was felt that the speedway meetings chopped the track up too much. Another theory was that due to the Great Depression, the promoters could no longer afford to run meetings at the venue. Other than various demonstration runs at the Royal Adelaide Show, speedway would not return to Wayville until 1986, a gap of 52 years. This event was the first West End Speedway International in February 1986 featuring some of the world's best motorcycle speedway riders. Wayville has also hosted the Australian Solo Championship in 1928 (6 laps), 1929 (3 laps), 1930 (3 laps), 1931 (6 laps), 1932 (3 laps) and again in 2002. It also was the Adelaide venue for the short lived Series 500 (Australian Masters Series) between 1995 and 2000, which featured world championship riders.

Since the mid-1980s, World Champion riders to compete at Wayville have included six time World Champion Ivan Mauger of New Zealand, 1987 West End International winner Hans Nielsen and Tommy Knudsen from Denmark, six time World Champion Tony Rickardsson and 1990 World Champion Per Jonsson from Sweden, Simon Wigg, Michael Lee, Gary Havelock and Kelvin Tatum from England, inaugural West End International winner Rick Miller, Shawn Moran, Sam Ermolenko, Greg Hancock, Bobby Schwartz, and Billy Hamill of the United States, Egon Müller of West Germany, as well as Australia's own Jason Crump and his father Phil Crump, Leigh Adams, Craig Boyce, Todd Wiltshire, and Adelaide's own Steve Baker (the 1983 European (World) Under-21 Champion) and Ryan Sullivan. Other top riders to have raced at Wayville include 1991 West End International winner Shane Bowes, and multiple South Australian Champions Mark Fiora, Shane Parker, and Craig Hodgson.

Riders who appeared at Wayville in its early years included future World Champions Lionel Van Praag (winner of the inaugural World Championship at the Wembley Stadium in 1936) and Bluey Wilkinson. Others included Dicky Smythe, Vic Huxley, Alby Taylor, Sig Schlam, Frank Arthur, as well as local rider Jack Chapman. English stars Jack Parker, Harry Whitfield, and Norman Evans, and America's unofficial World Champion of 1931 Sprouts Elder also appeared at Wayville. Even for regular speedway meetings not involving overseas or interstate riders, crowds at Wayville during this period were regularly around the 25,000 mark, making Wayville the best supported speedway in Australia during its formative years.

It was during this early period in the late 1920s that a young Kym Bonython, later to be the a successful Speedcar driver, art gallery owner and the highly successful promoter of Adelaide's Rowley Park Speedway from 1954 to 1973, got his first taste of a sport which would become a lifelong passion. Bonython had managed to persuade his reluctant mother Lady Jean Bonython to take him to a meeting at Wayville and he was hooked.

On 2 January 1933, Wayville hosted Round 2 of the four round qualifying series for the unofficial World Championship with the final to be held at the 509 metres (557 yards) Sydney Showground Speedway in March 1933. Queensland's Dicky Smythe won the Wayville meeting from Bluey Wilkinson and Norman Evans. Harry Whitfield would win the Final at the Sydney Showground from Australians Billy Lamont and Bluey Wilkinson.

On 12 January 1994, Wayville hosted the final Australia vs England motorcycle speedway test to be held in Australia (as of September 2016). The test was the fourth and final test match of the series which was won 4–0 by the locals. Australia, led by Leigh Adams and Jason Crump, easily won the Wayville test with a score of 61–46. Wayville had hosted its first test, the second test of the 1933–34 series against England, on 7 January 1933. Australia, captained by Frank Arthur, won the test match (held on 7 January 1934) 28–25 with local star Jack Chapman leading the Aussies with 8 points.

Australia's leading Sprintcar series, the World Series Sprintcars has also raced many times at Wayville, although the sand base of the track is not a favourite of the drivers (many drivers likened it to racing on a beach), and the series generally runs at the purpose-built Speedway City when in Adelaide. Sidecar speedway is also popular when run at the Showground, with many high-profile meetings held there including the now defunct "Castrol Cup", as well as exhibition races at the Royal Adelaide Show.

Wayville also hosted the 2001–02 South Australian Speedcar Championship, the first time since 1978/79 that the championship was not held at Speedway City. Former triple Australian Speedcar Champion Warrenne Ekins from the Northern Territory won his second SA title, having previously won in 1997.

Wayville holds the record in Australian speedway for the longest wait between hosting an Australian championship. Before the 2002 Australian Solo Championship, Wayville had not hosted the title since 1932, a gap of an incredible 70 years, only just eclipsing the former record of 69 years between championships held by the Newcastle Showgrounds which hosted four separate Australian championships in 1927, then had to wait until 1996 before the championship would return.

=== Other uses ===
The main arena was also the home ground of the West Adelaide Football Club in the South Australian National Football League from 1927 until it was taken over by the Australian Army after the 1939 season due to the outbreak of World War II. West Adelaide would win the SANFL premiership in 1927, their first year based at the Showground. West Adelaide merged with the Glenelg Football Club during WW2, and from 1940 were forced to play their home games at the Adelaide Oval until their current home, Richmond Oval, was opened in 1958. West Adelaide remain the only SANFL team to use the Showground as their home ground, though in the 2000s there were (ultimately false) rumours that the Sturt Football Club were looking play night football at the Showground (Wayville is in Sturt's Adelaide zone with their home ground Unley Oval just over 2 km away from the Showground). Despite the main arena having suitable lighting, Wayville has never been used for night football.

The 510-metre-long track was also the home of harness racing in Adelaide from 1934 until 1973, when all meetings moved to the longer (845.50 metres), purpose-built Globe Derby Park which had opened in 1969. Wayville, which was shorter than most of the capital city trotting tracks in Australia, hosted the Inter Dominion championships on six occasions – 1937, 1949, 1954, 1958, 1963, and 1969.

Other than hosting various outdoor events during the Royal Adelaide Show, the main arena also hosts the Adelaide leg of the annual Big Day Out music festival, as well as Monster Trucks and Motocross events such as the Supercross Masters.

The showbag hall is used mainly for Adelaide Roller Derby home games.

A pavilion at The Showgrounds was being used to vaccinate people against the COVID-19 virus in 2021.

== Centennial Hall ==
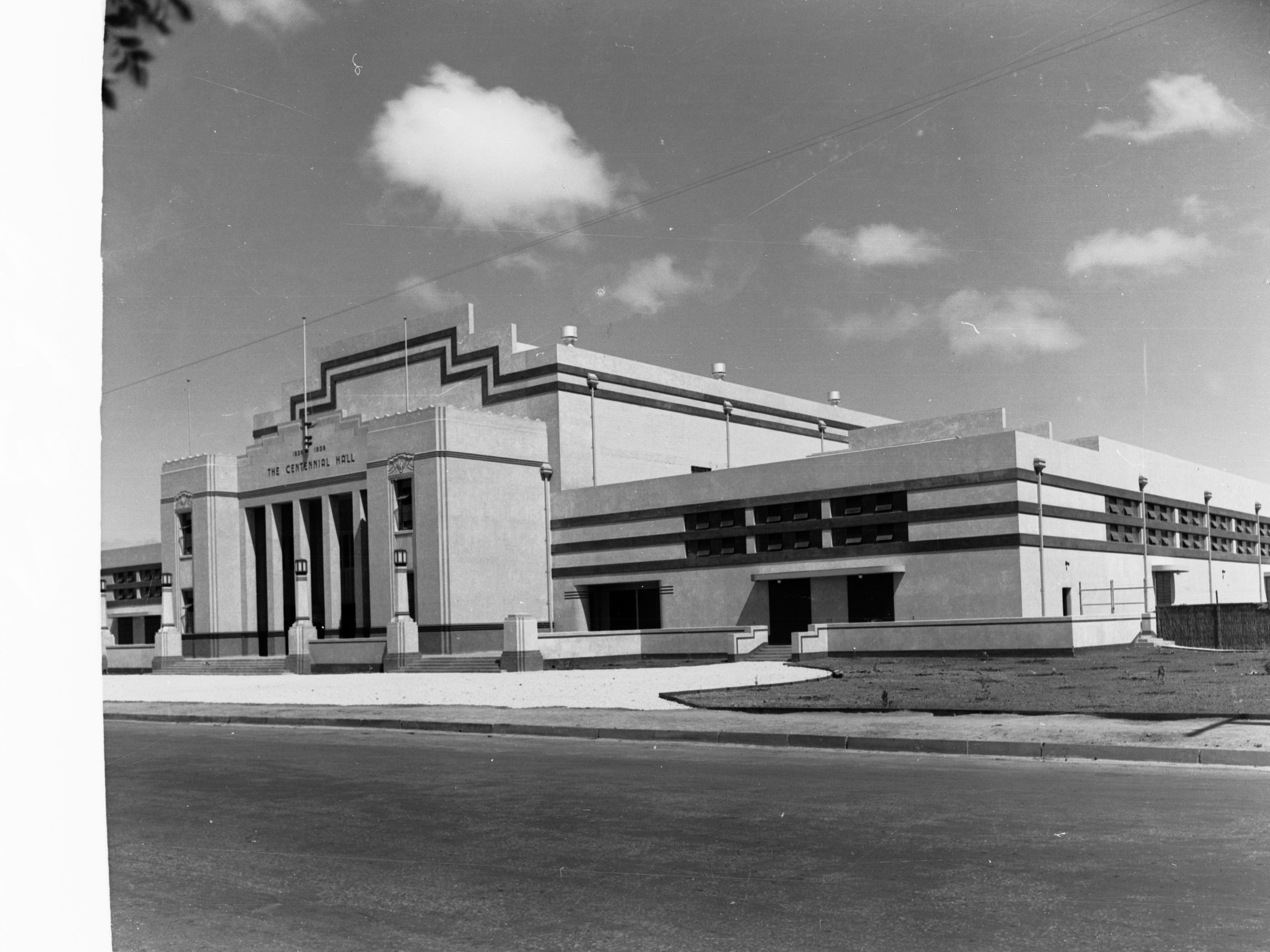
Newly completed Centennial Hall in 1936

Centennial Hall, built to celebrate the centenary of the founding of the Colony (later State) of South Australia, and to house the 1936 Centennial Empire Exhibition, was opened on 20 March 1936. It was considered to be a significant historical landmark, and was one of the few remaining examples of 1930s Art Deco architecture in Adelaide.

However, the building developed "concrete cancer" and was closed at the end of the 2005 Royal Show because it was unsafe. Demolition of Centennial Hall commenced on Wednesday 18 July 2007.

In addition to University exams and the Royal Adelaide Show, some of the more notable events held in Centennial Hall were:

- 12–13 June 1964 - The Beatles' first four Australian concerts.
- 22 February 1966 - The Rolling Stones

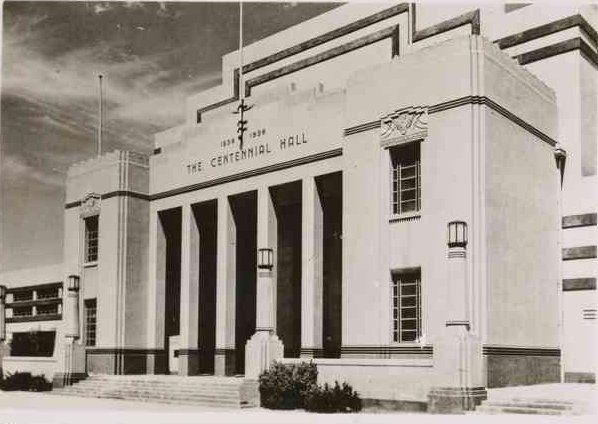
1947

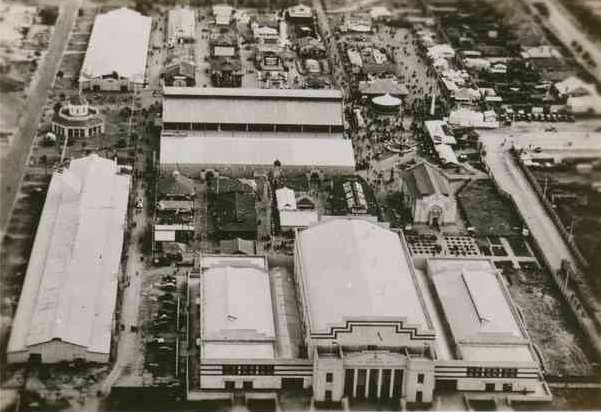
1947

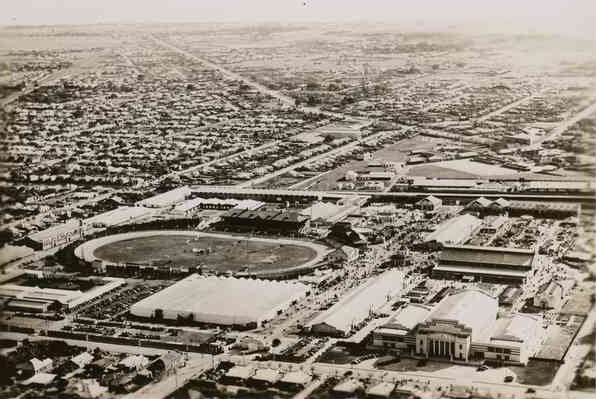
1947

== Comparison ==
Of the five Australian mainland capital city showgrounds main arena's, Wayville and the Brisbane Exhibition Ground are the only ones that still stand largely as they did in their formative years. The Sydney Showground in Moore Park is now Fox Studios Australia, though its main arena is still clearly visible, while the Royal Agricultural Society of New South Wales moved to the Olympic Park site in Homebush in 1998. The Claremont Showground in Perth still stands intact and in use by the Royal Agricultural Society of Western Australia, but the main arena which from 1927 until 2000 housed the Claremont Speedway, has been redeveloped with the speedway no longer in operation. The 586 metres (641 yards) speedway track was removed and while still the main arena of the Showground, is now a fully grassed oval. The Melbourne Showgrounds main arena, which housed a 610 metres (670 yards) harness racing and speedway track, was demolished in 2002 and replaced by a 3,000 seat square main arena which also saw use as the home venue of the Melbourne Aces in the Australian Baseball League from 2010 to 2012.
