= 1988/89 South Australian Individual Speedway Championship =

The 1988/89 South Australian Individual Speedway Championship was the 1988/89 version of the South Australian Individual Speedway Championship organised by the Speedway Riders Association of South Australia and sanctioned by Motorcycling Australia. The final took place on 23 December 1988 at the North Arm Speedway in Adelaide.

The title was won by defending champion Craig Hodgson who finished unbeaten on the night. Four times SA Champion Mark Fiora finished in second, beaten only by Hodgson in heat 19 while Shane Parker defeated Ashley Norton in a run-off for 3rd and 4th place after both had finished on 11 points.

== 1988/89 South Australian Solo Championship ==
- 23 December 1988
- (South Australia) Adelaide, North Arm Speedway
- Referee: Sam Bass
- Qualification: The top two riders go through to the Australian Final at the Motordrome in Newcastle.

Pos.	Rider	Points	Details
Gold	Craig Hodgson	15	(3,3,3,3,3)
Silver	Mark Fiora	14	(3,3,3,3,2)
Bronze	Shane Parker	11+3	(1,2,2,3,3)
4	Ashley Norton	11+2	(0,2,3,3,3)
5	Darrell Branford	9	(1,3,2,0,3)
6	Nigel Greenhalgh	9	(3,1,3,2,Fx)
7	Bill Lellmann	9	(2,2,1,2,2)
8	Scott Norman	9	(2,3,1,2,1)
9	Shane Bowes	7	(2,2,e,1,2)
10	Neil Perry	7	(3,1,0,1,2)
11	Kieran Boyle	6	(0,1,2,2,1)
12	Paul Cooper	4	(2,-,0,1,1)
13	Ray Robertson	3	(0,1,2,0,0)
14	Lee Schooling	3	(1,-,1,1,0)
15	Damon Richardson	2	(1,0,1,-,-)
16	Ross Noble	1	(Fx,0,0,0,1)
17	Dave Marcus (Res)	0	(-,0,-,-,0)
18	Shaun Sampson (Res)	0	(-,-,-,-,0)

=== Classification ===
Placing	Rider	Total	1	2	3	4	5	6	7	8	9	10	11	12	13	14	15	16	17	18	19	20	Pts	Pos
1	(3) Craig Hodgson	15	3						3				3				3				3		15	1
2	(12) Mark Fiora	14			3					3		3			3						2		14	2
3	(9) Shane Parker	11+3			1		2						2					3		3			11	3
4	(11) Ashley Norton	11+2			0				2		3					3						3	11	4
5	(1) Darrell Branford	9	1				3				2				0				3				9	5
6	(7) Nigel Greenhalgh	9		3					1					3	2					fx			9	6
7	(8) Bill Lellmann	9		2						2			1			2			2				9	7
8	(10) Scott Norman	9			2			3						1			2		1				9	8
9	(2) Shane Bowes	7	2					2				e				1				2			7	9
10	(14) Neil Perry	7				3		1					0		1							2	7	10
11	(4) Kieran Boyle	6	0							1				2				2				1	6	11
12	(16) Paul Cooper	4				2				nc	0						1			1			4	12
13	(5) Ray Robertson	3		0			1					2					0					0	3	13
14	(15) Lee Schooling	3				1			ns			1						1	0				3	14
15	(6) Damon Richardson	2		1				0			1							ns			ns		2	15
16	(13) Ross Noble	1				fx	0							0		0					1		1	16
	(17) Dave Marcus	0							0												0		0	
	(18) Shaun Sampson	0																0					0	
Placing	Rider	Total	1	2	3	4	5	6	7	8	9	10	11	12	13	14	15	16	17	18	19	20	Pts	Pos

m - exclusion for exceeding two minute time allowance • t - exclusion for touching the tapes • x - other exclusion • e - retired or mechanical failure • f - fell • ns - non-starter • nc - non-classify

gate A - inside	gate B	gate C	gate D - outside

== See also ==
- Australia national speedway team
- Sport in Australia
