= Shane Parker (speedway rider) =

Australian speedway rider

- Born: 29 April 1970 (age 56); Adelaide, South Australia, Australia
- Nationality: Australian

Career history

Great Britain
- 1990–1994: Ipswich Witches
- 1995–1996: Middlesbrough Bears
- 1997–1998, 2000, 2003: King's Lynn Stars
- 1999: Hull Vikings
- 2000: Belle Vue Aces
- 2001–2003: Peterborough Panthers
- 2004–2009: Glasgow Tigers
- 2010: Somerset Rebels
- 2011: Sheffield Tigers

Poland
- 1992: Machowa
- 1994: Kraków
- 1995–1997: Częstochowa
- 1998: Gniezno
- 1999–2000: Bydgoszcz
- 2001: Grudziądz
- 2010: Ostrów

Sweden
- 1998: Smederna
- 1999–2001: Kaparna
- 2002–2004: Piraterna

Individual honours
- 1983, 1984: South Australian Under-16 Champion
- 1985: Australian Under-16 Champion
- 1991, 1994, 2001, 2002: South Australian Champion
- 1996: Scottish Open Champion
- 2013, 2014: Gillman Div 1 Solo Champion

Team honours
- 1985: Australian Under-16 Pairs Champion
- 1991: Elite League Fours Winner
- 1996, 2000: Polish League Champion
- 1999: European Club Champion
- 2001: Elite League KO Cup Winner
- 2003: Allsvenskan Champion
- 2005, 2006: Premier League Pairs Winner

Shane Andrew Parker (born 29 April 1970 in Adelaide, South Australia) is a former motorcycle speedway rider from Australia and a four time South Australian Champion.

== Career ==
=== Australia ===
Parker attended LeFevre High School in the Adelaide suburb of Semaphore South, and started in speedway at the Under-16 Sidewinders Speedway in Wingfield in the early 1980s. He won the South Australian Under-16 Championships in 1983 and 1984 and went on to win the Australian Under-16 Championship in 1985 at Sidewinders (defeating Leigh Adams), and finish third in 1986 at the Olympic Park Speedway in Mildura, before turning 16 and graduating into the senior ranks. In his home country, Parker has been a successful rider, winning the South Australian Individual Speedway Championship four times (1991, 1994, 2001 and 2002),

Parker made his senior debut at the North Arm Speedway on 4 May 1986 riding an older two valve bike which was all his father could afford to buy. He showed his style by winning his first ever race, only 1.37 seconds outside of Phil Crump's four lap record. Three years later, Parker finished third in the South Australian Championship at North Arm, finishing behind Craig Hodgson who won his fourth championship, and defending champion Mark Fiora, just missing out on a place in the Australian Championship at the Newcastle Motordrome. He defeated Ashley Norton in a runoff to finish in third place in the 1988/89 SA title.

Parker won his first South Australian Championship at the Riverview Speedway in Murray Bridge on 29 December 1990 (counted as the 1991 championship) with a 15-point maximum, finishing four points clear of Damon Richardson and Brett Tomkins. He then went on to finish in ninth place at the Australian Championship in Alice Springs. Finishing with eight points, he was robbed of the chance to finish fourth outright when his engine failed half a lap from home while leading his final heat from eventual fourth placed David Cheshire. Had Parker won and Cheshire finished second, Parker would have finished fourth outright on 11 points, one point clear of the Western Australian.

Following the 1991 Australian title, Parker was suspended from riding on 14 February at an Auto Cycle Union (ACU) of NSW Disciplinary Meeting in Sydney and fined A$1,000 as a result of riding in the Johnnie Hoskins Trophy meeting at the Newcastle Motordrome New Year's Day when it was discovered that he did not have a 1991 FIM racing licence. A maximum ban of two years was rumoured as had he crashed and been injured the insurance covering the meeting would have been invalid. However a solicitor representing him successfully argued that as speedway riding was Parker's main source of income he would be deprived of his chance to earn a living with the longer ban and he was suspended until 1 April instead. Unfortunately for Parker, the ban kept him out of Adelaide's biggest international meeting for the season, the West End Speedway International held at the Wayville Showground which was held just two days after the hearing.

After finishing runner up to Craig Hodgson in the 1992 South Australian Championship at North Arm, Shane Parker produced his best result in the Australian Solo Championship in 1992 when he was runner-up to Mildura rider Leigh Adams at North Arm. Parker was the only rider to defeat Adams on the night when they clashed in Heat 5, his win robbing the 20-year-old Adams of finishing the night with a perfect score from his five rides. Parker would score a total of 13 points, one behind Adams (who won the first of what would be a record ten Australian Championships), and two points clear of Queensland's Mark Carlson who finished third. Parker, who had lost his opening heat to twice former national champion Glenn Doyle, won his next three rides and went into his last ride of the meeting (heat 19) needing to win to finish on 14 points to force a run-off with Adams, but could only finish second behind Queensland rider Tony Langdon.

Parker finished in third place in the 1990 Australian Under-21 Championship behind Leigh Adams and fellow South Australian Shane Bowes at Renmark's Riverland Speedway, and runner up to Adams in the 1991 Australian Under-21 Championship held at the Olympic Park Speedway, the last time he was eligible for the U/21 title. His 1991 U/21 title was hampered by bike problems forcing him to race on a bike borrowed from Australian U/16 Champion Ryan Sullivan. While he rode well, he did not have the outright speed to challenge Adams.

After winning his second SA Championship at North Arm in 1994, Parker failed to place in the Australian Championship Final in Mildura. In 1995, Parker finished 5th in the Australian Championship in Gosford which saw him qualify for the Overseas Final in Coventry, England. At the Overseas Final he finished in eighth place (after winning a runoff with American's Chris Manchester and Charles Ermolenko) to progress to the Intercontinental Final in Norway. There he would again impress by finishing a fine seventh place to just miss a place in the Challenge Round which was qualification to the 1996 Speedway Grand Prix World Championship series.

Parker finished second to Ryan Sullivan in the 1996 SA Championship at North Arm before going on to finish tenth in the 1996 Australian Championship at the Newcastle Showgrounds. He again finished second to Sullivan in the 1997 SA title and went on to finish sixth in the Australian Championship at the Brisbane Exhibition Ground. In the 1998 Aussie title in Murray Bridge, Parker finished in ninth place. His next ride in the Australian Championship came in 2001 at Murray Bridge when he finished 5th to qualify for the Overseas Final in Poole, England where he would finish in 14th place. That year, he had won his third South Australian championship at the new Gillman Speedway (which had replaced North Arm when it closed in 1997), and backed up to win his fourth state title at Gillman in 2002.

=== Great Britain and Europe ===
Parker started riding overseas in 1990 at the age of 20. He raced for Elite League team the Ipswich Witches who he would win the Elite League Fours in 1991. In 1995, he rode for Middlesbrough and was named their team captain. He won the Scottish Open Championship in 1996, was the Elite League KO Cup Winner in 2001 with the Peterborough Panthers.

In 2005, Parker won the Premier League Pairs Championship partnering George Štancl for Glasgow Tigers, during the 2005 Premier League speedway season. He would win it again for Glasgow in 2006, partnering Danny Bird during the 2006 Premier League speedway season.

In Europe, Parker rode for teams in Poland and Sweden. He won the European Speedway Club Champions' Cup as part of Polish team Polonia Bydgoszcz in 1999 and was Swedish Div II Champion with Piraterna in 2003.

=== International ===
After finishing second in the 1992 Australian Solo Championship, Parker went on to finish 11th in the Commonwealth Final at Kings Lynn, England, which saw him qualify for the Overseas Final at the Brandon Stadium in Coventry. The top-nine riders at the meeting would progress on to the Intercontinental Final. Parker finished the Overseas Final in 11th place with seven points from his five rides.

Parker represented Australia in the Speedway World Pairs Championship Final in 1992 held in Lonigo, Italy. Parker, riding as backup to Craig Boyce and Leigh Adams scored 1 point in one ride as Australia finished in 7th and last place.

Parker finished in fifth place in the 1990 Under-21 World Championship in Lviv, Russia, and improved to fourth place in 1991 in Coventry. Parker also represented Australia in various "Test Matches" against visiting overseas teams or all-star lineups during the Australian domestic seasons which generally runs from October to March, as well as test matches in England and Europe.

== Return to Australia ==
In October 2010, Parker confirmed that 2011 would be his last season riding in the British leagues before he moved back to Adelaide with his family and would race full-time at Adelaide's Gillman Speedway. Parker also confirmed his intentions to race in the 2012 Australian Solo Championship, though he eventually did not participate, only competing in the South Australian Championship where he finished second to reigning Australian champion Troy Batchelor. The 2012 SA title at Gillman was the first time he had contested the championship since finishing runner up in 2004 behind Rory Schlein.

Parker completed a successful return home to Adelaide for 2012-13 when he won the Gillman Speedway Division 1 Solo Championship on 2 February 2013. Only beaten in his first ride of the night, veteran Parker, still a favourite of the Adelaide crowd after some 27 years of senior racing, showed the younger riders the way around the 300 metres (330 yd) long track, top scoring in the heats, and after grabbing the lead from the start, easily won the four lap final from local rider Robert Branford, with newly crowned Australian Under-21 champion, 16-year-old Max Fricke finishing third, and Justin Sedgemen from Mildura finishing fourth. Parker backed this up by winning the 2014 Gillman Championship from Victorian riders Justin Sedgemen and Max Fricke.

While still racing in the 2013-14 season, Parker also finds himself back where he began at the Sidewinders Speedway helping with junior rider development. He also conducts junior coaching clinics at other speedways around Australia, including Gillman and the Pinjar Park Speedway located near the Barbagallo Raceway north of Perth.

Parker retired from riding in 2014.

== World Final Appearances ==
=== World Pairs Championship ===
- 1992 - (Italy) Lonigo, Pista Speedway (with Craig Boyce / Leigh Adams) - 7th - 10pts (1)

=== Individual Under-21 World Championship ===
- 1990 - (Soviet Union) Lviv, Stadium Ska - 5th - 9pts
- 1991 - (United Kingdom) Coventry, Brandon Stadium - 4th - 10pts
