= 1986 Australian Individual Speedway Championship =

Australian motorcycle speedway championship

The 1986 Australian Individual Speedway Championship was held at the Pioneer Park Speedway in Ayr, Queensland on 11 January. Eighteen-year-old Brisbane based rider Troy Butler surprised by winning his first (and only) Australian Championship and in doing so becoming the youngest winner in the history of the Australian Championship since it was first run in 1926. The top four placed riders were all from Queensland with he first non-Queenslander being fifth placed South Australian Steve Baker who lost a runoff for fourth place to Steve Regeling. Baker and Regeling were the only riders to defeat Butler on the day.

In the absence of six time and reigning champion Billy Sanders who had died in England in April 1985, Victoria's three time national champion Phil Crump was the favourite to take out his fourth title. However, after winning his first race, Crump suffered engine failure in his next two rides to put him well out of contention. He won his fourth ride but again suffered engine drama in his last race to eventually finish 12th with just 6 points.

== 1986 Australian Solo Championship ==
- Australian Championship
- 11 January 1986
- Ayr, Queensland - Pioneer Park Speedway
- Referee:
- Qualification: The top four riders go through to the Commonwealth Final in Manchester, England.

Pos.	Rider	Points	Details
Gold	Troy Butler ( (Queensland) )	13	(2,3,3,3,2)
Silver	John Titman ( (Queensland) )	12	(3,2,3,3,1)
Bronze	Alan Rivett ( (Queensland) )	11	(3,3,2,2,1)
4	Steve Regeling ( (Queensland) )	10	(2,3,2,E,3+3)
5	Steve Baker ( (South Australia) )	10	(3,0,3,2,2+2)
6	David Jackson ( (Northern Territory) )	9	(0,2,3,2,1)
7	Chris Watson ( (New South Wales) )	8	(1,3,1,2,1)
8	Stephen Davies ( (New South Wales) )	8	(2,1,1,1,3)
9	John McNeill ( (Victoria (state)) )	8	(2,1,1,2,2)
10	Glyn Taylor ( (Western Australia) )	7	(0,3,2,2,0)
11	Mark Fiora ( (South Australia) )	7	(1,1,0,3,2)
12	Phil Crump ( (Victoria (state)) )	6	(3,E,E,3,E)
13	Dave Cheshire ( (Western Australia) )	4	(1,2,1,0,0)
14	Brent Nott ( (Northern Territory) )	3	(1,0,0,1,1)
15	Ray Palmer ( (Queensland) )	2	(0,E,1,0,0)
16	Dale Watson ( (New South Wales) )	1	(0,1,F,F,0)
17	Peter Chrisopher ( (Queensland) ) (Res)	1	(-,-,-,1,-)
18	Craig Dennan ( (Queensland) ) (Res)	0	(Did not ride)

=== Classification ===
Placing	Rider	Total	1	2	3	4	5	6	7	8	9	10	11	12	13	14	15	16	17	18	19	20	Pts	Pos	21	22
1	(Queensland) (6) Troy Butler	13		2				3			3							3			2		13	1		
2	(Queensland) (2) John Titman	12	3					2				3				3				1			12	2		
3	(Queensland) (13) Alan Rivett	11				3	3							2		2					1		11	3		
4	(Queensland) (12) Steve Regeling	10			2					3		2			E						3		10	4	3	
5	(South Australia) (7) Steve Baker	10		3					0					3	2					2			10	5	2	
6	(Northern Territory) (11) David Jackson	9			1				2		2					1						3	9	6		
7	(New South Wales) (9) Chris Watson	8			0		2						3					2		1			8	7		
8	(New South Wales) (1) Stephen Davies	8	2				1				1				1				3				8	8		
9	(Victoria (state)) (15) John McNeill	8				2			1			1						2	2				8	9		
10	(Western Australia) (3) Glyn Taylor	7	0						3				2				2				0		7	10		
11	(South Australia) (14) Mark Fiora	7				1		1					0		3							2	7	11		
12	(Victoria (state)) (10) Phil Crump	6			3			E						E			3		E				6	12		
13	(Western Australia) (4) Dave Cheshire	4	1							2				1				0				0	4	13		
14	(Northern Territory) (5) Brent Nott	3		1			0					0					1					1	3	14		
15	(Queensland) (8) Ray Palmer	1		0						E			1			0			0				1	15		
16	(New South Wales) (16) Dale Watson	1				0				1	F						F			0			1	16		
R1	(Queensland) (R1) Peter Chrisopher	1																	1				1	R1		
R2	(Queensland) (R2) Craig Dennan	0																					0	R2		
Placing	Rider	Total	1	2	3	4	5	6	7	8	9	10	11	12	13	14	15	16	17	18	19	20	Pts	Pos	21	22

m - exclusion for exceeding two minute time allowance • t - exclusion for touching the tapes • x - other exclusion • e - retired or mechanical failure • f - fell • ns - non-starter • nc - non-classify

gate A - inside	gate B	gate C	gate D - outside

== See also ==
- Australia national speedway team
- Sport in Australia
- Motorcycle Speedway
