= 1990/91 South Australian Individual Speedway Championship =

The 1990/91 South Australian Individual Speedway Championship was the 45th running of the South Australian Individual Speedway Championship organised by the Speedway Riders Association of South Australia and sanctioned by Motorcycling Australia. The final took place on 29 December 1990 at the 300 metres (330 yd) long Riverview Speedway in Murray Bridge.

Shane Parker scored a virtually unchallenged 15 point maximum to claim his first South Australian Championship. Damon Richardson finished second on 11 points after defeating Brett Tomkins in a runoff after Tomkins also scored 11 points. Defending champion Scott Norman was hampered by bike troubles on the night and never posed a threat to Parker.

Shane Bowes, who was one of the favorites to take out the title after breaking the 4 and 6 lap records at Riverview earlier in the month (after having done the same the previous night at North Arm in Adelaide), was unable to ride in the meeting due to lodging his nomination form one day too late. Organizers considered letting him ride in the state championship, but some of his fellow riders (perhaps mindful of his career best form) insisted that rules were rules and Bowes should be kept out. Bowes and Scott Norman would later get their chance to qualify for the Australian Championship in Alice Springs when they finished 1st and 2nd respectively a special last chance qualifying round arranged due to the large number of leading riders (mostly from New South Wales and Queensland) who had failed to qualify through the various state championships.

== 1990/91 South Australian Solo Championship ==
- 29 December 1990
- (South Australia) Murray Bridge, Riverview Speedway
- Referee: Gavin Willson
- Qualification: The top two riders go through to the Australian Final at the Arunga Park Speedway in Alice Springs.

Pos.	Rider	Points	Details
1	Shane Parker	15	
2	Damon Richardson	11+3	
3	Brett Tomkins	11+2	
4	Neil Perry	10+3	
5	Neil Hardy	10+3	
6	Darrell Branford	9	
7	Steve Graetz	8	
8	Ross Noble	8	
9	Scott Norman	7	
10	Barry Golding	7	
11	Troy Norvill	6	
12	Gary Fischer	6	
13	Paul Cooper	5	
14	Mark Mitchell	3	
15	Matthew Anchor	3	
16	Ivan Clothier (Res)	1	
17	Shaun Sampson	0	

== See also ==
- Australia national speedway team
- Sport in Australia
