= North Arm Speedway =

Motorcycle speedway in Gillman, Australia

The Place Where Champions Now Gather
- Location: Grand Trunkway, Gillman, South Australia 5013
- Coordinates: 34°49′25″S 138°31′21″E
- Capacity: 5,000
- Owner: Government of South Australia
- Operator: Speedway Riders' Association of South Australia Inc.
- Opened: 26 July 1981
- Closed: 1997
- Major events: Australian Solo Championship; Australian Under-21 Solo Championship; South Australian Solo Championship; South Australian Sidecar Championship; Jack Young Memorial Cup; Kevin O'Connell Memorial; Harry Denton Memorial Shield

Speedway
- Surface: Dolomite and shale
- Length: 0.173 miles (0.280 km)

North Arm Speedway was the first dedicated motorcycle speedway ever built in Adelaide, South Australia and was located in the industrial suburb of Gillman. It was run by the Speedway Riders' Association of South Australia and ran from 1981 until its forced closure in 1997.

== History ==
=== Early years ===
North Arm Speedway was South Australia's first dedicated senior Solo and Sidecar track. Previous tracks (other than the Wayville Showgrounds in the late 1920s and early 1930s which ran before car speedway became popular) in both Adelaide and around the state had generally catered to both bikes and cars.

The speedway was opened on Sunday 26 July 1981, by the Speedway Riders' Association on land owned by the South Australian Government. Following the closure of Rowley Park Speedway in April 1979, the only Dirt track racing venue in Adelaide was the new Speedway Park, which has a clay surface, something that suited the increasingly popular car racing, but not motorcycle speedway. Despite the bikes racing in the early years at Speedway Park, the nearest speedway to Adelaide which suited bike racing was some 80 km away at the Riverview Speedway in Murray Bridge, which during the speedway season (generally October to April) only ran meetings every second Saturday night. With many of South Australia's riders based in Adelaide, the decision was made to build a motorcycle only venue in Adelaide with a Dolomite surface where weekly meetings could be run.

The track itself was approximately 280 metres (310 yards) in length, which while considered small by Australian track standards (when it was built, most Aussie speedways were usually 350-550m in length as most run cars as well as bikes with Speedway Park itself being 430 metres (470 yards) long), it was roughly the same length as most tracks in Britain where most of the top riders rode professionally. The safety fence was a 2m high chain mesh fence on top of a 1 ft high wooden retaining fence. Lights were eventually installed for night meetings in 1985, although spectator capacity was only around 5,000 (more with extra seating for Australian Championship meetings).

Due to North Arm's relatively small spectator capacity, and its lack of lights for night racing, both the Australian Sidecar Championship and the Australian Solo Championship were awarded to Speedway Park with its capacity to comfortably hold over 10,000 spectators in both 1982 and 1983 respectively.

=== Move to Friday Nights ===
When it first opened North Arm Speedway held regular Sunday afternoon meetings so as not to compete with Speedway Park which ran Friday nights and had the bikes on the program, and also to avoid clashing with meetings at the Riverview Speedway. South Australian riders would regularly race three days per week at home, something most experienced when racing in the British Leagues during the Australian winter months.

After the 1984/85 season, bikes were off the program at Speedway Park following safety concerns after the death of rider Kevin O'Connell on 25 January 1985. O'Connell had been killed after he hit the speedway's concrete retaining wall which offered no protection to riders or passengers. With the bikes no longer competing at Speedway Park, lights were installed at North Arm in 1985 and the speedway began holding regular Friday night meetings from 1985/86 which lasted until the speedway's closure. During the winter of 1986 the pits at North Arm were also re-located. Originally they were outside the back straight but were moved to outside of the front straight behind the control tower (which also incorporated the announcers box). The old pits became car parking while Turn 3 for the solo's (Turn 2 for the sidecars) became known as the Old Pits Corner.

=== Championships and International Meetings ===
From 1983 until it closed in 1997 North Arm became the regular host of the South Australian Solo and Sidecar championships, hosting the Solo title 10 times. The only other tracks to host the SA Solo title during this period were the Westline Speedway in Whyalla (1986/87) and Riverview Speedway (1984/85, 1987/88, 1990/91).

North Arm hosted the 1992 Australian Solo Championship, where a capacity crowd of over 6,000 fans saw Leigh Adams from Victoria win the first of a record 10 national championships (a temporary grandstand was erected on the outside of turn 1 for the expected attendance). Adams set a track record in the 2nd heat of the night with a time of 58.74 seconds for the 4 lap race. The record he broke had been set in Heat 1 of the championship by reigning South Aussie Champ Craig Hodgson who won in a time of 59.11 seconds. Leigh Adams won with 14 points from North Arm's own Shane Parker on 13 and Queensland's Mark Carlson third on 11 points. This meeting also saw the crash which almost ended the career of Australia's former World #3 from 1990, Todd Wiltshire who suffered a multiple back injuries and broken pelvis which force him to retire at age 23 though he did make a successful comeback in 1997. Wiltshire, battling with Jason Lyons for the lead going into the last turn of Heat 3, tried a pass on the outside and went down, sliding into the wooden safety fence which broke around a light pole (placed outside the fence) on impact in the old pit corner.

Unfortunately during its 16-year life span, North Arm was never awarded the right to host the Australian Sidecar Championship, although it did host some of Australia's richest Sidecar meetings.

North Arm Speedway's spectator capacity was pushed to the limit on a number of occasions including test Matches between Australia with riders such as Phil Crump, Todd Wiltshire, Leigh Adams and local riders Shane Parker, Scott Norman and Shane Bowes taking on visiting 'teams' such as a "Rest of the World" team in 1990 including Gary Havelock of England, Mitch Shirra of New Zealand, and Shawn Moran of the United States (while the injured Sam Ermolenko was guest commentator on the night). In 1991 Australia faced a powerful Swedish team led by 1990 World Champion Per Jonsson, former dual Ice Racing World Champion Erik Stenlund, as well as 1990 World finalists Jimmy Nilsen and Henrik Gustafsson and 1988 World Under-21 Champion Peter Nahlin (who was the Swedish reserve on the night). The Swede's also had in their riding lineup a young rider who was not only the reigning Swedish Champion, but the rider would go on equal Ivan Mauger's six Speedway World Championships, the great Tony Rickardsson. Both the 1990 and 1991 test matches attracted 4,000 and 4,800 fans respectively, well up on previous crowd figures for the speedway. It was the success of those two international meetings which led to the speedway being awarded the 1992 Australian Solo Championship.

The 1990/91 season also saw the first, and so far only tour of Australia by the official USSR team, who while not facing Australia in a test, faced state teams and various other 'select' teams while on tour. They faced a South Australian Select team in their visit to North Arm on 28 December 1990 with the locals, strengthened by 'ring-ins' Dennis Löfqvist from Sweden and David Norris from England (resident North Arm international riders) defeating the Russians 53–37 in a match closer than the score suggests. Actual local riders Shane Bowes (team captain) and Shane Parker top scored for the 'SA' with 13 and 8 points respectively while Oleg Kurguskin with 11 and the late Rif Saitgareev with 10 points top scored for the Russians.

During its lifetime North Arm was also the Australian base for various international riders racing in the Australian Speedway season with riders such as Shawn Moran (USA), Vesa Ylinen of Finland, Dennis Löfqvist from Sweden and David Norris from England all basing themselves in Adelaide. North Arm was also the Australian base for two future Speedway World Champions. Twenty-year-old Gary Havelock from England (the 1992 World Champion) spent the 1987/88 Australian season based at North Arm, while 2010 World Champion Tomasz Gollob from Poland (along with his brother Jacek who made a number of appearances), made North Arm his Aussie home during 1994/95.

While North Arm had its fair share of accidents, sometimes resulting in serious injury, no competitor was ever killed at the speedway or later as the result of a crash.

== Closing ==
Following the 1996/97 Australian Speedway season (generally run between October and April), North Arm Speedway was closed when the South Australian Government reclaimed the land that the speedway was located on. This left Adelaide without an operating motorcycle speedway for the first time since 1926 when racing was first held at the Wayville Showground. Most of North Arm's track surface was then moved less than 2 km away to the new Gillman Speedway to form the base of a 213 metres (233 yards) track that was used for daytime practice meetings until a larger 400 metres (440 yards) track was built for race meetings before the current 300 metres (330 yards) track was opened in 2000.

Even though Friday night meetings at the track were held in summer, North Arm could actually be cold when the wind was blowing from the north or west (the track was located close to the marshlands and adjacent to the Port River and the Gulf St Vincent). The speedway also had spectator facilities which could be described average at best. Despite this, North Arm Speedway is fondly remembered by those who either rode there or were regular spectators.

== Present Day ==
Today the site of North Arm Speedway shows nothing of its past as a speedway as industrial buildings now occupy the land. The last remnants of the speedway were removed in mid-2004 when what was left of the track itself was cleared and building starting in mid-2005. When looking on Google Earth at historic photos the start/finish line of the speedway was on the Grand Trunkway (road) side of the track, with the pit area located between the front straight and the road. Car parking for the speedway was in the area to the north of the track.

== Australian Championships ==
=== Australian Solo Championship ===
- 1992 – (Victoria (state)) Leigh Adams – 14pts

=== Australian Under-21 Championship ===
- 1988 – (Victoria (state)) Leigh Adams
- 1996 – (South Australia) Ryan Sullivan

== Competitors ==
Some of the competitors who raced at North Arm Speedway between 1981 and 1997 were:

- Leigh Adams ( (Australia) ) (Solo)♦
- John Boulger ( (Australia) ) (Solo)♦
- Shane Bowes ( (Australia) ) (Solo)
- Craig Boyce ( (Australia) ) (Solo)♦
- Tony Boyle ( (Australia) ) (Solo) †
- Darryl Branford ( (Australia) ) (Solo)
- Troy Butler ( (Australia) ) (Solo)♦
- Phil Collins ( (England) ) (Solo)
- Jason Crump ( (Australia) ) (Solo)♦**
- Phil Crump ( (Australia) ) (Solo)♦
- Stephen Davies ( (Australia) ) (Solo)
- Jeremy Doncaster ( (England) ) (Solo)
- Glenn Doyle ( (Australia) ) (Solo)♦
- Sam Ermolenko ( (United States) ) (Solo)**
- Mark Fiora ( (Australia) ) (Solo)
- Viktor Gajdym ( (Soviet Union) ) (Solo)
- Tomasz Gollob ( (Poland) ) (Solo)**
- Henrik Gustafsson ( (Sweden) ) (Solo)
- Gary Havelock ( (England) ) (Solo)**
- Craig Hodgson ( (Australia) ) (Solo) †
- Rod Hunter ( (Australia) ) (Solo)
- Conny Iversson ( (Sweden) ) (Solo)
- Per Jonsson ( (Sweden) ) (Solo)**
- Oleg Kurguskin ( (Soviet Union) ) (Solo)
- Dennis Löfqvist ( (Sweden) ) (Solo)
- Mark Loram ( (England) ) (Solo)**
- Jason Lyons ( (Australia) ) (Solo)
- Rinat Mardanshin ( (Soviet Union) ) (Solo) †
- Rick Miller ( (United States) ) (Solo)
- Shawn Moran ( (United States) ) (Solo)
- Peter Nahlin ( (Sweden) ) (Solo)
- Jimmy Nilsen ( (Sweden) ) (Solo)
- Scott Norman ( (Australia) ) (Solo)
- David Norris ( (England) ) (Solo)
- Shane Parker ( (Australia) ) (Solo)
- Steve Regeling ( (Australia) ) (Solo)♦
- Tony Rickardsson ( (Sweden) ) (Solo)**
- Rif Saitgareev ( (Soviet Union) ) (Solo) †
- Billy Sanders ( (Australia) ) (Solo)♦ †
- Steve Schofield ( (England) ) (Solo)
- Mitch Shirra ( (New Zealand) ) (Solo)
- Andrew Silver ( (England) ) (Solo)
- Erik Stenlund ( (Sweden) ) (Solo)
- Ryan Sullivan ( (Australia) ) (Solo)♦
- Todd Wiltshire ( (Australia) ) (Solo)♦
- Vesa Ylinen ( (Finland) ) (Solo)
- Brian Bascombe ( (Australia) ) (Sidecar (passenger)
- Greg Black ( (Australia) ) (Sidecar (passenger)
- Andrew Cleave ( (Australia) ) (Sidecar)♦
- Peter Fleet ( (Australia) ) (Sidecar)
- Rob Hardy ( (Australia) ) (Sidecar (passenger)
- Martien Hurkmans ( (Australia) ) (Sidecar)
- Nipper Crabb ( (Australia) ) (Sidercar)
- Jim Irwin ( (Australia) ) (Sidecar)
- Gary Moon ( (Australia) ) (Sidecar)♦ †
- Neil Munro ( (Australia) ) (Sidecar)♦
- Dennis Nash ( (Australia) ) (Sidecar)♦
- Chris Rae ( (Australia) ) (Sidecar)
- Darren Power ( (Australia) ) (Sidecar (passenger)
- Brian Schultz ( (Australia) ) (Sidecar) †
- Bob Slater ( (Australia) ) (Sidecar (passenger)
- Shane Souter ( (Australia) ) (Sidecar)♦
- Darrin Treloar ( (Australia) ) (Sidecar)♦
- Shane Wade ( (Australia) ) (Sidecar (passenger)

** Speedway World Champion
♦ Australian Solo or Sidecar Champion
† – Deceaced
