= Neil Perry (disambiguation) =

Neil Perry is an Australian chef.

Neil Perry may also refer to:

== Sports ==
- Neil Perry (cricketer) (born 1958), former English cricketer
- Neil Perry (speedway rider) in 1988/89 South Australian Individual Speedway Championship

== Music ==
- Neil Perry (band), the screamo band
- Neil Perry from The Band Perry

== Fiction ==
- Neil Perry (Dexter), fictional character in Dexter
- Neil Perry (Dead Poets Society), fictional character in Dead Poets Society
- Neil Perry (The Time Machine), fictional character in The Time Machine (1978 film)
