= Rusty Harrison =

Australian speedway rider

- Born: 11 October 1981 (age 45); Elizabeth, South Australia
- Nationality: Australian

Career history
- 2000, 2009, 2014: Glasgow Tigers
- 2001–2004, 2006, 2010–2013: Workington Comets
- 2005–2006: Edinburgh Monarchs
- 2005: Belle Vue Aces
- 2007: Stoke Potters
- 2008: King's Lynn Stars
- 2009: Birmingham Brummies

Individual honours
- 1995, 1997: Australian Under-16 Champion
- 2001: Australian Under-21 Champion
- 2003: South Australian Champion

Team honours
- 2001, 2006: Premier League Fours Champion

Russell Wade Harrison (born 11 October 1981 in Elizabeth, South Australia) is an Australian former motorcycle speedway rider.

== Career summary ==
Harrison won the Australian Under-16 Championship in 1995 in Perth and again in 1997 at his home track in Adelaide (Sidewinders Speedway), before going on to be the Australian Under-21 Champion in 2001, winning again at home in Adelaide, this time at the Gillman Speedway. In 2002 he was third in the Australian Under-21 Championship at Gillman behind winner Travis McGowan and second placed Cameron Woodward. Harrison also won the South Australian Championship in 2003 Gillman. As of 2015, Harrison's 2003 win was the last time a South Australian born rider has won the SA Championship (Adelaide based, but Darwin born Rory Schlein would win the title from 2004-2007).

Harrison made his debut in British speedway in 2001 riding for Glasgow Tigers. In 2001 he joined Workington Comets where he stayed for three seasons, before moving to Edinburgh Monarchs in 2005. In 2005, he also rode as a reserve for Belle Vue Aces in the Elite League at number seven.

Harrison moved back to Workington in 2006, after apparently refusing to take his last two rides for Edinburgh during rain soaked meeting against Rye House Rockets on 7 July 2006, He was part of the Workington four who won the Premier League Four-Team Championship, held on 7 October 2006, at Derwent Park.

Harrison rode for Stoke Potters in 2007. In September 2007, Harrison decided to retire from speedway after being affected by the serious injuries suffered by team-mate Garry Stead. This followed a poor run of form when he had already decided to stop riding that season, saying, "I just haven't got going at all and I feel I have been letting too many people down" said the Australian. You are a danger to yourself and others when your head is not right and it's best that I stand down now before anything else happens."

However, in early 2008 the King's Lynn Stars signed Harrison for the 2008 season. He rode for Glasgow Tigers and Birmingham Brummies in 2009, and rode for Workington Comets between 2010 and 2012. He quit the Comets in June 2012 due to family and work commitments, but towards the end of 2012 signed for the Comets again to ride in 2013.

Harrison's last season was in 2015 for Workington.
