= Bob Leverenz =

Australian speedway rider

- Born: 6 February 1925; Findon, South Australia
- Died: 16 March 2009 (aged 84)
- Nationality: Australian

Career history
- 1949-1952: Norwich Stars

Individual honours
- 1950, 1951, 1952, 1953: South Australian Champion
- 1950 (4): Adelaide Golden Helmet

Team honours
- 1950, 1951: National League Division II
- 1951: National Trophy (Div 2)
- 1951: Southern Shield

Robert Leverenz (6 February 1925 – 16 March 2009) was an Australian international speedway rider, who featured in the 1951 Speedway World Championship final alongside the winner and fellow Adelaide rider Jack Young.

== Career ==
Leverenz was born on 6 February 1925 in Findon, South Australia. He spent his entire United Kingdom career with the Norwich Stars, first riding for them during the 1949 season. He was a member of the team that won the National League Division Two championships in 1950 and 1951.

Leverenz's career highlights included winning four South Australian Championships: 1950 at Kilburn Speedway, 1951, 1952 and 1953, at Rowley Park Speedway. He also won four Adelaide Golden Helmet's in 1950. Three wins came at Kilburn and the final win came at Rowley Park.

In 1951, Leverenz captained the Australian Test Team against England at Kilburn Speedway in 1951. The same year he won the Harringay Trophy at Harringay Stadium and the Festival of Britain, Gold Star, at New Cross Stadium, London, on 2 May 1951.

His league averages for Norwich were:

- 1949: Division 2: 6.97 points
- 1950: Division 2: 8.25 points
- 1951: Division 2: 10.07 points
- 1952: Division 1: 10.00 points

== World Final appearances ==
- 1951 - (England) London, Wembley Stadium - 8th - 7pts
