= 1990 Speedway Under-21 World Championship =

European motorcycle speedway event

World Under-21 Championship
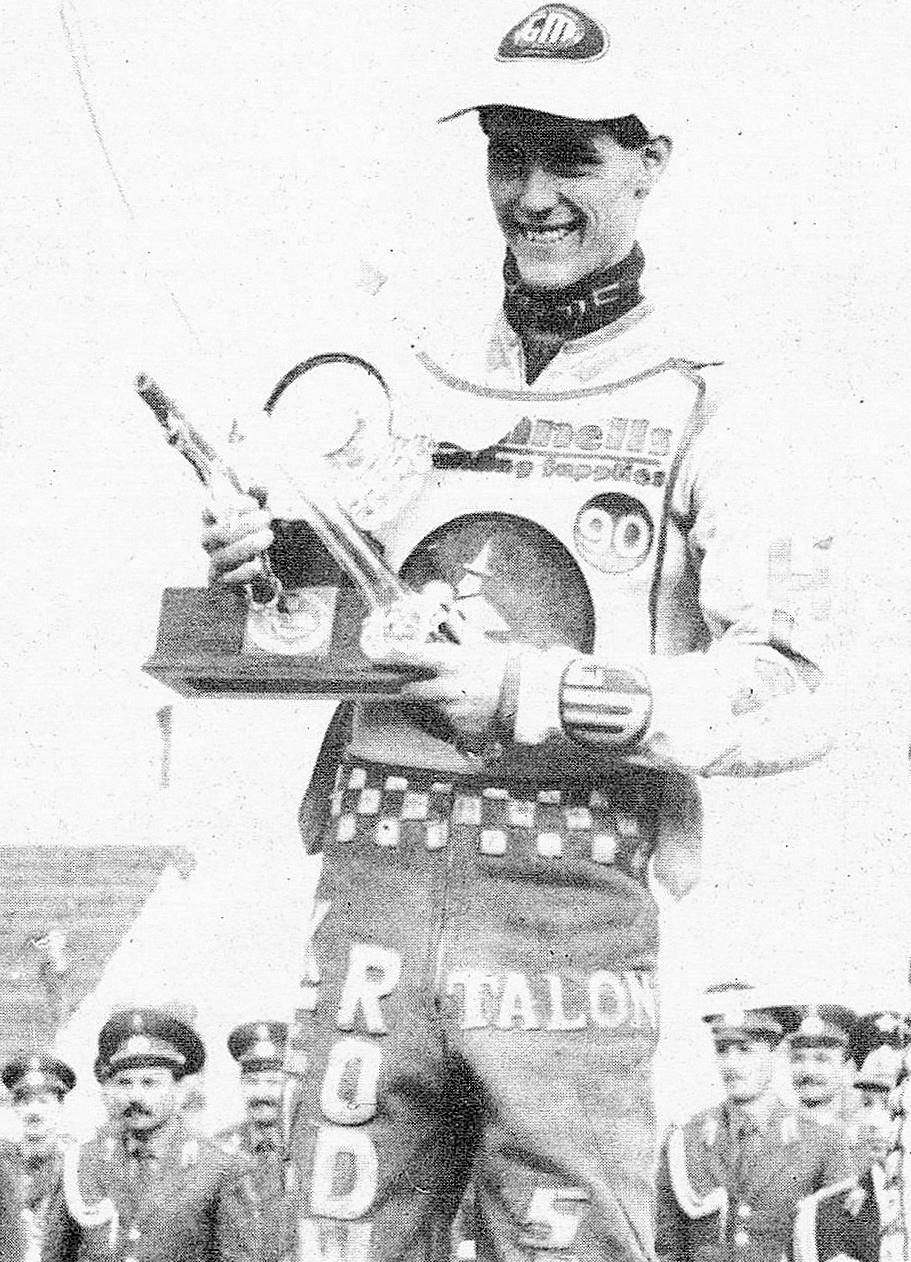
- Chris Louis receiving the trophy after winning the 1990 Championship
- Venue: Stadium Ska
- Location: Lviv, Soviet Union
- Start date: 9 September 1990

The 1990 Individual Speedway Junior World Championship was the 14th edition of the World motorcycle speedway Under-21 Championships.

The championship was won by Chris Louis of England.

== World final ==
- 9 September 1990
- (Soviet Union) Stadium Ska, Lviv

Placing	Rider	Total	1	2	3	4	5	6	7	8	9	10	11	12	13	14	15	16	17	18	19	20	Pts	Pos	21
1	(England) (4) Chris Louis	14	3							3				3				2				3	14	1	
2	(Soviet Union) (15) Rene Aas	13				2			3			2						3	3				13	2	
3	(Sweden) (16) Tony Rickardsson	10				1				0	3						3			3			10	3	3
4	(Poland) (11) Jarosław Olszewski	10			2				2		1					3						2	10	4	2
5	(Australia) (5) Shane Parker	9		2			2					3					1					1	9	5	
6	(Norway) (8) Lars Gunnestad	9		1						2			2			2			2				9	6	
7	(Denmark) (10) Brian Andersen	8			3			3						2			0		0				8	7	
8	(Australia) (6) Shane Bowes	7		0				2			2							F			3		7	8	
9	(Poland) (13) Jarosław Szymkowiak	6				E	3							1		0					2		6	9	
10	(England) (7) Dean Standing	6		3					1					F	1					1			6	10	
11	(Italy) (1) Massimo Mora	6	2				1				E				2				1				6	11	
12	(Poland) (14) Dariusz Śledź	5				3		1					1		E							0	5	12	
13	(Hungary) (12) Zsolt Böszermenyi	5			E					1		1			3						X		5	13	
14	(Bulgaria) (2) Georgi Petranov	4	1					F				0				1				2			4	14	
15	(Hungary) (9) Atilla Kovacs	1			1		F						0					F		F			1	15	
16	(Sweden) (3) Peter Karlsson	0	E						X				-				-				-		0	16	
R1	(Soviet Union) (R1) Andrei Korolev	3											3								F		3	R1	
R2	(Soviet Union) (R2) Viktor Gaidym	2															2						2	R2	
Placing	Rider	Total	1	2	3	4	5	6	7	8	9	10	11	12	13	14	15	16	17	18	19	20	Pts	Pos	21

m - exclusion for exceeding two minute time allowance • t - exclusion for touching the tapes • x - other exclusion • e - retired or mechanical failure • f - fell • ns - non-starter • nc - non-classify

gate A - inside	gate B	gate C	gate D - outside
