= Rene Aas =

Estonian motorcycle racer (born 1969)

- Born: August 13, 1969 (age 57); Tallinn, then part of Estonian SSR, Soviet Union
- Nationality: Estonian

Career history

Estonia
- 1990: AMK Ranna
- 1992: AMK Ramo

Great Britain
- 1993, 1995–1998: Sheffield Tigers
- 1996: Bradford Dukes
- 1999: Stoke Potters
- 2000: Hull Vikings
- 2001: Edinburgh Monarchs

Individual honours
- 1990: World U21 Championship silver

Rene Aas (born 13 August 1969) is an Estonian former motorcycle speedway rider who raced in British Speedway leagues from 1993 to 2001 and represented the Soviet Union at international level in the 1980s.

== Career ==
Aas was born in Tallinn, Estonia, during the Soviet occupation. Aas began racing motorcycles in 1981, racing for the Ranna Sovkhoz motorsport club. In 1986, he finished in third place during the Soviet Union's hippodrome ride championships in the 250 cc class. He won the Soviet Championships in hippodrome ride in 1990 in the 500cc class. He also won five Estonian titles in speedway and hippodrome rides. He raced for Ranna AMK and Ramo AMK after Estonia regained independence.

In 1993, Aas first raced for British teams and was the first Estonian speedway rider to ride in Britain.

Aas raced for Sheffield Tigers, with loan spells at other clubs. Demotivated and feeling as an "homeless" outsider in the United Kingdom, Aas ended his career in 2002.

=== International ===
Aas earned five caps for the Soviet Union. He won silver medal at the 1990 Speedway Under-21 World Championship. In 1989, he reached the finals of the Speedway Under-21 World Championship and the following year won silver medal at the 1990 Speedway Under-21 World Championship.
