= Mark Fiora =

Australian speedway rider

- Born: 16 May 1962 (age 64); Mount Barker, South Australia
- Nickname: Felix
- Nationality: Australian

Career history
- 1981: Scunthorpe Stags
- 1981-1982: Sheffield Tigers
- 1982-1984: Edinburgh Monarchs
- 1983: Leicester Lions
- 1984: Newcastle Diamonds
- 1984: Wolverhampton Wolves
- 1985, 1987-1988: Middlesbrough Tigers
- 1985: Reading Racers
- 1986: Long Eaton Invaders
- 1987-1988: Bradford Dukes
- 1988: Cradley Heathens
- 1988: Ipswich Witches

Individual honours
- 1983, 1984, 1985, 1987: South Australian Champion

Team honours
- 1988: Australian Pairs Champion
- 1985: Fours Championship winner

Mark Fiora (born 16 May 1962 in Mount Barker, South Australia) is a former Australian international motorcycle speedway rider. He is a four time South Australian Champion, and winner of the Australian Best Pairs championship in 1988 with Craig Hodgson. Fiora also rode for 13 different teams in the United Kingdom between 1981 and 1988.

== Career ==
=== Australia ===
"Felix" Fiora, as he was known, was one of the earliest graduates of Adelaide's Under-16 Sidewinders Speedway and started his senior racing career on South Australia's speedway's Rowley Park (Adelaide) and Riverview (Murray Bridge) and was seen by many as a possible successor to John Boulger as South Australia's best rider.

Fiora impressed in his early years and his experience in the UK during 1981 and 1982 finally saw his potential tapped when he won the 1983 South Australian Championship at Speedway Park. He made it two in a row in 1984 at the North Arm Speedway in Adelaide and made it a hat trick of state title wins when he won again in 1985 at the Riverview Speedway. After finishing second to former World (European) Under-21 Champion Steve Baker in 1986, Fiora made it four wins in five years when he won his last SA title in 1987 at the Westline Speedway in Whyalla. Fiora would finish second to Craig Hodgson in 1988 and he finished second again the Hodgson in 1989 at North Arm.

As South Australian Champion or runner-up, Fiora gained automatic qualification to the Australian Championship, with his best result being fourth in 1988 when the title was held in Murray Bridge. Mark Fiora's best result at the Australian Best Pairs Championship was winning the title in 1988 at Murray Bridge with Craig Hodgson.

Following the 1989/90 season, Fiora at the age of 28, retired from competitive riding. At the 1992 Australian Championship held at North Arm, Fiora took part in demonstration rides throughout the night against other former South Australian riders, including twice national and nine time SA champion John Boulger. Fiora 'won' each of his four rides.

Fiora holds the record for most wins in the South Australian Championship at different tracks, with each of his four title wins coming at different tracks (Speedway Park, North Arm, Riverview and Westline).

=== United Kingdom ===
Fiora first raced in the British leagues in 1981 and he rode for 13 different sides until retiring from riding in Great Britain after 1988. During his time in the UK, Mark Fiora rode for the Scunthorpe Stags, Sheffield Tigers, Edinburgh Monarchs, Leicester Lions, Birmingham Brummies, Newcastle Diamonds, Wolverhampton Wolves, Middlesbrough Bears, Reading Racers, Long Eaton Invaders, Bradford Dukes, Cradley Heathens and finally, the Ipswich Witches.

In 1985, Fiora helped the Middlesbrough Tigers win the Fours Championship during the 1985 National League season. With Long Eaton in 1986, he averaged 9.18 over his 38 matches and in 1988 for Middlesbrough when he averaged 9.45 over his 32 matches for the Bears.

=== International ===
Fiora represented Australia in test matches both in Australia and overseas against various nations and composite teams.
