= South Australian Individual Speedway Championship =

Australian speedway competition

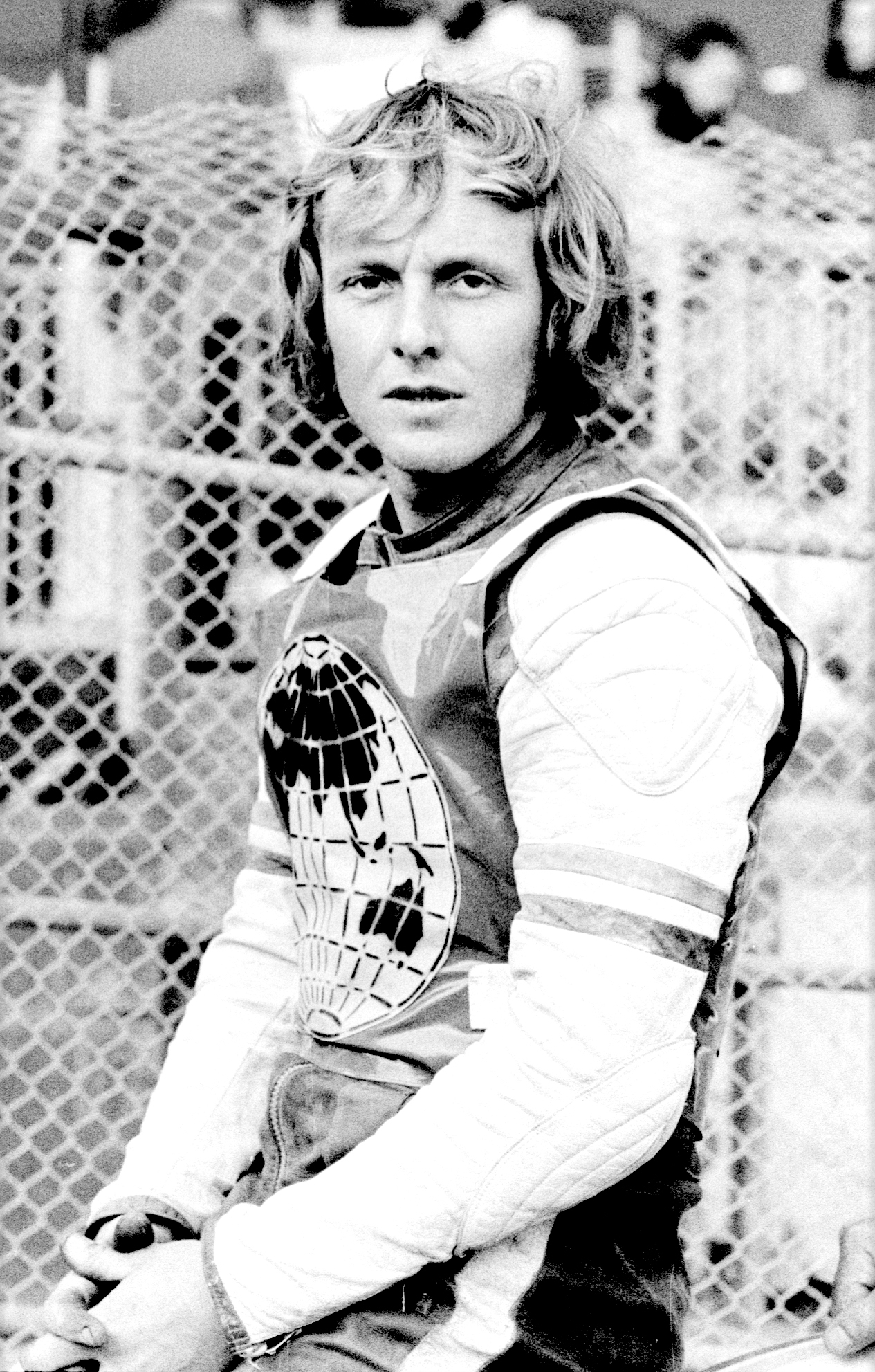
- John Boulger nine time champion
- Sport: Motorcycle speedway
- Most titles: Jack Young & John Boulger (9)

The South Australian Individual Speedway Championship (also known as the South Australian Solo Championship) is a Motorcycle speedway championship held annually to determine the South Australian Champion. The event is organised by the Speedway Riders' Association of South Australia Inc (SRA). and is sanctioned by Motorcycling Australia (MA).

== History ==
Jack Young and John Boulger, hold the record with nine championship wins each. Boulger holds the record of wins in a row with seven between 1971/72 and 1977/78, all at the Rowley Park Speedway in Adelaide.

Since 1999/2000 all SA Solo titles have been held at the Gillman Speedway in Adelaide, mostly due to the Riverview Speedway in Murray Bridge no longer seeing regular solo racing due to the track renovations in 1999 which included lengthening the track and putting clay in the surface in order to attract Sprintcars and Speedcars. Rowley Park holds the record for most championships held with 27 between 1949/50 and 1978/79.

No South Australian born rider has won the SA title since Rusty Harrison did so in 2002/03. Both Rory Schlein and Troy Batchelor who have won a combined 11 championships since 2002/03, were born outside of South Australia but relocated to Adelaide and are classed as local riders.

Five non Australian riders have won the SA Solo Championship. Ken McKinlay (Scotland), Ove Fundin (Sweden), Nigel Boocock, Doug Wyer and Dan Bewley (England).

== Winners since 1946/47 ==
Unless stated, all riders are from South Australia

Year	Venue	City	Winners
1946/47	Kilburn Speedway	Adelaide	Les Fredericks (NSW)
1947/48	Kilburn Speedway	Adelaide	Jack Young
1948/49	Kilburn Speedway	Adelaide	Aub Lawson (NSW) [3 Lap] Jack Williams [4 Lap]
1949/50	Kilburn Speedway; Rowley Park Speedway	Adelaide	Bob Leverenz; Merv Harding
1950/51	Rowley Park Speedway	Adelaide	Bob Leverenz
1951/52	Rowley Park Speedway	Adelaide	Bob Leverenz
1952/53	Rowley Park Speedway	Adelaide	Bob Leverenz
1953/54	Rowley Park Speedway	Adelaide	Jack Young
1954/55	Rowley Park Speedway	Adelaide	Jack Young
1955/56	Rowley Park Speedway	Adelaide	Jack Young
1956/57	Rowley Park Speedway	Adelaide	Ken McKinlay ( (Scotland) )
1957/58	Rowley Park Speedway	Adelaide	Jack Young
1958/59	Rowley Park Speedway	Adelaide	Jack Young
1959/60	Rowley Park Speedway	Adelaide	Jack Young
1960/61	Rowley Park Speedway	Adelaide	Ove Fundin ( (Sweden) )
1961/62	Not Held		
1962/63	Rowley Park Speedway	Adelaide	Jack Young
1963/64	Rowley Park Speedway	Adelaide	Jack Young
1964/65	Rowley Park Speedway	Adelaide	Jack Scott
1965/66	Not Held		
1966/67	Rowley Park Speedway	Adelaide	Jack Scott
1967/68	Not Held		
1968/69	Rowley Park Speedway	Adelaide	Nigel Boocock ( (England) )
1969/70	Rowley Park Speedway	Adelaide	John Boulger
1970/71	Rowley Park Speedway	Adelaide	Charlie Monk
1971/72	Rowley Park Speedway	Adelaide	John Boulger
1972/73	Rowley Park Speedway	Adelaide	John Boulger
1973/74	Rowley Park Speedway	Adelaide	John Boulger
1974/75	Rowley Park Speedway	Adelaide	John Boulger
1975/76	Rowley Park Speedway	Adelaide	John Boulger
1976/77	Rowley Park Speedway	Adelaide	John Boulger
1977/78	Rowley Park Speedway	Adelaide	John Boulger
1978/79	Rowley Park Speedway	Adelaide	Rob Maxfield
1979/80	Speedway Park	Virginia	Doug Wyer ( (England) )
1980/81	Speedway Park	Virginia	Tony Boyle
1981/82	Speedway Park	Virginia	John Boulger
1982/83	Speedway Park	Virginia	Mark Fiora
1983/84	North Arm Speedway	Adelaide	Mark Fiora
1984/85	Riverview Speedway	Murray Bridge	Mark Fiora
1985/86	North Arm Speedway	Adelaide	Steve Baker
1986/87	Westline Speedway	Whyalla	Mark Fiora
1987/88	Riverview Speedway	Murray Bridge	Craig Hodgson
1988/89	North Arm Speedway	Adelaide	Craig Hodgson
1989/90	North Arm Speedway	Adelaide	Scott Norman
1990/91	Riverview Speedway	Murray Bridge	Shane Parker
1991/92	North Arm Speedway	Adelaide	Craig Hodgson
1992/93	North Arm Speedway	Adelaide	Scott Norman
1993/94	North Arm Speedway	Adelaide	Shane Parker
1994/95	North Arm Speedway	Adelaide	Ryan Sullivan
1995/96	North Arm Speedway	Adelaide	Ryan Sullivan
1996/97	North Arm Speedway	Adelaide	Ryan Sullivan
1997/98	Riverview Speedway	Murray Bridge	Nigel Sadler
1998/99	Riverview Speedway	Murray Bridge	Jason Lyons (Vic)
1999/2000	Gillman Speedway	Adelaide	Nigel Sadler
2000/01	Gillman Speedway	Adelaide	Shane Parker
2001/02	Gillman Speedway	Adelaide	Shane Parker
2002/03	Gillman Speedway	Adelaide	Rusty Harrison
2003/04	Gillman Speedway	Adelaide	Rory Schlein
2004/05	Gillman Speedway	Adelaide	Rory Schlein
2005/06	Gillman Speedway	Adelaide	Rory Schlein
2006/07	Gillman Speedway	Adelaide	Rory Schlein
2007/08	Gillman Speedway	Adelaide	Troy Batchelor (Qld)
2008/09	Gillman Speedway	Adelaide	Troy Batchelor (Qld)
2009/10	Gillman Speedway	Adelaide	Troy Batchelor
2010/11	Gillman Speedway	Adelaide	Troy Batchelor
2011/12	Gillman Speedway	Adelaide	Cory Gathercole (Vic)
2012/13	Gillman Speedway]	Adelaide	Troy Batchelor
2013/14	Gillman Speedway	Adelaide	Cameron Woodward (Vic)
2014/15	Gillman Speedway	Adelaide	Jason Doyle
2015/16	Gillman Speedway	Adelaide	Rohan Tungate
2016/17	Gillman Speedway	Adelaide	Troy Batchelor
2017/18	Gillman Speedway	Adelaide	Justin Sedgmen
2018/19	Gillman Speedway	Adelaide	Max Fricke
2019/20	Gillman Speedway	Adelaide	Dan Bewley ( (England) )
2019/20	Gillman Speedway	Adelaide	Ryan Douglas
2021/22	Gillman Speedway	Adelaide	Justin Sedgmen
2022/23	Gillman Speedway	Adelaide	Rory Schlein
2023/24	Gillman Speedway	Adelaide	Justin Sedgmen
2024/25	Gillman Speedway	Adelaide	Mitchell Cluff
2025/26	Gillman Speedway	Adelaide	(United States) Luke Becker
