= 1983 Individual Speedway Junior European Championship =

European motorcycle speedway event

European Under-21 Championship
- Venue: Santa Marina Stadium
- Location: Lonigo, Italy
- Start date: 24 July 1983

The 1983 Individual Speedway Junior European Championship was the seventh edition of the European motorcycle speedway Under-21 Championships. All participants were under the age of 21.

The title was won by Steve Baker of Australia.

== European final ==
- 24 July 1983
- (Italy) Santa Marina Stadium, Lonigo

Placing	Rider	Total	1	2	3	4	5	6	7	8	9	10	11	12	13	14	15	16	17	18	19	20	Pts	Pos
1	(Australia) (8) Steve Baker	13		2						3			3			3			2				13	1
2	(New Zealand) (3) David Bargh	12	3						3				F				3				3		12	2
3	(England) (9) Marvyn Cox	11			0		3						2					3		3			11	3
4	(Denmark) (14) John Jørgensen	10				3		3					1		0							3	10	4
5	(Soviet Union) (12) Oleg Volokhov	10			1					1		3			3						2		10	5
6	(England) (1) Neil Evitts	10	2				2				2				1				3				10	6
7	(Hungary) (11) Jozsef Petrikovics	9			3				2		0					2						2	9	7
8	(Italy) (6) Valentino Furlanetto	8		3				F			3							2			F		8	8
9	(England) (10) Peter Carr	7			2			E						3			1		1				7	9
10	(Poland) (7) Zenon Kasprzak	6		1					1					0	2					2			6	10
11	(Hungary) (2) Sandor Tihanyi	5	0					2				2				F				1			5	11
12	(Denmark) (16) Jan O. Pedersen	5				F				2	1						2			0			5	12
13	(Soviet Union) (13) Vladimir Trofimov	5				2	0							1		1					1		5	13
14	(West Germany) (4) Heinz Huber	4	1							F				2				1				0	4	14
15	(Hungary) (5) Anders Kovacs	3		0			1					1					0					1	3	15
16	(Italy) (15) Giorgio Zaramella	1				1			0			0						0	0				1	16
17	(Italy) (17) Armando Castagna	0																					0	17
18	(Poland) (18) Wojciech Załuski	0																					0	18
Placing	Rider	Total	1	2	3	4	5	6	7	8	9	10	11	12	13	14	15	16	17	18	19	20	Pts	Pos

m - exclusion for exceeding two minute time allowance • t - exclusion for touching the tapes • x - other exclusion • e - retired or mechanical failure • f - fell • ns - non-starter • nc - non-classify

gate A - inside	gate B	gate C	gate D - outside
