= Steve Baker (speedway rider) =

Australian speedway rider

- Born: 25 June 1963 (age 63); Adelaide, Australia
- Nationality: Australian

Career history
- 1981-1984: Halifax Dukes
- 1985: Sheffield Tigers
- 1985: King's Lynn Stars

Individual honours
- 1983: European Junior Champion
- 1986: South Australian State Champion

Team honours
- 1987: World Pairs finalist

Steve Baker (born 25 June 1963) is a former international motorcycle speedway rider from Australia.

== Speedway career ==
Baker came to prominence after winning the 1983 Individual Speedway Junior European Championship, a competition that non-European riders were also allowed to enter.

Baker reached the final of the Speedway World Pairs Championship in the 1987 Speedway World Pairs Championship. Also in 1987, he finished runner up in the Australian Championship.

Baker rode in the top tier of British Speedway from 1981 to 1985, riding for various clubs.

== World Final appearances ==
=== World Pairs Championship ===
- 1987 - (Czech Republic) Pardubice, Svítkov Stadion (with Steve Regeling) - 7th - 21pts (16)

=== World Longtrack Championship ===
- 1987 (Germany) Mühldorf 8th 10pts
- 1988 (Germany) Scheeßel 17th 2pts
