= Craig Hodgson =

Australian speedway rider

- Born: 8 July 1968; Adelaide, Australia
- Died: 30 September 1998 (aged 30)
- Nationality: Australian

Career history
- 1987-1990: Peterborough Panthers
- 1991, 1993: Bradford Dukes

Individual honours
- 1988: Australian National Championships bronze
- 1989: Australian Junior Champion
- 1988, 1989, 1992: South Australian Champion

Team honours
- 1988, 1989: Fours Championship winner

Craig Hodgson (8 July 1968 – 30 September 1998) was an international motorcycle speedway rider from Australia.

== Speedway career ==
Hodgson won the bronze medal at the Australian National Championships. The following year in 1989, he became the Australian Junior champion. Also in 1989, he finished in tenth place during the 1989 Speedway Under-21 World Championship. In 1992, he was the Australian Longtrack champion.

Hodgson rode in the top tier of British Speedway from 1987 to 1993, riding for Peterborough Panthers and Bradford Dukes. He helped the Peterborough Panthers win the Fours Championship during the 1988 National League season. In 1989, he helped the Panthers win the Fours Championship again, during the 1989 National League season.

== Death ==
Hodgson died in 1998 after taking his own life.
