= Shane Bowes =

Australian speedway rider (born 1969)

- Born: 4 March 1969 (age 57); Adelaide, South Australia
- Nationality: Australian

Career history
- 1987: Newcastle Diamonds
- 1988–1993, 1995: Glasgow Tigers
- 1994: Reading Racers
- 1996–1997: Coventry Bees

Individual honours
- 1991: West End Speedway International
- 1996: Jack Young Memorial Cup

Team honours
- 1993: British League Division Two
- 1993: British League Div 2 KO Cup winner
- 1997: Craven Shield winner

Shane Leonard Bowes (born 4 March 1969, Adelaide, South Australia) is an Australian former motorcycle speedway rider. He earned 15 international caps for the Australia national speedway team.

== Career ==
Bowes first rode in the United Kingdom when he signed with the Newcastle Diamonds for the 1987 National League season. He then moved on to the Glasgow Tigers in 1988 where he made his home for the next six years.

Bowes qualified for thee 1990 Under-21 Speedway World Final in Lviv, where he finished 8th on 7 points with a win and two 2nd placings.

With Glasgow, Bowes won both the British League Division Two and the Division Two KO Cup in 1993. During the 1993 British League Division Two season he averaged 8.99 and finished third at the Australian Championship.

Bowes left Glasgow for Reading Racers in 1994 but returned to the Tigers in 1995. After a single season with Glasgow, Shane moved again, this time to the Coventry Bees for 1996 and 1997, winning the Craven Shield with the Bees in 1997.

Bowes retired from riding in the late 1990s, mostly due to injury and returned to live in Adelaide with his wife and three children. He ran a pump sales, repairs and installation business called Shane Bowes Contracting, and also worked for his father's (Len) lawn mower sales and repair business.

Bowes made a one-off comeback and got back on a bike for the Gillman Speedway classic speedway meeting held in Adelaide on 1 November 2015. Bowes showed he had lost little of his skill when he dominated the Two Valve Solo Championship for the over 40-year-old's, remaining unbeaten on the afternoon.

== Family ==
Bowes' son Fraser is also a speedway rider.

== World Final Appearances ==
=== Individual Under-21 World Championship ===
- 1990 - (Soviet Union) Lviv, Stadium Ska - 8th - 7pts
