= 2022 British Speedway Championship =

The 2022 British Speedway Championship was the 62nd edition of the British Speedway Championship.

== Summary ==
The final was held at the National Speedway Stadium and was won by Dan Bewley.

The original date for the competition had been 1 August but bad weather forced the cancellation of the event after 12 heats. Three riders had been leading at the time with 8 points each, they were Bewley, Tom Brennan and Chris Harris.

== Results ==
=== The Final ===
- (England) National Speedway Stadium, Manchester
- 18 September 2022

Placing	Rider	Total	1	2	3	4	5	6	7	8	9	10	11	12	13	14	15	16	17	18	19	20	Pts	Pos	21	22
1	(6) Dan Bewley	15		3				3			3							3			3		15	1		3
2	(16) Tom Brennan	10				1				3	2						2			2			10	5	3	2
3	(8) Craig Cook	12		1						2			3			3			3				12	2		1
4	(13) Danny King	11				2	3							3		2					1		11	3	2	0
5	(5) Kyle Howarth	10		2			1					1					3					3	10	4	1	
6	(15) Adam Ellis	9				3			1			3						0	2				9	6	0	
7	(11) Richard Lawson	8			3				3		0					0						2	8	7		
8	(1) Connor Mountain	8	1				2				1				3				1				8	8		
9	(9) Charles Wright	7			2		0						0					2		3			7	9		
10	(4) Steve Worrall	7	3							1				1				1				1	7	10		
11	(2) Leon Flint	7	2					2				2				1				0			7	11		
12	(3) Chris Harris	6	0						2				2				0				2		6	12		
13	(7) Paul Starke	3		0					0					2	0					1			3	13		
14	(14) Scott Nicholls	3				0		1					1		1							0	3	14		
15	(12) Richie Worrall	2			0					0		0			2						0		2	15		
16	(10) Simon Lambert	2			1			0						0			1		0				2	16		
17	(17) Jordan Jenkins (res)	0																					0	17		
18	(18) Jack Shimelt (res)	0																					0	18		
Placing	Rider	Total	1	2	3	4	5	6	7	8	9	10	11	12	13	14	15	16	17	18	19	20	Pts	Pos	21	22

m - exclusion for exceeding two minute time allowance • t - exclusion for touching the tapes • x - other exclusion • e - retired or mechanical failure • f - fell • ns - non-starter • nc - non-classify

gate A - inside	gate B	gate C	gate D - outside

=== Under 21 final ===
Leon Flint won the British Speedway Under 21 Championship held at Perry Barr Stadium on 31 August.

Pos.	Rider	Points	SF	Final
1	Leon Flint	15	x	3
2	Dan Thompson	11	3	2
3	Connor Bailey	10	2	1
4	Tom Brennan	13	x	0
5	Joe Thompson	12	1	
6	Nathan Ablitt	9	0	
7	Jason Edwards	8		
8	Henry Atkins	8		
9	Drew Kemp	7		
10	Ace Pijper	6		
11	Sam Hagon	5		
12	Max Perry	5		
13	Harry McGurk	5		
14	Jody Scott	3		
15	Sam McGurk	3		
16	Vinnie Foord	1		
17	Jack Shimelt	1		
