= 2020 British Speedway Championship =

The 2020 British Speedway Championship was the 60th edition of the British Speedway Championship. The competition was cut short due to the coronavirus pandemic, with the semi-finals being cancelled. The final was originally set to take place at Ipswich with limited fans in attendance, however it was later switched to the National Speedway Stadium in Manchester. due to bad weather Defending champion Charles Wright decided not to defend his title.

The final was won by Australian Rory Schlein, who rode under an ACU (British) licence. He beat Richard Lawson and former three-time world champion Jason Crump, who also rode under an ACU (British) licence, in the final.

== Results ==
=== The Final ===
- (England) National Speedway Stadium, Manchester
- 28 September 2020

Placing	Rider	Total	1	2	3	4	5	6	7	8	9	10	11	12	13	14	15	16	17	18	19	20	Pts	Pos	21	22
1	(16) Rory Schlein ( (Australia) )	12				2				3	2						2			3			12	1		3
2	(11) Richard Lawson	11			3				3		3					1						1	11	2		2
3	(9) Jason Crump ( (Australia) )	11			2		3						3					1		2			11	4	3	1
4	(5) Steve Worrall	10		1			1					3					3					2	10	6	2	0
5	(4) Chris Harris	10	0							2				2				3				3	10	5	1	
6	(7) Richie Worrall	11		3					1					3	3					1			11	3	0	
7	(2) Drew Kemp	8	1					3				1				3				0			8	7		
8	(3) Danny King	8	2						2				0				1				3		8	8		
9	(13) Ben Barker	8				1	2							1		2					2		8	9		
10	(1) Lewis Kerr	7	3				0				0				1				3				7	10		
11	(15) Paul Starke	7				3			0			2						0	2				7	11		
12	(6) Josh Auty	5		2				0			1							2			0		5	12		
13	(12) Tom Brennan	5			1					1		0			2						1		5	13		
14	(14) Dan Thompson	3				0		2					1		0							0	3	14		
15	(8) Josh Bates	2		0						0			2			0			0				2	15		
16	(10) Joe Thompson	2			0			1						0			0		1				2	16		
17	(17) Ben Woodhull (res)	0																					0	17		
Placing	Rider	Total	1	2	3	4	5	6	7	8	9	10	11	12	13	14	15	16	17	18	19	20	Pts	Pos	21	22

m - exclusion for exceeding two minute time allowance • t - exclusion for touching the tapes • x - other exclusion • e - retired or mechanical failure • f - fell • ns - non-starter • nc - non-classify

gate A - inside	gate B	gate C	gate D - outside

Dan Thompson replaced Edward Kennett in the meeting.
Chris Harris was a non starter in his first ride.
Josh Bates retired in his first two rides.
Dan Thompson retired in his first ride.
Ritchie Worrall fell in the semi-final whilst in second place.

=== Under 21 final ===
Dan Bewley won the British Speedway Under 21 Championship held at Shielfield Park on 21 October.

Pos.	Rider	Points
1	Dan Bewley	15
2	Leon Flint	14
3	Anders Rowe	13
4	Drew Kemp	12
5	Tom Brennan	8
6	Dan Thompson	8
7	Jack Thomas	8
8	Joe Lawlor	8
9	Jason Edwards	6
10	Jordan Palin	6
11	Joe Thompson	5
12	Dan Gilkes	4
13	Jamie Halder	4
14	Harry McGurk (res)	3
15	Tom Spencer	3
16	Alex Spooner	1
17	Kyle Bickley	0
18	Mason Watson (res)	0
