= 2023 National Development League speedway season =

Third tier of 2023 British speedway season

- League: National Development League
- Champions: Oxford Chargers
- Knockout Cup: Mildenhall Fen Tigers
- Riders' Championship: Connor Bailey
- Highest average: Dan Thompson
- Division/s above: SGB Premiership; SGB Championship

The 2023 National Development League was the third division/tier of British speedway for the 2023 season. It was a semi-professional development league, containing mainly the junior sides of SGB Premiership and SGB Championship clubs. Leicester Lion Cubs were the defending champions having won the title in 2022. Oxford Chargers won the title, defeating Leicester in a one-off Grand Final.

== Summary ==
Eight clubs competed for the National Development League Championship after the addition of the Workington Comets to the league, who raced on the new Northside track. Armadale Devils were renamed Edinburgh Monarchs Academy, while the Plymouth Centurions did not return.

The league points system changed in-line with the SGB Premiership and SGB Championship, with teams scoring two points for a win (home or away), with a bonus point scored for an aggregate win. A 'Super Heat' was also introduced in the event of a tied meeting, with the winners scoring two league points and the losers gaining one point. The top two in the league qualified for the Grand Final. The rider points limit for team construction was 42 points.

Locations of the 2023 National Development League teams

Defending champions Leicester Lion Cubs topped the table, however they lost a one-off Grand Final to the Oxford Chargers. The final was initially supposed to be a two-legged affair, however Leicester were unable to stage their home fixture due to bad weather and the BSPA ruled the title would be decided on the outcome of the Oxford leg. Oxford won the final 34–32, with the meeting ending after just 11 heats due to rain. It was the first major trophy Oxford had won since the Cheetahs claimed the Craven Shield in 2005.

Mildenhall Fen Tigers were controversially awarded the NDL KO Cup after Leicester were also unable to host the home leg of the final. Leicester had won the away leg, but the BSPA ruled a 75-0 walkover for Mildenhall in the second leg.

Workington's Connor Bailey won the Riders' Championship, while Leicester's Dan Thompson topped the averages for the second year running.

== League ==
=== League table ===
Pos.	Club	M	Home			Away			F	A	B	Pts	+/−
Pos.	Club	M	W	SHL	L	W	SHL	L	F	A	B	Pts	+/−
1	Leicester Lion Cubs (Q)	14	7	0	0	5	0	2	708	543	7	31	+165
2	Oxford Chargers (Q)	14	7	0	0	4	0	3	710	542	5	27	+168
3	Belle Vue Colts	14	6	0	1	2	0	5	675	583	6	22	+92
4	Mildenhall Fen Tigers	14	6	0	1	2	0	5	592	632	3	19	-40
5	Monarchs Academy	14	5	0	2	1	0	6	614	641	4	16	-27
6	Workington Comets	14	4	0	3	1	0	6	575	648	2	12	-73
7	Kent Royals	14	5	0	2	0	0	7	545	684	1	11	-139
8	Berwick Bullets	14	1	0	6	0	0	7	540	686	0	2	-146

Fixtures & results

Home \ Away	BEL	BER	EDI	KEN	LEI	MIL	OXF	WOR
Belle Vue		61–29	54–36	67–23	41–49	52–38	56–33	49–41
Berwick	44–46		38–51	43–23	30–59	43–46	44–46	38–48
Edinburgh	50–40	46–44		52–37	43–47	54–36	32–57	59–31
Kent	54–36	54–34	48–41		38–50	47–43	39–51	50–40
Leicester	51–39	47–42	53–37	56–34		61–28	50–38	61–29
Mildenhall	47–43	49–41	48–41	53–37	44–46		45–43	30–29
Oxford	49–40	60–30	55–35	64–26	50–39	54–36		59–31
Workington	39–51	50–40	53–37	54–35	50–39	41–49	39–51	

Legend: Blue = home team win; Yellow = draw; Red = away team win.

=== Grand Final ===
31 October

Oxford Chargers; Ryan Kinsley 8 Henry Atkins 7 Jordan Jenkins 6 Jody Scott 5 Luke Killeen 3 Jacob Clouting 3 Jason Garrad 2	34–32	Leicester Lion Cubs; Dan Thompson 8 Joe Thompson 8 Tom Spencer 5 Ashton Boughen 4 Vinnie Foord 4 Max James 3 Max Perry 0	Oxford Stadium; Referee(s): Simon Humphrey-Kennett

== Knockout Cup ==
The 2023 National Development League Knockout Cup was the 24th edition of the Knockout Cup for tier three teams. It was limited to teams that were not also running promotions in the SGB Championship. It ended in controversial circumstances as Leicester were unable to stage their home leg of the final, and the competition was therefore awarded to Mildenhall.

**Semi-finals**
Kent Royals	**44**	29	73
**Mildenhall Fen Tigers**	46	**60**	106
Workington Comets	**37**	23	60
**Leicester Lion Cubs**	53	**49**	102

**Grand Final**
**Mildenhall Fen Tigers**	**38**	75	113
Leicester Lion Cubs	49	**0**	49

Home team scores are in bold
Overall aggregate scores are in red

=== Final ===
First leg

8 October

Mildenhall Fen Tigers; George Congreve 11; Ben Trigger 10; Kai Ward (guest) 9 William Richardson 3 Arran Butcher 3 Alfie Bowtell 2 Jody Scott (guest) 0	38–49	Leicester Lion Cubs; Ashton Boughen 15; Jacob Hook (guest) 13; Max Perry 12; Tom Spencer 5 Max James 4 Jack Smith (guest) 0 Vinnie Foord 0	Mildenhall Stadium; Referee(s): Wayne Jarvis

Second leg

30 October

Leicester Lion Cubs	0–75 (awarded)	Mildenhall Fen Tigers	Beaumont Park

== Riders' Championship ==
The 2023 National League Riders' Championship took place on Sunday 15 October, at Northside Speedway, Workington and was won by Connor Bailey.

Pos.	Rider	Pts	Total
1	Connor Bailey (Workington)	3,3,3,3,3	15
2	Max Clegg (Edinburgh)	2,2,2,3,3	12+3
3	Jacob Hook (Edinburgh)	1,3,3,2,3	12+2
4	Ashton Boughen (Leicester)	2,3,3,0,3	11
5	Ben Morley (Kent)	2,1,2,3,2	10
6	Sam McGurk (Workington)	1,2,3,2,1	9
7	Freddy Hodder (Belle Vue)	3,2,2,1,1	9
8	Ben Trigger (Mildenhall)	0,3,0,3,2	8
9	Max Perry (Leicester)	3,0,1,2,0	6
10	Danny Phillips (Berwick)	X,1,2,2,1	6
11	Lee Complin (Mildenhall)	3,2,X,-,-	5
12	Tom Woolley (Kent)	2,0,1,0,2	5
13	Jamie Halder (Berwick)	0,0,1,1,2	4
14	Luke Muff (Belle Vue)	1,1,1,1,-	4
15	Jacob Clouting (Oxford)	1,1,0,1,1	4
16	Jody Scott (Oxford)	0,0,0,0,R	0
17	Callum Foy - res (Workington)	-,-,-,0,0	0
18	Ben Rathbone - res (Berwick)	-,-,-,-,0	0

- F=fell, R=retired, X=excluded TM=two minute warning excluded

== Leading averages ==
	Rider	Team	Average
1	Dan Thompson	Leicester	10.64
2	Jordan Jenkins	Oxford	10.43
3	Henry Atkins	Oxford	10.17
4	Connor Bailey	Workington	10.03
5	Joe Thompson	Leicester	9.82
6	Alfie Bowtell	Mildenhall	9.80
7	Max Clegg	Edinburgh	9.57
8	James Pearson	Belle Vue	9.24
9	Jack Smith	Belle Vue	9.15
10	Adam Roynon	Edinburgh	9.02

- averages include league, play offs & knockout cup, min 6 matches

== Squads & final averages ==
=== Belle Vue Colts ===
- (Australia) James Pearson 9.24
- (England) Jack Smith (C) 9.15
- (England) Sam Hagon 8.63
- (England) Freddy Hodder 7.31
- (Australia) Matt Marson 7.21
- (England) Luke Muff 6.00
- (England) Paul Bowen 4.39
- (England) Jack Shimelt 1.00

=== Berwick Bullets ===
- (England) Connor Coles 7.86
- (England) Steve Boxall 7.73
- (England) Danny Phillips 7.21
- (Scotland) Greg Blair (C) 6.75
- (England) Jamie Halder 5.97
- (England) Josh Embleton 4.80
- (Scotland) Mason Watson 4.48
- (England) Ben Rathbone 4.00
- (Scotland) Kieran Douglas 2.80

=== Edinburgh Monarchs Academy ===
- (England) Max Clegg 9.57
- (England) Kyle Bickley 9.05
- (England) Adam Roynon 9.02
- (Australia) Jacob Hook 8.75
- (England) Alex Spooner 6.40
- (England) Mickie Simpson 5.27
- (Australia) Dayle Wood 5.17
- (England) Kyran Lyden 3.40
- (England) Mark Parker 1.94

=== Kent Royals ===
- (England) Nathan Ablitt 8.38
- (England) Ben Morley 8.26
- (England) Jack Kingston 6.91
- (England) Tom Woolley (C) 6.58
- (England) Rhys Naylor 6.10
- (England) Joe Alcock 4.57
- (England) Connor King 4.00
- (England) Ashton Vale 3.56

=== Leicester Lion Cubs ===
- (England) Dan Thompson 10.64
- (England) Joe Thompson (C) 9.82
- (England) Ashton Boughen 8.61
- (England) Max Perry 8.15
- (England) Max James 6.77
- (England) Tom Spencer 6.70
- (England) Vinnie Ford 5.43

=== Mildenhall Fen Tigers ===
- (England) Alfie Bowtell 9.80
- (England) Lee Complin (C) 8.50
- (England) Ben Trigger 7.16
- (New Zealand) George Congreve 6.67
- (England) Arran Butcher 5.94
- (England) Josh Warren 5.33
- (England) William Richardson 2.07

=== Oxford Chargers ===
- (England) Jordan Jenkins (C) 10.43
- (England) Henry Atkins 10.17
- (Australia) Luke Killeen 8.49
- (England) Ryan Kinsley 8.31
- (England) Kelsey Dugard 7.43
- (England) Jody Scott 6.69
- (England) Jacob Clouting 6.06
- (England) Jason Garrad 5.85
- (England) Jacob Fellows 0.86

=== Workington Comets ===
- (Australia) Connor Bailey 10.03
- (England) Luke Harrison 7.01
- (Scotland) Ace Pijper 6.90
- (England) Sam McGurk 6.77
- (England) Luke Crang (C) 4.80
- (England) Elliot Kelly 4.68
- (England) Harry McGurk 2.82
- (England) Callum Foy 0.00

== See also ==
- List of United Kingdom speedway league champions
- Knockout Cup (speedway)
