= 2023 British Speedway Championship =

British motorcycle speedway competition

The 2023 British Speedway Championship (sponsored by Sports Insure) was the 63rd edition of the British Speedway Championship.

== Summary ==
The final was held on 14 August at the National Speedway Stadium in Manchester. Dan Bewley successfully defended his title.

The Under 21 final was held on 16 July at Ashfield Stadium in Glasgow and was won by Connor Bailey. The Under 19 final was held at Perry Barr Stadium and was won by Dan Thompson.

== Results ==
=== The final ===
- (England) National Speedway Stadium, Manchester
- 14 August 2023

Pos.	Rider	Points	SF	Final
1	Dan Bewley	12	x	3
2	Steve Worrall	12	x	2
3	Ben Barker	12	2	1
4	Richard Lawson	9	3	0
5	Adam Ellis	11	1	
6	Chris Harris	11	0	
7	Tom Brennan	9		
8	Simon Lambert	8		
9	Charles Wright	8		
10	Danny King	7		
11	Connor Mountain	6		
12	Kyle Howarth	5		
13	Leon Flint	4		
14	Joe Thompson	2		
15	Danyon Hume	2		
16	Freddy Hodder (res)	1		
17	Sam Hagon	0		

=== Under 21 final ===
- (Scotland) Ashfield Stadium, Glasgow
- 16 July 2023

Pos.	Rider	Points	SF	Final
1	Connor Bailey ( (Australia) )	13	x	3
2	Anders Rowe	15	x	2
3	Dan Thompson	11	2	1
4	Dan Gilkes	11	3	0
5	Drew Kemp	10	1	
6	Jason Edwards	12	0	
7	Leon Flint	10		
8	Sam Hagon	9		
9	Nathan Ablitt	8		
10	Ashton Boughen	6		
11	Sam McGurk	5		
12	Ace Pijper	3		
13	Ben Trigger	3		
14	Jody Scott	2		
15	Mickie Simpson	2		
16	Freddy Hodder	0		

=== Under 19 final ===
- (England) Perry Barr Stadium, Birmingham
- 25 October 2023

Pos.	Rider	Points
1	Dan Thompson	14+3
2	Nathan Ablitt	14+2
3	Joe Thompson	12
4	Ben Trigger	10
5	Freddie Hodder	10
6	Sam McGurk	9
7	Luke Killeen	7
8	Max James	7
9	Luke Harrison	7
10	Mickie Simpson	7
11	Jody Scott	5
12	Billy Budd	5
13	Vinnie Foord	5
14	Max Perry	4
15	Senna Summers	2
16	Mark Parker	0
