= SGB Premiership 2023 =

88th season of British Speedway

- League: Premiership
- No. of competitors: 7
- Champions: Sheffield Tigers
- Knockout Cup: Ipswich Witches
- Pairs Championship: Belle Vue Aces
- Highest average: Emil Sayfutdinov
- Division/s below: SGB Championship; NDL 2023

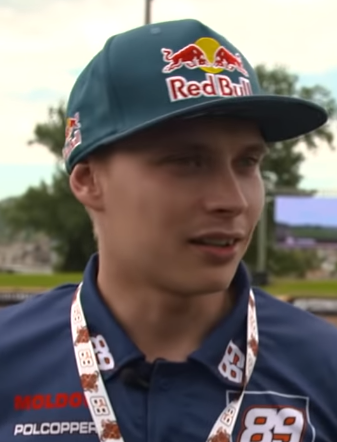
Sayfutdinov signed for Ipswich in 2023, where he won the Knockout Cup and topped the averages

The 2023 Sports Insure SGB Premiership was the 88th season of the top tier of British speedway and the 6th known as the SGB Premiership.

There was an increase of one team after the Leicester Lions opted to move up from the SGB Championship.

Defending champions Belle Vue Aces topped the table, but were knocked out in the playoff semi-finals. Last year's runners-up Sheffield Tigers went on to win the title, beating Ipswich Witches in the Grand Final. It was the first time Sheffield had won a top flight British speedway championship.

Locations of the 2023 SGB Premiership teams

== 2023 summary ==
Seven clubs competed for the league championship, with Leicester Lions joining them from the division below. Each club raced against each other four times (home and away twice), meaning a total of 24 fixtures each. The 'Super Heat' scoring system was retained from the 2022 season, however extra points for away fixtures were scrapped in favour of an aggregate bonus point.

The top four teams in the league qualified for the playoffs, with the two semi-final winners then reaching the Grand Final. The points limit remained at 39 points for six riders, with one additional 'rising star'.

Sheffield Tigers won the title for the first time in their history. They beat Ipswich Witches in the final, overcoming an 18-point first leg deficit to win 92–88 on aggregate. Belle Vue Aces finished the regular season top of the table, but were eliminated at the semi-final stage by Ipswich.

Despite missing out on the league title, Ipswich won the Knockout Cup, which returned for the first time since 2019. They beat Sheffield 97–83 in the final. Belle Vue Aces won the Pairs Championship.

The 2023 season also marked the final seasons for Wolverhampton Wolves and Peterborough Panthers after the closure of their tracks.

== League ==
=== Regular season ===
League table

Pos.	Club	M	Home			Away			F	A	B	Pts	+/−
Pos.	Club	M	W	SHL	L	W	SHL	L	F	A	B	Pts	+/−
1	Belle Vue Aces	24	11	0	1	6	0	6	1173	981	10	44	+192
2	Wolverhampton Wolves	24	11	1	0	3	2	7	1117	1045	7	38	+72
3	Sheffield Tigers	24	11	0	1	4	0	8	1120	1009	7	37	+111
4	Ipswich Witches	24	9	0	3	5	0	7	1097	1063	6	34	+34
5	Leicester Lions	24	8	1	3	5	1	6	1077	1081	6	34	-4
6	Peterborough Panthers	24	6	0	6	1	1	10	1008	1121	5	20	-113
7	Kings Lynn Stars	24	4	0	8	0	0	12	930	1224	1	9	-294

A fixtures

Home \ Away	BEL	IPS	KLN	LEI	PET	SHF	WOL
Belle Vue		55–35	47–43	52–38	56–34	43–47	45–45
Ipswich	41–49		52–38	47–43	52–38	47–43	39–51
Kings Lynn	41–49	40–50		43–47	54–36	31–59	49–41
Leicester	45–45	52–38	54–36		47–42	53–37	49–41
Peterborough	35–55	42–48	53–37	43–47		53–37	34–56
Sheffield	48–42	51–39	60–30	44–46	37–23		50–40
Wolverhampton	46–44	49–41	56–34	45–45	50–40	50–40	

Legend: Blue = home team win; Yellow = draw; Red = away team win.

B fixtures

Home \ Away	BEL	IPS	KLN	LEI	PET	SHF	WOL
Belle Vue		49–41	57–27	61–29	55–35	52–38	57–33
Ipswich	44–46		51–39	51–39	54–36	51–39	47–43
Kings Lynn	46–44	44–46		44–46	44–46	33–57	45–45
Leicester	52–38	37–53	57–33		57–33	42–47	39–51
Peterborough	41–49	43–47	49–41	58–32		53–37	54–36
Sheffield	50–40	51–39	57–33	54–36	48–42		54–36
Wolverhampton	47–43	46–44	65–25	45–45	45–45	55–35	

Legend: Blue = home team win; Yellow = draw; Red = away team win.
- Asterisk indicates super heat winner

=== Play offs ===
**Semi Finals**
1	Belle Vue Aces	36	**51**	87
4	**Ipswich Witches**	**54**	39	93
3	**Sheffield Tigers**	50	**39**	89
2	Wolverhampton Wolves	**40**	21	61

**Grand Final**
Ipswich Witches	**54**	34	88
**Sheffield Tigers**	36	**56**	92

Home team scores are in bold
Overall aggregate scores are in red

=== Grand final ===
First leg

3 October

Ipswich Witches; Jason Doyle 15; Emil Sayfutdinov 13; Danny King 10; Keynan Rew 5 Danyon Hume 5 Erik Riss 5 Joe Thompson (guest) 1	54–36	Sheffield Tigers; Robert Lambert (guest) 9 Josh Pickering 8 Richard Lawson (guest) 6 Jason Edwards 5 Kyle Howarth 3 Connor Mountain (guest) 3 Chris Holder 2	Foxhall Stadium; Referee(s): Jim McGregor

Second leg

5 October

Sheffield Tigers; Chris Holder 11; Chris Harris (guest) 9 Robert Lambert (guest) 9 Jye Etheridge (guest) 9 Josh Pickering 8 Kyle Howarth 5 Jason Edwards 5	56–34	Ipswich Witches; Emil Sayfutdinov 11; Jason Doyle 9 Danny King 5 Erik Riss 3 Keynan Rew 3 Danyon Hume 2 Joe Thompson (guest) 1	Owlerton Stadium; Referee(s): Jim McGregor

== Knockout Cup ==
The 2023 Knockout Cup was the 78th edition of the Knockout Cup for tier one teams, but the first since 2019. It was won by the Ipswich Witches, who beat Sheffield Tigers 97–83 in the final.

=== Bracket ===
**Quarter Finals**
**Wolverhampton Wolves**	**46**	36	82
Belle Vue Aces	20	**54**	74
**Sheffield Tigers**	**58**	56	114
Kings Lynn Stars	32	**34**	66
**Ipswich Witches**	**48**	47	95
Leicester Lions	42	**43**	85
Bye
**Peterborough Panthers**

**Semi Finals**
Wolverhampton Wolves	36	**52**	88
**Sheffield Tigers**	**54**	38	92
**Ipswich Witches**	**57**	42	99
Peterborough Panthers	33	**48**	81

**Final**
Sheffield Tigers	**48**	35	83
**Ipswich Witches**	42	**55**	97

Home team scores are in bold
Overall aggregate scores are in red

=== Final ===
First leg

11 September

Sheffield Tigers; Josh Pickering 11; Kyle Howarth 10; Tobiasz Musielak 9 Chris Holder 9 Kyle Newman (guest) 4 Jason Edwards 3 Max Fricke (guest) 2	48–42	Ipswich Witches; Danny King 10; Emil Sayfutdinov 9 Jason Doyle 8 Erik Riss 7 Keynan Rew 6 Danyon Hume 2 Joe Thompson (guest) 0	Owlerton Stadium; Referee(s): Craig Ackroyd

Second leg

14 September

Ipswich Witches; Emil Sayfutdinov 13; Jason Doyle 12; Danny King 12; Keynan Rew 9 Danyon Hume 4 Erik Riss 3 Joe Thompson (guest) 2	55–35	Sheffield Tigers; Tobias Musielak 9 Max Fricke (guest) 8 Chris Holder 6 Jason Edwards 5 Josh Pickering 4 Kyle Howarth 2 Kyle Newman (guest) 1	Foxhall Stadium; Referee(s): Christina Turnbull

== Pairs Championship ==
The 2023 Premiership Pairs Championship took place at Pidcock Motorcycles Arena in Leicester on Thursday 29 June 2023. Belle Vue won the event defeating Peterborough in the final.

=== Qualifying heats ===
Pos	Team	Pts	Riders
1	Peterborough Panthers	33	Richie Worrall 23, Ben Cook 8, Jordan Jenkins 2
2	Belle Vue Aces	32	Dan Bewley 20, Brady Kurtz 12, Jake Mulford 0
3	Sheffield Tigers	29	Jack Holder 16, Tobiasz Musielak 13, Dan Gilkes 0
4	Leicester Lions	26	Max Fricke 19, Drew Kemp 5, Justin Sedgmen 2
5	Ipswich Witches	26	Danny King 18, Erik Riss 8, Dan Thompson 0
6	Kings Lynn Stars	22	Nicolai Klindt 22, Thomas Jørgensen 0, Anders Rowe 0
7	Wolverhampton Wolves	21	Steve Worrall 16, Sam Masters 5, Leon Flint 0

=== Semi-final ===
Team One	Team Two	Score	Result
Belle Vue	Sheffield	7-2	Kurtz 4, Bewley 3, Holder 2, Musielak 0

=== Final ===
Team One	Team Two	Score	Result
Belle Vue	Peterborough	7-2	Kurtz 4, Bewley 3, R.Worrall 2, Cook 0

== Leading averages ==
	Rider	Team	Average
1	(Russia) Emil Sayfutdinov	Ipswich	10.64
2	(Australia) Jason Doyle	Ipswich	9.98
3	(England) Robert Lambert	King's Lynn	9.71
4	(Australia) Jack Holder	Sheffield	9.65
5	(Poland) Tobiasz Musielak	Sheffield	9.24
6	(England) Tai Woffinden	Sheffield	9.12
7	(Australia) Brady Kurtz	Belle Vue	8.94
8	(Australia) Max Fricke	Leicester	8.82
9	(England) Dan Bewley	Belle Vue	8.31
10	(Russia) Artem Laguta	King's Lynn/Peterborough	8.20

- averages include league, play offs & knockout cup, min 6 matches

== Squads & final averages ==
=== Belle Vue Aces ===
- (Australia) Brady Kurtz (C) 8.94
- (England) Dan Bewley 8.31
- (Australia) Jaimon Lidsey 8.16
- (England) Charles Wright 7.81
- (England) Tom Brennan 7.05
- (Germany) Norick Blödorn 6.27
- (Australia) Connor Bailey (Rising Star) 4.22
- (England) Jake Mulford (Rising Star) 2.21

=== Ipswich Witches ===
- (Russia) / (Poland) Emil Sayfutdinov 10.64
- (Australia) Jason Doyle 9.98
- (England) Danny King (C) 8.03
- (England) Dan Thompson (Rising Star) 5.33
- (Australia) Keynan Rew 4.98
- (Germany) Erik Riss 4.79
- (England) Danyon Hume 4.08
- (England) Ben Barker 3.83
- (England) Joe Thompson (Rising Star) 1.87

=== King's Lynn Stars ===
- (England) Robert Lambert 9.71
- (Denmark) Nicolai Klindt (C) 6.96
- (Poland) Krzysztof Kasprzak 6.21
- (Denmark) Michael Palm Toft 5.52
- (England) Simon Lambert 5.46
- (Denmark) Thomas Jørgensen 5.40
- (Denmark) Frederik Jakobsen 5.33
- (England) Anders Rowe (Rising Star) 5.00
- (Australia) Kye Thomson 3.29
- (Denmark) Emil Breum 2.59

=== Leicester Lions ===
- (Australia) Max Fricke (C) 8.82
- (England) Richard Lawson 7.12
- (England) Lewis Kerr 7.11
- (Australia) Nick Morris 6.89
- (England) Richie Worrall 6.63
- (Australia) Justin Sedgmen 6.62
- (England) Drew Kemp (Rising Star) 5.35
- (Australia) Jake Allen 5.04
- (Australia) Troy Batchelor 3.33
- (England) Craig Cook 3.08

=== Peterborough Panthers ===
- (England) Chris Harris (C) 7.44
- (Russia) / (Poland) Vadim Tarasenko 7.44
- (Russia) / (Poland) Artem Laguta 7.33
- (Denmark) Niels Kristian Iversen 7.03
- (Australia) Ben Cook 6.74
- (Denmark) Benjamin Basso 6.64
- (Poland) Patryk Wojdyło 6.00
- (England) Jordan Jenkins (Rising Star) 5.19
- (Denmark) Hans Andersen 5.13
- (Denmark) Nicki Pedersen 0.00 (1 match only)

=== Sheffield Tigers ===
- (Australia) Jack Holder 9.65
- (Poland) Tobiasz Musielak 9.24
- (England) Tai Woffinden 9.12
- (Australia) Josh Pickering 7.75
- (Australia) Chris Holder 7.68
- (England) Kyle Howarth (C) 6.86
- (England) Adam Ellis 6.24
- (France) David Bellego 4.95
- (England) Jason Edwards (Rising Star) 4.46
- (England) Dan Gilkes (Rising Star) 4.05
- (Denmark) Claus Vissing 2.00

=== Wolverhampton Wolves ===
- (Australia) Sam Masters (C) 8.09
- (Australia) Ryan Douglas 7.86
- (England) Steve Worrall 7.60
- (United States) Luke Becker 7.01
- (Australia) Rory Schlein 6.26
- (Australia) Zach Cook 5.77
- (England) Leon Flint (Rising Star) 4.79

== See also ==
- SGB Championship 2023
- SGB National Development League 2023
- British Speedway League Champions
