= SGB Championship 2019 =

British motorcycle speedway season

- League: SGB Championship
- Champions: Leicester Lions
- Knockout Cup: Redcar Bears
- Shield: Leicester Lions
- Individual: Erik Riss
- Pairs: Glasgow Tigers
- Fours: Somerset Rebels
- Highest average: Sam Masters
- Division/s above: SGB Premiership
- Division/s below: National Development League

The SGB Championship 2019 was the second division of British speedway. The season ran between March and October 2019 and consisted of 12 participating teams. The defending league champions were the Workington Comets, who completed an excellent 2018 season winning three major trophies.

== Summary ==
Four new teams joined the SGB Championship in 2019 with two of them dropping down from the 2018 SGB Premiership league season. These teams were Leicester Lions and Somerset Rebels with Ipswich Witches and Peterborough Panthers moving in the opposite direction. Two teams from the third tier of British speedway the National League Birmingham Brummies and Eastbourne Eagles moved up into this season's league while the Lakeside Hammers did not compete.

On 14 January 2019, the Workington Comets management announced that they would not be competing in the league in 2019 for financial reasons.

== Regulation changes ==
At the Speedway AGM in November 2018, a number of changes were made to the rules and regulations for 2019. The biggest change was the lowering of teams' points averages to 38.00 per team; this was done to reduce the running costs of teams. Riders who started out in the National League would receive a 2.5% reduction on their average. New riders who have previously ridden in the professional leagues in either Poland, Sweden or Denmark would automatically be given a 5.00 average and riders who have never ridden in these leagues would be awarded a 4.00 average. There were a number of line-up changes for the 2019 season. The Leicester Lions and Somerset Rebels dropped down from the SGB Premiership after the 2018 season.

Locations of the 2019 SGB Championship teams

== League table ==
Final Table Up To And Including Friday 4 October

| Pos. | Club | M | Home | | | Away | | | | | F | A | Pts | +/− |
| Pos. | Club | M | W | D | L | 4W | 3W | D | 1L | L | F | A | Pts | +/− |
|---|---|---|---|---|---|---|---|---|---|---|---|---|---|---|
| 1 | Leicester Lions | 20 | 10 | 0 | 0 | 1 | 4 | 0 | 3 | 2 | 961 | 816 | 50 | +145 |
| 2 | Glasgow Tigers | 20 | 9 | 0 | 1 | 1 | 5 | 0 | 1 | 2 | 945 | 818 | 48 | +127 |
| 3 | Redcar Bears | 20 | 8 | 0 | 2 | 1 | 2 | 0 | 2 | 5 | 917 | 858 | 36 | +57 |
| 4 | Somerset Rebels | 20 | 8 | 0 | 2 | 1 | 2 | 0 | 2 | 5 | 912 | 880 | 36 | +32 |
| 5 | Berwick Bandits | 20 | 9 | 0 | 1 | 0 | 0 | 0 | 3 | 6 | 884 | 912 | 30 | -28 |
| 6 | Sheffield Tigers | 20 | 8 | 0 | 1 | 0 | 0 | 0 | 2 | 6 | 878 | 921 | 30 | -43 |
| 7 | Scunthorpe Scorpions | 20 | 6 | 1 | 3 | 1 | 1 | 1 | 1 | 6 | 899 | 898 | 29 | +1 |
| 8 | Edinburgh Monarchs | 20 | 9 | 0 | 1 | 0 | 0 | 0 | 1 | 9 | 887 | 890 | 28 | -3 |
| 9 | Eastbourne Eagles | 20 | 8 | 0 | 2 | 0 | 1 | 0 | 0 | 8 | 862 | 891 | 27 | -29 |
| 10 | Newcastle Diamonds | 20 | 7 | 0 | 3 | 0 | 0 | 0 | 1 | 9 | 852 | 913 | 22 | -59 |
| 11 | Birmingham Brummies | 20 | 5 | 1 | 4 | 0 | 0 | 1 | 0 | 9 | 782 | 982 | 18 | -200 |

== Results ==
Teams face each other two times: once home and once away.

| Home \ Away | BER | BRM | EAS | EDB | GLA | LEI | NEW | RED | SCU | SHF | SOM |
|---|---|---|---|---|---|---|---|---|---|---|---|
| Berwick Bandits | | 52–38 | 58–32 | 60–30 | 48–41 | 50–40 | 53–34 | 43–47 | 49–41 | 46–44 | 55–35 |
| Birmingham Brummies | 46–44 | | 51–39 | 48–36 | 41–49 | 35–55 | 49–41 | 37–53 | 45–45 | 46–44 | 43–47 |
| Eastbourne Eagles | 65–25 | 37–23 | | 54–36 | 44–45 | 44–45 | 59–31 | 50–40 | 56–34 | 46–44 | 45–44 |
| Edinburgh Monarchs | 52–38 | 60–30 | 51–27 | | 43–45 | 45–44 | 54–36 | 49–41 | 53–37 | 58–32 | 57–32 |
| Glasgow Tigers | 61–29 | 62–28 | 56–33 | 55–35 | | 47–41 | 36–24 | 48–42 | 37–53 | 51–39 | 48–42 |
| Leicester Lions | 54–36 | 58–32 | 53–37 | 47–42 | 46–44 | | 53–37 | 40–32 | 58–32 | 53–37 | 51–39 |
| Newcastle Diamonds | 53–37 | 54–36 | 43–47 | 51–39 | 47–42 | 44–46 | | 49–40 | 54–36 | 52–38 | 44–46 |
| Redcar Bears | 48–42 | 51–39 | 53–37 | 53–37 | 44–46 | 48–42 | 53–37 | | 43–47 | 53–37 | 46–38 |
| Scunthorpe Scorpions | 56–34 | 45–45 | 54–35 | 56–34 | 44–46 | 40–49 | 52–38 | 47–43 | | 55–35 | 40–50 |
| Sheffield Tigers | 46–44 | 55–35 | 51–39 | 49–41 | 53–37 | 46–44 | 48–42 | 42–48 | 45–44 | | 52–38 |
| Somerset Rebels | 49–41 | 55–35 | 54–36 | 55–35 | 42–48 | 42–48 | 49–41 | 51–39 | 55–35 | 49–41 | |

Legend: Blue = home team win; Yellow = draw; Red = away team win.

=== Play-offs ===
**Semi-finals**
**Leicester Lions** | 41 | **50** | 91
Redcar Bears | **49** | 40 | 89
**Glasgow Tigers** | **51** | 42 | 93
Somerset Rebels | 39 | **48** | 87

**Grand Final**
**Leicester Lions** | **51** | 40 | 91
Glasgow Tigers | 39 | **50** | 89

Home team scores are in bold
Overall aggregate scores are in red

=== Semi-finals ===
4 October

Redcar Bears | 41–49 | Leicester Lions | Media Prima Arena; Referee(s): Peter Clarke

12 October

Leicester Lions | 50–40 | Redcar Bears | Paul Chapman & Sons Arena; Referee(s): Phil Griffin

1 October

Glasgow Tigers | 51–39 | Somerset Rebels | The Peugeot Ashfield Stadium; Referee(s): Malcolm Breckon

2 October

Somerset Rebels | 48–42 | Glasgow Tigers | Oak Tree Arena; Referee(s): Chris Durno

=== Grand final ===
19 October

Leicester Lions; Richard Lawson (guest) 11; Ellis Perks 9 Ryan Douglas 8 Scott Nicholls 7 Ty Proctor 7 Connor Mountain 7 Joe Lawlor 2 | 51–39 | Glasgow Tigers; Rasmus Jensen 15; Claus Vissing 8 Craig Cook 6 Mikkel B Andersen 4 Sam Jensen 4 Connor Bailey 2 Kyle Bickley 0 | Paul Chapman & Sons Arena; Referee(s): Ronnie Allan

22 October

Glasgow Tigers; Claus Vissing 14; Craig Cook 14; Kyle Bickley 9 Rasmus Jensen 8 Mikkel B Andersen 2 Sam Jensen 2 Connor Bailey 1 | 50–40 | Leicester Lions; Ellis Perks 11; Ty Proctor 7 Scott Nicholls 6 Ryan Douglas 5 Steve Worrall (guest) 4 Joe Lawlor 4 Connor Mountain 3 | The Peugeot Ashfield Stadium; Referee(s): Stuart Wilson

== Leading averages ==
| Rider | Team | Average |
|---|---|---|
| (Australia) Sam Masters | Edinburgh | 10.86 |
| (England) Craig Cook | Glasgow | 10.72 |
| (England) Charles Wright | Redcar | 9.60 |
| (England) Chris Harris | Somerset | 9.37 |
| (Australia) Rory Schlein | Somerset | 9.37 |
| (England) Edward Kennett | Eastbourne | 9.32 |
| (England) Scott Nicholls | Leicester | 9.23 |
| (Denmark) Rasmus Jensen | Glasgow | 9.05 |
| (Germany) Erik Riss | Redcar | 9.00 |
| (England) Richard Lawson | Eastbourne | 8.83 |

== Knockout Cup ==
The 2019 SGB Championship Knockout Cup was the 52nd edition of the Knockout Cup for tier two teams.

=== KO Cup stages ===
**Preliminary rounds**
**Eastbourne Eagles** | **57** | 40 | 97
Birmingham Brummies | 32 | **50** | 82
Sheffield Tigers | **45** | 36 | 81
**Glasgow Tigers** | 45 | **54** | 99
**Redcar Bears** | **53** | 44 | 97
Somerset Rebels | 36 | **46** | 82

**Quarter-finals**
**Edinburgh Monarchs** | 41 | **67** | 108
Scunthorpe Scorpions | **49** | 23 | 72
**Newcastle Diamonds** | 42 | **57** | 99
Berwick Bandits | **48** | 33 | 81
Leicester Lions | 33 | **55** | 88
**Eastbourne Eagles** | **57** | 35 | 92
Glasgow Tigers | 39 | **46** | 85
**Redcar Bears** | **51** | 44 | 95

**Semi-finals**
Edinburgh Monarchs | **52** | 34 | 86
**Newcastle Diamonds** | 38 | **56** | 94
Eastbourne Eagles | 40 | **48** | 88
**Redcar Bears** | **50** | 42 | 92

**Final**
Newcastle Diamonds | 39 | **47** | 86
**Redcar Bears** | **51** | 43 | 94

Home team scores are in bold
Overall aggregate scores are in red

Round 1

19 April

Eastbourne Eagles | 57–32 | Birmingham Brummies | Arlington Stadium; Referee(s): Paul Carrington

29 May

Birmingham Brummies | 50–40 | Eastbourne Eagles | Perry Barr Stadium; Referee(s): Christina Turnball

10 May

Redcar Bears | 53–36 | Somerset Rebels | Media Prima Arena; Referee(s): Craig Ackroyd

15 May

Somerset Rebels | 46–44 | Redcar Bears | Oak Tree Arena; Referee(s): Ronnie Allan

12 May

Sheffield Tigers | 45–45 | Glasgow Tigers | Owlerton Stadium; Referee(s): Jim McGregor

28 May

Glasgow Tigers | 54–36 | Sheffield Tigers | The Peugeot Ashfield Stadium; Referee(s): Jim McGregor

Quarter-finals

14 April

Scunthorpe Scorpions | 49–41 | Edinburgh Monarchs | Eddie Wright Raceway; Referee(s): Peter Griffin

11 May

Edinburgh Monarchs | 67–23 | Scunthorpe Scorpions | Lothian Arena; Referee(s): Willie Dishington

1 June

Berwick Bandits | 48–42 | Newcastle Diamonds | Sheffield Park; Referee(s): Willie Dishington

2 June

Newcastle Diamonds | 57–33 | Berwick Bandits | Newcastle Greyhound Stadium; Referee(s): Graeme Hunter

30 June

Eastbourne Eagles | 57–33 | Leicester Lions | Arlington Stadium; Referee(s): Ronnie Allen

5 July

Leicester Lions | 55–35 | Eastbourne Eagles | Paul Chapman & Sons Arena; Referee(s): Darren Hartley

2 July

Redcar Bears | 51–39 | Glasgow Tigers | Media Prima Arena; Referee(s): Peter Clarke

5 July

Glasgow Tigers | 46–44 | Redcar Bears | The Peugeot Ashfield Stadium; Referee(s): Craig Ackroyd

Semi-finals

12 July

Edinburgh Monarchs | 52–38 | Newcastle Diamonds | Lothian Arena; Referee(s): Darren Hartley

14 July

Newcastle Diamonds | 56–34 | Edinburgh Monarchs | Newcastle Greyhound Stadium; Referee(s): Richard Breckon

6 September

Redcar Bears | 50–40 | Eastbourne Eagles | Media Prima Arena; Referee(s): Phil Griffin

7 September

Eastbourne Eagles | 48–42 | Redcar Bears | Arlington Stadium; Referee(s): Christina Turnball

=== Grand final ===
11 October

Redcar Bears; Erik Riss 13; Charles Wright 12; Jake Allen 10; Jordan Stewart 6 Kasper Andersen 5 Nathan Greaves 5 Tom Woolley 0 | 51–39 | Newcastle Diamonds; Lasse Bjerre 9 Ulrich Østergaard 9 Steve Worrall 8 Matthew Wethers 8 Danny Phillips 3 Max Clegg 2 Thomas Jørgensen R/R | Media Prima Arena; Referee(s): Stuart Wilson

27 October

Newcastle Diamonds; Max Clegg 14; Ulrich Østergaard 10; Steve Worrall 9 Matthew Wethers 8 James Sarjeant 6 Danny Phillips 0 Thomas Jørgensen R/R | 47–43 | Redcar Bears; Erik Riss 14; Jordan Stewart 9 Charles Wright 7 Kasper Andersen 5 Ben Barker 4 Nathan Greaves 3 Tom Woolley 1 | Newcastle Greyhound Stadium; Referee(s): Willie Dishington

== Championship Shield ==
Extended content

**Borders Group**

| Home \ Away | BER | EDB | GLA | NEW |
|---|---|---|---|---|
| Berwick Bandits | | 54–36 | 52–38 | 52–38 |
| Edinburgh Monarchs | 45–44 | | 43–47 | 51–39 |
| Glasgow Tigers | 56–34 | 53–37 | | 51–39 |
| Newcastle Diamonds | 39–51 | 50–40 | 44–46 | |

Legend: Blue = home team win; Yellow = draw; Red = away team win.

**Borders Group Table**
Final Table Up To And Including Friday 24 May

| Pos. | Club | M | Home | | | Away | | | | | F | A | Pts | +/− |
| Pos. | Club | M | W | D | L | 4W | 3W | D | 1L | L | F | A | Pts | +/− |
|---|---|---|---|---|---|---|---|---|---|---|---|---|---|---|
| 1 | Glasgow Tigers | 6 | 3 | 0 | 0 | 0 | 2 | 0 | 0 | 1 | 291 | 249 | **15** | +42 |
| 2 | Berwick Bandits | 6 | 3 | 0 | 0 | 1 | 0 | 0 | 1 | 1 | 287 | 252 | **14** | +35 |
| 3 | Edinburgh Monarchs | 6 | 2 | 0 | 1 | 0 | 0 | 0 | 0 | 3 | 252 | 287 | **6** | -35 |
| 4 | Newcastle Diamonds | 6 | 1 | 0 | 2 | 0 | 0 | 0 | 0 | 3 | 249 | 291 | **3** | -42 |

**Northern Group**

| Home \ Away | LEI | RED | SCU | SHF |
|---|---|---|---|---|
| Leicester Lions | | 57–33 | 62–28 | 47–41 |
| Redcar Bears | 41–49 | | 52–38 | 49–39 |
| Scunthorpe Scorpions | 48–42 | 49–41 | | 50–40 |
| Sheffield Tigers | 43–47 | 56–34 | 49–41 | |

Legend: Blue = home team win; Yellow = draw; Red = away team win.

**Northern Group Table**
Final Table Up To And Including Friday 3 May

| Pos. | Club | M | Home | | | Away | | | | | F | A | Pts | +/− |
| Pos. | Club | M | W | D | L | 4W | 3W | D | 1L | L | F | A | Pts | +/− |
|---|---|---|---|---|---|---|---|---|---|---|---|---|---|---|
| 1 | Leicester Lions | 6 | 3 | 0 | 0 | 1 | 1 | 0 | 1 | 0 | 304 | 234 | **17** | +70 |
| 2 | Scunthorpe Scorpions | 6 | 3 | 0 | 0 | 0 | 0 | 0 | 0 | 3 | 254 | 296 | **9** | -32 |
| 3 | Sheffield Tigers | 6 | 2 | 0 | 1 | 0 | 0 | 0 | 1 | 2 | 268 | 268 | **7** | = |
| 4 | Redcar Bears | 6 | 2 | 0 | 1 | 0 | 0 | 0 | 0 | 3 | 250 | 288 | **6** | -38 |

**Southern Group**

| Home \ Away | BRM | EAG | SOM |
|---|---|---|---|
| Birmingham Brummies | | 37–53 | 44–46 |
| Eastbourne Eagles | 52–38 | | 63–27 |
| Somerset Rebels | 52–38 | 52–38 | |

Legend: Blue = home team win; Yellow = draw; Red = away team win.

**Southern Group Table**
Final Table Up To And Including Wednesday 1 May

| Pos. | Club | M | Home | | | Away | | | | | F | A | Pts | +/− |
| Pos. | Club | M | W | D | L | 4W | 3W | D | 1L | L | F | A | Pts | +/− |
|---|---|---|---|---|---|---|---|---|---|---|---|---|---|---|
| 1 | Eastbourne Eagles | 4 | 2 | 0 | 0 | 0 | 1 | 0 | 0 | 1 | 206 | 154 | **10** | +52 |
| 2 | Somerset Rebels | 4 | 2 | 0 | 0 | 0 | 0 | 1 | 0 | 1 | 177 | 183 | **6** | -6 |
| 3 | Birmingham Brummies | 4 | 0 | 2 | 0 | 0 | 0 | 0 | 0 | 2 | 157 | 203 | **0** | -46 |

**Play-offs**

**Semi-finals**
Berwick Bandits | 36 | **42** | 78
**Leicester Lions** | **54** | 48 | 102
Glasgow Tigers | **47** | 34 | 81
**Eastbourne Eagles** | 43 | **55** | 98

**Grand Final**
Leicester Lions | 48 | **55** | 103
Eastbourne Eagles | **42** | 34 | 76

Home team scores are in **bold**
Overall aggregate scores are in red
The best second place team from the three qualifying group stage also qualified for the semi-finals.

**Semi-finals**

16 June

Leicester Lions | 54–36 | Berwick Bandits | Paul Chapman & Sons Arena; Referee(s): Tony Steele

22 June

Berwick Bandits | 42–48 | Leicester Lions | Sheffield Park; Referee(s): Jim McGregor

23 July

Glasgow Tigers | 47–43 | Eastbourne Eagles | The Peugeot Ashfield Stadium; Referee(s): Willie Dishington

3 August

Eastbourne Eagles | 55–34 | Glasgow Tigers | Arlington Stadium; Referee(s): Seth Perkin

**Grand final**

14 September

Eastbourne Eagles | 42–48 | Leicester Lions | Arlington Stadium; Referee(s): Paul Carrington

15 September

Leicester Lions | 55–34 | Eastbourne Eagles | Paul Chapman & Sons Arena; Referee(s): Michael Breckon

== Riders Championship ==
Extended content

Erik Riss won the Riders' Championship. The final was held on 1 September at Owlerton Stadium.

| Pos. | Rider | Pts | Total | SF | Final |
|---|---|---|---|---|---|
| 1 | (Germany) Erik Riss | 3 1 3 3 2 | 12 | 3 | 3 |
| 2 | (England) Danny King | 1 2 3 1 3 | 10 | 2 | 2 |
| 3 | (Australia) Ryan Douglas | 3 2 3 3 1 | 12 | - | 1 |
| 4 | (Australia) Sam Masters | 3 3 1 3 2 | 12 | - | 0 |
| 5 | (Australia) Jake Allen | 2 2 1 2 3 | 10 | 1 | |
| 6 | (England) Adam Ellis | 3 1 2 3 0 | 9 | 0 | |
| 7 | (England) Richard Lawson | 2 3 2 1 1 | 9 | | |
| 8 | (England) Chris Harris | 2 3 2 2 0 | 9 | | |
| 9 | (Denmark) Rasmus Jensen | 0 0 3 2 3 | 8 | | |
| 10 | (Australia) Todd Kurtz | 1 0 1 1 3 | 6 | | |
| 11 | (Australia) Nick Morris | 1 3 FX 2 R | 6 | | |
| 12 | (Australia) Zaine Kennedy | 0 1 2 1 1 | 5 | | |
| 13 | (England) Steve Worrall | 1 1 1 R 2 | 5 | | |
| 14 | (Australia) Jye Etheridge | 0 2 0 0 2 | 4 | | |
| 15 | (England) Josh Auty | 2 FX 0 NS NS | 2 | | |
| 16 | (England) Joe Lawlor (res) | 0 1 | 1 | | |
| 17 | (England) Craig Cook | R R R NS NS | 0 | | |
| 18 | (England) Tom Woolley (res) | 0 0 | 0 | | |

- f=fell, r-retired, ex=excluded, ef=engine failure t=touched tapes

The following did not partake in the meeting even though they had qualified
Edward Kennett (Eastbourne Eagles), Scott Nicholls (Leicester Lions), Charles Wright (Redcar Bears)

Referee's Official Group Stage Result Score Sheet

== Pairs ==
Extended content

The SGB Championship Pairs was held at Oaktree Arena on 20 September. The event was won by Glasgow Tigers.

Qualifying
| Pos | Team | Pts | Riders |
|---|---|---|---|
| 1 | Glasgow | 25 | Jensen 13, Cook 12 |
| 2 | Birmingham | 22 | Ellis 13, Aarnio 9 |
| 3 | Leicester | 21 | Douglas 12, Nicholls 9 |
| 4 | Sheffield | 20 | King 14, Howarth 6 |
| 5 | Scunthorpe | 20 | Allen 13, Barker 7 |
| 6 | Redcar | 19 | Stewart 13, Riss 6 |

Qualifying
| Pos | Team | Pts | Riders |
|---|---|---|---|
| 7 | Eastbourne | 18 | Lawson 12, Kerr 6 |
| 8 | Newcastle | 15 | Worrall S 12, Bjerre 3 |
| 9 | Somerset | 15 | Morris 8, Schlein 7 |
| 10 | Edinburgh | 13 | Wells 8, Heeps 5 |
| 11 | Berwick | 10 | Jonassen 10, Etheridge 0 |

Semi finals

- Glasgow bt Sheffield 7–2
- Leicester bt Birmingham 5–4

Final

- Glasgow bt Leicester 6–3

== Fours ==
Extended content

Somerset Rebels won the SGB Championship Fours, held on 23 June 2019, at the East of England Arena.

Qualifying
| Pos | Team | Pts | Riders |
|---|---|---|---|
| 1 | Eastbourne | 15 | Kennett 6, Kerr 6, Lawson 2, Newman 1 |
| 2 | Glasgow | 15 | Jensen 6, Starke 5, Cook 3, Vissing 1 |
| 3 | Sheffield | 15 | Proctor 6, King 4, Howarth 3, Kemp 1, Nicol 1 |
| 4 | Somerset | 14 | Harris 6, Covatti 4, Schlein 3, Kurtz 1 |
| 5 | Edinburgh | 13 | Andersson5, Heeps 5, Palovaara 2, Wells 1 |
| 6 | Leicester | 12 | Worrall 4, Douglas 4, Nicholls 2, Bates 2 |

Qualifying (cont)
| Pos | Team | Pts | Riders |
|---|---|---|---|
| 7 | Newcastle | 11 | Worrall 5, Jorgensen 4, Wethers 2, Bjerre 0 |
| 8 | Redcar | 10 | Wright 5, Palm Toft 4, Stewart 1, Greaves 0, Bacon 0 |
| 9 | Scunthorpe | 10 | Ayres 3, Auty 3, Allen 2, Nielsen 2 |
| 10 | Berwick | 9 | Doolan 3, Summers 2, Jakobsen 2, Garcia 2, Etheridge 0 |
| 11 | Birmingham | 8 | Aarnio 4, Ellis 3, Coles 1, Lawlor 0 |

Final
| Pos | Team | Pts | Riders |
|---|---|---|---|
| 1 | Somerset | 22 | Covatti 8, Harris 7, Schlein 6, Kurtz 1 |
| 2 | Glasgow | 19 | Cook 9, Jensen 5, Starke 4, Vissing 1 |
| 3 | Sheffield | 19 | King 7, Proctor 4, Nicol 4, Howarth 4, Kemp 0 |
| 4 | Eastbourne | 12 | Lawson 6, Kennett 4, Kerr 2, Newman 0 |

King beat Cook (who fell) in a run off for second place.

== Teams and final averages ==
Berwick Bandits

- (Australia) Aaron Summers 8.09
- (Denmark) Nikolaj Busk Jakobsen 7.82
- (Australia) Jye Etheridge 7.63
- (Australia) Kevin Doolan 7.67
- (Austria) Dany Gappmaier 6.81
- (Sweden) Thomas H. Jonasson 6.32
- (Argentina) Coty Garcia 5.71
- (England) Leon Flint 4.33

27 August Thomas H. Jonasson replaced the injured Nikolaj Busk Jakobsen in the Berwick Bandits team

Birmingham Brummies

- (England) Adam Ellis 8.50
- (England) Ashley Morris 7.60
- (England) Jason Garrity 7.19
- (England) Zach Wajtknecht 6.67
- (Finland) Tero Aarnio 6.24
- (England) Ulrich Østergaard 6.00
- (Italy) Michele Paco Castagna 5.84
- (England) Kyle Newman 4.36
- (England) Tom Perry 4.00
- (England) David Wallinger 4.00
- (Denmark) Tobias Thomsen 3.43
- (Wales) Nathan Stoneman 3.27
- (England) Danyon Hume 3.23
- (Denmark) Nick Agertoft 2.81
- (England) Jordan Jenkins 1.33

7 May Adam Ellis and Nathan Stoneman replaced Kyle Newman and Tobias Thomsen in the Birmingham Brummies team
31 May Tero Aarnio replaced Ulrich Østergaard in the Birmingham Brummies team
1 July Nick Agertoft replaced the retired Zach Wajtknecht and Danyon Hume replaced Nathan Stoneman in the Birmingham Brummies team
23 July Jason Garrity replaced the injured Nick Morris and David Wallinger replaced Danyon Hume in the Birmingham Brummies team
4 August Jordan Jenkins replaced David Wallinger in the Birmingham Brummies team
26 August Tom Perry replaced Jordan Jenkins who quit the Birmingham Brummies team

Eastbourne Eagles

- (England) Edward Kennett 9.32
- (England) Richard Lawson 8.83
- (England) Lewis Kerr 8.23
- (England) Tom Brennan 6.59
- (England) Kyle Newman 6.26
- (England) Ben Morley 5.36
- (England) Georgie Wood 4.37
- (England) Alfie Bowtell 3.95
- (England) Jason Edwards 3.38

21 May Kyle Newman replaced the injured Tom Brennan in the Eastbourne Eagles team
17 July Jason Edwards replaced Ben Morley in the Eastbourne Eagles team

Edinburgh Monarchs

- (Australia) Sam Masters 10.86
- (United States) Ricky Wells 8.40
- (Australia) Josh Pickering 7.82
- (Australia) Cameron Heeps 7.58
- (Finland) Victor Palovaara 6.72
- (Sweden) Joel Andersson 6.20
- (Australia) Justin Sedgmen 5.52
- (England) James Sarjeant 5.13
- (Scotland) William Lawson 4.46
- (England) Luke Ruddick 3.54
- (Australia) Matt Marson 3.33

30 May Victor Palovaara replaced the injured Justin Sedgmen in the Edinburgh Monarchs team
15 July Sam Masters and Matt Marson replaced Victor Palovaara and Joel Andersson in the Edinburgh Monarchs team
1 August James Sarjeant replaced Matt Marson in the Edinburgh Monarchs team

Glasgow Tigers

- (England) Craig Cook 10.72
- (Denmark) Rasmus Jensen 9.05
- (Denmark) Claus Vissing 8.72
- (England) Paul Starke 7.19
- (Denmark) Sam Jensen 5.37
- (England) James Sarjeant 4.89
- (England) Kyle Bickley 4.54
- (Australia) Connor Bailey 3.72
- (Denmark) Mikkel B. Andersen 2.52
- (England) Luke Chessell 0.33

22 February Kyle Bickley replaced Joe Lawlor in the Glasgow Tigers team
25 May Connor Bailey replaced Luke Chessell in the Glasgow Tigers team
1 August Mikkel B. Andersen replaced James Sarjeant in the Glasgow Tigers team
6 August Sam Jensen replaced the injured Paul Starke in the Glasgow Tigers team

Leicester Lions

- (England) Scott Nicholls 9.23
- (Australia) Ryan Douglas 8.82
- (England) Richie Worrall 8.81
- (Australia) Ty Proctor 7.43
- (England) Josh Bates 7.30
- (England) Ellis Perks 7.15
- (England) Connor Mountain 6.25
- (England) Jack Thomas 3.35
- (England) Joe Lawlor 2.50

10 July Joe Lawlor replaced Jack Thomas in the Leicester Lions team
1 August Ty Proctor replaced the injured Josh Bates in the Leicester Lions team

Newcastle Diamonds

- (England) Steve Worrall 8.33
- (Australia) Matthew Wethers 7.60
- (Denmark) Ulrich Østergaard 6.94
- (Denmark) Lasse Bjerre 6.93
- (Denmark) Thomas Jørgensen 6.64
- (England) Max Clegg 5.57
- (England) Simon Lambert 3.41
- (Denmark) Jacob Bukhave 3.06
- (England) Danny Phillips 2.67

4 March Steve Worrall replaced Nike Lunna in the Newcastle Diamonds team, with them also releasing Victor Palovaara
5 March Simon Lambert was signed to replace Victor Palovaara
29 May Jacob Bukhave replaced Simon Lambert
10 July Ulrich Østergaard replaced Jacob Bukhave

Redcar Bears

- (England) Charles Wright 9.60
- (Germany) Erik Riss 9.00
- (Denmark) Michael Palm Toft 7.89
- (England) Ben Barker 6.80
- (Australia) Jordan Stewart 6.31
- (Denmark) Kasper Andersen 5.79
- (Denmark) Ulrich Østergaard 5.46
- (England) Nathan Greaves 5.41
- (England) Tom Bacon 4.48
- (England) Jack Smith 4.18
- (England) Tom Woolley 1.65

3 June Ben Barker was released by the Redcar Bears team
4 June Ulrich Østergaard joined the Redcar Bears team
1 July Erik Riss, Kasper Andersen and Tom Woolley replaced Ulrich Østergaard, Jack Smith and the injured Tom Bacon in the Redcar Bears team

Scunthorpe Scorpions

- (England) Josh Auty 8.13
- (England) Jason Garrity 7.88
- (Australia) Jake Allen 7.81
- (England) Ben Barker 7.39
- (England) Danny Ayres 6.54
- (England) Simon Lambert 6.02
- (Denmark) Stefan Nielsen 5.57
- (England) Ryan Kinsley 3.52
- (England) Josh Bailey 3.50
- (Australia) Jedd List 1.09

8 April Danny Ayres replaced Jedd List in the Scunthorpe Scorpions team
29 June Simon Lambert and Ben Barker replaced Josh Bailey and the injured Jason Garrity in the Scunthorpe Scorpions team

Sheffield Tigers

- (England) Danny King 8.82
- (Australia) Ty Proctor 7.81
- (England) Kyle Howarth 7.70
- (United States) Broc Nicol 6.41
- (Australia) Justin Sedgmen 6.03
- (Australia) Todd Kurtz 5.70
- (Australia) Zaine Kennedy 4.95
- (Australia) Josh MacDonald 4.76
- (Denmark) Kasper Andersen 4.74
- (England) Drew Kemp 4.58

4 June Josh MacDonald replaced Kasper Andersen in the Sheffield Tigers team
31 July Todd Kurtz and Justin Sedgmen replaced Ty Proctor and the injured Broc Nicol in the Sheffield Tigers team
27 August Broc Nicol replaced Drew Kemp in the Sheffield Tigers team

Somerset Rebels

- (Australia) Rory Schlein 9.37
- (England) Chris Harris 9.37
- (Australia) Nick Morris 8.63
- (Italy) Nico Covatti 8.44
- (Germany) Valentin Grobauer 5.86
- (Australia) Todd Kurtz 5.33
- (England) Anders Rowe 4.53
- (England) Henry Atkins 2.91
- (Wales) Nathan Stoneman 2.58
- (England) Luke Harris 0.80

26 July Valentin Grobauer quits racing the Somerset Rebels team
28 July Henry Atkins quits racing the Somerset Rebels team
29 July Nick Morris, Nathan Stoneman and Luke Harris replaced resigned riders Valentin Grobauer, Henry Atkins, and Todd Kurtz in the team

== See also ==
- List of United Kingdom speedway league champions
- Knockout Cup (speedway)
