= SGB Championship 2022 =

British motorcycle speedway season

- League: SGB Championship
- No. of competitors: 10
- Champions: Poole Pirates
- Knockout Cup: Poole Pirates
- Pairs: Redcar Bears
- Riders' Championship: Sam Masters
- Jubilee League: suspended
- Highest average: Sam Masters
- Division/s above: SGB Premiership
- Division/s below: SGB National League

The 2022 SGB Championship season is the 75th season of the second tier of British Speedway and the 5th known as the SGB Championship.

== Summary ==
Eleven clubs competed in the Championship in 2022, with Oxford returning to the sport after a 15-year absence. The Eastbourne Eagles and the Kent Kings did not compete in the 2022 edition, with the Kings riding in the National Development League as The Royals, and Eastbourne not riding at all.

Alongside the league and Knockout Cup, a new Summer competition was added in form of a group stage before a three team final at Sheffield. The tournament was called 'The Championship Jubilee League' which was eventually suspended until the 2023 season. However the additional fixtures created an issue due to the suspension of fixtures during the Death and state funeral of Elizabeth II and the heavy rain during October. In retrospect an additional event could have been added after the completion of the league and cup fixtures. Poole Pirates dominated the season again and successfully defended their league and knockout cup double crown.

Newcastle Diamonds withdrew from the Championship and closed their doors on June 21. Their results were expunged from the League and they were withdrawn from the Knockout Cup and Jubilee League.

Locations of the 2022 SGB Championship teams

== League ==
=== Regular season ===
League Table

Pos.	Club	M	Home			Away					F	A	Pts	+/−
Pos.	Club	M	W	D	L	4W	3W	D	1L	L	F	A	Pts	+/−
1	Leicester Lions **(SF)**	18	9	0	0	3	2	0	1	3	875	742	46	+133
2	Glasgow Tigers **(SF)**	18	8	1	0	2	2	0	1	4	876	744	40	+132
3	Poole Pirates **(QF)**	18	7	1	1	2	1	2	2	2	866	752	39	+114
4	Plymouth Gladiators **(QF)**	18	8	0	1	0	1	1	3	4	825	793	32	+32
5	Edinburgh Monarchs **(QF)**	18	7	0	2	1	1	0	4	3	806	803	32	+3
6	Redcar Bears **(QF)**	18	7	0	2	1	1	0	2	5	783	829	30	-46
7	Scunthorpe Scorpions	18	8	0	1	0	0	0	2	7	786	832	26	-46
8	Berwick Bandits	18	5	1	3	1	0	0	1	7	810	809	21	+1
9	Oxford Cheetahs	18	4	0	5	0	1	0	2	6	741	878	17	-137
10	Birmingham Brummies	18	4	0	5	0	1	0	1	7	716	902	16	-188

NOTE: Newcastle's results were expunged from the table on 28-06-22 following their withdrawal from the 2022 Championship.

- **(SF)** = Qualification for the League Play-off Semi Finals
- **(QF)** = Qualification for the League Play-off Quarter Finals

Fixtures & Results

Home \ Away	BER	BIR	EDI	GLA	LEI	OXF	PLY	POL	RED	SCU
Berwick		58–32	56–34	42–48	41–49	59–31	59–30	45–45	43–47	57–33
Birmingham	48–42		40–50	33–57	38–52	43–47	46–44	35–55	50–40	49–41
Edinburgh	50–40	52–36		39–51	39–50	48–42	48–42	49–41	48–41	49–41
Glasgow	56–34	56–34	46–44		56–34	53–37	49–41	45–45	57–33	59–31
Leicester	55–35	62–28	47–42	52–38		55–35	48–41	48–42	60–30	62–28
Oxford	40–50	42–48	44–46	46–44	43–47		50–40	42–48	47–43	49–40
Plymouth	49–41	46–44	48–42	54–36	60–30	55–35		53–37	39–51	48–42
Poole	49–41	54–36	49–41	51–39	43–47	58–32	45–45		55–34	55–35
Redcar	53–37	50–40	45–39	44–46	48–42	47–43	48–42	40–50		46–44
Scunthorpe	60–30	54–36	51–39	50–40	55–35	54–36	42–48	45–44	47–43	

Legend: Blue = home team win; Yellow = draw; Red = away team win.

League Scoring System

- Home loss by any number of points = 0
- Home draw = 1
- Home win by any number of points = 3
- Away loss by 7 points or more = 0
- Away loss by 6 points or less = 1
- Away draw = 2
- Away win by between 1 and 6 points = 3
- Away win by 7 points or more = 4

=== Play-offs ===
**Quarter Finals**
3	**Poole Pirates**	**60**	50	110
4	Plymouth Gladiators	30	**40**	70
5	**Edinburgh Monarchs**	**54**	41	95
6	Redcar Bears	36	**49**	85

**Semi Finals**
3	**Poole Pirates**	**60**	50	110
2	Glasgow Tigers	30	**39**	69
5	Edinburgh Monarchs	**36**	37	73
1	**Leicester Lions**	53	**53**	106

**Final**
3	**Poole Pirates**	**49**	52	101
1	Leicester Lions	41	**38**	79

Home team scores are in bold
Overall aggregate scores are in red

=== Grand Final ===
First Leg

26 October

Poole Pirates; Richard Lawson 12; Zach Cook 10; Steve Worrall 9 Danny King 8 Ben Cook 5 Drew Kemp 4 Nathan Ablitt 1	49–41	Leicester Lions; Scott Nicholls (guest) 9 Nick Morris 9 Richie Worrall 8 Connor Mountain 5 Joe Thompson 5 Dan Thompson 4 Max Clegg 1	Poole Stadium; Referee(s): Mick Bates

Second Leg

4 November

Leicester Lions; Nick Morris 7 Connor Mountain 6 Kyle Howarth 6 Richie Worrall 6 Joe Thompson 5 Max Clegg 5 Dan Thompson 3	38–52	Poole Pirates; Richard Lawson 14; Steve Worrall 11; Zach Cook 9 Ben Cook 8 Danny King 8 Drew Kemp 2 Nathan Ablitt 0	Adrian Flux Arena; Referee(s): Jim McGregor

== Knockout Cup ==
The 2022 SGB Championship Knockout Cup was the 54th edition of the Knockout Cup for tier two teams and the 5th edition under the SGB Championship Knockout Cup name.

=== Bracket ===
**Round One**
Newcastle Diamonds	**41**	32	73
**Edinburgh Monarchs**	49	**58**	107
**Glasgow Tigers**
Bye
Oxford Cheetahs	**47**	39	86
**Redcar Bears**	43	**51**	94
**Berwick Bandits**
Bye
**Plymouth Gladiators**
Bye
**Poole Pirates**
Bye
**Leicester Lions**	**64**	30	94
Birmingham Brummies	26	**30**	56
**Scunthorpe Scorpions**
Bye

**Quarter Finals**
**Edinburgh Monarchs**	**53**	37	91
Glasgow Tigers	32	**52**	89
**Redcar Bears**	**51**	56	107
Berwick Bandits	39	**34**	73
Plymouth Gladiators	'**42**	32	74
**Poole Pirates**	48	**58**	106
**Leicester Lions**	**58**	45	101
Scunthorpe Scorpions	32	**45**	77

**Semi Finals**
Edinburgh Monarchs	**47**	35	83
**Redcar Bears**	43	**54**	97
**Poole Pirates**	44	**60**	104
Leicester Lions	**46**	30	76

**Final**
Redcar Bears	**41**	38	79
**Poole Pirates**	48	**52**	100

Home team scores are in bold
Overall aggregate scores are in red

=== Final ===
First Leg

7 October

Redcar Bears; Charles Wright 14; Erik Riss 9 Kyle Newman 9 Lewis Kerr 7 Kasper Andersen 2 Jordan Jenkins 2 Jason Edwards 1	41–48	Poole Pirates; Danny King 11; Ben Cook 11; Zach Cook 8 Richard Lawson 7 Steve Worrall 5 Nathan Ablitt 3 Drew Kemp 2	Ecco Arena

Second Leg

12 October

Poole Pirates; Richard Lawson 13; Ben Cook 9 Zach Cook 9 Steve Worrall 9 Danny King 6 Drew Kemp 6 Nathan Ablitt 0	52–38	Redcar Bears; Erik Riss 11; Lewis Kerr 6 Kyle Newman 6 Kasper Andersen 4 Jason Edwards 4 Jordan Jenkins 4 Kye Thomson (guest) 3	Poole Stadium

== Jubilee League ==
The three group winners were supposed to have met in a three-leg final, with each side hosting a leg. However, following the death of the Queen, the competition was initially suspended and then following fixture congestion and weather problems it was decided to hold the final the following season. The decision to hold the final seemed odd because Glasgow had pulled out and Leicester had moved leagues. It was eventually cancelled.

=== Group stage ===
Scottish Group

Fixtures

Home \ Away	BER	EDB	GLA
Berwick Bandits		44–46	41–46
Edinburgh Monarchs	51–39		50–40
Glasgow Tigers	65–25	53–37	

Legend: Blue = home team win; Yellow = draw; Red = away team win.

Table

Pos.	Club	M	Home			Away					F	A	Pts	+/−
Pos.	Club	M	W	D	L	4W	3W	D	1L	L	F	A	Pts	+/−
1	Glasgow Tigers (Q)	4	2	0	0	0	1	0	0	1	204	153	9	+51
2	Edinburgh Monarchs	4	2	0	0	0	1	0	0	1	184	176	9	+8
3	Berwick Bandits	4	0	0	2	0	0	0	0	2	149	208	0	-49

Northern Group

Fixtures

Home \ Away	LEI	RED	SCU
Leicester Lions		51–39	56–34
Redcar Bears	51–39		47–43
Scunthorpe Scorpions	46–44	50–40	

Legend: Blue = home team win; Yellow = draw; Red = away team win.

Table

Pos.	Club	M	Home			Away					F	A	Pts	+/−
Pos.	Club	M	W	D	L	4W	3W	D	1L	L	F	A	Pts	+/−
1	Leicester Lions (Q)	4	2	0	0	0	0	0	1	1	190	170	7	+20
2	Scunthorpe Scorpions	4	2	0	0	0	0	0	1	1	173	187	7	-14
3	Redcar Bears	4	2	0	0	0	0	0	0	2	177	183	6	-6

Southern Group

Fixtures

Home \ Away	BRM	OXF	PLY	POL
Birmingham Brummies		46–44	52–38	34–56
Oxford Cheetahs	56–34		56–34	45–45
Plymouth Gladiators	57–32	45–45		39–51
Poole Pirates	59–31	48–42	62–28	

Legend: Blue = home team win; Yellow = draw; Red = away team win.

Table

Pos.	Club	M	Home			Away					F	A	Pts	+/−
Pos.	Club	M	W	D	L	4W	3W	D	1L	L	F	A	Pts	+/−
1	Poole Pirates (Q)	6	3	0	0	2	0	1	0	0	321	219	19	+102
2	Oxford Cheetahs	6	2	1	0	0	0	1	2	0	288	252	11	+36
3	Birmingham Brummies	6	2	0	1	0	0	0	0	3	229	310	6	-81
4	Plymouth Gladiators	6	1	1	1	0	0	0	0	3	241	298	4	-57

== Pairs Championship ==
The 2022 edition of the SGB Championship Pairs Championship took place on Friday 12 August, at Oxford Stadium, Oxford.

Result

Group A
Pos	Club	Riders	Pts
1st	Leicester (Q)	Richie Worrall & Nick Morris	26
2nd	Glasgow (Q)	Benjamin Basso & Danyon Hume	21
3rd	Scunthorpe	James Wright & Simon Lambert	16
4th	Edinburgh	Paco Castagna & Kye Thomsen	15
5th	Birmingham	Justin Sedgman & James Pearson	12

Group B
Pos	Club	Riders	Pts
1st	Redcar (Q)	Charles Wright & Lewis Kerr	25
2nd	Poole (Q)	Steve Worrall & Danny King	22
3rd	Berwick	Chris Harris & Jye Etheridge	22
4th	Oxford	Scott Nicholls & Aaron Summers	13
5th	Plymouth	Adam Roynon & Ben Morley	8

Semi Finals

Team One	Team Two	Score	Result
Poole	Leicester	6-3	S.Worrall, Morris, King, R.Worrall
Redcar	Glasgow	5-4	Basso, Wright, Kerr, Hume

Final

Team One	Team Two	Score	Result
Redcar	Poole	7-2	Wright, Kerr, King, Worrall (R)

== Riders Championship ==
The 2022 edition of the SGB Championship Riders Championship took place on Wednesday 24 August, at Poole Stadium, Poole.

Placing	Rider	Total	1	2	3	4	5	6	7	8	9	10	11	12	13	14	15	16	17	18	19	20	Pts	Pos	21	22
1	(Australia) (12) Sam Masters (EDI)	12			3					1		3			2						3		12	1	-	1st
2	(England) (6) Danny King (PP)	10		3				3			0							2			2		10	2	1st	2nd
3	(England) (3) Lewis Kerr (RED)	10	3						2				1				3				1		10	4	2nd	3rd
4	(Australia) (4) Ryan Douglas (SS)	12	2							2				3				3				2	12	2	-	4th
5	(England) (8) Richard Lawson (PP)	10		1						3			2			2			2				10	6	3rd	-
6	(Australia) (5) Nick Morris (LEI)	10		2			3					1					1					3	10	5	4th	-
7	(Australia) (15) Josh Pickering (EDI)	9				1			3			2						0	3				9	7	-	-
8	(England) (11) Charles Wright (RED)	9			2				1		2					3						1	9	8	-	-
9	(England) (9) Scott Nicholls (OXF)	9			1		2						3					1		2			9	9	-	-
10	(England) (7) Chris Harris (BER)	7		0					0					1	3					3			7	10	-	-
11	(England) (16) Kyle Howarth (LEI)	7				3				0	3						0			1			7	11	-	-
12	(Australia) (13) Troy Batchelor (OXF)	6				2	1							2		1					0		6	12	-	-
13	(Australia) (10) Justin Sedgmen (BIR)	4			0			2						0			2		0				4	13	-	-
14	(Australia) (17) Ben Cook (PP)	2									1								1				2	14		
15	(England) (14) Tom Brennan (GLA)	1				0		1					0		0							0	1	15	-	-
16	(Denmark) (1) Michael Palm Toft (PLY)	1	1				0				-				-				-				1	16	-	-
17	(Australia) (18) Zach Cook (PP)	1													1								1	17		
18	(England) (2) Leon Flint (BER)	0	0					0				0				0				0			0	18	-	-
Placing	Rider	Total	1	2	3	4	5	6	7	8	9	10	11	12	13	14	15	16	17	18	19	20	Pts	Pos	21	22

m - exclusion for exceeding two minute time allowance • t - exclusion for touching the tapes • x - other exclusion • e - retired or mechanical failure • f - fell • ns - non-starter • nc - non-classify

gate A - inside	gate B	gate C	gate D - outside

== Leading averages ==
Final Averages - SGB Championship, Knockout Cup, Jubilee League and Play-Off Matches only.

	Rider	Team	Average
1	(Australia) Sam Masters	Edinburgh	10.15
2	(England) Richard Lawson	Poole	9.92
3	(Australia) Ryan Douglas	Scunthorpe	9.85
4	(Australia) Josh Pickering	Edinburgh	9.34
5	(England) Danny King	Poole	9.08
6	(Australia) Nick Morris	Leicester	9.06
7	(England) Kyle Howarth	Leicester	9.02
=8	(England) Chris Harris	Berwick	8.98
=8	(England) Craig Cook	Glasgow	8.98
=8	(England) Steve Worrall	Poole	8.98

== Squads & final averages ==
=== Berwick Bandits ===
- (England) Chris Harris (C) 8.98
- (England) Leon Flint 7.05
- (England) Jye Etheridge 6.76
- (United States) Ricky Wells 6.61
- (Denmark) Jonas Knudsen 6.59
- (Netherlands) Theo Pijper 5.52
- (Australia) Ty Proctor 4.97
- (Wales) Nathan Stoneman 2.63
- (Scotland) Greg Blair 2.22

=== Birmingham Brummies ===
- (England) Adam Ellis 8.13
- (Australia) Justin Sedgmen 7.34
- (Denmark) Claus Vissing 5.85
- (England) James Shanes 5.48
- (England) Ashley Morris (C) 5.38
- (England) Stefan Nielsen 5.06
- (England) Josh Auty 3.76
- (Australia) James Pearson 2.94

=== Edinburgh Monarchs ===
- (Australia) Sam Masters (C) 10.15
- (Australia) Josh Pickering 9.34
- (Australia) Kye Thomson 7.10
- (Italy) Michele Paco Castagna 6.25
- (Norway) Lasse Fredriksen 4.42
- (England) James Sarjeant 4.19
- (Australia) Jacob Hook 3.21

=== Glasgow Tigers ===
- (England) Craig Cook (C) 8.98
- (Denmark) Benjamin Basso 8.30
- (Denmark) Ulrich Østergaard 7.42
- (England) Tom Brennan 7.40
- (England) Danyon Hume 6.55
- (United States) Broc Nicol 5.93
- (Australia) Connor Bailey 5.55

=== Leicester Lions ===
- (Australia) Nick Morris 9.06
- (England) Kyle Howarth (C) 9.02
- (England) Richie Worrall 8.87
- (England) Connor Mountain 6.27
- (England) Dan Thompson 5.63
- (England) Max Clegg 5.51
- (England) Anders Rowe 5.00
- (England) Joe Thompson 4.68

=== Oxford Cheetahs ===
- (England) Scott Nicholls (C) 8.62
- (Australia) Aaron Summers 8.39
- (Australia) Troy Batchelor 7.82
- (United States) Dillon Ruml 5.60
- (England) Paul Starke 5.52
- (England) Jack Thomas 5.28
- (Australia) Cameron Heeps 5.26
- (Australia) Josh MacDonald 2.00
- (Australia) Luke Killeen 0.40

=== Plymouth Gladiators ===
- (England) Ben Barker 8.89
- (Denmark) Hans Andersen (C) 7.70
- (Denmark) Michael Palm Toft 7.41
- (England) Dan Gilkes 6.59
- (England) Alfie Bowtell 5.75
- (England) Lee Complin 4.91
- (England) Ben Morley 4.81
- (England) Henry Atkins 2.95
- (England) Connor Coles 2.86
- (England) Harry McGurk 0.86

=== Poole Pirates ===
- (England) Richard Lawson 9.92
- (England) Danny King (C) 9.08
- (England) Steve Worrall 8.98
- (Australia) Ben Cook 7.59
- (Australia) Zach Cook 7.13
- (England) Drew Kemp 5.96
- (England) Nathan Ablitt 1.95

=== Redcar Bears ===
- (Germany) Erik Riss 8.95
- (England) Charles Wright (C) 8.73
- (England) Lewis Kerr 7.95
- (England) Kyle Newman 6.00
- (Denmark) Kasper Andersen 5.72
- (England) Jordan Jenkins 5.34
- (England) Jason Edwards 4.67
- (England) Kyle Bickley 1.80

=== Scunthorpe Scorpions ===
- (Australia) Ryan Douglas 9.85
- (Finland) Tero Aarnio 7.20
- (Australia) Jake Allen 7.09
- (England) Anders Rowe 6.29
- (England) Simon Lambert (C) 5.88
- (Australia) Zaine Kennedy 5.86
- (England) James Wright 5.47
- (England) Jordan Palin 5.36
- (England) Adam Roynon 4.35
- (England) Ryan Kinsley 2.62

== See also ==
- List of United Kingdom speedway league champions
- Knockout Cup (speedway)
