= SGB Championship 2021 =

British motorcycle speedway season

- League: SGB Championship
- Champions: Poole Pirates
- Knockout Cup: Poole Pirates
- Individual: not held
- Pairs: not held
- Fours: not held
- Highest average: Sam Masters
- Division/s above: SGB Premiership 2021
- Division/s below: 2021 NDL

The SGB Championship 2021 was the second tier division, called the SGB Championship, of the British speedway championship in 2021.

Changes from the last edition of the Championship (held in 2019) were the addition of three teams and the loss of two teams. The 2019 Premiership club Poole Pirates, were the biggest profile club to join the league after dropping down from the highest league. Also the Kent Kings and Plymouth Gladiators both joined the league from the National Development League. Sheffield Tigers left the league to move up to the highest division and Somerset Rebels withdrew from the league altogether.

The league started on 21 May with twelve teams participating and race meetings were covered by Eurosport. Poole Pirates finished top of the regular season table and secured a place in the play off semi finals. Poole duly won their play off semi final against Leicester and would meet Glasgow in the final. Glasgow, who had finished second in the table, defeated Edinburgh in the other semi final despite being eliminated from the Knockout Cup the week before by their Scottish rivals.

Poole became the champions after a 96–84 aggregate win over Glasgow in the play off final. They also sealed the double winning the division 2 Knockout Cup for the third time in their history.

Locations of the 2021 SGB Championship teams

== Final Table ==
Pos	Team	P	W	D	L	4W	3W	D	1L	L	F	A	Pts
1	Poole Pirates	20	10	0	0	3	1	1	2	3	1000	794	49
2	Glasgow Tigers	20	9	0	1	2	3	0	2	3	937	833	46
3	Leicester Lions	20	9	0	1	2	1	1	2	4	970	827	42
4	Redcar Bears	20	7	3	0	2	2	1	2	3	917	851	42
5	Edinburgh Monarchs	20	5	3	2	1	2	1	3	3	910	879	33
6	Scunthorpe Scorpions	20	9	0	1	1	0	0	2	7	908	879	33
7	Birmingham Brummies	20	7	0	3	1	1	1	2	5	882	916	32
8	Kent Kings	20	6	0	4	0	0	3	2	5	839	934	26
9	Berwick Bandits	20	6	0	4	0	0	1	1	8	848	950	21
10	Plymouth Gladiators	20	6	2	2	0	0	0	1	9	826	952	21
11	Newcastle Diamonds	20	5	1	4	0	0	0	1	9	767	989	17
12	Eastbourne Eagles	withdrew 26 August, results expunged											

League scoring system

- Home loss by any number of points = 0
- Home draw = 1
- Home win by any number of points = 3
- Away loss by 7 points or more = 0
- Away loss by 6 points or less = 1
- Away draw = 2
- Away win by between 1 and 6 points = 3
- Away win by 7 points or more = 4

== Fixtures & results ==
Home \ Away	BER	BIR	EAS	ED	GLA	KK	LEI	NEW	PLY	PP	RED	SCU
Berwick Bandits		39–51	n/a	32–58	41–49	47–43	47–43	51–39	57–33	46–44	42–48	54–36
Birmingham Brummies	53–37		n/a	52–38	42–48	46–44	46–44	55–35	54–36	49–41	42–48	39–51
Eastbourne Eagles	n/a	n/a		44–46	47–43	58–32	41–48	n/a	54–36	45–44	n/a	54–36
Edinburgh Monarchs	50–40	45–45	n/a		41–43	44–44	49–40	58–32	47–42	40–50	45–45	52–38
Glasgow Tigers	54–36	49–41	50–40	44–46		43–23	49–41	55–35	59–31	52–38	52–38	49–41
Kent Kings	57–33	50–40	43–47	46–43	39–51		37–53	56–34	49–41	38–52	41–49	46–44
Leicester Lions	48–41	63–27	56–34	47–43	54–36	52–38		63–27	50–40	43–47	51–39	57–33
Newcastle Diamonds	49–40	44–45	n/a	42–48	48–42	45–45	49–41		45–33	29–61	35–55	52–38
Plymouth Gladiators	51–39	47–42	n/a	50–40	44–46	45–45	43–46	48–42		45–45	46–43	47–37
Poole Pirates	52–38	57–33	n/a	48–42	56–34	58–32	52–38	59–31	55–35		52–38	57–33
Redcar Bears	45–45	48–42	43–47	45–45	47–43	51–39	45–45	39–21	55–35	48–42		47–42
Scunthorpe Scorpions	47–43	52–38	49–41	54–36	51–39	63–27	39–51	57–33	56–34	50–34	46–44	

Legend: Blue = home team win; Yellow = draw; Red = away team win.

== Play Offs ==
**Quarter Finals**
Scunthorpe Scorpions	**36**	28	64
**Leicester Lions**	54	**38**	92
**Poole Pirates**
**Bye**
**Edinburgh Monarchs**	51	**57**	108
Redcar Bears	**39**	33	72
**Glasgow Tigers**
**Bye**

**Semi Finals**
Leicester Lions	42	**40**	82
**Poole Pirates**	**48**	50	98
Edinburgh Monarchs	34	**47**	81
**Glasgow Tigers**	**56**	43	99

**Final**
**Poole Pirates**	40	**56**	96
Glasgow Tigers	**50**	34	84

Home team scores are in bold
Overall aggregate scores are in red

=== Final ===
First Leg

2 November

Glasgow Tigers; Craig Cook 11; Tom Brennan 10; Ricky Wells 9 Marcin Nowak 7 Broc Nicol 6 Connor Bailey 4 Sam Jensen 3	50–40	Poole Pirates; Danny King 9 Rory Schlein 9 Benjamin Basso 6 Zach Cook (guest) 6 Steve Worrall 5 Danyon Hume 3 Ben Cook 2	Ashfield Stadium

Second Leg

4 November

Poole Pirates; Rory Schlein 12; Danny King 11; Benjamin Basso 9 Steve Worrall 9 Zach Cook (guest) 7 Ben Cook 5 Danyon Hume 3	56–34	Glasgow Tigers; Craig Cook 11; Tom Brennan 6 Marcin Nowak 6 Ricky Wells 4 Broc Nicol 4 Connor Bailey 3 Sam Jensen 0	Wimborne Road

== Knockout Cup ==
The 2021 SGB Championship Knockout Cup will be the 53rd edition of the Knockout Cup for tier two teams.

=== Tournament ===
Preliminary Rounds
Glasgow Tigers
BYE
Berwick Bandits
BYE
Edinburgh Monarchs	47	52	99
Newcastle Diamonds	43	38	81
Redcar Bears	46	35	81
Birmingham Brummies	44	55	99
Scunthorpe Scorpions
BYE
Leicester Lions
BYE
Eastbourne Eagles	58	40	98
Kent Kings	32	49	81
Plymouth Gladiators	41	29	70
Poole Pirates	49	61	110

Quarter Finals
Glasgow Tigers	51	48	99
Berwick Bandits	39	42	81
Edinburgh Monarchs	54	50	104
Birmingham Brummies	36	40	76
Scunthorpe Scorpions	38	40	78
Leicester Lions	52	50	102
Eastbourne Eagles	scr
Poole Pirates	w/o

Semi Finals
Glasgow Tigers	53	35	88
Edinburgh Monarchs	37	55	92
Leicester Lions	49	35	84
Poole Pirates	41	55	96

Final
Edinburgh Monarchs	42	33	75
Poole Pirates	47	57	104

HOME TEAM SCORES ARE IN BOLD
OVERALL AGGREGATE SCORES ARE IN RED
TIE WINNERS ARE IN BOLD

=== Final ===
First Leg

23 October

Edinburgh Monarchs; Richie Worrall 12; Sam Masters 10; Josh Pickering 7 Drew Kemp 7 Kye Thomson 5 Anders Rowe 1 Jason Edwards (guest) 1	42–47	Poole Pirates; Danny King 13; Benjamin Basso 13; Steve Worrall 9 Rory Schlein 5 Danyon Hume 5 Ben Cook 0 Connor Bailey (guest) 0	Armadale Stadium

Second Leg

23 October

Poole Pirates; Steve Worrall 13; Rory Schlein 12; Danny King 11; Benjamin Basso 8 Ben Cook 5 Danyon Hume 4 Zaine Kennedy (guest) 4	57–33	Edinburgh Monarchs; Sam Masters 10; Josh Pickering 8 Drew Kemp 8 Richie Worrall 5 Anders Rowe 2 Kye Thomson 0 Jason Edwards (guest) 0	Wimborne Road

== Teams and final averages ==
=== Berwick Bandits ===
- (Denmark) Kasper Andersen 7.36
- (England) Leon Flint 7.12
- (Austria) Dany Gappmaier 6.92
- (Denmark) Nikolaj Busk Jakobsen 6.59
- (Australia) Aaron Summers 6.49
- (Australia) Jye Etheridge 6.47
- (England) Kyle Bickley 4.50

=== Birmingham Brummies ===
- (England) Chris Harris 8.75
- (Germany) Erik Riss 8.19
- (Italy) Michele Paco Castagna 7.62
- (England) Ashley Morris 6.35
- (England) James Shanes 6.30
- (England) Jack Thomas 6.00
- (Germany) Valentin Grobauer 4.18

=== Edinburgh Monarchs ===
- (Australia) Sam Masters 9.95
- (Australia) Josh Pickering 8.94
- (England) Richie Worrall 8.83
- (Australia) Kye Thomson 6.35
- (England) Nathan Greaves 4.18
- (England) Drew Kemp 5.09
- (Scotland) William Lawson 3.89
- (England) Joe Lawlor 1.83
- (England) Luke Crang 1.25
- (England) Anders Rowe 0.67

=== Glasgow Tigers ===
- (England) Craig Cook 9.44
- (Denmark) Ulrich Østergaard 8.71
- (Poland) Marcin Nowak 8.24
- (England) Tom Brennan 8.18
- (United States) Ricky Wells 7.11
- (Australia) Justin Sedgmen 6.88
- (Denmark) Sam Jensen 6.82
- (United States) Broc Nicol 6.32
- (Australia) Connor Bailey 5.02
- (England) Jack Smith 3.71

=== Kent Kings ===
- (England) Scott Nicholls 9.74
- (Australia) Troy Batchelor 9.60
- (England) Paul Starke 6.78
- (England) Tom Bacon 6.00
- (Australia) Cameron Heeps 5.55
- (England) Daniel Gilkes 4.30
- (England) Ben Morley 4.18
- (England) Jake Mulford 3.40
- (England) Paul Hurry 2.37

=== Leicester Lions ===
- (Australia) Nick Morris 9.13
- (Australia) Ryan Douglas 8.66
- (England) Kyle Howarth 8.54
- (Denmark) Hans Andersen 8.44
- (England) Dan Thompson 5.95
- (Australia) Zaine Kennedy 5.85
- (England) Jake Knight 5.00
- (England) Joe Thompson 4.76
- (Australia) Ty Proctor 3.09
- (England) Josh Bates 3.00

=== Newcastle Diamonds ===
- (England) Ben Barker 7.46
- (Australia) Matthew Wethers 6.59
- (England) James Wright 6.09
- (England) Connor Mountain 6.07
- (England) Adam Roynon 6.00
- (England) Max Clegg 5.81
- (England) Jack Parkinson-Blackburn 1.60
- (England) Archie Freeman 0.46
- (England) Joe Alcock 0.00

=== Plymouth Gladiators ===
- (Denmark) Bjarne Pedersen 9.21
- (Australia) Jason Crump 7.15
- (England) Alfie Bowtell 6.16
- (Australia) Zane Keleher 5.07
- (United States) Dillon Ruml 4.71
- (Australia) Zach Cook 4.66
- (England) Jason Edwards 2.57
- (France) Steven Goret 2.46
- (England) Luke Ruddick 0.00
- (England) Jack Smith 0.00

=== Poole Pirates ===
- (England) Steve Worrall 9.73
- (England) Danny King 9.12
- (Australia) Rory Schlein 8.71
- (Australia) Ben Cook 6.21
- (Denmark) Stefan Nielsen 6.09
- (Denmark) Benjamin Basso 5.88
- (England) Danyon Hume 5.53
- (Australia) Zane Keleher 3.47

=== Redcar Bears ===
- (England) Lewis Kerr 9.23
- (England) Charles Wright 9.11
- (Australia) Jake Allen 8.34
- (Denmark) Michael Palm Toft 8.00
- (England) James Sarjeant 5.14
- (Australia) Jordan Stewart 5.00
- (England) Anders Rowe 4.83
- (England) Jordan Jenkins 4.57
- (England) Ryan Kinsley 0.67

=== Scunthorpe Scorpions ===
- (England) Josh Auty 8.00
- (Denmark) Thomas Jørgensen 7.83
- (England) Adam Ellis 7.57
- (Finland) Tero Aarnio 6.77
- (Netherlands) Theo Pijper 6.71
- (England) Jordan Palin 6.49
- (England) Simon Lambert 6.46
- (Australia) Josh MacDonald 4.49

=== Eastbourne Eagles (withdrew) ===
- (England) Nathan Ablitt
- (England) Tom Brennan
- (England) Jason Edwards
- (England) Drew Kemp
- (England) Edward Kennett
- (England) Lewis Kerr
- (England) Richard Lawson
- (England) Kyle Newman

== See also ==
- List of United Kingdom speedway league champions
- Knockout Cup (speedway)
