= Zaine Kennedy =

Australian speedway rider

- Born: 5 April 1998 (age 28); Redcliffe, Queensland, Australia
- Nationality: Australian

Career history
- 2019: Sheffield Tigers
- 2021: Leicester Lions
- 2022-2023, 2025: Scunthorpe Scorpions

Individual honours
- 2026: Queensland champion

Zaine Kennedy (born 5 April 1998) is a speedway rider from Australia.

== Speedway career ==
Kennedy represented the Australian U-23 team at the 2018 Team Speedway Junior World Championship semi-finals.

Kennedy began his British speedway career when he joined Sheffield Tigers for the SGB Championship 2019. His 2020 season was disrupted by the COVID-19 pandemic, before he signed for the Leicester Lions during the SGB Championship 2021 season.

In 2022, Kennedy rode for the Scunthorpe Scorpions in the SGB Championship 2022 but suffered an end of season injury when he fractured his pelvis in a crash. In 2023, he signed for Scunthorpe again but remained in his native Australia after failing to fully recover from his injuries. After another year spent in Australia, Kennedy finally returned to Scunthorpe for the SGB Championship 2025. His brother Declan Kennedy also signed for the club.

In November 2025, Kennedy won the Queensland Solo Championship at Pioneer Park in Ayr.
