= Kye Thomson =

Australian motorcycle speedway rider

- Born: 5 October 1998 (age 28); Yandina, Queensland, Australia
- Nationality: Australian

Career history
- 2021–2025: Edinburgh Monarchs

Kye Thomson (born 5 October 1998) is an Australian motorcycle speedway rider.

== Speedway career ==
In 2018, Thomson finished second in the Australian Under-21 Individual Speedway Championship and won the Tasmanian solo championship at the Loxford Park Speedway in Kurri Kurri, Australia.

Thomson began his British speedway career riding for the Edinburgh Monarchs in the SGB Championship 2021 and by the end of the season had recorded 209 points. He won both the MSSC Rider of the Year award and the George Wells Memorial Trophy for the most improved young rider. He duly signed for another season for the Monarchs for the SGB Championship 2022 season.

During 2023 and 2024, Thomson re-signed for the Monarchs for a third consecutive season and competed in the SGB Premiership 2023 and the 2024 Championship. Thomsen once again raced for the Monarchs for a fourth and fifth successive year respectively in 2024 and 2025.
