= James Pearson (speedway rider) =

Australian speedway rider

- Born: 21 May 2005 (age 21); Blacktown, Sydney, Australia
- Nationality: Australian

Career history

Great Britain
- 2022-2023: Birmingham
- 2024: Glasgow

Poland
- 2022–2023: Leszno
- 2025: Opole

Team honours
- 2024: U21 team world bronze

James Pearson (born 21 May 2005) is an Australian speedway rider.

== Speedway career ==
Pearson raced in Poland for Unia Leszno and Denmark for Region Varde Elitesport before riding in Britain and competed in the FIM World Under 16 Speedway Solo Title, finishing sixth. His mentor is Leigh Adams.

Pearson began his British speedway career riding for the Birmingham Brummies during the SGB Championship 2022. Pearson signed for Belle Vue Aces and is therefore an asset of the club despite spending the 2022 season on loan to Birmingham.

In 2023, Pearson re-signed for Birmingham for the SGB Championship 2023 and the following season he signed for Glasgow Tigers for the 2024 season. Also in 2024, he helped Australia win the bronze medal at the Under-21 Team World Championship in Manchester.
