= Jack Thomas (speedway rider) =

British speedway rider

- Born: 25 April 1999 (age 27); Norwich, Norfolk, England
- Nationality: British (English)

Career history
- 2017: Newcastle Diamonds
- 2017, 2022: King's Lynn Stars
- 2018: Glasgow Tigers
- 2019: Leicester Lions
- 2021: Birmingham Brummies
- 2022: Oxford Cheetahs

Team honours
- 2019: SGB Championship

Jack Thomas (born 25 April 1999) is a speedway rider from England.

== Speedway career ==
Thomas rides in the top two tiers of British Speedway. In 2019, he rode for the champion Leicester Lions during the SGB Championship 2019.

In 2022, Thomas rode in the highest league for King's Lynn Stars during the SGB Premiership 2022. He also signed the Oxford Cheetahs for the SGB Championship 2022. The Cheetahs were returning to action after a 14-year absence from British Speedway. His 2022 season came to an early end after he broke both wrists while racing for King's Lynn.

In 2023, Thomas signed for Ipswich Witches for the SGB Premiership 2023 as their rising star and also signed for Poole Pirates for the SGB Championship 2023 but suffered serious injuries (including two broken vertebrae and a broken neck) in March practice, which ruled him out for the season.
