= Jacob Hook =

Australian speedway rider

- Born: 21 August 2002 (age 24); Brisbane, Australia
- Nationality: Australian

Career history
- 2022-2023: Edinburgh
- 2023: Berwick
- 2024: Plymouth
- 2025: Workington

Jacob Hook (born 21 August 2002) is a speedway rider from Australia.

== Speedway career ==
Hook began riding at the North Brisbane Junior Motorcycle Club and impressed in Australian junior racing. He began his British speedway career riding for the Edinburgh Monarchs in the SGB Championship 2022. Hook's 2020 & 2021 seasons were disrupted by the COVID-19 pandemic before he joined the Monarchs.

In 2023, Hook re-signed for Edinburgh in the SGB Championship 2023 and also signed for Edinburgh's NDL academy side. He was later dropped by the first team but signed for Scottish rivals Berwick Bandits for the remainder of the season.

Hook signed for the Plymouth Gladiators for the 2024 season. Hook signed for Workington Comets for the SGB Championship 2025, as one of the five Australians included in the team for the season.
