= Henry Atkins (speedway rider) =

English speedway rider

- Born: 2 January 2001 (age 25); Exeter, Devon
- Nationality: British (English)

Career history
- 2019: Somerset Rebels
- 2022: Plymouth Gladiators
- 2023–2024: Oxford Cheetahs

Team honours
- 2023: NDL champions

Henry Michael Atkins (born 2 January 2001) is an English motorcycle speedway rider. He currently rides in two of the three tiers of British Speedway, for the Oxford Cheetahs in the SGB Championship and the Oxford Chargers in the National Development League.

== Speedway career ==
Atkins was a British 125cc Champion and began his senior British career riding for the Somerset Rebels in 2019. After the 2020 season cancellation because of the COVID-19 pandemic, he joined Plymouth Gladiators for the SGB Championship 2021 and Eastbourne Seagulls in the National Development League but Eastbourne later withdrew from the league.

For the 2022 season, Atkins re-signed for Plymouth and joined the newly reformed Oxford Cheetahs National Development team called the Oxford Chargers. In 2023, he left Plymouth for the Oxford Cheetahs senior team for the SGB Championship 2023. He also remained with the Chargers for the 2023 NDL season, where he won the NDL league title with Oxford, defeating Leicester in a one-off Grand Final.

Atkins re-signed for Oxford for the 2024 season.
