= Sam Hagon =

English speedway rider

- Born: 10 October 2004 (age 22); Waltham Abbey, England
- Nationality: British (English)

Career history
- 2021: Mildenhall Fen Tigers
- 2022: Oxford Chargers
- 2023: Birmingham Brummies
- 2023-2024: Belle Vue Colts
- 2024: Poole Pirates
- 2024–2025: Leicester Lions
- 2025: Berwick Bandits
- 2026: Glasgow Tigers

Individual honours
- 2024, 2025: British U21 champion
- 2024: NDL riders' champion

Team honours
- 2024: tier 2 champions
- 2024: tier 2 KO Cup
- 2021: tier 3 champions

Sam Hagon (born 10 October 2004) is a motorcycle speedway rider from England. He is the current British U21 champion, having won the event in 2024 and 2025.

== Career ==
Hagon started racing in the British leagues during the 2021 National Development League speedway season for Mildenhall Fen Tigers and won the league title with the Suffolk-based team.

The following season, Hagon switched to the Oxford Chargers and completed a solid season, averaging 6.35. In 2023, he joined the Belle Vue Colts from Oxford and his good form saw him selected by Birmingham Brummies during the SGB Championship 2023 campaign.

Hagon signed for the Poole Pirates for their 2024 title and knockout Cup winning season and replaced Joe Thompson as the rising star for the Leicester Lions in the Premiership. Later that year he won the 2024 British Under 21 Championship.

Hagon signed for Berwick Bandits for the SGB Championship 2025 and successfully defended his British U-21 at the 2025 British Speedway Championship.

== Personal life ==
Hagon is part of a large speedway family. His father Martin Hagon was a speedway rider, as was his grandfather Alf Hagon. Meanwhile, his uncle Martin Dugard is a former Speedway Grand Prix winner.
