= Leicester Lions =

British motorcycle speedway team

Club information
- Track address: Hydroscand Arena; Beaumont Park; 1 The Lions; Leicester; LE4 1DZ
- Country: England
- Founded: 1968, 2011
- Closed: 1983
- Promoter: Paul Cairns, Stewart Dickson & Jennifer Crossland
- Team manager: Stewart Dickson
- Team captain: Sam Masters
- League: SGB Premiership; National Development League
- Website: www.leicesterspeedway.com

Club facts
- Colours: Red and Yellow
- Track size: 300 metres (330 yd)
- Track record time: 58.06s
- Track record date: 17th July 2023
- Track record holder: Max Fricke

Current senior team
Rider	CMA
(Australia) Ryan Douglas
(Australia) Sam Masters
(England) Kyle Howarth
(England) Dan Thompson
(Australia) Nick Morris
(England) Drew Kemp
(England) Dan Gilkes

Current junior team
Rider	CMA

Major team honours
Premiership KO winners	2025
SGB Championship	2019
Championship Shield	2019
Midland Cup	1972, 1974
NDL Champions	2019, 2022
NDL KO Cup winners	2019, 2022
NDL Pairs	2022

Leicester Lions are a speedway team which originally operated from 1968 until 1983 and again from 2011. The team race at the Beaumont Park Stadium (or Hydroscand Arena for sponsorship purposes). Since 2019, the club have also run a junior side known as the Lion Cubs.

== Previous Leicester teams ==
Speedway started at Leicester in 1928 at Leicester Stadium (also known as the Blackbird Road Stadium) with the Leicester Stadium team entering the English Dirt Track League in 1929 finishing 5th but by 1931 the track, beset with problems, closed. Speedway was also staged at a track known as Leicester Super off Melton Road. After World War II, speedway returned in 1948. The team were nicknamed the Leicester Hunters and ran under that name until closure in 1962. In 1949 the team started in the National League Division Three and moved up over the years operating in the top flight for some time until the end of 1961.

== The first Lions era ==
=== 1960s ===
Speedway returned to Leicester Stadium in 1968, when Reg Fearman and Ron Wilson moved the Long Eaton Archers team from Long Eaton Stadium. The team were renamed the Lions but the colours remained the same and they competed in the British League, the top division of British speedway at the time. The first season resulted in 12th place finish despite Anders Michanek recording a league average of 10.07. Michanek left in 1969 but Ray Wilson stepped up and helped the Lions to a 5th place finish.

=== 1970s ===
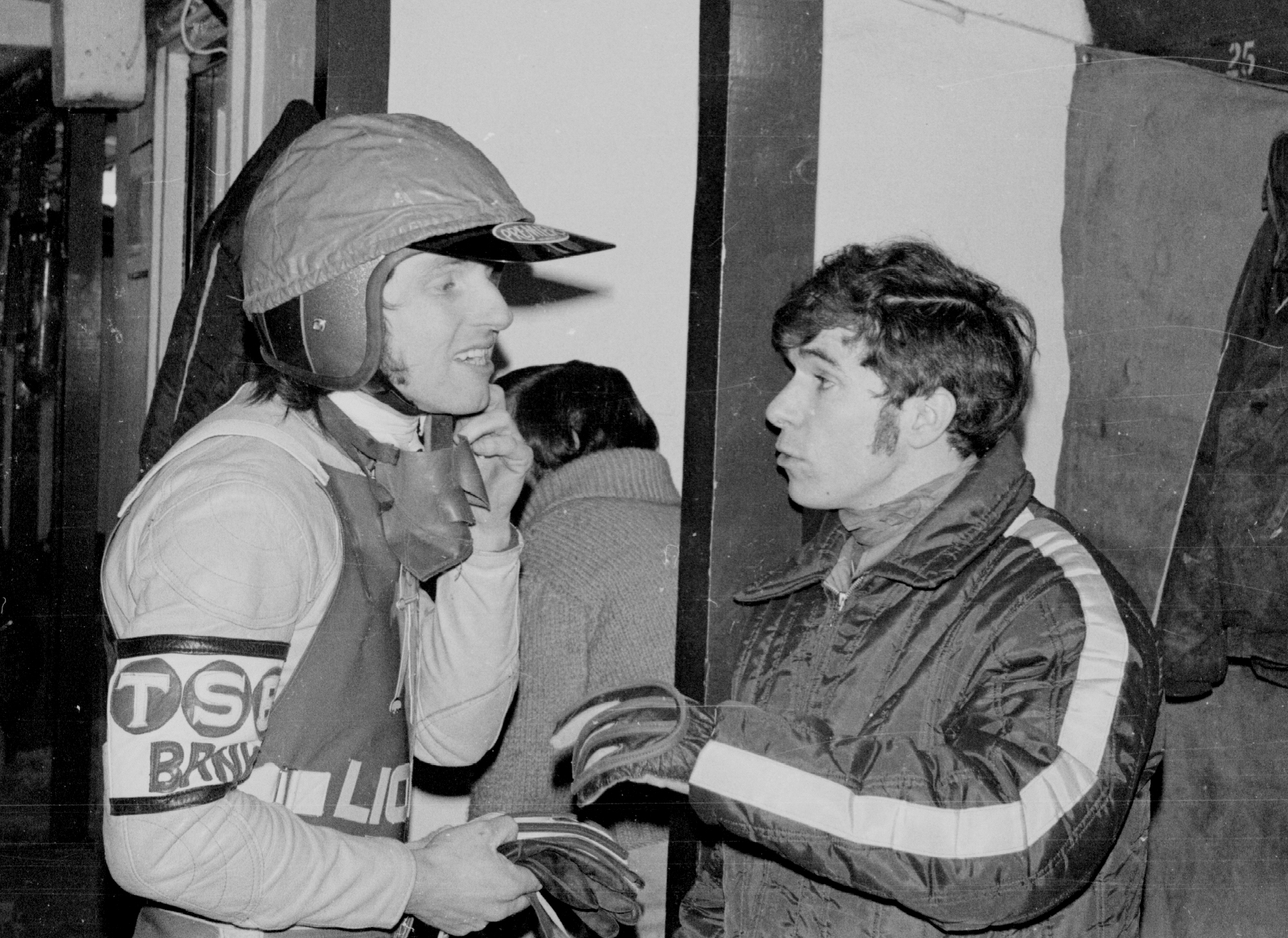
Ray Wilson and Dave Jessup discuss tactics, circa 1975

The team finished fourth in 1970 before taking the runner-up place during the 1971 British League season. The consistency of good results was due to the riding of Ray Wilson, John Boulger and Graham Plant.

Dave Jessup joined in 1972, which led Leicester to win the Midland Cup, which was their first silverware since returning. Despite the loss of Boulger to rivals Cradley Heath in 1974, Leicester managed to win another Midland Cup crown.

The team's results began to slide and then Dave Jessup left in 1976. In 1977, Vic White took over from Wilson, the two acting as co-promoters until 1980. The Lions saw out the decade with some disappointing seasons, failing to make the top half of the table despite the best efforts of Ila Teromaa and John Titman.

=== 1980s ===
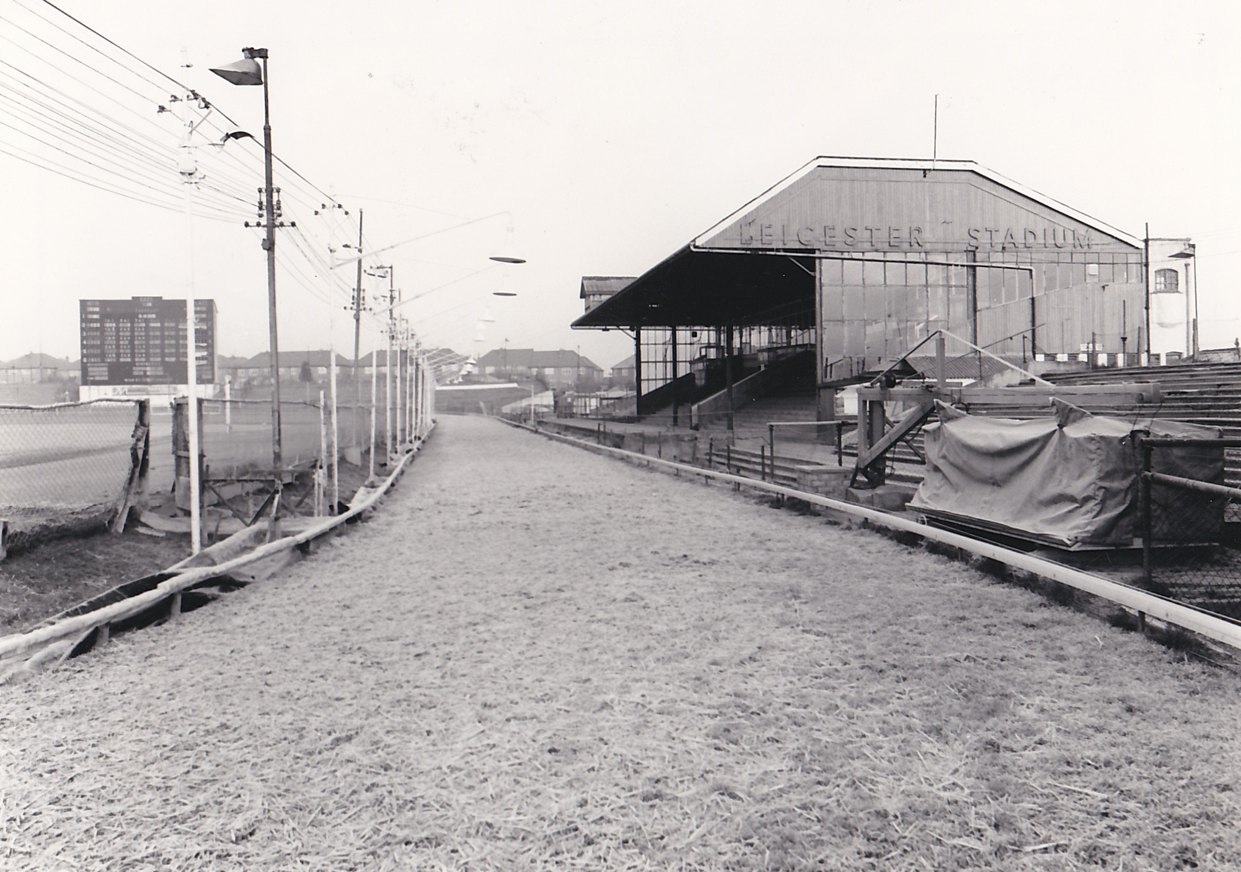
The Blackbird Road stadium was sold in 1983.

In 1980, Martin Rogers took over the promoting and Leicester attempted to change their fortunes by signing Les Collins from Belle Vue for a club record fee. Collins won the Riders' championship but the Lions finished mid-table and then in 1982, the team finished 15th out of 16 during the 1981 British League season.

Speedway continued through the 1983 season with the knowledge that the Midland Sport Stadiums Ltd were selling the Blackbird Road stadium for housing development. The Lions finished 12th in their final season.

The team was sold at the end of the 1983 season and the stadium closed, with Rogers' attempts at finding a new venue for 1985 failing.

== Second Lions era ==
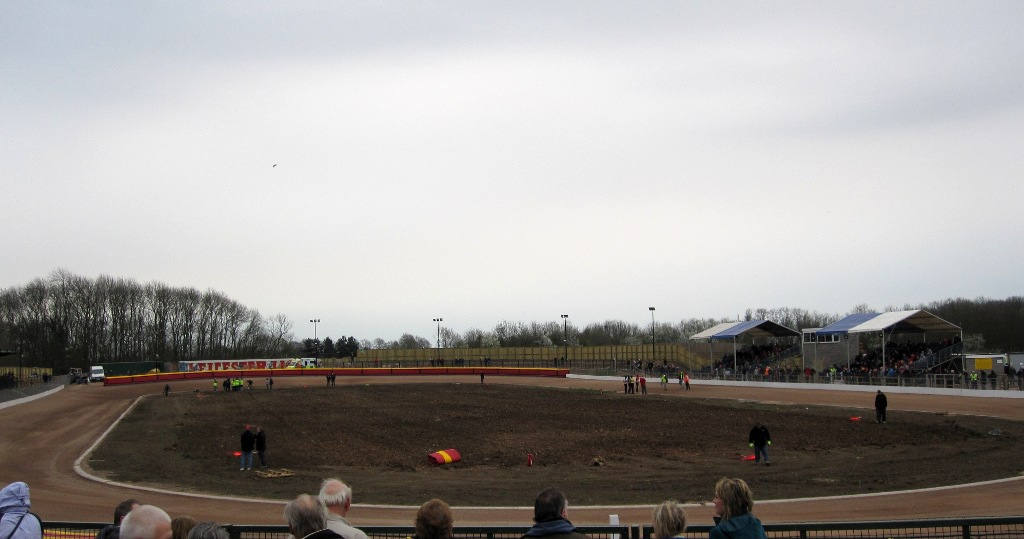
Beaumont Park

In the late 2000s, a group of fans with chairman Ken Naylor from the Leicester Speedway Supporters Club/campaign group began discussions with various local bodies about the return of Speedway to the Leicester area. At the meeting of the Leicester City Council Planning and Development Control Committee held on 4 August 2009 the application for a speedway track at Beaumont Park was approved. The new track was constructed at Beaumont Park with the Lions returning in March 2011 as a Premier League team, with three-time cycle speedway world champion David Hemsley as promoter.

=== 2010s ===
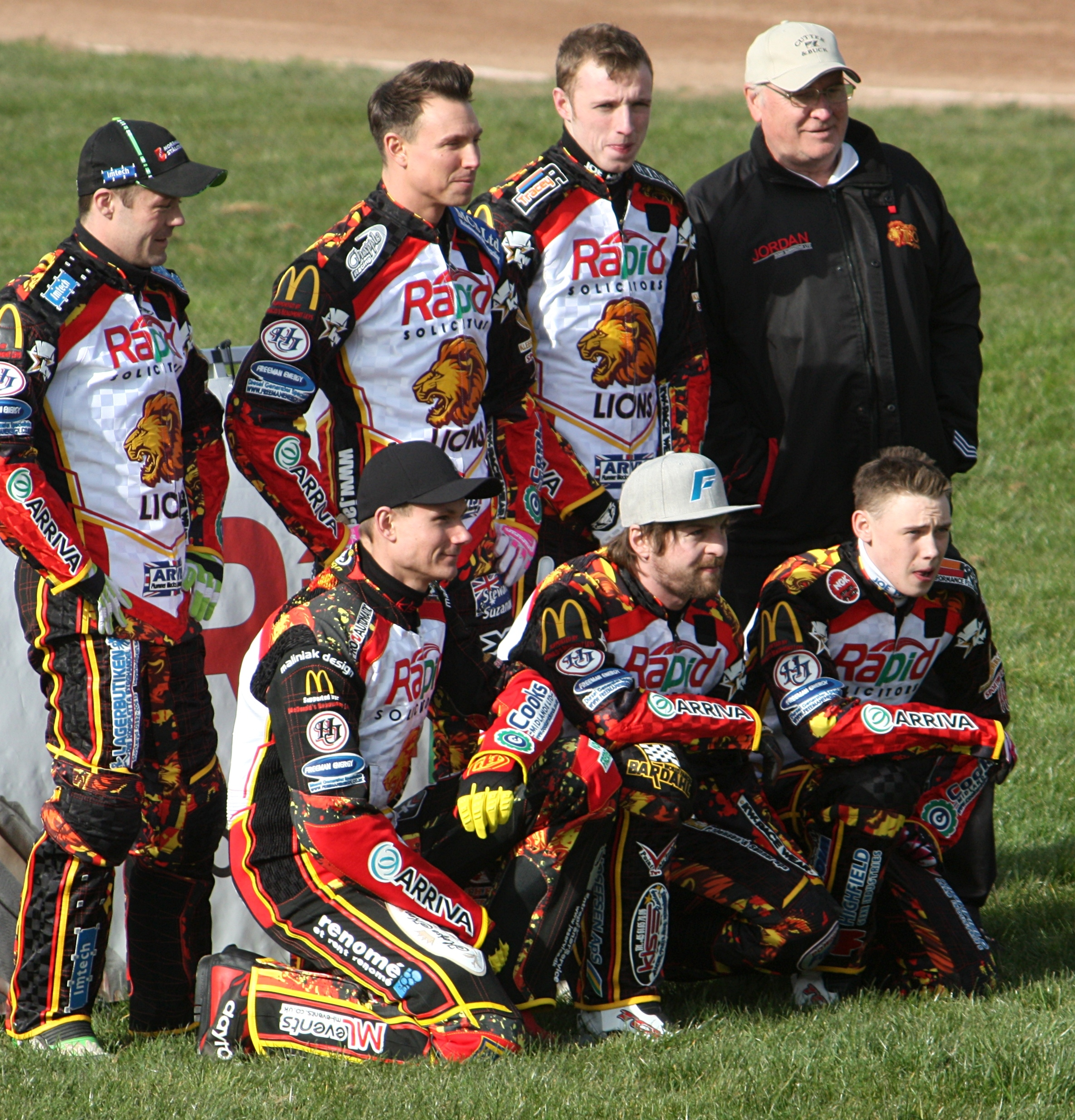
2014 Lions team

The 2011 season was littered with rider changes and a last place in the league. However, the Lions hosted the Premier League Four-Team Championship and finished as runners-up to Ipswich Witches. The following season saw the Lions again finished as runners-up (this time to Berwick Bandits) in the Premier Fours and a sixth place in the Premier League, therefore making the end of season playoffs. The team rode one more season in the Premier League, finishing 7th.

At the BSPA AGM in November 2013, the Lions were accepted into the Elite League for 2014. Norrie Allan was named as team manager, with former manager Glyn Taylor concentrating on track curation. Australian Jason Doyle was brought in as number 1 but the Lions finished bottom of the Elite League but did also enter a team in the National League-level National Trophy competition. In 2015, Doyle topped the league averages and won the Elite League Riders' Championship on his home track but Doyle left at the end of the season and the team suffered a poor 2016 campaign.

Shortly before the start of the 2017 season, the team was taken over by Sheffield Tigers promoter Damian Bates, and the track altered to take in the curb around bends 1 and 2. After finishing bottom of the league, the team avoided relegation with a playoff win over SGB Championship winners Sheffield Tigers.

Before the 2019 season, the club owners took the decision to drop Leicester Lions down to the SGB Championship. Also for the 2019 season, for the first time the club owners decided to enter a team, Leicester Lion Cubs, into the third tier of British speedway, the National League. The decision to drop a division was good one as the team won the season opening Championship Shield competition defeating the Eastbourne Eagles 103-76 on aggregate and then on 22 October, they secured the SGB Championship, beating Glasgow Tigers over two legs in the play-off final. The strong all-round team was headed by Scott Nicholls, Ryan Douglas and Richie Worrall.

=== 2020s ===
Following a season lost to the COVID-19 pandemic the team finished 3rd in the SGB Championship 2021. The following season, was successful in terms of topping the league table and reaching the play off final in the SGB Championship 2022 before missing out on the title to Poole Pirates. The team's leading rider was Nick Morris. The juniors dominated the 2022 season winning the National Development League, National League Knock-out Cup and National League Pairs (Dan Thompson & Joe Thompson).

In 2023, the club announced that they would move up to the Premiership for the 2023 season and brought in Max Fricke at number 1, the team finished 5th. A solid 2024 season saw the Lions reach the play off final and the Lion Cubs win the NDL.

In 2025, the Lions ran two additional junior teams teams and won the Knockout Cup (tier 1) for the first time in their history, defeating King's Lynn in the final. The Lions also reached the play off final but lost out to Ipswich Witches.

== Season summary ==
Extended content

Year and league	Position	Notes
1968 British League season	12th	
1969 British League season	5th	
1970 British League season	4th	
1971 British League season	2nd	
1972 British League season	5th	Midland Cup winners
1973 British League season	4th	
1974 British League season	10th	Midland Cup winners
1975 British League season	8th	
1976 British League season	19th	
1977 British League season	19th	
1978 British League season	11th	
1979 British League season	17th	
1980 British League season	11th	
1981 British League season	15th	
1982 British League season	10th	
1983 British League season	12th	
2011 Premier League speedway season	14th	
2012 Premier League speedway season	6th	
2013 Premier League speedway season	7th	
2014 Elite League speedway season	9th	
2015 Elite League speedway season	6th	
2016 Elite League	8th	
SGB Premiership 2017	8th	
SGB Premiership 2018	7th	
SGB Championship 2019	1st	Champions & Championship Shield
SGB Championship 2021	3rd	PO semi finals
SGB Championship 2022	2nd	PO final
SGB Premiership 2023	5th	
SGB Premiership 2024	2nd	PO final
SGB Premiership 2025	2nd	PO final, KO Cup winners

== Season summary (juniors) ==
Extended content

Year	Position	Notes
2019	1st	League and Knockout Cup winners
2021	6th	
2022	1st	League, Knockout Cup & Pairs winners
2023	1st	Play off finalists
2024	1st	League winners
2025 NDL	3rd	Lion Cubs
2025 National Trophy	tbc	Fox Cubs

== Previous teams ==
Extended content

2011

Riders signed for the start of the 2011 season were Sergey Darkin, Ilya Bondarenko, Jamie Courtney, Jan Graversen, John Oliver, Richard Hall (on loan from Sheffield Tigers), and Richard Sweetman (on loan from Swindon Robins). Mathieu Trésarrieu was brought in when Bondarenko was out through injury. By July 2011, four of the seven riders who started the season had either left or been replaced, with only Bondarenko, Graversen and Oliver remaining, and Hemsley had handed over team management duties to Jason Attwood. Promoter Hemsley brought in Kauko Nieminen, Henning Bager and Magnus Karlsson, with Charles Wright and Ashley Morris as reserves. In August, Oliver and Wright were released, with Viktor Bergström and Jason Garrity coming in for the remainder of the season. Graversen finished the season as the team's top points scorer with 211 points from league and cup matches.

2012

In November 2011, Graversen and Karlsson were the first riders confirmed for the 2012 season, with Jari Mäkinen the third signing. At the end of November Nieminen signed to return in 2012 and the top three in the 2012 team was completed by Danish Under-21 Champion Lasse Bjerre. Sixth rider to be signed was Simon Lambert. The team was completed by Simon Nielsen. An injury for Neilsen early in the season saw Kyle Hughes drafted in as a temporary replacement and a broken femur for Nielsen later in the season led to the signing of Linus Eklöf, with Lambert leaving to accommodate the Swede's higher average, and Lewis Blackbird moving up from the National League to complete the new line-up. Lions again finished as runners-up (this time to Berwick Bandits) in the Premier Fours.

2013

The team for 2013 was announced, subject to BSPA approval, on 25 November 2012. Nieminen, Bjerre, Graversen, Nielsen, and Blackbird were joined by Kevin Doolan and Adam Roynon. An injury to Roynon after only one match for the Lions saw the return of Magnus Karlsson to the team. Despite scoring at over a point above his starting average, Blackbird was allowed to leave for Scunthorpe Scorpions in May after the signing of Robert Branford. Later that month, Nielsen lost his place to Alex Edberg. Branford was replaced by James Sarjeant in July and with two league matches to go Sarjeant and the injured Nieminen were replaced by Simon Nielsen and Linus Eklof.

2014

At the BSPA AGM in November 2013 the Lions were accepted into the Elite League for 2014. The first two riders for 2014 were confirmed in early December when Tom Perry and Max Clegg were picked in the reserve draft. Mads Korneliussen, Patrick Hougaard, Peter Ljung, and Jason Doyle were named in the top five of the side, but doubts over Doyle's visa delayed the completion of the team. With Doyle receiving a tier 5 visa, his place was confirmed, and Simon Stead was named in the final team place. Norrie Allan was named as team manager, with former manager Glyn Taylor concentrating on track curation. In May Ljung withdrew from racing in Britain and was replaced by Lasse Bjerre. Perry was replaced by Josh Bates. An injury to Hougaard led him to withdraw from British speedway, and Lions brought in Krzysztof Buczkowski and Nicolai Klindt, with Bjerre losing his place.

2015

The first rider signed for 2015 was Polish Under-21 champion Szymon Woźniak. They then selected Josh Auty and Simon Lambert in the reserve draft. Jason Doyle returned for a second season, and former Eastbourne Eagles rider Mikkel Michelsen also signed. Bjarne Pedersen and Grzegorz Walasek completed the team. Pedersen and Michelsen had both left by May, with Lewis Bridger and Sam Masters replacing them, although Bridger quit after only one meeting.

2016

With Lions' Saturday race night prompting 2015 number one Doyle to leave, Lions retained Walasek, Woźniak, and Auty from the previous season's team, also signing Paul Starke at reserve. Former rider Nikolai Klindt returned, but by late January they were still short of two heat leaders, with team manager Norrie Allan admitting "We need two riders of heat leader standard, and there just aren't any out there...we could be looking at putting in two riders just to complete a team." They eventually signed Sebastian Ułamek and Patrick Hougaard, starting the season over 4 points below the team building limit. After losing the first four league meetings, Walasek was dropped, to be replaced by Aaron Summers. An injury to Ułamek saw him being replaced by Davey Watt.

2019 The Leicester Lion Cubs first two signings for the season were the Thompson twins Dan and Joe as their reserves. Ellis Perks was confirmed as the third signing for the Lion Cubs, he would start the season at number 1 and also double up with the first team Leicester Lions. On 18 December 2018, the Lion Cubs announced their next two signings which were Danyon Hume (as captain) and Kelsey Dugard, with the final two signings confirmed as Luke Ruddick and Jamie Halder.

On 3 January 2019, Leicester confirmed they would be managed by club co-promoter Dave Darcy and he would be assisted by David Howard. Danyon Hume was later named as team captain, on 31 January. Kelsey Dugard was injured following injuries suffered in a crash during the Leicester Press and Practice day on 15 March and was replaced by Ryan MacDonald.

On 28 October 2019, the Lion Cubs won the title after home and away victories in the play-off final against Kent Kings, and on the following evening (29 October) they completed the League and Cup double by winning the National League Knockout Cup with an aggregate victory in the final over the Belle Vue Colts.

2020-2021 After a Challenge match victory away at Scunthorpe 61-53 in their only meeting in the COVID-19 hit 2020 season, the Lion Cubs built a new team for the 2021 National Development League speedway season, with the team building points limit reduced to 35 with a new League focus on youth development. Only Dan and Joe Thompson returned from the double-winning side of 2019, with Joe Lawlor and Tom Spencer being joined by Jamie Halder and first year riders Ben Trigger and Kai Ward making up the initial 2021 declaration. However, Jamie Halder suffered a broken ankle in an unfortunate domestic fall prior to the first Lion Cubs meeting. After being granted a short term rider replacement facility for Jamie to start the season, a change was needed to be made and a third first year rider, Mickie Simpson joined the Lion Cubs to complete the seven riders. The team had an underwhelming season, Joe Lawlor announced his retirement from the sport and the Lion Cubs ended the 2021 season at the bottom of the NDL. However, all six riders who rode throughout the season showed average increases at the end of season compared to the start of the season.

== Track records ==
- 2011–2012 (321m): 61.47s Kauko Nieminen, 7 April 2012
- 2013–2015 (317m): 59.06s Niels-Kristian Iversen, 7 June 2014
- 2016 (302m): 60.63s Craig Cook, 18 June 2016
- 2017–2023 (300m): 58.79s Emil Sayfutdinov, 17 April 2023
- 2017-2024 (300m): 58.06s Max Fricke, 17 July 2024

== Notable riders ==
- (Australia) John Boulger
- (England) Les Collins
- (Australia) Ryan Douglas
- (Australia) Jason Doyle
- (Australia) Max Fricke
- (England) Dave Jessup
- (Australia) Sam Masters
- (Sweden) Anders Michanek
- (Australia) Nick Morris
- (England) Scott Nicholls
- (England) Graham Plant
- (Finland) Ila Teromaa
- (Australia) John Titman
- (England) Ray Wilson
- (England) Richie Worrall

== See also ==
- List of Leicester Lions riders
- Speedway in Leicester
