= Beaumont Park Stadium =

Stadium

Hydroscand Arena
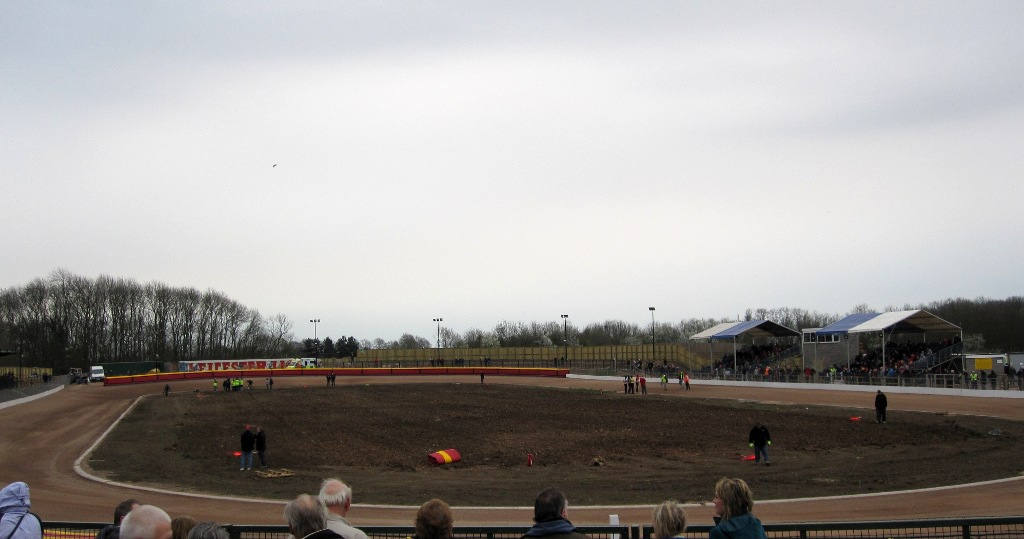
- Location: Leicester, England
- Coordinates: 52°40′08″N 1°09′38″W
- Opened: 2011
- Major events: Speedway

Oval

Beaumont Park Stadium or the Hydroscand Arena for sponsorship purposes is a sports stadium on Beaumont Park, Leicester. The stadium is mainly used for motorcycle speedway and is the home track for the Leicester Lions.

At the meeting of the Leicester City Council Planning and Development Control Committee held on 4 August 2009 the application for a speedway track at Beaumont Park was approved. The track was constructed during 2010 and opened in 2011.

In 2023, the stadium changed its name (due to a sponsorship change) to the Pidcock Motorcycles Arena from the Paul Chapman and Sons Arena.

On 2 January 2025 it was announced that the stadium was to be renamed The Hydroscand Arena in a two year deal with Hydroscand who are an international family-owned business which was founded in Stockholm, Sweden in 1969, with their UK Head Office based in Nottingham. They have 11 branches throughout the country, including the branch they acquired in Leicester - Leicester Hose & Hydraulics. They offer a complete range of quality hydraulic hoses and industrial hoses, hydraulic fittings and fluid transfer solutions.

== See also ==
- Leicester Lions
- Leicester Stadium (speedway team)
