= Ben Barker (speedway rider) =

British speedway rider

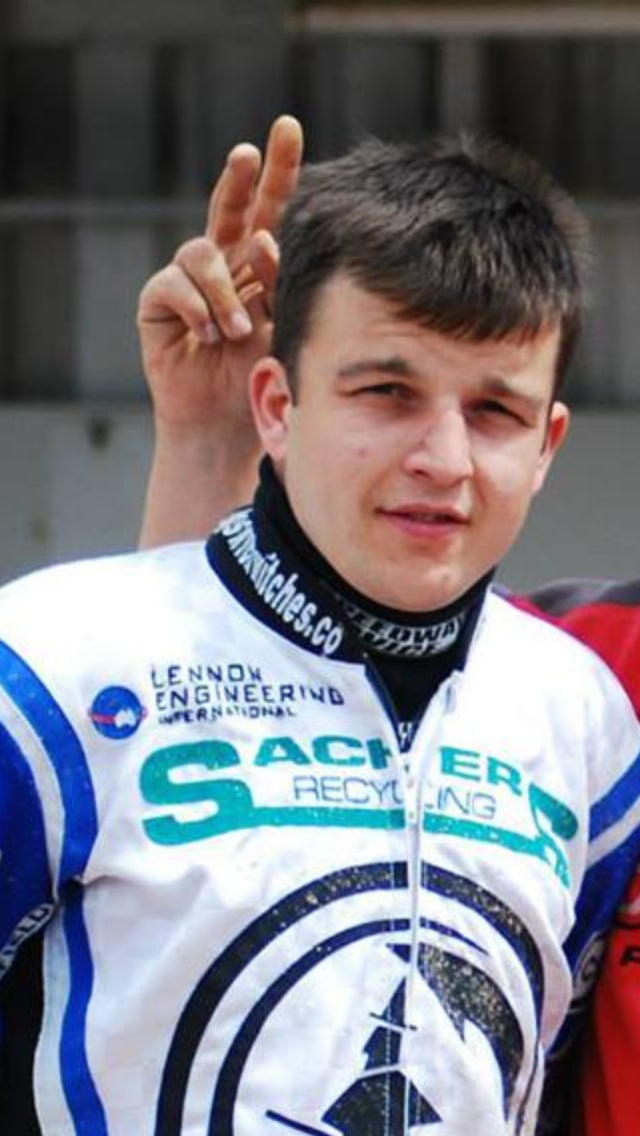
- Born: 10 March 1988 (age 38); Truro, England
- Nationality: British (English)

Career history

Great Britain
- 2003: Trelawny Pitbulls
- 2003–2005: Oxford Cheetahs
- 2004, 2008–2010: Coventry Bees
- 2005: Exeter Falcons
- 2006, 2020: Somerset Rebels
- 2006–2008: Stoke Potters
- 2011–2014: Birmingham Brummies
- 2011–2012, 2014, 2022–2025, 2026: Plymouth
- 2013, 2016, 2022–2023: Ipswich Witches
- 2015: Berwick Bandits
- 2015, 2019: Peterborough Panthers
- 2016: Glasgow Tigers
- 2017–2019: Redcar Bears
- 2017: Rye House Rockets
- 2019: Scunthorpe Scorpions
- 2021: Newcastle Diamonds
- 2021: King's Lynn Stars

Poland
- 2021: Wrocław

Team honours
- 2006: Conference League Fours
- 2008: Craven Shield winner

Benjamin John Barker (born 10 March 1988 in Truro, Cornwall) is a British speedway rider. Barker earned six international caps for the Great Britain national speedway team/

== Career summary ==
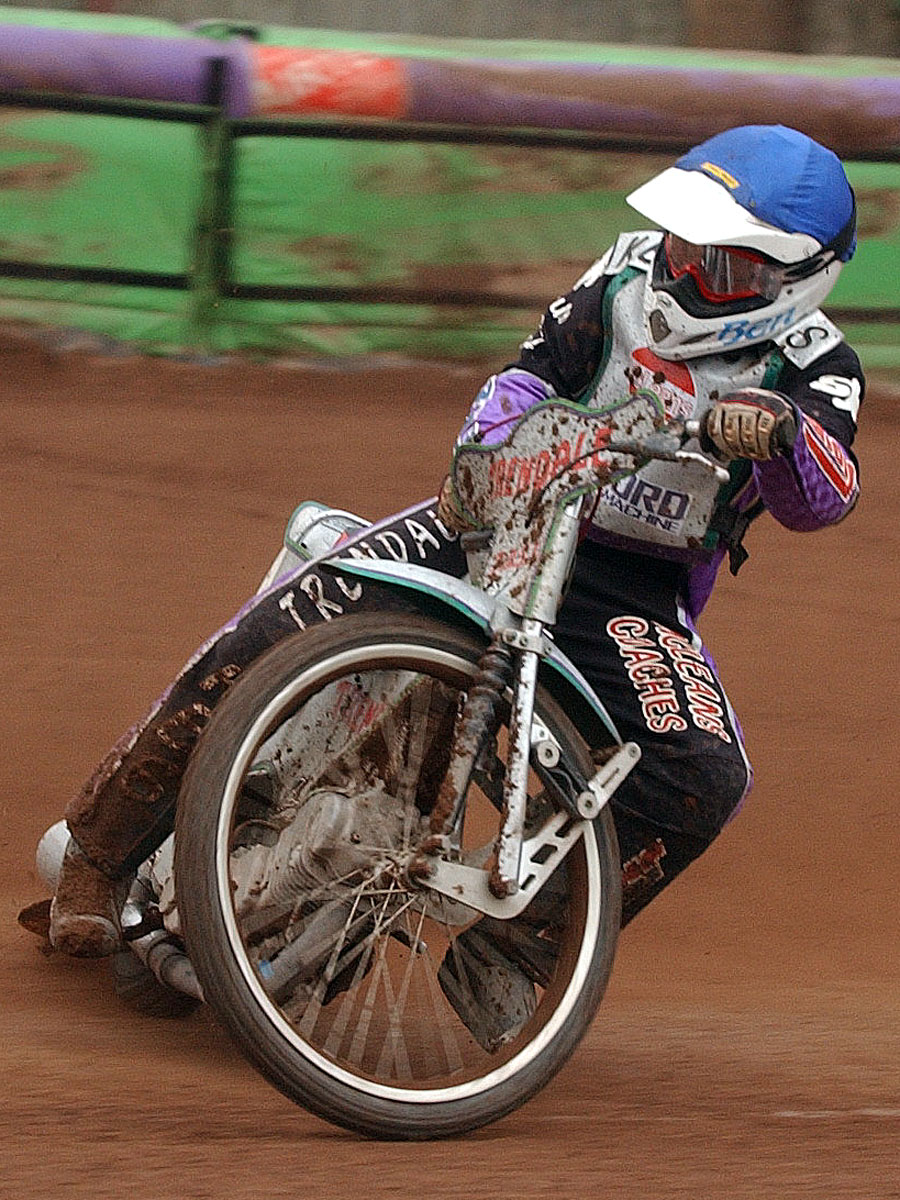
Barker riding for Oxford in 2004

Barker signed for Stoke Potters in December 2006 after impressing for the Stoke club's Conference League side, Stoke Spitfires, he was part of the Spitfires team that won the Conference League Four-Team Championship, held on 24 June 2006 at Loomer Road Stadium. In October 2006, Barker finished in third place in the British Under-18 Championship. In April 2007, a month after his 19th birthday, he reached the final of the British Under-21 Championship, finishing fourth.

Barker represented Great Britain at Under-21 level, at the 2006 Team Speedway Junior World Championship. He also competed in the 2007 Individual Speedway Junior World Championship finishing seventh in Qualifying Round B at Goričan on 12 May 2007, before going out of the competition on 17 June in Semi Final B at Daugavpils, where he finished 14th.

Barker returned to the Coventry Bees in the 2008 Elite League, after riding for the Coventry Cougars in the Conference Trophy during the 2004 season. In July 2008, he agreed a permanent move to the Bees as a full asset, and returned to them for the 2009 and 2010 seasons. He continued to ride in the top two tiers of British speedway riding for various clubs. In 2014, Barker rode for Plymouth Devils, then in 2015, he signed for Berwick Bandits but a back injury at the British Final at Wolverhampton looked set to end his season but he returned to ride for Peterborough Panthers at the end of the 2015 season. In 2016, he signed for Glasgow Tigers in the Premier League. He rode for Redcar Bears in 2018. After ten years as a Coventry asset, Barker was awarded a testimonial meeting to be held at his current club Redcar on 23 March 2019.

In 2022, Barker rode for the Ipswich in the SGB Premiership 2022 and for Plymouth in the SGB Championship 2022. His 2022 season was curtailed after he failed a random drug test before a race meeting. Although the Speedway Control Bureau have not released the details, his club Plymouth stated that the test showed positive for a strong dosage of Heroin and Zapain. In 2023, he re-signed for Plymouth for the SGB Championship 2023 following his return after a suspension. He later re-signed for Ipswich as well. His 2023 season culminated with a third place finish in the 2023 British Speedway Championship.

Barker re-signed for the Plymouth Gladiators for the 2024 season.

== Major results ==
=== World Championships ===
- Individual U-21 World Championship
  - 2007 - 14th place in Semi-final 2
  - 2008 - 10th place in Qualifying Round 5
  - 2009 - injury in Qualifying Round 1 and was replaced in Semi-Final 1
- Team U-21 World Championship (Under-21 Speedway World Cup)
  - 2006 - 3rd place in Qualifying Round 1
  - 2007 - started in Qualifying Round 2 only
  - 2008 - 3rd place in Qualifying Round 1
