= Joe Thompson (speedway rider) =

British motorcycle speedway rider

- Born: 22 April 2004 (age 22); Nuneaton, Warwickshire, England
- Nationality: British (English)

Career history
- 2019–2024: Leicester
- 2022: Wolverhampton
- 2023: Ipswich
- 2023: Poole
- 2024–2025: Plymouth

Team honours
- 2025: Premiership KO Cup (tier 1)
- 2019, 2022: tier 3 league champions
- 2019, 2022: tier 3 KO Cup winners
- 2022: tier 3 pairs winners

Joseph Thompson (born 22 April 2004) is a motorcycle speedway rider from England.

== Speedway career ==
Thompson began his speedway career riding for the Leicester Lion Cubs during the 2019 National Development League speedway season. In 2021, he broke into the Leicester Lions senior team for the SGB Championship 2021.

In 2022, Thompson continued to represent Leicester but made his debut for Wolverhampton Wolves (in the highest league in Britain) during the SGB Premiership 2022 season. He helped Leicester dominate the season by winning the league, successfully defending their National League Knockout Cup title (from 2019) and winning the Pairs Championship, partnered by his brother Dan.

In 2023, Thompson signed for Scunthorpe Scorpions for the SGB Championship 2023 following Leicester's move to the Premiership and re-signed for Leicester Lion Cubs for the 2023 National Development League speedway season. Following the injury sustained by Jack Thomas, Thompson was brought into the Ipswich Premiership team as their rising star but he was released by Scunthorpe following problems over the team averages before being drafted into the Poole Pirates team.

In 2024, Thompson signed for Leicester again (this time in the Premiership and NDL) for the 2024 season and joined the Plymouth Gladiators for the 2024 Championship season. Thompson lost his place to Sam Hagon as the rising star for Leicester in the Premiership but regained it later in the 2025 season and helped Leicester defeat King's Lynn to win the Knockout Cup.

== Family ==
Thompson's twin brother Dan also rides for Leicester Lion Cubs.
