= Dan Thompson (speedway rider) =

British speedway rider

- Born: 22 April 2004 (age 22); Nuneaton, Warwickshire, England
- Nationality: British (English)

Career history
- 2019-2023: Leicester
- 2022: Sheffield
- 2024–2025: Ipswich
- 2024: Plymouth
- 2025: Glasgow

Individual honours
- 2023: British Under-19 Championship

Team honours
- 2025: British champions
- 2019, 2022: National Development League
- 2019, 2022: National League Knock-out Cup
- 2022: National League Pairs

Daniel Thompson (born 22 April 2004) is a speedway rider from England.

== Speedway career ==
Along with his twin brother Joe, Thompson initially gained experience competing at junior level, and as a mascot for Leicester Lions. Thompson has raced in all three tiers of British Speedway. In 2019, he rode for the Leicester Lion Cubs before moving up to the Leicester Lions senior team for the 2021 SGB Championship season.

In 2022, Thompson continued to represent the Lions but also rode in the SGB Premiership for Sheffield Tigers, joining them as their number 8 rider. He helped the Lion Cubs dominate the season by winning the league, successfully defending their National League Knockout Cup title (from 2019) and winning the Pairs Championship, partnered by his brother Joe. In addition, he finished top of the NDL averages.

In 2023, Thompson re-signed for the Lions as they moved up a division for the SGB Premiership 2023 as their rising star and re-signed for Leicester Lion Cubs for the 2023 National Development League speedway season. Late in the 2023 season, he won the British Under-19 Championship.

Thompson signed for Ipswich Witches in the Premiership for the 2024 season. and joined the Plymouth Gladiators for the 2024 Championship season. The following season, he signed for Glasgow Tigers for the SGB Championship 2025.

In 2025, Thompson helped Ipswich win the SGB Premiership 2025.
