= Connor Bailey (speedway rider) =

Australian motorcycle speedway rider (born 2002)

- Born: 13 August 2002 (age 24); Perth, Western Australia, Australia
- Nationality: Australian-British

Career history
- 2019-2022: Glasgow
- 2019, 2022–2024: Belle Vue
- 2023–2024: Redcar
- 2023: Workington

Individual honours
- 2023: British U21 champion
- 2023: NDL Riders' Champion

Team honours
- 2022: British league champions

Connor Bailey (born 13 August 2002) is a speedway rider born in Australia, who is a British citizen.

== Career ==
In 2019, Bailey signed for the Glasgow Tigers in the SGB Championship 2019 and the Belle Vue Colts in the NDL.

Bailey remained with Glasgow for the 2021 and 2022 seasons. In 2022, he was named as the number 8 rider for Belle Vue Aces in the top tier of British Speedway, riding for the Aces in the SGB Premiership 2022 where he helped Belle Vue win the league title.

Bailey joined Redcar Bears for the SGB Championship 2023. and the Workington Comets for the 2023 National Development League speedway season.

Bailey won the U21 title at the 2023 British Speedway Championship and the National League Riders' Championship.

After making appearances for Belle Vue as their rising star for 2023, Bailey re-signed for Belle Vue for the 2024 season and for Redcar in the Championship.
