= Drew Kemp =

British motorcycle speedway rider (born 2002)

- Born: 11 August 2002 (age 24); Osnabrück, Germany
- Nationality: British

Career history

Great Britain
- 2018: Mildenhall
- 2018, 2020–2021: Ipswich
- 2018: Cradley
- 2019: Sheffield
- 2019: Kent
- 2020–2021: Eastbourne
- 2022: Wolverhampton
- 2022: Poole
- 2023: Scunthorpe
- 2024–2025: Leicester
- 2024–2025: Berwick

Poland
- 2021: Gdańsk
- 2023: Rawicz
- 2024: Łódź

Sweden
- 2025: Solkatterna

Individual honours
- 2017: British Youth Champion
- 2019, 2020, 2021: British Under-19 Champion

Team honours
- 2025: Premiership KO Cup
- 2022: tier 2 League champion
- 2022, 2023: tier 2 KO Cup winner
- 2019: tier 3 Pairs winner
- 2018, 2019: tier 3 National Trophy

Drew Kemp (born 11 August 2002) is a British motorcycle speedway rider.

== Career ==
In 2019, riding for Kent Kings, Kemp won the Division 3 Pairs with Anders Rowe, the National Trophy and finished runner-up in the NDL Riders' Championship behind his teammate Rowe. He reached the final of the 2019 U19 European Championship.

Kemp joined Eastbourne Eagles on 19 November 2019, for their 2020 SGB Championship season. It was confirmed, on 18 February 2020, that he would ride for his hometown club Ipswich Witches in the SGB Premiership. He was brought into the side after the suicide of his former Mildenhall Fen Tigers teammate Danny Ayres. However the season was curtailed by the COVID-19 pandemic.

Kemp rode for the Ipswich Witches for the SGB Premiership 2021 and the Eastbourne Eagles for the SGB Championship 2021. The following year in 2022, he rode for the Wolverhampton Wolves in the SGB Premiership 2022 and for the Poole Pirates in the SGB Championship 2022. Kemp was part of the Poole team that successfully defended their tier 2 League and KO Cup double crown.

In 2023, Kemp was signed by Scunthorpe Scorpions after losing his place at Poole but helped the Scorpions win the Knockout Cup.

For the 2024 season, Kemp signed for the Leicester Lions (Premiership) and Berwick Bandits (Championship) but later switched to Oxford from Leicester.

In 2025, Kemp helped Leicester defeat King's Lynn to win the Knockout Cup.
