= 2009 Elite League speedway season =

British motorcycle speedway season

- League: Sky Sports Elite League
- Champions: Wolverhampton Wolves
- Knockout Cup: Lakeside Hammers
- Elite Shield: Eastbourne Eagles
- Individual: Leigh Adams
- Pairs: Poole Pirates
- Highest average: Freddie Lindgren
- Division/s below: 2009 Premier League; 2009 National League

The 2009 Elite League speedway season (also known as the Sky Sports Elite League for sponsorship reasons) was the 75th season of the top division of UK speedway and the 13th since its establishment as the Elite League in 1997.

== Summary ==
The first fixtures of the season took place on 30 March and the season ended on 12 October. The Poole Pirates were the defending champions from 2008.

Leigh Adams had a stellar season, he once again topped the league averages and became the Australian Champion for the 10th time. He also won the Elite League Riders Championship and nearly led Swindon to a title success, before losing in the play off final to Wolverhampton Wolves. Wolves continued their success of recent years courtesy of heavy scoring throughout the season by Freddie Lindgren, Peter Karlsson and their new signing Tai Woffinden.

Lee Richardson top scored for the Lakeside Hammers during the season and the team claimed their first top tier trophy in their history when winning the Knockout Cup.

== League table ==
Pos	Club	M	Home				Away					F	A	+/-	Pts
Pos	Club	M	3W	2W	D	L	4W	3W	D	1L	L	F	A	+/-	Pts
1	Swindon Robins	32	15	0	0	1	5	3	0	5	3	1602	1331		79
2	Wolverhampton Wolves	32	15	1	0	0	4	2	1	4	5	1580	1361		75
3	Lakeside Hammers	32	9	4	2	1	2	1	1	4	9	1511	1437		54
4	Coventry Bees	32	7	5	2	2	2	2	1	3	8	1451	1456		52
5	Peterborough Panthers	32	10	4	0	2	0	2	0	3	11	1463	1484		47
6	Ipswich Witches	32	9	3	0	4	1	0	1	2	12	1431	1498		41
7	Eastbourne Eagles	32	9	0	1	6	0	1	2	1	12	1393	1527		36
8	Poole Pirates	32	5	3	2	6	1	0	1	3	11	1391	1526		32
9	Belle Vue Aces	32	4	6	0	6	1	1	0	1	13	1373	1575		32

Key:
Championship play-offs
Relegation play-offs

Home: 3W = Home win by 7 points or more; 2W = Home win by between 1 and 6 points
Away: 4W = Away win by 7 points or more; 3W = Away win by between 1 and 6 points; 1L = Away loss by 6 points or less
M = Meetings; D = Draws; L = Losses; F = Race points for; A = Race points against; +/- = Race points difference; Pts = Total Points

=== 'A' Fixtures ===
Home \ Away	BV	COV	EAS	IPS	LH	PET	PP	SWI	WOL
Belle Vue Aces		36–53	57–39	45–44	49–44	44–46	45–43	40–50	54–42
Coventry Bees	53–42		55–38	55–36	47–43	44–39	50–43	43–47	45–45
Eastbourne Eagles	54–42	49–41		52–40	55–41	50–43	51–44	50–41	45–47
Ipswich Witches	49–40	44–46	53–37		46–44	48–45	51–41	38–53	51–40
Lakeside Hammers	51–42	48–42	57–36	54–42		54–41	47–46	53–42	47–42
Peterborough Panthers	54–39	59–35	53–40	53–40	43–50		53–38	46–44	41–49
Poole Pirates	46–44	32–63	36–36	59–33	52–41	52–41		49–41	39–54
Swindon Robins	59–34	56–39	49–41	64–28	54–36	53–40	56–39		50–42
Wolverhampton Wolves	59–35	50–40	55–39	53–39	52–41	58–37	58–34	53–41	

Legend: Blue = home team win; Yellow = draw; Red = away team win.

=== 'B' Fixtures ===
Home \ Away	BV	COV	EAS	IPS	LH	PET	PP	SWI	WOL
Belle Vue Aces		49–43	49–41	44–52	46–44	45–43	53–42	41–49	37–57
Coventry Bees	50–40		45–45	46–44	54–40	49–41	46–43	41–49	47–43
Eastbourne Eagles	41–49	52–44		45–45	50–43	44–46	41–48	40–50	39–51
Ipswich Witches	56–37	48–42	55–35		39–53	60–36	57–38	42–48	49–41
Lakeside Hammers	60–33	45–45	55–37	51–42		60–33	45–45	48–45	42–48
Peterborough Panthers	58–38	59–34	48–42	54–42	51–39		55–38	47–43	51–45
Poole Pirates	44–46	43–46	44–46	53–40	45–45	49–41		43–47	46–44
Swindon Robins	56–39	54–39	51–41	55–37	43–47	62–30	55–40		51–39
Wolverhampton Wolves	53–39	54–39	50–42	49–41	50–43	56–40	54–38	47–43	

Legend: Blue = home team win; Yellow = draw; Red = away team win.

== Championship play-offs ==
Semi-finals

Leg 1

21 September 2009	Coventry Bees	45 – 45+8	Swindon Robins	Brandon stadium, Brandon
Rory Schlein 11	Leigh Adams 10

21 September 2009	Wolverhampton Wolves	56+4 - 40	Lakeside Hammers	Monmore Green, Wolverhampton
Ty Proctor 12+4	Jonas Davidsson 15

Leg 2

28 September 2009	Swindon Robins	47 (100) - (88) 43	Coventry Bees	Abbey Stadium, Swindon
Matej Zagar 12	Chris Harris 14

28 September 2009	Lakeside Hammers	44 (84) - (106) 46	Wolverhampton Wolves	Arena Essex Raceway, Purfleet
Jonas Davidsson 13	Adam Skornicki 12+2

Grand final

First leg

4 October 2009; 19.30	Wolverhampton Wolves	54 - 38	Swindon Robins	Monmore Green, Wolverhampton
Freddie Lindgren 14+1	Matej Zagar 9+1

1	(Sweden) Freddie Lindgren	3, 3, 2', 3, 3	14+1
2	(Denmark) Nicolai Klindt	1, 1, 0, 3	5
3	(Poland) Adam Skornicki	3, 3, 1', 3	10+1
4	(England) Tai Woffinden	F, 2', 2, 3	7+1
5	(Sweden) Peter Karlsson	2, 3, 3, 2', 0	10+1
6	(United States) Chris Kerr	3, 0, 0	3
7	(Australia) Ty Proctor	1, F, 1, 2', 1	5+1
Manager: Peter Adams

1	(Australia) Leigh Adams	2, 1, 2, 1, 2	8
2	(United States) Ryan Fisher	0, 0, 3, 1'	4+1
3	(Australia) Travis McGowan	1', 1', 0, 0	2+2
4	(England) Simon Stead	2, 2, 1, 4^	9
5	(Slovenia) Matej Zagar	3, 2, 3, 0^, 1'	9+1
6	(England) Paul Hurry	0, 0, 0	0
7	(Denmark) Morten Risager	2, 1, 2', 1, 0	6+1
Manager: Alun Rossiter

Second leg

12 October 2009; 19.30	Swindon Robins	52 (90) - (95) 41	Wolverhampton Wolves	Abbey Stadium, Swindon
Leigh Adams 12+1; Matej Zagar 12+1	Freddie Lindgren 16+1

1	(Australia) Leigh Adams	2, 3, 3, 2, 2'	12+1
3	(Australia) Travis McGowan	1', 1, 3, 2'	7+2
2	(United States) Ryan Fisher	2, 0, 1', 2	5+1
4	(England) Simon Stead	0, 3, 2, 2	7
5	(Slovenia) Matej Zagar	3, 2, 3, 1', 3	12+1
6	(Australia) Cory Gathercole	1, 0, 1	2
7	(Denmark) Morten Risager	3, 0, 2', 1', 1'	7+3
Manager: Alun Rossiter

1	(Sweden) Freddie Lindgren	3, 2, 2, 3, 0	10
2	(Denmark) Nicolai Klindt	0, 1', 0, 0	1+1
3	(Poland) Adam Skornicki	1, 1, 1, 6^	9
4	(England) Tai Woffinden	3, 3, 0, 3, 1	10
5	(Sweden) Peter Karlsson	2, 2, 3, 0	7
6	(United States) Chris Kerr	0, 0, 0	0
7	(Australia) Ty Proctor	2, 1', 1, 0, 0	4+1

Wolverhampton were declared Elite League Champions, on Aggregate 95-90.

== Knockout Cup ==
The 2009 Elite League Knockout Cup was the 71st edition of the Knockout Cup for tier one teams.

First round

Date	Team one	Score	Team two
29/05	Ipswich	45-48	Belle Vue
20/04	Belle Vue	53-40	Ipswich

Quarter-finals

Date	Team one	Score	Team two
26/03	Peterborough	43-47	Coventry
27/03	Coventry	53-37	Peterborough
26/03	Swindon	57-36	Wolverhampton
06/04	Wolverhampton	53-40	Swindon
27/03	Lakeside	57-38	Eastbourne
28/03	Eastbourne	50-43	Lakeside
24/06	Poole	44-49	Belle Vue
27/06	Belle Vue	54-41	Poole

Semi-finals

Date	Team one	Score	Team two
21/08	Coventry	51-39	Belle Vue
05/10	Belle Vue	48-42	Coventry
12/06	Lakeside	49-41	Swindon
11/06	Swindon	44-46	Lakeside

=== Final ===
First leg

14 October 2009

Lakeside Hammers; Adam Shields 15; Lee Richardson 12; Stuart Robson 10; Jonas Davidsson 9 Kauko Nieminen 8 Joonas Kylmäkorpi 4 Tom P. Madsen 1	59 - 36	Coventry Bees; Edward Kennett 12; Ben Barker 11; Rory Schlein 5 Josh Auty 4 Oliver Allen 2 Chris Harris 2 Jordan Frampton 0	Arena Essex Raceway

Second leg

23 October 2009

Coventry Bees; Chris Harris 11; Edward Kennett 9 Ben Barker 9 Josh Auty 6 Ricky Wells 4 Oliver Allen 2	41 - 49	Lakeside Hammers; Adam Shields 16; Kauko Nieminen 11; Jonas Davidsson 7 Lee Richardson 6 Stuart Robson 6 Tom P. Madsen 3	Brandon Stadium

The Lakeside Hammers were declared Knockout Cup Champions, winning on aggregate 108-77.

== Riders' Championship ==
Leigh Adams won the Riders' Championship. The final was held at Brandon Stadium on 2 October.

Pos.	Rider	Pts	Total	SF	Final
1	(Australia) Leigh Adams	3 3 3 0 3	12	2	3
2	(England) Chris Harris	2 3 2 3 3	13	x	2
3	(Australia) Chris Holder	3 1 3 3 3	13	x	1
4	(Sweden) Freddie Lindgren	2 3 3 2 1	11	3	0
5	(England) Edward Kennett	3 3 1 1 2	10	1	
6	(England) Scott Nicholls	2 2 3 1 3	11	0	
7	(Slovenia) Matej Žagar	2 0 2 3 2	9		
8	(Denmark) Niels Kristian Iversen	3 2 1 2 1	9		
9	(Denmark) Hans Andersen	1 2 2 2 1	8		
10	(Poland) Robert Miśkowiak	1 1 0 3 2	7		
11	(Poland) Adam Skórnicki	1 0 2 2	5		
12	(Denmark) Mads Korneliussen	1 2 1 0 0	4		
13	(Australia) Davey Watt	1 0 1 1 0	3		
14	(Sweden) Jonas Davidsson	0 0 2 0 0	2		
15	(England) James Wright	0 1 0 0	1		
16	(England) Josh Auty	0 1	1		
17	(England) Joe Haines (res)	0 1	1		

== Pairs ==
The Elite League Pairs Championship was held at the Arlington Stadium on 8 August and was won by Poole Pirates.

Pos	Team	Pts	Riders
1	Lakeside	24	Richardson 19, Davidsson 9
2	Poole	22	Andersen 19, Holder 13
3	Coventry	21	Harris 15, Kennett 10
4	Eastbourne	21	Watt 20, Bridger 10
5	Wolves	19	Lindgren 11, Karlsson 8
6	Peterborough	18	Iversen 12 Bjerre 6
7	Ipswich	15	Batchelor 8, Nicholls 7
8	Swindon	11	Adams 9, McGowan 2
9	Belle Vue	8	Wright J 4, Risager 4

Semi finals

- Eastbourne 5 Lakeside 4 - Richardson, Watt, Bridger, Davidsson
- Poole 5 Coventry 4 - Harris, Holder, Andersen, Kennett

Final

- Poole 5 Eastbourne 4 - Watt, Holder, Andersen, Bridger

== Final leading averages ==
Rider	Team	Average
(Sweden) Freddie Lindgren	Wolverhampton	10.64
(Australia) Leigh Adams	Swindon	10.33
(Denmark) Hans Andersen	Poole	9.77
(Slovenia) Matej Žagar	Swindon	9.57
(England) Scott Nicholls	Ipswich	9.39
(Poland) Jarosław Hampel	Ipswich	9.30
(Australia) Chris Holder	Poole	9.19
(Sweden) Peter Karlsson	Wolverhampton	9.19
(England) Lee Richardson	Lakeside	8.86
(England) Chris Harris	Coventry	8.74

== Riders & final averages ==
Belle Vue

- (Australia) Jason Crump 11.48 (5 matches only)
- (Poland) Krzysztof Kasprzak 8.67
- (Australia) Kevin Doolan 7.09
- (Denmark) Patrick Hougaard 6.65
- (Denmark) Charlie Gjedde 6.41
- (Denmark) Henning Bager 6.40
- (England) James Wright 6.38
- (Denmark) Ulrich Østergaard 6.12
- (Denmark) Morten Risager 6.11
- (England) Steve Boxall 4.18
- (Australia) Joel Parsons 2.95
- (Czech Republic) Luboš Tomíček Jr. 2.15

Coventry

- (England) Chris Harris 8.74
- (England) Edward Kennett 8.58
- (England) Scott Nicholls 8.28
- (England) Ben Barker 7.68
- (Australia) Rory Schlein 7.59
- (England) Oliver Allen 6.65
- (England) Jordan Frampton 4.72
- (England) Josh Auty 4.30
- (Czech Republic) Filip Šitera 4.24
- (United States) Ricky Wells 2.72

Eastbourne

- (Australia) Davey Watt 7.63
- (England) Lewis Bridger 7.46
- (Sweden) Simon Gustafsson 6.86
- (Australia) Cameron Woodward 6.64
- (Czech Republic) Lukáš Dryml 6.09
- (England) David Norris 5.65
- (Sweden) Ricky Kling 5.08
- (England) Chris Schramm 3.90

Ipswich

- (England) Scott Nicholls 9.39
- (Poland) Jarosław Hampel 9.30
- (Australia) Troy Batchelor 8.00
- (Poland) Robert Miśkowiak 8.27
- (England) Danny King 7.40
- (Poland) Piotr Świderski 6.23
- (Germany) Tobias Kroner 6.11
- (Denmark) Morten Risager 4.86
- (Poland) Dawid Stachyra 4.64
- (England) Leigh Lanham 4.21
- (England) Carl Wilkinson 4.16

Lakeside

- (England) Lee Richardson 8.86
- (Sweden) Jonas Davidsson 8.72
- (Australia) Adam Shields 8.46
- (Poland) Piotr Świderski 8.36
- (Finland) Joonas Kylmäkorpi 6.78
- (Finland) Kauko Nieminen 6.26
- (England) Stuart Robson 5.23
- (England) Phil Morris 4.97
- (England) Robert Mear 3.78

Peterborough

- (Denmark) Kenneth Bjerre 8.26
- (Denmark) Niels Kristian Iversen 8.12
- (Denmark) Mads Korneliussen 6.88
- (Denmark) Kenneth Hansen 6.80
- (Czech Republic) Aleš Dryml Jr. 5.71
- (Denmark) Henning Bager 5.50
- (Denmark) Claus Vissing 5.02

Poole

- (Denmark) Hans N. Andersen 9.77
- (Australia) Chris Holder 9.19
- (Denmark) Bjarne Pedersen 8.31
- (England) Joe Screen 7.07
- (Sweden) Daniel Davidsson 4.31
- (Denmark) Leon Madsen 4.00
- (England) Paul Hurry 3.85
- (Poland) Tomasz Piszcz 3.79
- (England) Steve Boxall 3.41
- (England) Ben Wilson 3.15
- (Poland) Łukasz Jankowski 2.14

Swindon

- (Australia) Leigh Adams 10.33
- (Slovenia) Matej Žagar 9.57
- (England) Simon Stead 7.38
- (Australia) Troy Batchelor 7.22
- (United States) Ryan Fisher 7.12
- (Australia) Travis McGowan 6.88
- (Denmark) Morten Risager 6.59
- (Australia) Cory Gathercole 6.31
- (Croatia) Jurica Pavlic 6.00
- (Poland) Krzysztof Stojanowski 4.36
- (England) Paul Hurry 4.12

Wolverhampton

- (Sweden) Freddie Lindgren 10.64
- (Sweden) Peter Karlsson 9.19
- (England) Tai Woffinden 8.30
- (Poland) Adam Skórnicki 7.27
- (Australia) Ty Proctor 6.03
- (Denmark) Nicolai Klindt 5.88
- (United States) Chris Kerr 2.77
- (Czech Republic) Hynek Štichauer 1.88

== See also ==
- Speedway in the United Kingdom
- List of United Kingdom Speedway League Champions
- Knockout Cup (speedway)
