= 2011 Elite League speedway season =

British motorcycle speedway season

- League: 2011 Sky Sports Elite League
- Champions: Poole Pirates
- Knockout Cup: Poole Pirates
- Elite Shield: Wolverhampton Wolves
- Individual: Rory Schlein
- Pairs: Poole Pirates
- Highest average: Darcy Ward
- Division/s below: 2011 Premier League; 2011 National League

The 2011 Elite League speedway season (also known as the Sky Sports Elite League for sponsorship reasons) was the 77th season of the top division of UK speedway and took place between 26 March and 20 October 2011. The Coventry Bees were the defending champions after winning in 2010.

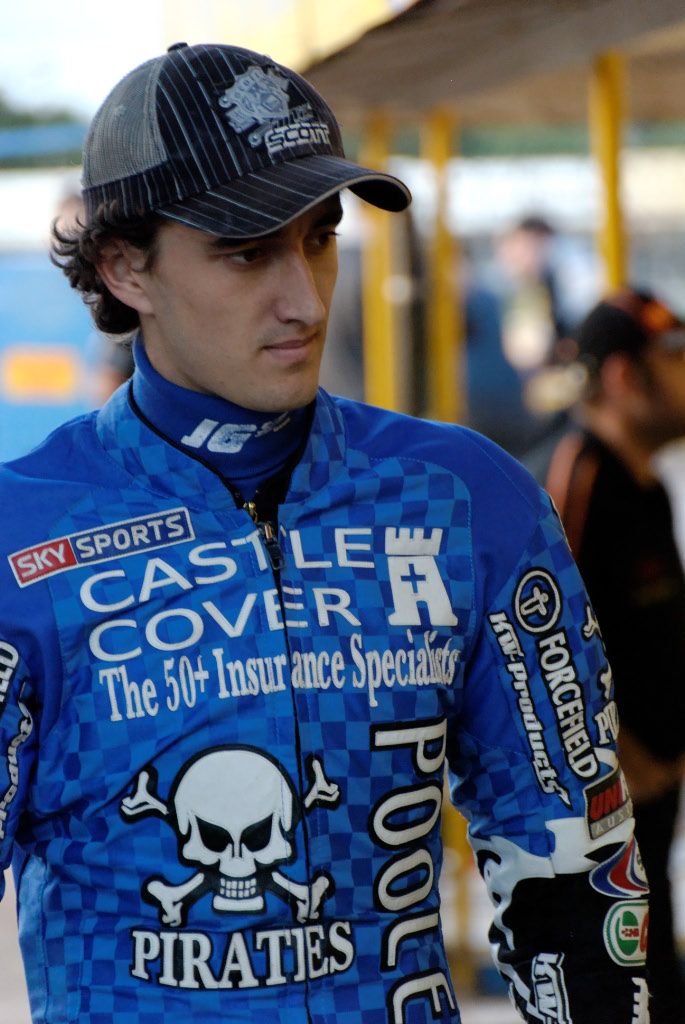
Poole rider and pairs champion

== Summary ==
It was a great season for the Poole Pirates, who won the Elite League, the Pairs Championship and the Knockout Cup. Claiming a clean sweep of honours. Throughout the 2010 season, it was rumoured that the Ipswich Witches would prefer to compete in the Premier League from 2011 onwards. Although they survived the promotion/relegation battle with the Newcastle Diamonds, it was decided that they would swap divisions with the Birmingham Brummies. On 27 November 2010, The BSPA announced that both Coventry Bees and Peterborough Panthers would not be riding in the top flight after they failed to declare their intent to compete in the 2011 competition. This then led to the King's Lynn Stars being promoted from the Premier League due to the Elite League needing a minimum of 8 teams. On 15 March 2011 it was announced that both the Coventry Bees and Peterborough Panthers would be part of the 2011 Elite League after all.

Poole Pirates made up for the previous season's disappointment by winning the league and cup double. The Australian quartet of Darcy Ward, Chris Holder, Davey Watt and Jason Doyle were supported well by Swedes Thomas H. Jonasson and Dennis Andersson as the Poole team deservedly won the title after finishing top of the regular season table for the second consecutive year. The Australian domination also extended to the league averages, which were topped by Chris Holder and the Elite League Riders' Championship won by Rory Schlein of Belle Vue.

== League table ==
Pos	Club	M	Home				Away					F	A	+/-	Pts
Pos	Club	M	3W	2W	D	L	4W	3W	D	1L	L	F	A	+/-	Pts
1	Poole Pirates	28	10	3	0	1	2	3	0	5	4	1343	1212		58
2	Eastbourne Eagles	28	12	1	0	1	0	4	0	2	8	1370	1202		52
3	King's Lynn Stars	28	8	4	0	2	0	3	1	6	4	1305	1266		49
4	Lakeside Hammers	28	8	5	0	1	1	2	0	2	9	1291	1255		46
5	Coventry Bees	28	9	2	1	2	0	2	1	3	8	1262	1267		43
6	Peterborough Panthers	28	10	4	0	0	0	0	0	4	10	1284	1271		42
7	Belle Vue Aces	28	5	3	2	4	2	2	0	4	6	1267	1266		41
8	Wolverhampton Wolves	28	5	8	0	1	0	0	1	5	8	1250	1326		38
9	Birmingham Brummies	28	6	4	0	4	1	0	0	5	8	1241	1326		35
10	Swindon Robins	28	2	5	0	7	0	1	0	3	10	1172	1394		22

Key:
Championship play-offs

Home: 3W = Home win by 7 points or more; 2W = Home win by between 1 and 6 points
Away: 4W = Away win by 7 points or more; 3W = Away win by between 1 and 6 points; 1L = Away loss by 6 points or less
M = Meetings; D = Draws; L = Losses; F = Race points for; A = Race points against; +/- = Race points difference; Pts = Total Points

=== 'A' Fixtures ===
Home \ Away	BV	BIR	COV	EAS	KL	LH	PET	PP	SWI	WOL
Belle Vue Aces		50–42	45–45	44–45	52–42	43–47	53–40	44–46	62–30	47–43
Birmingham Brummies	43–47		51–39	43–49	52–38	52–40	49–44	42–48	48–42	48–47
Coventry Bees	56–38	48–45		46–39	49–44	58–34	54–38	49–42	42–48	50–43
Eastbourne Eagles	54–39	66–24	53–40		45–48	50–43	55–41	57–39	59–34	57–38
King's Lynn Stars	48–42	50–43	50–40	43–46		65–30	55–41	50–43	58–37	50–43
Lakeside Hammers	48–45	61–31	42–30	44–46	61–32		55–41	48–42	56–38	48–45
Peterborough Panthers	50–24	50–37	46–44	52–38	48–45	50–42		49–44	63–27	59–34
Poole Pirates	47–42	48–42	55–31	55–39	58–36	58–36	55–35		50–42	56–36
Swindon Robins	41–49	42–51	50–40	51–41	42–48	43–47	47–43	49–43		50–45
Wolverhampton Wolves	56–36	46–43	48–42	46–44	47–43	53–42	51–38	42–51	48–42	

Legend: Blue = home team win; Yellow = draw; Red = away team win.

=== 'B' Fixtures ===
Home \ Away	BV	BIR	COV	EAS	KL	LH	PET	PP	SWI	WOL
Belle Vue Aces		45–44	n/a	n/a	47–43	58–35	n/a	44–46	n/a	45–45
Birmingham Brummies	52–43		48–42	n/a	n/a	38–54	50–43	n/a	n/a	57–36
Coventry Bees	41–49	n/a		51–42	45–45	n/a	49–41	n/a	56–37	n/a
Eastbourne Eagles	n/a	n/a	53–40		46–44	n/a	n/a	57–35	59–34	63–29
King's Lynn Stars	48–42	n/a	44–48	50–42		n/a	47–43	n/a	48–45	n/a
Lakeside Hammers	48–41	51–42	n/a	n/a	n/a		66–26	40–38	n/a	47–46
Peterborough Panthers	n/a	53–41	54–40	n/a	46–44	53–40		n/a	54–36	n/a
Poole Pirates	45–48	n/a	n/a	54–40	n/a	44–43	n/a		53–41	54–42
Swindon Robins	n/a	n/a	43–47	46–44	43–47	n/a	49–43	43–50		n/a
Wolverhampton Wolves	52–41	48–45	n/a	49–41	n/a	47–43	n/a	45–44	n/a	

Legend: Blue = home team win; Yellow = draw; Red = away team win.

== Championship play-offs ==
=== Semi-finals ===
Leg 1

19 September 2011

King's Lynn Stars	48 – 45	Poole Pirates

Norfolk Arena
19 September 2011

Lakeside Hammers	47 – 46	Eastbourne Eagles

Arena Essex Raceway

Leg 2

26 September 2011

Poole Pirates	63 – 27	King's Lynn Stars

Poole Stadium
26 September 2011

Eastbourne Eagles	53 - 39	Lakeside Hammers

Arlington Stadium

=== Grand final ===
First leg

3 October 2011

Eastbourne Eagles Cameron Woodward 14 Bjarne Pedersen 9 Simon Gustafsson 8 Joonas Kylmäkorpi 8 Lewis Bridger 5 Timo Lahti 5	49 - 41	Poole Pirates Chris Holder 12 Darcy Ward 10 Davey Watt 9 Kevin Wölbert 5 Dennis Andersson 3 Ricky Wells 2 Thomas H. Jonasson 0

Arlington Stadium

Second leg

10 October 2011

Poole Pirates Darcy Ward 14 Chris Holder 11 Thomas H. Jonasson 11 Davey Watt 6 Kevin Wölbert 5 Dennis Andersson 5 Ricky Wells 5	57 - 36	Eastbourne Eagles Cameron Woodward 14 Simon Gustafsson 8 Joonas Kylmäkorpi 5 Lewis Bridger 4 Bjarne Pedersen 4 Timo Lahti 1

Poole Stadium

Poole Pirates were declared Elite League Champions, on winning on aggregate 98-85.

== Elite League Knockout Cup ==
The 2011 Elite League Knockout Cup was the 73rd edition of the Knockout Cup for tier one teams. Poole Pirates were the winners of the competition for the second successive year.

First round

Date	Team one	Score	Team two
08/08	Peterborough	47-45	Coventry
06/07	Coventry	42-48	Peterborough

Quarter-finals

Date	Team one	Score	Team two
15/09	Peterborough	43-47	Belle Vue
14/09	Belle Vue	50-40	Peterborough
25/07	Wolverhampton	45-45	Eastbourne
22/06	Poole	55-41	Swindon
18/06	Eastbourne	50-40	Wolverhampton
16/06	Swindon	28-62	Poole
10/06	Lakeside	63- 29	Birmingham
09/06	Birmingham	36-41	Lakeside

Semi-finals

Date	Team one	Score	Team two
12/10	Belle Vue	42-33	Lakeside
30/09	Lakeside	48-45	Belle Vue
17/09	Eastbourne	39-51	Poole
14/09	Poole	46-44	Eastbourne

=== Final ===
First leg

20 October 2011

Belle Vue Aces Rory Schlein 12 Chris Harris 9 Ricky Kling 8 Charlie Gjedde 7 Patrick Hougaard 4 Craig Cook 4 Linus Eklöf 3	47 - 45	Poole Pirates Kevin Wölbert 13 Darcy Ward 10 Chris Holder 9 Dennis Andersson 7 Davey Watt 4 Ricky Wells 2

Belle Vue Stadium

Second leg

20 October 2011

Poole Pirates Chris Holder 13 Dennis Andersson 13 Darcy Ward 12 Kevin Wölbert 9 Davey Watt 7 Ricky Wells 3	57 - 39	Belle Vue Aces Rory Schlein 11 Chris Harris 8 Charlie Gjedde 6 Ricky Kling 6 Patrick Hougaard 4 Linus Eklöf 4 Craig Cook 0

Poole Stadium

The Poole Pirates were declared Knockout Cup Champions, winning on aggregate 102-86.

== Riders' Championship ==
Rory Schlein won the Riders' Championship. The final was held in Swindon on 15 October.

Pos.	Rider	Pts	Total	SF	Final
1	(Australia) Rory Schlein	3 3 2 3 2	13	x	3
2	(England) Scott Nicholls	1 1 3 3 3	11	2	2
3	(Sweden) Freddie Lindgren	3 2 2 exc 2	9	3	1
4	(Denmark) Bjarne Pedersen	3 2 3 0 3	11	x	0
5	(Australia) Chris Holder	2 0 3 3 1	9	1	
6	(England) Chris Harris	2 3 1 2 3	11	exc	
7	(Denmark) Kenneth Bjerre	0 3 1 3 1	8		
8	(Australia) Darcy Ward	2 3 f/exc 2 1	8		
9	(England) Ben Barker	1 2 1 1 2	7		
10	(Denmark) Niels Kristian Iversen	3 0 3 0 f	6		
11	(Denmark) Hans Andersen	0 1 0 1 3	5		
12	(England) Danny King	0 2 1 2 0	5		
13	(Denmark) Nicolai Klindt	0 1 2 1 fx	4		
14	(England) Lee Richardson	1 1 2 0 ret	4		
15	(England) Stuart Robson	1 0 0 1 2	4		
16	(United States) Ryan Fisher	2 ret 0 2 ret	2		

- f=fell, exc=excluded, ret=retired

== Pairs ==
The Elite League Pairs Championship was held at the King's Lynn Stadium on 27 April and was won by Poole Pirates.

Group A
Pos	Team	Pts	Riders
1	Peterborough	25	Batchelor 15, Pedersen 10
2	Wolves	21	Lindgren 14, Proctor 7
3	Swindon	21	Nicholls 13, Klindt 8
4	King's Lynn	14	Iversen 11, Bjerre 3
5	Birmingham	9	Dryml 9, Knight (G) 0

Group B
Pos	Team	Pts	Riders
1	Poole	26	Holder 14, Ward 12
2	Belle Vue	23	Harris 13, Schlein 10
3	Lakeside	19	Richardson 10, Shields 9
4	Coventry	12	Fisher 10, Kennett 2
5	Eastbourne	11	Kylmaekorpi 9, Woodward 2

Semi finals

- Belle Vue 5 Peterborough 4 - Pedersen, Harris, Schlein, Batchelor
- Poole 5 Wolves 4 - Lindgren, Ward, Holder, Proctor

Final

- Poole 7 Belle Vue 2 - Ward, Holder, Harris, Schlein

== Leading averages ==
Rider	Team	Average
(Australia) Darcy Ward	Poole	10.05
(Australia) Chris Holder	Poole	9.99
(Sweden) Freddie Lindgren	Wolverhampton	9.66
(Denmark) Kenneth Bjerre	Kings Lynn	9.22
(Denmark) Nicki Pedersen	Peterborough	9.20
(Australia) Rory Schlein	Belle Vue	9.10
(Australia) Troy Batchelor	Peterborough	8.84
(Sweden) Peter Karlsson	Wolverhampton	8.78
(England) Edward Kennett	Coventry	8.77
(Denmark) Bjarne Pedersen	Eastbourne	8.61

== Riders & final averages ==
Belle Vue

- (Australia) Rory Schlein 9.10
- (England) Chris Harris 8.56
- (Denmark) Charlie Gjedde 7.70
- (Denmark) Patrick Hougaard 6.48
- (England) Craig Cook 5.70
- (England) Jordan Frampton 5.60
- (Sweden) Ricky Kling 5.22
- (Australia) Kozza Smith 4.65
- (Poland) Łukasz Jankowski 4.48
- (Poland) Tomasz Piszcz 3.30
- (Poland) Dawid Stachyra 2.00

Birmingham

- (England) Ben Barker 7.65
- (Poland) Krzysztof Kasprzak 7.46
- (England) Danny King 6.84
- (Sweden) Daniel Nermark 6.52
- (Denmark) Ulrich Østergaard 6.16
- (Denmark) Claus Vissing 5.73
- (Czech Republic) Aleš Dryml 5.39
- (England) James Wright 5.33
- (Germany) Kevin Wölbert 5.10

Coventry

- (England) Edward Kennett 8.77
- (Russia) Emil Sayfutdinov 8.28
- (Poland) Przemyslaw Pawlicki 7.96
- (United States) Ryan Fisher 6.95
- (Denmark) Kenni Larsen 6.76
- (Australia) Nick Morris 6.06
- (England) Josh Auty 5.57
- (Australia) Travis McGowan 4.21
- (Australia) Richard Sweetman 3.88

Eastbourne

- (Denmark) Bjarne Pedersen 8.61
- (Finland) Joonas Kylmäkorpi 7.92
- (England) Lewis Bridger 7.75
- (Czech Republic) Lukáš Dryml 7.69
- (Sweden) Simon Gustafsson 7.22
- (Australia) Cameron Woodward 7.19
- (Finland) Timo Lahti 3.06

King's Lynn

- (Denmark) Kenneth Bjerre 9.22
- (Denmark) Mads Korneliussen 8.03
- (Denmark) Niels Kristian Iversen 7.88
- (England) Oliver Allen 7.30
- (Denmark) Lasse Bjerre 6.11
- (Australia) Sam Masters 4.48
- (Czech Republic) Filip Šitera 4.04
- (Czech Republic) Tomáš Topinka 4.00

Lakeside

- (England) Lee Richardson 8.46
- (Sweden) Jonas Davidsson 7.52
- (Poland) Piotr Swiderski 7.48
- (Australia) Adam Shields 7.26
- (England) Stuart Robson 6.99
- (Sweden) Kim Nilsson 6.52
- (Sweden) Peter Ljung 6.35
- (Finland) Kauko Nieminen 6.02
- (England) Robert Mear 5.67
- (Canada) Kyle Legault 4.21

Peterborough

- (Denmark) Nicki Pedersen 9.20
- (Australia) Troy Batchelor 8.84
- (Sweden) Linus Sundström 7.83
- (Poland) Krzysztof Buczkowski 6.82
- (Poland) Norbert Kościuch 6.02
- (Poland) Kacper Gomólski 4.47
- (Australia) Dakota North 4.00
- (England) Richard Lawson 3.87

Poole

- (Australia) Darcy Ward 10.05
- (Australia) Chris Holder 9.99
- (Australia) Davey Watt 7.93
- (Sweden) Thomas H. Jonasson 7.14
- (Australia) Jason Doyle 6.41
- (Sweden) Dennis Andersson 6.23
- (Germany) Kevin Wölbert 6.10
- (Russia) Renat Gafurov 5.62
- (Germany) Christian Hefenbrock 4.84
- (England) Kyle Newman 1.74

Swindon

- (England) Scott Nicholls 7.78
- (Denmark) Nicolai Klindt 7.02
- (England) Simon Stead 6.86
- (Poland) Maciej Janowski 6.72
- (Denmark) Jesper B. Monberg 6.19
- (Australia) Cory Gathercole 4.89
- (Russia) Sergei Darkin 3.63
- (Australia) Justin Sedgmen 2.83

Wolverhampton

- (Sweden) Freddie Lindgren 9.66
- (Sweden) Peter Karlsson 8.78
- (England) Tai Woffinden 8.34
- (Australia) Ty Proctor 5.76
- (Sweden) Ludvig Lindgren 4.56
- (United States) Ricky Wells 4.43

== See also ==
- List of United Kingdom Speedway League Champions
- Knockout Cup (speedway)
