= 2013 Elite League speedway season =

British motorcycle speedway season

- League: 2013 Sky Sports Elite League
- Champions: Poole Pirates
- Elite Shield: Swindon Robins
- Individual: Rory Schlein
- Knockout Cup: not held
- Highest average: Tai Woffinden
- Division/s below: 2013 Premier League; 2013 National League

The 2013 Elite League speedway season (also known as the Sky Sports Elite League for sponsorship reasons) was the 79th season of the top division of UK speedway and the took place between March and October 2013.

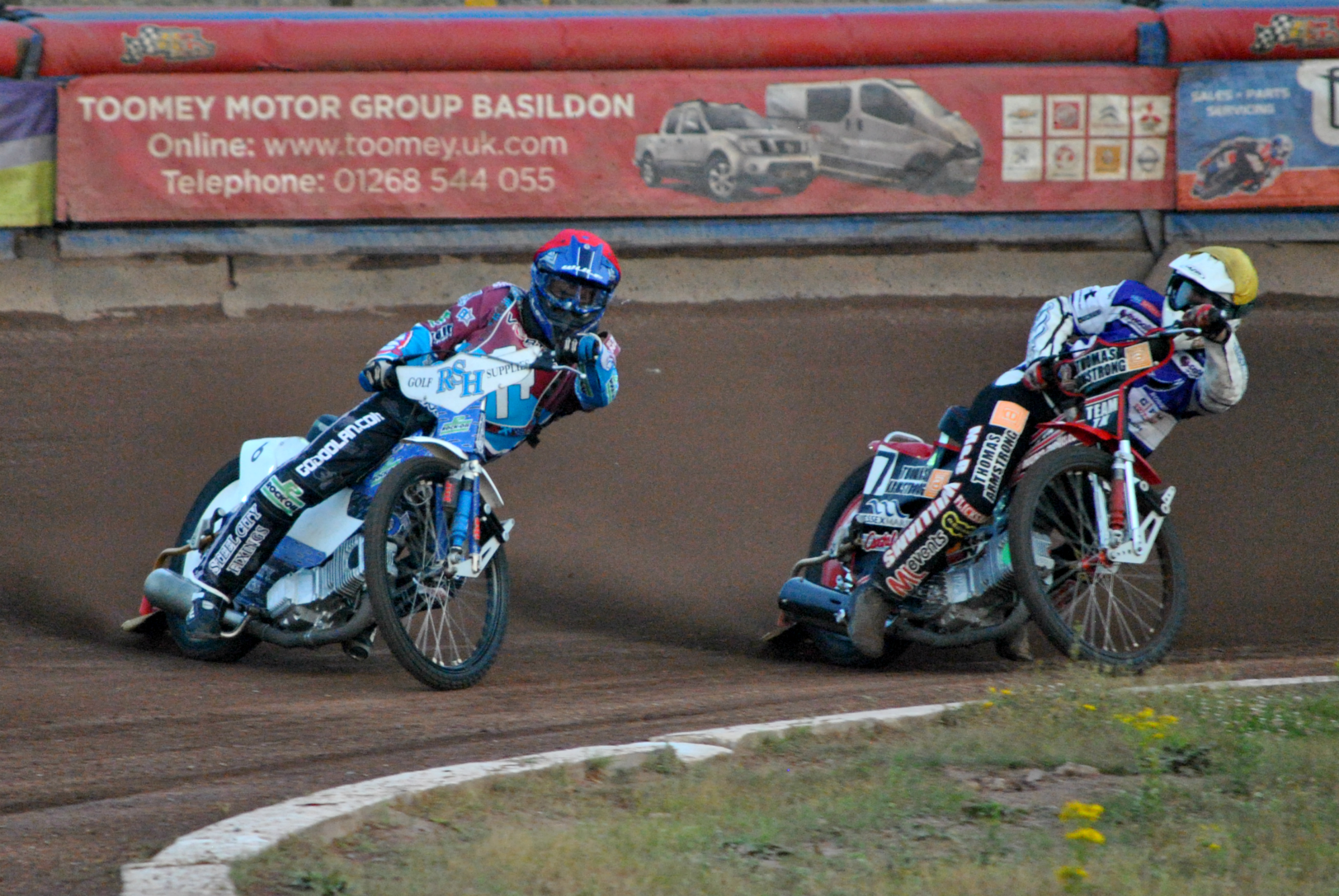
Lakeside vs Swindon during the 2013 season

== Summary ==
The Swindon Robins were the defending champions after winning in 2012.

Birmingham Brummies finished top of the regular season table but lost in the play off to Poole Pirates, who continued to enjoy British League success. It was their fifth success in ten years and was instrumented by their Australian duo Chris Holder and Darcy Ward and Poles Maciej Janowski and Przemysław Pawlicki.

== League table ==
Pos	Club	M	Home				Away					F	A	Pts
Pos	Club	M	3W	2W	D	L	4W	3W	D	1L	L	F	A	Pts
1	Birmingham Brummies	28	9	4	0	1	3	1	2	2	6	1344	1218	56
2	Swindon Robins	28	9	2	0	3	2	4	0	3	5	1353	1216	54
3	Wolverhampton Wolves	28	10	2	0	2	1	3	0	4	6	1319	1232	51
4	Poole Pirates	28	7	3	1	3	4	0	0	2	8	1291	1236	46
5	Kings Lynn Stars	28	9	3	0	2	1	0	0	6	7	1265	1273	43
6	Lakeside Hammers	28	11	1	0	2	1	1	0	1	11	1257	1307	43
7	Peterborough Panthers	28	8	1	1	4	2	1	0	2	9	1293	1245	40
8	Eastbourne Eagles	28	9	4	0	1	0	0	0	2	12	1240	1339	37
9	Belle Vue Aces*	28	7	1	0	6	0	3	1	1	9	1204	1309	32
10	Coventry Bees	28	6	3	1	4	1	0	0	1	12	1185	1376	30

Key:
Championship play-offs

- Belle Vue were deducted 3 points after a Speedway Control Bureau hearing.

Home: 3W = Home win by 7 points or more; 2W = Home win by between 1 and 6 points
Away: 4W = Away win by 7 points or more; 3W = Away win by between 1 and 6 points; 1L = Away loss by 6 points or less
M = Meetings; D = Draws; L = Losses; F = Race points for; A = Race points against; Pts = Total Points

=== 'A' Fixtures ===
Home \ Away	BV	BIR	COV	EAS	KL	LH	PET	PP	SWI	WOL
Belle Vue Aces		49–41	52–41	57–37	50–40	43–50	54–39	40–50	46–44	43–47
Birmingham Brummies	54–39		55–37	62–31	47–43	56–38	46–44	54–40	43–37	46–44
Coventry Bees	45–45	41–49		52–38	47–43	57–33	50–40	43–41	56–38	31–59
Eastbourne Eagles	60–33	51–41	51–39		53–39	52–41	54–36	53–42	48–42	47–46
King's Lynn Stars	52–38	50–40	49–41	51–39		48–42	41–33	49–41	54–40	53–37
Lakeside Hammers	52–38	48–42	55–40	49–40	53–39		51–39	60–32	43–47	53–39
Peterborough Panthers	45–47	45–45	37–56	54–39	40–50	58–36		59–34	40–50	55–38
Poole Pirates	53–39	46–46	56–38	53–39	48–45	45–48	39–51		49–41	42–48
Swindon Robins	60–33	45–47	59–36	49–43	49–46	63–27	54–38	50–43		54–38
Wolverhampton Wolves	59–33	41–49	56–36	59–34	53–39	50–40	51–43	45–44	46–44	

Legend: Blue = home team win; Yellow = draw; Red = away team win.

=== 'B' Fixtures ===
Home \ Away	BV	BIR	COV	EAS	KL	LH	PET	PP	SWI	WOL
Belle Vue Aces		n/a	59–35	n/a	n/a	n/a	49–41	28–35	42–47	42–48
Birmingham Brummies	n/a		61–35	48–46	n/a	51–42	n/a	n/a	52–44	57–33
Coventry Bees	51–39	40–49		n/a	48–46	n/a	40–50	n/a	n/a	50–43
Eastbourne Eagles	n/a	46–44	n/a		n/a	49–41	53–43	35–55	n/a	47–43
King's Lynn Stars	n/a	n/a	48–43	n/a		53–40	47–43	39–50	39–51	n/a
Lakeside Hammers	n/a	50–40	n/a	56–37	50–43		n/a	50–43	43–47	n/a
Peterborough Panthers	42–36	n/a	70–20	53–42	54–39	n/a		n/a	52–40	n/a
Poole Pirates	57–34	n/a	n/a	56–38	47–43	62–28	n/a		n/a	46–44
Swindon Robins	42–48	52–40	n/a	n/a	56–37	54–38	44–49	n/a		n/a
Wolverhampton Wolves	42–48	51–39	55–37	55–38	n/a	n/a	n/a	49–42	n/a	

Legend: Blue = home team win; Yellow = draw; Red = away team win.

== Championship play-offs ==
=== Semi-finals ===
Leg 1

23 September 2013

Wolverhampton Wolves	44 – 46	Birmingham Brummies

Monmore Green Stadium
23 September 2013

Swindon Robins	52 – 42	Poole Pirates

Swindon

Leg 2

30 September 2013

Birmingham Brummies	55 – 38	Wolverhampton Wolves

Perry Barr Stadium
30 September 2013

Poole Pirates	55 - 38	Swindon Robins

Wimborne Road

=== Grand final ===
First leg

7 October 2013

Poole Pirates Hancock 14 Ward 13 Grajczonek 10 Jonasson 9 Janowski 8 Newman 3	57 - 36	Birmingham Brummies Doyle 11 Harris 7 Barker 6 King 5 Covatti 3 Smolinski 2 Auty 2

Wimborne Road

Second leg

15 October 2013

Birmingham Brummies Doyle 12 Harris 10 Barker 7 Auty 7 Covatti 5 Smolinski 2 King 0	43 (79) - 47 (104)	Poole Pirates Ward 14 Grajczonek 13 Janowski 6 Newman 6 Hancock 5 Jonasson 3

Perry Barr Stadium

The Poole Pirates were declared Elite League Champions, winning on aggregate 104-79.

== Knockout Cup ==
The Knockout Cup was not held during 2013.

== Riders' Championship ==
Rory Schlein won the Riders' Championship for the second time. The final was held at Swindon on 19 October.

Pos.	Rider	Pts	Total	SF	Final
1	(Australia) Rory Schlein	ef 3 3 3	9	2	3
2	(Denmark) Niels Kristian Iversen	3 2 3 2	11	x	2
3	(England) Craig Cook	3 ef 3 3	9	x	1
4	(Denmark) Hans Andersen	3 1 2 2	8	3	ef
5	(Australia) Jason Doyle	3 3 2 1	9	1	
6	(Australia) Troy Batchelor	2 3 f/exc 2	7	0	
7	(England) Scott Nicholls	1 2 1 3	7		
8	(Denmark) Peter Kildemand	2 2 3 f/exc	7		
9	(Sweden) Freddie Lindgren	f 1 2 3	7		
10	(England) Chris Harris	2 2 2 0	6		
11	(Poland) Grzegorz Zengota	1 3 1 1	6		
12	(Denmark) Kenneth Bjerre	1 1 0 2	4		
13	(Australia) Davey Watt	2 0 ef	2		
14	(England) Oliver Greenwood (res)	0 1 1	2		
15	(Denmark) Bjarne Pedersen	ef 1	1		
16	(England) Paul Starke (res)	1 0	1		
17	(Poland) Krzysztof Buczkowski	ef ef ef 0	0		
18	(Australia) Darcy Ward	ef ef	0		

- f=fell, exc=excluded, ret=retired ef=engine failure

== Final leading averages ==
Rider	Team	Average
(England) Tai Woffinden	Wolverhampton	9.93
(Australia) Chris Holder	Poole	9.73
(Denmark) Niels Kristian Iversen	Kings Lynn	9.68
(Sweden) Freddie Lindgren	Wolverhampton	9.53
(Australia) Darcy Ward	Poole	9.44
(Denmark) Hans Andersen	Swindon	9.24
(Slovenia) Matej Žagar	Belle Vue	9.12
(Poland) Krzysztof Buczkowski	Peterborough	8.80
(Denmark) Kenneth Bjerre	Peterborough	8.78
(Australia) Ty Proctor	Wolverhampton	8.76

== Riders & averages ==
Belle Vue

- (Slovenia) Matej Žagar 9.12
- (England) Craig Cook 8.16
- (Germany) Kevin Wolbert 5.95
- (Sweden) Magnus Zetterström 5.53
- (Finland) Kauko Nieminen 5.39
- (Denmark) Ulrich Østergaard 4.96
- (Czech Republic) Aleš Dryml 4.85
- (Poland) Artur Mroczka 4.57

Birmingham

- (Australia) Jason Doyle 8.24
- (Germany) Martin Smolinski 8.00
- (England) Danny King 7.94
- (England) Ben Barker 7.29
- (England) Chris Harris 7.50
- (England) Josh Auty 5.77
- (Italy) Nicolas Covatti 5.46

Coventry

- (England) Scott Nicholls 7.88
- (Poland) Krzysztof Kasprzak 7.85
- (Poland) Grzegorz Zengota 6.73
- (England) Oliver Allen 4.41
- (Australia) Aaron Summers 5.47
- (Poland) Michał Szczepaniak 5.45
- (England) Stuart Robson 5.19
- (Poland) Mateusz Szczepaniak 3.11
- (England) Adam Roynon 2.15

Eastbourne

- (Denmark) Bjarne Pedersen 8.50
- (Australia) Cameron Woodward 7.32
- (Denmark) Mikkel Michelsen 6.70
- (Sweden) Kim Nilsson 6.23
- (Czech Republic) Lukáš Dryml 6.06
- (Sweden) Simon Gustafsson 5.68
- (Finland) Timo Lahti 5.54
- (Australia) Adam Shields 4.41
- (Russia) Denis Gizatullin 4.36

King's Lynn

- (Denmark) Niels Kristian Iversen 9.68
- (Denmark) Mads Korneliussen 7.64
- (England) Simon Stead 7.60
- (Australia) Rory Schlein 7.08
- (Denmark) Richie Worrall 6.53
- (Sweden) Sebastian Aldén 6.19
- (Australia) Kozza Smith 5.45
- (Denmark) Nicolai Klindt 5.19
- (Denmark) Lasse Bjerre 4.65
- (Denmark) Nicklas Porsing 4.00
- (Denmark) Andžejs Ļebedevs 3.65

Lakeside

- (Sweden) Peter Karlsson 8.52
- (Australia) Davey Watt 7.86
- (England) Lewis Bridger 7.01
- (Poland) Piotr Swiderski 6.84
- (Poland) Sebastian Ułamek 6.70
- (England) Richard Lawson 6.02
- (Sweden) Kim Nilsson 5.74
- (Australia) Kevin Doolan 4.94
- (England) Robert Mear 4.17

Peterborough

- (Poland) Krzysztof Buczkowski 8.80
- (Denmark) Kenneth Bjerre 8.78
- (Denmark) Kenni Larsen 7.82
- (Finland) Joonas Kylmäkorpi 7.62
- (Denmark) Patrick Hougaard 6.80
- (Sweden) Linus Sundström 6.59
- (United States) Ryan Fisher 6.41
- (Poland) Norbert Kościuch 5.46
- (Australia) Dakota North 4.87
- (Denmark) Nicolai Klindt 3.15

Poole

- (Australia) Chris Holder 9.73
- (Australia) Darcy Ward 9.44
- (United States) Greg Hancock 8.63
- (Poland) Maciej Janowski 7.44
- (Sweden) Thomas H. Jonasson 7.28
- (Australia) Josh Grajczonek 6.06
- (Australia) Rohan Tungate 5.33
- (Poland) Dawid Stachyra 4.56
- (England) Kyle Howarth 4.35
- (England) Micky Dyer 3.86

Swindon

- (Denmark) Hans N. Andersen 9.24
- (Denmark) Peter Kildemand 8.74
- (Australia) Troy Batchelor 8.32
- (England) Edward Kennett 7.37
- (Australia) Nick Morris 7.15
- (England) Kyle Howarth 6.03
- (Poland) Kacper Gomolski 5.22
- (England) Ashley Birks 3.46

Wolverhampton

- (England) Tai Woffinden 9.93
- (Sweden) Freddie Lindgren 9.53
- (Australia) Ty Proctor 8.76
- (Poland) Adam Skornicki 6.84
- (United States) Ricky Wells 5.83
- (Sweden) Jacob Thorssell 5.55
- (Sweden) Ludvig Lindgren 5.29

== See also ==
List of United Kingdom Speedway League Champions
