= 2015 Elite League speedway season =

British motorcycle speedway season

- League: Elite League
- Champions: Poole Pirates
- Elite Shield: Poole Pirates
- Riders' Championship: Jason Doyle
- Knockout Cup: not held
- Highest average: Jason Doyle
- Division/s below: 2015 Premier League; 2015 National League

The 2015 Elite League speedway season was the 81st season of the top division of UK speedway and the nineteenth season of the Elite League that took place between March and October 2015. The Poole Pirates were the defending champions after winning their second consecutive title in 2014.

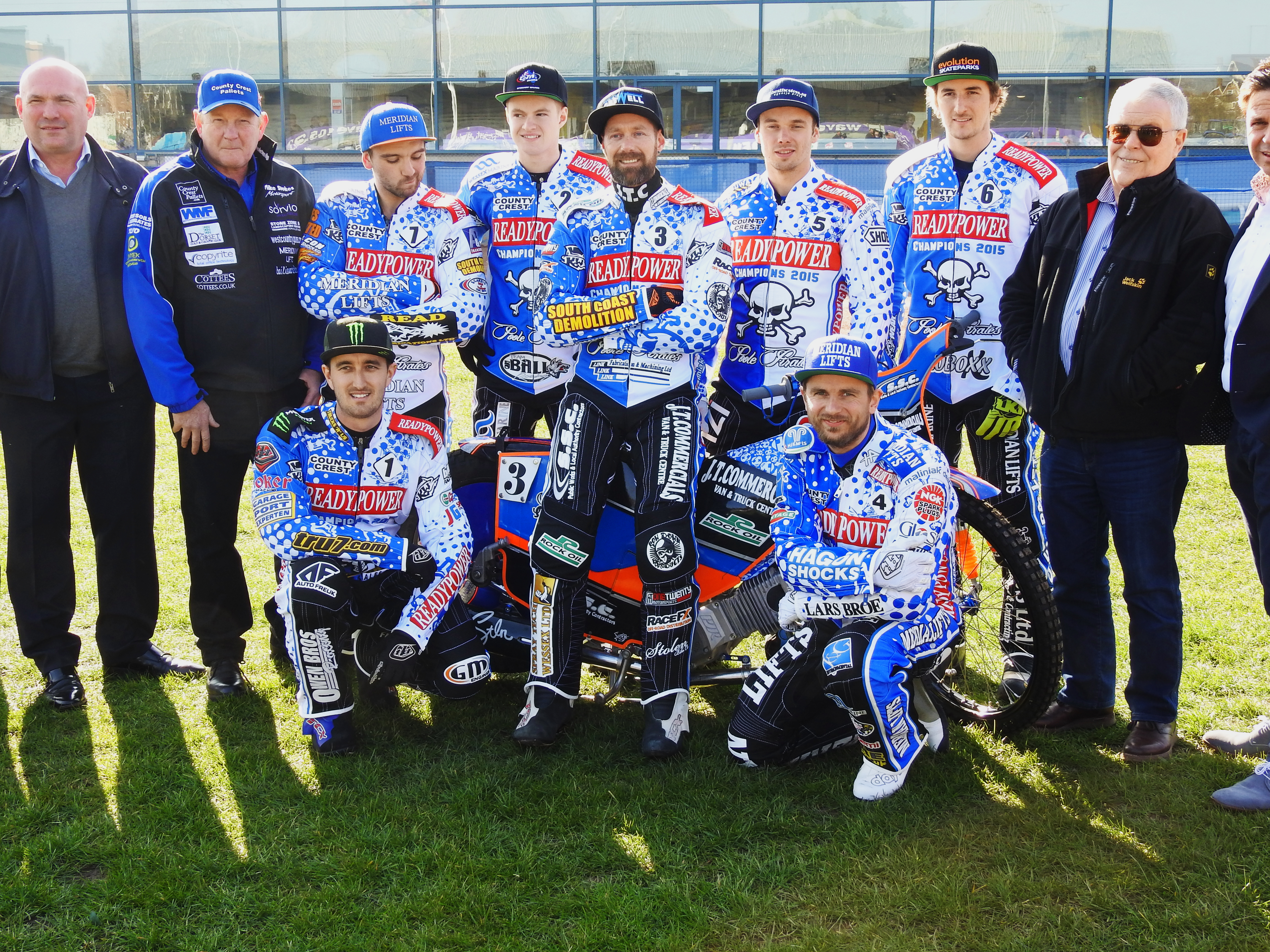
League champions Poole Pirates

== Summary ==
Both the Birmingham Brummies and the Eastbourne Eagles elected to ride in the National League in 2015, meaning the Elite League featured just 8 teams as opposed to the 10 teams that started the 2014 season.

The Poole Pirates won the Elite League for a record third successive year, beating the Belle Vue Aces in the two-legged Grand Final. The Aces – in their first Grand Final since 2005 – hosted the first leg at Kirkmanshulme Lane, and at one point trailed by 13 points. However, a tactical ride (offering double points) from Matej Žagar started their comeback, and despite trailing by 10 with 3 heats to go, the Aces managed to secure a 46–46 draw. At Poole Stadium, the Pirates repeated their fast start and the Aces could not gain the lead at any point during the meeting; in the penultimate heat, Kacper Gomólski sealed the title for Poole, the Pirates ultimately winning 92–90 on aggregate.

As well as winning the overall championship, the Pirates finished the regular season with the most points for the second season in succession, while the team also won the Elite Shield at the start of the season, defeating the King's Lynn Stars 96–85 on aggregate. The Elite League Riders' Championship was won by Australian rider Jason Doyle, a member of the Leicester Lions team.

== Regulation changes ==
At the annual Elite League AGM, which was held in November 2014, it was announced that the points limit for the top 5 members of the teams would be raised from 32 to 34. It was also decided that the fixture list for 2015 would be compiled in a matter which was described as "sympathetic" to riders competing in the Grand Prix series, with no fixtures to be ridden in the week prior to a Grand Prix. The effect of this was to potentially result in more of the top riders in World Speedway returning to race in the Elite League in the future. However, there was a visa issue for non-EU riders, meaning that many American and Australian riders were unable to race in the Elite League, unless the issue was resolved.

== Teams ==
Locations of the 2015 Elite League teams

=== Personnel and stadia ===
Team	Team Manager	Captain	Stadium
Belle Vue	(Australia) Mark Lemon	(England) Scott Nicholls	Kirkmanshulme Lane
Coventry	(England) Gary Havelock	(England) Chris Harris	Brandon Stadium
King's Lynn	(England) Rob Lyon	(Australia) Rory Schlein	Norfolk Arena
Lakeside	(England) Neil Vatcher	(Sweden) Andreas Jonsson	Arena Essex Raceway
Leicester	(Scotland) Norrie Allan	(Australia) Jason Doyle	Beaumont Park Stadium
Poole	(England) Neil Middleditch	(Poland) Maciej Janowski	Wimborne Road Stadium
Swindon	(England) Alun Rossiter	(Australia) Troy Batchelor	Abbey Stadium
Wolverhampton	(England) Peter Adams	(Sweden) Peter Karlsson	Monmore Green Stadium

== Results ==
Teams faced each other four times: twice home and away. The first of the home and away meetings were called the 'A' fixtures, and the second were the 'B' fixtures.

=== 'A' Fixtures ===
Home \ Away	BV	COV	KL	LH	LEI	PP	SWI	WOL
Belle Vue Aces		39–51	52–38	52–37	55–37	49–44	46–44	54–39
Coventry Bees	48–42		57–33	39–24	51–39	41–48	36–55	50–42
King's Lynn Stars	50–43	49–41		58–34	51–39	48–45	53–40	50–40
Lakeside Hammers	44–46	42–47	51–39		59–31	44–48	62–28	44–46
Leicester Lions	50–40	42–51	34–50	51–42		43–47	52–38	53–37
Poole Pirates	45–45	41–50	58–34	53–39	52–38		54–36	55–35
Swindon Robins	48–42	47–43	55–37	47–43	50–40	33–47		53–40
Wolverhampton Wolves	49–41	48–42	40–50	52–38	49–43	55–38	39–51	

Legend: Blue = home team win; Yellow = draw; Red = away team win.

=== 'B' Fixtures ===
Home \ Away	BV	COV	KL	LH	LEI	PP	SWI	WOL
Belle Vue Aces		45–45	55–35	52–41	53–37	53–39	48–42	57–33
Coventry Bees	47–43		48–42	52–38	54–36	54–36	47–43	60–32
King's Lynn Stars	49–41	48–42		63–29	44–46	47–46	51–39	56–37
Lakeside Hammers	51–42	45–45	50–39		57–35	40–50	43–50	57–34
Leicester Lions	52–40	42–48	44–46	39–51		38–52	49–42	48–42
Poole Pirates	53–40	53–37	62–30	60–30	64–29		45–45	60–33
Swindon Robins	39–53	49–31	53–39	50–39	51–39	50–42		60–32
Wolverhampton Wolves	36–57	40–50	49–41	60–33	44–46	47–46	38–52	

Legend: Blue = home team win; Yellow = draw; Red = away team win.

== Final league table ==
Pos.	Club	M	Home			Away					F	A	+/−	Pts
Pos.	Club	M	W	D	L	4W	3W	D	1L	L	F	A	+/−	Pts
1	Poole Pirates (Q)	28	11	2	1	5	2	0	4	3	1383	1131	+252	65
2	Coventry Bees (Q)	28	11	0	3	4	2	2	2	4	1278	1189	+89	61
3	Swindon Robins (Q)	28	12	0	2	4	0	1	3	6	1290	1240	+50	57
4	Belle Vue Aces (Q)	28	12	1	1	2	1	1	3	7	1325	1223	+102	53
5	King's Lynn Stars	28	13	0	1	2	1	0	1	10	1276	1263	+13	51
6	Leicester Lions	28	7	0	7	0	2	0	1	11	1172	1360	−188	28
7	Wolverhampton Wolves	28	8	0	6	0	1	0	1	12	1168	1385	−217	28
8	Lakeside Hammers	28	7	1	6	1	0	0	1	12	1207	1308	−101	27

== Play-offs ==
=== Draw ===
Semi-finals
4	Belle Vue Aces	50	47	97
3	Swindon Robins	36	43	79
2	Coventry Bees	45	31	76
1	Poole Pirates	45	58	103

Grand final
4	Belle Vue Aces	46	44	90
1	Poole Pirates	46	46	92

=== Semi-finals ===
14 September 2015	Report	Belle Vue Aces	50–36	Swindon Robins	Kirkmanshulme Lane; Referee(s): Peter Clarke

18 September 2015	Report	Coventry Bees	45–45	Poole Pirates	Brandon Stadium; Referee(s): Chris Durno

21 September 2015	Report	Swindon Robins	43–47	Belle Vue Aces	Abbey Stadium; Referee(s): Mick Posselwhite

21 September 2015	Report	Poole Pirates	58–31	Coventry Bees	Poole Stadium; Referee(s): Jim Lawrence

=== Grand Final ===
28 September 2015	Report	Belle Vue Aces; Žagar 14; Cook 12; Nicholls 8 Grajczonek 5 Fricke 4 Worrall 2 Nielsen 1	46–46	Poole Pirates; Holder 10; Starke 9 Newman 9 North 7 Watt 5 Janowski 4 Gomolski 2	Kirkmanshulme Lane; Referee(s): Graham Flint

30 September 2015	Report	Poole Pirates; Janowski 11; Newman 7 Watt 7 Gomolski 7 North 6 Holder 4 Starke 4	46–44	Belle Vue Aces; Cook 13; Nicholls 10; Žagar 5 Grajczonek 5 Fricke 4 Nielsen 4 Worrall 3	Poole Stadium; Referee(s): Mick Bates

== Riders' Championship ==
Jason Doyle won the Riders' Championship. The final was held at Beaumont Park Stadium on 1 March.

Pos.	Rider	Pts	Total	SF	Final
1	(Australia) Jason Doyle	2 3 3 2 2	12	3	3
2	(Denmark) Niels Kristian Iversen	3 3 2 1 3	12	x	2
3	(Poland) Maciej Janowski	1 3 3 3 3	13	x	1
4	(Australia) Troy Batchelor	1 3 2 0 3	9	2	0
5	(England) Scott Nicholls	1 1 3 3 2	10	1	
6	(Denmark) Hans Andersen	3 1 3 0 3	10	0	
7	(Poland) Szymon Woźniak	2 2 1 3 0	9		
8	(Sweden) Freddie Lindgren	3 2 2 0 1	8		
9	(Australia) Chris Holder	2 2 2 1 1	8		
10	(Slovenia) Matej Žagar	3 1 ret 1 2	7		
11	(Denmark) Bjarne Pedersen	1 2 ret 2 1	6		
12	(Denmark) Kenneth Bjerre	2 1 1 2 ret	6		
13	(Australia) Nick Morris	exc 0 1 3 1	5		
14	(England) Richard Lawson	0 0 0 2 2	4		
15	(Denmark) Mikkel Bech	0 0 0 1 ret	1		
16	(England) Chris Harris	0 ret	0		
17	(England) Josh Auty (res)	0 f/exc	0		
18	(England) Josh Bates (res)	ret 0	0		

- f=fell, exc=excluded, ret=retired ef=engine failure t-touched tapes

== Final leading averages ==
Rider	Team	Average
(Australia) Jason Doyle	Leicester	9.39
(Poland) Maciej Janowski	Poole	9.38
(Denmark) Niels Kristian Iversen	Kings Lynn	9.09
(England) Kyle Newman	Poole	8.41
(Sweden) Andreas Jonsson	Lakeside	8.40
(England) Chris Harris	Coventry	8.34
(Australia) Rory Schlein	King's Lynn	8.15
(England) Jason Garrity	Coventry	8.09
(Slovenia) Matej Žagar	Belle Vue	8.03
(England) Scott Nicholls	Belle Vue	7.92

== Riders & final averages ==
Unless otherwise stated, all listed riders were declared at the start of the 2015 Elite League season.

Belle Vue

- (Slovenia) Matej Žagar 8.03
- (England) Scott Nicholls 7.92
- (England) Craig Cook 7.86
- (England) Steve Worrall 6.98
- (Australia) Josh Grajczonek 6.64 (Note: Josh Grajczonek replaced Simon Stead for the seventh declaration of the season.)
- (Australia) Max Fricke 6.52
- (England) Stefan Nielsen 4.93
- (England) Simon Stead 4.53

Coventry

- (England) Chris Harris 8.34
- (England) Jason Garrity 8.09
- (Finland) Joonas Kylmäkorpi 7.45
- (Denmark) Hans N. Andersen 7.29
- (England) Danny King 6.84
- (England) Stuart Robson 5.64 (Note: Kyle Howarth replaced Stuart Robson for the twenty-second declaration of the season.)
- (England) James Sarjeant 5.23
- (England) Kyle Howarth 4.36

King's Lynn

- (Denmark) Niels Kristian Iversen 9.09
- (Australia) Rory Schlein 8.15 (Note: Václav Milík, Jr. replaced Rory Schlein for the thirteenth declaration of the season.)
- (England) Robert Lambert 7.65
- (England) Lewis Kerr 7.15
- (Denmark) Kenneth Bjerre 6.24
- (Denmark) Nicklas Porsing 5.23
- (Czech Republic) Václav Milík, Jr. 5.14
- (England) Ashley Morris 4.21

Lakeside

- (Sweden) Andreas Jonsson 8.40
- (Sweden) Kim Nilsson 7.24
- (Denmark) Mikkel Bech 7.16
- (England) Ashley Birks 7.13 (Note: Steve Boxall replaced Ashley Birks for the third declaration of the season. This change was reverted for the fourth declaration. Boxall again replaced Birks for the seventh declaration, with Birks returning for the thirteenth declaration.)
- (England) Edward Kennett 6.63
- (England) Richard Lawson 6.63
- (England) Adam Ellis 4.89

Leicester

- (Australia) Jason Doyle 9.39
- (England) Josh Auty 7.29
- (Australia) Sam Masters 6.50 (Note: Sam Masters replaced Bjarne Pedersen for the eleventh declaration of the season.)
- (Poland) Grzegorz Walasek 6.49
- (Poland) Szymon Woźniak 5.97
- (Denmark) Bjarne Pedersen 4.20
- (Poland) Piotr Świderski 4.47 (Note: Piotr Świderski replaced Lewis Bridger for the fifteenth declaration of the season.)
- (England) Simon Lambert 3.69

Poole

- (Poland) Maciej Janowski 9.38
- (England) Kyle Newman 8.41
- (Australia) Chris Holder 7.86
- (Australia) Davey Watt 7.57 (Note: Josh Grajczonek replaced Davey Watt for the second declaration of the season. Watt returned for the sixth declaration.)
- (Australia) Josh Grajczonek 7.25
- (Poland) Kacper Gomólski 6.72
- (Australia) Dakota North 6.70
- (England) Paul Starke 5.34

Swindon

- (Australia) Darcy Ward 10.40 (10 matches only) (Note: Darcy Ward replaced Adrian Miedziński for the seventeenth declaration of the season.) (Note: Peter Kildemand replaced Ward for the twenty-second declaration of the season.)
- (Poland) Adrian Miedziński 8.21 (2 matches only) (Note: Peter Kildemand replaced Adrian Miedziński for the sixth declaration of the season. Miedziński returned for the twelfth declaration, but this change was reverted for the thirteenth declaration. Miedziński again returned for the fifteenth declaration.)
- (Denmark) Peter Kildemand 7.88
- (Poland) Grzegorz Zengota 7.70
- (Australia) Troy Batchelor 7.55
- (Australia) Nick Morris 7.42
- (Australia) Aaron Summers 7.24 (Note: Aaron Summers replaced Eduard Krčmář for the twentieth declaration of the season.)
- (England) Charles Wright 6.63
- (England) Kyle Howarth 6.38 (Note: Eduard Krčmář replaced Kyle Howarth for the seventeenth declaration of the season.)
- (England) Lewis Rose 3.73
- (Czech Republic) Eduard Krčmář 2.50

Wolverhampton

- (Sweden) Peter Karlsson 7.16
- (Sweden) Fredrik Lindgren 7.13
- (United States) Ricky Wells 6.58
- (England) Lewis Blackbird 6.37
- (Sweden) Jacob Thorssell 5.97
- (Poland) Tobiasz Musielak 5.11
- (England) Josh Bates 4.34

== See also ==
List of United Kingdom Speedway League Champions
