= 2016 Elite League speedway season =

British motorcycle speedway season

- League: 2016 Elite League
- Champions: Wolverhampton Wolves
- Elite Shield: Poole Pirates
- Riders' Championship: Freddie Lindgren
- Knockout Cup: not held
- Highest average: Jason Doyle
- Division/s below: 2016 Premier League; 2016 National League

The 2016 Elite League was the 82nd season of the top division of speedway leagues in Great Britain. The Elite League ran between March and October 2016. The Poole Pirates were the defending champions after winning their third consecutive title in 2015. The lineup of teams for 2016 stayed the same as in 2015, with the same eight teams competing. It was the last time that the competition would be known as the Elite League.

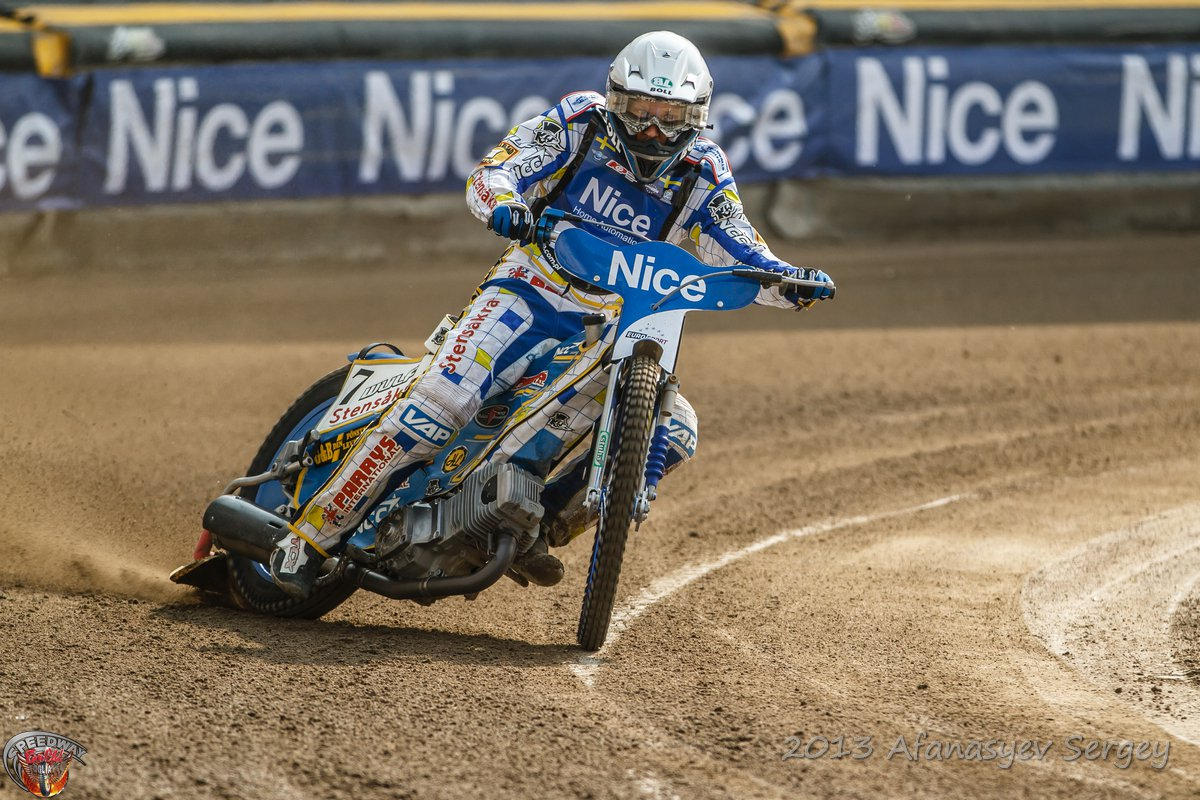
Freddie Lindgren

== Regulation changes ==
At the annual Elite League AGM, which was held during October and November 2015, it was announced that speedway bosses would continue to give more opportunities to young talent. All 8 Elite League teams would continue to track two young British draft riders, who would start the season at reserve. However unlike recent years these riders would be given Elite League averages after four meetings, giving them the chance to move into the top five of the team if they performed well. As a result of the reserve riders being given averages the overall points limit that teams must adhere to was raised from 34 to 40.5. In February 2016, it was announced that Elite League teams could sign an eighth stand-in rider, who could race in positions 2 to 5. The rider must be foreign and new to the Elite League. Lakeside Hammers signed Dennis Jonsson as their eight rider for the season.

== Teams ==
Locations of the 2015 Elite League teams

== Results ==
Teams faced each other four times: twice home and away. The first of the home and away meetings were called the 'A' fixtures, and the second were the 'B' fixtures.

=== 'A' Fixtures ===
Home \ Away	BV	COV	KL	LH	LEI	PP	SWI	WOL
Belle Vue Aces		50–42	45–21	50–40	48–42	49–41	40–50	56–37
Coventry Bees	46–43		46–47	54–30	49–41	47–46	42–50	38–52
King's Lynn Stars	39–54	46–44		51–39	51–42	38–55	45–45	48–42
Lakeside Hammers	53–39	60–33	56–36		56–34	50–40	51–39	53–37
Leicester Lions	41–52	46–44	45–45	33–56		46–46	50–42	39–51
Poole Pirates	41–49	60–29	65–25	57–33	58–35		61–31	51–39
Swindon Robins	51–40	55–35	55–38	50–40	43–47	44–46		44–48
Wolverhampton Wolves	46–43	51–41	49–44	54–38	58–31	55–35	62–30	

Legend: Blue = home team win; Yellow = draw; Red = away team win.

=== 'B' Fixtures ===
Home \ Away	BV	COV	KL	LH	LEI	PP	SWI	WOL
Belle Vue Aces		59–34	41–49	63–29	52–40	48–45	52–40	46–44
Coventry Bees	42–48		41–48	57–33	50–40	47–43	56–34	46–44
King's Lynn Stars	50–40	41–49		48–42	54–38	39–53	41–51	40–52
Lakeside Hammers	48–45	57–35	60–32		66–26	42–48	58–35	55–37
Leicester Lions	43–47	52–41	n/a	44–46		52–38	44–46	47–43
Poole Pirates	52–41	56–36	61–29	52–41	58–32		50–40	52–38
Swindon Robins	33–39	55–36	52–38	52–41	57–33	50–42		50–41
Wolverhampton Wolves	39–51	52–41	61–29	51–41	50–40	48–42	51–39	

Legend: Blue = home team win; Yellow = draw; Red = away team win.

== Final league table ==
Leicester Vs King's Lynn (B Fixture) was not raced

Pos.	Club	M	Home			Away					F	A	+/−	Pts
Pos.	Club	M	W	D	L	4W	3W	D	1L	L	F	A	+/−	Pts
1	Belle Vue Aces Q	28	12	0	2	4	3	0	3	4	1330	1178	+152	64
2	Poole Pirates Q	28	13	0	1	2	2	1	4	5	1394	1153	+241	59
3	Wolverhampton Wolves Q	28	13	0	1	3	1	0	4	6	1332	1210	+122	58
4	Lakeside Hammers Q	28	13	0	1	1	1	0	1	11	1323	1232	+91	47
5	Swindon Robins	28	10	0	4	3	1	1	0	9	1263	1267	-4	47
6	King's Lynn Stars	27	7	1	6	2	1	1	1	8	1112	1323	-211	36
7	Coventry Bees	28	9	0	5	1	0	0	2	11	1201	1348	-147	33
8	Leicester Lions	27	5	2	6	0	1	0	1	12	1103	1347	-244	21

== Elite League play-offs ==
=== Draw ===
Semi-finals
4	Lakeside Hammers	41	28	69
1	Belle Vue Aces	49	63	112
2	Poole Pirates	51	35	86
3	Wolverhampton Wolves	39	55	94

Grand final
1	Belle Vue Aces	36	50	86
3	Wolverhampton Wolves	54	42	96

=== Semi-finals ===
21 September 2016	Report	Lakeside Hammers	41–49	Belle Vue Aces	Arena Essex Raceway; Referee(s): Mick Bates

21 September 2016	Report	Poole Pirates	51–39	Wolverhampton Wolves	Poole Stadium; Referee(s): Chris Gay

28 September 2016	Report	Belle Vue Aces	63–28	Lakeside Hammers	National Speedway Stadium; Referee(s): Craig Ackroyd

28 September 2016	Report	Wolverhampton Wolves	55–35	Poole Pirates	Monmore Green Stadium; Referee(s): Phil Griffin

=== Grand final ===
3 October 2016	Report	Wolverhampton Wolves; Kyle Howarth 12; Freddie Lindgren 9 Jacob Thorssell 9 Tai Woffinden 8 Sam Masters 8 Max Clegg 4 Peter Karlsson 4	54–36	Belle Vue Aces; Craig Cook 10; Steve Worrall 8 Scott Nicholls 6 Richie Worrall 6 Matej Žagar 5 Max Fricke 1 Joe Jacobs 0	Monmore Green Stadium; Referee(s): Chris Durno

5 October 2016	Report	Belle Vue Aces; Matej Žagar 10; Max Fricke 9 Joe Jacobs 9 Craig Cook 8 Richie Worrall 7 Steve Worrall 4 Scott Nicholls 3	50–42	Wolverhampton Wolves; Freddie Lindgren 14; Tai Woffinden 11; Peter Karlsson 8 Sam Masters 3 Kyle Howarth 3 Jacob Thorssell 2 Max Clegg 1	National Speedway Stadium; Referee(s): Willie Dishington

== Riders' Championship ==
Freddie Lindgren won the Riders' Championship for the second time. The final was held at Brandon Stadium on 8 October.

Pos.	Rider	Pts	Total	SF	Final
1	(Sweden) Freddie Lindgren	3 2 1 3 3	12	x	3
2	(Denmark) Niels Kristian Iversen	2 3 3 3 0	11	3	2
3	(England) Chris Harris	1 0 2 3 3	9	2	1
4	(England) Edward Kennett	3 3 3 2 3	14	x	0
5	(Sweden) Kim Nilsson	1 3 3 2 1	10	1	
6	(England) Danny King	2 3 0 2 1	8	0	
7	(England) Kyle Newman	2 2 1 1 2	8		
8	(England) Robert Lambert	1 1 2 3 1	8		
9	(England) Paul Starke	2 F/exc 2 1 2	7		
10	(Australia) Nick Morris	0 1 3 F/exc 2	6		
11	(Denmark) Patrick Hougaard	0 1 F/exc 2 3	6		
12	(England) Adam Ellis	3 2 FX 0 0	5		
13	(England) Scott Nicholls	1 2 0 0 2	5		
14	(Australia) Sam Masters	3 1 1 0 0	5		
15	(Australia) Rohan Tungate	EF 0 2 1 1	4		
16	(England) Tom Bacon (res)	0 0 1 1 0	2		
17	(England) Joe Jacobs	- - - -	0		
18	(England) Conor Dwyer (res)	0	0		

- f=fell, exc=excluded, ret=retired ef=engine failure t-touched tapes

== Final Leading averages ==
Rider	Team	Average
(Australia) Jason Doyle	Swindon	9.58
(Denmark) Niels Kristian Iversen	Kings Lynn	9.04
(Australia) Chris Holder	Poole	8.95
(Sweden) Andreas Jonsson	Lakeside	8.45
(Poland) Krzysztof Kasprzak	Coventry	7.91
(Slovenia) Matej Žagar	Belle Vue	7.48
(England) Craig Cook	Belle Vue	7.37
(England) Danny King	Coventry	7.22
(Sweden) Freddie Lindgren	Wolverhampton	7.21
(Australia) Sam Masters	Wolverhampton	7.18

== Riders and final averages ==
Belle Vue Aces

- (Slovenia) Matej Žagar 7.48
- (England) Craig Cook 7.37
- (Australia) Max Fricke 7.08
- (England) Scott Nicholls 6.59
- (England) Steve Worrall 5.95
- (England) Richie Worrall 5.82
- (England) Joe Jacobs 5.14

Coventry Bees

- (Poland) Krzysztof Kasprzak 7.91
- (England) Chris Harris 6.58
- (England) Danny King 7.22
- (England) Jason Garrity 6.00
- (England) Adam Roynon 4.80
- (England) Josh Bates 4.76
- (Poland) Kacper Woryna 4.65
- (England) Ben Barker 4.54
- (England) James Sarjeant 3.81

King's Lynn Stars

- (Denmark) Niels Kristian Iversen 9.04
- (England) Robert Lambert 7.08
- (Denmark) Mads Korneliussen 6.04
- (England) Simon Lambert 5.47
- (Australia) Troy Batchelor 5.26
- (Australia) Rory Schlein 5.12
- (England) Lewis Rose 5.00
- (Denmark) Nicklas Porsing 4.99
- (Denmark) Nikolaj Busk Jakobsen 4.15
- (Germany) Kai Huckenbeck 3.67
- (England) Carl Wilkinson 3.47

Rory Schlein replaced Mads Korneliussen on 7 July in the King's Lynn Stars team.
Nicklas Porsing replaced Rory Schlein on 1 September in the King's Lynn Stars team.

Lakeside Hammers

- (Sweden) Andreas Jonsson 8.45
- (England) Edward Kennett 7.16
- (Sweden) Kim Nilsson 6.88
- (England) Lewis Bridger 6.09
- (England) Ben Morley 6.00
- (England) Richard Lawson 5.83
- (Poland) Piotr Świderski 5.20
- (England) Lewis Kerr 4.80
- (England) Robert Mear 3.65

Leicester Lions

- (Denmark) Nicolai Klindt 6.36
- (Denmark) Patrick Hougaard 6.22
- (Poland) Szymon Wozniak 5.91
- (Sweden) Ludvig Lindgren 5.67
- (Poland) Grzegorz Walasek 5.45
- (Australia) Davey Watt 5.40
- (England) Paul Starke 4.94
- (England) Josh Auty 4.90
- (Australia) Aaron Summers 4.69
- (Poland) Sebastian Ułamek 3.52

Aaron Summers replaced Grzegorz Walasek on 12 April in the Leicester Lions team.
Davey Watt replaced Sebastian Ułamek on 11 May in the Leicester Lions team.
Ludvig Lindgren replaced Davey Watt on 13 June in the Leicester Lions team.

Poole Pirates

- (Australia) Chris Holder 8.95
- (Denmark) Hans N. Andersen 7.15
- (Denmark) Bjarne Pedersen 6.91
- (Australia) Davey Watt 6.80
- (Poland) Krzysztof Buczkowski 6.02
- (Australia) Brady Kurtz 6.44
- (England) Adam Ellis 5.60
- (England) Kyle Newman 5.52

Bjarne Pedersen replaced Davey Watt on 26 April in the Poole Pirates team.
Antonio Lindbäck replaced Hans Andersen on 19 September in the Poole Pirates team.

Swindon Robins

- (Australia) Jason Doyle 9.58
- (Australia) Nick Morris 6.41
- (Australia) Rohan Tungate 6.05
- (Australia) Josh Grajczonek 5.95
- (Australia) Justin Sedgmen 5.43
- (England) Charles Wright 4.84
- (England) Stefan Nielsen 3.67

Wolverhampton Wolves

- (England) Tai Woffinden 8.41
- (Sweden) Fredrik Lindgren 7.21
- (Australia) Sam Masters 7.18
- (Sweden) Jacob Thorssell 7.06
- (Finland) Joonas Kylmäkorpi 6.68
- (Denmark) Mikkel Bech 6.26
- (Sweden) Peter Karlsson 5.91
- (England) Kyle Howarth 5.13
- (England) Max Clegg 4.15
- (England) Ashley Morris 2.81

Peter Karlsson replaced Mikkel Bech on 3 June in the Wolverhampton Wolves team.
Tai Woffinden replaced Joonas Kylmäkorpi on 11 August in the Wolverhampton Wolves team.

== See also ==
List of United Kingdom Speedway League Champions
