= Elite League Riders' Championship =

- Formerly: Premier League Riders Championship (1995-1996 only)
- Sport: Speedway
- Founded: 1997
- Folded: 2016
- Country: United Kingdom

Notes
- replaced by SGB Premiership Riders' Individual Championship

The Elite League Riders' Championship is a motorcycle speedway contest between the top riders (or two riders) with the highest average points total from each club competing in the Elite League in the UK.

== History ==
The competition replaced the Premier League Riders Championship in 1997. It was in turn replaced by the SGB Premiership Riders' Individual Championship in 2017.

== Winners ==
Year	Venue	Winner	Team
1997	Odsal Stadium, Bradford	(United States) Greg Hancock	Coventry Bees
1998	Abbey Stadium, Swindon	(Sweden) Tony Rickardsson	Ipswich Witches
1999	Brandon Stadium, Coventry	(Australia) Jason Crump	Peterborough Panthers
2000	Brandon Stadium, Coventry	(Australia) Ryan Sullivan	Peterborough Panthers
2001	Owlerton Stadium, Sheffield	(Australia) Jason Crump	King's Lynn Knights
2002	Wimborne Road, Poole	(Sweden) Tony Rickardsson	Poole Pirates
2003	Brandon Stadium, Coventry	(England) Lee Richardson	Coventry Bees
2004	Wimborne Road, Poole	(Denmark) Bjarne Pedersen	Poole Pirates
2005	Abbey Stadium, Swindon	(Denmark) Nicki Pedersen	Eastbourne Eagles
2006	Wimborne Road, Poole	(Australia) Jason Crump	Belle Vue Aces
2007	Norfolk Arena, King's Lynn	(Denmark) Nicki Pedersen	Eastbourne Eagles
2008	Perry Barr Stadium, Birmingham	(Australia) Jason Crump	Belle Vue Aces
2009	Brandon Stadium, Coventry	(Australia) Leigh Adams	Swindon Robins
2010	East of England Arena, Peterborough	(Sweden) Fredrik Lindgren	Wolverhampton Wolves
2011	Abbey Stadium, Swindon	(Australia) Rory Schlein	Belle Vue Aces
2012	Abbey Stadium, Swindon	(Australia) Chris Holder	Poole Pirates
2013	Abbey Stadium, Swindon	(Australia) Rory Schlein	King's Lynn Stars
2014	Norfolk Arena, King's Lynn	(Australia) Troy Batchelor	Swindon Robins
2015	Beaumont Park Stadium, Leicester	(Australia) Jason Doyle	Leicester Lions
2016	Brandon Stadium, Coventry	(Sweden) Fredrik Lindgren	Wolverhampton Wolves

== See also ==
- List of United Kingdom Speedway League Riders' champions
- Speedway in the United Kingdom
