= SGB Premiership Pairs =

- Formerly: British League Pairs (1976-1987); Elite League Pairs (2004-2011)
- Sport: motorcycle speedway
- Founded: 2004
- Country: United Kingdom

The SGB Premiership Pairs (formerly the Elite League Pairs) is a motorcycle speedway contest between the top two riders from each club competing in the SGB Premiership in the United Kingdom.

== History ==
The Championship was a reincarnation of the British League Pairs Championship, which ran from 1976 until 1987. After the eighth running of the competition in 2011 the Championship was discontinued. However the pairs returned for the top tier once again in 2017 and was called the SGB Premiership Pairs Championship and won by the King's Lynn Stars riders Chris Holder & Robert Lambert. From 2004 until 2011 it was known as the Elite League Pairs because the top league in the UK was called the Elite League at the time.

== Rules ==
In the Qualification Heats, riders are allocated starting gates. For the Semi-Finals, the group winners have first choice of gate positions (A&C or B&D). Gate A is on the inside of the track, whilst Gate D is on the outside. For the Final, the gate positions (A&C and B&D) are decided by the toss of a coin. A pair finishing third and second will score five points, whereas a pair finishing first and last will score only four. Race points scored over all Qualification Heats are used to determine the final group placings.

== Winners ==
Year	Winners	2nd place
Elite League Pairs
2004	Swindon Robins (Leigh Adams & Charlie Gjedde)	Belle Vue Aces (Jason Crump & Joe Screen)
2005	Swindon Robins (Leigh Adams & Lee Richardson)	Belle Vue Aces (Jason Crump & Joe Screen)
2006	Belle Vue Aces (Jason Crump & Simon Stead)	Swindon Robins (Leigh Adams & Sebastian Ułamek)
2007	Poole Pirates (Jason Crump & Bjarne Pedersen)	Reading Bulldogs (Greg Hancock & Travis McGowan)
2008	Coventry Bees (Hans Andersen & Chris Harris)	Swindon Robins (Leigh Adams & Mads Korneliussen)
2009	Poole Pirates (Hans Andersen & Chris Holder)	Eastbourne Eagles (Lewis Bridger & Davey Watt)
2010	Coventry Bees (Chris Harris & Krzysztof Kasprzak)	Poole Pirates (Chris Holder & Bjarne Pedersen)
2011	Poole Pirates (Chris Holder & Darcy Ward)	Belle Vue Aces (Chris Harris & Rory Schlein)
Not held between 2012 and 2016
SGB Premiership Pairs
2017	King's Lynn Stars (Chris Holder & Robert Lambert)	Wolverhampton Wolves (Jacob Thorssell & Freddie Lindgren)
Not held between 2018 and 2021
2022	Ipswich Witches (5 rounds)	Belle Vue Aces (5 rounds)
2023	Belle Vue Aces (Dan Bewley, Brady Kurtz & Jake Mulford)	Peterborough Panthers (Richie Worrall, Ben Cook & Jordan Jenkins)

== See also ==
- List of United Kingdom Speedway Pairs champions
- British League Pairs Championship
