= Dennis Jonsson (speedway rider) =

Swedish speedway rider

- Born: 30 November 1991 (age 34); Stockholm, Sweden
- Nationality: Swedish

Career history

Sweden
- 2015–2016: Valsarna
- 2016: Masarna

Great Britain
- 2016: Lakeside

Dennis Jonsson (born 30 November 1991) is a former speedway rider from Sweden.

== Speedway career ==
Jonsson rode in the top tier of British Speedway riding for the Lakeside Hammers in the 2016 Elite League. He retired from speedway following a serious accident when riding for Marsana in Sweden.

== Family ==
Jonsson is the son of Per Jonsson, the 1990 World Champion.
