= 2014 Elite League speedway season =

British motorcycle speedway season

- League: Elite League
- Champions: Poole Pirates
- Elite Shield: Poole Pirates
- Riders Championship: Troy Batchelor
- Knockout Cup: not held
- Highest average: Niels Kristian Iversen
- Division/s below: 2014 Premier League; 2014 National League

The 2014 Elite League speedway season was the 80th season of the top division of UK speedway and the took place between March and October 2014. The Poole Pirates were the defending champions after winning in 2013.

== Teams ==
Locations of the 2014 Elite League teams

== Summary ==
This season saw the first team line-up change since 2011, with the Leicester Lions replacing the Peterborough Panthers who dropped down a division. Ahead of the season the BSPA announced a new rule called the "Fast Track Scheme" which means every side has to use two British youngsters at reserve who have passed through the National League - the third tier of British speedway.

Poole Pirates won their second consecutive Elite League title, defeating Coventry Bees 90–71 in the Grand Final. Poole continued their success, their sixth league title in eleven years. Darcy Ward, Maciej Janowski, Przemysław Pawlicki and Josh Grajczonek all returned for Poole and they were backed up by Kyle Newman and Václav Milík Jr.

== Final league table ==
Pos.	Club	M	Home				Away					F	A	+/−	Pts
Pos.	Club	M	3W	2W	D	L	4W	3W	D	1L	L	F	A	+/−	Pts
1	Poole Pirates (Q)	32	12	2	0	2	4	1	4	3	4	1542	1333	+209	70
2	King's Lynn Stars (Q)	32	11	4	0	1	3	4	0	5	4	1528	1346	+182	70
3	Coventry Bees (Q)	32	10	3	0	3	5	2	0	2	7	1489	1406	+83	64
4	Swindon Robins (Q)	32	10	3	0	3	3	1	0	4	8	1465	1407	+58	55
5	Eastbourne Eagles	32	12	3	1	0	0	0	0	4	12	1430	1460	−30	47
6	Lakeside Hammers	32	10	3	1	2	0	1	1	3	11	1435	1445	−10	45
7	Wolverhampton Wolves	32	6	4	2	4	0	2	0	3	11	1398	1524	−126	37
8	Belle Vue Aces	32	8	3	1	4	0	0	1	1	14	1372	1524	−152	34
9	Leicester Lions	32	5	3	1	7	0	0	0	3	13	1350	1564	−214	25
	Birmingham Brummies	Club folded, results expunged													

=== 'A' Fixtures ===
Home \ Away	BV	BIR	COV	EAS	KL	LH	LEI	PP	SWI	WOL
Belle Vue Aces		51–39	36–56	52–40	39–54	45–45	56–35	51–39	41–49	50–39
Birmingham Brummies	50–40		46–44	52–44	30–60	37–56	n/a	n/a	n/a	46–44
Coventry Bees	52–40	46–44		60–32	42–48	49–41	48–42	47–43	41–49	48–42
Eastbourne Eagles	50–43	62–30	61–30		49–40	48–42	52–37	45–45	54–37	59–31
King's Lynn Stars	52–38	60–32	53–43	60–32		52–43	48–42	47–43	48–42	49–41
Lakeside Hammers	58–32	69–21	54–35	55–41	45–47		52–42	35–26	47–44	53–30
Leicester Lions	50–43	n/a	40–50	49–41	42–47	48–41		45–45	45–47	44–46
Poole Pirates	53–40	48–42	49–41	52–37	44–46	50–40	59–34		56–34	49–41
Swindon Robins	57–36	n/a	26–36	46–44	50–40	55–37	48–40	45–47		46–47
Wolverhampton Wolves	45–45	58–35	47–43	61–32	47–42	48–42	56–37	45–45	52–38	

Legend: Blue = home team win; Yellow = draw; Red = away team win.

=== 'B' Fixtures ===
Home \ Away	BV	BIR	COV	EAS	KL	LH	LEI	PP	SWI	WOL
Belle Vue Aces		56–39	40–53	47–43	48–42	42–33	55–38	54–38	48–44	55–38
Birmingham Brummies	n/a		n/a	n/a	42–48	n/a	n/a	n/a	n/a	n/a
Coventry Bees	52–39	n/a		60–33	52–38	55–35	50–42	40–50	53–40	58–34
Eastbourne Eagles	57–35	n/a	49–44		49–44	50–40	55–36	50–40	53–40	55–35
King's Lynn Stars	50–40	n/a	61–31	39–24		59–35	51–39	41–49	44–43	54–39
Lakeside Hammers	59–31	n/a	39–56	47–43	47–43		59–36	45–45	56–38	57–35
Leicester Lions	56–36	n/a	54–38	45–44	39–51	48–42		41–49	37–52	47–45
Poole Pirates	57–37	60–32	47–48	56–35	48–42	53–37	59–31		56–35	48–42
Swindon Robins	42–33	n/a	60–31	56–36	52–41	57–35	47–43	46–43		59–36
Wolverhampton Wolves	48–45	n/a	44–46	56–37	37–53	44–46	50–42	36–59	51–41	

Legend: Blue = home team win; Yellow = draw; Red = away team win.

== Play-offs ==
=== Draw ===
Semi-finals
3	Coventry Bees	49	50	99
4	Swindon Robins	41	45	86
1	Poole Pirates	45	47	92
2	King's Lynn Stars	44	43	87

Grand final
3	Coventry Bees	34	37	71
1	Poole Pirates	37	53	90

=== Semi-finals ===
29 September 2014	Report	Coventry Bees	49–41	Swindon Robins	Brandon Stadium; Referee(s): Chris Durno

29 September 2014	Report	King's Lynn Stars	44–45	Poole Pirates	King's Lynn Stadium; Referee(s): Graham Flint

6 October 2014	Report	Swindon Robins	45–50	Coventry Bees	Swindon; Referee(s): Dan Holt

16 October 2014 (Note: Postponed from 6 October 2014 due to a waterlogged track.)	Report	Poole Pirates	47–43	King's Lynn Stars	Poole Stadium; Referee(s): Christina Turnbull

=== Grand final ===
17 October 2014 (Note: Result stood after 12 heats, due to rain.)	Report	Coventry Bees; Howarth 10; Harris 8 Garrity 5 Hansen 5 Andersen 3 Sarjeant 2 Barker 1	34–37	Poole Pirates; Newman 9 Pawlicki 8 Janowski 6 Batchelor 5 Milik 5 King 4 Williamson 0	Brandon Stadium; Referee(s): Peter Clarke

20 October 2014	Report	Poole Pirates; Janowski 14; Newman 11; Pawlicki 8 Milik 8 Batchelor 6 Morris 5 Compton 1	53–37	Coventry Bees; Howarth 9 Harris 7 Garrity 6 Andersen 6 Sarjeant 4 Fricke 3 Hansen 2	Poole Stadium; Referee(s): Mick Bates

== Knockout Cup ==
The Knockout Cup was not held during 2014.

== Riders' Championship ==
Troy Batchelor won the Riders' Championship. The final was held at King's Lynn Stadium on 25 September.

Pos.	Rider	Pts	Total	SF	Final
1	(Australia) Troy Batchelor	2 3 3 1 3	12	3	3
2	(Poland) Maciej Janowski	1 3 2 2 2	10	2	2
3	(Australia) Jason Doyle	3 1 3 3 2	12	x	1
4	(Slovenia) Matej Žagar	3 T/exc 3 3 3	12	x	0
5	(Denmark) Bjarne Pedersen	2 3 3 2 1	11	1	
6	(Denmark) Hans Andersen	3 2 2 2 0	9	0	
7	(England) Chris Harris	2 2 1 1 3	9		
8	(Denmark) Václav Milík Jr.	0 2 2 3 1	9		
9	(Australia) Rory Schlein	3 2 1 1 1	8		
10	(England) Danny King	1 3 0 3 0	7		
11	(Australia) Dakota North	0 1 1 2 2	6		
12	(Sweden) Jacob Thorssell	1 1 2 1 1	6		
13	(England) Richard Lawson	1 1 0 1 2	5		
14	(Denmark) Peter Kildemand	2 0 1 ret -	3		
15	(England) Robert Lambert	0 0 0 0 3	3		
16	(England) James Cockle	0 1	1		
17	(Australia) Davey Watt	0 ret ret - -	0		
18	(England) Scott Campos (res)	0 0	0		

- f=fell, exc=excluded, ret=retired ef=engine failure t-touched tapes

== Final Leading averages ==
Rider	Team	Average
(Denmark) Niels Kristian Iversen	Kings Lynn	9.62
(Australia) Darcy Ward	Poole	9.24
(England) Lewis Blackbird	Eastbourne	8.95
(Slovenia) Matej Žagar	Belle Vue	8.84
(Poland) Maciej Janowski	Poole	8.70
(England) Chris Harris	Coventry	8.69
(Australia) Jason Doyle	Leicester	8.67
(Denmark) Hans Andersen	Coventry	8.63
(Australia) Troy Batchelor	Swindon	8.46
(Poland) Piotr Pawlicki	Wolverhampton	8.36

== Riders & averages ==
Belle Vue

- (Slovenia) Matej Žagar 8.84
- (England) Scott Nicholls 8.25
- (England) Craig Cook 6.97
- (England) Richie Worrall 5.95
- (England) Stefan Nielsen 5.61
- (Denmark) Michael Palm Toft 5.40
- (England) Lee Payne 2.73
- (England) Ben Reade 2.00

Birmingham

- (Sweden) Daniel Nermark 7.13
- (Poland) Adam Skornicki 6.95
- (England) Danny King 6.41
- (England) Paul Starke 6.17
- (England) Ben Barker 5.65
- (Italy) Nicolás Covatti 4.86
- (England) Simon Lambert 4.00
- (England) Edward Kennett 2.72

Coventry

- (England) Chris Harris 8.69
- (Denmark) Hans Andersen 8.63
- (England) Jason Garrity 7.91
- (Denmark) Michael Jepsen Jensen 6.91
- (England) Kyle Howarth 6.74
- (Australia) Max Fricke 6.51
- (Denmark) Kenneth Hansen 5.97
- (Australia) Aaron Summers 5.78
- (United States) Ryan Fisher 5.63
- (England) James Sarjeant 5.27

Eastbourne

- (England) Lewis Blackbird 8.95
- (Denmark) Bjarne Pedersen 7.79
- (Australia) Cameron Woodward 7.24
- (Denmark) Mikkel Michelsen 6.98
- (Finland) Joonas Kylmakorpi 6.62
- (Finland) Timo Lahti 6.10
- (England) Danny Halsey 4.24

Kings Lynn

- (Denmark) Niels Kristian Iversen 9.62
- (England) Lewis Kerr 8.13
- (Denmark) Kenneth Bjerre 7.97
- (Australia) Rory Schlein 7.01
- (Denmark) Nicklas Porsing 6.43
- (England) Simon Lambert 5.94
- (England) Robert Lambert 5.92
- (England) Lewis Rose 5.86

Lakeside

- (Denmark) Mikkel Bech 7.55
- (England) Lewis Bridger 7.52
- (England) Richard Lawson 7.51
- (Australia) Davey Watt 7.23
- (Sweden) Peter Karlsson 7.12
- (Sweden) Kim Nilsson 6.54
- (England) Adam Ellis 5.57
- (England) Ben Morley 5.52
- (England) Danny King 5.27

Leicester

- (Australia) Jason Doyle 8.67
- (England) Simon Stead 7.42
- (Denmark) Nicolai Klindt 6.76
- (Australia) Sam Masters 6.51
- (Denmark) Mads Korneliussen 6.34
- (Sweden) Peter Ljung 5.67
- (Poland) Krzysztof Buczkowski 5.64
- (Denmark) Patrick Hougaard 5.52
- (England) Tom Perry 5.11
- (England) Josh Bates 4.58
- (Denmark) Lasse Bjerre 4.50
- (England) Max Clegg 3.48

Poole

- (Australia) Darcy Ward 9.24
- (Poland) Maciej Janowski 8.70
- (England) Edward Kennett 8.67 (4 matches only)
- (England) Kyle Newman 8.30
- (Australia) Chris Holder 7.23
- (Poland) Przemyslaw Pawlicki 7.20
- (Australia) Josh Grajczonek 7.09
- (Czech Republic) Václav Milík Jr. 6.91
- (England) Brendan Johnson 3.00
- (England) Benji Compton 2.38
- (England) Lee Smart 2.15 (4 matches only)
- (England) Ben Hopwood 2.14

Swindon

- (Australia) Troy Batchelor 8.46
- (Denmark) Peter Kildemand 8.26
- (England) Steve Worrall 7.42
- (Australia) Dakota North 7.10
- (Australia) Nick Morris 7.09
- (Sweden) Simon Gustafsson 6.39
- (Denmark) Nicolai Klindt 5.89
- (England) Nathan Greaves 2.84
- (England) Dan Greenwood 2.36

Wolverhampton

- (Poland) Piotr Pawlicki 8.36
- (England) Tai Woffinden 7.73
- (United States) Ricky Wells 6.76
- (Sweden) Jacob Thorssell 6.54
- (Denmark) Lasse Bjerre 6.50
- (Sweden) Peter Karlsson 5.84
- (England) Ashley Morris 5.45
- (England) Joe Jacobs 5.33
- (Australia) Ty Proctor 5.32
- (England) Tom Perry 4.12

== See also ==
- List of United Kingdom Speedway League Champions
