= Lakeside Hammers =

British speedway team

Club information
- Track address: Arena Essex Raceway; A1306 Arterial Road; Purfleet
- Country: England
- Founded: 1984
- Closed: 2018

Club facts
- Colours: Blue red and white
- Track size: 252 metres (276 yd)
- Track record time: 56.8 seconds
- Track record date: 30 May 2008
- Track record holder: Andreas Jonsson

Major team honours
Knockout Cup (tier 1)	2009
British League Division Two	1991
BL Div Two Four-Team Championship	1991
BL Div 2 KO Cup	1991

The Lakeside Hammers (formerly the Arena-Essex Hammers) were a speedway team who raced in the British league system from 1984 to 2018, most recently racing in the SGB Championship in 2018. The team were nicknamed the Hammers after the West Ham Hammers, a speedway team that closed twelve years earlier. The team's home track, the Arena Essex Raceway, closed shortly before the end of the 2018 season.

== History ==
=== Origins and 1980s ===
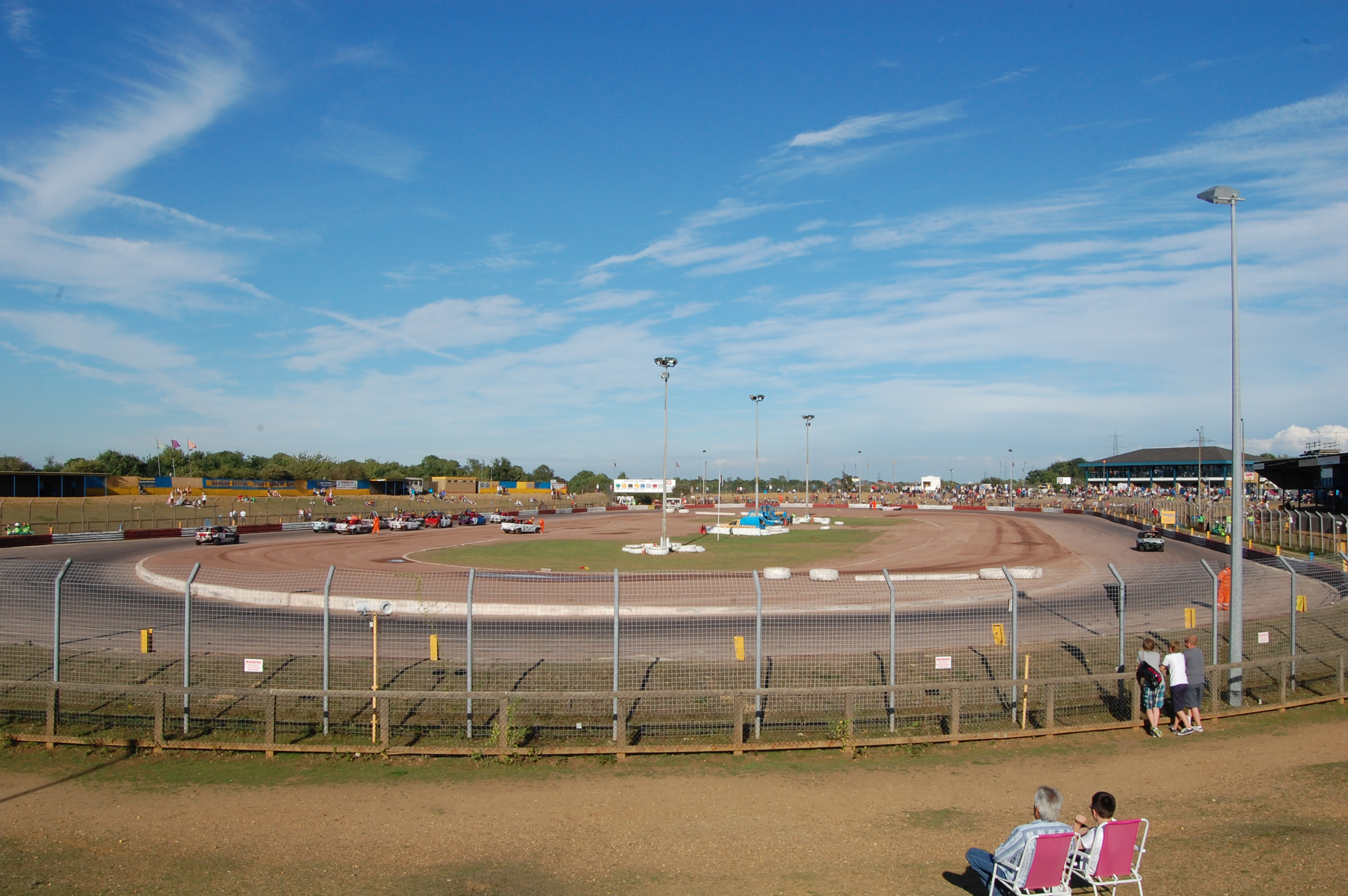
Arena Essex Raceway

The Arena Essex Raceway was built in 1978 to stage banger racing.

Speedway returned to Essex in 1983 following the founding of the Arena-Essex Hammers by promoter Wally Mawdsley and stock car promoter Chick Woodroffe. Former West Ham promoter Mawdsley touted the new club as the successors to or the reincarnation of the old West Ham Speedway, which had closed in the early 1970s – the team took the Hammers nickname, the race colours of white crossed hammers on red and blue halves, and the racenight programmes also carried photos of past West Ham riders from the 1930s through to the early 1970s. There was even a direct link to West Ham speedway within the first Arena-Essex team itself – Alan Sage had ridden for West Ham in 1970 and 1971.

The inaugural 1984 season ended with 14th-place finish but the following two seasons saw an improvement to 6th and 4th respectively. the team's leading rider in the 1980s was Martin Goodwin.

=== 1990s ===
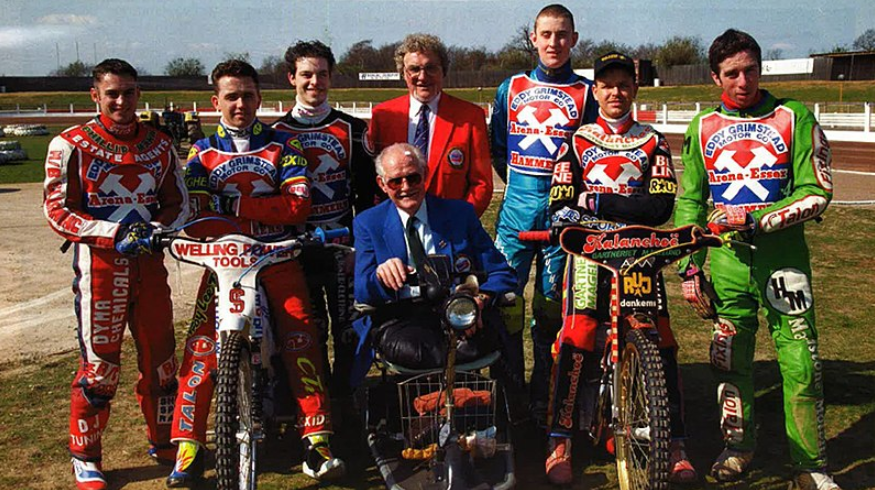
The Hammers in 1997

The speedway track was unusual because it did not have a safety fence as the stock car circuit acted as a run-off area. It was not until 1991 that a safety fence was installed.

It was also in 1991 that major changes were undertaken, Terry Russell and Ivan Henry purchased the club from Chick Woodroffe and they built a new team. Martin Goodwin left the club and six new signings came in. Three Danes (Bo Petersen, Brian Karger and Jan Pedersen) were joined by Alan Mogridge, Andy Galvin and Paul Hurry. The team were dominant, winning 21 of their 22 league matches, winning the Knockout Cup and claiming the fours championship held at the East of England Arena on 21 July.

Following the successful 1991 season the team were promoted to the first division (one of the rare seasons that speedway operated a promotion/relegation system) and remained in the top flight until the end of the 1995 season. The leading rider was Australian Leigh Adams.

A club promotion change resulted in the Hammers dropping to the Conference League for 1996 before moving into the Premier League from 1997.

=== 2000s ===
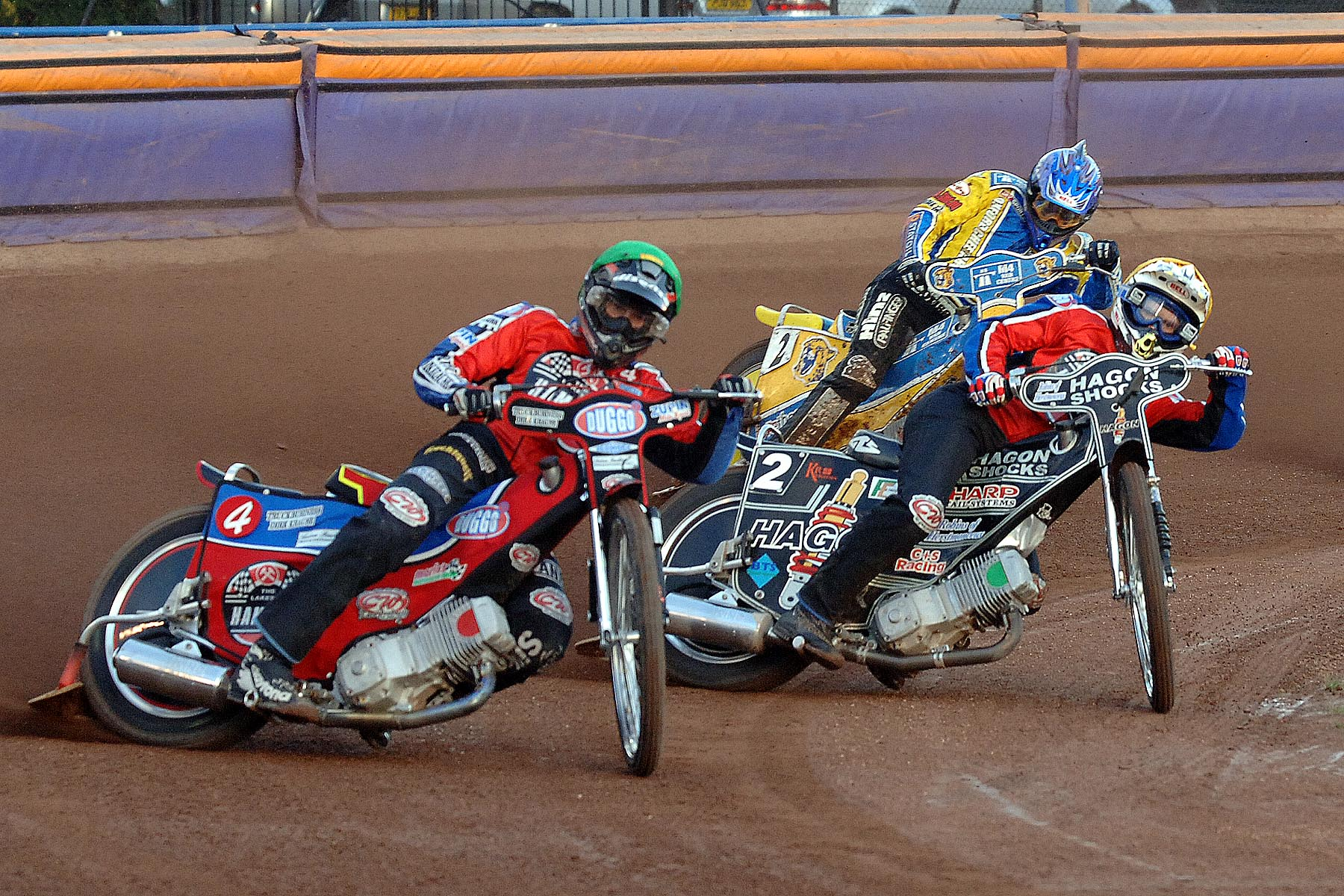
Hefenbrock and Kennett race for the Hammers in 2007

Little of note happened during the early part of the 2000s before the team entered the Elite League in 2004 and signed former world champion Mark Loram. The following season in 2005, two more former world champions were signed in Tony Rickardsson and Gary Havelock and Rickardsson went on to win his sixth world title as a Hammer's rider.

In January 2007, the new promoter Stuart Douglas renamed the team the 'Lakeside' Hammers. In 2008, the club had a successful year, finishing joint top of the Elite League table, but due to race points, were in second place. The Hammers lost three of their top four riders with serious injuries towards the end of the season, but still reached the Craven Shield and Elite League play-off finals.

In 2009, the club won their first piece of silverware since 1991 and their most significant because it was the first trophy won in the highest division. They defeated the Coventry Bees 108–77 on aggregate in the KO Cup Final, with Adam Shields scoring 31 points over two legs.

=== 2010s ===
Lee Richardson led the team into the new decade, with the Hammers making the play-offs on several occasions. The team continued to compete in the top division until they dropped two divisions to race in the National League for 2017.

In 2018, the team opted to move up into the SGB Championship, which would be their last season. In September 2018, speedway racing ceased at the track and the Hammers moved to the Rye House Hoddesdon raceway to complete their fixtures.

=== Thurrock Hammers speedway team ===
Thurrock Hammers Ltd (THL) was incorporated in 2019 with a mission to restore speedway racing to the Thurrock area post sale of The Arena Essex Raceway for housing development. The Thurrock Hammers overall mission is to return speedway to the Thurrock area. Thurrock Hammers started an online petition to support their campaign in order to return speedway racing back the Thurrock area.

== Season summary ==
Extended content

Year and league	Position	Notes
1984 National League season	14th	as Arena Essex Hammers
1985 National League season	6th	
1986 National League season	4th	
1987 National League season	12th	
1988 National League season	9th	
1989 National League season	12th	
1990 National League season	14th	
1991 British League Division Two season	1st	Champions & Knockout Cup, fours
1992 British League season	11th	
1993 British League season	4th	
1994 British League season	8th	
1995 Premier League speedway season	10th	
1996 Speedway Conference League	6th	
1997 Premier League speedway season	7th	
1998 Premier League speedway season	11th	
1999 Premier League speedway season	9th	
2000 Premier League speedway season	13th	
2001 Premier League speedway season	10h	
2002 Premier League speedway season	11th	
2003 Premier League speedway season	7th	
2004 Elite League speedway season	8th	
2005 Elite League speedway season	10th	
2006 Elite League speedway season	11th	
2007 Elite League speedway season	5th	changed name to Lakeside Hammers
2008 Elite League speedway season	2nd	PO final
2009 Elite League speedway season	3rd	Knockout Cup winners
2010 Elite League speedway season	5th	
2011 Elite League speedway season	4th	
2012 Elite League speedway season	4th	
2013 Elite League speedway season	6th	
2014 Elite League speedway season	6th	
2015 Elite League speedway season	8th	
2016 Elite League	4th	
2017 National League speedway season	4th	
SGB Championship 2018	4th	PO final

== Notable riders ==
- (Australia) Leigh Adams
- (England) Andy Galvin
- (England) Martin Goodwin
- (England) Paul Hurry
- (Sweden) Andreas Jonsson
- (Denmark) Brian Karger
- (England) Leigh Lanham
- (England) Alan Mogridge
- (Denmark) Jan Pedersen
- (Denmark) Bo Petersen
- (England) Troy Pratt
- (Sweden) Tony Rickardsson
- (Australia) Adam Shields

== Riders previous seasons ==
Extended content

2018 team

- (Australia) Nick Morris
- (United Kingdom) Richard Lawson
- (United Kingdom) Adam Ellis
- (United Kingdom) Kyle Newman
- (United Kingdom) Ben Morley
- (United Kingdom) Zach Wajtknecht
- (United Kingdom) Alfie Bowtell

2017 team

- (United Kingdom) Zach Wajtknecht
- (United Kingdom) Paul Hurry
- (United Kingdom) Ben Morley
- (United Kingdom) Alfie Bowtell
- (United Kingdom) Connor Locke
- (United Kingdom) Nick Laurence
- (United Kingdom) Jamie Couzins

Also rode:

- (United Kingdom) David Mason
- (United Kingdom) George Hunter

2016 team

- (Sweden) Andreas Jonsson
- (United Kingdom) Lewis Bridger
- (Sweden) Kim Nilsson
- (United Kingdom) Richard Lawson
- (United Kingdom) Edward Kennett
- (Poland) Piotr Swiderski
- (United Kingdom) Lewis Kerr
- (United Kingdom) Robert Mear
- (Sweden) Dennis Jonsson

2015 team

- (Sweden) Andreas Jonsson
- (Denmark) Mikkel Bech Jensen
- (United Kingdom) Richard Lawson (DU)
- (Sweden) Kim Nilsson
- (United Kingdom) Edward Kennett (DU)
- (United Kingdom) Steve Boxall (DU)
- (United Kingdom) Adam Ellis (DU)
- (United Kingdom) Ashley Birks (DU)

2014 team

- (Sweden) Peter Karlsson
- (Australia) Davey Watt
- (United Kingdom) Lewis Bridger
- (Denmark) Mikkel Bech Jensen
- (United Kingdom) Richard Lawson (DU)
- (United Kingdom) Adam Ellis – Fast Track
- (United Kingdom) Ben Morley – Fast Track

2013 team

- (Sweden) Peter Karlsson
- (Australia) Davey Watt
- (Poland) Sebastian Ulamek
- (Poland) Piotr Swiderski
- (United Kingdom) Lewis Bridger
- (United Kingdom) Richard Lawson (DU)
- (Australia) Kevin Doolan(DU)

Also rode:

- (Sweden) Kim Nilsson
- (United Kingdom) Robert Mear

2012 team

The team finished in 4th place out of 10, qualifying for the play-offs, making it the 4th time in 5 years.

- (Sweden) Peter Karlsson 8.61
- (Australia) Davey Watt 8.06
- (Sweden) Jonas Davidsson 5.93
- (Finland) Kauko Nieminen(DU) 4.90
- (United Kingdom) Stuart Robson(DU) 5.09
- (United Kingdom) Robert Mear 4.44
- (Sweden) Kim Nilsson 5.45
- (United Kingdom) Richie Worrall (DU) 3.00
- (Australia) Justin Sedgmen (DU) 3.69

Also rode:

- (United Kingdom) Lee Richardson 8.20

2011 team

The team finished 4th from 10, making the playoffs; however, they were eliminated by Eastbourne in the semi-finals.

- (United Kingdom) Lee Richardson 8.06
- (Sweden) Jonas Davidsson 6.88
- (Poland) Piotr Swiderski 6.23
- (Sweden) Peter Ljung 5.60
- (Finland) Kauko Nieminen(DU) 5.07
- (United Kingdom) Stuart Robson(DU) 5.22
- (United Kingdom) Robert Mear 4.83
- (Sweden) Kim Nilsson 4.15
- (United Kingdom) Jerran Hart(No 8)

Also rode:

- (Australia) Adam Shields
- (Poland) Tomasz Jedrzejak
- (United Kingdom) Chris Neath(DU)
- (Australia) Kevin Doolan(DU)
- (Canada) Kyle Legualt(DU)
- (Czech Republic) Luboš Tomíček, Jr.(No 8)

2010 team

The 2010 team finished in 5th place from 9 teams, narrowly missing out on the playoffs.

- (United Kingdom) Lee Richardson 8.67
- (Sweden) Jonas Davidsson 6.51
- (Australia) Adam Shields 7.39
- (Finland) Kauko Nieminen 5.35
- (United Kingdom) Stuart Robson 4.03
- (Sweden) Peter Ljung 5.17
- (United Kingdom) Paul Hurry 3.91
- (United Kingdom) Chris Neath (No 8) 3.49

Also rode:

- (Poland) Krzysztof Kasprzak 8.33
- (Sweden) Daniel Davidsson 4.91
- (United Kingdom) Jerran Hart (No 8) –

2009 team

Lakeside finished 3rd out of 9, qualifying for the playoffs, but lost to Wolverhampton in the playoff semi-finals. The team became K.O Cup Champions by defeating Coventry.

- (United Kingdom) Lee Richardson 8.56
- (Sweden) Jonas Davidsson 7.97
- (Finland) Joonas Kylmäkorpi 6.02
- (Finland) Kauko Nieminen 5.63
- (United Kingdom) Stuart Robson 4.17
- (United Kingdom) Phil Morris(DU) 3.56
- (United Kingdom) Chris Mills(DU) 2.29
- (United Kingdom) Robert Mear (No 8) 3.23
- (Australia) Adam Shields 7.79

Also rode:

- (Poland) Piotr Swiderski 7.82

(DU) Riders doubling-up between Premier and Elite League

2008 team

The team finished joint top on points with Poole, but lost the playoff final to an aggregate score of 108 – 75 to the Pirates. They also reached the Final of the Craven Shield, losing to Coventry.

- (Sweden) Andreas Jonsson 9.66
- (Australia) Adam Shields 8.10
- (Poland) Tomasz Jedrzejak 6.40
- (Sweden) Jonas Davidsson 6.75
- (United Kingdom) Leigh Lanham 5.10
- (Sweden) Ricky Kling 4.90
- (Poland) Krzysztof Jablonski –
- (Finland) Kauko Nieminen (No.8) 6.56

Also Rode:

- (Finland) Joonas Kylmäkorpi 5.96
- (United Kingdom) Chris Mills (as No.8) –
- (Czech Republic) Luboš Tomíček, Jr. 4.48
- (Poland) Tomasz Piszcz 2.00

2007 team

The revamped Lakeside Hammers finished 5th from 10 teams (after the closure of Oxford).

- (Sweden) Andreas Jonsson 8.00
- (Finland) Joonas Kylmäkorpi 6.12
- (Poland) Krzysztof Kasprzak 8.68
- (Australia) Adam Shields 7.40
- (United Kingdom) Leigh Lanham 5.05
- (Czech Republic) Luboš Tomíček, Jr. 3.37
- (Sweden) Ricky Kling 3.49
- (Sweden) Andreas Messing 3.11
- (United Kingdom) Chris Mills (No.8) 2.86

Also Rode

- (Germany) Christian Hefenbrock 4.05
- (United Kingdom) Paul Hurry 4.00
- (Denmark) Henning Bager 4.07
- (United Kingdom) Chris Neath –

2006 team

Arena Essex finished 11th out of 11, placing them bottom of the Elite League for a second consecutive season.

- (Denmark) Henning Bager 5.20
- (United Kingdom) Paul Hurry 5.35
- (Finland) Joonas Kylmäkorpi 7.56
- (United Kingdom) Leigh Lanham 5.92
- (Sweden) Mikael Max 6.33
- (Sweden) Andreas Messing 2.88
- (Australia) Steve Johnston 5.59

Also Rode

- (Sweden) Andreas Jonsson 7.56
- (Poland) Mariusz Puszakowski 3.26
- (Poland) Łukasz Romanek 1.40
- (United Kingdom) Shaun Tacey (No.8) 3.25
- (United States) Brent Werner (No.8) 3.75

2005 team

The 2005 side finished bottom of the Elite League.

- (United Kingdom) Mark Loram 7.75
- (Poland) Adam Skornicki 5.96
- (United Kingdom) Gary Havelock 5.60
- (United Kingdom) Leigh Lanham 5.39
- (United Kingdom) Paul Hurry 4.76
- (Russia) Sergei Darkin 5.12
- (Russia) Roman Povazhny 5.08
- (United Kingdom) Phil Morris (No.8) 4.02

Also Rode

- (Sweden) Tony Rickardsson 9.83
- (United States) Josh Larsen 4.00
- (Poland) Piotr Świst 3.67

2004 team

Although the team finished 8th from 10 in their first season in the Elite League, they were 14 points above 9th place.

- (United Kingdom) Mark Loram 9.66
- (Russia) Roman Povazhny 5.71
- (United Kingdom) Dean Barker 5.67
- (Poland) Grzegorz Walasek 5.02
- (United Kingdom) Paul Hurry 5.13
- (United Kingdom) Leigh Lanham 5.21
- (United States) Josh Larsen 5.10
- (United Kingdom) Ray Morton (No.8) –

Also Rode

- (Denmark) Ronni Pedersen 3.70
- (United Kingdom) Kelvin Tatum 5.75

2003 team

The team finished 7th out of 18 teams. It would be their last at Premier League level.

- (Finland) Joonas Kylmakorpi 9.06
- (United Kingdom) Leigh Lanham 9.38
- (United Kingdom) Kelvin Tatum 7.85
- (Denmark) Henning Bager 5.68
- (United Kingdom) Jason King 3.96
- (United Kingdom) Danny King 2.82
- (Australia) Lee Herne 4.76

Also Rode

- (Sweden) David Ruud 7.41
- (United Kingdom) Andy Galvin 3.15

1998 team

The team finished 11th out of 13 teams.

- (United Kingdom) Troy Pratt
- (United Kingdom) Matt Read
- (Denmark) Jan Pedersen 8.71
- (United Kingdom) Colin White
- (United Kingdom) Leigh Lanham
- (United Kingdom) Paul Lyde-Uings
- (United Kingdom) Nathan Morton
