= Lee Richardson (speedway rider) =

British motorcycle speedway rider

- Born: 25 April 1979; Hastings, England
- Died: 13 May 2012 (aged 33); Wrocław, Poland
- Nickname: Rico
- Nationality: British (English)

Career history

Great Britain
- 1995, 1997–1999: Reading Racers
- 1996, 1999: Poole Pirates
- 1997, 2004: Peterborough Panthers
- 1997: King's Lynn Stars
- 2000–2003: Coventry Bees
- 2005–2007: Swindon Robins
- 2008: Eastbourne Eagles
- 2009–2012: Lakeside Hammers

Poland
- 1999: Piła
- 2000: Grudziądz
- 2001, 2004–2005: Zielona Góra
- 2002: Wrocław
- 2003: Lublin
- 2006–2009: Częstochowa
- 2010–2012: Rzeszów

Sweden
- 1998–1999: Filbyterna
- 2000–2003: Rospiggarna
- 2004–2010: Vetlanda
- 2011–2012: Vargarna

Individual honours
- 1999: World Under-21 Champion
- 2002: GP Challenge
- 2003: Elite League Riders Champion

Team honours
- 1997: Premier League Champion
- 1998: Premier League KO Cup Champion
- 2005: Elite League Pairs Champion
- 2008, 2009: Elite League KO Cup winner
- 2001, 2002: Swedish Elitserien

Lee Stewart Richardson (25 April 1979 – 13 May 2012) was a British international motorcycle speedway rider.

== Career ==
Richardson made his British debut for the Reading Racers in 1995.

Richardson represented Great Britain at senior and under-21 level and featured in several World Cup tournaments. Richardson was World Under 21 champion in 1999.

In October 2002, during the Speedway Grand Prix Qualification, Richardson won the GP Challenge, which ensured that he claimed a permanent slot for the 2003 Grand Prix. He won the Elite League Riders' Championship, held at Brandon Stadium on 18 October 2003.

Richardson was also a fully fledged Grand Prix rider for four seasons from 2003 until 2006. Richardson joined the Lakeside Hammers for the 2009 season.

== Death ==
On 13 May 2012, Richardson died of internal bleeding in a Wrocław hospital following a collision with a safety fence during a Polish League match.

== Family ==
Richardson's mother Julie was a presenter for ScreenSport Television. His father Colin is a former rider. His uncle Steve Weatherley, another rider, was paralysed in a crash with Vic Harding whilst racing in a meeting at the Hackney Wick Stadium (Harding later died in hospital).

== Speedway Grand Prix results ==
Year	Position	Points	Best finish	Notes
2000	31st	3	19th	1 wild card appearance
2002	25th	17	5th	2 wild card appearances. 5th in British Grand Prix
2003	16th	45	7th	Missed 2 Grands Prix through injury
2004	11th	76	3rd	3rd in British Grand Prix
2005	13th	55	2nd	2nd in Polish Grand Prix
2006	15th	39	8th	

== See also ==
- Rider deaths in motorcycle speedway
