= Adam Shields =

Australian speedway rider

- Born: 8 February 1977 (age 49); Kurri Kurri, New South Wales, Australia
- Nationality: Australian

Career history

Great Britain
- 2000–2003: Isle of Wight Islanders
- 2002: King's Lynn Stars
- 2002: Poole Pirates
- 2002–2006, 2013: Eastbourne Eagles
- 2007–2011: Lakeside Hammers
- 2012: Belle Vue Aces

Sweden
- 2003: Gasarna
- 2004–2005, 2009–2010, 2012: Vargarna
- 2007: Hammarby
- 2008: Rospiggarna
- 2011: Västervik

Poland
- 2006: Lublin
- 2008–2010: Leszno
- 2011: Wrocław

Individual honours
- 2002: Premier League Riders' champion
- 2005: NSW State Champion

Team honours
- 2002: Pairs Championship winner

Adam Matthew Shields (born 8 February 1977 in Kurri Kurri, New South Wales, is an Australian former international motorcycle speedway rider, who has ridden for multiple teams in the British speedway.

== Speedway career ==
Shields first rode in the United Kingdom for Premier League team the Isle of Wight Islanders in 2000, before stepping up to the Elite League for Eastbourne Eagles and then the Lakeside Hammers in 2007. He missed the end of the 2008 season due a number of injuries sustained during a race.

Shields has appeared in the Speedway World Cup for Australia and he won the Australian Under-21 Speedway Championship in 1997.

In 2002, Shields won the Premier League Riders Championship, during the 2002 Premier League speedway season. He also won the Premier League Pairs Championship partnering Danny Bird for the Isle of Wight.

On 5 May 2012, Shields announced his retirement from the sport, citing personal reasons, but returned in 2013 with Eastbourne for one final season.
