= Robert Mear =

British speedway rider

- Born: 12 January 1989 (age 37); Welwyn Garden City, Hertfordshire
- Nationality: British (English)

Career history
- 2004-2009, 2013: Rye House Rockets
- 2009, 2011-2013, 2016: Lakeside Hammers

Robert John Mear (born 12 January 1989) is a former motorcycle speedway rider from England. He earned two international caps for the Great Britain national speedway team.

== Speedway career ==
Mear started his speedway career in England riding for the Rye House Rockets in 2004. He rode for Lakeside Hammers in 2009 and 2011–2013, and would later represent them in them in the top tier of British Speedway riding in the 2016 Elite League.
