= Elite League (speedway) =

Motorcycle racing league (1997–2016)

- Formerly: replaced the British League
- Sport: Speedway
- Founded: 1997
- Folded: 2016
- Replaced by: SGB Premiership
- Administrator: Speedway Control Bureau
- No. of teams: 8
- Country: United Kingdom
- Last champion: Wolverhampton Wolves
- Most titles: Poole Pirates (7)
- Website: www.speedwaygb.co

The Elite League was the top division of speedway league competition in the United Kingdom, governed by the Speedway Control Bureau (SCB), in conjunction with the British Speedway Promoters' Association (BSPA). It was founded in 1997 and was sponsored by Sky Sports until the end of the 2013 season. In 2016, the Elite League featured 8 teams, unlike 10 in 2014, during a season which ran between March and October. Each team had a designated race day on which they normally staged their home fixtures, and they regularly had home and away fixtures scheduled in the same week.

The Elite League operated for 20 years until British speedway was restructured with the formation of the SGB Premiership and SGB Championship.

== Brief history ==
The British League was formed in 1965 as the sole professional speedway league in Britain, expanding in 1968 to incorporate two divisions. In 1995 & 1996 there was a single professional tier known as the Premier League (an amalgamation of the British League Division One and the British League Division Two), before the Elite League was created as a new top tier in 1997. The Championship was decided on a straight league table basis until 2001. A play-off system was introduced in 2002, with the top four in the table taking part in a knockout competition to decide the champions.

== League format ==
Each team raced every other team in the league home and away, and then raced five teams again home and twice away, giving a total of 38 meetings. The first of these home and away fixtures are called the 'A' fixtures, the second are the 'B' fixtures.

Teams were awarded two points for a win, one point for a draw and from 2008 three points for an away win. Placings were determined by points accumulated over all matches. Where two or more teams were tied on league points, the team with the greater difference of race points scored over race points conceded was placed higher.

The top four teams qualified for the play-offs. The semi-finals were single matches with the top two league positions having home advantage (1st vs 3rd and 2nd vs 4th). Winners from the semi-finals then met in a two-legged final to decide the Elite League winner.

From 2008, promotion and relegation between the Elite League and Premier League was introduced for the first time since 1991. The team finishing last faced the Premier League play-off winner over two legs (one match at each track), with the aggregate winner taking the Elite League spot in the following season, and the losing team racing in the Premier League. There is now no relegation from the Elite League, although teams can apply to move up or down between leagues.

For 2014 it was announced that each Elite League team would field two British riders from lower leagues at reserve. These would be picked from a draft of 23 riders. Riders were picked in two rounds, with the club finishing bottom of the league in 2013 getting the first pick.

== Teams ==
=== Team building ===
At the start of each season, teams were built up to maximum points limit. The combined Calculated Match Average (CMA) of the best five riders declared in the team was limited to an agreed figure set at the British Speedway Promoters' Association (BSPA) Annual General Meeting. For the 2015 the limit was 34.

=== 2016 teams ===
Team	Years Active	Team	Years Active
Belle Vue Aces	1997–	Leicester Lions	2014–
Coventry Bees	1997–	Poole Pirates	1997–
Kings Lynn Stars	1997–2002, 2011–	Swindon Robins	1997–1998, 2004–
Lakeside Hammers	2004–	Wolverhampton Wolves	1997–

=== Former teams ===
Team	Years Active	Other Information
Birmingham Brummies	2011–2014	(14 July 2014 went out of business), reformed for 2015 in the National League.
Eastbourne Eagles	1997–2014	Moved to National League.
Peterborough Panthers	1997–2013	Moved to Premier League.
Ipswich Witches	1997–2010	Moved to Premier League.
Reading Bulldogs	2006–2007	Moved to Premier League.
Oxford Cheetahs	1998–2007*	Closure. *(Resigned halfway through 2007 season, results were then erased from season)
Hull Vikings	1999	Moved to Premier League.
Bradford Dukes	1997	Closure.

== Competitions ==
=== Elite League ===
==== Champions ====
Season	Champions	Second	Third
1997	Bradford Dukes	Eastbourne Eagles	Swindon Robins
1998	Ipswich Witches	Belle Vue Aces	Coventry Bees
1999	Peterborough Panthers	Poole Pirates	King's Lynn Knights
2000	Eastbourne Eagles	King's Lynn Knights	Ipswich Witches
2001	Oxford Cheetahs	Poole Pirates	Coventry Bees
2002	Wolverhampton Wolves	Eastbourne Eagles	Coventry Bees / Poole Pirates
2003	Poole Pirates	Coventry Bees	Peterborough Panthers / Oxford Cheetahs
2004	Poole Pirates	Wolverhampton Wolves	Ipswich Witches / Eastbourne Eagles
2005	Coventry Bees	Belle Vue Aces	Peterborough Panthers / Eastbourne Eagles
2006	Peterborough Panthers	Reading Racers	Swindon Robins / Coventry Bees
2007	Coventry Bees	Swindon Robins	Poole Pirates / Peterborough Panthers
2008	Poole Pirates	Lakeside Hammers	Swindon Robins / Ipswich Witches
2009	Wolverhampton Wolves	Swindon Robins	Lakeside Hammers / Coventry Bees
2010	Coventry Bees	Poole Pirates	Wolverhampton Wolves / Peterborough Panthers
2011	Poole Pirates	Eastbourne Eagles	Kings Lynn Stars / Lakeside Hammers
2012	Swindon Robins	Poole Pirates	Lakeside Hammers / Birmingham Brummies
2013	Poole Pirates	Birmingham Brummies	Swindon Robins / Wolverhampton Wolves
2014	Poole Pirates	Coventry Bees	King's Lynn Stars / Swindon Robins
2015	Poole Pirates	Belle Vue Aces	Coventry Bees / Swindon Robins
2016	Wolverhampton Wolves	Belle Vue Aces	Poole Pirates / Lakeside Hammers

== See also ==
- List of United Kingdom Speedway League Champions
