= Piotr Świderski =

Polish speedway rider

- Born: 11 May 1983 (age 43); Rawicz, Poland
- Nationality: Polish

Career history

Poland
- 2002–2003: Rawicz
- 2004–2006, 2010–2011: Wrocław
- 2007–2006: Zielona Góra
- 2008: Rybnik
- 2009, 2016: Tarnów
- 2012: Gdańsk
- 2013: Gniezno
- 2014–2015: Gorzów

Great Britain
- 2006–2007: Peterborough
- 2008–2009: Ipswich
- 2009, 2011, 2013, 2016: Lakeside
- 2015: Leicester

Sweden
- 2008–2011: Lejonen
- 2014: Indianerna

Individual honours
- 2014: Alfred Smoczyk Memorial winner

Team honours
- 2006, 2014: Polish Ekstraliga
- 2006: Elite League
- 2008: Swedish Elitserien

Piotr Świderski (born 11 May 1983 in Rawicz, Poland) is a former motorcycle speedway rider from Poland.

== Career history ==
In his native Poland, Świderski rode for 15 seasons from 2002 until 2016. During the 2011 Polish speedway season, Świderski broke his leg while riding for Wrocław.

Świderski rode for the Peterborough Panthers in 2006 and 2007 before being loaned out to Ipswich from 2008 to 2009. After being dropped by Ipswich, he went on to ride for Lakeside Hammers in the British Elite League.

In 2015, Świderski signed for Leicester Lions to replace the retired Lewis Bridger, which turned out to be his final season in British speedway.
