= Arena Essex Raceway =

Car racing track in Essex, England

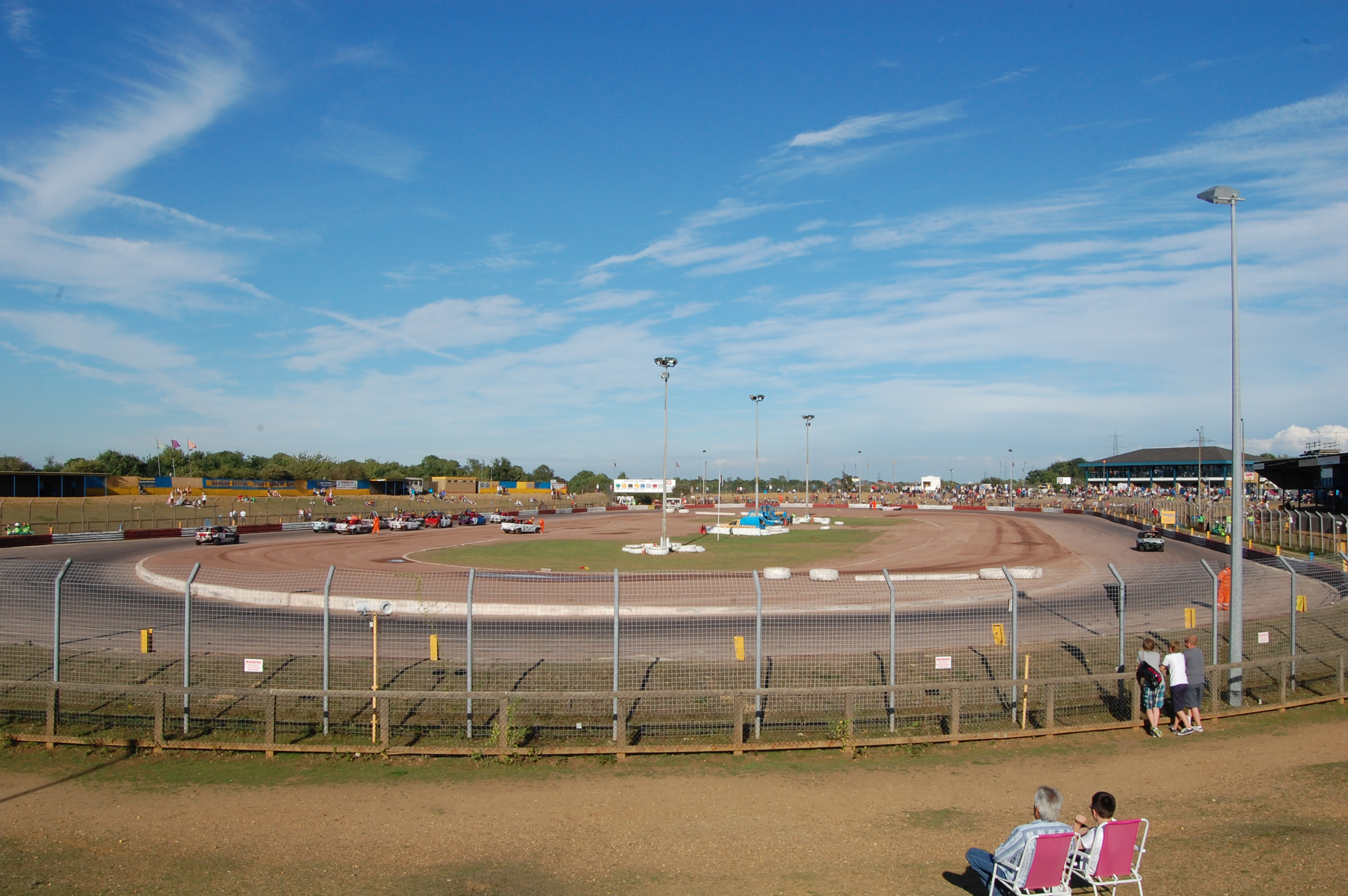
- Arena Essex Raceway
- Location: Purfleet, Essex, England
- Coordinates: 51°29′39″N 0°16′58″E
- Operator: PRI
- Opened: 1 May 1978
- Closed: 30 November 2018
- Major events: Rods; Stock cars Bangers; Demolition derby Speedway

Oval
- Length: 0.252 km (0.157 mi)
- Turns: 4 Turns

Arena Essex Raceway was a stock car and speedway racing track located near Purfleet, Essex. It opened in 1978 and closed in 2018. The Lakeside Shopping Centre was built close to the venue.

== The stadium ==
The Arena-Essex Raceway Complex was the idea of local businessman and racing driver, Chick Woodroffe. It was built in the remains of an old cement works overspill site. The new circuit was a quarter-mile long with the first stock car race meeting held on 1 May 1978 which was infamously ruined by a heavy downpour. The track originally had a post and wire fence, which caused some colossal crashes and wrecks in the banger formula, and caught a few of the hot rods out too. In the late 80's the track swapped the post and wire for an Armco barrier and catch-fencing was installed to further protect spectators.

Every September, the track hosted the oldest National World Final Championship, which ran for over 40 years. If possible, just over 40 cars, plus qualifiers from the wild card race, competed in the world final event. Banger turnouts varied between 35 and 174 cars at the world final meetings. The winner from the previous year started the final in last place.

Sunday 4 November 2018 was the last meeting ever to be held at the raceway. It shut its gates for the last time after being offered £80 million for the site by housing developers. Demolition work on the stadium began in November 2020.

The stadium was further sold in July 2023 to a hyperscaler and the subsequent plans for housing were withdrawn.

== Banger Racing ==
Banger Racing took place on Sunday afternoons and Bank Holiday Mondays between the second week of March and the first week of November. There were different disciplines of bangers at Arena, such as Rookie Bangers, 2L Bangers, National Bangers, Team Bangers, Big Van Bangers, Caravan Destruction Derbies and Unlimited Bangers.

The oldest car raced at Arena Essex Raceway was a 1928 Dodge Standard Six which started at the back in Firecracker XIII 2004. It is said to be one of the oldest Bangers ever raced and after the meeting, was later sold to be used in a movie about damaged cars.

== PRI Banger World Final Winners ==
The PRI National Banger World Final is the longest running world final in banger racing. It was first staged at Arena Essex Raceway in 1980, at the time it served alternate years with the Crayford stadium until 1984, at which point the Arena circuit became the sole venue for the event. In the early years, the race was dominated, as was much of the PRI banger scene, by cars from the BMC stable. 13 of the first 15 PRI world finals were won by a BMC vehicle, most often in the form of an Austin Cambridge or Morris Oxford. However, as the sport progressed it was the Ford manufacturer which became extremely dominant, indeed the following 33 world finals have been won by either a Cortina (1984), Granada (1985-2008) or Mondeo (2009-2018.) The first PRI world final was also won by a Ford in the shape of a Consul, whilst the only other winner has come in the form of an FSO 125p in 1982. Following the closure of Arena Essex in 2018, the title was transferred to Mendips Raceway, near Cheddar in Somerset. It was won by Ashley Garrod

Champions:

- 1971 Kevin McAuley
- 1972 John McGirr
- 1973 Peter Miles
- 1974 Peter Miles
- 1975 Brain Boulton
- 1976 Brain Boulton
- 1977 John Govier
- 1978 Bill Smith
- 1979 Terry Betts
- 1980 Tony Wise
- 1981 John Govier
- 1982 Dave Sanderson
- 1983 John King
- 1984 Trevor Jones
- 1985 Les Mapp
- 1986 Tony Wade
- 1987 Steve Taylor
- 1988 Dennis Whiteman
- 1989 Steve Taylor
- 1990 Kevin Wilsher
- 1991 Steve Taylor
- 1992 Gray Sheldon
- 1993 Chris Whiteman
- 1994 Vince Wolf
- 1995 Ian Cadman
- 1996 Mark Boulden
- 1997 Alan Trickett
- 1998 John Harris
- 1999 Phil Hudson
- 2000 Richard Ahern
- 2001 Andrew Davies
- 2002 Brett Ellacott
- 2003 Andrew Davies
- 2004 Wayne Cotterill
- 2005 Matt Fuller
- 2006 Billy King
- 2007 Paul Whiteman
- 2008 Carl Overy
- 2009 Matt Fuller
- 2010 Lee Hughes
- 2011 Lee Hughes
- 2012 Billy King
- 2013 Jason Jackson
- 2014 Scott Cornish
- 2015 Georgie Lee
- 2016 Jason Jackson
- 2017 Adam Hitchcock
- 2018 Dean Goodearl
- 2019 Ashley Garrod

== Firecracker ==
Firecracker was founded in 1991 and was by far one of, if not the most popular event at Arena Essex. Firecracker was a Banger racing only meeting; the main attraction to this event is the specific car rulings in place which outlaws more 'common' Bangers such as the Ford Granada. Originally, the meeting allowed all types of unlimited Bangers to race, but when the rule banning common cars was enforced, the meeting took off in popularity. The landmark ruling made it 'THE' meeting of the year where drivers could race their rare classics and bigger vehicles that were not suited to normal Banger events. At the conclusion of the meeting, there was also a firework display put on by the local 'Shellshock Fireworks' company.

In 2008, due to banger numbers falling, 1300cc Stock Cars were introduced as a support formula, however in 2010 Reliant Robins were swapped as the support formula, proving to be a popular move among fans. Stock Cars were re-introduced in the 2-Litre format from 2015 onward, due to a further drop in Banger and Robin numbers.

The final meeting in 2018 featured neither Reliant Robins or Stock Cars in support, as the stadium's closure boosted the Banger turnout above and beyond any meeting in the stadium's history.

== Speedway ==
Speedway was introduced in 1984. They were founded (as the Arena-Essex Hammers) by promoter Wally Mawdsley and stock car promoter Chick Woodroffe. The team were nicknamed the Hammers after the West Ham Hammers team that closed twelve years earlier. The speedway team was renamed the Lakeside Hammers in 2007. The Hammers raced at the Arena Essex Raceway on most Friday evenings between March and October and competed in the SGB Championship, the second tier of Britain's speedway leagues. The Hammers were crowned Elite League Knockout Cup champions in 2009.
