= 2011 Sheffield Tigers season =

- League: 2011 Premier League speedway
- Premier League KOC: 2nd Round
- Biggest win: Home: Tigers 59-31 Monarchs; Away: Tigers 53-40 Rebels
- Biggest defeat: Home: Tigers 43-47 Rebels; Away: Tigers 35-55 Monarchs
- Highest averaged rider: (United Kingdom) Josh Auty

2011 Sheffield Tigers season

Current team
Rider	CMA
(United Kingdom) Josh Auty	8.09
(United Kingdom) Ricky Ashworth	8.00
(Australia) Shane Parker	7.96
(Argentina) Emiliano Sanchez	6.47
(Australia) Hugh Skidmore	5.89
(United Kingdom) Simon Lambert	4.00
(United Kingdom) Ashley Birks	3.20
Total	43.61

The 2011 Premier League Season is the 15th consecutive season that the Sheffield Tigers has competed at the 2nd tier of British Speedway. Following from a successful 2010 Campaign, the Tigers hope to end their 8-year wait for the Premier League Title.

== Close season ==
After ending the 2010 campaign with the first team trophy (Premier League Pairs) since 2002, the Tigers will be hoping go one step further in 2011. For the 5th season running, The Tigers will be sponsored by local business Sheffield Window Centre for the following season. Following the AGM meeting over the weekend of the 20/21 November, the Tigers declared their intention to race over the 2011 however there will be a new look to Premier League Speedway. Local rivals Stoke Potters withdrew from the Premier League to race in the National League, while the Birmingham Brummies elected to move up to the Elite League. This allowed 2 new teams to enter, with the Leicester Lions successfully being granted entry after failing in 2010, and the Ipswich Witches deciding to swap league memberships with the Brummies to fill the allocated spots. However, with the Elite League seemingly in turmoil with the withdrawals of the Coventry Bees and the Peterborough Panthers, the Elite League required 1 further team to be able to track a full season. The Kings Lynn Stars elected to join the speedway elite and therefore withdrew from the Premier League. This further allowed another entry to the Premier League, with the place being allocated to the Plymouth Devils. This was later confirmed that no other teams will be granted entry to the Premier League, therefore completing the line-up for 2011.

== Team Building for 2011 ==
Following the 2009 AGM, it was decided that a 42.50 points limit would be set for 3 years, with the 2011 season being the last. This was later confirmed at the current AGM. However, before the AGM took place the Tigers had already announced 2 riders who would be riding in the yellow and blue of the Tigers for 2011. On 22 October, Josh Auty was the first confirmed starter for his 3rd consecutive season for Sheffield. Then on 3 November, Hugh Skidmore was the second confirmed starter for his 2nd full season with the Owlerton outfit. Following Kings Lynn's election to the Elite League, Simon Lambert (Kings Lynn's Asset) became available and was snapped up by the tigers on 1 December as their 3rd signing for the 2011 season. The same day, it was announced that club asset Emiliano Sanchez was recalled to the 2011 team. Sanchez was loaned out to Redcar last year. Sanchez has not ridden for Sheffield since 2006. After weeks of talks with ex-captain Ricky Ashworth, it was announced on 6 December 2010 that Ricky would once again ride for Sheffield for his 10th successive year. Due to his ten years with the Tigers, Ricky will now be due a Testimonial Meeting in 2011. The sixth signing was officially announced on 15 December to be current Sheffield Tigers Asset Shane Parker. Although Shane has never ridden for the Tigers before, he became a Sheffield Asset when the Hull Vikings closed and Sheffield purchased all the current Hull Assets. After announcing Shane as the new number 1 for 2011, Shane announced that this would be his last season riding British Speedway before returning home to Australia. The Tigers septet was completed on 22 December with the signing of local rider Ashley Birks from Scunthorpe. It isn't however confirmed whether it was a full transfer or a loan.

=== 2011 Team Averages ===
Rider	Current CMA	Opening CMA	May; CMA	June; CMA	July; CMA	August; CMA	September; CMA	October; CMA	Closing; CMA
(United Kingdom) Josh Auty	8.09	7.52	7.98	8.09					
(United Kingdom) Ricky Ashworth	8.00	7.77	8.05	8.00					
(Australia) Shane Parker	7.96	7.95	7.82	7.96					
(Argentina) Emiliano Sanchez	6.47	6.64	6.46	6.47					
(Australia) Hugh Skidmore	5.89	5.69	5.80	5.89					
(United Kingdom) Simon Lambert	4.00	3.47	3.87	4.00					
(United Kingdom) Ashley Birks	3.20	3.00	3.00	3.20					

== 2011 Fixtures ==
Official Fixture List is yet to be produced. Therefore, no fixture list is yet available.
The opening fixture for the season was an inter-league challenge against local rivals Belle Vue Aces. The meeting is the second meeting of the teams in as many years, as the Aces were the opening challenge meeting of the 2010 season.
It was also confirmed at the BSPA AGM that the Tigers would face the Edinburgh Monarchs in the 1st round of the 2011 Premier League KOC. No dates have yet been confirmed.

=== Premier League First Phase ===
==== Home Meetings ====
31 March 2011	Report	Sheffield Tigers	51–41	Berwick Bandits	Owlerton Stadium, Sheffield
3 League Points	0 League Points

1	(Australia) Shane Parker	2', 3, 0, 3, 1'	9+2
2	(Australia) Hugh Skidmore	3, 1, 3, 2, 2	11
3	(England) Ricky Ashworth	R, 3, 1, 2	6
4	(Argentina) Emiliano Sanchez	1, 1, 3, 3	8
5	(England) Josh Auty	3, 3, 3, R	9
6	(England) Ashley Birks	2', 0, 0, 1	3+1
7	(England) Simon Lambert	3, 1, 1, 0	5

1	(Denmark) Charlie Gjedde	1, 2, 2, 2	7
2	(Czech Republic) Hynek Stichauer	R, 0, 2, 1'	3+1
3	(Australia) Kozza Smith	3, 4^, 1, 3, 0	11
4	(Czech Republic) Josef Franc	2', 1', 3, 2, 3	11+2
5	(England) Lee Complin	2, 2, 2, 1'	7+1
6	(Hungary) Tamas Sike	1, 0, 0, 1	2
7	(New Zealand) Jade Mudgway	0, 0, 0, 0	0

7 April 2011	Report	Sheffield Tigers	56–35	Newport Wasps	Owlerton Stadium, Sheffield
3 League Points	0 League Points

1	(Australia) Shane Parker	2', 2, 3, 2', 3	12+2
2	(Australia) Hugh Skidmore	3, 1', 3, 2'	9+2
3	(England) Ricky Ashworth	1', 3, 3, 3, 1	11+1
4	(Argentina) Emiliano Sanchez	2, 2', 2', 1'	7+3
5	(England) Josh Auty	R, 3, R, 3	6
6	(England) Ashley Birks	3, F, Fx – Withdrawn	3
7	(England) Simon Lambert	1, 3, 2', 0, 2	8+1

1	(England) Leigh Lanham	R, 1, 3, 1, 0	5
2	(Sweden) Robin Aspegren	1, R, F, 2'	3+1
3	(England) Joe Haines	R, 1', 0, 2	3+1
4	(Canada) Kyle Legault	3, 4^, 1, 3, 2	13
5	(Sweden) Kim Nilsson	1', 3, F^, 0	4+1
6	(Australia) Mark Jones	2, 0, 1, 1'	4+1
7	(Australia) Todd Kurtz	0, 2, 1, 0	3

14 April 2011	Report	Sheffield Tigers	43–47	Somerset Rebels	Owlerton Stadium, Sheffield
0 League Points	3 League Points

1	(Australia) Shane Parker	1, 3, 1', 3, 3	11+1
2	(Australia) Hugh Skidmore	0, 1, 3, 2	6
3	(England) Ricky Ashworth	3, 3, 3, R	9
4	(Argentina) Emiliano Sanchez	0, 0, 2', 2	4+1
5	(England) Josh Auty	3, 1, 3, F, 0	6
6	(England) Simon Lambert	3, 0, 0, 1, 0	4
7	(England) Ashley Birks	1, 0, 1	2

1	(Australia) Travis McGowan	2', 2, 2, 1', 1'	8+3
2	(England) Kyle Hughes	Rider Replacement	(5+2)
3	(Germany) Christian Hefenbrock	2, 3, R, 3, 3, 2	13
4	(Australia) Sam Masters	1', 2', 0, 1	4+2
5	(Australia) Cory Gathercole	2, 0, 1, 2	5
6	(Australia) Dakota North	Fx, 1', 2, 2, 1', 2', 3	11+3
7	(Australia) James Holders	3, 2, 1', 0	6+1

21 April 2011	Report	Sheffield Tigers	56–36	Ipswich Witches	Owlerton Stadium, Sheffield
3 League Points	0 League Points

1	(Australia) Shane Parker	1', 3, 2, 1	7+1
2	(Argentina) Emiliano Sanchez	2, 1, 2', 0	5+1
3	(England) Josh Auty	2', 0, 3, 3	8+1
4	(Australia) Hugh Skidmore	3, 1, 2', 2', 0	8+2
5	(England) Ricky Ashworth	3, 3, 3, 3, 3	15
6	(England) Simon Lambert	2', 1, 1, 3	7+1
7	(England) Ashley Birks	3, 0, 3, 0	6

1	(Australia) Kevin Doolan	3, 3, 4^, 2, 2	14
2	(Australia) Taylor Poole	0, 2', Fx, 0	2+1
3	(Denmark) Lasse Bjerre	1, 0, 3, 2, 1'	7+1
4	(Denmark) Morten Risager	0, 2, 1, 1	4
5	(England) Chris Schramm	2, 2, 1^, 0	5
6	(England) Jerran Hart	0, 0, 0	0
7	(England) Kyle Howarth (G)	1, 1, 1, 1', 0	4+1

28 April 2011	Report	Sheffield Tigers	52–44	Glasgow Tigers	Owlerton Stadium, Sheffield
3 League Points	0 League Points

1	(Australia) Shane Parker	2', 3, 3, 3, 3	14+1
2	(Argentina) Emiliano Sanchez	3, 1, 2, F	6
3	(England) Josh Auty	0, 2', 2, 3	7+1
4	(Australia) Hugh Skidmore	3, 3, 1', 0	7+1
5	(England) Ricky Ashworth	3, 3, 2, 2', 0	15
6	(England) Simon Lambert	1, 2', 1', 1	5+2
7	(England) Ashley Birks	0, 1, 1', 1	3+1

1	(England) Joe Screen	EF, 1, 3, 1, 1'	6+1
2	(Netherlands) Theo Pijper	1, 0, 6^, 0	7
3	(Australia) Christian Henry	1', 1, 1', 3	6+2
4	(England) James Grieves	2, 0, 2, 6^	10
5	(Australia) Josh Grajczonek	2, 2, 3, 0, 2	9
6	(England) Nick Morris	3, R, Fx, R	3
7	(Poland) Michal Rajkowski	2', 0, 0, 2'	4+2

2 June 2011	Sheffield Tigers	–	Redcar Bears	Owlerton Stadium, Sheffield

9 June 2011	Sheffield Tigers	–	Plymouth Devils	Owlerton Stadium, Sheffield

16 June 2011	Sheffield Tigers	–	Newcastle Diamonds	Owlerton Stadium, Sheffield

23 June 2011	Sheffield Tigers	–	Leicester Lions	Owlerton Stadium, Sheffield

30 June 2011	Sheffield Tigers	–	Scunthorpe Scorpions	Owlerton Stadium, Sheffield

7 July 2011	Sheffield Tigers	–	Edinburgh Monarchs	Owlerton Stadium, Sheffield

14 July 2011	Sheffield Tigers	–	Workington Comets	Owlerton Stadium, Sheffield

28 July 2011	Sheffield Tigers	–	Rye House Rockets	Owlerton Stadium, Sheffield

==== Away Meetings ====
26 March 2011	Report	Rye House Rockets	46–44	Sheffield Tigers	Hoddesdon Stadium, Hoddesdon
2 League Points	1 League Point

9 April 2011	Report	Workington Comets	55–37	Sheffield Tigers	Derwent Park, Workington
3 League Points	0 League Points

22 April 2011	Report	Ipswich Witches	53–38	Sheffield Tigers	Foxhall Stadium, Ipswich
3 League Points	0 League Points

29 April 2011	Report	Plymouth Devils	44–45	Sheffield Tigers	St. Boniface Arena, Plymouth
0 League Points	3 League Points

1 May 2011	Report	Newcastle Diamonds	49–44	Sheffield Tigers	Brough Park Stadium, Newcastle
2 League Points	1 League Point

21 May 2011	Report	Newport Wasps	48–44	Sheffield Tigers	Hayley Stadium, Newport
2 League Points	1 League Point

31 May 2011	Report	Somerset Rebels	40–53	Sheffield Tigers	Oak Tree Arena, Somerset
0 League Points	4 League Points

3 June 2011	Redcar Bears	–	Sheffield Tigers	South Tees Motorsport Park, Redcar

4 June 2011	Berwick Bandits	–	Sheffield Tigers	Shielfield Park, Berwick-upon-Tweed

10 June 2011	Scunthorpe Scorpions	–	Sheffield Tigers	Eddie Wright Raceway, Scunthorpe

17 June 2011	Edinburgh Monarchs	–	Sheffield Tigers	Armadale Stadium, Edinburgh

16 July 2011	Leicester Lions	–	Sheffield Tigers	Beaumont Park, Leicester

TBA	Glasgow Tigers	P – P	Sheffield Tigers	Ashfield Stadium, Glasgow

=== Premier League Second Phase ===
The format and cut-off point for the split is made as each team reaches 10 home and 10 away matches. Group 1 will be teams placed 1st, 4th, 5th, 8th, 9th, 12th and 14th – Group 2 is 2nd, 3rd, 6th, 7th, 10th, 11th and 13th. Those additional 12 matches are then added onto the points gained from the 26 meetings in Round 1.

=== Premier League KOC ===
The Tigers were drawn against the Monarchs for the 1st round of the competition.

==== Round 1 ====
Leg 1–12 May 2011	Report	Sheffield Tigers	59–31	Edinburgh Monarchs	Owlerton Stadium, Sheffield

1	(England) Ricky Ashworth	3, 2', 2', 3, 3	13+2
2	(Australia) Hugh Skidmore	1, 3, 2, 3	9
3	(England) Josh Auty	3, 1, 3, 2'	9+1
4	(Argentina) Emiliano Sanchez	1, 0, 0, 3	4
5	(Australia) Shane Parker	3, 2', 3, 2', 2'	12+3
6	(England) Simon Lambert	2, 3, 1, 3, 2'	11+1
7	(England) Ashley Birks	1', 0, 0	1+1

1	(Germany) Kevin Wolbert	EF, 3, 0, 1	4
2	(Australia) Matthew Wethers	2, 2', 3, 2, 1	3+1
3	(England) Andrew Tully	2, 1, 1, 1	5
4	(Finland) Kalle Katajisto	0, 0, 0	0
5	(England) Craig Cook	1', 1, 1', 0	3+2
6	(England) Lee Dicken	EF, 0, 1	1
7	(England) Kyle Howarth	3, 2, 1, 2, 0, 0, 0	8

Leg 2–13 May 2011	Report	Edinburgh Monarchs	55–35	Sheffield Tigers	Armadale Stadium, Edinburgh

1	(Germany) Kevin Wolbert	3, 3, 3, 3, 3	15
2	(Australia) Matthew Wethers	2', 2', 3, 1	8+2
3	(England) Andrew Tully	3, 1, 2', 3	9+1
4	(Finland) Kalle Katajisto	0, 3, 3, 1	7
5	(England) Craig Cook	3, 2, 3, 2', 1	11+1
6	(England) Lee Dicken	1', 0, F	1+1
7	(England) Kyle Howarth	2, 2', Fx, F, 0	4+1

1	(England) Ricky Ashworth	R, 2, 2, F	4
2	(Australia) Hugh Skidmore	1, Fx, 1', 1', 0	3+2
3	(England) Josh Auty	1', 1, 0, 2	4+1
4	(Argentina) Emiliano Sanchez	Fx, Fx – Withdrawn	0
5	(Australia) Shane Parker	2, 3, 2, 3, 2	12
6	(England) Simon Lambert	3, 1, 2, 1, 1', 1, 2'	11+2
7	(England) Ashley Birks	Fx, 1, F	1

Sheffield Tigers qualified for Round 2 by defeating the Edinburgh Monarchs 94–86 on aggregate.

==== Round 2 ====
Leg 1–21 July 2011	Sheffield Tigers	–	Workington Comets	Owlerton Stadium, Sheffield

Leg 2–23 July 2011	Workington Comets	–	Sheffield Tigers	Derwent Park, Workington

=== Challenge Meetings ===
The first challenge of the season was an Inter-League meetings against local rivals Belle Vue Aces.

17 March 2011; 19:45	Sheffield Tigers	37–53	Belle Vue Aces	Owlerton Stadium, Sheffield
Josh Auty 11	Patrick Hougaard 12+2

18 March 2011; 19:30	Scunthorpe Scorpions	43–47	Sheffield Tigers	Eddie Wright Raceway, Scunthorpe
Tero Aarnio 12+1	Josh Auty 15+1

24 March 2011; 19:30	Sheffield Tigers	59–35	Scunthorpe Scorpions	Owlerton Stadium, Sheffield
Josh Auty 17+1	David Howe 11

== League table ==
Pos	Club	M	Home				Away					F	A	+/-	Pts
Pos	Club	M	3W	2W	D	L	4W	3W	D	1L	L	F	A	+/-	Pts
1	Workington Comets	11	6	0	0	0	2	1	0	0	2	551	464	+87	29
2	Somerset Rebels	12	4	1	0	1	3	1	0	0	2	591	518	+73	29
3	Ipswich Witches	15	7	1	0	1	1	0	1	0	4	726	645	+81	29
4	Glasgow Tigers	9	5	0	0	0	1	2	0	0	1	451	373	+78	25
5	Sheffield Tigers	12	4	0	0	1	1	1	0	3	2	563	538	+25	22
6	Rye House Rockets	15	4	1	0	2	1	0	0	2	5	664	698	-34	20
7	Edinburgh Monarchs	9	4	1	0	1	1	0	0	1	1	445	381	+64	19
8	Scunthorpe Scorpions	15	3	2	0	1	1	0	0	1	7	637	743	-106	18
9	Berwick Bandits	13	3	2	0	1	0	0	1	1	5	590	604	-14	16
10	Redcar Bears	10	1	1	1	1	1	1	0	1	3	447	463	-16	14
11	Newcastle Diamonds	10	2	1	0	2	0	1	0	1	3	447	468	-21	12
12	Leicester Lions	11	2	0	1	3	0	1	0	1	3	483	524	-41	11
13	Newport Wasps	12	0	1	0	5	1	0	0	0	5	500	600	-100	6
14	Plymouth Devils	6	1	0	0	2	0	0	0	0	3	236	312	-76	3

Home: 3W = Home win by 7 points or more; 2W = Home win by between 1 and 6 points
Away: 4W = Away win by 7 points or more; 3W = Away win by between 1 and 6 points; 1L = Away loss by 6 points or less
M = Meetings; D = Draws; L = Losses; F = Race points for; A = Race points against; +/- = Race points difference; Pts = Total Points

Last updated: 31 May 2011

Source: BSPA
