= SGB Championship 2018 =

British motorcycle speedway season

- League: SGB Championship
- Champions: Workington Comets
- Knockout Cup: Workington Comets
- Individual: Craig Cook
- Pairs: Sheffield Tigers
- Fours: Peterborough Panthers
- Championship Shield: Workington Comets
- Highest average: Craig Cook
- Division/s above: SGB Premiership
- Division/s below: National League

The SGB Championship 2018 was the 2018 season of the second division of Great British speedway. The season ran between March and October 2018 and consisted of 11 teams participating.

Workington Comets completed the treble winning the playoffs, Championship Shield and the Knockout Cup. It was the first league title win since their formation in 1970.

== League ==
Teams face each other two times: once home and once away.

=== Results ===
Home \ Away	BER	EDB	GLA	IPS	LAK	NEW	PET	RED	SCU	SHF	WRK
Berwick Bandits		51–39	58–32	50–40	49–41	57–32	55–35	51–38	54–36	53–37	43–47
Edinburgh Monarchs	42–48		56–33	51–39	57–33	46–44	48–42	69–21	65–25	54–36	65–25
Glasgow Tigers	49–41	56–34		47–42	51–38	58–32	47–43	54–36	54–36	53–37	50–40
Ipswich Witches	43–47	53–37	41–49		51–39	60–29	41–49	48–42	51–38	50–40	43–47
Lakeside Hammers	56–34	54–36	50–40	52–37		48–42	40–50	56–34	61–29	51–39	56–32
Newcastle Diamonds	47–43	53–37	35–54	45–45	53–37		47–43	64–26	42–48	54–36	49–41
Peterborough Panthers	47–43	48–42	49–41	45–45	52–38	49–41		51–39	48–42	49–41	33–57
Redcar Bears	50–40	33–57	48–42	41–49	37–53	52–38	42–48		52–38	47–42	45–44
Scunthorpe Scorpions	45–45	53–37	46–44	30–59	44–45	50–40	40–50	65–25		56–34	54–36
Sheffield Tigers	58–32	45–45	56–34	52–38	38–52	35–55	45–45	38–52	37–53		48–42
Workington Comets	59–31	48–42	48.5–41.5	50–40		63–27	52–38	47–43	52–38	51–39	

Legend: Blue = home team win; Yellow = draw; Red = away team win.

Teams face each other two times: once home and once away.

The following SGB Championship league match was not completed during the league season
Workington Comets Vs Lakeside Hammers

=== Table ===
Final SGB Championship League Table Up To And Including Sunday 16 September

Pos.	Club	M	Home			Away					F	A	Pts	+/−
Pos.	Club	M	W	D	L	4W	3W	D	1L	L	F	A	Pts	+/−
1	Peterborough Panthers	20	8	1	1	3	1	1	3	2	914	866	45	+48
2	Glasgow Tigers	20	10	0	0	2	0	0	2	6	929.5	866.5	40	+63
3	Workington Comets	19	9	0	0	1	2	0	2	5	877.5	829.5	39	+52
4	Lakeside Hammers	19	9	0	1	2	1	0	0	6	900	805	38	+95
5	Berwick Bandits	20	9	0	1	0	2	1	2	5	924	874	37	+50
6	Edinburgh Monarchs	20	9	0	1	1	0	1	2	6	960	839	35	+121
7	Ipswich Witches	20	6	0	4	2	0	2	1	5	915	880	31	+35
8	Newcastle Diamonds	20	7	1	2	1	0	0	2	7	869	926	28	-57
9	Scunthorpe Scorpions	20	6	1	3	1	1	0	1	7	854	941	27	-87
10	Redcar Bears	20	6	0	4	1	0	0	2	7	803	994	24	-191
11	Sheffield Tigers	20	4	2	4	0	0	0	3	7	847	952	17	-105

=== Play-offs ===
**Semi Finals**
Peterborough Panthers	**44**	34	78
**Lakeside Hammers**	46	**56**	102
Glasgow Tigers	**51**	38	89
**Workington Comets**	38	**52**	90

**Grand Final**
Lakeside Hammers	**44**	29	73
**Workington Comets**	34	**61**	95

Home team scores are in bold
Overall aggregate scores are in red

=== Semi-finals ===
7 October

Peterborough Panthers	44–46	Lakeside Hammers	East of England Showground; Referee(s): Peter Clarke

24 October

Lakeside Hammers	56–34	Peterborough Panthers	Rye House Stadium; Referee(s): David Watters

14 October at 1:30 pm

Glasgow Tigers	51–38	Workington Comets	Peugeot Ashfield; Referee(s): Jim McGregor

14 October at 7:30 pm

Workington Comets	52–38	Glasgow Tigers	Derwent Park; Referee(s): Margaret Vardy

=== Grand final ===
27 October

Lakeside Hammers; Nick Morris 12; Richard Lawson 10; Adam Ellis 9 Ben Morley 5 Zach Wajtknecht 4 Kyle Newman 2 Alfie Bowtell 2	44–34	Workington Comets; Mason Campton 9 Nikolai Klindt 8 Rasmus Jensen 6 Rene Bach 6 Tero Aarnio 5 Kyle Bickley 0 Dan Bewley R/R	Rye House Stadium; Referee(s): Margaret Vardy

28 October

Workington Comets; Nikolai Klindt 15; Rasmus Jensen 14; Tero Aarnio 11; Rene Bach 10; Kyle Bickley 6 Mason Campton 5 Ty Proctor R/R	61–29	Lakeside Hammers; Adam Ellis 9 Richard Lawson 8 Nick Morris 5 Kyle Newman 4 Zach Wajtknecht 2 Alfie Bowtell 1 Ben Morley 0	Derwent Park; Referee(s): Stuart Wilson

== SGB Championship Knockout Cup ==
The 2018 SGB Championship Knockout Cup was the 51st edition of the Knockout Cup for tier two teams.

=== KO Cup stages ===
**Preliminary Rounds**
**Sheffield Tigers**	**44**	50	94
Redcar Bears	28	**40**	68
Ipswich Witches	**35**	34	79
**Lakeside Hammers**	34	**49**	83
**Edinburgh Monarchs**	**46**	46	92
Glasgow Tigers	44	**43**	87

**Quarter Finals**
Sheffield Tigers	**51**	34	85
**Scunthorpe Scorpions**	39	**56**	95
Lakeside Hammers	38	**40**	78
**Peterborough Panthers**	**52**	38	90
**Edinburgh Monarchs**	**57**	42	99
Berwick Bandits	33	**48**	81
Newcastle Diamonds	**40**	29	69
**Workington Comets**	50	**61**	111

**Semi Finals**
**Scunthorpe Scorpions**	**59**	39	98
Peterborough Panthers	31	**51**	82
Edinburgh Monarchs	**59**	29	88
**Workington Comets**	31	**61**	92

**Final**
Scunthorpe Scorpions	**54**	28	82
**Workington Comets**	36	**62**	98

Home team scores are in bold
Overall aggregate scores are in red

First round

31 May

Sheffield Tigers	44–28	Redcar Bears	Owlerton Stadium; Referee(s): Phil Griffin

1 June

Redcar Bears	40–50	Sheffield Tigers	Media Prima Arena; Referee(s): Darren Hartley

3 May

Ipswich Witches	35–54	Lakeside Hammers	Foxhall Stadium; Referee(s): Mick Bates

4 May

Lakeside Hammers	49–41	Ipswich Witches	Arena-Essex Raceway; Referee(s): Paul Carrington

26 May

Edinburgh Monarchs	46–44	Glasgow Tigers	Lothian Arena; Referee(s): Michael Breckon

27 May

Glasgow Tigers	43–46	Edinburgh Monarchs	Peugeot Ashfield; Referee(s): Graham Flint

Quarter-finals

28 June

Sheffield Tigers	51–39	Scunthorpe Scorpions	Owlerton Stadium; Referee(s): Phil Griffin

29 June

Scunthorpe Scorpions	56–34	Sheffield Tigers	Eddie Wright Raceway; Referee(s): Mick Bates

23 September

Peterborough Panthers	52–38	Lakeside Hammers	East of England Showground; Referee(s): Mick Bates

30 September

Lakeside Hammers	40–38	Peterborough Panthers	Rye House Stadium; Referee(s): Darren Hartley

29 June

Edinburgh Monarchs	57–33	Berwick Bandits	Lothian Arena; Referee(s): Jim McGregor

30 June

Berwick Bandits	48–42	Edinburgh Monarchs	Shielfield Park; Referee(s): Michael Breckon

8 July

Newcastle Diamonds	40–50	Workington Comets	Newcastle Stadium; Referee(s): Stuart Wilson

21 September

Workington Comets	61–29	Newcastle Diamonds	Derwent Park; Referee(s): Michael Breckon

Semi-finals

5 October

Scunthorpe Scorpions	59–31	Peterborough Panthers	Eddie Wright Raceway; Referee(s): Mick Bates

13 October

Peterborough Panthers	51–39	Scunthorpe Scorpions	East of England Showground; Referee(s): Dave Watters

28 September

Edinburgh Monarchs	59–31	Workington Comets	Lothian Arena; Referee(s): Ronnie Allan

29 September

Workington Comets	61–29	Edinburgh Monarchs	Derwent Park; Referee(s): Stuart Wilson

=== Final ===
First leg

21 October

Scunthorpe Scorpions; Steve Worrall 12; Jason Garrity 11; Ricky Wells 9 Jake Allen 9 Stefan Nielsen 7 Gino Manzares 6 Danny Phillips 0	54–36	Workington Comets; Rasmus Jensen 15; Mason Campton 8 Rene Bach 5 Paul Starke 3 Nikolai Klindt 4 Kyle Bickley 1 Ty Proctor R/R	Eddie Wright Raceway; Referee(s): Stuart Wilson

Second leg

25 October

Workington Comets; Rasmus Jensen 16; Rene Bach 15; Nikolai Klindt 14; Mason Campton 11; Claus Vissing 5 Kyle Bickley 1 Ty Proctor R/R	62–28	Scunthorpe Scorpions; Jake Allen 10; Stefan Nielsen 6 Steve Worrall 5 Thomas Jørgensen 3 Jason Garrity 2 Gino Manzares 2 Danny Phillips 0	Derwent Park; Referee(s): Chris Durno

Workington were declared Knockout Cup Champions, winning on aggregate 98–82.

== Championship Shield ==
Borders Group

Home \ Away	BER	EDB	GLA	WRK
Berwick Bandits		53–37	47–43	45–45
Edinburgh Monarchs	51–39		41–48	44–46
Glasgow	54–36	49–41		33–56
Workington Comets	45–45	47–43	45–45	

Legend: Blue = home team win; Yellow = draw; Red = away team win.

Final Championship Shield Borders Group Table

Pos.	Club	M	Home			Away					F	A	Pts	+/−
Pos.	Club	M	W	D	L	4W	3W	D	1L	L	F	A	Pts	+/−
1	Workington Comets	6	1	2	0	1	1	1	0	0	284	255	**14**	+29
2	Glasgow Tigers	6	2	0	1	1	0	1	1	0	272	266	**13**	+6
3	Berwick Bandits	6	2	1	0	0	0	1	0	2	265	275	**9**	-10
4	Edinburgh Monarchs	6	1	0	2	0	0	0	1	2	257	282	**4**	-27

Northern Group

Home \ Away	NEW	RED	SCU	SHF
Newcastle Diamonds		51–39	46–44	53–37
Redcar Bears	58–32		36–54	39–51
Scunthorpe Scorpions	50–40	58–32		49–31
Sheffield Tigers	59–31	49–40	52–38	

Legend: Blue = home team win; Yellow = draw; Red = away team win.

Final Championship Shield Northern Group Table

Pos.	Club	M	Home			Away					F	A	Pts	+/−
Pos.	Club	M	W	D	L	4W	3W	D	1L	L	F	A	Pts	+/−
1	Scunthorpe Scorpions	6	3	0	0	1	0	0	1	1	293	247	**14**	+46
2	Sheffield Tigers	6	3	0	0	1	0	0	0	2	289	250	**13**	+39
3	Newcastle Diamonds	6	3	0	0	0	0	0	0	3	253	287	**9**	-34
4	Redcar Bears	6	1	0	2	0	0	0	0	3	244	295	**3**	-51

Southern Group

Home \ Away	IPS	LAK	PET
Ipswich Witches		44–45	44–46
Lakeside Hammers	54–35		50–40
Peterborough Panthers	46–44	53–37	

Legend: Blue = home team win; Yellow = draw; Red = away team win.

Final Championship Shield Southern Group Table

Pos.	Club	M	Home			Away					F	A	Pts	+/−
Pos.	Club	M	W	D	L	4W	3W	D	1L	L	F	A	Pts	+/−
1	lakeside Hammers	4	2	0	0	0	1	0	1	0	193	165	**10**	+28
2	Peterborough Panthers	4	2	0	0	0	1	0	0	1	185	175	**9**	+10
3	Ipswich Witches	4	0	0	2	0	0	0	0	2	160	198	**0**	-38

Play-offs

**Semi Finals**
Scunthorpe Scorpions	**45**	35	80
**Workington Comets**	45	**54**	96
**Lakeside Hammers**	**50**	44	94
Peterborough Panthers	40	**46**	86

**Grand Final**
**Workington Comets**	46	**52**	98
Lakeside Hammers	**44**	38	82

Home team scores are in bold
Overall aggregate scores are in red

Semi-finals

7 September

Scunthorpe Scorpions	45–45	Workington Comets	Eddie Wright Raceway; Referee(s): Chris Durno

22 September

Workington Comets	54–35	Scunthorpe Scorpions	Derwent Park; Referee(s): Peter Clarke

29 September

Lakeside Hammers	50–40	Peterborough Panthers	Rye House Stadium; Referee(s): Darren Hartley

30 September

Peterborough Panthers	46–44	Lakeside Hammers	East of England Showground; Referee(s): Graham Reeve

Final

19 October

Lakeside Hammers	44–46	Workington Comets	Rye House Stadium; Referee(s): Chris Gay

29 October

Workington Comets	52–38	Lakeside Hammers	Derwent Park; Referee(s): Jim McGregor

== Riders' Championship ==
Craig Cook won the Riders' Championship for the second time. The final was held on 2 September at Owlerton Stadium.

Pos.	Rider	Pts	Total	SF	Final
1	(England) Craig Cook	1 3 3 R 3	10	3	3
2	(England) Richard Lawson	3 3 0 3 2	11	-	2
3	(England) Kyle Howarth	3 3 1 3 1	11	-	1
4	(Germany) Erik Riss	3 1 3 1 3	11	2	0
5	(England) Charles Wright	3 3 2 0 1	9	1	
6	(Australia) Ty Proctor	2 1 3 FX 3	9	0	
7	(Finland) Tero Aarnio	0 2 2 3 2	9		
8	(Australia) Aaron Summers	2 2 0 3 1	8		
9	(England) Ben Barker	1 0 3 2 2	8		
10	(England) Steve Worrall	1 EX 2 1 3	7		
11	(England) Scott Nicholls	0 2 2 2 0	6		
12	(United States) Ricky Wells	1 EX 1 2 2	6		
13	(Denmark) Michael Palm Toft	2 1 0 1 1	5		
14	(England) Josh Auty	2 1 F -	5		
15	(Australia) Kevin Doolan	0 0 1 2 0	3		
16	(Argentina) Nico Covatti	0 0 0 1 0	1		
16	(England) Kyle Bickley (res)	1	1		

- f=fell, r-retired, ex=excluded, ef=engine failure t=touched tapes

== Pairs ==
The SGB Championship Pairs was held at Oaktree Arena on 20 July. The event was won by Sheffield Tigers for the second consecutive year.

Group A
Pos	Team	Pts	Riders
1	Peterborough	21	Palm Toft 15, Nicholls 6
2	Lakeside	21	Lawson 13, Morris 8
3	Edinburgh	20	Wells 12, Riss 8
4	Berwick	14	Summers 9, Doolan 5
5	Scunthorpe	14	Allen 9, Auty 5

Group B
Pos	Team	Pts	Riders
1	Sheffield	22	Wright C 12, Howarth 10
2	Workington	20	Klindt 12, Proctor 8
3	Redcar	20	Barker 10, Jorgensen 10
4	Ipswich	19	Schlein 15, Covatti 4
5	Glasgow	9	Harris 5, Starke 4

Semi finals

- Sheffield bt Lakeside 7–2
- Workington bt Peterborough 7–2

Final

- Sheffield bt Workington 5–4

== Fours ==
Peterborough Panthers won the SGB Championship Fours for the second successive year, held on 1 July 2018, at the Media Prime Arena.

Qualifying
Pos	Team	Pts	Riders
1	Peterborough	18	Palm Toft 6, Wilson-Dean 6, Nicholls 3, Ostergaard 3,
2	Edinburgh	17	Riss E 6, Andersson 4, Riss M 4, Pickering 2, Ruml 1
3	Lakeside	13	Morris 6, Ellis 5, Lawson 1, Bowtell 1
4	Glasgow	13	Harris 4, Kerr 4, Vissing 3, Worrall 2
5	Sheffield	13	Kurtz 5, Bjerre 5, Wright 3, Nicol 0
6	Workington	11	Bewley 4, Proctor 4, Jensen 3, Campton 0

Qualifying (cont)
Pos	Team	Pts	Riders
7	Berwick	11	Summers 5, Etheridge 3, Jakobsen 1, Howe 1, Doolan 1
8	Ipswich	10	Covatti 6, Schlein 3, Heeps 1, Hume 0
9	Redcar	10	Andersen M 3, Jorgensen 3, Andersen J 2, Barker 2
10	Newcastle	9	Aarnio 3, Robson 2, Morris 2, Kus 2
11	Scunthorpe	7	Auty 4, Manzares 1, Allen 1, Garcia 1

Final
Pos	Team	Pts	Riders
1	Peterborough	22	Palm Toft 7, Nicholls 6, Ostergaard 5, Wilson-Dean 4
2	Edinburgh	19	Riss E 9, Pickering 4, Andersson 4, Riss M 1, Ruml 1
3	Glasgow	17	Harris 6, Kerr 5, Vissing 4, Worrall 3
4	Lakeside	14	Morris 9, Ellis 4, Lawson 1, Bowtell 0

== Final leading averages ==
Rider	Team	Average
(England) Craig Cook	Glasgow	11.05
(United States) Ricky Wells	Edinburgh	9.54
(Australia) Nick Morris	Lakeside	9.46
(England) Richard Lawson	Lakeside	9.41
(England) Danny King	Ipswich	9.25
(England) Josh Auty	Scunthorpe	9.08
(Australia) Rory Schlein	Ipswich	9.01
(Germany) Erik Riss	Edinburgh	8.86
(England) Charles Wright	Sheffield	8.76
(England) Scott Nicholls	Peterborough	8.70

== Teams and final averages ==
Berwick Bandits

- (Australia) Aaron Summers 7.39
- (Australia) Kevin Doolan 7.63
- (Denmark) Nikolaj Busk Jakobsen 7.41
- (Australia) Jye Etheridge 6.95
- (England) David Howe 6.48
- (Netherlands) Theo Pijper 6.23
- (Austria) Dany Gappmaier 6.15
- (Sweden) John Lindman 4.00

Edinburgh Monarchs

- (United States) Ricky Wells 9.54
- (Germany) Erik Riss 8.86
- (England) Richie Worrall 8.63
- (Sweden) Victor Palovaara 7.13
- (Australia) Josh Pickering 6.98
- (Sweden) Joel Andersson 5.89
- (Germany) Mark Riss 5.55
- (England) Matt Williamson 4.00
- (England) Max Clegg 3.64
- (Scotland) William Lawson 3.63
- (United States) Max Ruml 3.42
- (Argentina) Coty Garcia 2.60

Glasgow Tigers

- (England) Craig Cook 11.05
- (England) Chris Harris 8.53
- (England) Richie Worrall 8.11
- (England) Lewis Kerr 8.07
- (Denmark) Claus Vissing 7.81
- (England) Paul Starke 6.92
- (England) James Sarjeant 4.74
- (England) Nathan Greaves 3.24
- (England) Jack Thomas 2.58

Ipswich Witches

- (England) Danny King 9.25
- (Australia) Rory Schlein 9.01
- (Australia) Cameron Heeps 7.16
- (Argentina) Nico Covatti 7.10
- (Germany) Mark Riss 5.85
- (England) Drew Kemp 5.42
- (Germany) Michael Hartel 5.00
- (Argentina) Coty Garcia 4.90
- (Denmark) Jonas Jeppesen 4.00
- (England) Connor Mountain 3.72
- (England) Danyon Hume 3.62
- (England) David Wallinger 0.80

Lakeside Hammers

- (Australia) Nick Morris 9.46
- (England) Richard Lawson 9.41
- (England) Adam Ellis 8.11
- (England) Kyle Newman 7.02
- (England) Zach Wajtknecht 5.97
- (England) Ben Morley 5.58
- (England) Alfie Bowtell 3.14

Newcastle Diamonds

- (Finland) Tero Aarnio 7.22
- (England) Stuart Robson 7.05
- (Sweden) Ludvig Lindgren 6.77
- (Australia) Matthew Wethers 6.51
- (England) Ashley Morris 6.39
- (Czech Republic) Matěj Kůs 5.96
- (England) Lewis Rose 5.33
- (England) Carl Wilkinson 4.95

Peterborough Panthers

- (England) Scott Nicholls 8.70
- (Denmark) Michael Palm Toft 8.66
- (New Zealand) Bradley Wilson-Dean 7.07
- (Denmark) Ulrich Ostergaard 6.93
- (Denmark) Emil Grondal 5.80
- (Finland) Nike Lunna 5.76
- (England) Tom Bacon 5.41
- (England) Simon Lambert 5.16
- (England) Ellis Perks 3.33

Redcar Bears

- (England) Ben Barker 7.85
- (Denmark) Thomas Jørgensen 7.72
- (Finland) Nike Lunna 6.67
- (Denmark) Jonas B. Andersen 6.39
- (France) Dimitri Bergé 5.50
- (Germany) Tobias Busch 5.42
- (Czech Republic) Matěj Kůs 5.19
- (Netherlands) Theo Pijper 5.00
- (Denmark) Mikkel B Andersen 4.87
- (Australia) Jordan Stewart 4.18
- (England) Nathan Greaves 4.00

Scunthorpe Scorpions

- (England) Josh Auty 9.08
- (England) Jason Garrity 8.32
- (Australia) Jake Allen 7.94
- (England) Steve Worrall 7.62
- (Denmark) Stefan Nielsen 6.52
- (United States) Gino Manzares 4.29
- (England) Danny Phillips 1.53

Sheffield Tigers

- (England) Charles Wright 8.76
- (England) Kyle Howarth 8.00
- (Denmark) Lasse Bjerre 7.69
- (Denmark) Kasper Andersen 6.77
- (Australia) Todd Kurtz 6.75
- (England) James Shanes 5.81
- (United States) Broc Nicol 4.00
- (England) Connor Mountain 3.89
- (England) Jack Smith 3.81
- (Denmark) Jan Graversen 3.00
- (England) Georgie Wood 2.80
- (England) Joe Lawlor 0.89

Workington Comets

- (Australia) Ty Proctor 7.91
- (England) Dan Bewley 7.78
- (New Zealand) Bradley Wilson-Dean 7.76
- (Denmark) Nicolai Klindt 7.66
- (Denmark) Rene Bach 7.63
- (Denmark) Rasmus Jensen 7.33
- (Australia) Mason Campton 7.23
- (England) Kyle Bickley 1.69

== See also ==
- The top division of British speedway SGB Premiership 2018
- List of United Kingdom speedway league champions
- Knockout Cup (speedway)
