= Scottish Open (speedway) =

Motorcycle championship

- Sport: Speedway
- Founded: 1928
- Country: Scotland

The Scottish Open Championship is a motorcycle speedway championship held annually in Scotland.

== History ==
The Championship has been run almost every year since 1928. That inaugural year saw two events, one for 350 cc bikes and another for 500 cc bikes. From 1929 the event was only open to those riding the 500 cc bikes.

Run as the Scottish Championship from 1928-1945, it became the Scottish Riders Championship from 1949-1954 before a third and final name change in 1960 to the Scottish Open Championship.

Since 1988, the winner of the Scottish Open has been presented with the Jack Young Memorial Trophy in honour of the three time winner and former Edinburgh Monarchs rider from Australia who won the Speedway World Championship in 1951 and 1952. Young won the World Championship in 1951 while riding for the Monarchs, thus becoming the first second division rider to win the World crown. Young died from Emphysema in his home town of Adelaide, South Australia on 28 August 1987.

== Winners (since 1928) ==
Year	City	Venue	Winners
1928	Edinburgh	Marine Gardens	(Scotland) Drew McQueen (350 cc) (Scotland) Jimmy Valentine (500 cc)
1929	Edinburgh	Marine Gardens	(Scotland) Drew McQueen
1930	Edinburgh	Marine Gardens	(England) Harry Whitfield
1931-1937	Not held		
1938	Edinburgh	Marine Gardens	(Australia) Bluey Wilkinson
1939	Edinburgh	Marine Gardens	(United States) Wilbur Lamoreaux
1940-1944	Not held due to (World War II restrictions)		
1945	Glasgow	White City Stadium	(Australia) Ron Johnson
1946-1948	Not held		
1949	Edinburgh	Old Meadowbank	(Australia) Jack Young
1950	Edinburgh	Old Meadowbank	(Australia) Jack Young
1951	Edinburgh	Old Meadowbank	(Australia) Jack Young
1952	Edinburgh	Old Meadowbank	(New Zealand) Dick Campbell
1953	Edinburgh	Old Meadowbank	(Scotland) Tommy Miller
1954	Edinburgh	Old Meadowbank	(Scotland) Tommy Miller
1955-1959	Not held		
1960	Edinburgh	Old Meadowbank	(Scotland) Douglas Templeton
1961	Edinburgh	Old Meadowbank	(New Zealand) Trevor Redmond
1962	Edinburgh	Old Meadowbank	(Scotland) Douglas Templeton
1963	Edinburgh	Old Meadowbank	(England) Maurice Mattingley
1964	Edinburgh	Old Meadowbank	(Scotland) George Hunter
1965	Edinburgh	Old Meadowbank	(Denmark) Arne Pander
1966	Edinburgh	Old Meadowbank	(Scotland) Bill Landels
1967	Edinburgh	Old Meadowbank	(New Zealand) Barry Briggs
1968	Coatbridge	Cliftonhill	(England) Martin Ashby
1969	Coatbridge	Cliftonhill	(Norway) Reidar Eide
1970	Glasgow	Hampden Park	(New Zealand) Ivan Mauger
1971	Glasgow	Hampden Park	(New Zealand) Ivan Mauger
1972	Glasgow	Hampden Park	(New Zealand) Ivan Mauger
1973	Coatbridge	Cliftonhill	(New Zealand) Ivan Mauger
1974	Not held		
1975	Coatbridge	Cliftonhill	(Scotland) Brian Collins
1976	Coatbridge	Cliftonhill	(England) Peter Collins
1977	Blantyre	Saracen Park	(Scotland) Bert Harkins
1978-1980	Not held		
1981	Edinburgh	Powderhall Stadium	(New Zealand) Wayne Brown
1982	Not held		
1983	Glasgow	Craighead Park	(England) Steve Lawson
1984	Edinburgh	Powderhall Stadium	(New Zealand) Mitch Shirra
1985	Edinburgh	Powderhall Stadium	(England) Jamie Luckhurst
1986	Edinburgh	Powderhall Stadium	(England) Les Collins
1987	Edinburgh	Powderhall Stadium	(England) Neville Tatum
1988	Edinburgh	Powderhall Stadium	(England) Steve Lawson
1989	Edinburgh	Powderhall Stadium	(Australia) Todd Wiltshire
1990	Not held		
1991	Edinburgh	Powderhall Stadium	(United States) Greg Hancock
1992	Edinburgh	Powderhall Stadium	(United States) Greg Hancock
1993	Edinburgh	Powderhall Stadium	(England) Michael Coles
1994	Edinburgh	Powderhall Stadium	(England) Ben Howe
1995	Edinburgh	Powderhall Stadium	(United States) Bobby Ott
1996	Glasgow	Shawfield Stadium	(Australia) Shane Parker
1997	Armadale	Armadale Stadium	(England) Peter Carr
1998	Armadale	Armadale Stadium	(Denmark) Frede Schott
1999	Armadale	Armadale Stadium	(England) Peter Carr
2000	Armadale	Armadale Stadium	(England) Peter Carr
2001	Armadale	Armadale Stadium	(England) Andre Compton
2002	Armadale	Armadale Stadium	(England) Peter Carr
2003	Armadale	Armadale Stadium	(United States) Sam Ermolenko
2004	Armadale	Armadale Stadium	(Australia) Rory Schlein
2005	Armadale	Armadale Stadium	(England) David Howe
2006	Armadale	Armadale Stadium	(Poland) Stanisław Burza
2007	Not held		
2008	Armadale	Armadale Stadium	(Australia) Rory Schlein
2009	Armadale	Armadale Stadium	(England) James Wright
2010	Armadale	Armadale Stadium	(Czech Republic) Josef Franc
2011	Armadale	Armadale Stadium	(Australia) Rory Schlein
2012	Armadale	Armadale Stadium	(England) Andrew Tully
2013	Armadale	Armadale Stadium	(England) Craig Cook
2014	Armadale	Armadale Stadium	(Australia) Sam Masters
2015-2016	Not held		
2017	Armadale	Armadale Stadium	(Australia) Justin Sedgmen
2018	Armadale	Armadale Stadium	(Australia) Rory Schlein
2019	Armadale	Armadale Stadium	(England) Richie Worrall
2020-2021	Not held due to the COVID-19 pandemic.		
2022	Armadale	Armadale Stadium	(Australia) Sam Masters
