= 2011 Premier League Knock-Out Cup =

The 2011 Premier League Knock-Out Cup was the 44th edition of the Knockout Cup for tier two teams in British speedway.

== Summary ==
It was contested throughout the 2011 Premier League Season. The Reigning champions from 2010, the Newcastle Diamonds were narrowly eliminated by the Glasgow Tigers in the semi-final stages. However the competition was won by the Newport Wasps who defeated the league champions Glasgow Tigers, 106–74 on aggregate.

== Knock-Out Stages ==
Round 1
Berwick Bandits	BYE
-	-
Leicester Lions	86
Glasgow Tigers	94
Somerset Rebels	97
Plymouth Devils	83
Rye House Rockets	77
Newcastle Diamonds	89
Sheffield Tigers	94
Edinburgh Monarchs	86
Redcar Bears	79
Workington Comets	101
Scunthorpe Scorpions	90
Ipswich Witches	90
-	-
Newport Wasps	BYE

Quarter-finals
Berwick Bandits	83
Glasgow Tigers	96
Somerset Rebels	83
Newcastle Diamonds	97
Sheffield Tigers	89
Workington Comets	91
Ipswich Witches	74
Newport Wasps	106

Semi-finals
Glasgow Tigers	93
Newcastle Diamonds	87
Workington Comets	77
Newport Wasps	103

Final
Glasgow Tigers	74
Newport Wasps	106

== Round 1 ==
The draw for the 2011 Premier League KOC was taking at the 2010 AGM. 12 teams were drawn against each other, with 2 teams receiving 'byes' into the Quarter Finals. These two teams that received a bye were the Berwick Bandits and the Newport Wasps. The Kings Lynn Stars were originally going to face the Somerset Rebels, however due to their election to compete in the Elite League, the new premier league side, the Plymouth Devils would now face the Rebels. As Scunthorpe and Ipswich tied 90–90 on aggregate, their matches were replayed.

Aggregate Scores

Leicester Lions	86 - 94	Glasgow Tigers

Redcar Bears	79 - 101	Workington Comets

Rye House Rockets	77 - 89	Newcastle Diamonds

Sheffield Tigers	94 - 86	Edinburgh Monarchs

Somerset Rebels	97 - 83	Plymouth Devils

Scunthorpe Scorpions	90 - 90 78 - 102	Ipswich Witches (Replay)

First leg

12 May
19.30

Redcar Bears	44-46	Workington Comets
(Australia) Aaron Summers 12+1		(Czech Republic) Tomáš Topinka 11+1

12 May
19.45

Ipswich Witches	55-35	Scunthorpe Scorpions
(Australia) Kevin Doolan 15+2		(England) David Howe 7+1

12 May
19.45

Sheffield Tigers	59-31	Edinburgh Monarchs
(England) Ricky Ashworth 13+2		(Australia) Matthew Wethers 10+1

13 May
19.30

Somerset Rebels	54-36	Plymouth Devils
(Australia) Jason Doyle / Sam Masters 13+1		(England) Ben Barker 12

14 May
19.30

Leicester Lions	49-41	Glasgow Tigers
(Russia) Sergey Darkin 12		(Australia) Nick Morris 12+3

14 May
19.00

Rye House Rockets	39-39	Newcastle Diamonds
(England) Chris Neath 8		(England) Stuart Robson 11

Second leg

13 May
19.30

Edinburgh Monarchs	55-35	Sheffield Tigers
(Germany) Kevin Wölbert 15		(England) Simon Lambert 11+2

14 May
19.00

Workington Comets	55-35	Redcar Bears
(England) James Wright 13		(Australia) Jason Lyons 12

14 May
19.30

Plymouth Devils	47-43	Somerset Rebels
(England) Ben Barker 13		(Australia) Sam Masters 13+2

15 May
16.30

Glasgow Tigers	55-35	Leicester Lions
(Australia) Nick Morris 14+2		(Australia) Richard Sweetman 13

15 May
18.30

Newcastle Diamonds	47-43	Rye House Rockets
(England) Stuart Robson 10+3		(England) Chris Neath 9+1

3 June
19.30

Scunthorpe Scorpions	55-35	Ipswich Witches
(England) David Howe 13		(Denmark) Lasse Bjerre 9+1

Replay

Ipswich Witches	65 - 25	Scunthorpe Scorpions

Scunthorpe Scorpions	53 - 37	Ipswich Witches

== Quarter finals ==
Aggregate Scores

Ipswich Witches	78 - 102	Newport Wasps

Sheffield Tigers	89 - 91	Workington Comets

Somerset Rebels	83 - 97	Newcastle Diamonds

Berwick Bandits	83 - 96	Glasgow Tigers

First leg

Ipswich Witches	42 - 48	Newport Wasps

Sheffield Tigers	50 - 40	Workington Comets

Somerset Rebels	46 - 44	Newcastle Diamonds

Berwick Bandits	49 - 41	Glasgow Tigers

Second leg

Newport Wasps	58 - 32	Ipswich Witches

Workington Comets	51 - 39	Sheffield Tigers

Newcastle Diamonds	53 - 37	Somerset Rebels

Glasgow Tigers	55 - 34	Berwick Bandits

== Semi finals ==
Aggregate Scores

Newcastle Diamonds	87 - 93	Glasgow Tigers

Newport Wasps	103 - 77	Workington Comets

First leg

Glasgow Tigers	50 - 40	Newcastle Diamonds

Newport Wasps	59 - 31	Workington Comets

Second leg

Newcastle Diamonds	47 - 43	Glasgow Tigers

Workington Comets	46 - 44	Newport Wasps

== Final ==
First leg

1 October 2011

Newport Wasps Jason Doyle 13 Charlie Gjedde 12 Leigh Lanham 11 Anders Mellgren 9 Todd Kurtz 8 Robin Aspegren 6 Mark Jones 6	65 - 25	Glasgow Tigers Nick Morris 13 James Grieves 5 Joe Screen 3 Richard Sweetman 2 Theo Pijper 1 David Bellego 1 Michael Rajkowski 0

Hayley Stadium

Second leg

2 October 2021

Glasgow Tigers Joe Screen 12 Richard Sweetman 11 James Grieves 9 Theo Pijper 8 Nick Morris 4 David Bellego 3 Michael Rajkowski 2	49 - 41	Newport Wasps Jason Doyle 10 Leigh Lanham 9 Charlie Gjedde 7 Anders Mellgren 7 Todd Kurtz 3 Mark Jones 3 Robin Aspegren 2

Ashfield Stadium

Newport were declared Knockout Cup Champions, winning on aggregate 106–74.

== See also ==
- Speedway in the United Kingdom
- Knockout Cup (speedway)
