= 2011 Premier League speedway season =

British motorcycle speedway season

- League: Premier League
- Champions: Glasgow Tigers
- Knockout Cup: Newport Wasps
- Premier Shield: Newcastle Diamonds
- Individual: Sam Masters
- Pairs: Glasgow Tigers
- Fours: Ipswich Witches
- Highest average: Ben Barker
- Division/s above: 2011 Elite League
- Division/s below: 2011 National League

The 2011 Premier League season was the second division of British speedway. Glasgow Tigers won the league after winning both matches of a double-header on 9 October.

== Preseason ==
=== New entries ===
The Leicester Lions were hoping to gain entry to the 2010 season. However, the track was not ready in time for them to compete. They therefore decided to return in 2011. With the stadium getting approval, the Lions were then confirmed as entrants for the 2011 season.

On 15 November 2011, Plymouth Devils boss Mike Bowden confirmed that the Devils hope to join the 2011 Premier League after spending 5 years in the National League. On 19 November, it was confirmed that the Stoke Potters were to withdraw from the 2011 Premier League season due to financial climate and making substantial losses over the last three season. However, it was confirmed that they would race in the 2011 National League. It was also decided at the Yearly AGM meeting that the Birmingham Brummies and the Ipswich Witches would exchange league memberships, meaning the Brummies would move up to the Elite League and the Witches would move down to the Premier League. On 27 November, the BSPA announced that the Coventry Bees and the Peterborough Panthers failed to declare their intention to race in the forthcoming Elite League season and are therefore seeking a league to compete in. Because of this, the Kings Lynn Stars elected to compete in the 2011 Elite League and therefore withdrew from the Premier League. Later that day, the Plymouth Devils announced that they were set to be accepted into the 2011 Premier League season

=== Season format ===
At the annual AGM meeting, it was decided that the Premier League would be expanded to 19 home and 19 away fixtures throughout the season. The 14 teams will initially race each other in Round 1 with a total of 26 meetings (13 home and 13 away). In Round 2 the league then split into two groups of seven teams, with everyone then racing each other in their group for a further 12 meetings (6 home and 6 away). The format and cut-off point for the split is made as each team reaches 10 home and 10 away matches. Group 1 will be teams placed 1st, 4th, 5th, 8th, 9th, 12th and 14th - Group 2 is 2nd, 3rd, 6th, 7th, 10th, 11th and 13th. Those additional 12 matches are then added onto the points gained from the 26 meetings in Round 1. The league table above at the end of the season will then show a total of 38 meetings (19 home and 19 away). The team that finishes top after these 38 meetings is declared Premier League Champions.

The Premier League KOC has been retained for the 2011 season. A new competition, the Premier Shield has been introduced for the 2011 season. It is understood that it will work along the same lines as the Elite Shield, and contested by the previous seasons league winners and KOC champions. The 2011 Premier Shield will be contested between the Edinburgh Monarchs and the Newcastle Diamonds.

The Premier Trophy and the Young Shield do not continue into the 2011 season. It has yet to be confirmed if anything will replace these competitions.

== Fixtures & results ==
=== Phase 1 ===
Phase 1 of the 2011 Premier League consists of each team racing each other, both at their home track and the oppositions away track. This would consist of 26 meetings for each team.

Home\Away	BER	EDI	GLA	IPS	LEI	ND	NW	PLY	RED	RH	SS	SHE	SOM	WOR
Berwick Bandits		53-39	44-46	62-28	46-44	49-43	48-42	59-34	48-44	40-38	54-36	51-42	48-44	40-34
Edinburgh Monarchs	49-44		42-48	53-40	44-45	53-39	51-42	64-28	56-37	55-37	60-32	49-41	53-41	48-41
Glasgow Tigers	50-39	58-32		53-37	60-32	50-43	53-37	62-31	61-32	54-36	50-43	54-40	56-39	60-33
Ipswich Witches	53-42	51-41	42-48		58-35	47-44	49-41	59-35	49-43	49-47	69-24	53-38	42-51	63-27
Leicester Lions	45-45	44-49	28-62	42-42		52-43	45-45	44-45	41-52	56-35	40-52	45-48	40-50	45-45
Newcastle Diamonds	48-41	52-43	41-49	54-39	50-40		41-49	52-40	42-47	50-43	49-45	49-44	48-45	54-39
Newport Wasps	57-38	42-49	57-37	42-50	52-40	48-42		68-22	55-38	37-53	43-49	48-44	43-50	43-50
Plymouth Devils	36-57	50-43	39-45	43-47	48-36	47-41	40-53		47-43	39-51	51-38	44-45	45-45	41-49
Redcar Bears	46-43	54-41	44-46	45-45	53-37	59-34	50-40	62-30		45-45	48-45	48-43	49-41	46-44
Rye House Rockets	54-39	48-42	47-46	45-34	54-39	43-44	41-49	54-41	53-36		47-43	46-44	54-39	51-41
Scunthorpe Scorpions	56-39	46-44	54-36	53-39	53-40	47-42	52-41	56-37	52-41	56-38		46-43	49-41	44-46
Sheffield Tigers	51-41	56-40	52-44	56-36	61-33	52-39	56-35	62-30	57-37	64-29	55-39		43-47	57-36
Somerset Rebels	59-31	57-38	62-31	59-34	53-41	53-43	48-44	48-42	45-45	46-44	62-32	40-53		47-43
Workington Comets	57-36	55-39	53-42	51-39	59-31	51-42	57-38	48-23	50-40	60-34	59-37	55-37	53-41	

Last updated: August 2, 2011. Source: BSPA

Colours: Green = home win; Red = away win; White = draw

Home team listed in the left-hand column

=== Phase 2 ===
Home\Away	BER	IPS	ND	PLY	RH	SHE	WOR
Berwick Bandits		40-50	54-40	52-20	43-41	47-41	52-41
Ipswich Witches	58-36		50-43	58-35	55-37	50-40	56-37
Newcastle Diamonds	47-43	46-47		56-39	45-44	51-39	44-46
Plymouth Devils	49-41	48-42	50-45		46-44	46-44	47-42
Rye House Rockets	49-43	40-50	51-38	56-35		47-44	54-39
Sheffield Tigers	52-38	52-37	63-29	58-38	69-21		46-44
Workington Comets	47-46	45-45	53-40	60-35	55-36	42-48	

Home\Away	EDI	GLA	LEI	NW	RED	SS	SOM
Edinburgh Monarchs		39-54	51-42	44-45	61-33	64-25	46-46
Glasgow Tigers	55-39		53-42	60-33	62-30	66-27	62-28
Leicester Lions	53-40	43-49		36-57	46-44	43-47	49-41
Newport Wasps	51-42	52-41	57-34		54-40	56-39	56-37
Redcar Bears	54-39	48-42	50-45	42-51		54-39	48-46
Scunthorpe Scorpions	50-41	57-38	43-50	46-44	65-25		49-41
Somerset Rebels	48-41	51-42	51-43	43-47	51-42	50-43	

== Final League table ==
Pos	Club	M	Home				Away					F	A	Pts
Pos	Club	M	3W	2W	D	L	4W	3W	D	1L	L	F	A	Pts
1	Glasgow Tigers	38	19	0	0	0	3	6	0	2	8	1925	1568	89
2	Sheffield Tigers	38	17	1	0	1	1	3	0	8	7	1880	1604	74
3	Ipswich Witches	38	15	2	0	2	3	2	3	1	10	1793	1670	74
4	Workington Comets	38	16	1	1	1	2	2	1	5	9	1787	1667	72
5	Newport Wasps	38	11	2	0	6	5	2	1	3	8	1794	1697	68
6	Somerset Rebels	38	12	4	1	2	3	1	2	3	10	1786	1712	67
7	Scunthorpe Scorpions	38	13	4	0	2	1	2	0	3	13	1709	1786	60
8	Rye House Rockets	38	10	6	0	3	2	0	1	6	10	1687	1750	58
9	Berwick Bandits	38	8	9	0	2	1	0	1	5	12	1712	1710	53
10	Redcar Bears	38	8	7	2	2	1	1	1	3	13	1690	1792	52
11	Edinburgh Monarchs	38	13	1	1	4	1	1	0	2	15	1764	1737	51
12	Newcastle Diamonds	38	9	5	0	5	0	1	0	6	12	1693	1794	46
13	Plymouth Devils	38	4	7	1	7	0	1	0	1	17	1496	1929	31
14	Leicester Lions	38	4	1	4	10	1	1	0	2	15	1586	1886	27

Home: 3W = Home win by 7 points or more; 2W = Home win by between 1 and 6 points
Away: 4W = Away win by 7 points or more; 3W = Away win by between 1 and 6 points; 1L = Away loss by 6 points or less
M = Meetings; D = Draws; L = Losses; F = Race points for; A = Race points against; +/- = Race points difference; Pts = Total Points

Last updated: June 22, 2011

Source: BSPA

== Premier Shield ==
First leg

25 March 2011; 19.30	report	Edinburgh Monarchs	44 - 46	Newcastle Diamonds	Armadale Stadium, Armadale, West Lothian; Referee(s): Jim McGregor
Matthew Wethers 11	Stuart Robson 13

1	(Germany) Kevin Wölbert	0, 1', 0, 0	1+1
2	(Australia) Matthew Wethers (c)	1, 2, 3, 3, 2	11
3	(England) Andrew Tully	F, 0, 1, 3	4
4	(England) Craig Cook	3, 2, 3, 2, F	10
5	(Finland) Kalle Katajisto	3, 2, 3, 2	10
6	(England) Ashley Morris	2', 0, 0, 1'	3+2
7	(England) Jay Herne	3, 1, 0, 1	5
Manager: John Campbell

1	(Denmark) Rene Bach	2', 3, 1', 1	7+2
2	(Scotland) Derek Sneddon (c)	3, 1, 2, 2	8
3	(Czech Republic) Luboš Tomíček Jr.	1', 1, 1', 2	5+2
4	(England) Stuart Robson	2, 3, 2, 3, 3	13
5	(Australia) Mark Lemon	2, 3, 2, 3, 1	11
6	(England) Kyle Newman	1, 0, 1', F	2+1
7	(England) Richie Worrall	0, 0, 0, F	0
Manager: George English

Second leg

3 April 2011; 18.30	report	Newcastle Diamonds	48 (94) - 45 (89)	Edinburgh Monarchs	Newcastle Stadium, Newcastle; Referee(s): Michael Breckon
Stuart Robson 14	Andrew Tully 10+2

1	(Denmark) Rene Bach	3, 3, 3, 1, 1'	11+1
2	(Scotland) Derek Sneddon (c)	1, 1, 3, 1	6
3	(Czech Republic) Luboš Tomíček Jr.	0, 0, 0, 2	2
4	(England) Stuart Robson	3, 3, 3, 3, 2	14
5	(Australia) Mark Lemon	3, 3, 3, 0	9
6	(England) Kyle Newman	2, 0, 1, 1	4
7	(England) Richie Worrall	0, 2', 0, 0	2+1
Manager: George English

1	(Germany) Kevin Wölbert	0, 2, 2, 3, 0	7
2	(Australia) Matthew Wethers (c)	2, 1', 2, 0	5+1
3	(England) Andrew Tully	1', 1', 2, 6^	10+2
4	(England) Craig Cook	2, 2, 0, 2	6
5	(Finland) Kalle Katajisto	0, 2, 2, 2', 3	9+1
6	(England) Ashley Morris	1, 0, 1', 1	3+1
7	(Australia) Robert Branford (G)	3, 1, 1', 0	5+1
Manager: John Campbell

== Riders' Championship ==
Sam Masters won the Riders' Championship. The final was held on 25 September at Owlerton Stadium.

Pos.	Rider	Pts	Total	SF	Final
1	(Australia) Sam Masters	2 2 3 3 3	13	-	3
2	(England) Ricky Ashworth	3 3 3 fx 3	12	-	2
3	(Finland) Kauko Nieminen	3 2 3 3 fx	11	2	1
4	(England) Ben Barker	3 3 0 3 2	11	3	0
5	(Sweden) Sebastian Aldén	3 3 2 2 r	10	1	
6	(Australia) Jason Doyle	1 3 3 1 2	10	0	
7	(Australia) Rusty Harrison	1 2 2 1 3	9		
8	(Australia) Shane Parker	2 2 2 2 0	8		
9	(Australia) Kevin Doolan	0 1 1 3 3	8		
10	(Germany) Kevin Wölbert	2 0 2 1 2	7		
11	(Australia) Mark Lemon	1 1 0 2 1	5		
12	(Australia) Aaron Summers	0 0 1 2 1	4		
13	(England) Joe Screen	t 1 1 r 2	4		
14	(England) Ben Wilson	2 1 0 0 1	4		
15	(England) Jordan Frampton	f 0 1 0 0	1		
16	(England) Tom Woolley (res)	1	1		
17	(England) Luke Chessell (res)	0 0	0		
18	(Denmark) Charlie Gjedde	0 0	0		

- f=fell, r-retired, ex=excluded, ef=engine failure t=touched tapes

== Pairs ==
The Premier League Pairs Championship was held at Oaktree Arena on 24 June. The event was won by Glasgow Tigers.

Group A
Pos	Team	Pts	Riders
1	Glasgow	22	Screen 14, Grieves 8
2	Workington	19	Wright 12, Harrison 7
3	Newcastle	17	Robson 14, Sneddon 3
4	Leicester	16	Sweetman 9, Darkin 7
5	Rye House	16	Frampton 10, Neath 6

Group B
Pos	Team	Pts	Riders
1	Redcar	22	Summers 13, Lyons 9
2	Sheffield	20	Parker 12, Ashworth 8
3	Somerset	17	Gathercole 10, Masters 7
4	Ipswich	17	Poole 9, Doolan 8
5	Edinburgh	14	Cook 9, Tully 5

Semi finals

- Glasgow bt Sheffield 5–4
- Workington bt Redcar 5–4

Final

- Glasgow bt Workington 7–2

== Fours ==
Ipswich Witches won the Premier League Four-Team Championship, held on 23 October 2011, at Beaumont Park Stadium. The semi finals had been held on 7 August but the final was postponed due to rain.

Group A
Pos	Team	Pts	Riders
1	Leicester	21	Nieminen 6, Karlsson 6, Graversen 5, Bondarenko 4
2	Somerset	11	McGowan 4, Masters 3, Gathercole 2, Holder 2
3	Glasgow	10	Morris 4, Screen 2, Pjiper 2, Grieves 1, Rajkowski 1
4	Edinburgh	6	Wolbert 4, Tully 2, Cook 0, Katajisto 0

Group B
Pos	Team	Pts	Riders
1	Ipswich	15	Bjerre 5, Doolan 5, Risager 3, Hart 2
2	Workington	14	Lawson 13, Wright 4, Harrison 3, Topinka 2
3	Redcar	10	Juul 3, Lyons 3, Kus 3, Summers 1, Havelock 0
4	Sheffield	9	Parker 5, Sanchez 2, Auty 1, Ashworth 1

Final
Pos	Team	Pts	Riders
1	Ipswich	44	Trésarrieu 12 Bjerre 12, Doolan 10, Risager 9, Poole 1
2	Leicester	33	Nieminen 14, Karlsson 13, Graversen 6, Bondarenko 0, Garrity 0
3	Workington	30	Lawson 13, Harrison 8, Ingalls 7, Nielsen 2, Kerr 0
4	Somerset	21	Gathercole 10, Wright 5, Savies 3, Perry 2, Holder 1

== Final leading averages ==
Rider	Team	Average
(Denmark) Charlie Gjedde	Newport	10.25
(England) Ben Barker	Plymouth	10.01
(England) Stuart Robson	Newcastle	9.56
(England) Joe Screen	Glasgow	9.54
(Australia) Shane Parker	Sheffield	9.43
(England) Chris Neath	Rey House	9.13
(Sweden) Magnus Karlsson	Leicester	8.93
(Australia) Mark Lemon	Newcastle	8.88
(Germany) Kevin Wölbert	Edinburgh	8.82
(Australia) Josh Grajczonek	Glasgow	8.74

== Riders & final averages ==
Berwick

- Sebastian Aldén 8.41
- Kozza Smith 8.40
- Josef Franc 8.19
- Lee Complin 7.61
- Linus Eklöf 7.47
- Charlie Gjedde 7.06
- Ludvig Lindgren 6.29
- Hynek Stichauer 5.93
- Jade Mudgway 4.74
- Alex Edberg 4.00
- Mitchell Davey 3.71
- Tamas Sike 2.60

Edinburgh

- Kevin Wölbert 8.82
- Andrew Tully 8.14
- Craig Cook 8.09
- Matthew Wethers 8.00
- Kalle Katajisto 6.11
- Kyle Howarth 5.07
- Byron Bekker 3.10
- Lee Dicken 2.70
- Ashley Morris 2.24
- Tim Webster 2.15

Glasgow

- Joe Screen 9.54
- Josh Grajczonek 8.74
- James Grieves 8.12
- Nick Morris 8.06
- Theo Pijper 6.84
- Christian Henry 6.26
- Michał Rajkowski 6.10
- Richard Sweetman 5.95
- David Bellego 5.93

Ipswich

- Lasse Bjerre 8.27
- Kevin Doolan 8.06
- Taylor Poole 7.66
- Mathieu Trésarrieu 7.33
- Morten Risager 7.01
- Chris Schramm 6.97
- Chris Mills 6.68
- Jerran Hart 4.98

Leicester

- Magnus Karlsson 8.93
- Kauko Nieminen 7.86
- Richard Hall 7.50
- Sergei Darkin 6.92
- Richard Sweetman 6.83
- Henning Bager 6.32
- Ilya Bondarenko 5.45
- Jan Graversen 5.32
- Viktor Bergström 4.71
- Charles Wright 4.64
- Jason Garrity 4.43
- John Oliver 4.26
- Jamie Courtney 2.64

Newcastle

- Stuart Robson 9.56
- Mark Lemon 8.88
- René Bach 7.35
- Claes Nedermark 6.55
- Derek Sneddon 6.53
- Kyle Newman 5.49
- Richie Worrall 4.50
- Luboš Tomíček Jr. 4.00
- Jason King 2.88
- Joe Haines 2.81

Newport

- Charlie Gjedde 10.25
- Jason Doyle 8.73
- Leigh Lanham 8.42
- Kyle Legault 7.02
- Kim Nilsson 6.75
- Anders Mellgren 6.69
- Robin Aspegren 6.61
- Justin Sedgmen 6.32
- Todd Kurtz 6.05
- Mark Jones 4.22

Plymouth

- Ben Barker 10.01
- Ricky Wells 7.05
- Jesper Kristiansen 6.24
- Mark Simmonds 5.58
- Jason Bunyan 5.33
- Hynek Štichauer 4.70
- Kyle Hughes 4.58
- James Cockle 4.50
- Guglielmo Franchetti 4.04
- Lee Smart 3.52

Redcar

- Jason Lyons 8.61
- Aaron Summers 7.96
- Matěj Kůs 7.52
- Gary Havelock 7.08
- Adam Roynon 6.08
- Peter Juul 4.50
- Luboš Tomíček Jr. 4.18
- Robert Branford 3.30

Rye House

- Chris Neath 9.13
- Jason Doyle 8.39
- Jordan Frampton 8.04
- Steve Boxall 6.34
- Ritchie Hawkins 6.17
- Luke Bowen 5.83
- Tyson Nelson 5.78
- James Brundle 4.26
- Ben Morley 2.39

Scunthorpe

- David Howe 8.53
- Richard Hall 8.00
- Tero Aarnio 7.17
- Ben Wilson 6.57
- Thomas Jorgensen 6.52
- Viktor Bergström 6.19
- Michael Palm Toft 6.08
- Carl Wilkinson 5.43
- Joe Haines 4.82
- Steve Worrall 4.40

Sheffield

- Shane Parker 9.43
- Ricky Ashworth 8.89
- Josh Auty 8.08
- Emiliano Sanchez 6.67
- Hugh Skidmore 6.61
- Simon Lambert 6.51
- Ashley Birks 4.49

Somerset

- Sam Masters 8.33
- Christian Hefenbrock 8.09
- Dakota North 7.81
- Cory Gathercole 7.37
- James Wright 7.30
- Travis McGowan 7.20
- Alex Davies 6.49
- Anders Mellgren 6.10
- James Holder 5.06

Workington

- Peter Kildemand 8.56
- Richard Lawson 8.37
- Rusty Harrison 8.22
- James Wright 8.14
- Tomáš Topinka 7.29
- Kenny Ingalls 6.48
- Charles Wright 4.85
- Gary Irving 4.69
- Simon Nielsen 4.39

== See also ==
- List of United Kingdom Speedway League Champions
- Knockout Cup (speedway)
