= Bill Landels =

Scottish and Australian motorcycle speedway rider

- Born: 24 July 1938 (age 88); Edinburgh, Scotland
- Nationality: British (Scottish)

Career history
- 1960–1967: Edinburgh Monarchs

Individual honours
- 1966: Scottish Open champion

William Duncan Landels (born 24 July 1938) is a former international motorcycle speedway rider from Scotland. He earned one international cap for the England national speedway team, three caps for the Scotland national speedway team and eight caps for the Australia national speedway team.

== Biography ==
Landels, born in Edinburgh, was a significant grasstrack rider and won Scottish titles in 1958 and 1959.

Landels began his British leagues career riding for Edinburgh Monarchs during the 1960 Provincial Speedway League. He missed the 1961 and 1962 seasons after being posted abroad by the army before returning in late 1963 and finally racing regularly.

Landels remained with Edinburgh during the formation of the British League in 1965 and the following season was a shock winner of the Scottish Open, defeating riders of the calibre of the legendary Ivan Mauger.

Landels went on to earn three international caps for Scotland and then one for England in December 1967, during the winter test series in Australia. He finished his Edinburgh career in 1967.

It is unknown if Landels remained in Australia after the 1967 test series but he did emigrate shortly afterwards. He had the ununsual scenario whereby he represented a third national team thereafter by being selected to represent Australia.
