= Fernando Garcia (speedway rider) =

Argentine speedway rider

Coty Garcia
- Born: 2 August 1994 (age 32); Colonia Barón, Argentina
- Nationality: Argentinian

Career history

Great Britain
- 2015, 2019: Berwick Bandits
- 2016: Glasgow Tigers
- 2017: Redcar Bears
- 2018: Ipswich Witches
- 2018: Edinburgh Monarchs

Individual honours
- 2020: Argentine National Champion

Team honours
- 2016: Knockout Cup

Fernando Garcia (born 2 August 1994) is an Argentine motorcycle speedway rider. He rides as Coty Garcia in speedway leagues and is a former national champion of Argentina.

== Biography ==
Born in Colonia Barón, Argentina, Garcia first rode a motor bike aged just six year old in his home town of Salazar. He rode in the final two rounds of the 2012 Speedway Under-21 World Championship.

Garcia first came to British speedway when he signed for Berwick Bandits for the 2015 Premier League speedway season. The following season, he signed for Scottish rivals Glasgow Tigers and improved his average by over two points and was a member of the Knockout Cup winning team. Redcar Bears signed him for the SGB Championship 2017.

During the 2018 season, Garcia rode for both Ipswich Witches and Edinburgh Monarchs before returning to Berwick for the 2019 season.

In 2020, Garcia won the Argentine Championship. He also win the 2022 Winter national championships.
