= James Sarjeant =

British speedway rider (born 1993)

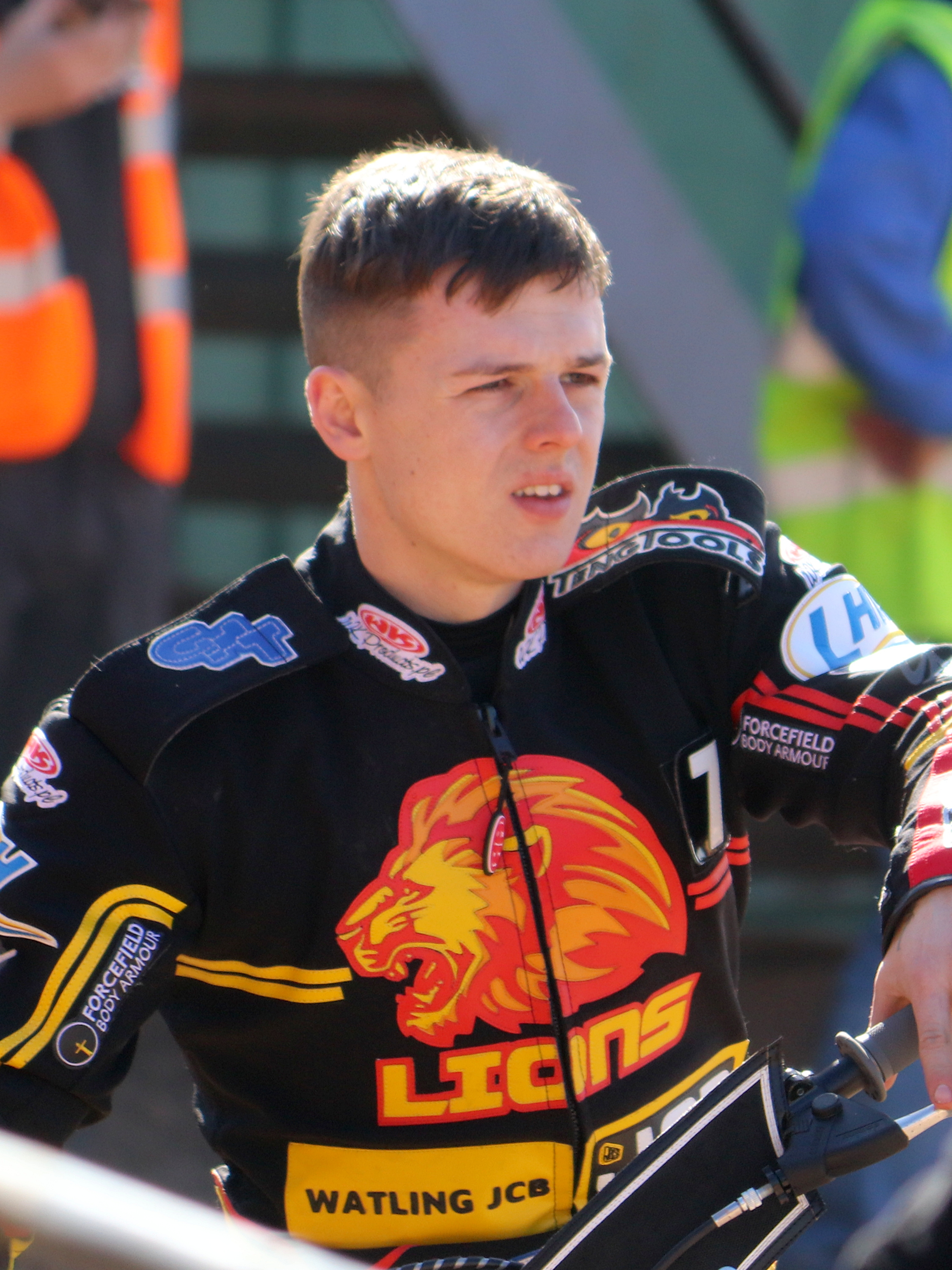
- Born: 16 November 1993 (age 33); Sheffield, England
- Nationality: British (English)

Career history
- 2009: Scunthorpe Saints
- 2010: Dudley Heathens
- 2010: Bournemouth Buccaneers
- 2011: Stoke Potters
- 2012: Rye House Raiders
- 2013–2016: Coventry Storm/Bees
- 2013, 2018: Leicester Lions
- 2015, 2018–2019: Glasgow Tigers
- 2017, 2019: Ipswich Witches
- 2017: Workington Comets
- 2019–2020, 2022: Edinburgh Monarchs
- 2021: Redcar Bears

Individual honours
- 2014, 2015: New Zealand Solo Champion

James Sarjeant (born 16 November 1993) is a former speedway rider from England.

== Career ==
Sarjeant took up speedway at the age of nine on 80cc bikes, progressing to 500cc bikes by the age of eleven, and was the Sheffield Tigers mascot as a child. He signed as a Coventry Bees asset in 2009 and the same season made his National League debut for Scunthorpe Saints. He signed for Dudley Heathens in 2010, but lost his place mid-season to Micky Dyer; He subsequently joined Bournemouth Buccaneers but injury restricted him to four appearances for the team. In 2011 he joined Stoke Potters and by the end of the season his Greensheet Average had risen to 6.30. He made his debut for the Great Britain Under-21 side that year against the United States. He rode for Rye House Raiders in 2012, finishing the season as the team's second highest averaged rider (behind Jason Garrity) on 7.87. In 2013 he signed for his parent club's National League team, Coventry Storm, and after impressing in guest rides for several teams at Premier League level was signed by Leicester Lions in July, replacing his Storm team mate Robert Branford. He was picked by Elite League Coventry Bees in the reserve draft for their 2014 team and continued with Coventry Storm as team captain in the National League.

Sarjeant won the New Zealand Solo Championship in January 2015.

In 2021, Sarjeant rode for Redcar Bears in the SGB Championship 2021 and in 2022, he rode for the Edinburgh Monarchs in the SGB Championship 2022. He announced his retirement after the 2022 season saying "it was time to go" after a run of injuries.
