= Northside Speedway =

Stadium in Workington, England

- Location: Northside Road, Workington, Cumbria, England CA14 1NQ
- Coordinates: 54°39′23″N 3°33′30″W
- Operator: Motorcycle speedway
- Opened: 2022

Northside Speedway or the GT Tyres Arena for sponsorship prurposes is a motorcycle speedway venue on the west side of the A596, north of Workington. The venue is used by the Workington Comets who compete in the British speedway leagues.

== History ==
The site was originally a speedway training track but was developed during 2021 to enable league racing. A speedway team, under the control of local businessman Andrew Bain, was set to enter the 2022 National Development League speedway season but a series of vandalism incidents at the circuit pushed back the intended opening date.

In 2023, the team finally began racing during the 2023 National Development League speedway season, it was also agreed that the team could take the name of a former speedway club called the Workington Comets, who had previously raced at Derwent Park.

In 2024, a two-year naming rights deal was agreed with GT Tyres to name the arena the GT Tyres Arena.

== See also ==
- Workington Comets
