= Old Meadowbank =

Sports facility in Edinburgh, Scotland

- Location within the City of Edinburgh council area
- Location: Edinburgh, Scotland
- Coordinates: 55.9570°N 3.158874°W
- Closed: 1967

Tenants
- Leith Athletic F.C.; Edinburgh Monarchs

Old Meadowbank was a multi-purpose sports facility located in the Meadowbank area of Edinburgh, Scotland. It was mainly used as a football stadium by Leith Athletic between the 1930s and 1950s and as a motorcycle speedway track. The stadium was demolished in the late 1960s and provided part of the site for Meadowbank Sports Centre, which was used for the Commonwealth Games in 1970 and 1986.

== Uses ==
=== Football ===
Leith Athletic played at Old Meadowbank from the 1930s until their demise in 1955. In the early 1950s it was the location of a football match played under temporary floodlights against an invitation XI including the Edinburgh born Jimmy Logie, then playing for Arsenal. This was prior to the two senior clubs in Edinburgh, Hearts and Hibernian, themselves installing permanent floodlights.

=== Speedway ===
Old Meadowbank was a motorcycle speedway track that ran from 1948 to 1954 and 1960 to 1967. The stadium was located between what is the new Meadowbank Stadium and the Meadowbank Velodrome, roughly perpendicular to where the 5-aside football pitch at Meadowbank sits today. Old Meadowbank was home to speedway team the Edinburgh Monarchs. The sport stopped in 1954, when the post-war entertainment tax started to make the sport unprofitable. Whilst the Monarchs of this era achieved little as a team, they did introduce Aussie Jack Young to UK speedway. Young won the World Championship in 1951 as a Monarchs rider.

Meadowbank was also the track where the 1955 and 1962 World Champion Peter Craven of England lost his life in a freak accident on 20 September 1963. While taking evasive action to avoid hitting fallen race leader George Hunter who had suffered engine failure, Craven hit the fence. Craven suffered serious head injuries in the crash and was rushed to hospital where his family remained at his bedside, he died four days later.

The entertainment tax was later scrapped, and the sport was reintroduced to Edinburgh in 1960. The track was used for training purposes for a spell in the late 1950s and 1959 an Edinburgh Students Charites meeting was staged at the track. The Monarchs of the 1960s were founder members of the Provincial League (1960–1964) and founder members of the British league in 1965. The Monarchs were forced to leave Old Meadowbank in 1967 to allow the stadium to be re-developed for the 1970 Commonwealth Games. Speedway was not incorporated in the new stadium as the Government of the day would not fund stadiums which would be used by professional sports.

The displaced Monarchs raced at Cliftonhill in Coatbridge for two seasons before they closed down when the promotion sold the licence to a consortium who re-opened Wembley Stadium for speedway. Speedway was revived in Edinburgh at Powderhall Stadium which operated 1977 to 1995. The Monarchs are now based at the Armadale Stadium, on the eastern outskirts of Armadale in West Lothian.
