= Mark Riss =

German speedway rider

- Born: 13 September 1994 (age 32); Memmingen, Germany
- Nationality: German

Career history

Germany
- 2012: Herxheim

Great Britain
- 2016–2018: Edinburgh Monarchs
- 2017–2018: Wolverhampton Wolves
- 2018: Ipswich Witches
- 2018: Belle Vue Aces

Mark Riss (born 13 September 1994) is a speedway rider from Germany.

== Speedway career ==
Riss rode in the top tier of British Speedway, riding for the Belle Vue Aces and Wolverhampton Wolves in the SGB Premiership 2018. He began his British career riding for Edinburgh Monarchs in 2016 and rode for them for three seasons. He also rode for Wolverhampton Wolves from 2017 to 2018.

== Family ==
Riss is the son of Gerd Riss, one of the leading German riders of all time. His brother Erik Riss also rides at the highest level.
