= Richie Worrall =

English motorcycle speedway rider (born 1991)

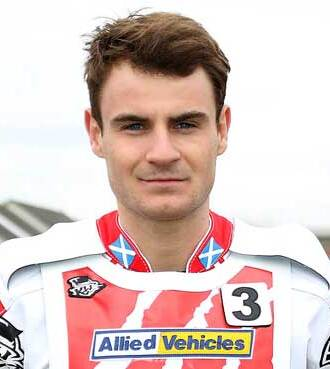
- Born: 23 September 1991 (age 35); St. Helens, Merseyside, England
- Nationality: British (English)

Career history

Great Britain:
- 2011: Scunthorpe & Sheffield Saints
- 2011-14: Newcastle Diamonds
- 2012: Stoke Potters
- 2012: Lakeside Hammers
- 2013, 2022: King's Lynn Stars
- 2014, 2016, 2021: Belle Vue Aces
- 2014: Ipswich Witches
- 2015: Somerset Rebels
- 2016–2018: Glasgow Tigers
- 2017, 2020–2021: Edinburgh Monarchs
- 2017–2019: Poole Pirates
- 2019, 2022, 2023: Leicester Lions
- 2023: Peterborough Panthers
- 2023: Plymouth Gladiators

Team honours
- 2011: Premier Shield
- 2011: National League

Richard Leonard Worrall (born 23 September 1991) is an English motorcycle speedway rider who in 2012 reached the final of the World Under-21 Championship.

== Biography ==
Worrall was born in St. Helens, Merseyside, the slightly elder of twins, the other being Steve Worrall, also now a speedway rider. Initially a motocross rider, he made his league debut in speedway in 2010 with Scunthorpe Saints in the National League. For 2011, he was signed by Premier League Newcastle Diamonds, with whom he won the Premier Shield, also continuing to ride in the National League with Sheffield/Scunthorpe, for whom he averaged 7.75 over a season in which the team won the league. He stayed with Newcastle in 2012, when he was joined by his brother, and also rode in the National League for Stoke Potters and in the Elite League with Lakeside Hammers.

In June 2012, Worrall qualified for the World Under-21 Final, the first British rider to do so for three years. At the end of the month, however, a double break to his leg sustained in a crash at Workington ended his season.

Worrall spent the 2016 season with both the Glasgow Tigers and Belle Vue Aces. With Glasgow, Richie started the season fourth in the Glasgow team averages on a 6.84 Avg. Richie was a strong, consistent scorer for Glasgow both home and away, and finished the season in the number one race jacket. He led Glasgow to victory in the Premier League KO CUP final against Newcastle in October 2016. With the Aces in 2016, Worrall helped his team get to the Elite League final, and most notably won a race against former World Champion Tai Woffinden, very impressive for the Aces reserve.

For the 2017 Season, Worrall only signed for the Glasgow Tigers, after promotion at Belle Vue decided that he wasn't going to be in their 2017 team-building plans.

Worrall rode for the Poole Pirates in the SGB Premiership 2019 and the Leicester Lions in the SGB Championship 2019. After a cancelled 2020 British season, he signed for the Belle Vue Aces in the SGB Premiership and the Edinburgh Monarchs in the SGB Championship.

In 2022, Worrall rode for the King's Lynn Stars in the SGB Premiership 2022 and for the Leicester Lions in the SGB Championship 2022.

In 2023, Worrall signed for Peterborough Panthers in the SGB Premiership 2023 and Plymouth Gladiators for the SGB Championship 2023.
