= Steve Worrall =

British speedway rider (born 1991)

- Born: 23 September 1991 (age 35); St Helens, Merseyside, England
- Nationality: British

Career history

Great Britain
- 2010–2011, 2018, 2025: Scunthorpe
- 2012–2013, 2015–2017, 2019: Newcastle
- 2013: King's Lynn
- 2013: Redcar
- 2013: Stoke
- 2014: Cradley
- 2014: Edinburgh
- 2014: Swindon
- 2015–2021: Belle Vue
- 2020–2023: Poole
- 2022–2023: Wolverhampton
- 2024: Birmingham
- 2024: Glasgow

Poland
- 2017–2018: Rawicz
- 2023–2024: Daugavpils

Team honours
- 2017: tier 1 KO Cup winner
- 2014, 2021, 2022: tier 2 champions
- 2014, 2021, 2022: tier 2 KO Cup winner
- 2014: tier 2 League Cup
- 2011, 2014: tier 3 champions

Steven Edward Worrall (born 23 September 1991) is a motorcycle speedway rider from England.

== Career ==
Born in St Helens, the twin brother of Richie Worrall, Steve competed in motocross before taking up speedway in 2009 and had his first competitive season in 2010 with Scunthorpe Saints in the National League. In 2011, he was part of the combined Scunthorpe/Sheffield team that won the league, and the same year finished as runner up to Tai Woffinden in the British Under-21 Championship.

In 2012, Worrall moved up to the Premier League, riding for Newcastle Diamonds along with his brother, a season interrupted by a broken leg sustained in July.

Worrall stayed at Newcastle in 2013 but after losing confidence dropped down to the National League, riding for King's Lynn Young Stars and then Stoke Potters. He returned to the Premier League later that season with Redcar Bears, replacing the injured Max Dilger.

In 2014, Worrall rode for Swindon Robins in the Elite League via the fast track draft system, and was part of the Premier League, League Cup, and Premier League Knockout Cup-winning record breaking Edinburgh Monarchs team, while also riding for Cradley Heathens in the National League, that team also winning multiple trophies. Worrall came close to individual honours, finishing as runner up to Danny Halsey in the National League Riders' Championship. He was voted by readers of the Swindon Advertiser as the Robins Rider of the Year.

In late 2014, Worrall was signed by Belle Vue Aces for the 2015 Elite League season, and signed to return to Newcastle Diamonds in the Premier League.

Worrall reached the Elite League Grand Final with the Belle Vue Aces against the Poole Pirates in September 2015. Worrall remained with Belle Vue for six seasons and won the 2017 Division 1 KO Cup. He also rode for Newcastle and Scunthorpe in division 2.

In 2020, Worrall joined the Poole Pirates in the SGB Championship and in 2021 Worrall helped Poole win the league and cup double.

In 2022, Worrall rode for the Wolverhampton Wolves in the SGB Premiership 2022 and remained with Poole in the SGB Championship 2022. With Poole, he was part of the team that retained the tier 2 League and KO Cup double crown.

In 2023, Worrall re-signed for Wolves for the SGB Premiership 2023 and also re-signed for Poole for the SGB Championship 2023, where he was named the team captain after taking over from the departing Danny King. He finished runner-up behind Dan Bewley in the 2023 British Speedway Championship, which qualified him to compete in the 2023 British Grand Prix as the wild card rider.

Following the demise of Wolverhampton, Worrall signed for Birmingham Brummies for the 2024 Premiership season. and signed for Glasgow Tigers for the 2024 Championship season.

Worrall returned to Scunthorpe Scorpions for the SGB Championship 2025.

== Major results ==
=== World individual Championship ===
- 2023 Speedway Grand Prix - =26th
