= Michał Rajkowski =

Polish speedway rider

- Born: 17 December 1984 (age 41); Skwierzyna, Poland
- Nationality: Polish

Career history

Poland
- 2001–2006: Gorzów
- 2009: Piła

Great Britain
- 2007: Newport
- 2008: Belle Vue
- 2008: Mildenhall
- 2009: Edinburgh
- 2010: Berwick
- 2010: Stoke
- 2011: Glasgow
- 2012: Redcar

Michał Rajkowski (born 17 December 1984) is a Polish former motorcycle speedway rider.

== Career ==
In 2007, Rajkowski signed for the Newport Wasps and then in 2008, he rode in the highest tier of British speedway for the Belle Vue Aces. The following season (2009), he rode for the Edinburgh Monarchs and Polonia Piła in the Polish Liga II.

In 2010, Rajkowski rode for Berwick Bandits and Stoke Potters before joining the Glasgow Tigers in the 2011 British Premier League. His last appearance in Britain was during 2012, when he made a handful of starts for the Redcar Bears.
