= Matthew Wethers =

Australian speedway rider

- Born: 30 May 1985 (age 41); Adelaide, South Australia
- Nationality: Australian

Career history
- 2003-2012: Edinburgh Monarchs
- 2005: Glasgow Tigers
- 2005: King's Lynn Stars
- 2006, 2007, 2010, 2012: Wolverhampton Wolves
- 2006: Poole Pirates
- 2013, 2014, 2016: Berwick Bandits
- 2015: Workington Comets
- 2018, 2019, 2021: Newcastle Diamonds

Matthew James Wethers (born 30 May 1985) is a motorcycle speedway rider from Australia.

== Speedway career ==
Wethers began his British career riding for Edinburgh Monarchs in 2003, where he spent ten consecutive seasons from 2003 to 2012. During the 2003 season, Wethers also rode for Armadale Devils (The Edinburgh junior team) in the Conference Trophy and Knockout Cup.

Wethers rode in the top tier of British Speedway riding for the Wolverhampton Wolves during the 2010 Elite League speedway season.

After joining Berwick Bandits in 2013, Wethers was made the club captain and the following season in 2014, he suffered a serious hip injury in a crash.

In 2018, Wethers joined Newcastle Diamonds and was later part of the team that competed in the SGB Championship 2021 and SGB Championship 2022.
