= Aaron Summers (speedway rider) =

Australian speedway rider (born 1988)

- Born: 1 March 1988 (age 38); Adelaide, South Australia
- Nationality: Australian

Career history

Great Britain
- 2007: Buxton Hitmen
- 2007–2009: Edinburgh Monarchs
- 2008, 2011–2014: Redcar Bears
- 2010: Birmingham Brummies
- 2010, 2012–2013: Coventry Bees
- 2015: Swindon Robins
- 2015–2017: Glasgow Tigers
- 2016: Leicester Lions
- 2018–2021: Berwick Bandits
- 2018: Rye House Rockets
- 2018: Somerset Rebels
- 2019: Peterborough Panthers
- 2022: Ipswich Witches
- 2022: Oxford Cheetahs

Poland
- 2018: Kraków

Individual honours
- 1994: Australian Under-16 Solo Champion

Team honours
- 2008: Premier Trophy
- 2008: Premier League
- 2010: Elite League
- 2010: Premier League Fours Champion

Aaron Richard Summers (born 1 March 1988) is an Australian former motorcycle speedway rider.

== Career ==
Born in Adelaide, Summers first had success as a junior, winning the Australian Under-16 Solo Championship in 2004.

Summers began his British speedway career in 2007, riding for Buxton Hitmen in the Conference League and Edinburgh Monarchs in the Premier League. In his second season, he won the Premier League and the Premier Trophy with the Monarchs, also riding for Redcar Bears' Conference League team.

In 2009, Summers stayed with the Monarchs, and the following year rode for Birmingham Brummies in the Premier League and for Coventry Bees in their title-winning Elite League season. He was part of the Birmingham four who won the Premier League Four-Team Championship, on 15 August 2010, at the East of England Arena.

In 2011, Summers began a four-year stay with Redcar Bears in the Premier League and in 2012 and 2013 returned to the Coventry Bees Elite League team. In 2015 he left the Bears and signed for Glasgow Tigers where he captained the team, doubling up in the Elite League with Swindon Robins and ending the season with a 6.82 Elite League CMA. He started the 2016 season with Tigers but with no Elite League place, but was signed by Leicester Lions in April to replace Grzegorz Walasek.

Summers rode for Berwick Bandits and Peterborough Panthers during 2019 and remained with Berwick for the 2021 season. In 2022, he rode for the Ipswich Witches in the SGB Premiership 2022 and also joined the Oxford Cheetahs for the SGB Championship 2022. The Cheetahs were returning to action after a 14-year absence from British Speedway.

After the 2022 season, Summers returned to Australia and retired from speedway.

== Honours ==
=== Individual ===
- Australian Under-16 Champion (2004)

=== Team ===
- Premier Trophy (2008 - Edinburgh Monarchs)
- Premier League (2008 - Edinburgh Monarchs)
- Premier League Play-Off winner (2008, 2009 - Edinburgh Monarchs)
- Elite League (2010 - Coventry Bees)
- Premier League Four-Team Championship (2010 - Birmingham Brummies)
