= Edinburgh Monarchs =

Sports club in City of Edinburgh, Scotland

Club information
- Track address: Armadale Stadium; Bathgate Road; Armadale; West Lothian
- Country: Scotland
- Founded: 1928; 98 years ago
- Promoter: Alex Harkess & John Campbell
- Team manager: Alex Harkess & John Campbell
- Team captain: Paco Castagna
- League: SGB Championship; National Development League
- Website: official website

Club facts
- Colours: Blue and gold
- Track size: 260 metres (280 yd)
- Track record time: 54.0 seconds
- Track record date: 30 May 2014
- Track record holder: Craig Cook

Current senior team
Rider	CMA
(Italy) Paco Castagna (capt)
(Sweden) Jonatan Grahn
(England) Dan Thompson
(Australia) Kye Thomson
(Australia) Justin Sedgmen
(Australia) Mitchell Cluff
(Australia) Jordy Loftus

Current junior team
Rider	CMA
(England) Connor Coles
(England) Vinnie Foord
(Australia) Jordy Loftus
(Australia) Dayle Wood
(Australia) Anika Loftus
(England) Jamie Halder
(England) Ben Whalley

Major team honours
Premier League	2003, 2008, 2010, 2014, 2015
Knockout Cup (tier 2)	1981, 1997, 1999, 2014
Premier League Cup	2014, 2015
Premier Trophy	2008
Fours Championship (tier 2)	1981, 1993, 2013, 2015
Pairs Championship (tier 2)	1986, 2014
Scottish Cup	2018
Queens Cup	1953

The Edinburgh Monarchs are a Scottish speedway team based in Armadale. They compete in the SGB Championship, racing on Friday nights during the speedway season. The club is run by a board of directors, chaired by Alex Harkess and also runs a National Development League team called the Monarchs Academy.

== History ==
=== Origins ===
Speedway in Edinburgh began on 19 May 1928, with an open meeting organised by the Scottish Dirt Track Motor Racing Club at Marine Gardens in Portobello. Several team challenge matches were staged during 1929, including visits to London and Newcastle.

=== 1930s ===
The team joined Northern League for the 1930 season. Several open meetings were held in 1931 but speedway ceased. The Greyhound Racing Association secured a lease on New Year's Day 1931, which resulted in the disappearance of speedway for seven years until March 1938, when J. W. Fraser brought it back. In 1939, the team raced in multiple challenge matches and the Union Cup before the season ended early due to the outbreak of war.

=== 1940s ===
Marine Gardens was used for military purposes during the war and never re-opened as a sports venue but the potential of Old Meadowbank, then the home of Leith Athletic F.C., was said to have been spotted by Ian Hoskins. The Monarchs (Meadowbank Monarchs) were re-established in 1948 by a consortium including Frank Varey, ex-rider and Sheffield promoter, and R.L.Rae, a local Edinburgh businessman. They applied to the Speedway Control Board to participate in the 1948 Speedway National League Division Two but finished bottom of the league that season. They did however improve to 5th place after Jack Young was signed to support Dick Campbell. Young would become twice world champion in 1951 ad 1952, the first of those titles was won as an Edinburgh rider.

=== 1950s ===
The team continued to operate at Old Meadowbank in the National League Second Division, securing a 3rd place finish in 1951, with Jack Young setting the league's leading average. Mid-way through the 1954 season the club withdrew from the league citing financial losses and Frank Varey also resigned. Old Meadowbank Stadium had been purchased by the City of Edinburgh Council from Leith Athletic in 1956 and the track was used for practice sessions between 1957 and 1959.

=== 1960s ===
With the creation of the new Provincial League in 1960, Edinburgh Monarchs returned to action under the new promotion of Ian Hoskins, following a six-year absence. New riders for 1960 included the Templeton brothers Doug and Willie, and George Hunter, joined in later seasons by Bert Harkins and Bill Landels.

Five years of Provincial league speedway brought little success but George Hunter did top the league averages during the 1963 season and the team retained the practice of employing primarily Scottish riders. The Monarchs raced in and were founder members of the newly created British League from 1965. The league was the highest division of speedway in the United Kingdom and the it was first time that Edinburgh had competed in the top tier. The Monarchs struggled somewhat in the division but did achieve a very respectable fourth in 1967 led by Swede Bernt Persson.

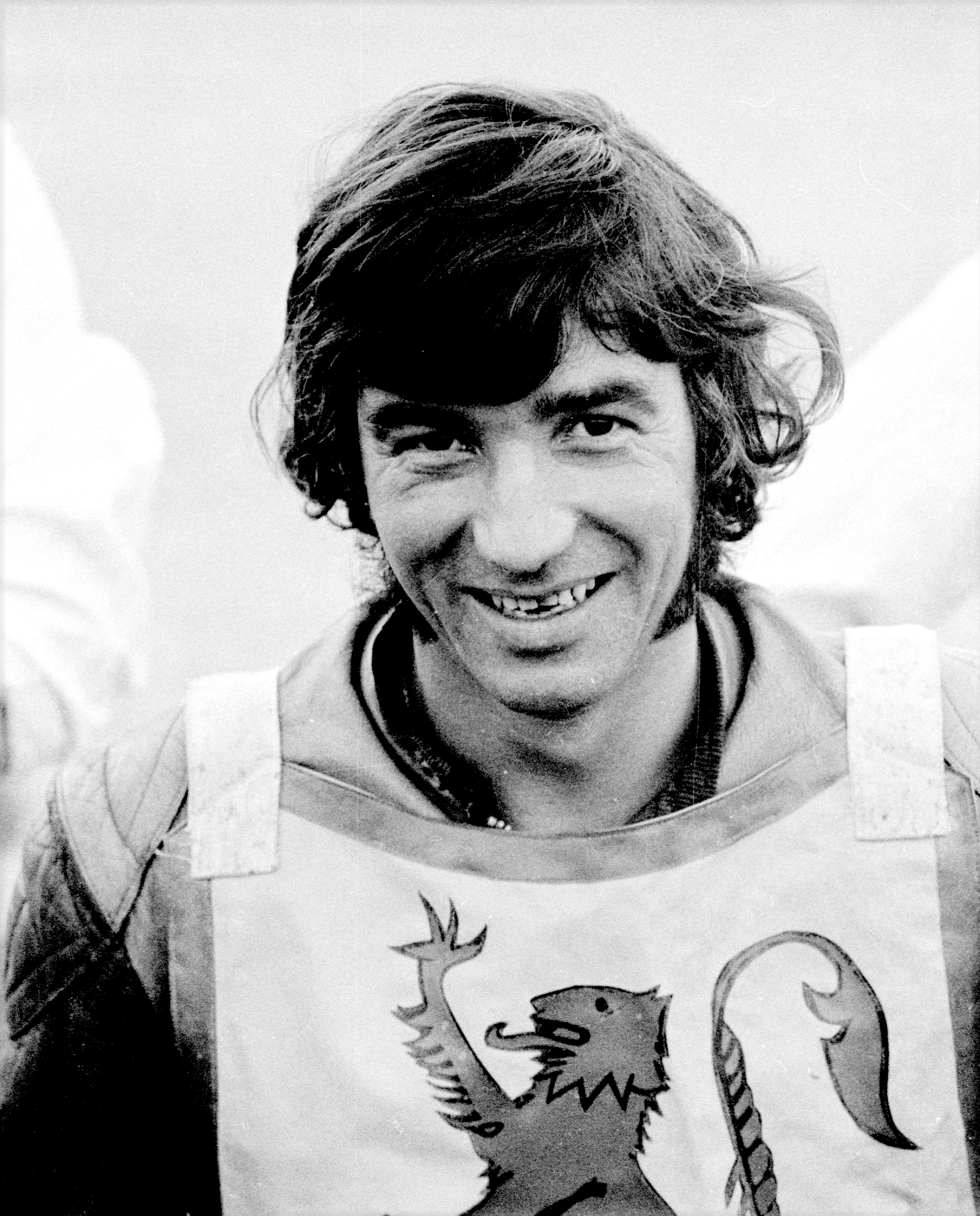
George Hunter

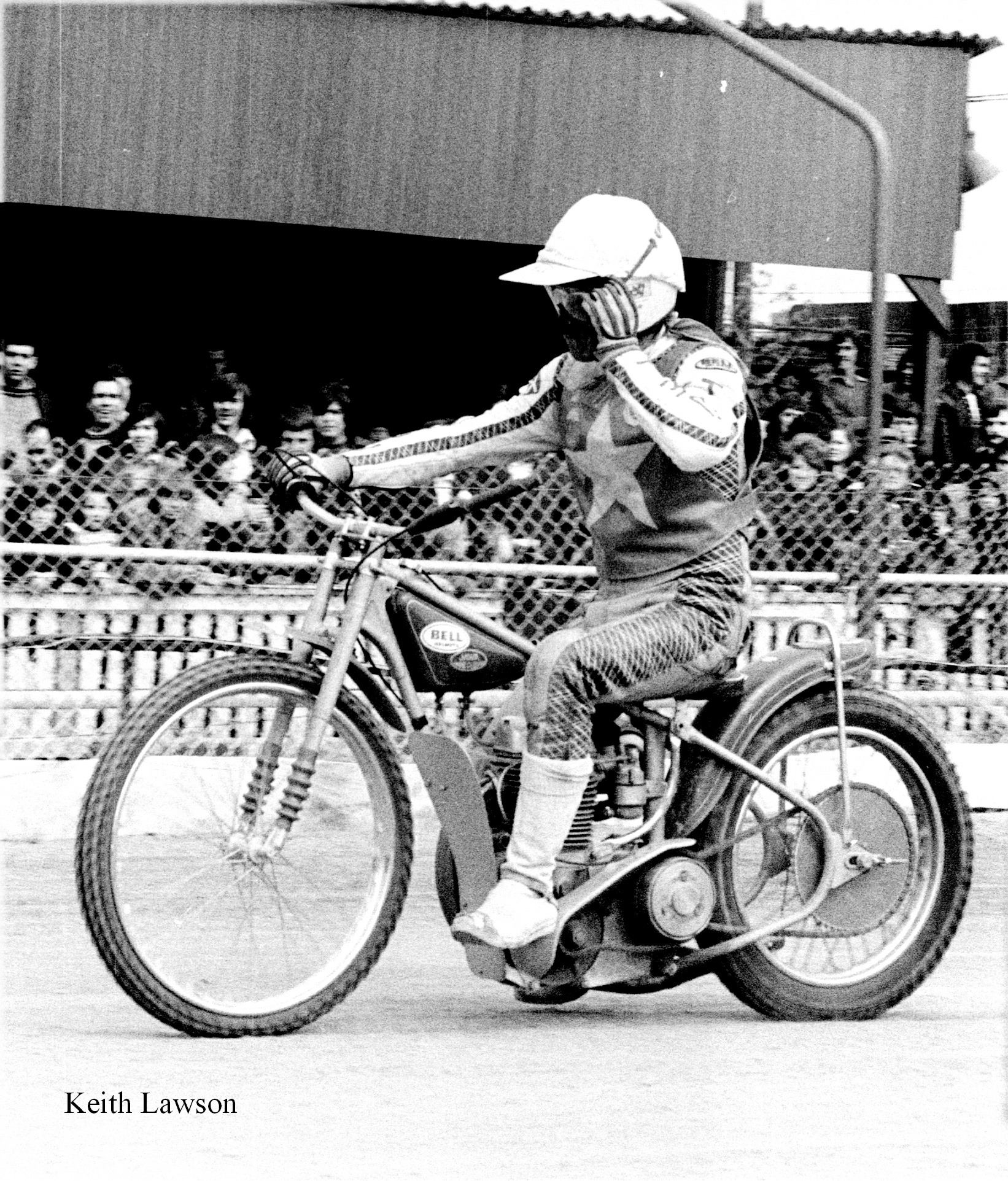
Bert Harkins

In August 1966, Edinburgh won the bid to host the 1970 Commonwealth Games, which included plans to redevelop the site of the stadium and surrounding area. The Monarchs were evicted as speedway was not incorporated into the new Meadowbank Stadium plans due to the government of the day refusing to fund stadia which would be used by professional sports. The Monarchs moved en bloc to a new track at Cliftonhill, Coatbridge (nearer to Glasgow than Edinburgh) and operated as the Coatbridge Monarchs for the 1968 and 1969 seasons before the track licence was sold to Wembley by B.R. Cottrell and Trevor Redman.

=== 1970s ===
Speedway returned to Edinburgh in 1977, with the Monarchs finding a home at Powderhall Stadium. The return after missing another seven years required significant changes to the greyhound racing venue and Mike Parker spent £30,000 on renovation. Bert Harkins returned as captain of the club

=== 1980s ===
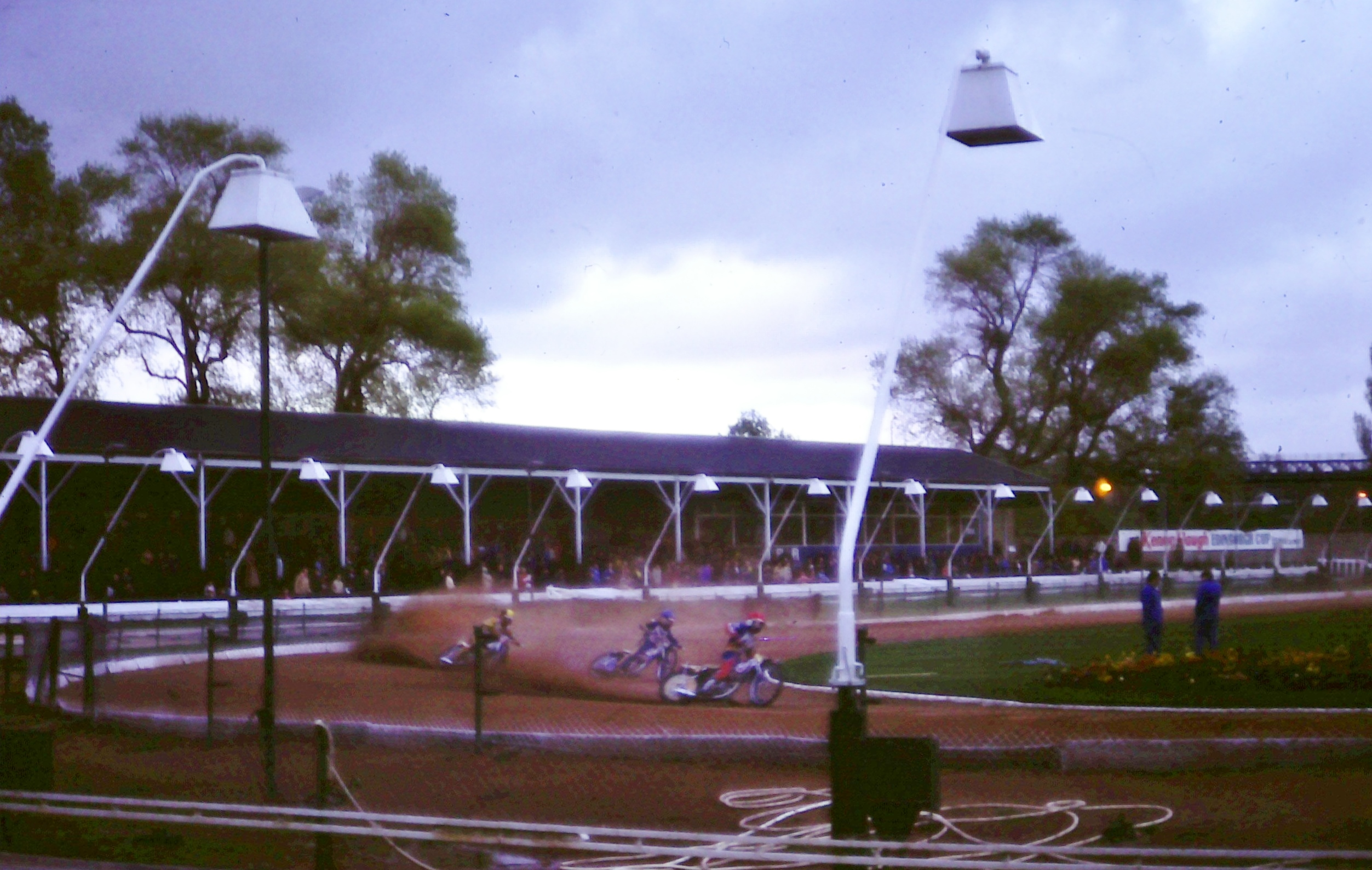
Speedway at Powderhall Stadium, 1982

George Hunter came back to the club in 1980 and Neil Collins was signed which led to a 5th place finish. The following season in 1981, the long wait for silverware ended when the team won the Knockout Cup and fours championship final, held at the East of England Arena on 26 July. Unfortunately, the only other success during the decade was winning the pairs championship in 1986, with Doug Wyer and new signing Les Collins.

=== 1990s ===
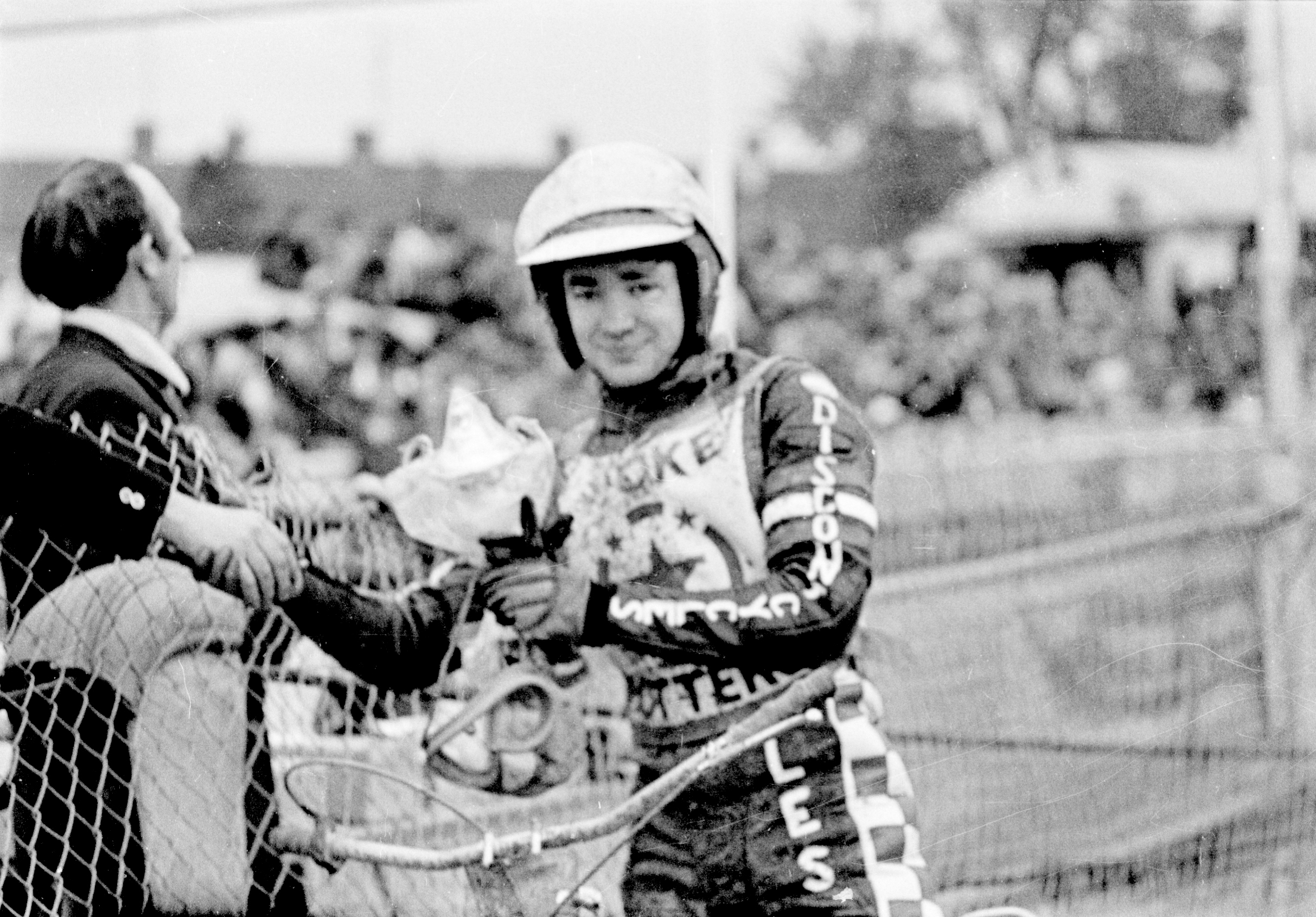
Les Collins

The Monarchs enjoyed a better start of the 1990s with a 4th place finish in 1991 and a third in 1994. In-between the team of Les Collins, Kenny McKinna, Michael Coles and Scott Lamb won the fours championship final, held at the East of England Arena on 25 July.

During the 1995 season, the company operating Powderhall ran into financial difficulty, and the stadium was sold to a housing company for redevelopment. This meant the Monarchs were again evicted. In 1996, the Monarchs' rivals Glasgow Tigers closed down, so with a stadium not in use in Glasgow, and the Monarchs without a home in Edinburgh, the Monarchs' moved to Shawfield Stadium, Glasgow to form the Scottish Monarchs. Many Tigers fans refused to support what they saw as a team of old rivals, and although Monarchs fans initially travelled through to Glasgow, crowd numbers soon fell.

A fresh start arrived in 1997 when the Monarchs left Glasgow after gaining permission to operate at Armadale Stadium. The club signed Peter Carr and retained Kenny McKinna and Robert Eriksson, finishing 3rd in the league.

=== 2000s ===
The Monarchs experienced a period of success, starting by winning the Premier League in 2003 with relative ease. Led by Frede Schött and Peter Carr, the team won with a nine point cushion from Sheffield Tigers.

Another Premier Division title arrived in 2008, which resulted in the Monarchs taking part in the first promotion/relegation play-off when they faced Wolverhampton. Ryan Fisher, Matthew Wethers and William Lawson starred during the season.

=== 2010s ===
Edinburgh secured another Premier League title in the 2010 season, their third in seven years. They later won the Premier League Four-Team Championship, held on 14 July 2013, at the East of England Arena

The 2014 season was Monarchs best season to date, led by Craig Cook and Sam Masters the team won the treble of League, Knockout Cup and League Cup, while going on a 27 match unbeaten run. Masters and Max Fricke also won the Premier Pairs.

The success continued in 2015, when the Monarchs became the first team to win consecutive Premier League titles, by beating the Glasgow Tigers in the Grand Final. The Tigers held a 7-point lead after the first leg at Ashfield, but the Monarchs won 14 of the 15 heats in the second leg at Armadale, winning 99–80 on aggregate. It was one of three titles won by the Monarchs in 2015; in the Premier League Cup, the Monarchs beat the Tigers again, while the quartet of Cook, Masters, Erik Riss and Justin Sedgmen won the Premier League Fours. Changes due to points/averages restrictions resulted in a much quieter period for the team from 2016 to 2019.

=== 2020s ===
Following a season lost to the COVID-19 pandemic, the Monarchs reached the final of the 2021 Knockout Cup and Sam Masters topped the 2022 league averages but issues surrounding their home venue surfaced. However, the team continued to race at Armadale in 2023 and 2024.

== Season summary (1st team) ==
Extended content

Year and league	Position	Notes
1930 Speedway Northern League	8th	rode as the Thistles
1948 Speedway National League Division Two	9th	
1949 Speedway National League Division Two	5th	
1950 Speedway National League Division Two	8th	
1951 Speedway National League Division Two	3rd	
1952 Speedway National League Division Two	6th	
1953 Speedway National League Division Two	5th	
1954 Speedway National League Division Two	N/A	withdrew, results expunged
1960 Provincial Speedway League	8th	
1961 Provincial Speedway League	6th	
1962 Provincial Speedway League	5th	
1963 Provincial Speedway League	8th	
1964 Provincial Speedway League	5th	
1965 British League season	17th	
1966 British League season	12th	
1967 British League season	4th	
1968 British League season	8th	rode as Coatbridge Monarchs
1969 British League season	11th	rode as Coatbridge Monarchs
1977 National League season	15th	
1978 National League season	15th	
1979 National League season	17th	
1980 National League season	5th	
1981 National League season	4th	Knockout Cup, fours
1982 National League season	14th	
1983 National League season	9th	
1984 National League season	16th	
1985 National League season	19th	
1986 National League season	9th	pairs
1987 National League season	10th	
1988 National League season	11th	
1989 National League season	8th	
1990 National League season	13th	
1991 British League Division Two season	4th	
1992 British League Division Two season	7th	
1993 British League Division Two season	5th	fours
1994 British League Division Two season	3rd	
1995 Premier League speedway season	9th	
1996 Premier League speedway season	12th	rodes as the Scottish Monarchs
1997 Premier League speedway season	3rd	Knockout Cup winners
1998 Premier League speedway season	9th	
1999 Premier League speedway season	3rd	Knockout Cup winners
2000 Premier League speedway season	6th	
2001 Premier League speedway season	8th	
2002 Premier League speedway season	9th	
2003 Premier League speedway season	1st	champions
2004 Premier League speedway season	12th	
2005 Premier League speedway season	5th	
2006 Premier League speedway season	12th	
2007 Premier League speedway season	13th	
2008 Premier League speedway season	1st	
2009 Premier League speedway season	2nd	PO winners
2010 Premier League speedway season	1st	PO semi finals
2011 Premier League speedway season	11th	
2012 Premier League speedway season	5th	
2013 Premier League speedway season	4th	fours
2014 Premier League speedway season	1st	champions, Knockout Cup, League Cup, pairs
2015 Premier League speedway season	1st	champions, League Cup, fours
2016 Premier League speedway season	4th	
SGB Championship 2017	3rd	
SGB Championship 2018	6th	
SGB Championship 2019	8th	
SGB Championship 2021	5th	PO semi final
SGB Championship 2022	5th	PO semi final
SGB Championship 2023	6th	PO
SGB Championship 2024	7th	
SGB Championship 2025	4th	PO

== Season summary (juniors) ==
Extended content

Year and league	Position	Notes
2003 Speedway Conference League	N/A	Armadale Devils, Cup semi final
2004 Speedway Conference League	4th	Armadale Dale Devils
2005 Speedway Conference League	5th	Armadale Dale Devils
2021 National Development League speedway season	6th	Armadale Devils
2022 National Development League speedway season	8th	Armadale Devils
2023 National Development League speedway season	5th	Monarchs Academy
2024 National Development League speedway season	4th	Monarchs Academy
2025	2nd	Monarchs Academy

== Previous riders by season ==
Extended content

2006 team

- (Australia) Rusty Harrison
- (Scotland) William Lawson
- (Australia) Matthew Wethers
- (Denmark) Henrik Moller
- (Netherlands) Theo Pijper
- (Scotland) Derek Sneddon
- (Scotland) Sean Stoddart
- (Italy) Daniel Tessari

2007 team

- (Finland) Kai Laukkanen
- (Finland) Kalle Katajisto
- (Australia) Matthew Wethers
- (Czech Republic) George Stancl
- (Italy) Daniele Tessari
- (Scotland) Derek Sneddon
- (Scotland) Andrew Tully

Also Rode

- (United States) Ronnie Correy
- (Netherlands) Theo Pijper
- (Denmark) Henrik Moller

2008 team

- (United States) Ryan Fisher
- (Sweden) Thomas H. Jonasson
- (Australia) Matthew Wethers
- (Scotland) William Lawson
- (Scotland) Derek Sneddon
- (Scotland) Andrew Tully
- (Australia) Aaron Summers

2009 team

- (United States) Ryan Fisher
- (Scotland) Andrew Tully
- (Australia) Matthew Wethers
- (Germany) Kevin Wölbert
- (Australia) Aaron Summers
- (Poland) Michał Rajkowski
- (Finland) Kalle Katajisto

Also rode:

- (Scotland) Sean Stoddart
- (Germany) Max Dilger
- (South Africa) Byron Bekker
- (Sweden) Thomas H. Jonasson

2010 team

- (Germany) Kevin Wölbert
- (United States) Ryan Fisher
- (Finland) Kalle Katajisto
- (Scotland) Andrew Tully
- (Australia) Matthew Wethers
- (Scotland) William Lawson
- (England) Ashley Morris

Also Rode:

- (Scotland) Cal McDade
- (England) Kyle Howarth
- (Hungary) Jozsef Tabaka
- (Germany) Max Dilger
- (Germany) Tobias Busch
- (Australia) Arlo Bugeja

2011 team

- (Germany) Kevin Wölbert
- (Finland) Kalle Katajisto
- (Scotland) Andrew Tully
- (Australia) Matthew Wethers
- (England) Craig Cook
- (England) Kyle Howarth
- (England) Tim Webster

Also rode

- (England) Ashley Morris
- (Australia) Jay Herne
- (England) Lee Dicken

2012 team

- (Scotland) Derek Sneddon
- (Scotland) Andrew Tully
- (Australia) Matthew Wethers
- (England) Craig Cook
- (Netherlands) Theo Pijper
- (Hungary) Jozsef Tabaka
- (Germany) Marcel Helfer

Also Rode

- (England) Charles Wright
- (Australia) Micky Dyer

2013 team

- (Scotland) Derek Sneddon
- (England) Craig Cook
- (Netherlands) Theo Pijper
- (Hungary) Jozsef Tabaka
- (Australia) Max Fricke
- (Denmark) Claus Vissing
- (Australia) Mitchell Davey

Also rode

- (Germany) Marcel Helfer

Signed but failed to obtain necessary paperwork

- (Australia) Sam Masters

2014 team

- (Scotland) Derek Sneddon
- (England) Craig Cook
- (Australia) Max Fricke
- (Australia) Justin Sedgmen
- (Australia) Sam Masters
- (England) Steve Worrall
- (United States) Aaron Fox

2015 team

- (England) Craig Cook
- (Australia) Sam Masters
- (Australia) Justin Sedgmen
- (England) Max Clegg
- (Germany) Kevin Wolbert
- (Australia) Robert Branford
- (Germany) Erik Riss

2016 team

- (Germany) Kevin Wolbert
- (England) Max Clegg
- (Germany) Erik Riss
- (Australia) Sam Masters
- (Germany) Mark Riss
- (United States) Ryan Fisher
- (England) Daniel Bewley

Also rode

- (Australia) Jye Ethridge

2017 team

- (Australia) Sam Masters
- (United States) Ricky Wells
- (Germany) Erik Riss
- (Australia) Josh Pickering
- (England) Max Clegg
- (Germany) Mark Riss
- (Australia) Mitchell Davey

2018 team

- (United States) Ricky Wells
- (Germany) Erik Riss
- (England) Richie Worrall
- (Sweden) Victor Palovaara
- (Australia) Josh Pickering
- (Sweden) Joel Andersson
- (Scotland) William Lawson

Also Rode

- (England) Matt Williamson
- (Argentina) Coty Garcia
- (Germany) Mark Riss
- (United States) Max Ruml
- (England) Max Clegg

2019 team

- (Australia) Sam Masters
- (United States) Ricky Wells
- (Australia) Cameron Heeps
- (Australia) Josh Pickering
- (Scotland) William Lawson
- (England) Connor Coles
- (England) James Sarjeant

Also Rode

- (Australia) Justin Sedgmen
- (Scotland) Luke Ruddick
- (Sweden) Victor Palovaara
- (Sweden) Joel Andersson
- (Australia) Matt Marson

2021 team

- (England) Nathan Greaves
- (England) Drew Kemp
- (Australia) Sam Masters
- (Australia) Josh Pickering
- (England) Anders Rowe
- (Australia) Kye Thomson
- (England) Richie Worrall

2022 team

- (Italy) Michele Paco Castagna
- (Norway) Lasse Fredriksen
- (Australia) Jacob Hook
- (Australia) Sam Masters (C)
- (Australia) Josh Pickering
- (England) James Sarjeant
- (Australia) Kye Thomson

== Notable riders ==
- (New Zealand) Dick Campbell
- (England) Michael Coles
- (England) Les Collins
- (England) Craig Cook
- (Sweden) Robert Eriksson
- (United States) Ryan Fisher
- (Scotland) Bert Harkins
- (Scotland) George Hunter
- (Scotland) Scott Lamb
- (Scotland) Bill Landels
- (Australia) Sam Masters
- (Scotland) William Lawson
- (Scotland) Kenny McKinna
- (Sweden) Bernt Persson
- (Australia) Josh Pickering
- (Australia) Brett Saunders
- (Denmark) Frede Schött
- (Scotland) Doug Templeton
- (Scotland) Willie Templeton
- (England) Dave Trownson
- (England) Chris Turner
- (Australia) Matthew Wethers
- (Germany) Kevin Wölbert
- (Australia) Jack Young

== Team honours ==
- Premier League Champions: 2003, 2008, 2010, 2014, 2015
- Premier Trophy Winners: 2008, 2014, 2015
- Premier League Knockout Cup Winners: 1997, 1999, 2014
- Premier League Four-Team Championship Winners: 1981,1993, 2013, 2015
- Premier League Pairs Championship Winners: 2014
- National League Knockout Cup Winners: 1981
- National League Pairs Winners: 1986
- Scottish Cup Winners: 1951, 1964, 1967, 1968, 1969, 1977, 1984, 1985, 1988, 1989, 1992, 1997, 1999, 2000, 2001, 2002, 2003, 2004, 2006, 2007, 2008, 2010
- Queen's Cup Winners: 1953
- North Shield Winners: 1951

== Individual honours ==
Championships won while an Edinburgh Monarchs rider.

World Championship

- (Australia) Jack Young – 1951 – The first second division rider to become Speedway World Champion

Premier League Riders' Championship

- (England) Peter Carr – 1997
- (England) Craig Cook – 2012

Scottish Championship

- (Australia) Jack Young – 1949, 1950, 1951
- (New Zealand) Dick Campbell – 1952
- (Scotland) Doug Templeton – 1960, 1962
- (Scotland) George Hunter – 1964
- (Scotland) Bill Landels – 1966
- (England) Peter Carr – 1997, 1999, 2000, 2002
- (Scotland) Andrew Tully – 2012
- (England) Craig Cook – 2013
- (Australia) Sam Masters – 2014

Australian champion

- (Australia) Sam Masters – 2017

== See also ==
- Category:Edinburgh Monarchs riders
