= Andrew Tully (speedway rider) =

British speedway rider (born 1987)

- Born: 26 May 1987 (age 39); Douglas, Isle of Man
- Nationality: British

Career history
- 2004–2012: Edinburgh/Armadale
- 2006–2007: Scunthorpe
- 2008, 2009: Peterborough Panthers
- 2013: Newcastle Diamonds
- 2013: Belle Vue Aces
- 2013: Birmingham Brummies

Andrew Bruce Tully (born 26 May 1987) is a former British motorcycle speedway rider.

== Speedway career ==
Tully rode in the top tier of British speedway riding for the Peterborough Panthers during the 2009 Elite League speedway season.

Tully began his British career riding for Armadale Dale Devils during the 2004 Speedway Conference League season and rode for parent club Edinburgh Monarchs until 2012.

Tully reached the final of the 2010 British Speedway Championship. His final season was in 2013, when he rode for Newcastle Diamonds.
