= Workington Comets =

Speedway club based in Cumbria, UK

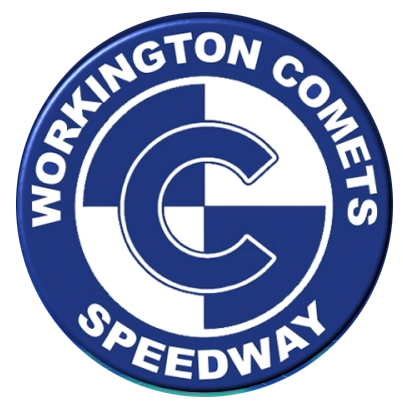

Club information
- Track address: GT Tyres Arena; Northside Speedway; Workington; Cumbria
- Country: England
- Founded: 1970, 2022
- Closed: 2018
- Promoter: Andrew Bain/Steve Lawson
- Team manager: James Denham
- Team captain: Troy Batchelor
- League: SGB Championship
- Website: Official Website

Club facts
- Colours: Blue and White
- Track size: 302 metres
- Track record time: 55.6
- Track record date: 20 April 2024
- Track record holder: Craig Cook

Current team
Rider	CMA
(Australia) Troy Batchelor (capt)
(Denmark) Jonas Jeppesen
(Australia) Tate Zischke
(England) Craig Cook
(Denmark) Niklas Holm Jakobsen
(England) Vinnie Foord
(England) Jamie Etherington

Major team honours
tier 2 League champions	2018
tier 2 Knockout Cup winners	2018
tier 2 Pairs champions	1999, 2000, 2001, 2003, 2008, 2012
tier 2 Fours champions	2001, 2004, 2006, 2008, 2009
Young Shield	2008, 2009, 2010
Challenge Shield Winners	2018

The Workington Comets are a British motorcycle speedway club, based in Workington, Cumbria based at the Northside Speedway track (known as the GT Tyres Arena for sponsorship purposes). The team previously operated from 1970 to 2018 and were based at Derwent Park Stadium. They re-opened in 2022, competing during the 2023 National Development League speedway season.

== History ==
=== 1970s ===
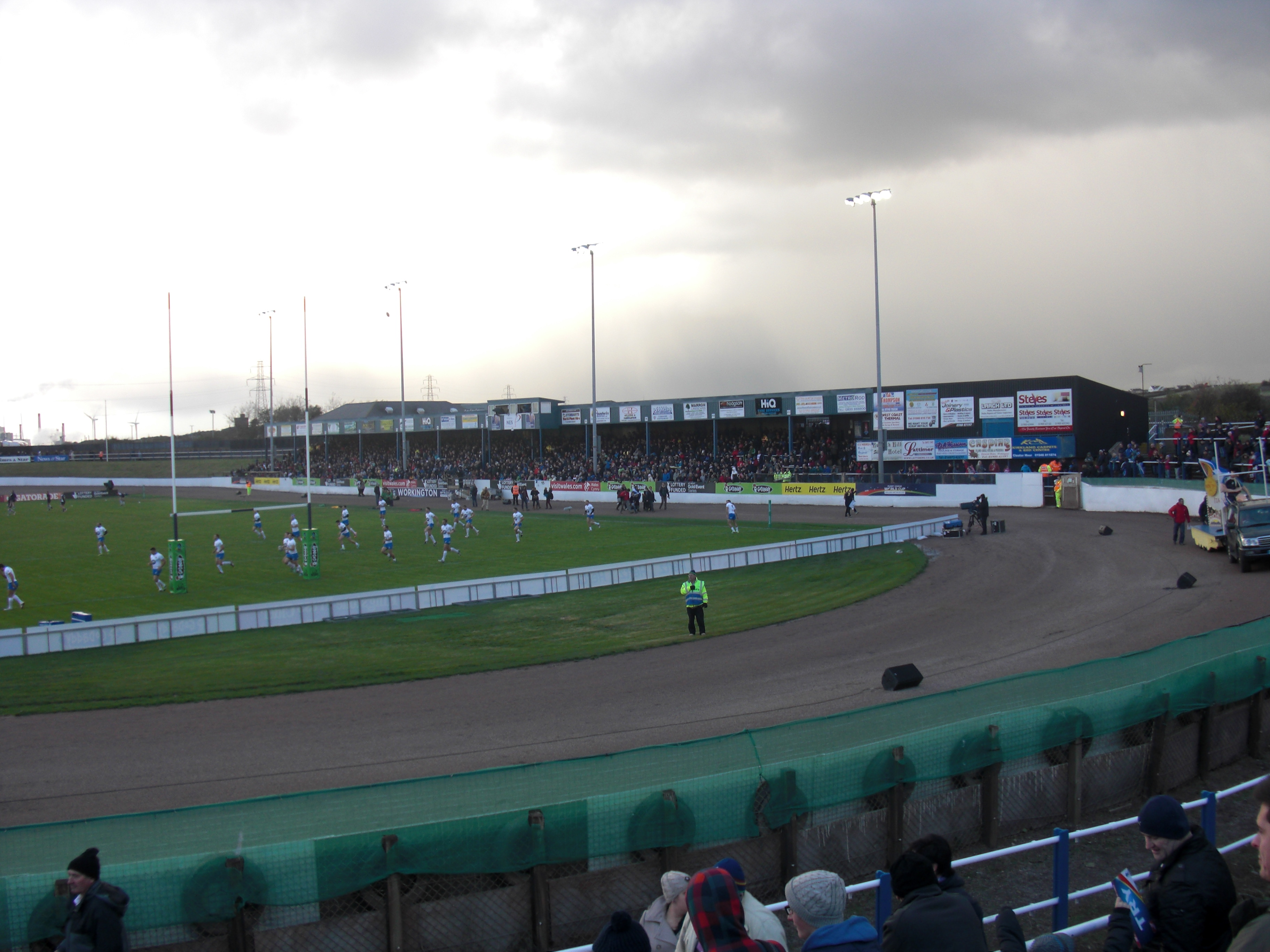
Derwent Park, Workington's first home

Speedway began in Workington after a successful application was made by the promotion team for a licence to race at Derwent Park for the 1970 season. The promoters were Ian Thomas and Jeff Brownhut and the rugby pitch required moving 25 yards sideways to accommodate the speedway track.

The team's inaugural league season was the 1970 British League Division Two season and the opening fixture was held on 3 April against Berwick Bandits in a Border Trophy match. The team finished the season in 11th place.

The 1973 season resulted in the team finishing runner-up to Boston Barracudas, a season which saw number 1 rider Lou Sansom top the league averages with an average of 10.56. After a third place finish in 1976, the Comets struggled near the foot of the table from 1977 to 1979.

=== 1980s ===
The new decade resulted in even worse results, the Comets lost 36 of their 38 matches in 1980 and only fared a little better in 1981. This led to the teams' withdrawal from the league just before the start of the 1982 season.

Speedway returned to Derwent Park in 1987, when Glasgow Tigers arrived to race, while searching for a new home. However the team changed its name to Workington Tigers soon afterwards but held their last fixture against Stoke on 31 July. The team's results were expunged. It was the last season of speedway at Workington for twelve years.

=== Return & 2000s ===
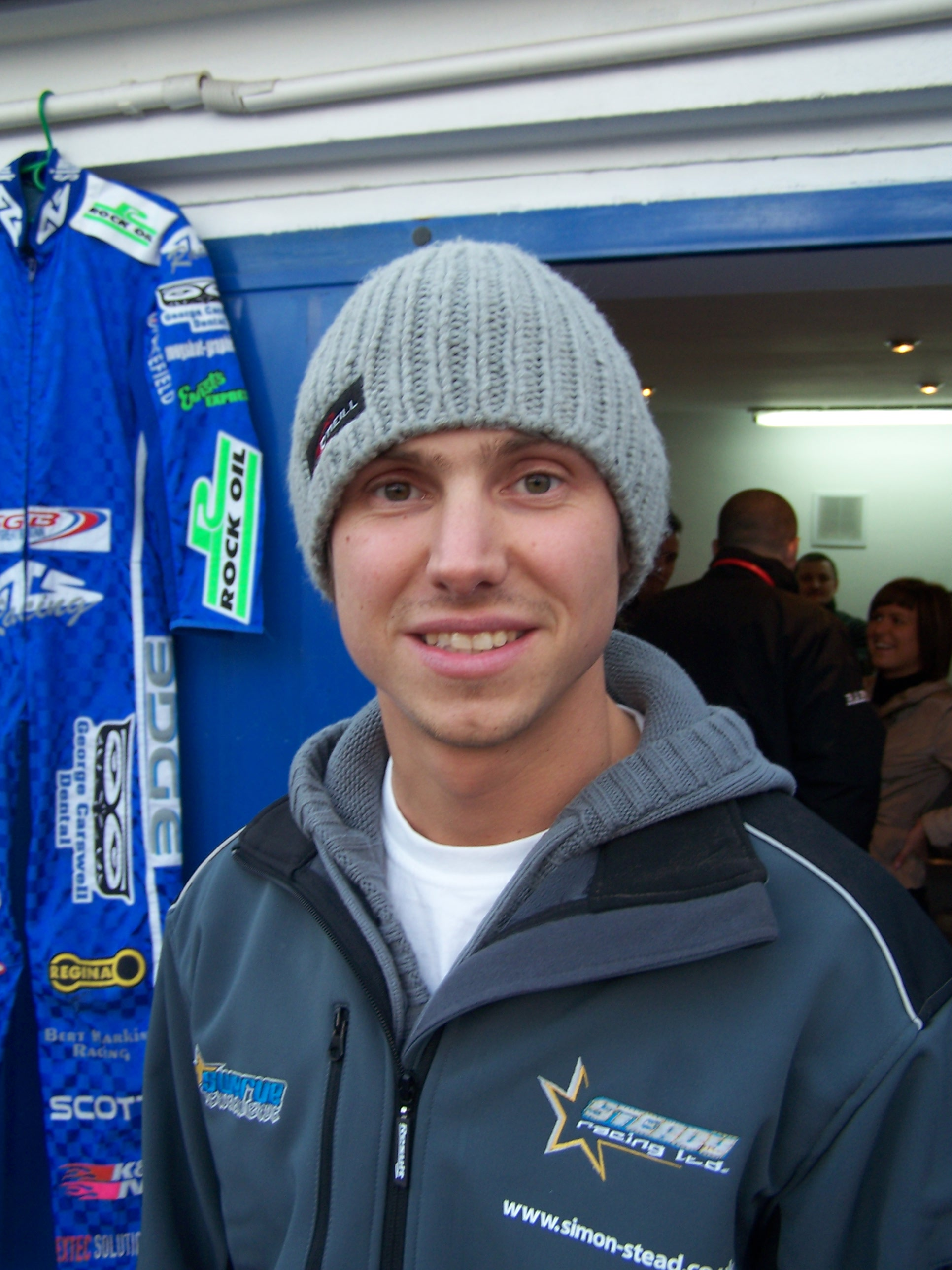
Simon Stead, pairs and fours winner

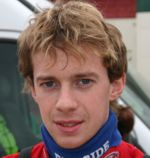
James Wright, 2007 Riders' champion

The Comets returned in 1999, when Ian Thomas, together with Tony Mole brought back the team to race in the Premier League (division 2). They also made a star signing by recruiting Carl Stonehewer, who with Brent Werner won the Premier League Pairs Championship.

Stonehewer was not only Workington's top rider but was the stand out rider in the Premier League, winning the Riders' Championship in 2000 and 2001, the pairs in 2000, 2001 and 2003 and the Premier League Four-Team Championship in 2001 and 2004. James Wright replaced Stonehewer in 2006 but continued to help Workington win trophies by leading the team to the fours title again. Wright then won the Riders' Championship in 2007. The following season in 2008, the Comets won the Young Shield, pairs and fours and in 2009, there were Young Shield and fours successes. The return of speedway in Workington had provided a golden era.

Off the track and at the end of the 2007 season, the club had been sold by promoter Tony Mole to businessman Keith Denham.

=== 2010s ===
Despite several team changes taking place in 2010, the Comets won a third consecutive Young Shield and two seasons later in 2012 won the pairs, courtesy of Adam Roynon and René Bach. Craig Cook topped the league averages in 2017.

In October 2018, the Comets won the SGB Championship for the first time in their history. In the same month, the Comets completed a treble with Knockout Cup and Championship Shield victories. Despite such a successful season, it was announced in January 2019 that the Comets were withdrawing from the SGB Championship for financial reasons.

=== 2020s ===
In 2021, the return of speedway to Workington was announced, with the previous Northside training track in the town being redeveloped for league racing. The team, under the control of local businessman Andrew Bain, were set to enter the 2022 National League but a series of vandalism incidents at the circuit pushed this back a year. Having received permission to use the 'Comets' nickname, the club returned to action for the 2023 National Development League speedway season. Following their successful return in 2023, they announced that for the 2024 season they would move up a division and duly competed in the SGB Championship.

== Notable riders ==
- (Denmark) René Bach
- (England) Neil Collins
- (England) Craig Cook
- (Australia) Rusty Harrison
- (Sweden) Peter Ingvar Karlsson
- (Sweden) Daniel Nermark
- (Finland) Kauko Nieminen
- (Wales) Taffy Owen
- (Australia) Mick Powell
- (England) Adam Roynon
- (Australia) Lou Sansom
- (England) Simon Stead
- (England) Carl Stonehewer
- (United States) Brent Werner
- (England) James Wright

== Season summary ==
Extended content

Year and league	Position	Notes
1970 British League Division Two season	11th	
1971 British League Division Two season	15th	
1972 British League Division Two season	7th	
1973 British League Division Two season	2nd	
1974 British League Division Two season	4th	
1975 New National League season	6th	
1976 National League season	3rd	
1977 National League season	16th	
1978 National League season	14th	
1979 National League season	15th	
1980 National League season	20th	
1981 National League season	19th	
1987 National League season	N/A	withdrew, results expunged
1999 Premier League speedway season	11th	
2000 Premier League speedway season	5th	
2001 Premier League speedway season	6th	
2002 Premier League speedway season	15th	
2003 Premier League speedway season	9th	
2004 Premier League speedway season	2nd	
2005 Premier League speedway season	7th	
2006 Premier League speedway season	7th	
2007 Premier League speedway season	7th	
2008 Premier League speedway season	5th	Young Shield, Premier League Pairs & Fours
2009 Premier League speedway season	7th	Young Shield
2010 Premier League speedway season	6th	Young Shield
2011 Premier League speedway season	4th	
2012 Premier League speedway season	4th	
2013 Premier League speedway season	5th	
2014 Premier League speedway season	6th	
2015 Premier League speedway season	8th	
2016 Premier League speedway season	7th	
SGB Championship 2017	8th	
SGB Championship 2018	3rd	Champions (won PO) & Knockout Cup winners
SGB Championship 2024	4th	
SGB Championship 2025	7th	

== Honours ==
SGB Championship

- Winners: 2018

SGB Championship Knockout Cup

- Winners: 2018

SGB Championship Shield

- Winners: 2018

Young Shield

- Winners: 2008, 2009, 2010

Premier League Four-Team Championship
Winners: 2001, 2004, 2006, 2008, 2009

Premier League Riders Championship

- 2000 Carl Stonehewer
- 2001 Carl Stonehewer
- 2007 James Wright

Premier League Pairs Championship

- 1999 Carl Stonehewer with Brent Werner
- 2000 Carl Stonehewer with Mick Powell
- 2001 Carl Stonehewer with Peter I. Karlsson
- 2003 Carl Stonehewer with Simon Stead
- 2008 Kauko Nieminen with Daniel Nermark
- 2012 René Bach with Adam Roynon
