= Armadale Stadium =

Race track in Scotland

Coordinates: 55°53′54″N 3°40′59″W

- Location: Armadale, West Lothian EH48 2PD
- Opened: 1939

Tenants
- Edinburgh Monarchs speedway

Armadale Stadium is a motorcycle speedway and former greyhound racing stadium situated in the town of Armadale, West Lothian in Scotland. Stock car racing has also been held at the venue.

== Speedway ==
It has been home to the Edinburgh Monarchs speedway team since 1997.

In 2009, the Edinburgh Monarchs reached an agreement with Sainsbury's for the stadium to be purchased and re-developed as a supermarket, subject to planning permission being granted by West Lothian Council. This was not forthcoming, the application being rejected in June 2010.

The speedway track at Armadale has a unique feature whereby the start and finish lines are staggered. Until 2013, the start/finish line was on what is now the back straight. In 2013, the start line was moved to the current home straight, and was in the same position as the finish line. During the 2013 season there were a number of frightening first bend bunching incidents, and the decision was taken to move the start line back by approximately 5 metres to give more time for the riders to settle into the first bend safely. The finish line remained in the same position as it currently is, so there was a greater opportunity for passing on the run to the line off the final bend.

== Greyhound racing ==
The greyhound track near Bathgate Road opened on 20 February 1939 just four days after the Armadale greyhound track at Volunteer Park closed. In later years two races called the West Lothian Stakes and Armadale Sprint Championships were introduced and remained feature races. Track distances were 330 and 540 yards. Armadale was mainly handicap races and there were regular opens for the higher class of greyhound with a main distance of 525 yards. TD Heffernan was involved in opening of the new track.

The owners of Armadale greyhound stadium announced on 8 October 2016 that they were ending the greyhound operation.
