= 2016 Australian Individual Speedway Championship =

Motorcycle racing competition

Seasons
- ← 2015 2017 →

The 2016 Individual Speedway Australian Championship is a Motorcycle speedway competition organised by Motorcycling Australia (MA) for the Australian Solo Championship.

The four round series were held between 2 January and 10 January.

The rounds were held at the Loxford Park Speedway in Kurri Kurri on 2 January, Undera Park Speedway in Undera on 6 January, Gillman Speedway in Adelaide on 8 January, with the fourth and final round to be held at the Olympic Park Speedway in Mildura on 10 January.

== Qualification ==
Nine riders were originally seeded to the four round series by Motorcycling Australia. They were:

- Troy Batchelor (SA)
- Mason Campton (NSW)
- Max Fricke (Vic)
- Josh Grajczonek (Qld)
- Sam Masters (NSW)
- Nick Morris (Qld)
- Tyron Proctor (Vic)
- Justin Sedgmen (Vic)
- Rohan Tungate (NSW)

Unfortunately, 2013 national champion and former Speedway Grand Prix rider Troy Batchelor was forced to withdraw before the series got under way. Brady Kurtz won the qualifying round held on New Year's Day at Loxford Park after being tied on 12 points with Jordan Stewart. Jack Holder finished third on 11 points. Also qualifying for the series was Kieran Sproule, Brodie Waters, Alan McDonald, Josh Pickering and Cooper Riordan.

== Loxford Park ==
- Round one
- 2 January
- Kurri Kurri, New South Wales - Loxford Park Speedway
- Referee: Gavin Willson
- Top 3 riders to "A" Final, riders 4–7 to "B" Final
- "B" Final winner to "A" Final

Pos.	Rider	Points	Details
1	Rohan Tungate	18	
2	Sam Masters	15	
3	Max Fricke	15	
4	Brady Kurtz	11	
5	Mason Campton	10	
6	Justin Sedgmen	10	
7	Jack Holder	9	
8	Nick Morris	9	
9	Josh Grajczonek	7	
10	Tyron Proctor	6	
11	Jack Holder	6	
12	Jordan Stewart	6	
13	Cooper Riordan	4	
14	Josh Pickering	3	
15	Brodie Waters	3	
16	Alan McDonald	2	
17	Kieran Sproule	2	

=== Loxford Park "B" Final ===
1 - Brady Kurtz
2 - Jack Holder
3 - Justin Sedgmen
4 - Mason Campton

=== Loxford Park "A" Final ===
1 - Rohan Tungate
2 - Sam Masters
3 - Max Fricke
4 - Brady Kurtz

== Undera Park ==
- Round two
- 6 January
- (Victoria (state)) Undera, Victoria - Undera Park Speedway
- Referee: Gavin Willson
- Top 3 riders to "A" Final, riders 4–7 to "B" Final
- "B" Final winner to "A" Final

Pos.	Rider	Points	Details
1	Brady Kurtz	14	
2	Nick Morris	13	
3	Mason Campton	12	
4	Sam Masters	11	
5	Max Fricke	11	
6	Jack Holder	11	
7	Brodie Waters	9	
8	Rohan Tungate	8	
9	Jordan Stewart	7	
10	Josh McDonald	4	
11	Alan McDonald	4	
12	Tyron Proctor	4	
13	Justin Sedgmen	3	
14	Josh Pickering	3	
15	Cooper Riordan	1	
16	Kieran Sproule	0	
17	Kieran Sproule	0	

=== Undera Park "B" Final ===
1 - Sam Masters
2 - Max Fricke
3 - Jack Holder
4 - Brodie Waters

=== Undera Park "A" Final ===
1 - Nick Morris
2 - Mason Campton
3 - Sam Masters
X - Brady Kurtz

== Gillman ==
- Round three
- 8 January
- Adelaide, South Australia - Gillman Speedway
- Referee: Gavin Willson
- Top 3 riders to "A" Final, riders 4–7 to "B" Final
- "B" Final winner to "A" Final

Pos.	Rider	Points	Details
1	Brady Kurtz	13	
2	Justin Sedgmen	13	
3	Rohan Tungate	11	
4	Sam Masters	11	
5	Jack Holder	11	
6	Max Fricke	11	
7	Nick Morris	11	
8	Tyron Proctor	9	
9	Brodie Waters	6	
10	Josh Pickering	5	
11	Mason Campton	5	
12	Kieran Sproule	4	
13	Alan McDonald	4	
14	Jordan Stewart	4	
15	Cooper Riordan	2	
16	Josh McDonald	0	

=== Gillman "B" Final ===
1 - Sam Masters
2 - Nick Morris
3 - Jack Holder
4 - Max Fricke

=== Gillman "A" Final ===
1 - Brady Kurtz
2 - Rohan Tungate
3 - Justin Sedgmen
4 - Sam Masters

== Olympic Park ==
- Round four
- 10 January
- (Victoria (state)) Mildura, Victoria - Olympic Park Speedway
- Referee: Gavin Willson
- Top 3 riders to "A" Final, riders 4–7 to "B" Final
- "B" Final winner to "A" Final

Pos.	Rider	Points	Details
1	Justin Sedgmen	14	
2	Max Fricke	12	
3	Sam Masters	12	
4	Rohan Tungate	11	
5	Brady Kurtz	11	
6	Jack Holder	11	
7	Nick Morris	11	
8	Tyron Proctor	9	
9	Mason Campton	6	
10	Jordan Stewart	4	
11	Josh Pickering	5	
12	Brodie Waters	5	
13	Alan McDonald	3	
14	Kieran Sproule	3	
15	Josh McDonald	1	
16	Dakota Ballantyne	0	
17	Jack Fallon	0	

=== Olympic Park "B" Final ===
1 - Brady Kurtz
2 - Nick Morris
3 - Jack Holder
fx - Rohan Tungate

=== Olympic Park "A" Final ===
1 - Justin Sedgmen
2 - Max Fricke
3 - Sam Masters
X - Brady Kurtz

== Intermediate classification ==
Pos.	Rider	Points
Gold	Brady Kurtz	55
Silver	Sam Masters	54
Bronze	Max Fricke	52
4	Rohan Tungate	51
5	Nick Morris	48
6	Justin Sedgmen	46
7	Jack Holder	42
8	Mason Campton	36
9	Tyron Proctor	28
10	Brodie Waters	23
10	Jordan Stewart	23
12	Josh Pickering	16
13	Alan McDonald	13
14	Kieran Sproule	9
15	Josh Grajczonek	7
15	Cooper Riordan	7
17	Josh McDonald	5
NC	Dakota Ballantyne	0
NC	Jack Fallon	0

== See also ==
- Australian Individual Speedway Championship
- Australia national speedway team
- Sports in Australia
