= 2014 Australian Individual Speedway Championship =

Australian motorcycle speedway event

Seasons
- ← 2013 2015 →

The 2014 Individual Speedway Australian Championship was a Motorcycle speedway competition organised by Motorcycling Australia for the Australian Solo Championship.

The three final rounds took place between 4 January and 11 January. The championship was won by 2012 World Champion Chris Holder who won his 5th Australian title. Jason Doyle finished in second place with Josh Grajczonek in third.

The rounds were held at the Loxford Park Speedway on 4 January, Undera Park Speedway on 8 January, with the final round held at Adelaide's Gillman Speedway on 11 January.

== Qualification ==
- Qualification
- 3 January
- Kurri Kurri, New South Wales - Loxford Park Speedway
- Referee:
- Qualification: the top 9 riders to the Australian Championship

Pos.	Rider	Points	Details
1	Sam Masters	13	(3,1,3,3,3)
2	Tyson Nelson	13	(3,3,2,2,3)
3	Mason Campton	11	(2,3,3,3,x)
4	Justin Sedgmen	11	(1,3,3,1,3)
5	Max Fricke	11	(2,2,2,3,2)
6	Kurt Shields	10	(3,t,1,3,3)
7	Jake Anderson	8	(1,3,2,1,1)
8	Daine Stevens	8	(2,2,1,2,1)
9	Matthew Day	7	(0,1,3,2,1)
10	Tyson Snow	7	(3,1,0,1,2)
11	Jake Allen	6	(2,2,0,2,x)
12	Joe Ringwood	6	(1,1,2,0,2)
13	Jye Etheridge	5	(x,2,1,t,2)
14	Hunter Anderson	3	(0,t,1,1,1)
15	Brodie Waters	1	(1,0,0,0,x)
16	Joshue McDonald	0	(x,0,0,r,-)

== Finals ==
Eight riders were seeded through to the finals:

- Troy Batchelor
- Jason Doyle
- Josh Grajczonek
- Chris Holder
- Jack Holder
- Dakota North
- Rohan Tungate
- Cameron Woodward

== Loxford Park ==
- Round one
- 3 January
- Kurri Kurri, New South Wales - Loxford Park Speedway
- Referee:
- Top 3 riders to "A" Final, riders 4–7 to "B" Final
- "B" Final winner to "A" Final

Pos.	Rider	Points	Details
1	Jason Doyle	14	(2,3,3,3,3)
2	Cameron Woodward	13	(3,1,3,3,3)
3	Troy Batchelor	12	(2,3,3,1,3)
4	Josh Grajczonek	12	(3,3,2,2,2)
5	Chris Holder	11	(2,2,2,3,2)
6	Jack Holder	9	(3,0,3,1,2)
7	Sam Masters	9	(3,2,1,2,1)
8	Max Fricke	9	(1,1,2,2,3)
9	Rohan Tungate	8	(1,2,2,3,r)
10	Justin Sedgmen	7	(2,1,1,2,1)
11	Mason Campton	6	(1,3,1,0,1)
12	Jake Anderson	3	(0,0,0,1,2)
13	Dakota North	3	(0,2,1,f,0)
14	Tyson Nelson	3	(1,0,0,1,1)
15	Kurt Shields	1	(0,1,0,f,0)
16	Daine Stevens	0	(0,0,0,0,0)

=== Loxford Park "B" Final ===
1 - Chris Holder
2 - Josh Grajczonek
3 - Jack Holder
4 - Sam Masters

=== Loxford Park "A" Final ===
1 - Jason Doyle
2 - Chris Holder
3 - Cameron Woodward
4 - Troy Batchelor

== Undera Park ==
- Round two
- 8 January
- (Victoria (state)) Undera, Victoria - Undera Park Speedway
- Referee:
- Top 3 riders to "A" Final, riders 4–7 to "B" Final
- "B" Final winner to "A" Final

Pos.	Rider	Points	Details
1	Troy Batchelor	14	(3,2,3,3,3)
2	Jason Doyle	13	(3,3,3,2,2)
3	Justin Sedgmen	11	(3,3,1,3,1)
4	Dakota North	10	(2,2,3,1,2)
5	Chris Holder	9	(x,1,2,3,3)
6	Josh Grajczonek	9	(3,2,3,0,1)
7	Rohan Tungate	9	(1,3,2,3,0)
8	Cameron Woodward	8	(1,3,t,2,2)
9	Mason Campton	8	(2,1,1,1,3)
10	Sam Masters	8	(2,2,1,2,1)
11	Max Fricke	7	(2,0,0,2,3)
12	Jake Anderson	5	(1,0,2,0,2)
13	Tyson Nelson	3	(r,1,2,f,0)
14	Daine Stevens	2	(1,1,0,0,0)
15	Kurt Shields	2	(0,0,t,1,1)
16	Jack Holder	1	(0,0,f,1,f)

=== Undera Park "B" Final ===
1 - Chris Holder
2 - Dakota North
3 - Josh Grajczonek
4 - Rohan Tungate

=== Undera Park "A" Final ===
1 - Chris Holder
2 - Jason Doyle
3 - Justin Sedgmen
4 - Troy Batchelor (fx)

== Gillman ==
- Round three
- 11 January
- Gillman, South Australia - Gillman Speedway
- Referee:
- Top 3 riders to "A" Final, riders 4–7 to "B" Final
- "B" Final winner to "A" Final

Pos.	Rider	Points	Details
1	Jason Doyle	15	(3,3,3,3,3)
2	Rohan Tungate	13	(3,2,2,3,3)
3	Chris Holder	11	(3,1,3,2,2)
4	Mason Campton	10	(2,2,3,1,2)
5	Josh Grajczonek	10	(3,3,3,0,1)
6	Max Fricke	10	(1,3,1,3,2)
7	Justin Sedgmen	9	(2,3,2,2,0)
8	Cameron Woodward	9	(2,2,2,0,3)
9	Sam Masters	7	(0,0,1,3,3)
10	Dakota North	7	(2,1,1,2,1)
11	Jack Holder	6	(1,2,2,1,0)
12	Tyson Nelson	5	(1,t,0,2,2)
13	Jake Anderson	5	(1,1,1,1,1)
14	Matthew Day	1	(0,0,1,0,0)
15	Daine Stevens	1	(0,1,0,0,0)
16	Kurt Shields	0	(0,t,0,0,-)

=== Gillman "B" Final ===
1 - Mason Campton
2 - Josh Grajczonek
3 - Justin Sedgmen
4 - Max Fricke

=== Gillman "A" Final ===
1 - Rohan Tungate
2 - Chris Holder
3 - Mason Campton
4 - Jason Doyle (fx)

== Intermediate Classification ==
Pos.	Rider	Points	LOX	UND	GIL
Gold	Chris Holder	56	18	20	18
Silver	Jason Doyle	54	20	18	16
Bronze	Josh Grajczonek	44	15	14	15
4	Rohan Tungate	44	11	12	20
5	Cameron Woodward	41	17	12	12
6	Justin Sedgmen	41	10	17	14
7	Mason Campton	37	9	11	17
8	Sam Masters	34	13	10	11
9	Max Fricke	34	12	9	13
10	Troy Batchelor	32	16	16	-
11	Dakota North	31	6	15	10
12	Jack Holder	25	14	2	9
13	Jake Anderson	20	7	7	6
14	Tyson Nelson	17	4	6	7
15	Daine Stevens	9	2	4	3
16	Kurt Shields	8	3	3	2
17	Matthew Day	4	-	-	4

== See also ==
- Australian Individual Speedway Championship
- Australia national speedway team
- Sports in Australia
