= 2013 Australian Individual Speedway Championship =

Australian motorcycle speedway championship

The 2013 Australian Individual Speedway Championship was a motorcycle speedway competition organised by Motorcycling Australia (MA) for the Australian Individual Speedway Championship. The event was held over three rounds.

Troy Batchelor won his first championship.

== Rounds ==
Round	Date	Venue	Winner
1	5 January	Gillman Speedway, Adelaide	Troy Batchelor
2	9 January	Undera Park Speedway, Undera	Troy Batchelor
3	12 January	Loxford Park Speedway, Kurri Kurri	Troy Batchelor

== Final classification ==
Pos.	Rider	Total
Gold	Troy Batchelor	60
Silver	Dakota North	48
Bronze	Cameron Woodward	47
4	Rohan Tungate	43+3
5	Jason Doyle	43+2
6	Davey Watt	39
7	Alex Davies	34
8	Michael Dyer	33
9	Josh Grajczonek	31
10	Justin Sedgmen	31
11	Sam Masters	30
12	Mark Lemon	30
13	Ty Proctor	30
14	Adam Shields	13
15	Kozza Smith	10
16	Cameron Heeps	7
17	Todd Kurtz	1

== See also ==
- Australian Individual Speedway Championship
- Australia national speedway team
- Sports in Australia
