= 2017 Australian Individual Speedway Championship =

Motorcycle racing competition

The 2017 Individual Speedway Australian Championship is a Motorcycle speedway competition organised by Motorcycling Australia (MA) for the Australian Solo Championship.

The four round series will be held between 4 January and 14 January.

The rounds are scheduled for Gillman Speedway in Adelaide on 4 January, Olympic Park Speedway in Mildura on 7 January, Undera Park Speedway in Undera on 11 January, with the fourth and final round to be held at the Loxford Park Speedway in Kurri Kurri on 14 January.

== Qualification ==
The 16 riders announced by Motorcycling Australia were:

- Brady Kurtz (NSW) - Defending champion
- Troy Batchelor (SA)
- Mason Campton (NSW)
- Max Fricke (Vic)
- Jack Holder (NSW)
- Todd Kurtz (NSW)
- Jaimon Lidsey (Vic)
- Sam Masters (NSW)
- Nick Morris (Qld)
- Josh Pickering (NSW)
- Tyron Proctor (Vic)
- Cooper Riordan (Vic)
- Justin Sedgmen (Vic)
- Jordan Stewart (Vic)
- Rohan Tungate (NSW)
- Davey Watt (Qld)

The reserves for the series were announced as: James Davies (Vic), Matthew Gilmore (NSW), Dakota Ballantyne (SA) and Alan McDonald (NSW).

== Points System ==
Points are standard scoring in Motorcycle speedway of 3 (1st), 2 (2nd), 1 (3rd), 0 (4th) per heat race. A bonus point is added for each position in the "A" Final (meaning even 4th gets a point unless a DNF or exclusion) and no points are scored in the "B" Final. The maximum number of points possible per rider in a single round is 19.

== Gillman ==
- Round one
- 4 January
- Adelaide, South Australia - Gillman Speedway
- Referee: Ivan Golding
- Top 3 riders to "A" Final, riders 4–7 to "B" Final
- "B" Final winner to "A" Final

Pos.	Rider	Points	Heat Details
1	Davey Watt	17	(3-3-3-3-1+4)
2	Justin Sedgmen	17	(3-2-3-3-3+3)
3	Troy Batchelor	12	(3-1-1-3-2+2)
4	Nick Morris	14	(2-3-3-2-3+1)
5	Sam Masters	10	(2-3-R-3-2)
6	Rohan Tungate	10	(1-2-3-1-3)
7	Max Fricke	9	(0-2-2-2-3)
8	Tyron Proctor	6	(3-0-1-1-1)
9	Jack Holder	6	(2-1-2-0-1)
10	Jaimon Lidsey	5	(0-3-0-2-0)
11	Todd Kurtz	5	(2-1-0-2-0)
12	Brady Kurtz	5	(1-2-2-0-0)
13	Josh Pickering	5	(1-1-1-0-2)
14	Cooper Riordan	4	(0-0-2-0-2)
15	Mason Campton	3	(1-0-0-1-1)
16	Jordan Stewart	2	(0-X-1-1-0)

=== Gillman "B" Final ===
1 - Troy Batchelor
2 - Rohan Tungate
3 - Max Fricke
e - Sam Masters

=== Gillman "A" Final ===
1 - Davey Watt
2 - Justin Sedgmen
3 - Troy Batchelor
4 - Nick Morris

== Olympic Park ==
- Round two
- 7 January
- (Victoria (state)) Mildura, Victoria - Olympic Park Speedway
- Referee: Brendon Gledhill
- Top 3 riders to "A" Final, riders 4–7 to "B" Final
- "B" Final winner to "A" Final

Pos.	Rider	Points	Heat Details
1	Sam Masters	16	(3-3-3-3-0+4)
2	Max Fricke	16	(3-1-3-3-3+3)
3	Davey Watt	15	(3-3-2-3-2+2)
4	Justin Sedgmen	12	(X-3-3-3-3+X)
5	Brady Kurtz	10	(1-3-1-2-3)
6	Nick Morris	8	(2-1-3-2-X)
7	Troy Batchelor	8	(3-X-2-1-2)
8	Josh Pickering	8	(1-2-1-2-2)
9	Jack Holder	7	(2-2-0-0-3)
10	Jaimon Lidsey	7	(1-2-2-2-0)
11	Tyron Proctor	5	(0-2-1-1-1)
12	Jordan Stewart	4	(2-0-X-0-2)
13	Todd Kurtz	4	(0-1-2-0-1)
14	Mason Campton	4	(0-1-1-1-1)
15	Rohan Tungate	3	(1-R-R-1-1)
16	Cooper Riordan	2	(2-0-0-0-0)

=== Olympic Park "B" Final ===
1 - Justin Sedgmen
2 - Brady Kurtz
3 - Nick Morris
4 - Troy Batchelor

=== Olympic Park "A" Final ===
1 - Sam Masters
2 - Max Fricke
3 - Davey Watt
fx - Justin Sedgmen

== Undera Park ==
- Round three
- 11 January
- (Victoria (state)) Undera, Victoria - Undera Park Speedway
- Referee: Lyal Allan
- Top 3 riders to "A" Final, riders 4–7 to "B" Final
- "B" Final winner to "A" Final

Pos.	Rider	Points	Heat Details
1	Justin Sedgmen	17	(3-3-3-3-1+4)
2	Sam Masters	17	(2-3-3-3-3+3)
3	Max Fricke	14	(3-3-3-1-2+2)
4	Troy Batchelor	15	(3-3-2-3-3+1)
5	Jack Holder	10	(3-2-2-3-0)
6	Brady Kurtz	10	(2-1-3-2-2)
7	Nick Morris	9	(1-2-2-2-2)
8	Davey Watt	7	(1-2-1-X-3)
8	Jordan Stewart	7	(2-1-1-2-1)
10	Rohan Tungate	6	(X-X-2-1-3)
11	Mason Campton	5	(1-2-0-0-2)
12	Tyron Proctor	4	(2-1-0-1-R)
12	Jaimon Lidsey	4	(1-0-0-2-1)
14	Josh Pickering	2	(0-1-1-0-0)
14	Todd Kurtz	2	(0-0-1-0-1)
16	Cooper Riordan	1	(0-0-0-1-0)

=== Undera Park "B" Final ===
1 - Max Fricke
2 - Jack Holder
r - Brady Kurtz
fx - Nick Morris

=== Undera Park "A" Final ===
1 - Justin Sedgmen
2 - Sam Masters
3 - Max Fricke
4 - Troy Batchelor

== Loxford Park ==
- Round four
- 14 January
- Kurri Kurri, New South Wales - Loxford Park Speedway
- Referee: David Mills
- Top 3 riders to "A" Final, riders 4–7 to "B" Final
- "B" Final winner to "A" Final

Pos.	Rider	Points	Heat Details
1	Brady Kurtz	17	(2-3-2-3-3+4)
2	Nick Morris	12	(1-3-1-1-3+3)
3	Troy Batchelor	14	(3-2-2-2-3+2)
4	Sam Masters	15	(3-3-3-3-2+1)
5	Rohan Tungate	11	(3-1-3-3-1)
6	Davey Watt	11	(3-2-2-2-2)
7	Justin Sedgmen	9	(2-2-1-2-2)
8	Max Fricke	8	(R-1-3-1-3)
8	Mason Campton	8	(2-3-1-1-1)
10	Todd Kurtz	6	(2-1-2-0-1)
11	Tyron Proctor	6	(1-2-1-0-2)
12	Jaimon Lidsey	4	(0-0-0-3-1)
12	Jack Holder	3	(0-0-3-R-R)
14	Jordan Stewart	2	(0-0-0-2-0)
14	Josh Pickering	2	(1-1-0-0-0)
16	Cooper Riordan	2	(1-0-0-1-0)

=== Loxford Park "B" Final ===
1 - Nick Morris
2 - Justin Sedgmen
3 - Rohan Tungate
4 - Davey Watt

=== Loxford Park "A" Final ===
1 - Brady Kurtz
2 - Nick Morris
3 - Troy Batchelor
4 - Sam Masters

== Intermediate classification ==
Pos.	Rider	Gil	Mil	Und	Lox	Points
Gold	Sam Masters	10	16	17	15	58
Silver	Justin Sedgmen	17	12	17	9	55
Bronze	Davey Watt	17	15	7	11	50
4	Troy Batchelor	12	8	15	14	49
5	Max Fricke	9	16	14	8	47
6	Nick Morris	14	8	9	12	43
7	Brady Kurtz	5	10	10	17	42
8	Rohan Tungate	10	3	6	11	30
9	Jack Holder	6	7	10	3	26
10	Tyron Proctor	6	5	4	7	22
11	Mason Campton	3	4	5	8	20
11	Jaimon Lidsey	5	7	4	3	19
13	Todd Kurtz	5	4	2	6	17
13	Josh Pickering	5	8	2	2	17
15	Jordan Stewart	2	4	7	2	15
16	Cooper Riordan	4	2	1	2	9

- The top 8 riders are automatically seeded to the 2018 Australian Individual Speedway Championship.

== See also ==
- Australian Individual Speedway Championship
- Australia national speedway team
- Sports in Australia
