= 2015 Australian Individual Speedway Championship =

Motorcycle racing competition

Seasons
- ← 2014 2016 →

The 2015 Individual Speedway Australian Championship is a Motorcycle speedway competition organised by Motorcycling Australia (MA) for the Australian Solo Championship.

The four round series were held between 3 January and 10 January. In a change to the series points system, riders will score points from the "A" Finals which will count towards their overall series total. A Final points are: 4 points (1st), 3 points (2nd), 2 points (3rd) and 1 point (4th).

The rounds were held at the Gillman Speedway in Adelaide on 3 January, Olympic Park Speedway in Mildura on 5 January, Undera Park Speedway in Undera on 7 January, with the fourth and final round to be held at the Loxford Park Speedway in Kurri Kurri on 10 January.

== Qualification ==
Due to a number of injuries, the official qualifying round to be held at Gillman on 2 January (the day before the championship officially began) was cancelled. This led to MA selecting 16 riders to contest the championship rounds.

The 16 riders seeded through to the finals were:

- Jake Allen (Qld)
- Josh Coyne (Qld)
- Jason Doyle (NSW)
- Jack Fallon (Vic)
- Max Fricke (Vic)
- Josh Grajczonek (Qld)
- Chris Holder (NSW)
- Jack Holder (NSW)
- Sam Masters (NSW)
- Tyson Nelson (Qld)
- Dakota North (Vic)
- Joe Ringwood (NSW)
- Justin Sedgmen (Vic)
- Kieran Sproule (NSW)
- Rohan Tungate (NSW)
- Brodie Waters (Vic)

The reserves were announced as Jordan Stewart (Vic), Cooper Riordan (Vic) and Brady Webb (WA)

== Gillman ==
- Round one
- 3 January
- Adelaide, South Australia - Gillman Speedway
- Referee:
- Top 3 riders to "A" Final, riders 4–7 to "B" Final
- "B" Final winner to "A" Final

Pos.	Rider	Points	Details
1	Jason Doyle	14	(2,3,3,3,3)
2	Rohan Tungate	14	(3,3,3,3,2)
3	Dakota North	13	(3,2,2,3,3)
4	Josh Grajczonek	11	(2,2,3,3,1)
5	Justin Sedgmen	11	(2,3,3,2,1)
6	Max Fricke	10	(3,1,2,1,3)
7	Chris Holder	8	(2,0,1,2,3)
8	Tyson Nelson	8	(3,1,1,2,1)
9	Sam Masters	8	(1,2,2,1,2)
10	Jake Allen	6	(1,3,f,2,0)
11	Jack Holder	6	(1,1,2,f,2)
12	Kieran Sproule	3	(0,0,1,r,2)
13	Brodie Waters	3	(0,0,1,1,1)
14	Joe Ringwood	2	(0,2,0,0,0)
15	Jack Fallon	2	(1,1,0,r,0)
16	Josh Coyne	1	(0,0,0,1,0)
R1	Jordan Stewart	-	Did Not Ride
R2	Brady Webb	-	Did Not Ride

=== Gillman "B" Final ===
1 - Justin Sedgmen
2 - Max Fricke
3 - Chris Holder
4 - Josh Grajczonek

=== Gillman "A" Final ===
1 - Jason Doyle
2 - Justin Sedgmen
3 - Rohan Tungate
4 - Dakota North

== Olympic Park ==
- Round two
- 5 January
- (Victoria (state)) Mildura, Victoria - Olympic Park Speedway
- Referee:
- Top 3 riders to "A" Final, riders 4–7 to "B" Final
- "B" Final winner to "A" Final

Pos.	Rider	Points	Details
1	Jason Doyle	13	(3,3,3,1,3)
2	Justin Sedgmen	12	(3,1,2,3,3)
3	Chris Holder	12	(2,2,3,2,3)
4	Josh Grajczonek	10	(2,2,3,0,3)
5	Tyson Nelson	10	(3,3,2,x,2)
6	Sam Masters	10	(1,3,1,3,2)
7	Max Fricke	10	(2,3,2,1,2)
8	Jack Holder	9	(2,1,2,2,2)
9	Dakota North	8	(3,1,1,2,1)
10	Rohan Tungate	6	(x,x,3,3,x)
11	Jake Allen	5	(0,0,1,3,1)
12	Brodie Waters	5	(0,2,0,2,1)
13	Joe Ringwood	3	(1,0,0,1,1)
14	Kieran Sproule	2	(0,2,0,0,0)
15	Josh Coyne	2	(x,0,1,1,0)
16	Jack Fallon	1	(1,x,x,0,x)
R1	Jordan Stewart	1	()
R2	Brady Webb	0	()

=== Olympic Park "B" Final ===
1 - Tyson Nelson
2 - Josh Grajczonek
3 - Max Fricke
4 - Sam Masters

=== Olympic Park "A" Final ===
1 - Jason Doyle
2 - Chris Holder
3 - Justin Sedgmen
4 - Tyson Nelson

== Undera Park ==
- Round three
- 7 January
- (Victoria (state)) Undera, Victoria - Undera Park Speedway
- Referee:
- Top 3 riders to "A" Final, riders 4–7 to "B" Final
- "B" Final winner to "A" Final

Pos.	Rider	Points	Details
1	Jason Doyle	14	(3,2,3,3,3)
2	Max Fricke	14	(2,3,3,3,3)
3	Sam Masters	14	(3,3,3,3,2)
4	Dakota North	12	(3,3,3,2,1)
5	Tyson Nelson	11	(2,3,2,1,3)
6	Rohan Tungate	9	(x,2,2,2,3)
7	Justin Sedgmen	9	(2,1,1,3,2)
8	Josh Grajczonek	8	(1,1,2,2,2)
9	Josh Coyne	6	(0,2,2,1,1)
10	Brodie Waters	6	(1,2,0,1,2)
11	Kieran Sproule	5	(3,1,1,0,0)
12	Jack Fallon	5	(2,0,0,2,1)
13	Jordan Stewart	2	(1,1,0,0,0)
14	Jake Allen	2	(x,0,1,0,1)
15	Brady Webb	1	(0,0,0,1,0)
16	Joe Ringwood	1	(x,0,1,0,x)
R1	Cooper Riordan	0	()

=== Undera Park "B" Final ===
1 - Dakota North
2 - Rohan Tungate
Fx - Tyson Nelson
X - Justin Sedgmen

=== Undera Park "A" Final ===
1 - Sam Masters
2 - Max Fricke
3 - Jason Doyle
4 - Dakota North

== Loxford Park ==
- Round four
- 10 January
- Kurri Kurri, New South Wales - Loxford Park Speedway
- Referee:
- Top 3 riders to "A" Final, riders 4–7 to "B" Final
- "B" Final winner to "A" Final

Pos.	Rider	Points	Details
1	Jason Doyle	14	
2	Rohan Tungate	13	
3	Sam Masters	13	
4	Justin Sedgmen	11	
5	Max Fricke	11	
6	Dakota North	11	
7	Jack Holder	9	
8	Josh Grajczonek	8	
9	Tyson Nelson	8	
10	Kieran Sproule	5	
11	Jake Allen	5	
12	Jack Fallon	4	
13	Joe Ringwood	3	
14	Brodie Waters	3	
15	Josh Coyne	1	
16	Jordan Stewart	1	
R1	Brady Webb	0	
R2	Cooper Riordan	0	

=== Loxford Park "B" Final ===
1 - Dakota North
2 - Jack Holder
3 - Justin Sedgmen
x - Max Fricke

=== Loxford Park "A" Final ===
1 - Jason Doyle
2 - Sam Masters
3 - Rohan Tungate
4 - Dakota North

== Intermediate classification ==
Pos.	Rider	Points	GIL	OLY	UND	LOX
Gold	Jason Doyle	69	18	17	16	18
Silver	Sam Masters	52	8	10	18	16
Bronze	Justin Sedgmen (Note: Justin Sedgmen was ranked ahead of Max Fricke, by virtue of better A and B final results.)	48	14	14	9	11
4	Max Fricke	48	10	10	17	11
5	Dakota North	47	14	8	13	12
6	Rohan Tungate	46	16	6	9	15
7	Tyson Nelson	38	8	11	11	8
8	Josh Grajczonek	37	11	10	8	8
9	Jack Holder	24	6	9	-	9
10	Chris Holder	23	8	15	-	-
11	Jake Allen	18	6	5	2	6
12	Brodie Waters	17	3	5	6	3
13	Kieran Sproule	15	3	2	5	5
14	Jack Fallon	12	2	1	5	4
15	Josh Coyne	10	1	2	6	1
16	Joe Ringwood	9	2	3	1	3
17	Jordan Stewart	4	-	1	2	1
18	Brady Webb	1	-	0	1	-
19	Cooper Riordan	0	-	-	0	-

== See also ==
- Australian Individual Speedway Championship
- Australia national speedway team
- Sports in Australia
