= 2018 Australian Individual Speedway Championship =

Australian motorcycle speedway championship

The 2018 Australian Individual Speedway Championship was a motorcycle speedway competition organised by Motorcycling Australia (MA) for the Australian Individual Speedway Championship. The event was held over four rounds.

Rohan Tungate won his first championship.

== Rounds ==
| Round | Date | Venue | Winner |
|---|---|---|---|
| 1 | 6 January | Loxford Park Speedway, Kurri Kurri | Rohan Tungate |
| 2 | 10 January | Undera Park Speedway, Undera | Rohan Tungate |
| 3 | 12 January | Olympic Park, Mildura | Jack Holder |
| 4 | 14 January | Gillman Speedway, Adelaide | Rohan Tungate |

== Final classification ==
| Pos. | Rider | LOX | UND | OLY | GIL | Total |
|---|---|---|---|---|---|---|
| Gold | Rohan Tungate | 18 | 17 | 10 | 18 | 63 |
| Silver | Brady Kurtz | 12 | 15 | 18 | 15 | 60 |
| Bronze | Max Fricke | 15 | 11 | 12 | 15 | 53 |
| 4 | Jack Holder | 9 | 10 | 17 | 15 | 51 |
| 5 | Mason Campton | 10 | 8 | 12 | 9 | 39 |
| 6 | Sam Masters | 7 | 16 | 14 | 0 | 37 |
| 7 | Josh Pickering | 14 | 6 | 8 | 9 | 37 |
| 8 | Jordan Stewart | 7 | 9 | 9 | 10 | 35 |
| 9 | Jaimon Lidsey | 11 | 4 | 6 | 10 | 31 |
| 10 | Jye Etheridge | 5 | 8 | 8 | 7 | 28 |
| 11 | Matthew Gilmore | 6 | 8 | 2 | 5 | 21 |
| 12 | Cooper Riordan | 3 | 6 | 5 | 6 | 20 |
| 13 | Robert Medson | 5 | 4 | 3 | 4 | 16 |
| 14 | Joel Coyne | 4 | 2 | 2 | 2 | 10 |
| 15 | Declan Knowles | 2 | 3 | 3 | 1 | 9 |
| 16 | James Davies | 1 | 2 | 1 | 0 | 4 |
| 17 | Josh Coyne | - | - | - | 3 | 3 |
| 18 | Brandon McGuinness | - | - | - | 2 | 2 |

== See also ==
- Australian Individual Speedway Championship
- Australia national speedway team
- Sports in Australia
