= Gillman Speedway =

Motorcycle speedway in Gillman, Australia

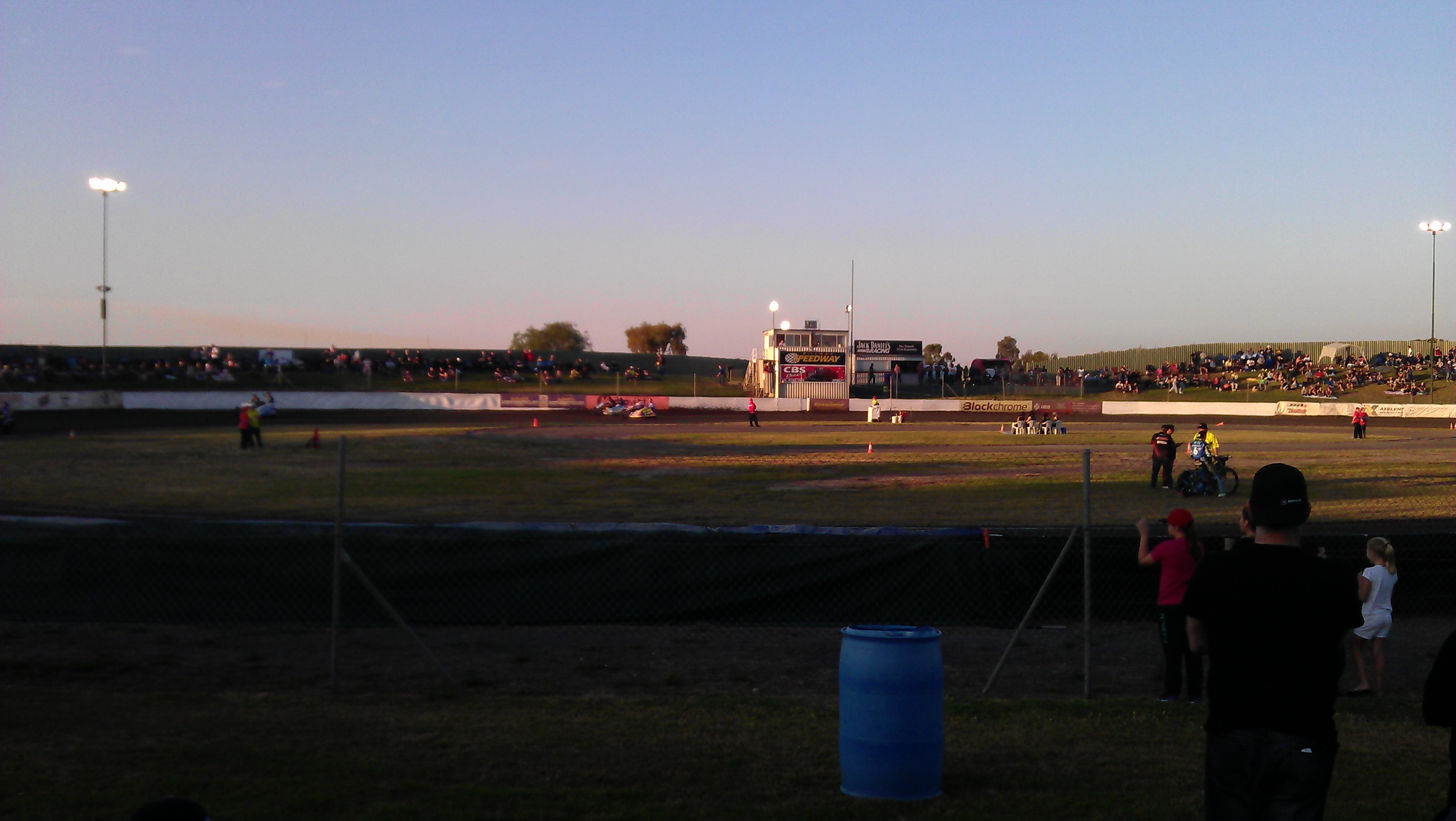
- Location: 65 Wilkins Road, Gillman, South Australia 5013
- Coordinates: 34°50′13″S 138°32′14″E
- Capacity: 8,000
- Operator: Speedway Riders' Association of South Australia Inc.
- Broke ground: 1997
- Opened: 16 May 1998
- Major events: Australian Solo Championship; Australian Speedway Sidecar Championship; Australian Under-21 Championship; South Australian Solo Championship; South Australian Sidecar Championship; Jack Young Solo Cup; Harry Denton Memorial Shield; Gillman Solo Championship

Speedway
- Surface: Dolomite, crushed granite and clay mix
- Length: 0.186 mi (0.300 km)
- Race lap record: 0:54.06 (4 laps clutch start) (Justin Sedgmen, 2017, Motorcycle speedway)

Junior Speedway Track
- Surface: Dolomite, crushed granite and clay mix
- Length: 0.069 mi (0.111 km)
- Race lap record: 0:41.55 (4 laps clutch start) (Max Fricke, 2011, 125cc Junior Solo)

Gillman Speedway (sometimes called Gillman Speedway Stadium) is a purpose built, 300 metres (330 yards) long motorcycle speedway located in the Adelaide suburb of Gillman in South Australia. The track opened in 1998 and runs approximately 13 meetings per season from October to March/April.

Gillman Speedway is currently managed and promoted by former Sidecar racer David Parker.

== History ==
The sudden and forced closure of the North Arm Speedway at the end of the 1996–97 season left Adelaide without a weekly operating venue for motorcycle speedway for the first time in almost 80 years. North Arm was located on land owned by the Government of South Australia and the land was reclaimed in mid-1997. David Parker, the President of the Speedway Riders' Association of South Australia and Motorcycling SA President Ivan Golding inspected many sites for a new speedway before settling on the Heini Becker Park Motorsport Complex at Gillman, adjacent to the Heini Becker Motocross track and only 2 km from where North Arm was located. The only equipment they had to start building the new venue was an old water truck, an old Gallion Grader and a Massey Ferguson tractor (which is still going, whereas the other machinery has since died and been replaced).

Gillman Speedway, located on what was the car park of the motocross track, held its first official practice on Sunday, 19 October 1997 on a small 213 metres (233 yards) track formed using Dolomite from the old North Arm track. The track ran north–south with the start line located approximately where turns 1 and 2 for solos now stand, and held regular monthly practice meetings while a larger 400 metres (440 yards) dirt track was constructed (running east–west). The original safety fence of the 213-metre track consisted of used car tyres (painted white) stacked three high. After monthly practice meetings were held on the larger track, the first meeting was held on 16 May 1998.

Meetings were held at the circuit for the next two years while continued improvements were carried out. Temporary lights were installed in November 1999, and on 7 January 2000 the first meeting under lights was held which was the South Australian Solo Championship, won by Adelaide rider Nigel Sadler.

Over the winter during 2000, the Speedway Riders' Association of SA Inc. was given financial help and also had the volunteer manpower help of the local riders and their family and friends. This allowed the Association to level both existing tracks and to build the international standard track that is in use to this day.

The current 300-metre track is 13 metres wide on the straights and 15 metres on corners with slight camber. The surface is a dolomite, crushed granite and clay mix, while the Safety fence is constructed of 1.2-metre high rubber belting, suspended on high tensile wire strands. The speedway has eight 15-metre high light poles with each having three x 2000 watt metal halide lights. The referee's and commentary box, located at the start/finish line, is fitted with an FIM type control panel. Terraced and banked spectator areas surround the track with the exception of the back straight where the pits are located. The land in front of the pits has been deliberately left flat to allow the future building of a grandstand when funds permit. Currently this area is used as a viewing area for those in the pits. Gillman Speedway also boasts a VIP area located on the outside of turn 3 (turn 2 for the sidecars) where up to 50 people can watch the racing from an elevated position overlooking the track.

The track opened on Australia Day (26 January) 2001 with the staging of the Jack Young Solo Cup and the Harry Denton Memorial Shield for Sidecars. Leigh Adams, who had previously won the cup at North Arm in 1994 and 1997, won his third Jack Young Cup from Adelaide's own Shane Parker and Mildura's Travis McGowan (Adams would win the cup again in 2002 and 2003). Townsville's Garry Moon and Chris Hughes won the Harry Denton Shield from then Australian Champions Glenn and Nathan O'Brien from Perth, with the local team of Justin and Mark Plaisted finishing third.

During its first season of operation, Gillman also played host to the 2001 Australian Under-21 Solo Championship won by Adelaide rider Rusty Harrison. After the success of the meeting, Gillman again hosted the Under-21 Championship in 2002, with Travis McGowan taking out his third and last U/21 title.

Since its opening and with constant improvements to the venue including spectator terracing and a covered and paved pit area, Gillman has been regarded as one of the premier motorcycle speedways in Australia. Since 2005 the speedway has held at least one round of the Australian Solo Championship, including the final round of the championship in 2009, 2012 and 2014, and the opening round in 2006, 2010 and 2013. Gillman also held the Australian Sidecar Championship in 2008, 2011, and 2013. Gillman also hosted the Australian Under-21 Solo Championship on 2001, 2002, 2006, 2007 and 2014.

On 11 May 2011 it was announced that Gillman Speedway would hold the third and final round of the 2011/12 Australian Solo Championship on 21 January 2012. The championship saw Chris Holder from New South Wales unbeaten to claim his 4th Australian Championship in 5 years. Later in the year Holder joined Lionel Van Praag (1936), Bluey Wilkinson (1938), Jack Young (1951 and 1952), and Jason Crump (2004, 2006 and 2009) to become Australia's 5th Speedway World Champion when he won the 2012 Speedway Grand Prix series.

Nine days later on 20 May 2011 it was announced that Gillman Speedway would hold the final round of the new 13 round 2011/12 Speedway Sidecar Grand Slam, The series, the first of its kind in Australia for Sidecars, starts on 14 October at the Pioneer Park Speedway in Ayr, Queensland will be headlined by five times Australian champions Glenn O’Brien from Western Australia and Darrin Treloar from New South Wales as well as current World Champions Mick Headland and Paul Waters. The provisional date for the final at Gillman Speedway was 7 April 2012.

In August 2015, the long planned open-air (no roof) grandstand for the back straight was finally completed. The stand, which is located directly in front of the pits, has a seating capacity of 216. Speedway management also announced that Gillman would host the FIM Speedway Sidecar World Cup on 26 March 2016.

On 7 November 2015, Gillman Speedway hosted a benefit meeting for injured Australian rider Darcy Ward with all the money made at the gate (plus more from the auction of items such as helmets signed by MotoGP riders Valentino Rossi and Jorge Lorenzo) going to Ward to help with his medical costs. A crowd of 1,933 was in attendance to see Chris Holder take out the solo final from Troy Batchelor and the surprise of the meeting, young German rider Kai Huckenback. During the night Holder also swapped two wheels for three and did 4 laps on the back of Mark Plaisted's 1000cc sidecar. Reigning Australian sidecar champions Justin Plaisted and Sam Harrison took out the sidecar final from Mick and Jesse Headland with Trent Headland / Daz Whetstone finishing third. The meeting raised over $40,000 for the Darcy Ward Rehabilitation Fund.

The current 4 lap record at Gillman is 54.06 seconds set on 3 January 2017 by Victorian rider Justin Sedgmen. The 4 lap Sidecar record is held by Trent Headland (SA) and Darryl Whetstone (Great Britain) with a time of 56.36 seconds set on 16 April 2017.

== Air Fence ==
To increase the safety of the riders, the Speedway Riders Association installed an Air Fence through turns one and two and three and four at Gillman Speedway by the start of the 2011–12 season. The Speedway Safety System Airfence, the most up-to-date and safest Speedway fence that is manufactured, consists of sixty six 3 x 1.2 panels that are 75 centimetres thick. Each panel consists of a foam frame and reinforced PVC cover. The Air Fence was installed at a cost in excess of A$100,000 with the money raised by the Speedway Riders' Association through sponsorship packages.

The Air Fence fund also received a donation from Sweden's six time Speedway World Champion Tony Rickardsson after he visited the venue and said "this is how Speedway should be".

== Junior Track ==
In 2006 a Junior track was built on the infield of the main track to encourage junior development, and was opened on 21 October by legendary Rowley Park Speedway promoter, the late Kym Bonython. It is the second junior track in operation in Adelaide after the Sidewinders Speedway opened in 1978 and is still in operation as of 2016.

Other distinguished guests on the night included six time World Champion Ivan Mauger (who gave a demonstration ride on the main track at age 67, and was only 7 seconds slower over 4 laps than then track record holder Leigh Adams), former captain and later manager of the English and Great Britain, the late Nigel Boocock, twice Australian and nine time South Australian champion from the 1960s and 70's John Boulger, South Australian speedway legend Bill Wigzell, who although more known for driving Speedcars and the purple #88 Super Modified "Suddenly", actually got his on track start in speedway as a Solo rider at Adelaide's old Kilburn Speedway in the late 1940s after initially being a Speedcar mechanic. The former flagman/Clerk of Course at Rowley Park, as well as the Australian Grand Prix in Adelaide, Glen Dix, was also a guest.

Like its big brother, the 111 metres (121 yards) long junior track is a dolomite, crushed granite and clay mix. The junior track has no safety fence, although the shortest run-off area is 17 metres giving riders ample time to stop or turn before hitting the fence on the main track.

Victorian rider Max Fricke, the 2016 Under-21 World Champion, currently holds the 4 lap record on the junior track with a time of 41.55 seconds set on 22 January 2011. The 4 lap junior sidecar record is held by NSW pair Shane Hudson and Sam Gilbert with a time of 42.46 seconds set on 22 March 2011.

== Track Information ==
=== Main Track ===
Length – 300 metres (330 yards), 1 metre out from the pole line
Width – 13 metres (straights), 15 metres (turns)
Banking – slight camber
Surface – Dolomite, crushed granite, clay mix
Safety Fence – 1.2-metre high rubber belting, suspended on high tensile wire strands. The latest and safest Speedway fence, the Airfence Speedway Safety System, installed in front of the existing fence on the corners in November 2011
Lighting: – 24 x 2000 watt metal halide on eight 15-metre poles
Referees Box – Fitted with an F.I.M. type Control panel.

=== Junior Track ===
Length – 111 metres (121 yards), 1 metre out from the pole line
Surface – Dolomite, crushed granite, clay mix
Safety Fence – No safety fence.

== World Sidecar Championship ==
Year	Winners	Runner-up	3rd place
2016	AUS Darrin Treloar & Blake Cox	AUS Trent Headland & ENG Daz Whetstone	AUS Mick Headland & Jesse Headland
2017	AUS Warren Monson & Andrew Summerhayes	AUS Darrin Treloar & Blake Cox	NZL Andrew Buchanan & AUS Denny Cox
2018	AUS Darrin Treloar & Jesse Headland	AUS Mark Mitchell & Tony Carter	NZL Andrew Buchanan & AUS Denny Cox
2019	AUS Warren Monson & Andrew Summerhayes	AUS Mark Plaisted & Ben Pitt	AUS Darrin Treloar & Blake Cox

== Gillman Solo Championship ==
Since 2003, Gillman Speedway has staged the Gillman Solo Championship run for both Division 1 and Division 2 riders. The meeting is staged in the traditional single meeting format with semi-finals and a final. The championship was not run in 2006, 2007 and 2008.

Results shown for the Division 1 championship.

Year	Winner	Runner-up	3rd place
2003	Kevin Doolan (Vic)	Matthew Weathers (SA)	Ford Keane (SA)
2004	Kevin Doolan (Vic)	Cory Gathercole (Vic)	Mark Jones (Vic)
2005	Brett Woodifield (SA)	Trevor Harding (WA)	Tom Headley (Vic)
2006	Not Held		
2007	Not Held		
2008	Not Held		
2009	Tyron Proctor (Vic)	Robert Ksiezak (SA)	Frank Smart (WA)
2010	Sam Martin (SA)	Robert Branford (SA)	Ben Turner (SA)
Year	Winner	Runner-up	3rd place
2011	Nigel Sadler (SA)	Brenton Barnfield (SA)	Robert Medson (SA)
2012	Sam Martin (SA)	Robert Ksiezak (SA)	Arlo Bugeja (SA)
2013	Shane Parker (SA)	Robert Branford (SA)	Max Fricke (Vic)
2014	Shane Parker (SA)	Justin Sedgmen (Vic)	Max Fricke (Vic)
2015	Justin Sedgmen (Vic)	Brodie Waters (Vic)	Robert Branford (SA)
2016	Robert Branford (SA)	Tyron Proctor (Vic)	Arlo Bugeja (SA)
2017	Dakota Ballantyne (Vic)	Robert Medson (SA)	Arlo Bugeja (SA)

== Australian Championships ==
=== Australian Solo Championship ===
- 2005 – Round 4 (Victoria (state)) Leigh Adams (series winner – Leigh Adams)
- 2006 – Round 1 (Victoria (state)) Leigh Adams (series winner – Leigh Adams)
- 2007 – Round 4 (Victoria (state)) Leigh Adams (series winner – Jason Crump)
- 2008 – Round 2 (New South Wales) Chris Holder (series winner – Chris Holder)
- 2009 – Round 3 (Victoria (state)) Leigh Adams (series winner – Leigh Adams)
- 2010 – Round 1 (Queensland) Troy Batchelor (series winner – Chris Holder)
- 2011 – Round 2 (Queensland) Davey Watt (series winner – Chris Holder)
- 2012 – Round 4 (New South Wales) Chris Holder (series winner – Chris Holder)
- 2013 – Round 1 (Queensland) Troy Batchelor (series winner – Troy Batchelor)
- 2014 – Round 3 (New South Wales) Rohan Tungate (series winner – Chris Holder)
- 2015 – Round 1 (New South Wales) Jason Doyle (series winner – Jason Doyle)
- 2016 – Round 3 (New South Wales) Brady Kurtz (series winner – Brady Kurtz)
- 2017 – Round 1 (Queensland) Troy Batchelor (series winner – Sam Masters)
- 2018 – Round 4 TBD (series winner – TBD)

=== Australian Under-21 Championship ===
- 2001 – (South Australia) Rusty Harrison
- 2002 – (Victoria (state)) Travis McGowan
- 2006 – (New South Wales) Chris Holder
- 2007 – (New South Wales) Chris Holder
- 2014 – (Victoria (state)) Max Fricke
- 2016 – (New South Wales) Jack Holder

=== Australian Sidecar Championship ===
- 2008 – (New South Wales) Darrin Treloar / (South Australia) Justin Plaisted
- 2011 – (Western Australia) Glenn O'Brien / (Western Australia) Aaron Maynard
- 2013 – (New South Wales) Darrin Treloar / (Victoria (state)) Simon Cohrs
- 2017 – (South Australia) Trent Headland / (United Kingdom) Darryl Whetstone

== Lap Records ==
as of April 2017
300 metres (330 yards) track

- Solo (4 laps clutch start): 0:54.06 – Justin Sedgmen ( (Victoria (state)) ), 3 January 2017
- Sidecar (4 laps clutch start): 0:56.36 – Trent Headland ( (South Australia) ) / Darryl Whetstone ( (United Kingdom) ), 16 April 2017

111 metres (121 yards) Junior Track

- 125cc Junior Solo (4 Laps clutch start): 0:41.55 – Max Fricke ( (Victoria (state)) ), 22 January 2011
- 250cc Junior Sidecar (4 Laps clutch start): 0:42.46 – Shane Hudson ( (New South Wales) ) / Sam Gilbert ( (New South Wales) ), 26 March 2011

== See also ==
- Motorsport in Australia
- Motorcycle speedway
- Sidecar speedway
