= Australian Under-21 Individual Speedway Championship =

Motorcycle speedway championship

Australian U21 Championship
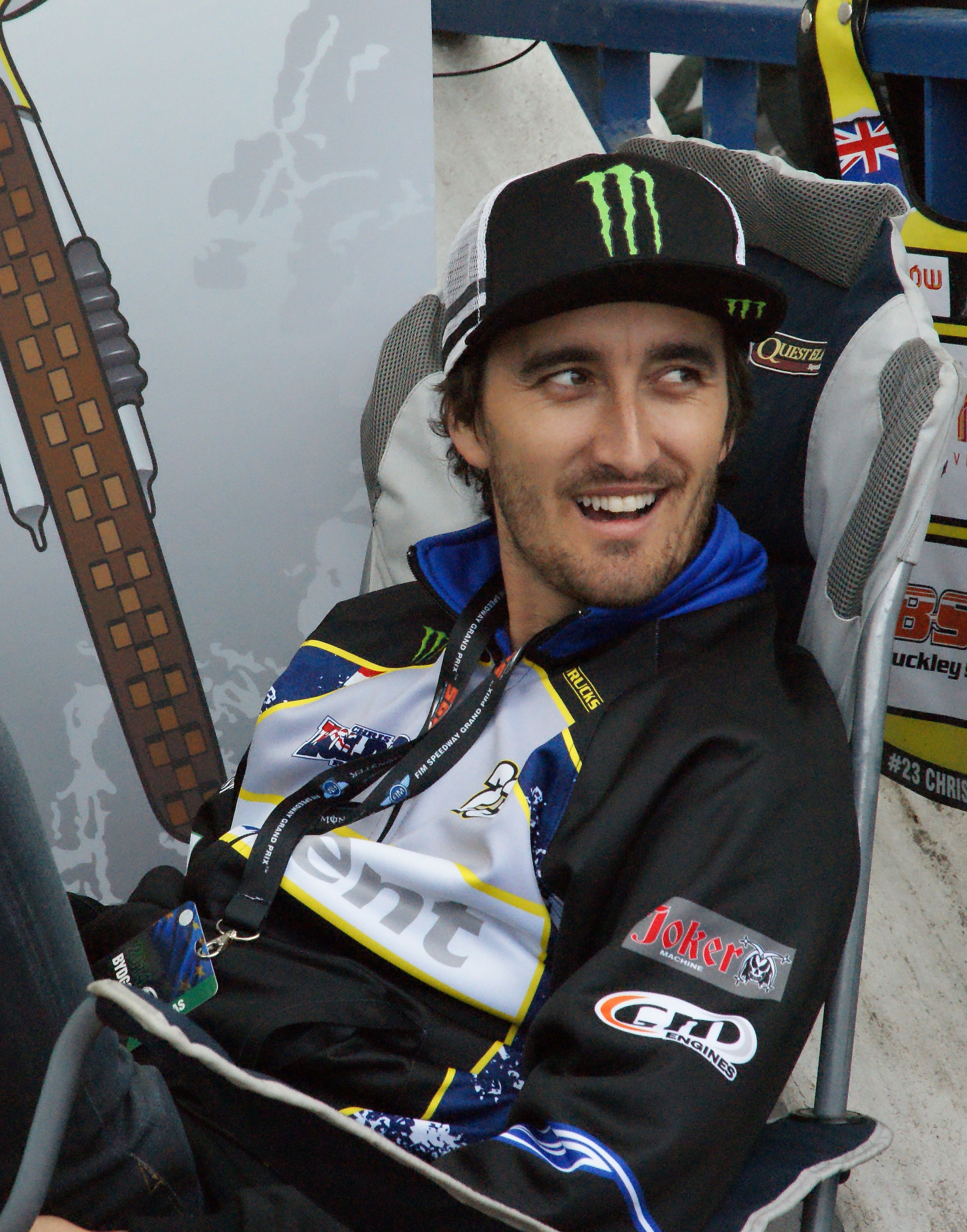
- Chris Holder, four time winner
- Sport: Motorcycle speedway
- Founded: 1986
- Most titles: Leigh Adams, Max Fricke, Chris Holder (all 4)

The Australian Under-21 Speedway Championship is a motorcycle speedway championship held each year since 1986, to determine the Australian Under-21 national champion. The event is organised by Motorcycling Australia (MA).

== History ==
The event was run as the Australian Under-18 Championship in 1986. This lasted just one year and was changed to the Under-21 Championship in 1987, to bring it in line with the Individual Speedway Junior World Championship which was also for Under-21s.

The inaugural Under-21 Championship in 1987 was held at the Undera Park Speedway in Victoria. The championship was won by Queenslander Gary Allan. It would take another 22 years (2009) before another Queenslander Darcy Ward won the event.

Leigh Adams from Mildura, Sydney's Chris Holder and Victorian rider Max Fricke, jointly hold the record for most wins in the Australian Under-21 Championship with four wins each. Leigh Adams, Darcy Ward and Max Fricke are the only Australian Under-21 Champions to have won the Under-21 World Championship.

== Past Winners ==
Year	Venue	Winner	Runner-up	3rd place	ref
1986*	Olympic Park Speedway	Nigel Tremelling (Vic)			
1987	Undera Park Speedway	Gary Allan (Qld)	Steve Langdon (Qld)	Tony Langdon (Qld)	
1988	North Arm Speedway	Leigh Adams (Vic)	Scott Norman (SA)	Craig Boyce (NSW)	
1989	Olympic Park Speedway	Craig Hodgson (SA)	Scott Norman (SA)	Leigh Adams (Vic)	
1990	Riverland Speedway	Leigh Adams (Vic)	Shane Bowes (SA)	Shane Parker (SA)	
1991	Olympic Park Speedway	Leigh Adams (Vic)	Shane Parker (SA)	Jason Lyons (Vic)	
1992	Riverview Speedway	Leigh Adams (Vic)	Jason Hawkes (Vic)	Jason Crump (Vic)	
1993	Olympic Park Speedway	Ryan Sullivan (SA)	Cory Alderton (Vic)	Jason Hawkes (Vic)	
1994 & 1995 not held
1996	North Arm Speedway	Ryan Sullivan (SA)	Brett Woodifield (SA)	Nigel Sadler (SA)	
1997	Undera Park Speedway	Adam Shields (NSW)	Nigel Sadler (SA)	Craig Watson (NSW)	
1998	Olympic Park Speedway	Travis McGowan (Vic)	Chris Szauter (NSW)	Adam Shields (NSW)	
1999	Gold Coast Speedway	Nigel Sadler (SA)	Kevin Doolan (Vic)	Rusty Harrison (SA)	
2000	Oakburn Park Speedway	Travis McGowan (Vic)	Kevin Doolan (Vic)	Scott Smith (Qld)	
2001	Gillman Speedway	Rusty Harrison (SA)	Ashley Jones (Vic)	Ben Shields (NSW)	
2002	Gillman Speedway	Travis McGowan (Vic)	Cameron Woodward (Vic)	Rusty Harrison (SA)	
2003	Oakburn Park Speedway	Rory Schlein (SA)	Cameron Woodward (Vic)	Jaye Stevens (NSW)	
2004	Undera Park Speedway	Rory Schlein (SA)	Robert Ksiezak (SA)	Matthew Wethers (SA)	
2005	Oakburn Park Speedway	Chris Holder (NSW)	Rory Schlein (SA)	Cameron Woodward (Vic)	
2006	Gillman Speedway	Chris Holder (NSW)	Troy Batchelor (Qld)	Jason Doyle (NSW)	
2007	Gillman Speedway	Chris Holder (NSW)	Troy Batchelor (Qld)	Robert Ksiezak (SA)	
2008	Olympic Park Speedway	Chris Holder (NSW)	Tyron Proctor (Vic)	**	
2009	Gosford Speedway	Darcy Ward (Qld)	Kozza Smith (NSW)	Aaron Summers (SA)	
2010	Olympic Park Speedway	Darcy Ward (Qld)	Justin Sedgmen (Vic)	Josh Auty ( (England) )	
2011	North Brisbane Speedway	Darcy Ward (Qld)	Richard Sweetman (NSW)	Josh Grajczonek (Qld)	
2012	Loxford Park Speedway	Taylor Poole (NSW)	Justin Sedgmen (Vic)	Alex Davies (NSW)	
2013	Loxford Park Speedway	Max Fricke (Vic)	Taylor Poole (NSW)	Justin Sedgmen (Vic)	
2014	Gillman Speedway	Max Fricke (Vic)	Ryan Douglas (Qld)	Jack Holder (NSW)	
2015	Loxford Park Speedway	Max Fricke (Vic)	Jack Holder (NSW)	Brady Kurtz (NSW)	
2016	Gillman Speedway	Jack Holder (NSW)	Brady Kurtz (NSW)	Max Fricke (Vic)	
2017	Loxford Park Speedway	Max Fricke (Vic)	Jack Holder (NSW)	Jaimon Lidsey (Vic)	
2018	Olympic Park Speedway	Jaimon Lidsey (Vic)	Kye Thomson	Zaine Kennedy	
2019	Willowbank Speedway	Jaimon Lidsey (Vic)	Jordan Stewart (Vic)	Matthew Gilmore	
2020	Undera Park Speedway	Jaimon Lidsey (Vic)	Zach Cook	Jedd List	
2021 not held due to Covid-19
2022	Gillman Speedway	Keynan Rew	Tate Zischke	James Pearson	
2023	Oakburn Park Speedway	Michael West	Tate Zischke	Harrison Ryan	
2024 not held due to lack of entries
2025	Diamond Park Speedway	Beau Bailey	Tate Zischke	James Pearson	

* 1986 run as the Australian Under-18 Championship.
** 2008 No third place awarded. Troy Batchelor fell & was excluded on lap 2, Robert Ksiezak suffered engine failure in lap 2 of the re-run Final leaving Chris Holder and Tyron Proctor as the only finishers

== Medals classification (2 or more) ==
Pos	Rider	Gold	Silver	Bronze	Total
1.	Leigh Adams	4		1	5
	Max Fricke	4		1	5
3.	Chris Holder	4			4
4.	Jaimon Lidsey	3		1	4
5.	Travis McGowan	3			3
	Darcy Ward	3			3
6.	Rory Schlein	2	1		3
7.	Ryan Sullivan	2			

== See also ==
- Sport in Australia
