= Jack Young (speedway rider) =

Australian speedway rider (1925–1987)

- Born: 31 January 1925; Adelaide, South Australia
- Died: 28 August 1987 (aged 62); Adelaide, South Australia
- Nationality: Australian

Career history
- 1949–1951: Edinburgh Monarchs
- 1952–1955: West Ham Hammers
- 1958, 1960–1961: Coventry Bees

Individual honours
- 1951, 1952: World Champion
- 1948, 1954, 1955, 1956, 1958, 1959, 1960, 1963, 1964: South Australian Champion
- 1949, 1950, 1951: Scottish Riders Champion
- 1949 (4), 1950 (2): Adelaide Golden Helmet
- 1951, 1961: Tom Farndon Memorial Trophy
- 1952, 1953, 1955: British Match Race Champion
- 1953: Queensland State Champion
- 1953, 1954: London Riders' Championship
- 1957: Victorian State Champion
- 1953: Brandonapolis
- 1953: The Laurels

Team honours
- 1951: Northern Shield
- 1951: Scottish Cup
- 1960: Midland Cup
- 1961: Central Shield

Jack Ellis Young (31 January 1925 – 28 August 1987) was an Australian motorcycle speedway rider who won the Speedway World Championship in 1951 and 1952. He also won the London Riders' Championship 1953 and 1954 and was a nine time South Australian Champion between 1948 and 1964.

By winning the 1951 and 1952 World Championships, Young became the first Australian to win two World Championships in any form of motorsport.

== Career ==
=== Australia ===
Young started racing bikes with younger brother Frank on the Sand Pits at Findon in Adelaide, before starting his speedway career at the Kilburn Speedway on 9 May 1947 riding a 1926 Harley-Davidson Peashooter borrowed from his brother. There he rode alongside older brother Wally "Joey" Young (1916–1990), and younger brother Frank. Jack and Frank both represented Australia in test matches against England. Quickly proving himself to be one of the best riders in Adelaide, Jack placed an impressive second in the SA title in 1947 (after only having raced at a couple of meetings), and would win his first South Australian Championship in 1948. He would go on to win the SA Championship again in 1954, 1955, 1956, 1958, 1959, 1960, 1963 and 1964, all at Rowley Park Speedway. Young would win the Queensland State Championship in 1953 at the Brisbane Exhibition Ground, and the Victorian State Championship in 1957 at the Tracey's Speedway in Melbourne.

Despite his two World Championships, nine South Australian Championships and the Queensland and Victorian titles, Young would never win or even place in the Australian Individual Speedway Championship, which during his time were held almost exclusively in New South Wales (at the Sydney Showground or Sydney Sports Ground), or in Queensland at the Exhibition Ground. Young declined several invitations to ride in the Australian championship, often preferring to take a break from speedway to enjoy the Australian summer and go fishing. He did finish third in an unofficial "Australian Championship" staged at the Harringay Stadium in London, England in 1950. The promoters of the speedway had a clearing in their schedule and decided fill the space by inviting the top Australian riders in the British Leagues at the time to ride in an Australian Championship. Graham Warren won the meeting from NSW rider Aub Lawson and Young.

Young announced his retirement from Speedway in December 1963 on the night he won his ninth and last SA Championship (counted as the 1963–64 Championship). Young and the rider who would succeed him as South Australia's best rider John Boulger, jointly hold the record for SA title wins with nine each.

A lover of fishing, at his home in Adelaide, Young was known to use his two World Championship trophies as a place to store his sinkers.

Just a year after his death, Young was inducted into the Sport Australia Hall of Fame for his services to speedway. In 2008, Young was posthumously inducted into the Australian Speedway Hall of Fame.

In November 2014, Young was inducted into the Motorcycling South Australia Hall of Fame.

=== International ===
After winning his first South Australian championship in 1948 at Kilburn, as well as impressive displays for Australia in home Test's against England, Young had the attention of British promoters. He was signed by the Edinburgh Monarchs in 1949 after they paid his fare to come over for a trial. He scored maximum points on his debut, winning all six of his rides.

In 1949, 1950 and 1951, Young won the Scottish Riders Championship (now the Scottish Open) at Old Meadowbank in Edinburgh.

In 1951, Young made history by becoming the first second division rider to become World Champion when he won the title at the Wembley Stadium in London. He defeated England's Split Waterman and fellow Australian Jack Biggs in a three way run-off for the title after each had finished the meeting on 12 points.

In 1952, Young moved up a division by joining the West Ham Hammers for a then record transfer fee of UK£3,750. He also retained his World title in front of 93,000 fans at Wembley, thus becoming the first dual World Champion and the first rider to win the title two years in succession.

Young stayed with the Hammers until the end of the 1955 season and is remembered by many West Ham riders and fans alike as the best rider to ever race for the team. Young stayed home in Adelaide for the next two seasons riding mainly at his home track of Rowley Park, but in 1958 he returned to the UK to ride for the Coventry Bees. After again returning home to Adelaide in 1959, he again rode for the Bees in 1960 and 1961.

Young's last World Final appearance was as a reserve rider for the 1961 Championship at the Malmö Stadion in Sweden (the first World Championship Final not held at Wembley). Neither Young, nor the other reserve rider, Swede Leif Larsson, got to ride in the final.

Young also represented Australia in test matches both at home and overseas and had the honour of captaining his country on many occasions. He first represented Australia in the seventh test against England on 17 February 1950 at the Kilburn Speedway in Adelaide and proved his class by top scoring on the night with 17 points. During the early part of his career when riding for the Edinburgh Monarchs, Young also represented Scotland in some matches.

=== Career highlights ===
- World Champion – 1951, 1952
- South Australian Champion – 1948, 1954, 1955, 1956, 1958, 1959, 1960, 1963, 1964
- Scottish Riders Champion – 1949, 1950, 1951
- Adelaide Golden Helmet winner – 1949 (4 wins at Kilburn Speedway) and 1950 (2 wins at Rowley Park Speedway)
- Tom Farndon Memorial Trophy – 1951, 1961
- Queensland State Champion – 1953
- London Riders' Champion – 1953, 1954
- National Trophy (with West Ham Hammers) – 1955
- Victorian State Champion – 1957
- 12 times in succession British Match Race Champion over a two-year period, unbeaten in 33 successive meetings in Britain
- Holds the record for the highest points won in a season in Britain.
- Inducted into the Sport Australia Hall of Fame – 1988
- Inducted into the Australian Speedway Hall of Fame – 2008
- Inducted into the Motorcycling South Australia Hall of Fame – 2014

=== World Final appearances ===
- 1950 – (England) London, Wembley Stadium – 8th – 7pts
- 1951 – (England) London, Wembley Stadium – Winner – 12+3pts
- 1952 – (England) London, Wembley Stadium – Winner – 14pts
- 1953 – (England) London, Wembley Stadium – 5th – 10pts
- 1954 – (England) London, Wembley Stadium – 4th – 11pts
- 1955 – (England) London, Wembley Stadium – 7th – 10pts
- 1960 – (England) London, Wembley Stadium – 10th – 6pts
- 1961 – (Sweden) Malmö, Malmö Stadion – Reserve – Did not Ride

== Death ==
Young died of a lung disorder in Adelaide's Modbury Hospital on 28 August 1987 at the age of 62. Years of riding through dust clouds on British cinder tracks, as well as being a heavy cigarette smoker had left Young with Emphysema. He was survived by his wife Joan whom he had married on 12 May 1945 in the All Saints Church of England in the Adelaide suburb of Hindmarsh. Jack and Joan Young (born Joan Mary Carroll) had one son and two daughters.

Young was the idol of a young rider from Christchurch, New Zealand who rode against him in Australia during the early 1960s, with the two forming a friendship that would last until Jack's passing in 1987. That rider, Ivan Mauger, who was actually based at Rowley Park at the time, would go on to win a record six Speedway World Championships (1968, 1969, 1970, 1972, 1977, 1979), three Long Track World Championships (1971, 1972, 1976), four Speedway World Team Cups (1968, 1971, 1972, 1979), and two Speedway World Pairs Championships (1969, 1970). Mauger credits advice he received from Young at the 1960 Australian Long Track Championship in the South Australian coastal town of Port Pirie for putting him on the path to becoming a World Champion. Although Mauger had easily led his first two rides for the first 3½ laps, he had failed to finish either race due to engine failure. According to the New Zealand rider, Young then told him that the winner wasn't the rider who pushed their bike beyond its limits and didn't finish. It was the rider who scored the most points and you got no points for not finishing. Mauger saying that it taught him the art of winning while still conserving himself and his equipment and (if possible) to always have something left in reserve.

== Jack Young Solo Cup ==
The Jack Young Solo Cup (formerly known as the Jack Young Memorial Cup) is held in his honour every year at the Gillman Speedway in Adelaide after being previously held from 1990 to 1997 at Gillman's predecessor North Arm Speedway. The first cup was won by Swedish rider Jimmy Nilsen at the conclusion of an Australia vs the Rest of the World test match. The second running of the race again saw a win by a Swedish rider, 1984 and 1988 Ice Racing World Champion Erik Stenlund. The race was again run at the conclusion of Test, this time between Australia and Sweden. The international flavour continued in 1992 when the Cup was won by England's Steve Schofield. The first Australian winner was Mildura rider Jason Lyons who won the Cup in 1993.

Ten-time Australian Solo Champion Leigh Adams from Mildura holds the record with five wins in 1994 and 1997 (North Arm), and 2001, 2002 and 2003 (Gillman). The first South Australian rider to win the cup was Shane Bowes who won in 1996.

1995 winner Tomasz Gollob from Poland (who was based at North Arm for the 1994/95 Australian season) is the only rider to win the cup who has emulated Young's feat of winning the Individual Speedway World Championship. Gollob won the 2010 Speedway Grand Prix series to become the World Champion, while Leigh Adams was the 1992 World Under-21 Champion and Eric Stenlund was a dual Ice Racing World Champion.

With the closure of North Arm in 1997, and the new Gillman Speedway not ready for championship meetings until 2001, the Jack Young Solo Cup was not held from 1998 to 2000. Leigh Adams won the Cup the last time it was held at North Arm in 1997 as well as the first time it was run at Gillman in 2001. The 2001 meeting, held on 26 January (Australia Day), was also the official opening of the new Gillman Speedway.

After being a single, six lap race for many years, the Jack Young Solo Cup is currently run in a championship format with riders earning points in the heats before the top scorers go into a semi final and then the final. The current holder of the Jack Young Solo Cup is Tyron Proctor who won his third JYSC in four years on 28 November 2015.

* Note: The winner of the "Scottish Open Championship", of which Young was a three time winner, also receives the "Jack Young Memorial Scottish Open Trophy" in honour of the former Edinburgh Monarchs star rider. Adelaide's Rory Schlein and Mildura's Justin Sedgmen are the only two riders to win both.

=== Jack Young Solo Cup winners ===
Year	Venue	Winner
1990	North Arm Speedway	Jimmy Nilsen ( (Sweden) )
1991	North Arm Speedway	Erik Stenlund ( (Sweden) )
1992	North Arm Speedway	Steve Schofield ( (England) )
1993	North Arm Speedway	Jason Lyons ( (Australia) )
1994	North Arm Speedway	Leigh Adams ( (Australia) )
1995	North Arm Speedway	Tomasz Gollob ( (Poland) )
1996	North Arm Speedway	Shane Bowes ( (Australia) )
1997	North Arm Speedway	Leigh Adams ( (Australia) )
1998	Not Held – no track	
1999	Not Held	
Year	Venue	Winner
2000	Not Held	
2001	Gillman Speedway	Leigh Adams ( (Australia) )
2002	Gillman Speedway	Leigh Adams ( (Australia) )
2003	Gillman Speedway	Leigh Adams ( (Australia) )
2004	Gillman Speedway	Kevin Doolan ( (Australia) )
2005	Gillman Speedway	Rory Schlein ( (Australia) )
2006	Gillman Speedway	Robert Ksiezak ( (Australia) )
2007	Gillman Speedway	Filip Šitera ( (Czech Republic) )
2008	Gillman Speedway	Kevin Doolan ( (Australia) )
2009	Gillman Speedway	Aaron Summers ( (Australia) )
Year	Venue	Winner
2010	Gillman Speedway	Josh Auty ( (England) )
2011	Gillman Speedway	Justin Sedgmen ( (Australia) )
2012	Gillman Speedway	Davey Watt ( (Australia) )
2013	Gillman Speedway	Tyron Proctor ( (Australia) )
2014	Gillman Speedway	Robert Branford ( (Australia) )
2015	Gillman Speedway	Tyron Proctor ( (Australia) )
2016	Gillman Speedway	Tyron Proctor ( (Australia) )
2017	Gillman Speedway	Justin Sedgmen ( (Australia) )
