= Robert Branford (speedway rider) =

Australian speedway rider

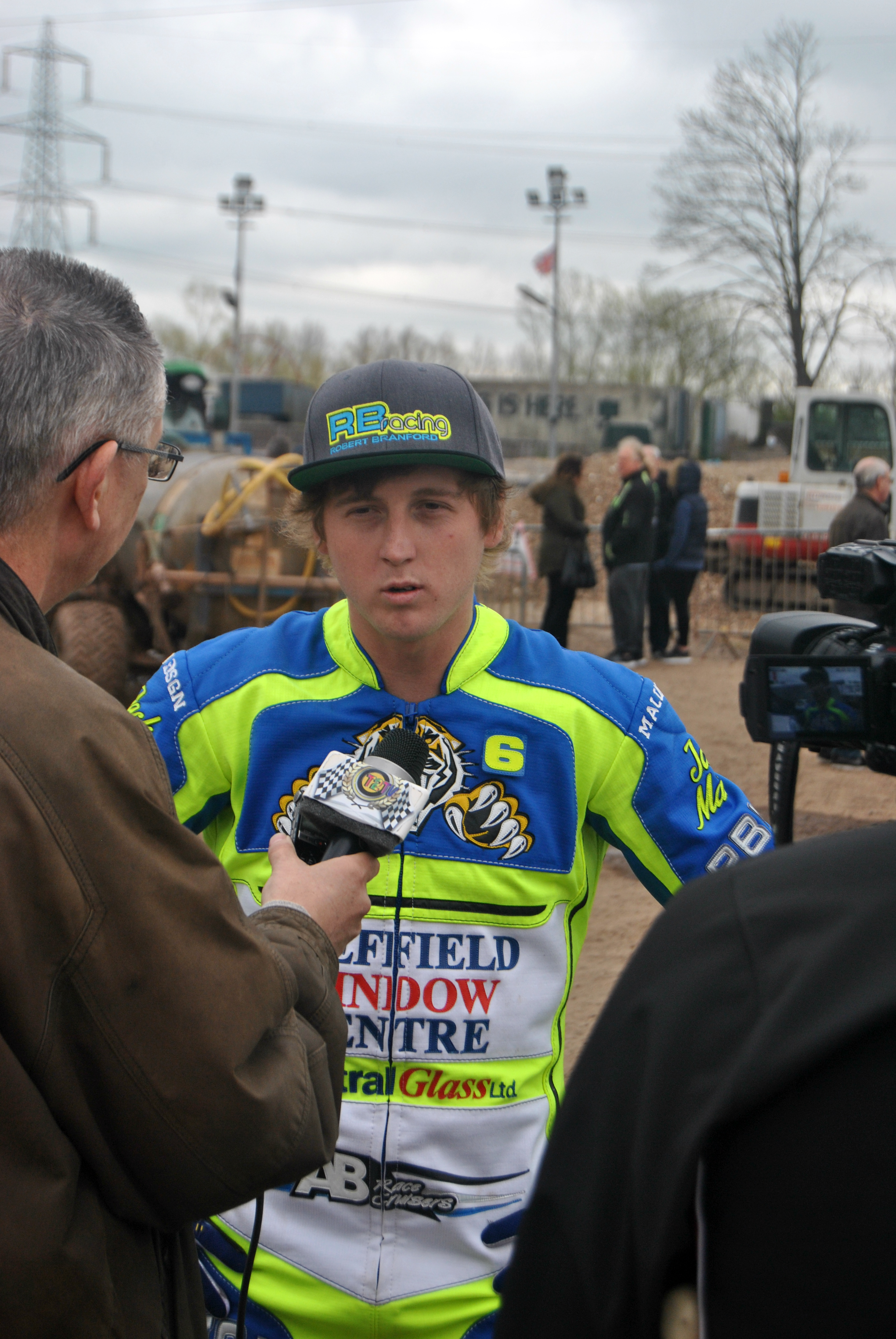
- Born: 23 November 1993 (age 32); Adelaide, South Australia, Australia
- Nationality: Australian

Career history

Great Britain
- 2010–2011: Buxton Hitmen
- 2011, 2012: Redcar Bears
- 2012: Berwick Bandits
- 2013: Coventry Storm
- 2013: Leicester Lions
- 2015: Edinburgh Monarchs
- 2016: Rye House Raiders

Individual honours
- 2013: British Under-21 Champion
- 2014: Jack Young Solo Cup winner
- 2014: Chum Taylor Cup winner
- 2015: Victorian State Under-21 Champion

Team honours
- 2010: National Trophy
- 2010: Knockout Cup
- 2010: National League
- 2016: National League Fours

Robert Peter Branford (born 23 November 1993) is an Australian former motorcycle speedway rider.

== Career ==
Born in Adelaide, South Australia, Branford is the son of former Australian rider Darrell Branford. Following in his father's footsteps, Robert took up speedway at the age of ten at the Sidewinders Speedway in Adelaide, and twice finished third in the South Australian Under-16 Championship.

In 2010, Branford began his British speedway career with Buxton Hitmen in the National League, riding as part of the team that won the National Trophy, the National League Knock-Out Cup, and National League Championship that season.

In late 2010, Branford was signed by Premier League Redcar Bears on a full transfer, and rode for both Redcar and Buxton in 2011. He averaged 2.82 for the Bears in 2011, and the following season only made a handful of Premier League level appearances for Redcar and Berwick Bandits, suffering a knee injury late in the season.

In 2013, Branford signed for National League Coventry Storm after an injury to Oliver Greenwood, and was a surprise winner of the British Under-21 Championship in April, qualifying for the competition as he holds a British passport, which he qualified for via his Barnsley-born mother.

Branford was subsequently signed by Leicester Lions to ride in the Premier League, initially sharing the number seven position with Lewis Blackbird, but taking the position full-time after Blackbird was allowed to join Scunthorpe Scorpions. He lost his place in July to Storm teammate James Sarjeant.

On 26 January 2014, Branford won the Jack Young Solo Cup at his home track, the Gillman Speedway in Adelaide. Branford also finished second in the Gillman Solo Championship in 2010 (behind Sam Martin), and again in 2013 when he finished second in the final to Shane Parker. Branford also won the Chum Taylor Cup at the Pinjar Park Speedway in Perth and later won the Victorian Under-21 Championship held in Albury–Wodonga.

In 2016, Branford was part of the Rye House Raiders team that won the National League Fours, held on 14 August 2016 at Brandon Stadium.
