= 2016 Team Speedway Junior World Championship =

Motorcycle racing competition

Seasons
- ← 2015 2017 →

The 2016 Team Speedway Junior World Championship was the 12th FIM Team Under-21 World Championship season. The final took place on 20 August, 2016 at the ICA Maxi Arena in Norrköping, Sweden.Poland won their ninth Team Under-21 World Championship. The Poles accumulated 44 points, with Bartosz Zmarzlik and Paweł Przedpełski scoring 14 points each, to beat Australia by seven points.

== Semi-finals ==
- (Denmark) Holsted
- 4 June 2016
- Referee: (Italy) Giuseppe Grandi

National team	Pts
Denmark	41
Australia	40
Great Britain	32
Norway	10

- (Czech Republic) Plzeň
- 4 June 2016
- Referee: (Poland) Artur Kusmierz

National team	Pts
Poland	43
Russia	30
Germany	28
Czech Republic	25

== Final ==
- (Sweden) Norrköping
- 20 August 2016
- Referee: (Finland) Mika Laukkanen

Pos.	National team	Pts.
1	Poland	44
2	Australia	37
3	Denmark	24
4	Sweden	17

== Scores ==
(Poland)	POLAND	44
No	Rider Name	Pts.	Heats
1	Krystian Pieszczek	9	3,0,3,1,2
2	Bartosz Zmarzlik	14	2,3,3,3,3
3	Paweł Przedpełski	14	2,3,3,3,3
4	Bartosz Smektała	7	1,2,0,3,1
5	Daniel Kaczmarek	0	-,-,-,-,-

(Australia)	AUSTRALIA	37
No	Rider Name	Pts.	Heats
1	Brady Kurtz	7	2,2,0,2,1
2	Jake Allen	13	3,3,3,2,2
3	Max Fricke	8	2,2,1,1,2
4	Jack Holder	9	1,3,2,2,1
5	Cameron Heeps	0	-,-,-,-,-

(Denmark)	DENMARK	24
No	Rider Name	Pts.	Heats
1	Frederik Jakobsen	10	0,1,2,3,1,3
2	Mikkel B. Andersen	5	0,1,1,0,3
3	Patrick Hansen	8	3,1,2,2,0,0
4	Andreas Lyager	1	1,X,0
5	Jonas Jeppesen	0	-,-,-,-,-

(Sweden)	SWEDEN	17
No	Rider Name	Pts.	Heats
1	Kenny Wennerstam	0	0,X,R
2	Joel Kling	1	0,R,0,1,0,0
3	Filip Hjelmland	3	1,1,0,1,0
4	Joel Andersson	13	3,2,2,2,2,2
5	Alexander Woentin	0	-,-,-,-,-

== See also ==
- 2016 Speedway World Cup
- 2016 Individual Speedway Junior World Championship
