= 2016 Speedway Under-21 World Championship =

World motorcycle speedway event

World Under-21 Championship
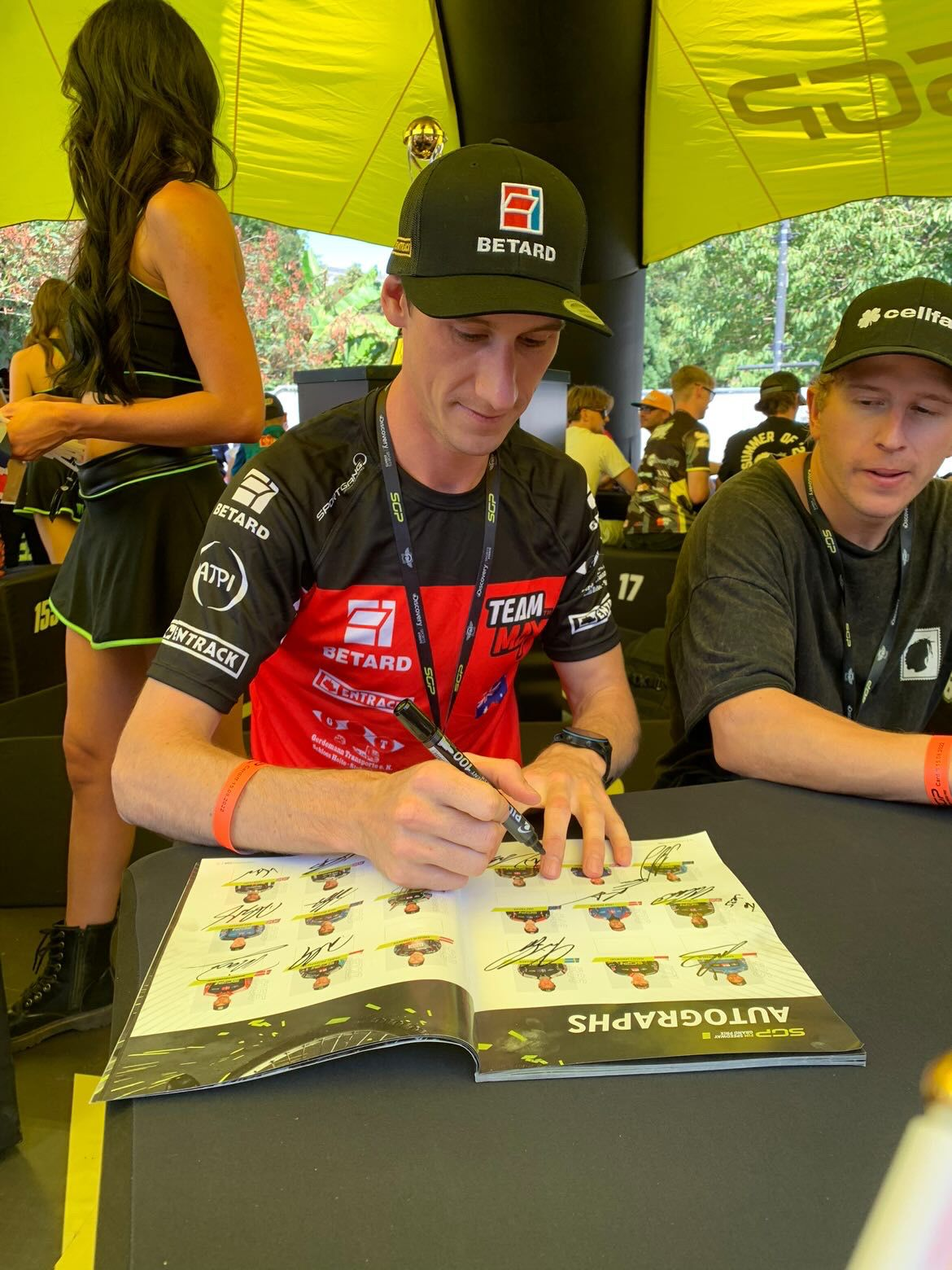
- Max Fricke

The 2016 Individual Speedway Junior World Championship was the 40th edition of the FIM World motorcycle speedway Under-21 Championships.

It was staged over three rounds, at King's Lynn, Pardubice and Gdańsk.

The championship was won by triple Australian Under-21 Champion Max Fricke who become Australia's fifth Under-21 World Champion. Fricke's consistent run over the series in which he finished 3rd in the first two rounds and 2nd in the final round saw him score 46 points. Finishing in second place was Polish rider Krystian Pieszczek with 40 points while British rider Robert Lambert defeated Australia's Jack Holder (the younger brother of 2012 World Champion Chris Holder) in a run-off in the final round in Poland to claim 3rd place after both riders finished the series on 37 points.

== Final series ==
No.	Date	Venue	Winner	Runner-up	3rd place
1	18 June	(England) King's Lynn Stadium, King's Lynn	(Poland) Krystian Pieszczek	(United Kingdom) Robert Lambert	(Australia) Max Fricke
2	16 September	(Czech Republic) Svítkov Stadium, Pardubice	(France) Dimitri Bergé	(Denmark) Patrick Hansen	(Australia) Max Fricke
3	October 2	(Poland) Zbigniew Podlecki Stadium, Gdańsk	(Russia) Viktor Kulakov	(Australia) Max Fricke	(Germany) Erik Riss

== Classification ==
The meeting classification was according to the points scored during the meeting, with the total points scored by each rider during each meeting credited as World Championship points. The FIM Speedway Under 21 World Champion was the rider who collected most World Championship points at the end of the series. In case of a tie between one or more riders in the final overall classification, a run-off decided the 1st, 2nd and 3rd places. For all other placings, the better-placed rider in the last meeting was the better placed rider.

Pos.	Rider	Points	(England)	(Czech Republic)	(Poland)
Gold	(Australia) Max Fricke	46	12	18	16
Silver	(Poland) Krystian Pieszczek	40	20	9	11
Bronze	(United Kingdom) Robert Lambert	37	19	11	7
4	(Australia) Jack Holder	37	13	12	12
5	(France) Dimitri Bergé	35	6	19	10
6	(Denmark) Patrick Hansen	35	6	14	15
7	(Russia) Viktor Kulakov	27	6	6	15
8	(Germany) Erik Riss	27	10	6	11
9	(Poland) Paweł Przedpełski	26	6	11	9
10	(United Kingdom) Josh Bates	23	12	5	6
11	(Czech Republic) Eduard Krčmář	19	6	6	7
12	(United Kingdom) Adam Ellis	17	5	5	7
13	(Poland) Bartosz Smektała	16	7	6	3
14	(Denmark) Mikkel B. Andersen	9	2	5	2
15	(Sweden) Joel Andersson	9	5	4	–
16	(Sweden) Kenny Wennerstam	4	–	–	4
17	(Poland) Dominik Kossakowski	3	–	–	3
18	(United Kingdom) Zach Wajtknecht	1	1	–	–
19	(United Kingdom) Nathan Greaves	1	1	–	–
20	(Czech Republic) Patrik Mikel	1	–	1	–
21	(United Kingdom) Max Clegg	0	0	–	–
22	(Czech Republic) Ondrej Smetana	0	–	0	–
23	(Czech Republic) Josef Novák	0	–	0	–
24	(Poland) Kacper Woryna	0	–	–	0
25	(Poland) Oskar Bober	0	–	–	0
26	(Poland) Maksym Drabik	0	–	–	–

== See also ==
- 2016 Speedway Grand Prix
- 2016 Team Speedway Junior World Championship
