= Robert Ksiezak =

Australian speedway rider (born 1987)

- Born: 15 January 1987 (age 39); Adelaide, South Australia
- Nationality: Australian, Polish

Career history

Poland
- 2008: Toruń
- 2009: Opole

Great Britain
- 2005–2006: Edinburgh
- 2006–2008, 2010, 2012: Glasgow
- 2009: Birmingham
- 2009: Stoke
- 2012: Plymouth

Individual honours
- 2006: Jack Young Solo Cup winner

Robert Ksiezak (born 15 January 1987 in Adelaide, South Australia) is an Australian former motorcycle speedway rider.

== Career ==
Ksiezak started his British career with the Edinburgh Monarchs in 2005. He lost his team place halfway through the 2006 season and was quickly signed by Edinburgh's rivals the Glasgow Tigers. He chose to stay with Glasgow in 2007, leading to the club purchasing his contract from Edinburgh. He agreed terms to be the Belle Vue Aces number 8 for the 2008 season.

Ksiezak has Polish and Australian citizenship. On 6 May 2008, he gained a Polish speedway licence (Licencja "Ż") at Toruń. Since then he has taken part in the Polish Championships as a Polish domestic rider (as Robert Księżak).

Ksiezak finished second in the Gillman Division 1 Solo Championship at his home track in Adelaide, the Gillman Speedway in 2009 and 2012. He was also the winner of the Jack Young Solo Cup at Gillman in 2006. The Jack Young Cup is named in honour of Adelaide's 1951 and 1952 Speedway World Champion who died in 1987. Ksiezak joined the likes of Jimmy Nilsen, Leigh Adams and Tomasz Gollob as a winner of the Cup.

In 2012, Ksiezak rode for Plymouth Devils but broke his ankle in a crash during the August of that season.

== World Final appearances ==
=== Individual U-21 World Championship ===
- 2007 - (Poland) Ostrów Wielkopolski, Edward Jancarz Stadium - Reserve - Did not ride

=== Under-21 World Cup ===
- 2008 - (Denmark) Holsted - 4th - 33pts (2)
