= Justin Sedgmen =

Australian motorcycle speedway rider (born 1992)

- Born: 17 February 1992 (age 34); Mildura, Victoria, Australia

Career history

Great Britain
- 2009: Somerset Rebels
- 2010, 2022-2023: Birmingham Brummies
- 2010–2011, 2016: Swindon Robins
- 2011: Newport Wasps
- 2011: Plymouth Devils
- 2012: Redcar Bears
- 2012: Lakeside Hammers
- 2014–2015, 2019, 2024–2025: Edinburgh Monarchs
- 2017: Ipswich Witches
- 2017: Belle Vue Aces
- 2019, 2021–2022, 2025: Sheffield Tigers
- 2020–2021: Glasgow Tigers
- 2023: Leicester Lions

Poland
- 2010: Miskolc
- 2011: Opole
- 2014: Ostrów
- 2016: Zielona Góra
- 2023–2025: Daugavpils

Individual honours
- 2011, 2017: Jack Young Solo Cup winner
- 2013, 2020, 2021, 2022: Victorian champion
- 2018, 2022, 2024: South Australian champion

Team honours
- 2014, 2015: Premier League
- 2014: Premier League Knockout Cup
- 2014, 2015, 2022: League Cup
- 2015: Four-Team Championship

Justin Maxwell Sedgmen (born 17 February 1992) is an Australian motorcycle speedway rider.

== Career ==
Junior career

Born in Mildura, Victoria, Justin Sedgmen and his older brother Ryan Sedgmen (born December 1990) began their speedway careers at Mildura's Olympic Park Speedway on the 112 metres (122 yd) infield junior track.

Justin and Ryan teamed to win the 2005 and 2006 Australian Under-16 Pairs Championships, and Justin followed that up by winning again in 2007 with Dakota North (after his brother had turned 16 and was riding in the senior ranks).

Sedgmen finished the 2007 Australian Under-16 Championship at the Gold Coast Speedway in Queensland in equal first place with 13 points with Dakota North, but ultimately finished third in the Final behind North and Darcy Ward.

Senior career

In 2009, both Justin and Ryan signed a contract with Speedway Ekstraliga team Unia Leszno, but they did not start in the league. Before a 2010 season, Sedgmen signed to Hungarian Speedway Miskolc. He also rode for Swindon Robins in 2010 and 2011.

In 2011, Sedgmen won the Jack Young Solo Cup at the Gillman Speedway in Adelaide. Also in 2011, Sedgmen was part of the Australian Under-21 Team that won the second semi-final of the Under-21 World Cup. Australia withdrew from the Final in Balakovo, Russia due to travel cost and visa problems, along with Sweden and Great Britain.

In 2012, Sedgmen rode for Redcar Bears in the Premier League, doubling up with Lakeside Hammers in the Elite League, but was dropped by the Bears in July after inconsistent performances.

In 2012, Sedgeman won his first senior title, winning the Victorian State Championship at Undera Park. After sitting out the 2013 UK season, Sedgmen joined Edinburgh Monarchs in the Premier League in 2014, winning the league title with the team, and going on to ride for them for two seasons.

Sedgmen won the 2014–15 Gillman Speedway Division 1 Solo Championship on 6 December 2014. He set the tone for the meeting in the first heat of the night with a time of 55.0 seconds, easily the fastest time of the night and only one-tenth outside Leigh Adams' almost 6-year-old track record.

Sedgmen finished a to date career best third place in the four round 2015 Australian Championship behind runaway winner Jason Doyle and runner-up Sam Masters. Sedgemen and reigning champion Max Fricke both finished the series on 48 points, but was awarded third place after having finished in front of Fricke in each of the B or A Finals they contested against each other over the series. Also, Sedgmen qualified for the A final in both Round 1 at Gillman and again in Round 2 at Mildura while Fricke only qualified for the A final in Round 3 at Undera Park. Sedgmen's best A final result was second at Gillman behind Doyle while he finished third behind Doyle and 2012 world champion Chris Holder at Olympic Park.

Later in 2015, Sedgmen and Max Fricke were named as the two reserve riders for the 2015 Speedway Grand Prix of Australia which was held at the Etihad Stadium in Melbourne, although neither got to race on the night. A fortnight later Sedgmen raced in the Darcy Ward Tribute Meeting at Gillman in Adelaide to raise money for the injured Australian rider. Sedgmen won his semi-final to make the A final, but was excluded for breaking the tapes at the start of the final.

Sedgmen was part of the Edinburgh team that won the Premier League Four-Team Championship final, which was held on 1 October 2015, at the Media Prime Arena.

In November 2015, Sedgmen rejoined Swindon Robins for the 2016 Elite League season, and signed to ride for Grindsted in Denmark.

In 2015, Sedgmen finished third in the Australian Solo Championship. In 2016, he signed to ride for Lokomotiv Daugavpils in the Polish first division, but didn't ride for them, and in June was loaned to Ekstraliga team Falubaz Zielona Góra. Also in 2016, he won the Jason Crump Invitational at Kurri Kurri.

For the 2017 season, Sedgmen rode for Belle Vue and Ipswich and after missing the 2018 British season he returned to ride for Edinburgh during the SGB Championship 2019 season. However, a serious hand injury ended his involvement.

After a disrupted 2020 season due to the COVID-19 pandemic, he returned to ride for Sheffield Tigers and Glasgow Tigers during 2021.

In 2022, Sedgmen rode for the Sheffield in the SGB Premiership 2022 and for the Birmingham Brummies in the SGB Championship 2022. He helped Sheffield win the 2022 League cup and reach the Play off final. In 2023, he signed for Leicester Lions for the SGB Premiership 2023 and re-signed for Birmingham for the SGB Championship 2023. He re-signed for a third spell with Edinburgh for the 2024 Championship season and shortly afterwards won a third South Australian championship.

In 2025, Sedgmen remained with Edinburgh but was also brought in for Sheffield to replace Danyon Hume in a reshuffle for the injured Tai Woffinden.

== Family ==
Sedgmen is the son of former Australian rider Gavin Sedgmen and the grandson of Phil Sedgmen.

== Major results ==
=== World Championships ===
Under-21 Individual World Championship

- 2009 – 10th placed in the Semi-Final Two
- 2010 – qualify to the Semi-Final

Under-21 World Cup (Australian Team)

- 2009 – 3rd placed in the Qualifying Round One
- 2010 – 2nd placed in the Qualifying Round One
- 2011* – Won Semi-final Two

* Australia withdrew from the 2011 U/21 WC Final due to the cost of travel and visa problems

=== Australian Championships ===
Australian Under-21 Championship

- 2009 – Gosford, NSW, Gosford Speedway – 4th – 7pts (6th) – 4th in Final
- 2010 – Mildura, Vic, Olympic Park Speedway – 2nd – 12pts (2nd) – 2nd in Final
- 2011 – Brisbane, Qld, North Brisbane Speedway – N/A
- 2012 – Kurri Kurri, NSW, Loxford Park Speedway – 2nd – 9pts (6th) – 2nd in Final
- 2013 – Kurri Kurri, NSW, Loxford Park Speedway – 3rd – 12pts (2nd) – 3rd in Final

Australian Championship

- 2009 – 15th – 16pts (3 rounds)
- 2010 – 7th – 36pts (3 rounds)
- 2011 – 5th – 51pts (4 rounds)
- 2012 – 8th – 38pts (3 rounds)
- 2013 – N/A (3 rounds)
- 2014 – 6th – 53pts (3 rounds)
- 2015 – 3rd – 48pts (4 rounds)
- 2016 – 6th – 46pts (4 rounds)
- 2017 – 2nd – 55pts (4 rounds)

== Speedway Grand Prix results ==
Year	Position	Points	Best finish	Notes
2015	NC	-		Reserve rider in Australia

== See also ==
- Australia national under-21 speedway team
