= Sam Martin (speedway rider) =

Australian speedway rider (born 1989)

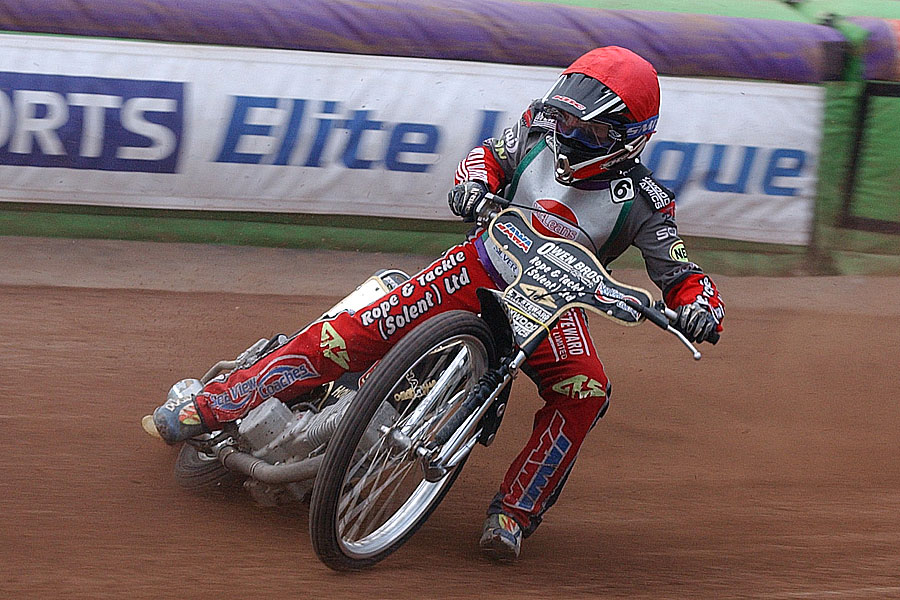
- Martin riding for Oxford in 2004
- Born: 8 February 1989 (age 37); Adelaide, South Australia
- Nationality: Australian

Career history
- 2004-2005, 2007: Oxford
- 2006: Boston Barracudas
- 2007: Berwick Bandits
- 2008: Sheffield Tigers
- 2008: Scunthorpe Scorpions

Individual honours
- 2010, 2012: Gillman Solo Championship

Team honours
- 2005: Conference League Champions

Sam Alan Martin (born 8 February 1989, in Bedford Park, Adelaide, Australia) is an Australian motorcycle speedway rider.

== Career ==
Martin began his British league career when he signed for the junior team of the Oxford Cheetahs (or Silver Machine which they were known as that season). The juniors were called the Oxford Silver Machine Academy and competed in the 2004 Speedway Conference League. The following season, he rode for Oxford again and won the 2005 Speedway Conference League before joining Boston Barracudas in 2006. He returned to Oxford for 2007.

It was also in 2007 that the Premier League came calling and Martin rode for Berwick Bandits during. the 2007 Premier League speedway season. In 2008, he sealed the final team place with the Sheffield Tigers.
