= Josh Pickering =

Australian speedway rider

- Born: 30 November 1996 (age 29); Heddon Greta, New South Wales, Australia
- Nationality: Australian

Career history

Great Britain
- 2017–2024: Edinburgh
- 2021, 2023–2025: Sheffield
- 2022–2023: King's Lynn

Poland
- 2019: Krosno
- 2022: Rawicz
- 2023: Gniezno
- 2024: Gdańsk
- 2025: Leszno
- 2026: Gdańsk

Denmark
- 2023: Region Varde

Individual honours
- 2024: Championship Riders' Champion

Team honours
- 2023: SGB Premiership
- 2024: Premiership Knockout Cup

Joshua Pickering (born 30 November 1996) is an Australian motorcycle speedway rider.

== Career ==
Pickering began his British speedway career riding for Edinburgh in 2017. He began his championship average at the assessed 5.00 and completed the season with the fifth-highest average of 4.62. By the end of the 2019 season, despite a mid-season injury at Birmingham, his average for the Monarchs was past his assessed average and had reached 6.98. Pickering, however, criticized the Championship league structure as unfair on riders from other countries due to its reduction in their number of matches completed by each team.

While still riding for the Monarchs in the Championship in mid-2021, the Sheffield Tigers signed Pickering for their Premiership team. Co-promoter Damien Bates remarked at the time, "[I]t’s a surprise he’s not had a Premiership place before," replacing then-team member Justin Sedgmen.

Pickering signed for the King's Lynn Stars ahead of the 2022 Premiership Season. During the 2022 season, he rode for the King's Lynn in the SGB Premiership 2022 and for Edinburgh in the SGB Championship 2022.

In 2023, Pickering re-signed for King's Lynn for the SGB Premiership 2023 and remained the team captain but suffered injuries and later switched to Sheffield. The switch proved successful as he helped Sheffield win the league title. He also re-signed for Edinburgh for the SGB Championship 2023.

In 2024, Pickering re-signed for Sheffield and Edinburgh respectively, winning the Knockout Cup with the Tigers. He also saw individual success when he won the Rider's Championship.
