= Max Fricke =

Australian speedway rider (born 1996)

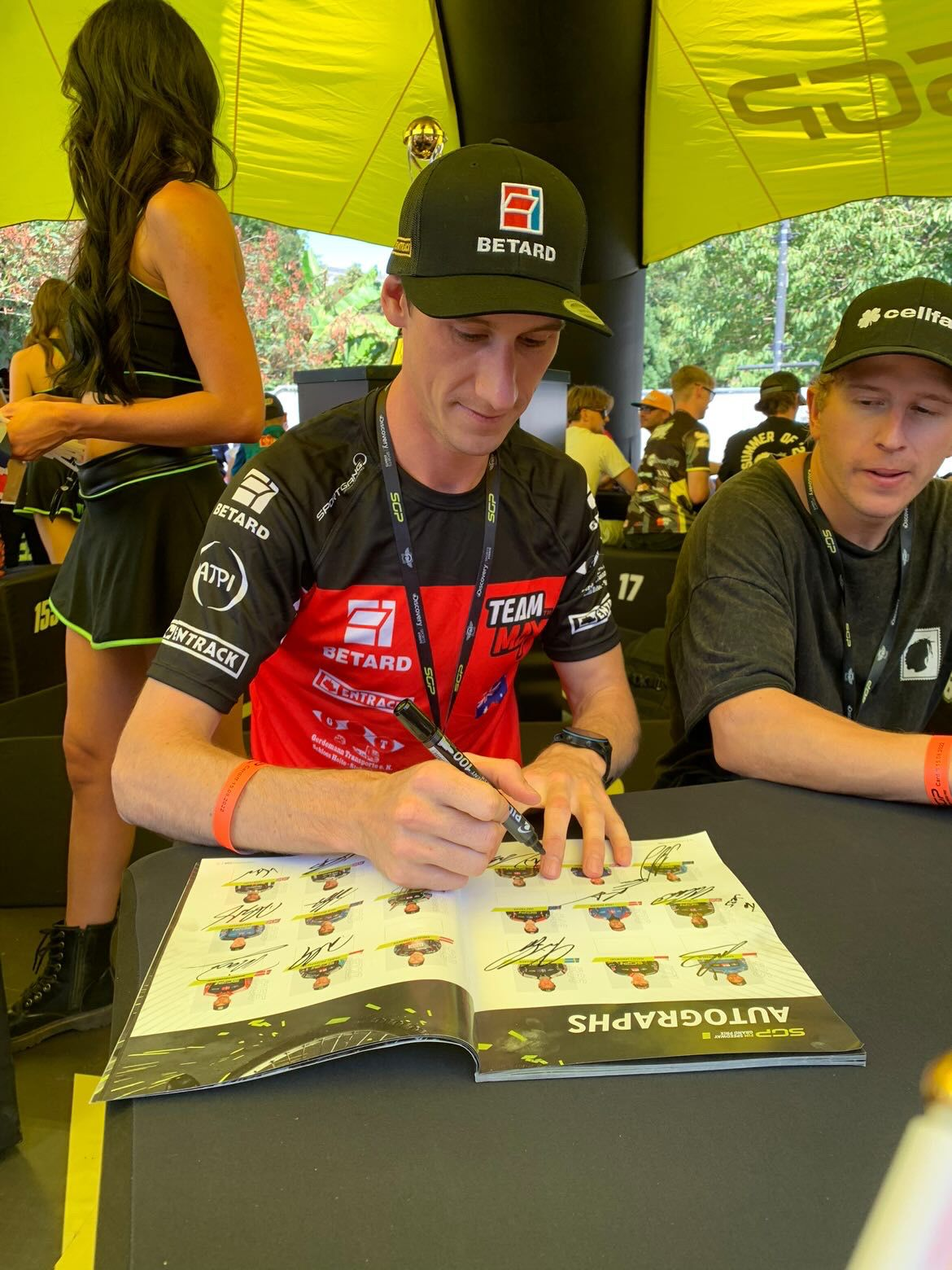
- Born: 29 March 1996 (age 30); Mansfield, Victoria, Australia
- Nationality: Australian

Career history

Great Britain
- 2013–2014: Edinburgh Monarchs
- 2015–2020, 2022: Belle Vue Aces
- 2023–2025: Leicester Lions
- 2026: Kings Lynn Stars

Poland
- 2015–2017: Rybnik
- 2018–2020: Wrocław
- 2021–2022: Zielona Góra
- 2023–2026: Grudziadz

Sweden
- 2015: Gnistorna
- 2016–2019: Rospiggarna
- 2020–2023: Indianerna
- 2024: Västervik

Denmark
- 2014: Esbjerg
- 2014–2016: Region Varde
- 2019: Grindsted

Speedway Grand Prix statistics
- SGP number: 46
- Starts: 75
- Finalist: 6 times
- Winner: 3 times

Individual honours
- 2013, 2014, 2015, 2017: Australian Under-21 Champion
- 2015: Czech Golden Ribbon
- 2016: World Under-21 Champion
- 2019, 2020, 2022: Australian Champion
- 2019: South Australian Champion

Team honours
- 2022, 2026: World Team Champion
- 2022: British Premiership
- 2025: Premiership KO Cup
- 2014: Premier League Pairs
- 2016: Danish Speedway League
- 2016: Elitserien

Max Fricke (born 29 March 1996) is an Australian speedway rider. He is an U21 World Champion, World team champion, three-time Australian champion, and four-time Australian Under-21 Champion.

== Career ==
Fricke competed in junior levels of motocross and speedway in Australia, competing in the 2011 and 2012 FIM Youth Gold Cup tournaments, and finished in fourth place in the Australian Under-16 125cc Championship and second in the 125cc Team Championship in January 2012.

Fricke moved up to senior level in the 2012/13 season. In December 2012, he was signed by Edinburgh Monarchs for their 2013 British Premier League team on a five-point assessed average, having spent the previous two summers in Britain gaining experience.

In January 2013, Fricke won the Australian Under-21 championship at the Loxford Park Speedway in Kurri Kurri, becoming the youngest winner of the title since Leigh Adams in 1988. On 25 January 2014, Fricke won his second straight Australian Under-21 Championship at the Gillman Speedway in Adelaide. Fricke finished the heats with 13 points before winning the final.

Together with Sam Masters, Fricke won the 2014 Premier League Pairs Championship for Edinburgh at Somerset Rebels.

Fricke fishing equal third on 48 points with Justin Sedgmen in the four round 2015 Australian Championship (his best result to date) before winning his third straight Australian U/21 Championship at Loxford Park on 17 January, defeating Jack Holder and Brady Kurtz in a closely fought final. Fricke contested his first Under-21 World Championship in 2015, finishing the three round series held in Italy, Poland and the Czech Republic in 6th place with 28 points scored.

Although he did not get to ride on the night, Fricke was named as a reserve rider for the 2015 Speedway Grand Prix of Australia held on 24 October at the Etihad Stadium in Melbourne. A week after the SGP in Melbourne, Fricke was part of the Australian Under-21 Team alongside Nick Morris, Jack Holder and Brady Kurtz that finished in third place in the 2015 Team Speedway Junior World Championship final held at Olympic Park in Mildura, the first time the U/21 World Cup Final had been held outside of the UK or Europe. Fricke scored 6 of his team's 29 points as they finished behind winners Poland and runner-up Denmark.

On 13 December 2015, Fricke finished second in the 2015/16 South Australian Solo Championship at Gillman in Adelaide behind NSW rider Rohan Tungate. Fricke would go on to finish the championship in 3rd place having scored 52 points to finish behind winner Brady Kurtz and runner-up Sam Masters.

On 20 August 2016, Fricke, along with reigning Australian Champion Brady Kurtz, Jake Allen, Jack Holder and reserve rider Cameron Heeps finished in 2nd place in the 2016 Team Speedway Junior World Championship in Norrköping, Sweden. On 2 October 2016, Fricke won the 2016 World Under-21 Championship becoming the 5th Australian rider to win the title.

Fricke was named first reserve for the later rounds of the 2016 Speedway Grand Prix and following a broken chain to wild card rider Brady Kurtz before the start of heat 11 of the SGP in Melbourne, Fricke got his first start in the senior World Championship and became the 200th rider to race in the series since its inception in 1995.

On 28 January 2017, Fricke won his fourth Australian U/21 Championship at Loxford Park in Kurri Kurri. By winning the title, Fricke joined Leigh Adams and Chris Holder as a four-time winner of the event. He also equaled Leigh Adams' five podium finishes in the title with the same four wins and one 3rd-place finish record.

On 12 January 2019, Fricke won the Australian Solo Championship, a second place in the fifth round enough to secure the title ahead of Rohan Tungate and Chris Holder. He won his first Grand Prix in 2020 at Toruń.

Fricke finished in 13th place during the 2022 Speedway World Championship, after securing 52 points during the 2022 Speedway Grand Prix, which included winning the Stadion Narodowy, Warsaw Grand Prix. He qualified for the 2023 Speedway Grand Prix by virtue of finishing fourth in the 2023 Speedway Grand Prix Qualification. However, the highlight of his season was winning the 2022 Speedway of Nations for Australia with Jack Holder. In addition, he won a league title with the Belle Vue Aces during the SGB Premiership 2022.

Fricke signed for Leicester Lions for the SGB Premiership 2023 and for GKM Grudziądz for the 2023 Polish speedway season. In 2023, he was part of the Australian team that finished fourth in the 2023 Speedway World Cup final.

Fricke finished in ninth place during the 2023 Speedway Grand Prix and can be considered unlucky not to have earned a place for the 2024 Speedway Grand Prix. He re-signed with Leicester for the 2024 season.

Fricke's 2024 season started well after he finished second in the 2024 Australian Championship, following a tight battle with Rohan Tungate. Following an injury to fellow Australian Jason Doyle before round 4 of 2024 Grand Prix season, Fricke was called up as a replacement. Fricke ended his 2024 season by qualifying for the 2025 Speedway Grand Prix by finishing fourth in the 2025 GP Challenge.

In 2025, Fricke helped Leicester defeat King's Lynn to win the Knockout Cup. He finished eighth in the World Championship.

== Major results ==
=== World individual Championship ===
- 2016 Speedway Grand Prix – 35th (0 pts)
- 2017 Speedway Grand Prix – 18th (11 pts)
- 2019 Speedway Grand Prix – 16th (36 pts)
- 2020 Speedway Grand Prix – 10th (64 pts)
- 2021 Speedway Grand Prix – 8th (94 pts)
- 2022 Speedway Grand Prix – 13th (52 pts)
- 2023 Speedway Grand Prix – 9th (83 pts)
- 2024 Speedway Grand Prix – 11th (69 pts)
- 2025 Speedway Grand Prix – 8th (79 pts)
- 2026 Speedway Grand Prix – 7th (97 pts)

=== Grand Prix wins ===
- 1: 2020 Speedway Grand Prix of Poland (Toruń)
- 2: 2022 Speedway Grand Prix of Poland (Warsaw)
- 3: 2026 Speedway Grand Prix of Great Britain (Manchester R3)

=== World team Championships ===
- 2017 Speedway World Cup – 5th
- 2018 Speedway of Nations – 4th
- 2019 Speedway of Nations – 3rd
- 2020 Speedway of Nations – 5th
- 2021 Speedway of Nations – 4th
- 2022 Speedway of Nations – Champion
- 2023 Speedway World Cup – 4th
- 2024 Speedway of Nations – 2nd
- 2026 Speedway World Cup – Champion

=== Individual Under-21 World Championship ===
- 2015 - 6th - 28pts
- 2016 - Winner - 46pts

=== Under-21 Speedway World Cup ===
- 2015 - 3rd - 29pts (6)
- 2016 - 2nd - 37pts (8)
