= Dakota North (speedway rider) =

Motorcycle speedway rider

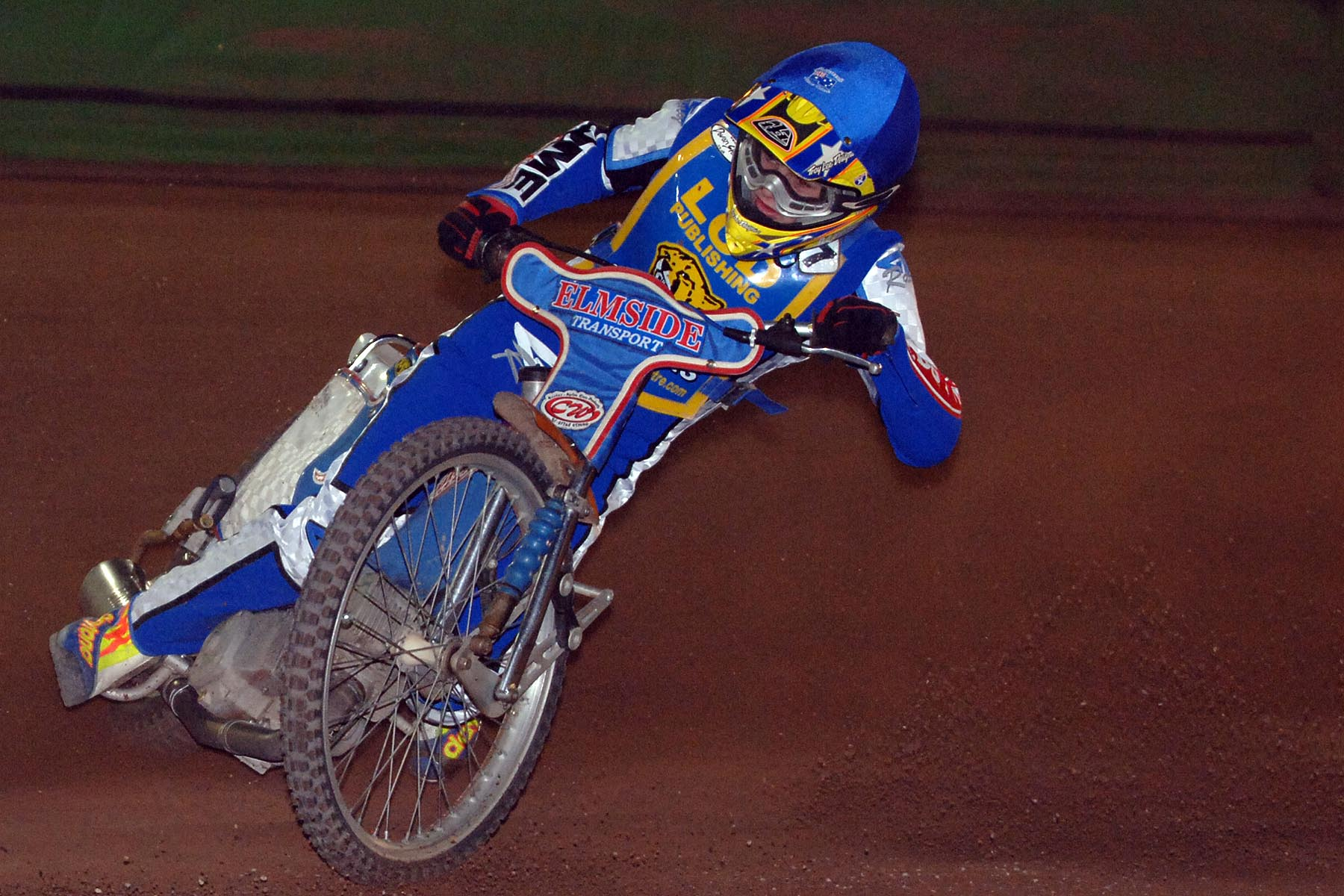
- North riding for Oxford Lions in 2007
- Born: 4 August 1991 (age 35); Shepparton, Victoria
- Nationality: Australian

Career history

Great Britain
- 2007: Mildenhall
- 2010: Newcastle
- 2011, 2013: Peterborough
- 2011: Somerset
- 2012: Ipswich
- 2012: King's Lynn
- 2012: Birmingham
- 2014: Swindon
- 2015: Poole

Denmark
- 2015: Region Varde

Individual honours
- 2007: Australian Under-16 Champion

Team honours
- 2007: Australian Under-16 Pairs
- 2010: Premier League Trophy

Dakota Max North (born 4 August 1991) is an Australian former motorcycle speedway rider.

== Career ==
North, named by his father – former Stoke Potters rider Rod North – after the Douglas Dakota aircraft, was born in Shepparton, Victoria, Australia in 1991. He took up speedway at the age of twelve and won the Australian Under-16 Championship and the Australian Junior Pairs title (with Justin Sedgmen) in 2007.

After a few appearances in Britain in 2007, North signed with Mildenhall Fen Tigers in 2009, but his season was cut short after chipping two vertebrae in a crash while representing Australia at Under-21 level in July against Great Britain. In December 2009, he was signed by Elite League Peterborough Panthers as a club asset and was loaned to Premier League team Newcastle Diamonds for the 2010 season.

North signed for Somerset Rebels for the 2011 season, also doubling-up in the Elite League with the Panthers. In 2012, North joined the Ipswich Witches in a loan deal. In April 2012, he was added to the King's Lynn Stars team in the Elite League, replacing Filip Šitera, but was replaced at the end of the month by Mateusz Szczepaniak. The following month, he signed for Birmingham Brummies, sharing a doubling-up position with Josh Auty. In 2013, he signed to ride in the Elite League for Peterborough Panthers. In July 2013 North joined the Glasgow Tigers until the end of the 2013 season, whilst also continuing his duties with the Panthers

== World Final appearances ==
=== Individual Under-21 World Championship ===
- 2012 – 15th – 21pts

=== Under-21 World Cup ===
- 2012 – (Poland) Gniezno, Stadion Startu Gniezno – 2nd – 44pts (8)
