= Sam Masters =

Tanzania artist Samson waryoba (born in 05/16/1/995) Artist name Sam Master

- Born: 23 May 1991 (age 35); Newcastle, New South Wales
- Nationality: Australian

Career history

Great Britain
- 2010–2012: Somerset Rebels
- 2011: King's Lynn Stars
- 2012: Poole Pirates
- 2014–2017, 2019–2022: Edinburgh Monarchs
- 2015, 2024–2025: Leicester Lions
- 2016–2023: Wolverhampton Wolves
- 2023–2026: Oxford Cheetahs

Poland
- 2015, 2018: Lublin
- 2016: Kraków
- 2017, 2019: Ostrów
- 2020: Opole
- 2021: Rzeszów
- 2022: Rawicz
- 2023–2025: Gniezno

Sweden
- 2016–2017: Lejonen
- 2018: Rospiggarna
- 2019–2020: Västervik
- 2023: Dackarna

Denmark
- 2015–2016: Region Varde
- 2018: Holsted
- 2021: Esbjerg

Individual honours
- 2011, 2022: Div 2 rider's title
- 2013: New South Wales State Champion
- 2014, 2022: Scottish Open Champion
- 2015: Victorian State Champion
- 2017: Australian Champion

Team honours
- 2025: Premiership KO Cup
- 2014, 2015: Premier League
- 2014: Premier League KO Cup
- 2014: Premier League Pairs
- 2015: Premier League Fours

Samuel Peter Masters (born 23 May 1991) is an Australian motorcycle speedway rider who won the Premier League Riders' Championship in 2011. Masters is an Australian Champion having won the Championship in January 2017.

== Career ==
Masters was born in Newcastle, New South Wales, Australia. He began racing at the age of six, initially in dirt-track races, but at the age of eleven followed his uncle and cousins into speedway. After winning the New South Wales Under-16 championship in four consecutive years, and also the Australian under-16 title, he moved into senior competition in 2007. He also represented Australia in the FIM Youth Gold Cup in 2006 and 2007. He signed a contract with Polish team Gorzow, but did not ride competitively for them.

In 2009, Masters was signed by Premier League team the Somerset Rebels for the 2010 season and in 2010 won the New South Wales under-21 title. In December 2010, he was signed by Elite League team King's Lynn Stars in a doubling-up role for the 2011 season.

In September 2011, Masters won the Premier League Riders Championship at Sheffield's Owlerton Stadium. He finished the season as Somerset's number one, but missed the end of the season after being banned for 28 days by the Speedway Control Bureau due to comments made on Facebook about a referee. In November an SCB court of enquiry gave Masters a suspended 12-month ban and a £2,000 fine.

Masters was a member of the Australian Under-21 team that finished second in the 2012 Under-21 World Cup Final in Gniezno, Poland.

In December 2012, Masters won the New South Wales Championship at the Loxford Park Speedway in Kurri Kurri. He was later signed for the 2013 Premier League season by Edinburgh Monarchs, but failed to get a work permit to ride in the UK.

In March 2014, Masters eventually joined the Edinburgh Monarchs. Together with Max Fricke, they won the Premier League. Knockout Cup, League Cup and Pairs titles.

On 29 November 2014, Masters won the 2014/15 Victorian State Championship at the Undera Park Speedway defeating fellow Edinburgh riders Justin Sedgmen and Max Fricke. He then went on to finish second behind a runaway Jason Doyle in the four round 2015 Australian Championship, winning the Rd.3 "A Final" at Undera Park, while finishing second to Doyle in the "A Final" in the fourth and final round at Loxford Park.

Masters got his first start in the Speedway Grand Prix World Championship series in 2015 when he was given the Wildcard spot for the 12th and final round of the season to be held at the Etihad Stadium in Melbourne (where he finished 12th with 5 points). He was involved in a heated clash with triple World Champion Nicki Pedersen at the end of Heat 8. Unhappy that Pedersen had squeezed him close to the wall on the back straight, the two exchanged words at the pit gate. Then as Masters was walking back to his pit he was confronted by Pedersen's mechanic Marek Hu. More words were exchanged and Masters punched Hu before being led away. For his actions Masters was fined by the FIM.

Masters was part of the Edinburgh team that won the League titla again in 2014 and the Premier League Four-Team Championship final, which was held on 1 October 2015, at the Media Prime Arena.

On 14 January 2017, Masters won his first Australian Championship when he took out the 4-round series. Masters scored 58 points over the 4 rounds, including winning Round 2 at Olympic Park in Mildura, to defeat Justin Sedgmen (55) and Davey Watt (50). Masters was crowned the champion at his home track, the Loxford Park Speedway in Kurri Kurri located south of Newcastle.

In 2022, Masters rode for the Wolverhampton Wolves (he joined Wolverhampton in 2016) in the SGB Premiership 2022 and for the Edinburgh Monarchs in the SGB Championship 2022. Also in 2022, he won the Championship rider's title for the second time and recorded the highest Championship average riding for Edinburgh but suffered a broken collarbone on Wolves duty.

In 2023, Masters signed for Wolves for the 7th consecutive season, competing in the SGB Premiership 2023, taking the captaincy role and earning a testimonial meeting. He also joined Oxford Cheetahs in the SGB Championship 2023.

Masters re-signed for Oxford for 2024 and moved from Wolves (following their closure) to Leicester in the Premiership. He was made captain for Oxford Cheetahs in the absence of Scott Nicholls for the start of the 2025 season. In 2025, he helped Leicester defeat King's Lynn to win the Knockout Cup.

== World Final Appearances ==
=== Speedway World Cup ===
- 2016 – (England) Manchester, National Speedway Stadium – 4th – 22pts (5)

=== Individual Under-21 World Championship ===
- 2012 - 11th - 37pts

=== Under-21 World Cup ===
- 2012 - (Poland) Gniezno, Stadion Startu Gniezno - 2nd - 44pts (6)

== Speedway Grand Prix results ==
Year	Position	Points	Best finish	Notes
2015	22nd	5		Wildcard rider in Australia
2016	26th	2		Wildcard rider in Australia
