= Jordan Stewart (speedway rider) =

Australian speedway rider

- Born: 13 November 1998 (age 28); Mildura, Australia
- Nationality: Australian

Career history
- 2018–2021: Redcar Bears
- 2021: Ipswich Witches

Jordan Stewart is an Australian speedway rider, born 13 November 1998, Mildura, Australia.

== Career ==
Stewart he won the 2017 Victorian State Under 21 Speedway Championship qualifying for the Australian Championship in which he finished with 15 points after completion of the four rounds.

Stewart joined the Redcar Bears for the SGB Championship 2018 season and later that year in November 2018, he won the Jason Lyons Trophy at Mildura's Olympic Park Speedway. He gained his first major trophy win with Redcar when they lifted the Championship Knock-Out Cup in 2019.

Two bad events defined Stewart's next two seasons, the first was in 2020, when he was unable to make a Premiership appearance after he signed for the Swindon Robins but the season was cancelled due to the COVID-19 pandemic. Then in 2021, when riding for Redcar he was involved in a crash at Birmingham, receiving multiple injuries (broken and dislocated collarbone, broken shoulder blade and rib damage) that ruled him out for the remainder of the season.

== Career details ==
2021

Mildura Masters Solo Speedway
Mildura - Victoria - Australia - Jordan finished third on the rostrum in the 'A' final after winning the 'B' final to qualify.

Phil Crump Solo International

Mildura - Victoria - Australia - Jordan qualified for the 'B' final but failed to make the 'A' final.

2020

Australian Solo Championship results:

Rnd	Venue	Total	1	2	3	4	5	B	A
1.	Kurri Kurri	2	2	-	-	-	-	-	-
2.	Albury	6	0	0	2	3	1	-	-
3.	Undera	5	1	1	1	2	0	-	-
4.	Mildura	4	2	2	0	0	0	-	-
5.	Gillman	1	1	0	X	X	X	-	-

Round 1 - 04/01/2020 - Kurri Kurri - Abandoned after 4 heats due to unsafe track - points do not count.
Round 2 - 06/01/2020 - Albury - Did not qualify for A or B final.
Round 3 - 07/01/2020 - Undera - Did not qualify for A or B final.
Round 4 - 09/01/2020 - Mildura - Did not qualify for A or B final.
Round 5 - 12/01/2020 - Gillman - Withdrew after 2 qualifying races.

2019

FIM Oceania Speedway Championship
Gillman - Adelaide - Jordan scored 14 points finishing in fourth place.

World Under-21 Team Cup

12/7/19 Represented Australia in the Team Speedway Junior World Championship final at the National Speedway Stadium, Manchester, England. Jordan scored 5 points out of Australia's 21 finishing in fourth place behind winners Poland, runners-up Great Britain and third place Denmark.

29/4/19 Selected as Australian reserve Under-21 representative for the Speedway of Nations Championship Race-Off 2 Manchester

28/4/19 - Sheffield Speedway Top Gun - Winner

Australian Under-21 Championship @ Wilowbank 19/1/2019

RUNNER -UP - Jordan scored 12 points to qualify for the B final. He won the B final to qualify for the A final where he finished second.

Australian Solo Championship results:

Jordan finished the 2019 Championship with a total of 34 points.

Rnd	Venue	Total	1	2	3	4	5	B	A
1.	Gillman	11	3	2	3	3	0	-	Fourth (fell - disqualified from heat)
2.	Mildura	6	1	0	3	0	2	-	-
3.	Undera	6	1	0	3	1	1	-	-
4.	Albury	3	1	1	0	0	1	-	-
5.	Kurri Kurri	8	2	3	1	1	1	-	-

Round 1 - 03/01/2019 - Gillman - Fourth (reached A final with 11 points from 5 rides but fell and disqualified from heat)
Round 2 - 05/01/2019 - Mildura - 6 points from 5 rides but failed to qualify for the B Final
Round 3 - 07/01/2019 - Undera - 6 points from 5 rides but failed to qualify for the B Final
Round 4 - 09/01/2019 - Albury - 3 points from 5 rides but failed to qualify for the B Final
Round 5 - 12/01/2019 - Kurri Kurri - 8 points from 5 rides but failed to qualify for the B Final

2018
Victorian State Under 21 Speedway Championship - Broadford - Winner
Jason Lyons Trophy - Mildura’s Olympic Park - Winner
