= Josh Grajczonek =

Australian motorcycle racer

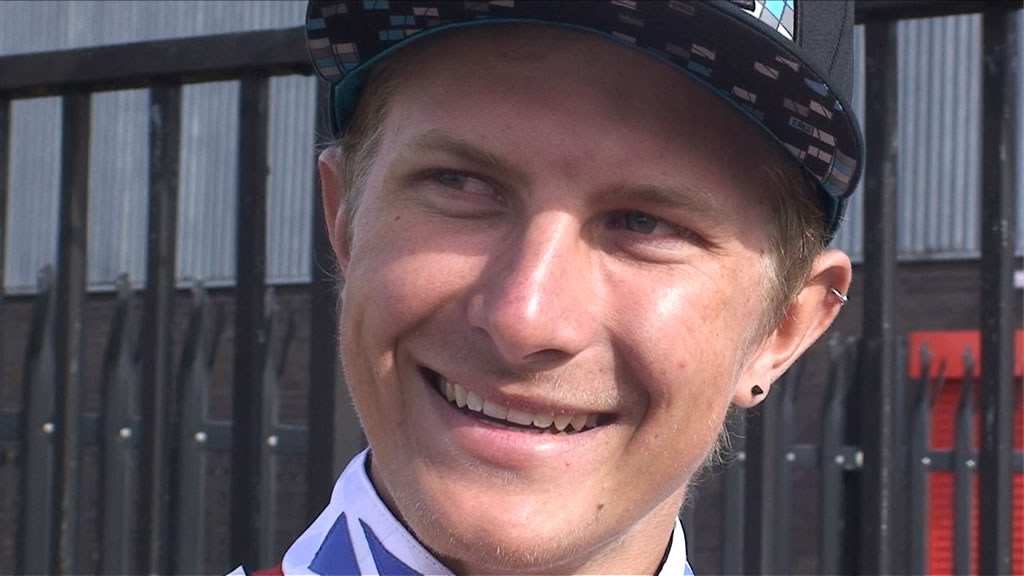
- Josh Grajczonek (2010)
- Born: 5 February 1990 (age 36); Townsville, Queensland
- Nationality: Australian

Career history

Great Britain
- 2008–2012: Glasgow Tigers
- 2009–2010, 2012, 2015: Belle Vue Aces
- 2011, 2016: Swindon Robins
- 2013, 2015–2017: Somerset Rebels
- 2013–2015, 2018–2019: Poole Pirates
- 2014: Workington Comets
- 2017, 2020: Sheffield Tigers

Poland
- 2017: Rzeszów
- 2018: Łódź
- 2019: Bydgoszcz

Denmark
- 2016: Slangerup

Individual honours
- 2009, 2011, 2012, 2013, 2014, 2015 2020, 2023: Queensland champion

Team honours
- 2011, 2013: Speedway Premier League
- 2013, 2014: Speedway Elite League
- 2013: Premier League Pairs Champion

Joshua Lee Grajczonek (born 5 February 1990) is an Australian former motorcycle speedway rider. He is a record eight times winner of the Queensland championship.

== Career ==
Born in Townsville, Queensland, Grajczonek's big break in British Speedway came as an 18-year-old with the Glasgow Tigers. During four years with the team, he won his first major trophy as a Speedway rider, the 2011 Premier League. For the majority of his time in Britain, he has 'doubled-up' riding for a team in both the Elite League and the Premier League.

In 2013, Grajczonek won the treble with Somerset Rebels; the league, cup and Premier League Pairs Championship partnering Jason Doyle, during the 2013 Premier League speedway season.

After spells with both the Belle Vue Aces and the Swindon Robins in the Elite League, Grajczonek experienced two successful years riding for the Poole Pirates. In two full seasons with the team he won the Elite League on both occasions. Despite being a part of such a successful period with the club he was initially left out of the teams plans for the 2015 season and it looked as though he would be left without an Elite League club for the 2015 season. However, after an unfortunate injury to fellow Australian Davey Watt shortly before the start of the season Poole turned to Grajczonek and drafted him in as a temporary replacement. In 2016, he won the Premier League Pairs Championship for the second time, this time partnering Rohan Tungate for Somerset Rebels, during the 2016 Premier League speedway season.

Grajczonek is an eight-time Queensland Solo Champion, winning the title in 2009, 2011, 2012, 2013, 2014, 2015, 2020 and 2023.

In 2018 and 2019, Grajczonek rode for Poole once again in the SGB Premiership.

== World Championship Appearances ==
=== Speedway World Cup ===
- 2016 – (England) Manchester, National Speedway Stadium – 4th – 22pts (0)
