= Ty Proctor =

Australian speedway rider (born 1987)

- Born: 27 February 1987 (age 39); Longwarry, Victoria
- Nationality: Australian

Career history
- 2008–2009: Redcar Bears
- 2008, 2019: Peterborough Panthers
- 2009–2014: Wolverhampton Wolves
- 2013: Plymouth Devils
- 2014–2015, 2019: Sheffield Tigers
- 2017–2018: Workington Comets
- 2018–2021: King's Lynn Stars
- 2019–2021: Leicester Lions
- 2022: Berwick Bandits

Individual honours
- 2010, 2011, 2016: Victoria Solo Championship

Team honours
- 2009: Elite League
- 2010, 2011: Elite Shield
- 2018, 2019: SGB Championship
- 2018: SGB Championship Shield

Tyron Brian Proctor (born 27 February 1987) is an Australian speedway rider.

== Career ==
Born in Longwarry, Victoria, Proctor attended the Longwarry Primary School and Drouin Secondary College. Ty's brother Toby was also a speedway rider. Proctor started riding motorbikes after being left one by a relative who had died of leukaemia.

After finishing fourth in the Western Australia Solo Championship, Proctor began his British speedway career in 2008 with Redcar Bears in the Premier League, also riding in the Elite League for Peterborough Panthers. He stayed with the Bears in 2009, but in the Elite League switched to Wolverhampton Wolves, with whom he won the Elite League and the Elite Shield, and stayed with the team through to the end of the 2014 season, winning the Elite Shield again in 2011. In 2010 he won the Victoria Solo Championship. He also rode in the Premier League for Plymouth Devils (2013), Sheffield Tigers (2014–2015), and Workington Comets (from 2017), his career interrupted by visa issues in 2015 and 2016. His 2013 season finished early after sustaining fractured vertebrae in a crash at Edinburgh.

In 2018, Proctor moved from the Wolves to King's Lynn Stars in the newly-formed SGB Premiership, staying with Comets in the new SGB Championship, winning the SGB Championship and the Championship Shield that year. He started the 2019 season with the Stars and Sheffield Tigers, but after losing both places, was signed by Peterborough Panthers and Leicester Lions.

In 2021, Proctor rode for the King's Lynn Stars in the SGB Premiership 2021 and the Leicester Lions in the SGB Championship 2021. In 2022, he rode for the Berwick Bandits in the SGB Championship 2022.
