= Rohan Tungate =

Australian speedway rider (born 1990)

- Born: 27 January 1990 (age 36); Kurri Kurri, New South Wales, Australia

Career history

Great Britain
- 2012–2015, 2022: Ipswich Witches
- 2013: Poole Pirates
- 2016: Swindon Robins
- 2016–2017: Somerset Rebels
- 2017–2018: Belle Vue Aces
- 2019–2020: Peterborough Panthers
- 2024: Oxford Spires

Poland
- 2014: Gniezno
- 2015–2020: Łódź
- 2020, 2022-2023: Zielona Góra
- 2021: Tarnów
- 2024–2025: Rybnik
- 2026: Częstochowa

Sweden
- 2018–2021: Lejonen
- 2022: Masarna
- 2023: Indianerna
- 2024: Smederna
- 2025: Piraterna

Denmark
- 2018: Esbjerg
- 2017: Region Varde
- 2019–2021: Slangerup
- 2026: Nordjysk

Speedway Grand Prix statistics
- Starts: 1

Individual honours
- 2018, 2024: Australian Champion
- 2015/16: South Australian champion
- 2016/17, 2017/18: New South Wales champion
- 2016: Slovakian Champion

Team honours
- 2013, 2016: Elite League
- 2015, 2016: Premier League Pairs
- 2016: Premier League Cup
- 2017: SGB Premiership Knock-out Cup
- 2026: World team champion

Rohan Tungate (born 27 January 1990) is an Australian speedway rider who has competed in the United Kingdom and Poland. He won the Australian Solo Championship in 2018.

== Career ==
Born in Kurri Kurri, New South Wales, Tungate made his British speedway debut in 2012 with Ipswich Witches in the Premier League, spending four seasons with the club.

In 2013, Tungate also rode in the Poole Pirates team that won the Elite League. In 2015, he won the Premier League Pairs Championship partnering Danny King for Ipswich Witches during the 2015 Premier League speedway season.

In 2016, Tungate doubled up between Premier League team Somerset Rebels and that year's winners of the Elite League, Swindon Robins. With Rebels teammate Josh Grajczonek, he won the Premier League Pairs for the second consecutive year.

Tungate also raced in Poland for Start Gniezno in 2014, and Orzeł Łódź in 2015 and 2016.

Tungate was the South Australian Champion in 2015/16, the Slovakian Champion in 2016, and the New South Wales State Champion in 2016.He stayed with Somerset in 2017 after their move up to the SGB Premiership, but was dropped in May, later riding for Belle Vue Aces and going on to win the Premiership Knock-Out Cup with them.

In November 2017, Tungate won the Jack Young Solo Cup at Gillman, and in December won the Crump Cup at Kurri Kurri. Tungate rode in one Speedway Grand Prix, the Australian round in October 2017, scoring 6 points.

In 2018, Tungate rode for Belle Vue and also won the Australian Championship in 2018.

Tungate joined Peterborough for the 2019 and 2020 seasons. In 2022, he rode for the Ipswich Witches in the SGB Premiership 2022. After missing the 2023 British season, he signed for the Oxford Spires for the 2024 season.

Tungate's 2024 season started well after he won the 2024 Australian Championship to claim his second national championship, following a tight battle with Max Fricke.
