= Undera =

- Town
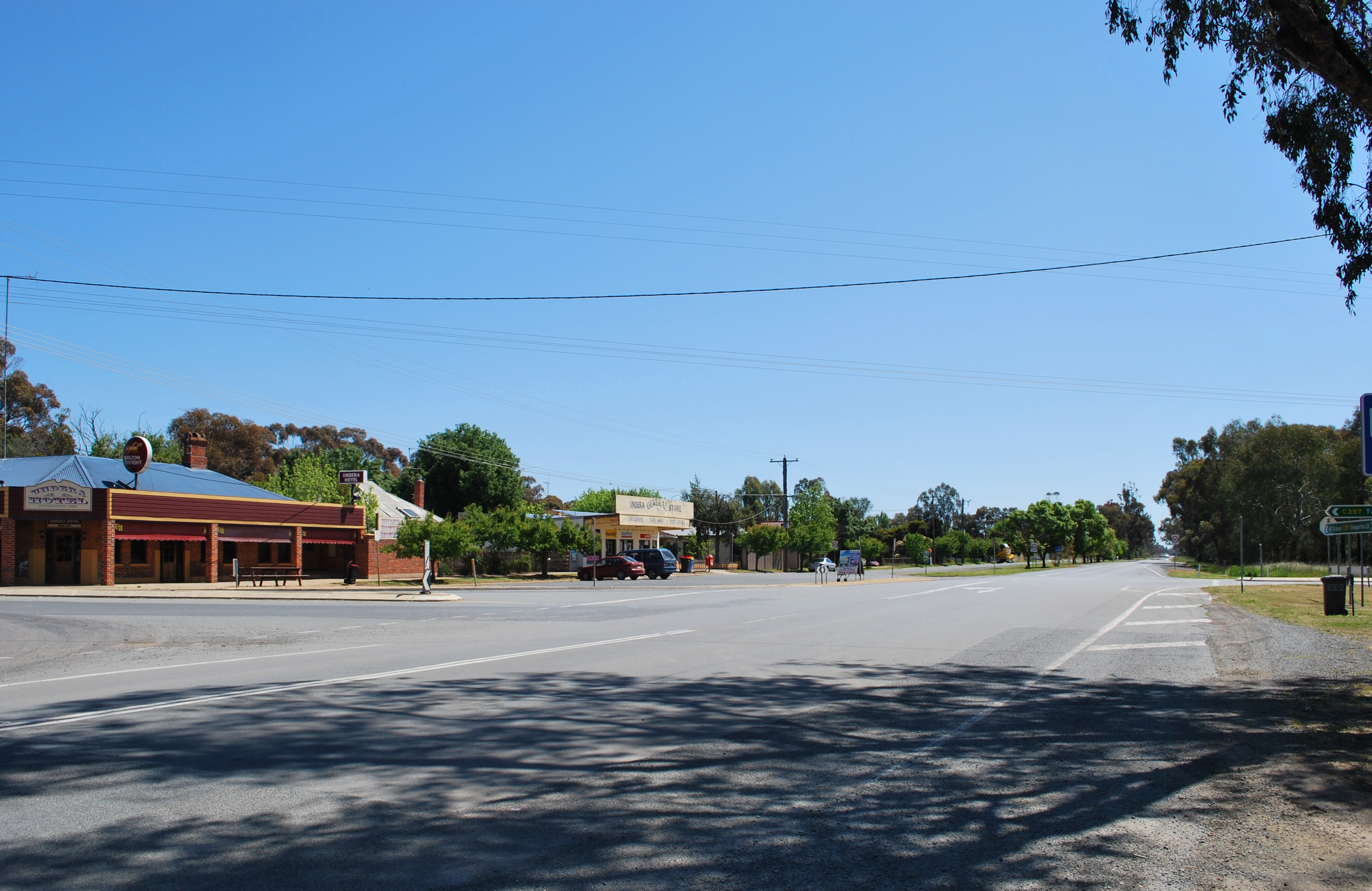
- Main street of Undera with the pub and general store on the left, 2012

- Coordinates: 36°17′S 145°13′E
- Country: Australia
- State: Victoria
- Region: Hume
- LGA: City of Greater Shepparton
- Location: 211 km (131 mi) N of Melbourne; 26 km (16 mi) NW of Shepparton; 22 km (14 mi) E of Kyabram

Government
  - State electorate: Murray Plains
  - Federal division: Nicholls

Population
  - Total: 442 (2016 census)
- Postcode: 3629

Undera is a town in the Goulburn Valley region of northern Victoria, Australia. The town in the City of Greater Shepparton local government area, 211 kilometres (131 mi) north of the state capital, Melbourne and 26 kilometres (16 mi) north-west of the regional centre of Shepparton. At the 2011 census, Undera and the surrounding area had a population of 545, declining to 442 by 2016.

== History ==
In 1874, when the area came under farm-selection activity, a township was surveyed and named Undera, the Post Office opening on 24 August 1875.

It is thought that the name is derived from an Aboriginal word, most likely meaning fat. Before being named Undera, the area was known as Mundoona. A school was opened in 1876, and Catholic and Presbyterian churches were opened the following year.

The Undera district extends northwards to Undera North and a westerly bend of the Goulburn River. Whilst the township is in the Goulburn Valley irrigation area, the northern parts sustained a local timber industry until the 1940s, and are mixed grazing and agricultural.

Undera has a school (21 pupils, 1998), a church, a memorial hall, (1928), a large reserve with a motorcycle track and a tennis court. The town has an Australian Rules football team competing in the Kyabram & District Football League.

Its census populations have been 95 (1911), 350 (1933) and 156 (1966).

== Sport ==
Undera is the home of the Undera Park Speedway, a 320 metres (350 yards) motorcycle speedway track located in the Undera Park Recreation Reserve (36°16′36″S 145°12′55″E). The venue has hosted many important events, including one of the rounds for the Australian Solo Championship.

It has also hosted the Australian Under-21 Championship, Australian Under-16 Championship, Australian Sidecar Championship, and the Victorian Individual Speedway Championship, U/21, U/16 and Sidecar Championships.
