= 2013 Premier League speedway season =

British motorcycle speedway season

- Champions: Somerset Rebels
- Knockout Cup: Somerset Rebels
- Individual: Oliver Allen
- Pairs: Somerset Rebels
- Fours: Edinburgh Monarchs
- Highest average: Craig Cook
- Division/s above: 2013 Elite League
- Division/s below: 2013 National League

The 2013 Premier League season was the second division of British speedway.

== Summary ==
The season took place between March and October 2013. The Scunthorpe Scorpions were the defending champions after winning in 2012. After finishing as runners-up the previous season, the Somerset Rebels went one better in 2013 and ended up being declared the Premier League Champions.

== League table ==
Pos	Club	M	Home				Away					F	A	Pts
Pos	Club	M	3W	2W	D	L	4W	3W	D	1L	L	F	A	Pts
1	Somerset Rebels	24	10	1	0	1	3	2	2	2	3	1218	951	56
2	Ipswich Witches	24	10	1	0	1	2	1	4	4	1	1193	987	55
3	Newcastle Diamonds	24	10	0	2	0	2	3	1	3	3	1207	973	54
4	Edinburgh Monarchs	24	10	0	0	2	2	2	2	3	3	1172	1003	51
5	Workington Comets	24	7	3	0	2	2	2	2	1	5	1139	1056	46
6	Redcar Bears	24	6	2	2	2	4	1	0	2	5	1078	1068	45
7	Leicester Lions	24	5	5	0	2	3	1	0	1	7	1079	1103	41
8	Scunthorpe Scorpions	24	4	5	2	1	0	2	1	4	5	1080	1075	36
9	Rye House Rockets	24	4	2	3	3	0	3	0	3	6	1050	1115	31
10	Berwick Bandits	24	5	3	0	4	0	1	0	1	10	1025	1150	25
11	Plymouth Devils	24	3	1	1	7	0	2	1	1	8	994	1190	21
12	Sheffield Tigers	24	3	1	2	6	0	0	1	1	10	958	1220	16
13	Glasgow Tigers	24	1	2	2	7	0	0	0	0	12	945	1247	9

Home: 3W = Home win by 7 points or more; 2W = Home win by between 1 and 6 points
Away: 4W = Away win by 7 points or more; 3W = Away win by between 1 and 6 points; 1L = Away loss by 6 points or less
M = Meetings; D = Draws; L = Losses; F = Race points for; A = Race points against; +/- = Race points difference; Pts = Total Points

== Fixtures & results ==
Home \ Away	BER	ED	GLA	IPS	LEI	NEW	PLY	RED	RYE	SCU	SHE	SOM	WOR
Berwick Bandits		46–44	53–42	48–45	52–40	41–49	56–37	44–45	48–44	54–36	51–42	38–52	44–46
Edinburgh Monarchs	51–39		62–30	59–36	52–37	41–52	56–36	46–47	58–34	56–36	45–32	49–41	61–34
Glasgow Tigers	44–46	42–48		36–56	40–49	46–44	62–31	48–42	43–47	45–45	45–45	44–46	40–50
Ipswich Witches	56–37	51–44	63–29		53–37	43–47	62–31	59–31	55–35	47–43	60–32	50–43	53–37
Leicester Lions	54–39	50–40	55–39	48–44		46–44	46–44	53–37	44–45	46–43	49–44	46–47	53–40
Newcastle Diamonds	62–31	49–41	60–30	45–45	62–30		64–29	58–37	60–30	50–39	66–29	45–45	51–41
Plymouth Devils	50–40	41–52	59–34	34–44	38–52	43–47		40–52	48–45	44–46	51–42	45–45	43–47
Redcar Bears	53–40	45–45	56–37	47–45	37–47	43–43	51–42		36–27	49–44	60–35	49–41	41–49
Rye House Rockets	56–36	45–45	60–33	45–45	48–45	44–46	44–46	40–50		50–40	53–42	50–44	45–45
Scunthorpe Scorpions	34–31	49–45	59–35	45–45	51–38	46–44	56–34	45–44	47–46		63–31	37–56	45–45
Sheffield Tigers	52–43	40–50	53–37	45–45	44–46	49–41	45–45	39–53	44–48	44–46		26–47	47–46
Somerset Rebels	57–34	44–46	53–37	46–44	62–32	51–39	59–36	58–33	61–29	49–41	68–23		59–33
Workington Comets	59–34	46–44	65–27	43–47	58–36	53–39	44–46	50–40	54–40	47–44	62–33	45–44	

Legend: Blue = home team win; Yellow = draw; Red = away team win.

== Play Offs ==
Group 1

Pos	Team	P	3w	2w	D	L	4w	3w	D	1L	L	F	A	Pts
1	Edinburgh	4	2	0	0	0	1	0	0	1	0	197	163	11
2	Workington	4	1	1	0	0	0	1	0	0	1	182	178	8
3	Ipswich	4	0	0	0	2	0	0	0	0	2	161	199	0

Group 2

Pos	Team	P	3w	2w	D	L	4w	3w	D	1L	L	F	A	Pts
1	Somerset	4	2	0	0	0	0	1	0	0	1	198	169	9
2	Newcastle	4	2	1	0	0	0	0	0	0	2	187	182	6
3	Redcar	4	1	0	0	1	0	0	0	0	2	168	202	5

== Play Off final ==
First leg

25 October 2013

Edinburgh Monarchs Craig Cook 14 Claus Vissing 8 Derek Sneddon 8 Theo Pijper 7 Liam Carr 3 Max Fricke 3 Jozsef Tabaka 2	45 – 43	Somerset Rebels Josh Grajczonek 12 Jason Doyle 11 Charles Wright 7 Nick Morris 5 Kyle Newman 4 Alex Davies 4 Lewis Rose 0

Armadale Stadium

Second leg

28 October 2013

Somerset Rebels Jason Doyle 11 Josh Grajczonek 9 Alex Davies 8 Kyle Newman 7 Charles Wright 6 Nick Morris 6 Oliver Greenwood 2	49 – 44	Edinburgh Monarchs Craig Cook 14 Claus Vissing 12 Derek Sneddon 6 Theo Pjiper 6 Liam Carr 3 Max Fricke 3 Jozsef Tabaka R/R

Oaktree Arena

Somerset were declared League Champions, winning on aggregate 92–89.

== Premier League Knockout Cup ==
The 2013 Premier League Knockout Cup was the 46th edition of the Knockout Cup for tier two teams. Somerset Rebels were the winners of the competition.

First round

Date	Team one	Score	Team two
28/04	Newcastle	42-30	Plymouth
27/04	Workington	61-29	Ipswich
26/04	Plymouth	44-46	Newcastle
25/04	Ipswich	55-35	Workington
21/04	Glasgow	52-38	Rye House
20/04	Rye House	63-26	Glasgow
18/04	Redcar	45-44	Berwick
13/04	Leicester	46-44	Edinburgh
13/04	Berwick	44-46	Redcar
12/04	Edinburgh	58-31	Leicester

Quarter-finals

Date	Team one	Score	Team two
05/07	Somerset	48-41	Workington
16/06	Newcastle	44-46	Edinburgh
16/06	Workington	48-42	Somerset
14/06	Edinburgh	44-45	Newcastle
14/06	Scunthorpe	41-49	Redcar
13/06	Redcar	50-40	Scunthorpe
16/05	Sheffield	42-48	Rye House
11/05	Rye House	52-38	Sheffield

Semi-finals

Date	Team one	Score	Team two
31/08	Rye House	55-35	Redcar
30/08	Edinburgh	49-41	Somerset
27/08	Somerset	49-41	Edinburgh
11/07	Redcar	48-42	Rye House
20/09 replay	Edinburgh	48-42	Somerset
18/09 replay	Somerset	58-32	Edinburgh

== Final ==
First leg

27 September 2013

Somerset Rebels Jason Doyle 18 Josh Grajczonek 13 Nicolai Klindt 11 Charles Wright 10 Kyle Newman 6 Oliver Greenwood 1 Nick Morris R/R	59 – 31	Rye House Rockets Olly Allen 9 Jason Bunyan 8 Anders Mellgren 6 Pontus Aspgren 4 Kasper Lykke 3 Josh Bates 1 Tyson Nelson R/R

Oaktree Arena

Second leg

6 October 2013

Rye House Rockets Anders Mellgren 10 Tyson Nelson 8 Olly Allen 7 Pontus Aspgren 7 Jason Bunyan 7 Ben Morley 4 Kasper Lykke 3	46 – 44	Somerset Rebels Jason Doyle 12 Josh Grajczonek 10 Charles Wright 9 Nick Morris 6 Alex Davies 4 Kyle Newman 2 Oliver Greenwood 1

Rye House Stadium

Somerset were declared Knockout Cup Champions, winning on aggregate 103–77.

== Riders' Championship ==
Oliver Allen won the Riders' Championship. The final was held on 22 September at Owlerton Stadium.

Pos.	Rider	Pts	Total	SF	Final
1	(England) Oliver Allen	2 2 2 3 2	11	3	3
2	(Sweden) Magnus Karlsson	3 3 3 2 3	14	-	2
3	(Australia) Jason Doyle	2 3 3 2 3	13	-	1
4	(England) Craig Cook	1 2 3 3 2	11	2	0
5	(Australia) Nick Morris	3 1 0 3 2	9	1	
6	(Denmark) René Bach	1 1 2 2 3	9	0	
7	(England) Richard Lawson	0 3 1 2 2	8		
8	(Sweden) Sebastian Aldén	3 0 3 1 0	7		
9	(United States) Ricky Wells	3 2 0 1 1	7		
10	(England) Richie Worrall	0 2 1 3 1	7		
11	(Australia) Dakota North	1 3 1 1 1	7		
12	(Australia) Mark Lemon	0 1 2 1 2	6		
13	(Netherlands) Theo Pijper	2 0 2 0 0	4		
14	(Australia) Micky Dyer	1 1 f 0 1	3		
15	(England) Josh Auty	2 0 ex fx	2		
16	(England) Oliver Greenwood (res)	1 0	1		
17	(Denmark) Morten Risager	0 0 fx ns	0		
18	(England) Max Clegg (res)	0 0	0		

- f=fell, r-retired, ex=excluded, ef=engine failure t=touched tapes

== Pairs ==
The Premier League Pairs Championship was held at Oaktree Arena on 31 May. The event was won by Somerset Rebels.

Group A
Pos	Team	Pts	Riders
1	Somerset	22	Doyle 14, Grajczonek 8
2	Scunthorpe	18	Auty 9, Howe 9
3	Ipswich	18	Barker 14, Lanham 4
4	Glasgow	16	Screen 12, Wright 4
5	Berwick	16	Aspegren 8, Smith 8

Group B
Pos	Team	Pts	Riders
1	Workington	24	Lawson 12, Bach 12
2	Edinburgh	21	Cook 15, Vissing 6
3	Leicester	18	Bjerre 11, Doolan 7
4	Sheffield	15	Wells 11, Hall 4
5	Plymouth	12	Gathercole 10, Lemon 2

Semi finals

- Somerset bt Edinburgh 5–4
- Scunthorpe bt Workington 5–4

Final

- Somerset bt Scunthorpe 7–2

== Fours ==
Edinburgh Monarchs won the Premier League Four-Team Championship, held on 14 July 2013, at the East of England Arena.

Group A
Pos	Team	Pts	Riders
1	Berwick	15	Ashworth 5, Smith 4, Wethers 3, Bellego 3, Aspegren 0
2	Ipswich	12	Barker 5, Risager 3, Tungate 2, Lanham 2
3	Workington	11	Lawson 5, Bach 4, Harrison 2, Aarnio 0
4	Scunthorpe	10	Auty 5, Howe 3, Jorgensen 1, Palm Toft 1

Group B
Pos	Team	Pts	Riders
1	Somerset	14	Morris 4, Davies 4, Grajczonek 3, Newman 3
2	Edinburgh	13	Cook 6, Vissing 3, Pjiper 3, Tabaka 1, Sneddon 0
3	Newcastle	11	Robson 6, Tully 4, Worrall R 1, Lindgren 0
4	Leicester	10	Nieminen 4, Bjerre 3, Karlsson 2, Doolan 1

Final
Pos	Team	Pts	Riders
1	Edinburgh	21	Vissing 8, Cook 6, Sneddon 3, Pjiper 2, Tabaka 2
2	Ipswich	18	Lanham 6, Tungate 4, Barker 3, Risager 3, Heeps 2
3	Somerset	17	Morris 6, Grajczonek 5, Davies 4, Newman 2
4	Berwick	16	Smith 7, Bellego 6, Wethers 2, Ashworth 1

== Final Leading averages ==
Rider	Team	Average
(England) Craig Cook	Edinburgh	10.83
(Australia) Jason Doyle	Somerset	10.23
(Australia) Nick Morris	Somerset	9.18
(England) Simon Stead	Sheffield	9.16
(Denmark) Mikkel Bech Jensen	Plymouth	9.02
(England) Richie Worrall	Newcastle	8.94
(England) Ben Barker	Ipswich	8.93
(England) Richard Lawson	Workington	8.84
(Sweden) Magnus Karlsson	Leicester	8.77
(Australia) Josh Grajczonek	Somerset	8.70

== Riders & final averages ==
Berwick

- (Australia) Matthew Wethers 7.37
- (Australia) Kozza Smith 7.21
- (France) David Bellego 7.16
- (Sweden) Robin Aspgren 6.43
- (Sweden) Sebastian Aldén 6.34
- (England) Ricky Ashworth 5.94
- (Denmark) Nicki Barrett 5.00
- (Sweden) Alex Edberg 4.22
- (England) Paul Starke 4.05

Edinburgh

- (England) Craig Cook 10.83
- (Netherlands) Theo Pijper 7.59
- (Denmark) Claus Vissing 7.33
- (Hungary) József Tabaka 7.30
- (Scotland) Derek Sneddon 6.27
- (Australia) Max Fricke 6.19
- (England) Liam Carr 3.63
- (Australia) Mitchell Davey 2.79
- (England) James Sarjeant 2.09

Glasgow

- (England) Joe Screen 8.39
- (Australia) Dakota North 7.50
- (Scotland) James Grieves 6.82
- (England) James Wright 6.11
- (Denmark) Henning Bager 5.83
- (Denmark) Anders Thomsen 4.74
- (England) Andre Compton 4.47
- (England) Joe Jacobs 4.06
- (Australia) Joey Ringwood 3.77
- (Australia) Harley Horwood 3.02

Ipswich

- (England) Ben Barker 8.93
- (Australia) Rohan Tungate 8.26
- (Australia) Cameron Heeps 7.64
- (Denmark) Morten Risager 7.50
- (England) Leigh Lanham 7.46
- (England) Ritchie Hawkins 5.29
- (England) Adam Ellis 4.82
- (Finland) Jari Makinen 0.89

Leicester

- (Sweden) Magnus Karlsson 8.77
- (Denmark) Lasse Bjerre 8.46
- (Australia) Kevin Doolan 8.15
- (Finland) Kauko Nieminen 7.59
- (Denmark) Jan Graversen 5.82
- (Sweden) Alex Edberg 5.33
- (England) Lewis Blackbird 4.73
- (Denmark) Simon Nielsen 4.34
- (Australia) Robert Branford 3.45
- (England) James Sarjeant 2.53

Newcastle

- (England) Richie Worrall 8.94
- (Sweden) Anton Rosén 8.35
- (England) Stuart Robson 8.11
- (Sweden) Ludvig Lindgren 8.01
- (Scotland) Andrew Tully 7.67
- (Australia) Christian Henry 7.55
- (England) Lewis Kerr 7.28
- (England) Chris Schramm 5.31
- (England) Steve Worrall 3.24

Plymouth

- (Denmark) Mikkel Bech 9.02
- (Australia) Ty Proctor 7.80
- (Australia) Cory Gathercole 7.28
- (Australia) Mark Lemon 7.16
- (Denmark) Rasmus Jensen 6.56
- (Australia) Todd Kurtz 5.82
- (Sweden) Ricky Kling 4.70
- (England) Jake Anderson 4.57
- (Denmark) Michael Palm Toft 4.30
- (England) Chris Schramm 3.94

Redcar

- (Australia) Micky Dyer 8.29
- (Australia) Aaron Summers 7.87
- (Denmark) Ulrich Ostergaard 7.29
- (Australia) Hugh Skidmore 6.53
- (England) Carl Wilkinson 6.06
- (Czech Republic) Matej Kus 5.03
- (Germany) Max Dilger 4.26
- (Australia) Mitchell Davey 3.50
- (England) Steve Worrall 3.16

Rye House

- (England) Jason Garrity 8.55
- (England) Oliver Allen 8.12
- (Sweden) Anders Mellgren 7.77
- (Sweden) Pontus Aspgren 7.52
- (Australia) Tyson Nelson 7.17
- (New Zealand) Jason Bunyan 6.60
- (England) Ben Morley 5.25
- (Denmark) Kasper Lykke 4.91
- (England) Simon Lambert 3.08

Scunthorpe

- (England) Josh Auty 8.42
- (England) Ashley Birks 7.72
- (Denmark) Nicolai Klindt 7.43
- (Denmark) Thomas Jørgensen 6.93
- (England) David Howe 6.72
- (England) Lewis Blackbird 5.66
- (Australia) Ryan Douglas 5.34
- (Denmark) Michael Palm Toft 5.01

Sheffield

- (England) Simon Stead 9.16
- (United States) Ricky Wells 8.45
- (England) Richard Hall 6.97
- (England) Adam Roynon 5.66
- (England) Joe Haines 5.35
- (England) Andre Compton 4.71
- (Argentina) Facundo Albin 4.13
- (Australia) Damien Koppe 2.94
- (England) Jake Knight 2.40

Somerset

- (Australia) Jason Doyle 10.23
- (Australia) Nick Morris 9.18
- (Australia) Josh Grajczonek 8.70
- (England) Alex Davies 7.67
- (England) Charles Wright 6.68
- (England) Kyle Newman 5.58
- (England) Stefan Nielsen 5.47
- (England) Simon Lambert 3.67
- (England) Tom Perry 3.64
- (England) Oliver Greenwood 2.71

Workington

- (England) Richard Lawson 8.84
- (Denmark) Rene Bach 8.45
- (Australia) Rusty Harrison 7.40
- (England) Kyle Howarth 7.08
- (Finland) Tero Aarnio 6.67
- (England) Ashley Morris 4.94
- (England) Chris Mills 3.83

== See also ==
- List of United Kingdom Speedway League Champions
- Knockout Cup (speedway)
