= 2014 Premier League speedway season =

British motorcycle speedway season

- Champions: Edinburgh Monarchs
- Knockout Cup: Edinburgh Monarchs
- Premier League Cup: Edinburgh Monarchs
- Individual: Simon Stead
- Pairs: Edinburgh Monarchs
- Fours: Somerset Rebels
- Highest average: Craig Cook
- Division/s above: 2014 Elite League
- Division/s below: 2014 National League

The 2014 Premier League was the second division of British speedway.

== Summary ==
The season took place between March and October 2014. The Somerset Rebels were the defending champions after winning in 2013. This season saw a change to the line-up of teams, with the Peterborough Panthers dropping down from the Elite League and replacing the Leicester Lions who moved up to take Peterborough's place in the Elite League.

Edinburgh Monarchs, led by Craig Cook and Sam Masters won the treble of League, Knockout Cup and League Cup, while going on a 27 match unbeaten run. Masters and Max Fricke also won the Premier Pairs.

== Final League table ==
Pos	Club	M	Home				Away					F	A	Pts
Pos	Club	M	3W	2W	D	L	4W	3W	D	1L	L	F	A	Pts
1	Edinburgh Monarchs	28	14	0	0	0	4	4	2	0	4	1465	1108	74
2	Somerset Rebels	28	14	0	0	0	4	2	0	3	5	1339	1083	67
3	Ipswich Witches	28	11	0	3	0	3	2	0	3	6	1339	1212	57
4	Berwick Bandits	28	10	3	0	1	4	1	0	1	8	1282	1247	56
5	Scunthorpe Scorpions	28	11	2	0	1	2	1	0	2	9	1310	1267	50
6	Workington Comets	27	9	2	1	2	1	1	0	2	9	1191	1241	41
7	Peterborough Panthers	28	7	4	1	2	1	0	0	3	10	1228	1300	37
8	Newcastle Diamonds	28	9	1	1	3	0	0	1	4	9	1277	1272	36
9	Plymouth Devils	28	10	1	0	3	0	0	0	2	12	1224	1304	34
10	Redcar Bears	28	4	5	0	5	1	0	1	3	9	1194	1303	31
11	Glasgow Tigers	27	6	3	0	4	1	0	1	1	11	1145	1314	31
12	Sheffield Tigers	28	5	4	0	5	0	0	1	0	13	1164	1363	25
13	Rye House Rockets	28	8	0	0	6	0	0	0	1	13	1164	1418	25

Home: 3W = Home win by 7 points or more; 2W = Home win by between 1 and 6 points
Away: 4W = Away win by 7 points or more; 3W = Away win by between 1 and 6 points; 1L = Away loss by 6 points or less
M = Meetings; D = Draws; L = Losses; F = Race points for; A = Race points against; +/- = Race points difference; Pts = Total Points

== 'A' Fixtures & results ==
Home \ Away	BER	ED	GLA	IPS	NEW	PET	PLY	RED	RYE	SCU	SHE	SOM	WOR
Berwick Bandits		48–41	55–41	49–41	55–38	35–52	52–41	32–28	63–32	47–46	59–33	49–43	55–37
Edinburgh Monarchs	57–32		58–32	56–36	57–38	51–42	61–31	59–37	57–38	59–34	67–27	55–39	63–29
Glasgow Tigers	37–52	43–47		53–40	46–43	47–45	46–44	51–39	48–41	53–37	55–40	41–51	52–41
Ipswich Witches	60–34	45–45	45–45		45–45	55–40	58–36	41–34	52–38	53–39	54–36	57–35	60–36
Newcastle Diamonds	51–40	44–45	59–34	46–44		52–41	61–34	39–50	54–38	67–22	53–40	54–38	44–49
Peterborough Panthers	52–38	50–43	46–44	47–43	54–40		51–31	45–45	49–40	45–44	58–38	43–50	42–36
Plymouth Devils	43–52	40–52	53–41	52–41	48–42	52–38		50–41	54–41	55–40	59–37	38–40	47–37
Redcar Bears	42–50	41–51	51–42	40–50	47–43	47–43	52–40		48–42	50–40	53–37	47–43	47–45
Rye House Rockets	58–37	36–59	49–41	44–46	49–41	57–35	49–40	55–41		59–35	52–38	37–58	34–56
Scunthorpe Scorpions	62–34	43–48	57–36	55–39	58–38	58–36	52–43	54–39	60–35		54–39	46–44	53–37
Sheffield Tigers	48–42	45–47	52–41	42–51	50–40	46–44	32–30	40–38	52–38	41–49		39–51	52–40
Somerset Rebels	56–34	57–35	62–30	59–31	59–35	59–25	58–34	68–24	66–26	55–35	49–40		64–28
Workington Comets	41–49	53–43	40–54	47–43	50–45	52–40	51–42	51–41	63–31	49–41	50–43	40–32	

Legend: Blue = home team win; Yellow = draw; Red = away team win.

== 'B' Fixtures & results ==
4 extra random matches per team were held counting towards the league standings

Home \ Away	BER	ED	GLA	IPS	NEW	PET	PLY	RED	RYE	SCU	SHE	SOM	WOR
Berwick Bandits					52–31			52–43					
Edinburgh Monarchs			65–29		48–41								
Glasgow Tigers		36–54											ab
Ipswich Witches						59–36			55–40				
Newcastle Diamonds	51–37	42–42											
Peterborough Panthers				42–47			47–35						
Plymouth Devils						56–40						54–40	
Redcar Bears	42–48									44–46			
Rye House Rockets				42–49								44–49	
Scunthorpe Scorpions								46–43			55–39		
Sheffield Tigers										41–49			52–40
Somerset Rebels							52–42		72–20				
Workington Comets			48–27								45–45		

Legend: Blue = home team win; Yellow = draw; Red = away team win.

== Play Offs ==
Group 1

Pos	Team	P	3w	2w	D	L	4w	3w	D	1L	L	F	A	Pts
1	Edinburgh	4	2	0	0	0	1	1	0	0	0	212	158	13
2	Workington	4	1	0	0	1	0	0	0	0	2	172	196	3
3	Berwick	4	1	0	0	1	0	0	0	0	2	170	200	3

Group 2

Pos	Team	P	3w	2w	D	L	4w	3w	D	1L	L	F	A	Pts
1	Somerset	4	2	0	0	0	0	0	0	1	1	202	166	7
2	Ipswich	4	2	0	0	0	0	0	0	0	2	191	177	6
3	Scunthorpe	4	1	0	0	0	0	0	0	0	2	157	207	5

== Final ==
First leg

24 October 2014

Somerset Rebels Charles Wright 13 Pontus Aspgren 12 Nick Morris 10 Paul Starke 8 Todd Kurtz 6 Edward Kennett (guest) 5 Brady Kurtz R/R	54 – 42	Edinburgh Monarchs Craig Cook 15 Sam Masters 14 Max Fricke 7 Justin Sedgman 3 Aaron Fox 2 Derek Sneddon 1 Steve Worrall R/R

Oaktree Arena

Second leg

25 October 2014

Edinburgh Monarchs Craig Cook 14 Justin Sedgman 12 Max Fricke 11 Sam Masters 10 Aaron Fox 4 Derek Sneddon 3 Steve Worrall R/R	54 – 41	Somerset Rebels Paul Starke 10 Nick Morris 9 Pontus Aspgren 8 Aaron Summers (guest) 6 Charles Wright 4 Todd Kurtz 4 Brady Kurtz R/R

Armadale Stadium

Edinburgh were declared League Champions, winning on aggregate 96–95.

== Premier League Knockout Cup ==
The 2014 Premier League Knockout Cup was the 47th edition of the Knockout Cup for tier two teams. Edinburgh Monarchs were the winners of the competition.

First round

Date	Team one	Score	Team two
26/06	Sheffield	45-45	Berwick
15/06	Glasgow	53-37	Rye House
14/06	Rye House	50-40	Glasgow
26/05	Scunthorpe	46-44	Peterborough
20/05	Peterborough	46-43	Scunthorpe
09/05	Somerset	60-30	Workington
08/05	Redcar	47-43	Plymouth
03/05	Berwick	54-36	Sheffield
03/05	Workington	52-38	Somerset
25/04	Plymouth	49-41	Redcar

Quarter-finals

Date	Team one	Score	Team two
28/09	Glasgow	35-55	Newcastle
15/09	Newcastle	53-37	Glasgow
25/07	Edinburgh	67-23	Berwick
23/07	Berwick	51-39	Edinburgh
03/06	Peterborough	46-44	Plymouth
06/06	Plymouth	50-40	Peterborough
13/06	Somerset	49-41	Ipswich
05/06	Ipswich	65-25	Somerset

Semi-finals

Date	Team one	Score	Team two
12/10	Newcastle	44-46	Edinburgh
10/10	Edinburgh	62-27	Newcastle
26/09	Plymouth	47-43	Ipswich
11/09	Ipswich	65-25	Plymouth

== Final ==
First leg

16 October 2014

Ipswich Witches Adam Ellis 9 Cameron Heeps 8 Ritchie Hawkins 7 Rohan Tungate 5 Morten Risager 5 Richie Worrall 3 Gino Manzares 0	37 – 53	Edinburgh Monarchs Craig Cook 15 Max Fricke 13 Sam Masters 13 Justin Sedgman 8 Aaron Fox 3 Derek Sneddon 1 Steve Worrall R/R

Foxhall Stadium

Second leg

17 October 2014

Edinburgh Monarchs Craig Cook 13 Max Fricke 12 Sam Masters 11 Justin Sedgman 10 Aaron Fox 6 Joe Jacobs 0 Steve Worrall R/R	52 – 38	Ipswich Witches Cameron Heeps 12 Richie Worrall 11 Adam Ellis 8 Ritchie Hawkins 4 Rohan Tungate 3 Morten Risager 0 Gino Manzares R/R

Armadale Stadium

Edinburgh were declared Knockout Cup Champions, winning on aggregate 105–75.

== Riders' Championship ==
Simon Stead won the Riders' Championship. The final was held on 21 September at Owlerton Stadium.

Pos.	Rider	Pts	Total	SF	Final
1	(England) Simon Stead	3 3 3 3 1	13	-	3
2	(England) Danny King	3 3 2 3 3	14	-	2
3	(Denmark) Ulrich Østergaard	1 1 3 2 3	10	2	1
4	(England) Richard Lawson	3 3 1 3 1	11	3	0
5	(England) Stuart Robson	2 2 2 2 2	10	1	
6	(England) Craig Cook	3 1 2 1 3	10	0	
7	(Denmark) Lasse Bjerre	1 2 0 2 3	8		
8	(England) Kyle Newman	1 2 2 0 2	7		
9	(England) Jason Garrity	2 1 1 1 1	6		
10	(Netherlands) Theo Pijper	2 1 1 2 0	6		
11	(Czech Republic) Matěj Kůs	0 2 1 3 0	6		
12	(Australia) Nick Morris	0 0 3 1 2	6		
13	(Australia) Josh Grajczonek	2 3 0 0	4		
14	(England) Steve Worrall	1 0 0 0 2	3		
15	(Australia) Ryan Douglas	0 fx 3 0	3		
16	(Denmark) Morten Risager	0 0 0 1 1	2		
17	(England) Nathan Greaves (res)	0	0		
18	(England) James Sarjeant (res)	0	0		

- f=fell, r-retired, ex=excluded, ef=engine failure t=touched tapes

== Pairs ==
The Premier League Pairs Championship was held at Oaktree Arena on 11 July. The event was won by Edinburgh Monarchs.

Group A
Pos	Team	Pts	Riders
1	Workington	21	Grajczonek 13, Bach 8
2	Redcar	21	Lawson 13, Summers 8
3	Peterborough	20	Bjerre 13, Ostergaard 7
4	Ipswich	17	Tungate 8, Risager 8
5	Newcastle	11	Robson 6 Kerr 5

Group B
Pos	Team	Pts	Riders
1	Somerset	25	Allen 13, Morris 12
2	Edinburgh	20	Masters 11, Fricke 9
3	Sheffield	17	Stead 10, Lanham 7
4	Berwick	15	Bellego 9, Vissing 6
5	Plymouth	13	Newman 10, Jensen 3

Semi finals

- Somerset bt Workington 7–2
- Edinburgh bt Redcar 7–2

Final

- Edinburgh bt Somerset 5–4

== Fours ==
Somerset Rebels won the Premier League Four-Team Championship, held on 3 August 2014, at the East of England Arena.

Group A
Pos	Team	Pts	Riders
1	Somerset	14	Allen 5, Morris 4, Aspgren 3, Kurtz B 2
2	Scunthorpe	13	Jorgensen 5, Douglas 4, Howe 2, Birks 2
3	Peterborough	11	Bjerre 3, Ostergaard 3, Blackbird 3, Dryml 2
4	Newcastle	10	King 5, Kerr 2, Robson 2, Lindgren 1

Group B
Pos	Team	Pts	Riders
1	Edinburgh	14	Masters 5, Sedgmen 5, Cook 4, Worrall S 0
2	Workington	14	Grajczonek 5, Bach 3, Wells 3, Howarth 2 Campton 1
3	Redcar	11	Lawson 4, Wilkinson 3, Skidmore 2, Summers 2
4	Berwick	9	Bellego 3, Kus 3, Doolan 2, Vissing 1, Wethers 0

Final
Pos	Team	Pts	Riders
1	Somerset	24	Allen 8, Morris 7, Aspgren 5, Wright 4, Kurtz B 0
2	Workington	18	Grajczonek 7, Bach 6, Howarth 4, Wells 1
3	Scunthorpe	15	Howe 6, Douglas 4, Birks 3, Jorgensen 2
4	Edinburgh	15	Worrall S 5, Sedgmen 4, Masters 3, Cook 3,

== Final Leading averages ==
Rider	Team	Average
(England) Craig Cook	Edinburgh	10.41
(England) Simon Stead	Sheffield	9.70
(England) Ben Barker	Plymouth	9.48
(England) Danny King	Newcastle	9.34
(England) Richard Lawson	Redcar	9.31
(Australia) Sam Masters	Edinburgh	9.12
(Denmark) Lasse Bjerre	Peterborough	9.02
(England) Oliver Allen	Somerset	8.83
(Australia) Max Fricke	Edinburgh	8.76
(England) Edward Kennett	Rye House	8.70

== Riders & final averages ==
Berwick

- (Denmark) Claus Vissing 8.11
- (Czech Republic) Matěj Kůs 7.67
- (Australia) Kevin Doolan 7.24
- (France) David Bellego 6.83
- (Australia) Matthew Wethers 6.64
- (Denmark) Steen Jensen 6.31
- (Sweden) Alex Edberg 4.94
- (England) Liam Carr 2.61

Edinburgh

- (England) Craig Cook 10.41
- (Australia) Sam Masters 9.12
- (Australia) Max Fricke 8.76
- (England) Steve Worrall 8.67
- (Australia) Justin Sedgmen 8.31
- (Scotland) Derek Sneddon 5.44
- (United States) Aaron Fox 4.00

Glasgow

- (Netherlands) Theo Pijper 7.31
- (Australia) Rusty Harrison 6.97
- (Denmark) Anders Thomsen 6.53
- (Germany) Kevin Wolbert 6.28
- (Denmark) Kasper Lykke 5.64
- (Australia) Mark Lemon 5.21
- (France) Dimitri Berge 5.20
- (Finland) Tero Aarnio 5.00
- (Sweden) Victor Palovaara 2.53

Ipswich

- (England) Richie Worrall 8.06
- (Australia) Rohan Tungate 8.00
- (Denmark) Morten Risager 7.98
- (United States) Gino Manzares 6.84
- (England) Ritchie Hawkins 6.29
- (Australia) Cameron Heeps 6.14
- (England) Adam Ellis 6.10

Newcastle

- (England) Danny King 9.34
- (England) Stuart Robson 8.59
- (England) Lewis Kerr 7.81
- (Sweden) Ludvig Lindgren 7.41
- (Sweden) Anton Rosén 6.98
- (Australia) Christian Henry 6.59
- (England) Lewis Rose 5.28
- (England) Chris Mills 4.90
- (Denmark) Simon Nielsen 4.41
- (England) Chris Schramm 4.39

Peterborough

- (Denmark) Lasse Bjerre 9.02
- (Denmark) Ulrich Østergaard 8.40
- (United States) Ryan Fisher 8.00
- (Czech Republic) Aleš Dryml, Jr. 7.90
- (England) Lewis Blackbird 7.17
- (England) Adam Roynon 5.85
- (England) Nicki Barrett 4.71
- (England) Joe Jacobs 4.31
- (England) Oliver Greenwood 4.06
- (England) Richard Hall 3.80
- (Germany) Max Dilger 3.14

Plymouth

- (England) Ben Barker 9.48
- (England) Kyle Newman 7.18
- (Finland) Kalle Katajisto 6.81
- (Denmark) Rasmus Jensen 6.80
- (Czech Republic) Zdeněk Simota 6.41
- (England) James Wright 5.97
- (Hungary) Josef Franc 5.84
- (Hungary) Roland Benko 3.73
- (England) Ben Reade 1.53

Redcar

- (England) Richard Lawson 9.31
- (Australia) Aaron Summers 8.02
- (Australia) Hugh Skidmore 7.23
- (Australia) Mark Lemon 6.07
- (England) Carl Wilkinson 5.99
- (Denmark) Jan Graversen 5.41
- (England) Luke Crang 3.03
- (Poland) Rafal Konopka 2.89

Rye House

- (England) Edward Kennett 8.70
- (England) Jason Garrity 7.10
- (England) Steve Boxall 6.33
- (France) Mathieu Trésarrieu 5.81
- (Sweden) Anders Mellgren 5.33
- (England) Luke Bowen 5.32
- (New Zealand) Jason Bunyan 5.32
- (England) Oliver Greenwood 4.25
- (England) Simon Lambert 1.50

Scunthorpe

- (England) David Howe 7.85
- (Denmark) Nikolai Klindt 7.54
- (England) Josh Auty 7.49
- (Denmark) Thomas Jørgensen 7.14
- (Australia) Ryan Douglas 7.13
- (England) Ashley Birks 6.71
- (England) Matt Williamson 2.21

Sheffield

- (England) Simon Stead 9.70
- (England) Andre Compton 6.28
- (Australia) Taylor Poole 6.15
- (Australia) Ty Proctor 5.96
- (England) Leigh Lanham 5.60
- (England) Ben Wilson 5.54
- (Italy) Nicolas Covatti 4.84
- (England) Simon Nielsen 4.28
- (England) Josh Bates 3.91

Somerset

- (England) Oliver Allen 8.83
- (Australia) Nick Morris 8.34
- (Sweden) Pontus Aspgren 8.19
- (England) Charles Wright 7.74
- (Australia) Brady Kurtz 7.55
- (Australia) Todd Kurtz 6.79
- (England) Paul Starke 5.93

Workington

- (Australia) Josh Grajczonek 9.04
- (Denmark) Rene Bach 7.88
- (United States) Ricky Wells 7.49
- (England) Kyle Howarth 6.79
- (Australia) Mason Campton 5.76
- (England) Simon Lambert 5.54
- (England) Ashley Morris 5.54
- (England) Joe Jacobs 4.58
- (England) Chris Mills 3.24

== See also ==
- List of United Kingdom Speedway League Champions
- Knockout Cup (speedway)
