= 2006 Premier League speedway season =

British motorcycle speedway season

- League: Premier League
- Champions: King's Lynn Stars
- Knockout Cup: King's Lynn Stars
- Premier Trophy: King's Lynn Stars
- Individual: Magnus Zetterström
- Pairs: Glasgow Tigers
- Fours: Workington Comets
- Highest average: Magnus Zetterström
- Division/s above: 2006 Elite League
- Division/s below: 2006 Conference League

The 2006 Premier League speedway season was the second division of speedway in the United Kingdom and governed by the Speedway Control Bureau (SCB), in conjunction with the British Speedway Promoters' Association (BSPA).

== Season summary ==
The League consisted of 14 teams for the 2005 season after the Reading Racers elected to compete in the Elite League and the closure of the Exeter Falcons and the Hull Vikings. The Mildenhall Fen Tigers elected to enter the Premier League along with the newly founded Redcar Bears.

King's Lynn Stars won the league title.

== League ==
=== Final table ===
		Home			Away						Bonus			
Pos	Team	M	W	D	L	W	D	L	F	A	Pts	W	L	Tot
1	King's Lynn Stars	26	13	0	0	6	2	5	1409	990	40	13	0	53
2	Sheffield Tigers	26	11	1	1	5	0	8	1291	1101	33	11	2	44
3	Glasgow Tigers	26	13	0	0	3	1	9	1240	1173	33	9	4	42
4	Rye House Rockets	26	12	0	1	4	0	9	1250	1147	32	8	5	40
5	Somerset Rebels	26	11	0	2	2	1	10	1243	1156	27	9	4	36
6	Redcar Bears	26	11	0	2	2	1	10	1220	1194	27	6	7	33
7	Workington Comets	26	10	0	3	3	0	10	1210	1199	26	7	6	33
8	Isle of Wight Islanders	26	12	0	1	1	0	12	1180	1210	26	7	6	33
9	Newcastle Diamonds	26	12	1	0	0	0	13	1129	1249	25	5	8	30
10	Stoke Potters	26	10	0	3	2	0	11	1127	1265	24	4	9	28
11	Berwick Bandits	26	8	1	4	2	0	11	1140	1274	21	5	8	26
12	Edinburgh Monarchs	26	8	2	3	0	0	13	1138	1270	18	2	11	20
13	Mildenhall Fen Tigers	26	6	1	6	2	0	11	1116	1264	17	2	11	19
14	Newport Wasps	26	6	0	7	1	1	11	1087	1288	15	3	10	18

=== Fixtures and results ===
Home \ Away	BER	ED	GLA	IOW	KL	MFT	ND	NW	RED	RYE	SHE	SOM	STO	WOR
Berwick Bandits		58–37	51–44	44–46	46–51	50–40	51–45	47–47	50–41	54–42	43–47	55–40	49–44	41–49
Edinburgh Monarchs	61–34		45–45	56–35	45–45	44–46	51–45	53–37	53–39	42–47	52–44	57–36	52–40	44–46
Glasgow Tigers	53–37	49–44		52–38	50–46	60–36	55–40	52–38	53–42	59–35	49–44	50–40	61–32	54–41
Isle of Wight Islanders	53–42	55–41	49–45		50–40	51–42	57–35	50–40	50–40	64–29	44–46	43–41	60–32	52–42
King's Lynn Stars	66–27	61–33	62–28	63–31		52–41	62–31	64–26	70–22	64–28	62–33	56–39	66–26	63–30
Mildenhall Fen Tigers	42–48	52–41	49–44	49–44	45–47		51–41	55–39	45–45	44–48	44–46	40–50	51–44	44–46
Newcastle Diamonds	49–44	50–42	50–40	52–40	46–44	48–32		53–37	49–42	47–42	47–46	45–45	49–41	53–39
Newport Wasps	41–49	62–31	44–46	47–43	39–54	45–44	46–44		47–49	43–51	45–44	43–47	44–52	58–35
Redcar Bears	64–26	56–38	59–36	51–42	44–49	57–38	49–43	39–51		47–43	48–42	54–39	56–40	59–36
Rye House Rockets	65–27	55–37	54–40	50–43	44–46	53–40	69–21	64–28	54–40		53–40	56–38	65–27	49–41
Sheffield Tigers	56–39	61–31	57–39	62–29	45–45	63–27	60–32	63–30	49–41	60–35		48–45	44–45	53–42
Somerset Rebels	53–39	59–34	58–36	54–42	51–39	42–48	57–37	58–35	57–41	53–41	44–49		58–34	50–40
Stoke Potters	56–37	47–43	38–55	53–39	47–43	63–29	47–42	50–36	42–53	43–47	46–43	46–44		54–41
Workington Comets	50–43	57–39	44–46	63–30	43–49	53–42	60–35	51–39	52–42	59–31	44–46	48–45	58–38	

Legend: Blue = home team win; Yellow = draw; Red = away team win.

=== Play-offs ===
Aggregate scores over two legs.

Quarter-finals

- King's Lynn Stars 110-75 Redcar Bears
- Sheffield Tigers 97-86 Workington Comets
- Isle of Wight Islanders 97-91 Glasgow Tigers
- Rye House Rockets 94-88 Somerset Rebels

Semi-finals

- Sheffield Tigers 103-85 Isle of Wight Islanders
- King's Lynn Stars 102-83 Rye House Rockets

Final

- King's Lynn Stars 100-82 Sheffield Tigers

== Premier League Knockout Cup ==
The 2006 Premier League Knockout Cup was the 39th edition of the Knockout Cup for tier two teams. King's Lynn Stars were the winners of the competition for the second successive year.

First round

Date	Team one	Score	Team two
31/05	King's Lynn	70-20	Berwick
20/05	Berwick	47-43	King's Lynn
27/05	Workington	54-40	Newcastle
28/05	Newcastle	55-40	Workington
20/05	Rye House	66-36	Isle of Wight
16/05	Isle of Wight	53-41	Rye House
19/05	Somerset	57-38	Stoke
20/05	Stoke	51-41	Somerset
27/06	Newport	55-31	Edinburgh
19/05	Edinburgh	56-40	Newport

Quarter-finals

Date	Team one	Score	Team two
21/06	King's Lynn	54-41	Rye House
24/06	Rye House	49-44	King's Lynn
23/06	Somerset	52-44	Mildenhall
25/06	Mildenhall	40-53	Somerset
25/06	Glasgow	55-41	Newcastle
26/06	Newcastle	48-42	Glasgow
06/07	Sheffield	59-33	Newport
09/07	Newport	39-51	Sheffield

Semi-finals

Date	Team one	Score	Team two
10/09	Glasgow	45-45	King's Lynn
20/09	King's Lynn	67-27	Glasgow
15/09	Somerset	55-40	Sheffield
28/09	Sheffield	55-41	Somerset

'Final

First leg

6 October 2006

Somerset Rebels Magnus Zetterström 15 Emil Kramer 7 Simon Walker 7 Stephan Katt 6 Ben Barker 4 Glenn Cunningham 3 Glen Phillips 3	45 – 45	King's Lynn Stars Troy Batchelor 11 Kevin Doolan 9 Chris Holder (guest) 9 Daniel Nermark] 5 John Oliver 7 Chris Mills 4 Trevor Harding 1

Oaktree Arena

Second leg

11 October 2006

King's Lynn Stars Daniel Nermark 11 Kevin Doolan 11 John Oliver 10 Jason Lyons (guest) 9 Troy Batchelor 8 Chris Mills 8 Trevor Harding 5	62 – 32	Somerset Rebels Emil Kramer 12 Magnus Zetterström 7 Glenn Cunningham 7 Simon Walker 4 Glen Phillips 1 Stephan Katt 1 Ben Barker 0

King's Lynn Stadium

King's Lynn were declared Knockout Cup Champions, winning on aggregate 107–77.

== Premier Trophy ==
North Group

Pos	Team	P	W	D	L	Pts
1	Workington	14	10	1	3	27
2	Sheffield	14	8	0	6	22
3	Glasgow	14	8	0	6	21
4	Edinburgh	14	8	0	6	21
5	Newcastle	14	6	0	8	17
6	Stoke	14	5	0	9	12
7	Redcar	14	5	0	9	11
8	Berwick	14	4	1	9	9

South Group

Pos	Team	P	W	D	L	Pts
1	Rye House	10	6	0	4	16
2	King's Lynn	10	5	0	5	15
3	Somerset	10	6	0	4	14
4	Mildenhall	10	5	1	4	14
6	Newport	10	4	1	5	9
7	Isle of Wight	10	3	0	7	7

Home \ Away	BER	ED	GLA	NEW	RED	SHE	STO	WOR
Berwick		51–42	44–46	42–48	53–43	46–44	46–44	45–45
Edinburgh	61–34		48–44	51–44	52–40	54–39	58–36	44–45
Glasgow	57–38	49–44		54–36	58–36	51–44	56–36	44–46
Newcastle	51–44	46–47	53–42		53–42	53–38	54–41	47–46
Redcar	54–39	45–44	46–44	51–44		44–46	48–43	42–49
Sheffield	58–37	52–40	54–41	64–30	56–36		57–38	57–38
Stoke	58–37	44–49	44–51	45–44	49.5–43.5	48–42		56–37
Workington	63–29	41–34	51–45	50–40	50–43	50–45	64–28	

Legend: Blue = home team win; Yellow = draw; Red = away team win.

Home \ Away	IOW	KL	MIL	NWP	RYE	SOM
Isle of Wight		64–32	56–34	61–34	43–50	34–59
King's Lynn	67–26		48–42	52–44	65–28	51–43
Mildenhall	58–34	49–44		49–40	46–44	54–41
Newport	47–42	48–45	45–45		47–46	51–44
Rye House	52–20	50–40	50–40	58–38		59–34
Somerset	62–31	38–34	50–43	55–40	55–40	

Legend: Blue = home team win; Yellow = draw; Red = away team win.

Semi-final

Team one	Team two	Score
Workington	King's Lynn	51–39, 35–59
Sheffield	Rye House	61–31, 31+–61

+Sheffield won run-off

Final

Team one	Team two	Score
King's Lynn	Sheffield	63–32, 45–48

== Final leading averages ==
Rider	Team	Average
(Sweden) Magnus Zetterström	Somerset	10.52
(England) Gary Havelock	Redcar	10.10
(England) Andre Compton	Sheffield	9.94
(Australia) Shane Parker	Glasgow	9.91
(Czech Republic) Tomáš Topinka	Kings Lynn	9.80
(Australia) Kevin Doolan	Kings Lynn	9.30
(Australia) Jason Lyons	Mildenhall	9.24
(England) Danny Bird	Glasgow	9.10
(Sweden) Daniel Nermark	Kings Lynn	9.07
(Australia) Mark Lemon	Stoke	9.03

== Riders' Championship ==
Magnus Zetterström won the Riders' Championship. The final was held on 24 September at Owlerton Stadium.

Pos.	Rider	Pts	Total	SF	Final
1	(Sweden) Magnus Zetterström	3 3 2 3 3	14	-	3
2	(Australia) Jason Lyons	3 2 2 3 3	13	-	2
3	(England) Gary Havelock	2 2 3 2 3	12	2	1
4	(Czech Republic) Tomáš Topinka	0 3 3 2 3	11	3	0
5	(Australia) Chris Holder	2 3 1 3 1	10	1	
6	(England) Danny Bird	1 2 3 3 0	9	0	
7	(England) Andre Compton	1 3 3 - -	7		
8	(Czech Republic) Josef Franc	3 1 2 0 1	7		
9	(England) James Wright	2 0 1 2 2	7		
10	(Australia) Mark Lemon	0 0 2 2 2	6		
11	(England) Chris Neath	2 2 0 0 2	6		
12	(Australia) Shane Parker	3 1 0 1 1	6		
13	(Czech Republic) Michal Makovský	1 1 1 1 1	5		
14	(Australia) Kevin Doolan	1 0 0 1 2	4		
15	(Scotland) William Lawson	0 1 1 0 r	2		
16	(England) Carl Wilkinson	ex 0 0 0 0	0		
17	(England) Tai Woffinden (res)	1	1		
18	(England) David Speight (res)	0 0	0		

- f=fell, r-retired, ex=excluded, ef=engine failure t=touched tapes

== Pairs ==
The Premier League Pairs Championship was held at Ashfield Stadium on 8 October (originally abandoned on 18 June). The event was won by Glasgow for the second consecutive season.

Group A
Pos	Team	Pts	Riders
1	Newcastle	25	Franc 14, Stancl 11
2	Sheffield	21	Wilson 13, Ashworth 8
3	King's Lynn	21	Nermark 13, Doolan 8
4	Edinburgh	12	Lawson 9, Sneddon 3
5	Glasgow B	11	McAllan 6, Ksiezak 5

Group B
Pos	Team	Pts	Riders
1	Somerset	26	Zetterstrom 13, Kramer 13
2	Glasgow	20	Bird 12, Parker 8
3	Workington	17	Wright 12, Piszcz 5
4	Stoke	15	Lemon 8, Thorp 7
5	Mildenhall	12	Lyons 12, Armstrong 0

Semi finals

- Glasgow bt Newcastle 5–4
- Sheffield bt Somerset 6–3

Final

- Glasgow bt Sheffield 6–3

== Fours ==
Workington Comets won the Premier League Four-Team Championship for the third time. The event was held at Derwent Park on 7 October, after originally being postponed from 19 August.

Group A
Pos	Team	Pts	Riders
1	Sheffield	20	Legault 6, Ashworth 6, Wilson 5, Compton 3
2	King's Lynn	11	Hardin 4, Doolan 3, Nermark 2, Mills 2
3	Rye House	9	Robson 3, Kennett 3, Allen 2, Boxall 1
4	Newcastle	8	Henry 3, Franc 3, Stancl 2, Robertson 0

Group B
Pos	Team	Pts	Riders
1	Workington	19	Stead 5, Wright 5, Piszcz 5, Harrison 1
2	Somerset	12	Zetterstrom 6, Kramer 4, Cunningham 1, Katt 1
3	Glasgow	10	Bird 4, Partker 3, McAllan 2, Dicken 1
4	Mildenhall	7	Werner 5, King 2, Lyons 1, Armstrong 0

Final
Pos	Team	Pts	Riders
1	Workington	22	Wright 7, Stead 5, Piszcz 4, Harrison 4
2	Somerset	21	Zetterstrom 9, Kramer 5, Cunningham 4, Katt 3
3	Sheffield	16	Compton 5, Legault 4, Wilson 4, Ashworth 3
4	King's Lynn	12	Doolan 6, Nermark 4, Milsl 2, Harding 0

== Riders & final averages ==
Berwick

- Michal Makovský 8.06
- Jacek Rempala 7.66
- Adrian Rymel 7.14
- Stanisław Burza 7.11
- Lee Smethills 6.86
- Andreas Bergström 6.65
- Craig Branney 5.94
- David Meldrum 4.28
- Danny Warwick 3.36

Edinburgh

- Theo Pijper 8.22
- Matthew Wethers 7.56
- William Lawson 7.42
- Rusty Harrison 7.41
- Henrik Møller 6.57
- Derek Sneddon 6.19
- Daniele Tessari 4.00
- Sean Stoddart 2.90

Glasgow

- Shane Parker 9.91
- Danny Bird 9.10
- Kauko Nieminen 7.96
- Robert Ksiezak 5.72
- James Cockle 4.82
- David McAllan 4.56
- Lee Dicken 3.91

Isle of Wight

- Chris Holder 8.80
- Jason Doyle 7.57
- Krzysztof Stojanowski 7.20
- Jason Bunyan 6.92
- Ray Morton 6.60
- Krister Marsh 5.15
- Chris Johnson 5.03
- Nick Simmons 3.50

King's Lynn

- Tomáš Topinka 9.80
- Kevin Doolan 9.30
- Daniel Nermark 9.07
- Troy Batchelor 8.34
- Trevor Harding 6.40
- Chris Mills 6.07
- John Oliver 5.56
- Simon Lambert 4.91

Mildenhall

- Jason Lyons 9.24
- Danny King 8.40
- Jon Armstrong 6.78
- Brent Werner 6.15
- Shaun Tacey 5.91
- Jason King 5.68
- James Brundle 4.50
- Jordan Frampton 3.48
- Barry Burchatt 2.47

Newcastle

- Josef Franc 8.34
- George Štancl 8.21
- James Grieves 7.76
- Christian Henry 7.37
- Jamie Robertson 4.93
- Manuel Hauzinger 4.73
- Adam McKinna 1.91

Newport

- Craig Watson 8.44
- Carl Wilkinson 6.99
- Neil Collins 6.88
- Chris Schramm 6.29
- Tony Atkin 6.08
- Joel Parsons 5.59
- Billy Legg 1.57
- Sam Hurst 0.83

Redcar

- Gary Havelock 10.10
- Mathieu Trésarrieu 7.57
- Tomáš Suchánek 6.35
- Kevin Little 6.34
- Daniel Giffard 6.03
- Chris Kerr 5.20
- Richard Juul 4.76
- Jack Hargreaves 4.00

Rye House

- Steve Boxall 8.80
- Edward Kennett 8.73
- Chris Neath 8.38
- Tommy Allen 6.35
- Luke Bowen 5.53
- Ross Brady 5.40
- Ben Powell 5.18
- Lee Smethills 5.06
- Adam Roynon 4.78
- Jamie Courtney 4.31
- Danny Betson 3.69

Sheffield

- Andre Compton 9.94
- Ricky Ashworth 8.59
- Ben Wilson 8.11
- Emiliano Sanchez 7.71
- Kyle Legault 7.62
- Paul Cooper 4.39
- Benji Compton 3.61

Somerset

- Magnus Zetterström 10.52
- Emil Kramer 7.73
- Glenn Cunningham 7.33
- Paul Fry 7.20
- Stephan Katt 6.67
- Ben Barker 5.19
- Glen Phillips 5.19
- Simon Walker 5.03

Stoke

- Mark Lemon 9.03
- Paul Thorp 8.07
- Robbie Kessler 7.80
- Paul Clews 6.45
- Alan Mogridge 6.21
- Trent Leverington 5.08
- Barrie Evans 4.58
- Luke Priest 3.82

Workington

- James Wright 8.58
- Garry Stead 8.47
- Rusty Harrison 8.07
- Paul Thorp 7.60
- Ritchie Hawkins 7.44
- Tomasz Piszcz 7.37
- Alan Mogridge 6.75
- Aidan Collins 5.57
- Lee Derbyshire 2.05
- John Branney 1.85

== See also ==
- List of United Kingdom Speedway League Champions
- Knockout Cup (speedway)
