= 2007 Premier League speedway season =

British motorcycle speedway season

- League: Premier League
- Champions: Rye House Rockets
- Knockout Cup: King's Lynn Stars
- Premier Trophy: King's Lynn Stars
- Young Shield: Redcar Bears
- Individual: James Wright
- Pairs: Isle of Wight Islanders
- Fours: Isle of Wight Islanders
- Highest average: Magnus Zetterström
- Division/s above: 2007 Elite League
- Division/s below: 2007 Conference League

The 2007 Premier League speedway season was the second division of speedway in the United Kingdom and governed by the Speedway Control Bureau (SCB), in conjunction with the British Speedway Promoters' Association (BSPA).

== Season summary ==
The League consisted of 15 teams for the 2007 season with the addition of the Birmingham Brummies from the 2006 season.

The top four teams at the time of the fixture cut-off date to compete for the championship in the play-offs. Birmingham Brummies were in fifth place at the time of the fixture cut-off date, therefore the Isle of Wight Islanders qualified for the play-offs. Teams finishing in fifth to twelfth at the time of the fixture cut-off date compete in the Young Shield.

Rye House Rockets won the title.

== League ==
=== Final table ===
Key:
Premier League Play-Offs

Pos	Club	M	Home			Away			F	A	BP	Pts
Pos	Club	M	W	D	L	W	D	L	F	A	BP	Pts
1	Kings Lynn Stars	28	14	0	0	6	1	7	1399	1162	11	52
2	Birmingham Brummies*	28	12	0	2	7	1	6	1345	1215	9	48
3	Rye House Rockets	28	14	0	0	3	0	11	1448	1113	13	47
4	Sheffield Tigers	28	14	0	0	4	0	10	1356	1206	11	47
5	Isle of Wight Islanders	28	13	0	1	4	0	10	1385	1176	11	45
6	Somerset Rebels	28	12	0	2	4	0	10	1328	1233	10	42
7	Workington Comets	28	12	1	1	3	0	11	1300	1251	8	39
8	Glasgow Tigers	28	12	0	2	4	0	10	1284	1276	6	38
9	Redcar Bears	28	10	1	3	2	0	12	1252	1320	5	30
10	Newcastle Diamonds	28	11	1	2	1	0	13	1202	1365	2	27
11	Stoke Potters	28	9	0	5	1	1	12	1212	1316	5	26
12	Mildenhall Fen Tigers	28	9	0	5	1	1	12	1218	1347	5	26
13	Edinburgh Monarchs	28	9	0	5	2	0	12	1214	1350	4	26
14	Newport Wasps	28	9	0	5	1	0	13	1163	1369	5	25
15	Berwick Bandits	28	3	1	10	0	0	14	1067	1474	0	7

=== Fixtures and results ===
Home \ Away	BER	BIR	ED	GLA	IOW	KL	MT	ND	NW	RED	RYE	SHE	SOM	STO	WOR
Berwick Bandits		40–52	35–55	43–48	44–46	44–46	45–45	48–44	32–61	50–43	51–41	43–46	41–49	42–48	45–48
Birmingham Brummies	59–33		63–29	53–39	48–42	43–46	58–34	57–36	62–27	53–42	39–53	47–42	49–41	53–40	46–44
Edinburgh Monarchs	60–32	48–44		41–49	52–42	43–47	53–40	43–46	59–33	40–50	50–45	53–40	48–41	58–36	44–49
Glasgow Tigers	62–28	43–46	55–38		52–40	51–42	57–35	55–38	49–42	48–47	49–40	50–43	40–49	43–41	49–42
Isle of Wight Islanders	62–31	60–33	67–24	59–32		42–47	60–33	57–35	69–21	50–40	50–40	59–32	59–34	48–42	56–39
King's Lynn Stars	64–28	49–44	60–33	52–40	61–26		48–45	55–38	56–36	61–32	49–43	64–29	56–36	64–26	52–41
Mildenhall Fen Tigers	54–39	42–48	51–41	43–47	51–43	50–42		53–40	54–39	47–45	44–49	43–46	45–48	49–44	47–44
Newcastle Diamonds	57–36	43–47	46–44	50–44	49–45	45–45	48–42		50–40	38–55	47–43	48–43	48–41	50–43	49–41
Newport Wasps	38–35	42–48	42–47	54–38	39–50	48–44	48–42	52–40		55–38	43–50	43–46	48–42	49–44	51–42
Redcar Bears	49–41	42–53	52–41	51–41	35–55	44–49	51–42	53–40	48–42		47–43	45–43	47–46	45–45	48–42
Rye House Rockets	63–27	53–39	68–22	57–35	69–21	50–40	65–25	65–26	68–23	49–42		55–37	56–37	66–26	58–37
Sheffield Tigers	62–31	57–36	59–31	56–38	53–40	55–37	52–38	57–36	54–38	52–41	56–37		55–37	51–39	61–32
Somerset Rebels	59–35	58–32	57–35	56–36	46–44	44–46	50–39	55–38	61–29	53–40	51–42	41–53		52–38	52–41
Stoke Potters	60–31	45–48	51–42	43–51	52–40	53–37	40–50	55–38	46–43	45–44	47–43	55–35	42–48		34–56
Workington Comets	53–37	45–45	50–40	47–43	42–53	53–40	57–35	51–39	55–37	56–36	53–37	49–41	51–44	40–32	

Legend: Blue = home team win; Yellow = draw; Red = away team win.

*Birmingham Brummies were in fifth place at the time of the fixture cut-off date, therefore the Isle of Wight Islanders qualified for the play-offs.

=== Play-offs ===
Aggregate scores over two legs.

Semi-finals

- Rye House Rockets 105-75 Isle of Wight Islanders
- Sheffield Tigers 99-86 King's Lynn Stars

Final

- Rye House Rockets 111-74 Sheffield Tigers

== Premier League Knockout Cup ==
The 2007 Premier League Knockout Cup was the 40th edition of the Knockout Cup for tier two teams. King's Lynn Stars were the winners of the competition for the third successive year.

First round

Date	Team one	Score	Team two
30/04	Rye House	50-41	Mildenhall
03/06	Mildenhall	40-49	Rye House
22/04	Newcastle	50-40	Kings Lynn
25/04	Kings Lynn	64-29	Newcastle
25/04	Birmingham	49-41	Newport
29/04	Newport	51-39	Birmingham
03/05	Sheffield	57-36	Edinburgh
04/05	Edinburgh	60-33	Sheffield
04/05	Somerset	52-38	Glasgow
06/05	Glasgow	48-45	Somerset
05/05	Berwick	51-42	Stoke
06/05	Stoke	57-35	Berwick
19/05	Workington	50-42	Isle of Wight
22/05	Isle of Wight	52-43	Workington

Quarter-finals

Date	Team one	Score	Team two
25/05	Edinburgh	48-41	Somerset
11/07	Somerset	58-32	Edinburgh
31/05	Redcar	45-45	Kings Lynn
06/06	Kings Lynn	59-33	Redcar
02/06	Stoke	49-41	Newport
03/06	Newcastle	50-40	Stoke
26/06	Isle of Wight	52-40	Rye House
11/08	Rye House	50-43	Isle of Wight

Semi-finals

Date	Team one	Score	Team two
24/08	Kings Lynn	49-44	Isle of Wight
18/09	Isle of Wight	45-45	Kings Lynn
07/10	Newport	50-42	Somerset
12/10	Somerset	61-32	Newport

=== Final ===
First leg

19 October 2007

Somerset Rebels Chris Holder (guest) 9 Stephan Katt 9 Emil Kramer 8 Simon Walker 6 Danny Warwick 6 Richie Hawkins 4 Jordan Frampton 2	44 – 46	King's Lynn Stars Daniel Nermark 14 Tomáš Topinka 12 Chris Mills 7 Trevor Harding 5 Paul Lee 5 Simon Lambert 2 Adam Allott 1

Oaktree Arena

Second leg

24 October 2007

King's Lynn Stars Tomáš Topinka 15 Simon Lambert 11 Daniel Nermark 10 Trevor Harding 10 Adam Allott 7 Paul Lee 6 Chris Mills 0	59 – 34	Somerset Rebels Ricky Ashworth (guest) 11 Stephan Katt 9 Richie Hawkins 5 Emil Kramer 5 Danny Warwick 3 Jordan Frampton 1 Magnus Zetterström R/R

King's Lynn Stadium

King's Lynn were declared Knockout Cup Champions, winning on aggregate 105–78.

== Premier Trophy ==
North Group

Pos	Team	P	W	D	L	Pts
1	Glasgow	8	6	0	2	12
2	Redcar	8	5	0	3	10
3	Newcastle	8	4	0	4	8
4	Edinburgh	8	3	0	5	6
5	Berwick	8	2	0	6	4

South Group

Pos	Team	P	W	D	L	Pts
1	Rye House	8	6	0	2	12
2	Isle of Wight	8	5	0	3	10
3	Mildenhall	8	4	0	4	8
4	Somerset	8	3	0	5	6
5	Newport	8	2	0	6	4

Midlands Group

Pos	Team	P	W	D	L	Pts
1	King's Lynn	8	5	2	1	12
2	Birmingham	8	5	1	2	11
3	Sheffield	8	4	1	3	9
4	Workington	8	4	0	4	8
5	Stoke	8	0	0	8	0

Home \ Away	BER	ED	GLA	NEW	RED
Berwick		52–38	44–46	50–40	44–46
Edinburgh	47–25		47–42	47–42	44–46
Glasgow	61–29	47–43		59–34	56–37
Newcastle	58–34	50–41	43–47		53–39
Redcar	58–35	51–42	53–38	42–48	

Legend: Blue = home team win; Yellow = draw; Red = away team win.

Home \ Away	IOW	MIL	NWP	RYE	SOM
Isle of Wight		62–30	62–31	55–39	47–43
Mildenhall	47–46		52–34	45–44	54–38
Newport	41–48	49–41		36–57	53–37
Rye House	56–37	66–23	65–27		55–38
Somerset	52–42	52–41	65–25	41–49	

Legend: Blue = home team win; Yellow = draw; Red = away team win.

Home \ Away	BIR	KL	SHE	STO	WOR
Birmingham		45–45	52–41	50–34	48–41
King's Lynn	59–33		75–15	63–27	65–27
Sheffield	62–31	45–45		65–25	66–26
Stoke	44–46	37–52	42–47		35–55
Workington	40–53	47–43	49–41	68–24	

Legend: Blue = home team win; Yellow = draw; Red = away team win.

Semi-final

Team one	Team two	Score
King's Lynn	Glasgow	55–39, 44–49
Rye House	Birmingham	52–38, 35–58

Final

Team one	Team two	Score
Birmingham	King's Lynn	39–51, 35–58

== Young Shield ==
- End of season competition

First Round

Team one	Team two	Score
Mildenhall	Birmingham	43–47, 46–44
Redcar	Glasgow	49–41, 47–43
Somerset	Stoke	58–34, 33–59
Workington	Newcastle	58–35, 45–46

Semi-final

Team one	Team two	Score
Birmingham	Stoke	54–37, 43–46
Redcar	Workington	50–40, 43–47

Final

Team one	Team two	Score
Redcar	Birmingham	49–41, 46–43

== Riders' Championship ==
James Wright won the Riders' Championship. The final was held on 30 September at Abbey Stadium.

Pos.	Rider	Pts	Total	SF	Final
1	(England) James Wright	3 3 2 3 3	14	-	3
2	(Australia) Jason Lyons	3 3 2 2 3	13	-	2
3	(Poland) Jacek Rempała	0 1 3 2 3	9	2	1
4	(Sweden) Daniel Nermark	2 2 3 3 3	13	3	0
5	(Czech Republic) Tomáš Topinka	1 3 2 3 1	10	1	
6	(Australia) Chris Holder	2 3 3 1 2	11	0	
7	(England) Tai Woffinden	1 1 3 1 1	7		
8	(Finland) Kaj Laukkanen	3 2 ef 2 ex	7		
9	(Czech Republic) Josef Franc	2 1 1 1 2	7		
10	(United States) Chris Kerr	1 0 ex 3 2	6		
11	(England) Chris Schramm (res)	3 0 2 1 0	6		
12	(England) Lee Complin	1 2 ex 0 2	5		
13	(England) Andre Compton	0 0 1 2 1	4		
14	(Poland) Michał Rajkowski	2 2 0 0 0	4		
15	(Sweden) Emil Kramer	0 1 0 0 1	2		
16	(Australia) Trent Leverington	0 0 1 0 0	1		

- f=fell, r-retired, ex=excluded, ef=engine failure t=touched tapes

== Pairs ==
The Premier League Pairs Championship was held at Oaktree Arena on 29 June. The event was won by the Isle of Wight Islanders.

Group A
Pos	Team	Pts	Riders
1	Isle of Wight	24	Holder 16, Bunyan 8
2	Glasgow	22	Parker 12, Watson 10
3	Somerset	21	Zetterstrom 13, Kramer 8
4	Rye House	15	Neath 10, Allen 5
5	Sheffield	8	Ashworth 6, Compton 2

Group B
Pos	Team	Pts	Riders
1	Workington	24	Nieminen 15, Wright 9
2	Newcastle	21	Franc 13, Henry 8
3	King's Lynn	17	Nermark 9, Topinka 8
4	Birmingham	16	Ostergaard 12, Sanchez 4
5	Redcar	12	Havelock 10, Grieves 2

Semi finals

- Isle of Wight bt Newcastle 5–4
- Glasgow bt Workington 5–4

Final

- Isle of Wight bt Glasgow 6–3

== Fours ==
Isle of Wight Islanders won the Premier League Four-Team Championship, which was held on 8 July 2007, at the East of England Arena.

Group A
Pos	Team	Pts	Riders
1	King's Lynn	16	Nermark 5, Topinka 4, Mills 4, Lee 3
2	Somerset	15	Zetterstrom 4, Kramer 4, Hawkins 4, Frampton 3
3	Glasgow	11	Watson 5, Parker 3, McAllan 3, Dicken 0, Ksiezak 0
4	Sheffield	6	Wilson 4, Compton 1, Parsons 1, Cooper 0, Ashworth 0

Group B
Pos	Team	Pts	Riders
1	Isle Of Wight	16	Bunyan 6, Holder 5, Stojanowski 4, Phillips 1
2	Rye House	13	Boxall 5, Woffinden 3, Neath 3, Roynon 2, Allen 0
3	Birmingham	11	Lyons 5, Ostergaard 5, Sanchez 1, Armstrong 0, Powell 0
4	Workington	8	Wright J 3, Branney 3, Stonehewer 2, Wright C 0

Final
Pos	Team	Pts	Riders
1	Isle of Wight	38	Holder 12, Bunyan 9, Phillips 7, Gathercole 7, Stojanowski 3
2	Somerset	22	Zetterstrom 8, Kramer 6, Hawkins 5, Frampton 3
3	King's Lynn	21	Nermark 9, Topinka 5, Lee 5, Mills 2, Harding 0
4	Rye House	15	Woffinden 5, Boxall 4, Roynon 3, Neath 2, Allen 1

== Final leading averages ==
Rider	Team	Average
(Sweden) Magnus Zetterström	Somerset	10.79
(Australia) Chris Holder	Isle of Wight	10.69
(England) Andre Compton	Sheffield	10.43
(Australia) Shane Parker	Glasgow	10.03
(Sweden) Daniel Nermark	Kings Lynn	10.00
(England) Gary Havelock	Redcar	9.84
(Czech Republic) Tomáš Topinka	Kings Lynn	9.78
(Australia) Jason Lyons	Birmingham	9.68
(England) James Wright	Workington	9.53
(England) Carl Stonehewer	Workington	9.32

== Riders and final averages ==
Berwick

- Michal Makovský 7.56
- Stanisław Burza 7.27
- Jacek Rempala 7.07
- Andreas Bergstrom 6.41
- Sebastian Truminski 6.31
- Michael Coles 4.59
- David Meldrum 4.56
- Benji Compton 3.30
- Jamie Robertson 3.29
- Sam Martin 2.60

Birmingham

- Jason Lyons 9.68
- Ulrich Ostergaard 8.80
- Henning Bager 7.85
- Phil Morris 7.26
- Emiliano Sanchez 7.03
- Manuel Hauzinger 6.86
- Henrik Moller 6.54
- Ben Powell 5.75
- Lee Smart 5.13
- Brent Werner 4.70
- Aidan Collins 4.59
- Jon Armstrong 4.36

Edinburgh

- Kaj Laukkanen 8.50
- Ronnie Correy 8.17
- George Štancl 7.63
- Matthew Wethers 7.50
- William Lawson 7.41
- Henrik Møller 7.10
- Theo Pijper 6.47
- Derek Sneddon 6.39
- Daniele Tessari 5.60
- Andrew Tully 5.46
- Kalle Katajisto 1.60

Glasgow

- Shane Parker 10.03
- Craig Watson 8.43
- George Štancl 8.09
- Trent Leverington 6.81
- Robert Ksiezak 6.27
- David McAllan 5.94
- Lee Dicken 5.33
- Lee Smethills 4.30
- Michael Coles 3.88

Isle of Wight

- Chris Holder 10.69
- Jason Bunyan 8.60
- Krzysztof Stojanowski 7.57
- Glen Phillips 7.04
- Cory Gathercole 6.36
- Chris Johnson 5.28
- Andrew Bargh 3.97

King's Lynn

- Daniel Nermark 10.00
- Tomáš Topinka 9.78
- Paul Lee 7.41
- Trevor Harding 7.22
- Chris Mills 7.13
- James Brundle 5.97
- Simon Lambert 5.31
- Adam Allott 4.85
- Benji Compton 3.50

Mildenhall

- Kyle Legault 8.53
- Marián Jirout 7.09
- Tom P. Madsen 7.01
- Paul Fry 6.43
- Tomáš Suchánek 6.37
- Shaun Tacey 6.29
- Jason King 6.24
- Mark Baseby 3.77
- Mark Thompson 2.68

Newcastle

- Josef Franc 8.42
- Christian Henry 8.36
- Carl Wilkinson 7.04
- Jonas Raun 6.11
- Ross Brady 5.96
- Sean Stoddart 4.84
- Paul Clews 4.80
- Ashley Johnson 1.71
- Sam Dore 1.33

Newport

- Phil Morris 6.85
- Tony Atkin 6.82
- Chris Schramm 6.80
- Michał Rajkowski 6.68
- Sebastian Truminski 6.25
- Tom Hedley 5.93
- Nick Simmons 4.79
- Barry Burchatt 4.71
- Karl Mason 2.06

Redcar

- Gary Havelock 9.84
- James Grieves 9.09
- Robbie Kessler 8.36
- Josh Auty 7.28
- Mathieu Trésarrieu 7.15
- Chris Kerr 6.58
- Daniel Giffard 4.46
- Jamie Courtney 3.39
- Jack Hargreaves 3.04
- Rusty Hodgson 2.14
- Arlo Bugeja 1.60

Rye House

- Tai Woffinden 9.01
- Stefan Ekberg 8.98
- Stuart Robson 8.68
- Chris Neath 8.62
- Steve Boxall 8.38
- Tommy Allen 7.67
- Adam Roynon 7.24
- Robbie Kessler 6.49
- Luke Bowen 4.98

Sheffield

- Andre Compton 10.43
- Ricky Ashworth 8.50
- Ben Wilson 7.48
- Joel Parsons 6.32
- Paul Cooper 6.30
- James Birkinshaw 5.92
- James Cockle 4.27

Somerset

- Magnus Zetterström 10.79
- Emil Kramer 8.60
- Ritchie Hawkins 6.36
- Simon Walker 5.92
- Jordan Frampton 5.62
- Stephan Katt 5.20
- Danny Warwick 5.12
- Tomáš Suchánek 3.90

Stoke

- Glenn Cunningham 7.60
- Lee Complin 7.47
- Rusty Harrison 7.11
- Claus Vissing 6.87
- Garry Stead 6.75
- Ben Barker 6.69
- Barrie Evans 5.26
- Jack Hargreaves 4.37

Workington

- James Wright 9.53
- Carl Stonehewer 9.32
- Ulrich Østergaard 8.83
- Kauko Nieminen 8.72
- Craig Branney 6.16
- Jamie Robertson 4.28
- Charles Wright 4.18
- Mattia Carpanese 4.15
- John Branney 3.97

== See also ==
- List of United Kingdom Speedway League Champions
- Knockout Cup (speedway)
