= SGB Championship Pairs Championship =

British speedway event

SGB Championship Pairs formerly Premier League Pairs
- Sport: motorcycle speedway
- Founded: 1997
- Country: United Kingdom

Notes
- replaced the British League Division Two Pairs

The SGB Championship Pairs formerly the Premier League Pairs Championship (from 1997 to 2016) is a motorcycle speedway contest for the second tier teams in the United Kingdom to determine the Pairs champions. The teams consist of the top two riders from each club competing. The meetings comprise ten teams of two riders drawn into two qualifying groups.

== Rules ==
In the Qualification Heats, riders are allocated starting gates. For the Semi-Finals, the group winners have first choice of gate positions (A&C or B&D). Gate A is on the inside of the track, whilst Gate D is on the outside. For the Final, the gate positions (A&C and B&D) are decided by the toss of a coin.

All heats are scored as follows:*1st = 4pts, 2nd = 3pts, 3rd = 2pts, 4th = 0pts. This system is used to encourage team riding. A pair finishing first and second will score seven points, whereas a pair finishing first and last will score only four. Race points scored over all Qualification Heats are used to determine the final group placings. Where two are tied for a place, the team who scored most points scored in the heat where they met go through. Where more than two teams are tied for a place, the tie is resolved as follows: most wins- most second places - a ballot

== Past winners ==
Year	Winners	Runners-up	Ref
Premier League Pairs
1997	Long Eaton Invaders (Carl Stonehewer & Martin Dixon)	Reading Racers (Dave Mullett & Lee Richardson)	
1998	Peterborough Panthers (Glenn Cunningham & Brett Woodifield)	Exeter Falcons (Frank Smart & Michael Coles)	
1999	Workington Comets (Carl Stonehewer & Brent Werner)	Arena Essex Hammers (Colin White & Leigh Lanham)	
2000	Workington Comets (Carl Stonehewer & Mick Powell)	Isle of Wight Islanders (Ray Morton & Danny Bird)	
2001	Workington Comets (Carl Stonehewer & Peter Ingvar Karlsson)	Newcastle Diamonds (Jesper Olsen & Bjarne Pedersen)	
2002	Isle of Wight Islanders (Adam Shields & Danny Bird)	Newport Wasps (Frank Smart & Craig Watson)	
2003	Workington Comets (Carl Stonehewer & Simon Stead)	Newport Wasps (Frank Smart & Niels Kristian Iversen)	
2004	Reading Racers (Phil Morris & Danny Bird)	Stoke Potters (Paul Pickering & Alan Mogridge)	
2005	Glasgow Tigers (Shane Parker & George Štancl)	Somerset Rebels (Magnus Zetterström & Glenn Cunningham)	
2006	Glasgow Tigers (Shane Parker & Danny Bird)	Sheffield Tigers (Ben Wilson & Ricky Ashworth)	
2007	Isle of Wight Islanders (Chris Holder & Jason Bunyan)	Glasgow Tigers (Shane Parker & Craig Watson)	
2008	Workington Comets (Daniel Nermark & Kauko Nieminen)	Somerset Rebels (Jason Doyle & Emil Kramer)	
2009	Birmingham Brummies (Jason Lyons & Tomasz Piszcz)	Somerset Rebels (Steve Johnston & Emil Kramer)	
2010	Sheffield Tigers (Ricky Ashworth & Josh Auty)	Birmingham Brummies (Jason Lyons & Steve Johnston)	
2011	Glasgow Tigers (Joe Screen & James Grieves)	Workington Comets (James Wright & Rusty Harrison)	
2012	Workington Comets (Adam Roynon & Rene Bach)	Scunthorpe Scorpions (Thomas Jørgensen & Josh Auty)	
2013	Somerset Rebels (Jason Doyle & Josh Grajczonek)	Scunthorpe Scorpions (David Howe & Josh Auty)	
2014	Edinburgh Monarchs (Max Fricke & Sam Masters)	Somerset Rebels (Nick Morris & Oliver Allen)	
2015	Ipswich Witches (Danny King & Rohan Tungate)	Somerset Rebels (Brady Kurtz & Josh Grajczonek)	
2016	Somerset Rebels (Josh Grajczonek & Rohan Tungate)	Edinburgh Monarchs (Sam Masters & Ryan Fisher)	
SGB Championship Pairs
2017	Sheffield Tigers (Lasse Bjerre & Kyle Howarth)	Redcar Bears (Charles Wright & Ben Barker)	
2018	Sheffield Tigers (Charles Wright & Kyle Howarth)	Workington Comets (Ty Proctor & Nicolai Klindt)	
2019	Glasgow Tigers (Craig Cook & Rasmus Jensen)	Leicester Lions (Ryan Douglas & Scott Nicholls)	
	2020 & 2021 cancelled due to COVID-19		
2022	Redcar Bears (Charles Wright & Lewis Kerr)	Poole Pirates (Steve Worrall & Danny King)	
2023	Glasgow Tigers (Chris Harris & Benjamin Basso)	Redcar Bears (Charles Wright & Danny King)	
2024	Redcar Bears (Charles Wright & Danny King)	Oxford Cheetahs (Scott Nicholls & Sam Masters)	
2025	Redcar Bears (Charles Wright & Erik Riss)	Poole Pirates (Lewis Kerr & Zach Cook)	
2026	Oxford Cheetahs (Sam Masters & Anders Rowe)	Berwick Bandits (Peter Kildemand & Nick Morris)	

== See also ==
- List of United Kingdom Speedway Pairs champions
- Speedway in the United Kingdom
- Elite League Pairs Championship
