= Premier League Cup =

Premier League Cup may refer to:

== Association football ==
- FA Women's Premier League Cup
- Russian Premier League Cup
- Scottish Women's Premier League Cup
- Premier League Cup (football), an English youth tournament

== Motorcycle speedway ==
- Premier League Cup (speedway), a regional league competition contested by teams in the British Premier League
- Premier League Knockout Cup, a knock out competition contested by teams in the British Premier League
