= Paul Fry (speedway rider) =

British motorcycle speedway rider

- Born: 25 October 1964; Ledbury, Hereford, England
- Died: 1 April 2010 (aged 45)
- Nationality: British (English)

Career history
- 1984, 1986–1987: Cradley Heathens
- 1984: Arena Essex Hammers
- 1988, 1999: Stoke Potters
- 1989–1990: Long Eaton Invaders
- 1991: King's Lynn Stars
- 1992–1996: Exeter Falcons
- 1997–1998, 2009: Newport Wasps
- 2000–2003: Swindon Robins
- 2003: Peterborough Panthers
- 2004: Belle Vue Aces
- 2004–2006: Somerset Rebels
- 2007: Mildenhall Fen Tigers
- 2008: Isle of Wight Islanders

Team honours
- 1986 (shared), 1987: British League KO Cup Winner
- 1986 (shared): League Cup Winner
- 1987: Midland Cup Winner
- 2000: Premier League KO Cup Winner
- 2003, 2005: Premier League Fours Winner
- 2000: Young Shield Winner

Paul David Fry (25 October 1964 – 1 April 2010) was a motorcycle speedway rider from England.

== Career ==
Fry made his debut with the Cradley Heathens in 1984 and rode for a number of clubs during his career. He won several team trophies including the British League Knockout Cup with Cradley Heath in 1986 and 1987. He joined Exeter Falcons in 1992 and spent five seasons with them.

Fry won the Premier League Knockout Cup with the Swindon Robins in 2000.

In 2003, Fry was part of the Swindon four that won the Premier League Four-Team Championship, which was held on 27 July 2003, at the Abbey Stadium. He won the same event again two years later in 2005, when he was part of the Somerset Rebels four who won the Championship, held on 20 August 2005, at Derwent Park.

In 2007, Fry was awarded a testimonial meeting at Somerset's Oak Tree Arena. He spent his final season in 2009 with Premier league team Newport Wasps and briefly doubled-up with the Poole Pirates.

== Death ==
Fry died at his home in April 2010 aged 45. The cause of death was initially undisclosed. A later inquest disclosed he died from hypoxic brain injuries, caused by hanging.

== World Longtrack Championship ==
Finalist

1993 - (Germany) Mühldorf 5pts (15th).
