= Todd Kurtz =

Australian speedway rider

- Born: 4 November 1992 (age 34); Cowra, New South Wales, Australia
- Nationality: Australian

Career history
- 2010, 2011: Newport Wasps
- 2011: Coventry Bees
- 2012: Poole Pirates
- 2012, 2013, 2015, 2016: Plymouth Devils
- 2012: Peterborough Panthers
- 2013, 2017, 2019: Swindon Robins
- 2013: Lakeside Hammers
- 2014, 2017-2019: Somerset Rebels
- 2016-2018: Leicester Lions
- 2017-2019: Sheffield Tigers

Team honours
- 2016, 2019: UK tier 2 Fours

Todd William Kurtz (born 4 November 1992) is a speedway rider from Australia.

== Career ==
Kurtz won the 2008 Australian Under-16 Championship and is twice the Australian Longtrack Champion.

Kurtz joined Plymouth Devils in 2015, averaging 7.44. He was part of the Plymouth team (with his brother Brady) that won the Premier League Four-Team Championship, which was held on 23 and 24 July 2016, at the East of England Arena.

Kurtz rode in the top tier of British Speedway, riding for various teams, including the Leicester Lions in the SGB Premiership 2018.

In 2019, Kurtz rode for Somerset Rebels and Sheffield Tigers in the British leagues. He won another fours championship in 2019, this time as part of the Somerset team that won the SGB Championship Fours, which was held on 23 June 2019, at the East of England Arena.

== Family ==
Kurtz's brother Brady is also a leading speedway rider.
