= Danny Bird (speedway rider) =

English speedway rider (born 1979)

- Born: 16 November 1979 (age 47); Guildford, Surrey
- Nationality: British (English)

Career history

Great Britain
- 1998-2003: Isle Of Wight Islanders
- 1999: Poole Pirates
- 1999, 2000, 2002-2004: Ipswich Witches
- 2004, 2005, 2007: Reading Racers
- 2006: Glasgow Tigers

Sweden
- 2002–2003: Lejonen

Team honours
- 2003: PL Knockout Cup
- 1998, 2001: Young Shield
- 2002, 2004, 2006: Pairs Championship

Daniel Lee Bird (born 16 November 1979) is a former motorcycle speedway rider from England.

== Speedway career ==
Bird began his British racing career riding for Isle of Wight Islanders during the 1998 Premier League speedway season and helped his team win the end of season Young Shield. Over the next three seasons, he gradually improved his average and by the 2001 season was the team's heat leader alongside Ray Morton. He also won a second Young Shield in 2001.

In 2002, Bird reached the first of three consecutive British Speedway Championship finals and won the Premier League Pairs Championship partnering Adam Shields for the Isle of Wight, during the 2002 Premier League speedway season. The following season, he won the Knockout Cup with the Islanders and also doubled up, riding for Ipswich Witches in the top division.

In 2004, Bird signed Reading Racers, moving from the Islanders and won another Premier League Pairs Championship, partnering Phil Morris for Reading, during the 2004 Premier League speedway season. A serious broken leg injury in March 2005 curtailed the majority of the season for Bird and at the beginning of 2006 he signed for Glasgow Tigers.

Bird won the Premier League Pairs Championship for the third time in 2006, partnering Shane Parker for Glasgow Tigers, during the 2006 Premier League speedway season.

Bird rode in the top tier of British Speedway again, riding for the Reading Racers during the 2007 Elite League speedway season.

Bird's career came to a controversial ending after being banned following testing positive for drugs, which forced him to retire.

At retirement, Bird had earned one international cap for the Great Britain national speedway team.
