= Somerset Rebels =

British speedway team

Club information
- Track address: Oaktree Arena; Edithmead; Highbridge; Somerset
- Country: England
- Founded: 2000
- Closed: 2021
- League: SGB Championship (2019)

Club facts
- Colours: Blue, Red & White
- Track size: 300 metres (330 yd)
- Track record time: 55.12 seconds
- Track record date: 17 July 2019
- Track record holder: Rory Schlein

Major team honours
Premiership KO Cup (tier 1)	2018
Premier League (tier 2)	2013, 2016
Premier League KO Cup (tier 2)	2008, 2013, 2015
Premier Shield	2014, 2016
Pairs (tier 2)	2013, 2016
Fours (tier 2)	2005, 2014, 2019
Premier League Cup	2012, 2016
Conference KO Cup (tier 3)	2001
Conference Trophy	2001

The Somerset Rebels were a British speedway team based in Highbridge, Somerset. Founded in 2000, the club competed in the British SGB Championship until 2019. Their home track was located at the Oak Tree Arena.

== History ==
=== Origins & 2000s ===
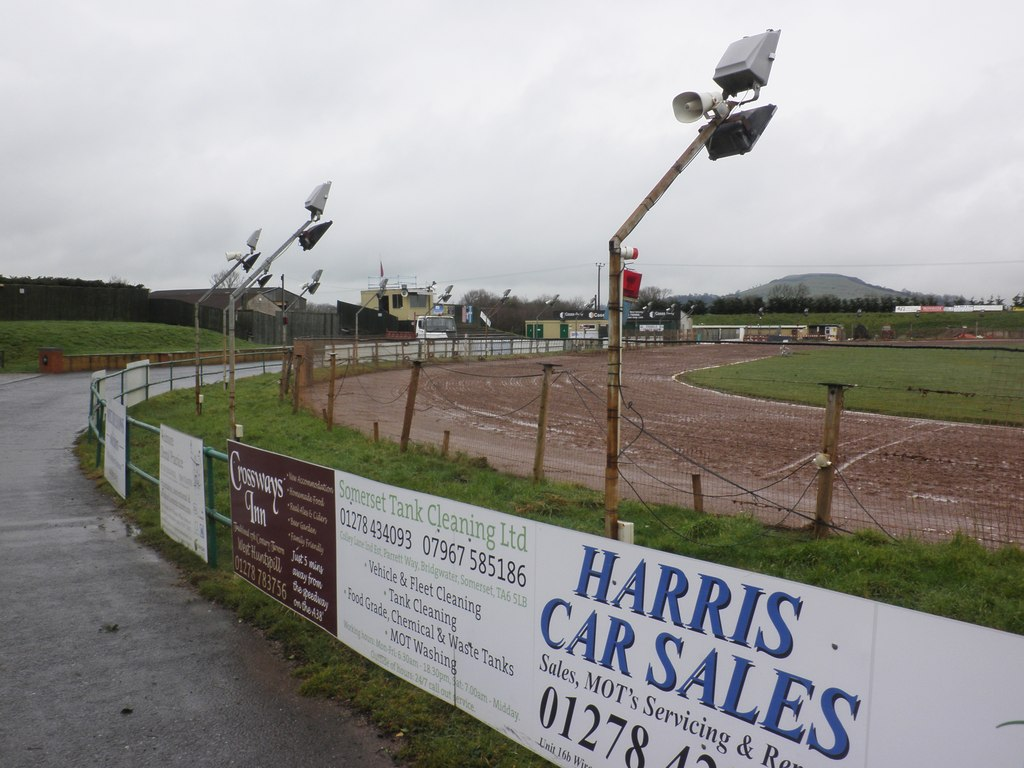
The Oaktree Arena

Promoter Andy Hewlett had been searching for a venue in Somerset to host speedway for some time, when in 1999 he was offered a site by a local farmer. Former Australian rider Glyn Taylor was called in to construct a 300 metres purpose-built speedway stadium ready for the 2000 season. The stadium called the Oak Tree Arena was subsequently opened for the 2000 Speedway Conference League and the Rebels finished 3rd in their inaugural season.

After winning both the Conference Trophy and Conference League KO Cup in 2001 they moved up to the Premier League (division 2) for 2002. After struggling for several seasons, the club signed Magnus Zetterström and together with Glenn Cunningham, Paul Fry and Ritchie Hawkins, the Rebels won the Premier League Four-Team Championship, which was held on 20 August 2005, at Derwent Park.

The 2006 season saw Somerset reach the Knockout Cup Final for the first time, finishing as runners up to King's Lynn Stars over two legs. Magnus Zetterström was the star of the season, winning both the Riders' Championship and setting the highest league average. The Rebels reached the KO Cup final for a second time in a row in 2007, losing out to King's Lynn again.

The 2008 season proved to be successful, despite a major change in the club's line up after their number one rider for the past three seasons, Magnus Zetterstrom was replaced by Jason Doyle but the team finished second in the Premier League table behind the Edinburgh Monarchs, after a season long battle with the Scottish side. Somerset won the Premier League Knockout Cup (tier 2) for the first time in their history. After winning the first leg of the final at Workington 43–46, the Rebels won the return leg at the Oak Tree Arena 52-41 for a 98-84 aggregate victory, with Jason Doyle and Emil Kramer top scoring for Somerset.

Prior to the 2009 season, the team was purchased by Bill Hancock, the owner of the Oaktree Arena.

=== 2010s ===
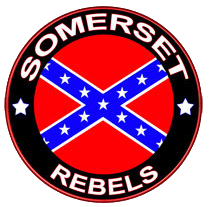
The confederate logo was replaced for the start of the 2016 season

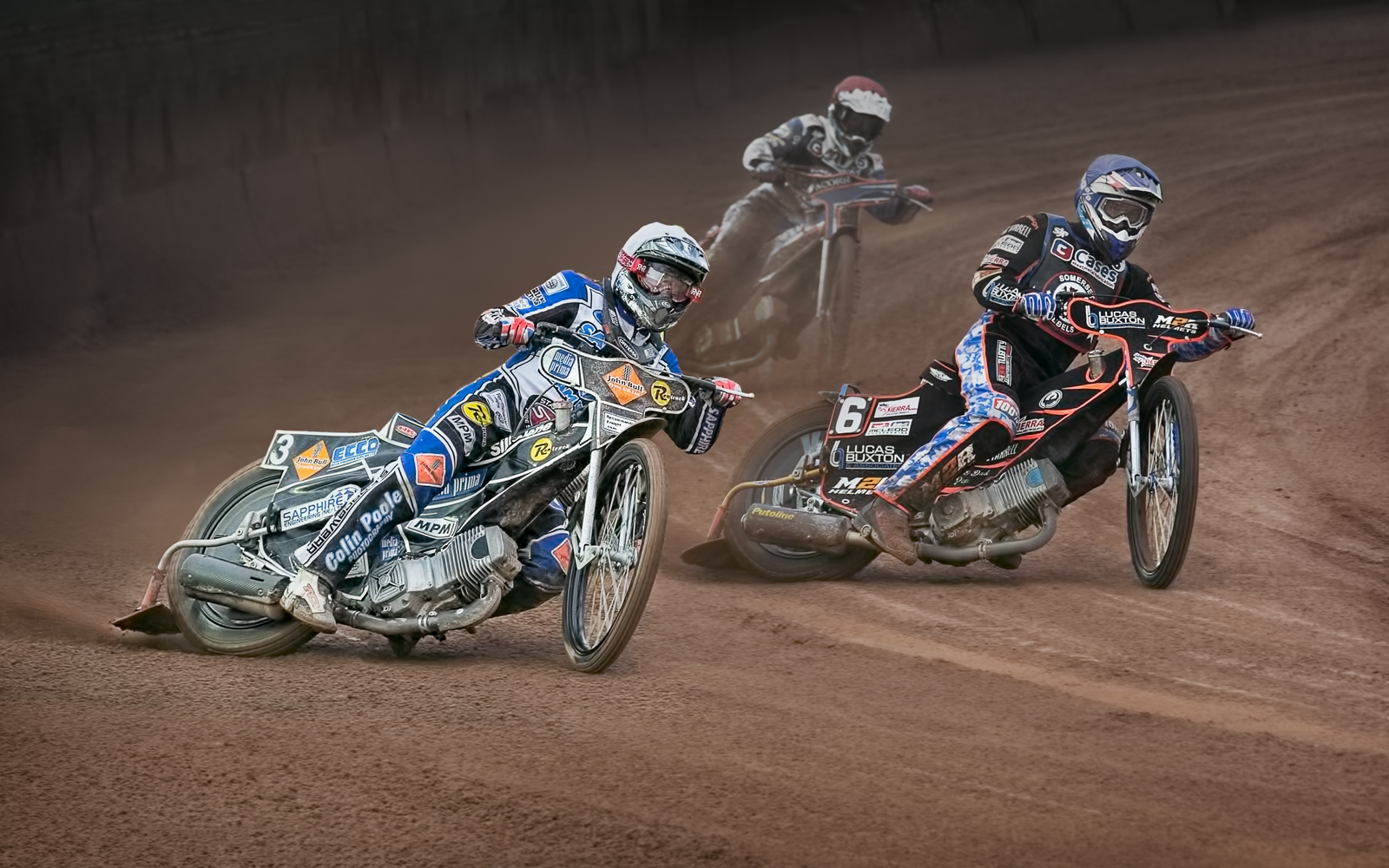
Jake Allen (right) races for the Rebels during their 2016 treble winning season

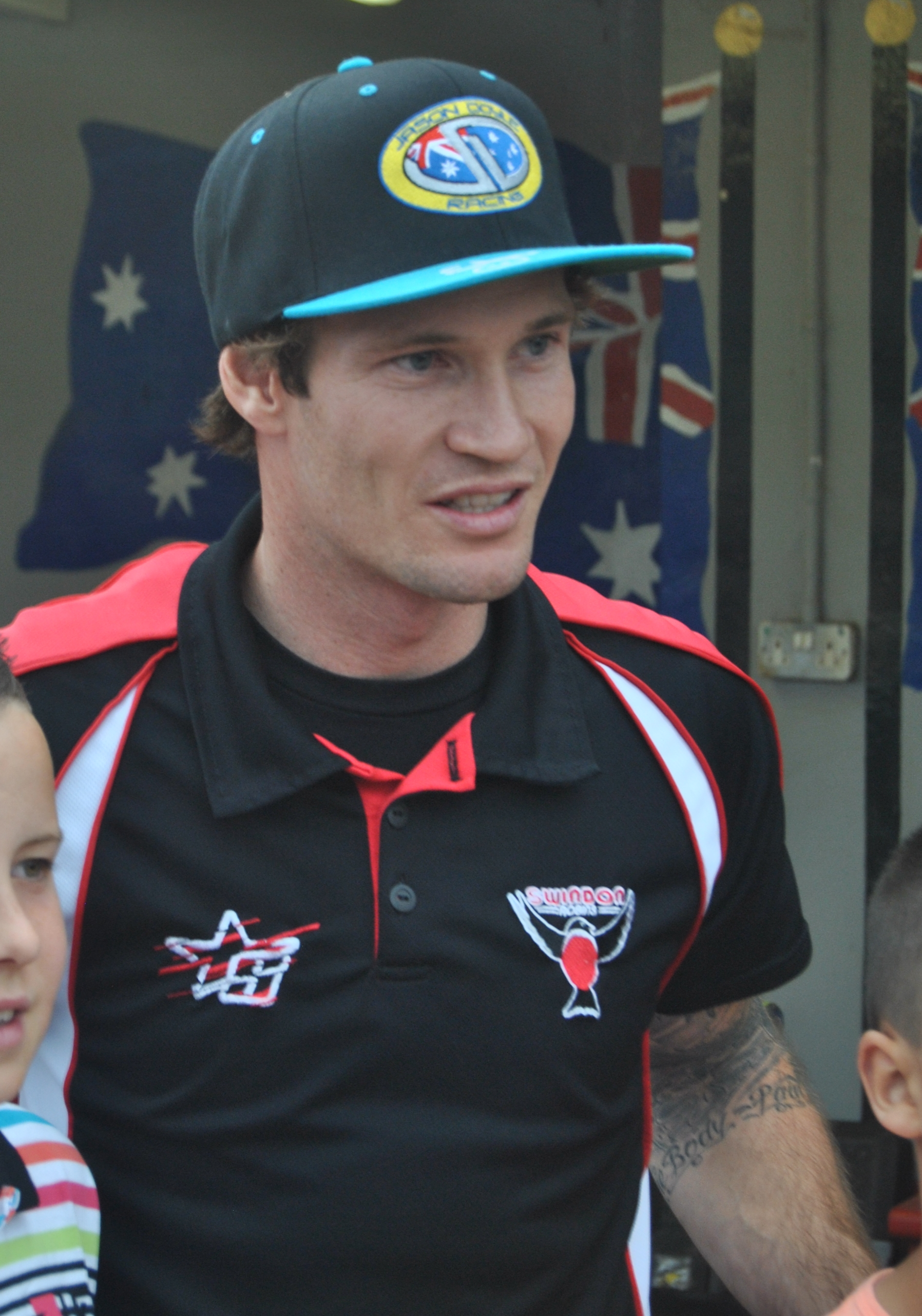
Jason Doyle had three successful spells at the club

In December 2009, Rebels rider Emil Kramer was killed in a road accident in his native Sweden. In his honour, the riders wore blue and yellow race suits for the 2010 season with Kramer's initials embroidered on the collar. Australian Sam Masters was brought in as number 1 for the 2011 season and won the Riders' Championship.

The 2012 season saw the Rebels achieve one of their most successful seasons since their formation. Jason Doyle returned to the club and spearheaded them to winning the Premier League Cup, beating Ipswich Witches over two legs in the final. They also reached the play-off final, losing out on the Premier League Championship to Scunthorpe Scorpions by a single point over two legs.

In 2013, Steve Bishop announced that he would step down as team manager leaving the responsibility to Garry May and the Rebels went on to have the best season in their history by winning the league and cup double and the pairs championship. Jason Doyle and new signing Josh Grajczonek won the Premier League Pairs Championship, held at the Oaktree Arena on 31 May. The Rebels then went on to lift the Premier League KO Cup for the second time in their history, defeating Edinburgh Monarchs in an enthralling semi-final before beating the Rye House Rockets in the final. To complete the treble, the Rebels finished top of the Premier League table and eventually met Edinburgh Monarchs in the play-off final. Edinburgh won the first leg 45–43 but the Rebels won the second leg 49-44, giving them an aggregate win of 3 points.

2014 saw the Rebels pick up more silverware, after the team defeated Newcastle Diamonds to win the Premier League Shield and Oliver Allen, Nick Morris, Pontus Aspgren and Charles Wright won the Premier League Four-Team Championship, held on 3 August 2014, at the East of England Arena.

Somerset won the Premier League Knockout Cup for the third time in eight years in 2015, continuing the success experienced by the club. At the start of the 2016 season the Rebels promoter Debbie Hancock announced a change to the club logo, replacing the original American confederate logo for a logo representing the county of Somerset.

In late 2016, the club announced that it would be moving up into the newly formed SGB Premiership for the 2017 season. In their first top flight season the Rebels endured a tough campaign, finishing sixth overall. The following season in 2018, the club signed 2017 world champion and former Rebels rider Jason Doyle as their number 1, following his release by Swindon Robins. Doyle captained the Rebels to their first top flight trophy, defeating Kings Lynn Stars 98-82 on aggregate in the final of the Premiership Knockout Cup.

In November 2018, after two seasons in the top flight, the Rebels announced that they would be moving down to the SGB Championship, the 2nd tier of British Speedway, for the 2019 season. They reached third in the league that year.

=== 2020s ===
After sitting out the 2020 season due to the COVID-19 pandemic the promotion announced that they would not be running in 2021 despite already having named a squad. On 26 May 2021 the owners formally announced that they had sold the land and there would be no more racing at the site.

In late 2022, it was announced that discussions had taken place between the North Somerset District Council and British Speedway Promoters Ltd for a possible return of speedway in Weston-super-Mare and retaining the Rebels nickname.

== Season summary ==
Extended content

Year and league	Position	Notes
2000 Speedway Conference League	3rd	
2001 Speedway Conference League	2nd	Knockout Cup winners
2002 Premier League speedway season	16th	
2003 Premier League speedway season	17th	
2004 Premier League speedway season	13th	
2005 Premier League speedway season	11th	
2006 Premier League speedway season	5th	
2007 Premier League speedway season	6th	
2008 Premier League speedway season	2nd	Knockout Cup winners
2009 Premier League speedway season	6th	
2010 Premier League speedway season	11th	
2011 Premier League speedway season	6th	
2012 Premier League speedway season	3rd	PO final
2013 Premier League speedway season	1st	Champions & Knockout Cup winners
2014 Premier League speedway season	2nd	
2015 Premier League speedway season	2nd	PO semi finals
2016 Premier League speedway season	1st	Champions
SGB Premiership 2017	6th	
SGB Premiership 2018	2nd	PO semi finals & Knockout Cup winners
SGB Championship 2019	4th	

== Notable riders ==
- (Australia) Josh Grajczonek
- (England) Genn Cunningham
- (Australia) Jason Doyle
- (Sweden) Emil Kramer
- (Australia) Sam Masters
- (Sweden) Magnus Zetterstrom

== Riders previous seasons ==
Extended content

2008 team

- (Sweden) Emil Kramer
- (Australia) Jason Doyle
- (United States) Brent Werner
- (England) Simon Walker
- (Germany) Matthias Kröger
- (England) Jordan Frampton
- (Germany) Stephan Katt

Also Rode:

- (England) Ritchie Hawkins was injured before start of the season
- (Germany) Claus-Henning Loof

2009 team

- (Australia) Steve Johnston
- (Sweden) Emil Kramer
- (Australia) Cory Gathercole
- (England) Simon Walker
- (Australia) Justin Sedgmen
- (Finland) Jari Makinen
- (England) Nick Simmons

Also Rode:

- (Australia) Jay Herne (Released)
- (Wales) Tom Brown (Injured)
- (England) Brendan Johnson (No.8)

2010 team

- (Germany) Christian Hefenbrock
- (England) Ritchie Hawkins
- (Australia) Sam Masters
- (Australia) Shane Parker
- (Australia) Cory Gathercole
- (Australia) James Holder
- (England) Kyle Howarth

Also Rode:

- (Czech Republic) Lubos Tomicek (Released)
- (England) Steve Boxall (With-held services)
- (United States) Brent Werner (Retired)
- (England) Tommy Allen (Injured)
- (Australia) Jay Herne (Injured)
- (England) Mark Baseby (Released)
- (Australia) Jake Anderson (Released)

2011 team

- (Australia) Sam Masters
- (England) James Wright
- (Australia) Cory Gathercole
- (Germany) Christian Hefenbrock
- (Australia) Dakota North
- (Australia) Alex Davies
- (Australia) James Holder

Also Rode:

- (Australia) Travis McGowan (released)
- (Sweden) Anders Mellgren (short-term injury replacement)
- (England) Joe Haines (short-term injury replacement)
- (England) Kyle Hughes (released)

2012 team

- (Australia) Jason Doyle
- (Australia) Alex Davies
- (Denmark) Jesper B. Monberg
- (England) James Wright
- (Denmark) Claus Vissing
- (England) Kyle Newman
- (England) Tom Perry

Also Rode

- (Sweden) Robin Aspegren
- (Australia) Sam Masters

2013 team

- (Australia) Jason Doyle
- (Australia) Alex Davies
- (Australia) Nick Morris
- (England) Kyle Newman
- (Australia) Josh Grajczonek
- (England) Charles Wright
- (England) Lewis Rose

Also Rode

- (England) Tom Perry
- (England) Stefan Nielsen
- (England) Oliver Greenwood

2014 team

- (England) Ollie Allen
- (Australia) Nick Morris
- (Australia) Brady Kurtz
- (Sweden) Pontus Aspgren
- (England) Charles Wright
- (Australia) Todd Kurtz
- (England) Paul Starke

2015 team

- (Australia) Brady Kurtz
- (Australia) Josh Grajczonek
- (England) Richie Worrall
- (England) Charles Wright
- (England) Paul Starke
- (Denmark) Rasmus Jensen
- (England) Oliver Greenwood

Also Rode

- (England) Leigh Lanham
- (England) Benji Compton

2016 team

- (Australia) Josh Grajczonek
- (Australia) Jake Allen
- (England) Charles Wright
- (England) Paul Starke
- (Australia) Rohan Tungate
- (New Zealand) Bradley Wilson-Dean
- (England) Zach Wajtknecht

2017 team

- (Australia) Josh Grajczonek
- (England) Lewis Kerr
- (Denmark) Patrick Hougaard
- (England) Charles Wright
- (England) Richard Lawson
- (Australia) Jake Allen
- (Australia) Cameron Heeps

Also Rode

- (Australia) Rohan Tungate(released)
- (England) Paul Starke(released)
- (Denmark) Jan Graversen(released)

2018 team

- (Australia) Jason Doyle
- (Australia) Jack Holder
- (Australia) Jake Allen
- (Australia) Aaron Summers
- (England) Richard Lawson
- (New Zealand) Bradley Wilson-Dean
- (Italy) Nico Covatti

Also Rode:

- (England) Charles Wright
- (Denmark) Jonas Jeppesen

2019 team

- (England) Chris Harris
- (Australia) Rory Schlein
- (Australia) Nick Morris
- (Italy) Nico Covatti
- (England) Anders Rowe
- (England) Luke Harris
- (Wales) Nathan Stoneman

Also Rode:

- (Germany) Valentin Grobauer
- (England) Henry Atkins
- (Australia) Todd Kurtz

2020 team

- (Australia) Rory Schlein
- (United States) Luke Becker
- (England) Ben Barker
- (England) Josh Bates
- (England) Anders Rowe
- (Australia) Zach Cook
- (Wales) Nathan Stoneman

== Club honours ==
- SGB Championship Fours Championship Winners: 2019
- SGB Premiership Knockout Cup Winners: 2018
- Premier League Championship Winners: 2013, 2016
- Premier League Knockout Cup Winners: 2008, 2013, 2015
- Premier Shield Winners: 2014, 2016
- Premier League Cup Winners: 2012, 2016
- Premier League Pairs Championship Winners: 2013, 2016
- Premier League Fours Championship Winners: 2005, 2014
- Conference Trophy Winners: 2001
- Conference Knockout Cup Winners: 2001
