= Tommy Allen (speedway rider) =

British speedway rider

- Born: 4 September 1984 (age 42); Norwich, England
- Nationality: British (English)

Career history
- 2002: Mildenhall Fen Tigers
- 2002–2003, 2005: Swindon Robins
- 2004–2009: Rye House Rockets
- 2010: Somerset Rebels

Individual honours
- 2005: Vic Harding Memorial Trophy

Team honours
- 2005, 2007: Premier League Champion
- 2005: Premier Trophy Winner

Thomas David Allen (born 4 September 1984 in Norwich, Norfolk) is a former motorcycle speedway rider from England.

== Career ==
Allen won the Premier League Championship in 2005 with Rye House Rockets, and again in 2007. In 2010, which was his final season in speedway, he rode for the Somerset Rebels in the Premier League.

== Family ==
Allen's brother Olly was also a professional rider.
