= Premier League Cup (speedway) =

The League Cup is a motorcycle speedway competition contested by clubs in the Premier League in the United Kingdom. The first year of the competition was 2012, when it replaced the Premier Trophy.

For the 2012 season, the League Cup was contested as two round robin leagues, split into North and South groups, with the top two from each league going on to knockout semi-finals. The North section was won by Workington Comets with Newcastle Diamonds finishing as runners up, while in the South section, Somerset Rebels topped the table ahead of Ipswich Witches. The semi-finals were won by Somerset (who defeated Newcastle) and Ipswich (who beat Workington). The final was contested over two legs, with Somerset winning on aggregate scores.

For 2013, the contest will again begin with mini-leagues but with four sections rather than two.
