= Simon Stead =

British motorcycle speedway rider and team manager

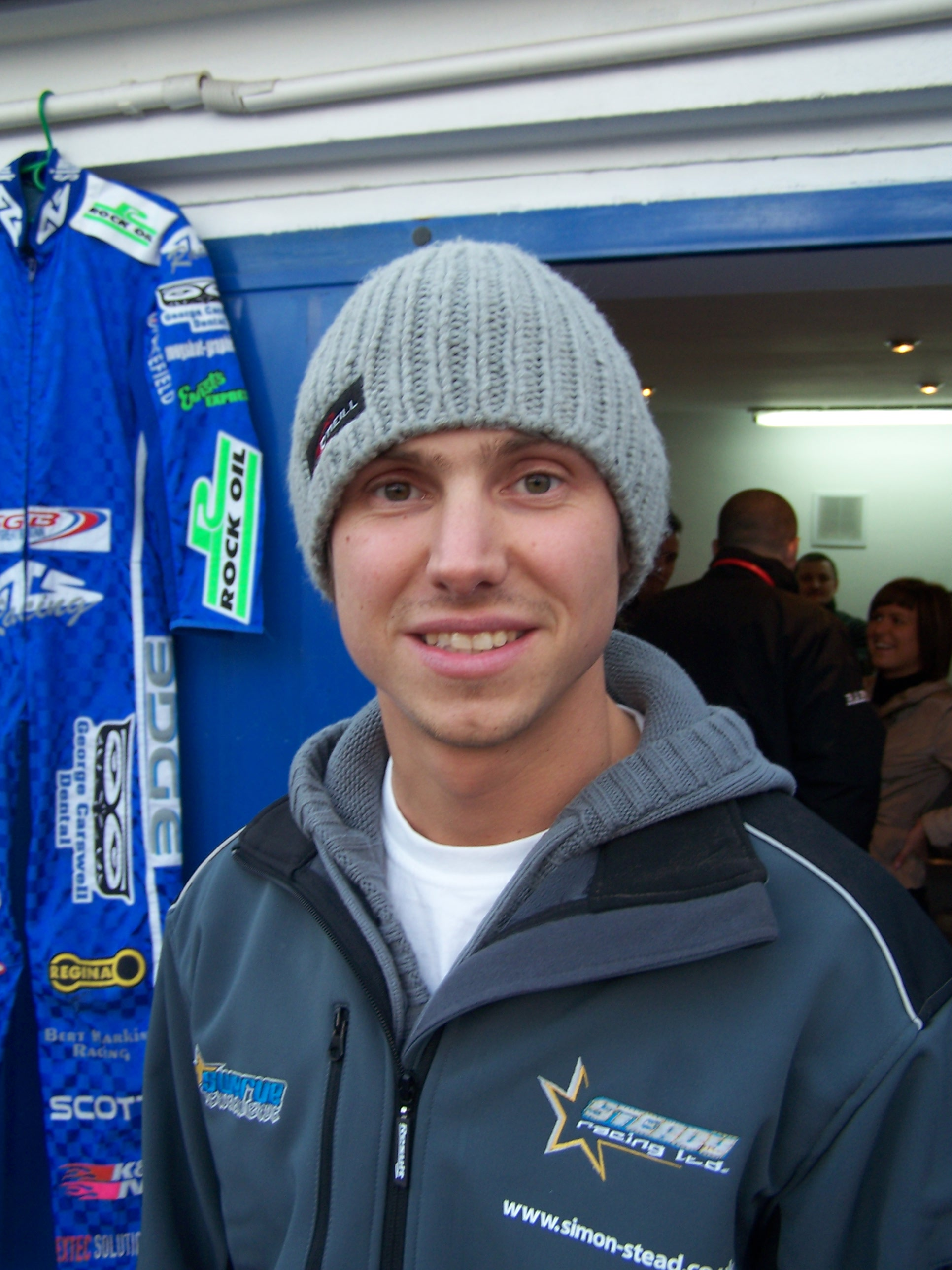
- Born: 25 April 1982 (age 44); Sheffield, England
- Nickname: Steady
- Nationality: British (English)

Career history

Great Britain
- 1998, 2002: Peterborough Panthers
- 1998: Buxton Hitmen
- 1999–2002, 2013-2016: Sheffield Tigers
- 2003–2004: Workington Comets
- 2003–2004: Wolverhampton Wolves
- 2005–2007, 2015: Belle Vue Aces
- 2008–2009: Coventry Bees
- 2009–2012: Swindon Robins
- 2013: King's Lynn Stars
- 2014: Leicester Lions

Poland
- 2000, 2011: Lublin
- 2006: Toruń
- 2007: Gniezno
- 2008: Bydgoszcz
- 2009: Ostrów
- 2010: Piła
- 2013: Kraków

Sweden
- 2001–2002: Örnarna
- 2003: Gasarna
- 2007–2008: Masarna

Individual honours
- 2001, 2002, 2003: British Under 21 Champion
- 2014: Premier League Riders Champion

Team honours
- 2006: Elite League Pairs Champion
- 2003: Premier League Pairs Champion
- 2008: Craven Shield winner
- 2012: Elite League Champion
- 1999, 2000, 2004: Premier League Four-Team Championship

Simon Trevor Stead (born 25 April 1982) is a retired motorcycle speedway rider and team manager. He earned 11 international caps for the Great Britain national speedway team. From 2019, he has been joint manager of the Great Britain team with Oliver Allen.

== Career Summary ==
Born in Sheffield, Stead started his career at local track Sheffield Tigers before riding for Buxton Hitmen, Peterborough Panthers and Workington Comets.

In 1999 and 2000, Stead was part of the Sheffield four that won the Premier League Four-Team Championship.

Stead was British Under-21 Champion three times in the years 2001, 2002 and 2003 and also won the Premier League Pairs Championship with Carl Stonehewer in 2003.

Stead reached the final of the 2004 Premier League Riders Championship won by Andre Compton. Going into the final, Stead was unbeaten and was involved in a crash with Compton, which caused multiple injuries to both riders. Compton was awarded the title. Also in 2004, he was part of the Workington four that won the Premier League Four-Team Championship, which was held on 21 August 2004, at the Derwent Park.

Stead signed for Belle Vue Aces prior to the start of the 2005 season and had three seasons with the club. In those three seasons, he progressed from a reserve to a heat leader. He was chosen to represent Great Britain in the 2005 Speedway World Cup and the 2006 Speedway World Cup. Additionally, he was given the wildcard spot for the 2006 British Speedway Grand Prix, where he scored three points from five rides, and won the 2006 Elite League Pairs Championship along with then teammate Jason Crump.

Stead went on to represent Great Britain again in the 2007 and 2008 Speedway World Cups. For the 2008 season, he joined the Coventry Bees on loan.

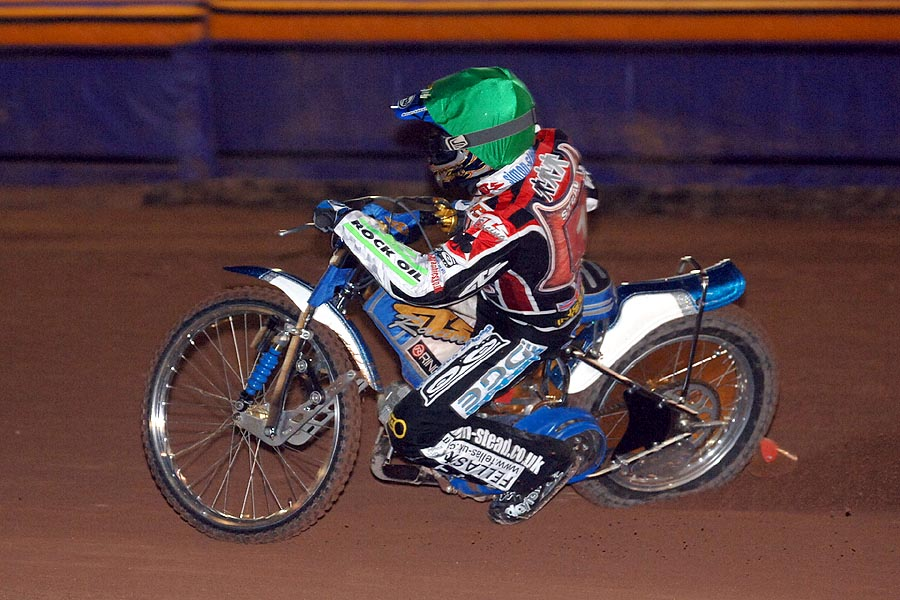
Stead riding for Belle Vue in 2007

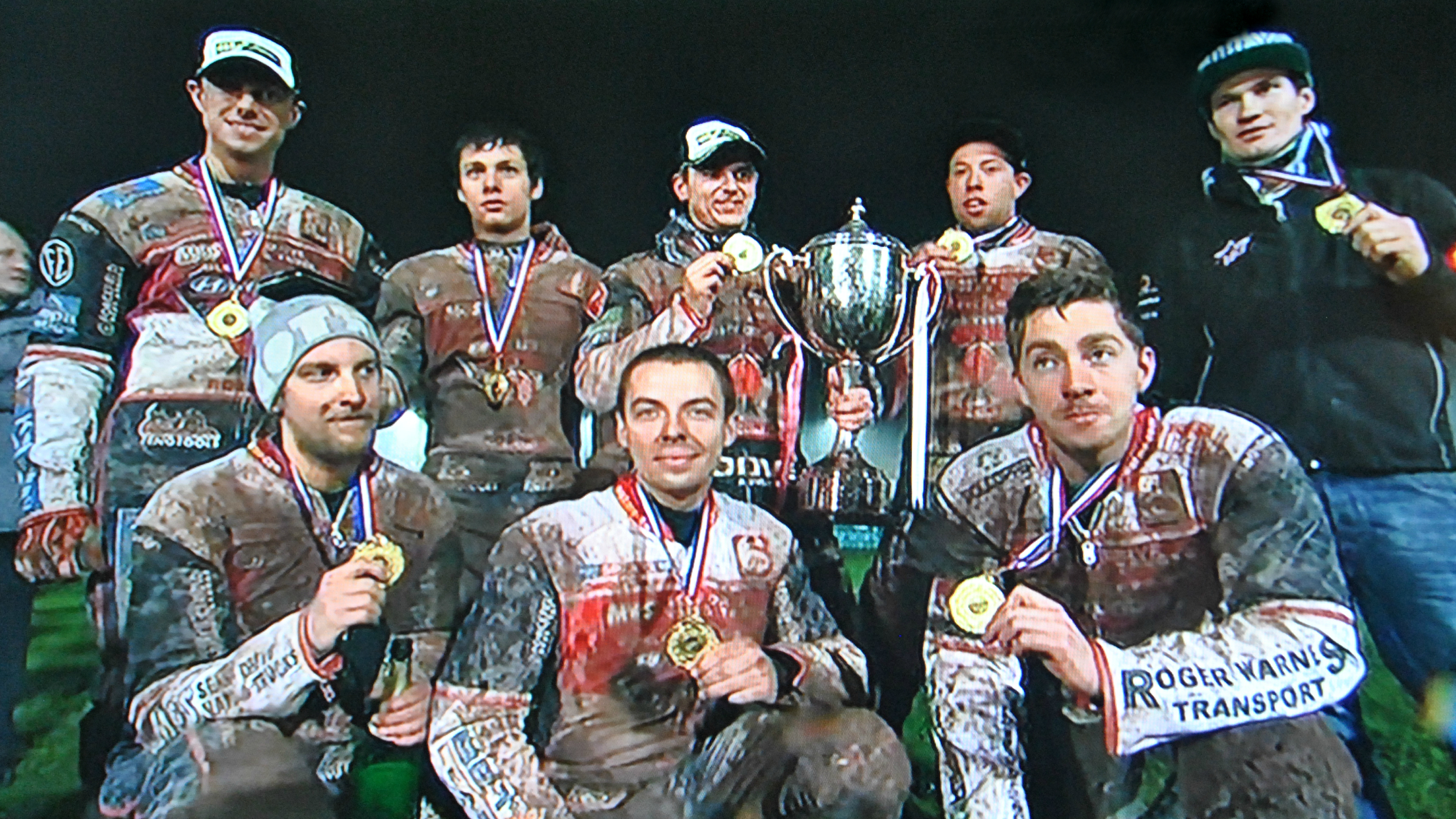
Stead (back, far left) celebrating the league win with Swindon in 2012

In 2009, Stead signed a contract which involved him moving from Coventry to the Swindon Robins and won the 2012 Elite League with Swindon.

Stead re-signed with Sheffield Tigers in 2013 with the option of doubling up with King's Lynn Stars, his season was cut short by a broken leg sustained while practising in June, and signed for Sheffield Tigers again in 2014 doubling up with Leicester Lions.

In 2014, Stead won the Premier League Riders Championship, held on 21 September at his home track of Owlerton. It was reward for the misfortune experienced the year before and also made up for the disaster in the same event ten years earlier. He won the Riders' Championship for the second time in 2016.

In 2017, Stead moved in to team management, and won the SGB Championship with Sheffield Tigers. In 2018 he took on the team manager role for both Tigers and Leicester Lions. In September 2019 he was appointed as joint team manager (with Oliver Allen) of the Great Britain speedway team.

== Speedway Grand Prix results ==
2006 Speedway Grand Prix Final Championship standings (Riding No 16)
Race no.	Grand Prix	Pos.	Pts.	Heats	Draw No
4 /10	(United Kingdom) British SGP	15	3	(0,0,0,2,1)	16

permanent speedway rider
wild card, track reserve or qualified reserve
rider not classified (track reserve who did not start)

== See also ==
- List of Speedway Grand Prix riders
