= Emil Kramer =

Swedish speedway rider

- Born: 14 November 1979; Mariestad, Sweden
- Died: 9 December 2009 (aged 30); Töreboda, Sweden
- Nationality: Swedish

Career history

Sweden
- 1996–2003: Örnarna
- 2001: Smederna
- 2003: VMS Elit
- 2007: Dackarna
- 2008: Lejonen

Great Britain
- 2002–2005: Hull Vikings
- 2002: King's Lynn Stars
- 2003–2005: Oxford Cheetahs
- 2006–2009: Somerset Rebels

Team honours
- 2001: Allsvenskan Winner
- 2007: Swedish Speedway Team Championship
- 2004: UK League & KO Cup double
- 2008: UK Knockout Cup

Emil Karl Leif Kramer (14 November 1979 – 9 December 2009) was a motorcycle speedway rider from Sweden.

== Career ==
Kramer came to prominence in 2000 when he reached the final of the 2000 Speedway Under-21 World Championship, where he secured a seventh-place finish.

Kramer began his British league career in 2002, when he signed for King's Lynn Silver Machine for the 2002 Elite League speedway season and Hull Vikings for the 2002 Premier League speedway season.

In 2003, Kramer switched from King's Lynn to Oxford for the 2003 Elite League speedway season, although he remained with the same Silver Machine promotion.

Kramer spent the following two seasons (2004 and 2005) with both Hull and Oxford He won the league and cup double with Hull during the 2004 Premier League speedway season.

Kramer joined the Somerset Rebels for the 2006 Premier League speedway season. He stayed with Somerset for two more seasons in 2008 and 2009. In 2008, he was part of the team that won the Premier League Knockout Cup and in 2009 he was voted Somerset Rebels Rider of The Year.

Following the 2009 season, Kramer returned to Sweden as usual, but on the night of 9 December 2009, he was killed in a car accident.
