= Oliver Allen (speedway rider) =

British motorcycle speedway rider

- Born: 27 May 1982 (age 44); Norwich, England
- Nationality: British (English)

Career history

Great Britain
- 1997–1998, 2012, 2015: Peterborough Panthers
- 1998: Arena Essex Hammers
- 1999–2005: Swindon Robins
- 2005, 2010–2011: King's Lynn Stars
- 2005: Eastbourne Eagles
- 2006–2009, 2013: Coventry Bees
- 2010: Ipswich Witches
- 2014: Somerset Rebels

Sweden
- 2002–2004: Vargarna
- 2005: Getingarna
- 2008: Masarna

Poland
- 2007: Gniezno
- 2008–2011: Grudziądz
- 2012: Rybnik
- 2013–2014: Kraków

Individual honours
- 2006: Queensland State Champion
- 2013: Premier League Riders Champion

Team honours
- 2007: Elite League Champion
- 1998: Premier League Champion
- 2006, 2007: Elite League KO Cup Winner
- 2000, 2005: Premier League KO Cup Winner
- 2007, 2008: Craven Shield winner
- 2000, 2005: Young Shield Winner
- 2003, 2014: Premier League Fours Winner
- 1997: Conference League Champion

Oliver James Allen (born 27 May 1982 in Norwich, Norfolk) is a former motorcycle speedway rider from England. He earned two international caps for the Great Britain national speedway team. From 2019, he has been joint manager of the Great Britain team with Simon Stead.

== Family ==
Allen's brother Tommy was also a speedway rider.

== Career ==
Allen began his speedway career riding at Peterborough Panthers, initially winning the 1997 Speedway Conference League with the junior side called the Thundercats before being promoted to the main side during the 1998 Premier League speedway season, where he contributed towards a league winning season again.

Allen joined the Swindon Robins in 1999 and stayed with the club for seven years. He was part of the Swindon team that won the Knockout Cup in 2000 and part of the four that won the Premier League Four-Team Championship, held on 27 July 2003, at the Abbey Stadium.

The success continued, winning a second Knockout Cup title with King's Lynn Stars in 2005, before joining Coventry Bees in 2006, where he won the Elite League Knockout Cup and Elite Shield in 2006 and was part of the Bees team that won the league and cup double in 2007. After leaving Coventry in 2009, Allen had spells at Ipswich and King's Lynn.

Allen's finest individual success came in 2013, when he won the Premier League Riders' Championship. The final was held on 22 September at Owlerton Stadium.

Allen joined the Somerset Rebels in 2014 and was part of the Somerset team that won the Premier League Four-Team Championship, which was held on 3 August 2014, at the East of England Arena.

Allen retired after the 2015 season, a decision brought on after he broke his ankle in a crash.

== Management ==
In September 2019, Allen was appointed as joint team manager (with Simon Stead) of the Great Britain speedway team. In 2021, he helped the British team win their first World team competition in 32 years, when they won the 2021 Speedway of Nations.
