= Chris Schramm =

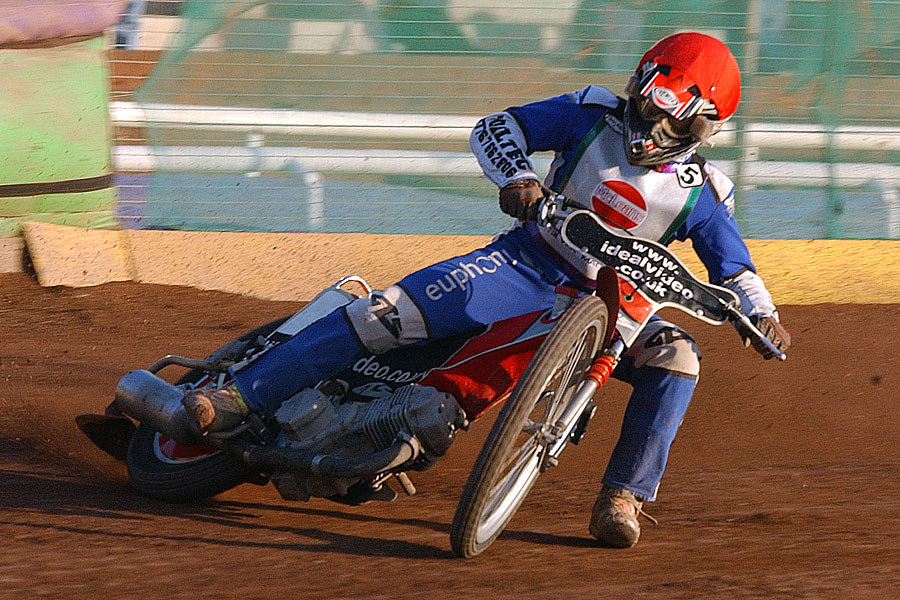
- Schramm riding for Oxford juniors in 2004
- Born: 30 May 1984 (age 42); Maldon, Essex
- Nationality: British (English)

Career history
- 2000, 2005: Berwick
- 2001–2002: Peterborough
- 2001–2002, 2004: Reading
- 2003, 2006–2007: Newport
- 2009–2010, 2012: Eastbourne
- 2004, 2007: Oxford
- 2007–2008, 2011: Ipswich
- 2009: King's Lynn
- 2010: Workington
- 2012: Sheffield
- 2013: Plymouth
- 2013-2014: Newcastle

Christopher Paul Schramm (born 30 May 1984) is a former motorcycle speedway rider from England.

== Speedway career ==
Schramm began his career riding for the Peterborough Pumas in the 2000 Speedway Conference League. The following season, he finished runner-up to David Mason in one of the qualifying rounds of the Riders' Championship, that Mason went on to win.

Schramm progressed to riding for Reading Racers during the 2002 Premier League speedway season. This was also the season in which Schramm rode in the top tier of British Speedway, appearing for Peterboprough Panthers in the Elite League.

Schramm rode for Newport Wasps in 2003 and from 2006 to 2007 and Berwick Bandits in between in 2005. He was also an Oxford Silver Machine Academy rider and a Premier League rider for Ipswich Witches from 2007 to 2008. After a season with King's Lynn Stars, he signed for Workington for the 2010 Premier League speedway season.

Schramm raced for three more teams from 2012 to 2014; Sheffield Tigers, Plymouth Gladiators and the last of which was riding for the Newcastle Diamonds in 2014 before retiring.
