= SGB Championship Fours =

Speedway competition in Britain

- Sport: motorcycle speedway
- Founded: 1995
- Country: United Kingdom

Notes
- replaced the National League; Four-Team Championship in 1995

The SGB Championship Fours formerly the Premier League Four-Team Championship is a contest between teams competing in the second tier of speedway in the United Kingdom. Teams are grouped into fours, with one rider from each team in each race. The winners and second place of each group competed for the Championship in the final.

== History ==
The competition replaced the National League Four-Team Championship (held from 1976 until 1994). It was first staged in 1995 when the Premier League was the highest tier of British speedway because the top two divisions had merged. However, in 1996, it reverted back to a competition for second tier teams in the British Speedway system. From 1997 until 2016 it was known as the Premier League Four-Team Championship.

In 2017, the competition changed its name to the SGB Championship Fours.

== Winners ==
| Year | Winners | 2nd Place | 3rd Place | 4th Place |
|---|---|---|---|---|
Premier League Four-Team Championship
| 1995 | Cradley Heathens | Peterborough Panthers | Bradford Dukes | Arena Essex Hammers |
| 1996 | Oxford Cheetahs | Peterborough Panthers | Hull Vikings | Ipswich Witches |
| 1997 | Long Eaton Invaders | Edinburgh Monarchs | Oxford Cheetahs | Berwick Bandits |
| 1998 | Peterborough Panthers | Edinburgh Monarchs | Hull Vikings | Reading Racers |
| 1999 | Sheffield Tigers | Newport Wasps | Isle of Wight Islanders | Arena Essex Hammers |
| 2000 | Sheffield Tigers | Isle of Wight Islanders | Swindon Robins | Berwick Bandits |
| 2001 | Workington Comets | Newcastle Diamonds | Sheffield Tigers | Isle of Wight Islanders |
| 2002 | Berwick Bandits | Arena Essex Hammers | Newport Wasps | Hull Vikings |
| 2003 | Swindon Robins | Trelawny Tigers | Newport Wasps | Glasgow Tigers |
| 2004 | Workington Comets | Stoke Potters | Glasgow Tigers | Rye House Rockets |
| 2005 | Somerset Rebels | Workington Comets | Exeter Falcons | Rye House Rockets |
| 2006 | Workington Comets | Somerset Rebels | Sheffield Tigers | King's Lynn Stars |
| 2007 | Isle of Wight Islanders | Somerset Rebels | King's Lynn Stars | Rye House Rockets |
| 2008 | Workington Comets | King's Lynn Stars | Somerset Rebels | Scunthorpe Scorpions |
| 2009 | Workington Comets | Somerset Rebels | Edinburgh Monarchs | Berwick Bandits |
| 2010 | Birmingham Brummies | Edinburgh Monarchs | Somerset Rebels | Sheffield Tigers |
| 2011 | Ipswich Witches | Leicester Lions | Workington Comets | Somerset Rebels |
| 2012 | Berwick Bandits | Leicester Lions | Workington Comets | Plymouth Devils |
| 2013 | Edinburgh Monarchs | Ipswich Witches | Somerset Rebels | Berwick Bandits |
| 2014 | Somerset Rebels | Workington Comets | Scunthorpe Scorpions | Edinburgh Monarchs |
| 2015 | Edinburgh Monarchs | Somerset Rebels | Ipswich Witches | Newcastle Diamonds |
| 2016 | Plymouth Devils | Workington Comets | Peterborough Panthers | Berwick Bandits |
SGB Championship Fours
| 2017 | Peterborough Panthers | Redcar Bears | Sheffield Tigers | Ipswich Witches |
| 2018 | Peterborough Panthers | Edinburgh Monarchs | Glasgow Tigers | Lakeside Hammers |
| 2019 | Somerset Rebels | Glasgow Tigers | Sheffield Tigers | Eastbourne Eagles |
2020 cancelled due to COVID-19 pandemic
2021-2022 competition not held

== See also ==
- List of United Kingdom Speedway Fours Champions
- Speedway in the United Kingdom
