= Chris Mills (speedway rider) =

English motorcycle speedway rider

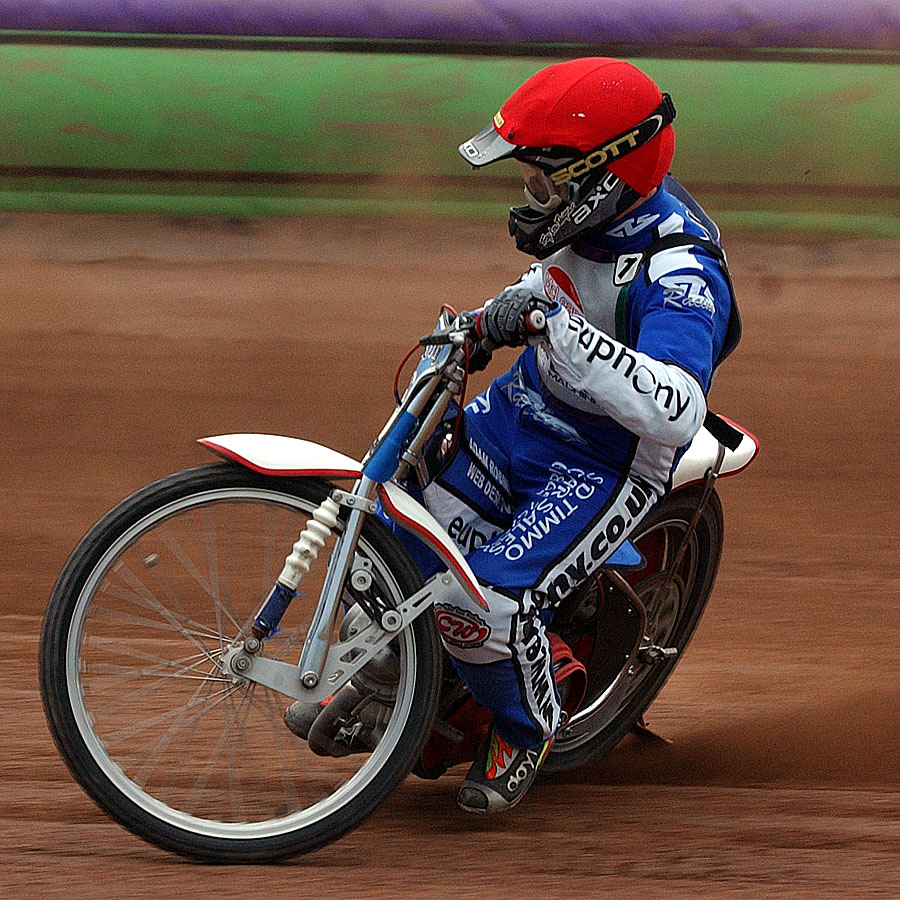
- Mills riding for Oxford juniors in 2004
- Born: 29 March 1983 (age 43); Chelmsford, Essex
- Nationality: English

Career history
- 2002: Rye House Rockets
- 2002, 2003: Isle Of Wight Islanders
- 2004-2006, 2008: Reading Racers
- 2004-2005: Oxford Cheetahs
- 2005, 2013–2014: Workington Comets
- 2005: Somerset Rebels
- 2006, 2007, 2010: Kings Lynn Stars
- 2007-2009: Lakeside Hammers
- 2011: Ipswich Witches
- 2012: Birmingham Brummies
- 2012: Glasgow Tigers
- 2014: Newcastle Diamonds

Christopher William Mills (born 29 March 1983) is a former motorcycle speedway rider from England.

== Speedway career ==
Mills rode in the top two tiers of British Speedway for various clubs during his career, including riding for Ipswich Witches in 2011 and started his racing career with an appearance for Arena Essex Hammers in 2001.

Mills finished his career with Newcastle Diamonds in 2014.
