= Oaktree Arena =

British speedway venue

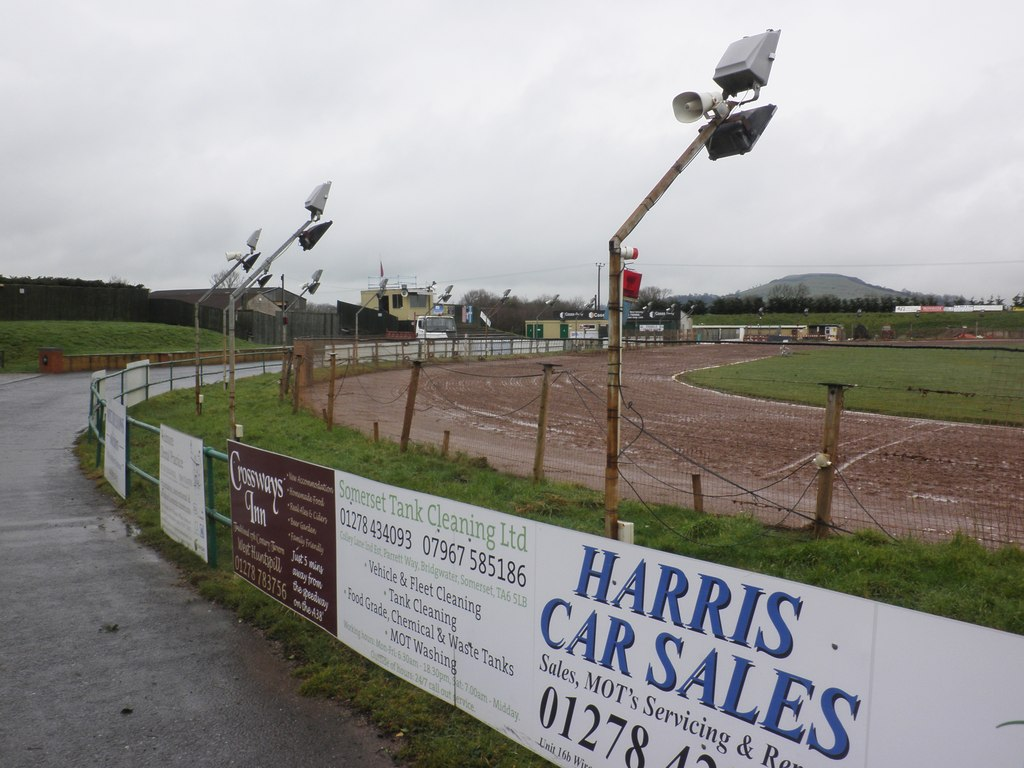
- Interactive map of Oaktree Arena
- Coordinates: 51°13′49″N 2°57′21″W
- Surface: Speedway (shale)

Construction
- Opened: 2000
- Closed: 2021

Tenants
- Somerset Rebels (2000–2019)

The Oaktree Arena was a speedway racing track located near Highbridge, Somerset, England. It is 300 metres (330 yd) in length, with banking around the edge for spectators and is built alongside the M5 motorway. There is also a restaurant used for weddings and events. It is also used for property auctions, car boot sales, a golf driving range and a boxing gym.

== History ==
The speedway track, which was constructed in 1999 by Australian speedway rider Glyn Taylor, opened for speedway in time for the Somerset Rebels team to race in the Conference League.

The Somerset Rebels team were founded by promoter Andy Hewlett and entered the 2000 Speedway Conference League. Hewlett had been searching for a venue in Somerset to host speedway for some time, when he was offered the site by a local farmer who had hosted banger meetings (cars) there a couple of times.

Prior to the 2009 speedway season, the Somerset rebels team was purchased by Bill Hancock the owner, of the Oaktree Arena.

In 2021, following difficulties caused by the COVID-19 pandemic, the venue was closed by the owners, the Hancock family.
