= Newport Wasps =

Former Welsh motorcycle speedway team

Club information
- Track address: Somerton Park / Hayley Stadium; Newport
- Country: Wales
- Founded: 1964
- Closed: 2012

Club facts
- Colours: Black and amber
- Track size: 285 metres (312 yd)
- Track record time: 57.37 seconds
- Track record date: 19 September 2010
- Track record holder: Kim Nilsson

Major team honours
Provincial League KO Cup	1964
Premier League KO Cup	2011
Premier Trophy	1999
Conference League	1999
Spring Gold Cup	1974, 1975

Newport Wasps were a British motorcycle speedway team based at Somerton Park and then the Hayley Stadium in Newport, South Wales, from 1964 to 2012. The Wasps logo incorporates the traditional black and amber colours of the City of Newport.

== History ==
=== 1960s ===
Speedway in Newport arrived at Somerton Park (also the home of football) for the 1964 Provincial Speedway League season (division 2). The greyhound racing owners of Somerton Park had recently put the stadium up for sale and ended the greyhound racing in October 1963. The tight speedway track meant that turf had to be brought on to make the corner flag area for football matches and removed once the match had finished.

The speedway team would be known as the Wasps and the promoters signed the likes of Alby Golden, Peter Vandenberg and Dick Bradley, who helped them to a creditable fourth place finish, in addition to winning the division 2 version of the Knockout Cup, when winning the Provincial League Knockout Cup during their debut season.

The following season in 1965, they joined the inaugural British League season (the top division) and continued to ride in the top division for the remainder of the 1960s, although with little success. Top Swedish riders Gote Nordin and Torbjörn Harrysson led the team in 1966 and 1967/68 respectively.

Promoters Wally Mawdsley and Pete Lansdale took over the Wasps in 1969, following Mike Parker relinquishing his interest.

=== 1970s ===
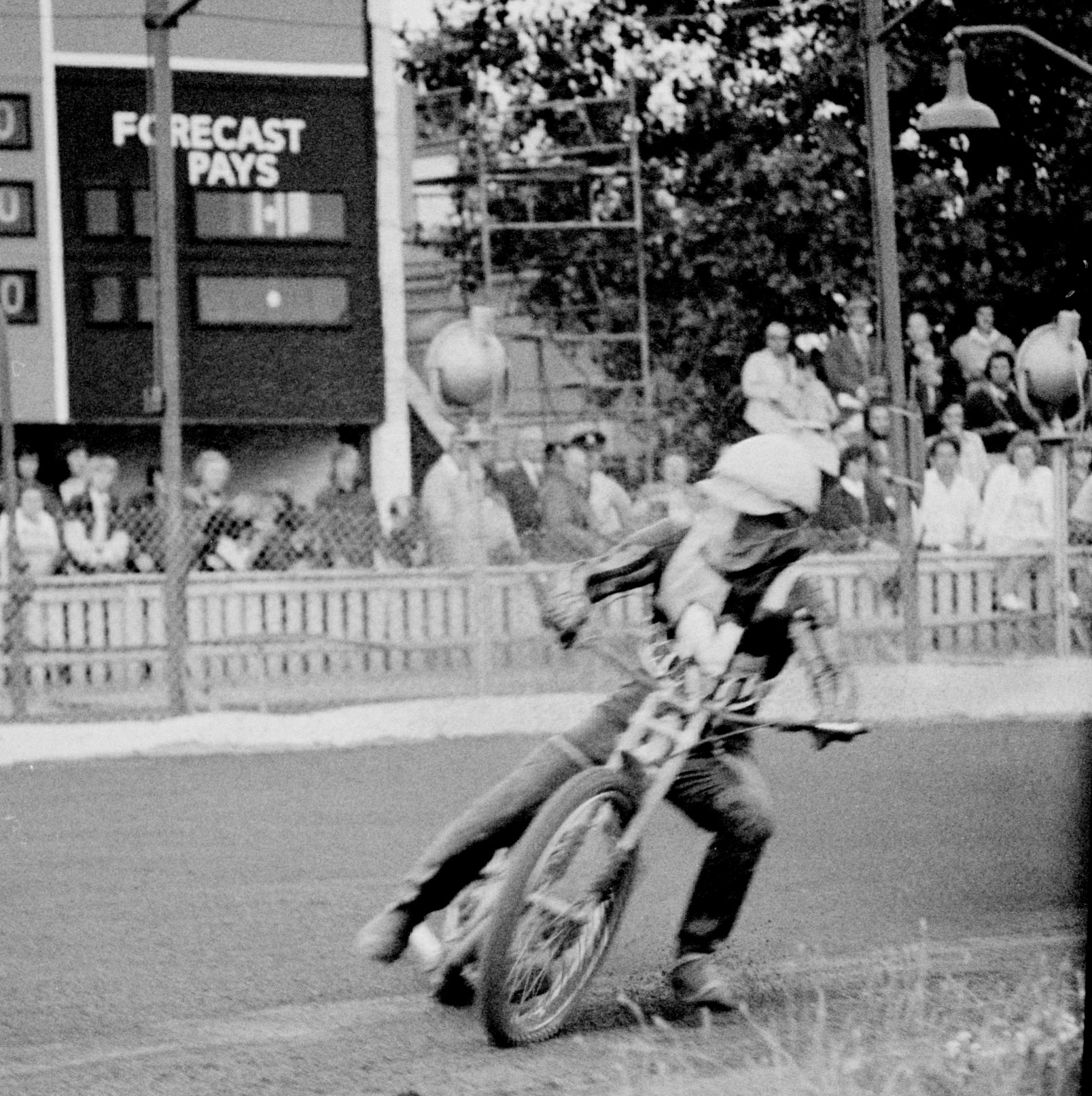
Phil Herne in action for Newport in 1975

The Wasps finished bottom of the league during the 1970 British League season but improved to eighth the following season under their Hungarian star Sándor Lévai. The 'Wasps' nickname was dropped after the poor 1972 season, with the team simply called Newport.

For the 1974 season, the Wasps signed Australian star Phil Crump and with the support of Reidar Eide and Phil Herne, the team finished third during the 1975 British League season. The entire promotion and riders moved to Bristol in 1977 and became the Bristol Bulldogs, leaving Newport with no team but speedway would continue at Somerton Park with a team called the Newport Dragons being formed and they would compete in the division below the British League known as the National League.

The Dragons only lasted the one season because before the start of the 1978 campaign, the speedway team withdrew from the league following a dispute over rent. Speedway was not seen at Somerton Park again.

=== 1997–2011 ===
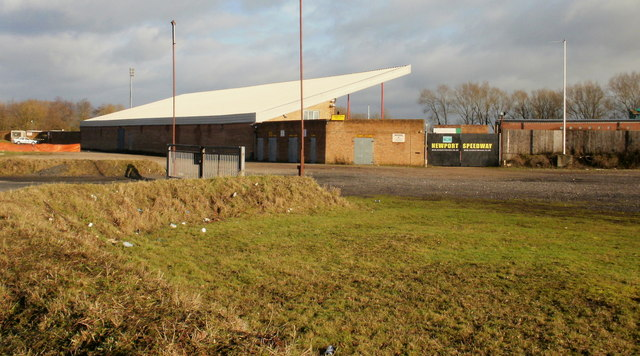
Hayley Stadium

The modern incarnation of the team was founded in 1997, when the Wasps entered the Premier League and the junior side called the Western Warriors (a combined team from Newport and Exeter competed in the Conference League. The teams were based at the purpose built Hayley Stadium. The following season (1998) a junior side known as the Newport Mavericks joined the Conference League and then won the 1999 Speedway Conference League.

The Wasps continued to compete in the Premier League until the early part of the 2008 season when they withdrew because their promoter Tim Stone died only to be saved by the Mallett family and rebranded for the 2009 season (including a junior side called the Newport Hornets) with Steve Mallett at the helm and his son Nick Mallett joining him as the youngest promoter in British speedway history. The 2009 season saw the Hornets win the national league pairs with the pairing of veteran Tony Atkin and New Zealander Grant Tregoning. The following season Newport beat Somerset for the Severn Bridge trophy and the Hornets finished third in the National league, losing out on the title by points difference.

The Wasps last season ended with a trophy, they won the 2011 Premier League Knock-Out Cup defeating Glasgow in the final.

After a disagreement with the BSPA and ring wood raceway deciding not to follow up plans to run stock cars and destroying the previous fence the club was put up for sale but after talks with the only interested party, Phil Morris, an agreement could not be reached and on 17 February 2012 promoter Steve Mallett confirmed the club would fold with immediate effect. The club shortly after was vandalised and the victim of an arson attack which devastated the stadium leading to it being demolished and redeveloped by owners MCL and speedway was lost to the city once again.

== Season summary ==
Extended content

Year and league	Position	Notes
1964 Provincial Speedway League	4th	Wasps, Knockout Cup winners
1965 British League season	6th	Wasps
1966 British League season	17th	Wasps
1967 British League season	12th	Wasps
1968 British League season	13th	Wasps
1969 British League season	17th	Wasps
1970 British League season	19th	Wasps
1971 British League season	8th	Wasps
1972 British League season	18th	Wasps
1973 British League season	10th	
1974 British League season	6th	
1975 British League season	3rd	
1976 British League season	8th	
1977 National League season	12th	Dragons
1997 Premier League speedway season	14th	Wasps
1998 Premier League speedway season	8th	Wasps
1999 Premier League speedway season	2nd	Wasps
2000 Premier League speedway season	10th	Wasps
2001 Premier League speedway season	15th	Wasps
2002 Premier League speedway season	12th	Wasps
2003 Premier League speedway season	10th	Wasps
2004 Premier League speedway season	14th	Wasps
2005 Premier League speedway season	15th	Wasps
2006 Premier League speedway season	14th	Wasps
2007 Premier League speedway season	14th	Wasps
2008 Premier League speedway season	N/A	Wasps, withdrew
2009 Premier League speedway season	14th	Wasps
2010 Premier League speedway season	10th	Wasps
2011 Premier League speedway season	5th	Wasps, 2011 Premier League Knock-Out Cup winners

== Season summary (juniors) ==
Extended content

Year and league	Position	Notes
1997 Speedway Conference League	8th	as the Western Warriors (with Exeter)
1998 Speedway Conference League	2nd	Mavericks
1999 Speedway Conference League	1st	Mavericks, Champions
2000 Speedway Conference League	5th	Mavericks
2001 Speedway Conference League	7th	Mavericks
2002 Speedway Conference League	10th	Mavericks
2003 Speedway Conference League	13th	Mavericks
2004 Speedway Conference League	13th	Mavericks
2005 Speedway Conference League	10th	Mavericks
2006 Speedway Conference League	8th	Mavericks
2007 Speedway Conference League	8th	Mavericks
2009 National League speedway season	7th	Hornets
2010 National League speedway season	3rd	Hornets
2011 National League speedway season	10th	Hornets

== Notable riders ==
- (Australia) Jack Biggs
- (England) Dick Bradley
- (Australia) Phil Crump
- (Norway) Reidar Eide
- (England) Alby Golden
- (England) Jimmy Gooch
- (Sweden) Torbjörn Harrysson
- (Australia) Phil Herne
- (Hungary) Sándor Lévai
- (Sweden) Gote Nordin
- (Netherlands) / (Australia) Peter Vandenberg
