= 2008 Premier League speedway season =

British motorcycle speedway season

- League: Premier League
- Champions: Edinburgh Monarchs
- Knockout Cup: Somerset Rebels
- Premier Trophy: Edinburgh Monarchs
- Young Shield: Workington Comets
- Individual: Tai Woffinden
- Pairs: Workington Comets
- Fours: Workington Comets
- Highest average: Daniel Nermark
- Division/s above: 2008 Elite League
- Division/s below: 2008 Conference

The 2008 Premier League speedway season was the second division of motorcycle speedway racing in the United Kingdom and the 14th season since its creation in 1995. The league was governed by the Speedway Control Bureau (SCB), in conjunction with the British Speedway Promoters' Association (BSPA).

== Summary ==
The League consisted of 16 teams for the 2008 season with the addition of the 2007 Conference League champions the Scunthorpe Scorpions. New rules introduced for 2008 include three points for an away win compared to two points in 2007, and the removal of bonus points, in which a team was awarded an additional point for an aggregate win over a home and away match against another team. The team finishing at the top of the league table at the end of the season after accumulating the most points were declared the Premier League champions. The four highest placed teams were entered into promotion play-offs, whereby the Premier League play-off winner faced the Elite League relegation play-off final losers over two legs. Teams finishing in fifth to twelfth at the time of the fixture cut-off date compete in the Young Shield. Newport Wasps withdrew from the league following the death of their promoter Tim Stone.

The Edinburgh Monarchs were crowned the Premier League champions after ending the season as the highest placed team. The Somerset Rebels finished second, King's Lynn Stars third and the Rye House Rockets fourth. All four teams took part in the promotion play-off with Edinburgh and King's Lynn reaching the final. Edinburgh won 93–90 on aggregate and faced Elite League team Wolverhampton Wolves, but lost the two-legged promotion/relegation final 106–76.

== League ==
=== Final league table ===
Key:
Promotion Play-Offs

Pos	Club	M	Home			Away			F	A	Pts
Pos	Club	M	W	D	L	W	D	L	F	A	Pts
1	Edinburgh Monarchs	30	15	0	0	7	2	6	1562	1161	53
2	Somerset Rebels	30	15	0	0	6	0	9	1517	1223	48
3	Kings Lynn Stars	30	14	1	0	4	4	7	1624	1111	45
4	Rye House Rockets	30	15	0	0	4	0	11	1500	1232	42
5	Workington Comets	30	12	2	1	5	0	10	1435.5	1300.5	41
6	Berwick Bandits	30	13	2	0	3	0	12	1428	1316	37
7	Redcar Bears	30	12	0	3	4	1	10	1369	1374	37
8	Sheffield Tigers	30	12	1	2	3	1	11	1381	1345	35
9	Reading Racers	30	12	1	2	3	0	12	1350	1405	34
10	Scunthorpe Scorpions	30	12	0	3	3	0	12	1309	1434	33
11	Isle of Wight Islanders	30	14	0	1	1	0	14	1359	1390	31
12	Birmingham Brummies	30	9	0	6	4	0	11	1317.5	1401.5	30
13	Stoke Potters	30	9	1	5	2	0	13	1307	1441	25
14	Newcastle Diamonds	30	8	0	7	2	0	13	1220	1501	22
15	Glasgow Tigers	30	8	0	7	1	0	14	1297	1469	19
16	Mildenhall Fen Tigers	30	0	0	15	0	0	15	932	1804	0

=== Fixtures and results ===
Home \ Away	BER	BIR	ED	GLA	IOW	KL	MT	NEW	RR	RED	RYE	SCU	SHE	SOM	STO	WOR
Berwick Bandits		58–34	45–45	54–39	46–44	45–45	72–18	62–31	61–32	46–44	60–33	48–42	52–41	58–35	52–41	48–41
Birmingham Brummies	42–48		40–51	52–40	52–38	38–54	61–32	46–44	40–49	46–45	42–48	53–37	46–44	48–44	46–47	47.5–42.5
Edinburgh Monarchs	59–33	52–29		54–39	67–23	54–39	69–21	64–29	49–43	55–37	47–46	68–22	56–33	66–24	54–39	59–30
Glasgow Tigers	50–43	40–53	45–47		51–42	46–47	55–37	44–46	60–32	42–48	52–41	46–44	44–46	51–39	56–36	41–49
Isle of Wight Islanders	53–40	51–41	60–32	51–42		49–41	65–28	68–22	58–34	53–40	51–42	60–32	54–39	41–49	56–37	49–44
King's Lynn Stars	61–29	66–24	45–45	61–32	68–23		72–18	65–27	59–31	66–27	62–31	63–28	59–35	68–25	67–25	61–32
Mildenhall Fen Tigers	29–61	36–55	30–60	35–56	41–52	23–67		39–53	42–51	35–58	27–65	40–53	27–65	37–55	34–56	31–53
Newcastle Diamonds	47–42	44–46	40–49	53–42	48–42	50–42	68–22		45–44	42–48	33–41	46–47	48–41	47–48	48–42	42–48
Reading Racers	47–46	48–42	41–48	51–43	46–44	45–45	60–33	60–32		57–35	47–46	49–44	60–33	39–53	54–41	54–39
Redcar Bears	51–41	46–44	49–41	55–38	52–41	43–47	53–40	59–33	42–48		50–43	50–40	54–39	39–54	51–40	47–43
Rye House Rockets	57–33	53–40	48–42	65–27	66–24	49–41	66–23	59–34	54–39	65–26		54–38	61–32	65–25	55–37	52–40
Scunthorpe Scorpions	52–41	49–44	39–53	54–39	53–40	46–43	48–42	56–36	53–40	52–41	40–53		43–47	51–39	46–44	47–43
Sheffield Tigers	48–42	40–44	55–36	63–29	59–33	48–40	65–27	55–38	51–42	45–45	54–36	52–38		50–40	52–38	40–50
Somerset Rebels	58–34	48–45	48–44	63–29	67–22	53–40	72–18	65–25	62–31	48–42	66–27	63–29	60–30		68–22	57–36
Stoke Potters	55–37	56–36	36–57	49–43	53–40	45–45	54–39	54–38	51–40	41–48	54–35	43–47	58–34	43–45		36–59
Workington Comets	42–51	51–41	53–39	59–36	58–32	45–45	64–28	61–31	54–36	49–44	46–44	54–39	45–45	46–44	59–34	

Legend: Blue = home team win; Yellow = draw; Red = away team win.

== Premier League Knockout Cup ==
The 2008 Premier League Knockout Cup was the 41st edition of the Knockout Cup for tier two teams. Somerset Rebels were the winners of the competition.

First round

Date	Team one	Score	Team two
11/04	Scunthorpe	44-48	Sheffield
10/04	Sheffield	55-36	Scunthorpe

Second round

Date	Team one	Score	Team two
23/04	Birmingham	43-47	Glasgow
20/04	Glasgow	40-52	Birmingham
24/04	Redcar	53-40	Mildenhall
27/04	Mildenhall	40-50	Redcar
13/05	Isle of Wight	54-38	Sheffield
24/04	Sheffield	52-38	Isle of Wight
25/04	Edinburgh	54-38	Berwick
26/04	Berwick	42-51	Edinburgh
25/04	Somerset	64-28	Newcastle
27/04	Newcastle	39-39	Somerset
26/04	Rye House	60-30	Newport
07/05	Kings Lynn	55-38	Reading
28/04	Reading	59-34	King's Lynn
27/04	Stoke	42-50	Workington
26/05	Workington	54-36	Stoke

ns match not staged Rye House into next round Quarter-finals

Date	Team one	Score	Team two
25/06	Birmingham	42-51	Rye House
31/05	Rye House	62-30	Birmingham
17/06	Isle of Wight	51-43	Workington
07/06	Workington	53-38	Isle of Wight
30/05	Edinburgh	55-38	Redcar
29/05	Redcar	39-53	Edinburgh
30/05	Somerset	53-39	Reading
29/06	Reading	51-44	Somerset

Semi-finals

Date	Team one	Score	Team two
27/09	Workington	53-39	Edinburgh
26/09	Edinburgh	49-41	Workington
25/08	Rye House	50-43	Somerset
22/08	Somerset	53-38	Rye House

Final

First leg

11 October 2008

Workington Comets Jason Lyons (guest) 17 Joe Haines 9 Carl Stonehewer 8 John Branney 5 Charles Wright 3 Tony Reima 1 Kauko Nieminen R/R	43 – 46	Somerset Rebels Emil Kramer 10 Jason Doyle 10 Stephan Katt 9 Jordan Frampton 9 Matthias Kröger 6 Brent Werner 2 Simon Walker R/R

Derwent Park

Second leg

17 October 2008

Somerset Rebels Jason Doyle 14 Emil Kramer 11 Brent Werner 10 Matthias Kröger 9 Jordan Frampton 7 Stephan Katt 1 Simon Walker R/R	52 – 41	Workington Comets Jason Lyons (guest) 17 Joe Haines 8 Tony Reima 8 Charles Wright 4 Carl Stonehewer 3 John Branney 1 Kauko Nieminen R/R

Oaktree Arena

Somerset were declared Knockout Cup Champions, winning on aggregate 98–84.

== Premier Trophy ==
Group 1

Pos	Team	P	W	D	L	Pts
1	Edinburgh	6	5	0	1	10
2	Workington	6	4	0	2	8
3	Glasgow	6	2	0	4	2
4	Berwick	6	1	0	5	2

Group 2

Pos	Team	P	W	D	L	Pts
1	Sheffield	8	6	0	2	12
2	Redcar	8	3	2	3	8
3	Scunthorpe	8	3	1	4	7
4	Newcastle	8	3	1	4	7
5	Stoke	8	3	0	5	5

Group 3

Pos	Team	P	W	D	L	Pts
1	Birmingham	6	4	0	2	8
2	Rye House	6	4	0	2	6
3	King's Lynn	6	3	0	3	6
4	Mildenhall	6	1	0	5	2

Group 4

Pos	Team	P	W	D	L	Pts
1	Reading	6	4	0	2	8
2	Somerset	6	4	0	2	8
3	Isle of Wight	6	3	0	3	6
4	Newport	6	1	0	5	2

Home \ Away	BER	ED	GLA	WOR
Berwick		42–48	52–44	44–46
Edinburgh	56–34		57–36	56–37
Glasgow	47–43	34–58		47–43
Workington	53–40	48–45	60–32	

Legend: Blue = home team win; Yellow = draw; Red = away team win.

Home \ Away	NEW	RED	SCU	SHE	STO
Newcastle		52–38	43–47	63–27	51–42
Redcar	45–45		55–35	47–43	52–38
Scunthorpe	55–38	45–45		41–48	47–43
Sheffield	59–33	53–39	57–36		51–41
Stoke	54–39	49–41	51–39	45–48	

Legend: Blue = home team win; Yellow = draw; Red = away team win.

Home \ Away	BIR	KL	MIL	RYE
Birmingham		43–47	60–33	50–36
King's Lynn	39–55		66–24	61–31
Mildenhall	32–42	46–44		35–56
Rye House	54–36	55–35	59–33	

Legend: Blue = home team win; Yellow = draw; Red = away team win.

Home \ Away	IOW	NWP	REA	SOM
Isle of Wight		46–43	50–42	58–34
Newport	47–42		34–56	43–50
Reading	52–40	59–33		44–49
Somerset	54–39	67–26	42–47	

Legend: Blue = home team win; Yellow = draw; Red = away team win.

Semi-final

Team one	Team two	Score
Birmingham	Sheffield	57–37, 37–53
Edinburgh	Reading	56–34, 44–46

Final

Team one	Team two	Score
Edinburgh	Birmingham	65–24, 52–41

== Young Shield ==
- End of season competition for the league teams positioned 5 to 12.

First Round

Team one	Team two	Score
Birmingham	Berwick	50–42, 40–50
Redcar	Reading	52–40, 60–33
Isle of Wight	Sheffield	57–36, 41–52
Scunthorpe	Workington	51–39, 35–58

Semi-final

Team one	Team two	Score
Isle of Wight	Berwick	53–42, 37–58
Redcar	Workington	50–43, 42–51

Final

Team one	Team two	Score
Workington	Berwick	58–34, 38–55

== Riders' Championship ==
Tai Woffinden won the Riders' Championship. The final was held on 21 September at Owlerton Stadium.

Pos.	Rider	Pts	Total	SF	Final
1	(England) Tai Woffinden	2 1 3 3 3	12	-	3
2	(Australia) Jason Doyle	1 3 2 2 3	11	2	2
3	(Czech Republic) Adrian Rymel	2 2 3 3 2	12	-	1
4	(Finland) Kauko Nieminen	3 3 3 2 fex	11	3	0
5	(England) Ben Barker	3 3 2 0 3	11	1	
6	(England) Jason Bunyan	3 3 2 2 2	12	0	
7	(Australia) Shane Parker	1 2 3 3 1	10		
8	(Denmark) Ulrich Østergaard	2 0 2 1 2	7		
9	(England) Jason King	1 1 1 2 1	6		
10	(Australia) Kevin Doolan	0 2 1 3 0	6		
11	(Sweden) Magnus Karlsson	2 1 0 1 1	5		
12	(England) Andre Compton	3 1 fex 1 ef	5		
13	(Australia) Jason Lyons	tex 2 0 1 2	5		
14	(England) Gary Havelock	1 ef 1 0 1	3		
15	(Scotland) William Lawson	0 0 0 ef 3	3		
16	(England) Scott Richardson (res)	1 1 0	2		
17	(England) Ben Taylor (res)	0 0	0		
18	(Germany) Henning Loof	ef ns ns ns ns	0		

- f=fell, r-retired, ex=excluded, ef=engine failure t=touched tapes

== Pairs ==
The Premier League Pairs Championship was held at Oaktree Arena on 27 June. The event was won by Workington Comets.

Group A
Pos	Team	Pts	Riders
1	Sheffield	25	Compton 13, Ashworth 10
2	Reading	21	Ostergaard 16, Lemon 5
3	Rye House	20	Neath 11, Allen 9
4	Edinburgh	15	Wethers 10, Lawson 5
5	Birmingham	9	Watson 9, Birkinshaw 0

Group B
Pos	Team	Pts	Riders
1	Somerset	26	Kramer 13, Doyle 13
2	Workington	23	Nermark 12, Nieminen 11
3	Redcar	15	Proctor 12, Havelock 3
4	Isle of Wight	14	Bunyan 12, Phillips 2
5	Newcastle	10	Henry 8, Franc 2

Semi finals

- Workington bt Sheffield 7–2
- Somerset bt Reading 5–4

Final

- Workington bt Somerset 6–3

== Fours ==
Workington Comets won the Premier League Four-Team Championship for the fourth time, it was held on 26 July 2006, at Derwent Park.

Group A
Pos	Team	Pts	Riders
1	Workington	14	Nieminen 5, Wright C 3, Stonehewer 3, Haines 3
2	Somerset	13	Doyle 6, Frampton 5, Werner 2, Katt 0
3	Sheffield	11	Ashworth 4, Compton 3, Wilson 2, Parsons 2
4	Edinburgh	10	Fisher 4, Wethers 3, Jonasson 2, Tully 1

Group B
Pos	Team	Pts	Riders
1	King's Lynn	16	Topinka 6, Dolan 5, Tacey 4, Lambert 1
2	Scunthorpe	16	Bergstrom 5, Wilkinson 4, Hall 4, Karlsson 3
3	Newcastle	10	Stancl 4, King 3, Juul 2, Stoddart 1
4	Reading	6	Lemon 3, Suchanek 2, Mills 1, Madsen 0

Final
Pos	Team	Pts	Riders
1	Workington	20+3	Nieminen 6+3, Stonehewer 6, Wright C 5, Haines 3
2	King's Lynn	20+2	Topinka 9+2, Dolan 7, Tacey 2, Lambert 2
3	Somerset	19	Doyle 7, Katt 5, Frampton 4, Werner 3
4	Scunthorpe	13	Wilkinson 5, Hall 5, Bergstrom 3, Karlsson 0

== Final leading averages ==
Rider	Team	Average
(Sweden) Daniel Nermark	Workington	10.53
(Australia) Kevin Doolan	Kings Lynn	10.47
(Denmark) Ulrich Østergaard	Reading	10.29
(Australia) Jason Doyle	Somerset	10.28
(England) Tai Woffinden	Rye House	10.15
(Czech Republic) Adrian Rymel	Berwick	10.07
(Czech Republic) Tomáš Topinka	Kings Lynn	9.98
(Australia) Jason Lyons	Birmingham	9.97
(Finland) Kauko Nieminen	Workington	9.50
(Australia) Shane Parker	Glasgow	9.38

== Riders & final averages ==
Berwick

- Adrian Rymel 10.07
- Michal Makovský 8.27
- Paul Clews 6.92
- Norbert Magosi 6.47
- Tero Aarnio 6.36
- Scott Smith 5.87
- Guglielmo Franchetti 4.91
- Tony Atkin 4.67
- Adam McKinna 3.03

Birmingham

- Jason Lyons 9.97
- Adam Roynon 8.65
- Tomasz Piszcz 7.88
- Craig Watson 7.68
- Kyle Legault 7.37
- James Birkinshaw 5.56
- Lee Smart 5.21
- Jack Roberts 4.38
- Ben Taylor 3.79
- James Cockle 3.67
- Jack Hargreaves 3.59
- Jay Herne 2.94

Edinburgh

- Ryan Fisher 8.80
- Matthew Wethers 8.28
- William Lawson 8.00
- Thomas H. Jonasson 7.78
- Andrew Tully 7.73
- Derek Sneddon 7.11
- Aaron Summers 6.15

Glasgow

- Shane Parker 9.38
- Robert Ksiezak 6.97
- Trent Leverington 6.80
- Josh Grajczonek 6.22
- Ross Brady 5.79
- Lee Dicken 5.55
- Anders Andersen 4.58
- Mitchell Davey 2.94

Isle of Wight

- Jason Bunyan 8.07
- Krzysztof Stojanowski 7.35
- Cory Gathercole 7.32
- Paul Fry 7.10
- Glen Phillips 7.00
- James Holder 6.10
- Richard Sweetman 5.82
- Andrew Bargh 3.96

King's Lynn

- Kevin Doolan 10.47
- Tomáš Topinka 9.98
- Shaun Tacey 7.28
- Russell Harrison 7.12
- Simon Lambert 6.61
- John Oliver 6.35
- Kozza Smith 6.23

Mildenhall

- Kaj Laukkanen 8.17
- Robbie Kessler 7.44
- Theo Pijper 4.98
- Michał Rajkowski 4.66
- Sebastian Truminski 4.57
- Jan Graversen 4.51
- Marek Mroz 4.35
- Mark Baseby 3.46
- Henning Loof 3.05
- Casper Wortmann 3.05
- Luke Priest 2.67
- Jari Makinen 2.31
- Matthew Wright 2.29

Newcastle

- Josef Franc 7.89
- Jason King 7.82
- Kenni Larsen 7.79
- Christian Henry 7.28
- George Štancl 7.20
- Ben Powell 5.43
- Richard Juul 4.31
- Sean Stoddart 4.18
- Jamie Robertson 3.79
- Jerran Hart 3.59

Newport (withdrew from league)

- Craig Watson 6.60
- Tony Atkin 6.44
- Sebastian Truminski 6.27
- Nick Simmons 5.91
- Paul Clews 5.49
- Marek Mroz 4.63
- Jerran Hart 2.40

Reading

- Ulrich Østergaard 10.29
- Mark Lemon 8.04
- Tom P. Madsen 6.66
- Chris Mills 5.76
- Tomáš Suchánek 5.34
- Jamie Smith 5.07
- Nicki Glanz 4.59
- Danny Warwick 4.56

Redcar

- Gary Havelock 9.27
- James Grieves 9.10
- Ty Proctor 8.24
- Chris Kerr 7.54
- Josh Auty 5.45
- Daniel Giffard 4.16
- Benji Compton 4.00
- Arlo Bugeja 3.63
- Joni Keskinen 1.28

Rye House

- Tai Woffinden 10.15
- Stefan Ekberg 8.11
- Chris Neath 8.10
- Tommy Allen 7.79
- Robert Mear 7.15
- Luke Bowen 6.20
- Danny Betson 5.03
- Daniel Halsey 3.78

Scunthorpe

- Magnus Karlsson 7.90
- Richard Hall 7.17
- Andrew Moore 7.16
- Carl Wilkinson 6.93
- Viktor Bergström 6.58
- Emiliano Sanchez 6.42
- Ben Powell 5.49
- Byron Bekker 4.62
- Benji Compton 3.52

Sheffield

- Andre Compton 9.09
- Ricky Ashworth 8.25
- Joel Parsons 7.29
- Ben Wilson 7.26
- Paul Cooper 6.38
- Lee Smethills 5.92
- Sam Martin 2.56
- Kyle Hughes 2.30

Somerset

- Jason Doyle 10.28
- Emil Kramer 8.14
- Simon Walker 8.05
- Jordan Frampton 7.31
- Stephan Katt 6.66
- Brent Werner 6.34
- Matthias Kröger 6.29

Stoke

- Ben Barker 8.23
- Lee Complin 7.95
- Andrew Moore 6.87
- Emiliano Sanchez 6.39
- Mark Burrows 5.64
- Jesper Kristiansen 5.63
- Klaus Jakobsen 5.48
- Barrie Evans 5.04
- Krister Jacobsen 4.64

Workington

- Daniel Nermark 10.53
- Kauko Nieminen .9.50
- Carl Stonehewer 7.93
- Joe Haines 6.22
- Charles Wright 5.12
- Tomi Reima 5.03
- John Branney 4.79
- Scott Smith 3.28

== See also ==
- List of United Kingdom Speedway League Champions
- Knockout Cup (speedway)
