= 2009 Premier League speedway season =

British motorcycle speedway season

- League: Premier League
- Champions: King's Lynn Stars
- Knockout Cup: King's Lynn Stars
- Premier Trophy: King's Lynn Stars
- Young Shield: Workington Comets
- Pairs: Birmingham Brummies
- Fours: Workington Comets
- Individual: Ricky Ashworth
- Highest average: Darcy Ward
- Division/s above: 2009 Elite League
- Division/s below: 2009 National League

The 2009 Premier League season was the second division of motorcycle speedway racing in the United Kingdom and the 15th season since its creation in 1995. The league is governed by the Speedway Control Board (SCB), in conjunction with the British Speedway Promoters' Association (BSPA).

== Summary ==
The League consisted of 14 teams for the 2009 season with the re-admission of the Newport Wasps and the loss of Mildenhall Fen Tigers, Isle of Wight Islanders (Both dropped to National League) and the Reading Racers (Loss of Stadium). New rules introduced for 2009 with a complete revamp of the points scoring system. The team finishing at the top of the league table at the end of the season after accumulating the most points were declared the Premier League champions. The four highest placed teams were entered into promotion play-offs, whereby the Premier League play-off winner faced the bottom Elite League team over two legs. Teams finishing in fifth to twelfth at the time of the fixture cut-off date compete in the Young Shield.

The Kings Lynn Stars were crowned the Premier League champions after ending the season as the highest placed team. The Edinburgh Monarchs finished second, Newcastle Diamonds third and the Birmingham Brummies fourth. All four teams took part in the promotion play-off with Edinburgh and King's Lynn reaching the final. Edinburgh won 97–83 on aggregate and faced Elite League team Belle Vue Aces, but lost the two-legged promotion/relegation final.

== New points scoring system ==
A new points scoring systems was devised for the 2009 season in an effort to make teams more competitive even when losing. If a Home team were to win by 7 or more points they would receive 3 points for the win. However, if the away team restricted the win from 1-6 points, the home team would receive only 2 points for the win, and the away team would be awarded 1 point for losing by less than 7 away from home.
If the match was a draw, the home team would be awarded 1 point and the away team awarded 2.
If the away team won the match by between 1-6 points, they would be awarded 3 points with the home team collecting 0. And finally if the away team won by 7 or more points, they would collect 4 points with the home team again collecting 0.

== League ==
=== League table ===
Pos	Club	M	Home				Away					F	A	Pts
Pos	Club	M	3W	2W	D	L	4W	3W	D	1L	L	F	A	Pts
1	Kings Lynn Stars	26	13	0	0	0	4	2	0	3	4	1378	1013	64
2	Edinburgh Monarchs	26	11	2	0	0	2	1	1	1	8	1378	1122	51
3	Newcastle Diamonds	26	12	1	0	0	1	1	1	2	8	1241	1139	49
4	Birmingham Brummies	26	9	2	0	2	1	3	0	5	4	1232	1139	49
5	Redcar Bears	26	10	1	1	1	0	2	0	5	6	1174	1197	44
6	Somerset Rebels	26	9	4	0	0	0	1	0	4	8	1199	1177	42
7	Workington Comets	26	7	4	1	1	1	1	1	2	8	1170	1215	41
8	Sheffield Tigers	26	10	0	1	2	1	0	0	4	8	1192	1179	39
9	Rye House Rockets	26	9	3	0	1	0	0	0	4	9	1211	1174	37
10	Scunthorpe Scorpions	26	8	4	0	1	0	1	0	2	10	1195	1199	37
11	Stoke Potters	26	7	5	0	1	0	0	1	1	11	1096	1275	32
12	Berwick Bandits	26	6	3	1	3	0	2	0	0	11	1128	1257	31
13	Glasgow Tigers	26	3	4	0	6	0	1	0	2	10	1122	1238	22
14	Newport Wasps	26	2	3	1	7	0	0	1	1	11	1074	1303	16

Key:
Premier League play-offs

Home: 3W = Home win by 7 points or more; 2W = Home win by between 1 and 6 points
Away: 4W = Away win by 7 points or more; 3W = Away win by between 1 and 6 points; 1L = Away loss by 6 points or less
M = Meetings; D = Draws; L = Losses; F = Race points for; A = Race points against; +/- = Race points difference; Pts = Total Points

Last updated: October 20, 2010

Source: BSPA

=== Fixtures and results ===
Home \ Away	BER	BIR	ED	GLA	KL	ND	NW	RED	RYE	SCU	SHE	SOM	STO	WOR
Berwick Bandits		42–48	51–41	47–46	46–49	51–39	45–45	50–40	51–42	47–43	63–29	48–42	54–42	42–48
Birmingham Brummies	54–39		41–49	44–46	55–36	50–39	52–43	47–43	58–36	57–38	49–43	50–43	58–34	53–39
Edinburgh Monarchs	60–30	38–34		50–39	46–45	55–40	51–41	60–33	50–42	51–40	51–39	42–33	60–31	55–39
Glasgow Tigers	42–48	49–41	55–38		41–49	43–47	66–26	45–48	48–42	49–43	40–50	48–45	48–42	41–49
King's Lynn Stars	65–25	55–38	54–38	64–29		64–28	59–33	57–38	66–27	56–37	59–35	59–33	69–23	60–34
Newcastle Diamonds	55–39	48–45	54–38	53–27	51–42		66–27	64–26	55–38	52–43	47–37	55–37	52–40	62–28
Newport Wasps	44–45	41–51	43–47	50–40	44–46	38–52		49–43	48–42	44–46	51–41	44–48	44–44	47–43
Redcar Bears	53–40	49–43	47–39	49–41	38–54	47–47	52–39		52–41	50–40	59–37	52–41	53–42	51–41
Rye House Rockets	59–33	43–46	56–36	56–37	46–43	61–32	45–44	49–44		53–39	52–38	57–35	65–30	58–35
Scunthorpe Scorpions	51–42	45–48	49–44	50–40	57–35	51–45	56–39	49–44	49–41		57–38	47–43	59–31	51–39
Sheffield Tigers	51–39	55–41	42–51	51–39	50–40	58–37	60–34	36–42	62–33	52–38		59–32	54–39	46–46
Somerset Rebels	61–35	48–42	50–40	58–36	46–44	54–39	59–34	53–40	46–44	53–40	48–42		54–40	52–41
Stoke Potters	49–41	47–43	49–40	50–42	33–57	51–38	51–39	47–43	48–42	56–37	45–44	49–40		48–42
Workington Comets	59–35	51–44	45–45	48–45	42–51	49–44	53–43	46–38	49–41	50–40	47–43	50–45	57–35	

Legend: Blue = home team win; Yellow = draw; Red = away team win.

== Play-offs ==
Semi-finals

Leg 1

4 October 2009	Newcastle Diamonds	50 – 41	Edinburgh Monarchs	Newcastle Stadium
Mark Lemon 11+1	Kevin Wölbert 16

7 October 2009	Birmingham Brummies	43 – 47	Kings Lynn Stars	Perry Barr Stadium
Richard Sweetman 10+2	Darcy Ward 15

Leg 2

9 October 2009	Edinburgh Monarchs	52 (93) – (93) 43; 8 - 4 Sudden Death	Newcastle Diamonds	Armadale Stadium
Ryan Fisher 13	Rene Bach 13

14 October 2009	King's Lynn Stars	55 (102) - (78) 35	Birmingham Brummies	Norfolk Arena
Chris Schramm 14+1	Richard Sweetman 9+1

Grand final

First leg

16 October 2009; 19.45	Edinburgh Monarchs	56 - 36	King's Lynn Stars	Armadale Stadium
Kevin Wölbert 14	William Lawson 11+1

1	Ryan Fisher	3, 2', 2, 1', 1	9+2
2	Michał Rajkowski	0, 3, 3, 0	6
3	Andrew Tully	3, 0, 3, 3	9
4	Matthew Wethers	2', 3, 2', 2'	9+3
5	Kevin Wölbert	3, 3, 3, 2, 3	14
6	Aaron Summers	3, 0, 2', 0	5+1
7	Kalle Katajisto	0, X, 1, 3	4
Manager: Alan Bridgett

1	William Lawson (guest)	1', 2, 2, 1^, 3, 2	11+1
2	Tomáš Topinka	, ,	R/R
3	Chris Schramm	2, X, 2, 3, 4^, X	11
4	Emiliano Sanchez	1, 1', 1', 1, 1	5+2
5	Josh Auty (guest)	2, 1, 1, 0, X	4
6	Linus Eklöf	2, 0, 0, 1', 0	3+1
7	Jan Graversen	1', 1', 0, N	2+2
Manager: Rob Lyon

Second leg

20 October 2009; 19.30	King's Lynn Stars	47 (83) - 41 (97)	Edinburgh Monarchs	Norfolk Arena
Chris Schramm 11+1	Kevin Wölbert 12

1	Ulrich Ostergaard (guest)	1', 2, 3, 2, 1'	9+2
2	Kozza Smith	, ,	R/R
3	Emiliano Sanchez	3, 1', X, 1', 1'	6+3
4	Chris Schramm	2', 2, 2, 3, 2	11+1
5	Ty Proctor (guest)	0, 3, 3, X	6
6	Linus Eklöf	1', 1', 1, 0, 2, 2'	7+3
7	Jan Graversen	2, 2, 2, 2, 0	8
Manager: Rob Lyon

1	Ryan Fisher	3, 3, 2, X	8
2	Michał Rajkowski	0, 0, F	0
3	Andrew Tully	1, 0, 2, 3, 0	6
4	Matthew Wethers	0, 2, 1', 0	3+1
5	Kevin Wölbert	3, 3, 0, 3, 3	12
6	aron Summers	0, 0, 3, 0	3
7	Kalle Katajisto	3, 1, 3, 1', 1	9+1
Manager: Alan Bridgett

== Premier League Knockout Cup ==
The 2009 Premier League Knockout Cup was the 42nd edition of the Knockout Cup for tier two teams. King's Lynn Stars were the winners of the competition.

First round

Date	Team one	Score	Team two
09/05	Stoke Potters	48-42	Berwick Bandits
06/05	Berwick Bandits	50-39	Stoke Potters
10/05	Newcastle Diamonds	48-42	Scunthorpe Scorpions
08/05	Scunthorpe Scorpions	65-25	Newcastle Diamonds
29/04	Birmingham Brummies	43-47	Rye House Rockets
09/05	Rye House Rockets	53-37	Birmingham Brummies
14/05	Redcar Bears	52-38	Newport Wasps
21/06	Newport Wasps	40-50	Redcar Bears
08/05	Somerset Rebels	46-44	Glasgow Tigers
24/05	Glasgow Tigers	45-44	Somerset Rebels
28/05	Sheffield Tigers	56-34	Edinburgh Monarchs
08/05	Edinburgh Monarchs	59-31	Sheffield Tigers

Quarter-finals

Date	Team one	Score	Team two
20/05	King's Lynn Stars	58-32	Berwick Bandits
20/06	Berwick Bandits	26-57	King's Lynn Stars
13/06	Rye House Rockets	56-34	Somerset Rebels
12/06	Somerset Rebels	53-37	Rye House Rockets
20/06	Workington Comets	47-43	Edinburgh Monarchs
19/06	Edinburgh Monarchs	56-34	Workington Comets
13/08	Redcar Bears	46-44	Scunthorpe Scorpions
31/07	Scunthorpe Scorpions	50-39	Redcar Bears

Semi-finals

Date	Team one	Score	Team two
09/10	Scunthorpe Scorpions	45-27	King's Lynn Stars
06/10	King's Lynn Stars	70-20	Scunthorpe Scorpions
19/09	Rye House Rockets	49-41	Edinburgh Monarchs
11/09	Edinburgh Monarchs	63-27	Rye House Rockets

Final

First leg

23 October 2009

Edinburgh Monarchs; Kevin Wölbert 13; Ryan Fisher 11; Matthew Wethers 10; Andrew Tully 9 Kalle Katajisto 3 Aaron Summers 2 Michał Rajkowski R/R	48 – 41	King's Lynn Stars; Jan Graversen 14; Darcy Ward 11; Emiliano Sanchez 6 Ty Proctor (guest) 6 Linus Eklöf 3 Chris Schramm 1 Kozza Smith R/R	Armadale Stadium

Second leg

28 October 2009

King's Lynn Stars; Chris Schramm 14; Ty Proctor (guest) 13; Emiliano Sanchez 11; Linus Eklöf 10; Jan Graversen 6 Simon Lambert (guest) 3 Darcy Ward R/R	57 – 33	Edinburgh Monarchs; Ryan Fisher 14; Kalle Katajisto 9 Matthew Wethers 5 Andrew Tully 4 Aaron Summers 0 Luke Bowen 0 Kevin Wölbert R/R	Norfolk Arena

King's Lynn were declared Knockout Cup Champions, winning on aggregate 98–81.

== Premier Trophy ==
North Group

Pos	Team	P	W	D	L	Pts
1	Edinburgh	12	8	1	3	28
2	Workington	12	7	0	5	21
3	Glasgow	12	6	0	6	19
4	Berwick	12	5	2	5	19
5	Sheffield	12	5	1	6	18
6	Sheffield	12	6	0	6	17
7	Newcastle	12	3	0	9	7

South Group

Pos	Team	P	W	D	L	Pts
1	King's Lynn	12	9	0	3	33
2	Scunthorpe	12	6	0	6	21
3	Rye House	12	7	0	5	20
4	Somerset	12	6	1	5	20
5	Stoke	12	6	1	5	18
6	Newport	12	4	1	7	12
7	Birmingham	12	2	1	9	7

Home \ Away	BER	ED	GLA	NEW	RED	SHE	WOR
Berwick		46–46	56–39	57–36	53–40	45–45	52–38
Edinburgh	53–43		53–40	64–26	57–35	53–39	60–34
Glasgow	55–40	44–46		55–35	52–38	52–38	50–43
Newcastle	39–51	46–44	48–45		51–39	39–50	43–47
Redcar	47–43	41–47	54–41	53–37		53–40	48–42
Sheffield	62–33	50–39	47–48	53–42	40–55		53–42
Workington	53–39	48–42	54–41	51–42	51–38	56–37	

Legend: Blue = home team win; Yellow = draw; Red = away team win.

Home \ Away	BIR	KL	NWP	RYE	SCU	SOM	STO
Birmingham		39–53	43–47	50–40	41–48	47–41	45–45
King's Lynn	63–30		63–31	58–35	62–31	62–32	69–21
Newport	50–40	39–51		49–41	49–46	46–46	37–55
Rye House	57–39	49–44	52–40		67–25	55–37	63–30
Scunthorpe	53–41	38–54	52–38	52–43		53–40	57–37
Somerset	52–43	46–44	56–36	49–41	56–38		48–35
Stoke	48–45	48–42	51–42	46–47	46–41	55–40	

Legend: Blue = home team win; Yellow = draw; Red = away team win.

Semi-final

Team one	Team two	Score
Workington	King's Lynn	51–39, 35–58
Scunthorpe	Edinburgh	44–46, 41–52

Final

Team one	Team two	Score
Edinburgh	King's Lynn	54–41, 38–58

== Young Shield ==
- End of season competition for the league teams positioned 5 to 12.

First Round

Team one	Team two	Score
Berwick	Workington	37–57, 47–43
Redcar	Scunthorpe	49–43, 34–56
Stoke	Somerset	52–43, 43–49
Sheffield	Rye House	51–38, 41–55

Semi-final

Team one	Team two	Score
Stoke	Workington	39–39, 36–54
Scunthorpe	Rye House	51–42, 40–50

Final

Team one	Team two	Score
Rye House	Workington	54–42, 38–55

== Riders' Championship ==
Ricky Ashworth won the Riders' Championship. The final was held on 27 September at Owlerton Stadium.

Placing	Rider	Total	1	2	3	4	5	6	7	8	9	10	11	12	13	14	15	16	17	18	19	20	Pts	Pos	21	22
1	(England) (10) Ricky Ashworth (SHE)	13			3			2						2			3		3				13	1		3
2	(Australia) (15) Darcy Ward (KL)	11				3			1			3						3	1				11	2		2
3	(Australia) (12) Ty Proctor (RED)	11			2					3		2			2						2		11	3	2	1
4	(England) (11) David Howe (SS)	10			1				2		3					3						1	10	6	3	0
5	(Scotland) (5) William Lawson (GLA)	10		3			2					1					2					2	10	4	1	
6	(England) (7) Andre Compton (WOR)	10		0					3					1	3					3			10	5	0	
7	(Denmark) (1) Kenni Larsen (ND)	9	3				3				1				0				2				9	7		
8	(England) (6) Jordan Frampton (NW)	9		2				3			2							1			1		9	8		
9	(United States) (4) Ryan Fisher (EDI)	8	1							2				0				2				3	8	9		
10	(Australia) (13) Jason Lyons (BIR)	7				0	1							3		0					3		7	10		
11	(Australia) (2) Steve Johnston (SOM)	6	2					0				0				2				2			6	11		
12	(England) (8) Jason Bunyan (STO)	5		1						1			2			1			0				5	12		
13	(Czech Republic) (14) Tomáš Topinka (KL)	5				2		1					1		1							R	5	13		
14	(Sweden) (3) Magnus Karlsson (SS)	3	0						0				3				0				0		3	14		
15	(England) (16) Chris Neath (RH)	2				1				0	0						1			EF			2	15		
16	(Czech Republic) (9) Michal Makovsky (BER)	1			0		0						0					0		1			1	16		
	(England) (17) Adam Wrathall	0																					0			
	(England) (18) Gary Irving	0																					0			
Placing	Rider	Total	1	2	3	4	5	6	7	8	9	10	11	12	13	14	15	16	17	18	19	20	Pts	Pos	21	22

m - exclusion for exceeding two minute time allowance • t - exclusion for touching the tapes • x - other exclusion • e - retired or mechanical failure • f - fell • ns - non-starter • nc - non-classify

gate A - inside	gate B	gate C	gate D - outside

== Pairs ==
The Premier League Pairs Championship was held at Oaktree Arena on 26 June. The event was won by Birmingham Brummies.

Group A
Pos	Team	Pts	Riders
1	King's Lynn	24	Topinka 14, Ward 10
2	Somerset	23	Johnston 12, Kramer 11
3	Scunthorpe	20	Karlsson 11, Howe 9
4	Berwick	13	Franc 7, Makovsky 6
5	Rye House	10	Sundstrom 10, Neath 0

Group B
Pos	Team	Pts	Riders
1	Workington	27	Rymek 14, Doolan 13
2	Birmingham	19	Lyons 12, Piszcz 7
3	Edinburgh	17	Tully 9, Fisher 8
4	Redcar	16	Havelock 10, Proctor 6
5	Glasgow	11	Grieves 7, Brown 4

Semi finals

- Birmingham bt King's Lynn 6–3
- Somerset bt Workington 7–2

Final

- Birmingham bt Somerset 6–3

== Fours ==
Workington Comets won the Premier League Four-Team Championship for the fifth time, the Championship was held on 25 July 2009, at the Derwent Park.

Group A
Pos	Team	Pts	Riders
1	Berwick	14	Makovsky 5, Franc 4, Clews 3, Aarnio 2
2	Somerset	12	Johnston 4, Kramer 4, Gathercole 4, Walker 0, Sedgmen 0
3	King's Lynn	11	Topinka 6, Schramm 4, Sanchez 1, Graversen 0, Smith 0
4	Redcar	11	Proctor 5, Stonehewer 3, Havelock 2, Wilson 1

Group B
Pos	Team	Pts	Riders
1	Workington	18	Compton 6, Rymel 5, Doolan 4, Lawson 3
2	Edinburgh	12	Wethers 5, Fisher 3, Rajkowski 3, Summers 1
3	Rye House	12	Neath 3, Mear 3, Sundstrom 3, Bowen 3
4	Scunthorpe	6	Karlsson 3, Howe 3, Wilkinson 0, Lambert 0

Final
Pos	Team	Pts	Riders
1	Workington	27	Compton 9, Rymel 9, Doolan 7, Lawson 2
2	Somerset	18	Johnston 8, Gathercole 6, Kramer 2, Sedgmen 2, Walker 0
3	Edinburgh	14	Fisher 5, Wethers 4, Summers 3, Rajkowski 2
4	Berwick	13	Clews 5, Makovsky 4, Franc 4, Aarnio 0

== Final Leading averages ==
Rider	Team	Average
(Australia) Darcy Ward	Kings Lynn	9.71
(Czech Republic) Tomáš Topinka	Kings Lynn	9.62
(Australia) Steve Johnston	Somerset	9.46
(Australia) Kevin Doolan	Workington	9.35
(England) David Howe	Scunthorpe	9.18
(Australia) Mark Lemon	Newcastle	9.17
(Scotland) James Grieves	Glasgow	8.97
(Australia) Shane Parker	Glasgow	8.93
(United States) Ryan Fisher	Edinburgh	8.89
(Germany) Kevin Wölbert	Edinburgh	8.97

== Riders & final averages ==
Berwick

- Michal Makovský 8.49
- Josef Franc 8.28
- Stanisław Burza 7.60
- Paul Clews 7.39
- William Lawson 6.02
- Tero Aarnio 5.55
- Guglielmo Franchetti 4.43
- Danny Warwick 4.00
- Tamas Sike 2.81
- Frank Facher 2.59
- Greg Blair 2.33

Birmingham

- Tomasz Piszcz 8.64
- Jason Lyons 8.42
- Richard Sweetman 7.20
- Russell Harrison 6.91
- Ludvig Lindgren 6.73
- Robert Ksiezak 6.12
- Lee Smart 5.25
- Manuel Hauzinger 5.10
- Jay Herne 4.64
- Marek Mroz 3.52
- James Cockle 3.13
- Ben Taylor 2.31

Edinburgh

- Ryan Fisher 8.89
- Kevin Wolbert 8.87
- Andrew Tully 7.83
- Matthew Wethers 7.74
- Thomas H. Jonasson 7.44
- Michał Rajkowski 7.06
- Aaron Summers 6.26
- Sean Stoddart 3.53
- Byron Bekker 3.17
- Max Dilger 2.54

Glasgow

- James Grieves 8.97
- Shane Parker 8.93
- William Lawson 7.79
- Josh Grajczonek 6.78
- Russell Harrison 5.76
- Anders Andersen 5.50
- Lee Dicken 4.91
- Mitchell Davey 4.51
- Peter Juul 2.40

King's Lynn

- Darcy Ward 9.71
- Tomáš Topinka 9.62
- Chris Schramm 8.49
- Emiliano Sanchez 8.12
- Kozza Smith 7.40
- Christian Henry 6.93
- Linus Eklöf 6.39
- Jan Graversen 5.92
- Darren Mallett 5.08

Newcastle

- Mark Lemon 9.17
- Kenni Larsen 8.19
- René Bach 8.17
- Jason King 7.83
- Derek Sneddon 5.86
- Steve Boxall 5.57
- Trent Leverington 5.52
- Craig Branney 4.78
- Adam McKinna 4.10
- Casper Wortmann 2.18

Newport

- Mark Lemon 8.00
- Leigh Lanham 7.64
- Jordan Frampton 7.36
- Paul Fry 6.40
- Chris Kerr 6.19
- Brent Werner 6.00
- James Holder 5.20
- Jonas Andersson 4.14
- Kyle Newman 2.26

Redcar

- Ty Proctor 8.55
- Gary Havelock 8.23
- Ben Wilson 7.90
- Carl Stonehewer 6.97
- Robbie Kessler 6.59
- Stuart Swales 5.18
- Benji Compton 3.85
- Arlo Bugeja 3.52

Rye House

- Chris Neath 7.82
- Linus Sundström 7.46
- Robert Mear 7.42
- Joe Haines 7.39
- Luke Bowen 6.97
- Andrew Silver 6.20
- Tommy Allen 5.11

Scunthorpe

- David Howe 9.18
- Magnus Karlsson 8.67
- Carl Wilkinson 7.04
- Simon Lambert 5.77
- Viktor Bergström 5.67
- Ritchie Hawkins 5.08
- Jerran Hart 4.89
- Byron Bekker 3.52

Sheffield

- Ricky Ashworth 8.42
- Richard Hall 7.88
- Josh Auty 7.51
- Joel Parsons 6.21
- Chris Mills 5.88
- Hugh Skidmore 5.87
- Paul Cooper 5.71
- Ritchie Hawkins 5.39
- Scott Smith 4.53

Somerset

- Steve Johnston 9.46
- Emil Kramer 8.79
- Cory Gathercole 8.23
- Simon Walker 5.77
- Justin Sedgmen 5.16
- Nick Simmons 4.89
- Jay Herne 4.57
- Tom Brown 4.30
- Jari Makinen 2.27

Stoke

- Jason Bunyan 8.55
- Lee Complin 7.63
- Phil Morris 5.89
- Klaus Jakobsen 5.82
- Tom P. Madsen 5.76
- Jesper Kristiansen 5.62
- Robert Ksiezak 5.06
- Craig Branney 4.00
- Glen Phillips 3.38

Workington

- Kevin Doolan 9.35
- Adrian Rymel 8.74
- Andre Compton 8.18
- Richard Lawson 5.57
- John Branney 5.37
- Charles Wright 5.36
- Craig Cook 3.93
- Luke Priest 2.54

== See also ==
- List of United Kingdom Speedway League Champions
- Knockout Cup (speedway)
