= 2010 Premier League Knock-Out Cup =

The 2010 Premier League Knock-Out Cup was the 43rd edition of the Knockout Cup for tier two teams in the United Kingdom. It was contested throughout the Premier League season. The reigning champions were the Kings Lynn Stars. The 2010 champions were the Newcastle Diamonds after beating the Edinburgh Monarchs 91–88 over a two-legged final.

== Knock-out stages ==
Round 1
Somerset Rebels | BYE
- | -
5 May & 13 May
Birmingham Brummies | 117
Sheffield Tigers | 61
9 May & 14 May
Newcastle Diamonds | 100
Scunthorpe Scorpions | 80
Redcar Bears | BYE
- | -
8 May & 9 May
Berwick Bandits | 94
Newport Wasps | 85
22 May & 23 May
Workington Comets | 106
Stoke Potters | 74
5 May & 23 May
Kings Lynn Stars | 105
Glasgow Tigers | 75
7 May & 5 June
Edinburgh Monarchs | 106
Rye House Rockets | 74

Quarter-finals
25 June & 30 June
Somerset Rebels | 73
Birmingham Brummies | 107
24 June & 27 June
Newcastle Diamonds | 100
Redcar Bears | 80
26 June & 27 June
Berwick Bandits | 81
Workington Comets | 98
28 July & 20 Aug
Kings Lynn Stars | 65
Edinburgh Monarchs | 114

Semi-finals
10 Oct & 13 Oct
Birmingham Brummies | 85
Newcastle Diamonds | 96
17 Sept & 18 Sept
Workington Comets | 64
Edinburgh Monarchs | 99

Final
29 Oct & 31 Oct
Newcastle Diamonds | 91
Edinburgh Monarchs | 88

== Round 1 ==
The draw for the 2010 Premier League KOC was taking at the 2009 AGM. 12 teams were drawn against each other, with 2 teams receiving 'byes' into the quarter-finals. These two teams that received a bye were the Redcar Bears and the Somerset Rebels.

=== Aggregate scores ===
| Berwick Bandits | 94–85 | Newport Wasps |

| Birmingham Brummies | 117–61 | Sheffield Tigers |

| Edinburgh Monarchs | 106–74 | Rye House Rockets |

| Kings Lynn Stars | 105–75 | Glasgow Tigers |

| Newcastle Diamonds | 100–80 | Scunthorpe Scorpions |

| Workington Comets | 106–74 | Stoke Potters |

=== First leg ===
5 May

| Birmingham Brummies | 63–25 | Sheffield Tigers |
|---|---|---|
| (Australia) Jason Lyons 14+1 | | (Czech Republic) Josef Franc 10 |

5 May

| Kings Lynn Stars | 57–33 | Glasgow Tigers |
|---|---|---|
| | | (Australia) Josh Grajzonek 12 |

7 May

| Edinburgh Monarchs | 51–39 | Rye House Rockets |
|---|---|---|
| (Finland) Kalle Katajisto 16 | | (Sweden) Linus Sundstrom 12 |

8 May

| Berwick Bandits | 55–35 | Newport Wasps |
|---|---|---|
| (Czech Republic) Michal Makovsky 16+1 | | (Canada) Kyle Legault 9 |

9 May

| Newcastle Diamonds | 59–31 | Scunthorpe Scorpions |
|---|---|---|
| (Australia) Mark Lemon 13+1 | | (Finland) Kalle Katajisto (Guest) 15 |

22 May

| Workington Comets | 54–36 | Stoke Potters |
|---|---|---|
| (United Kingdom) Craig Cook 18 | | (Czech Republic) Hynek Stichauer 9 |

=== Second leg ===
9 May

| Newport Wasps | 50–39 | Berwick Bandits |
|---|---|---|
| (United Kingdom) Leigh Lanham 12 | | (Czech Republic) Adrian Rymel 12 |

13 May

| Sheffield Tigers | 36–54 | Birmingham Brummies |
|---|---|---|
| (United Kingdom) Paul Cooper 8+1 | | (Australia) Steve Johnston 13+2 |

14 May

| Scunthorpe Scorpions | 49–41 | Newcastle Diamonds |
|---|---|---|
| (United Kingdom) Carl Wilkinson 15 | | (Denmark) Kenni Larsen 11+1 |

23 May

| Glasgow Tigers | 42–48 | Kings Lynn Stars |
|---|---|---|
| (Australia) Travis McGowan 11+1 | | (Australia) Kevin Doolan 15 |

23 May

| Stoke Potters | 38–52 | Workington Comets |
|---|---|---|
| (United Kingdom) Lee Smart 8+2 | | (Denmark) Peter Kildemand 12+2 |

5 June

| Rye House Rockets | 35–55 | Edinburgh Monarchs |
|---|---|---|
| (Sweden) Linus Sundstrom 14 | | (Finland) Kalle Katajisto 13 |

== Quarter finals ==
8 Teams qualified for the quarter-finals of the PLKOC. These included the Somerset Rebels and the Redcar Bears who received 'byes' through to the quarter-finals. The other six teams were Berwick Bandits, Birmingham Brummies, Edinburgh Monarchs, Kings Lynn Stars, Newcastle Diamonds, and Workington Comets. All 6 qualified through being victorious in Round 1 of the competition

=== Aggregate scores ===
| Birmingham Brummies | 107–73 | Somerset Rebels |

| Edinburgh Monarchs | 114–65 | Kings Lynn Stars |

| Newcastle Diamonds | 100–80 | Redcar Bears |

| Workington Comets | 98–81 | Berwick Bandits |

=== First leg ===
24 June

| Redcar Bears | 43–47 | Newcastle Diamonds |
|---|---|---|
| (Czech Republic) Tomas Suchanek 13+1 | | (Australia) Mark Lemon 15 |

25 June

| Somerset Rebels | 42–48 | Birmingham Brummies |
|---|---|---|
| (Australia) Sam Masters 11 | | (Australia) Jason Lyons 14 |

26 June

| Berwick Bandits | 46–44 | Workington Comets |
|---|---|---|
| (United Kingdom) Paul Clews 13+1 | | (United Kingdom) Chris Schramm 12+1 |

28 July

| Kings Lynn Stars | 34–56 | Edinburgh Monarchs |
|---|---|---|
| – | | – |

=== Second leg ===
27 June

| Newcastle Diamonds | 53–37 | Redcar Bears |
|---|---|---|
| (Denmark) Kenni Larsen 15 | | (Argentina) Emiliano Sanchez 10+1 |

27 June

| Workington Comets | 54–35 | Berwick Bandits |
|---|---|---|
| (United Kingdom) Craig Cook 14 | | (Czech Republic) Adrian Rymel 12+1 |

30 June

| Birmingham Brummies | 59–31 | Somerset Rebels |
|---|---|---|
| (Australia) Richard Sweetman 16+1 | | (Australia) Shane Parker 8 |

20 August

| Edinburgh Monarchs | 58–31 | Kings Lynn Stars |
|---|---|---|
| (Germany) Kevin Wolbert 14 | | (United Kingdom) Oliver Allen 10 |

== Semi finals ==
4 Teams qualified for the semi-finals of the PLKOC. These were Birmingham Brummies, Edinburgh Monarchs, Newcastle Diamonds and Workington Comets. All were victorious in there quarter final ties.

=== Aggregate scores ===
| Edinburgh Monarchs | 99–64 | Workington Comets |

| Newcastle Diamonds | 96–85 | Birmingham Brummies |

=== First leg ===
17 September

| Edinburgh Monarchs | 64–26 | Workington Comets |
|---|---|---|
| – | | – |

10 October

| Newcastle Diamonds | 56–35 | Birmingham Brummies |
|---|---|---|
| (Australia) Mark Lemon 15+2 | | (Australia) Aaron Summers 11 |

=== Second leg ===
18 September

| Workington Comets | 38–35 | Edinburgh Monarchs |
|---|---|---|
| – | | – |

13 October

| Birmingham Brummies | 50–40 | Newcastle Diamonds |
|---|---|---|
| (Australia) Aaron Summers 15 | | (Australia) Dakota North 12 |

== The final ==
The Final was competed between the Edinburgh Monarchs and the Newcastle Diamonds. It was raced over two legs on 29 October and 31 October.

| Newcastle Diamonds | 91 – 88 | Edinburgh Monarchs |

=== First leg ===
29 October 2010
19:30

| Edinburgh Monarchs | 47–42 | Newcastle Diamonds |
|---|---|---|
| (United Kingdom) William Lawson 12 | | (Denmark) Kenni Larsen 12 |

| 1 | (United States) Ryan Fisher | Fx, Fx, 3, 2', 2 | 7+1 |
| 2 | (United Kingdom) Andrew Tully | , | R/R |
| 3 | (Germany) Kevin Wolbert | 2, 2, 1, 2', | 7+1 |
| 4 | (Finland) Kalle Katajisto | 1', 1', 1', 3, 2 | 8+3 |
| 5 | (Australia) Matthew Wethers | 2, 2, 2, 3, 1' | 10+1 |
| 6 | (United Kingdom) Ashley Morris | 1, 0, 1', 1' | 3+2 |
| 7 | (United Kingdom) William Lawson | 3, 3, 0, Fx, 2, 1, 3 | 12 |
Manager:

| 1 | (Denmark) Kenni Larsen | 2, 3, 3, 1, 3 | 12 |
| 2 | (United Kingdom) Jason King | , | R/R |
| 3 | (United Kingdom) Derek Sneddon | 0, 1, R, 0, 1 | 2 |
| 4 | (Denmark) Rene Bach | 3, 3, 2, 3, 0 | 11 |
| 5 | (United Kingdom) David Howe (Guest) | 3, 3, 3, 2, 0 | 11 |
| 6 | (United Kingdom) Adam Roynon (Guest) | 2, 0, N, N | 2 |
| 7 | (United Kingdom) Adam McKinna | 1', 0, 1, 2', 0, 0, NS | 4+2 |
Manager: George English

=== Second leg ===
31 October 2010
18:30

| Newcastle Diamonds | 49–41 | Edinburgh Monarchs |
|---|---|---|
| (United Kingdom) Stuart Robson (Guest) 14+1 | | (United States) Ryan Fisher 11 |

| 1 | (Denmark) Kenni Larsen | 3, 3, 2, 3, 1' | 12+1 |
| 2 | (United Kingdom) Jason King | , | R/R |
| 3 | (United Kingdom) Derek Sneddon | 0, 2', 1', 0, 2 | 5+2 |
| 4 | (Denmark) Rene Bach | 3, 2, 3, 3, 2 | 13 |
| 5 | (United Kingdom) Stuart Robson (Guest) | 3, 3, 3, 3, 2' | 14+1 |
| 6 | (United Kingdom) Simon Lambert | 1', R, N, N | 1+1 |
| 7 | (United Kingdom) Adam McKinna | 2, 1, 0, 0, 1', 0, 0 | 4+2 |
Manager: George English

| 1 | (United States) Ryan Fisher | 2, 3, 2, 1, 3 | 11 |
| 2 | (United Kingdom) Andrew Tully | , | R/R |
| 3 | (Germany) Kevin Wolbert | 1, 1', 1, 3 | 6+1 |
| 4 | (Finland) Kalle Katajisto | Fx, 2, 2, 3, 2, 0 | 9 |
| 5 | (Australia) Matthew Wethers | 0, 2, 2, 0 | 4 |
| 6 | (United Kingdom) Ashley Morris | 0, 1', 1', 0 | 2+2 |
| 7 | (United Kingdom) William Lawson | 1', 3, 2, 0, 1', 1, 1' | 9+3 |
Manager:

== See also ==
- Speedway in the United Kingdom
