= 2010 Premier Trophy (speedway) =

The 2010 Premier Trophy was contested prior to the start of the Premier League season. The Reigning champions were the Kings Lynn Stars. The 2010 champions were the Newcastle Diamonds after beating the Birmingham Brummies 104–80 over a two legged final. The 2010 campaign was the last Premier Trophy campaign as it was dropped for the 2011 season.

== North Group ==
The North Group was contested between Berwick Bandits, Edinburgh Monarchs, Glasgow Tigers, Newcastle Diamonds and Workington Comets. Newcastle topped the group and qualified for the Premier Trophy Semi-finals.

=== Fixtures & Results ===
Home\Away	BER	EDI	GLA	ND	WOR
Berwick Bandits		48-42	52-39	45-45	52-39
Edinburgh Monarchs	62-25		43-52	44-46	55-38
Glasgow Tigers	58-35	58-37		43-47	42-48
Newcastle Diamonds	54-37	56-37	43-47		50-41
Workington Comets	44-45	52-40	53-43	43-47	

Last updated: December 10, 2010. Source: BSPA

Colours: Blue = home win; Red = away win; White = draw

Home team listed in the left-hand column

=== Table ===
Pos	Club	M	Home				Away					F	A	+/-	Pts
Pos	Club	M	3W	2W	D	L	4W	3W	D	1L	L	F	A	+/-	Pts
1	Newcastle Diamonds	8	3	0	0	1	0	3	1	0	0	388	337		20
2	Glasgow Tigers	8	2	0	0	2	1	1	0	0	2	382	358		13
3	Berwick Bandits	8	2	1	1	0	0	1	0	0	3	339	386		12
4	Workington Comets	8	2	0	0	2	0	1	0	0	3	358	374		9
5	Edinburgh Monarchs	8	2	0	0	2	0	0	0	1	3	363	375		7

== Midland Group ==
The Midland Group was contested between Birmingham Brummies, Redcar Bears, Scunthorpe Scorpions, Sheffield Tigers and Stoke Potters. Birmingham topped the group and qualified for the Premier Trophy Semi-finals. They also remained unbeaten throughout the group stage becoming the first team in the Premier Trophy to achieve this feat.

=== Fixtures & Results ===
Home\Away	BIR	RED	SS	SHE	STO
Birmingham Brummies		44-33	54-41	45-45	65-29
Redcar Bears	37-53		42-48	44-49	51-44
Scunthorpe Scorpions	41-49	50-42		43-33	49-44
Sheffield Tigers	41-52	67-25	49-43		55-40
Stoke Potters	32-60	42-54	44-44	49-44	

Last updated: December 10, 2010. Source: BSPA

Colours: Blue = home win; Red = away win; White = draw

Home team listed in the left-hand column

=== Table ===
Pos	Club	M	Home				Away					F	A	+/-	Pts
Pos	Club	M	3W	2W	D	L	4W	3W	D	1L	L	F	A	+/-	Pts
1	Birmingham Brummies	8	4	0	0	0	4	0	0	0	0	436	290		28
2	Scunthorpe Scorpions	8	2	1	0	1	0	1	1	1	1	359	357		14
3	Sheffield Tigers	8	2	1	0	1	0	1	0	1	2	374	355		12
4	Redcar Bears	8	1	0	0	3	1	0	0	0	3	328	397		7
5	Stoke Potters	8	0	1	1	2	0	0	0	1	3	324	422		4

== South Group ==
The South Group was contested between Kings Lynn Stars, Newport Wasps, Rye House Rockets, and Somerset Rebels. Rye House topped the group and qualified for the Premier Trophy Semi-finals. Kings Lynn also qualified to the semi-finals been the best placed 2nd place team from the 3 groups.

=== Fixtures & Results ===
Home\Away	KL	NW	RH	SOM
Kings Lynn Stars		58-34	52-41	53-43
Newport Wasps	51-41		45-45	57-37
Rye House Rockets	48-42	67-25		47-43
Somerset Rebels	46-44	47-43	42-48	

Last updated: December 10, 2010. Source: BSPA

Colours: Blue = home win; Red = away win; White = draw

Home team listed in the left-hand column

=== Table ===
Pos	Club	M	Home				Away					F	A	+/-	Pts
Pos	Club	M	3W	2W	D	L	4W	3W	D	1L	L	F	A	+/-	Pts
1	Rye House Rockets	6	1	2	0	0	0	1	1	0	1	296	249		12
2	Kings Lynn Stars	6	3	0	0	0	0	0	0	2	1	290	263		11
3	Newport Wasps	6	2	0	1	0	0	0	0	2	1	255	295		8
4	Somerset Rebels	6	0	2	0	1	0	0	0	1	2	258	292		5

Key:
Qualified for Semi-finals

== Semi-finals ==
=== Leg 1 ===
20 June 2010	Newcastle Diamonds	57 – 37	Kings Lynn Stars	Newcastle Stadium, Newcastle
Kenni Larsen 14	Kevin Doolan 13

20 June 2010	Rye House Rockets	54 – 41	Birmingham Brummies	Rye House Stadium, Hoddesdon
Kyle Hughes 13	Jason Lyons 12

=== Leg 2 ===
23 June 2010	Kings Lynn Stars	44 (81) – (103) 46	Newcastle Diamonds	Norfolk Arena, Kings Lynn
Kevin Doolan 13	Kenni Larsen 13

23 June 2010	Birmingham Brummies	59 (100) - (82) 28	Rye House Rockets	Perry Barr Stadium, Birmingham
Jason Lyons 12	Jordan Frampton 10

== Final ==
=== First leg ===
25 July 2010; 18.30	Newcastle Diamonds	58 - 36	Birmingham Brummies	Newcastle Stadium, Newcastle
Rene Bach 15	Lee Smart 8+2

1	(Denmark) Kenni Larsen	3, 3, 3, 2', X	11+1
2	(Scotland) Derek Sneddon	1, 2', 3, 2'	8+2
3	(England) Jason King	2', 2', 2', 3	9+3
4	(Denmark) Rene Bach	3, 3, 3, 3, 3	15
5	(Australia) Mark Lemon	3, 2, 3, 3	11
6	(Australia) Jade Mudgway (Guest)	0, X, F, N, N	0
7	(Denmark) Anders Andersen	2, N, X, 1, 1, 0
Manager: George English

1	(Australia) Jason Lyons	0, X, 4^, 1, 2	7
2	(Australia) Aaron Summers	, ,	R/R
3	(Australia) Justin Sedgman	0, 1, 1, N	2
4	(Australia) Richard Sweetman	1, 3, 0, 2, 1'	7+1
5	(Australia) Steve Johnston	2, F, 4^, 0, 0	6
6	(England) Kyle Newman	1, 1', 1, 1, 2,	6+1
7	(England) Lee Smart (Guest)	3, 2, N, 1, 1', R, X, 1'	8+2
Manager: Graham Drury

=== Second leg ===
28 July 2010; 18.30	Birmingham Brummies	44 (80) - 46 (104)	Newcastle Diamonds	Perry Barr Stadium, Birmingham
Jason Lyons 11+1	Kenni Larsen 12

1	(Australia) Jason Lyons	1, 3, 3, 2, 2'	11+1
2	(Australia) Aaron Summers	, ,	R/R
3	(Australia) Justin Sedgman	0, 0, 1', 2	3+1
4	(Australia) Richard Sweetman	2, 3, 2, 0, 3	10
5	(Australia) Steve Johnston	2, 2, 3, 2, 1'	10+1
6	(England) Kyle Newman	R, 1', X, 1', 2,	4+2
7	(England) Lee Smart (Guest)	0, 3, 1, 2', 0, 0,	6+1
Manager: Graham Drury

1	(Denmark) Kenni Larsen	3, 2, 3, 3, 1	12
2	(Scotland) Derek Sneddon	2', 1', 1, 0	4+2
3	(England) Jason King	1, 1, 1', 1	4+1
4	(Denmark) Rene Bach	3, 3, 2, 3, 0	11
5	(Australia) Mark Lemon	3, 2, 3, X	8
6	(Australia) Dakota North	2, R, 0, 3, 1	6
7	(Denmark) Anders Andersen	1', 0, 0, N	1+1
Manager: George English
