= Robbie Blackadder =

Australian speedway rider

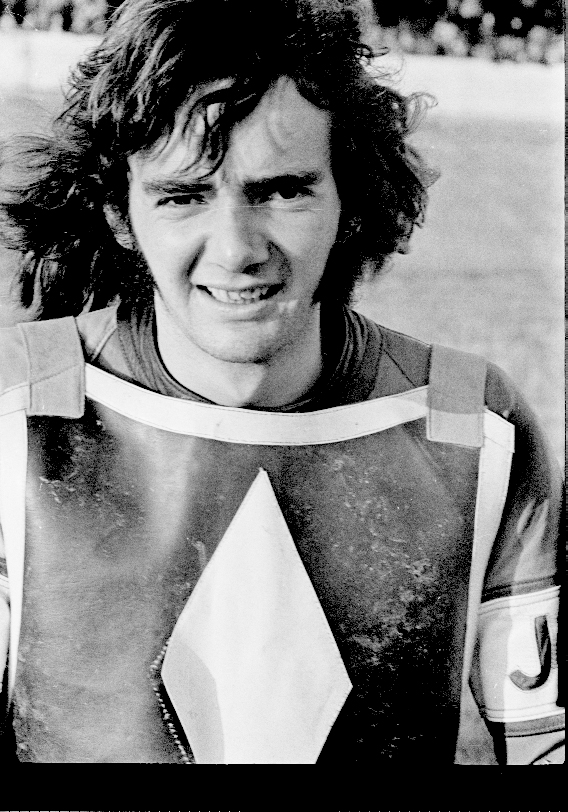
- Born: 7 December 1955 (age 70); Cessnock, New South Wales, Australia
- Nationality: Australian

Career history
- 1975–1982: Newcastle Diamonds
- 1978–1980: Hull Vikings

Team honours
- 1976: League champion (tier 2)
- 1976: Knockout Cup (tier 2)

Robert Blackadder (born 7 December 1955) is an Australian former motorcycle speedway rider. He earned four international caps for the Australia national speedway team.

== Biography ==
Blackadder, born in Cessnock, New South Wales, began his British leagues career riding for Newcastle Diamonds during the 1975 New National League season. Newcastle had been re-formed by Ian Thomas and the club signed a new team ready for 1975, which included the Owen brothers (Joe and Tom Owen), in addition to the two Australian riders, Blackadder (aged 19) and Ron Henderson (aged 17).

Blackadder made an immediate impact, supporting the Owen brothers and helping the Diamonds to the runner-up position behind Birmingham Brummies. The following season in 1976, the Newcastle team dominated and won the league and cup double and the fours. Blackadder improved his average to 8.61 and was later called up to represent the Australian speedway team.

The 1978 season resulted in further improvement with Blackadder peaking at a season average of 9.10. He became the captain of Newcastle and continued to ride for Newcastle until the early part of the 1982 season, which came to a premature end for him following a compound fracture of his left wrist after a crash in March 1982. After the Speedway Control Board introduced new points restrictions to the team building for 1983 season, Blackadder was released by Newcastle and he returned home to Australia.

Blackadder also rode a few matches for other clubs in division 1 such as Hull Vikings.
