= George Štancl =

Czech speedway rider

- Born: 19 August 1975 (age 51); Prague, Czechoslovakia
- Nationality: Czech

Career history

Czech Republic

Great Britain
- 1994–1995: Sheffield Tigers
- 1996–1999: Wolverhampton Wolves
- 2000: Coventry Bees
- 2002–2005, 2006–2007: Glasgow Tigers
- 2005: Ipswich Witches
- 2006, 2008: Newcastle Diamonds
- 2007: Edinburgh Monarchs

Poland
- 1993–1994: Gdańsk
- 1999: Bydgoszcz

Sweden
- 1999-2001: Bysarna
- 2000: Indianerna
- 2003: Rospiggarna

Individual honours
- 1993: Czech Under-21 Champion

Team honours
- 1996: Premier League Champion
- 1996: Premier League KO Cup winner
- 1994: Czech League Champion
- 2001: German League Champion
- 1993: Polish Liga II Champion
- 2000: Allsvenskan Champion
- 1993: Czech Pairs winner
- 2005: Premier League Pairs Champion

Jiří Štancl Junior, also known as George Štancl (born 19 August 1975), is a Czech former international speedway rider.

== Career ==
Štancl began his British leagues career with Sheffield Tigers in the 1994 British League Division Two season. In 1996, he signed for Wolverhampton Wolves.

Štancl reached three consecutive World Under 21 finals from 1994 to 1996.

Štancl rode the majority of his career in the British leagues riding for Sheffield, Wolverhampton, Coventry, Glasgow, Ipswich, Newcastle and Edinburgh.

Štancl also appeared three times in the Team Speedway Polish Championship.

In 2005, Štancl won the Premier League Pairs Championship partnering Shane Parker for Glasgow Tigers, during the 2005 Premier League speedway season.

== Family ==
Štancl's father Jiří is a former World Championship finalist and his grandfather, also called Jiří was a former rider.
