= Newcastle Diamonds =

Defunct motorcycle speedway team in England

Club information
- Track address: Newcastle Stadium; Fossway; Byker; Newcastle upon Tyne; NE6 2XJ
- Country: England
- Founded: 1929
- Closed: 2022
- League: SGB Championship (2022)

Club facts
- Colours: Black & White
- Track size: 300 metres (330 yd)
- Track record time: 61.0 seconds
- Track record date: 24 October 2010
- Track record holder: Kenni Larsen

Major team honours
Provincial/National/Premier League (tier 2) champions	1964, 1976, 1982, 1983, 2001
Knockout Cup (tier 2)	1976, 1982, 2010, 2012
Premier Trophy Winners	2010
Premier League Playoff Winners	2010
Premier Shield Winners	2011
Supernational Winners	1982, 1983
Gold Cup Winners	1991, 1992
National League Fours	1976, 1982, 1983
New National League Best Pairs Winners	1975
Northern Cup	1938
English Speedway Trophy	1939

Newcastle Diamonds were a motorcycle speedway team that raced in the British speedway leagues from 1929 to 2022. They were based at Newcastle Stadium on the Fossway, Byker. The Stadium was previously known as Brough Park.

== History ==
=== Origins and 1930s ===
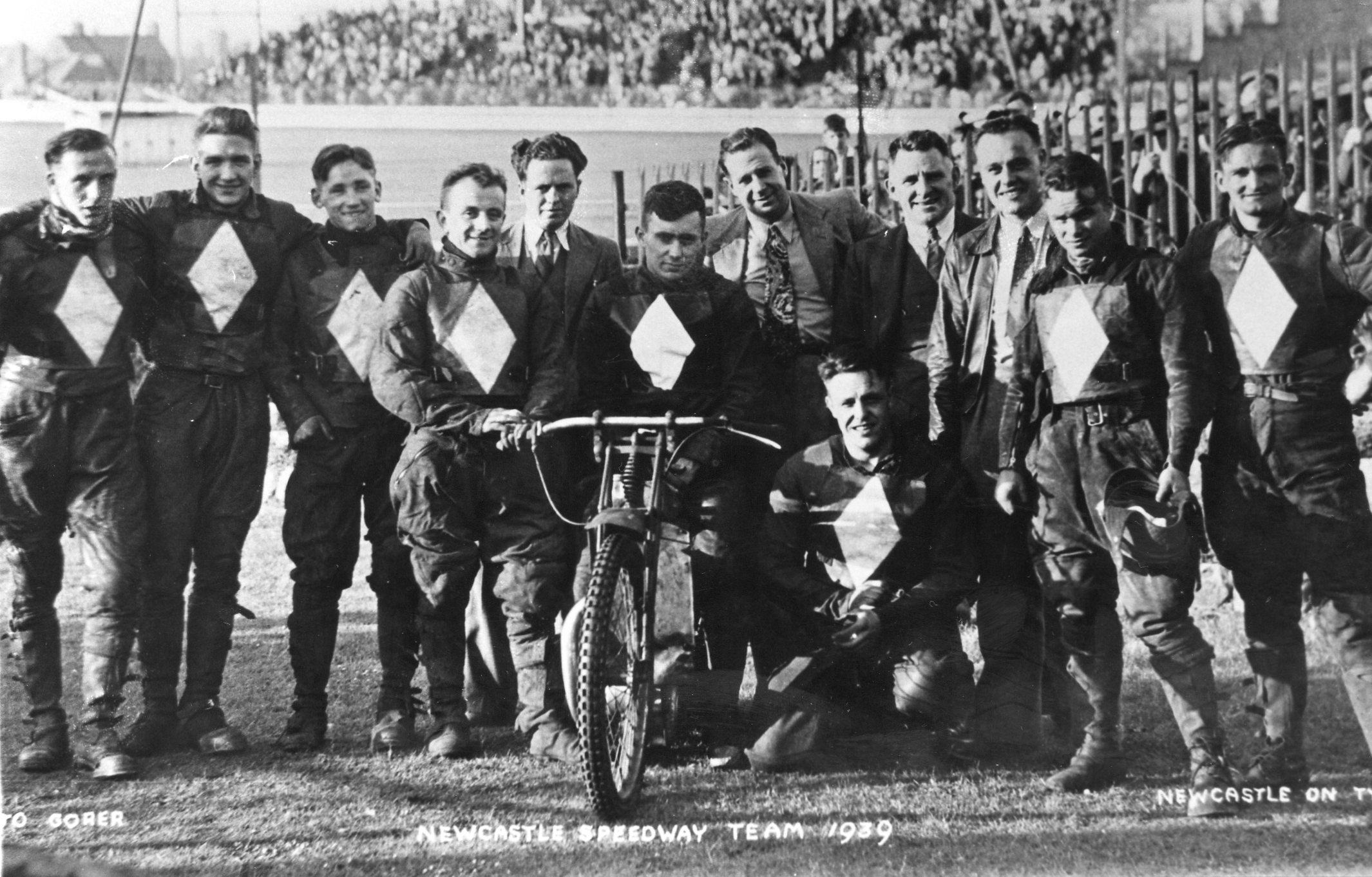
The Diamonds in the 1930s

The construction of a speedway track at Brough Park began in early 1929, under the supervision of Lindon Travers. The Newcastle team were inaugural members of the 1929 Speedway English Dirt Track League and following an open meeting on 17 May, the first league home fixture was held three days later on 20 May against Halifax Speedway. The team finished in fourth place during their debut season.

In 1930, both Brough Park and Gosforth speedway (the latter promoted by Tyneside Speedways Ltd) intended to compete in the Northern League but Gosforth signed the majority of Brough Park's riders and then Brough Park speedway closed. The team competed at the Gosforth Greyhound Stadium during 1930 but then Gosforth closed to speedway after the season and the city of Newcastle would not see a return of speedway until 1938, when they joined the National League.

The team in 1938 was coached by former rider Gordon Byers and consisted of four Canadians, a season that saw the Diamonds nickname first used. The outbreak of World War II ruined a potential league winning season in 1939.

=== 1940s ===
After the war, the team raced as Newcastle Brough in 1946 before Jeff Lloyd topped the league averages in 1947 for the Diamonds. The Diamonds promotion moved the team to Saracen Park after the 1948 season to become Ashfield Giants but a new promotion formed the Newcastle Magpies from the disbanded Middlesbrough Bears.

=== 1950s ===
After finishing last during the 1951 Speedway National League Division Two season, the promoter J. S. Smith pulled out and team disbanded and did not race in the league for the remainder of the decade.

=== 1960s ===
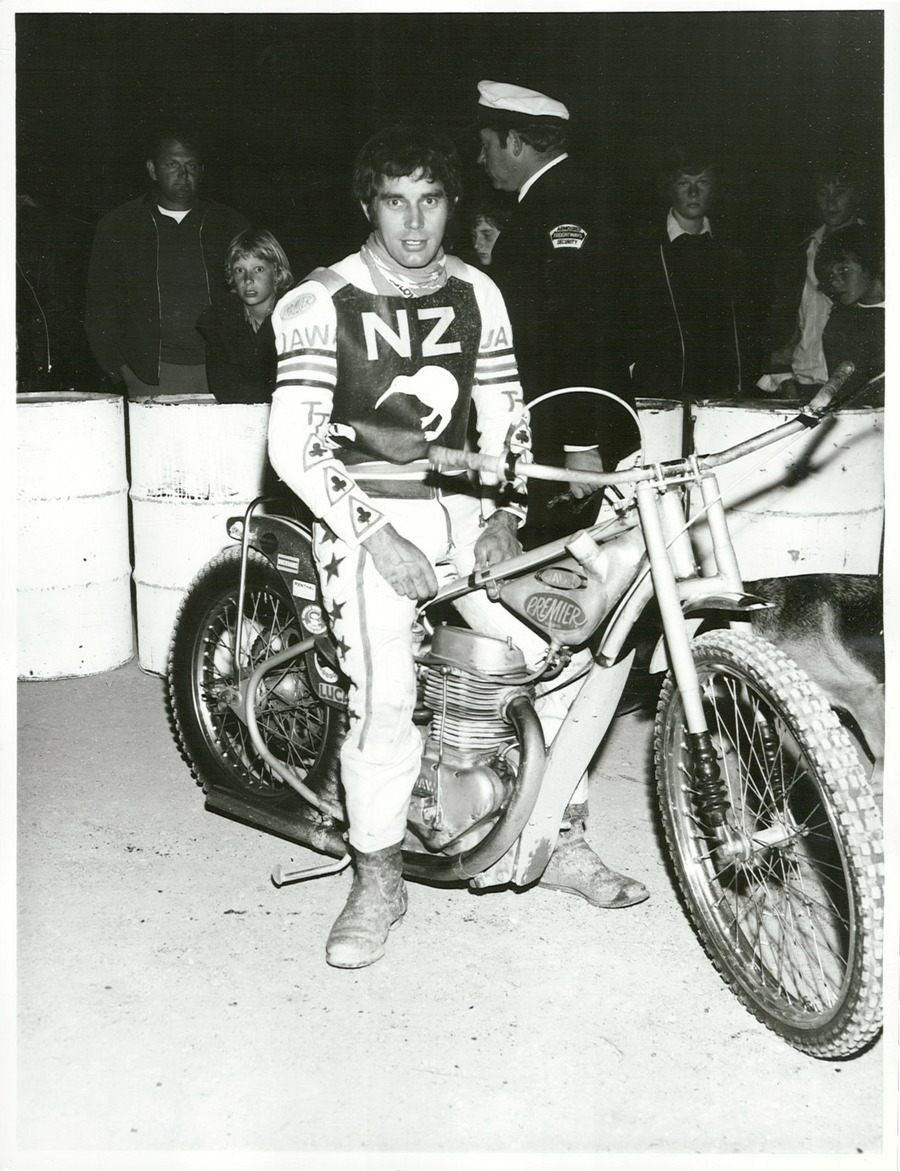
Ivan Mauger

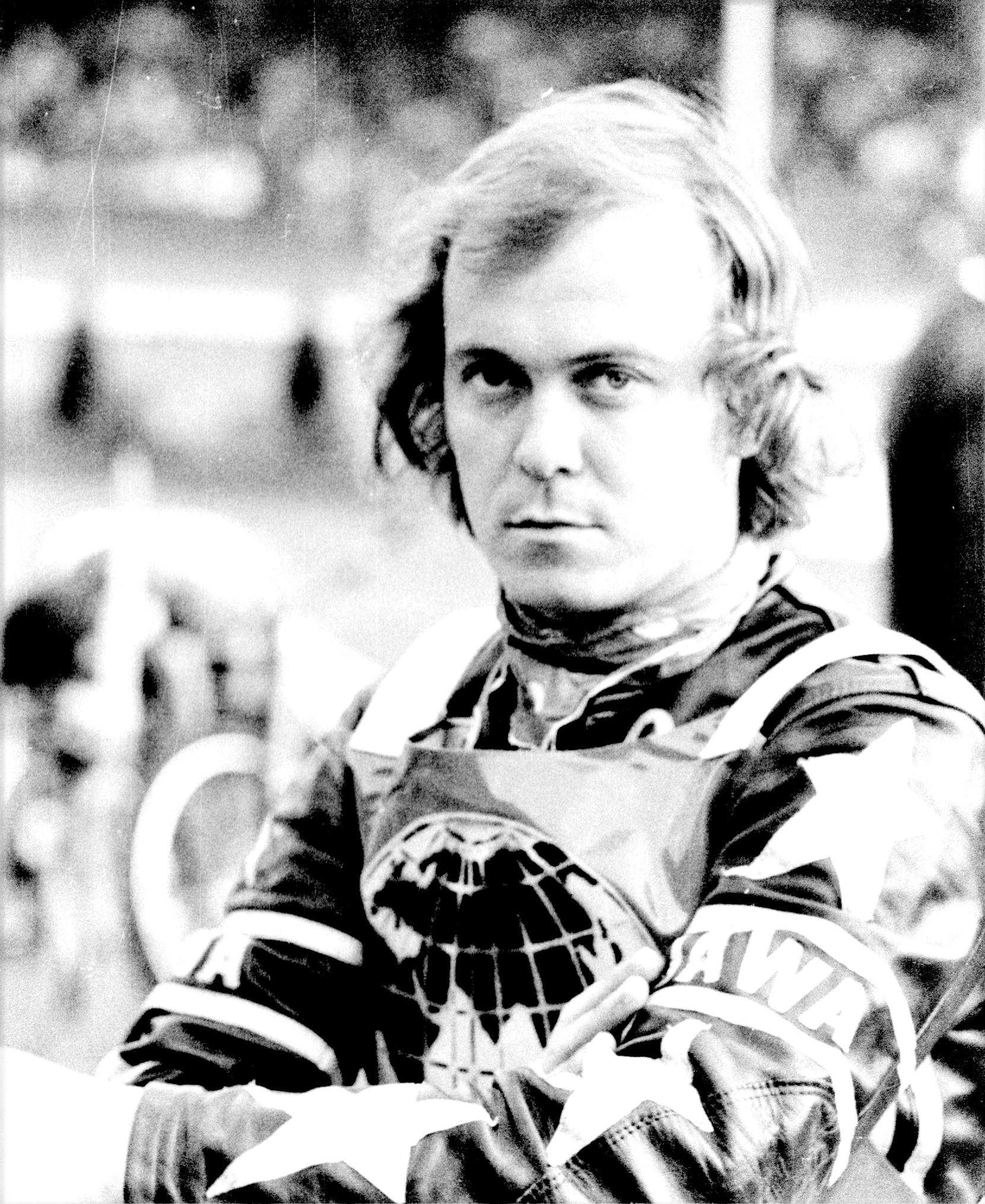
Ole Olsen

Newcastle returned in 1961 competing in the Provincial League and gradually progressed from 1961 to 1963. In 1963, the team signed New Zealander Ivan Mauger, who would go on to become six times World Champion. Under Mauger's leadership the Diamonds thrived, winning the club's first major trophy by sealing the 1964 league title. In 1965, the team were founder members of the British League.

In 1967, 21-year-old Ole Olsen made his British debut for Newcastle and would later be a three times World Champion. Olsen arrived after Mauger persuaded the promoter Mike Parker to sign him.

The 1967 and 1968 seasons were one of the rare occurrences where two of the greatest riders of all-time rode for the same team, although Olsen was in his early part of his career at the time.

=== 1970s ===
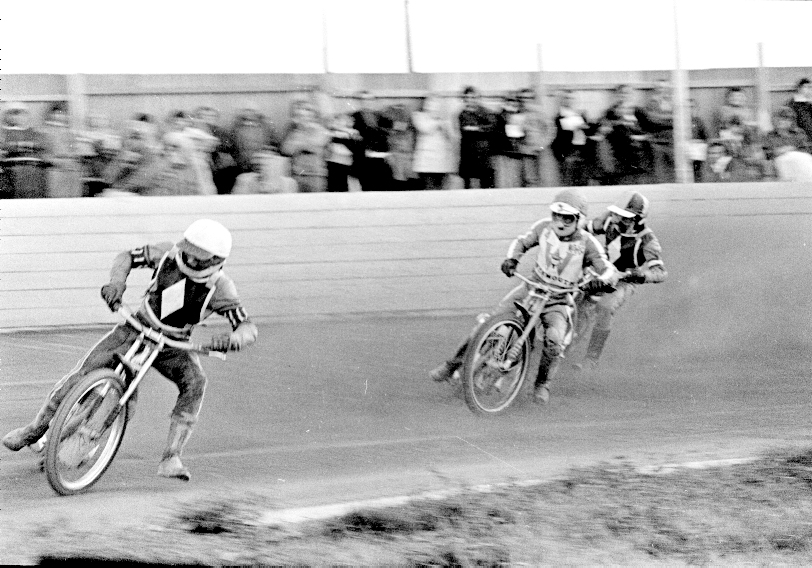
1975 National League match

After competing in the British League from 1965 to 1970 the team's first division licence was transferred by Allied Presentations to Reading Racers leaving the Newcastle promoter Ian Hoskins without a league to race in. The Diamonds missed four seasons (1971–1974) but in November 1974, Ian Thomas bought the defunct Sunderland Gladiators licence and transferred it to re-form the Diamonds, entering the team to race in the 1975 New National League season. Brian Havelock and Tom Owen won the National League Pairs, held at Hyde Road on 17 May.

The following season they won the double of National League title and Knockout Cup, in addition to winning the fours. The 1976 team was Tom Owen, Brian Havelock, Ron Henderson, Joe Owen, Andy Cusworth, Phil Michelides and Robbie Blackadder. Tom Owen then topped the averages for three consecutive years in 1977, 1978 and 1979 becoming arguably the National League's leading rider during the period.

=== 1980s ===
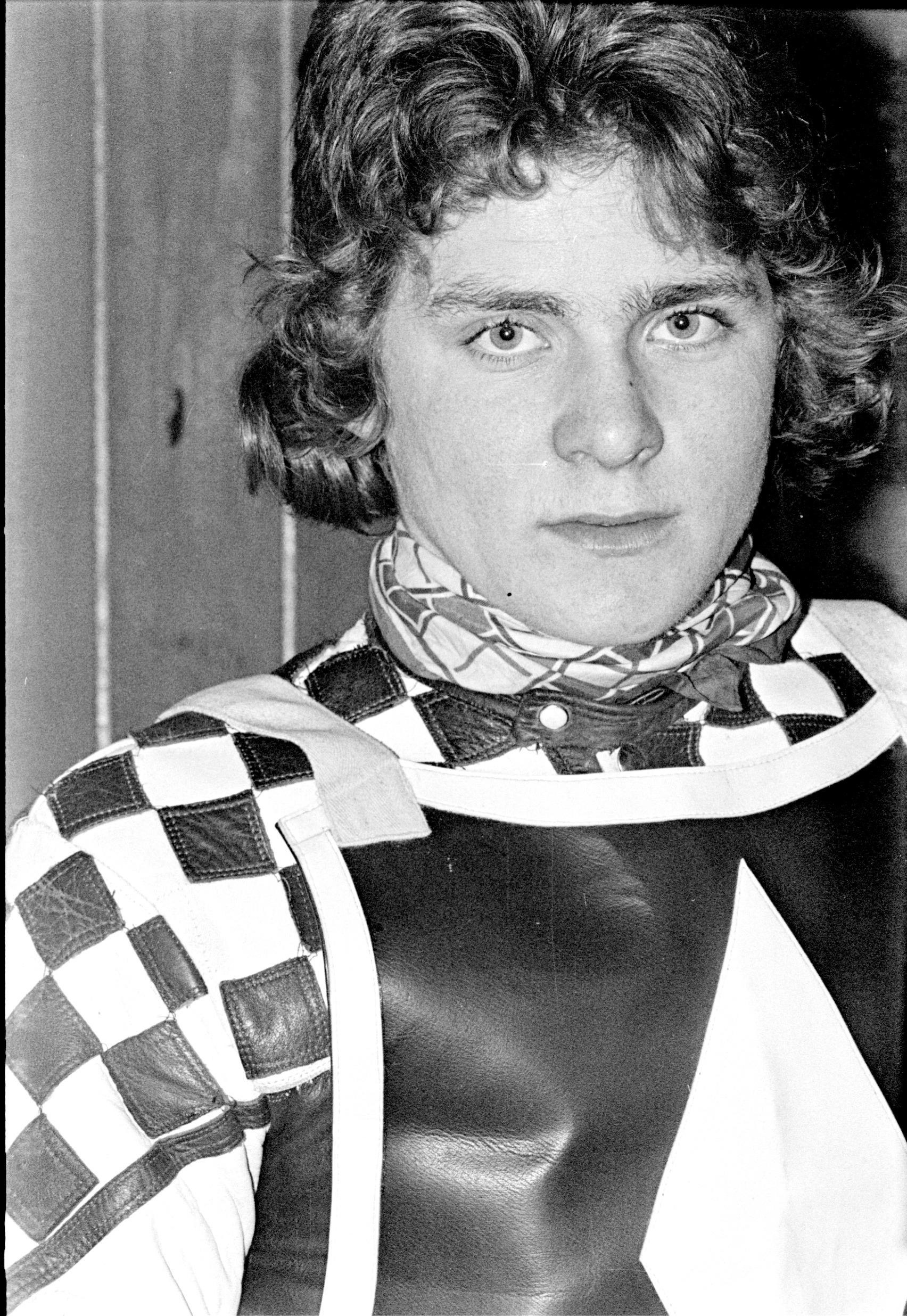
Joe Owen

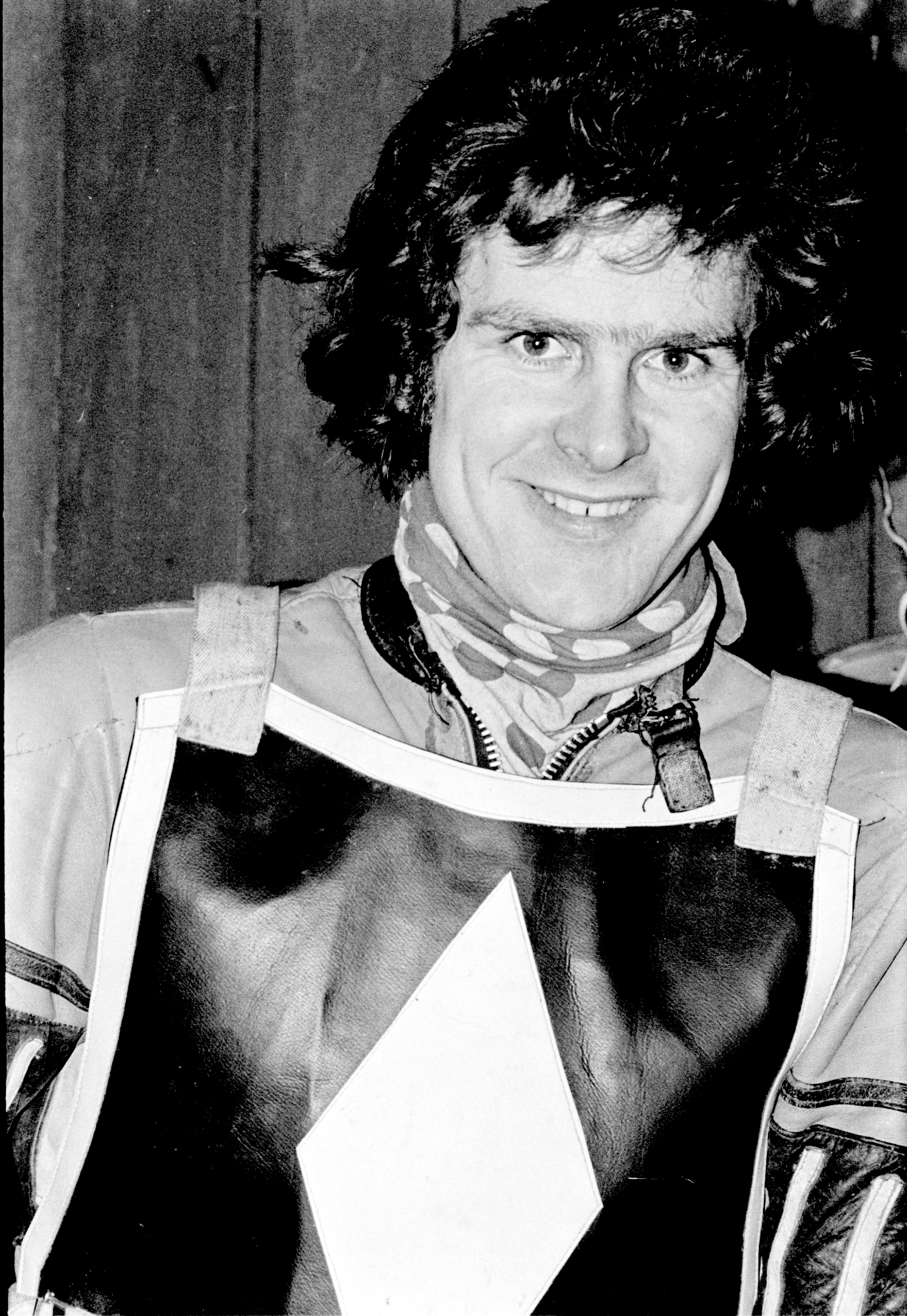
Tom Owen

Another treble of league, cup and fours came their way during the 1982 National League season, when led by Joe Owen, Rod Hunter and Bobby Beaton. One year later, led by the same three riders they won their third National League title and the Fours title during the 1983 National League season. The Diamonds moved up a division to compete in the British League during 1984 but due to financial issues, the promoters Ian Thomas and Robin Stannard did not enter a team for 1985.

After missing 1985 they were brought back by Stannard and renamed the Newcastle Federation Specials for the 1986 National League season. After just two seasons they were once again disbanded for the 1988 season before returning in 1989.

=== 1990s ===
David Bargh was re-signed in 1990 and helped the Diamonds finish third in 1991. The 1992 season was overshadowed by the death of Wayne Garratt after crashing at the track.

Following the merger of the divisions in 1995 and 1996, the Diamonds chose not to compete due to the expected increase in operational costs and the Diamonds' riders were put on the transfer list. The team returned when the league split again in 1997. The 1990s was a fractured existence for the club but the Diamonds did finish the decade with three full seasons of speedway.

=== 2000s ===
Team changes for 2000 saw the signings of Bjarne Pedersen and Andre Compton and together with Jesper Olsen they steered Newcastle to their first league title for 18 years. Winning the 2001 Premier League was the Diamonds fifth league title in total.

A second successive league title in 2002 was denied by Sheffield Tigers on points difference. Czech rider Josef Franc topped the Diamonds averages from 2006 to 2008.

=== 2010s ===
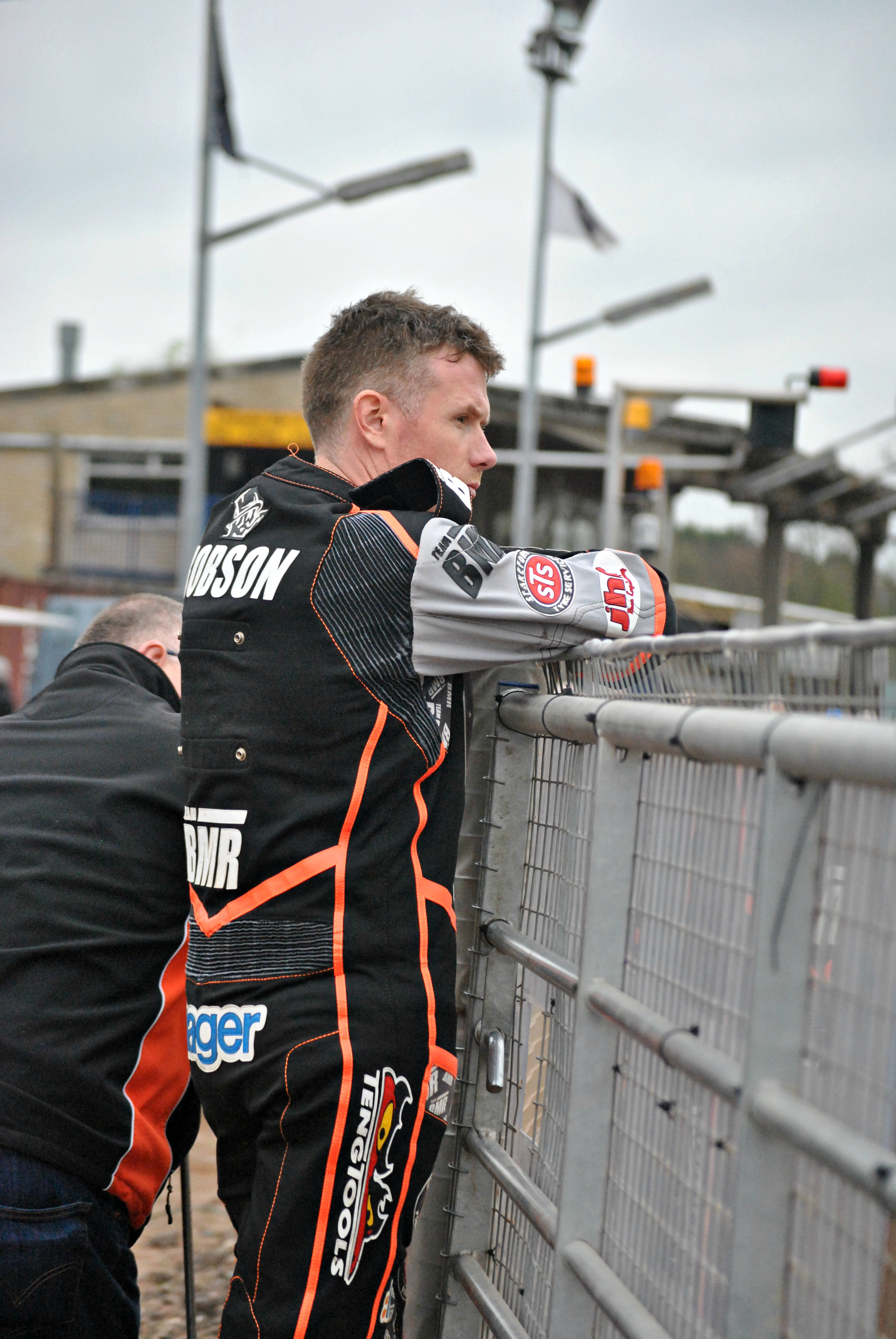
Stuart Robson spent nine seasons with the club

The 2010 season was a very successful campaign for the Diamonds. Although the Edinburgh Monarchs dominated the League, it was the Diamonds that took most silverware of the season by winning the Premier League play-offs, the Premier Trophy and the Premier League KOC (against Edinburgh Monarchs). The Diamonds also found success when the Dane Kenni Larsen won the Premier League Riders' Championship to add a fourth honour to the club's successful season. In recognition of their achievements the team was awarded the prestigious 'Team of the Year' award by Sports North-East, shortly before the 2011 campaign commenced, ahead of the Championship League winning football side Newcastle United.

Despite winning the season opening Premier Shield, the team struggled in 2011 but bounced back strongly winning the Knockout Cup for the fourth time in 2012. Steve Worrall was the Diamonds leading rider for several seasons until Robert Lambert took over as the number 1 rider in 2016, both experienced success with the Great Britain national speedway team. The Premier League became the Championship in 2017, with the Diamonds finishing 7th.

On 16 September 2018, Newcastle Diamonds legend Stuart Robson announced his retirement from the sport. He first rode for the Diamonds at the age of 16 in 1993. Newcastle Diamonds' celebrated their 90th anniversary season in 2019. After the 2019 season Rob Grant and former Stoke Potters promoter Dave Tattum took ownership of the club.

=== 2020s ===
After the leagues were cancelled in 2020 due to the COVID-19 pandemic, the team club came close to closing in 2021 before ultimately committing to the SGB Championship 2021, under Grant's ownership. Going into 2022, speedway clubs in the UK were challenged by the impacts of Brexit and European rider availability. Grant cited a rider shortage and low crowd numbers as reasons for temporarily closing the club in June 2022, with the goal of maintaining the club's financial resources to resume in 2023. Grant also cited his other business ventures, finances, and mental health as reasons to close the club before the completion of the league season. Speedway promoter and BSP Chairman Rob Godfrey stated that "[w]e had been working with the Newcastle promotion in an attempt to get them to the end of the season...but sadly that’s proved not to be the case."

== Season summary ==
Extended content

Year and league	Position	Notes
1929 Speedway English Dirt Track League	4th	
1930 Speedway Northern League	9th	
1938 Speedway National League Division Two	6th	
1939 Speedway National League Division Two	1st+	+when league was suspended
1946 Speedway Northern League	5th	
1947 Speedway National League Division Two	5th	
1948 Speedway National League Division Two	7th	
1949 Speedway National League Division Two	10th	
1950 Speedway National League Division Two	13th	
1951 Speedway National League Division Two	16th	
1961 Provincial Speedway League	11th	
1962 Provincial Speedway League	9th	
1963 Provincial Speedway League	6th	
1964 Provincial Speedway League	1st	champions
1965 British League season	12th	
1966 British League season	5th	
1967 British League season	10th	
1968 British League season	5th	
1969 British League season	13th	
1970 British League season	17th	
1975 New National League season	2nd	pairs
1976 National League season	1st	champions & Knockout Cup winners
1977 National League season	6th	
1978 National League season	2nd	
1979 National League season	6th	
1980 National League season	2nd	
1981 National League season	3rd	
1982 National League season	1st	champions & Knockout Cup winners
1983 National League season	1st	champions
1984 British League season	16th	
1986 National League season	19th	
1987 National League season	11th	
1989 National League season	15th	
1990 National League season	12th	
1991 British League Division Two season	3rd	
1992 British League Division Two season	4th	
1993 British League Division Two season	6th	
1994 British League Division Two season	7th	
1997 Premier League speedway season	4th	
1998 Premier League speedway season	10th	
1999 Premier League speedway season	5th	
2000 Premier League speedway season	8th	
2001 Premier League speedway season	1st	champions
2002 Premier League speedway season	2nd	
2003 Premier League speedway season	11th	
2004 Premier League speedway season	15th	
2005 Premier League speedway season	8th	
2006 Premier League speedway season	9th	
2007 Premier League speedway season	10th	
2008 Premier League speedway season	14th	
2009 Premier League speedway season	3rd	
2010 Premier League speedway season	2nd	PO Champions & Knockout Cup
2011 Premier League speedway season	12th	
2012 Premier League speedway season	1st	PO elimination & Knockout Cup
2013 Premier League speedway season	3rd	
2014 Premier League speedway season	8th	
2015 Premier League speedway season	9th	
2016 Premier League speedway season	3rd	
SGB Championship 2017	7th	
SGB Championship 2018	8th	
SGB Championship 2019	10th	
SGB Championship 2021	11th	
SGB Championship 2022	N/A	withdrew, results expunged

== Season summary (juniors) ==
Extended content

Year and league	Position	Notes
2002 Speedway Conference League	8th	Gems
2003 Speedway Conference League	7th	Gems
2004 Speedway Conference League	11th	Gems
2021 National Development League speedway season	N/A	withdrew, results expunged

== Previous season summaries 2006 to 2022 ==
Extended content

2006 season

Team

- (Czech Republic) George Stancl
- (Austria) Manuel Hauzinger
- (Australia) Christian Henry
- (Czech Republic) Josef Franc
- (Scotland) James Grieves
- (Scotland) Adam McKinna
- (England) Jamie Robertson

^{‡} Released.
^{†} Injured.

2007 season

Team

- (Australia) Christian Henry
- (Denmark) Jonas Raun
- (Czech Republic) Josef Franc
- (England) Paul Clews
- (England) Carl Wilkinson
- (Scotland) Adam McKinna
- (Scotland) Sean Stoddart

Also Rode:

- (Scotland) Ross Brady^{‡}

2008 season

Team

- (Czech Republic) Josef Franc
- (Scotland) Sean Stoddart
- (England) Jason King
- (Denmark) Kenni Larsen
- (Australia) Christian Henry
- (England) Jerran Hart
- (Denmark) Richard Juul

Also Rode:

- (England) Jamie Robertson^{‡}
- (Czech Republic) Matyas Hlavacek^{‡}
- (Australia) Ben Powell^{‡}
- (Czech Republic) George Štancl^{†}

2009 season

2009 team and statistics

- (Denmark) Kenni Larsen
- (Scotland) Derek Sneddon
- (England) Jason King
- (Denmark) Rene Bach
- (Australia) Mark Lemon
- (Scotland) Adam McKinna
- (Australia) Trent Leverington

Also rode:

- (Denmark) Casper Wortmann (Released)
- (England) Steve Boxall (Released)
- (England) Craig Branney (Released)

80th anniversary series In 2009 to commemorate the Diamonds 80th anniversary a series of 50 cigarette cards were produced by the club. Riders included:

- (New Zealand) Ivan Mauger
- (Denmark) Ole Olsen
- (Denmark) Nicki Pedersen
- (Denmark) Bjarne Pedersen
- (Denmark) Kenneth Bjerre
- (Sweden) Anders Michanek
- (Norway) Dag Lovaas
- (England) Joe Owen
- (England) Tom Owen
- (England) Kenny Carter
- (Australia) Ken Le Breton
- (England) Frank Hodgson
- (England) Alec Grant
- (England) Derrick Close

2010 season

Season overview: triple champions Performance in national competitions

Competition	Result	Notes
Premier League	Runners Up	Finished second on 58 points. Won away at Glasgow (37-53), Newport (44-46), Redcar (40-50), Sheffield (43-47), Somerset (42-48), Stoke (42-48). Picked up one point from King's Lynn (51-45) and Workington (47-43). Won all home matches apart from Edinburgh, which they lost by 41-51.
Premier Trophy	Champions	Only lost one match in the entire competition - Glasgow at home (43-47). Unbeaten away. Finished top of the Northern Group on 20 points. Defeated King's Lynn Stars 103-81 in the semi-final, and the Birmingham Brummies 104-80 in the Final to win the trophy.
Knockout Cup	Champions	Beat Scunthorpe 100-80 in Round 1, Redcar 100-80 in the quarter-finals, Birmingham 96-85 in the semi-finals, and Edinburgh 91-88 in the Final.
Premier League Playoffs	Champions	Defeated Birmingham 92-90 in the semi-finals, and Sheffield 101-89 in the Final. Went on to lose to the Ipswich Witches in the promotion / relegation battle 110-76.
Premier League Riders Championship	Champions	Represented by Kenni Larsen and Rene Bach who was awarded a wildcard spot for been the highest averaged rider, after all clubs were allocated one place. Larsen won the competition with a total of 16 points, and Bach finished 4th with 13. Scorers: Larsen (3, 3, 3, 2, 2, 3), Bach (3, 3, 3, 3, 1, 0 ).
Premier League Pairs	Quarter-finalists	Represented by Mark Lemon and Kenni Larsen. Eliminated on 20 points, the same as Somerset who advanced to the semi-final, as they had previously won the Somerset vs Newcastle Heat 6-3. Scorers: Larsen (4, EF, 3, 3), Lemon (3, 3, 0, 4).
Premier League Fours	Semi-finalists	Represented by Mark Lemon, Kenni Larsen, Rene Bach, Jason King, and reserve Dakota North. Finished third in Group A. Scorers: Larsen (3, 1) Lemon (3, 3) Bach (EF, EF) King (1, 1) North (DNR).

2010 team and statistics Greensheet averages The following averages take into account league and trophy matches only, excluding playoffs, semi-finals, and finals. These averages are used for team building purposes and riding order.

Rider	M	H	A	R	P	2009	2010	+/-
(Denmark) Kenni Larsen	28	15	13	129	312	8.10	9.67	+1.57
(Scotland) Derek Sneddon	34	17	17	142	187	4.95	5.27	+0.28
(England) Jason King	29	13	16	122	177	7.08	5.80	-1.28
(Denmark) Rene Bach	30	16	14	144	325	7.02	9.03	+2.01
(Australia) Mark Lemon	33	17	16	159	357	8.09	8.98	+0.89
(Scotland) Adam McKinna	21	11	10	80	50	3.37	3.00	-0.37
(Australia) Dakota North	32	17	15	159	185	3.00	4.65	+1.65
Also Rode
(Denmark) Anders Andersen ^{‡}	27	12	15	123	72	3.00	3.00	-

Note: British riders have 2.5% reduction on their 2010 averages.
Also Rode: ^{‡} Released., Injured.

All match averages The following averages take into account all matches including Knockout Cup and Playoffs.

Rider		M	R	PTS	BP	TOT	CMA
(Denmark) Kenni Larsen	H	24	115	300	10	310	10.78
	A	22	101	223	7	230	9.11
		46	216	523	17	540	10.00
(Scotland) Derek Sneddon	H	26	112	158	33	191	6.82
	A	25	108	103	18	121	4.48
		51	220	261	51	312	5.67
(England) Jason King	H	17	73	130	22	152	8.33
	A	20	83	98	12	110	5.30
		37	156	228	34	262	6.72
(Denmark) Rene Bach	H	25	117	282	21	303	10.36
	A	22	105	212	8	220	8.38
		47	222	494	29	523	9.42
(Australia) Mark Lemon	H	23	111	282	15	297	10.70
	A	23	110	213	8	221	8.04
		46	221	495	23	518	9.38
(Australia) Dakota North	H	23	111	155	23	178	6.41
	A	22	114	114	12	126	4.42
		45	225	269	35	304	5.40
(Scotland) Adam McKinna	H	17	76	59	14	73	3.84
	A	16	64	32	10	42	2.63
		38	140	91	24	115	3.29
Also Rode
(Denmark) Anders Andersen	H	7	30	21	3	24	3.20
	A	8	33	13	3	16	1.94
		15	63	34	6	40	2.54

Number of maximums

Rider	H/F	H/P	A/F	A/P	TOT	Near Maxima
(Denmark) Kenni Larsen	8	4	2		14	6 (3H, 3A)
(Scotland) Derek Sneddon		1			1	0
(England) Jason King		1			1	0
(Denmark) Rene Bach	2	6			8	3 (3H)
(Australia) Mark Lemon	2	2	3	1	8	16 (14H, 2A)
(Scotland) Adam McKinna					0	0
(Australia) Dakota North		1			1	0
Also Rode
(Denmark) Anders Andersen					0	0

H/F: Full Home, H/P Paid Home, A/F Full Away, P/A Paid Away. Near Maximum: When the rider only dropped a single point from their rides.

Fastest times The following are the riders fastest times around the Brough Park track.

Rider	T	Date
(Denmark) Kenni Larsen	61.0	24/10/10
(Scotland) Derek Sneddon	63.5	22/08/10
(England) Jason King	62.9	05/04/10
(Denmark) Rene Bach	61.9	24/10/10
(Australia) Mark Lemon	62.5	13/06/10
(Scotland) Adam McKinna	66.3	21/03/10
(Australia) Dakota North	63.7	30/08/10
Also Rode
(Denmark) Anders Andersen	65.1	20/06/10
Fastest Visitor
(Scotland) Andrew Tully	61.5	08/08/10

Note: Kenni Larsen set the current track record as 61.0 on 24/10/10.

2011 season

Season overview

Performance in national competitions

Competition	Result	Notes
Premier League	12th	46 points.
Knockout Cup	Semi-finalists	Beat Rye House (89-77) in Round 1. Beat Somerset (97-83) in Quarter-final. Lost to Glasgow (93-87) in the semi-final.
Premier Shield	Champions	Inaugural champions, defeating the previous seasons league winners, Edinburgh Monarchs 94-89 on aggregate.
Premier League Riders Championship	11th	Represented by Mark Lemon (1, 1, 0, 2, 1) = 5.
Premier League Pairs	Quarter-finalists	Represented by Derek Sneddon (for Mark Lemon) and Stuart Robson. Eliminated on 17 points, finished 3rd in Group A. Scorers: Sneddon (3, 0, 0, 0), Robson (2, 4, 4, 4).
Premier League Fours	Qualified / Withdrew	Qualified for the competition, however had to withdraw due to rider injuries.

2011 team and statistics

Rider	M	H	A	R	P	2011	2010	+/-
(Australia) Mark Lemon						9.18		
(Scotland) Derek Sneddon						5.47		
(England) Joe Haines						5.30		
(Denmark) Rene Bach						8.75		
(Denmark) Claes Nedermark						6.26		
(England) Kyle Newman						4.02		
(England) Richie Worrall						3.22		
Also Rode
(England) Stuart Robson						8.85		
(England) Jason King						5.07		
(Slovenia) Matej Ferjan †						7.00		
(Czech Republic) Lubos Tomicek ^{‡}						4.70		

Note: British riders have 2.5% reduction on their 2010 averages.
Also Rode: ^{‡} Released., Injured., ^{†} Ferjan died on 22 May 2011.

2011 fixtures / results

Date	Match	Comp	Res.	P	Top Scorer	Notes / Guests / Injuries
Team Change: Signed Lubos Tomicek for King
19 March	Berwick Bandits vs Newcastle Diamonds	TTW	43-50	-	M. Lemon 15 (5)	
20 March	Newcastle Diamonds vs Berwick Bandits	TTW	49-44	-	M. Lemon 14 (5)	Won Tyne/Tweed Trophy, Agg. 94-92
25 March	Edinburgh Monarchs vs Newcastle Diamonds	PS	44-46	-	S. Robson 13 (5)	
27 March	Newcastle Diamonds vs Redcar Bears	CHAL	45-44	-	S. Robson 13+1 (5)	
1 Apr	Scunthorpe Scorpions vs Newcastle Diamonds	PL	47-42	1	M. Lemon 12 (5); S. Robson 11+1 (5)	
2 April	Rye House Rockets vs Newcastle Diamonds	PL	44-46	3	M. Lemon 12 (5)	
3 April	Newcastle Diamonds vs Edinburgh Monarchs	PS	48-45	-	S. Robson 14 (5)	Won Premier Shield, Agg. 94-89.
10 April	Newcastle Diamonds vs Rye House Rockets	PL	50-43	3	M. Lemon 13 (5)	Bach Broken tibia and fibula in right leg, possible further injuries to ribs and collarbone. Newman Wrist.
14 April	Redcar Bears vs Newcastle Diamonds	CHAL	57-33	-	M. Lemon 13 (6)	r/r for Bach returned 6 points. Adam McKinna for Newman - 1 point.
16 April	Leicester Lions v Newcastle Diamonds	PL	52-43	0	S. Robson 12+1 (5)	Kevin Doolan for Bach - 11 points.
17 April	Newcastle Diamonds v Leicester Lions	PL	50-40	3	M. Lemon 15 (5)	Andrew Tully for Bach - 6+3 points. Adam McKinna for Newman (World U21s) - 1+1 points.
Team Change: Matej Ferjan for Bach. Team Change: Claes Nedermark for Tomicek (released).
24 April	Glasgow Tigers v Newcastle Diamonds	PL	50-43	0	M. Lemon 14 (5)	Worrall. Withdrew after 1 ride.
25 April	Newcastle Diamonds v Glasgow Tigers	PL	41-49	0	R. Worrall 10+4 (7)	Lemon. Double break in collarbone.
29 April	Somerset Rebels v Newcastle Diamonds	PL	53-43	0	S. Robson 11+2 (5)	Sergey Darkin for Lemon - 6+1 points.
1 May	Newcastle Diamonds v Sheffield Tigers	PL	49-44	2	S. Robson 18 (5)	Kevin Doolan for Lemon - 9+1 points.
14 May	Rye House Rockets v Newcastle Diamonds	PLKOC	39-39	-	S. Robson 11 (4)	Leigh Lanham for Lemon - 9 points. Ferjan r/r (Hungarian Championship) - 4 points. Abandoned after Heat 13 (rain).
15 May	Newcastle Diamonds v Rye House Rockets	PLKOC	50-38	-	S. Robson 10+3 (5)	Jason Lyons for Lemon - 8+1 points.
Team Change: Jason King for Ferjan (died).
29 May	Newcastle Diamonds v Redcar Bears	PL	42-47	0	S. Robson 11 (5)	Mark Lemon returned from injury. Jason King returned for his first match since August 2010.
5 June	Newcastle Diamonds v Somerset Rebels	PL	48-45	2	S. Robson 14 (5)	
16 June	Sheffield Tigers v Newcastle Diamonds	PL	52-39	0	S. Robson 11+1 (5)	Lee Complin for Lemon - 7+1 points.
19 June	Newcastle Diamonds v Plymouth Devils	PL	52-40	3	C. Nedermark 11+2 (5)	Jason Lyons for Lemon - 6 points.
23 June	Ipswich Witches v Newcastle Diamonds	PL	47-44	1	S. Robson 17 (5)	Leigh Lanham for Lemon - 8 points.
1 July	Edinburgh Monarchs v Newcastle Diamonds	PL	53-39	0	S. Robson 13 (5)	James Grieves for Lemon - 9 points.
2 July	Workington Comets v Newcastle Diamonds	PL	51-42	0	K. Newman 17+1 (7)	Jason Lyons for Lemon - 10 points. Robson withdrew after one ride.
3 July	Newcastle Diamonds v Scunthorpe Scorpions	PL	49-45	2	C. Nedermark 14 (6)	Jason Lyons for Lemon - 12+1 points. r/r for Robson - 9 points.
7 July	Redcar Bears v Newcastle Diamonds	PL	59-34	0	D. Howe 15 (6)	David Howe for Lemon - 15 points. r/r for Robson - 10 points. King.
10 July	Newcastle Diamonds v Edinburgh Monarchs	PL	52-43	3	J. Lyons 15 (5)	Jason Lyons for Lemon - 15 points. Aaron Summers for Robson - 11+1 points. r/r for King - 7 points.
16 July	Newport Wasps v Newcastle Diamonds	PL	48-42	1	S. Robson 10+1 (5)	Cory Gathercole for Lemon - 7 points. r/r for King - 7+2 points.
22 July	Somerset Rebels v Newcastle Diamonds	PLKOC	46-44	-	K. Newman 15+2 (7)	David Howe for Lemon - 3+1 points. r/r for King - 7+2 points.
24 July	Newcastle Diamonds V Somerset Rebels	PLKOC	53-37	-	K. Newman 15+2 (7)	Jason Lyons for Lemon - 4+2 points. r/r for King - 9+2 points. Sneddon - withdrew after 2 rides.
30 July	Berwick Bandits v Newcastle Diamonds	PL	49-43	1	J. Lyons 14 (5)	Jason Lyons for Lemon - 14 points. Thomas Jorgensen for Sneddon - 2 points r/r for King - 4 points.
31 July	Newcastle Diamonds v Workington Comets	PL	54-39	3	K. Newman 12+2 (7)	Jason Lyons for Lemon - 10+1 points. Jan Graversen for Sneddon - 4+1 points r/r for King - 6 points. Robson - punctured lung and broken ribs. Nedermark - knees. Entire top five of the team injured.
Team Change: Rene Bach to return from injury Team Change: Joe Haines signed for King.

Note: Top scorer in italics, indicates a full or paid maximum.
Fixtures: TTW: Tyne/Tweed Trophy, CHAL: Challenge, PS: Premier Shield, PL: Premier League
Coloring: Green: Won, Red: Lost, Yellow: Draw, Blue: Lost, but still gained league points (PL matches only)

2018 season

Personnel

- George English, Andrew Dalby & Martin Phillips (club owners)
- George English & Martin Phillips (club promoters)
- Boiler Technical Services (team sponsor)

Performance in national competitions

Competition	Result	Notes
Tyne/Tweed Trophy	Won	Newcastle 102 Berwick 78
Championship Four Team Tournament	Out in group stage	10th in Qualifiers, 7 points
Championship Pairs	n/a	Did not qualify
Championship (League)	8th out of 11	
Championship Shield (Cup)	Out in group stage	3rd in Group 9 points from 6 meetings
Championship Knock Out Cup	Out in quarter final	
Championship Riders Championship	Out in qualifying stage	Tero Aarnio Represented Newcastle 9 Points

Team and statistics Averages below are green sheet averages based on BSPA (as at 1 October 2018):

Rider	Final 2018 Ave	Starting 2018 Average	+/-
(England) Stuart Robson	6.43	7.02	-
(Sweden) Ludvig Lindgren	6.47	7.21	-
(England) Ashley Morris	5.58	4.88	+
(Finland) Tero Aarnio	6.83	5.02	+
(Czech Republic) Matej Kus	5.63	7.64	-
(Australia) Matthew Wethers	5.78	5.65	+
(England) Carl Wilkinson	3.96	4.97	-
Also Rode			
(England) Lewis Rose	6.25	6.49	-

Form		Riders Form over their last 6 matches											
Rider		M	R	P	B	GS Ave.	CMA	Ist	2nd	3rd	4th	R	Ex.
1	Tero Aarnio	6	32	59	3	7.38	7.75	7	17	4	1	1	2
2	Stuart Robson	6	28	46	2	6.57	6.86	6	8	12	2	0	0
3	Ludvig Lindgren	6	28	41	3	5.86	6.29	8	7	3	6	4	0
4	Matej Kus	6	25	36	2	5.76	6.08	5	8	5	6	1	0
5	Matthew Wethers	6	37	52	11	5.62	6.81	7	8	15	5	1	1
6	Ashley Morris	6	29	30	7	4.14	5.10	2	6	12	6	2	1
7	Carl Wilkinson	6	31	20	4	2.58	3.10	2	2	10	10	6	1

2019 season

The full team was confirmed on 22 December 2018 with only Matthew Wethers retained from the 2018 season. Thomas Jorgensen joined the Diamonds following 2018 with neighbours and rivals Redcar Bears. Danny Phillips was on loan from the Diamonds at Scunthorpe during 2018. Max Clegg travelled south from Edinburgh Monarchs, while Steve Worrall and Simon Lambert were late additions to the team from Workington. Finally, Lasse Bjerre, younger brother of Newcastle legend Kenneth Bjerre who started his British career with the Diamonds in the early 2000s before going on to star in the Speedway Grand Prix series, was on the team.

Personnel

- George English, Andrew Dalby & Martin Phillips (club owners)
- George English & Martin Phillips (club promoters)
- Technical Services (team sponsor)

Team and statistics

- (England) Steve Worrall 7.97*
- (Denmark) Thomas Jorgensen 7.66
- (Denmark) Lasse Bjerre 7.08
- (Australia) Matthew Wethers 5.78
- (England) Simon Lambert 4.18
- (England) Max Clegg 3.17
- (England) Danny Phillips 2.00

2020 to 2022 seasons

The 2020 SGB Championship season was cancelled due to the COVID-19 pandemic. In 2020, Newcastle entered a junior team, named the Newcastle Gems to compete in the National Development League National Trophy competition.

2021

Personnel

- Robert Grant Jnr (club owner)
- Robert Grant Jnr & Dave Tattum (club promoters)
- Grant's Event Catering (team sponsor)
- 2021 team
- (England) Ben Barker 7.07
- (Australia) Matthew Wethers 7.03
- (England) Max Clegg 4.98
- (England) Connor Mountain 4.95
- (England) Adam Roynon 4.00
- (England) James Wright 4.00
- (England) Archie Freeman 1.00

2022 season

- 2022 team
- (New Zealand) Bradley Wilson-Dean 8.21
- (England) Paul Starke
- (Australia) Matthew Wethers
- (England) Max Clegg
- (England) James Wright
- (England) Kyle Bickley
- (England) Lee Complin

Also rode:

- (New Zealand) George Congreve

== Club honours ==
=== Team honours ===
19 Titles

- Provincial League Champions - 1964
- National League Champions - 1976, 1982, 1983
- Premier League Champions - 2001
- National League Knockout Cup Winners - 1976, 1982
- Premier League Knockout Cup Winners - 2010
- Premier Trophy Winners - 2010
- Premier League Playoff Winners - 2010
- Premier Shield Winners - 2011.
- Supernational Winners - 1982, 1983
- Gold Cup Winners - 1991, 1992
- National League Four-Team Championship Winners - 1976, 1982, 1983
- National League Best Pairs Winners - Tom Owen & Brian Havelock (1975)

=== Individual honours ===
- World Champions - Ivan Mauger (1968)
- National League Riders Championship - Joe Owen (1976, 1982)
- Provincial League Riders Championship - Ivan Mauger (1963, 1964)
- Premier League Riders Championship - Kenni Larsen (2010)

=== Regional honour ===
- Sport Newcastle Team of the Year - 2010

== Riders ==
=== Notable riders ===
- (New Zealand) David Bargh
- (Scotland) Bobby Beaton
- (Australia) Robbie Blackadder
- (England) Alan Emerson
- (Czech Republic) Josef Franc
- (Australia) Ron Henderson
- (Australia) Rod Hunter
- (England) Peter Kelly
- (Denmark) Kenni Larsen
- (Australia) Mark Lemon
- (England) Jeff Lloyd
- (New Zealand) Ivan Mauger
- (Denmark) Ole Olsen
- (England) Joe Owen
- (England) Tom Owen
- (Denmark) Bjarne Pedersen
- (England) Stuyart Robson
- (England) Maurice Stobbart
- (England) Roland Stobbart
- (England) Mike Watkin
- (England) Steve Worrall

=== Rider of the Year ===
As nominated by supporters:

- 2006: (Australia) Christian Henry
- 2007: (Scotland) Sean Stoddart
- 2008: (England) Jason King
- 2009: (Australia) Mark Lemon
- 2010: (Denmark) Kenni Larsen
- 2011: (England) Stuart Robson

=== Hall of fame riders/managers ===
There are currently three inductees in the Diamonds hall of fame:

- (New Zealand) Ivan Mauger
- (England) Tom Owen
- (Denmark) Kenni Larsen
