= Premier League Knockout Cup =

British motorcycle speedway competition

- Formerly: British League Division Two Knockout Cup; British League Knockout Cup (merged 1995)
- Sport: Speedway
- Founded: 1995
- Folded: 2016
- Replaced by: SGB Championship Knockout Cup
- Country: United Kingdom
- Last champion: Glasgow Tigers

The Premier League Knockout Cup was a motorcycle speedway Knockout Cup competition in the United Kingdom between 1995 and 2016, governed by the Speedway Control Bureau (SCB).

== History ==
The teams from the Premier League, the top tier of league racing between 1995 and 1996 competed in the competition before they switched to the Elite League Knockout Cup. The second-tier teams then exclusively competed in the competition from 1997 until 2016. Similar competitions were staged between teams in the two divisions of the British League. The last winners of the Knockout Cup were the Glasgow Tigers who gained a 104–76 aggregate victory over the Newcastle Diamonds over two legs. The competition was organised by the British Speedway Promoters' Association (BSPA).

== Competition format ==
The competition was run on a knockout principle; teams drawn together race home and away matches against each other, with the aggregate score deciding the result. In the event of the aggregate score being level, the teams again race home and away against each other until the tie is decided by an aggregate win. With the current 14 teams, 12 teams will be drawn into the first round, with two other teams receiving a bye into the next round. Each round is contested with a home and away leg, with the winner on aggregate qualifying for the next round.

== Winners ==
Year	Winners	Runners-up
Premier League Knockout Cup
1997	Edinburgh Monarchs	Oxford Cheetahs
1998	Reading Racers	Peterborough Panthers
1999	Edinburgh Monarchs	Arena Essex Hammers
2000	Swindon Robins	Hull Vikings
2001	Hull Vikings	Exeter Falcons
2002	Sheffield Tigers	Hull Vikings
2003	Isle of Wight Islanders	Sheffield Tigers
2004	Hull Vikings	Isle of Wight Islanders
2005	King's Lynn Stars	Rye House Rockets
2006	King's Lynn Stars	Somerset Rebels
2007	King's Lynn Stars	Somerset Rebels
2008	Somerset Rebels	Workington Comets
2009	King's Lynn Stars	Edinburgh Monarchs
2010	Newcastle Diamonds	Edinburgh Monarchs
2011	Newport Wasps	Glasgow Tigers
2012	Newcastle Diamonds	Ipswich Witches
2013	Somerset Rebels	Rye House Rockets
2014	Edinburgh Monarchs	Ipswich Witches
2015	Somerset Rebels	Edinburgh Monarchs
2016	Glasgow Tigers	Newcastle Diamonds

== Note ==
The 1995 and 1996 competition was for tier one teams following the merger of the division one and two leagues.

== See also ==
Knockout Cup (speedway) for full list of winners and competitions
