= Jason King (speedway rider) =

English speedway rider (born 1985)

- Born: 13 April 1985 (age 41); Maidstone, England
- Nickname: JK, Jay, Kingy
- Nationality: British (English)

Career history
- 2000–2003: Peterborough Pumas
- 2002: Swindon Sprockets
- 2003: Arena Essex Hammers
- 2004, 2006–2007: Mildenhall Fen Tigers
- 2004: Rye House Rockets
- 2005: Somerset Rebels
- 2005: Newport Wasps
- 2008–2011: Newcastle Diamonds
- 2012: Berwick Bandits

Team honours
- 2002: Conference League Champion
- 2004: Conference KO Cup Winner
- 2004: Conference Trophy Winner
- 2004: Conference Four-Team Champion
- 2010: Premier Trophy
- 2010: Premier League Knockout Cup
- 2010: Premier League Playoffs

Jason Gary King (born 13 April 1985 in Maidstone, England) is a former motorcycle speedway rider, from England.

== Career ==
King rode for the Arena Essex Hammers in 2003. When riding for Somerset Rebels in 2005, King qualified for the British Under-21 Championship final. In 2006, he returned to Mildenhall Fen Tigers for two seasons.

King later became the club captain of Newcastle Diamonds in the British Premier League.

== Family ==
King's brother Danny is also a speedway rider.
