= Ian Thomas (speedway promoter) =

English speedway promoter (1942–2011)

- Born: 1942; Ilkley, West Yorkshire
- Died: 16 February 2011 (aged 69)
- Occupations: Speedway promoter and team manager

Ian Thomas (1942 – 16 February 2011), was a motorcycle speedway promoter and team manager, who managed the England national speedway team during 1980.

== Biography ==
Thomas was born in Ilkley, West Yorkshire and left school aged 15. After failing to become a professional speedway rider he took up various jobs before finding his way into the promotion of speedway.

Thomas and his business partner Jeff Brownhut founded Workington Comets after a successful application was made by for a licence to race at Derwent Park for the 1970 season. The move is credited in helping the Workington Town rugby league club avert financial troubles. The rugby pitch required moving 25 yards sideways to accommodate the speedway track.

Thomas started a company called Premier Sporting Promotions and in 1971 began to bring entertainment acts such as Ken Dodd to Derwent Park. In 1971, he also brought speedway back to Hull, when the Hull Vikings began to race at the Boulevard Stadium. It was at Hull that he formed a promoting partnership with Wally Mawdsley.

In 1974, Thomas bought the defunct Sunderland Gladiators licence and transferred it to re-form the Newcastle Diamonds, entering the team to race in the 1975 New National League season.

Thomas was named the manager of the England team in December 1979, to work alongside Eric Boocock, who was named coach and technical adviser. As England team manager he saw the international success, which included winning the 1980 Speedway World Team Cup and 1980 Speedway World Pairs Championship.

His career took a dive after he incurred financial losses of £40,000 with Newcastle during the 1984 season. He was forced to sell his house before launching a new promotion company. He returned to speedway organising ice speedway with co-promoter Graham Drury at Telford before working with Tony Mole in bringing back Workington Comets to race in the 1999 Premier League. Workington experienced a golden era, winning multiple trophies from 1999 to 2010.

Thomas died from cancer in 2011.
