= Kozza Smith =

Australian motorcycle speedway rider (born 1988)

- Born: 20 March 1988 (age 38); Cessnock, New South Wales
- Nationality: Australian

Career history
- 2008–2011, 2013: King's Lynn Stars
- 2009-2010: Ipswich Witches
- 2011, 2013: Berwick Bandits
- 2015: Glasgow Tigers

Individual honours
- 2012: Australian Long Track Champion
- 2012: NSW State Champion

Kozza Smith (born Korey Williams on 20 March 1988 in Cessnock, New South Wales) is a former motorcycle speedway rider from Australia.

== Career history ==
Smith began racing at the age of 14 in Australian junior speedway and in 2006, he won the Queensland under-21 state championship.

Smith moved to the United Kingdom and joined his first senior club, King's Lynn Stars, for the 2008 Premier League season. The Stars reached the final of the Premier League play-offs but lost to the Edinburgh Monarchs. He was announced in the King's Lynn 2009 team and signed for Elite League team the Ipswich Witches as a doubling up rider with Carl Wilkinson.

In 2011, Smith doubled up in the Premier League with Berwick Bandits, going on to ride with the team for three seasons. He signed for King's Lynn and Redcar Bears for 2014, but was refused a visa to ride in the UK.

Smith won the Australian Longtrack Championship in 2012.

== World Final Appearances ==
=== Under-21 World Cup ===
- 2008 - (Denmark) Holsted - 4th - 33pts (1)

== See also ==
- Australia national speedway team
- Australia national under-21 speedway team
