= Ron Henderson (speedway rider) =

Australian motorcycle racer (born 1957)

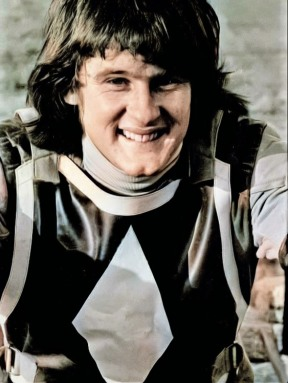
- Born: 27 February 1957 (age 69); Brisbane, Australia

Career history
- 1975-1977: Newcastle Diamonds
- 1975-1976: Hull Vikings
- 1975: Swindon Robins

Team honours
- 1976: National League Champion
- 1976: National League KO Cup Winner

Ronald Hillary Henderson (born 27 February 1957) is an Australian former motorcycle speedway rider. He earned two international caps for the Australia national speedway team.

== Career ==
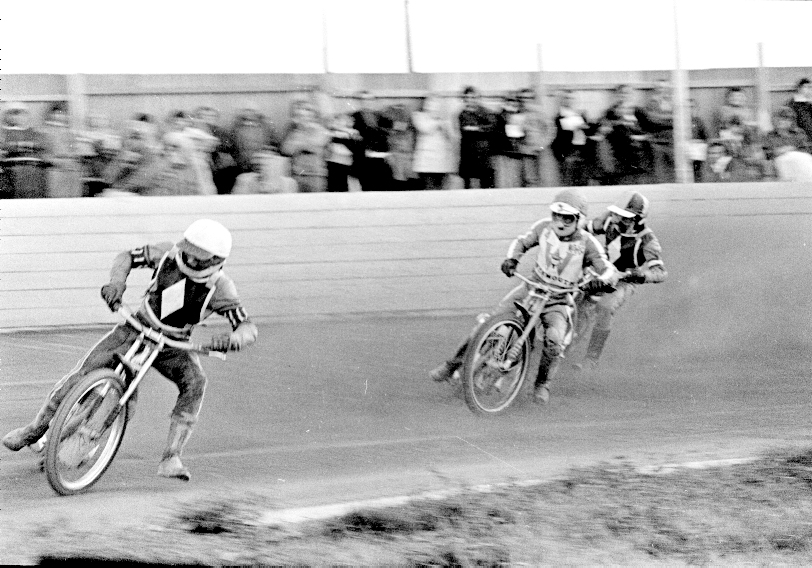
Heat 5 Newcastle Diamonds away to Weymouth Wizards 1975 (Henderson in third)

Henderson born in Brisbane, Australia, joined the Newcastle Diamonds training school as a 17-year-old in 1975.

Henderson began his British leagues career riding for the Diamonds during the 1975 New National League season. The following season in 1976, he helped Newcastle to the National League Championship.

The Diamonds were Henderson's chief team, but he was also given rides with Hull and Swindon, as guest rider to cover absences.

Henderson quit the United Kingdom after the 1977 season. Returning to Australia, his last race was at Tivoli in Queensland in 1984, riding in four heats and winning all four.

== After speedway ==
Spent some time as an auto-upholsterer before a 22 year career as a Paramedic, which included being a Flight Intensive Paramedic in rescue helicopters. Forced from the career because of back problems, he retrained as a Drug and Alcohol Counsellor, completing a degree in Social Science. Married to Sarah, with two daughters, he lives in Hobart, Tasmania.
