= Tomasz Piszcz =

Polish speedway rider

- Born: 8 June 1977 (age 49); Lublin, Poland
- Nationality: Polish

Career history

Poland
- 1995–1999, 2004–2005, 2007, 2009–2013: Lublin
- 2000: Grudziądz
- 2001–2002, 2006: Gdańsk
- 2008: Daugavpils

Great Britain
- 2004, 2006: Peterborough Panthers
- 2004, 2006: Coventry Bees
- 2005, 2006: Workington Comets
- 2005: Ipswich Witches
- 2006: Oxford Cheetahs
- 2008, 2009, 2012: Birmingham Brummies
- 2008: Lakeside Hammers
- 2008, 2009, 2011: Belle Vue Aces
- 2009: Poole Pirates

Sweden
- 2003: Bysarna

Team honours
- 2009: Premier League Pairs Champion
- 2006: Premier League Fours Champion

Tomasz Piszcz (born 8 June 1977) is a former motorcycle speedway rider from Poland.

== Speedway career ==
Piszcz began his British career riding for Peterborough Panthers in 2004.

Piszcz was part of the Workington Comets four who won the Premier League Four-Team Championship, held on 7 October 2006, at Derwent Park.

In 2009, Piszcz won the Premier League Pairs Championship partnering Jason Lyons for Birmingham during the 2009 Premier League speedway season.

Piszcz rode in the top tier of British Speedway riding for the Poole Pirates during the 2009 Elite League speedway season.
