= Kenni Larsen =

Danish speedway rider

- Born: 14 June 1988 (age 38); Odense, Denmark
- Nationality: Danish

Career history

Denmark
- 2006, 2011–2016: Outrup
- 2007–2009: Holstebro
- 2010: Vojens
- 2013–2015: Munkebo

Sweden
- 2011–2015: Smederna

Great Britain
- 2008–2010: Newcastle Diamonds
- 2011–2012: Coventry Bees
- 2013: Peterborough Panthers

Poland
- 2011: Kraków
- 2012: Ostrów
- 2013: Łódź
- 2014–2015: Rzeszów

Individual honours
- 2010: Premier League Riders' Champion

Team honours
- 2010: Premier Trophy
- 2010: Premier League Knockout Cup
- 2010: Premier League

Kenni Arendt Larsen (born 14 June 1988), known as both Kenni Arendt and Kenni Larsen, is a former motorcycle speedway rider from Denmark.

== Career ==
Born in Odense, Denmark, Larsen began his British speedway career in 2008 with Newcastle Diamonds, the first of three seasons that he rode for the club.

In 2010, Larsen won the Premier Trophy, the Premier League Knockout Cup, and the Premier League play-offs with Newcastle. He capped of a superb season by winning the Premier League Riders Championship, held on 26 September at Owlerton Stadium.

In 2011, Larsen moved up to the Elite League with Coventry Bees, staying with them in 2012 and captaining the team at Birmingham, a season in which he finished third in the team's averages. For 2013, he signed for Peterborough Panthers.

Larsen has also raced in Denmark for Vojens and Outrup and also in Poland and Sweden.

On 19 April 2016, Larsen was hospitalised and put into an induced coma after having a pellet removed from his brain following an apparent accident with an air gun. He woke from the coma on 1 May.
