= William Lawson (speedway rider) =

Scottish speedway rider

- Born: 27 February 1987 (age 39); Perth, Scotland
- Nationality: British (Scottish)

Career history
- 2002–2003: Newcastle Gems
- 2003–2004: Newcastle Diamonds
- 2005–2008, 2010, 2018–2022: Edinburgh Monarchs
- 2006–2007: Wolverhampton Wolves
- 2009: Berwick Bandits
- 2009: Glasgow Tigers
- 2010: Belle Vue Aces

Individual honours
- 2007, 2008, 2009: British Finalist
- 2008: World Under 21 Finalist

William Lawson (born 27 February 1987) is a former motorcycle speedway rider from Scotland.

== Career ==
Lawson at the age of 15, began racing in the 2002 Speedway Conference League for Newcastle Gems but broke his leg, which ended his plans to sign for Edinburgh Monarchs the following season. However, Lawson did sign for Newcastle Diamonds, where he spent the 2003 and 2004 seasons. In 2005, Lawson signed for Edinburgh Monarchs for the 2005 Premier League speedway season. He would stay with the club for four years, while also riding for Wolverhampton Wolves in 2006 and 2007.

After spells with Glasgow and Berwick in 2009, Lawson rode with the Belle Vue Aces in the British Elite League during 2010. He announced his retirement before the 2011 season.

In 2018, Lawson made a surprise comeback for one of his former clubs the Edinburgh Monarchs. He spent four more seasons with them from 2018 until 2022.

== Results ==
=== World Championships ===
- Individual Under-21 World Championship
  - 2007 - 12th placed in the Semi-Final One
  - 2008 - (Czech Republic) Pardubice - 14th placed (4 pts)
- Team Under-21 World Championship (Under-21 Speedway World Cup)
  - 2008 - 3rd placed in the Qualifying Round One

== See also ==
- Great Britain national under-21 speedway team
