= Derek Sneddon =

- Born: 27 July 1982 (age 44); Falkirk, Scotland
- Nationality: British (Scottish)

Career history
- 2000–2001, 2003, 2006–2008, 2012–2014: Edinburgh
- 2001: Glasgow
- 2002, 2009–2011: Newcastle
- 2004–2005: Armadale

Team honours
- 2005: Conference Trophy
- 2008, 2010: Premier Trophy
- 2008: Premier League
- 2010: Premier League Knockout Cup
- 2011: Premier Shield
- 2013: Premier League Fours

Derek Sneddon (born 27 July 1982) is a former motorcycle speedway rider from Scotland.

== Career ==
Born in Falkirk, Sneddon began his professional speedway career in 1998 riding in a single match for Hull Vikings. He had one off rides for Linlithgow Lightning and the Isle of Wight Islanders in 1999, before moving on to Ashfield Giants and Edinburgh Monarchs in 2000. He rode for Newcastle Diamonds in 2002 and returned to the Monarchs in 2003 but suffered a broken femur in a crash early in the season.

After regaining his fitness, Sneddon rode in the Conference League with the Armadale Devils in 2004 and 2005, winning the Conference Trophy in 2005, before returning to the Monarchs team in 2006. He spent three successive seasons with Edinburgh, being named team captain in 2007, and winning the Premier League Championship, play-offs, and Premier Trophy in 2008.

In 2009, Sneddon moved on to Newcastle Diamonds, spending three seasons there before returning to the Edinburgh team in 2012. In 2013 he again took over the team captaincy and was granted a testimonial year. Sneddon was part of the Edinburgh team that won the Premier League Four-Team Championship, which was held on 14 July 2013, at the East of England Arena.

Sneddon's final season before retirement was with Edinburgh during the 2014 Premier League speedway season.
