= Premier Trophy (speedway) =

Speedway competition

The Premier Trophy was a contest between teams competing in the Premier League in the UK. The first competition was held in 1999. The competition is usually run before the Premier League starts in April and May. The finals are usually contested in June/July. The competition was dropped from the 2011 calendar due to the expansion of the Premier League fixtures.

== Rules ==
Teams are split into four regional groups with the top teams competing in the semi-finals. The semi-finals are raced over two legs, home and away. The winners of the semi-finals then compete in the final, again raced over two legs, home and away.

=== Format ===
The competition is a mixture of league format and a knock-out competition. The competition starts with the teams split into several groups, usually by location. The current format is a North, Midland and South Group, with 5 teams in the north and midland group and 4 in the south group. The top team from each group and then the 2nd best placed team (on average points per game) qualify for the semi-finals. The winners on aggregate in the semi-final contest the final, with the final being contested with a home and away tie. The winner on aggregate is then declared Premier Trophy Champions.

== Winners ==
Year	Winners	Runners-up
1999	Newport Wasps	Edinburgh Monarchs
2000	Hull Vikings	Exeter Falcons
2001	Sheffield Tigers	Swindon Robins
2002	Trelawny Tigers	Sheffield Tigers
2003	competition not held	
2004	Exeter Falcons	Reading Racers
2005	Rye House Rockets	Workington Comets
2006	Kings Lynn Stars	Sheffield Tigers
2007	Kings Lynn Stars	Birmingham Brummies
2008	Edinburgh Monarchs	Birmingham Brummies
2009	Kings Lynn Stars	Edinburgh Monarchs
2010	Newcastle Diamonds	Birmingham Brummies
2011	competition not held	
