= Mark Lemon (speedway rider) =

Australian speedway rider (born 1973)

- Born: 12 February 1973 (age 53); Bairnsdale, Victoria
- Nationality: Australian

Career history

Great Britain
- 1990, 1991, 1997, 1998, 2004: Poole Pirates
- 1992–1993: Middlesbrough Bears
- 1996, 2000, 2002: Oxford Cheetahs
- 1999: Eastbourne Eagles
- 2003: Somerset Rebels
- 2012: Belle Vue Aces
- 2004–2005: Exeter Falcons
- 2006: Stoke Potters
- 2006–2008: Reading Racers
- 2009: Newport Wasps
- 2009: Swindon Robins
- 2009–2012: Newcastle Diamonds
- 2013: Plymouth Devils
- 2014: Redcar Bears
- 2014: Glasgow Tigers

Sweden
- 1998–2000: Bysarna
- 2000: Indianerna

Individual honours
- 1993, 1996, 2012: Victorian Champion

Team honours
- 1990: British League Div 2
- 2004, 2010: Premier Trophy
- 2010: Premier League
- 2011: Premier Shield
- 2000: Allsvenskan Winner

Mark Ian John Lemon (born 12 February 1973) is an Australian former motorcycle speedway rider. He won the Victoria State Championship on three occasions and is currently the Manager of both the Senior and Under-21 Australian speedway teams. He is also the manager of the Belle Vue Aces in the SGB Premiership.

== Biography ==
Born in Bairnsdale, Victoria, Lemon took up speedway at the age of twelve.

Lemon began his career in British speedway in 1990, riding for Poole Pirates in the team that won the British League Division Two. He rode for Poole again in 1991 but more regularly and successfully for Middlesbrough Bears, for whom he also rode in 1992. Swindon Robins attempted for the next three seasons to sign Lemon, but he was denied a work permit. He won the Victoria State Championship in 1992/93, winning again in 1995/96 and 2011/12, and after finishing in sixth place in the Australian Championship in the 1995/96 season was granted a work permit for 1996, signing for Oxford Cheetahs. He rode three seasons with Oxford in 1996, 2000 and 2002.

Lemon went on to ride for several teams in the years that followed, and by 2003 improved to heat leader standard with Somerset Rebels. Successful seasons followed with Exeter Falcons (with whom he won the Premier Trophy) and Stoke Potters (where he won the Pride of the Potters individual meeting in 2004) before signing for Reading Racers in 2006, going on to act as team captain. He captained Newport Wasps in 2009 before losing his place in the team mid-season. More recently he has been one of the top riders in the Newcastle Diamonds Premier League team (also captaining the team) as well as having spells in the Elite League with Swindon and Belle Vue Aces. Initially on loan form parent club Poole Pirates, lemon was signed on a full transfer by Diamonds in 2010. With Newcastle he won the Premier Trophy and the League play-offs in 2010 and the Premier Shield in 2011. He suffered several injuries in his time with the Diamonds, including several crushed vertebrae sustained in the 2009/10 Australian final, and several shoulder injuries. In December 2012 he signed to ride for Plymouth Devils in 2013.

In 2009, a 20th anniversary testimonial meeting was held at Somerset's Oaktree Arena between an Australia Select and a Rest of the World Select.

Lemon has represented Australia on several occasions, making his debut for his country in July 1997 against England.

In 2022, Lemon managed the Belle Vue Aces to their first league title since 1993.

== Family ==
Lemon's father-in-law is the former rider Tom Owen.

== Major titles and placings ==
=== Individual ===
- Australian Under-16 Championship: 3rd (1988)
- Victorian Championship: 1992/3, 1995/6, 2011/12
- Australian Championship: 2nd (2000)

=== Team ===
- British League Division Two: 1990 (Poole)
- Premier Trophy: 2004 (Exeter), 2010 (Newcastle)
- Premier League: 2010 (Newcastle)
- Premier Shield: 2011 (Newcastle)
