= Richard Sweetman =

Australian speedway rider

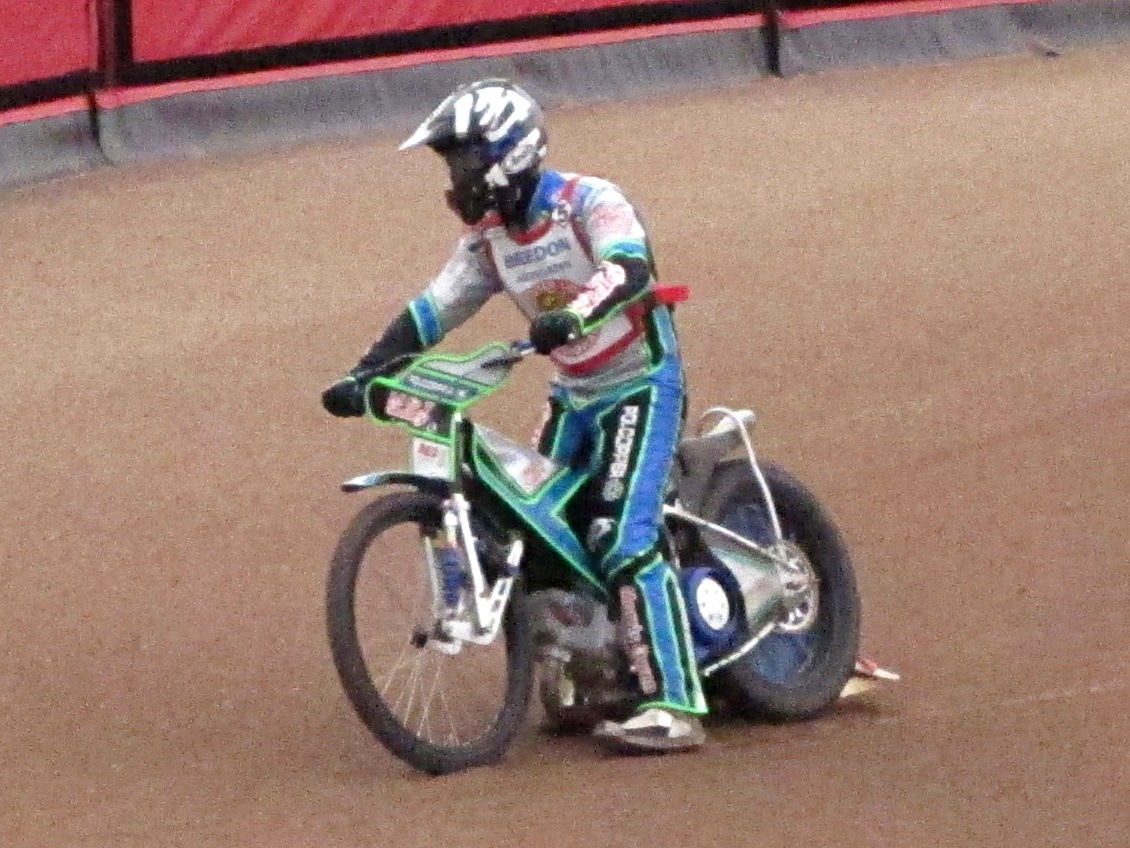
- Born: 28 July 1990 (age 36); Maitland, New South Wales, Australia
- Nationality: Australian

Career history
- 2008–2009: Swindon Robins
- 2008: Isle of Wight Islanders
- 2009–2010: Birmingham Brummies
- 2009: Belle Vue Aces
- 2010: Coventry Bees
- 2011: Leicester Lions
- 2011: Glasgow Tigers

Individual honours
- 2007: NSW Under-21 Champion
- 2007: Australian Long Track Champion

Team honours
- 2010: Premier League Fours Champion

Richard Thomas Sweetman (born 28 July 1990 in Maitland, New South Wales) is an Australian former motorcycle speedway rider.

== Career ==
Born in Maitland, the birthplace of motorcycle speedway (1926), Sweetman won the New South Wales Under-21 individual championship in 2007.

Sweetman rode for the Swindon Robins, Isle of Wight Islanders, Birmingham Brummies, Belle Vue Aces, and Coventry Bees.

Sweetman was part of the Birmingham four who won the Premier League Four-Team Championship, on 15 August 2010, at the East of England Arena.

Sweetman signed for Leicester Lions for the 2011 season, but was allowed to leave Leicester in June, stating that he wanted to take a break from the sport, only to sign for Glasgow Tigers a few days later. However, 2011 was his last season in Britain.
