= 2013 British Speedway Championship =

Seasons
- ← 2012 2014 →

The 2013 British Speedway Championship was the 53rd edition of the British Speedway Championship. The Final took place on 13 May at Monmore Green in Wolverhampton, England. The Championship was won by Tai Woffinden, who beat defending champion Scott Nicholls, Chris Harris and Craig Cook in the final heat. It was the first time Woffinden had won the title.

== Results ==
=== Semi-Final 1 ===
- (Scotland) Edinburgh
- 19 April 2013

Pos.	Rider	Points	Details
1	Daniel King	14	(2,3,3,3,3)
2	Craig Cook	14	(3,3,2,3,3)
3	Edward Kennett	12	(3,3,3,2,1)
4	Chris Harris	11	(3,X,3,3,2)
5	Richie Worrall	11	(3,1,1,3,3)
6	Stuart Robson	11	(2,2,2,2,3)
7	James Wright	8	(0,2,3,1,2)
8	James Grieves	7	(2,0,1,2,2)
9	Charles Wright	6	(2,1,0,1,2)
10	Derek Sneddon	6	(0,2,2,1,1)
11	Ricky Ashworth	6	(1,1,2,2,X)
12	Kyle Howarth	4	(X,3,1,0,X)
13	Chris Mills	4	(1,2,X,0,1)
14	Richard Lawson	3	(1,0,1,1,0)
15	Ashley Morris	2	(1,F,0,0,1)
16	Steve Worrall	1	(E,1,E,0,0)
17	James McBrain	DNS	
18	Tommy Fenwick	DNS	

=== Semi-Final 2 ===
- (England) Sheffield
- 25 April 2013

Pos.	Rider	Points	Details
1	Tai Woffinden	15	(3,3,3,3,3)
2	Josh Auty	12	(3,1,3,3,2)
3	Oliver Allen	11	(2,3,3,3,M)
4	Richard Hall	11	(2,2,2,2,3)
5	Ashley Birks	10	(3,3,2,0,2)
6	Chris Schramm	9	(3,2,2,1,1)
7	Scott Nicholls	9	(1,1,2,2,3)
8	Joe Haines	8	(1,3,1,1,2)
9	Jason Garrity	8	(2,2,3,R,1)
10	Kyle Newman	7	(2,0,0,3,2)
11	David Howe	6	(1,1,R,1,3)
12	Tom Perry	4	(1,0,1,2,0)
13	Robert Branford	3	(0,1,0,2,0)
14	Ben Barker	3	(0,2,1,-,-)
15	Robert Mear	2	(0,0,1,0,1)
16	James Sarjeant	2	(0,0,0,1,1)
17	Ben Hopwood (res)	0	(-,-,0,0,0)
18	Jordan Tyrer (res)	DNS	

=== The Final ===
- (England) Monmore Green Stadium, Wolverhampton
- 13 May 2013

Placing	Rider	Total	1	2	3	4	5	6	7	8	9	10	11	12	13	14	15	16	17	18	19	20	Pts	Pos	21	22
1	(6) Tai Woffinden	15		3				3			3							3			3		15	1		3
2	(7) Scott Nicholls	11		1					1					3	3					3			11	5	2	2
3	(11) Chris Harris	13			3				2		2					3						3	13	2		1
4	(1) Craig Cook	12	3				3				1				2				3				12	3	3	0
5	(15) Edward Kennett	12				3			3			3						2	1				12	4	1	
6	(12) Daniel King	10			2					3		2			1						2		10	6	0	
7	(5) Jason Garrity	8		2			2					0					3					1	8	7		
8	(14) Josh Auty	8				2		2					2		0							2	8	8		
9	(4) Chris Schramm	6	1							2				2				1				0	6	9		
10	(3) Richie Worrall	5	0						0				3				2				0		5	10		
11	(16) Kyle Howarth	5				1				1	0						1			2			5	11		
12	(2) Oliver Allen	5	2					1				1				0				1			5	12		
13	(8) Ben Barker	4		0						0			0			2			2				4	13		
14	(10) Ashley Birks	2			1			0						1			0		0				2	14		
15	(17) Kyle Newman	2																					2	15		
16	(13) Joe Haines	1				0	1							0		0					0		1	16		
17	(9) James Wright	1			0		1						0					0		0			1	17		
Placing	Rider	Total	1	2	3	4	5	6	7	8	9	10	11	12	13	14	15	16	17	18	19	20	Pts	Pos	21	22

m - exclusion for exceeding two minute time allowance • t - exclusion for touching the tapes • x - other exclusion • e - retired or mechanical failure • f - fell • ns - non-starter • nc - non-classify

gate A - inside	gate B	gate C	gate D - outside

=== Under 21 final ===
Robert Branford won the British Speedway Under 21 Championship. The final was held at Monmore Green Stadium on 23 April.

Pos.	Rider	Points	Final
1	Robert Branford	12	3
2	Kyle Howarth	14	2
3	Jason Garrity	15	1
4	Ashley Morris	13	0
5	Tom Perry	11	
6	James Sarjeant	9	
7	Darryl Ritchings	8	
8	Danny Stoneman	7	
9	Joe Jacobs	7	
10	Dan Greenwood	6	
11	Ben Morley	4	
12	Stefan Nielsen	4	
13	Shane Hazelden	3	
14	Max Clegg	3	
15	Josh Bates	3	
16	Matt Williamson	1	
