= 2012 British Speedway Championship =

Seasons
- ← 2011 2013 →

The 2012 British Speedway Championship was the 52nd edition of the British Speedway Championship. The Final took place on 30 July at Monmore Green in Wolverhampton, England. The Championship was won by defending champion Scott Nicholls, who beat Chris Harris, Tai Woffinden and Edward Kennett in the final heat. It was the seventh time Nicholls had won the title, making him the most successful rider in the history of the competition.

== Results ==
=== The Final ===
- (England) Monmore Green Stadium, Wolverhampton
- 30 July 2012

Placing	Rider	Total	1	2	3	4	5	6	7	8	9	10	11	12	13	14	15	16	17	18	19	20	Pts	Pos	21	22
1	(8) Scott Nicholls	13		1						3			3			3			3				13	1		3
2	(16) Chris Harris	12				3				2	3						1			3			12	3	2	2
3	(5) Tai Woffinden	12		2			3					2					3					2	12	4	3	1
4	(2) Edward Kennett	13	3					3				3				2				2			13	2		0
5	(10) Simon Stead	11			2			2						3			2		2				11	5	1	
6	(9) Ben Barker	11			3		2						2					3		1			11	6	0	
7	(11) Craig Cook	10			1				3		2					1						3	10	7		
8	(3) Adam Roynon	7	2						2				0				0				3		7	8		
9	(14) Ricky Ashworth	7				2		0					1		3							1	7	9		
10	(6) Stuart Robson	7		3				1			1							1			1		7	10		
11	(15) Leigh Lanham	6				1			1			1						2	1				6	11		
12	(13) Josh Auty	4				0	0							2		0					2		4	12		
13	(17) Tom Perry	2																					2	13		
14	(12) Joe Haines	2			0					1		0			1						0		2	14		
15	(1) Robert Mear	2	1				1				0				-				-				2	15		
16	(4) Richard Lawson	1	0							0				1				0				0	1	16		
17	(7) Daniel King	0		0					0					-	-					-			0	17		
Placing	Rider	Total	1	2	3	4	5	6	7	8	9	10	11	12	13	14	15	16	17	18	19	20	Pts	Pos	21	22

m - exclusion for exceeding two minute time allowance • t - exclusion for touching the tapes • x - other exclusion • e - retired or mechanical failure • f - fell • ns - non-starter • nc - non-classify

gate A - inside	gate B	gate C	gate D - outside

=== Under 21 final ===
Joe Haines won the British Speedway Under 21 Championship for the second time. The final was held at Monmore Green Stadium on 24 April.

Pos.	Rider	Points	SF	Final
1	Joe Haines	11	3	3
2	Tom Perry	12	x	2
3	Kyle Howarth	11	2	1
4	Richie Worrall	12	x	0
5	Steve Worrall	11	1	
6	Kyle Newman	9	0	
7	Stefan Nielsen	8		
8	Jason Garrity	7		
9	Robert Branford	7		
10	Jerran Hart	7		
11	Joe Jacobs	5		
12	Ashley Morris	5		
13	Ben Morley	4		
14	Ben Reade	3		
15	Marc Owen	2		
16	Adam Wrathall	1		
17	James Sarjeant	0		
