= 2011 British Speedway Championship =

Seasons
- ← 2010 2012 →

The 2011 British Speedway Championship was the 51st edition of the British Speedway Championship. The Final took place on 6 June at Monmore Green in Wolverhampton, England. The Championship was won by Scott Nicholls, who beat defending champion Chris Harris, Tai Woffinden and Edward Kennett in the final heat. It was the sixth time Nicholls had won the title, equaling the record held by New Zealand's Barry Briggs.

== Results ==
=== Semi-Final 1 ===
- (England) Sheffield
- 19 May 2011

Pos.	Rider	Points	Details
1	Scott Nicholls	14	(3,2,3,3,3)
2	Ben Barker	13	(2,3,2,3,3)
3	Richard Hall	11	(2,3,3,1,2)
4	Daniel King	11	(2,3,3,2,1)
5	Chris Harris	10	(3,F,1,3,3)
6	Jordan Frampton	9	(3,2,0,2,2)
7	Ricky Ashworth	9	(X,3,2,2,2)
8	Josh Auty	7	(3,1,R,3,R)
9	Ritchie Hawkins	6	(2,0,2,2,0)
10	James Wright	5	(0,1,3,0,1)
11	Luke Bowen	5	(1,1,0,1,2)
12	Kyle Newman	5	(1,2,1,0,1)
13	Derek Sneddon	4	(1,2,0,1,F)
14	Andrew Tully	4	(1,F,1,1,1)
15	Ashley Birks	3	(-,-,-,-,3)
16	Paul Cooper	3	(0,1,2,0,0)
17	Craig Cook	1	(R,R,1,R,-)

=== Semi-Final 2 ===
- (England) Scunthorpe
- 20 May 2011

Pos.	Rider	Points	Details
1	David Howe	15	(3,3,3,3,3)
2	Edward Kennett	14	(2,3,3,3,3)
3	Ben Wilson	13	(3,2,3,2,3)
4	Stuart Robson	10	(3,2,1,3,1)
5	Leigh Lanham	10	(0,2,3,3,2)
6	Lewis Bridger	10	(2,3,2,1,2)
7	Lee Richardson	8	(1,3,X,1,3)
8	Jerran Hart	7	(3,1,1,2,X)
9	Chris Schramm	6	(2,F,2,0,2)
10	Oliver Allen	6	(2,0,2,2,X)
11	Richard Lawson	6	(0,1,2,2,1)
12	Adam Wrathall	4	(1,0,1,1,1)
13	Richie Worrall	4	(1,1,1,1,0)
14	Lee Complin	3	(1,2,F,0,0)
15	Joe Haines	2	(0,0,0,0,2)
16	Chris Mills	1	(0,1,0,0,F)

=== The Final ===
- (England) Monmore Green Stadium, Wolverhampton
- 6 June 2011

Placing	Rider	Total	1	2	3	4	5	6	7	8	9	10	11	12	13	14	15	16	17	18	19	20	Pts	Pos	21	22
1	(5) Scott Nicholls	13		3			2					3					3					2	13	3	2	3
2	(14) Chris Harris	13				3		3					3		1							3	13	2		2
3	(1) Tai Woffinden	15	3				3				3				3				3				15	1		1
4	(10) Edward Kennett	12			3			2						3			2		2				12	4	3	0
5	(11) Ben Barker	9			2				2		1					3						1	9	6	1	
6	(15) Lee Richardson	11				2			3			2						3	1				11	5	0	
7	(8) Stuart Robson	8		2						3			2			1			0				8	7		
8	(2) Lewis Bridger	8	2					1				0				2				3			8	8		
9	(13) Leigh Lanham	7				1	1							2		0					3		7	9		
10	(6) Oliver Allen	6		1				0			2							2			1		6	10		
11	(3) Daniel King	5	1						1				1				0				2		5	11		
12	(7) Jordan Frampton	4		0					0					0	2					2			4	12		
13	(16) Ricky Ashworth	4				0				2	0						1			1			4	13		
14	(9) Richard Hall	2			1		0						0					1		0			2	14		
15	(12) Jerran Hart	2			0					1		1			0						0		2	15		
16	(17) Tom Perry	1																					1	16		
17	(4) David Howe	0	0							-				-				-				-	0	17		
17	(18) Ashley Morris	0																					0	17		
Placing	Rider	Total	1	2	3	4	5	6	7	8	9	10	11	12	13	14	15	16	17	18	19	20	Pts	Pos	21	22

m - exclusion for exceeding two minute time allowance • t - exclusion for touching the tapes • x - other exclusion • e - retired or mechanical failure • f - fell • ns - non-starter • nc - non-classify

gate A - inside	gate B	gate C	gate D - outside

=== Under 21 final ===
Tai Woffinden won the British Speedway Under 21 Championship. The final was held at the Arena Essex Raceway on 15 April.

Pos.	Rider	Points	SF	Final
1	Tai Woffinden	15	x	3
2	Steve Worrall	11	2	2
3	Joe Haines	11	3	1
4	Josh Auty	13	x	0
5	Kyle Howarth	9	1	
6	Jason Garrity	9	0	
7	Paul Starke	8		
8	Ashley Morris	8		
9	Marc Owen	7		
10	Jerran Hart	7		
11	Jamie Pickard	7		
12	Tom Perry	5		
13	Shane Hazelden	5		
14	Ashley Birks	4		
15	Brendan Johnson	1		
16	Joe Jacobs	1		
17	Ben Reade (res)	0		
