= 2010 British Speedway Championship =

Seasons
- ← 2009 2011 →

The 2010 British Speedway Championship was the 50th edition of the British Speedway Championship. The Final took place on 14 June at Monmore Green in Wolverhampton, England. The Championship was won by defending champion Chris Harris, who beat Scott Nicholls, Ben Barker and Daniel King in the final heat. It was the third time Harris had won the title.

== Results ==
=== Semi-Final 1 ===
- (England) Owlerton Stadium, Sheffield
- 6 May 2010

Pos.	Rider	Points	Details
1	Scott Nicholls	9	(3,3,3)
2	Jordan Frampton	9	(3,3,3)
3	Oliver Allen	7	(3,3,1)
4	James Wright	6	(1,2,3)
5	Andrew Tully	6	(2,1,3)
6	Ben Barker	5	(3,X,2)
7	Stuart Robson	5	(0,3,2)
8	Daniel King	5	(2,2,1)
9	Richard Hall	5	(1,2,2)
10	Tai Woffinden	4	(2,E,2)
11	Ricky Ashworth	4	(2,1,1)
12	Richard Lawson	2	(0,2,0)
13	Kyle Howarth	2	(1,1,0)
14	William Lawson	2	(1,E,1)
15	Andre Compton	0	(0,F,0)
16	James Sarjeant	0	(-,-,0)
17	David Howe	0	(E,R,-)

- The meeting was abandoned after 12 heats due to rain. Result stood.

=== Semi-Final 2 ===
- (England) King's Lynn
- 12 May 2010

Pos.	Rider	Points	Details
1	Edward Kennett	14	(3,3,3,2,3)
2	Chris Harris	14	(3,3,3,3,2)
3	Simon Stead	13	(1,3,3,3,3)
4	Lewis Bridger	13	(2,2,3,3,3)
5	Chris Schramm	10	(3,3,1,2,1)
6	Paul Clews	8	(3,1,2,0,2)
7	Jason King	8	(1,2,2,1,2)
8	Leigh Lanham	7+3	(2,1,2,2,0)
9	Chris Neath	7+2	(2,1,1,2,1)
10	Darren Mallett	7	(-,1,3,1,2)
11	Adam Roynon	5	(1,0,0,1,3)
12	Carl Wilkinson	5	(R,2,2,1,X)
13	Chris Mills	3	(R,2,R,M,1)
14	Luke Bowen	3	(1,1,1,0,0)
15	Joe Haines	2	(2,0,0,-,-)
16	Lee Richardson	0	(R,X,-,-,-)
16	Ben Wilson	0	(R,R,-,-,-)

=== The Final ===
- (England) Wolverhampton
- 14 June 2010

Placing	Rider	Total	1	2	3	4	5	6	7	8	9	10	11	12	13	14	15	16	17	18	19	20	Pts	Pos	21	22
1	(2) Chris Harris	12	3					3				3				0				3			12	3	3	3
2	(4) Scott Nicholls	14	2							3				3				3				3	14	1		2
3	(13) Ben Barker	12				3	3							0		3					3		12	2		1
4	(11) Daniel King	11			3				3		2					2						1	11	4	2	0
5	(8) Edward Kennett	11		3						1			3			1			3				11	5	1	
6	(15) Stuart Robson	9				1			2			2						2	2				9	6	0	
7	(10) Lewis Bridger	7			1			1						2			3		0				7	7		
8	(3) Oliver Allen	7	0						1				2				2				2		7	8		
9	(9) Simon Stead	7			2		2						0					1		2			7	9		
10	(5) James Wright	7		2			1					1					1					2	7	10		
11	(6) Jason King	6		1				2			3							0			0		6	11		
12	(16) Leigh Lanham	6				2				2	1						0			1			6	12		
13	(12) Jordan Frampton	4			0					0		0			3						1		4	13		
14	(7) Paul Clews	3		0					0					1	2					0			3	14		
15	(1) Andrew Tully	3	1				0				0				1				1				3	15		
16	(14) Chris Schramm	1				0		0					1		0							0	1	16		
17	(17) Richard Hall	0																					0	17		
Placing	Rider	Total	1	2	3	4	5	6	7	8	9	10	11	12	13	14	15	16	17	18	19	20	Pts	Pos	21	22

m - exclusion for exceeding two minute time allowance • t - exclusion for touching the tapes • x - other exclusion • e - retired or mechanical failure • f - fell • ns - non-starter • nc - non-classify

gate A - inside	gate B	gate C	gate D - outside

=== Under 21 final ===
Joe Haines won the British Speedway Under 21 Championship for the first time. The final was held at Arena Essex Raceway on 16 April.

Pos.	Rider	Points	SF	Final
1	Joe Haines	14	3	3
2	Tai Woffinden	14	x	2
3	Lewis Bridger	14	x	1
4	Kyle Hughes	9	2	0
5	Jerran Hart	10	1	
6	Josh Auty	11	0	
7	Robert Mear	9		
8	Simon Lambert	8		
9	Paul Starke	7		
10	Kyle Howarth	6		
11	Steve Worrall	5		
12	Brendan Johnson	3		
13	Kyle Newman	3		
14	Aaron Baseby	3		
15	Richard Franklin	3		
16	Scott Campos	1		
