= 2008 British Speedway Championship =

Seasons
- ← 2007 2009 →

The 2008 British Speedway Championship was the 48th edition of the British Speedway Championship. The Final took place on 29 May at the Abbey Stadium in Swindon, England. The Championship was won by Scott Nicholls, who beat Edward Kennett, Tai Woffinden and Chris Harris in the final heat.

== British Final ==
- 29 May 2008
- (England) Abbey Stadium, Swindon

=== Qualifying ===
Pos.	Rider	Points	Details
1	Chris Harris	14	(2,3,3,3,3)
2	Scott Nicholls	12	(3,3,D,3,3)
3	James Wright	11	(0,2,3,3,3)
4	Tai Woffinden	11	(1,3,3,1,3)
5	Simon Stead	10	(3,1,2,2,2)
6	Edward Kennett	9	(3,2,2,1,1)
7	Leigh Lanham	8	(2,3,0,2,1)
8	Lewis Bridger	8	(2,1,U,3,2)
9	Adam Roynon	6	(2,0,2,1,1)
10	Daniel King	6	(1,2,1,1,1)
11	David Howe	5	(3,D,2,0,0)
12	William Lawson	5	(0,1,0,2,2)
13	Chris Neath	4	(1,0,1,2,0)
14	Richard Hall	4	(1,2,1,0,0)
15	Ricky Ashworth	3	(0,0,3,0,0)
16	Ben Barker	3	(U,D,1,0,2)

=== Semi-final ===
Pos.	Rider	Points
1	Edward Kennett	3
2	Tai Woffinden	2
3	Simon Stead	1
4	James Wright	0

=== Final heat ===
Pos.	Rider	Points
Gold	Scott Nicholls	3
Silver	Edward Kennett	2
Bronze	Tai Woffinden	1
4	Chris Harris	0

== British Under 21 final ==
Tai Woffinden won the British Speedway Under 21 Championship The final was held at Arena Essex Raceway on 25 April.

Pos.	Rider	Points	SF	Final
1	Tai Woffinden	14	x	3
2	Adam Roynon	13	2	2
3	Ben Barker	11	3	1
4	Lewis Bridger	13	x	0
5	William Lawson	11	1	
6	Steve Boxall	10	0	
7	Joe Haines	9		
8	Jack Roberts	8		
9	Josh Auty	8		
10	Lee Smart	6		
11	Sean Stoddart	5		
12	Charles Wright	5		
13	Daniel Halsey	3		
14	Harland Cook	2		
15	Andrew Tully (res)	2		
16	Lee Strudwick	1		
17	Danny Betson	0		
18	Kyle Hughes (res)	0		
