= 2009 British Speedway Championship =

Seasons
- ← 2008 2010 →

The 2009 British Speedway Championship was the 49th edition of the British Speedway Championship. The Final took place on 20 May at Wimborne Road in Poole, England. The Championship was won by Chris Harris, who beat Edward Kennett, Tai Woffinden and Lee Richardson in the final heat. It was the second time Harris had won the title.

== Results ==
=== The Final ===
- (England) Wimborne Road, Poole
- 20 May 2009

Placing	Rider	Total	1	2	3	4	5	6	7	8	9	10	11	12	13	14	15	16	17	18	19	20	Pts	Pos	21	22
1	(11) Chris Harris	12			3				2		2					3						2	12	3	3	3
2	(5) Edward Kennett	13		2			3					3					2					3	13	2		2
3	(10) Tai Woffinden	11			2			2						2			3		2				11	4	2	1
4	(7) Lee Richardson	14		3					3					3	3					2			14	1		0
5	(12) Simon Stead	9			0					2		2			2						3		9	6	1	
6	(9) Scott Nicholls	10			1		2						1					3		3			10	5	0	
7	(14) Lewis Bridger	8				2		3					3		0							0	8	7		
8	(16) Daniel King	8				3				0	3						1			1			8	8		
9	(1) David Howe	8	3				0				1				1				3				8	9		
10	(8) James Wright	6		0						3			2			0			1				6	10		
11	(13) Joe Screen	5				0	1							0		2					2		5	11		
12	(4) Ricky Ashworth	5	0							1				1				2				1	5	12		
13	(2) Lee Complin	4	2					1				0				1				0			4	13		
14	(15) Jason Bunyan	4				1			1			1						1	0				4	14		
15	(3) William Lawson	2	1						0				0				0				1		2	15		
16	(6) Jason King	1		1				0			0							0			0		1	16		
17	(17) Danny Warwick	-0																					-0	17		
Placing	Rider	Total	1	2	3	4	5	6	7	8	9	10	11	12	13	14	15	16	17	18	19	20	Pts	Pos	21	22

m - exclusion for exceeding two minute time allowance • t - exclusion for touching the tapes • x - other exclusion • e - retired or mechanical failure • f - fell • ns - non-starter • nc - non-classify

gate A - inside	gate B	gate C	gate D - outside

=== Under 21 final ===
Lewis Bridger won the British Speedway Under 21 Championship The final was held at Arena Essex Raceway on 24 April.

Pos.	Rider	Points	SF	Final
1	Lewis Bridger	15	x	3
2	Tai Woffinden	10	2	2
3	Joe Haines	11	3	1
4	Ben Barker	13	x	0
5	Robert Mear	13	1	
6	Josh Auty	10	0	
7	Simon Lambert	9		
8	Kyle Hughes	9		
9	Lee Smart	8		
10	Jamie Courtney	6		
11	Mark Baseby	4		
12	Brendan Johnson	4		
13	Paul Starke	3		
14	Kyle Newman	2		
15	Ben Hopwood	2		
16	Charles Wright	1		
17	Ben Taylor (res)	1		
18	Greg Blair (res)	0		
