= 2010 Premier League speedway season =

British motorcycle speedway season

- League: Premier League
- Champions: Edinburgh Monarchs
- Knockout Cup: Newcastle Diamonds
- Premier Trophy: Newcastle Diamonds
- Young Shield: Workington Comets
- Individual: Kenni Larsen
- Pairs: Sheffield Tigers
- Fours: Birmingham Brummies
- Highest average: Ryan Fisher
- Division/s above: 2010 Elite League
- Division/s below: 2010 National League

The 2010 Premier League Season was the second division of British speedway. The regular season league was won by the Edinburgh Monarchs but Newcastle Diamonds won the playoffs. The first fixtures of the season took place on 5 April, and the season ended on 31 October 2010. The King's Lynn Stars were the defending champions from 2009. The Newcastle Diamonds won most of the other awards.

== Season overview ==
The 2010 Premier League campaign was a successful campaign for both the Edinburgh Monarchs and Newcastle Diamonds. The Monarchs finished the season as Premier League Champions, having amassed 74 points, 16 points clear of the nearest rival (The Diamonds).

Although the Monarchs dominated the League, it was the Diamonds that took the most silverware of the season by winning the Premier League playoffs (against Sheffield Tigers), the Premier Trophy (against Birmingham Brummies), and the Premier League Knockout Cup (against Edinburgh Monarchs). For the other competitions, the Sheffield Tigers were victorious in the Premier League Pairs, with Ricky Ashworth and Josh Auty taking the crown ahead of the Brummies pair. However, the Brummies were victorious in the Premier League Fours, with them dominating the event throughout. The Dane Kenni Larsen then finished off a remarkable season for the Diamonds by being crowned PLRC champion and only narrowingly missing out on the Highest CMA for the season, with the Monarchs' American Ryan Fisher achieving 9.69 average for the season.

== Fixtures and results ==
Home\Away	BER	BIR	EDI	GLA	KL	ND	NW	RED	RH	SS	SHE	SOM	STO	WOR
Berwick Bandits		50-43	54-42	42-48	39-50	61-32	46-43	56-29	50-40	58-35	54-39	58-35	44-49	57-33
Birmingham Brummies	60-32		41-48	54-40	61-32	60-32	61-29	62-28	53-41	52-40	54-38	51-39	58-34	48-42
Edinburgh Monarchs	50-39	54-41		64-26	41-49	61-31	52-38	54-35	49-43	59-34	56-35	58-35	58-32	64-26
Glasgow Tigers	42-48	46-44	44-51		54-41	37-53	46-50	53-30	42-49	42-52	41-48	47-43	53-40	49-41
Kings Lynn Stars	64-30	49-41	42-53	53-42		51-45	49-44	50-40	56-39	55-35	58-34	45-48	60-35	49-44
Newcastle Diamonds	67-27	60-35	41-51	62-33	58-36		66-26	60-33	56-38	53-39	56-35	61-33	55-38	55-39
Newport Wasps	52-40	39-52	33-39	53-40	60-35	44-46		42-48	57-35	61-29	47-43	51-42	48-43	37-52
Redcar Bears	40-50	44-46	44-46	46-46	47-43	40-50	51-43		42-51	49-44	44-49	41-51	51-42	43-50
Rye House Rockets	59-33	47-43	35-55	51-41	53-40	53-43	44-46	68-24		45-45	50-39	53-42	61-31	57-36
Scunthorpe Scorpions	62-28	55-39	41-48	62-30	55-37	52-39	42-45	57-34	55-37		41-51	56-40	51-39	56-36
Sheffield Tigers	54-39	46-44	41-49	49-44	56-37	43-47	47-42	49-35	55-39	61-32		50-43	61-33	55-38
Somerset Rebels	58-34	42-48	45-45	45-45	58-34	42-48	50-40	55-38	46-47	47-43	48-45		55-38	56-37
Stoke Potters	49-41	49-42	41-51	50-41	49-43	42-48	40-52	50-40	52-41	53-40	43-47	52-37		48-42
Workington Comets	43-47	47-42	51-42	51-40	52-43	47-43	55-40	50-43	62-32	56-36	42-47	62-33	57-35	

Last updated: December 10, 2010. Source: BSPA

Colours: Blue = home win; Red = away win; White = draw

Home team listed in the left-hand column

== League table ==
Pos	Club	M	Home				Away					F	A	Pts
Pos	Club	M	3W	2W	D	L	4W	3W	D	1L	L	F	A	Pts
1	Edinburgh Monarchs	26	11	1	0	1	7	3	1	0	2	1317	1039	74
2	Newcastle Diamonds	26	12	0	0	1	2	4	0	2	5	1307	1096	58
3	Birmingham Brummies	26	11	1	0	1	1	2	0	5	5	1275	1102	50
4	Sheffield Tigers	26	8	3	0	2	2	3	0	2	6	1217	1156	49
5	Rye House Rockets	26	9	1	1	2	2	1	0	1	9	1217	1183	42
6	Workington Comets	26	9	2	0	2	2	0	0	3	8	1204	1184	42
7	Kings Lynn Stars	26	8	3	0	2	2	0	0	2	9	1201	1213	40
8	Berwick Bandits	26	9	1	0	3	1	2	0	0	10	1157	1218	39
9	Scunthorpe Scorpions	26	10	0	0	3	1	0	1	2	9	1189	1194	38
10	Newport Wasps	26	6	2	0	5	1	3	0	3	6	1162	1193	38
11	Somerset Rebels	26	6	2	2	3	1	1	0	1	10	1168	1227	32
12	Stoke Potters	26	6	3	0	4	0	1	0	1	11	1106	1277	28
13	Glasgow Tigers	26	4	2	0	7	0	1	2	1	9	1112	1272	24
14	Redcar Bears	26	2	2	1	8	0	1	0	0	12	1039	1317	14

Key:
Premier League playoffs

Home: 3W = Home win by 7 points or more; 2W = Home win by between 1 and 6 points
Away: 4W = Away win by 7 points or more; 3W = Away win by between 1 and 6 points; 1L = Away loss by 6 points or less
M = Meetings; D = Draws; L = Losses; F = Race points for; A = Race points against; +/- = Race points difference; Pts = Total Points

Last updated: October 20, 2010

Source: BSPA

== Play offs ==
Semifinals

First leg

24 September 2010	Edinburgh Monarchs; Ryan Fisher 15	59–31	Sheffield Tigers; Josef Franc 10	Armadale Stadium, Edinburgh

6 October 2010	Birmingham Brummies; Jason Lyons 12	48–42	Newcastle Diamonds; Kenni Larsen 15	Perry Barr Stadium

Second leg

30 September 2010	Sheffield Tigers; Josh Auty 12+1; Ricky Ashworth 12+1; Richard Hall 12+1	61 (92)–(90) 31	Edinburgh Monarchs; Ryan Fisher 10	Owlerton Stadium

10 October 2010	Newcastle Diamonds; Mark Lemon 16+1	48 (92)–(90) 42	Birmingham Brummies; Jason Lyons 10; Aaron Summers 10	Newcastle Stadium

Final

First leg

14 October 2010; 19.45	Sheffield Tigers; Ricky Ashworth 14	53–43	Newcastle Diamonds; Rene Bach 14	Owlerton Stadium

1	Ricky Ashworth	3, 3, 3, 2, 3	14
2	Hugh Skidmore	2', 3, 1, 1', 1	8+2
3	Josef Franc	,	R/R
4	Richard Hall	2', 1, 3, 3, 2, 0	11+1
5	Josh Auty	2, 2, 3, 1	8+1
6	Adam Roynon (guest)	2', 1', 1, N	4+2
7	Simon Lambert	3, 1', 0, 2, 2', 0	8+2
Manager: Eric Boocock

1	Kenni Larsen	0, 6^, 2, 3, 1'	12+1
2	Jason King	,	R/R
3	Derek Sneddon	1, 0, 0, 0, 0	1
4	Rene Bach	1, 3, 2, 6^, 2	14
5	Mark Lemon	3, 2, 3, 2, X	10
6	Dakota North	1, 2', 0, 0, 1', 1, 1	6+2
7	Adam McKinna	0, 0, 0, N	0
Manager: George English

Second leg

17 October 2010; 18.30	Newcastle Diamonds; Rene Bach 14+1	58 (101)–36 (89)	Sheffield Tigers; Ricky Ashworth 9	Newcastle Stadium

1	Kenni Larsen	3, 3, 3, 1, 3	13
2	Jason King	,	R/R
3	Derek Sneddon	2', 1, 1, 1, 3	8+1
4	Rene Bach	3, 3, 3, 3, 2'	14+1
5	Stuart Robson (guest)	3, X, 2', 3, 3	11+1
6	Dakota North	2', 3, X, N, N	5+1
7	Adam McKinna	3, 2', 1, 1, 0, 0	7+1
Manager: George English

1	Ricky Ashworth	X, 4^, 2, 2, 1	9
2	Hugh Skidmore	1, 2, 0, 2', 1'	6+2
3	Richard Hall	0, 2, 1, 2, 1', 0	6+1
4	Josef Franc	,	R/R
5	Josh Auty	1, 2, 4^, 0	7
6	Casper Wortmann (guest)	0, 0, 0, N	0
7	Simon Lambert	1, 0, 1', 3, 0, 1', 2	8+2
Manager: Eric Boocock

=== Promotion/relegation playoff ===
The promotion/relegation playoff was contested between the Newcastle Diamonds and the bottom Elite League team, Ipswich Witches. The Diamonds narrowly lost the first leg, by 44–46, despite leading at one point by 34-26 and missing regular riders Jason King, Mark Lemon and in-form reserve Dakota North. The Diamonds were heavily defeated at Ipswich by 64–32, leading to an aggregate defeat of 110–76.

First leg

24 October 2010; 18.30	report	Newcastle Diamonds; Kenni Larsen / Rene Bach 12	44–46	Ipswich Witches; Danny King 13	Newcastle Stadium; Referee(s): Chris During

1	Kenni Larsen	3, 3, 3, 2, 1	12
2	Jason King	,	R/R
3	Derek Sneddon	1, Fx, 1, 1, 1	4
4	Rene Bach	3, 3, 3, 3, 0	12
5	David Howe (guest)	3, 2, 3, 2, 1'	11+1
6	Jan Graversen (guest)	0, 1', 0, 0	1+1
7	Adam McKinna	2, 1, Fx, 1, 0, 0	4
Manager: George English

1	Scott Nicholls	2, 2, 3, 3, 2'	12+1
2	Chris Slabon	Fx, N, N, N	0
3	Danny King	2, 3, 2, 3, 3	13
4	Aleš Dryml Jr.	1', 0, 1', 1'	3+3
5	Robert Miśkowiak	Fx, N, N, N	0
6	Dawid Stachyra	3, Fx, 1', 2, 2, 2', 2	12+2
7	itchie Hawkins	1, 2, 2, F, 0, 1, 0	8+2
Manager:

Second leg

28 October 2010; 19.00	report	Ipswich Witches; Dawid Stachyra 12+2	64 (110)–32 (76)	Newcastle Diamonds; Kenni Larsen 13	Foxhall Stadium, Ipswich

1	Scott Nicholls	3, 3, 3, 2'	11+1
2	Chris Slabon	1, 2', 1', 2'	6+3
3	Danny King	3, 3, 1', 3	10+1
4	Aleš Dryml Jr.	2', 0, 2, 2'	6+2
5	Robert Miśkowiak	2', 2', 2, 3	9+2
6	Dawid Stachyra	2', 3, 1', 3, 3	12+2
7	Ritchie Hawkins	3, 3, 2, 1, 1	10
Manager:

1	Kenni Larsen	2, 2, 6^, 1, 2	13
2	Jason King	,	R/R
3	Chris Mills (guest)	0, 0, Fx, 0, 0	0
4	Rene Bach	1, 1, 1, R	3
5	Stuart Robson (guest)	1, 1, 6^, 3, 0, R	11
6	Simon Lambert (guest)	1, 0, 0, 2, 1	4
7	Adam McKinna	0, 0, 1', 0, 0	1+1
Manager: George English

== Young Shield ==
- End of season competition for the league teams finishing 5th to 12th

First Round

Team one	Team two	Score
Berwick	Newport	41–52, 41–55
Stoke	Workington	41–49, 26–64
Scunthorpe	Somerset	70–20, 29–65
King's Lynn	Rye House	49–41, 39–53

Semi-final

Team one	Team two	Score
Workington	Scunthorpe	61–35, 43–47
Newport	Rye House	49–47, 39–54

Final

Team one	Team two	Score
Rye House	Workington	55–35, 28–66

== Riders' Championship ==
Kenni Larsen won the Riders' Championship. The final was held on 26 September at Owlerton Stadium.

Placing	Rider	Total	1	2	3	4	5	6	7	8	9	10	11	12	13	14	15	16	17	18	19	20	Pts	Pos	21	22
1	(Denmark) (2) Kenni Larsen (ND)	13	3					3				3				2				2			13	2		3
2	(England) (7) David Howe (SS)	11		2					2					3	3					1			11	3	2	2
3	(United States) (3) Ryan Fisher (EDI)	11	2						1				2				3				3		11	4	3	1
4	(Denmark) (11) Rene Bach (ND)	13			3				3		3					3						1	13	1		0
5	(England) (9) Josh Auty (SHE)	10			X		1						3					3		3			10	5	1	
6	(Australia) (6) Travis McGowan (GLA)	9		3				2			1							2			1		9	6	0	
7	(England) (1) Leigh Lanham (NW)	7	1				3				0				0				3				7	7		
8	(England) (5) Lee Complin (BER)	7		1			0					2					1					3	7	8		
9	(Australia) (12) Cory Gathercole (SOM)	7			1					3		1			2						F		7	9		
10	(Australia) (16) Jason Lyons (BIR)	6				2				R	2						2			0			6	10		
11	(Australia) (4) Taylor Poole (STO)	6	0							1				2				1				2	6	11		
12	(Sweden) (8) Linus Sundstrom (RH)	6		0						2			1			1			2				6	12		
13	(England) (13) Gary Havelock (RED)	6				1	2							1		0					2		6	13		
14	(Czech Republic) (14) Tomas Topinka (KL)	4				3		0					0		1							0	4	14		
15	(Australia) (10) Rusty Harrison (WOR)	3			2			1						0			0		0				3	15		
16	(England) (15) Jordan Frampton (RH)	1				0			0			0						0	1				1	16		
Placing	Rider	Total	1	2	3	4	5	6	7	8	9	10	11	12	13	14	15	16	17	18	19	20	Pts	Pos	21	22

m - exclusion for exceeding two minute time allowance • t - exclusion for touching the tapes • x - other exclusion • e - retired or mechanical failure • f - fell • ns - non-starter • nc - non-classify

gate A - inside	gate B	gate C	gate D - outside

== Pairs ==
The Premier League Pairs Championship was held at Oaktree Arena on 9 July. The event was won by Sheffield Tigers.

Group A
Pos	Team	Pts	Riders
1	Birmingham	22	Lyons 11, Johnston 11
2	Somerset	20	Gathercole 10, Parker 10
3	Newcastle	20	Lemon 10, Larsen 10
4	King's Lynn	15	Doolan 10, Smith 5
5	Redcar	13	Sanchez 11, Wilson 2

Group B
Pos	Team	Pts	Riders
1	Sheffield	24	Auty 13, Ashworth 11
2	Glasgow	20	Gracjzonek 11, McGowan 9
3	Rye House	18	Neath 10, Frampton 8
4	Scunthorpe	18	Karlsson 13, Howe 5
5	Edinburgh	10	Fisher 5, Wolbert 5

Semi finals

- Birmingham bt Glasgow 6–3
- Sheffield bt Somerset 6–3

Final

- Sheffield bt Birmingham 7–2

== Fours ==
Birmingham Brummies won the Premier League Four-Team Championship, held on 15 August 2010, at the East of England Arena.

Group A
Pos	Team	Pts	Riders
1	Birmingham	14	Lyons 5, Sweetman 4, Summers 4, Johnston 1
2	Sheffield	13	Ashworth 5, Franc 4, Hall 3, Lambert 1
3	Newcastle	12	Lemon 6, Larsen 4, King 2, Bach 0
4	Berwick	9	Rymel 4, Complin 2, Makovsky 2, Clews 1

Group B
Pos	Team	Pts	Riders
1	Somerset	15	Parker 6, Masters 5, Hawkins 2, Gathercole 2
2	Edinburgh	14	Tully 5, Wethers 4, Fisher 3, Katajisto 2
3	Scunthorpe	14	Karlsson 4, Aarnio 4, Howe 3, Wilkinson 3
4	Rye House	5	Sundstrom 3, Neath 2, Ekberg 0, Kessler 0

Final
Pos	Team	Pts	Riders
1	Birmingham	25	Lyons 8, Sweetman 6, Summers 6, Johnston 5
2	Edinburgh	19	Fisher 8, Tully 4, Wethers 4, Katajisto 3
3	Somerset	15	Parker 6, Masters 5, Hawkins 2, Holder 2
4	Sheffield	13	Franc 7, Hall 4, Ashworth 2, Lambert 0

== Final leading averages ==
Rider	Team	Average
(United States) Ryan Fisher	Edinburgh	10.01
(Denmark) Kenni Larsen	Newcastle	10.00
(Sweden) Linus Sundström	Rye House	9.84
(Australia) Kevin Doolan	Kings Lynn	9.76
(Australia) Jason Lyons	Birmingham	9.58
(England) Joe Screen	Glasgow	9.49
(Denmark) René Bach	Newcastle	9.42
(Australia) Mark Lemon	Newcastle	9.38
(Sweden) Travis McGowan	Glasgow	9.33
(England) Oliver Allen	King's Lynn	8.36

== Riders & final averages ==
Berwick

- Adrian Rymel 8.66
- Marcin Rempała 8.57
- Michal Makovský 7.24
- Lee Complin 7.17
- Michał Rajkowski 6.55
- Paul Clews 6.46
- Craig Branney 5.62
- Jade Mudgway 4.69
- Anders Andersen 3.32

Birmingham

- Jason Lyons 9.58
- Chris Kerr 8.51
- Steve Johnston 8.49
- Richard Sweetman 8.37
- Aaron Summers 7.76
- Justin Sedgmen 7.40
- Klaus Jakobsen 5.04
- Kyle Newman 4.79
- Jake Anderson 2.63

Edinburgh

- Ryan Fisher 10.01
- Kevin Wolbert 8.53
- Matthew Wethers 8.18
- Kalle Katajisto 7.86
- Andrew Tully 7.78
- William Lawson 5.66
- Tobias Busch 4.88
- József Tabaka 4.46
- Max Dilger 2.93
- Arlo Bugeja 2.36
- Ashley Morris 2.36
- Cal McDade 2.09

Glasgow

- Joe Screen 9.49
- Travis McGowan 9.33
- James Grieves 7.94
- Josh Grajczonek 7.57
- Nick Morris 5.47
- John Branney 5.14
- Lee Dicken 4.42
- Jamie Courtney 3.16
- Jake Anderson 2.98
- Mitchell Davey 2.69

King's Lynn

- Kevin Doolan 9.76
- Oliver Allen 8.72
- Tomáš Topinka 8.21
- Joe Haines 7.32
- Linus Eklöf 7.29
- Kozza Smith 6.92
- Lasse Bjerre 6.71
- Chris Mills 5.97
- Casper Wortmann 5.47
- Adam Roynon 5.24
- Darren Mallett 4.85
- Cal McDade 2.45

Newcastle

- Kenni Larsen 10.00
- René Bach 9.42
- Mark Lemon 9.38
- Jason King 6.72
- Derek Sneddon 5.67
- Dakota North 5.40
- Adam McKinna 3.29
- Anders Andersen 2.54

Newport

- Leigh Lanham 8.30
- Kyle Legault 7.92
- Kim Nilsson 7.45
- Craig Watson 7.14
- Robin Aspegren 6.25
- Anders Mellgren 5.35
- Alex Davies 5.30
- Todd Kurtz 4.88

Redcar

- Gary Havelock 8.32
- Emiliano Sanchez 7.12
- Ben Wilson 6.56
- James Grieves 6.27
- Maks Gregorič 5.45
- Peter Juul 5.45
- Tomáš Suchánek 5.19
- Stuart Swales 5.04
- Henning Bager 4.69
- Jan Graversen 4.50
- Charles Wright 4.39

Rye House

- Linus Sundström 9.84
- Jordan Frampton 8.26
- Chris Neath 7.68
- Stefan Ekberg 6.95
- Luke Bowen 6.05
- Kyle Hughes 5.60
- Kurt Shields 4.00
- Robbie Kessler 3.40
- Lee Strudwick 2.38
- Paul Starke 2.27

Scunthorpe

- David Howe 8.38
- Magnus Karlsson 8.06
- Carl Wilkinson 7.57
- Tero Aarnio 6.91
- Joel Parsons 6.91
- Viktor Bergström 5.57
- Jerran Hart 5.17
- Jan Graversen 4.63
- Simon Lambert 4.04

Sheffield

- Ricky Ashworth 8.28
- Josh Auty 8.23
- Richard Hall 7.32
- Josef Franc 7.29
- Hugh Skidmore 6.36
- Paul Cooper 5.90
- Simon Lambert 5.16
- Arlo Bugeja 3.35

Somerset

- Shane Parker 8.40
- Cory Gathercole 7.75
- Sam Masters 7.17
- Ritchie Hawkins 6.50
- Christian Hefenbrock 6.00
- James Holder 5.15
- Luboš Tomíček Jr. 4.65
- Mark Baseby 2.52
- Kyle Howarth 1.94

Stoke

- Claus Vissing 7.39
- Lee Smart 6.66
- Taylor Poole 6.45
- Hynek Štichauer 6.45
- Luboš Tomíček Jr. 6.02
- Ricky Wells 5.98
- Klaus Jakobsen 5.73
- Ben Wilson 5.48
- Jan Graversen 5.45
- James Holder 3.73
- Frank Facher 3.52
- Michal Rajkowski 3.33
- Jeremia Thelaus 1.78

Workington

- Rusty Harrison 7.69
- Chris Schramm 7.54
- Craig Cook 7.47
- Peter Kildemand 7.27
- Andre Compton 6.97
- Richard Lawson 6.63
- John Branney 6.05
- Kenny Ingalls 5.81
- Casper Wortmann 5.75

== See also ==
- List of United Kingdom Speedway League Champions
- Knockout Cup (speedway)
