= 2007 British Speedway Championship =

Seasons
- ← 2006 2008 →

The 2007 British Speedway Championship was the 47th edition of the British Speedway Championship. The Final took place on 4 June at Monmore Green in Wolverhampton, England. The Championship was won by Chris Harris, who beat David Howe, Scott Nicholls and Edward Kennett in the final heat.

== British Final ==
- 4 June 2007
- (England) Monmore Green Stadium, Wolverhampton

=== Qualifying ===
Pos.	Rider	Points	Details
1	Chris Harris	14	(3,3,3,3,2)
2	David Howe	14	(2,3,3,3,3)
3	Scott Nicholls	13	(2,3,2,3,3)
4	Edward Kennett	13	(3,3,2,3,2)
5	Daniel King	9	(3,2,2,2,0)
6	Oliver Allen	9	(1,2,1,2,3)
7	Lewis Bridger	8	(2,2,1,0,3)
8	Simon Stead	8	(3,1,2,1,1)
9	Chris Louis	7	(0,1,3,1,2)
10	Lee Richardson	7	(1,0,3,2,1)
11	Joe Screen	4	(1,2,1,0)
12	Gary Havelock	4	(0,1,1,2,0)
13	Richard Hall	4	(2,1,0,0,1)
14	James Wright	3	(0,0,0,1,2)
15	William Lawson	3	(1,0,0,1,1)
16	Tai Woffinden	0	(0)
17	Ben Wilson	0	(0,0,0)
18	Adam Roynon	0	(0,0)

=== Semi-final ===
Pos.	Rider	Points
1	Edward Kennett	3
2	Scott Nicholls	2
3	Daniel King	1
4	Oliver Allen	U

=== Final heat ===
Pos.	Rider	Points
Gold	Chris Harris	3
Silver	David Howe	2
Bronze	Scott Nicholls	1
4	Edward Kennett	0

== Under 21 final ==
Edward Kennett won the British Speedway Under 21 Championship for the second time. The final was held at Arlington Stadium, Hailsham on 28 April.

Pos.	Rider	Points	SF	Final
1	Edward Kennett	14	x	3
2	William Lawson	10	2	2
3	Tai Woffinden	12	3	1
4	Ben Barker	12	x	0
5	Lewis Bridger	12	1	
6	Danny King	11	0	
7	Adam Roynon	9		
8	Steve Boxall	8		
9	Ben Wilson	7		
10	James Wright	4		
11	Lee Smart	4		
12	Jamie Courtney	4		
13	Mark Baseby	3		
14	Nicki Glanz	3		
15	Luke Bowen	3		
16	Josh Auty	1		
