= Birmingham Brummies =

British motorcycle speedway team

Club information
- Track address: Perry Barr Stadium
- Country: England
- Founded: 1928
- Closed: 2025
- Website: www.birmingham-speedway.com

Club facts
- Colours: Yellow & Red
- Track size: 292 metres (319 yd)
- Track record time: 56.6 seconds
- Track record date: 25 June 2008 & 2 July 2008
- Track record holder: Jason Lyons & Kevin Doolan

Major team honours
Division Two Champions	1974, 1975
Division Two National Trophy Winners	1948
Division Two KO Cup	1974
Division Two Pairs	2009
Division Two Fours	2010
Division 2 Anniversary Cup Winners	1948
Midland Cup winners	1953, 1954, 1955
Division Three Champions	2015, 2016
Division Three Fours	2015

Birmingham Brummies were a British speedway team founded in 1928. They were inaugural members of the Southern League in 1929. The team have twice finished runner-up in the highest tier of British speedway, during the 1952 Speedway National League and 2013 Elite League speedway season. After four years in the National League, in 2019 they moved up to the second tier of British speedway in the SGB Championship. In 2024 the Brummies moved up again to the highest tier, the SGB Premiership. The club closed at the end of the 2025 season due to redevelopment of their Perry Barr Stadium.

== History ==
=== 1928–1930 ===
The city of Birmingham had two teams in the Southern League of the inaugural season of British speedway in 1929. One was based at the (old Perry Barr stadium) and the other was based at Hall Green Stadium. The Perry Barr based team withdrew from the 1930 league season and had their results expunged. The Hall Green team, known as Birmingham Bulldogs fared a little better but closed in 1938.

=== 1947–1953 ===
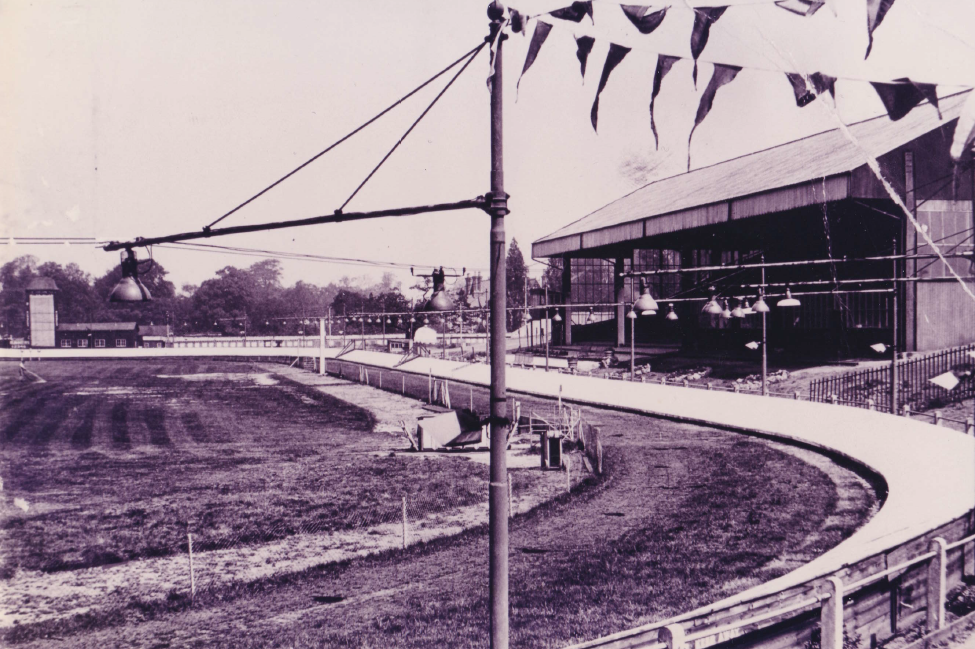
The old Perry Barr Stadium, Walsall Road c.1950

Birmingham first raced league speedway as the Brummies during the 1946 Speedway Northern League, finishing in a respectable 4th place, but the season was marred by the death of their Canadian rider Charlie Appleby in a crash at Brough Park. The Brummies continued to race and experienced success in 1948, when they won the division 2 National Trophy, during the 1948 season. In 1949 they competed in the highest league for the first time and in 1952 finished runner-up to Wembley Lions.

Birmingham raced in the top division until the August of the 1957 Speedway National League season, when they withdrew and were replaced by the Bradford Tudors. The promoter Leslie Marshall quoted financial issues and decreasing attendances and the ban of two riders Ron Mountford and Eric Boothroyd for riding in South Africa.

=== 1970s ===
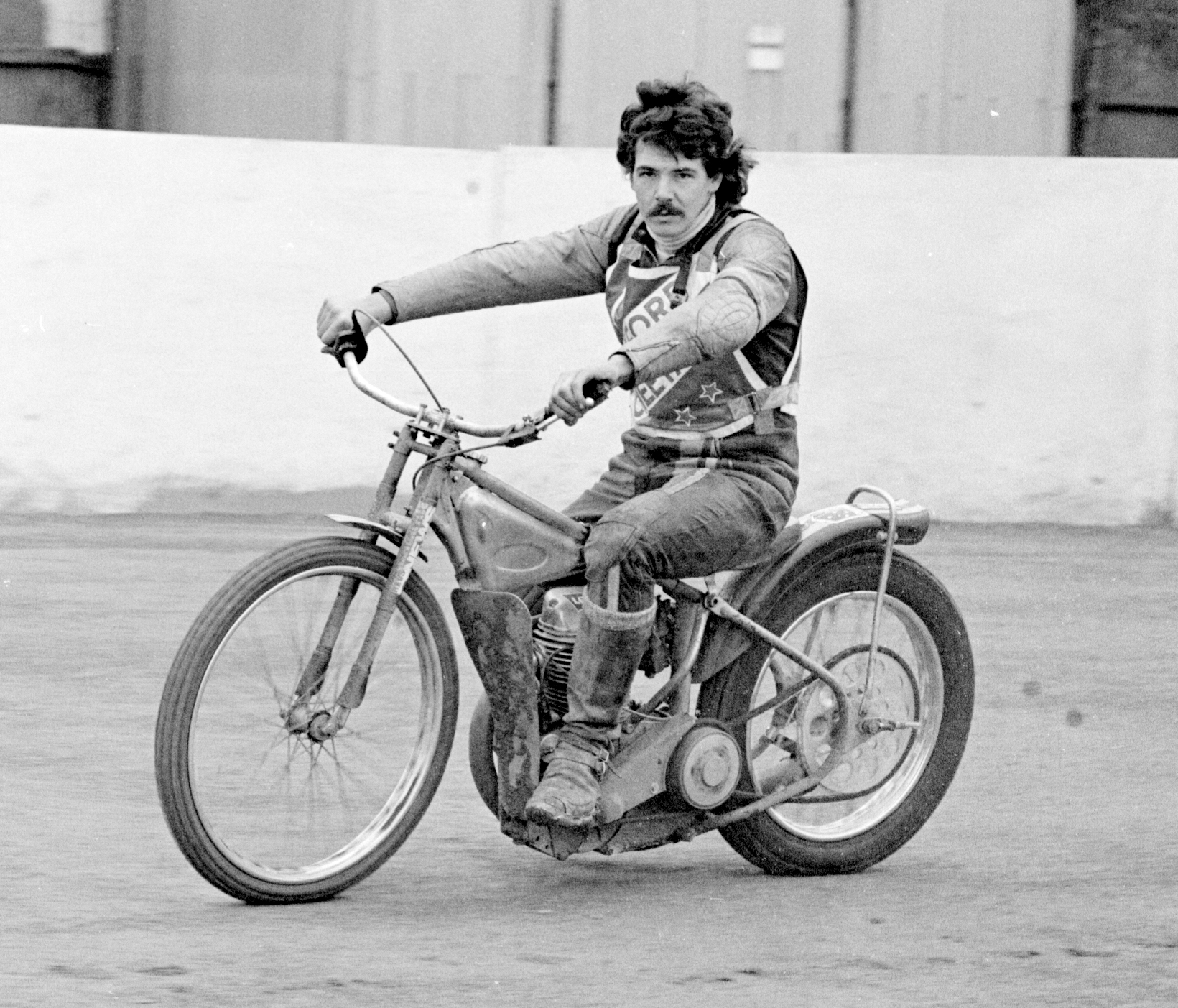
Carl Askew was with Birmingham during the title winning 1974 and 1975 seasons.

The Brummies reopened at Perry Barr for the 1971 British League Division Two season. In 1974 and 1975, the club gained silverware, winning the league and KO Cup double in 1974 and then successfully defending their league title in 1975. The 1974 team included Phil Herne and Arthur Browning who both recorded season averages above 10 and finished first and third respectively in the league averages. They were strongly supported by John Hart and George Major. The team lost Herne to Newport in 1975 but Birmingham still managed to successfully defend their title with Alan Grahame improving his average significantly.

It would be their greatest period of success at the old Perry Barr stadium and resulted in the team moving to the top division for 1976. The first five seasons in the division were a struggle, with a best place finish of 14th.

=== 1980s ===
In 1981, Birmingham signed a Dane called Hans Nielsen from Wolves. He helped the team improve to 6th place and a cup final before repeating the 6th place finish again in 1982. Despite Nielsen topping the 1983 league averages, he lacked support with the exception of Alan Grahame and Birmingham's last season at the old perry Barr Stadium ended with a 9th place finish. The stadium closed for good by the Spring of 1984 and the Brummies were left without a home.

A home was found at the Wheels Project in Bordesley Green in 1985 and the team raced for two seasons in the National League before closing after at the end of the 1986 season. The last home fixture was on 26 September 1986.

Although Birmingham did win trophies during their initial spell in Speedway these achievements were often dwarfed by the success of fellow West Midlands Speedway teams, the Wolverhampton Wolves, Coventry Bees and Cradley Heathens.

=== 2000s ===
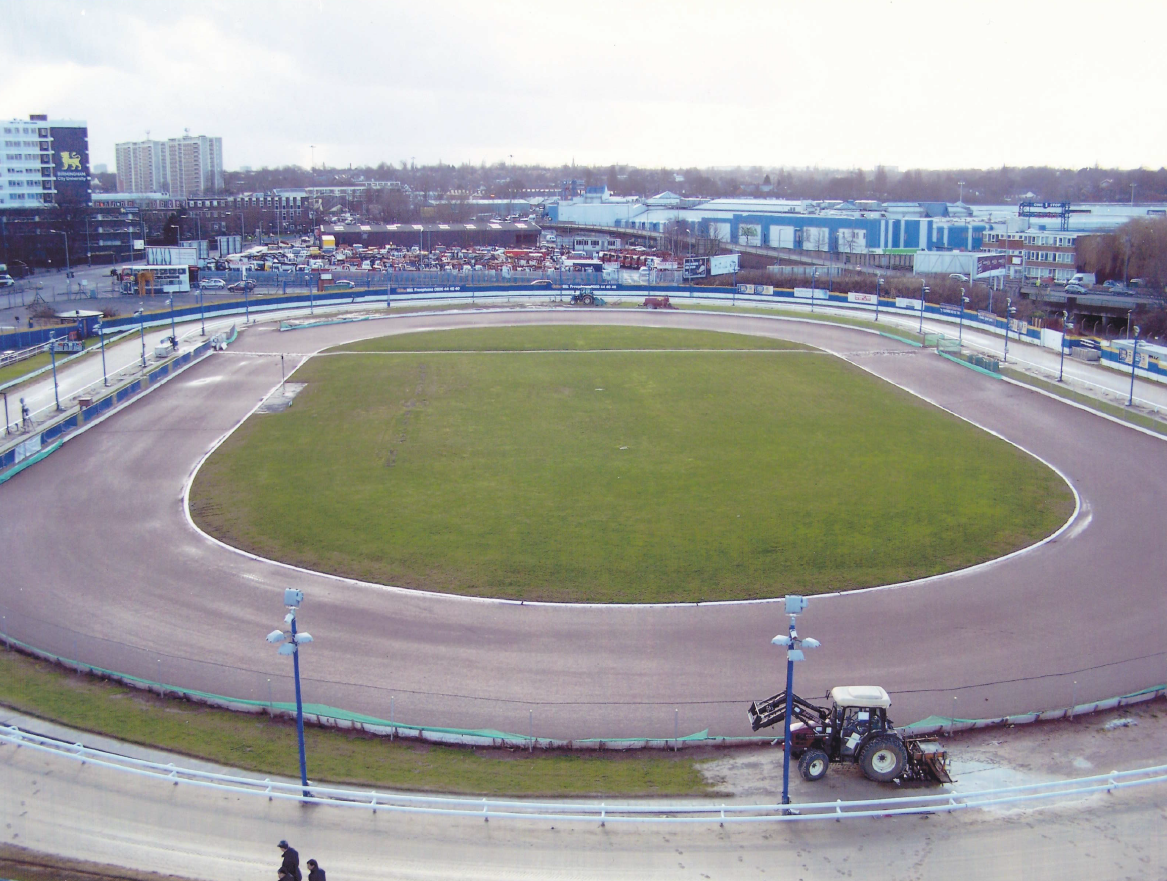
Birmingham returned in 2006, racing at Perry Barr.

After twenty years away from the sport Birmingham were reformed in 2006 and then accepted into the Premier League in 2007. The first meeting of the new era, the Alan Hunt Memorial, took place on 21 March 2007 at Perry Barr Stadium. In a successful first season the team finished in second place in the league table, and runner-up in both the Premier Trophy and the Young Shield, despite having only two members of their own team actually fit to ride. During the majority of their time in the Premier League they were captained by Australian Jason Lyons who went on to become extremely popular at the club and is now a member of the club's Hall of Fame. The club when re founded was sponsored by Richard Meredith of Mercom Water Products.

=== 2010s ===
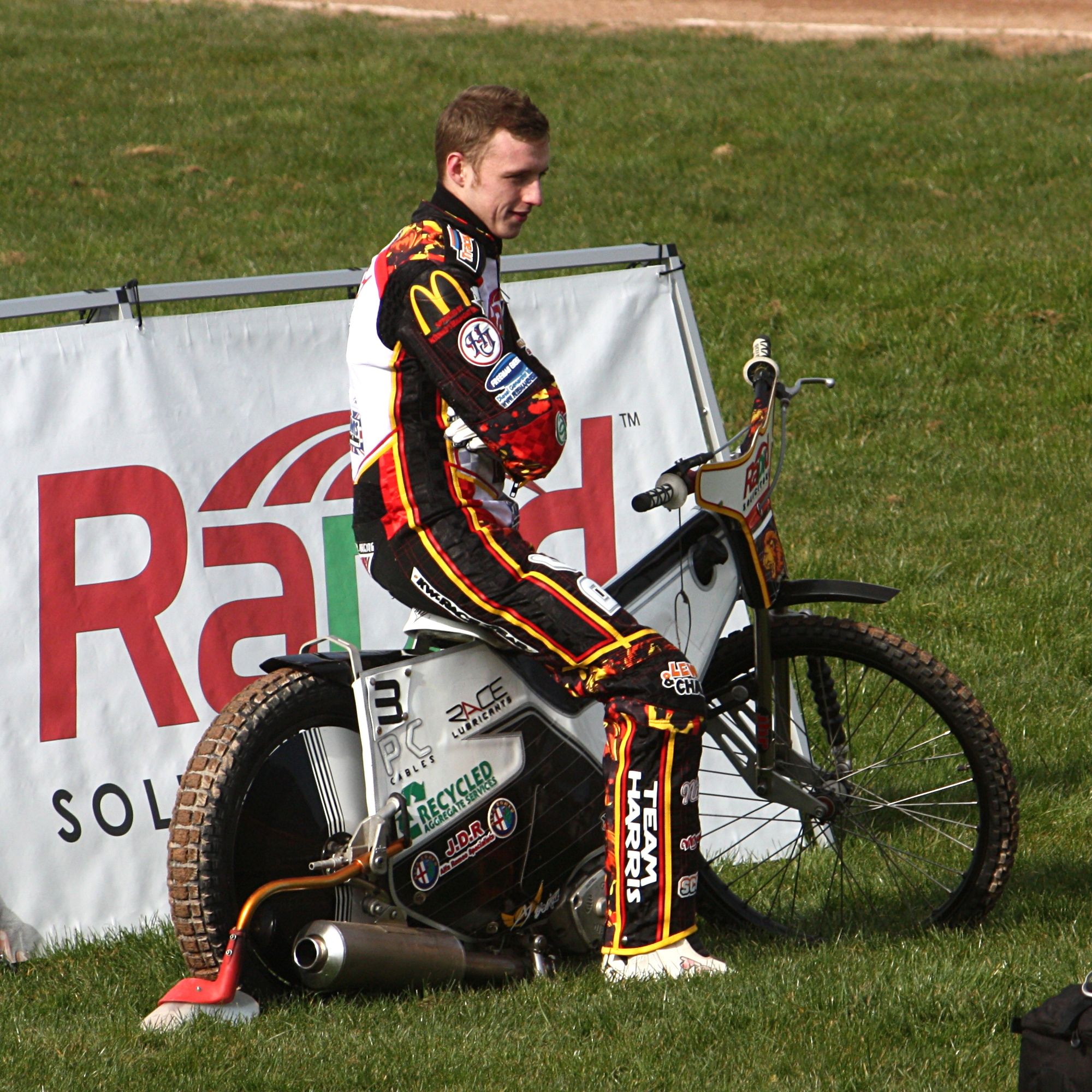
Tom Perry won two National league titles with Birmingham in 2015 and 2016.

Birmingham were accepted into the Elite League for 2011 and finished their first season in ninth place out of ten. Ahead of their second season in the top flight they retained the services of the previous season's star performers Danny King and Ben Barker as well as adding Speedway Grand Prix star Bjarne Pedersen. Although Pedersen's time at Birmingham was an unhappy one the team made a big improvement on their first season in the Elite League, finishing in 3rd place and achieving a spot in the play-offs. The 2013 season was filled with success, with the Brummies finishing in first place in the Elite League and achieving a place in the Elite League Grand Final. However, despite being led by Jason Doyle and Chris Harris, they found themselves outclassed in the final, losing out on aggregate 104-79 to the Poole Pirates, who were inspired by Greg Hancock.

Despite the success of the 2013 season there were regular reports of turmoil behind the scenes at the club, and at the end of the season team manager Phil Morris walked away from the club. The off season was a difficult time for the club, with captain Danny King handing in a transfer request, although he was later convinced to stay. Once the season began the troubles only intensified, and on 14 July 2014 it was announced that the club would cease to operate. The team was taken over later that year by Tony Mole and entered into the National League (the third tier) for 2015. Under the stewardship of Mole and Drury, the Brummies would crown a superb season back on track by winning the National League title. The Brummies defended their National League title in 2016, beating Eastbourne in a two leg play off and would also win the National Trophy to crown a superb double.

Ahead of the 2017 season owner Tony Mole announced that he will be walking away from the sport after the 2017 season, after 31 years promoting in the sport. The Birmingham Brummies had their future secured when they were bought by David and Peter Mason toward the end of the 2017 season. The team moved up to the SGB Championship (2nd tier) in 2019.

=== 2020s ===
On 7 December 2021, an announcement was made that Nigel Tolley would purchase the club from outgoing owners David and Peter Mason, which ensured the Brummies would continue racing in 2022. On 17 November 2023, it was announced that the Brummies would return to the top-flight for the first time in a decade joining the 2024 Premiership season. Nigel Tolley revealed the decision was made as Perry Barr would only be available for Monday night racing making the Premiership the only option.

In May 2025 Tolley announced that the Brummies would close at the end of the season due to the closure and redevelopment for housing of Perry Barr Stadium, by West Midlands developer Corbally Group. They rode for the final time at home on 25 August 2025 losing 58–32 to the Leicester Lions and for the last time on 28 August.

== Season summary (1st team) ==
Extended content

Year and league	Position	Notes
1929 Speedway Southern League	9th	
1930 Speedway Southern League	N/A	withdrew and record expunged
1946 Speedway Northern League	4th	
1947 Speedway National League Division Two	4th	
1948 Speedway National League Division Two	2nd	National Trophy Div 2 winners
1949 Speedway National League	7th	
1950 Speedway National League	8th	
1951 Speedway National League	5th	
1952 Speedway National League	2nd	
1953 Speedway National League	3rd	
1954 Speedway National League	8th	
1955 Speedway National League	5th	
1956 Speedway National League	3rd	
1957 Speedway National League	N/A	withdrew, replaced by Bradford Tudors
1971 British League Division Two season	11th	
1972 British League Division Two season	6th	
1973 British League Division Two season	5th	
1974 British League Division Two season	1st	Div 2 champions & Div 2 Knockout Cup winners
1975 New National League season	1st	Div 2 champions
1976 British League season	18th	
1977 British League season	18th	
1978 British League season	18th	
1979 British League season	14th	
1980 British League season	14th	
1981 British League season	6th	
1982 British League season	6th	
1983 British League season	9th	
1985 National League season	14th	
1986 National League season	17th	
2007 Premier League speedway season	5th+	
2008 Premier League speedway season	12th	
2009 Premier League speedway season	4th	
2010 Premier League speedway season	3rd	
2011 Elite League speedway season	9th	
2012 Elite League speedway season	3rd	
2013 Elite League speedway season	1st	PO Final
2014 Elite League speedway season	N/A	withdrew, results expunged
2015 National League speedway season	1st	Div 3 champions
2016 National League speedway season	1st	Div 3 champions
2017 National League speedway season	6th	
2018 National League speedway season	5th+	
SGB Championship 2019	11th	
SGB Championship 2021	7th	
SGB Championship 2022	10th	
SGB Championship 2023	7th	
SGB Premiership 2024	7th	
SGB Premiership 2025	7th	

+5th place at time of cut off

== Season summary (juniors) ==
Extended content

Year and league	Position	Notes
2025 National Trophy	tbc	Bulls

== Notable riders ==
- (England) Carl Askew
- (England) Steve Bastable
- (England) Geoff Bennett
- (England) Nigel Boocock
- (England) Eric Boothroyd
- (England) Arthur Browning
- (New Zealand) Bruce Cribb
- (England) Stan Dell
- (Australia) Jason Doyle
- (England) Alan Grahame
- (England) Andy Grahame
- (England) John Hart
- (Australia) Phil Herne
- (England) Alan Hunt
- (England) Danny King
- (Czech Republic) Zdeněk Kudrna
- (United States) Wilbur Lamoreaux
- (Australia) Jason Lyons
- (England) George Major
- (England) Ron Mountford
- (Denmark) Hans Nielsen
- (Australia) Arthur Payne
- (Australia) Billy Sanders
- (Sweden) Sören Sjösten
- (Australia) Graham Warren
- (England) Ray Wilson

== Riders previous seasons ==
Extended content

2007 team

- (Australia) Jason Lyons
- (Italy) Emiliano Sanchez
- (Denmark) Henning Bager
- (Denmark) Henrik Moller
- (England) Lee Smart
- (Austria) Manuel Hauzinger
- (Australia) Ben Powell
- (England) Jack Roberts (Number 8)

Also rode

- (United States) Brent Werner
- (England) Aidan Collins
- (England) Jon Armstrong
- (Denmark) Ulrich Ostergaard

2008 team

- (Australia) Jason Lyons
- (Canada) Kyle Legault
- (Poland) Tomasz Piszcz
- (Australia) Jay Herne
- (England) James Cockle
- (Australia) Craig Watson
- (England) Jack Roberts

Also rode

- (England) Jack Hargreaves
- (England) Adam Roynon
- (England) James Birkinshaw
- (England) Lee Smart
- (Wales) Phil Morris

2009 team

- (Australia) Jason Lyons
- (Poland) Tomasz Piszcz
- (Sweden) Ludvig Lindgren
- (Australia) Robert Ksiezak
- (England) Jay Herne
- (Australia) Richard Sweetman
- (England) Lee Smart

Also rode

- (Poland) Marek Mroz
- (England) Ben Taylor
- (England) Daniel Halsey
- (England) James Cockle
- (Austria) Manuel Hauzinger

2010 team

- (Australia) Jason Lyons
- (Australia) Steve Johnston
- (Australia) Richard Sweetman
- (Australia) Justin Sedgmen
- (United States) Chris Kerr
- (Australia) Aaron Summers
- (Australia) Jake Anderson

Also rode

- (Denmark) Klaus Jakobsen
- (England) Kyle Newman

2011 team

- (Poland) Krzysztof Kasprzak
- (Czech Republic) Aleš Dryml, Jr.
- (Sweden) Daniel Nermark
- (England) Ben Barker
- (England) Danny King
- (Germany) Kevin Wolbert
- (Netherlands) Theo Pijper

Also rode

- (Denmark) Claus Vissing
- (Denmark) Rene Bach
- (Denmark) Ulrich Ostergaard
- (England) Joe Screen
- (England) James Wright

2012 team

- (Denmark) Bjarne Pedersen
- (Germany) Martin Smolinski
- (England) Danny King
- (England) Ben Barker
- (Poland) Sebastian Ułamek
- (England) Josh Auty
- (Poland) Tomasz Piszcz

Also rode

- (Italy) Nicolas Covatti
- (England) Chris Mills
- (England) Ricky Ashworth
- (England) Joe Screen

2013 team

- (England) Chris Harris
- (England) Josh Auty
- (England) Danny King
- (England) Ben Barker
- (Australia) Jason Doyle
- (Germany) Martin Smolinski
- (Italy) Nicolas Covatti

2014 team

- (England) Danny King
- (Poland) Adam Skornicki
- (England) Ben Barker
- (Sweden) Daniel Nermark
- (England) Edward Kennett
- (England) Paul Starke
- (England) Simon Lambert

Also rode

- (Italy) Nicolas Covatti
- (Poland) Bartosz Zmarzlik

2015 team

- (England) Adam Ellis
- (England) Tom Perry
- (England) Sam Chapman
- (England) Adam Kirby
- (England) Zach Wajtknecht
- (England) Alex Wilson
- (England) Harvie Banks

Also rode

- (England) Josh Bates
- (England) Robert Parker

2016 team

- (England) Zach Wajtknecht
- (England) Tom Perry
- (England) Darryl Ritchings
- (England) Tom Bacon
- (England) Jack Parkinson-Blackburn
- (England) Jack Smith
- (England) Danyon Hume

2017 team

- (England) Jack Parkinson-Blackburn
- (England) Layne Cupitt
- (England) David Mason
- (England) Tom Bacon
- (England) Liam Carr
- (England) Kyle Roberts
- (England) Taylor Hampshire

Also rode

- (England) Danyon Hume
- (England) Darryl Ritchings
- (England) Chris Hay
- (England) Macauley Leek
- (England) Kean Dicken

2018 team

- (England) Tom Bacon
- (England) Mitchell Davey
- (England) Danyon Hume
- (England) Callum Walker
- (England) Layne Cupitt
- (England) Leon Flint
- (England) Arran Butcher

2019 team

- (Denmark) Ulrich Østergaard
- (England) Kyle Newman
- (England) Ashley Morris
- (England) Zach Wajtknecht
- (Denmark) Tobias Thomsen
- (England) James Shanes
- (Italy) Michele Paco Castagna

2021 team

- (Italy) Michele Paco Castagna
- (England) Chris Harris
- (Germany) Valentin Grobauer
- (England) Ashley Morris
- (Germany) Erik Riss
- (England) James Shanes
- (England) Jack Thomas

2022 team

- (England) Josh Auty
- (England) Ashley Morris (C)
- (Denmark) Stefan Nielsen
- (Australia) James Pearson
- (England) James Shanes
- (Australia) Justin Sedgmen
- (Denmark) Claus Vissing

Also Rode

- (England) Ben Morley
- (England) Adam Ellis

== Club honours ==
- Division 2 Anniversary Cup Winners - 1948
- Division 2 National Trophy Winners - 1948
- Midland Cup - 1953, 1954, 1955
- British League Division 2 Champions - 1974
- British League Division 2 Knock-Out Cup - 1974
- National League Champions - 1975
- Midland Shield - 2007
- Premier League Pairs - 2009
- Premier League Fours - 2010
- National League Fours - 2015
- National League Champions - 2015, 2016
- National Trophy Winners - 2016

== See also ==
- Category:Birmingham Brummies riders
