= Graham Warren =

Australian speedway rider

- Graham Warren in 1953
- Born: 16 August 1925; Suva, Fiji
- Died: 5 October 2004
- Nationality: Australian

Career history
- 1948-1953, 1955: Birmingham Brummies
- 1959-1960: Coventry Bees
- 1961-1963: Wolverhampton Wolves

Individual honours
- 1949: Queensland State Champion
- 1950: Tom Farndon Memorial winner
- 1953: Midland Riders Champion

Team honours
- 1948: Anniversary Cup (Div 2) winner
- 1948: National Trophy (Div 2) winner
- 1953, 1955, 1960: Midland Cup
- 1962: Provincial Northern League winner
- 1963: Provincial League Champion

Graham Warren (1926 in Suva, Fiji – 2005) was an international motorcycle speedway rider who finished third in the 1950 Speedway World Championship final and was a member of the Australian national speedway team.

== Career ==
Warren arrived in the UK in March 1948 and signed up with the Birmingham Brummies in the National League Division Two. The Brummies finished second and were promoted to National League Division One for the 1949 season. In sixty meetings that season, Warren was unbeaten by an opponent in twenty five of them and averaged almost eleven points a match. In the May 1948, just two months after arriving in the UK for a trial with Birmingham, Warren was selected to ride for Australia. By 1949 he was the captain of his country. In 1949, despite being in a tougher division he still scored almost ten points a meeting and he qualified for his first World Final.

In 1949, Warren finished third in the Australian Championship and finished second a year later in 1950. Also in 1950, Warren qualified and finished in third place during the 1950 Individual Speedway World Championship. In early 1951, a severe accident at a meeting in New Zealand left Warren with a triple skull fracture and his career was never to hit the heights of 1950 again.

== World final appearances ==
- 1949 - (England) London, Wembley Stadium - 12th - 5pts
- 1950 - (England) London, Wembley Stadium - 3rd - 12pts
- 1952 - (England) London, Wembley Stadium - 13th - 5pts
- 1953 - (England) London, Wembley Stadium - 12th - 5pts
