= Wolverhampton Wolves =

British speedway team

Club information
- Track address: Monmore Green Stadium; Wolverhampton
- Country: England
- Founded: 1928/1951
- Closed: 2023
- Team manager: Peter Adams
- Website: www.wolverhampton-speedway.com

Club facts
- Colours: Old Gold and Black
- Track size: 264 metres (288.7 yd)
- Track record time: 52.69
- Track record date: 29 August 2016
- Track record holder: Niels Kristian Iversen

Major team honours
UK League Champions	1991, 1996, 2002; 2009, 2016
KO Cup Winners	1996
Div 2 League Champions	1963
Midland Cup	1973

Wolverhampton Wolves were a British motorcycle speedway team based in Wolverhampton, England. They were champions of the United Kingdom five times and raced at Monmore Green Stadium from 1928 to 2023.

== History ==
=== 1928–1930 ===
Speedway (known as Dirt Track racing at the time) was first held at Monmore Green Stadium on 30 May 1928. It was arranged by the Birmingham Motor Cycle Club, and the meeting consisted of several feature races. The first meeting to feature the Wolverhampton team name was an Inter–Town race against Manchester on 25 August. After a series of challenge matches during 1929 and 1930, speedway would not return to Wolverhampton for twenty years.

=== 1950s ===
During 1948 and the post-war optimism, record crowds were attending speedway events up and down the country. With towns keen to cash in on the boom, Wolverhampton's stadium owners applied to the local council for a track to be re-built at the original site. Australian Arthur Simcock set the ball rolling and was granted permission to promote a speedway in Wolverhampton and finally his dream came true on 14 October 1950. The first to test the new track were some visiting Norwich riders, en route to a meeting followed by Wulfrunians defeating Sheffield 58-26. Officially founded again in 1951, the team would ride as the Wolverhampton Wasps and they were admitted into the 1951 Speedway National League Division Three.

The winter of 1952/3 was a tumultuous one for speedway in the Black Country when Cradley Heathens merged with the Wasps 1953 season. Wolverhampton were pleased with this 'promotion' and at one meeting supporters were 'locked out' after the capacity was reached. It was reported 12,000 fans turned up with many more scaling the walls. This was however short lived and the team endured a series of poor results at the start of the 1954 season. A decision was made by the promotion and in early May of the same year, Wolverhampton closed its doors to speedway.

=== 1960s ===
It wasn't until the 1961 Provincial Speedway League, that the sport returned to the Monmore Green again. The team, now called the Wolverhampton Wolves completed two solid seasons before securing their first silverware, winning the 1963 Provincial Speedway League. The 1963 team consisted of three new signings Maury Mattingley, Dave Hemus and Rick France, who joined heat leaders Tommy Sweetman and Graham Warren to produce consistent results and win the league by two points from Stoke Potters.

From 1965, Wolverhampton competed in the inaugural British League, which was the clubs first season in the top tier of speedway. The team then recorded successive mid-table finishes before two poor seasons in 1968 and 1969.

=== 1970s ===
George Hunter with Gary Peterson

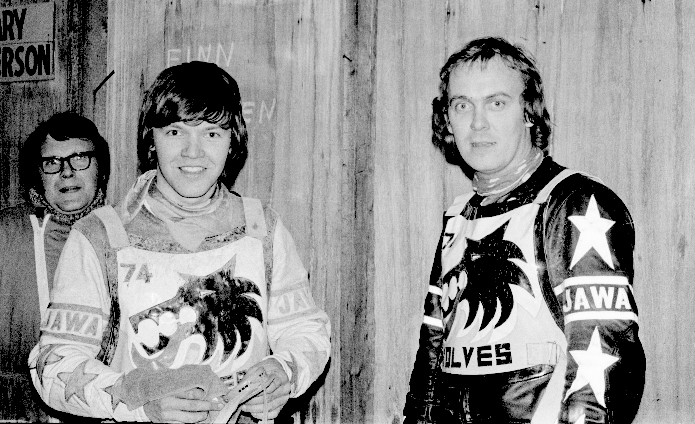
Finn Thomsen and Ole Olsen

Before the 1970 season, Wolves signed the Danish champion and one of the world's leading riders Ole Olsen. The Dane made an immediate impact, pushing Wolves up the table and winning the 1972 British League Riders' Championship.

In 1973, Wolves won the Midland Cup and the following year reached the final.

The 1975 season was overshadowed by the death of Gary Peterson, killed in the home leg of the Midland Cup final. Olsen then left after the 1975 season and Wolves spent the remainder of the decade battling in the lower half of the league table standings. However, one high point was the signing of Hans Nielsen in 1978, the 18-year-old Dane topped the team's averages in 1978 and 1979.

=== 1980s ===
Hans Nielsen continued to impress topping the league averages in 1980 but the team struggled and costs increased, resulting in promoter Mike Parker putting the riders on the transfer list and dropping down a division for the 1981 season. The promotion was taken over by Dan McCormick for the 1981 season before Mike Parker returned but he was unable to form a team and Wolves would not race for two seasons.

Promoter Peter Adams brought the team back for the 1984 season. Wolves signed Sam Ermolenko in 1986 and supported by a group of Danes and Americans, the team became hard to beat. A third place finish in 1986 was followed by a second place finish in 1989.

=== 1990s ===
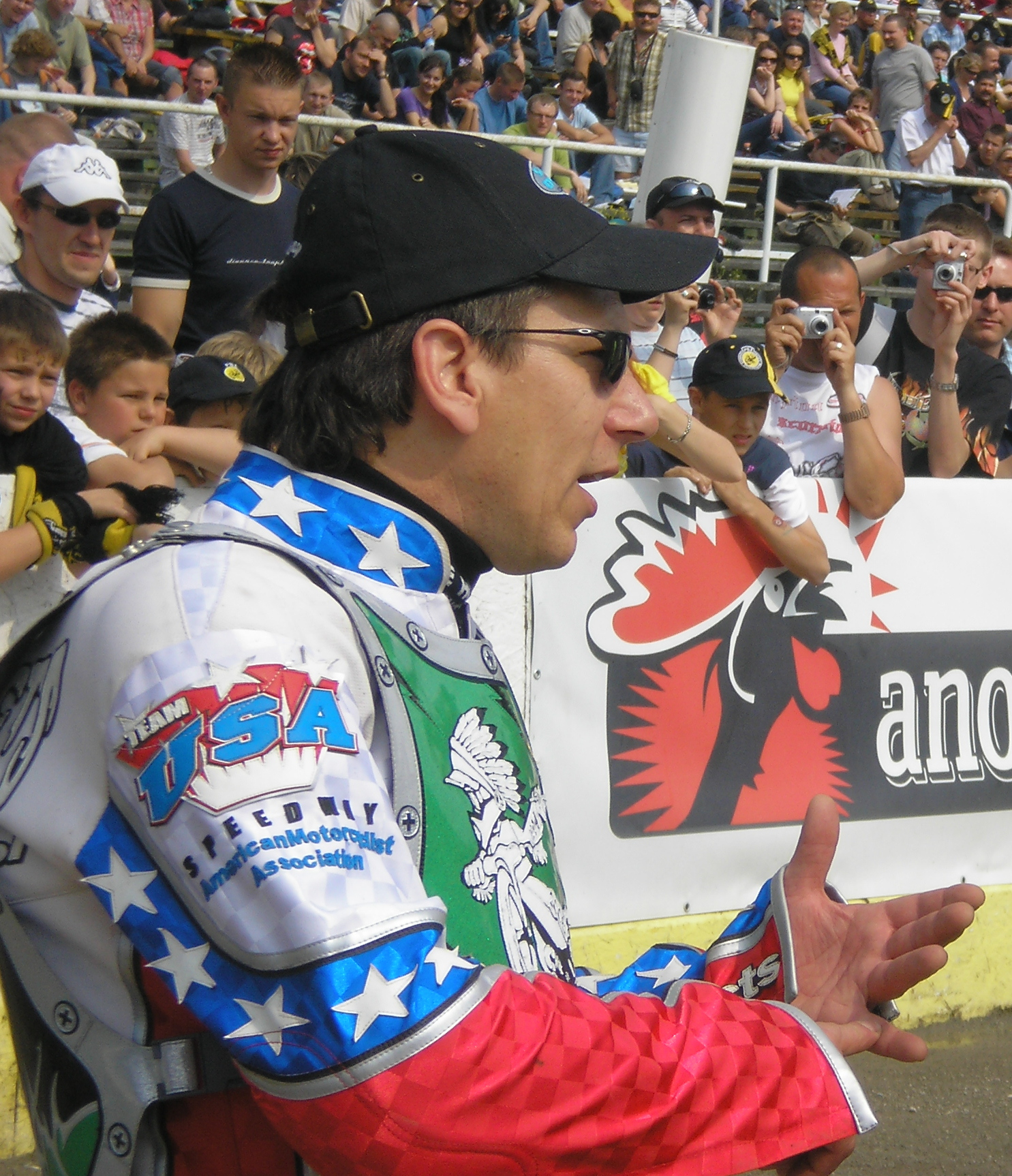
Sudden Sam Ermolenko

Wolves won their first highest league title (and second ever title) in 1991, after winning the 1991 British League season. They were led by their American star Sam Ermolenko, who became the first rider to push former Wolves rider Hans Nielsen from the top of the averages after eight consecutive years at the top. The Wolves team relied on two more American riders, Ronnie Correy and Sam's younger brother Charles Ermolenko, in addition to Englishman Graham Jones to seal the title from Bradford. The Wolves won the title for the second time in six years during the 1996 season, with Ronnie Correy being the sole survivor of the 1991 winning team. In a strange coincidence a new set of two brothers helped Wolves win the title, back in 1991 it was the Ermolenko brothers but now it was the Swedish Karlsson brothers. Peter Karlsson and Mikael Karlsson both scored heavily and ended the season with averages around the 10 mark.

=== 2000s ===
The Wolverhampton Wolves were the Sky Sports Elite League champions in 2002. Although they only finished 2nd in the regular season table they defeated Eastbourne Eagles in the play off final. It was Wolves third title success in 11 years and the Swedish Karlsson brothers, Peter and Mikael were once again integral to the Wolves team throughout the season. Two years later in 2004, Wolves lost in the play off final.

In 2008, Parry's International Travel signed a deal with owner Dave Parry (a former Wolves rider). The team was managed by Peter Adams and promoted by Chris Van Straaten. The decade ended with a second place finish in the league standings before regaining champion status in the 2009 season, beating the Swindon Robins 95-90 on aggregate in the 2009 play-offs. Freddie Lindgren was the star of the 2009 team but veteran Peter Karlsson and 19-year-old rider Tai Woffinden both scored heavily.

=== 2010s ===
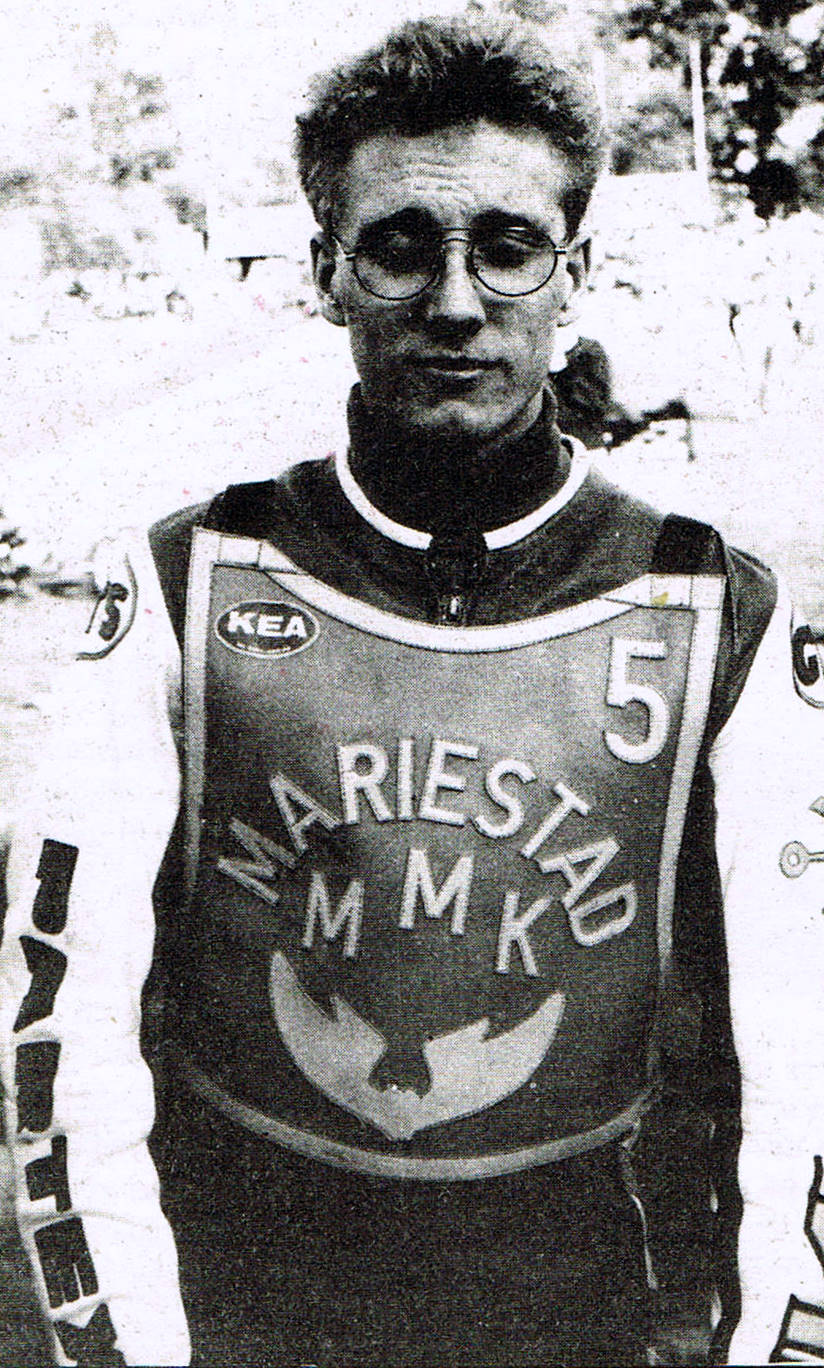
Peter Karlsson

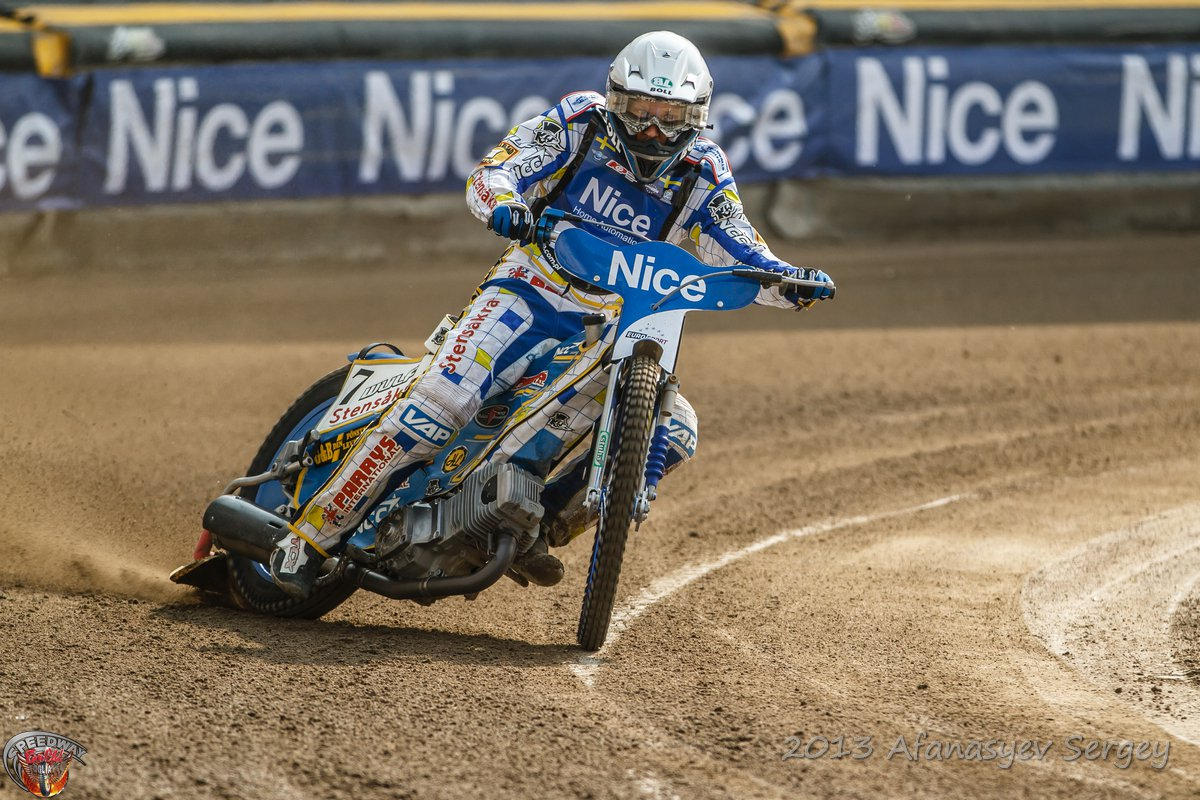
Freddie Lindgren

Another play-off final defeat ensued in 2010 and a third place finish was sealed in 2013. The team became champions of the United Kingdom for the fifth time in 2016, beating the top of the table finishing Belle Vue Aces. Led by Tai Woffinden and Freddie Lindgren, they won by an 18-point margin at home in the first leg by beating the Belle Vue Aces 54-36, the second leg was a win for Belle Vue of 50-42, meaning victory for the Wolves by a 10-point margin with the aggregate scores 96-86.

Wolves lost another play-off final in 2017 in extraordinary circumstances, having won the first leg against Swindon, away from home 47–43, they lost their home leg 47–42, with promoter Peter Adams gracious in defeat, stating that speedway was the winner.

=== 2020s ===
After the leagues were cancelled in 2020 due to the COVID-19 pandemic, the team finished 2nd and 4th respectively in 2021 and 2022 but were beaten in the play offs. In 2023, it was announced by the Monmore Green Stadium owners Entain that the venue would only be used by greyhound racing during 2024. The team disbanded after the 2023 season.

== Season summary ==
Extended content

Year and league	Position	Notes
1951 Speedway National League Division Three	10th	rode as the Wasps
1952 Speedway Southern League	4th	rode as the Wasps
1953 Speedway National League Division Two	7th	rode as the Wasps
1954 Speedway National League Division Two	n/a	withdrew
1961 Provincial Speedway League	9th	
1962 Provincial Speedway League	10th	
1963 Provincial Speedway League	1st	Champions
1964 Provincial Speedway League	3rd	
1965 British League season	7th	
1966 British League season	9th	
1967 British League season	8th	
1968 British League season	16th	
1969 British League season	16th	
1970 British League season	9th	
1971 British League season	12th	
1972 British League season	9th	
1973 British League season	7th	
1974 British League season	11th	
1975 British League season	13th	
1976 British League season	11th	
1977 British League season	15th	
1978 British League season	17th	
1979 British League season	11th	
1980 British League season	15th	
1981 National League season	13th	
1984 British League season	10th	
1985 British League season	10th	
1986 British League season	3rd	
1987 British League season	10th	
1988 British League season	8th	
1989 British League season	2nd	
1990 British League season	2nd	
1991 British League season	1st	Champions
1992 British League season	5th	
1993 British League season	2nd	
1994 British League season	3rd	
1995 Premier League speedway season	5th	
1996 Premier League speedway season	1st	Champions & Knockout Cup winners
1997 Elite League speedway season	7th	
1998 Elite League speedway season	6th	
1999 Elite League speedway season	10th	
2000 Elite League speedway season	6th	
2001 Elite League speedway season	8th	
2002 Elite League speedway season	2nd	Champions (won PO final)
2003 Elite League speedway season	5th	
2004 Elite League speedway season	2nd	PO final
2005 Elite League speedway season	8th	
2006 Elite League speedway season	6th	
2007 Elite League speedway season	6th	
2008 Elite League speedway season	9th	
2009 Elite League speedway season	2nd	Champions (won PO final)
2010 Elite League speedway season	2nd	PO final
2011 Elite League speedway season	8th	
2012 Elite League speedway season	9th	
2013 Elite League speedway season	3rd	PO semi final
2014 Elite League speedway season	7th	
2015 Elite League speedway season	7th	
2016 Elite League	3rd	Champions (won PO final)
SGB Premiership 2017	2nd	PO final
SGB Premiership 2018	6th	
SGB Premiership 2019	3rd	PO semi final
SGB Premiership 2021	2nd	PO semi final
SGB Premiership 2022	4th	PO semi finals
SGB Premiership 2023	2nd	PO semi finals

== Riders previous seasons ==
Extended content

1975 team

- (Denmark) Ole Olsen
- (Denmark) Finn Thomsen
- (Scotland) George Hunter
- (England) Colin Meredith
- (New Zealand) Gary Peterson
- (England) Malcolm Shakespeare

2004 team

- (Sweden) Mikael Max
- (England) Simon Stead
- (England) James Grieves
- (England) David Howe
- (United States) Sam Ermolenko
- (Sweden) Daniel Nermark
- (Poland) Adam Skornicki
- (Sweden) Fredrik Lindgren
- (England) Chris Neath

2005 team

- (Sweden) Fredrik Lindgren
- (England) David Howe
- (Sweden) Magnus Karlsson
- (Poland) Krzystof Pecyna
- (Sweden) Mikael Max
- (United States) Ronnie Correy
- (Australia) Steve Johnston

2006 team

- (Sweden) Peter Karlsson
- (Sweden) Fredrik Lindgren
- (United States) Billy Hamill
- (Sweden) Magnus Karlsson
- (Scotland) William Lawson
- (Germany) Christian Hefenbrock
- (United States) Ronnie Correy
- (England) Ben Wilson

2007 team

- (Sweden) Peter Karlsson
- (Sweden) Fredrik Lindgren
- (United States) Billy Hamill
- (England) David Howe
- (Sweden) Magnus Karlsson
- (Denmark) Kenneth Hansen
- (Scotland) William Lawson
- (England) Carl Wilkinson
- (United States) Chris Kerr (No.8)

Also Rode:

- (Netherlands) Theo Pijper
- (Scotland) James Grieves

2008 team

- (Sweden) Fredrik Lindgren
- (Denmark) Niels Kristian Iversen
- (England) David Howe
- (Denmark) Jesper B. Monberg
- (Denmark) Morten Risager
- (Sweden) Ludvig Lindgren
- (Denmark) Nicolai Klindt
- (United Kingdom) Chris Neath (No.8)

Also Rode:

- (Germany) Christian Hefenbrock
- (Denmark) Kenneth Hansen
- (Czech Republic) Aleš Dryml, Jr.

2009 team

- (Sweden) Peter Karlsson
- (Sweden) Fredrik Lindgren
- (England) Tai Woffinden
- (Poland) Adam Skórnicki
- (Denmark) Nicolai Klindt
- (Czech Republic) Hynek Stichauer
- (United States) Chris Kerr ^{‡}
- (Australia) Ty Proctor ^{‡}
- (Denmark) Jesper Kristiansen (No.8)

Also Rode:

- (England) Joe Haines (No.8) ^{†}

^{‡} Doubling-up between Premier and Elite League.
^{†} Sustained a neck injury during an individual event in May 2009.

2010 team

- (Sweden) Fredrik Lindgren
- (England) Tai Woffinden
- (Denmark) Nicolai Klindt
- (England) Joe Screen ^{AS}
- (Sweden) Ludvig Lindgren
- (Australia) Tyron Proctor
- (England) Joe Haines ^{‡}
- (United States) Chris Kerr ^{‡}
- (England) Richard Lawson (No.8)
- (Poland) Adam Skornicki
- (Australia) Matthew Wethers^{‡}

^{‡} Doubling-up between Premier and Elite League.
^{AS} Covering for Adam Skornicki.

2011 team

- (Sweden) Fredrik Lindgren
- (England) Tai Woffinden
- (Sweden) Peter Karlsson
- (Australia) Tyron Proctor
- (Sweden) Ludvig Lindgren
- (United States) Ricky Wells

2012 team

- (Sweden) Fredrik Lindgren
- (Australia) Ty Proctor
- (Denmark) Nicolai Klindt
- (United States) Ricky Wells
- (England) Tai Woffinden
- (Sweden) Pontus Aspgren
- (Sweden) Jacob Thorssell

2013 team

- (Sweden) Fredrik Lindgren
- (Australia) Ty Proctor
- (United States) Ricky Wells
- (Poland) Adam Skórnicki
- (England) Tai Woffinden
- (Sweden) Ludvig Lindgren
- (Sweden) Jacob Thorssell

2014 team

- (Poland) Piotr Pawlicki Jr.
- (England) Tai Woffinden
- (Sweden) Jacob Thorssell
- (Sweden) Peter Karlsson
- (Denmark) Lasse Bjerre
- (United States) Ricky Wells
- (Australia) Ty Proctor
- (England) Ashley Morris
- (England) Tom Perry
- (England) Joe Jacobs

2015 team

- (Sweden) Fredrik Lindgren
- (Sweden) Jacob Thorssell
- (Sweden) Peter Karlsson
- (United States) Ricky Wells
- (Poland) Tobiasz Musielak
- (England) Josh Bates
- (England) Lewis Blackbird

2016 team

- (Sweden) Fredrik Lindgren
- (Sweden) Jacob Thorssell
- (Australia) Sam Masters
- (England) Kyle Howarth
- (England) Max Clegg
- (England) Tai Woffinden
- (Sweden) Joonas Kylmakorpi
- (Denmark) Mikkel Bech

2017 team

- (Sweden) Fredrik Lindgren
- (Sweden) Jacob Thorssell
- (Australia) Sam Masters
- (England) Kyle Howarth
- (England) Max Clegg
- (Poland) Adam Skórnicki
- (England) Nathan Greaves
- (Australia) Rory Schlein
- (Germany) Mark Riss

2018 team

- (Sweden) Jacob Thorssell
- (England) Kyle Howarth
- (Australia) Cameron Heeps
- (Australia) Sam Masters
- (Australia) Rory Schlein
- (England) Max Clegg
- (England) Nathan Greaves
- (England) Ashley Morris

2019 team

- (Sweden) Jacob Thorssell
- (England) Kyle Howarth
- (Australia) Sam Masters
- (Australia) Rory Schlein
- (United States) Luke Becker
- (England) Ashley Morris
- (Australia) Nick Morris
- (England) Scott Nicholls (Cover for Jacob Thorssell)

2021 team

- (England) Tom Bacon
- (United States) Luke Becker
- (England) Leon Flint
- (Australia) Ryan Douglas
- (Australia) Sam Masters
- (Australia) Nick Morris
- (United States) Broc Nicol
- (Australia) Rory Schlein

2022 team

- (United States) Luke Becker
- (Australia) Ryan Douglas
- (United Kingdom) Drew Kemp
- (Australia) Sam Masters (C)
- (Australia) Nick Morris
- (United Kingdom) Steve Worrall
- (United Kingdom) Leon Flint (Rising Star)
- (United Kingdom) Joe Thompson (Number 8)

== Notable riders ==
- (Australia) Jim Airey
- (England) James Bond
- (United States) Ronnie Correy
- (New Zealand) Bruce Cribb
- (Denmark) Preben Eriksen
- (United States) Sam Ermolenko
- (England) Andy Grahame
- (United States) Billy Hamill
- (England) Dave Hemus
- (Scotland) George Hunter
- (England) Norman Hunter
- (England) Peter Jarman
- (Denmark) Jesper B. Jensen Monberg
- (Sweden) Mikael Karlsson Max
- (Sweden) Peter Karlsson
- (Sweden) Fredrik Lindgren
- (Australia) Sam Masters
- (England) Dave Morton
- (Denmark) Hans Nielsen
- (Denmark) Ole Olsen
- (Denmark) Nicki Pedersen
- (New Zealand) Gary Peterson
- (Denmark) Peter Ravn
- (Australia) Rory Schlein
- (United States) Bobby Schwartz
- (United States) Dennis Sigalos
- (Denmark) Jan Staechmann
- (England) Tommy Sweetman
- (Denmark) Finn Thomsen
- (Australia) Graham Warren
- (England) Tai Woffinden

== Olympique ==
Wolves hosted the Olympique annually.
