= Darryl Ritchings =

British speedway rider

- Born: 11 August 1994 (age 32); Swindon, England
- Nationality: British (English)

Career history
- 2009: Newport Hornets
- 2010–2012: Dudley Heathens
- 2013: Isle of Wight Islanders
- 2013, 2016: Somerset Rebels
- 2014–2015: Swindon Robins/Sprockets
- 2015: Coventry Storm
- 2016: Ipswich Witches
- 2016–2017: Birmingham Brummies
- 2025–2026: Oxford Chargers
- 2025: Poole Pirates
- 2026: Oxford Cheetahs

Team honours
- 2025: NDL champion

Darryl Jake Ritchings (born 11 August 1994) is a speedway rider from England.

== Speedway career ==
Ricthings started his speedway career in England riding for the Newport Hornets during the 2009 National League speedway season. After three seasons with Dudley Heathens, he joined the Isle of Wight Islanders in 2013 and made an appearance for Somerset Rebels in the Premier League.

After captaining the Swindon Sprockets, Ritchings made a handful of appearances in the top tier of British Speedway, riding for the Swindon Robins during the 2014 and 2015 seasons. During the 2014 season, he was involved in a serious accident when riding against Coventry. He went on to ride for Ipswich Witches during the 2016 Premier League speedway season and Birmingham Brummies from 2016 to 2017.

In 2025, Ritchings came out of retirement and helped Oxford Chargers win the National Development League title. He also appeared for Poole Pirates during the SGB Championship 2025 season.
