= Tom Perry (speedway rider) =

British speedway and grasstrack rider (born 1993)

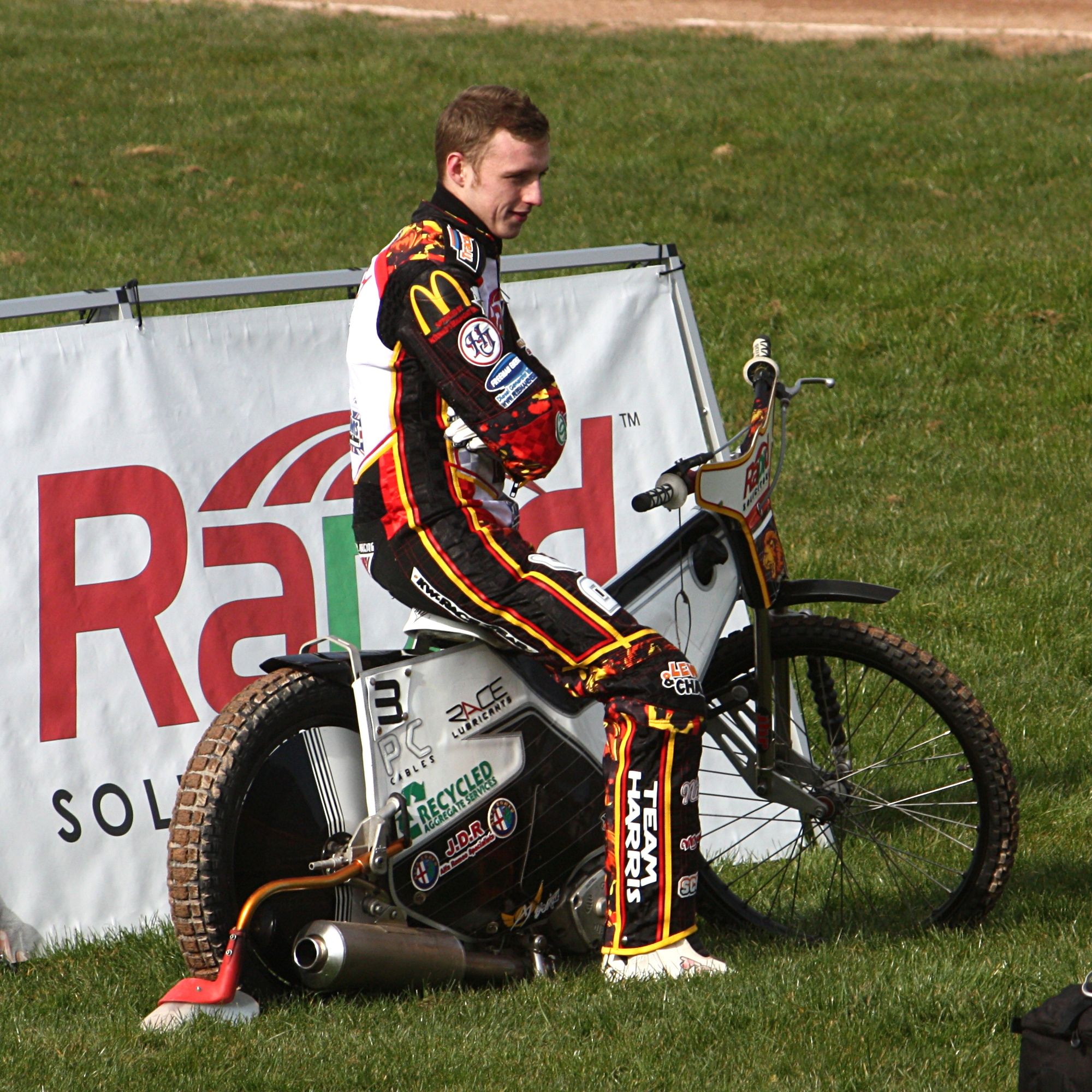
- Born: 22 February 1993 (age 33); Albrighton, Shropshire, England
- Nationality: British (English)

Career history
- 2010–2012, 2014, 2017: Dudley/Cradley Heathens
- 2012–2013: Somerset Rebels
- 2013: Isle of Wight Islanders
- 2014: Leicester Lions
- 2014: Wolverhampton Wolves
- 2014: Scunthorpe Scorpions
- 2015–2016: Birmingham Brummies
- 2016: Berwick Bandits
- 2016: Peterborough Panthers
- 2017: Glasgow Tigers
- 2018: Belle Vue Colts
- 2019: Stoke Potters

Team honours
- 2011: National Shield
- 2015: National League
- 2014, 2015, 2019: UK fours

Thomas Andrew Perry (born 22 February 1993) is a British speedway and grasstrack rider.

== Career ==
Born in Albrighton, Shropshire in 1993, Perry began grasstrack racing at the age of six and took up speedway at the age of ten. His grasstrack successes included winning the British 125cc Youth Championship in 2006, placing in the top three in both the 250cc and 350cc championships in 2009, a fourth place in the British Under-21 Championship and becoming the youngest rider ever to compete in the British Masters Championship when aged 16, finishing in fifth place.

In 2010, Perry joined National League speedway team Dudley Heathens, and continued to haves success in grasstrack, winning the British Under-21 Championship. After a successful first season is speedway, at the end of which he was voted 'rider of the year' by Heathens fans, he re-signed for the team in 2011, winning the National Shield with Heathens later that year. At the end of the season, he was awarded a Darren and Sharon Boocock Speedway Scholarship which saw him travel to Australia to gain experience racing in Queensland.

In 2012, Perry continued with Heathens and also rode in the Premier League for Somerset Rebels, riding in 36 matches for the club. He finished as runner-up in the British Under-21 Speedway Championship that year.

In 2013, Perry was retained by Somerset in the Premier League, also riding for Isle of Wight Islanders in the National League. He represented Great Britain in the Under-21 Speedway World Cup semi-final, and finished fifth in the British Under-21 Speedway Championship.

In December 2013, Perry was picked in the reserve draft to ride for Leicester Lions in the Elite League in 2014. He was also part of the Cradley team that won the National League Fours, held on 26 October 2014 at Brandon Stadium.

Perry was the 350cc British Grasstrack Champion in 2015 and experienced a very successful season riding for Birmingham Brummies during the 2015 National League speedway season. He won the National League title and was part of the Birmingham team that won the National League Fours, held on 14 June 2015 at Brandon Stadium.

Perry rode for the Belle Vue Colts during the 2018 National League speedway season and in 2019, he was part of the Stoke Potters team that won the NDL Fours, held on 13 July 2019 at Loomer Road Stadium.
