= Ashley Morris (speedway rider) =

British speedway rider (born 1994)

- Born: 6 May 1994 (age 32); Wolverhampton, England
- Nationality: British (English)

Career history
- 2009: Scunthorpe Saints
- 2010–2013: Dudley Heathens
- 2010–2011: Edinburgh Monarchs
- 2012–2014: Workington Comets
- 2014, 2018–2019: Wolverhampton Wolves
- 2015: King's Lynn Stars
- 2015: Ipswich Witches
- 2015: Plymouth Devils
- 2016–2018: Newcastle Diamonds
- 2017: Peterborough Panthers
- 2017: Scunthorpe Scorpions
- 2017: Cradley Heathens
- 2019–2022: Birmingham Brummies
- 2020: Sheffield Tigers

Individual honours
- 2009: British Under-15 Champion

Team honours
- 2010: Premier League
- 2011: National Shield
- 2011, 2013: National League Fours
- 2013: National League Pairs
- 2013: National League

Ashley Morris (born 6 May 1994) is a British speedway rider.

== Career ==
Born in Wolverhampton, Morris took up speedway as a 12-year-old in 2006, initially on a 150cc bike, moving up to 500cc in 2008. He was included in the Scunthorpe Saints National League team in 2009 in the number eight position, and went on to average 5.56 from fifteen matches. Also in 2009, he won the British Under-15 Championship.

In 2010, Morris joined Dudley Heathens and became a Wolverhampton Wolves asset. Towards the end of the 2010 season, he was drafted into the Edinburgh Monarchs Premier League team, making 12 appearances at an average of 2.36 in the team that went on to become Premier League champions. He remained with Dudley and Edinburgh in 2011, but was released by Edinburgh towards the end of April, subsequently riding for Leicester Lions as a replacement for the injured John Oliver.

With Dudley, Morris won both the National Shield and the National League Fours in 2011. He rode for Dudley and Workington Comets in 2012 and won a second National League Fours with Dudley. Morris was confirmed as captain of the Heathens for the 2013 season and was also named in the Comets team for 2013.

From 2016 to 2018, Morris rode for the Newcastle Diamonds and also rode for Wolverhampton Wolves in the highest league. In 2019, he signed for the Birmingham Brummies for the SGB Championship 2019 and SGB Championship 2021 seasons and was named as their club captain for the SGB Championship 2022.
