= Jerran Hart =

British speedway rider

- Born: 19 January 1991 (age 35); Ipswich, Suffolk
- Nationality: British (English)

Career history
- 2008: Newport Wasps
- 2008: Newcastle Diamonds
- 2009, 2010, 2012: Scunthorpe Scorpions
- 2008: Lakeside Hammers
- 2009, 2011: Ipswich Witches
- 2011: Coventry Bees
- 2011: Poole Pirates

Individual honours

Team honours
- 2011: Premier League Fours Champion

Jerran Hart (born 19 January 1991) is a former motorcycle speedway rider from England.

== Speedway career ==
Hart began his British career riding for Newport Wasps in 2008.

Hart rode in the top tier of British Speedway, riding for the Ipswich Witches during the 2009 Elite League speedway season. He was part of the Ipswich team that won the 2011 Premier League Four-Team Championship, held at Beaumont Park Stadium, although he did not ride in the final, he did help the Witches qualify from the semi final.

Hart's last season was riding for the Scunthorpe Scorpions in 2012.

In 2013, Hart was jailed for three years following a gang robbery of a 21-year-old soldier in Ipswich.
