= Edward Kennett =

British motorcycle speedway rider

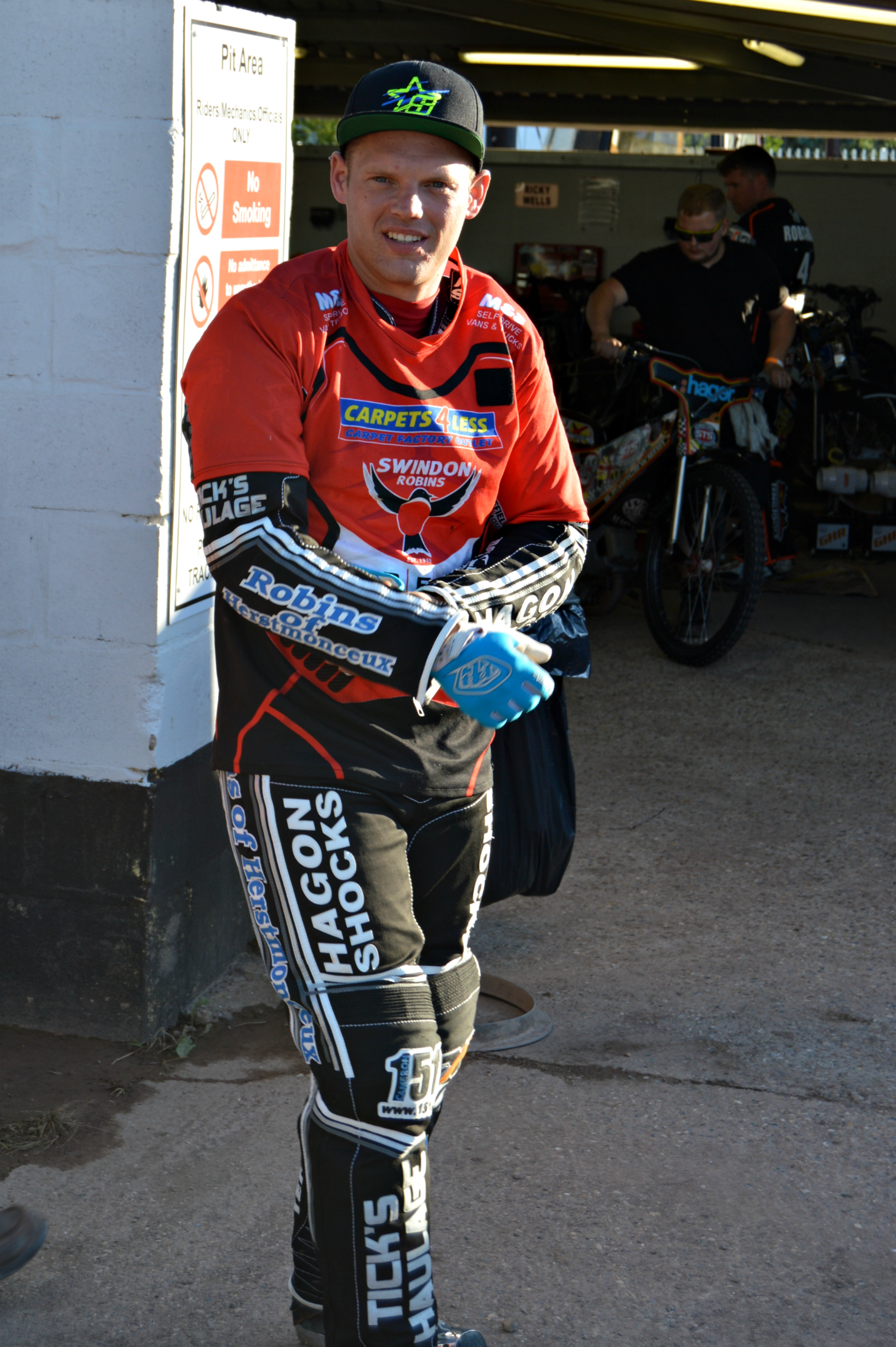
- Born: 28 August 1986 (age 40); Hastings, England
- Nationality: British (English)

Career history
- 2001–2003: Rye House Raiders
- 2001: Mildenhall Fen Tigers
- 2002–2003, 2005–2006, 2014–2018: Rye House Rockets
- 2003–2004, 2006, 2008, 2019–: Eastbourne Eagles
- 2005, 2007, 2017: Poole Pirates
- 2009–2012: Coventry Bees
- 2013: Swindon Robins
- 2013: Berwick Bandits
- 2014: Birmingham Brummies
- 2015–2016: Lakeside Hammers
- 2019: Ipswich Witches
- 2022–: Plymouth Gladiators
- 2026: Oxford Cheetahs

Speedway Grand Prix statistics
- Starts: 3
- Podiums: 0 (0-0-0)
- Finalist: 0 times
- Winner: 0 times

Individual honours
- 2005, 2007: British Under 21 Champion

Team honours
- 2008: Elite League Knockout Cup
- 2005: Premier League Champion
- 2005: Premier Trophy Winner

Edward David Kennett (born 28 August 1986 in Hastings, England) is a motorcycle speedway rider. He was the British Under-21 Champion in 2005 and has appeared in two Speedway Grand Prix as a wild card. He has recently retired from the sport due to injury.

== Family ==
Kennett's father Dave, was a motorcycle speedway rider who rode for the Eastbourne Eagles, Hackney Hawks, Newport Wasps and the White City Rebels. His uncle Gordon Kennett represented Great Britain, and rode for many clubs. Another uncle, Brian (Barney) Kennett, rode mainly in the British League Division Two/National League for the Canterbury Crusaders during the 1970s and 1980s.

== Career ==
Kennett started his racing career in the Conference League with the Rye House Raiders in 2001. He had his first permanent team place with the Raiders in 2002. The same season he made his Premier League debut for the Rye House Rockets. In 2004, he joined his local club the Eastbourne Eagles in the Elite League. Kennett joined Valsarna speedway, his first team in Sweden 2004. He struggled in his first season, and in 2005, he returned to Rye House Rockets in the Premier League.

The 2005 season saw Kennett become the British Under-21 Champion. He also qualified for the World Under-21 final where he finished in eighth place. The Rockets won the Premier League and the Premier Trophy. The Poole Pirates declared Eddie as their 'Number Eight' (first reserve) in the Elite League. He finished fifth in the British Speedway Championship Final and was also selected as a meeting reserve for the British Speedway Grand Prix held at the Millennium Stadium in Cardiff. Kennett decided to stay with Rye House for the 2006 season in the Premier League with promoter Len Silver who had signed his father for Hackney in 1971.

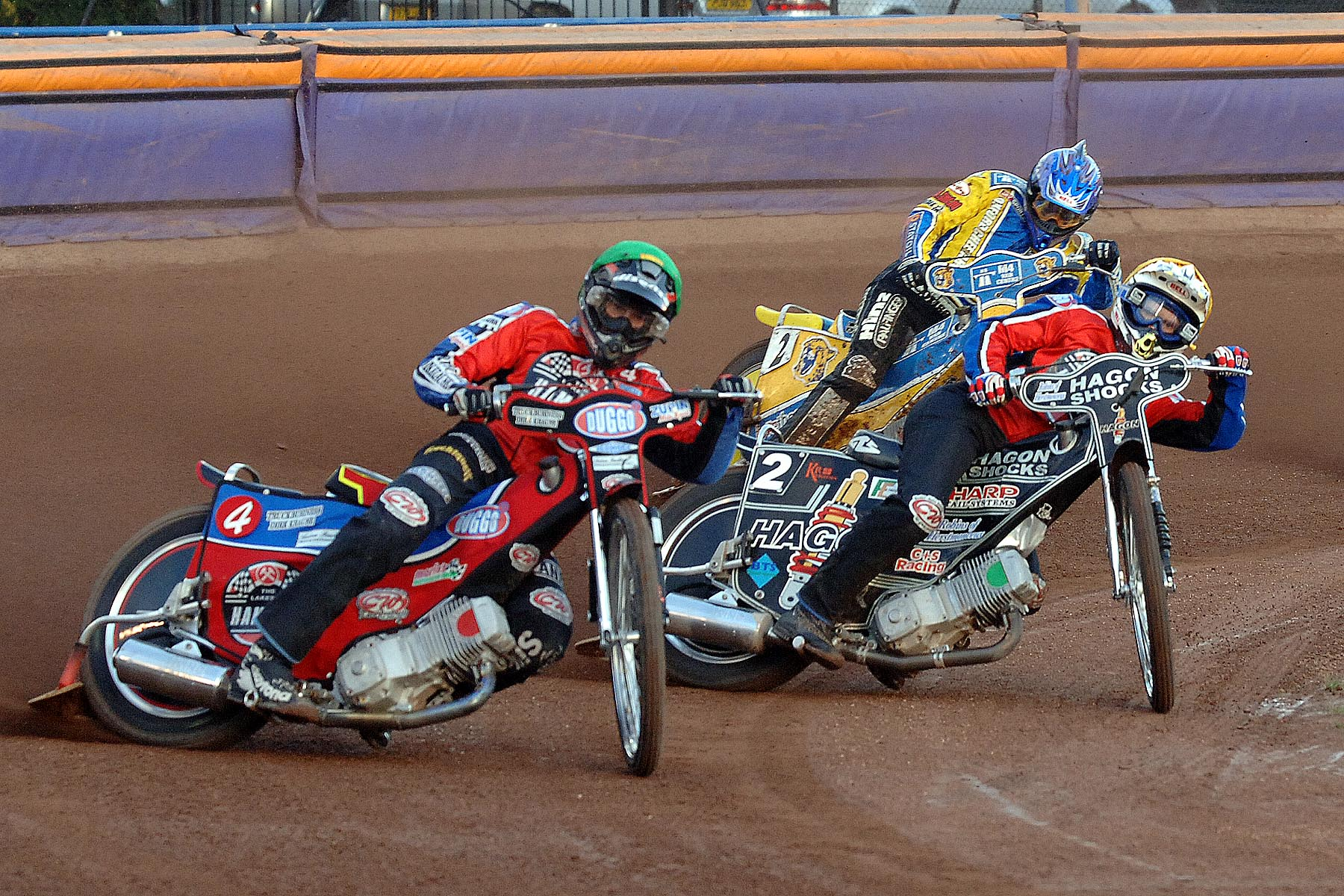
Kennett (right) racing as a guest for Lakeside in 2007

In 2007, Kennett chose to go back to the Elite League and signed for the Poole Pirates. He also finished fourth in the British Speedway Championship which ensured he would be a track reserve again for the British Speedway Grand Prix. In September 2007, Kennett was selected to represent Great Britain for the 2007 Under 21-World Cup Final.

Kennett returned to the Eastbourne Eagles in 2008 and won the Elite League Knockout Cup. He also finished as runner-up in the British Speedway Championship to Scott Nicholls and appeared in the British Grand Prix as a wild card.

Kennett was signed by Coventry in 2010, but resigned from Coventry in 2011 because his silencer was deemed 'illegal' when racing against Lakeside on 6 August. Kennett said this was caused by 'a member of his team' who had 'tampered with it'. Kennett was banned from racing for seven days by the SCB and appeared in front of a disciplinary hearing on 16 August where he received a six-month worldwide ban.

In 2013, Kennett signed for Premier League Berwick Bandits as a replacement for the injured Ricky Ashworth. He has also been named in the Team Great Britain world cup squad along with Chris Harris, Tai Woffinden and Craig Cook.

In 2022, Kennett rode for the Plymouth Gladiators in the SGB Championship 2022.

In 2026, Kennett joined Oxford Cheetahs on a 28 day contract, standing in for the injured Erik Riss.

== Speedway Grand Prix results ==
2005 Speedway Grand Prix Final Championship standings (Riding No 18)
Race no.	Grand Prix	Pos.	Pts.	Heats	Draw No
4 /9	(United Kingdom) British SGP	17	1	(0,1)	18

2006 Speedway Grand Prix Final Championship standings (Riding No 17)
Race no.	Grand Prix	Pos.	Pts.	Heats	Draw No
4 /10	(United Kingdom) British SGP	17	-	-	17

2007 Speedway Grand Prix Final Championship standings (Riding No 17)
Race no.	Grand Prix	Pos.	Pts.	Heats	Draw No
5 /11	(United Kingdom) British SGP	17	-	-	17

2008 Speedway Grand Prix Final Championship standings (Riding No 16)
Race no.	Grand Prix	Pos.	Pts.	Heats	Draw No
5 /11	(United Kingdom) British SGP	13	4	(1,0,0,1,2)	9

permanent speedway rider
wild card, track reserve or qualified reserve
rider not classified (track reserve who did not start)

== World Final appearances ==
=== World U-21 Championship ===
- 2005 - AUT Wiener Neustadt - 8th - 4pts
- 2007 - POL Ostrów Wlkp. - 11th - 5pts

=== World Cup ===
- 2007 - 4th - 0pts

=== U-21 World Cup ===
- 2005 - 10th place (4 pts in Semi-Final A)

== European Grasstrack Championship ==
- 2017 (Germany) Hertingen (Third) 13pts

== See also ==
- List of Speedway Grand Prix riders
