= Ricky Ashworth =

British speedway rider

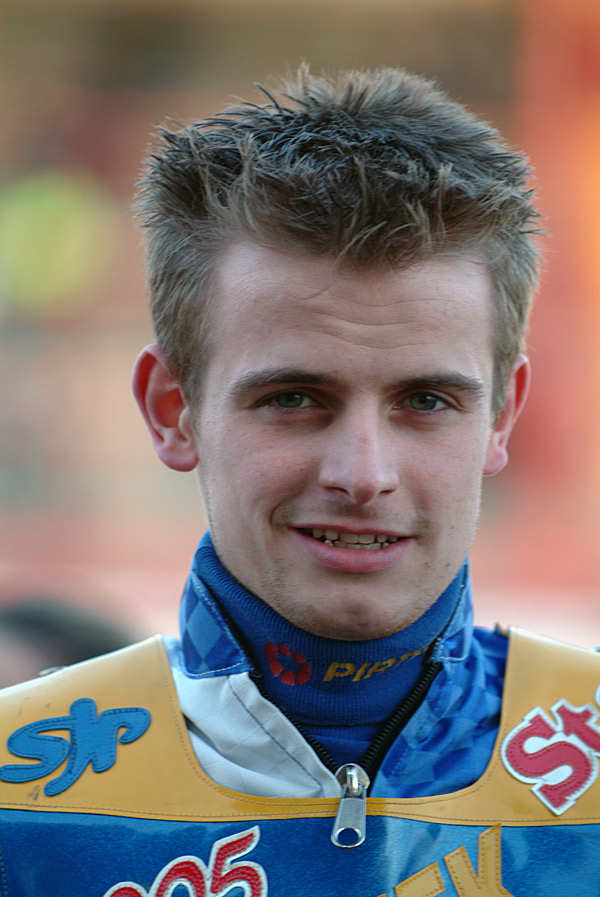
- Born: 17 August 1982 (age 44); Salford, England
- Nationality: British (English)

Career history
- 2001–2011: Sheffield Tigers
- 2004: Peterborough Panthers
- 2005: Poole Pirates
- 2012: Berwick Bandits
- 2012: Birmingham Brummies

Individual honours
- 2009: PL Riders Championship

Team honours
- 2002: PL Champions
- 2002: PL KO Cup Champions
- 2010: Premier League Pairs Champion
- 2012: Premier League Fours Champion

Richard David Ashworth (born 17 August 1982 in Salford, England) is a former professional motorcycle speedway rider who represented Great Britain.

== Biography ==
Son of David Ashworth and Mandy Winnard, Ricky was raised in Salford (originally from Irlam) and went to Summerville County primary school and then on to Hope High School. He started his racing career on a Yamaha PW 50cc and Kawasaki K100 as a motocross rider up to the age of 10, changing his bike career to grass track racing after experiencing financial difficulties due to the spiralling cost of privately owning and maintaining motocross bikes.

Ricky Ashworth at a Grass Meeting in Shrewsbury, England in 1999.

While gaining a high reputation for himself during his grass track days, Ashworth was introduced to speedway. After a couple of practice sessions on a speedway bike he was talent-spotted by Belle Vue Colts. He quickly signed for Premier League side Sheffield Tigers after just 12 months in the sport. He has since gone on to establish himself as a heat leader at the Owlerton club and has also experienced Elite League racing while doubling up with Peterborough Panthers in 2004 and Poole Pirates in 2005.

In 2006, Ashworth was given the number 1 jacket following the retirement of Sean Wilson and some of his best meetings came when he took on the captaincy following Andre Compton's absence. He retained the number 1 slot for the 2007 season. He took part in the Premier League Fours event in Peterborough, but fell on his first race while attempting to overtake.

On 27 November 2008, it was announced that Ashworth would once again ride for the Sheffield Tigers and also take over from Andre Compton as the Tigers Captain. On 27 September 2009, on his home track Owlerton, Ricky rode well to win the Premier League Riders Championship. He had top scored during the heats to gain automatic qualification to the Grand Final heat, where he was up against the riders Ty Proctor, Darcy Ward and David Howe. With an fast start from gate 1, he rode from the front to win his first honours in this event at the first time of trying.

In 2010, Ashworth doubled-up for Belle Vue Aces, along with retaining the captaincy for Sheffield Tigers. In 2010, he won the Premier League Pairs Championship partnering Josh Auty for Sheffield, during the 2010 Premier League speedway season.

On 14 October 2010, Ashworth broke his existing Sheffield track record of 59.2 secs (54.56 mph) set on 21 May 2009 with a new time of 59.1 secs at a speed of 54.65 mph).

After being omitted from the Tigers team for 2012, Ashworth signed for Plymouth Devils but at the end of January 2012 announced that he would not be joining Plymouth for personal reasons. The next day he signed for Berwick Bandits, replacing the injured Kozza Smith. In June 2012, he was added to Elite League Birmingham Brummies team in a doubling-up role. He was part of the Berwick team that won the Premier League Four-Team Championship, held on 15 July 2012, at the East of England Arena.

After suffering serious concussion earlier in the season, a crash at Scunthorpe in August 2013 left Ashworth in a coma for 91 days. The crash resulted in brain damage and he struggled to walk. In 2015, his friend and fellow rider Benji Compton completed a fundraising cycle to help with his support package.
