= Joe Haines (speedway rider) =

British former speedway rider (born 1991)

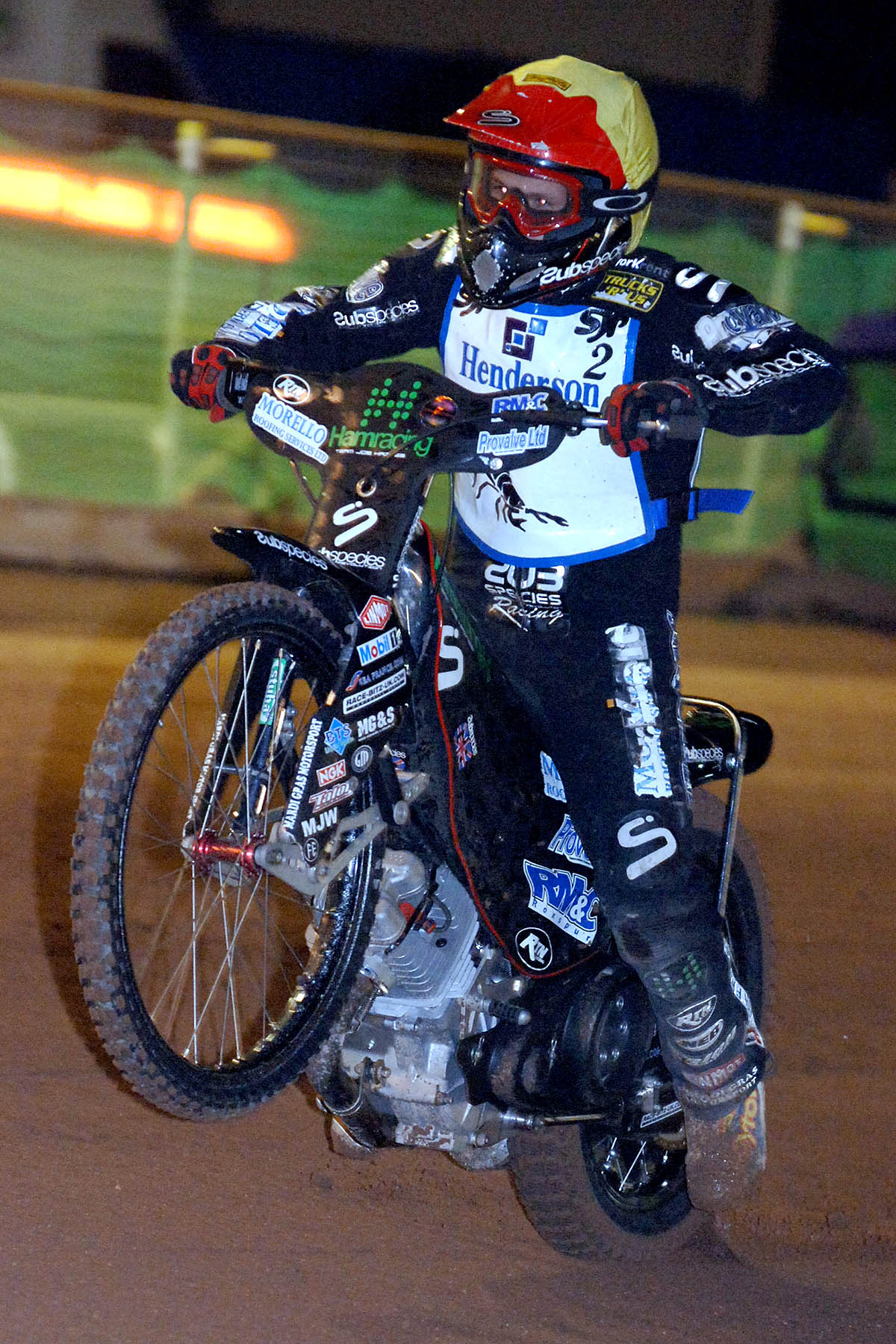
- Haines riding for Scunthorpe in 2007
- Born: 4 September 1991 (age 35); Bolton, England
- Nationality: British (English)

Career history
- 2007: Scunthorpe Scorpions
- 2008: Workington Comets
- 2008: Boston Barracudas
- 2009: Rye House Rockets
- 2009-2011: Wolverhampton Wolves
- 2010: King's Lynn Stars
- 2011: Scunthorpe Scorpions
- 2011: Somerset Rebels
- 2012-2013: Sheffield Tigers

Individual honours
- 2006: British Under 15 Champion
- 2010, 2012: British Under 21 Champion

Team honours
- 2008: Premier League Four-Team Champion
- 2008: Young Shield winner
- 2007: Conference League Champion
- 2007: Conference League KO Cup Winner
- 2007: Conference Trophy Winners

Joseph Keir M. Haines (born 4 September 1991) is a former motorcycle speedway rider from England.

== Career history ==
Born in Bolton, England, Haines started his speedway career in 2006 with the Cleveland Bears and then joined the Scunthorpe Scorpions in 2007 in the Conference League winning the League Championship, the Knockout Cup and the Conference Trophy in his first full season.

Wolverhampton Wolves signed Haines just after his sixteenth birthday and immediately loaned him to the Workington Comets for the 2008 season. He also rode for the Boston Barracudas in the Conference League in 2008. He was part of the Workington four who won the Premier League Four-Team Championship, held on 26 July 2008, at Derwent Park.

Haines started the 2009 season as the number eight for Wolverhampton and rode for Rye House Rockets in the Premier League. A serious injury halted his season mid way but he returned to the saddle in September and continued to improve.

In 2010, Haines rode for King's Lynn Stars in the Premier League while also doubling up with parent club, Wolverhampton in the Elite League. He became the 2010 British Under 21 Champion in April. While riding in Australia, during December 2010 he crashed in a race and suffered serious injury, which included a broken shoulder and ribs, a punctured lung, and vertebrae damage.

Haines went on to ride for Sheffield Tigers in the Premier League before retiring in 2013 aged just 22.
