= Josh Auty =

British speedway rider

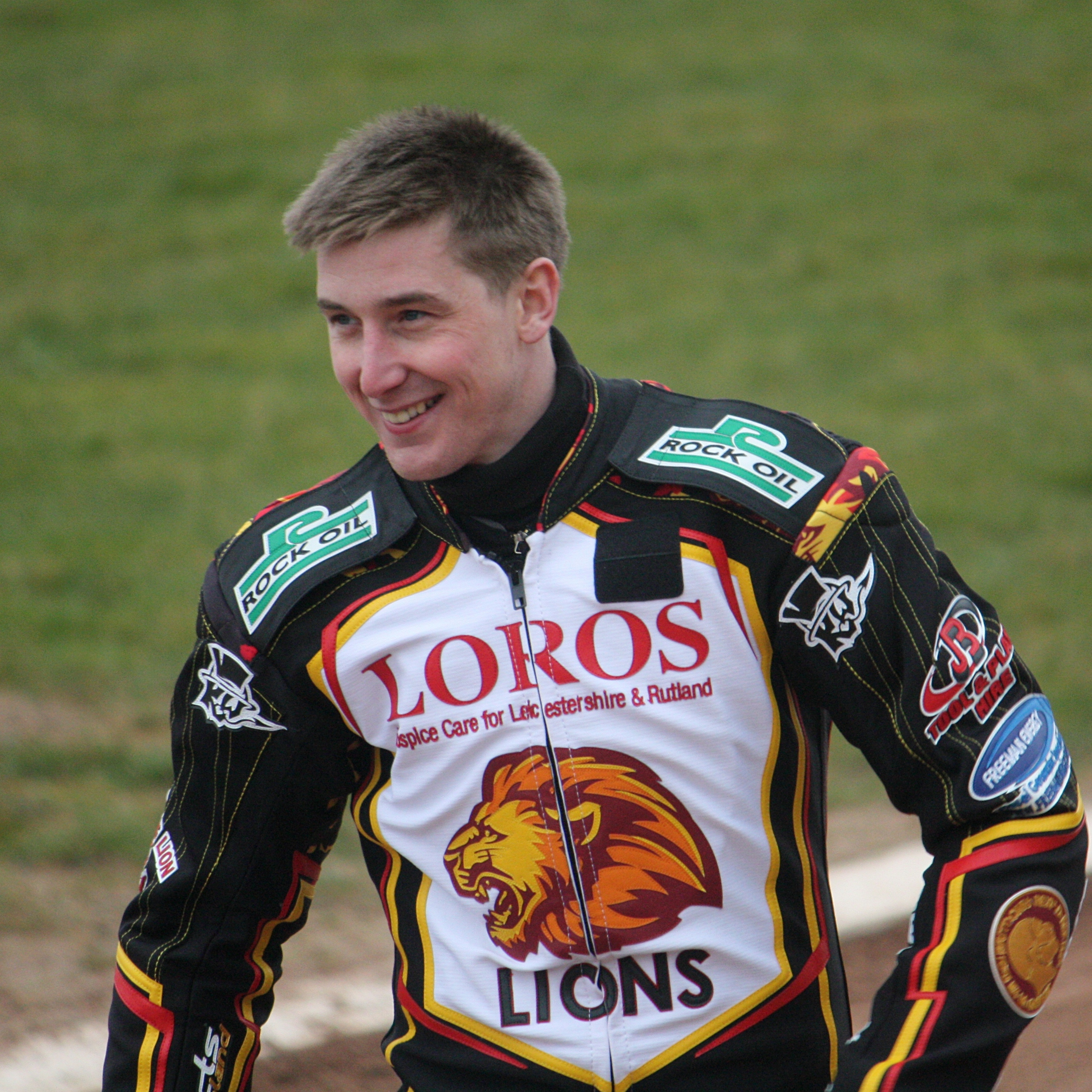
- Born: 8 September 1990 (age 36); Mirfield, England
- Nationality: British (English)

Career history
- 2005–2007, 2012–2021: Scunthorpe Scorpions
- 2007–2008: Redcar Bears
- 2009–2011: Sheffield Tigers
- 2009–2011: Coventry Bees
- 2012–2013, 2022: Birmingham Brummies
- 2015–2018: Leicester Lions
- 2017: King's Lynn Stars

Individual honours
- 2004, 2005: British Under-15 Champion
- 2010: Queensland State Champion (Aust)
- 2010: Jack Young Solo Cup winner

Team honours
- 2006: Conference League Champion
- 2006: Conference Trophy Winner
- 2006: Conference KO Cup Winner
- 2006: Conference Shield Winner
- 2007: Conference League Fours
- 2010: Premier League Pairs Champion

Joshua Liam Auty (born 8 September 1990, in Mirfield, West Yorkshire) is a British speedway rider.

== Career ==
Auty was part of the Scunthorpe Scorpions team that won the Conference League Four-Team Championship, held on 18 May 2007 at Plymouth Coliseum.

On 10 September 2007, Auty was signed to the Coventry Bees to ride in the Elite League. On 21 September 2007, he was selected to represent Great Britain for the 2007 Under 21-World Cup Final. Auty was Conference League Rider's championship runner up in 2007, held at Rye House, losing out to his Scunthorpe teammate Tai Woffinden.

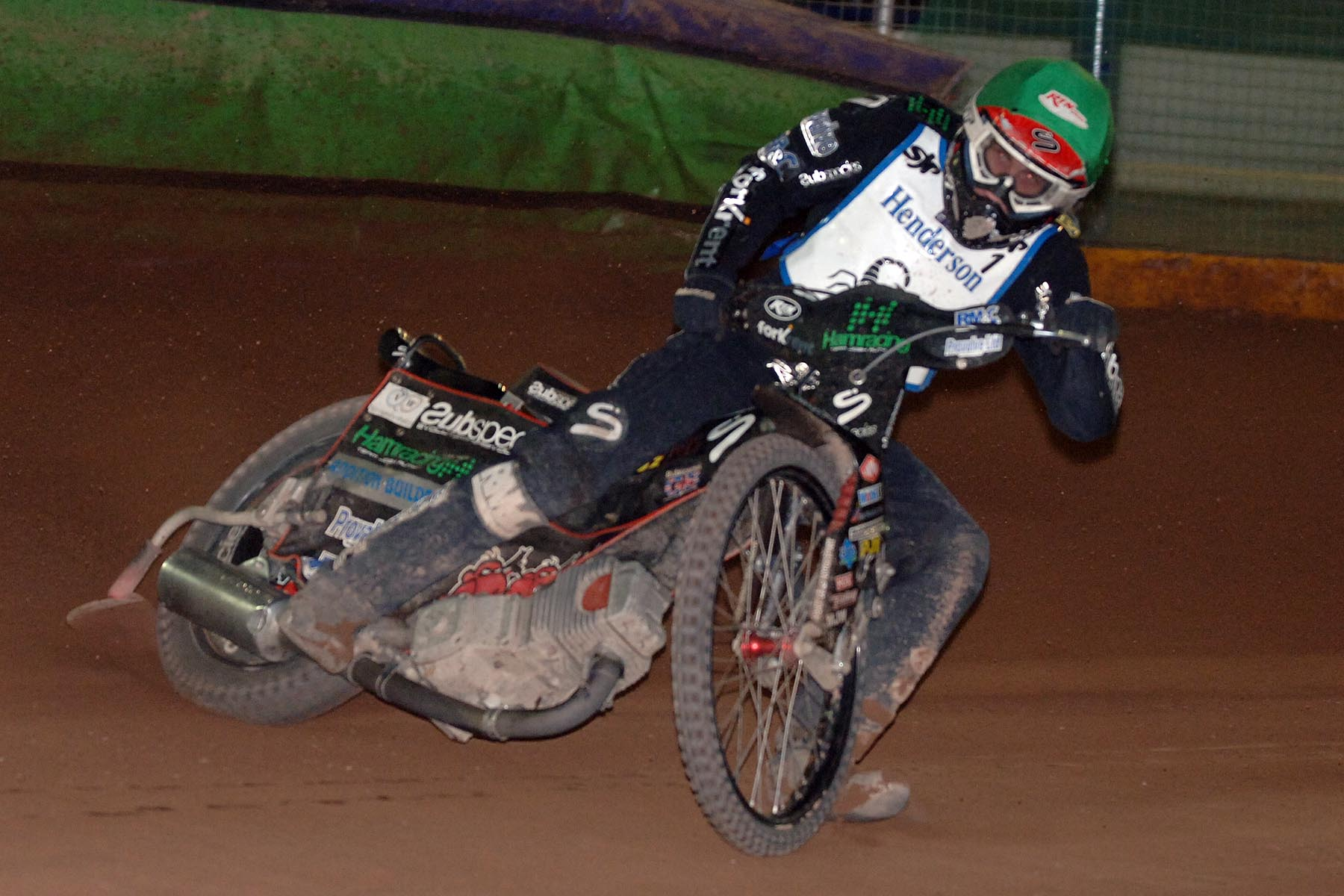
Auty riding for Scunthorpe in 2007

On 4 December 2008, Auty was signed on a loan deal from Coventry to Sheffield Tigers. In November 2011 he signed for Scunthorpe Scorpions for the 2012 Premier League season.

In 2010 Auty rode the off-season in Australia where he won the Queensland State Championship at the North Brisbane Speedway, as well as the Jack Young Solo Cup at the Gillman Speedway in Adelaide. During the 2010 Premier League speedway season, he won the Premier League Pairs Championship partnering Ricky Ashworth for Sheffield. Auty rode for Birmingham Brummies from 2012 to 2013.

Auty was included in the Elite League draft for the 2015 season and picked by Leicester Lions. He was again selected for the Lions for 2016.

After struggling in the SGB Premiership for Lions, Auty was dropped, and continued to ride in the SGB Championship for Scorpions until announcing his retirement from the sport at the end of May. He reversed his decision, however, a few days later; and spent the 2018 season riding for the Scunthorpe Scorpions. He continued to ride for Scunthorpe during the 2019 and 2021 seasons.

In 2022, Auty re-joined and rode for the Birmingham Brummies in the SGB Championship 2022.
