= 2006 Speedway Conference League =

British motorcycle speedway season

- League: Conference League
- Champions: Scunthorpe Scorpions
- Knockout Cup: Scunthorpe Scorpions
- Conference Trophy: Scunthorpe Scorpions
- Individual: Adam Roynon
- Pairs: Scunthorpe Scorpions
- Fours: Stoke Spitfires
- Division/s above: 2006 Elite League; 2006 Premier League

The 2006 Speedway Conference League was the third tier/division of British speedway.

== Summary ==
The title was won by Scunthorpe Scorpions who won the playoffs.

== League ==
=== Final table ===
Pos	Team	Played	HW	HD	HL	AW	AD	AL	F	A	Bonus	Total
1	Plymouth Devils	14	7	0	0	4	0	3	719	561	7	29
2	Scunthorpe Scorpions	14	6	0	1	5	0	2	756	521	6	28
3	Rye House Raiders	14	6	0	1	3	0	4	705	581	5	23
4	Stoke Spitfires	14	4	1	2	3	0	4	599	657	3	18
5	Boston Barracuda-Braves	14	4	0	3	3	0	4	666	616	3	17
6	Buxton Hitmen	14	5	0	2	0	0	7	639	655	3	13
7	Mildenhall Academy	14	3	0	4	1	1	5	562	722	1	10
8	Newport Mavericks	14	1	0	6	0	0	7	460	793	0	2

=== Fixtures and results ===
Home \ Away	BOS	BUX	MIL	NEW	PLY	RYE	SCU	STO
Boston Barracuda Braves		47–43	66–24	65–24	44–46	44–49	40–53	51–43
Buxton Hitmen	47–43		55–38	63–31	52–43	47–43	41–52	45–46
Mildenhall Fen Tigers	37–53	51–44		49–40	49–44	31–58	41–52	51–44
Newport Mavericks	37–55	48–46	43–46		31–49	31–59	39–55	31–43
Plymouth Devils	54–38	55–36	54–42	65–29		51–43	56–38	66–26
Rye House Raiders	61–32	54–38	63–31	64–26	44–46		47–46	65–27
Scunthorpe Scorpions	52–40	54–39	59–34	75–15	44–46	67–24		64–28
Stoke Spitfires	46–48	50–43	45–45	59–35	45–44	50–43	31–45	

Legend: Blue = home team win; Yellow = draw; Red = away team win.

=== Play-offs ===
Semi-finals
Rye House	38	32	70
Scunthorpe	52	62	114
Plymouth
bye

Grand Final
Scunthorpe	67	58	125
Plymouth	25	36	61

15 October	Scunthorpe Scorpions; Richie Dennis 14; Paul Cooper 11; Josh Auty 10; Tai Woffinden 9 Andrew Tully 9 Byron Bekker 7 Benji Compton 7	67–25	Plymouth Devils; Lee Smart 12; Rob Smith 6 Tom Brown 6 Shane Waldron 1 Jamie Pickard 0 Andrew Braithwaite 0 Seemond Stephens R/R	Eddie Wright Raceway

27 October	Plymouth Devils; Lee Smart 11; Tom Brown 8 Jamie Pickard 2 Shane Waldron 1 Jamie Westacott R/R	36–58	Scunthorpe Scorpions; Tai Woffinden 12; Andrew Tully 12; Josh Auty 11; Richie Dennis 10; Benji Compton 7 Byron Bekker 6 Paul Cooper R/R	Plymouth Coliseum

== Conference League Knockout Cup ==
The 2006 Conference League Knockout Cup was the ninth edition of the Knockout Cup for tier three teams. Scunthorpe Scorpions were the winners.

First round

Date	Team one	Score	Team two
23/07	Scunthorpe	59-36	Stoke
26/07	Stoke	47-46	Scunthorpe
26/08	Rye House	50-43	Mildenhall
27/08	Newport	41-48	Plymouth

Semi-finals

Date	Team one	Score	Team two
04/09	Scunthorpe	52-36	Rye House
23/09	Rye House	45-45	Scunthorpe

Final

13 October	Plymouth Devils; Seemond Stephens 12; Lee Smart 10; Tom Brown 9 Rob Smith 7 Shane Waldron 4 Matt Bates 0 Jamie Pickard 0	42–51	Scunthorpe Scorpions; Tai Woffinden 14; Josh Auty 12; Richie Dennis 7 Andrew Tully 7 Benji Compton 7 Byron Bekker 4 Paul Cooper R/R	Plymouth Coliseum

22 October	Scunthorpe Scorpions; Andrew Tully 11; Benji Compton 8 Paul Cooper 7 Tai Woffinden 6 Richie Dennis 6 Byron Bekker 6 Josh Auty 4	48–24	Plymouth Devils; Lee Smart 9 Michael Coles 5 Tom Brown 5 Shane Waldron 3 Rob Smith 1 Jamie Pickard 1 Seemond Stephens R/R	Eddie Wright Raceway

== Conference Trophy ==
West Group

Pos	Team	M	W	D	L	Pts
1	Plymouth	4	4	0	0	8
2	Buxton	4	1	0	3	2
3	Stoke	4	1	0	3	2

East Group

Pos	Team	M	W	D	L	Pts
1	Scunthorpe	4	4	0	0	8
2	Mildenhall	4	2	0	2	4
3	Boston	4	0	0	4	0

Home \ Away	BUX	PLY	STO
Buxton		32–60	44–48
Plymouth	57–36		64–27
Stoke	32–39	34–38	

Legend: Blue = home team win; Yellow = draw; Red = away team win.

Home \ Away	BOS	MIL	SCU
Boston		43–44	38–52
Mildenhall	55–38		36–57
Scunthorpe	57–37	60–33	

Legend: Blue = home team win; Yellow = draw; Red = away team win.

Final

Team one	Team two	Score
Plymouth	Scunthorpe	39–51, 36–59

== Riders' Championship ==
Adam Roynon won the Riders' Championship. The final was held on 9 September at Rye House Stadium.

Pos.	Rider	Team	Total
1	Adam Roynon	Buxton	15
2	David Mason (res)	Weymouth	12
3	Seemond Stephens	Plymouth	11
4	Lee Smart	Plymouth	10
5	Scott Courtney	Stoke	9
6	Mark Thompson	Mildenhall	8
7	Tai Woffinden	Scunthorpe	8
8	John Oliver	Boston	8
9	Ben Powell	Rye House	7
10	Adam Allott	Stoke	7
11	Andrew Bargh	Mildenhall	6
12	Gary Cottham (res)	Sittingbourne	6
13	Barry Burchatt	Rye House	4
14	Scott James	Buxton	3
15	Josh Auty	Scunthorpe	3
16	Wayne Broadhurst	Boston	2
17	Nicki Glanz	Newport	1
18	Karl Mason	Newport	0

== Pairs ==
The Pairs Championship was held at the Eddie Wright Raceway, on 28 August. The event was won by Paul Cooper and Benji Compton of the Scunthorpe.

Group A
Pos	Team	Pts	Riders
1	Scunthorpe B	22	Paul Cooper 12, Benji Compton 10
2	Stoke	20	Ben Barker 12, Adam Allott 8
3	Scunthorpe A	19	Richie Dennis 13, Josh Auty 6
4	Buxton	10	Scott James 8, Ben Taylor 2
5	Rye House	17	Robert Mear 9, Barry Burchatt 8

Group B
Pos	Team	Pts	Riders
1	Plymouth	25	Seemond Stephens 12, Lee Smart 13
2	Mildenhall	23	Mark Thompson 12, Andrew Bargh 11
3	Boston	17	John Oliver 14, Wayne Broadhurst 3
4	Cleveland	12	Paul Burnett 10, Jittendra Duffill 2
5	Newport	11	Karl Mason 8, Nicki Glanz 5

- Semi-Final 1: Scunthorpe bt Mildenhall 7-0 (Cooper, Compton, Bargh (ret), Thompson(Fx))
- Semi-Final 2: Stoke bt Plymouth 7-2 (Barker, Allott, Smart, Stephens(Fx))
- Final: 7-2 Scunthorpe bt Stoke (Cooper, Compton, Allott, Barker(Fx))

== Fours ==
Stoke won the Conference League Four-Team Championship, held on 24 June 2006 at Loomer Road Stadium.

Group A
Pos	Team	Pts	Riders
1	Stoke	18	Barker 5, Priest 5, Irving 4, Courtney 4,
2	Plymouth	16	Johnson 6, Stephens 5, Smart 4, Waldron 1
3	Boston	10	Mallett 4, Stoddart 3, Martin 2, Broadhurst 1
4	Newport	4	Blake 2, Mason 1, Lowe 1, Hurst 0, Legg 0

Group B
Pos	Team	Pts	Riders
1	Scunthorpe	19	Dennis 5, Carter 5, Auty 5, Woffinden 4
2	Mildenhall	12	Bargh 5, Thompson 3, Wright 3, Purchase 2
3	Buxton	12	Taylor 5, James 4, Roynon 3, Bethell 0
4	Rye House	5	Mear 2, Halsey 1, Burchatt 1, Cook 1

Final
Pos	Team	Pts	Riders
1	Stoke	16+3	Barker 6, Courtney 5, Priest 4+3, Irving 1
2	Plymouth	16+2	Johnson 6+2, Stephens 5, Waldron 3, Smart 2
3	Mildenhall	10	Wright 5, Thompson 4, Bargh 1, Purchase 0
4	Scunthorpe	6	Auty 3, Isherwood 2, Carter 1, Woffinden 0

== See also ==
List of United Kingdom Speedway League Champions
