= 2007 Speedway Conference League =

British motorcycle speedway season

- League: Conference League
- Champions: Scunthorpe Scorpions
- Knockout Cup: Scunthorpe Scorpions
- Conference Trophy: Scunthorpe Scorpions
- Individual: Tai Woffinden
- Pairs: Boston Barracudas
- Fours: Scunthorpe Scorpions
- Division/s above: 2007 Elite League; 2007 Premier League

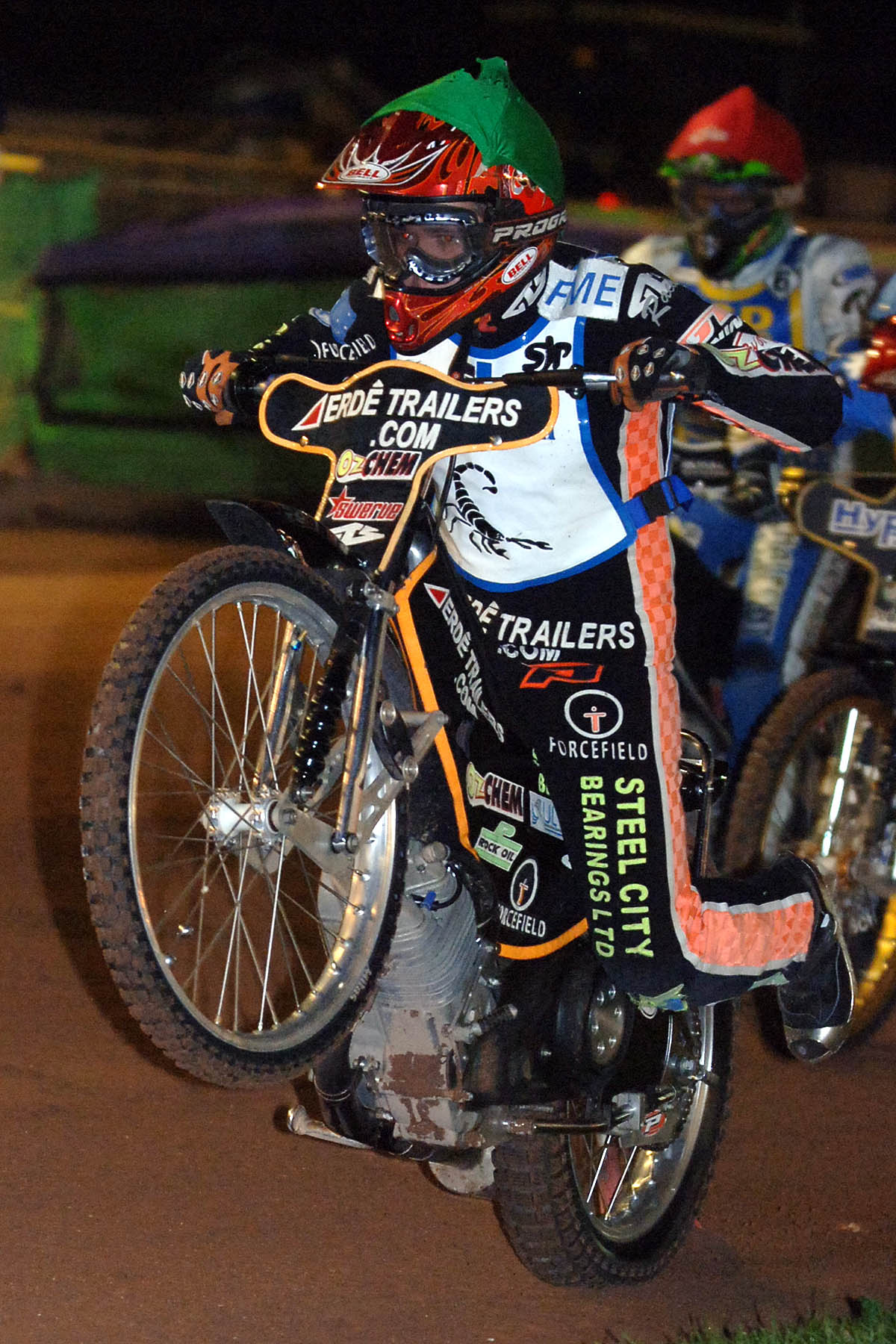
Woffinden riding for Scunthorpe in 2007

The 2007 Speedway Conference League was the third tier/division of British speedway.

== Summary ==
The title was won by Scunthorpe Scorpions for the second successive year. Scunthorpe also won the Knockout Cup, Conference Trophy and Conference League Fours. Their leading rider was Tai Woffinden who also won the Conference League Riders' Championship.

The Oxford Lions took their senior side team name Oxford Cheetahs following the withdrawal of the senior side from the 2007 Elite League speedway season. In June 2007, businessman Allen Trump invested in the club (also sponsoring the club via LCD Publishing) to secure the lease on the track and the Cheetahs completed the 2007 season in the Conference League, replacing their junior side the Oxford Lions.

== Final league table ==
Pos	Team	Played	HW	HD	HL	AW	AD	AL	F	A	Pts	AP	Total
1	Scunthorpe Scorpions	18	9	0	0	7	0	2	993	637	32	9	41
2	Oxford Lions/Cheetahs	18	9	0	0	4	1	4	921	729	27	8	35
3	Plymouth Devils	18	8	0	1	3	0	6	872	769	22	6	28
4	Boston Barracudas	18	8	0	1	2	1	6	842	801	21	5	26
5	Weymouth Wildcats	18	7	1	1	2	0	7	841	801	19	5	24
6	Rye House Raiders	18	7	0	2	1	0	8	844	794	16	6	22
7	Buxton Hitmen	18	7	0	2	1	0	8	762	886	16	1	17
8	Stoke Spitfires	18	5	1	3	2	0	7	757	898	15	2	17
9	Cleveland Bays	18	2	1	6	1	0	8	719	910	7	3	10
10	Sittingbourne Crusaders	18	2	0	7	0	1	8	653	979	5	0	5

=== Key ===
- HW=Home win
- HD=Home draw
- HL=Home loss
- AW=Away win
- AD=Away draw
- AL=Away loss

== Fixtures & results ==
Home \ Away	BOS	BUX	CB	OX	PLY	RYE	SCU	SIT	STO	WEY
Boston Barracuda Braves		58–34	56–33	44–48	49–43	65–26	46–43	55–38	52–44	47–42
Buxton Hitmen	47–43		50–42	59–36	53–42	47–43	38–54	56–31	39–54	55–35
Cleveland Bays	46–47	50–41		43–49	43–47	41–48	34–57	45–45	57–36	44–46
Oxford Lions/Cheetahs	50–43	67–23	70–18		53–38	50–43	47–45	71–21	57–35	49–44
Plymouth Devils	51–40	64–26	48–40	51–41		47–40	43–46	64–28	67–25	50–43
Rye House Raiders	61–33	57–35	60–33	37–54	60–33		43–48	61–28	54–38	58–33
Scunthorpe Scorpions	50–31	58–35	64–28	58–35	52–40	61–28		60–29	67–23	54–37
Sittingbourne Crusaders	40–53	42–48	38–54	45–44	38–51	49–39	24–68		44–49	43–47
Stoke Spitfires	46–46	53–39	51–35	37–55	44–49	52–40	32–60	52–43		47–43
Weymouth Wildcats	59–34	58–37	57–33	45–45	48–44	47–46	44–48	62–27	51–40	

Legend: Blue = home team win; Yellow = draw; Red = away team win.

== Play-offs ==
Semi-finals
Oxford	56	37	93
Plymouth	38	54	92
Boston	36	30	66
Scunthorpe	58	63	121

Grand Final
Oxford	42	31	73
Scunthorpe	47	61	108

=== Final ===
19 October

Oxford Lions/Cheetahs; Lee Smethills 10; Kyle Hughes 7 Danny Betson 7 Andrew Bargh 6 Sam Martin 5 Scott Campos 4 Brendan Johnson 0	42–47	Scunthorpe Scorpions; Tai Woffinden 17; Bryon Bekker 10; Joe Haines 10; Benji Compton 5 James Cockle 4 Scott Richardson 1 R/R	Oxford Stadium

21 October	Scunthorpe Scorpions; Tai Woffinden; Bryon Bekker; Joe Haines; Benji Compton; James Cockle; Scott Richardson; R/R	61–31	Oxford Lions/Cheetahs; Lee Smethills; Kyle Hughes; Danny Betson; Andrew Bargh; Jordan Frampton; Scott Campos; Brendan Johnson	Eddie Wright Raceway

== Conference League Knockout Cup ==
The 2007 Conference League Knockout Cup was the tenth edition of the Knockout Cup for tier three teams. Scunthorpe Scorpions were the winners for the second successive year.

First round

Date	Team one	Score	Team two
18/04	Stoke	50-40	Weymouth
20/04	Weymouth	54-32	Stoke
22/04	Sittingbourne	32-59	Rye House

Quarter-finals

Date	Team one	Score	Team two
08/07	Oxford	45-44	Plymouth
27/07	Plymouth	45-44	Oxford
07/09	Plymouth	63-30	Oxford
28/07	Cleveland	35-35	Boston
10/06	Scunthorpe	59-31	Rye House
16/06	Rye House	52-41	Scunthorpe
08/07	Buxton	43-50	Weymouth

Semi-finals

Date	Team one	Score	Team two
29-Sep	Weymouth	45-45	Plymouth
30-Sep	Scunthorpe	51-45	Boston
05 Oct	Boston	30-62	Scunthorpe

=== Final ===
26 October	Plymouth Devils	49–44	Scunthorpe Scorpions	Plymouth Coliseum

28 October	Scunthorpe Scorpions	58–35	Plymouth Devils	Eddie Wright Raceway

== Conference Trophy ==
North Group

Pos	Team	M	W	D	L	Pts
1	Scunthorpe	6	6	0	0	12
2	Buxton	6	3	0	3	6
3	Boston	6	2	0	4	4
4	Stoke	6	1	0	5	2

South Group

Pos	Team	M	W	D	L	Pts
1	Plymouth	4	4	0	0	8
2	Oxford	4	1	0	3	2
3	Weymouth	4	1	0	3	2

Home \ Away	BOS	BUX	SCU	STO
Boston		56–36	40–52	55–37
Buxton	48–46		37–52	52–39
Scunthorpe	58–35	64–28		69–21
Stoke	47–43	44–46	36–58	

Legend: Blue = home team win; Yellow = draw; Red = away team win.

Home \ Away	OX	PLY	WEY
Oxford		42–48	57–34
Plymouth	58–34		60–34
Weymouth	52–41	44–48	

Legend: Blue = home team win; Yellow = draw; Red = away team win.

Final

Team one	Team two	Score
Plymouth	Scunthorpe	33–59, 28–65

== Riders' Championship ==
Tai Woffinden won the Riders' Championship. The final was held on 15 September at Rye House Stadium.

Pos.	Rider	Team	Total
1	Tai Woffinden	Scunthorpe	15
2	Josh Auty	Scunthorpe	13
3	Robert Mear	Rye House	12
4	Jey Herne	Weymouth	9
5	Danny Warwick	Sittingbourne	9
6	Lee Smart	Weymouth	9
7	Ben Taylor	Buxton	8
8	Barrie Evans	Stoke	8
9	John Branney	Stoke	7
10	Mark Burrows	Cleveland	7
11	Tom Brown	Plymouth	6
12	Danny Halsey	Rye House	5
13	Andrew Bargh	Oxford	5
14	Lee Smethills	Oxford	4
15	Nicki Glanz	Plymouth	3
16	Simon Lambert	Boston	0

== Pairs ==
The Pairs Championship was held at the Eddie Wright Raceway, on 22 July. The event was won by Paul Cooper and Simon Lambert of the Boston.

Group A
Pos	Team	Pts	Riders
1	Boston		P Cooper, S Lambert
?	Cleveland		G Blair, M Burrows
?	Rye House		R Mear, Karlis
?	Scunthorpe		T Woffinden, A Tully
?	Weymouth		L Smart, J Herne

Group B
Pos	Team	Pts	Riders
1	Oxford		J Frampton, L Smethills
?	Buxton		J Bethell, J Roberts
?	Stoke		J Branney, B Evans
?	Plymouth		
?	Sittingbourne		

Final

- Boston bt Oxford 7–2

== Fours ==
Scunthorpe won the Conference League Four-Team Championship, held on 18 May 2007 at Plymouth Coliseum.

Group A
Pos	Team	Pts	Riders
1	Scunthorpe	20	Woffinden, Bekker, Auty, Dennis
2	Buxton	14	James, Roberts, Taylor, Bethell
3	Oxford	11	Martin, MacDonald, Hughes, Hopwood
4	Sittingbourne	3	Felton, Reynolds, Goody, Meakins

Group B
Pos	Team	Pts	Riders
1	Plymouth	22	Stephens, Brown, Roynon, Glanz
2	Weymouth	11	Smart, Hurst, Irwin, Mason
3	Cleveland	8	Burrows, Emerson, Blair, Beaton
4	Boston	7	Wright, Smith, Mallett, Lambert

Final
Pos	Team	Pts	Riders
1	Scunthorpe	19	Woffinden, Bekker, Auty, Dennis
2	Plymouth	16	Stephens, Brown, Roynon, Glanz
3	Weymouth	8	Smart, Hurst, Irwin, Mason
4	Buxton	5	James, Roberts, Taylor, Bethell

== See also ==
List of United Kingdom Speedway League Champions
