= Mattie Bates =

British motorcycle speedway rider

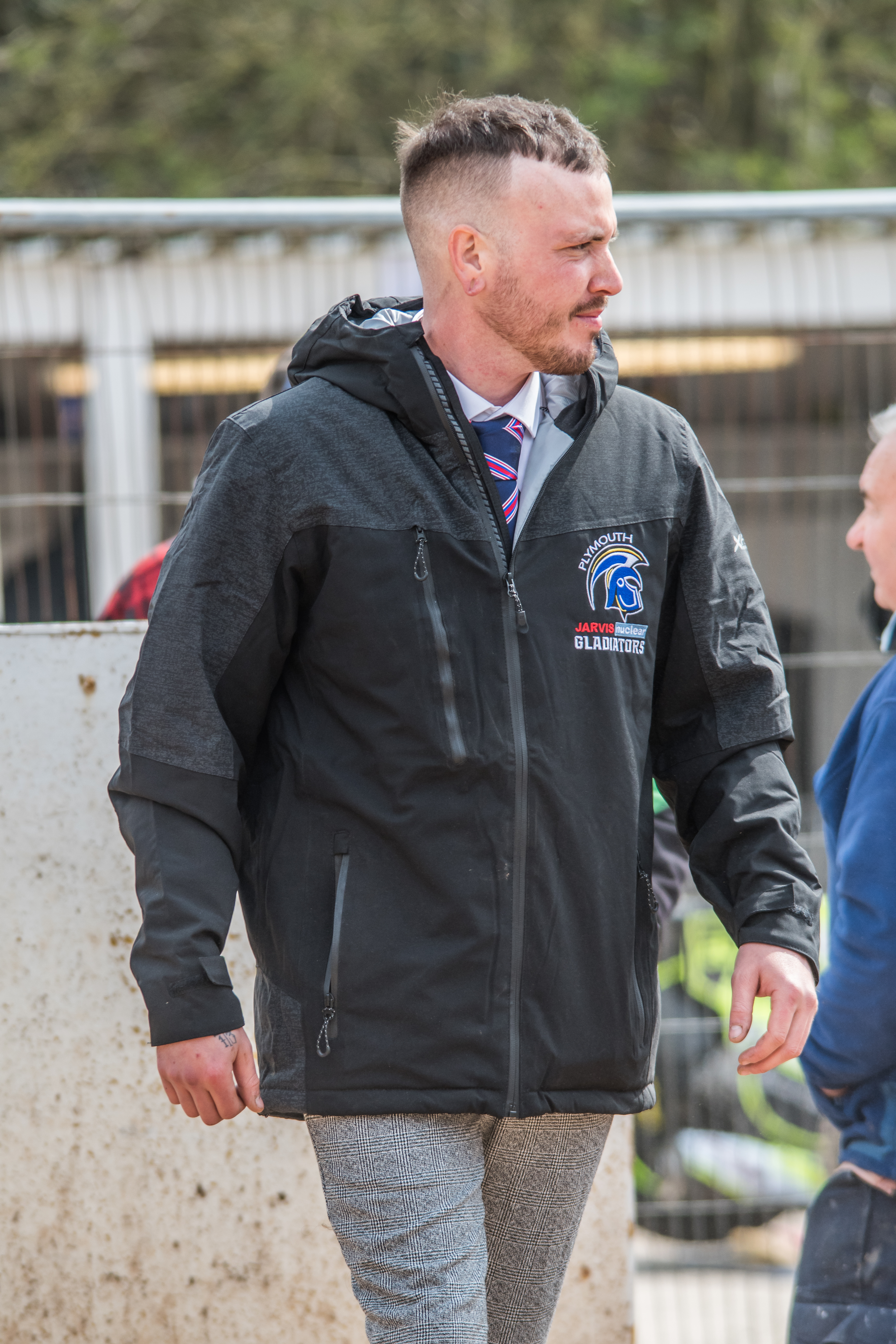
- Born: 26 July 1989 (age 37); Exeter, Devon, England
- Nationality: British (English)

Current club information
- Promoter: Plymouth Gladiators

Career history
- 2004–2005: Weymouth
- 2006, 2009–2010: Plymouth
- 2007: Oxford
- 2010: Mildenhall
- 2011: Newport
- 2014: Devon
- 2015, 2017: Eastbourne

Team honours
- 2009: National Trophy Winner
- 2017: K.O. Cup Winner

Matthew Richard Bates (born 26 July 1989, in Exeter, Devon) is a former motorcycle speedway rider from England.

== Career ==
Bates began his speedway career with the Weymouth Wildcats during the 2004 Speedway Conference League. The following season he rode for Plymouth Devils before joining the Oxford junior side for the 2007 Speedway Conference League season, following the demise of the Oxford Elite league team.

Bates returned to Plymouth in the National League (third tier of British speedway) for the 2009 and 2010 seasons. He helped Plymouth win the National Trophy in 2009. In 2011, he rode for the Newport Hornets during the 2011 National League speedway season.

Bates later rode for the Devon Demons in the 2014 National League speedway season and then joined the Eastbourne Eagles for the 2015 National League speedway season, where he helped the team win the knockout cup, although he did not ride in the final.

== Management ==
After retiring from active racing in 2017, Bates became co promoter and team manager for the Plymouth Gladiators in the British National League.
