= 2012 Premier League speedway season =

2012 edition of the second tier/division of British motorcycle speedway

- Champions: Scunthorpe Scorpions
- Knockout Cup: Newcastle Diamonds
- Individual: Craig Cook
- Pairs: Workington Comets
- Fours: Berwick Bandits
- Highest average: Jason Doyle
- Division/s above: 2012 Elite League
- Division/s below: 2012 National League

The 2012 Premier League season was the second tier/division of British speedway.

== Summary ==
The season took place between March and October 2012. The Glasgow Tigers were the defending champions after winning in 2011.

Scunthorpe Scorpions won the league after beating Somerset Rebels in the play-offs by one point in the Grand Final.

== Fixtures & results ==
| Home \ Away | BER | ED | GLA | IPS | LEI | NEW | PLY | RED | RYE | SCU | SHE | SOM | WOR |
|---|---|---|---|---|---|---|---|---|---|---|---|---|---|
| Berwick Bandits | | 40–50 | 49–41 | 55–39 | 43–49 | 46–43 | 56–39 | 65–28 | 50–39 | 56–37 | 46–47 | 35–60 | 46–43 |
| Edinburgh Monarchs | 56–36 | | 57–35 | 48–42 | 55–38 | 64–29 | 55–41 | 52–29 | 57–36 | 39–54 | 56–37 | 56–37 | 52–41 |
| Glasgow Tigers | 50–39 | 52–40 | | 42–33 | 44–46 | 45–45 | 49–41 | 49–41 | 51–36 | 55–38 | 54–39 | 45–45 | 45–45 |
| Ipswich Witches | 59–31 | 48–41 | 64–29 | | 48–42 | 47–43 | 53–40 | 46–44 | 44–46 | 42–52 | 54–40 | 51–39 | 39–51 |
| Leicester Lions | 49–45 | 45–44 | 53–39 | 47–43 | | 46–44 | 53–43 | 50–43 | 51–39 | 49–43 | 51–39 | 50–43 | 54–42 |
| Newcastle Diamonds | 55–39 | 53–39 | 62–31 | 48–42 | 62–31 | | 64–30 | 54–39 | 62–30 | 53–37 | 54–38 | 51–42 | 50–40 |
| Plymouth Devils | 53–35 | 57–36 | 49–41 | 47–43 | 51–39 | 44–46 | | 42–48 | 52–41 | 47–43 | 55–38 | 43–47 | 45–45 |
| Redcar Bears | 63–26 | 54–41 | 49–40 | 43–47 | 59–35 | 48–42 | 59–36 | | 45–45 | 46–46 | 48–42 | 43–47 | 44–49 |
| Rye House Rockets | 59–34 | 58–35 | 58–33 | 43–50 | 43–47 | 43–50 | 52–41 | 41–49 | | 49–40 | 56–40 | 34–38 | 47–43 |
| Scunthorpe Scorpions | 48–42 | 55–37 | 54–37 | 61–31 | 51–42 | 48–42 | 54–39 | 55–38 | 58–34 | | 51–42 | 50–40 | 49–40 |
| Sheffield Tigers | 42–51 | 43–47 | 47–48 | 50–42 | 58–37 | 54–38 | 50–43 | 47–43 | 51–39 | 43–47 | | 48–45 | 51–42 |
| Somerset Rebels | 53–41 | 48–42 | 58–34 | 50–40 | 51–39 | 48–45 | 52–41 | 57–36 | 52–43 | 48–42 | 63–28 | | 59–31 |
| Workington Comets | 54–39 | 58–34 | 44–42 | 48–41 | 56–36 | 48–44 | 65–29 | 53–39 | 56–40 | 52–38 | 51–38 | 45–44 | |

Legend: Blue = home team win; Yellow = draw; Red = away team win.

== Final league table ==
| Pos | Team | P | 3w | 2w | D | L | 4w | 3w | D | 1L | L | F | A | Pts |
|---|---|---|---|---|---|---|---|---|---|---|---|---|---|---|
| 1 | Newcastle Diamonds | 24 | 11 | 1 | 0 | 0 | 1 | 1 | 1 | 7 | 2 | 1179 | 1019 | 51 |
| 2 | Scunthorpe Scorpions | 24 | 10 | 2 | 0 | 0 | 2 | 1 | 1 | 3 | 5 | 1151 | 1043 | 50 |
| 3 | Somerset Rebels | 24 | 9 | 3 | 0 | 0 | 1 | 2 | 1 | 3 | 5 | 1170 | 1027 | 48 |
| 4 | Workington Comets | 24 | 9 | 3 | 0 | 0 | 1 | 1 | 2 | 2 | 6 | 1142 | 1045 | 46 |
| 5 | Edinburgh Monarchs | 24 | 10 | 1 | 0 | 1 | 1 | 1 | 0 | 2 | 8 | 1133 | 1066 | 41 |
| 6 | Leicester Lions | 24 | 7 | 5 | 0 | 0 | 0 | 3 | 0 | 1 | 8 | 1079 | 1128 | 41 |
| 7 | Ipswich Witches | 24 | 6 | 3 | 0 | 3 | 1 | 1 | 0 | 4 | 6 | 1088 | 1080 | 35 |
| 8 | Glasgow Tigers | 24 | 8 | 0 | 3 | 1 | 0 | 1 | 0 | 1 | 10 | 1031 | 1132 | 31 |
| 9 | Redcar Bears | 24 | 5 | 2 | 2 | 3 | 1 | 1 | 0 | 2 | 8 | 1078 | 1107 | 30 |
| 10 | Berwick Bandits | 24 | 6 | 2 | 0 | 4 | 1 | 0 | 0 | 2 | 9 | 1045 | 1156 | 28 |
| 11 | Rye House Rockets | 24 | 6 | 2 | 0 | 4 | 0 | 1 | 1 | 0 | 10 | 1065 | 1133 | 27 |
| 12 | Sheffield Tigers | 24 | 6 | 2 | 0 | 4 | 0 | 1 | 0 | 1 | 10 | 1052 | 1161 | 26 |
| 13 | Plymouth Devils | 24 | 6 | 2 | 1 | 3 | 0 | 0 | 0 | 0 | 12 | 1048 | 1164 | 23 |

== Play Offs ==
Group 1

| Pos | Team | P | 3w | 2w | D | L | 4w | 3w | D | 1L | L | F | A | Pts |
|---|---|---|---|---|---|---|---|---|---|---|---|---|---|---|
| 1 | Scunthorpe Scorpions | 4 | 2 | 0 | 0 | 0 | 0 | 0 | 0 | 1 | 1 | 202 | 160 | 7 |
| 2 | Workington Comets | 3 | 1 | 1 | 0 | 0 | 0 | 0 | 0 | 0 | 1 | 124 | 145 | 5 |
| 3 | Edinburgh Monarchs | 3 | 0 | 1 | 0 | 0 | 0 | 0 | 0 | 1 | 1 | 126 | 147 | 3 |

Group 2

| Pos | Team | P | 3w | 2w | D | L | 4w | 3w | D | 1L | L | F | A | Pts |
|---|---|---|---|---|---|---|---|---|---|---|---|---|---|---|
| 1 | Somerset Rebels | 4 | 2 | 0 | 0 | 0 | 0 | 0 | 0 | 2 | 0 | 193 | 172 | 8 |
| 2 | Newcastle Diamonds | 4 | 1 | 1 | 0 | 0 | 0 | 0 | 0 | 0 | 2 | 179 | 186 | 5 |
| 3 | Leicester Lions | 4 | 1 | 1 | 0 | 0 | 0 | 0 | 0 | 0 | 2 | 176 | 190 | 5 |

Scoring

- Home draw = 1 point
- Home win by any number of points = 3
- Away loss by 6 points or less = 1
- Away draw = 2
- Away win by between 1 and 6 points = 3
- Away win by 7 points or more = 4

== Play Off final ==
First leg

26 October 2012

| Somerset Rebels Claus Vissing 10 Jesper B Monberg 9 James Wright 8 Alex Davies 7 XCraig Cook (guest) 7 Kyle Newman 7 Lewis Kerr (guest) 1 | 49 – 44 | Scunthorpe Scorpions Nick Morris 10 Michael Palm Toft 9 Josh Auty 9 Ashley Birks 7 Anders Mellgren (guest) 5 Gary Irving 4 Thomas Jorgensen R/R |

Oaktree Arena

Second leg

29 October 2012

| Scunthorpe Scorpions Nick Morris 12 Michael Palm Toft 12 Josh Auty 10 Gary Irving 7 Ashley Birks 5 Jason Bunyan (guest) 2 David Howe R/R | 48 – 42 | Somerset Rebels Jesper B Monberg 10 Alex Davies 8 Claus Vissing 7 James Wright 7 Richard Hall (guest) 6 Kyle Newman 5 Lewis Kerr (guest) 0 |

Eddie Wright Raceway

Scunthorpe were declared League Champions, winning on aggregate 92–91.

== Premier League Knockout Cup ==
The 2012 Premier League Knockout Cup was the 45th edition of the Knockout Cup for tier two teams. Newcastle Diamonds were the winners of the competition.

First round

| Date | Team one | Score | Team two |
|---|---|---|---|
| 25/05 | Edinburgh | 59-31 | Rye House |
| 27/05 | Glasgow | 54-36 | Plymouth |
| 24/05 | Ipswich | 48-42 | Somerset |
| 28/05 | Newcastle | 58-32 | Redcar |
| 18/05 | Plymouth | 52-38 | Glasgow |
| 24/05 | Redcar | 49-41 | Newcastle |
| 26/05 | Rye House | 49-41 | Edinburgh |
| 18/05 | Scunthorpe | 44-46 | Workington |
| 01/06 | Somerset | 47-43 | Ipswich |
| 19/05 | Workington | 48-42 | Scunthorpe |

Quarter-finals

| Date | Team one | Score | Team two |
|---|---|---|---|
| 19/08 | Leicester | 54-42 | Workington |
| 22/07 | Workington | 54-36 | Leicester |
| 06/07 | Edinburgh | 52-38 | Glasgow |
| 01/07 | Newcastle | 62-28 | Sheffield |
| 01/07 | Glasgow | 44-46 | Edinburgh |
| 30/06 | Berwick | 34-56 | Ipswich |
| 28/06 | Sheffield | 58-32 | Newcastle |
| 28/06 | Ipswich | 48-42 | Berwick |

Semi-finals

| Date | Team one | Score | Team two |
|---|---|---|---|
| 20/10 | Workington | 51-39 | Newcastle |
| 14/10 | Newcastle | 54-36 | Workington |
| 12/10 | Edinburgh | 52-37 | Ipswich |
| 04/10 | Ipswich | 55-35 | Edinburgh |

=== Final ===
First leg

27 October 2012

| Ipswich Witches Leigh Lanham 10 Dakota North 9 Mat Tresarrieu 9 Morten Risager 5 Rohan Tungate 5 Taylor Poole 3 Stefan Nielsen (guest) 1 | 42 – 48 | Newcastle Diamonds Claes Nedermark 10 Christian Henry 9 Matthew Wethers (guest) 8 Mark Lemon 7 Ludvig Lindgren 6 Stuart Robson 5 Paul Starke (guest) 3 |

Foxhall Stadium

Second leg

28 October 2012

| Newcastle Diamonds Stuart Robson 12 Ludvig Lindgren 12 Claes Nedermark 10 Mark Lemon 9 Matthew Wethers (guest) 8 Christian Henry 5 Paul Starke (guest) 2 | 58 – 32 | Ipswich Witches Leigh Lanham 9 Dakota North 9 Stefan Nielsen (guest) 6 Morten Risager 5 Mat Tresarrieu 2 Rohan Tungate 1 Taylor Poole 0 |

Newcastle Stadium

Newcastle were declared Knockout Cup Champions, winning on aggregate 106–74.

== Riders' Championship ==
Craig Cook won the Riders' Championship. The final was held on 14 October at Owlerton Stadium.

| Pos. | Rider | Pts | Total | SF | Final |
|---|---|---|---|---|---|
| 1 | (England) Craig Cook | 3 3 2 2 2 | 12 | - | 3 |
| 2 | (Sweden) Anders Mellgren | 3 1 1 3 1 | 9 | 3 | 2 |
| 3 | (Australia) Jason Doyle | 1 2 3 2 3 | 11 | 2 | 1 |
| 4 | (Denmark) René Bach | 2 3 2 1 3 | 11 | - | 0 |
| 5 | (England) Leigh Lanham | 2 3 1 2 3 | 11 | 1 | |
| 6 | (England) Josh Auty | 2 1 2 3 3 | 11 | 0 | |
| 7 | (Australia) Nick Morris | 0 0 3 3 2 | 8 | | |
| 8 | (England) Richard Lawson | 3 2 0 1 2 | 8 | | |
| 9 | (England) Stuart Robson | 3 1 3 0 ef | 7 | | |
| 10 | (Sweden) Sebastian Aldén | 0 0 3 3 1 | 7 | | |
| 11 | (England) Richard Hall | 2 3 0 ef 2 | 7 | | |
| 12 | (Finland) Kauko Nieminen | 1 2 1 2 0 | 6 | | |
| 13 | (Denmark) Ulrich Østergaard | r 2 0 1 1 | 4 | | |
| 14 | (United States) Ryan Fisher | 1 0 2 1 0 | 4 | | |
| 15 | (Netherlands) Theo Pijper | 1 0 1 0 1 | 3 | | |
| 16 | (Scotland) James Grieves | 0 1 0 0 0 | 1 | | |

- f=fell, r-retired, ex=excluded, ef=engine failure t=touched tapes

== Pairs ==
The Premier League Pairs Championship was held at Oaktree Arena on 24 August. The event was won by Workington Comets.

Group A
| Pos | Team | Pts | Riders |
|---|---|---|---|
| 1 | Workington | 23 | Roynon 14, Bach 9 |
| 2 | Leicester | 22 | Nieminen 13, Bjerre 9 |
| 3 | Newcastle | 18 | Lindgren 13, Lemon 5 |
| 4 | Plymouth | 14 | Fisher 10, Gathercole 4 |
| 5 | Redcar | 13 | Summers 11, Johnson (G) 2 |

Group B
| Pos | Team | Pts | Riders |
|---|---|---|---|
| 1 | Scunthorpe | 25 | Auty 13, Jorgensen 12 |
| 2 | Somerset | 20 | Doyle 13, Wright 7 |
| 3 | Edinburgh | 19 | Tully 13, Pijper 6 |
| 4 | Glasgow | 14 | Grajczonek 9, Screen 5 |
| 5 | Sheffield | 12 | Wells 10, Hall 2 |

Semi finals

- Sheffield bt Edinburgh 5–4
- Workington bt Somerset 6–3

Final

- Workington bt Scunthorpe 7–2

== Fours ==
Berwick Bandits won the Premier League Four-Team Championship for the second time. The final was held on 15 July 2012, at the East of England Arena.

Group A
| Pos | Team | Pts | Riders |
|---|---|---|---|
| 1 | Berwick | 16 | Ashworth 5, Alden 4, Complin 4, Bellego 3 |
| 2 | Plymouth | 14 | Barker 6, Gathercole 5, Fisher 2, Kurtz 1 |
| 3 | Newcastle | 12 | Henry 6, Robson 3, Lindgren 2, Nedermark 1 |
| 4 | Redcar | 6 | Summers 4, Kus 2, Ostergaard 0, Sedgmen 0, Wilkinson 0 |

Group B
| Pos | Team | Pts | Riders |
|---|---|---|---|
| 1 | Workington | 15 | Bach 5, Roynon 5, Lawson 4, Ingalls 1, Howarth 0 |
| 2 | Leicester | 12 | Nieminen 6, Karlsson 6, Graversen 4, Bjerre 4 |
| 3 | Somerset | 12 | Vissing 4, Doyle 4, Wright 2, Masters 2 |
| 4 | Glasgow | 9 | Screen 5, Campton 2, Grajczonek 1, Grieves 1 |

Final
| Pos | Team | Pts | Riders |
|---|---|---|---|
| 1 | Berwick | 23 | Alden 9, Ashworth 8, Bellego 5, Complin 1 |
| 2 | Leicester | 20 | Nieminen 6, Karlsson 6, Graversen 4, Bjerre 4 |
| 3 | Workington | 16 | Lawson 6, Bach 5, Roynon 4, Ingalls 1, Howarth 0 |
| 4 | Plymouth | 13 | Barker 7, Gathercole 3, Fisher 3, Kurtz 0, Holder 0 |

== Final Leading averages ==
| Rider | Team | Average |
|---|---|---|
| (Australia) Jason Doyle | Somerset | 10.15 |
| (England) Ben Barker | Plymouth | 10.05 |
| (England) Craig Cook | Edinburgh | 9.99 |
| (England) Joe Screen | Glasgow | 9.48 |
| (Denmark) Charlie Gjedde | Rye House | 9.22 |
| (England) Ricky Ashworth | Berwick | 9.20 |
| (England) Josh Auty | Scunthorpe | 8.79 |
| (United States) Ryan Fisher | Plymouth | 8.75 |
| (England) Adam Roynon | Edinburgh | 8.83 |
| (England) Richard Lawson | Workington | 8.69 |

== Riders & final averages ==
Berwick

- Ricky Ashworth 9.20
- Sebastian Aldén 8.12
- Lee Complin 7.73
- Robin Aspegren 7.59
- Micky Dyer 6.72
- David Bellego 5.95
- Alex Edberg 5.77
- Nicki Barrett 5.53
- Luboš Tomíček Jr. 5.23
- Jason King 3.70
- Klaus Jakobsen 3.19

Edinburgh

- Craig Cook 9.99
- Theo Pijper 8.28
- Andrew Tully7.40
- Matthew Wethers 7.04
- Derek Sneddon 6.37
- József Tabaka 5.95
- Charles Wright 4.36
- Micky Dyer 4.12
- Marcel Helfer 3.86
- James Sarjeant 1.60

Glasgow

- Joe Screen 9.48
- Josh Grajczonek 7.78
- James Grieves 7.61
- Henning Bager 6.20
- Mason Campton 5.52
- Charles Wright 5.13
- Robert Ksiezak 4.52
- Filip Šitera 4.52
- Jade Mudgway 3.58
- Chris Mills 3.50
- James McBain 2.62
- Jayden O'Malley 2.19

Ipswich

- Dakota North 7.80
- Kevin Doolan 7.71
- Leigh Lanham 7.67
- Rohan Tungate 7.22
- Morten Risager 7.19
- Mathieu Trésarrieu 6.70
- Cameron Heeps 5.92
- Taylor Poole 4.90
- Stefan Nielsen 4.32

Leicester

- Kauko Nieminen 8.60
- Lasse Bjerre 7.85
- Magnus Karlsson 7.21
- Linus Eklöf 6.83
- Simon Nielsen 5.83
- Jan Graversen 5.52
- Jari Makinen 4.99
- Simon Lambert 4.86
- Lewis Blackbird 2.19

Newcastle

- Richie Worrall 8.62
- Stuart Robson 8.25
- Mark Lemon 7.84
- Ludvig Lindgren 7.62
- Christian Henry 7.48
- Claes Nedermark 7.33
- Steve Worrall 5.41
- Paul Starke 3.00

Plymouth

- Ben Barker 10.05
- Ryan Fisher 8.75
- Cory Gathercole 6.88
- Todd Kurtz 5.61
- Nicki Glanz 4.49
- Robert Ksiezak 4.31
- James Holder 3.97
- Guglielmo Franchetti 3.70
- Jake Anderson 3.57
- Ben Reade 2.08

Redcar

- Kevin Doolan 8.41
- Aaron Summers 8.08
- Ulrich Østergaard 8.05
- Matěj Kůs 7.57
- Justin Sedgmen 6.06
- Carl Wilkinson 5.78
- Max Dilger 5.41
- Mark Jones 4.00
- Jade Mudgway 3.39

Rye House

- Charlie Gjedde 8.44
- Jordan Frampton 7.38
- Anders Mellgren 7.08
- Luke Bowen 6.92
- Jason Bunyan 6.39
- Jason Garrity 5.94
- Kasper Lykke 5.60
- Ritchie Hawkins 5.48
- Simon Lambert 4.93
- Ben Morley 4.11

Scunthorpe

- Josh Auty 8.79
- Nick Morris 8.51
- Thomas Jørgensen 7.42
- David Howe 6.81
- Ashley Birks 6.73
- Michael Palm Toft 6.32
- Tero Aarnio 6.12
- Gary Irving 5.48
- Jerran Hart 3.86

Sheffield

- Richard Hall 7.49
- Josef Franc 7.38
- Ricky Wells 7.20
- Emiliano Sanchez 6.81
- Hugh Skidmore 6.60
- Jo Haines 6.13
- Chris Schramm 4.59

Somerset

- Jason Doyle 10.15
- Jesper Monberg 8.49
- Sam Masters 8.15
- Claus Vissing 7.61
- James Wright 6.83
- Kyle Newman 6.35
- Alex Davies 6.15
- Tom Perry 4.27

Workington

- Adam Roynon 8.83
- Richard Lawson 8.69
- Rene Bach 8.67
- Rusty Harrison 7.19
- Kyle Howarth 6.85
- Kenny Ingalls 6.32
- Tero Aarnio 6.02
- Gary Irving 5.52
- Ashley Morris 3.91

== See also ==
- List of United Kingdom Speedway League Champions
- Knockout Cup (speedway)
