= 2009 National League speedway season =

British motorcycle speedway season

- League: National League
- Champions: Bournemouth Buccaneers
- Knockout Cup: Bournemouth Buccaneers
- Individual: Craig Cook
- Pairs: Newport Hornets
- National Trophy: Plymouth Devils
- Division/s above: 2009 Elite League; 2009 Premier League

The 2009 National League speedway season was the third tier/division of British speedway and was contested by ten teams. Bournemouth Buccaneers were champions. It was the first season under the new name after previously been known as the Conference League.

== Final table ==
Pos	Team	PL	W	D	L	BP	Pts
1	Bournemouth Buccaneers	18	15	1	2	21	52
2	Weymouth Wildcats	18	10	1	7	14	35
3	Plymouth Devils	18	9	3	6	12	33
4	Buxton Hitmen	18	9	1	8	11	30
5	Isle of Wight Islanders	18	9	0	9	11	29
6	Scunthorpe Saints	18	7	2	9	7	23
7	Newport Hornets	18	6	2	10	8	22
8	King's Lynn Barracudas	18	7	1	10	7	22
9	Mildenhall Fen Tigers	18	6	1	11	8	21
10	Rye House Cobras	18	6	0	12	4	16

PL = Matches; W = Wins; D = Draws; L = Losses; BP = Bonus Pts Pts = Total Points

== Fixtures and results ==
Home \ Away	BB	BUX	IOW	KL	MIL	NEW	PD	RYE	SCU	WEY
Bournemouth Buccaneers		62–32	51–41	57–39	59–35	60–32	62–33	60–34	52–43	56–36
Buxton Hitmen	54–40		53–39	63–30	58–37	46–46	50–40	53–40	39–51	56–40
Isle of Wight Islanders	41–49	51–42		59–36	58–34	53–41	35–36	54–39	59–35	50–40
King's Lynn Barracudas	32–59	54–39	68–25		42–51	46–46	51–39	53–38	55–38	46–44
Mildenhall Fen Tigers	42–48	44–46	55–37	49–40		42–52	45–45	59–31	43–49	57–35
Newport Hornets	39–50	47–25	48–41	43–47	52–40		48–42	42–48	48–43	42–51
Plymouth Devils	49–43	55–38	61–30	57–37	60–35	53–41		59–35	60–35	45–45
Rye House Cobras	47–49	36–54	41–49	47–43	41–52	48–44	48–44		57–37	52–41
Scunthorpe Saints	46–46	49–44	42–53	52–43	57–38	51–42	45–45	45–43		42–51
Weymouth Wildcats	41–49	59–33	54–42	63–30	63–32	54–38	51–42	57–35	68–23	

Legend: Blue = home team win; Yellow = draw; Red = away team win.

== Play Offs ==
Top four teams race off in two-legged semi-finals and final to decide championship. The winner was Bournemouth Buccaneers who defeated the Plymouth Devils in the final.

Semi-finals

Date	Team one	Score	Team two
21/09	Bournemouth	63-30	Weymouth
27/09	Buxton	52-41	Plymouth
02/10	Plymouth	56-38	Buxton
09/10	Weymouth	43-30	Bournemouth

Final

28 October	Bournemouth Buccaneers; Jerran Hart 18; Andrew Aldridge 11; Aaron Baseby 11; Jay Herne 11; Danny Warwick 9 Mark Baseby 2 Kyle Newman R/R	62–34	Plymouth Devils; Kyle Hughes 11; Seemond Stephens 8 Paul Starke 8 Matt Bates 3 Craig Cook (guest) 3 Jamie Pickard 1 David Gough 0	Wimborne Road

30 October	Plymouth Devils; Seemond Stephens 13; Kyle Hughes 11; Matt Bates 7 Paul Starke 6 Adam Allott (guest) 5 Jamie Pickard 4 David Gough 2	48–42	Bournemouth Buccaneers; Jerran Hart 18; Aaron Baseby 7 Mark Baseby 7 Jay Herne 5 Andrew Aldridge 4 Danny Warwick 1 John Resch 0 Kyle Newman R/R	Plymouth Coliseum

== Final Leading averages ==
Rider	Team	Average
Simon Lambert	Scunthorpe	10.54
Jamie Smith	King's Lynn	10.34
Nick Simmons	Isle of Wight	9.95

== National League Knockout Cup ==
The 2009 National League Knockout Cup was the 12th edition of the Knockout Cup for tier three teams but the first under its new name. Bournemouth Buccaneers were the winners.

First round

Date	Team one	Score	Team two
10/04	King's Lynn	53-37	Mildenhall
12/04	Mildenhall	46-46	King's Lynn
26/04	Newport	31-59	Bournemouth
30/04	Bournemouth	55-38	Newport

Quarter-finals

Date	Team one	Score	Team two
08/05	Plymouth	63-29	Isle of Wight
26/05	Isle of Wight	58-34	Plymouth
25/05	Rye House	50-44	Buxton
21/06	Buxton	68-22	Rye House
24/07	Scunthorpe	43-47	King's Lynn
31/07	King's Lynn	?	Scunthorpe
19/06	Weymouth	56-40	Bournemouth
02/07	Bournemouth	62-30	Weymouth

Semi-finals

Date	Team one	Score	Team two
25/07	Plymouth	41-49	Bournemouth
13/08	Bournemouth	53-39	Plymouth
11/09	King's Lynn	47-43	Buxton
20/09	Buxton	55-38	King's Lynn

Final

11 October	Buxton Hitmen; Jade Mudgway 18; Adam Allott (guest) 13; Ben Taylor 8 Lewis Dallaway 3 Danny Hodgson 2 Gareth Isherwood 0 Scott James R/R	44–48	Bournemouth Buccaneers; Jerran Hart 18; Aaron Baseby 7 Mark Baseby 7 Jay Herne 5 Andrew Aldridge 4 Danny Warwick 1 John Resch 0 Kyle Newman R/R	Buxton Raceway

15 October	Bournemouth Buccaneers; Jay Herne 14; Jerran Hart 11; Kyle Newman 9 Aaron Baseby 7 Danny Warwick 6 Mark Baseby 5 Andrew Aldridge 5	57–39	Buxton Hitmen; Craig Cook 14; Jade Mudgway 10; Ben Taylor 10; John Resch 3 Danny Hodgson 1 Lewis Dallaway 1 Scott James R/R	Wimborne Road

== National Trophy ==
Pos	Team	P	W	D	L	Pts
1	Plymouth	8	6	0	2	12
2	Weymouth	8	4	0	4	8
3	Mildenhall	8	4	0	4	8
4	Buxton	8	4	0	4	8
5	Isle of Wight	8	2	0	6	4

Home \ Away	BUX	IOW	MIL	PLY	WEY
Buxton		50–40	43–47	48–45	52–43
Isle of Wight	49–44		49–38	45–48	41–55
Mildenhall	44–49	57–37		51–44	51–39
Plymouth	62–32	62–32	59–33		56–38
Weymouth	64–29	45–43	56–38	41–48	

Legend: Blue = home team win; Yellow = draw; Red = away team win.

== Riders' Championship ==
Craig Cook won the Riders' Championship. The final was held on 26 September at Rye House Stadium.

Pos.	Rider	Team	Total
1	Craig Cook	Buxton	14
2	Kyle Hughes	Plymouth	14
3	Jay Herne	Bournemouth	13
4	Jerran Hart	Bournemouth	13
5	Tony Atkin	Newport	8
6	Barrie Evans	Mildenhall	8
7	Simon Lambert	Scunthorpe	8
8	Darren Mallett	King's Lynn	7
9	Danny Halsey	Rye House	6
10	Ben Hopwood	Isle of Wight	6
11	Nick Simmons	Isle of Wight	5
12	Jade Mudgway	Buxton	4
13	Benji Compton	Weymouth	3
14	Mark Simmonds	Plymouth	3
15	Adam Allott	King's Lynn	2
16	James Cockle	Weymouth	0
17	Ben Morley (res)	Rye House	2
18	Dan Blake (res)	Rye House	2

== Pairs ==
The National League Pairs Championship, was held at Smallbrook Stadium, Isle of Wight, on 18 August 2009. The event was won by Tony Atkin and Grant Tregoning of the Newport Wasps.

Group A
Pos	Team	Pts	Riders
1	Newport	26	Atkin 15, Tregoning 11
2	Isle of Wight	21	Simmons 16, Johnson 5
3	Rye House	17	Strudwick 12, Mason 5
4	Scunthorpe	14	Lambert 12, Morris 2
5	King's Lynn	12	Allott 6, Mallett 6

Group B
Pos	Team	Pts	Riders
1	Bournemouth	23	Herne 16, Baseby 7
2	Buxton	20	Cook 15, james 5
3	Plymouth	20	Simmonds 11, Hughes 9
4	Mildenhall	17	Evans 10, Priest 7
5	Weymouth	10	Burrows 5, Cockle 5

Final

- Newport bt Bournemouth 5–4

== Teams and final averages ==
Bournemouth

- Jay Herne 9.03
- Danny Warwick 8.18
- Andrew Aldridge 6.42
- Mark Baseby 6.08
- Kyle Newman 5.21
- Aaron Baseby 4.95
- Jerran Hart 4.83
- John Resch 3.0

Buxton

- Craig Cook 9.28
- Ben Taylor 7.86
- Jade Mudgway 7.42
- Scott James 6.06
- Scott Richardson 5.66
- Gareth Isherwood 5.33
- Lewis Dallaway 4.86
- Danny Hodgson 3.00

Isle Of Wight

- Nick Simmons 9.95
- Matthew Wright 6.91
- Ben Hopwood 6.88
- Chris Johnson 6.46
- Dean Felton 4.42
- Danny Berwick 3.68
- Tom Hill 3.00
- Rikki Mullins 3.00

King's Lynn

- Jamie Smith 10.34
- Adam Allott 9.86
- Darren Mallett 8.80
- Scott Campos 5.33
- Adam Lowe 3.58
- Rhys Naylor 3.50
- Jake Knight 3.00
- Chris Widman 3.00

Mildenhall

- Barrie Evans 8.81
- James Birkinshaw 8.42
- Luke Priest 7.39
- Oliver Rayson 4.59
- Joe Jacobs 3.72
- Taylor Poole 3.00
- Adam Kirby 3.00
- Nick Laurence 3.00

Newport

- Tony Atkin 8.58
- Grant Tregoning 6.75
- Karl Mason 6.73
- Shelby Rutherford 4.64
- Ryan Sedgmen 4.26
- Sam Hurst 4.24
- Marc Owen 3.00
- Tom Young 3.00

Plymouth

- Mark Simmons 9.70
- Seemond Stephens 8.45
- Kyle Hughes 8.42
- Mattie Bates 7.00
- Paul Starke 6.03
- David Gough 3.07
- Danny Stoneman 3.00
- Josh Dingle 3.00

Rye House

- Danny Halsey 6.87
- David Mason 6.45
- Rob Smith 6.22
- Jamie Courtney 6.09
- Lee Strudwick 5.30
- Daniel Blake 4.54
- Ben Morley 4.00
- Michael Bovis 3.00

Scunthorpe

- Simon Lambert 10.54
- Gary Irving 5.55
- Richard Franklin 4.97
- James Sarjeant 4.00
- Kyle Howarth 3.45
- Adam Wrathall 3.33
- John MacPhail 3.00
- Ashley Morris 3.00

Weymouth

- James Cockle 8.70
- Benji Compton 7.73
- Mark Burrows 7.55
- Lee Smethills 6.46
- Terry Day 6.05
- Tim Webster 6.00
- James White-Williams 5.40
- Alex McLeod 3.00

== See also ==
- List of United Kingdom Speedway League Champions
