= 2007 Elite League speedway season =

British motorcycle speedway season

- League: Sky Sports Elite League
- Champions: Coventry Bees
- Knockout Cup: Coventry Bees
- Craven Shield: Coventry Bees
- Elite Shield: Peterborough Panthers
- Individual: Nicki Pedersen
- Pairs: Poole Pirates
- Highest average: Leigh Adams
- Division/s below: Premier League; Conference League

The 2007 Elite League speedway season was the 73rd season of the top division of motorcycle speedway in the United Kingdom and governed by the Speedway Control Bureau (SCB), in conjunction with the British Speedway Promoters' Association (BSPA).

== Season summary ==
In 2007, the league consisted of eleven teams for the start of the season. However on 31 May, the Oxford Cheetahs issued a statement explaining their resignation from the league. Their results were expunged from the table and the season was completed with ten teams. It was the last time that Oxford Cheetahs would compete in the league for 15 years, following the refusal of the landlords to allow speedway at Oxford and the subsequent closure of Oxford Stadium in 2012.

Coventry bounced back to winning ways completing the league and cup double. English duo Scott Nicholls and Chris Harris were once again the main catalysts to the team's success. The United States pair of Rory Schlein and Billy Janniro also added valuable contributions to the Coventry team.

Once again the Australian pair of Leigh Adams and Jason Crump were the best riders during the season and finished first and second in the league averages.

== Final table ==
		M	W	D	L	W	D	L	F	A	Pts	BP	Tot
1	Coventry Bees	36	16	1	1	12	0	6	1819	1463	57	16	73
2	Swindon Robins	36	18	0	0	8	1	9	1853.5	1451.5	53	14	67
3	Peterborough Panthers	36	18	0	0	7	1	10	1757	1501	51	12	63
4	Poole Pirates	36	16	1	1	6	0	12	1761	1514	45	13	58
5	Lakeside Hammers	36	13	1	4	3	1	14	1605	1690	34	8	42
6	Wolverhampton Wolves	36	13	1	4	3	0	15	1602	1685	33	8	41
7	Eastbourne Eagles	36	12	1	5	0	1	17	1624.5	1676.5	26	7	33
8	Reading Racers	36	10	0	8	1	1	16	1497	1779	23	3	26
9	Ipswich Witches	36	9	1	8	0	1	17	1464	1809	20	5	25
10	Belle Vue Aces	36	8	0	10	1	0	17	1439	1853	18	4	22
	Oxford Cheetahs	withdrew											

= Qualified for Play Offs

=== 'A' Fixtures ===
Home \ Away	BV	COV	EAS	IPS	LH	OX	PET	PP	RR	SWI	WOL
Belle Vue Aces		38–54	50–43	49–40	47–43	n/a	39–52	52–38	55–38	34–56	42–48
Coventry Bees	53–39		50–40	57–33	67–25	65–28	50–40	46–44	45–45	44–46	47–43
Eastbourne Eagles	62–29	43–50		45–45	55–38	43–31	44–50	49–41	55–38	56.5–38.5	57–35
Ipswich Witches	65–25	37–56	60–30		44–44	53–40	61–32	35–58	43–47	46–44	49–43
Lakeside Hammers	58–34	52–41	54–36	60–33		51–42	56–37	48–42	52–38	41–50	39–51
Oxford Cheetahs	49–51	28–64	59–34	n/a	39–53		43–46	34–58	40–50	31–59	n/a
Peterborough Panthers	62–31	48–42	49–44	46–28	65–25	61–30		46–43	52–40	58–35	53–40
Poole Pirates	50–43	52–40	52–36	58–34	56–37	57–35	53–40		52–41	45–45	63–27
Reading Racers	48–42	39–53	54–38	60–32	55–35	54–36	56–37	42–51		39–45	49–41
Swindon Robins	68–24	54–40	55–38	68–24	63–29	n/a	52–37	46–44	65–28		58–34
Wolverhampton Wolves	54–39	43–49	51–42	63–29	49–44	60–32	55–38	49–43	54–39	51–42	

Legend: Blue = home team win; Yellow = draw; Red = away team win.

=== 'B' Fixtures ===
Home \ Away	BV	COV	EAS	IPS	LH	PET	PP	RR	SWI	WOL
Belle Vue Aces		34–56	60–29	54–39	39–53	40–52	43–50	56–37	35–58	43–47
Coventry Bees	62–28		49–44	64–29	58–34	45–30	49–42	57–36	55–35	52–41
Eastbourne Eagles	55–37	40–53		47–46	43–49	42–51	53–37	58–35	53–37	50–39
Ipswich Witches	55–35	41–52	46–44		51–42	43–46	41–49	38–52	44–46	52–41
Lakeside Hammers	53–40	42–48	52–40	58–35		45–45	45–47	53–39	53–41	58–35
Peterborough Panthers	47–43	46–44	51–42	62–30	54–36		54–38	60–31	51–42	66–24
Poole Pirates	60–32	43–49	48–46	63–30	57–36	46–44		48–24	50–43	56–36
Reading Racers	46–47	44–49	46–44	50–42	41–49	50–40	39–51		35–57	49–33
Swindon Robins	65–28	51–42	56–36	64–26	62–28	51–42	47–46	57–36		57–36
Wolverhampton Wolves	57–33	42–51	45–45	55–38	52–38	38–54	47–45	59–31	44–45	

Legend: Blue = home team win; Yellow = draw; Red = away team win.

== Play-offs ==
Semi-final decided over one leg. Grand Final decided by aggregate scores over two legs.

Semi-finals

- Coventry Bees 55-38 Poole Pirates
- Swindon Robins 50-42 Peterborough Panthers

=== Final ===
First leg

24 September 2007

Swindon Robins Leigh Adams 12 Damian Baliński 9 Tomasz Chrzanowski 8 Charlie Gjedde 8 Lee Richardson 7 Sebastian Ułamek 3 Andrew Moore 2	49 - 43	Coventry Bees Chris Harris 14 Scott Nicholls 8 Rory Schlein 9 Martin Smolinski 5 Steve Johnston 4 Billy Janniro 3 Oliver Allen r/r

Abbey Stadium

Second leg

1 October 2007

Coventry Bees Rory Schlein 16 Martin Smolinski 10 Scott Nicholls 9 Steve Johnston 9 Chris Harris 8 Billy Janniro 7 Oliver Allen r/r	59 - 34	Swindon Robins Leigh Adams 15 Damian Baliński 5 Tomasz Chrzanowski 5 Charlie Gjedde 3 Sebastian Ułamek 3 Andrew Moore 2 Lee Richardson 1

Brandon Stadium

The Coventry Bees were declared League Champions, winning on aggregate 102-83.

== Elite League Knockout Cup ==
The 2007 Elite League Knockout Cup was the 69th edition of the Knockout Cup for tier one teams. Coventry Bees were the winners of the competition.

First round

Date	Team one	Score	Team two
04/05	Lakeside	50-40	Belle Vue
30/04	Belle Vue	47-46	Lakeside
16/04	Wolverhampton	51-42	Reading
13/04	Oxford	45-45	Ipswich
13/04	Reading	56-34	Wolverhampton
12/04	Ipswich	52-38	Oxford

Quarter-finals

Date	Team one	Score	Team two
15/09	Eastbourne	41-49	Lakeside
14/09	Lakeside	59-33	Eastbourne
13/09	Swindon	55-37	Reading
16/08	Ipswich	49-44	Reading
13/07	Reading Racers	53-40	Ipswich
09/07	Coventry	53-40	Poole
14/06	Swindon	63-27	Peterborough

Semi-finals

Date	Team one	Score	Team two
15/10	Reading Racers	38-54	Swindon
06/10	Lakeside	45-45	Coventry
05/10	Coventry	52-41	Lakeside
19/09	Poole	31-44	Coventry

Final

First leg

26 October 2007

Coventry Bees Billy Janniro 15 Scott Nicholls 11 Chris Harris 9 Rory Schlein 9 Steve Johnston 7 Martin Smolinski 2 Oliver Allen r/r	53 - 40	Swindon Robins Leigh Adams 12 Sebastian Ułamek 11 Damian Baliński 7 Tomasz Chrzanowski 4 Andrew Moore 4 Charlie Gjedde 2 Lee Richardson r/r

Brandon Stadium

Second leg

26 October 2007

Swindon Robins Leigh Adams 16 Sebastian Ułamek 9 Tomasz Chrzanowski 9 Charlie Gjedde 7 Damian Baliński 3 Andrew Moore 0 Lee Richardson r/r	45 - 45	Coventry Bees Chris Harris 11 Steve Johnston 9 Rory Schlein 9 Billy Janniro 7 Scott Nicholls 7 Martin Smolinski 2 Oliver Allen r/r

Abbey Stadium

The Coventry Bees were declared Knockout Cup Champions, winning on aggregate 98-85.

== Craven Shield ==
- End of season competition

First Round

Team one	Team two	Team three	Score
Poole	Lakeside	Reading	52–29–27
Peterborough	Reading	Poole	not held
Reading	Peterborough	Lakeside	31–37–40
Lakeside	Peterborough	Poole	36–43–29

Team one	Team two	Team three	Score
Ipswich	Wolverhampton	Coventry	43–23–42
Coventry	Ipswich	Wolverhampton	31–21–20
Wolverhampton	Coventry	Ipswich	35–49–24

Team one	Team two	Team three	Score
Swindon	Eastbourne	Belle Vue	48–39–21
Eastbourne	Swindon	Belle Vue	37–39–32
Belle Vue	Eastbourne	Swindon	38–38–34

Final

Team one	Team two	Team three	Score
Poole	Coventry	Swindon	35–40–33
Swindon	Poole	Coventry	35–28–45
Coventry	Swindon	Poole	35–50–23

== Riders' Championship ==
Nicki Pedersen won the Riders' Championship for the second time. The final was held at King's Lynn Stadium on 30 August.

Pos.	Rider	Pts	Total	SF	Final
1	(Denmark) Nicki Pedersen	3 3 3 3 2	14	x	3
2	(England) Chris Harris	0 2 3 2 3	10	2	2
3	(Australia) Leigh Adams	3 3 2 2 3	13	x	1
4	(Australia) Davey Watt	3 1 2 3 3	12	3	0
5	(Denmark) Bjarne Pedersen	1 3 1 3 2	10	1	
6	(Poland) Krzysztof Kasprzak	2 2 0 1 3	8	0	
7	(Australia) Troy Batchelor	2 0 3 1 2	8		
8	(Denmark) Hans Andersen	2 3 0 0 2	7		
9	(England) Scott Nicholls	0 2 1 3 1	7		
10	(Australia) Adam Shields	0 1 2 2 1	6		
11	(Australia) Rory Schlein	1 1 3 1 0	6		
12	(Australia) Travis McGowan	3 2 0 0 1	6		
13	(Sweden) Freddie Lindgren	0 1 1 2 1	5		
14	(Czech Republic) Tomáš Topinka	2 0 2 1 0	5		
15	(England) Chris Louis	0 0 1 0 0	1		
16	(England) Chris Mills	1 0 0 0 0	1		

== Pairs ==
The Elite League Pairs Championship was held at the King's Lynn Stadium on 7 April and was won by Poole Pirates.

Group A
Pos	Team	Pts	Riders
1	Reading	22	Hancock 13, McGowan 9
2	Poole	21	Crump 13, Pedersen B 8
3	Coventry	21	Nicholls 11, Schlein 10
4	Eastbourne	18	Pedersen N 15, Bridger 3
5	Ipswich	8	Jansson 6, Louis 2

Group B
Pos	Team	Pts	Riders
1	Peterborough	24	Andersen 16, Iversen 8
2	Swindon	23	Adams 14, Ulamek 9
3	Lakeside	19	Shields 14, Kylmakorpi 5
4	Oxford	12	Jensen 12, Eriksson 0
5	Wolves	12	Karlsson 8, Hamill 4

Semi finals

- Poole 6 Peterborough 3 - Crump, Iversen, Pedersen B, Andersen
- Reading 6 Swindon 3 - McGowan, Adams, Hancock, Ulamek

Final

- Poole 6 Reading 3 - Crump, Hancock, Pedersen B, McGowan

== Leading final averages ==
Rider	Team	Average
(Australia) Leigh Adams	Swindon	10.77
(Australia) Jason Crump	Poole	10.71
(Denmark) Nicki Pedersen	Eastbourne	10.55
(Denmark) Hans Andersen	Peterborough	10.38
(Denmark) Bjarne Pedersen	Poole	9.96
(England) Scott Nicholls	Coventry	9.60
(United States) Greg Hancock	Reading	9.54
(Sweden) Peter Karlsson	Wolverhampton	9.22
(England) Chris Harris	Coventry	8.90
(Australia) Davey Watt	Eastbourne	8.52

== Riders & final averages ==
Belle Vue

- (England) Simon Stead 7.38
- (England) Joe Screen 7.03
- (Sweden) Antonio Lindbäck 6.75
- (Australia) Kevin Doolan 6.25
- (Poland) Adam Skórnicki 6.22
- (England) James Wright 5.54
- (Sweden) Billy Forsberg 5.46
- (Finland) Kai Laukkanen 4.98
- (Australia) Joel Parsons 4.00
- (United States) Ryan Fisher 3.04
- (England) Adam Roynon 1.65

Coventry

- (England) Scott Nicholls 9.60
- (England) Chris Harris 8.90
- (Australia) Rory Schlein 8.15
- (United States) Billy Janniro 6.82
- (Australia) Steve Johnston 6.70
- (Denmark) Morten Risager 6.31
- (England) Oliver Allen 6.29
- (Germany) Martin Smolinski 5.83

Eastbourne

- (Denmark) Nicki Pedersen 10.55
- (Australia) Davey Watt 8.52
- (England) David Norris 6.77
- (England) Dean Barker 6.64
- (Poland) Roman Povazhny 6.29
- (Denmark) Morten Risager 5.49
- (Australia) Cameron Woodward 5.34
- (England) Lewis Bridger 5.33
- (Sweden) Stefan Andersson 5.18
- (Sweden) Simon Gustafsson 4.17

Ipswich

- (England) Chris Louis 7.89
- (Denmark) Jesper B. Jensen 7.25
- (Poland) Robert Miśkowiak 6.82
- (Sweden) Kim Jansson 5.90
- (Germany) Tobias Kroner 5.72
- (Poland) Zbigniew Suchecki 4.07
- (Poland) Marcin Rempała 4.00
- (England) Chris Schramm 3.50

Lakeside

- (Sweden) Andreas Jonsson 9.50
- (Poland) Krzysztof Kasprzak 8.17
- (Australia) Adam Shields 7.86
- (Finland) Joonas Kylmäkorpi 7.32
- (England) Leigh Lanham 6.14
- (England) Chris Neath 5.36
- (Denmark) Henning Bager 5.14
- (Germany) Christian Hefenbrock 5.01
- (England) Paul Hurry 4.77
- (Sweden) Andreas Messing 4.43
- (Sweden) Ricky Kling 4.33
- (Czech Republic) Luboš Tomíček Jr. 4.00

Oxford (withdrew from league)

- (Poland) Piotr Protasiewicz 7.00
- (Denmark) Jesper B Jensen 6.67
- (Australia) Steve Johnston 5.79
- (Czech Republic) Luboš Tomíček Jr. 5.71
- (Sweden) Freddie Eriksson 5.04
- (Sweden) Ricky Kling 4.94
- (England) Andy Smith 4.00
- (Sweden) Eric Andersson 3.88
- (Czech Republic) Aleš Dryml Jr. 3.82

Peterborough

- (Denmark) Hans N. Andersen 10.38
- (Denmark) Kenneth Bjerre 8.38
- (Denmark) Niels Kristian Iversen 7.74
- (Czech Republic) Lukáš Dryml 6.59
- (Poland) Piotr Świderski 6.10
- (England) Danny King 6.03
- (England) Richard Hall 4.46
- (Germany) Christian Hefenbrock 4.46

Poole

- (Australia) Jason Crump 10.71
- (Denmark) Bjarne Pedersen 9.96
- (England) Edward Kennett 6.49
- (Australia) Craig Boyce 6.24
- (Australia) Troy Batchelor 6.22
- (Australia) Jason Doyle 5.11
- (Poland) Piotr Świst 5.00
- (England) Steve Boxall 3.64
- (Australia) Craig Watson 2.26

Reading

- (United States) Greg Hancock 9.54
- (Slovenia) Matej Žagar 8.00
- (Poland) Janusz Kołodziej 7.21
- (Australia) Travis McGowan 6.29
- (Sweden) Jonas Davidsson 5.71
- (Czech Republic) Zdeněk Simota 5.24
- (Australia) Mark Lemon 5.20
- (Poland) Krzysztof Buczkowski 5.05
- (England) Danny Bird 4.81

Swindon

- (Australia) Leigh Adams 10.77
- (England) Lee Richardson 8.48
- (Denmark) Charlie Gjedde 8.31
- (Poland) Sebastian Ułamek 7.62
- (Poland) Tomasz Chrzanowski 7.19
- (Denmark) Mads Korneliussen 6.10
- (England) Andrew Moore 4.59

Wolverhampton

- (Sweden) Peter Karlsson 9.22
- (Sweden) Freddie Lindgren 8.35
- (England) David Howe 7.80
- (United States) Billy Hamill 7.74
- (Scotland) James Grieves 5.20
- (Sweden) Magnus Karlsson 4.37
- (Netherlands) Theo Pijper 4.35
- (Scotland) William Lawson 4.28
- (Denmark) Kenneth Hansen 4.13
- (England) Carl Wilkinson 2.44

== See also ==
- List of United Kingdom Speedway League Champions
- Speedway in the United Kingdom
- Knockout Cup (speedway)
