= Plymouth Gladiators =

British motorcycle speedway team

Club information
- Track address: Plymouth Coliseum; Coypool Road; Plymouth; PL7 4NW
- Country: England
- Founded: 1932
- Promoter: Mark Phillips
- Team manager: Garry May
- Team captain: Ben Barker
- League: SGB Championship
- Website: https://plymouth-speedway.com

Club facts
- Colours: Blue, yellow and black
- Track size: 228 metres
- Track record time: 51.44
- Track record date: 9 August 2025
- Track record holder: Richard Lawson

Current team
Rider	CMA
(England) Danny King	8.58
(England) Joe Thompson	5.87
(Denmark) Tobias Thomsen	4.81
(England) Ben Barker (C)	6.12
(England) Scott Nicholls	7.88
(Czech Republic) Daniel Klíma	4.00
(England) Tom Spencer	2.00
Total	39.26

Major team honours
tier 2 Fours Winners	2016
tier 3 Knockout Cup Winners	1952, 2008
tier 3 Pairs winners	2010
Division 3 Trophy Winners	2009

The Plymouth Gladiators are a speedway team in the British SGB Championship. The team competed during various seasons from 1932 to 1969, before re-forming after a gap of thirty-six years in 2006. In 2021, the club successfully applied to join the British second division, the SGB Championship. The team nicknames have included Tigers, Panthers, Devils and Bulldogs.

== History ==
=== Origins and 1930s ===
The origins of speedway in Plymouth began when Western Speedways Ltd promoted the dirt track racing at Pennycross Stadium. The opening meeting was a challenge match against Exeter on 13 June 1931. The general manager of the stadium Freddie Hore signed Australian Bert Spencer as the first star to ride at Plymouth.

As the Plymouth Tigers the team were founder members of the first National League, competing in the 1932 Speedway National League. The team included seven Australian riders, including Spencer, Eric Collins, Frank Pearce and Clem Mitchell. The team performed woefully, only managing to win two league matches, but improved in 1933 and 1934.

The speedway promotion suffered financial losses and put the entire team up for sale in early 1935, choosing to host a few open and challenge matches instead of competing in the league.

The team returned in 1936 under the promotion of Jack Colebatch, to compete in the Provincial League, and changed their name to Plymouth Panthers. Another poor season resulted in no speedway (with the exception of one fixture) before the outbreak of war.

=== 1940s ===
Although the Pennycross Stadium conducted greyhound racing meetings throughout the war, the speedway did not return until 1947. Now known as the Plymouth Devils, they raced in the 1947 Speedway National League Division Three, under Jimmy Baxter (the chairman of the third division promoters' association).

Pete Lansdale was signed as the club's number 1 rider in 1948, joined by Peter Robinson. Later signings included George Wall and Alan Smith and they finally turned Plymouth into a team that were hard to beat at home.

=== 1950s ===
The club also signed Wally Mawdsley in 1950, who together with Pete Lansdale would later become the best known speedway promoters in the country. In 1952, the team achieved their first major success, winning the Division Three section of the National Trophy. They defeated Rayleigh Rockets in the final and the Devils trio of Wall, Smith and Lansdale finished in the first three positions of the league averages at the end of the season.

After another season in the Southern League (1953) they withdrew from the 1954 Speedway National League Division Two in July, due to financial losses.

=== 1960s ===
Seven years later in 1961, the Bristol Bulldogs were left without a home, following the sale of Knowle Stadium. The Bulldogs relocated to Plymouth and the Plymouth Bulldogs competed in the 1961 Provincial Speedway League. Australian Jack Scott led the team's averages in a season that saw the team finish runner-up in the league behind Poole Pirates. After the 1962 season it would be another six year without speedway in Plymouth.

Speedway resurfaced again for two seasons (1968 and 1969) at Pennycross Stadium, with the Devils participating in British League Division Two. The 1968 season saw the Devils finish fourth and Mike Cake recorded an equal first league average of 10.22. Unfortunately after the 1969 season the speedway ended and Pennycross Stadium would close for good several years later in 1972.

=== 2000s ===
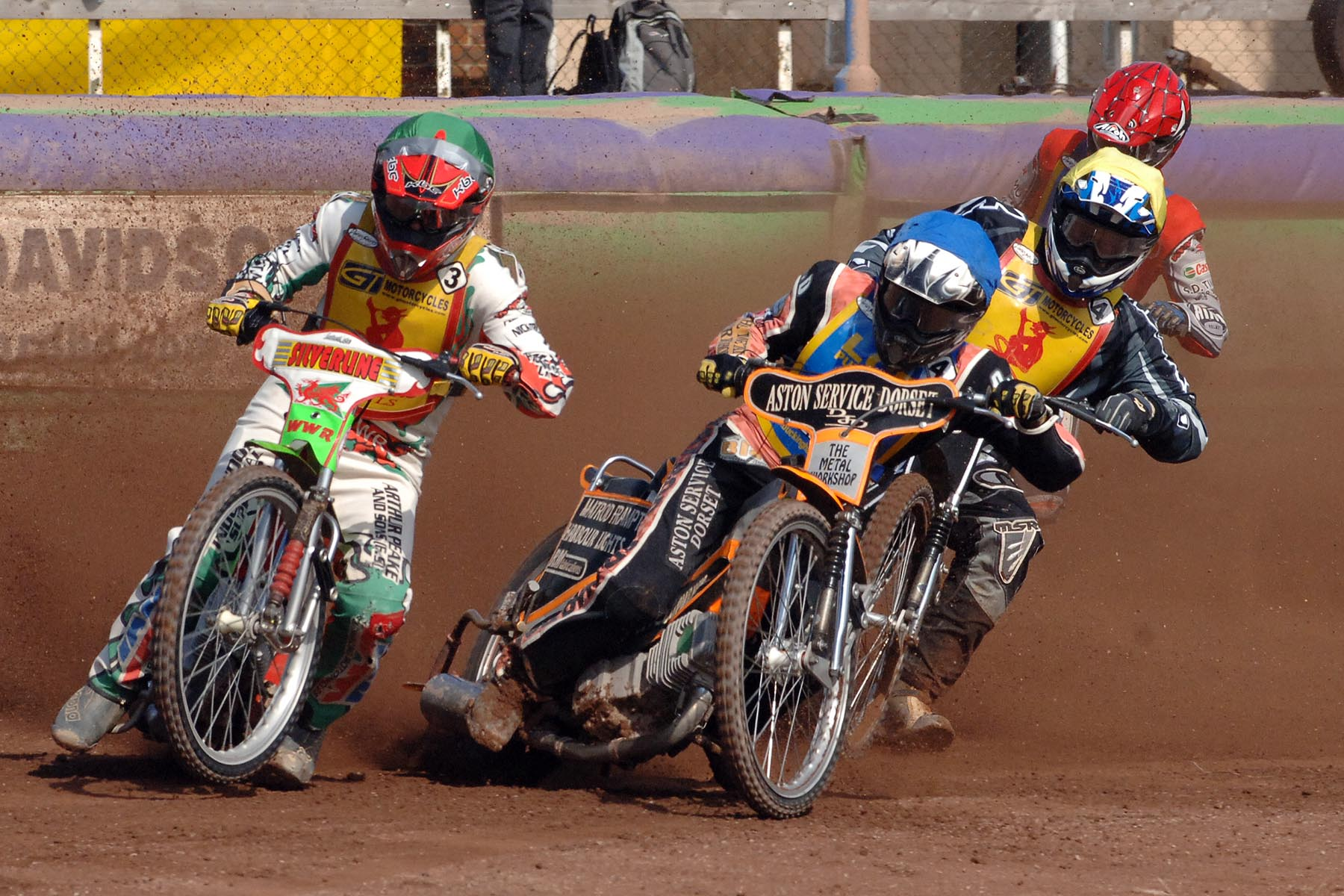
Plymouth versus Oxford in 2007

In 2006, temporary planning permission was awarded for a new speedway track in Plymouth at the St Boniface College playing fields (later to become the Plymouth Coliseum). The Plymouth Devils returned after a 36-year absence to compete in the 2006 Speedway Conference League. During the season the Devils finished first in the regular season table but lost in the play off final to Scunthorpe Scorpions.

Two years later in 2008, they repeated the feat of topping the table but once again lost in the playoffs, this time to Weymouth Wildcats. They did however gain consolation when winning the Conference League Knockout Cup. One year later in 2009, the Devils reached the play off final and won the Division 3 national trophy during the 2009 National League speedway season.

=== 2010s ===
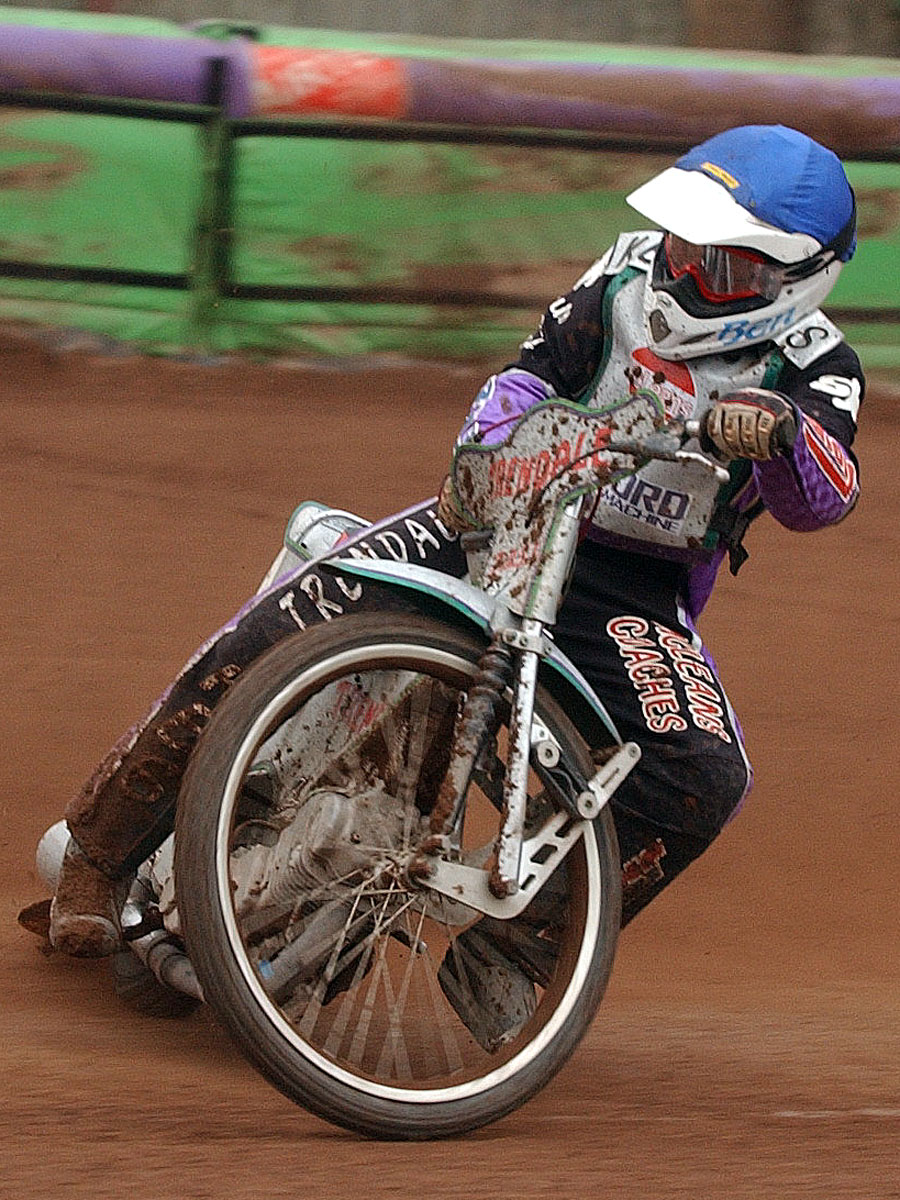
Ben Barker

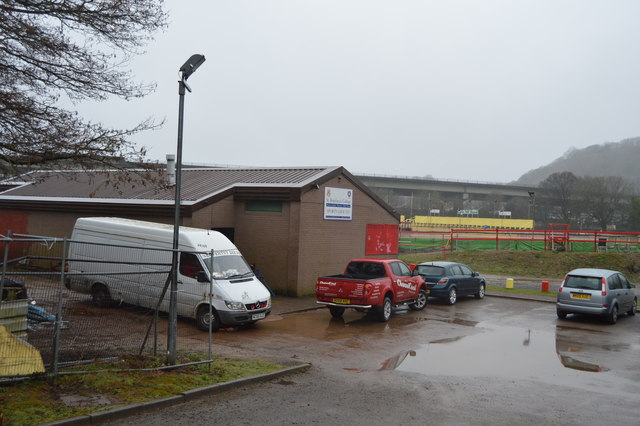
View of the Plymouth Coliseum

In 2010, Nicki Glanz and Mark Simmonds won the National League Pairs Championship, held at Hayley Stadium, on 7 August.

In 2011, the club moved up to division 2 bringing in Ben Barker as number 1. The Devils continued to compete in the second tier and introduced a junior side called the Devon Demons in 2014, previously the Demons had been the junior side for the Exeter Falcons.

During their final season in the second tier the Devils won the Premier League Four-Team Championship, held on 23 and 24 July 2016, at the East of England Arena. The team consisted of the Australian brothers Brady Kurtz and Todd Kurtz in addition to Jack Holder and Kyle Newman. The team dropped back down to division 3 for 2017.

In 2019, the club name was changed from the Devils to the Gladiators.

=== 2020s ===
Following a season lost to the COVID-19 pandemic, the Gladiators returned to the second division for 2021, called the SGB Championship. In 2022, the club re-signed Ben Barker and also ran a NDL side called the Centurions.

== Season summary (1st team) ==
Extended content

Year and league	Position	Notes
1932 Speedway National League	9th	Tigers
1933 Speedway National League	9th	Tigers
1934 Speedway National League	8th	Tigers
1936 Provincial Speedway League	5th	Panthers
1947 Speedway National League Division Three	8th	Devils
1948 Speedway National League Division Three	7th	Devils
1949 Speedway National League Division Three	5th	Devils
1950 Speedway National League Division Two	9th	Devils
1951 Speedway National League Division Three	6th	Devils
1952 Speedway Southern League	3rd	Devils, National Trophy (div 3) winners
1953 Speedway Southern League	8th	Devils
1954 Speedway National League Division Two	N/A	Devils, withdrew
1961 Provincial Speedway League	2nd	Bulldogs
1962 Provincial Speedway League	6th	Devils
1968 British League Division Two season	4th	Devils
1969 British League Division Two season	15th	Devils
2006 Speedway Conference League	1st	Devils, play off final
2007 Speedway Conference League	3rd	Devils
2008 Speedway Conference League	1st	Devils, play off semi final & Knockout Cup winners
2009 National League speedway season	3rd	Devils, play off final, national trophy
2010 National League speedway season	6th	Devils, pairs
2011 Premier League speedway season	13th	Devils
2012 Premier League speedway season	13th	Devils
2013 Premier League speedway season	11th	Devils
2014 Premier League speedway season	9th	Devils
2014 National League speedway season	7th	Demons (juniors)
2015 Premier League speedway season	6th	Devils
2016 Premier League speedway season	12th	Devils, fours
2017 National League speedway season	8th	Devils
2018 National League speedway season	7th	Devils
2019 National Development League speedway season	8th	Gladiators
SGB Championship 2021	10th	Gladiators
SGB Championship 2022	4th	Play off QF, Gladiators
2022 National Development League speedway season	7th	Centurions (juniors)
SGB Championship 2023	9th	Gladiators
SGB Championship 2024	8th	Gladiators
SGB Championship 2025	8th	Gladiators

== Season summary (juniors) ==
Extended content

Year and league	Position	Notes
2025 National Trophy	tbc	Centurions

== Notable riders ==
- (England) Ben Barker
- (England) Mike Cake
- (England) Bill Clibbett
- (Australia) Eric Collins
- (England) Frank Goulden
- (England) Les Gregory
- (Australia) Jack Holder
- (Australia) Brady Kurtz
- (Australia) Todd Kurtz
- (England) Pete Lansdale
- (England) Peter Robinson
- (Australia) Jack Sharp
- (England) Alan Smith
- (Australia) Jack Scott
- (Australia) Bert Spencer
- (England) George Wall

== Riders previous seasons ==
Extended content

2007 team

- (England) Seemond Stephens
- (England) Robert Smith
- (Wales) Tom Brown
- (Wales) Jamie Westacott
- (Denmark) Nicki Glanz
- (England) Tim Webster
- (England) Ben Hopwood
- (England) Billy Legg
- (England) Adam Roynon
- (England) Jaimie Pickard
- (England) Russell Barnet

2008 team

- (England) Seemond Stephens
- (England) Mark Simmonds
- (England) Ben Hopwood
- (Wales) Tom Brown
- (England) Kyle Hughes
- (Denmark) Nicki Glanz
- (England) Paul Starke
- (England) Jaimie Pickard
- (England) Danny Stoneman
- (England) Jamie White-Williams

2009 team

- (England) Seemond Stephens
- (Wales) David Gough
- (England) Kyle Hughes
- (England) Mark Simmonds
- (England) Paul Starke
- (England) Mattie Bates

2010 team

- (Denmark) Nicki Glanz
- (Wales) David Gough
- (England) Seemond Stephens
- (England) Mattie Bates
- (England) Mark Simmonds
- (England) Jaimie Pickard
- (England) Ben Reade
- Also rode
- (England) Paul Starke
- (England) Lee Smethills
- (England) Matt Wright
- (England) Daniel Berwick

2013 team

- (Australia) Ty Proctor
- (Australia) Todd Kurtz
- (Denmark) Mikkel Bech Jensen
- (Australia) Cory Gathercole
- (Australia) Mark Lemon
- (Australia) Jake Anderson
- (Denmark) Simon Nielsen
- Also rode
- (England) Chris Schramm
- (Denmark) Ricky Kling
- (England) Ben Reade

2014 team

- (England) Ben Barker
- (England) James Wright
- (Denmark) Rasmus Jensen
- (England) Kyle Newman
- (Czech Republic) Josef Franc
- (Czech Republic) Sam Simota
- (Hungary) Roland Benko
- Also rode
- (England) Adam Roynon
- (England) Ben Reade
- (Finland) Kalle Katajisto

2015 team

- (United States) Ryan Fisher
- (Australia) Jack Holder
- (Denmark) Morten Risager
- (England) Kyle Newman
- (Czech Republic) Sam Simota
- (Sweden) Linus Eklof
- (Australia) Todd Kurtz
- Also rode
- (England) Ashley Morris
- (England) Sam Champman
- (Hungary) Roland Benko

2016 team

- (Australia) Jack Holder
- (England) Steve Boxall
- (England) Kyle Newman
- (Czech Republic) Sam Simota
- (England) Stefan Nielsen
- (Australia) Todd Kurtz
- (England) Ellis Perks
- Also rode
- (Australia) Brady Kurtz
- (Denmark) Charlie Gjedde

2018 team

- (England) Ellis Perks
- (England) Henry Atkins
- (England) Tim Webster
- (England) Richard Andrews
- (New Zealand) Ryan Terry-Daley
- (England) Kelsey Dugard
- (England) Macauley Leek
- Also rode
- (England) Adam Sheppard
- (England) Adam Roynon
- (England) James Cockle
- (New Zealand) Bradley Andrews

2019 team

- (England) Ben Wilson
- (England) Nathan Stoneman
- (England) Richard Andrews
- (England) Adam Sheppard
- (England) Tom Young
- (England) Jamie Bursill
- (England) Kris Andrews

2021 team

- (England) Alfie Bowtell
- (Australia) Zach Cook
- (Australia) Jason Crump
- (Australia) Zane Keleher
- (England) Richard Lawson
- (Denmark) Bjarne Pedersen
- (United States) Dillon Ruml
- Also Rode
- (England) Henry Atkins
- (England) Jason Edwards
- (France) Steven Goret
- (England) Luke Ruddick
- (England) Jack Smith

2022 team

- (Denmark) Hans Andersen (C)
- (England) Ben Barker
- (England) Connor Coles
- (England) Lee Complin
- (England) Edward Kennett
- (Denmark) Michael Palm Toft
- (England) Ben Morley

Also Rode

- (England) Henry Atkins
- (England) Alfie Bowtell
- (England) Dan Gilkes
- (England) Harry McGurk
