= Cory Gathercole =

Australian speedway rider

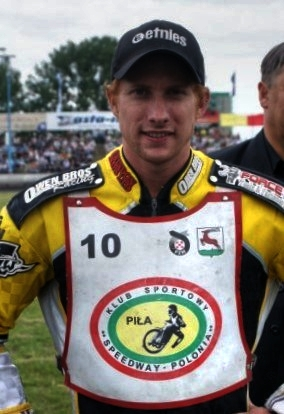
- Born: 2 December 1986 (age 39); Irymple, Victoria
- Nationality: Australian

Career history

Great Britain
- 2007-2008: Isle of Wight Islanders
- 2007-2011, 2013: Swindon Robins
- 2009-2011: Somerset Rebels
- 2012-2013: Plymouth Devils

Poland
- 2009: Polonia Piła
- 2011: Ostrów

Individual honours
- 2007: WA State Champion
- 2007: Victorian State Champion
- 2012: SA State Champion

Team honours
- 2007: Premier League Fours Champion

Cory James Gathercole (born 2 December 1986) is an Australian former motorcycle speedway rider.

== Career ==
Gathercole first came to British speedway when he joined the Swindon Robins squad in the Elite League for the 2007 Elite League speedway season and the Isle of Wight Islanders for the 2007 Premier League speedway season. He was part of the Isle of Wight four who won the Premier League Four-Team Championship, held on 8 July 2007, at the East of England Arena.

Gathercole later rode for Somerset Rebels before joining the Plymouth Devils in the British Premier League.

Gathercole has represented Australia at Under-23 level.

== World Longtrack Championship ==
Qualifying Round

- 2012 – 7th at Tayac (France)
- 2013 – 18th at Mariánské Lázně (Czech Republic)
