= Billy Forsberg =

Swedish speedway rider

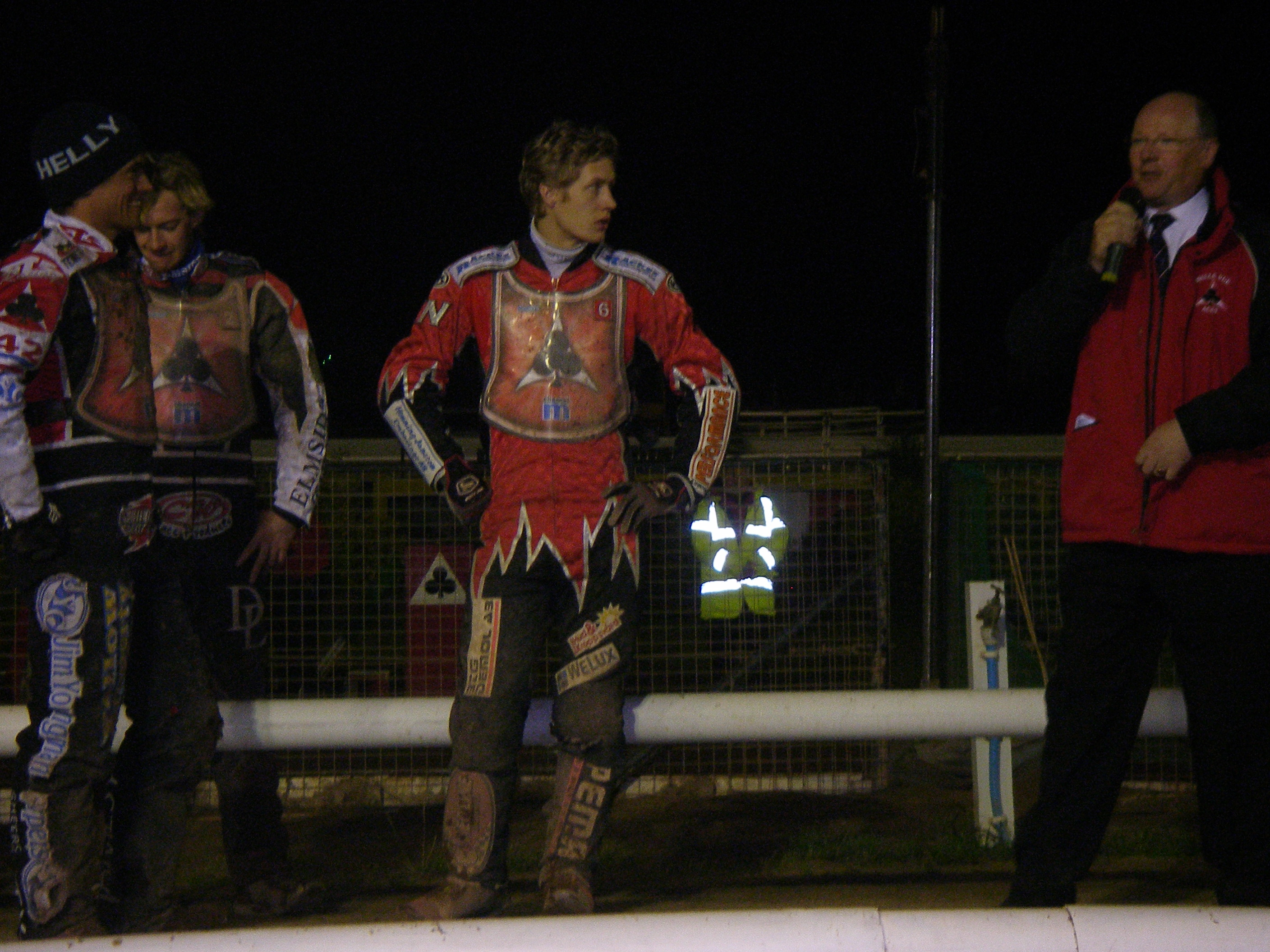
- Born: 13 May 1988 (age 38); Norrköping, Sweden
- Nationality: Swedish

Career history

Great Britain
- 2007-2008: Belle Vue Aces

Poland
- 2007: Gdańsk

Billy Sven Forsberg (born 13 May 1988) is a Swedish former speedway rider.

== Career ==
Forsberg represented the Belle Vue Aces in the British Elite League before his premature retirement at the end of the 2009 following injury. He appeared in a SGP as a wildcard.

== Family ==
Forsberg's grandfather Dan rode for Birmingham Brummies and reached two World finals in 1952 and 1957.
