= Adam Roynon =

British motorcycle speedway rider (born 1988)

- Born: 30 August 1988 (age 38); Barrow, England
- Nationality: British (English)

Career history

Great Britain
- 2003: Swindon
- 2003: Armadale
- 2004, 2021: Newcastle
- 2004–2005: Mildenhall
- 2005: Boston
- 2005–2006: Glasgow
- 2006–2007: Rye House
- 2006: Buxton
- 2007, 2014, 2017–2018: Plymouth
- 2008: Birmingham
- 2010, 2012, 2016–2017: Workington
- 2010: Stoke
- 2010–2011: King's Lynn
- 2011–2012: Dudley
- 2011, 2015, 2022: Redcar
- 2012–2013, 2016: Coventry
- 2013: Leicester
- 2013–2014: Sheffield
- 2014–2015: Peterborough
- 2022: Scunthorpe
- 2023: Poole

Poland
- 2008: Ostrów

Individual honours
- 2006: Conference Riders Champion

Team honours
- 2007: Premier League Champion
- 2004: Conference League Champion
- 2004: Conference Trophy Winner
- 2004: Conference League KO Cup
- 2012: Premier League Pairs
- 2011: National League Fours

Adam Wayne Roynon (born 30 August 1988, in Barrow-in-Furness, Cumbria) is a British motorcycle speedway rider. He earned one international cap for the Great Britain national speedway team.

== Career ==
In 2004, Roynon won three trophies in the Conference League season with Mildenhall Fen Tigers, winning the League Championship, the Conference Trophy and the Knockout Cup.

In 2006, Roynon won the Riders' Championship, held on 9 September at Rye House Stadium.

Roynon won the Premier League Championship with the Rye House Rockets in 2007 and finished third in the Indoor speedway event at Brighton. Roynon was contracted to Elite League team the Coventry Bees, but declined a team place there for 2008.

On 6 March 2009, Roynon crashed while practising with the Great Britain squad at the Norfolk Arena, King's Lynn and suffered a blood clot to his brain and a broken neck (C2 vertebra). His survival chances were initially assessed as 50/50, but his recovery "amazed" doctors who allowed him to leave hospital eleven days later wearing a halo brace. On 30 April 2009 his father announced that halo brace/hyperbaric therapy had been unsuccessful and Roynon would require surgery to stabilise his broken neck, further delaying his return to riding.

Roynon returned in 2010 with Workington Comets but another injury cut short his time there. He rode for Stoke Potters later that season, but suffered a broken ankle. After recovering, he was signed by King's Lynn Stars to replace Joe Haines. In 2011, he was loaned out to Redcar Bears, also riding for Dudley Heathens in the National League, but a broken femur in April saw him again out of action until July. However, after his comeback he was part of the Dudley team that won the National League Fours, held on 30 July 2011 at Loomer Road Stadium.

Roynon signed to ride for Workington Comets and Dudley Heathens in 2012. In 2012, he won the Premier League Pairs Championship partnering René Bach for Workington, during the 2012 Premier League speedway season. However, he broke his leg in the National League playoff final. He signed for Leicester Lions for the 2013 Premier League season and doubled-up in the Elite League with Coventry Bees. He suffered serious concussion in crash in his first match of the season for Coventry, leading to another enforced break from racing. After returning from injury he signed for Sheffield Tigers and in July was reinstated to the Coventry team.

In 2022, Roynon rode for the Scunthorpe Scorpions and Redcar Bears in the SGB Championship 2022 and Plymouth Centurions during the 2022 National Development League speedway season. The following season he signed for Poole Pirates for the SGB Premiership 2023.

== Family ==
Roynon's father, Chris, was a speedway rider and promoter for the Barrow Blackhawks.

== Honours ==
- Individual U-21 World Championship:
  - 2007 - 18th place in Qualifying Round 4 (1 point in 1 heat)
  - 2008 - 11th place in Qualifying Round 2 (7 points)
