= Kyle Hughes =

British motorcycle speedway rider (born 1989)

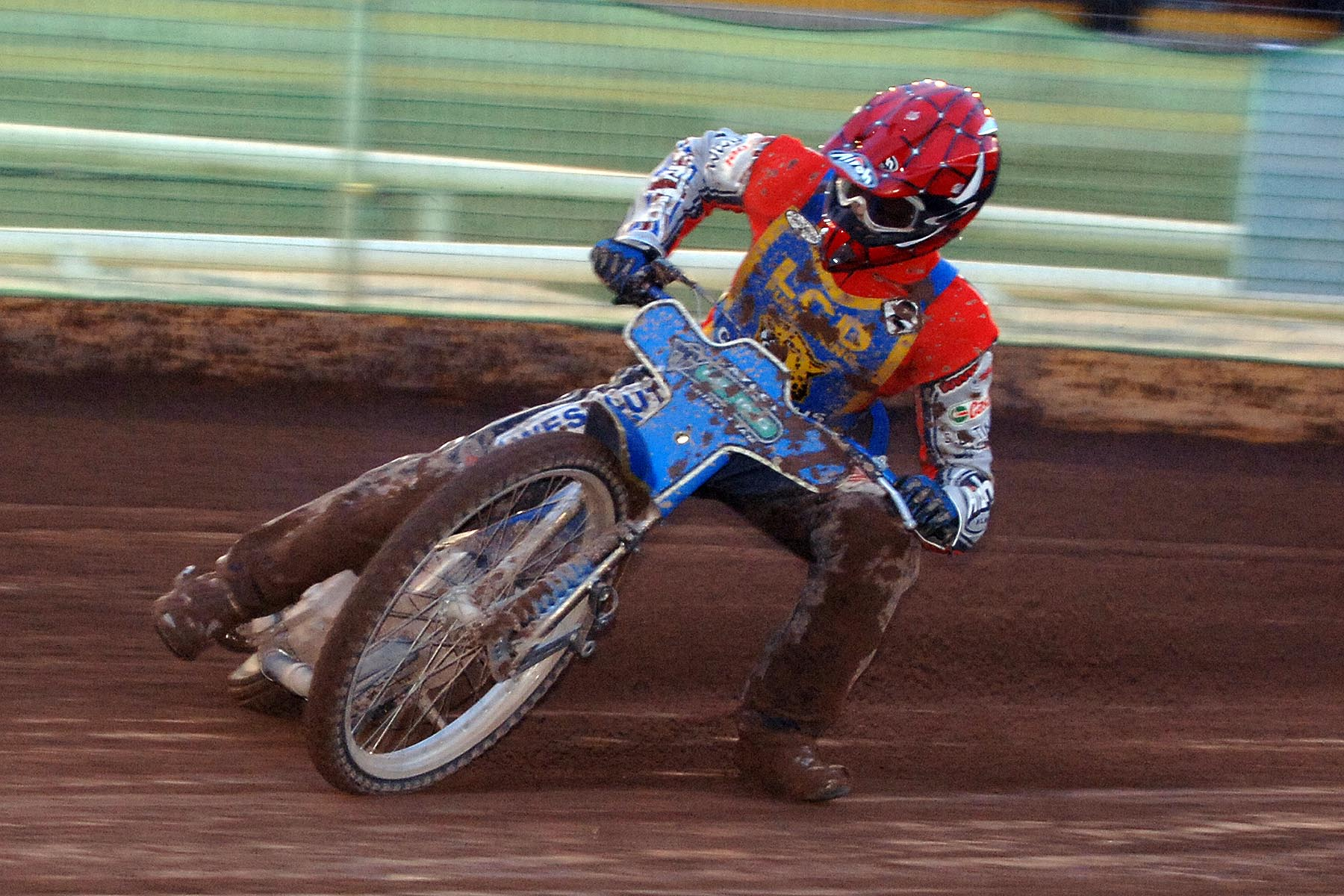
- Born: 15 June 1989 (age 37); Bath, Somerset, England
- Nationality: British (English)

Career history
- 2004: Mildenhall Fen Tigers
- 2005, 2007: Oxford Lions
- 2008: Boston Barracuda-Braves
- 2008: Sheffield Tigers
- 2008-2009, 2011: Plymouth Devils
- 2010, 2015: Rye House Raiders
- 2011: Somerset Rebels
- 2011, 2014: King's Lynn Young Stars
- 2012: Leicester Lions
- 2012: Isle of Wight Islanders
- 2013: Stoke Potters
- 2016: Eastbourne Eagles

Team honours
- 2004, 2005: Conference League Champions
- 2004: Conference Trophy
- 2008: National League KO Cup
- 2009: National Trophy

Kyle Richard Hughes (born 15 June 1989) is a former motorcycle speedway rider from England.

== Biography ==
Born in Bath, Somerset, Hughes' first experience of speedway was at the training track at Reading in 1999. After gaining experience in second-half rides at Swindon, he was part of the Mildenhall Fen Tigers team that won the Conference League in 2004. He won the title again in 2005, this time with Oxford's academy team. He signed for Plymouth Devils in the Conference League and Sheffield Tigers in the Premier in 2008, before a spell with Rye House Rockets which saw him win the National League Rider of the Year award and finish fourth in the British Under 21 Championship in 2010, but also suffering a broken collarbone which required a metal plate to be fitted.

Hughes represented Great Britain at Under-21 level, in a test match against Australasia in 2009.

Hughes returned to Plymouth in 2011, after starting the season with Somerset Rebels. He played a major part in Plymouth's first ever away win in the Premier League, scoring 11 points in the win at Leicester Lions. In July 2011 he won the FAST Golden Hammer tournament at Monmore Green, but was forced to miss part of the season through injury after breaking his other collarbone on 12 August.

In March 2012, Hughes was signed by Leicester Lions as a temporary replacement for the injured Simon Nielsen. He was subsequently loaned to National League team Isle of Wight Islanders, scoring a five ride paid maximum in his first match. In August, after blowing several engines during the season he announced his retirement from the sport for financial reasons.

Hughes' retirement proved to be short-lived as he signed to ride for Stoke Potters in 2013. In 2016, after signing for Eastbourne Eagles he broke his leg during the first match of the season but would return later in the season for Mildenhall Fen Tigers.

== Family ==
Hughes is the cousin of snooker player Stephen Lee.
