= Lee Smethills =

British professional speedway rider (born 1982)

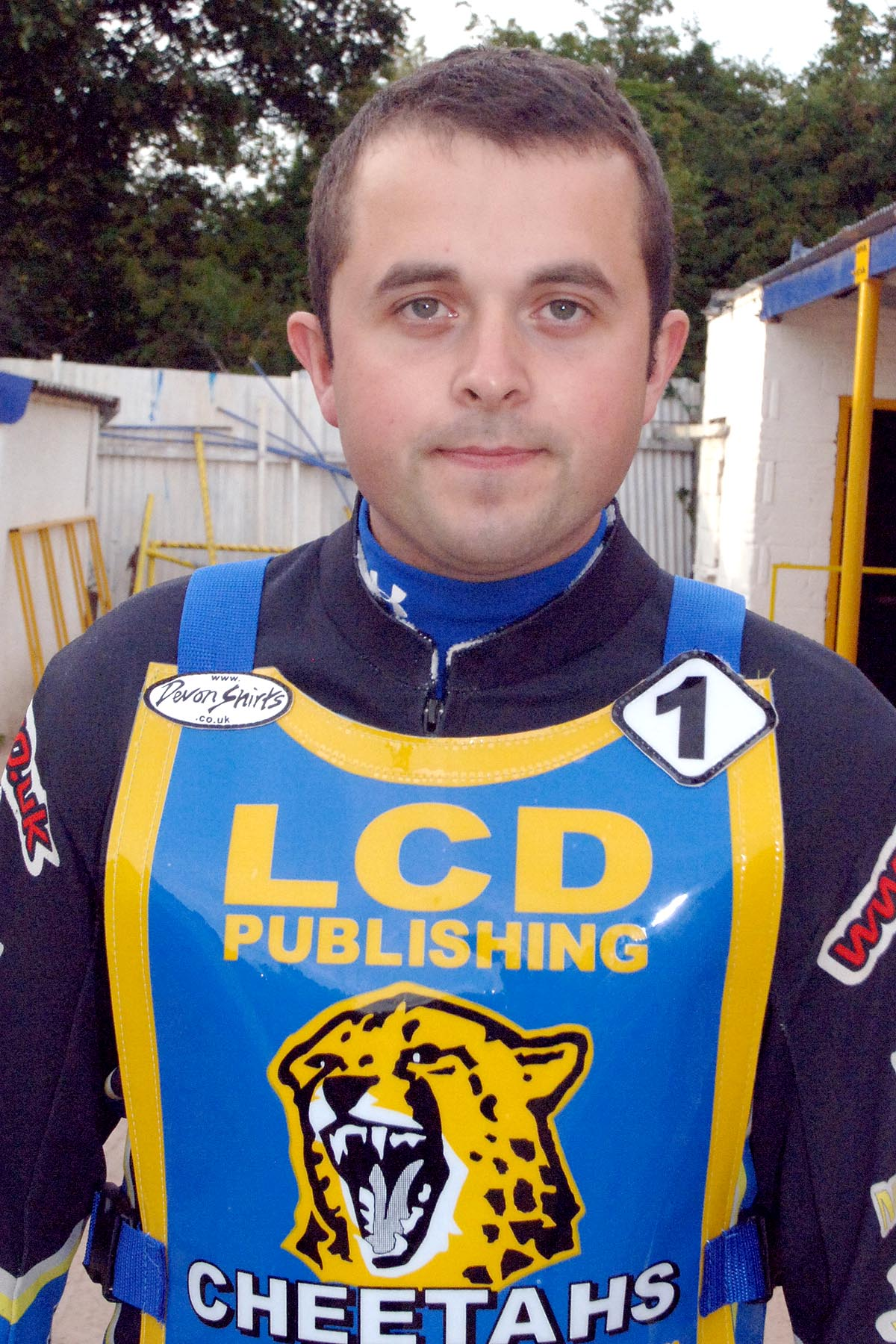
- Born: 30 March 1982 (age 44); Bolton, England
- Nationality: British (English)

Career history
- 1998: Mildenhall
- 1999–2000, 2009: Buxton
- 1999–2001: Workington
- 1999, 2004: Newcastle
- 1999, 2006: Rye House
- 2002: Hull
- 2003, 2005: Exeter
- 2004, 2006: Berwick
- 2006: Wolves
- 2007: Glasgow
- 2007: Oxford
- 2008: Sheffield
- 2009: Weymouth
- 2010: Plymouth
- 2010: Isle of Wight

Lee Kenneth Smethills (born 30 March 1982 in Bolton, Greater Manchester) is a former professional motorcycle speedway rider from England.

== Career ==
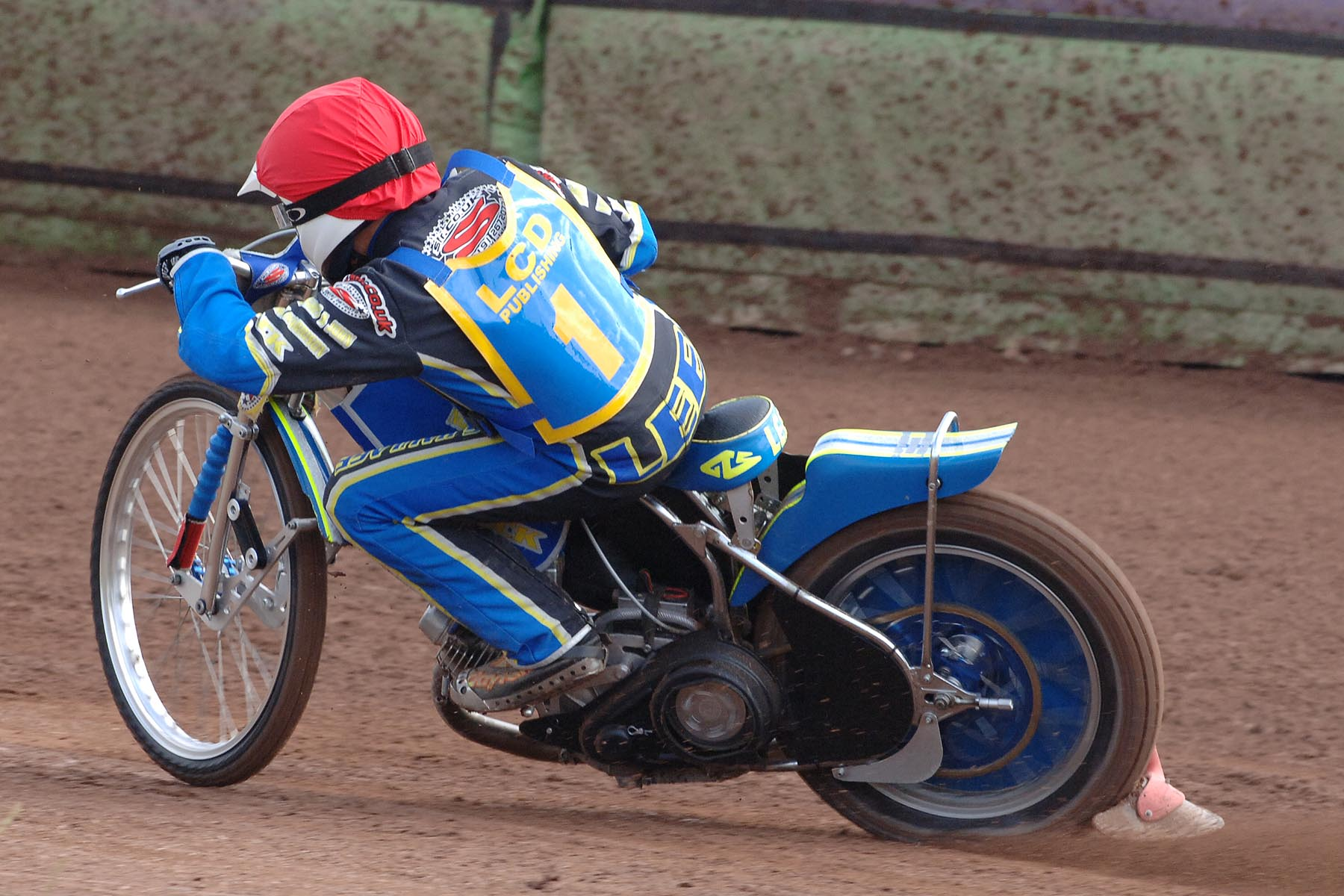
Smethills riding for Oxford in 2007

Smethills rode for various clubs across all of the three divisions of British Speedway from 1998 until 2009.

In 1999 as a 16-year-old, Smethills signed a full contract for Belle Vue Colts, the junior team to the Belle Vue Aces. At the end of the year in December, Smethills an apprentice mechanic, joined Premier League Club Workington Comets on loan after just one season of racing.

Smethills spent seasons at Newcastle Diamonds and Rye House Rockets before making his debut for Hull Vikings during the 2002 Premier League speedway season. Smethills became a journeyman rider, never settling at any one club and spells at Exeter Falcons, Berwick Bandits, Wolverhampton Wolves, Glasgow Tigers and Oxford Cheetahs ensued, in addition to returning to both Newcastle and Workington.

Smethills' final full season was the 2008 Premier League speedway season, where he rode for the Sheffield Tigers although he did ride a handful of matches during the 2009 National League speedway season for Buxton Hitmen and Weymouth Wildcats respectively and in 2010 for Plymouth Devils and the Isle of Wight Islanders.
