= Weymouth Wildcats =

Former English motorcycle speedway team

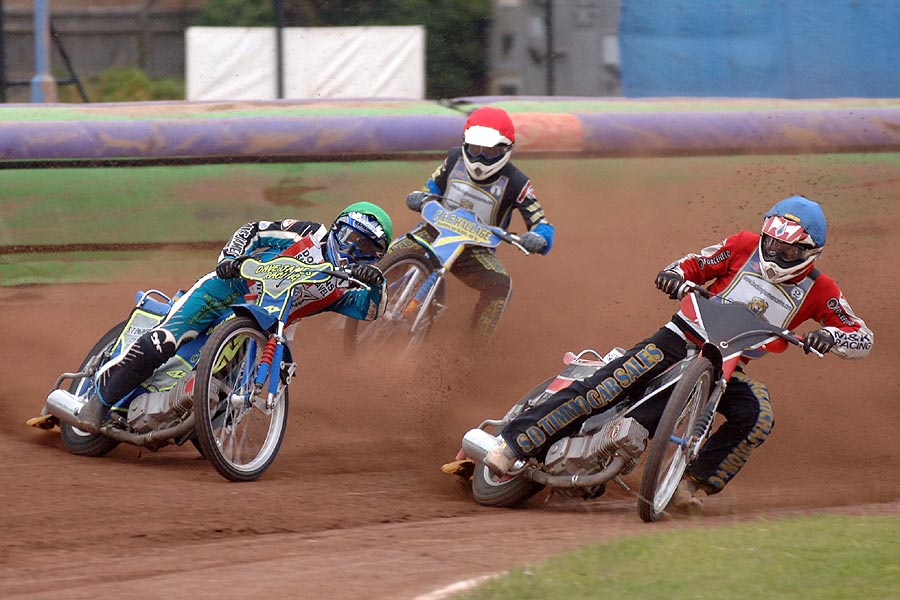
- Weymouth against Oxford in 2007

Club information
- Track address: Wessex Stadium; Radipole Lane; Weymouth, Dorset (now defunct)
- Founded: 1954
- League: Midland & Southern Development League

Club facts
- Colours: Red and white
- Track size: 223 metres
- Track record time: 50.9 seconds
- Track record date: 8 August 2009
- Track record holder: Tim Webster British League Division Two Pairs Championship

Major team honours
National League Pairs Champions	1982, 1983
Conference League Champions	2008
Conference League KO Cup	2005
Conference League Fours	2005, 2008

The Weymouth Wildcats were a British motorcycle speedway team based in Weymouth, Dorset, England, who raced in the National League. The Wildcats won the first Conference League Championship in their history in 2008 after winning the Conference League play-offs. They closed down in 2010. In 2019, they raced at Wimborne Road, the home of Poole Pirates in the Midland Southern Development League, hoping to relocate to Weymouth later.

== History ==
Speedway at the Wessex Stadium started in 1954 under the promotion of J. W. Coates, R. Barzilay, and W. J. (Bill) Dutton. In 1955, Weymouth entered National League Division 2. Early names for the club were Weymouth Scorchers and Weymouth Royals. When the British League formed a second division in 1968, Wally Mawdsley and Pete Lansdale entered a team from Weymouth which was known as Weymouth Eagles. The Eagles finished ninth out of 10 in the 1968 Division 2.

Harry Davis, in 1974, teamed up with Boston promoters Cyril Crane, Gordon Parkins, and Ted Holding to enter the (renamed) Weymouth Wizards in British League Division 2.

In 1975, the Wizards finished in last place out of 20 teams in the League (renamed from British League Division 2 in 1974 to National League).

The year 1978 saw yet another new name, Weymouth Wildcats and new colours (red and white replacing the purple and white), Len Silver (Hackney) taking over as promoter. But Len Silver withdrew from the promotion of Weymouth Speedway during the winter of 1978/79, following a disagreement over terms for using the stadium, and Allied Presentations (the promotion at Reading) stepped in to take over the licence.

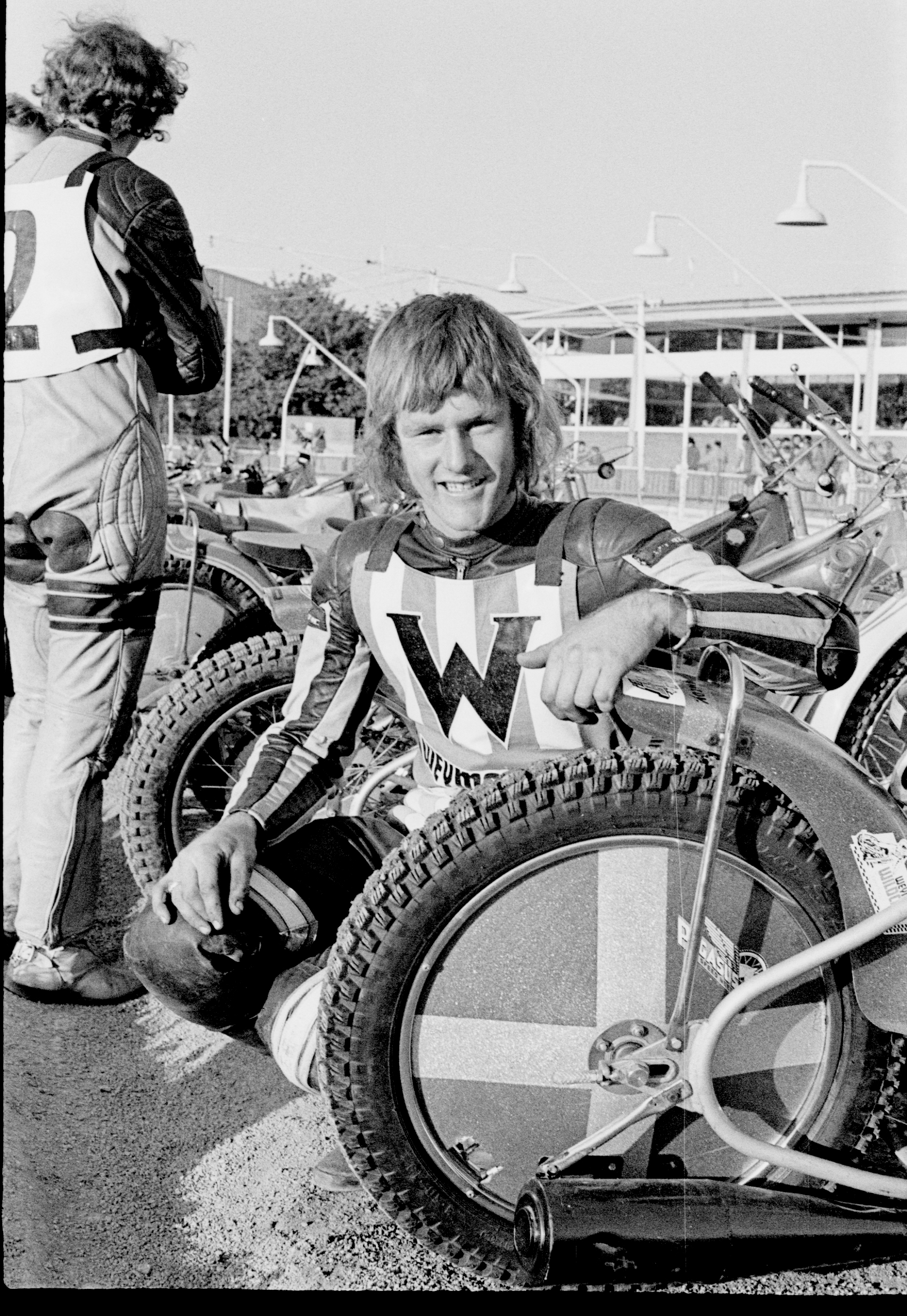
Australian Danny Kennedy topped the Weymouth averages in 1978

Early in 1980, Allied Presentations announced that they would no longer promote Speedway in Weymouth, leading to local businessman Mervyn Stewkesbury becoming the new promoter. In 1981, the Wildcats finished as runners-up in the League. In 1983, Weymouth retained the National League Pairs Championship.

In 2003, after a break of nearly twenty years, former rider and childhood fan Brian White fulfilled a personal dream of bringing speedway racing back to Weymouth. This time, the Wildcats returned to a new venue, the Wessex Stadium. In speedway terms, White called it "the greatest week of his life". Bringing the sport back to the area was no easy task for White, who overcame large opposition and many obstacles. Planning permission was initially turned down in the hamlet of Buckland Ripers, and whilst the proposal seemed to have the local council's backing, a 400-name petition against the establishing of a speedway team there soon stopped the plan in its tracks. Whilst many would simply have given up at this setback, White persevered and was eventually persuaded to restart talks with Weymouth F.C. about the possibility of racing at the Wessex Stadium. After long negotiations and two and a half years of hard work, White's dream was finally realised when West Dorset District Council gave the needed approval for the Wildcats' return on Thursday, 3 July 2003. White pencilled in the official return of speedway in Weymouth for Saturday, 2 August 2003, where riders competed in the Wessex Rosebowl in front of 2500 fans. The winner of the meeting was rider Justin Elkins. White and everybody who helped him were lauded and given widespread praise. Former Wildcats' captain Martin Yeates was quoted as saying, "what Brian White has done here is amazing. He's given the town back their beloved sport and this time I just hope it's here to stay". Former Australian national team boss Neil Street also added, "I kept having to pinch myself to make sure I was watching speedway in Weymouth again. It's been a long wait for the return of the sport and what a way to bring it back".

In November 2010, the club was shut down after its landlords, Morgan Sindall and Wessex Delivery, repossessed the track for non-payment of rent. Despite attempts by local businessman, Harold Doonan, to re-open the club, the landlords subsequently dismantled and removed the track and applied to West Dorset District Council for permission to use the land for open storage.

In 2017, they were entered into the newly formed SDL league with James Tresadern and Martin Peters as co-promoters and co-owners. After a successful season racing out of Plymouth Speedway in 2017, they moved to Eastbourne for 2018. In 2019, they moved to the home of the Poole Pirates. For the 2019 season, Adrian Young and Malcolm Brown were promoted to Commercial Managers to run the business side of the team. As of 2021, they were not entered in a league.

== Season summary ==
Extended content

Year and league	Position	Notes
1955 Speedway National League Division Two	N/A	Scorchers (withdrew, results expunged)
1968 British League Division Two season	9th	Eagles
1974 British League Division Two season	19th	Wizards
1975 New National League season	20th	Wizards
1976 National League season	15th	Wizards
1977 National League season	17th	Wizards
1978 National League season	13th	
1979 National League season	18th	
1980 National League season	17th	
1981 National League season	2nd	
1982 National League season	5th	
1983 National League season	4th	
1984 National League season	13th	
2004 Speedway Conference League	8th	
2005 Speedway Conference League	3rd	Knockout Cup winners
2007 Speedway Conference League	5th	
2008 Speedway Conference League	4th	Champions (play off winners)
2009 National League speedway season	2nd	
2010 National League speedway season	10th	
2017 Southern Development League	5th	
2018 Southern Development League	5th	
2019 Midland Southern Development League	7th	

== Riders previous seasons ==
Extended content

2019 team Midland Southern Development League

- James Laker (Captain)
- James Jessop (Vice-Captain)
- Andrew Palmer
- Jacob Clouting
- Jordan Bull
- Francesca Kirtley-Paine
- Sam Peters

2018 team

Southern Development League

- Jordan Bull (Captain)
- James Jessop
- Bailey Fellows (Vice-Captain)
- Jake Fellows
- Connor Fletcher
- Luke Barnes

2017 team

Southern Development League

- Kenny Bowdrey (captain)
- Mick Sutton (vice-captain)
- Tom Meakins
- Chris Bambury
- James Chattin
- James Jessop

2010 team

- Tom Brown
- Byron Bekker
- Adam McKinna
- James Cockle
- Luke Chessell
- Richard Andrews
- Karl Mason
- Nick Alford

2009 Team

- Jon Armstrong
- Terry Day
- James Cockle
- Matt Wright
- Lee Smart
- Tim Webster
- James White-Williams
- Benji Compton
- Lee Smethills

2008 Team

- Jon Armstrong
- Brendan Johnson
- Luke Priest
- Andrew Bargh
- Jay Herne
- Kyle Newman
- Tim Webster
- Lee Herne

2007 Team

- Lee Smart
- Karl Mason
- Dan Giffard
- Nathan Irwin
- Jay Herne
- Sam Hurst
- Terry Day
- Mark Thompson
- David Mason

2006 Team

- David Mason
- Adam Filmer
- Jordan Frampton
- Danny Warwick
- Chris Johnson
- Mark Jones
- Terry Day

1975 Team Wizards

- Brian Woodward
- Chris Robins
- Vic Harding
- Nigel Couzens
- Martin Yeates
- Roger Stratton

1976 Team Wizards

- Martin Yeates
- Chris Robins
- Roger Stratton
- Vic Harding
- Garry May
- Trevor Charley
