= Stoke Spitfires =

British motorcycle speedway team

Club information
- Track address: Loomer Road Stadium; Newcastle-under-Lyme; Staffordshire
- Country: England
- Founded: 2004
- Website: Stoke Potters

Club facts
- Colours: Red and White
- Track size: 312 meters

Major team honours
Conference League Fours Champions	2006

The Stoke Spitfires were a British speedway team competing in the Conference League. The Spitfires were the junior team of the Stoke Potters. The Spifires won the Conference League Four-Team Championship in 2006.
