= Loomer Road Stadium =

Former sports stadium in England, United Kingdom

Coordinates: 53°1′50″N 2°15′26″W

- Location: Chesterton, Staffordshire

Construction
- Opened: 8 April 1973
- Closed: 15 September 2019
- Demolished: June 2020

Loomer Road Stadium was a sports stadium situated in Chesterton, Staffordshire from c.1970 to 2019. The building had considerable parking facilities, covered terracing and a bar with a view of the track. The stadium opened in 1973 and hosted greyhound racing until 2003, and speedway and stock cars until its closure at the end of the 2019 season.

== Origins ==
Since 1912 the land south of Chesterton and north of Newcastle-under-Lyme has been dominated by the imposing Holditch colliery. The colliery was responsible for mining coal and ironstone creating a tangled web of railway lines, pits and an unused 18th century canal.

In late 1971, Midlands' businessman Russell Bragg applied for and received planning permission from the Newcastle Borough Council for the construction of a new stadium in Chesterton at a cost of £200,000. Architects Foreshaw Greaves designed a 10,000 capacity venue on 12.5 acre farmland plot. Construction began and progressed during 1972 and a speedway licence was eventually granted following initial problems. The first meeting held at the stadium was a BRISCA stock car race meeting on 8 April 1973. The first speedway match at the track took place on 11 April 1973 in front of 6,500 supporters.

A greyhound track soon followed in 1975, giving the area the first speedway and greyhound racing since the closures of Hanley Greyhound Stadium and Cobridge Stadium. The colliery was experiencing heavy investment at the same time which also incentivised the construction.

== Greyhound racing ==
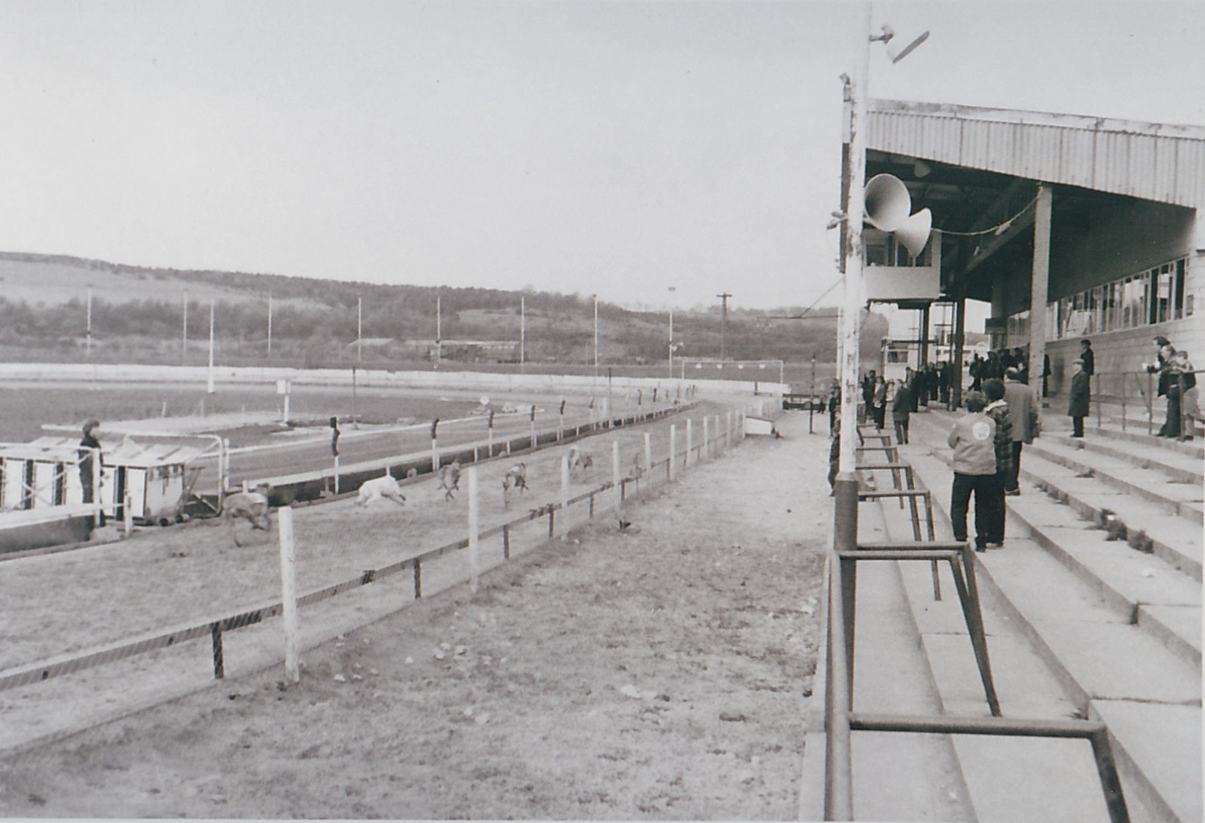
Greyhounds racing on the greyhound track c.1970

Russell Bragg entered into an agreement with John Bryant to start greyhound racing and the first meeting took place on 11 April 1975. There were forty racing kennels on site and the track was known as Chesterton Greyhound Stadium. The track had a small circumference and consisted of 400 and 525 yards before it was switched in February 1979 to the more traditional practice of being located on the outside of the speedway circuit. Unusually for a greyhound track it had been on the inside of the speedway which clearly limited the type of greyhound that could manoeuvre around the tight bends. The switch included a new 'Outside Sumner' hare system. The new distances were initially measured at 259, 455 and 658 metres with the total cost of the alterations being £15,000.

Directors Bill Corbett and Jack Eisenberg successfully applied to join the National Greyhound Racing Club permit scheme in the summer of 1981 but just one year later the experiment had failed and Chesterton reverted to independent status (unaffiliated to a governing body) on 30 November 1982. Stephen Pardoe the Racing Manager stated that "the reasons were purely economic". The costs of registrations and transfers were turning owners away and with the re-opening of the rival Cobridge track they were left with no choice but to leave the permit scheme.

During the late 1980s and the 1990s the racing schedule continued on Wednesday and Friday nights at 7.30pm with trials on Thursday and Sunday. Race distances of 272, 425, 469, 673 and 815 metres formed the basis of meetings around a 360-metre circumference course. Events included the Tardelli Handicap and Potters Classic which was overseen by Newcastle-under-Lyme Stadium Ltd. One of the prominent track trainers was Jimmy Gibson.

Track manager Dave Tattum ended the greyhound racing in 2003.

== Speedway ==
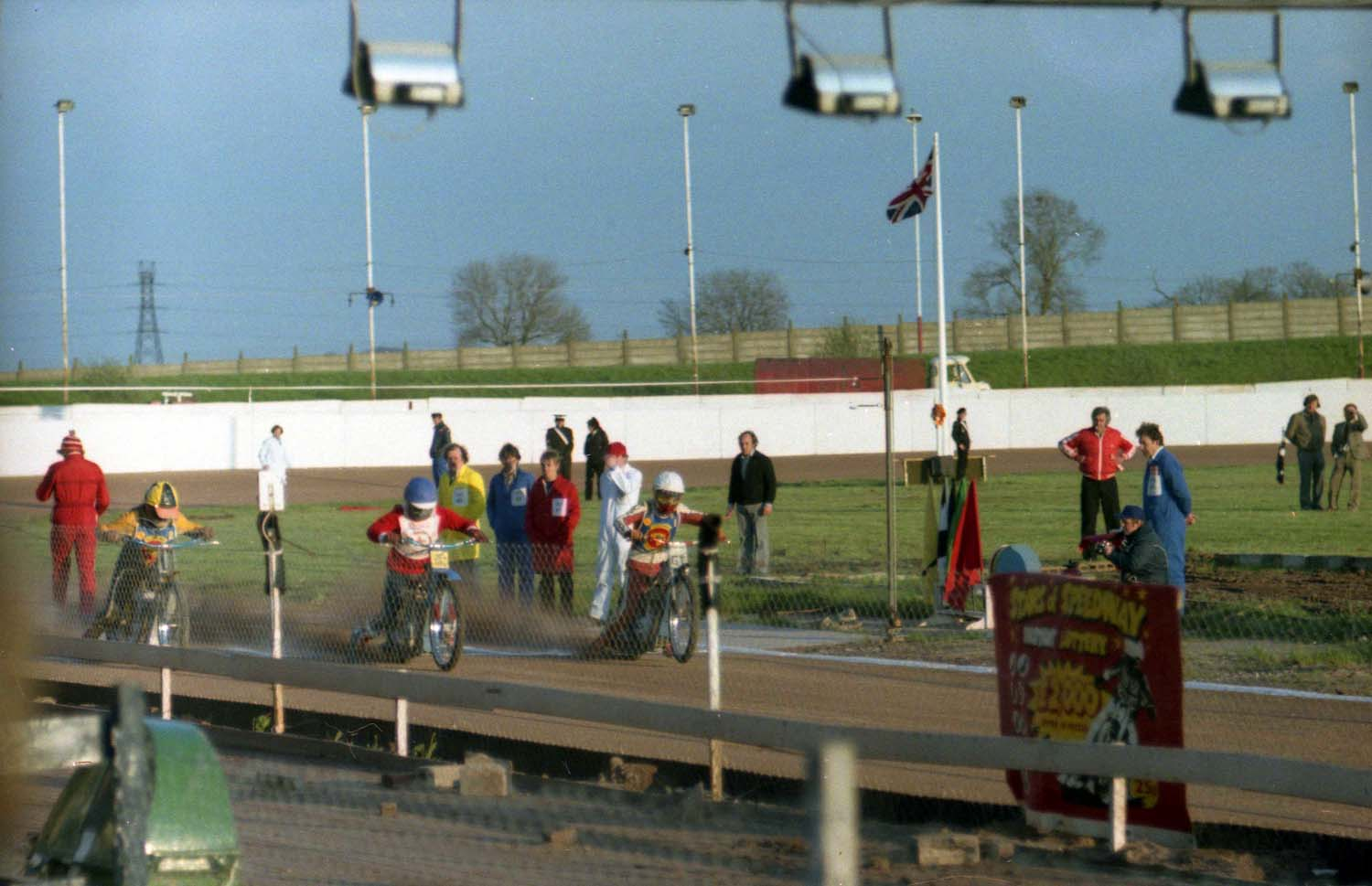
1981 speedway match

In 1973, Chesterton Potters speedway was founded by stadium owner Russell Bragg, and they rode the first season before changing their name to the Stoke Potters.

In the latter period of the stadium's operation, it hosted mainly motorcycle speedway, and it was the home stadium of two speedway teams: the Stoke Potters and the Stoke Spitfires, who raced on Saturdays and Wednesdays respectively.

During the 2017 season, the stadium also hosted the home race nights for the Carmarthen Dragons while they continued working towards their own venue and a return of league speedway in Wales. It held the Stoke Potters' last race on 14 September 2019, as the stadium was sold off to an industrial estate developer.

== Other events ==
It also hosted occasional BriSCA Formula 1 Stock Cars and BriSCA Formula 2 Stock Cars meetings and various events such as firework displays and occasional shows.

== Demolition ==
The stadium was demolished to make way for a Boughey Distribution Ltd warehouse during June 2020.
