= Eddie Wright Raceway =

Race track in Scunthorpe, England

Coordinates: 53.6165°N 0.6548°W

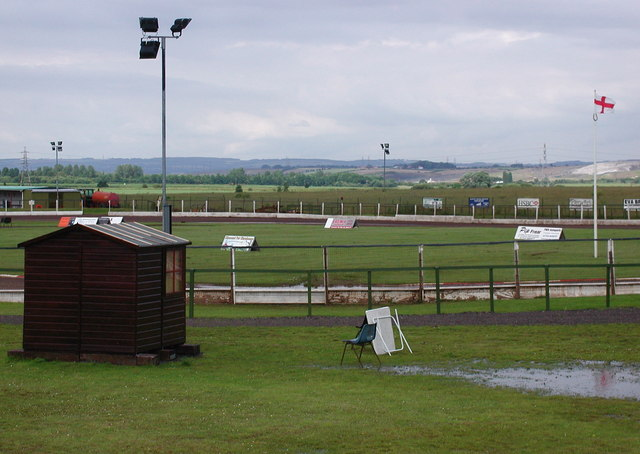
The track in 2007

The Eddie Wright Raceway is a British race track in Scunthorpe, North Lincolnshire. It is primarily used for motorcycle speedway, but also occasionally hosts stock car racing.

== History ==
In 2004, the North Lincolnshire Council offered a 10-acre plot of land on Normanby Road to the Scunthorpe speedway team and work began on creating a new venue. Promoters Rob Godfrey and Norman Beeney opened the track for practice in 2004 before the first speedway meeting was held on 27 March 2005, ending a twenty-year absence of speedway in Scunthorpe. The Scorpions took their place in division 3 (the 2005 Speedway Conference League).

In 2008, used car dealership Eddie Wright entered into a 29-year sponsorship deal with Scunthorpe Scorpions to rename the track the Eddie Wright Raceway.

== Usage ==
=== Bangers & Stockcars ===
The Eddie Wright Raceway also host's banger and stockcar events every 3–4 weeks from March - November.

== Statistics ==
- Length: 285 metres
- Width: 18 metres (bends), 15 metres (straights)
- Record Lap Time (Speedway): 55.92 seconds by David Howe on 24 April 2009
