= Plymouth Coliseum =

Sports venue in Plymouth, Devon, England

- Interactive map of Plymouth Coliseum
- Former names: St Boniface's Playing Fields
- Location: Coypool Road, Plymouth, England
- Coordinates: 50°23′27″N 4°4′59″W
- Owner: St Boniface's Catholic College
- Operator: Plymouth Devils
- Capacity: 2000
- Surface: Grass/Speedway Track

Construction
- Groundbreaking: 1982
- Built: 1982
- Opened: 1982
- Renovated: 2006

Tenants
- St Boniface's Catholic College (1982-present); Plymouth Gladiators (2006–present)

Plymouth Coliseum, formerly known as St Boniface Arena, is a rugby field and speedway venue in Plymouth, Devon. It is situated adjacent to the River Plym near Marsh Mills.

== Stadium ==
The stadium dates back to 1982 and has hosted speedway since 2006. The stadium has recently been upgraded by the owner, speedway promoter Mike Bowden.

== Speedway ==
The stadium is the home of the Plymouth Gladiators who currently compete in the Championship.

Speedway track maintenance vehicles owned by the Gladiators were vandalized in an arson attack on 13 July 2022, following a series of attacks in which club vehicles were damaged. Police opened a criminal investigation, but club owner Mark Phillips expressed disappointment at the lack of consequences for vandals and trespassers at the Coliseum.

== School Playing Fields ==
St Boniface's Catholic College use half of their ground as a school playing field. The field is also used by Plympton Victoria Rugby Club.

== See also ==
- St Boniface's Catholic College
- Plymouth Devils
