= National League Knockout Cup =

British motorcycle speedway competition

- Sport: motorcycle speedway
- Founded: 1995
- Divisions: (Div 1) Premiership KO Cup (Div 2) Championship KO Cup
- Country: United Kingdom

The National League Knockout Cup is a motorcycle speedway third tier Knockout Cup competition in the United Kingdom.

The competition was previously known as the Academy League Knockout Cup (1995) and the Conference League Knockout Cup (1996-2008) until it changed name to the National League Knockout Cup.

The 2020 and 2021 editions of the Cup were cancelled due to the COVID-19 pandemic.

== Winners ==
Year	Winners	Runners-up
Academy League Knockout Cup
1995	Berwick Bandits	Stoke Potters
Conference League Knockout Cup
1996	Linlithgow Lightning	Mildenhall Fen Tigers
1998	St Austell Gulls	Mildenhall Fen Tigers
1999	St Austell Gulls	Newport Mavericks
2000	Boston Barracudas	Rye House Rockets
2001	Somerset Rebels	Rye House Rockets
2002	Buxton Hitmen	Rye House Raiders
2003	Mildenhall Fen Tigers	Rye House Raiders
2004	Mildenhall Fen Tigers	Boston Barracuda-Braves
2005	Weymouth Wildcats	Mildenhall Fen Tigers
2006	Scunthorpe Scorpions	Plymouth Devils
2007	Scunthorpe Scorpions	Plymouth Devils
2008	Plymouth Devils	Boston Barracuda-Braves
National League Knockout Cup
2009	Bournemouth Buccaneers	Buxton Hitmen
2010	Buxton Hitmen	King's Lynn Young Stars
2011	Mildenhall Fen Tigers	Stoke Potters
2012	Mildenhall Fen Tigers	Dudley Heathens
2013	Dudley Heathens	Isle of Wight Islanders
2014	Cradley Heathens	King's Lynn Young Stars
2015	Eastbourne Eagles	Cradley Heathens
2016	Eastbourne Eagles	Birmingham Brummies
2017	Eastbourne Eagles	Mildenhall Fen Tigers
2018	Eastbourne Eagles	Mildenhall Fen Tigers
National Development League Knockout Cup
2019	Leicester Lion Cubs	Belle Vue Colts
2020	cancelled due to COVID-19	
2021	not held	
2022	Leicester Lion Cubs	Mildenhall Fen Tigers
2023	Mildenhall Fen Tigers	Leicester Lion Cubs

== See also ==
- Knockout Cup (speedway) for full list of winners and competitions
