= 2000 Speedway Conference League =

British motorcycle speedway season

- League: Conference League
- Champions: Sheffield Prowlers
- Knockout Cup: Boston Barracudas
- Conference Cup: Mildenhall Fen Tigers
- Individual: Scott Pegler
- Division/s above: 2000 Elite League; 2000 Premier League

The 2000 Speedway Conference League was the third tier/division of British speedway.

== Summary ==
A new team called Somerset Rebels entered British speedway for the first time, racing at the Oaktree Arena.

The title was won by Sheffield Prowlers, the junior club belonging to the Sheffield Tigers. Mildenhall Fen Tigers were denied the chance to win the title following their final fixture against St. Austell being unable to be fulfilled, it had been postponed four times because of the weather.

== League ==
=== Final table ===
Pos	Team	Played	W	D	L	F	A	Pts	Bonus	Total
1	Sheffield Prowlers	18	12	1	5	850	750	25	6	31
2	Mildenhall Fen Tigers	17	12	1	4	796	728	25	6	31
3	Somerset Rebels	18	10	0	8	868	744	20	7	27
4	Boston Barracudas	17	10	1	6	821	703	21	6	27
5	Newport Mavericks	18	9	1	8	818	791	19	4	23
6	Rye House Rockets	18	8	0	10	837	768	16	6	22
7	St Austell Gulls	16	8	0	8	711	721	16	4	20
8	Buxton Hitmen	18	7	2	9	752	859	16	2	18
9	Ashfield Giants	18	5	0	13	734	871	10	4	14
10	Peterborough Pumas	18	4	0	14	679	931	8	0	8

=== Fixtures and results ===
Home \ Away	ASH	BOS	BUX	MIL	NEW	PET	RYE	SA	SHE	SOM
Ashfield Giants		35–55	64–26	44–45	38–51	50–36	48–42	55–35	58–32	38–52
Boston Barracudas	60–29		58–32	57–33	53–36	60–30	52–38	n/a	45–45	60–29
Buxton Hitmen	63–26	43–47		45–45	45–45	47–41	48–42	60–30	46–44	44–43
Mildenhall Fen Tigers	57–33	51–39	49–41		59–31	54–36	51–38	n/a	51–39	45–44
Newport Mavericks	59–30	46–44	64–25	41–48		61–28	61–29	50–40	41–49	53–37
Peterborough Pumas	46–44	43–47	40–49	33–56	43–46		46–44	46–44	47–43	41–49
Rye House Rockets	53–37	46–44	63–27	55–34	50–40	64–26		57–32	58–32	44–46
St Austell Gulls	52–36	46–44	51–38	35–55	55–33	63–27	53–37		38–52	49–39
Sheffield Prowlers	47–40	58–29	50–40	50–40	63–25	56–34	40–38	48–42		53–37
Somerset Rebels	60–29	63–27	57–33	67–23	55–35	54–36	51–39	44–46	41–49	

Legend: Blue = home team win; Yellow = draw; Red = away team win.

== Conference League Knockout Cup ==
The 2000 Conference League Knockout Cup was the third edition of the Knockout Cup for tier three teams. Boston Barracudas were the winners.

First round

Team one	Team two	Score
Somerset	Rye House	42.5–47.5, 32–58
Boston	Buxton	70–19, 45–44

Semi-finals

Team one	Team two	Score
Mildenhall	Rye House	48–42, 35–55
St Austell	Boston	57–33, 25–65

=== Final ===
First leg

21 October 2000

Boston Peter Boast 12 Carl Wilkinson 10 Luke Clifton 8 Ricky Scarboro 7 Rob Hollingworth 6 David Chadburn 6 Freddie Stephenson 4	53 – 37	Rye House David Mason 12 Simon Wolstenholme 11 Daniel Giffard 8 Nathan Morton 4 Simon Moon 1 Gary Sweet 1 Phil Ambrose R/R

King's Lynn Stadium

Second leg

23 October 2000

Rye House David Mason 16 Gary Sweet 13 Simon Moon 8 Nathan Morton 6 Simon Wolstenholme 5 Daniel Giffard 2 Phil Ambrose R/R	50 – 38	Boston Luke Clifton 11 Carl Wilkinson 9 Ricky Scarboro 7 Rob Hollingworth 4 Peter Boast 3 Freddie Stephenson 3 David Chadburn 1

Rye House Stadium

Boston were declared Knockout Cup champions, winning on aggregate 91–87.

== League Cup ==
Group A

Pos	Team	M	W	D	L	Pts
1	St. Austell	4	3	0	1	6
2	Somerset	4	2	1	1	5
3	Buxton	4	0	1	3	1

Group B

Pos	Team	M	W	D	L	Pts
1	Mildenhall	4	3	0	1	6
2	Rye House	4	2	0	2	4
3	Boston	4	1	0	3	2

Group A

Home \ Away	BUX	STA	SOM
Buxton		43–47	45–45
St.Austell	50–39		48–40
Somerset	51–39	55–35	

Legend: Blue = home team win; Yellow = draw; Red = away team win.

Group B

Home \ Away	BOS	MIL	RYE
Boston		30–59	59–31
Mildenhall	54–36		53–37
Rye House	52–38	47–41	

Legend: Blue = home team win; Yellow = draw; Red = away team win.

Final

Team one	Team two	Score
Somerset	Mildenhall	46–43, 24–54

== Riders' Championship ==
Scott Pegler won the Riders' Championship. The final was held on 9 September at Hayley Stadium.

Pos.	Rider	Team	Total
1	Scott Pegler	Newport	13
2	Steve Bishop	Somerset	13
3	Adam Allott	Sheffield	11
4	Gary Phelps	St. Austell	9
5	Shane Colvin	Mildenhall	9
6	Wayne Barrett	St. Austell	9
7	Carl Wilkinson	Boston	8
8	Rob Grant II	Ashfield	8
9	David Mason	Rye House	8
10	Chris Courage	Newport	8
11	Andrew Moore	Sheffield	8
12	Ian Barney	Peterborough	7
13	Barrie Evans	Mildenhall	3
14	Paul Burnett	Buxton	3
15	Rob Hollingworth	Boston	2
16	Chris Schramm	Peterborough	1
17	Graig Gough (res)	Newport	0

== See also ==
List of United Kingdom Speedway League Champions
