= National League Riders' Championship =

British motorcycle speedway competition

- Sport: Speedway
- Founded: 1994
- Country: United Kingdom
- Most recent champion: Connor Bailey
- Most titles: Ben Morley 2

Notes
- division above Championship Riders' Championship

The National League Riders' Championship is an annual motorcycle speedway contest between the top riders (or two riders) with the highest average points total from each club competing in the third tier league in the United Kingdom.

The same format of Championship applies for the tier one and tier two leagues, that of the SGB Premiership Riders' Individual Championship (tier one) and the SGB Championship Riders' Individual Championship (tier two).

== Winners ==
Year	Winner	Team	Ref
From 1994 it was known as the British League Division Three Individual Championship
1994	Andy Howe	Cleveland Bays	
From 1995 it was known as the Academy League Riders' Individual Championship
1995	Kevin Little	Berwick Bandits	
From 1996 it was known as the Conference League Riders' Individual Championship
1996	Mike Hampson	Buxton Hitmen	
1997	Jon Armstrong	Buxton Hitmen	
1998	Steve Bishop	St Austell Gulls	
1999	Jonathan Swales	Linlithgow Lightning	
2000	Scott Pegler	Newport Wasps	
2001	David Mason	Rye House Rockets	
2002	James Birkinshaw	Rye House Rockets	
2003	Barrie Evans	Rye House Raiders	
2004	James Wright	Buxton Hitmen	
2005	Steve Boxall	Rye House Raiders	
2006	Adam Roynon	Buxton Hitmen	
2007	Tai Woffinden	Scunthorpe Scorpions	
2008	Benji Compton	Redcar Cubs	
From 2009 it was known as the National League Riders' Individual Championship
2009	Craig Cook	Buxton Hitmen	
2010	Lee Smart	Dudley	
2011	Jason Garrity	Belle Vue Colts	
2012	Ashley Birks	Stoke Potters	
2013	Steve Boxall	Kent Kings	
2014	Danny Halsey	Mildenhall Fen Tigers	
2015	Ben Morley	Kent Kings	
2016	Max Clegg	Cradley	
2017	Dan Bewley	Belle Vue Colts	
2018	Ben Morley	Isle of Wight Islanders	
2019	Anders Rowe	Kent Kings	
The 2020 & 2021 editions were cancelled due to COVID-19
2022	Jordan Jenkins	Oxford Chargers	
2023	Connor Bailey	Workington Comets	
2024	Sam Hagon	Belle Vue Colts	
2025	Vinnie Foord	Scunthorpe/Sheffield Steekers	

== See also ==
- List of United Kingdom Speedway League Riders' champions
- Speedway in the United Kingdom
