= 2005 Speedway Conference League =

British motorcycle speedway season

- League: Conference League
- Champions: Oxford Silver Machine Academy
- Knockout Cup: Weymouth Wildcats
- Conference Trophy: Armadale Dale Devils
- Individual: Steve Boxall
- Pairs: Wimbledon Dons
- Fours: Weymouth Wildcats
- Division/s above: 2005 Elite League; 2005 Premier League

The 2005 Speedway Conference League was the third tier/division of British speedway.

== Summary ==
The title was won by Oxford Silver Machine Academy, junior club of the Oxford Cheetahs.

== League ==
=== Final table ===
Pos	Team	Played	W	D	L	F	A	Pts
1	Oxford Silver Machine Academy	22	15	3	4	1091	909	42
2	Wimbledon Dons	22	15	0	7	1106	932	41
3	Weymouth Wildcats	22	13	0	9	1075	956	33
4	Mildenhall Fen Tigers	22	12	1	9	1067	968	33
5	Armadale Dale Devils	22	12	0	10	1025	986	31
6	Rye House Raiders	22	12	0	10	1046	987	29
7	Stoke Spitfires	22	12	0	10	1031	982	29
8	Scunthorpe Scorpions	22	11	0	11	1012	1000	27
9	Boston Barracuda-Braves	22	11	0	11	982	1055	26
10	Newport Mavericks	22	9	0	13	968	1051	21
11	Buxton Hitmen	22	6	1	15	890	1112	14
12	Sittingbourne Crusaders	22	1	1	20	823	1178	4

=== Fixtures and results ===
Home \ Away	ARM	BOS	BUX	MIL	NEW	OX	RYE	SCU	SIT	STO	WEY	WIM
Armadale Dale Devils		52–41	54–41	58–37	61–34	41–53	46–43	58–38	47–45	54–39	50–39	57–36
Boston Barracuda Braves	45–44		57–35	44–49	52–38	45–53	40–49	48–42	62–31	56–39	48–45	55–42
Buxton Hitmen	44–45	44–46		39–51	48–41	45–45	47–43	54–38	56–36	47–43	40–49	38–53
Mildenhall Fen Tigers	51–44	57–39	59–36		54–37	46–46	51–39	57–37	63–30	54–42	56–39	42–48
Newport Mavericks	45–43	44–48	63–28	48–43		67–26	58–38	42–47	46–47	45–41	52–43	49–46
Oxford Silver Machine Academy	55–18	66–27	63–31	49–38	54–39		58–35	50–30	53–37	53–43	51–45	46–44
Rye House Raiders	51–41	54.5–37.5	64–30	47–42	56–40	44–46		53–42	59–36	60–34	51–45	52–43
Scunthorpe Scorpions	50–44	61–31	60–37	50–43	57–35	44–49	55–38		64–29	41–49	42–48	54–40
Sittingbourne Crusaders	43–47	42–48	39–55	43–47	45–46	45–45	41–49	34–42		42–48	39–55	36–57
Stoke Spitfires	46–44	53–41	46–30	52–41	57–35	50–43	50–40	44–45	63–29		63–32	54–39
Weymouth Wildcats	54–43	60–33	58–33	51–40	53–37	45–44	53–40	54–42	66–20	53–40		44–46
Wimbledon Dons	56–34	55–39	58–32	50–46	64–27	50–43	52–40	63–31	60–34	58–35	46–44	

Legend: Blue = home team win; Yellow = draw; Red = away team win.

== Conference League Knockout Cup ==
The 2005 Conference League Knockout Cup was the eighth edition of the Knockout Cup for tier three teams. Weymouth Wildcats were the winners. First round

Team one	Team two	First Leg	Second Leg5
Oxford	Wimbledon	60–33	44–46
Boston	Scunthorpe	53–41	49–40

Quarter-finals

Team one	Team two	First Leg	Second Leg
Buxton	Weymouth	51–43	40–55
Mildenhall	Oxford	54–40	42–53
Newport	Rye House	56–38	40–50
Stoke	Boston	59–35	39–54

Semi-finals

Team one	Team two	First Leg	Second Leg
Weymouth	Newport	51–43	50–41
Boston	Mildenhall	41–51	33–60

Final

14 October	Weymouth Wildcats; Lewis Bridger 13; Dan Giffard 13; David Mason 11; Tom Brown 7 James Clement 5 Shane Waldron 4 Danny Hughes 1	54–40	Mildenhall Fen Tigers; Jon Armstrong 11; Chris Johnson 9 Lee Smart 5 Andrew Bargh 5 James Purchase 3 Mark Thompson 3 Trevor Heath 2	Wessex Stadium

16 October	Mildenhall Fen Tigers; Jon Armstrong 12; Mark Thompson 11; Chris Johnson 9 Andrew Bargh 8 Lee Smart 5 James Purchase 5 Trevor Heath 1	51–45	Weymouth Wildcats; Lewis Bridger 11; Dan Giffard 11; David Mason 11; Tom Brown 6 Shane Waldron 4 James Clement 2 Danny Hughes 0	Mildenhall Stadium

== Conference Trophy ==
North Group

Pos	Team	M	W	D	L	Pts
1	Armadale	6	3	1	2	7
2	Stoke	6	3	0	3	6
3	Buxton	3	0	3	5	6
4	Scunthorpe	6	2	1	3	5

South Group

Pos	Team	M	W	D	L	Pts
1	Weymouth	6	5	0	1	10
2	Boston	6	3	0	3	6
3	Wimbledon	6	2	0	4	4
4	Mildenhall	6	2	0	4	4

Home \ Away	ARM	BUX	SCU	STO
Armadale		64–29	53–42	54–44
Buxton	49–43		46–43	52–42
Scunthorpe	46–46	51–44		55–39
Stoke	50–46	51–39	58–35	

Legend: Blue = home team win; Yellow = draw; Red = away team win.

Home \ Away	BOS	MIL	WEY	WIM
Boston		51–41	42–50	54–40
Mildenhall	42–49		49–43	51–42
Weymouth	48–42	56–37		58–35
Wimbledon	61–31	50–20	42–48	

Legend: Blue = home team win; Yellow = draw; Red = away team win.

Semi-final

Team one	Team two	Score
Weymouth	Stoke	44–46, 41–52
Armadale	Boston	53–43, 48–42

Final

Team one	Team two	Score
Armadale	Stoke	41–40, 50–43

== Riders' Championship ==
Steve Boxall won the Riders' Championship. The final was held on 27 August at Rye House Stadium.

Pos.	Rider	Team	Total
1	Steve Boxall	Rye House	15
2	Barrie Evans	Stoke	11
3	Blair Scott	Armadale	11
4	David Mason	Weymouth	11
5	Lewis Bridger	Weymouth	10
6	Jon Armstrong	Mildenhall	10
7	Wayne Carter	Scunthorpe	9
8	Mark Burrows	Wimbledon	8
9	Adam Roynon	Mildenhall	7
10	Craig Branney	Oxford	7
11	Karlis Ezergailis	Newport	5
12	Jonathon Bethel	Buxton	4
13	Danny Betson	Wimbledon	4
14	Harland Cook	Rye House	3
15	Mark Baseby (res)	Sittingbourne	3
16	Chris Hunt	Sittingbourne	2
17	Simon Lambert	Boston	0
18	Lee Smart (res)	Mildenhall	0

== Pairs ==
The Pairs Championship was held at the Wimbledon Stadium, on 17 July. The event was won by Mark Burrows and Scott James of the Wimbledon.

Group 1
Pos	Team	Pts	Riders
1	Wimbledon	14	Mark Burrows 8, Scott James 6
2	Sittingbourne	7	Gary Phelps 4, Andre Cross 3
3	Newport	6	Karl Mason 6, Billy Legg 0

Group 2
Pos	Team	Pts	Riders
1	Stoke	12	Barrie Evans 8, Jack Hargreaves 4
2	Mildenhall	8	Lee Smart 5, Jon Armstrong 3
3	Wimbledon B	7	Matthew Wright 7, Danny Betson 0

Group 3
Pos	Team	Pts	Riders
1	Scunthorpe	11	Wayne Carter 7, Benji Compton 4
2	Boston	8	Rob Hollingworth 6, Karl White 2
3	Weymouth	8	Dan Giffard 8, Lewis Bridger 0

Group 4
Pos	Team	Pts	Riders
1	Oxford	11	Craig Branney 8, Chris Mills 3
2	Buxton	9	Jonathon Bethell 6, Carl Belfield 3
3	Rye House	7	Barry Burchatt 5, Luke Bowen 2

Final
Pos	Team	Pts	Riders
1	Wimbledon	16	Mark Burrows 11, Scott James 5
2	Oxford	16	Craig Branney 10, Chris Mills 6
3	Stoke	14	Barrie Evans 12, Jack Hargreaves 2
4	Scunthorpe	8	Wayne Carter 5, Benji Compton 3

- Run-Off for the Title: James, Burrows, Mills, Branney

== Fours ==
Weymouth won the Conference League Four-Team Championship, held on 25 June 2005 at Loomer Road Stadium.

Group A
Pos	Team	Pts	Riders
1	Boston	16	Lambert 5, Walker 5, Roynon 3, Irwin 3
2	Armadale	14	Sneddon 5, Scott 4, Tully 4, Stoddart 1
3	Stoke	12	Evans 5, Grant 4, Priest 3, Mitchell 0
4	Wimbledon	5	Betson 2, James 1, Burrows 1, Wright 1

Group B
Pos	Team	Pts	Riders
1	Oxford	14	Branney 5, Mills 3, Barker 3, Courtney 3
2	Weymouth	13	Giffard 5, Bridger 4, Brown 3, Mason 1
3	Scunthorpe	11	Carter 5, Norton 3, Compton 2, Bekker 1
4	Mildenhall	10	Armstrong 5, Collins 4, Bargh 1, Smart 0

Final
Pos	Team	Pts	Riders
1	Weymouth	16	Mason 5, Giffard 5, Bridger 4, Brown 1
2	Oxford	15	Barker 6, Mills 5, Courtney 4, Branney 0
3	Armadale	9	Sneddon 5, Scott 3, Stoddart 1, Tully 0
4	Boston	8	Walker 3, Roynon 3, Irwin 1, Lambert 1

== See also ==
List of United Kingdom Speedway League Champions
