= 2004 Speedway Conference League =

British motorcycle speedway season

- League: Conference League
- Champions: Mildenhall Fen Tigers
- Knockout Cup: Mildenhall Fen Tigers
- Individual: James Wright
- Conference Trophy: Mildenhall Fen Tigers
- Pairs: Wimbledon Dons
- Fours: Mildenhall Fen Tigers
- Division/s above: 2004 Elite League; 2004 Premier League

The 2004 Speedway Conference League was the third-tier division of British speedway.

== Summary ==
Sittingbourne Crusaders returned after a seven-year absence but only competed in the Knockout Cup.

The title was won by Mildenhall Fen Tigers.

== League ==
=== Final table ===
Pos	Team	Played	W	D	L	F	A	Pts	Bonus	Total
1	Mildenhall Fen Tigers	24	21	0	3	1254	952	42	10	52
2	Rye House Raiders	24	19	0	5	1206	991	38	9	47
3	Oxford Silver Machine Academy	24	17	0	7	1199	979	34	10	44
4	Armadale Dale Devils	24	15	0	9	1185	990	30	8	38
5	Boston Barracuda-Braves	24	14	1	9	1171	1034	29	8	37
6	Buxton Hitmen	24	13	1	10	1093	1100	27	7	34
7	Wimbledon Dons	24	11	0	13	1138	1080	22	6	28
8	Weymouth Wildcats	24	10	1	13	1047	1143	21	5	26
9	Stoke Spitfires	24	9	1	14	1054	1139	19	4	23
10	Swindon Sprockets	24	8	0	16	1063	1158	16	5	21
11	Newcastle Gems	24	7	0	17	998	1203	14	2	16
12	Carmarthen Dragons	24	5	1	18	998	1187	11	4	15
13	Newport Mavericks	24	4	1	19	883	1333	9	0	9

=== Fixtures and results ===
Home \ Away	ARM	BOS	BUX	CAR	MIL	NG	NM	OX	RYE	STO	SWI	WEY	WIM
Armadale Dale Devils		48–42	49–44	67–27	45–49	65–25	62–31	44–43	59–31	46–27	59–33	53–21	58–37
Boston Barracuda Braves	55–40		48–42	65–28	52–42	48–31	67–24	33–52	57–36	57–36	43–47	50–44	52–43
Buxton Hitmen	47–45	52–39		46–44	38–56	50–45	55–40	51–45	36–54	47–42	56–38	59–33	48–41
Carmarthen Dragons	44–46	36–57	46–46		42–46	63–27	57–37	29–62	40–54	50–42	43–46	42–48	38–55
Mildenhall Fen Tigers	47–46	45–47	57–35	55–38		54–38	66–26	55–37	53–40	59–36	59–36	60–32	59–36
Newcastle Gems	41–48	47–49	44–46	52–43	40–55		58–38	39–53	42–53	50–43	53–39	45–44	31–41
Newport Mavericks	39–53	26–66	42–48	46–44	29–55	43–53		41–52	41–52	47–46	49–43	45–45	47–43
Oxford Silver Machine Academy	58–37	58–35	51–44	44–31	32–43	61–29	62–34		48–42	46–48	57–34	54–39	45–43
Rye House Raiders	54–39	55–38	42–33	50–42	56–36	62–33	64–31	47–46		51–38	65–26	61–30	52–41
Stoke Spitfires	46–44	45–45	42–48	58–36	45–50	41–51	57–38	48–45	41–49		57–36	50–40	51–42
Swindon Sprockets	44–50	55–40	59–36	42–47	46–47	58–37	65–27	41–52	39–49	43–47		55–39	53–41
Weymouth Wildcats	46–45	55–40	47–42	42–48	35–58	51–44	55–37	45–48	59–34	57–36	48–47		45–47
Wimbledon Dons	59–37	47–46	51–44	54–40	45–48	55–43	65–25	47–48	43–53	62–32	57–38	43–47	

Legend: Blue = home team win; Yellow = draw; Red = away team win.

== Conference League Knockout Cup ==
The 2004 Conference League Knockout Cup was the seventh edition of the Knockout Cup for tier three teams. Mildenhall Fen Tigers were the winners for the second successive year.

First round

Team one	Team two	Score
Weymouth	Stoke	53–41, 47–42
Mildenhall	Carmarthen	52–31, 53–42
Wimbledon	Sittingbourne	55–38, 53–40

Quarter-finals

Team one	Team two	Score
Boston	Rye House	48–42, 51–44
Oxford	Buxton	61–31, 44–50
Weymouth	Wimbledon	47–48, 38–56
Mildenhall	King's Lynn	63–27, n/a

Semi-finals

Team one	Team two	Score
Wimbledon	Boston	38–56, 43–54
Mildenhall	Oxford	51–43, 45–48

=== Final ===
29 October	Boston Barracuda-Braves	46–47	Mildenhall Fen Tigers	Saddlebow Road

31 October	Mildenhall Fen Tigers; Adam Roynon 15	69–12	Boston Barracuda-Braves; Ben Powell 4	Mildenhall Stadium

== Conference Trophy ==
Pos	Team	M	W	D	L	Pts
1	Mildenhall	12	9	0	3	18
2	Sheffield	12	8	0	4	16
3	Weymouth	12	7	1	4	15
4	Wimbledon	12	7	1	4	15
5	Buxton	12	7	0	5	14
6	King's Lynn	12	3	0	9	6
7	Coventry	12	0	0	12	0

Home \ Away	BUX	COV	KL	MIL	SHE	WEY	WIM
Buxton		53–44	49–47	48–45	52–44	53–39	55–49
Coventry	45–48		39–53	39–54	43–47	46–47	40–51
King's Lynn	48–42	50–45		44–48	43–47	43–47	41–55
Mildenhall	52–40	54–41	56–38		56–39	53–42	52–43
Sheffield	50–43	49–40	57–37	47–46		60–34	58–36
Weymouth	52–43	64–29	62–31	43–52	56–39		48–45
Wimbledon	57–38	55–39	53–41	48–45	51–45	42–42	

Legend: Blue = home team win; Yellow = draw; Red = away team win.

== Riders' Championship ==
James Wright won the Riders' Championship. The final was held on 28 August at Rye House Stadium.

Pos.	Rider	Team	Total
1	James Wright	Buxton	14
2	Mark Burrows	Wimbledon	12
3	Richard Hall	Boston	12
4	Matthew Wethers	Armadale	11
5	Steve Boxall	Rye House	10
6	Chris Schramm	Oxford	10
7	David Mason	Weymouth	10
8	Barrie Evans	Wimbledon	8
9	Malcolm Holloway	Swindon	6
10	Dean Felton	Carmarthen	6
11	Jamie Westacott	Newport	5
12	Ritchie Hawkins	Mildenhall	5
13	Justin Elkins	Stoke	3
14	Jamie Robertson	Newcastle	3
15	Lee Smart	Mildenhall	2
16	Joel Parsons	Rye House	1
17	Karl Mason (res)	Coventry	1
18	Jack Hargreaves (res)	Stoke	0

== Pairs ==
The Pairs Championship was held at the Wimbledon Stadium, on 2 June. The event was won by Mark Burrows and Barrie Evans of the Wimbledon.

Final

- Wimbledon (Burrows & Evans) bt Mildenhall (Hawkins & Armstrong)

== Fours ==
Mildenhall won the Conference League Four-Team Championship, held on 10 July 2004 at Loomer Road Stadium.

Group A
Pos	Team	Pts	Riders
1	Stoke	17	
2	Mildenhall	12	
3	Carmarthen	11	
4	Boston	7	

Group B
Pos	Team	Pts	Riders
1	Newcastle	15	
2	Wimbledon	15	
3	Buxton	9	
4	Weymouth	9	

Final
Pos	Team	Pts	Riders
1	Mildenhall	16	
2	Newcastle	13	
2	Wimbledon	13	Burrows, Evans, Broadhurst
4	Stoke	6	Grant

== See also ==
List of United Kingdom Speedway League Champions
