= 2001 Speedway Conference League =

British motorcycle speedway season

- League: Conference League
- Champions: Sheffield Prowlers
- Knockout Cup: Somerset Rebels
- Conference Trophy: Somerset Rebels
- Individual: David Mason
- Division/s above: 2001 Elite League; 2001 Premier League

The 2001 Speedway Conference League was the third tier/division of British speedway.

== Summary ==
The title was won by Sheffield Prowlers, the junior club belonging to the Sheffield Tigers.

== Final league table ==
Pos	Team	Played	W	D	L	F	A	Pts	Bonus	Total
1	Sheffield Prowlers	14	11	0	3	735½	518½	22	7	29
2	Somerset Rebels	14	10	0	4	716½	541½	20	6	26
3	Boston Barracudas	14	8	1	5	625	638	17	4	21
4	Rye House Rockets	14	7	1	6	647	608	15	4	19
5	Peterborough Pumas	14	5	0	9	617	638	10	4	14
6	Buxton Hitmen	14	6	0	8	601	653	12	2	14
7	Newport Mavericks	14	4	0	10	556	698	8	1	9
8	Mildenhall Fen Tigers	14	4	0	10	525	728	8	0	8

== Fixtures & results ==
Home \ Away	BOS	BUX	MIL	NEW	PET	RYE	SHE	SOM
Boston Barracudas		54–36	55–35	56–34	57–33	45–45	32–59	34–56
Buxton Hitmen	42–48		56–34	57–33	48–42	47–41	48–41	39–50
Mildenhall Fen Tigers	40–49	47–43		49–41	48–41	46–44	41–47	41–50
Newport Mavericks	44–46	36–53	57–32		49–41	51–39	48–40	38–52
Peterborough Pumas	40–53	54–35	60–27	51–38		49–40	35–55	53–37
Rye House Rockets	49–41	51–39	63–27	70–19	47–43		46–44	45–44
Sheffield Prowlers	61–29	59–31	58–32	62–28	47–42	59–31		58–32
Somerset Rebels	64–26	63–27	64–26	50–40	57–33	54–36	43.5–45.5	

Legend: Blue = home team win; Yellow = draw; Red = away team win.

== Conference League Knockout Cup ==
The 2001 Conference League Knockout Cup was the fourth edition of the Knockout Cup for tier three teams. Somerset Rebels were the winners.

First round

Team one	Team two	Score
Newport	Somerset	48–42, 36–54
Buxton	Sheffield	41–49, 39–51
Peterborough	Mildenhall	46–44, 36–54
Rye House	Boston	51–39, 40–50

Semi-finals

Team one	Team two	Score
Rye House	Sheffield	63–26, 41–49
Somerset	Mildenhall	55–35, 55–35

=== Final ===
20 October

Rye House Rockets; Chris Courage 14; David Mason 10; Simon Wolstenholme 5 Phil Ambrose 3 James Cockle 2 Dan Giffard 3 Darren Andrews 2	38–52	Somerset Rebels; Jamie Smith 11; Gary Phelps 10; Jarno Kosonen 10; Steve Bishop 8 Nick Simmons 6 Simon Phillips 5 Matthew Cross 2	Rye House Stadium

26 October

Somerset Rebels; Gary Phelps 14; Steve Bishop 13; Jamie Smith 12; Simon Phillips 8 Jarno Kosonen 6 Matthew Cross 4 Tim Healey 0	57–33	Rye House Rockets; David Mason 10; Simon Wolstenholme 7 Chris Courage 7 Phil Ambrose 5 James Cockle 2 Ed Kennett 1 Dan Giffard 1	Oaktree Arena

== Conference Trophy ==
Pos	Team	M	W	D	L	Pts
1	Somerset	8	6	0	2	12
2	Boston	8	6	0	2	12
3	Rye House	8	5	0	3	10
4	Mildenhall	8	3	0	5	6
5	Buxton	8	0	0	8	0

Home \ Away	BOS	BUX	MIL	RYE	SOM
Boston		60–30	58–31	48–42	52–38
Buxton	40–49		44–46	28–61	34–56
Mildenhall	43–45	65–25		47–43	37–52
Rye House	55–34	62–28	47–43		49–41
Somerset	55–35	52–38	58–32	48–42	

Legend: Blue = home team win; Yellow = draw; Red = away team win.

Final

Team one	Team two	Score
Boston	Somerset	49–40, 26–64

== Riders' Championship ==
David Mason won the Riders' Championship. The final was held on 8 September at Rye House Stadium.

Pos.	Rider	Team	Total
1	David Mason	Rye House	13
2	Scott Pegler	Newport	12
3	Simon Wolstenholme	Rye House	12
4	James Mann	Buxton	11
5	Gavin Hedge	Mildenhall	10
6	Jason King	Peterborough	9
7	Carl Wilkinson	Boston	8
8	Barrie Evans	Mildenhall	8
9	Malcolm Holloway	Somerset	6
10	Luke Clifton	Boston	5
11	Daniel Giffard	Rye House	5
12	Chris Courage	Rye House	5
13	Ricky Scarboro	Boston	4
14	Nick Simmons	Somerset	4
15	Rory Schlein	Sheffield	3
16	Chris Collins	Buxton	3

== See also ==
List of United Kingdom Speedway League Champions
