= Iwade Speedway =

Stadium in Kent, England

- Location: Marshbank Farm; The Old Gun Site; Old Ferry Road; Sittingbourne ME9 8SP
- Coordinates: 51°23′24″N 0°43′44″E
- Operator: Motorcycle speedway

Iwade Speedway is a motorcycle speedway venue approximately four miles north of Sittingbourne in Kent. The track is located off Old Ferry Road, on the site of a former gun site.

== History ==
The Iwade training track was initially built in 1971 by Ivor Thomas and his brother, former Hackney Hawks rider Barry Thomas, whilst he was still a rider for the Canterbury Crusaders. The site would later serve as the Swale Banger Racing Iwade Raceway. The site was then taken over by Chris Galvin (father of Andy Galvin).

In 1986, Wally Mawdsley retired and the Kingsmead Stadium and Canterbury Crusaders, lease was taken over by Chris Galvin. Galvin would allow the Canterbury riders to practice on the Iwade training track but unfortunately the team was forced to disband on 31 October 1987, when the Canterbury Council refused to renew the Kingsmead Stadium lease.

However, the Iwade Speedway track continued as a training track until 1994, when a new team called Iwade Kent Crusaders would race there during the 1994 British League Division Three season. When the Canterbury Crusaders closed in 1987, the supporters club remained active in attempts to bring back speedway to Kent. They helped improve the Iwade training track to league standards and led by promoter Terry Whibberley who spent over £80,000 in improving the track, it was ready for racing. However, the year was a disaster, in January a young rider called Karl Nicholls was tragically killed in practice and at the end of July, Whibberley pulled out due to poor health and put the track up for sale, resulting in the team withdrawing from the league.

The Iwade site was bought by a consortium that included Graham Arnold and Peter Mason and the team lined up for the 1995 Academy League season, under the new team name of Sittingbourne Crusaders. The 1996 season then saw the club suffer problems when Swale Council stated that the planning permission given in 1971 was a 25-year temporary agreement. Graham Arnold applied for a lawful development certificate.

The team did return to race again at the track from 2004 to 2008 before folding for good and the track would not see league racing again until 2022, when the Kent Kings arrived to race, having been kicked out of Central Park Stadium.

== See also ==
- Kent Kings
- Sittingbourne Crusaders
