= 1996 Premier League speedway season =

British motorcycle speedway season

- League: Premier League
- Champions: Wolverhampton Wolves
- Knockout Cup: Wolverhampton Wolves
- Individual: Sam Ermolenko
- Fours: Oxford Cheetahs
- Highest average: Billy Hamill
- Division/s below: 1996 Conference League

The 1996 Premier League season was the 62nd season of the top tier of speedway in the United Kingdom. It was also the second and last edition of two seasons, in which British speedway was competed as a single division. In addition there was a Conference League.

As from 1997 the Elite League would be the top division and the Premier League would be the second division.

== Team changes ==
Cradley Heathens and Stoke Potters merged for the 1996 season and Arena Essex Hammers dropped out of the league with the promotion moving to Hackney Wick Stadium and racing as the London Lions. The Glasgow Tigers and Edinburgh Monarchs effectively merged because the Edinburgh promotion raced at Shawfield Stadium under the name the Scottish Monarchs. Oxford reverted to their traditional name of Cheetahs, after ditching the unpopular Silver Machine and King's Lynn Stars did not participate during 1996.

== Summary ==
Many Glasgow Tigers fans refused to support what they saw as their team of old rivals, and although Monarchs fans initially travelled to Glasgow, crowd numbers soon fell. Cradley & Stoke, despite having the American stars Billy Hamill and Greg Hancock finishing first and second in the averages, could only manage fifth place in the league. Cradley Heath were disbanded after the season following the closure of Dudley Wood Stadium, their home venue. Oxford reverted to their popular name of Cheetahs and

The one league set up only lasted for 1995 and 1996, due to the huge disparity between the teams. Wolverhampton Wolves won the title for the second time in six years, with American Ronnie Correy being the sole survivor of the 1991 winning team. In a strange coincidence a new set of two brothers helped Wolves win the title, back in 1991 it was the Ermolenko brothers but now it was the Swedish Karlsson brothers. Peter Karlsson and Mikael Karlsson both scored heavily and ended the season with averages around the 10 mark.

== Final table ==
Pos	Team	PL	W	D	L	BP	Pts
1	Wolverhampton Wolves	36	29	0	7	18	76
2	Peterborough Panthers	36	23	0	13	15	61
3	Eastbourne Eagles	36	23	1	12	12	59
4	Swindon Robins	36	22	2	12	12	58
5	Cradley & Stoke Heathens	36	21	1	14	13	56
6	Belle Vue Aces	36	21	1	14	12	55
7	Hull Vikings	36	20	3	13	11	54
8	Ipswich Witches	36	20	0	16	12	52
9	London Lions	36	20	0	16	11	51
10	Coventry Bees	36	16	2	18	10	44
11	Bradford Dukes	36	16	0	20	9	41
12	Scottish Monarchs	36	16	0	20	5	37
13	Oxford Cheetahs	36	12	4	20	8	36
14	Poole Pirates	36	13	2	21	5	33
15	Exeter Falcons	36	13	2	21	4	32
16	Middlesbrough Bears	36	11	1	14	6	29
17	Long Eaton Invaders	36	12	0	24	4	28
18	Sheffield Tigers	36	13	0	23	2	28
19	Reading Racers	36	11	1	24	2	25

PL = Matches; W = Wins; D = Draws; L = Losses; BP = Bonus Points Pts = Total Points

=== Fixtures & results ===
Home \ Away	BV	BD	COV	CH	EAS	EX	HV	IPS	LL	LE	MID	OX	PET	PP	RR	SHE	SM	SWI	WOL
Belle Vue Aces		51–45	53–43	57–39	58–38	62–34	56–40	51–45	58–38	55–41	63–33	54–42	59–37	54–42	67–29	41–28	60–36	47–49	43–53
Bradford Dukes	51–45		43–53	51–45	46–50	51–45	53–42	55–41	46–50	43–29	62–34	45–51	42–54	55–41	57–39	56–40	61–35	57–39	52–44
Coventry Bees	59–37	42–54		50–46	51–45	58–38	64–32	54–42	45–51	57–39	52–44	55–41	46–50	41–55	60–36	73–20	62–34	44–52	54–41
Cradley & Stoke Heathens	46–50	53–43	56–40		44–52	54–42	46–50	43–53	60–36	56–40	55–41	53–42	58–38	60–36	52–43	56–40	55–41	53–43	43–52
Eastbourne Eagles	56–40	62–33	55–41	46–50		62–34	57–38	53–43	56–38	58–38	58–38	58–38	51–45	55–41	52–44	58–38	52–43	52–44	45–50
Exeter Falcons	56–39	53–43	51–45	49–47	48–48		43–53	57–39	46–50	46–50	52–44	48–48	52–44	57–39	44–52	60–36	54–42	51–45	52–44
Hull Vikings	52–43	49–47	58–37	48–48	59–37	60–36		58–38	52–41	53–43	54–42	55–41	55–41	61–35	63–33	63–33	54–42	54–41	47–49
Ipswich Witches	55–41	52–43	50–46	58–38	55–41	64–32	66–30		52–44	58–38	61–35	52–44	50–46	50–46	57–39	65–31	66–30	59–37	50–46
London Lions	47–49	52–44	51–45	49–47	43–51	57–39	46–50	56–40		52–43	60–36	40–32	50–46	50–46	53–43	62–28	45–51	64–32	50–46
Long Eaton Invaders	49–47	50–46	55–41	45–50	46–50	53–43	40–56	50–46	49–47		52–44	49–47	42–48	46–50	59–37	56–39	53–43	45–51	45–51
Middlesbrough Bears	59–37	54–42	48–48	37–59	39–56	44–52	56–39	49–47	55–40	64–32		46–49	48–47	57–38	56–40	63–33	61–35	47–49	43–53
Oxford Cheetahs	45–51	47–48	45–51	43–53	41–54	56–40	48–48	50–46	43–53	55–41	63–33		51–45	57–39	45–49	52–42	55–41	48–48	43–53
Peterborough Panthers	59–37	61–35	56–40	51–45	57–39	60–36	55–41	54–42	50–46	59–37	59–37	55–41		55–41	70–26	62–34	56–40	50–46	56–40
Poole Pirates	51–45	55–41	48–48	40–56	53–43	52–44	57–39	53–43	45–51	53–43	51–45	48–48	46–50		53–42	54–42	51–45	34–44	45–51
Reading Racers	48–48	44–52	50–46	42–54	46–49	56–40	54–42	47–49	50.5–45.5	52–44	53–43	43–53	46–50	55–40		53–43	44–52	53–43	45–51
Sheffield Tigers	42–54	53–25	54–42	42–54	51–45	56–40	52–44	52–44	47–49	50–46	55–41	41–55	50–46	53–43	54–42		50–46	52–44	46–50
Scottish Monarchs	46–50	53–43	42–54	39–57	49–46	70–26	51–45	49–46	57–39	52–44	57–39	53–43	54–42	59–37	61–35	63–33		53–43	38–58
Swindon Robins	60–36	49–46	52–43	51–45	59–37	53–43	48–48	56–39	53–43	55–41	68–28	53–43	56–40	52–44	56–40	61–35	56–40		52–44
Wolverhampton Wolves	58–37	60–36	55–40	53–43	53–41	65–31	53–42	60–36	61–35	53–42	72–24	65–31	56–40	64–31	56–40	57–38	65–31	59–37	

Legend: Blue = home team win; Yellow = draw; Red = away team win.

== Premier League Knockout Cup ==
The 1996 Speedway Star Knockout Cup was the 58th edition of the Knockout Cup for tier one teams and the second with the name Premier League Knockout Cup. Wolverhampton Wolves were the winners of the competition. The following season the tier one teams would compete in the Elite League Knockout Cup and the Premier League Knockout Cup would be for tier two teams.

The cup was won by Wolverhampton despite the fact that they had to ride their home fixture at Long Eaton Stadium due to Monmore Green undergoing work to the greyhound track.

First round

Date	Team one	Score	Team two
20/04	Bradford	65-31	Sheffield
18/04	Sheffield	42-54	Bradford
24/04	Hull	56-40	Middlesbrough
23/05	Middlesbrough	50-45	Hull
04/05	Swindon	51-45	Oxford
26/04	Oxford	50-46	Swindon

Second round

Date	Team one	Score	Team two
20/05	Wolverhampton	56-39	Ipswich
23/05	Ipswich	53-43	Wolverhampton
24/05	Belle Vue	53-43	Cradley Heath
13/07	Cradley Heath	52-44	Belle Vue
25/05	Bradford	57-39	Edinburgh
22/05	Edinburgh	44-52	Bradford
29/05	Long Eaton	56-40	Hull
31/05	Hull	47-49	Long Eaton
26/04	Peterborough	59-37	Coventry
25/05	Coventry	40-56	Peterborough
23/05	Hackney	54-42	Reading
13/05	Reading	40-56	Hackney
20/05	Exeter	45-51	Poole
26/06	Poole	44-52	Exeter
27/05	Swindon	59-37	Eastbourne
25/05	Eastbourne	56-39	Swindon

Quarter-finals

Date	Team one	Score	Team two
19/08	Wolverhampton	48-48	Belle Vue
23/08	Belle Vue	48-48	Wolverhampton
24/08	Bradford	62-34	Long Eaton
28/08	Long Eaton	50-45	Bradford
23/08	Peterborough	52-44	Hackney
15/08	Hackney	51-45	Peterborough
09/09	Exeter	52-44	Swindon
17/08	Swindon	48-48	Exeter
09/09	Wolverhampton	51-45	Belle Vue
13/09	Belle Vue	49-46	Wolverhampton

Semi-finals

Date	Team one	Score	Team two
23/09	Wolverhampton	59-37	Bradford
28/09	Bradford	54-42	Wolverhampton
13/09	Peterborough	61-35	Exeter
23/09	Exeter	48-48	Peterborough

=== Final ===
First leg

9 October 1996

Wolverhampton Wolves Peter Karlsson 14 Mikael Karlsson 12 Ronnie Correy 12 George Štancl 7 Stewart McDonald 7 Jamies Grieves 6 Craig Taylor 0	58 - 38	Peterborough Panthers Jason Crump 13 Ryan Sullivan 10 Marián Jirout 7 Rene Madsen 4 Scott Swain 2 Zdeněk Tesař 2 Anders Nielsen 0

Long Eaton Stadium

Second leg

18 October 1996

Peterborough Panthers Brian Andersen (guest) 12 Jason Crump 11 Ryan Sullivan 11 Marián Jirout 6 Rene Madsen 6 Scott Swain 5 Anders Nielsen 3	54 - 42	Wolverhampton Wolves Mikael Karlsson 16 Peter Karlsson 8 Ronnie Correy 8 George Štancl 4 Stewart McDonald 4 Jamies Grieves 2 Craig Taylor 0

East of England Showground

Wolverhampton Wolves were declared Knockout Cup Champions, winning on aggregate 100-92.

== Riders' Championship ==
Sam Ermolenko won the Premier League Riders Championship, held at Odsal Stadium on 19 October. It was the third time that Ermolenko had won the Riders' Championship trophy but the most fortunate. He had qualified for the semi finals with just 7 points and then won the final when Chris Louis was leading on the final lap before suffering an engine failure.

Pos.	Rider	Total	SF	Final
1	(United States) Sam Ermolenko	7	2	3
2	(Australia) Jason Crump	12	3	2
3	(Australia) Leigh Adams	10	2	1
4	(England) Chris Louis	11	3	ef
5	(Italy) Armando Castagna	8	1	
6	(Sweden) Jimmy Nilsen	8	1	
7	(Denmark) Brian Andersen	7	0	
8	(Sweden) Peter Karlsson	7	0	
9	(England) Joe Screen	7		
10	(Australia) Craig Boyce	6		
11	(England) Mark Loram	6		
12	(United States) Mike Faria	6		
13	(England) Sean Wilson	4		
14	(England) Martin Dugard	4		
15	(Australia) Steve Johnston	4		
16	(United States) Billy Hamill	3		
17	(United States) Chris Manchester	3		
18	(Czech Republic) Tomáš Topinka	3		
19	(Denmark) Jan Staechmann	3		
20	(Australia) Shane Parker	1		

- ef=engine failure

== Fours ==
Oxford Cheetahs won the Premier League Four-Team Championship, which was held on 4 August 1996, at the East of England Arena.

Group A
Pos	Team	Pts	Riders
1	Hull	14	Ott 5, Morton 4, Thorp 3, Grahame 2
2	Oxford	13	Cox 6, Topinka 4, Brhel 3, Hare 0
3	Poole	12	Boyce 6, Gunnestad 4, Andersson 2, Richardson 0, Willis 0
4	Wolves	9	Karlsson M 3, Karlsson P 3, McDonald 3, Grieves 0

Group B
Pos	Team	Pts	Riders
1	Peterborough	13	Crump 5, Jirout 5
2	Ipswich	13	Louis 5, Clouting 4
3	Belle Vue	11	Klingberg 4, Lyons 4
4	Bradford	11	Screen 5, Smith 5

Final
Pos	Team	Pts	Riders
1	Oxford	23	Cox 7, Brhel 7, Topinka 7, Hare 3
2	Peterborough	17	Crump 8, Jirout 6, Swain 2, Nielsen 1
3	Hull	16	Ott 6, Grahame 4, Thorp 3, Morton 3
4	Ipswich	16	Louis 6, Doncaster 6, Howe 3, Clouting 1

== Leading final averages ==
Rider	Team	Average
(United States) Billy Hamill	Cradley & Stoke	10.67
(United States) Greg Hancock	Cradley & Stoke	10.55
(England) Chris Louis	Ipswich	10.29
(Australia) Jason Crump	Peterborough	10.20
(Sweden) Peter Karlsson	Wolverhampton	10.14
(Australia) Leigh Adams	London	10.09
(England) Martin Dugard	Eastbourne	10.08
(United States) Sam Ermolenko	Sheffield	9.73
(Sweden) Mikael Karlsson	Wolverhampton	9.71
(United States) Ronnie Correy	Wolverhampton	9.62
(England) Joe Screen	Bradford	9.57
(England) Gary Havelock	Bradford	9.55
(Denmark) Brian Andersen	Coventry	9.46
(Australia) Craig Boyce	Poole	9.38
(England) Mark Loram	Exeter	9.28
(England) Chris Manchester	Belle Vue	9.27
(Sweden) Jimmy Nilsen	Swindon	9.22
(Norway) Lars Gunnestad	Poole	9.13
(England) Kelvin Tatum	London	9.07
(Australia) Ryan Sullivan	Peterborough	9.01

== Riders & final averages ==
Belle Vue

- (United States) Chris Manchester 9.27
- (Australia) Jason Lyons 8.14
- (Denmark) Frede Schött 7.37
- (Sweden) Niklas Klingberg 7.33
- (England) Neil Collins 6.68
- (United States) Charlie Venegas 6.32
- (England) Andre Compton 3.84
- (England) Wayne Carter 3.56
- (England) Sean Courtney 3.33
- (England) Chris Cobby 2.56
- (England) Phil Knowles 0.52

Bradford

- (England) Joe Screen 9.57
- (England) Gary Havelock 9.55
- (England) Andy Smith 7.76
- (England) Sean Wilson 7.52
- (England) Paul Pickering 4.74
- (England) Andre Compton 4.42
- (Australia) Glyn Taylor 3.07
- (Estonia) Rene Aas 2.65
- (England) Chris Readshaw 1.73

Coventry

- (Denmark) Brian Andersen 9.46
- (Australia) Shane Bowes 7.29
- (England) Simon Cross 7.11
- (Denmark) Jan Andersen 6.83
- (England) Shaun Tacey 6.35
- (England) Paul Bentley 6.24
- (England) Stuart Robson 5.33
- (Scotland) Kevin Little 4.20

Cradley & Stoke

- (United States) Billy Hamill 10.67
- (United States) Greg Hancock 10.55
- (Sweden) Daniel Andersson 6.36
- (England) Les Collins 6.21
- (Sweden) Niklas Karlsson 5.08
- (England) John Wilson 4.85
- (England) Troy Pratt 4.67
- (England) Stuart Swales 3.58

Eastbourne

- (England) Martin Dugard 10.08
- (Sweden) Stefan Andersson 8.98
- (England) David Norris 7.89
- (Sweden) Stefan Dannö 7.34
- (England) Alan Mogridge 5.40
- (England) Dean Standing 5.30
- (England) Justin Elkins 3.00
- (England) Darren Grayling 2.54
- (England) Tara O'Callaghan 0.47

Exeter

- (England) Mark Loram 9.28
- (England) Simon Wigg 8.83
- (England) Michael Coles 6.50
- (England) Alun Rossiter 6.50
- (England) Paul Fry 5.96
- (England) Peter Jeffery 4.79
- (England) Mark Simmonds 4.67
- (England) Graeme Gordon 2.66

Hull

- (United States) Bobby Ott 8.58
- (Denmark) Jan Stæchmann 8.44
- (England) Paul Thorp 8.30
- (England) Graham Jones 7.00
- (England) Ray Morton 6.89
- (England) Alan Grahame 6.85
- (England) Nigel Crabtree 6.16
- (Hungary) Róbert Nagy 5.66
- (England) Mike Hampson 2.32
- (England) Lee Dicken 1.90

Ipswich

- (England) Chris Louis 10.29
- (England) Jeremy Doncaster 7.63
- (England) Scott Nicholls 7.46
- (England) Ben Howe 7.42
- (England) Savalas Clouting 5.74
- (England) Leigh Lanham 5.49
- (England) Kevin Teager 3.30

London

- (Australia) Leigh Adams 10.09
- (England) Kelvin Tatum 9.07
- (England) Paul Hurry 7.63
- (United States) Josh Larsen 7.35
- (England) Neville Tatum 6.07
- (Denmark) Jan Pedersen 5.04
- (England) John Wainwright 3.57
- (England) Alan Mogridge 3.48
- (England) Colin White 1.90
- (England) David Mason 1.70

Long Eaton

- (Hungary) Róbert Nagy 8.57
- (Australia) Steve Johnston 8.28
- (England) Carl Stonehewer 6.73
- (England) Martin Dixon 6.57
- (United States) Charles Ermolenko 6.37
- (Finland) Kai Laukkanen 6.26
- (Sweden) Robert Johansson 6.00
- (United States) Brent Werner 5.60
- (Denmark) Rene Madsen 4.00
- (United States) Charlie Venegas 3.49

Middlesbrough

- (England) Shane Parker 8.67
- (Czech Republic) Antonín Šváb Jr. 6.78
- (England) David Walsh 6.78
- (England) Stuart Robson 6.23
- (Denmark) Jesper Olsen 5.85
- (England) Scott Robson 5.82
- (England) Martin Dixon 4.86
- (Denmark) Martin Vinther 3.59

Oxford

- (Czech Republic) Tomáš Topinka 8.58
- (England) Marvyn Cox 8.32
- (Czech Republic) Bo Brhel 7.76
- (Australia) Mark Lemon 6.88
- (England) Martin Goodwin 5.27
- (England) Lawrence Hare 5.16
- (Hungary) Attila Stefáni (Mark Frost) 3.74
- (France) Philippe Bergé 3.57
- (England) Martin Willis 1.73

Peterborough

- (Australia) Jason Crump 10.20
- (Australia) Ryan Sullivan 9.01
- (Czech Republic) Zdeněk Tesař 8.94
- (Czech Republic) Marián Jirout 6.22
- (England) Alun Rossiter 5.44
- (Denmark) Anders Nielsen 4.90
- (England) Scott Swain 4.65
- (Denmark) Rene Madsen 4.60
- (England) Tommy Palmer 4.00

Poole

- (Australia) Craig Boyce 9.38
- (Norway) Lars Gunnestad 9.13
- (England) Steve Schofield 8.05
- (Australia) Tony Langdon 5.96
- (Sweden) Christer Jonsson 4.53
- (Sweden) Marcus Andersson 4.38
- (Sweden) Magnus Zetterström 3.11
- (Norway) Ingar Hvamstad 2.07
- (England) Lee Richardson 2.01

Reading

- (Sweden) Tony Olsson 8.12
- (Italy) Armando Castagna 7.69
- (England) Ray Morton 7.20
- (England) Dave Mullett 6.86
- (Finland) Petri Kokko 5.84
- (Zimbabwe) Davd Steen 5.02
- (England) Phil Morris 4.76
- (Denmark) Jan Pedersen 4.55
- (Germany) Jorg Pingel 4.54

Scottish Monarchs

- (United States) Mike Faria 8.53
- (Sweden) Robert Eriksson 6.58
- (Scotland) Kenny McKinna 6.31
- (Scotland) Scott Lamb 6.30
- (Australia) Mick Powell 6.02
- (Sweden) Robert Johansson 5.86
- (Finland) Vesa Ylinen 5.67
- (Italy) Stefano Alfonso 5.67

Sheffield

- (United States) Sam Ermolenko 9.73
- (Germany) Robbie Kessler 6.71
- (England) Garry Stead 6.69
- (England) Scott Smith 6.23
- (Hungary) Zoltán Adorján 6.22
- (Czech Republic) Roman Matoušek 5.58
- (England) Tony Atkin 3.65
- (Germany) Mirko Wolter 3.48
- (Estonia) Rene Aas 2.71
- (Denmark) Thomas Ravn 2.67

Swindon

- (Sweden) Jimmy Nilsen 9.22
- (Denmark) Brian Karger 8.99
- (Denmark) John Jørgensen 8.43
- (New Zealand) Mark Thorpe 7.05
- (England) Steve Masters 5.13
- (England) Glenn Cunningham 4.73
- (Finland) Jarno Kosonen 4.45
- (England) Scott Pegler 1.70

Wolverhampton

- (Sweden) Peter Karlsson 10.14
- (Sweden) Mikael Karlsson 9.71
- (United States) Ronnie Correy 9.62
- (Czech Republic) George Štancl 6.12
- (Scotland) James Grieves 5.11
- (Scotland) Stewart McDonald 4.74
- (England) Craig Taylor 3.41

== See also ==
- List of United Kingdom Speedway League Champions
- Knockout Cup (speedway)
