= 1999 Speedway Conference League =

British motorcycle speedway season

- League: Conference League
- Champions: Newport Mavericks
- Knockout Cup: St Austell Gulls
- Individual: Jonathan Swales
- Division/s above: 1999 Elite League; 1999 Premier League

The 1999 Speedway Conference League was the third tier/division of British speedway.

== Summary ==
The title was won by Newport Mavericks, the junior club belonging to the Newport Wasps.

== Final league table ==
Pos	Team	Played	W	D	L	F	A	Pts
1	Newport Mavericks	12	10	0	2	606	465	20
2	St Austell Gulls	12	8	1	3	620	460	17
3	Buxton Hitmen	12	7	1	4	582	484	15
4	Rye House Rockets	12	6	0	6	484	586	12
5	Mildenhall Fen Tigers	12	4	0	8	521	547	8
6	Linlithgow Lightning	12	4	0	8	478	589	8
7	King's Lynn Braves	12	2	0	10	455	615	4

== Fixtures & results ==
Home \ Away	BUX	KL	LIN	MIL	NEW	RYE	SA
Buxton Hitmen		58–31	58–31	51–37	60–29	52–37	45–45
King's Lynn Braves	47–43		44–46	51–39	35–55	40–48	37–53
Linlithgow Lightning	35–54	54–34		44–45	39–49	51–38	46–44
Mildenhall Fen Tigers	40–43	58–32	57–32		38–52	48–41	42–48
Newport Mavericks	55–35	56–32	59–28	56–34		66–23	48–42
Rye House Rockets	48–42	44–43	48–41	50–40	56–34		28–62
St Austell Gulls	49–41	61–29	59–31	47–43	43–47	67–23	

Legend: Blue = home team win; Yellow = draw; Red = away team win.

== Conference League Knockout Cup ==
The 1999 Conference League Knockout Cup was the second edition of the Knockout Cup for tier three teams. St Austell Gulls were the winners for the second successive year.

First round

Team 1	Team 2	Score
Newport	Rye House	57–32, 43–47
Linlithgow	Buxton	23–67, 39–51
King's Lynn	Mildenhall	45–44, 38–52

Semi-finals

Team 1	Team 2	Score
Buxton	Newport	43–47, 32–56
St Austell	Mildenhall	52–38, 45–45

=== Final ===
16 October

Newport Mavericks; Andrew Appleton 15	52–38	St Austell Gulls; Seemond Stephens 14	Hayley Stadium

24 October

St Austell Gulls; Adrian Newman 18	55–35	Newport Mavericks; Chris Neath 13	Clay Country Moto Parc

== Riders' Championship ==
Jonathan Swales won the Riders' Championship. The final was held on 14 August at Mildenhall Stadium.

Pos.	Rider	Team	Total
1	Jonathan Swales	Linlithgow	15
2	Steve Camden	Mildenhall	13
3	Scott Courtney	Linlithgow	11
4	Andrew Appleton	Newport	10
5	Peter Collyer	Rye House	8
6	Peter Boast	King's Lynn	7
7	Bobby Eldridge	Newport	7
8	Adrian Newman	St. Austell	7
9	Barrie Evans	Mildenhall	7
10	Simon Wolstenholme	Rye House	6
11	Philip Knowles	Cradley Heath	6
12	Neil Painter	Buxton	5
13	Luke Clifton	King's Lynn	5
14	Garry Sweet	Mildenhall	5
15	Paul Burnett	Buxton	5
16	Luke Clifton	King's Lynn	5
17	Neil Painter	Buxton	5
18	Martin Williams	St. Austell	2
19	Jamie Barton (res)	Rye House	1

== See also ==
- List of United Kingdom Speedway League Champions
- Knockout Cup (speedway)
