= 1996 Speedway Conference League =

British motorcycle speedway season

- League: Conference League
- Season: 1996
- No. of competitors: 13
- Champions: Linlithgow Lightning
- Knockout Cup: Linlithgow Lightning
- Individual: Mike Hampson
- Division/s above: 1996 Premier League

The 1996 Speedway Conference League was the inaugural season of the Conference League, which was the second tier of British motorcycle speedway. It was listed as the second tier of British speedway because during 1995 and 1996 the two divisions of the British League had merged into one division only. The following season it would be a third tier/division competition.

== Summary ==
The Conference League was the first to be promoted under the name and was an entirely amateur competition contested by thirteen teams (many were junior sides belonging to their parent clubs). The league expanded from the eight that had begun the previous season's 1995 Academy League - Berwick, Buxton, Devon, Linlithgow, Mildenhall, and Sittingbourne all returned from 1995, and were joined by Arena Essex, Eastbourne, Owlerton, Peterborough, Reading, Ryde, and Swindon. Stoke and Cleveland did not return from 1995.

As not all fixtures were able to be run, the champions were decided by a percentage of total points available. Linlithgow Lightning topped the table to become champions.

== Final table ==
Pos	Team	PL	W	D	L	Pts	%
1	Linlithgow Lightning	23	18	0	5	36	78
2	Devon Demons	11	7	1	3	15	68
3	Berwick Bandits	12	8	0	4	16	66
4	Ryde Wight Wizards	19	12	1	6	25	65
5	Swindon Sprockets	12	7	0	5	14	58
6	Arena Essex Hammers	27	14	1	12	29	53
7	Mildenhall Fen Tigers	19	10	0	9	20	52
8	Buxton Hitmen	21	10	2	9	22	52
9	Peterborough Thundercats	13	5	1	7	11	42
10	Owlerton Prowlers	12	5	0	7	10	41
11	Reading Ravens	13	5	0	8	10	38
12	Eastbourne Starlets	16	1	2	13	4	12
13	Sittingbourne Crusaders	18	1	2	15	4	11

PL = Matches; W = Wins; D = Draws; L = Losses; Pts = Match Points; % = Win Rate

== Fixtures and results ==
A fixtures

Home \ Away	AE	BER	BUX	DEV	EAS	LL	MIL	OW	PET	REA	RWW	SIT	SWI
Arena Essex Hammers		37–41	41–37	48–30	39–39	33–43	45–33	n/a	42–36	43–35	51–27	39–38	48–29
Berwick Bandits	52–26		42–36	n/a	56–22	50–27	51–27	49–29	n/a	n/a	n/a	n/a	n/a
Buxton Hitmen	53–25	44–34		39–39	44–32	40–38	47–31	45–31	46–31	n/a	58–20	53–25	n/a
Devon Demons	49–29	n/a	41–35		n/a	39–38	n/a	n/a	n/a	n/a	44–34	n/a	43–34
Eastbourne Starlets	37–40	n/a	n/a	n/a		29–48	31–45	n/a	n/a	24–29	31–45	47–31	n/a
Linlithgow Lightning	58–19	46–32	42–35	n/a	47–31		42–34	58–19	44–34	n/a	53–24	54–22	n/a
Mildenhall Fen Tigers	59–19	41–37	46–32	38–40	n/a	34–44		52–26	n/a	45–32	44–34	52–25	n/a
Owlerton Prowlers	42–35	40–38	41–37	n/a	n/a	38–40	44–34		43–34	n/a	n/a	n/a	n/a
Peterborough Thundercats	41–31	n/a	39–38	n/a	n/a	35–43	n/a	n/a		48–29	39–39	n/a	n/a
Reading Ravens	44–34	n/a	n/a	n/a	47–31	37–40	n/a	n/a	n/a		38–40	59–19	43–34
Ryde Wight Wizards	47–30	n/a	44–34	41–36	45–33	40–38	44–34	n/a	49–29	54–24		42–36	40–38
Sittingbourne Crusaders	36–41	n/a	39–39	38–40	39–39	28–50	32–46	n/a	32–44	n/a	52–26		36–42
Swindon Sprockets	48–30	n/a	n/a	43–35	46.5–31.5	42–36	n/a	n/a	40–38	49–29	n/a	n/a	

Legend: Blue = home team win; Yellow = draw; Red = away team win.

B fixtures

Home \ Away	AE	BER	BUX	DEV	EAS	LL	MIL	OW	PET	REA	RWW	SIT	SWI
Arena Essex Hammers		n/a	n/a	n/a	49–27	n/a	n/a	n/a	n/a	47–31	n/a	53–25	53–24
Berwick Bandits	n/a		n/a	n/a	n/a	n/a	n/a	n/a	n/a	n/a	n/a	n/a	n/a
Buxton Hitmen	n/a	n/a		n/a	n/a	n/a	n/a	41–36	n/a	n/a	n/a	n/a	n/a
Devon Demons	n/a	n/a	n/a		n/a	n/a	n/a	n/a	n/a	n/a	n/a	n/a	n/a
Eastbourne Starlets	n/a	n/a	n/a	n/a		n/a	n/a	n/a	n/a	n/a	n/a	n/a	n/a
Linlithgow Lightning	n/a	n/a	n/a	n/a	50–28		n/a	n/a	n/a	n/a	n/a	54–24	n/a
Mildenhall Fen Tigers	n/a	37–41	44–34	n/a	n/a	n/a		n/a	n/a	n/a	n/a	n/a	n/a
Owlerton Prowlers	n/a	n/a	n/a	n/a	n/a	n/a	n/a		n/a	n/a	n/a	n/a	n/a
Peterborough Thundercats	n/a	n/a	n/a	n/a	n/a	n/a	n/a	n/a		n/a	n/a	n/a	n/a
Reading Ravens	n/a	n/a	n/a	n/a	n/a	n/a	n/a	n/a	n/a		n/a	n/a	n/a
Ryde Wight Wizards	n/a	n/a	n/a	n/a	n/a	n/a	n/a	n/a	n/a	n/a		n/a	n/a
Sittingbourne Crusaders	n/a	n/a	n/a	n/a	n/a	n/a	n/a	n/a	n/a	n/a	n/a		n/a
Swindon Sprockets	n/a	n/a	n/a	n/a	n/a	n/a	n/a	n/a	n/a	n/a	n/a	n/a	

Legend: Blue = home team win; Yellow = draw; Red = away team win.

== Conference League Knockout Cup ==
The 1996 Conference League Knockout Cup was the 29th edition of the Knockout Cup for tier two teams.

It was only the tier two competition because the Division 1 & 2 had merged during 1995 & 1996, this meant that the newly formed Conference League was tier two of British speedway at the time. Linlithgow Lightning were the winners of the Cup.

First round

Dates	Team one	Team two	Scores
30/06, 02/08	Mildenhall	Arena Essex	56-22, 40-38
14/07, 01/09	Linlithgow	Buxton	46-31, 39-39

=== Final ===
First leg

6 October 1996

Linlithgow Peter Scully 15 Barry Campbell 11 Brian Turner 8 Grant McDonald 8 Blair Scott 4 Neil Hewitt 3 Brian Mercer 0	49 – 29	Mildenhall Geoff Powell 9 Peter Boast 8 Dean Garrod 6 Jonathan Swales 5 Tony Kingsbury 1 Charlie Whitwham 1 Colin Thorpe 0

Heathersfield Stadium

Second leg

12 October 1996

Mildenhall Jonathan Swales 13 Dean Garrod 8 Geoff Powell 8 Peter Boast 6 Tony Kingsbury 2 Jason Gage 1 Darren Smith 1	39 – 39	Linlithgow Barry Campbell 10 Peter Scully 10

Mildenhall Stadium

Linlithgow were declared Knockout Cup Champions, winning on aggregate 88–68.

== Riders' Championship ==
Mike Hampson won the Riders' Championship. The final was held on 7 September at Long Eaton Stadium.

Pos.	Rider	Team	Total
1	Mike Hampson	Buxton	12
2	Justin Elkins	Isle of Wight	12
3	Graeme Gordon	Exeter	12
4	David Mason	Sittingbourne	12
5	Paul Lee	Peterborough	10
6	Lee Dicken	Sheffield	9
7	Martin Willis	Isle of Wight	8
8	Barry Campbell	Linlithgow	8
9	Krister Marsh	Swindon	7
10	Dean Garrod	Mildenhall	6
11	Carl Checketts	Reading	6
12	Russell Etherington	Arena Essex	4
13	Roland Pollard	Arena Essex	4
14	Blair Scott	Linlithgow	3
15	Bobby Eldridge	Eastbourne	2
16	Anthony Barlow	Berwick	2
17	Paul Clews (res)	Peterborough	0

== Teams and riders ==
Arena Essex Hammers	CMA
Russell Etherington	8.11
Paul Lydes-Udings	7.91
Nathan Morton	6.82
Roland Pollard	6.68
Simon Wolstenholme	6.59
Darren Bolger	6.35
Andy Carfield	5.28
Gavin Pell	5.25
Phil Ranson	4.97
Ben Osborn	4.00
Jamie Barton	0.89

Berwick Bandits	CMA
David Blackburn	10.19
Glyn Taylor	9.19
Anthony Barlow	8.88
Richard Emson	8.00
William Beveridge	7.76
Peter Johnson	5.96
David McAllan	2.70
Michael Lowrie	8.67
Darren Pearson	2.67
Peter Grimwood	0.00

Buxton Hitmen	CMA
Mike Hampson	10.00
Jon Armstrong	8.77
Barry Ayres	8.00
Stephen Read	7.16
Dean Felton	7.13
Tony Howe	6.26
David Meldrum	6.10
Mark Harrison	4.38
Paul Macklin	2.18
Tony Atkin	12.00
Andre Compton	12.00
Graeme Gordon	10.67
Craig Taylor	9.75
Michael Lowrie	8.00
Drew Wheeldon	7.00
Elvis Jones	6.00
Jamie Young	6.00
Mark Burrows	4.00
Paul Fudge	4.00
Darren Matthews	2.67
Richard Moss	1.85
Jamie Isherwood	1.71
Geoff Batt	1.33
Neil Painter	1.00
David Nix	0.00
Paul Taylor	0.00

Devon Demons	CMA
Graeme Gordon	9.90
Paul Fudge	9.05
Roger Lobb	8.08
Greg Daniels	7.72
Kevin Phillips	4.84
Gary Lobb	4.00
Richard Ford	2.55
Mike Bowden	5.00
Andy Wilkinson	3.00
Wayne Holloway	0.00
Dave Ward	0.00
Nick Couch	0.00

Eastbourne Starlets	CMA
Paul Lydes-Udings	8.59
Brent Collyer	8.13
Bobby Eldridge	7.16
Steven Colvin	3.38
Richard Watts	2.91
Clive Seaby	2.87
Simon Moon	1.50
Dean Standing	12.00
Jason Bunyan	8.00
Tara O'Callaghan	7.82
Paul Taylor	7.56
Dean Chapman	7.44
David Meldrum	6.67
Justin Elkins	6.00
Scott Donovan	5.18
Mark Thompson	3.60
Nigel Roberts	3.50
Ian Clarke	2.80
Darren Grayling	0.00
Paul Bradford	0.00

Linlithgow Lightning	CMA
Peter Scully	9.81
Barry Campbell	9.43
Blair Scott	8.70
Brian Turner	8.43
Grant McDonald	7.74
Stuart Coleman	6.29
Brian Mercer	6.14
Neil Hewitt	5.76
Ian Milne	0.70
David Stokes	1.43
Mark Thompson	1.33
Andrew Swales	0.00

Mildenhall Fen Tigers	CMA
Geoff Powell	9.29
Jason Gage	9.00
Peter Boast	7.78
Dean Garrod	7.13
Jonathan Swales	6.71
Tony Kingsbury	5.48
Charlie Whitwam	1.64
Steve Knott	8.22
Mark Thompson	4.00
Dave Smith	4.00
Simon Brown	3.27
Richard Watts	1.33
Malcolm Hogg	0.00
Chris Simpson	0.00
Peter Grimwood	0.00
Colin Thorpe	0.00

Owlerton Prowlers	CMA
Derrol Keats	9.16
Lee Dicken	7.92
James Birkinshaw	7.37
Mark Blackwell	4.12
Glen Furniss	4.00
Andy Wilkinson	12.00
Charlie Whitwam	8.00
Philip Knowles	6.00
Neil Painter	5.25
Andy Buck	4.89
Paul Wyer	4.57
Phil Pickering	3.50
Aaron Baker	2.29
Simon Cartwright	1.82

Peterborough Thundercats	CMA
Paul Lee	9.00
Paul Clews	8.56
Jon Underwood	6.53
Gavin Hedge	5.60
Lee Dixon	5.48
Freddie Stephenson	4.42
Jason Newitt	2.10
Tommy Palmer	12.00
David Housley	0.00
Phil Pickering	0.00

Reading Ravens	CMA
Roger Lobb	9.93
Darren Andrews	8.89
Carl Checketts	7.85
Rob Cooling	4.53
Steve Targett	3.79
Mick Hester	3.25
Bill Haynes	0.60
Lee Richardson	11.64
Jason Gage	11.33
Lance Sealey	7.08
Karl Bainbridge	4.80
Patrice Deloubes	3.33
Steve Woolley	3.00
Mike Bowden	2.67
Damian Aplin	0.67
Steve Aston	0.00

Ryde Wizards	CMA
Václav Verner	11.38
Justin Elkins	11.17
Martin Willis	10.35
Mark Chessell	7.87
Colin Crook	5.25
Mike Bowden	4.88
Chris Simpson	2.86
Paul Oughton	2.85
Geoff Batt	2.71
Barry Bishop	1.26
Buck Blair	10.00
Simon Wolstenholme	6.50
Paul Taylor	6.00
Dean Garton	4.67
Ian Milne	4.00
Malcolm Hogg	3.00
Mark Czyz	2.80
Andrew Swales	2.00

Sittingbourne Crusaders	CMA
David Mason	11.38
Dean Chapman	5.68
Mark Czyz	5.37
John Curtis	4.17
Karl Armstrong	3.44
Andy Kerrison	3.33
Martyn Smith	2.67
Simon Wolstenholme	8.80
Gary Laker	8.00
Keith Yorke	7.20
Bobby Eldridge	6.25
Ben Osborn	4.67
Malcolm Smith	3.56
Ramon Majsa	3.27
Chris Simpson	2.67
Dean Norton	2.67
Mike Bowden	2.50
David Stokes	2.40
Karl Bainbridge	2.00
Mark Thompson	2.00
Andy Cooper	0.00

Swindon Sprockets	CMA
Scott Pegler	10.32
Krister Marsh	9.26
Keith Lansley	6.75
Gary Phelps	6.57
Scott Donovan	4.44
Martin Williams	4.11
Simon Paget	3.19
John Jeffries	9.78
Malcolm Holloway	9.33
Alan Spencer	6.00
Wayne Holloway	1.33
Richard Holloway	0.00

== See also ==
- List of United Kingdom Speedway League Champions
- Knockout Cup (speedway)
