= 2008 Speedway Conference League =

British motorcycle speedway season

- League: Conference League
- Champions: Weymouth Wildcats
- Knockout Cup: Plymouth Devils
- Individual: Benji Compton
- Pairs: Boston Barracudas
- Fours: Weymouth Wildcats
- Division/s above: 2008 Elite League; 2008 Premier League

The 2008 Speedway Conference League was the third tier/division of British speedway.

== Summary ==
The title was won by Weymouth Wildcats who won the playoffs.

== Final league table ==
Pos	Team	Played	HW	HD	HL	AW	AD	AL	F	A	Pts
1	Plymouth Devils	14	7	0	0	2	0	5	709	569	20
2	Boston Barracuda-Braves	14	6	1	0	2	0	5	713	565	19
3	Redcar Cubs	14	7	0	0	1	1	5	657	614	18
4	Weymouth Wildcats	14	7	0	0	1	0	6	688	588	17
5	Scunthorpe Saints	14	7	0	0	1	0	6	637	629	17
6	Buxton Hitmen	14	6	0	1	1	0	6	605	669	15
7	Rye House Cobras	14	6	0	1	0	0	7	614	663	12
8	Sittingbourne Crusaders	14	1	0	6	0	0	7	472	798	2

== Fixtures & results ==
Home \ Away	BB	BUX	PD	RED	RYE	SCU	SIT	WEY
Boston Barracuda Braves		63–29	64–30	46–46	54–39	60–33	62–25	64–28
Buxton Hitmen	42–47		48–44	52–40	65–26	53–38	61–31	46–44
Plymouth Devils	60–32	63–28		58–34	56–34	58–34	60–31	51–42
Redcar Cubs	46–44	56–32	47–43		56–37	49–43	60–32	53–37
Rye House Cobras	52–40	59–34	42–47	49–40		54–36	54–35	59–34
Scunthorpe Saints	46–43	50–41	51–39	49–39	58–34		62–30	48–45
Sittingbourne Crusaders	35–55	44–46	33–59	36–54	46–44	32–60		31–60
Weymouth Wildcats	54–39	64–28	49–41	56–37	62–31	52–29	61–31	

Legend: Blue = home team win; Yellow = draw; Red = away team win.

== Play-offs ==
Semi-finals
Boston	44	48	92
Redcar	46	45	91
Weymouth	56	44	100
Plymouth	38	46	84

Grand Final
Boston	23	45	68
Weymouth	67	46	113

=== Final ===
25 October	Weymouth Wildcats; Matt Wright 14; Lee Smart 12; Karl Mason 10; Jay Herne 10; Brendan Johnson 8 Andrew Bargh 7 Kyle Newman 6	67–23	Boston Barracuda-Braves; Simon Lambert 7 Darren Rolph 6 Adam Allott 5 Darren Mallett 3 Chris Widman 1 Adam Lowe 0 Rhys Naylor 0	Wessex Stadium

29 October	Boston Barracuda-Braves; Simon Lambert 15; Darren Mallett 11; Adam Allott 7 Rhys Naylor 4 Darren Rolph 3 Adam Lowe 3 Chris Widman 2	45–46	Weymouth Wildcats; Lee Smart 10; Karl Mason 9 Jay Herne 9 Brendan Johnson 8 Andrew Bargh 7 Matt Wright 2 Tim Webster 1	Saddlebow Road

== Conference League Knockout Cup ==
The 2008 Conference League Knockout Cup was the 11th edition of the Knockout Cup for tier three teams. Plymouth Devils were the winners.

First round

Date	Team one	Score	Team two
03/05	Rye House	59-33	Sittingbourne
11/05	Sittingbourne	42-47	Rye House
21/06	Weymouth	47-45	Plymouth
10/07	Plymouth	51-42	Weymouth
08/06	Boston	51-43	Redcar
14/06	Redcar	45-45	Boston
26/05	Scunthorpe	52-41	Buxton
08/06	Buxton	50-41	Scunthorpe

Semi-finals

Date	Team one	Score	Team two
28/09	Boston	56-35	Scunthorpe
10/10	Scunthorpe	45-48	Boston
18/07	Plymouth	57-36	Rye House
10/08	Rye House	56-37	Plymouth

=== Final ===
22 October	Boston Barracuda-Braves	50–39	Plymouth Devils	Saddlebow Road

24 October	Plymouth Devils	59–33	Boston Barracuda-Braves	Plymouth Coliseum

== Conference Trophy ==
Semi final

Team one	Team two	Score
Boston	Buxton	60–34, 41–49
Plymouth	Weymouth	57–35, 45–46

Final

Team one	Team two	Score
Plymouth	Boston	63–28, 31–60

== Riders' Championship ==
Benji Compton won the Riders' Championship. The final was held on 27 September at Rye House Stadium.

Pos.	Rider	Team	Total
1	Benji Compton	Redcar	14
2	Byron Bekker	Scunthorpe	13
3	Darcy Ward	Boston	12
4	Danny Halsey	Rye House	12
5	Jay Herne	Weymouth	12
6	Ben Taylor	Buxton	9
7	Gareth Isherwood	Buxton	7
8	Rob Smith	Rye House	7
9	Dean Felton	Sittingbourne	6
10	Kyle Hughes	Plymouth	6
11	Gary Cottham (res)	Rye House	5
12	Simon Lambert	Boston	4
13	Tom Brown	Plymouth	3
14	Harland Cook (res)	Rye House	3
15	Scott Richardson	Scunthorpe	2
16	Richard Lawson	Redcar	2
17	Aaron Baseby	Sittingbourne	1
18	Kyle Newman	Weymouth	0

== Pairs ==
The Pairs Championship was held at the Wessex Stadium, on 31 May. The event was won by James Cockle and Simon Lambert of the Boston.

Group A
Pos	Team	Pts	Riders
1	Redcar	18	Aaron Summers 12, Scott James 6
2	Sittingbourne	14	Jerran Hart 11, Dean Felton 3
3	Buxton	12	Jack Roberts 7, Ben Taylor 5
4	Weymouth	8	Jay Herne 6, Jon Armstrong 2

Group B
Pos	Team	Pts	Riders
1	Boston	17	James Cockle 12, Simon Lambert 5
2	Scunthorpe	14	Byron Bekker 11, Jon Bethell 3
3	Plymouth	14	Kyle Hughes 10, Paul Starke 4
4	Rye House	7	Gary Cottham 5, Terry Day 2

Semi finals

- Boston bt Sittingbourne
- Redcar bt Scunthorpe

Final

- Boston bt Redcar

== Fours ==
Weymouth won the Conference League Four-Team Championship, held on 18 October 2008 at Loomer Road Stadium.

Group A
Pos	Team	Pts	Riders
1	Redcar	19	James 6, McKinna 6, Cockle 5, Lawson 2
2	Sittingbourne	12	Scarboro 5, Baseby M 3, Baseby A 2, Felton 2
3	Plymouth	9	Starke 4, Pickard 3, Brown 2, Gough 0
4	Boston	7	Lowe 2, Rolph 2, Mallett 2, Allott 1

Group B
Pos	Team	Pts	Riders
1	Weymouth	15	Smart 6, Mason 4, Herne 3, Johnson 2
2	Scunthorpe	13	Hopwood 5, Richardson 4, Irving 2, Parnaby 2
3	Rye House	12	Franklin 4, Smith 3, Aldridge 3, Cottham 2
4	Buxton	7	Isherwood 5, Taylor 2, Whittington 0, Burnett 0

Final
Pos	Team	Pts	Riders
1	Weymouth	13	Smart 6, Herne 3, Johnson 3, Mason 1
2	Redcar	12	Lawson 4, Cockle 3, James 3, McKinna 2
3	Sittingbourne	7	Baseby M 4, Felton 2, Scarboro 1, Baseby A 0
4	Scunthorpe	4	Hopwood 1, Irving 1, Widman 1, Parnaby 1, Richardson 0

== See also ==
List of United Kingdom Speedway League Champions
