= Buxton Raceway =

Motorsport venue in Workington, England

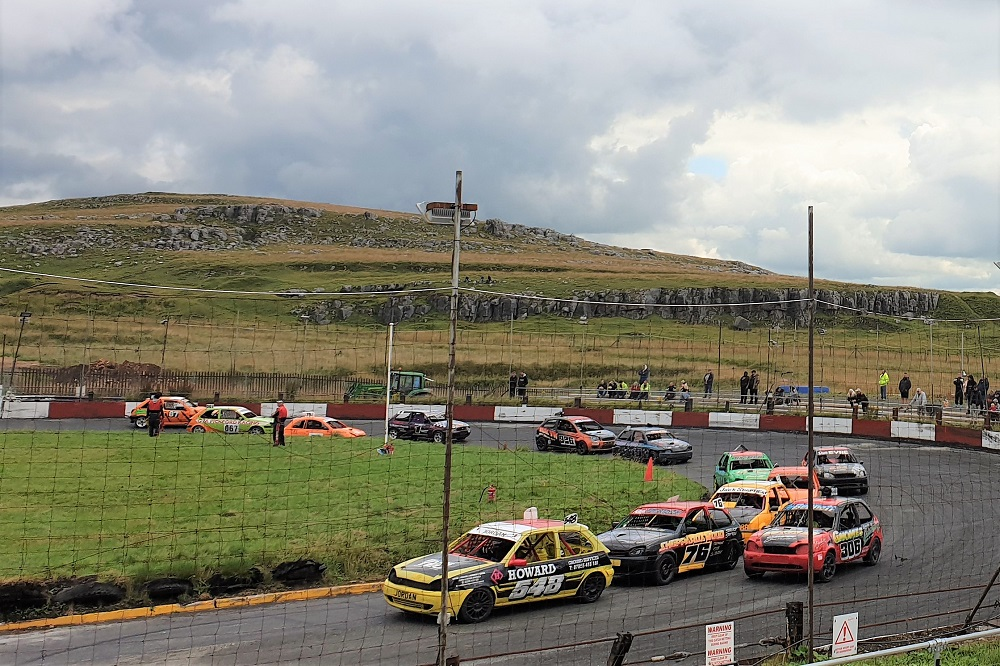
- Location: Dale Head Road, Buxton, Derbyshire, SK17 0RR, England
- Coordinates: 53°13′17″N 1°55′02″W
- Operator: Buxton Raceway Ltd
- Opened: circa.1974

Buxton Raceway is a motorsport venue in Buxton, Derbyshire. It is located in a remote area, three miles south of Buxton, on Dale Head Lane, off the A53 Buxton to Leek Road. The venue is primarily used for BriSCA Formula 1 Stock Cars on the 380 metre tarmac circuit but has also hosted motorcycle speedway on the adjacent Buxton Speedway track.

== History ==
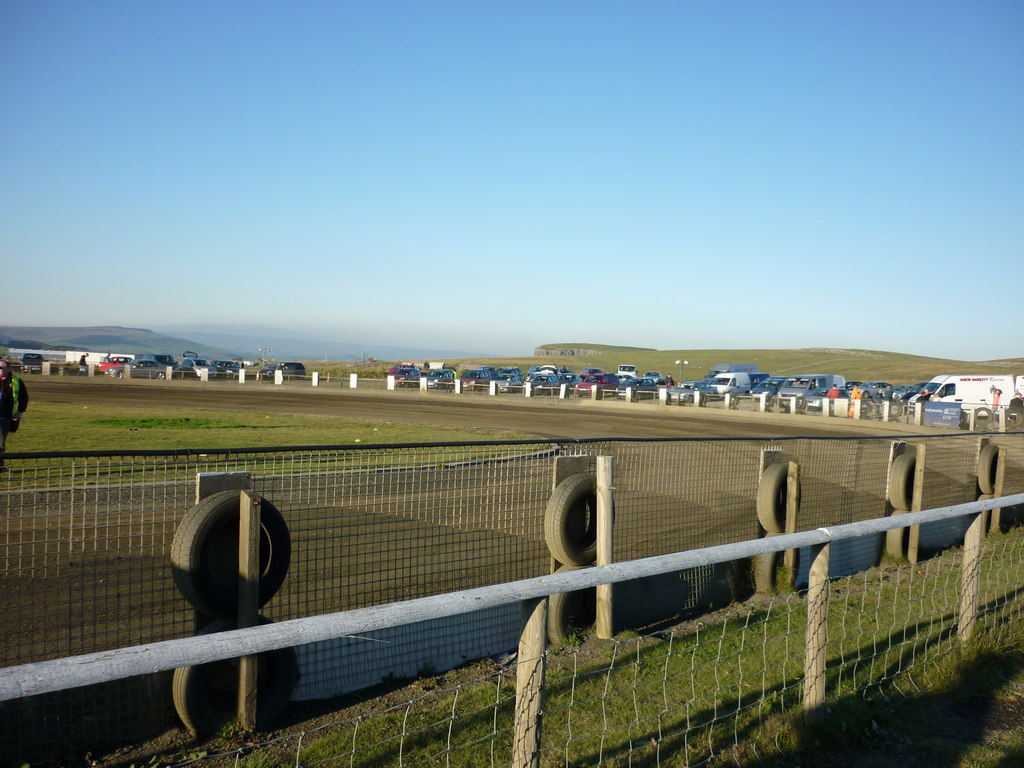
The adjacent speedway track

The site was originally known as High Edge when it was built in circa.1974 and opened shortly afterwards. It had previously been used as a site for rock festivals. It is used for banger and stock car racings as well as drifting events. Regular events are held between April & November each year.

In 1994, a team called Hi-Edge Hitmen began racing on the track. Promoted by Chris Morton and Barry Watson, the team's inaugural season was in the 1994 British League Division Three in which they finished in sixth place.

The team competed for two seasons on the circuit before agreeing with the stock car promotion that a separate speedway track could be built adjacent to the main circuit. The team was then renamed the Buxton Hitmen. The first season on the new track was the 1996 Speedway Conference League. The main Raceway circuit was then converted into a figure eight track.

In 1998, under the promotion of Dave Pierce, the venue changed its name from High Edge to Buxton Raceway.

After the 2018 season, the speedway club chairman Jayne Moss withdrew the club at the National League AGM, following financial struggles. No speedway racing took place at the adjacent track between 2019 and 2025. Speedway returned in 2026 with a team called the Buxton Bulls competing in the National Development League.

== See also ==
- Buxton Hitmen
