= 1997 Speedway Conference League =

British motorcycle speedway season

- League: Conference League (also called Amateur League)
- Champions: Peterborough Thundercats
- Individual: Jon Armstrong
- Division/s above: 1997 Elite League; 1997 Premier League

The 1997 Speedway Conference League (also called the Amateur League), was the third tier/division of British speedway. It reverted to being the third tier because during the previous season it was inadvertently the second-tier competition while the British League ran as a single merged division.

== Summary ==
The title was won by Peterborough Thundercats the junior side belonging to Peterborough Panthers.

The majority of the clubs were the junior sides belonging to their respective senior side or a collaboration ran by their senior sides. The Raven Sprockets were a combination of the Reading Ravens and Swindon Sprockets, the Western Warriors were a combination of the Exeter Falcons and Newport Wasps, the Shuttle Cubs were Wolverhampton Wolves and Long Eaton Speedway and finally the Anglian Angels were the Ipswich Witches and Rye House Rockets.

== Final league table ==
Pos	Team	Played	W	D	L	F	A	Pts
1	Peterborough Thundercats	24	22	1	1	1064	729	45
2	Berwick Border Raiders	24	17	2	5	999	767	36
3	Ryde Wight Wizards	24	15	1	8	987	857	31
4	Buxton Hitmen	24	15	0	9	948	901	30
5	Mildenhall Fen Tigers	24	13	2	9	961	874	28
6	St Austell Gulls	24	13	0	11	963	871	26
7	Raven Sprockets+ (Reading and Swindon)	24	10	3	11	820	848	23
8	Western Warriors+ (Exeter and Newport)	24	10	0	14	909	946	20
9	Oxford Cubs	24	9	0	15	901	909	18
10	Shuttle Cubs+ (Wolverhampton and Long Eaton)	24	9	0	15	799	969	18
11	Lathallan Lightning	24	7	0	17	798	967	14
12	Belle Vue Colts	24	7	0	17	819	1024	14
13	Anglian Angels+ (Ipswich and King's Lynn)	24	4	1	19	725	1031	9

+ combined team

== Fixtures & results ==
Home \ Away	AA	BV	BER	BUX	LL	MIL	OX	PET	RAV	RWW	SA	SC	WW
Anglian Angels		37–41	22–56	40–38	34–43	21–39	36–52	34–44	22–38	37–41	34–44	40–38	42–36
Belle Vue Colts	39–30		33–38	41–37	41–36	26–46	28–25	29–45	26–46	35–42	48–29	36–40	46–32
Berwick Border Raiders	50–28	41–30		47–30	50–28	39–39	52–26	37–41	38–10	49–29	54–24	50–25	54–24
Buxton Hitmen	45–33	53–25	38–39		48–28	44–33	40–36	24–52	36–42	36–41	40–32	46–31	40–37
Lathallan Lightning	44–33	42–36	30–48	38–39		37–40	45–33	32–45	35–42	41–35	35–43	38–37	39–38
Mildenhall Fen Tigers	53–25	40–37	30–47	40–38	41–37		47–30	39–39	52–26	38–40	48–30	47–31	44–34
Oxford Cubs	51–27	52–25	42–36	38–40	48–30	37–41		36–40	45–33	45–32	38–39	37–41	48–30
Peterborough Thundercats	52–26	51–27	50–28	52–26	49–29	51–26	40–35		48–27	43–25	44–34	57–21	45–32
Raven Sprockets	44–34	41–32	27–51	36–40	46–32	40–38	40–38	15–33		34–43	38–40	52–26	44–33
Ryde Wight Wizards	53–25	44–32	43–34	37–41	59–19	48–30	49–28	38–40	39–39		43–35	44–34	49–29
St Austell Gulls	55–21	47–31	58–30	37–41	53–25	40–38	43–11	38–39	44–34	45–33		53–25	34–41
Shuttle Cubs	45–26	26–19	34–37	36–41	39–31	38–35	39–38	26–31	43–32	28–43	50–28		29–48
Western Warriors	38–40	43–35	36–42	30–47	47–25	39–37	36–42	45–33	40–38	41–37	40–38	60–18	

Legend: Blue = home team win; Yellow = draw; Red = away team win.

== Riders' Championship ==
Jon Armstrong won the Riders' Championship. The final was held on 7 September at Long Eaton Stadium.

Pos.	Rider	Team	Total
1	Jon Armstrong	Buxton	13
2	Bobby Eldridge	Ryde	13
3	David Howe	Peterborough	12
4	Blair Scott	Lathallan	11
5	Roger Lobb	Western Warriors	10
6	David Meldrum	Berwick	9
7	Mark Blackwell	Ryde	9
8	Simon Stead	Peterborough	8
9	Dean Garrod	Mildenhall	7
10	Rob Clarence	Shuttle Cubs	6
11	Mark Thompson	Anglian Angels	5
12	Philip Ambrose	Oxford	4
13	Lee Dixon	Belle Vue	4
14	Paul Lee	Shuttle Cubs	3
15	Ian Clarke	Raven Sprockets	3
16	Stephen Read	Buxton	1
17	Nathan McDonald (res)	Shuttle Cubs	0

== See also ==
- List of United Kingdom Speedway League Champions
- Knockout Cup (speedway)
