= Sittingbourne Crusaders =

British speedway team

Club information
- Track address: Iwade Speedway; Old Ferry Road; Iwade; Kent
- Country: England
- Founded: 1971
- Closed: 2008
- League: Conference League

Club facts
- Colours: Blue and Yellow
- Track size: 251 metres

The Sittingbourne Crusaders formerly the Iwade Kent Crusaders were a British speedway team based in Iwade, Kent. England who raced in the Conference League.

== History ==
The Iwade training track was initially built in 1971 by Ivor Thomas and his brother, former Hackney Hawks rider Barry Thomas, whilst he was still a rider for the Canterbury Crusaders, the team whose colours and name Sittingbourne represented.

When the Canterbury Crusaders closed in 1987, the supporters club remained active in attempts to bring back speedway to Kent. In late 1993, they helped improve the Iwade training track to league standards. A team called the Iwade Kent Crusaders were one of four news clubs to enter the 1994 British League Division Three season. They were led by promoter Terry Whibberley who spent over £80,000 in improving the track but at the end of July, Whibberley pulled out due to poor health and put the track up for sale, resulting in the team withdrawing from the league.

The circuit was bought by a consortium that included Graham Arnold and Peter Mason and the team lined up for the 1995 Academy League season, under the new team name of Sittingbourne Crusaders and recorded a respectable fourth place finish. A poor 1996 season then saw the club suffer problems when Swale Council stated that the planning permission given in 1971 was a 25 year temporary agreement. Graham Arnold applied for a lawful development certificate.

Seven years later, during the 2004 Speedway Conference League the team returned, initially only participating in the Knockout Cup but a full season followed in 2005, albeit with a woeful campaign of results. The club missed the 2006 season and finished bottom of the league in 2007 and 2008 before folding.

== Season summary ==
Year and league	Position	Notes
1994 British League Division Three	N/A	Iwade Kent Crusaders, withdrew from league
1995 Academy League	4th	
1996 Speedway Conference League	13th	
2004 Speedway Conference League	N/A	Knockout Cup only
2005 Speedway Conference League	12th	
2007 Speedway Conference League	10th	
2008 Speedway Conference League	8th	
