= 1998 Speedway Conference League =

British motorcycle speedway season

- League: Conference League
- Champions: St Austell Gulls
- Knockout Cup: St Austell Gulls
- Individual: Steve Bishop
- Division/s above: 1998 Elite League; 1998 Premier League

The 1998 Speedway Conference League sponsored by Dunlop, was the third tier/division of British speedway.

== Summary ==
The title was won by St Austell Gulls.

== Final league table ==
Pos	Team	Played	W	D	L	F	A	Pts
1	St Austell Gulls	16	13	1	2	844	562	27
2	Newport Mavericks	16	10	0	6	742	682	20
3	Mildenhall Fen Tigers	16	8	1	7	704	709	17
4	Norfolk Braves	16	6	0	10	690	739	12
5	Buxton Hitmen	16	2	0	14	573	861	4
6	Skegness Braves+	4	1	0	3	166	191	2

+ withdrew - Norfolk replaced Skegness and took over fixtures

== Fixtures & results ==
A Fixtures

Home \ Away	BUX	MIL	NEW	NOR	SA
Buxton Hitmen		40–50	29–61	30–60	36–53
Mildenhall Fen Tigers	63–27		42–47	44–46	55–35
Newport Mavericks	62–28	54–36		53–36	53–33
Norfolk Braves	54–36	51–38	56–33		38–51
St Austell Gulls	61–29	51–38	57–32	57–32	

Legend: Blue = home team win; Yellow = draw; Red = away team win.

B Fixtures

Home \ Away	BUX	MIL	NEW	NOR	SA
Buxton Hitmen		44–46	48–41	50–40	36–53
Mildenhall Fen Tigers	49–41		51–39	45–44	45–45
Newport Mavericks	58–30	56–34		51–35	35–54
Norfolk Braves	55–34	42–48	43–47		39–51
St Austell Gulls	55–35	46–20	70–20	71–19	

Legend: Blue = home team win; Yellow = draw; Red = away team win.

== Conference League Knockout Cup ==
The 1998 Conference league Knockout Cup (sponsored by Dunlop) was the first edition of the Knockout Cup for tier three teams.

In 1995 there had been an Academy League Knockout Cup and in 1996 a Conference League Knockout Cup but due to a merger of the British Leagues, both the 1995 and 1996 editions acted as the second tier of British speedway at the time.

First round

Date	Team one	Score	Team two
21/06	Skegness	41-49	Mildenhall
21/06	Mildenhall	48-41	Skegness

Semi-finals

Date	Team one	Score	Team two
30/08	Buxton	43-47	Mildenhall
19/07	Mildenhall	49-41	Buxton
17/07	Newport	52-38	St Austell
14/07	St Austell	59-31	Newport

=== Final ===
22 September

St Austell Gulls; Steve Bishop 17; Seemond Stephens 14; Roger Lobb 12; Garry Lobb	53–36	Mildenhall Fen Tigers; David Mason 13; Ross Brady 8 Geoff Powell 5 Dean Garrod; Jamie Barton	Clay Country Moto Parc

3 October

Mildenhall Fen Tigers; Geoff Powell 12; Ross Brady 9	38–52	St Austell Gulls; Seemond Stephens 15; James Birkinshaw 13; Steve Bishop 10	Mildenhall Stadium

== Riders' Championship ==
Steve Bishop won the Riders' Championship. The final was held on 12 July at the Clay Country Moto Parc in St Austell.

Pos.	Rider	Team	Total
1	Steve Bishop	St. Austell	15
2	Andrew Appleton	Newport	14
3	Seemond Stephens	St. Austell	12
4	Adrian Newman	St. Austell	11
5	Peter Boast	Norfolk	10
6	Wayne Barrett	St. Austell	10
7	Roger Lobb	Newport	9
8	Dean Garrod	Mildenhall	8
9	Jason Prynne	St. Austell	8
10	Chris Neath	Newport	7
11	Paul Lydes Uings	Mildenhall	4
12	Richard Ford	Newport	4
13	Kevin Phillips	St. Austell	3
14	Paul Macklin	Buxton	3
15	Martin Williams	Newport	1
16	Chris Harris	St. Austell	1
17	Vince Purnell (res)		0

== See also ==
- List of United Kingdom Speedway League Champions
- Knockout Cup (speedway)
