= List of United Kingdom speedway league champions =

Speedway competition

The List of United Kingdom Speedway League Champions is split into three divisions, the top tier, the second tier and third tier, all three divisions have been known in various guises such as National League, Premier League, Elite League and many more. This list gives a complete listing of the divisional winners for each season.

During some years there was only one or two divisions.

Belle Vue hold the most tier one championships with 15 followed by Poole and Wembley with 10.

== Tier One league (top division) ==
Season	Champions
1929	Stamford Bridge Pensioners
1929	Leeds Lions
1930	Wembley Lions
1930	Belle Vue Aces
1931	Wembley Lions
1931	Belle Vue Aces
1932	Wembley Lions
1933	Belle Vue Aces
1934	Belle Vue Aces
1935	Belle Vue Aces
1936	Belle Vue Aces
1937	West Ham Hammers
1938	New Cross Rangers
1946	Wembley Lions
1947	Wembley Lions
1948	New Cross Rangers
1949	Wembley Lions
1950	Wembley Lions
1951	Wembley Lions
1952	Wembley Lions
1953	Wembley Lions
1954	Wimbledon Dons
1955	Wimbledon Dons
1956	Wimbledon Dons
1957	Swindon Robins
1958	Wimbledon Dons
1959	Wimbledon Dons
1960	Wimbledon Dons
1961	Wimbledon Dons
1962	Southampton Saints
1963	Belle Vue Aces
1964	Oxford Cheetahs
1965	West Ham Hammers
1966	Halifax Dukes
1967	Swindon Robins
1968	Coventry Bees
1969	Poole Pirates
1970	Belle Vue Aces
1971	Belle Vue Aces
1972	Belle Vue Aces
1973	Reading Racers
1974	Exeter Falcons
1975	Ipswich Witches
1976	Ipswich Witches
1977	White City Rebels
1978	Coventry Bees
1979	Coventry Bees

Season	Champions
1980	Reading Racers
1981	Cradley Heath
1982	Belle Vue Aces
1983	Cradley Heath
1984	Ipswich Witches
1985	Oxford Cheetahs
1986	Oxford Cheetahs
1987	Coventry Bees
1988	Coventry Bees
1989	Oxford Cheetahs
1990	Reading Racers
1991	Wolverhampton Wolves
1992	Reading Racers
1993	Belle Vue Aces
1994	Poole Pirates
1995	Eastbourne Eagles
1996	Wolverhampton Wolves
1997	Bradford Dukes
1998	Ipswich Witches
1999	Peterborough Panthers
2000	Eastbourne Eagles
2001	Oxford Cheetahs
2002	Wolverhampton Wolves
2003	Poole Pirates
2004	Poole Pirates
2005	Coventry Bees
2006	Peterborough Panthers
2007	Coventry Bees
2008	Poole Pirates
2009	Wolverhampton Wolves
2010	Coventry Bees
2011	Poole Pirates
2012	Swindon Robins
2013	Poole Pirates
2014	Poole Pirates
2015	Poole Pirates
2016	Wolverhampton Wolves
2017	Swindon Robins
2018	Poole Pirates
2019	Swindon Robins
2021	Peterborough Panthers
2022	Belle Vue Aces
2023	Sheffield Tigers
2024	Belle Vue Aces
2025	Ipswich Witches
2026	Belle Vue Aces

Most Tier One titles

Name	Titles
Belle Vue Aces	15
Poole Pirates	10
Wembley Lions	10
Coventry Bees	8
Wimbledon Dons	7
Ipswich Witches	5
Oxford Cheetahs	5
Swindon Robins	5
Wolverhampton Wolves	5

== Tier Two league (second division) ==
Season	Champions
1934	West Ham Reserves
1936	Southampton Saints
1937	Bristol Bulldogs
1938	Hackney Wick Wolves
1946	Middlesbrough Bears
1947	Middlesbrough Bears
1948	Bristol Bulldogs
1949	Bristol Bulldogs
1950	Norwich Stars
1951	Norwich Stars
1952	Poole Pirates
1953	Coventry Bees
1954	Bristol Bulldogs
1955	Poole Pirates
1956	Swindon Robins
1957	Southern Rovers
1959	Eastbourne Eagles
1960	Rayleigh Rockets
1961	Poole Pirates
1962	Poole Pirates
1963	Wolverhampton Wolves
1964	Newcastle Diamonds
1968	Belle Vue Colts
1969	Belle Vue Colts
1970	Canterbury Crusaders
1971	Eastbourne Eagles
1972	Crewe Kings
1973	Boston Barracudas
1974	Birmingham Brummies
1975	Birmingham Brummies
1976	Newcastle Diamonds
1977	Eastbourne Eagles
1978	Canterbury Crusaders
1979	Mildenhall Fen Tigers
1980	Rye House Rockets
1981	Middlesbrough Tigers
1982	Newcastle Diamonds
1983	Newcastle Diamonds
1984	Long Eaton Invaders
1985	Ellesmere Port Gunners

Season	Champions
1986	Eastbourne Eagles
1987	Eastbourne Eagles
1988	Hackney Kestrels
1989	Poole Pirates
1990	Poole Pirates
1991	Arena Essex Hammers
1992	Peterborough Panthers
1993	Glasgow Tigers
1994	Glasgow Tigers
1995	Berwick Bandits
1996	Linlithgow Lightning
1997	Reading Racers
1998	Peterborough Panthers
1999	Sheffield Tigers
2000	Exeter Falcons
2001	Newcastle Diamonds
2002	Sheffield Tigers
2003	Edinburgh Monarchs
2004	Hull Vikings
2005	Rye House Rockets
2006	Kings Lynn Stars
2007	Rye House Rockets
2008	Edinburgh Monarchs
2009	Edinburgh Monarchs
2010	Newcastle Diamonds
2011	Glasgow Tigers
2012	Scunthorpe Scorpions
2013	Somerset Rebels
2014	Edinburgh Monarchs
2015	Edinburgh Monarchs
2016	Somerset Rebels
2017	Sheffield Tigers
2018	Workington Comets
2019	Leicester Lions
2021	Poole Pirates
2022	Poole Pirates
2023	Glasgow Tigers
2024	Poole Pirates
2025	Poole Pirates
2026	Poole Pirates

== Tier Three league (third division) ==
Season	Champions
1947	Eastbourne Eagles
1948	Exeter Falcons
1949	Hanley Potters
1950	Oxford Cheetahs
1951	Poole Pirates
1952	Rayleigh Rockets
1953	Rayleigh Rockets
1954	California Poppies
1955	Rye House Roosters
1956	Rye House Roosters
1994	Berwick Bandits
1997	Peterborough Pumas
1998	St Austell Gulls
1999	Newport Mavericks
2000	Sheffield Prowlers
2001	Sheffield Prowlers
2002	Peterborough Pumas
2003	Mildenhall Fen Tigers
2004	Mildenhall Fen Tigers
2005	Oxford Silver Machine Academy

Season	Champions
2006	Scunthorpe Scorpions
2007	Scunthorpe Scorpions
2008	Weymouth Wildcats
2009	Bournemouth Buccaneers
2010	Buxton Hitmen
2011	Scunthorpe & Sheffield Saints
2012	Mildenhall Fen Tigers
2013	Dudley Heathens
2014	Cradley Heathens
2015	Birmingham Brummies
2016	Birmingham Brummies
2017	Belle Vue Colts
2018	Eastbourne Eagles
2019	Leicester Lion Cubs
2021	Mildenhall Fen Tigers
2022	Leicester Lion Cubs
2023	Oxford Chargers
2024	Leicester Lion Cubs
2025	Oxford Chargers
2026	Edinburgh Academy
