= Scott Pegler =

English speedway rider (born 1973)

- Born: 3 August 1973 (age 53); Exeter, England
- Nationality: British (English)

Career history
- 1989–1995: Exeter Falcons
- 1996: Swindon Robins
- 1997–1999: Newport Wasps
- 1998, 2000–2005: Newport Mavericks
- 2003: Poole Pirates

Individual honours
- 2000: National League Riders' Champion

Scott Andrew Pegler (born 3 August 1973) is a former motorcycle speedwayrider

== Career ==
Pegler started racing in the British leagues during the 1989 National League season, when riding for the Exeter Falcons, where he famously coined the term "right there right there". He struggled to establish himself in the team over the following seasons and it was not until the 1994 season that he was a regular in the Exeter team.

Pegler rode in the top tier of British speedway during the 1995 Premier League speedway season, again for Exeter. After spending the following season in 1996 with Swindon Robins he signed for Newport Wasps. It was with the Welsh club that he would experience his best speedway years. Also in 1996 he rode for and topped the team averages for Swindon Sprockets during the 1996 Speedway Conference League. At Newport in 1999, he temporarily captained the Wasps in Frank Smart's absence.

From 2000 to 2005, Pegler rode for the Newport Mavericks and in 2000, Pegler won the Conference League Riders' Championship. The final was held on 9 September at Hayley Stadium. The following season in 2001, he finished runner-up to David Mason in the same Championship.
