= Buxton Speedway =

Defunct speedway team in England

Buxton Bulls

Club information
- Track address: Buxton Raceway; Dale Head Lane; Axe Edge; Buxton; Derbyshire
- Country: England
- Founded: 1994
- Closed: 2018
- League: National League
- Website: www.buxton-speedway.com

Club facts
- Colours: Gold, Red and Black
- Track size: 240 metres
- Track record time: 52.9
- Track record date: 27 June 2004
- Track record holder: James Wright

Current team
Rider	CMA
(England) Jack Smith (capt)
(England) Jamie Etherington
(England) Alfie Bowtell
(England) Arran Butcher
(England) Luke Harris
(England) Jack Shimelt

Major team honours
National League KO Cup	2002, 2010
National League	2010
National Trophy	2010

Buxton Speedway (currently Buxton Bulls and formerly Buxton Hitmen) are a motorcycle speedway team that returned to racing in 2026 in the British National Development League. The club previously raced in the Conference League from 1994 to 2018.

== History ==
=== Origins and 1990s ===
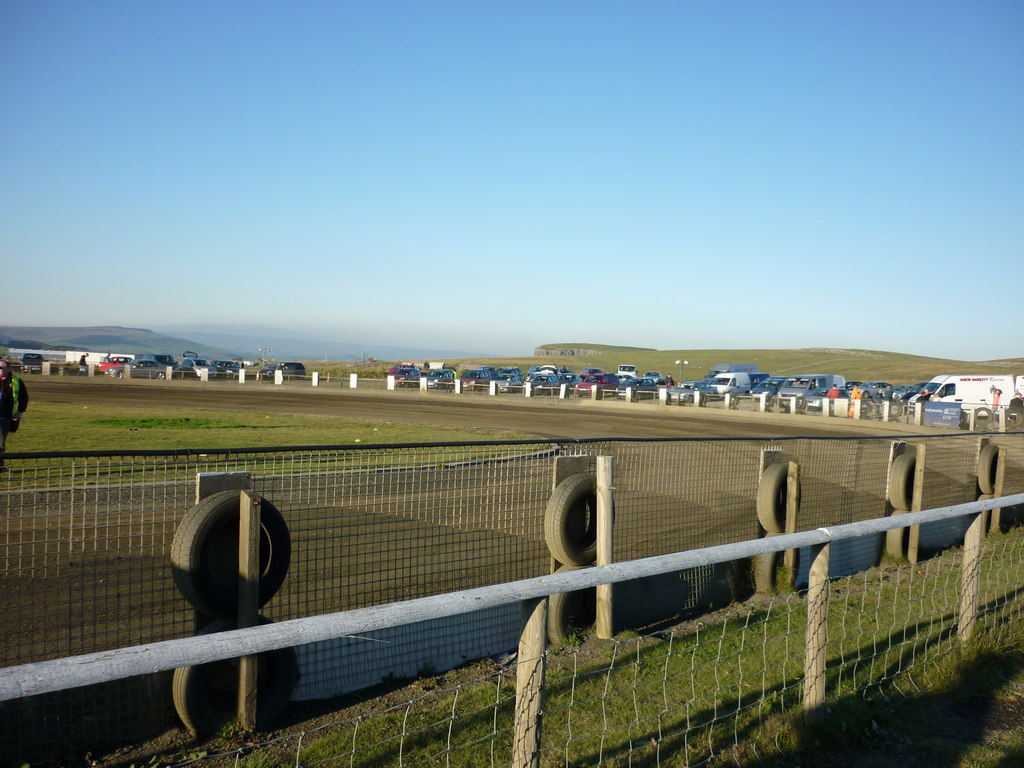
The speedway track, adjacent to the Raceway

In 1994, a team called Hi-Edge Hitmen began racing on the Buxton Raceway. Promoted by Barry Watson and former England rider Chris Morton, the team's inaugural season was in the 1994 British League Division Three in which they finished in sixth place. The following year they finished third in the 1995 Academy League before joining the Conference League (division 3).

The speedway promotion agreed with the stock car promotion that a separate speedway track could be built adjacent to the main circuit. The team was then renamed the Buxton Hitmen from the 1996 Speedway Conference League season. The first season on the new track in 1996 ended with an eighth-place finish.

Two Buxton riders, Mike Hampson and Jon Armstrong won consecutive Riders' Championships in 1996 and 1997 respectively.

=== 2000s ===
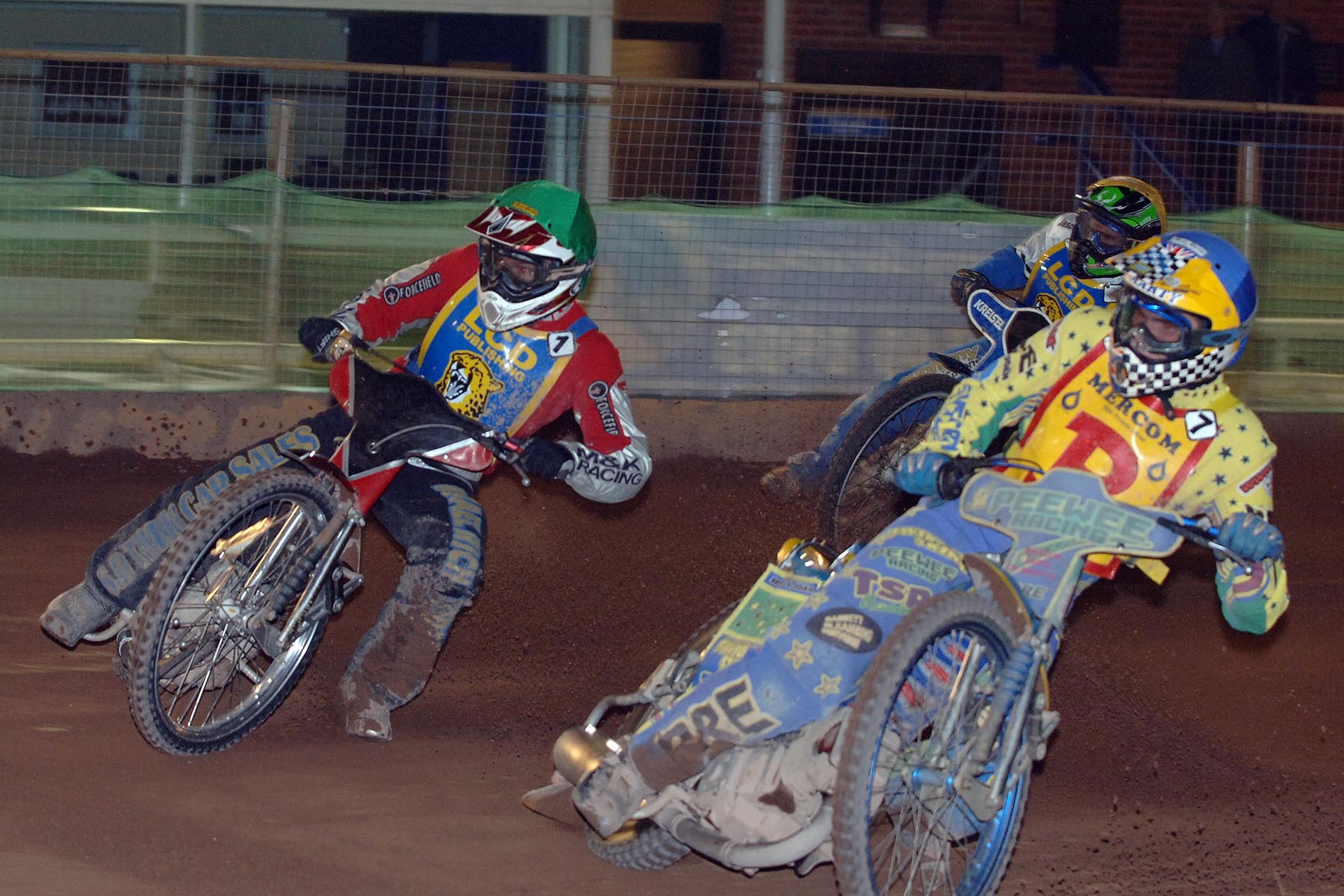
Buxton against Oxford in 2007

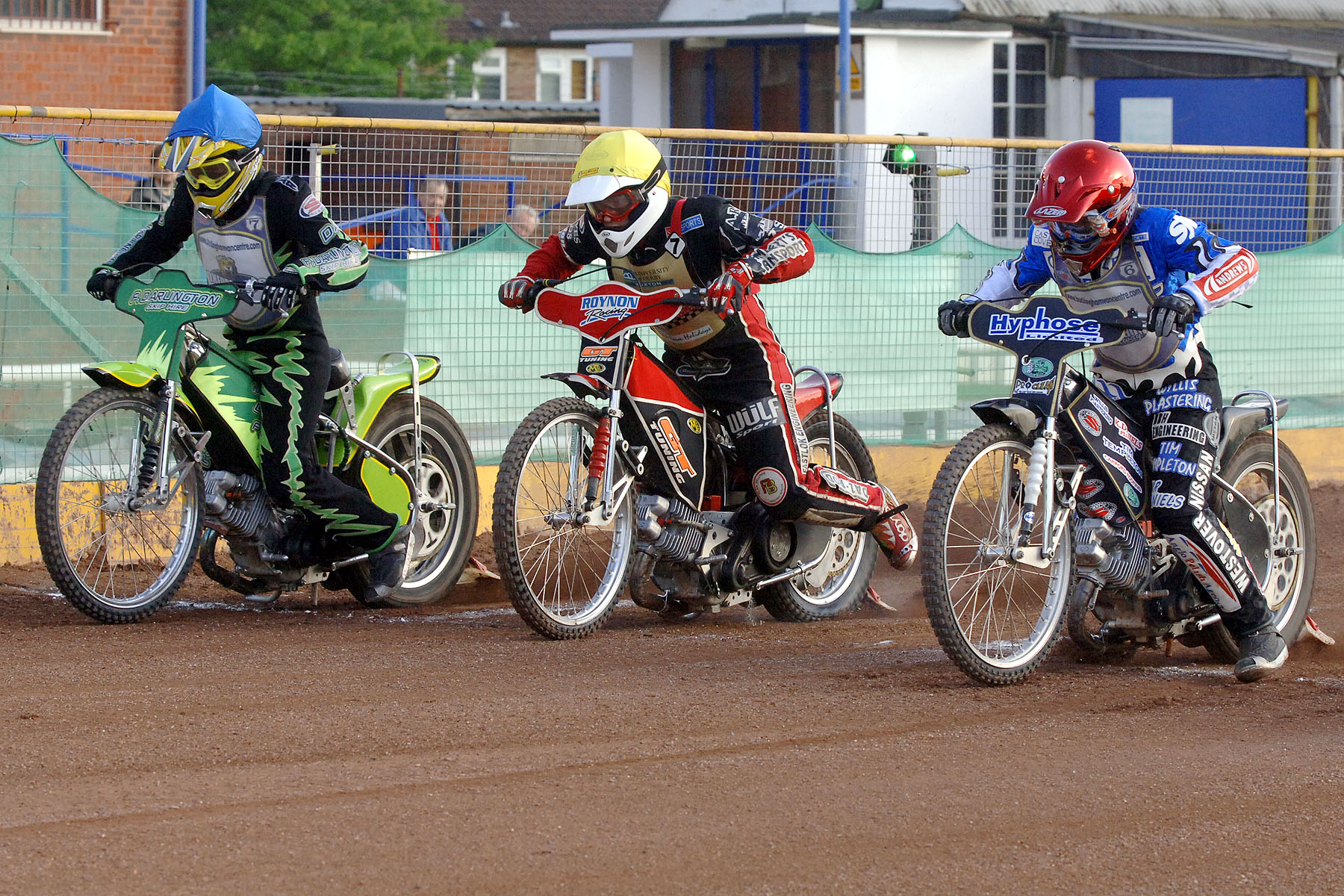
Buxton versus Oxford in 2007

During the 2002 Speedway Conference League season the team won their first silverware when winning the Conference League Knockout Cup. They comfortably defeated the Rye House Raiders 99–81 on aggregate in the final, with William Beveridge scoring a 15-point home leg maximum and Aidan Collins scoring 17 in the away leg.

The remainder of the decade was spent in mid-table positions, with the highlight being the Riders' Championship successes by James Wright in 2004 Adam Roynon in 2006 and Craig Cook in 2009.

=== 2010s ===
Their best season was 2010, when they achieved the treble. After finishing second in the regular season table behind Dudley Heathens during the 2010 National League speedway season they won the playoffs, defeating Newport Wasps in the final. They also won the Knockout Cup and National Trophy. The treble winning team included riders such as Craig Cook, Nick Morris, Robert Branford and Jason Garrity.

The Hitmen struggled to compete in the league in the following years, finishing last in 2016 and enduring a disastrous campaign during 2018. After the 2018 season, the speedway club chairman Jayne Moss withdrew the club at the National League AGM, following financial struggles. The speedway team has not raced since. In the 25 years that the team raced they always competed in the third division.

The team under the name Buxton Bulls, returned to compete in the 2026 National Development League.

== Honours ==
- Conference Knockout Cup 2002
- National League Champions 2010
- National League Knockout Cup 2010
- National Trophy 2010

== Season summary ==
Extended content

Year and league	Position	Notes
1994 British League Division Three	6th	As the Hi-Edge Hitmen
1995 Academy League	3rd	As the Hi-Edge Hitmen
1996 Speedway Conference League	8th	
1997 Speedway Conference League	4th	
1998 Speedway Conference League	5th	
1999 Speedway Conference League	3rd	
2000 Speedway Conference League	8th	
2001 Speedway Conference League	6th	
2002 Speedway Conference League	5th	Knockout Cup winners
2003 Speedway Conference League	6th	
2004 Speedway Conference League	6th	
2005 Speedway Conference League	11th	
2006 Speedway Conference League	6th	
2007 Speedway Conference League	7th	
2008 Speedway Conference League	6th	
2009 National League speedway season	4th	
2010 National League speedway season	2nd	Champions (PO winners) & Knockout Cup winners
2011 National League speedway season	8th	
2012 National League speedway season	7th	
2013 National League speedway season	6th	
2014 National League speedway season	8th	
2015 National League speedway season	8th	
2016 National League speedway season	12th	
2017 National League speedway season	10th	
2018 National League speedway season	10th	

== Notable riders ==
- (England) Jon Armstrong
- (England) Craig Cook
- (England) Mike Hampson
- (England) Adam Roynon
- (England) Charles Wright
- (England) James Wright

== See also ==
- Category:Buxton Hitmen riders
