= Steve Bishop (speedway rider) =

English speedway rider

- Born: 26 November 1963 (age 62); Bristol, England
- Nationality: British (English)

Career history
- 1981: Canterbury Crusaders
- 1981–1983, 1999: Swindon Robins
- 1982–1986, 1989–1990: Exeter Falcons
- 1984: Stoke Potters
- 1987: Arena Essex Hammers
- 1988: Poole Pirates
- 1988–1989: Long Eaton Invaders
- 1998: St Austell Gulls
- 2002–2004: Somerset Rebels

Individual honours
- 1998: Conference League Riders' Champion

Team honours
- 1983: National League KO Cup Winner

Steve Bishop (born 26 November 1963) is a former grasstrack, longtrack and motorcycle speedway rider from England.

== Career ==
Bishop started racing in the British leagues in 1981 but it was not during the 1982 National League season that he became a regular rider, when riding for the Exeter Falcons. He helped Exeter win the Knockout Cup in 1983 and rode for them when they were in the top division in 1984. Also in 1984, he doubled up for Stoke Potters.

Following a season with Arena Essex Hammers in 1987, Bishop rode for Poole Pirates and Long Eaton Invaders in 1988. He returned to Exeter for the 1989 and 1990 seasons before he began to concentrate on grasstrack and longtrack racing. As a longtrack rider, he reached the final of the European Championship and the final of the 1995 Individual Long Track World Championship. As a grasstrack rider, he won the 1998 British Best Pairs.

Bishop returned to conventional speedway in 1998, riding for St Austell Gulls and became the Conference League Riders' Champion. The final was held on 12 July at the Clay Country Moto Parc in St Austell.

Bishop rode for the Swindon Robins in 1999 and finished his career with Somerset Rebels from 2002 to 2004.
