= 1994 British League Division Three =

British motorcycle speedway season

- League: British League
- Season: 1994
- Champions: Berwick Bandits
- Individual: Andy Howe
- Division/s above: British League (Div 1); British League (Div 2)

The 1994 British League Division Three was the third tier/division of British speedway. It was also the final season of the British League before a restructure of the sport.

== Summary ==
Four new teams entered the league; the first was Cleveland Bays, who shared Cleveland Park Stadium with division 2 parent club Middlesbrough Bears. The second was the Hi-Edge Hitmen, co-promoted by former England rider Chris Morton and based at Buxton Raceway. The other two teams were teams that would race on tracks that were formerly training circuits; Scottish team Linlithgow Lightning based at Heathersfield Stadium, and Iwade Kent Crusaders, who would later withdraw from the league at the end of July.

The title was won by Berwick Bandits.

== Final league table ==
| Pos | Team | Played | W | D | L | F | A | Pts | Bonus | Total |
|---|---|---|---|---|---|---|---|---|---|---|
| 1 | Berwick Bandits | 10 | 7 | 1 | 2 | 443 | 329 | 15 | 5 | 20 |
| 2 | Cleveland Bays | 10 | 6 | 1 | 3 | 420 | 356 | 13 | 3 | 16 |
| 3 | Stoke Potters | 10 | 6 | 0 | 4 | 389 | 379 | 12 | 3 | 15 |
| 4 | Linlithgow Lightning | 10 | 4 | 0 | 6 | 390 | 386 | 8 | 3 | 11 |
| 5 | Mildenhall Fen Tigers | 10 | 4 | 0 | 6 | 350 | 419 | 8 | 1 | 9 |
| 6 | Hi-Edge Hitmen | 10 | 2 | 0 | 8 | 324 | 447 | 4 | 0 | 4 |

Iwade Kent Crusaders withdrew.

== Fixtures & results ==
| Home \ Away | CB | BER | HI | LL | MIL | STO |
|---|---|---|---|---|---|---|
| Cleveland Bays | | 39–39 | 50–26 | 44–34 | 48–30 | 53–25 |
| Berwick Bandits | 47–30 | | 60–18 | 54–24 | 48–27 | 43–33 |
| Hi-Edge Hitmen | 32–46 | 45–33 | | 39–38 | 36–41 | 36–41 |
| Linlithgow Lightning | 45–33 | 36–41 | 51–27 | | 52–26 | 43–34 |
| Mildenhall Fen Tigers | 41–37 | 37–41 | 46–29 | 40–38 | | 37–39 |
| Stoke Potters | 37–40 | 40–37 | 41–36 | 48–29 | 51–25 | |

Legend: Blue = home team win; Yellow = draw; Red = away team win.

== Riders' Championship ==
Andy Howe won the Riders' Championship. The final was held on 1 October at Long Eaton Stadium.

| Pos. | Rider | Team | Total |
|---|---|---|---|
| 1 | Andy Howe | Cleveland | 14 |
| 2 | Kevin Little | Berwick | 13 |
| 3 | Colin Earl | Cleveland | 12 |
| 4 | Ade Hoole | Stoke | 10 |
| 5 | Anthony Barlow | Berwick | 10 |
| 6 | Stuart Coleman | Linlithgow | 9 |
| 7 | Michael Lowrie | Berwick | 9 |
| 8 | Andre Compton | Buxton (Hi-Edge) | 9 |
| 9 | Craig Taylor | Berwick | 7 |
| 10 | Paul Gould | Cleveland | 6 |
| 11 | Martin Cobbin | Mildenhall | 5 |
| 12 | Peter Johnson | Cleveland | 5 |
| 13 | Gary Sweet | Mildenhall | 3 |
| 14 | Dean Felton | Buxton (Hi-Edge) | 3 |
| 15 | Grant Blackie | Linlithgow | 2 |
| 16 | Sean Naylor | Buxton (Hi-Edge) | 1 |
| 17 | Simon Wolstenholme | Mildenhall | 0 |

== Teams and averages ==
Berwick

- Glyn Taylor 9.79
- David Nagel 8.50
- Michael Lowrie 8.50
- William Beveridge 8.27
- Anthony Barlow 8.20
- Kevin Little 8.13
- Gareth Martin 7.66
- David Meldrum 2.67

Buxton (Hi-Edge)

- Dean Felton 7.71
- Richard Webb 6.42
- Lee Dicken 6.13
- Jamie Isherwood 4.84
- Scott Donovan 4.48
- Carl Checketts 4.44
- Shawn Venables 4.36
- Sean Naylor 3.50
- Steve Mitchell 1.60
- Steve Crockett 1.14

Cleveland

- Colin Earl 10.31
- Jason Handley 9.67
- Andy Howe 8.28
- Peter Johnson 7.20
- Jonathan Swales 6.38
- Brian Turner 4.36
- Tony Howe 3.87

Iwade (withdrew from league)

- Kevin Teager 7.20
- Jason Green 5.33
- Dean Chapman 5.00
- Mark Fordham 4.00
- Nathan Gaymer 4.00
- David Mason 3.20

Linlithgow

- Geoff Powell 9.40
- Paul Gould 8.72
- Peter Scully 6.50
- Brian Mercer 6.33
- Grant Blackie 6.22
- Stuart Coleman 5.45
- Neil Hewitt 5.21
- Paul Taylor 2.92

Mildenhall

- Simon Wolstenholme 9.03
- Gary Sweet 6.98
- Peter Boast 6.00
- Martin Cobbin 5.84
- Dean Garrod 5.82
- Steve Battle 5.18
- Tony Kingsbury 5.09
- Carl Johnson 4.69
- Sid Cooper 2.75

Stoke

- Chris Cobby 10.40
- Andre Compton 8.13
- Craig Taylor 7.41
- Ade Hoole 7.35
- Colin Thorpe 6.88
- Gary O'Hare 5.85
- Scott Kirton 5.14
- Rob Horner 5.09
- Paul Macklin 2.75
- Drew Wheeldon 2.74

== See also ==
- List of United Kingdom Speedway League Champions
- Knockout Cup (speedway)
