= Steve Boxall =

British speedway rider

- Born: 16 May 1987 (age 39); Canterbury, England
- Nationality: British (English)

Career history
- 2002-2005: Rye House Raiders
- 2004-2007, 2011, 2014-2015: Rye House Rockets
- 2007, 2009: Poole Pirates
- 2008-2010: Belle Vue Aces
- 2009: Newcastle Diamonds
- 2010: Somerset Rebels
- 2013, 2018: Kent Kings
- 2015: Lakeside Hammers
- 2016-2017: Plymouth Devils
- 2023: Berwick Bandits/Bullets

Individual honours
- 2005: Conference League Riders' Champion
- 2013: National League Riders' Champion

Team honours
- 2005, 2007: Premier League Champion
- 2005: Premier Trophy Winner
- 2003: Conference League Fours Winner

Steven Shane Boxall (born 16 May 1987 in Canterbury, Kent) is a motorcycle speedway rider. He rode with the Belle Vue Aces in the Elite League, and currently rides for the Berwick Bullets in the National Development League.

== Career ==
Boxall rode for Rye House Raiders in the Conference League and in 2005 won the Riders' Championship. The final was held on 27 August at Rye House Stadium.

Also in 2005, Boxall won the Premier League Championship with the Rye House Rockets, and he did so again in 2007.

In 2013, eight years after his first success, Boxall won the Riders' Championship for the second time.

In 2018, Boxall was banned from speedway for two years after being selected for a random drugs and alcohol test in a meeting between Kent and Plymouth at Central Park Stadium on Monday 6 August. He refused to take the test and left the circuit. As a result, he was handed a two-year ban by the Speedway Control Bureau. Boxall subsequently retired from speedway after being handed the two-year ban.

Boxall returned to the sport five years later in 2023. After impressing during practice runs on the Isle of Wight, he signed for the Berwick Bullets in the National Development League and then in August came into the Berwick main team as an injury replacement.
