= Kevin Little (speedway rider) =

British speedway rider

- Born: 24 September 1972 (age 54); Edinburgh, Scotland
- Nationality: British (Scottish)

Career history
- 1989–1991, 1994–1995, 1997: Berwick Bandits
- 1992: Bradford Dukes
- 1993–1995, 1998–2000: Edinburgh Monarchs
- 1995: Belle Vue Aces
- 1996: Coventry Bees
- 2001–2004: Newcastle Diamonds
- 2005: Workington Comets
- 2006: Redcar Bears

Individual honours
- 1995: Academy League Riders' Championship

Team honours
- 1994: British League Div 3
- 1999: Knockout Cup
- 2001: Premier League (Div 2)

Kevin John Little (born 24 September 1972) is a former motorcycle speedway rider from Scotland.

Married to Alice Little in September 2016, the couple have two children.

== Career ==
Little started racing in the British leagues during the 1989 National League season, when riding for the Berwick Bandits. He remained with the club the following two seasons in 1990 and 1991 before joining Bradford Dukes in the top tier of British speedway. He helped Bradford win the Knockout Cup but did not ride in the final.

In 1993, Little joined Edinburgh Monarchs and enjoyed a good season improving his average to 6.29. He rode again for Edinburgh in 1994, in addition to Belle Vue Aces in the top league and Berwick in division 3. During the 1994 British League Division Three season, he won the league title with Berwick and finished runner-up to Andy Howe in the British League Division Three Riders' Championship.

The following season in 1995, Little achieved his greatest individual success (with Berwick) winning the Academy League Riders' Championship. In 1996, he joined Coventry Bees in the Premier League before returning to Berwick in 1997. He achieved excellent averages of 7.95 and 7.84 for Edinburgh in 1998 and 1999 respectively. He won the Knockout Cup with Edinburgh in 1999, scoring 15 points in the two leg final. After a final season with Edinburgh in 2000, he signed for the Newcastle Diamonds and rode for them for four years. During his time at Newcastle he won the Premier League (div 2) in 2001.

Little's last two seasons in speedway as a rider were for Workington Comets in 2005 and Redcar Bears in 2006.

In 2023, Little was the manager of the Berwick development team.
