= Mike Hampson =

British speedway rider

- Born: 26 July 1973 (age 53); Ashton-under-Lyne, Greater Manchester, England
- Nationality: British (English)

Career history
- 1990–1992: Belle Vue Aces
- 1993–1995: Long Eaton Invaders
- 1995, 1997: Sheffield Tigers
- 1995–1997: Buxton Hitmen
- 1996: Hull Vikings

Individual honours
- 1996: NL Riders' champion

Michael John Hampson (born 26 July 1973) is a former motorcycle speedway rider from England.

== Biography ==
Hampson, born in Ashton-under-Lyne, began his British leagues career riding for Belle Vue Aces during the 1990 British League season after being called up following team injury problems at the Manchester club. He continued to ride for the Belle Vue Colts in 1991 and 1992, becoming their captain in the process.

In 1993, Hampson secured a loan deal to ride for Long Eaton Invaders, where he impressed, posting a 5.68 average in his first season with them.

After racing for the Invaders during 1994, Hampson signed for the 1995 season but switched to join the Sheffield Tigers when the opportunity to ride in the highest division (the 1995 Premier League speedway season) surfaced. It was also in 1995 that he joined Buxton Hitmen in the 1995 Academy League.

The following season in 1996, Hampson won his most significant honour by claiming the National League Riders' Championship as a Buxton rider. He also doubled up with Hull Vikings for the 1996 Premier League speedway season.

Hampson rode for Sheffield Tigers and Buxton in 1997. He suffered a serious hand injury which contributed to his early retirement from speedway.
