= Linlithgow Lightning =

Defunct British motorcycle speedway team

Club information
- Track address: Heathersfield Stadium; Myrehead Farm; Whitecross; Linlithgow; West Lothian
- Country: Scotland
- Founded: 1994
- Closed: 1999

Major team honours
Conference champions	1996
Knockout Cup winners (tier 3)	1996

Linlithgow Lightning were a British speedway team based in Linlithgow, West Lothian, Scotland. They raced at Heathersfield Stadium.

== History ==
Plans for holding speedway in Linlithgow started in October 1988, when the Edinburgh Monarchs manager Alan Robertson revealed that a circuit would be built to enable younger riders to use it as a training circuit. The site would be known as Heathersfield Stadium and the location was on Myrehead Farm in Whitecross (55°58′46″N 3°39′32″W). The stadium was used a training track up until 1994, when Linlithgow Lightning (managed by Alan Robertson) joined the 1994 British League Division Three. The first fixture took place on 26 June 1994. In 1995, they raced in the 1995 Academy League but experienced financial issues during a troubled season.

During their third season, led by Barry Campbell, Blair Scott and Peter Scully, the team won the 1996 Speedway Conference League and the Conference League Knockout Cup.

The following season most of the league winning team moved up to the Premier League before they competed in the 1997 Speedway Conference League as Lathallan Lightning.

Alan Robertson did not enter a side during 1998 but he was joined by Edinburgh promoter John Campbell for the 1999 season and they managed a team for one more season during the 1999 Speedway Conference League season.

In September 1999, Linlithgow Lightning were told by the landowner that he was selling and that the team would have to move out. The club folded in 1999 and the venue closed in October 1999.

== Season summary ==
Year and league	Position	Notes
1994 British League Division Three	4th	
1995 Academy League	6th	
1996 Speedway Conference League	1st	Champions & Knockout Cup winners
1997 Speedway Conference League	11th	rode as Lathallan Lightning
1999 Speedway Conference League	6th	

== See also ==
- List of United Kingdom Speedway League Champions
