= Hayley Stadium =

Speedway track in Newport, Wales

Coordinates: 51°34′19″N 2°56′7″W

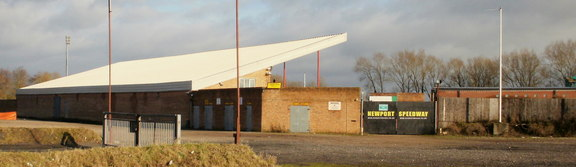
- Exterior of Hayley Stadium, January 2010
- Interactive map of Hayley Stadium
- Location: Newport, Wales
- Type: Stadium
- Field size: 311 yards (284 m)

Construction
- Closed: 2012

Tenant
- Newport Wasps (1997–2011)

Hayley Stadium was a purpose-built motorcycle speedway located at Queensway Meadows on the eastern side of Newport, Wales. The stadium was 311 yards (284 m) long, and home to the Newport Wasps speedway team.

== History ==
In 1997, Tim Stone helping to create a purpose-built speedway facility known as Queensway Meadows or the Hayley Stadium, on an open field next to an industrial site. He still had seating taken from the old Somerton Park venue. The opening meeting was held on 4 May 1997.

In March 2010, the Wasps engaged a minister to lift a gypsy curse on the stadium. In 2012, the Wasps folded, and within a week of closure, the offices in the main stand sustained fire damage; Hayley Stadium was subsequently demolished.
