= David Mason (speedway rider) =

English speedway rider

- Born: 20 December 1976 (age 49); Crawley, West Sussex, England
- Nationality: British (English)

Career history
- 1994–1996: Sittingbourne
- 1996: London
- 1997–1998, 2000: Arena Essex
- 1998: Newport
- 1998: Mildenhall
- 1999: Swindon
- 1999–2003, 2009–2010: Rye House
- 2004–2007: Weymouth
- 2011: Hackney
- 2013–2014, 2016: Kent
- 2015: Eastbourne
- 2017: Birmingham

Individual honours
- 2001: National League Riders' Champion

Team honours
- 2015: league champion (tier 3)

David Lee Mason (born 20 December 1976) is a former motorcycle speedway from England.

== Biography ==
Mason began his career at Sittingbourne Crusaders in 1994 and continued to race for them throughout 1995 and 1996, recording an impressive 11.38 average during the 1996 Speedway Conference League season, which was the highest league average alongside veteran Czech international Václav Verner. That season, he also tied with three other riders in the National League Riders' Championship on 12 points before being beaten in the run-off by Mike Hampson.

Also in 1996, Mason made his debut in the Premier League (the highest league at the time) for the London Lions. He spent the next two seasons with the Arena Essex Hammers before riding for Newport Wasps.

Mason joined the Mildenhall Fen Tigers in 1998 and appeared in the 1998 Speedway Conference League cup final.

Mason rode for Rye House Rockets from 1999 to 2003, which was where he experienced his best success, reaching two cup finals, becoming the 2001 the National League Riders' champion and scoring his first ever maximum in 2003.

Mason continued to ride until 2017, with the highlights being a knockout cup win with Weymouth Wildcats (2005) and runner-up in the National League Riders' Championship and a league and cup double with Eastbourne Eagles during the 2015 National League speedway season.
