= 1995 Academy League =

British motorcycle speedway season

- League: Academy League
- Season: 1995
- Champions: Berwick Bandits
- Knockout Cup: Berwick Bandits
- Individual: Kevin Little
- Division/s above: 1995 Premier League

The 1995 Academy League was the second tier/division of British speedway. It was effectively the same division of teams that had competed in the 1994 British League Division 3 but was renamed because the British League Division 1 and 2 had merged.

== Summary ==
Iwade speedway returned under a new promotion and new team name of Sittingbourne Crusaders. Cleveland Bays withdrew during the season and their results were expunged.

The title was won by Berwick Bandits who had also won the previous season's Division 3 title.

== Final league table ==
Pos	Team	Played	W	D	L	F	A	Pts	Bonus	Total
1	Berwick Bandits	12	10	0	2	683	419	20	6	26
2	Stoke Potters	12	9	0	3	605	526	18	4	22
3	Hi-Edge Hitmen	12	7	0	5	575	572	14	3	17
4	Sittingbourne Crusaders	12	7	0	5	555	590	14	3	17
5	Mildenhall Fen Tigers	12	5	0	7	544	563	10	3	13
6	Linlithgow Lightning	12	2	0	10	513	614	4	2	6
7	Devon Demons	12	2	0	10	513	614	4	2	6

Cleveland Bays withdrew.

== Fixtures & results ==
Home \ Away	CB	BER	DEV	HI	LL	MIL	SIT	STO
Cleveland Bays		n/a	n/a	n/a	n/a	n/a	n/a	n/a
Berwick Bandits	n/a		71–24	68–27	71–24	64–31	63–32	61–35
Devon Demons	n/a	44–52		47–49	66–30	40–56	54–42	44–51
Hi-Edge Hitmen	48–48	52–48	62–34		53–43	50–46	62–34	41–54
Linlithgow Lightning	58–38	42–53	70–25	43–50		46–50	32–62	80–0
Mildenhall Fen Tigers	56–40	18–36	57–39	52–44	66–30		46–50	42–65
Sittingbourne Crusaders	n/a	39–56	61–35	56–40	55–40	50–45		49–47
Stoke Potters	n/a	53–42	69–27	49–47	63–33	60–47	70–25	

Legend: Blue = home team win; Yellow = draw; Red = away team win.

== Academy League Knockout Cup ==
The 1995 Academy League Knockout Cup was the 28th edition of the Knockout Cup for tier two teams.

It was only the tier two competition because the Division 1 & 2 had merged, this meant that the newly formed Academy League was tier two of British speedway at the time. Berwick Bandits were awarded the Cup following a first leg final victory, Stoke did not hold the second leg due to rain.

First round

Dates	Team one	Team two	Scores
21/05, 04/06	Mildenhall	Sittingbourne	62-47, 51–56
28/05, 03/06	Linlithgow	Berwick	45-52, 39–69
01/06, 15/06	Devon	Stoke	45-61, 33–73

Semi final

Dates	Team one	Team two	Scores
29/07, 01/10	Stoke	Mildenhall	60-47, 65–42
23/00, 14/10	Berwick	Buxton	66-44, 48–52

=== Final ===
First Leg

21 October

Berwick Bandits; Gareth Martin 13; Darren Pearson 12; Chris Readshaw 10; Kevin Little 9 William Beveridge 6 Peter Johnson 6 David Meldrum 1	63–42	Stoke Potters; Chris Cobby 16; Glyn Taylor 11; Colin Earl 5 Colin Thorpe 4 Lee Dicken 3 Drew Wheeldon 0 Stephen Read 0 Ade Hoole R/R	Berrington Lough Stadium

Second Leg

26 October	Stoke Potters	not held–(rain)	Berwick Bandits	Loomer Road Stadium

== Riders' Championship ==
Kevin Little won the Riders' Championship, held on 2 September at Long Eaton Stadium.

Pos.	Rider	Team	Total
1	Kevin Little	Berwick	15
2	Chris Cobby	Stoke	14
3	Andre Compton	Hi-Edge Buxton	13
4	Roger Horspool	Mildenhall	12
5	Paul Gould	Berwick	11
6	Gareth Martin	Berwick	8
7	Greg Daniels	Devon	7
8	David Mason	Sittingbourne	7
9	Simon Wolstenholme	Mildenhall	7
10	Neil Hewitt	Linlithgow	6
11	Ade Hoole	Stoke	6
12	Dean Chapman	Sittingbourne	5
13	Andy Howe	Cleveland	4
14	Mike Bowden	Devon	2
15	Paul Taylor	Linlithgow	1
16	Richard Webb	Hi-Edge Buxton	1
17	Anthony Reason (res)		1

== See also ==
- List of United Kingdom Speedway League Champions
- Knockout Cup (speedway)
