= St Austell Gulls =

Defunct British speedway team

Club information
- Track address: 1949–1964; Cornish Stadium; Par; St Austell; 1997–2000; Clay Country Moto Parc; Longstone Pit; Old Pound; Nanpean; St Austell
- Country: England
- Founded: 1949
- Closed: 2000 replaced by Trelawny Tigers

Club facts
- Colours: Blue and White
- Track size: 360 yards (330 m) 1949-1964; 230 metres (250 yd) 1997–2000

Major team honours
| Conference League Champions | 1998 |
| Conference League KO Cup | 1998, 1999 |

The St Austell Gulls were a speedway team which operated from 1949 until their closure in 1964 at the Cornish Stadium at Par, St Austell in Cornwall. In 1997 the team rode at the Clay Country Moto Parc until the club finally closed in 2000.

== Early years ==
=== 1949 to 1954 ===
The Cornish Stadium took two years to build but once in place works started on a £10,000 speedway cinder track which was designed by famous riders Jack Parker, Vic Duggan and Bill Kitchen.

In 1949, the track operated under an open licence but ran a series of meetings under the team names, the St Austell Pixies and St Austell Badgers before finally settling on the Gulls nickname.

In 1950, the Gulls entered National League Division Three and competed again in 1951. In 1952 they entered the Southern League, finishing bottom and again the following season but rising just the one place. Former West Ham Hammers and Harringay Racers star George Newton managed the team, having ridden for the Gulls in 1951. In 1954 the Southern League was disbanded. Without a league to race in, the Gulls applied to join the National League Division Two. However, the Speedway Control Board decided against giving the club a licence and the riders were reallocated.

=== 1962 to 1963 ===
League racing was not seen again at the stadium until 1963 when the Gulls entered the Provincial League, although the Neath Dragons did finish off their 1962 Provincial League fixtures at the stadium under promoter Trevor Redmond. Redmond promoted the Gulls in 1963 but it turned out to be their only season of league racing until 1997.

=== 1997 to 2000 ===
In 1997 permission was given to promoter Brian Annear to build a track in a disused china clay pit. A small track was built with very basic facilities, the referee's control room was a converted caravan, which was replaced eventually by a double decker bus. The Gulls entered the Amateur League, which became the Conference League.

The track was rather rutted as it bedded in but by the start of the 1998 season, the team of mainly local riders started to become a solid outfit. Future 2007 British Speedway Grand Prix winner Chris Harris made his League debut at fifteen years of age. By the end of the season, the team had completed the League Championship and Knockout Cup double.

In 1999, the Gulls retained the Knockout Cup. The Gulls final season came in 2000 when it was becoming obvious the club was ready to join the Premier League. The current owners of the club felt that they could not take the club further and the track lease was handed over to another consortium who opened up in 2001 as the Trelawny Tigers.

== Season summary ==
| Year and league | Position | Notes |
|---|---|---|
| 1950 Speedway National League Division Three | 10th | |
| 1951 Speedway National League Division Three | 8th | |
| 1952 Speedway Southern League | 10th | |
| 1953 Speedway Southern League | 7th | |
| 1963 Provincial Speedway League | 5th | |
| 1997 Speedway Conference League | 6th | |
| 1998 Speedway Conference League | 1st | Champions & Knockout Cup winners |
| 1999 Speedway Conference League | 2nd | Knockout Cup winners |
| 2000 Speedway Conference League | 7th | |

== Notable riders ==
- (England) Lloyd Goffe
- (England) Chris Harris
- (England) Cyril Maidment
- (Australia) Peter Moore
- (England) George Newton
- (New Zealand) Trevor Redmond
