= Conference League (speedway) =

Lowest division of motorcycle speedway in the UK

- Sport: Speedway
- Founded: 1996
- Folded: 2008 replaced by 2009 National League
- Replaced by: National League (speedway)
- Country: United Kingdom
- Last champion: Weymouth Wildcats
- Website: british-speedway.co.uk

The Conference League was the third and lowest division of motorcycle speedway racing in the United Kingdom governed by the Speedway Control Board (SCB), in conjunction with the British Speedway Promoters' Association (BSPA). The other leagues being the Elite League and Premier League. The League consisted of eight teams for the 2008 season. In 2009 it was replaced with the National League.

== History ==
The British League Division Three had been created in 1994 as a replacement for the second-half junior leagues that were scrapped when British League matches were extended to eighteen heats. The league was renamed the British Academy League in 1995, but many of the teams that took part experienced severe financial problems. In order to reduce costs, the league was re-launched as the Conference league in 1996 and was an entirely amateur competition. The revamped competition proved to be successful, with several new teams joining and some tracks attracting crowds on par with the Premier League.

The league expanded to thirteen teams in 1997 and was renamed again to the British Amateur League. However, the 1997 season exposed a number of problems; some teams wished to include more established riders but others felt the focus should be on youth development. It was therefore decided by the BSPA that Elite League and Premier League teams could operate second teams in a separate youth competition known as the British Development League. The remaining teams formed a third division that had less restrictions on the use of riders and reverted the competition name to the Conference League.

== Champions ==
Season	Champions
1996	Linlithgow Lightning
1997	Peterborough Pumas
1998	St Austell Gulls
1999	Newport Mavericks
2000	Sheffield Prowlers
2001	Sheffield Prowlers
2002	Peterborough Pumas
2003	Mildenhall Fen Tigers
2004	Mildenhall Fen Tigers
2005	Oxford Lions
2006	Scunthorpe Scorpions
2007	Scunthorpe Scorpions
2008	Weymouth Wildcats

== See also ==
- List of United Kingdom Speedway League Champions
- Knockout Cup (speedway)
