= 2011 National League speedway season =

British motorcycle speedway season

- League: National League
- Champions: Scunthorpe & Sheffield Saints
- Knockout Cup: Mildenhall Fen Tigers
- Individual: Jason Garrity
- Pairs: Stoke Potters
- Fours: Dudley Heathens
- Division/s above: 2011 Elite League; 2011 Premier League

The 2011 season of the National League, the third tier of British speedway was contested by ten teams, with Scunthorpe & Sheffield Saints winning the play-offs to become champions.

== Final table ==
Pos	Team	PL	W	D	L	BP	Pts
1	Stoke Potters	18	13	0	5	17	43
2	Scunthorpe & Sheffield Saints	18	11	0	7	14	36
3	Belle Vue Colts	18	11	0	7	13	35
4	Mildenhall Fen Tigers	18	11	2	5	11	35
5	Hackney Hawks	18	8	0	10	12	28
6	King's Lynn Young Stars	18	8	1	9	9	26
7	Dudley Heathens	18	8	1	9	8	25
8	Buxton Hitmen	18	6	0	12	9	21
9	Isle of Wight Islanders	18	6	1	11	3	16
10	Newport Hornets	18	5	1	12	4	15

PL = Matches; W = Wins; D = Draws; L = Losses; BP = Bonus Pts Pts = Total Points

SCORING SYSTEM Home loss by any number of points = 0 Home draw = 1 Home win by between 1 and 6 points = 2 Home win by 7 points or more = 3 Away loss by 7 points or more = 0 Away loss by 6 points or less = 1 Away draw = 2 Away win by between 1 and 6 points = 3 Away win by 7 points or more = 4

== Fixtures & results ==
Home \ Away	BV	BUX	DH	HH	IOW	KL	MIL	NEW	SCU	STO
Belle Vue Colts		38–33	53–15	46–44	50–37	59–33	59–32	57–35	60–31	55–37
Buxton Hitmen	40–50		44–47	40–50	57–36	46–47	45–44	61–31	55–33	51–39
Dudley Heathens	46–44	40–55		49–41	59–34	57–39	38–51	52–43	47–43	27–64
Hackney Hawks	48–39	54–41	42–48		58–35	49–41	42–48	59–35	52–39	53–41
Isle of Wight Islanders	53–39	49–44	42–33	47–43		46–44	45–45	47–43	43–50	42–48
King's Lynn Young Stars	59–34	53–40	48–41	47–45	61–31		45–45	61–32	34–58	41–49
Mildenhall Fen Tigers	47–42	47–43	45–44	57–35	61–33	56–37		60–36	47–43	49–43
Newport Hornets	35–55	56–37	36–36	54–39	47–43	43–46	47–46		50–37	43–50
Scunthorpe & Sheffield Saints	59–35	50–43	63–28	64–26	61–32	48–42	51–39	54–39		50–39
Stoke Potters	53–40	50–39	61–34	59–33	61–34	56–37	57–36	41–30	49–41	

Legend: Blue = home team win; Yellow = draw; Red = away team win.

== Play Offs ==
Top four teams race off in two-legged semi-finals and final to decide championship. The winner was Scunthorpe & Sheffield Saints who defeated the Mildenhall Fen Tigers in the final.

Semi-finals

Date	Team one	Score	Team two
14/10	Scunthorpe/Sheffield	51-42	Belle Vue
02/10	Mildenhall	51-40	Stoke
01/10	Stoke	44-46	Mildenhall
28/10	Belle Vue	46-41	Scunthorpe/Sheffield

=== Final ===
21 October	Scunthorpe & Sheffield Saints; Steven Worrall 12; Richie Worrall 12; Adam Wrathall 11; Stefan Nielsen 10; Ashley Birks 8 Gary Irving 6 Lee Smethills 3	62–33	Mildenhall Fen Tigers; Cameron Heeps 15; Lewis Blackbird 8 Daniel Halsey 6 Jack Hargreaves 2 Aaron Baseby 2 Joe Jacobs 0 Mark Baseby r/r	Eddie Wright Raceway

23 October	Mildenhall Fen Tigers; Cameron Heeps 13; Daniel Halsey 13; Lewis Blackbird 12; Mark Baseby 10; Aaron Baseby 8 Joe Jacobs 3 Jack Hargreaves r/r	59–31	Scunthorpe & Sheffield Saints; Richie Worrall 13; Ashley Birks 9 Adam Wrathall 3 Steven Worrall 2 Lee Smethills 2 Stefan Nielsen 2 Gary Irving r/r	Mildenhall Stadium

== Final Leading averages ==
Rider	Team	Average
Kyle Howarth	Belle Vue	9.86
Todd Kurtz	Newport	9.78
Simon Lambert	Stoke	9.45

== National League Knockout Cup ==
The 2011 National League Knockout Cup was the 14th edition of the Knockout Cup for tier three teams. Mildenhall Fen Tigers were the winners.

First round

Date	Team one	Score	Team two
11/06	Hackney	42-50	Mildenhall
05/06	Mildenhall	60-32	Hackney
04/06	Stoke	57-35	Buxton
01/06	Belle Vue Colts	39-52	Dudley
17/05	Dudley	45-39	Belle Vue Colts
14/05	Newport Hornets	53-40	Isle Of Wight
10/05	Isle Of Wight	56-38	Newport Hornets
01/05	Buxton	45-44	Stoke

Semi-finals

Date	Team one	Score	Team two
13/09	Isle Of Wight	44-46	Mildenhall
28/08	Mildenhall	57-37	Isle Of Wight
28/06	Dudley	47-43	Stoke
26/06	Stoke	62-32	Dudley

=== Final ===
22 October	Stoke Potters; James Sarjeant 11; Tim Webster 8 Jason Garrity (guest) 6 Jamie Pickard 6 Ben Reade 5 Tony Atkin 4 Oliver Greenwood (guest) 0	40–52	Mildenhall Fen Tigers; Dan Halsey 12; Mark Baseby 9 Cameron Heeps 8 Joe Jacobs 7 Lewis Blackbird 7 Aaron Baseby 4 Jack Hargreaves 2	Loomer Road Stadium

25 October	Mildenhall Fen Tigers; Dan Halsey 12; Lewis Blackbird 10; Cameron Heeps 9 Aaron Baseby 7 Mark Baseby 6 Jack Hargreaves 4 Joe Jacobs 3	51–43	Stoke Potters; Simon Lambert 18; James Sarjeant 11; Tim Webster 6 Jamie Pickard 4 Gareth Isherwood 2 Tony Atkin 1 Tim Nobes 1	Mildenhall Stadium

== Riders' Championship ==
Jason Garrity won the Riders' Championship. The final was held on 3 September at Rye House Stadium.

Pos.	Rider	Team	Total
1	Jason Garrity	Belle Vue	12
2	Kyle Howarth	Belle Vue	11
3	Jay Herne	Newport	10
4	Robert Branford	Buxton	10
5	Richie Worrall	Scunthorpe/Sheffield	9
6	Todd Kurtz	Newport	9
7	Ashley Morris	Dudley	9
8	Simon Lambert	Stoke	8
9	Steve Worrall	Scunthorpe/Sheffield	7
10	David Mason	Hackney	7
11	Jack Hargreaves	Mildenhall	6
12	James Cockle	King's Lynn	6
13	Adam Allott	Buxton	5
14	Tim Webster	Stoke	5
15	Nick Simmons	Isle of Wight	4
16	Barrie Evans	Hackney	1

== Pairs ==
The National League Pairs Championship, was held at Hayley Stadium, on 18 June 2011. The event was won by Tim Webster and Simon Lambert of the Stoke Potters.

Group A
Pos	Team	Pts	Riders
1	Newport	26	Kurtz 15, Herne 11
2	Scunthorpe/Sheffield	22	Worrall R 14 Worrall S 8
3	Belle Vue	17	Garrity 9, McKinna 8
4	Hackney	15	Evans 8, Hazelden 7
5	King's Lynn	10	Knight 7, Kerr 3

Group B
Pos	Team	Pts	Riders
1	Stoke	23	Lambert 14, Webster 9
2	Mildenhall	21	Hargreaves 12, Blackbird 9
3	Dudley	20	Newman 11, Armstrong 9
4	Isle of Wight	13	Simmons 9, Smith 4
5	Byxton	13	Allott 8, Luke Priest 5

Final

- Stoke bt Newport 5–4

== Fours ==
Dudley won the National League Fours, held on 30 July 2011 at Loomer Road Stadium.

Group A
Pos	Team	Pts	Riders
1	Mildenhall	22	Hargreaves 5, Blackbird 5, Heeps 5, Jacobs 3
2	Dudley	16	Franklin 5, Morris 4, Armstrong 4, Roynon 3
3	Isle of Wight	11	Starke 6, Simmons 1, Smith 1, Warwick 0
4	Hackney	6	Morley 2, Owen 2, Reade 1, Hopwood 1

Group B
Pos	Team	Pts	Riders
1	Stoke	14	Lambert 6, Atkin 4, Pickard 3, Webster 1
2	Belle Vue	13	Bekker 4, Garrity 4, Mason 4, McKinna 3
3	Buxton	10	Taylor 3, Allott 3, Priest 2, Branford 2
4	Newport	3	Herne 2, Johnson 1, Jones 0, Andrews 0

Final
Pos	Team	Pts	Riders
1	Dudley	15	Roynon 6, Morris 4, Armstrong 3, Franklin 2
2	Belle Vue	12	Bekker 4, McKinna 4, Garrity 4, Mason 0
3	Stoke	12	Atkin 4, Lambert 3, Webster 3, Pickard 2
4	Mildenhall	9	Heeps 3, Jacobs 3, Hargreaves 2, Blackbird 1

== Teams and final averages ==
Belle Vue Colts

- Kyle Howarth 9.86
- Jason Garrity 8.77
- Adam McKinna 7.18
- Byron Bekker 6.55
- Karl Mason 5.31
- Scott Richardson 4.49
- Chris Widman 3.16

Buxton Hitmen

- Robert Branford 8.52
- Adam Allott 8.10
- Ben Taylor 7.61
- Luke Priest 5.88
- Dean Felton 4.97
- Paul Burnett 3.26
- Ryan Blacklock 3.00

Dudley Heathens

- Jon Armstrong 8.11
- Jamie Courtney 6.75
- Ashley Morris 6.63
- Tom Perry 5.89
- Richard Franklin 4.84
- Daryl Ritchings 4.29
- Danny Stoneman 3.00
- Adam Portwood 3.00

Hackney Hawks

- David Mason 7.16
- Barrie Evans 6.97
- Ben Morley 6.63
- Shane Hazelden 6.35
- Ben Hopwood 5.96
- Marc Owen 5.05
- Brandon Freemantle 3.00

Isle of Wight Islanders

- Nick Simmons 8.51
- Rob Smith 6.48
- Danny Warwick 6.19
- Paul Starke 5.89
- Gary Cotham 4.22
- Luke Chessell 3.51
- Rikki Mullins 3.00

King's Lynn Young Stars

- Kyle Hughes 8.96
- James Cockle 7.47
- Jake Knight 6.59
- Lewis Kerr 5.28
- Scott Campos 5.16
- Oliver Rayson 4.58
- Tom Stokes 3.69

Mildenhall Fen Tigers

- Cameron Heeps 9.18
- Jack Hargreaves 7.08
- Lewis Blackbird 7.01
- Joe Jacobs 6.27
- Mark Baseby 5.67
- Aaron Baseby 4.88
- Danny Halsey 4.76

Newport Hornets

- Todd Kurtz 9.78
- Brendan Johnson 4.71
- Matt Bates 4.64
- Jay Herne 8.06
- James White-Williams 4.46
- Tom Young 4.42
- Richard Andrews 3.15

Scunthorpe & Sheffield Saints

- Gary Irving 7.91
- Steve Worrall 8.35
- Ashley Birks 8.28
- Richie Worrall 7.71
- Benji Compton 6.28
- Lee Smethills 6.07
- Stefan Nielsen 5.28
- Adam Wrathall 4.34

Stoke Potters

- Simon Lambert 9.45
- Tim Webster 8.30
- Tony Atkin 7.89
- Jamie Pickard 6.81
- James Sarjeant 6.30
- Gareth Isherwood 4.92
- Ben Reade 3.00
- Tim Nobes 3.00

== Midland Development League ==
Pos	team	P	W	D	L	B	Pts
1	Long Eaton Invaders	8	5	1	2	4	15
2	Team Viking Academy	8	5	0	3	3	13
3	Halifax Dukes	8	3	2	3	1	9
4	Sheffield Cubs	8	2	2	4	1	7
5	Scunthorpe Stags	8	2	1	5	1	6

Long Eaton won grand final 40–32 on aggregate

== See also ==
- List of United Kingdom Speedway League Champions
- Knockout Cup (speedway)
