= 2013 National League speedway season =

British motorcycle speedway season

- League: National League
- Champions: Dudley Heathens
- Knockout Cup: Dudley Heathens
- Individual: Steve Boxall
- Pairs: Dudley Heathens
- Fours: Dudley Heathens
- National Trophy: Isle of Wight Islanders
- Division/s above: 2013 Elite League; 2013 Premier League

The 2013 season of the National League, the third tier of British speedway was contested by eight teams.

== Summary ==
Scunthorpe Saints and Rye House Cobras were both missing from the 2012 league. Two newcomers were the Coventry Storm and the newly formed Kent Kings.

The Dudley Heathens were champions.

== Final table ==
Pos	Team	PL	W	D	L	Pts
1	Dudley Heathens	13	11	0	2	37
2	King's Lynn Young Stars	13	8	0	5	27
3	Mildenhall Fen Tigers	13	8	0	5	25
4	Isle of Wight Islanders	14	7	0	7	22
5	Coventry Storm	14	6	0	8	19
6	Buxton Hitmen	14	6	0	8	18
7	Kent Kings	13	5	0	8	15
8	Stoke Potters	12	2	0	10	7

PL = Matches; W = Wins; D = Draws; L = Losses; Pts = Total Points

Scoring system:
Home loss by any number of points = 0
Home draw = 1
Home win by between 1 and 6 points = 2
Home win by 7 points or more = 3
Away loss by 7 points or more = 0
Away loss by 6 points or fewer = 1
Away draw = 2
Away win by between 1 and 6 points = 3
Away win by 7 points or more = 4

== Fixtures & results ==
Home \ Away	BUX	COV	DH	IOW	KK	KL	MIL	STO
Buxton Hitmen		46–47	43–46	45–44	60–31	59–31	54–35	41–49
Coventry Storm	48–45		41–49	42–50	59–33	39–53	40–48	56–39
Dudley Heathens	60–32	62–30		60–31	53–39	56–36	56–36	66–28
Isle of Wight Islanders	55–37	48–42	37–52		48–42	54–39	60–33	68–22
Kent Kings	55–38	54–39	49–41	47–43		40–49	39–52	53–42
King's Lynn Young Stars	53–42	42–48	n/a	49–41	58–35		52–40	38–21
Mildenhall Fen Tigers	44–46	48–41	48–42	50–40	53–39	52–36		50–40
Stoke Potters	46–47	37–55	38–50	53–37	n/a	41–49	n/a	

Legend: Blue = home team win; Yellow = draw; Red = away team win.

== Playoffs ==
Top four teams race off in two-legged semi-finals and final to decide the championship. Dudley Heathens defeated King's Lynn Young Stars in the final.

Semi-finals

Date	Team one	Score	Team two
02/10	King's Lynn	57-39	Mildenhall
01/10	Isle of Wight	43-47	Dudley
29/09	Mildenhall	49-41	King's Lynn
24/09	Dudley	59-31	Isle of Wight

=== Final ===
8 October	Dudley Heathens; Ashley Morris 15; Lewis Blackbird 11; Paul Starke 8 Max Clegg 6 Gareth Isherwood 5 Dan Greenwood 5 Nathan Greaves 3	53–30	King's Lynn Young Stars; Lewis Kerr 12; Darren Mallett 9 Lewis Rose 6 Robert Lambert 6 Jake Knight 3 Shane Waldron 3 Josh Bailey 1	Monmore Green Stadium

9 October	King's Lynn Young Stars; Robert Lambert 10; Lewis Rose 10; Darren Mallett 9 Lewis Kerr 7 Jake Knight 5 Shane Waldron 4 Josh Bailey 1.	46–47	Dudley Heathens; Ashley Morris 13; Lewis Blackbird 8 Dan Greenwood 7 Paul Starke 6 Nathan Greaves 6 Gareth Isherwood 4 Max Clegg 3	King's Lynn Stadium

== National League Knockout Cup ==
The 2013 National League Knockout Cup was the 16th edition of the Knockout Cup for tier three teams. Dudley Heathens were the winners.

First round

Date	Team one	Score	Team two
04/08	Buxton	47-43	Dudley
09/07	Isle of Wight	61-32	Kent
24/06	Kent	44-49	Isle of Wight
19/06	King's Lynn	64-26	Stoke
08/06	Stoke	57-32	King's Lynn
04/06	Dudley	55-39	Buxton
26/05	Mildenhall	48-42	Coventry Storm
17/05	Coventry Storm	45-47	Mildenhall

Semi-finals

Date	Team one	Score	Team two
24/10	Mildenhall	44-46	Isle of Wight
15/10	Isle of Wight	46-44	Mildenhall
08/10	Isle of Wight	50-40	Mildenhall
5/09	King's Lynn	44-46	Dudley
22/09	Mildenhall	50-40	Isle of Wight
10/09	Dudley	56-34	King's Lynn

=== Final ===
29 October	Dudley Heathens; Ashley Morris 14; Paul Starke 11; Lewis Blackbird 10; Dan Greenwood 9 Nathan Greaves 5 Max Clegg 5 Gareth Isherwood 4	58–33	Isle of Wight Islanders; Steve Worrall 10; Tom Perry 8 Lee Payne 5 Ben Hopwood 4 Chris Widman 4 Reece Downes 2 Brendan Johnson R/R	Monmore Green Stadium

30 October	Isle of Wight Islanders; Steve Worrall 14; Ben Hopwood 10; Tom Perry 8 Reece Downes 7 Luke Priest 5 Chris Widman 4 Darryl Ritchings R/R	48–44	Dudley Heathens; Ashley Morris 11; Lewis Blackbird 10; Paul Starke 8 Dan Greenwood 5 Nathan Greaves 4 Gareth Isherwood 3 Max Clegg 3	Smallbrook Stadium

== Riders' Championship ==
Steve Boxall won the Riders' Championship for the second time. The final was held on 21 September at Rye House Stadium.

Pos.	Rider	Total
1	Steve Boxall	14+3
2	Lewis Kerr	14+2
3	Lewis Blackbird	12
4	Steve Worrall	11
5	Robert Lambert	11
6	Stefan Nielsen	9
7	Charles Wright	8
8	Ben Morley	6
9	Paul Starke	6
10	Tom Perry	5
11	Joe Jacobs	5
12	James Sarjeant	5
13	Liam Carr	4
14	Ashley Morris	4
15	Josh Bates	0
16	Adam Ellis	0

== Pairs ==
The National League Pairs Championship, was held at Mildenhall Stadium, on 30 June 2013. The event was won by Ashley Morris and Lewis Blackbird of the Mildenhall Fen Tigers.

Group A
Pos	Team	Pts	Riders
1	Dudley	18	Morris 10, Blackbird 8
2	Stoke	15	Smart 9, Priest 6
3	Isle of Wight	11	Hopwood 9, Ritchings 2
4	King's Lynn	10	Waldron 5, Worrall S 5

Group B
Pos	Team	Pts	Riders
1	Mildenhall	14	Halsey 9, Bates 5
2	Kent	14	Boxall 12, Morley 2
3	Coventry	13	Sarjeant 7, Branford 6
4	Buxton	13	Wright 11, McKinna 2

Final
Pos	Team	Pts	Riders
1	Dudley	17	Blackbird 9, Morris 8
2	Mildenhall	15	Halsey 10, Bates 5
3	Kent	14	Boxall 8, Morley 6
4	Stoke	8	Priest 6, Smart 2

== Fours ==
Dudley won the National League Fours, held on 18 August 2013 at Loomer Road Stadium.

Group A
Pos	Team	Pts	Riders
1	King's Lynn	16	Kerr 6, Mallett 5, Rose 4, Knight 1
2	Mildenhall	15	Armstrong 5, Stoneman 4, Bates 3, Halsey 3
3	Isle of Wight	10	Ritchings 4, Hopwood 2, Johnson 2, Ellis 2
4	Coventry	7	Sarjeant 5, Greenwood 2, Terry-Daley 0, Shanes 0

Group B
Pos	Team	Pts	Riders
1	Dudley	17	Starke 6, Blackbird 5, Morris 4, Isherwood 1, Ward 1
2	Kent	12	Boxall 6, Compton 5, Mason 1, Morley 0
3	Stoke	11	Worrall 4, Hughes 4, Priest 3, Payne 0
4	Buxton	8	McKinna 3, Wright 3, Carr 2, Blacklock 0

Final
Pos	Team	Pts	Riders
1	Dudley	14	Starke 6, Morris 5, Blackbird 3, Isherwood 0
2	Kent	13	Boxall 5, Compton 4, Morley 2, Mason 2
3	Mildenhall	11	Halsey 5, Bates 4, Armstrong 2, Stoneman 0
4	King's Lynn	10	Kerr 5, Mallett 3, Rose 1, Knight 1

== National Trophy ==
Pos	team	P	Pts
1	Isle of Wight	8	22
2	Mildenhall	8	17
3	Stoke	8	13
4	Buxton	8	7
5	Kent	8	3

== Final leading averages ==
Rider	Team	Average
Lewis Blackbird	Dudley	10.49
Charles Wright	Buxton	10.37
Robert Lambert	Kings Lynn	10.30

== Teams and final averages ==
Buxton Hitmen

- Charles Wright 10.37
- Tony Atkin 7.75
- Liam Carr 6.87
- Adam McKinna 6.22
- Lee Smart 5.76
- Ryan Blacklock 4.43
- Tom Woolley 3.64
- Matt Williamson 3.33
- Tyler Govier 3.00

Coventry Storm

- Joe Jacobs 8.71
- Robert Branford 8.53
- James Sarjeant 7.38
- Oliver Greenwood 6.89
- Richard Franklin 4.84
- Luke Crang 4.78
- Trevor Heath 4.18
- James Shanes 3.46
- Martin Knuckey 3.00
- Tommy Fenwick 3.00

Dudley Heathens

- Lewis Blackbird 10.49
- Paul Starke 9.93
- Ashley Morris 8.83
- Max Clegg 6.27
- Dan Greenwood 5.74
- Gareth Isherwood 4.57
- Nathan Greaves 4.00

Isle of Wight Islanders

- Adam Ellis 8.90
- Byron Bekker 7.44
- Ben Hopwood 6.89
- Tom Perry 6.30
- Darryl Ritchings 5.94
- Brendan Johnson 4.84
- Danny Stoneman 4.29
- Chris Widman 3.50
- Brandon Freemantle 3.00

Kent Kings

- Steve Boxall 9.56
- Ben Morley 7.13
- David Mason 6.38
- Jack Kingston 4.20
- Connor Coles 3.67
- Adam Kirby 3.00
- Sam Woods 3.00

King's Lynn Young Stars

- Robert Lambert 10.30
- Lewis Kerr 8.22
- Jake Knight 7.62
- Lewis Rose 6.76
- James Cockle 6.24
- Shane Hazelden 4.77
- Scott Campos 4.56
- Shane Waldron 3.00

Mildenhall Fen Tigers

- Stefan Nielsen 8.00
- Jon Armstrong 7.93
- Josh Bates 7.49
- Danny Halsey 7.43
- Aaron Baseby 4.56
- Nathan Stoneman 3.35
- Liam Rumsey 3.05

Stoke Potters

- Ben Reade 7.70
- Steve Worrall 7.09
- Tom Young 7.04
- Kyle Hughes 6.22
- Lee Payne 4.90
- Luke Priest 4.75
- Luke Chessell 4.22
- Shaun Tedham 3.00
- Emerson Jones 3.00

== Development Leagues ==
=== Midland Development League ===
Pos	team	P	W	D	L	Pts
1	Belle Vue Colts	12	8	1	4	16
2	Milton Keynes	11	7	1	3	15
3	Kings Lynn	12	6	2	4	14
4	Stoke	12	5	2	5	12
5	Castleford	11	4	1	6	9
6	Coventry	12	4	1	7	9
7	Long Eaton	12	3	1	8	7

=== Northern Junior League ===
Pos	team	P	W	D	L	Pts
1	Redcar	8	6	1	1	13
2	Workington	8	6	0	2	12
3	Northside	8	4	1	3	9
4	Newcastle	8	1	1	6	3
5	Berwick	8	1	1	6	3

== See also ==
- List of United Kingdom Speedway League Champions
