= Sheffield Tigers seasons =

The Sheffield Tigers are a speedway team based in Sheffield, England.

== 2006 season ==
2006 Season Competitions
Premier League
- Position: 2nd
- Qualified For: Play-Offs

Premier League Play-Offs
- Position: Finalists
- Lost To: Kings Lynn Stars

Premier Trophy
- Position: Finalists
- Lost To: Kings Lynn Stars

Premier League KOC
- Position: Semi-finalists
- Lost To: Somerset Rebels

Premier League Fours
- Position: 3rd
- Represented By: Andre Compton; Ricky Ashworth; Ben Wilson; Kyle Legault

Premier League Pairs
- Position: 2nd
- Represented By: Ricky Ashworth; Ben Wilson

Premier League Riders Championship
- Position: T7
- Represented By: Andre Compton

=== Season Overview ===
The Tigers came 2nd in the Premier League, allowing them entry to the play-off's ultimately losing 100–86 over two legs to King's Lynn Stars in the Grand Final. They also came 2nd in the Premier Trophy, losing again in the final to King's Lynn. They rode well in both the Fours and the Pairs, but never actually won. In the Fours (Compton, Ashworth, Legault and Ben Wilson) they reached the final, only to finish 3rd behind Somerset Rebels and winners Workington Comets. In the Pairs, they were without captain Compton due to injury, but Ben Wilson and Ashworth got through to the final, only to lose to the favourites and hosts Glasgow Tigers. They also fell in the semi-finals of the Knock-Out Cup to the Somerset Rebels, losing by one point on aggregate. Despite having a strong team, no trophies came back to Owlerton even though they performed well in all competitions.

=== Team ===
| Rider | Opening CMA | Closing CMA | Change in CMA |
| (England) Andre Compton (C) | 8.48 | 9.65 | +1.17 |
| (England) Ricky Ashworth | 7.54 | 7.74 | +0.20 |
| (England) Ben Wilson | 5.37 | 7.08 | +1.71 |
| (Argentina) Emiliano Sanchez | 6.89 | 7.38 | +0.49 |
| (Canada) Kyle Legault | 4.57 | 6.75 | +2.18 |
| (England) Paul Cooper | 3.92 | 3.79 | -0.13 |
| (England) Mark Thompson | 3.00 | 3.00 | No Change |
| (England) Tai Woffinden | 3.00 | 3.00 | No Change |

Also Rode

| (England) Benji Compton | 3.00 | 3.10 | +0.10 |

=== Season Facts ===
- Fastest Time Set at Owlerton in 2006 - 59.5s by Chris Holder for Isle of Wight Islanders against Sheffield Tigers on 12 October (PL Play-Off SF)
- Biggest Home Win - 63–27 against Mildenhall Fen Tigers on 14 Sept (PL)
- Biggest Home Defeat - 44–45 against Stoke Potters on 3 August (PL)
- Biggest Away Win - 50–39 against Newport Wasps on 9 July (PL)
- Biggest Away Defeat - 30–63 against Kings Lynn Stars on 27 October (PL Play-Off FINAL)

== 2007 season ==
2007 Season Competitions
Premier League
- Position: 4th
- Qualified For: Play-Offs

Premier League Play-Offs
- Position: Finalists
- Lost To: Rye House Rockets

Premier Trophy
- Position: 3rd in Midland Group
- KO Stages: DNQ

Premier League KOC
- Position: 1st round
- Lost To: Edinburgh Monarchs

Premier League Fours
- Position: 8th
- Represented By: Andre Compton; Ricky Ashworth; Ben Wilson; Joel Parsons

Premier League Pairs
- Position: 8th
- Represented By: Andre Compton; Ricky Ashworth

Premier League Riders Championship
- Position: 13th
- Represented By: Andre Compton

=== Season Overview ===
The Tigers came 4th in the Premier League, and, unlike the previous year overcame King's Lynn Stars with an aggregate score of 99–86. In the Grand Final they met Rye House Rockets, but were convincingly beaten over two legs 111–74.

=== Team ===
| Rider | Opening CMA | Closing CMA | Change in CMA |
| (England) Andre Compton (C) | 9.41 | 10.04 | +0.63 |
| (England) Ricky Ashworth | 7.55 | 7.84 | +0.29 |
| (England) Ben Wilson | 6.90 | 6.88 | -0.02 |
| (Australia) Joel Parsons | 4.46 | 5.96 | +1.50 |
| (England) Paul Cooper | 3.41 | 5.18 | +1.77 |
| (England) James Birkinshaw | 3.78 | 4.92 | +1.24 |
| (England) James Cockle | 3.89 | 3.77 | -0.12 |

=== Season Facts ===
- Fastest Time Set at Owlerton in 2007 - 59.3s (NTR) by Chris Holder for Isle of Wight Islanders against Sheffield Tigers on 6 October (PL)
- Biggest Home Win - 66–26 against Workington Comets on 12 April (PT)
- Biggest Home Defeat - N/A (No Home Loss)
- Biggest Away Win - 53–41 against Somerset Rebels on 24 August (PL)
- Biggest Away Defeat - 15–75 against Kings Lynn Stars on 28 March (KOC)

== 2008 season ==
2008 Season Competitions
Premier League
- Position: 8th
- Qualified For: Young Shield

Premier League Jack Young Shield
- Position: Quarter-finals
- Lost To: Isle of Wight Islanders

Premier Trophy
- Position: Semi-Finalists
- Lost To: Birmingham Brummies

Premier League KOC
- Position: 2nd round
- Lost To: Isle of Wight Islanders

Premier League Fours
- Position: 5th
- Represented By: Andre Compton; Ricky Ashworth; Ben Wilson; Joel Parsons

Premier League Pairs
- Position: 4th
- Represented By: Andre Compton; Ricky Ashworth

Premier League Riders Championship
- Position: 13th
- Represented By: Andre Compton

=== Season Overview ===
The Tigers finished the 2008 Premier League campaign in 8th place. The Tigers started the season well in the Premier Trophy by qualifying for the semi-finals, and with away wins at Scunthorpe and Stoke. However, Sheffield went on to lose to Birmingham Brummies 90–94 on aggregate in the Premier Trophy semi-final. The Tigers' league form also suffered, and after finishing 8th in the Premier League, they were drawn against the Isle of Wight Islanders in the first round of the Young Shield, but lost 88–98. The Tigers lost Ricky Ashworth to injury for the last two months of the season and also captain Andre Compton announced his retirement at the end of the season, to end a disappointing campaign for the Tigers.

=== Team ===
| Rider | Opening CMA | Closing CMA | Change in CMA |
| (England) Andre Compton (C) | 9.79 | 8.70 | -1.09 |
| (England) Ricky Ashworth | 7.64 | 7.76 | +0.12 |
| (England) Ben Wilson | 6.71 | 6.60 | -0.11 |
| (Australia) Joel Parsons | 5.96 | 6.22 | +0.26 |
| (England) Paul Cooper | 5.05 | 5.65 | +0.60 |
| (England) Lee Smethills | 3.30 | 5.55 | +2.25 |
| (England) Kyle Hughes | 3.00 | 3.00 | No Change |

Also Rode

| (Australia) Sam Martin | 3.00 | 3.00 | No Change |

=== Season Facts ===
- Fastest Time Set at Owlerton in 2008 - 59.4s by Jason Bunyan at the P.L.R.C on 21 September
- Biggest Home Win - 65–27 against Mildenhall Fen Tigers on 3 July (PL)
- Biggest Home Defeat - 37–56 against Coventry Bees on 13 March (CH)
- Biggest Away Win - 65–27 against Mildenhall Fen Tigers on 6 July (PL)
- Biggest Away Defeat - 27–63 against Newcastle Diamonds on 30 March (PT)

== 2009 season ==
2009 Season Competitions
Premier League
- Position: 8th
- Qualified For: Young Shield

Premier League Jack Young Shield
- Position: Quarter-finals
- Lost To: Rye House Rockets

Premier Trophy
- Position: 5th in North Group
- KO Stages: DNQ

Premier League KOC
- Position: 1st round
- Lost To: Edinburgh Monarchs

Premier League Fours
- Position: DNQ

Premier League Pairs
- Position: DNQ

Premier League Riders Championship
- Position: Winner
- Represented By: Ricky Ashworth

The Tigers took part in the fewer of competitions in 2009. The Tigers participated in the Premier League, Premier Trophy and the Premier League Knock-Out Cup. The Tigers also qualified for the Jack Young Shield. However, due to lower averages around the time of qualification, the Tigers did not qualify to participate in the Premier League Pairs and Premier League Fours. During the Close Season, Sheffield decided to resign Ricky Ashworth, Joel Parsons and Paul Cooper from the Previous Season. Richard Hall, Josh Auty, Ritchie Hawkins and Chris Mills were signed from Scunthorpe Scorpions, Redcar Bears, Somerset Rebels and King's Lynn Stars respectively.

=== Season Overview ===
The Tigers finished the 2009 Premier League campaign in 8th place. The Tigers started the season poorly in the Premier Trophy by finishing 5th in the northern qualifying group, with the solitary away win at Newcastle. However, home losses against Glasgow Tigers and Redcar Bears stalled their progress. The Tigers' league campaign was also one of mediocracy as another 8th-place finish in which led to a Young Shield place against the Rye House Rockets. The Tigers lost the quarter-final match 92–93 on aggregate over the two legs in which the 2009 season came to a close. The one highlight of the season was home favourite Ricky Ashworth being crowned PLRC champion by beating off the tournament favourite Darcy Ward in the final. This was also the season when Ashworth broke the Owlerton track record trimming the time to 59.2 from 59.3 (Previous Holder: Chris Holder) against the Berwick Bandits on 21 May.

=== Team ===
| Rider | Opening CMA | Closing CMA | Change in CMA |
| (England) Ricky Ashworth (C) | 7.57 | 8.14 | +0.57 |
| (England) Richard Hall | 6.83 | 7.56 | +0.73 |
| (England) Josh Auty | 4.55 | 6.22 | +1.67 |
| (Australia) Joel Parsons | 6.06 | 5.28 | -0.78 |
| (Australia) Hugh Skidmore | 5.00 | 5.06 | +0.06 |
| (England) Chris Mills | 4.93 | 5.12 | +0.19 |
| (England) Scott Smith | 4.16 | 4.16 | No Change |

Also Rode

| (England) Ritchie Hawkins | 5.91 | 5.91 | No Change |
| (England) Paul Cooper | 5.51 | 4.67 | +0.57 |

=== Season Facts ===
- Fastest Time Set at Owlerton in 2009 - 59.2s (NTR) by Ricky Ashworth against Berwick Bandits on 21 May (PL)
- Biggest Home Win - 62–33 against Rye House Rockets on 30 July (PL)
- Biggest Home Defeat - 40–55 against Redcar Bears on 9 April (PT)
- Biggest Away Win - 50–39 against Newcastle Diamonds on 5 April (PT)
- Biggest Away Defeat - 29–63 against Berwick Bandits on 15 August (PL)

== 2010 season ==
2010 Season Competitions
Premier League
- Position: 4th
- Qualified For: Play Offs

Premier League Play Offs
- Position: Finalists
- Lost To: Newcastle Diamonds

Premier Trophy
- Position: 3rd in Midland Group
- KO Stages: DNQ

Premier League KOC
- Position: 1st round
- Lost To: Birmingham Brummies

Premier League Fours
- Position: 4th
- Represented By: Ricky Ashworth; Josef Franc; Richard Hall; Simon Lambert

Premier League Pairs
- Position: Winners
- Represented By: Ricky Ashworth; Josh Auty

Premier League Riders Championship
- Position: 5th
- Represented By: Josh Auty

The Tigers took part in the majority of competitions in 2010. The Tigers participated in the Premier League, Premier Trophy and the Premier League Knock-Out Cup. The Tigers also qualified to participate in the Premier League Pairs and Premier League Fours. During the Close Season, Sheffield decided to resign Ricky Ashworth, Josh Auty, Richard Hall, Hugh Skidmore and Paul Cooper from the Previous Season. Josef Franc and Arlo Bugeja were signed from Berwick and Redcar respectively.

=== Season Overview ===
The 2010 season saw the Tigers return to a successful season after a couple of seasons of mediocracy. The Tigers finished the 2010 Premier League campaign in 4th place and thus qualifying for the Premier League Play-Offs. The Tigers started the season poorly in the Premier Trophy by finishing 3rd in the midland qualifying group, with the solitary away win at Redcar. However, a home loss against Birmingham was enough to condemn the Tigers to Premier Trophy Elimination. The Tigers league campaign started off slowly but fired into life on the May Bank Holiday Weekend, with 3 wins (1 Home, 2 Away) in 3 days. The win at the Premier League Pairs by Ricky Ashworth & Josh Auty was a boost in the Tigers confidence, as well as the first team silverware since 2002. The Tigers may have stalled at home against Edinburgh Monarchs and Newcastle Diamonds (Who finished 1st and 2nd Respectively) but with 5 away wins (3rd most in the league) at Redcar, Workington, Stoke, Scunthorpe and Glasgow, the Tigers finished the season in 4th place, qualifying for the play-offs. The Edinburgh Monarchs elected to play the Tigers in the semi-finals confident of gaining a result after home and away wins against the Tigers during the PL campaign. After taking a 59–31 to Owlerton, Sheffield pulled off one of the shocks and results of the season by overturning the 28 points deficit by winning at Owlerton 61-31 (92-90 Aggregate Score). This result enabled the Tigers to take on the Newcastle in the play-off final for a chance to have a crack at the Ipswich Witches in a promotion/relegation battle. However, although Sheffield overcame Newcastle 53–43 at Owlerton (And Ricky Ashworth once again broke the Owlerton Track Record from 59.2 to 59.1), the Diamonds romped to victory at Brough Park 58-36 (101-89 Agg) and effectively ended the Tigers season.

=== Team ===
| Rider | Opening CMA | Closing CMA | Change in CMA |
| (England) Ricky Ashworth | 7.94 | 8.09 | +0.15 |
| (England) Josh Auty | 6.07 | 7.78 | +1.71 |
| (England) Richard Hall | 7.37 | 7.02 | -0.35 |
| (Czech Republic) Josef Franc | 7.84 | 6.81 | -1.03 |
| (Australia) Hugh Skidmore | 5.06 | 5.63 | +0.57 |
| (England) Paul Cooper (C) | 4.56 | 5.12 | +0.56 |
| (England) Simon Lambert | 3.42 | 3.35 | -0.07 |

Also Rode

| (Australia) Arlo Bugeja | 3.00 | 3.00 | No Change |

=== Season Facts ===
- Fastest Time Set at Owlerton in 2010 - 59.1s (NTR) by Ricky Ashworth against Newcastle Diamonds on 15 October (PO FINAL)
- Biggest Home Win - 67–25 against Redcar Bears on 27 May (PT)
- Biggest Home Defeat - 36–54 against Birmingham Brummies on 13 May (KOC)
- Biggest Away Win - 51–41 against Scunthorpe Scorpions on 30 August (PT)
- Biggest Away Defeat - 25–63 against Birmingham Brummies on 5 May (KOC)

== 2011 season ==
The 2011 season was the 15th consecutive season that the Tigers have competed in the Premier League.

=== 2011 Team ===
| Rider | Opening CMA | Closing CMA | Change in CMA | Other Information |
|---|---|---|---|---|
| (Australia) Shane Parker | 7.95 | | | Sheffield Asset. Hasn't Previously ridden for Tigers. |
| (United Kingdom) Ricky Ashworth | 7.77 | | | Resigned for Tigers |
| (United Kingdom) Josh Auty | 7.52 | | | Resigned for Tigers |
| (Argentina) Emiliano Sanchez | 6.64 | | | Sheffield Asset. Recalled for 2011. |
| (Australia) Hugh Skidmore | 5.69 | | | Resigned for Tigers |
| (United Kingdom) Simon Lambert | 3.47 | | | Resigned for Tigers |
| (United Kingdom) Ashley Birks | 3.00 | | | Signed for Tigers from Scunthorpe. |

== 2012 season ==
In 2012 Tigers finished in 12th place.

== 2017 season ==
=== Team ===
- Josh Grajczonek 8.90
- Kyle Howarth 7.18
- Lasse Bjerre 6.64
- Todd Kurtz 5.76
- Josh Bates 4.89
- Jan Graversen 4.13
- Georgie Wood 2.00 (assessed)

Also Rode:

- Jack Parkinson Blackburn 2.00 (assessed)
- Nathan Stoneman 2.00 (assessed)
- Robert Branford 4.00

== 2022 season ==
=== Sheffield Tigers ===
- (United Kingdom) Craig Cook
- (United Kingdom) Adam Ellis
- (Australia) Jack Holder
- (United Kingdom) Kyle Howarth (C)
- (Poland) Tobiasz Musielak
- (United Kingdom) Stefan Nielsen
- (United Kingdom) Connor Mountain (Rising Star)
- (United Kingdom) Dan Thompson (Number 8)
