= 2014 National League speedway season =

British motorcycle speedway season

- League: National League
- Champions: Cradley Heathens
- Knockout Cup: Cradley Heathens
- Individual: Danny Halsey
- Pairs: Stoke Potters
- Fours: Cradley Heathens
- Division/s above: 2014 Elite League; 2014 Premier League

The 2014 season of the National League, the third tier of British speedway was contested by nine teams. The Cradley Heathens won the title. The Isle of Wight Islanders were missing from 2012, and the Scunthorpe Stags and Devon Demons have joined the league.

== Final table ==
Pos	Team	PL	W	D	L	Pts
1	Cradley Heathens	16	15	0	1	51
2	Coventry Storm	15	11	0	4	35
3	Kent Kings	16	10	1	5	34
4	Mildenhall Fen Tigers	15	10	0	5	32
5	King's Lynn Young Stars	16	8	1	7	30
6	Stoke Potters	15	8	0	7	25
7	Devon Demons	13	3	0	10	10
8	Buxton Hitmen	16	2	0	14	7
9	Scunthorpe Stags	16	1	0	15	2

PL = Matches; W = Wins; D = Draws; L = Losses; Pts = Total Points

SCORING SYSTEM Home loss by any number of points = 0 Home draw = 1 Home win by between 1 and 6 points = 2 Home win by 7 points or more = 3 Away loss by 7 points or more = 0 Away loss by 6 points or less = 1 Away draw = 2 Away win by between 1 and 6 points = 3 Away win by 7 points or more = 4

== Fixtures & results ==
Home \ Away	BUX	COV	CH	DEV	KK	KL	MIL	SCU	STO
Buxton Hitmen		43–46	36–53	52–41	32–56	39–53	39–55	51–40	30–64
Coventry Storm	65–27		46–43	41–22	54–39	47–37	42–47	71–18	55–37
Cradley Heathens	71–19	57–35		63–30	65–27	64–24	55–31	72–18	64–30
Devon Demons	50–43	–	36–54		40–49	38–56	–	56–28	–
Kent Kings	57–37	53–37	37–41	64–28		45–45	48–40	69–23	56–36
King's Lynn Young Stars	62–31	38–52	29–64	59–36	44–46		51–39	71–19	45–47
Mildenhall Fen Tigers	57–36	42–48	40–50	60–33	54–39	55–38		63–30	64–29
Scunthorpe Stags	47–43	26–64	21–68	29–61	21–62	19–71	29–63		41–48
Stoke Potters	59–34	45–44	43–47	60–32	55–36	42–50	54–39	66–25	

Legend: Blue = home team win; Yellow = draw; Red = away team win.

== Play Offs ==
Top four teams race off in two-legged semi-finals and final to decide the championship. Cradley Heathens defeated Coventry Storm in the final.

Semi-finals

Date	Team one	Score	Team two
05/10	Mildenhall	41-48	Cradley
03/10	Coventry	54-39	Kent
30/09	Cradley	68-27	Mildenhall
22/09	Kent	49-44	Coventry

=== Final ===
21 October	Cradley Heathens; Paul Starke 13; Max Clegg 11; Matt Williamson 9 Tom Perry 8 Steve Worrall 5 Danny Phillips 4 Nathan Greaves 2	52–42	Coventry Storm; James Sarjeant 14; Stefan Nielsen 9 Simon Lambert (guest) 8 Martin Knuckey 6 Dan Greenwood 4 Ryan Terry-Daley 1 Luke Priest 0	Monmore Green Stadium

31 October	Coventry Storm; James Sarjeant 14; Dan Greenwood 12; Simon Lambert (guest) 7 Stefan Nielsen 3 Luke Priest 3 Martin Knuckey 3 Ryan Terry-Daley 2	44–46	Cradley Heathens; Max Clegg 11; Paul Starke 10; Nathan Greaves 9 Danny Phillips 6 Tom Perry 5 Steve Worrall 4 Matt Williamson 1	Beaumont Park Stadium

== Final Leading averages ==
Rider	Team	Average
Lewis Rose	Kings Lynn	10.82
Steve Worrall	Cradley	10.46
Paul Starke	Cradley	9.75

== National League Knockout Cup ==
The 2014 National League Knockout Cup was the 17th edition of the Knockout Cup for tier three teams. Cradley Heathens were the winners for the second successive year.

First round

Date	Team one	Score	Team two
19/05	Kent	56-36	Devon
15/03	Devon	38-51	Kent

Quarter-finals

Date	Team one	Score	Team two
25/07	Coventry	60-34	Buxton
29/06	Buxton	40-55	Coventry
24/06	Cradley	59-33	Mildenhall
23/06	Kent	50-40	Stoke
18/05	Mildenhall	39-49	Cradley Heath
05/07	Stoke	58-32	Kent
06/04	Scunthorpe	37-56	Kings Lynn
02/04	King's Lynn	67-24	Scunthorpe

Semi-finals

Date	Team one	Score	Team two
27/09	Stoke	49-40	Kings Lynn
17/09/	Kings Lynn	54-39	Stoke
26/09	Coventry	27-32	Cradley Heath
09/09	Cradley Heath	63-28	Coventry

=== Final ===
22 October	King's Lynn Young Stars; James Cockle 14; Simon Lambert (guest) 11; Scott Campus 8 Tom Stokes 7 Marc Owen 2 Josh Bailey 1 Darren Mallett R/R	43–47	Cradley Heathens; Paul Starke 13; Max Clegg 11; Matt Williamson 9 Tom Perry 8 Steve Worrall 5 Danny Phillips 4 Nathan Greaves 2	King's Lynn Stadium

28 October	Cradley Heathens; Max Clegg 11; Paul Starke 9 Tom Perry 6 Nathan Greaves 6 Matt Williamson 4 Danny Phillips 3 Steve Worrall R/R	39–22	King's Lynn Young Stars; Ben Morley 8 James Cockle 5 Josh Bailey 4 Marc Owen 3 Tom Stokes 2 Layne Cupitt 0 Darren Mallett R/R	Monmore Green Stadium

== Riders' Championship ==
Danny Halsey won the Riders' Championship. The final was held on 28 September at Rye House Stadium.

Pos.	Rider	Team	Total
1	Danny Halsey	Mildenhall	14
2	Steve Worrall	Cradley	13
3	Ben Morley	Kent	12+3
4	Joe Jacobs	Mildenhall	12+2
5	Jon Armstrong	Stoke	9
6	Dan Greenwood	Coventry	8
7	Marc Owen	King's Lynn	7
8	James Cockle	King's Lynn	7
9	Luke Chessell	Stoke	6
10	James Sarjeant	Coventry	6
11	Paul Starke	Cradley	6
12	Max Clegg	Cradley	6
13	Ben Hopwood	Stoke	5
14	Tom Woolley	Buxton	3
15	Danno Verge (res)	Scunthorpe	3
16	Arron Mogridge	Scunthorpe	2
17	Benji Compton	Kent	0

== Pairs ==
The National League Pairs Championship, was held at Mildenhall Stadium, on 15 June 2014. The event was won by Ben Wilson and Jon Armstrong of the Stoke Potters.

Group A
Pos	Team	Pts	Riders
1	Stoke	21	Wilson 12, Armstrong 9
2	Buxton	16	Carr 8, Atkin 8
3	King's Lynn	9	Owen 7, Campos 2
4	Coventry	8	Terry-Daley 4, Crang 4

Group B
Pos	Team	Pts	Riders
1	Mildenhall	18	Halsey 9, Jacobs 9
2	Cradley	15	Worrall S 11, Clegg 4
3	Kent	15	Lambert 10, Morley 5
4	Devon	6	Shanes 4, Andrews 2

Final
Pos	Team	Pts	Riders
1	Stoke	17	Armstrong 9, Wilson 8
2	Mildenhall	16	Jacobs 12, Halsey 4
3	Kent	12	Lambert 9, Morley 3
4	Buxton	8	Carr 5, Atkin 4

== Fours ==
Cradley won the National League Fours, held on 26 October 2014 at Brandon Stadium.

Group A
Pos	Team	Pts	Riders
1	Coventry	18	Nielsen 6, Sarjeant 5, Greenwood 4, Priest 3
2	Cradley	13	Starke 5, Greaves 4, Clegg 3, Perry 1
3	Kent	12	Morley 5, Ayres 3, Lambert 3, Baseby 1
4	Buxton	5	Atkin 2, Blacklock 2, Woolley 1, Extance 0

Group B
Pos	Team	Pts	Riders
1	Mildenhall	15	Bates 6, Johnson 5, Kingston 4, Phillips 0
2	King's Lynn	15	Cockle 5, Owen 5, Stokes 5, Terry-Daley 0
3	Stoke	12	Armstrong 6, Hopwood 3, Shuttleworth 2, Widman 1
4	Devon	4	Andrews 2, Shanes 1, Chessell 1, Govier 0

Final
Pos	Team	Pts	Riders
1	Cradley	18	Clegg 6, Greaves 6, Starke 6 Perry 0
2	Coventry	11	Sarjeant 4, Nielsen 3, Priest 2, Greenwood 2
3	Mildenhall	11	Bates 4, Johnson 3, Kingston 3, Phillips 1
4	King's Lynn	8	Cockle 4, Owen 2, Terry-Daley 2, Stokes 0

== Teams and final averages ==
Buxton Hitmen

- Tony Atkin 8.14
- Liam Carr 8.00
- Adam Extance 5.08
- Ryan Blacklock 4.55
- Tom Woolley 4.11
- Sean Phillips 3.00
- Stefan Farnaby 3.00

Coventry Storm

- Oliver Greenwood 9.22
- James Sarjeant 8.67
- Stefan Nielsen 8.38
- Luke Crang 7.37
- Dan Greenwood 7.27
- Luke Priest 6.37
- Ryan Terry-Daley 4.68
- Martin Knuckey 4.55

Cradley Heathens

- Steve Worrall 10.46
- Paul Starke 9.75
- Max Clegg 8.58
- Tom Perry 8.21
- Nathan Greaves 7.12
- Matt Williamson 6.60
- Dan Phillips 4.98

Devon Demons

- Tim Webster 8.74
- Ben Reade 7.70
- Matt Bates 6.27
- James Shanes 6.14
- Lee Smart 5.76
- Luke Chessell 5.62
- Richard Andrews 4.41
- Danny Stoneman 4.20
- Tyler Govier 3.00

Kent Kings

- Simon Lambert 9.14
- Ben Morley 9.06
- Benji Compton 8.95
- David Mason 7.38
- Aaron Baseby 6.58
- Danny Ayres 4.47
- Daniel Blake 3.40
- Brandon Freemantle 3.00
- Jason Garrad 3.00

=== King's Lynn Young Stars ===
- Lewis Rose 10.82
- Darren Mallett 7.40
- James Cockle 7.32
- Tom Stokes 6.95
- Kyle Hughes 6.22
- Marc Owen 6.11
- Scott Campos 5.53
- Josh Bailey 4.07

Mildenhall Fen Tigers

- Danny Halsey 9.23
- Joe Jacobs 8.63
- Josh Bates 7.68
- Connor Coles 6.65
- Brendan Johnson 6.21
- Connor Mountain 5.54
- Jack Kingston 4.90

Scunthorpe Stags

- Sam Chapman 5.45
- Steven Jones 4.90
- Arron Mogridge 4.36
- Danno Verge 3.57
- Reece Downs 3.33
- Liam Sanderson 3.00
- Ryan MacDonald 3.00
- Michael Neale 3.00

Stoke Potters

- Ben Wilson 9.04
- Jon Armstrong 7.94
- Ben Hopwood 7.28
- Lee Payne 7.10
- Chris Widman 4.81
- Rob Shuttleworth 3.75
- Adam Kirby 3.68
- James McBain 3.00

== Development Leagues ==
=== Midland Development League ===
Pos	team	P	W	D	L	Pts
1	Milton Keynes	17	15	0	2	30
2	Rye House	16	11	1	4	23
3	Belle Vue	17	10	1	4	21
4	Castleford	17	10	0	7	20
5	Stoke	16	9	0	7	18
6	King's Lynn	18	8	1	9	17
7	Coventry	14	7	0	7	14
8	Long Eaton	17	5	1	11	11
9	Sheffield	16	2	1	13	5
10	Buxton	16	1	3	12	5

=== Northern Junior League ===
Pos	team	P	W	D	L	Pts
1	Castleford	8	5	1	2	11
2	Berwick	8	3	4	1	10
3	Workington	8	4	1	3	9
4	Northside	8	3	1	4	7
5	Redcar	8	1	1	6	3

== See also ==
- List of United Kingdom Speedway League Champions
- Knockout Cup (speedway)
