= 2010 National League speedway season =

British motorcycle speedway season

- League: National League
- Champions: Buxton Hitmen
- Knockout Cup: Buxton Hitmen
- Individual: Lee Smart
- Pairs: Plymouth Devils
- National Trophy: Buxton Hitmen
- Division/s above: 2010 Elite League; 2010 Premier League

The 2010 season of the National League, the third tier of British speedway, was contested by ten teams. Buxton Hitmen beat Newport Hornets in the play-off final to become champions.

== Final table ==
Pos	Team	PL	W	D	L	BP	Pts
1	Dudley Heathens	18	13	0	5	19	45
2	Buxton Hitmen	18	14	0	4	17	45
3	Newport Hornets	18	13	0	5	19	45
4	Rye House Cobras	18	10	0	8	11	31
5	Bournemouth Buccaneers	18	10	1	7	9	30
6	Plymouth Devils	18	9	0	9	9	27
7	Isle of Wight Islanders	18	6	0	12	6	18
8	Scunthorpe Saints	18	5	1	12	4	15
9	King's Lynn Young Stars	18	5	0	13	4	14
10	Weymouth Wildcats	18	4	0	14	5	13

PL = Matches; W = Wins; D = Draws; L = Losses; BP = Bonus Pts Pts = Total Points

Mildenhall Fen Tigers withdrew - record expunged

== Fixtures & results ==
Home \ Away	BB	BUX	DH	IOW	KL	MIL	NEW	PD
Bournemouth Buccaneers		49–41	50–45	54–39	47–43	–	47–46	55–40
Buxton Hitmen	50–43		47–45	64–27	55–39	–	49–36	56–34
Dudley Heathens	51–41	49–41		60–33	63–32	44–46	58–33	54–41
Isle of Wight Islanders	60–32	41–52	44–49		56–39	41–49	41–54	52–41
King's Lynn Young Stars	45–44	32–39	41–49	61–32		39–53	56–35	41–49
Mildenhall Fen Tigers	53–37	–	–	55–40	43–50		–	60–33
Newport Hornets	56–34	44–46	59–34	51–23	58–35	56–33		54–41
Plymouth Devils	49–41	59–35	49–43	56–33	59–36	–	41–48	

Legend: Blue = home team win; Yellow = draw; Red = away team win.

== Play Offs ==
Top four teams race off in two-legged semi-finals and final to decide championship. The winner was Buxton Hitmen who defeated the Newport Hornets in the final.

Semi-finals

Date	Team one	Score	Team two
05/10	Dudley	40-50	Buxton
06/10	Bournemouth	38-49	Newport
17/10	Buxton	49-43	Dudley
17/10	Newport	45-41	Bournemouth

=== Final ===
29 October	Newport Hornets	0–0+	Buxton Hitmen	Hayley Stadium

+ not held

31 October	Buxton Hitmen; Robert Branford 14; Craig Cook 12; Jason Garrity 9 Richie Worrall (guest) 8 Adam Allott 7 Lewis Dallaway 6 Nick Morris R/R	46–35	Newport Hornets; Steve Worrall (guest) 11; Tony Atkin 9 Kyle Newman 7 Tom Young 4 Luke Priest 4 Rhys Naylor (guest) 0 Tim Webster R/R	Buxton Raceway

== National League Knockout Cup ==
The 2010 National League Knockout Cup was the 13th edition of the Knockout Cup for tier three teams. Buxton Hitmen were the winners.

First round

Team one	Team two	First Leg	Second Leg	Aggregate
Buxton	Mildenhall	58-37	49-41	107-78
Isle of Wight	Weymouth	51-39	36-58	87-97
Newport	Plymouth	42-29	57-35	99-64

Quarter-finals

Team one	Team two	First Leg	Second Leg	Aggregate
Rye House	Buxton	38-51	29-63	67–114
Weymouth	Newport	41-49	35-53	76–102
King's Lynn	Bournemouth	52-39	50-40	102–79
Scunthorpe	Dudley	44-46	60-32	104-78

Semi-finals

Team one	Team two	First Leg	Second Leg	Aggregate
King's Lynn	Newport	54-39	50-40	104-79
Dudley	Buxton	43-47	48-45	91–92

Final

24 October	Buxton Hitmen; Jason Garrity 19; Robert Branford 11; Jay Herne (guest) 10; Adam Allott 9 Richie Worrall 5 Lewis Dallaway 4 Jonathon Bethell 0 Nick Morris R/R	58–35	King's Lynn Young Stars; Darren Mallett 15; Simon Lambert 6 Adam Lowe 4 Oliver Rayson 3 Cal McDade 3 Jake Knight 2 Lewis Kerr 1	Buxton Raceway

27 October	King's Lynn Young Stars; Simon Lambert 12; Darren Mallett 9 Jake Knight 7 Adam Lowe 7 Olly Rayson 6 Cal McDade 3 Lewis Kerr 2	46–44	Buxton Hitmen; Robert Branford 13; Adam Allott 12; Craig Cook 9 Richie Worrall 6 Jason Garrity 3 Lewis Dallaway 1 Nick Morris R/R	King's Lynn Stadium

== National Trophy ==
Pos	Team	P	W	D	L	Pts
1	Buxton	8	6	0	2	12
2	Newport	8	5	0	3	10
3	Isle of Wight	8	5	0	3	10
4	Plymouth	8	2	0	6	4
5	Isle of Wight	8	2	0	6	4

Home \ Away	BUX	IOW	NEW	PLY	WEY
Buxton		51–41	50–38	56–40	54–38
Isle of Wight	50–42		53–39	56–39	50–43
Newport	37–55	53–39		49–41	58–36
Plymouth	57–36	43–47	44–46		48–44
Weymouth	41–53	47–39	34–60	43–31	

Legend: Blue = home team win; Yellow = draw; Red = away team win.

== Riders' Championship ==
Lee Smart won the Riders' Championship. The final was held on 30 October at Rye House Stadium.

Pos.	Rider	Team	Total
1	Lee Smart	Dudley	14
2	Simon Lambert	King's Lynn	12
3	Adam Allott	Buxton	11
4	Craig Cook	Buxton	10
5	Nick Simmons	Isle of Wight	9
6	Ben Morley	Rye House	9
7	Barrie Evans	Dudley	8
8	Jay Herne	Bournemouth	7
9	Kyle Newman	Newport	7
10	Danny Warwick	Isle of Wight	6
11	James Cockle	Weymouth	6
12	Gary Cottham	Weymouth	5
13	Darren Mallett	King's Lynn	5
14	Gary Irving	Scunthorpe	5
15	Mark Baseby	Bournemouth	4
16	Joe Jacobs	Rye House	2
17	Lee Strudwick (res)	Rye House	0

== Pairs ==
The National League Pairs Championship, was held at Hayley Stadium, on 7 August 2010. The event was won by Nicki Glanz and Mark Simmonds of the Plymouth Devils.

Group A
Pos	Team	Pts	Riders
1	Plymouth	24	Glanz 14, Simmonds 10
2	Bournemouth	17	Howarth 9, Brundle 8
3	Newport	17	Kurtz 13, Atkin 6
4	Dudley	16	Anderson 11, Dyer 5
5	Isle of Wight	14	Simmons 9, Warwick 5

Group B
Pos	Team	Pts	Riders
1	King's Lynn	23	Lambert 16, Lowe 7
2	Buxton	21	Allott 15, Branford 6
3	Weymouth	20	Cockle 12, Bekker 8
4	Scunthorpe	17	Worrall S 10, Birks 7
5	Rye House	9	Jacobs 6, Hazelden 3

Final

- Plymouth bt King's Lynn 7–2

== Fours ==
The National League Fours, held on 6 June 2010 at Mildenhall Stadium was abandoned due to rain and was not restaged.

== Teams and final averages ==
Bournemouth

- Jay Herne 10.16
- James Brundle 8.97
- Mark Baseby 6.93
- Kyle Howarth 6.61
- James Sarjeant 3.91
- Nick Lawrence 3.00
- Danny Stoneman 3.00

Buxton

- Craig Cook 10.64
- Adam Allott 7.42
- Nick Morris 6.90
- Robert Branford 6.60
- Jonathan Bethell 6.44
- Jason Garrity 5.16
- Lewis Dallaway 4.35

Dudley

- Lee Smart 9.50
- Barrie Evans 7.84
- Micky Dyer 6.97
- Jake Anderson 7.02
- Tom Perry 6.56
- Richard Franklin 5.39
- Ashley Morris 5.25

Isle Of Wight

- Paul Starke 8.06
- Nick Simmons 8.05
- Danny Warwick 7.41
- Lee Smethills 5.70
- Dean Felton 5.01
- John Resch 4.29
- Tom Hill 3.38
- Danny Hodgson 3.00

King's Lynn

- Simon Lambert 9.12
- Darren Mallett 7.52
- Adam Lowe 5.75
- Oliver Rayson 5.37
- Lewis Kerr 5.33
- Cal McDade 5.08
- Scott Campos 4.82
- Jake Knight 3.00

Newport

- Todd Kurtz 9.01
- Kyle Newman 8.18
- Tony Atkin 7.78
- Tim Webster 6.68
- Luke Priest 6.08
- James White Williams 4.96
- Tom Young 4.62

Plymouth

- Nicki Glanz 9.70
- Mark Simmonds 8.96
- Seemond Stephens 8.79
- Matt Bates 4.47
- Jaimie Pickard 4.35
- Ross Walter 3.00
- Ben Reade 3.00
- Bob Charles 3.00

Rye House

- Kyle Hughes 8.86
- Marc Owen 6.92
- Joe Jacobs 6.53
- Lee Strudwick 6.29
- David Mason 5.50
- Ben Morley 4.65
- Shane Hazelden 4.39
- Tom Stokes 3.00

Scunthorpe

- Mark Burrows 6.76
- Benji Compton 6.28
- Gary Irving 6.25
- Steve Worrall 5.74
- Scott Richardson 5.16
- Ashley Birks 4.92
- Adam Wrathall 4.31
- Luke Chessell 3.42

Weymouth

- James Cockle 7.46
- Tom Brown 6.20
- Adam McKinna 6.15
- Karl Mason 5.85
- Brendan Johnson 4.31
- Gary Cottham 4.24
- Richard Andrews 3.00
- Luke Wiltshire 3.00

== See also ==
- List of United Kingdom Speedway League Champions
