= 2012 National League speedway season =

British motorcycle speedway season

- League: National League
- Champions: Mildenhall Fen Tigers
- Knockout Cup: Mildenhall Fen Tigers
- Individual: Ashley Birks
- Pairs: Mildenhall Fen Tigers
- Fours: Mildenhall Fen Tigers
- Division/s above: 2012 Elite League; 2012 Premier League

The 2012 season of the National League was the third tier/division of British speedway and was contested by eight teams.

== Summary ==
Newport and Belle Vue did not return from 2011, and Hackney opted to run at Rye House only, renaming the team Rye House Raiders.

Mildenhall Fen Tigers beat Dudley Heathens in the play-off final to become champions.

== Final table ==
Pos	Team	PL	W	D	L	Pts
1	Dudley Heathens	14	13	0	1	42
2	Mildenhall Fen Tigers	14	10	2	2	38
3	Isle of Wight Islanders	14	7	0	7	21
4	Stoke Potters	14	6	1	7	20
5	Rye House Raiders	14	6	0	8	20
6	Scunthorpe Saints	14	6	0	8	17
7	Buxton Hitmen	14	3	1	10	11
8	King's Lynn Young Stars	14	3	0	11	9

PL = Matches; W = Wins; D = Draws; L = Losses; Pts = Total Points

SCORING SYSTEM Home loss by any number of points = 0 Home draw = 1 Home win by between 1 and 6 points = 2 Home win by 7 points or more = 3 Away loss by 7 points or more = 0 Away loss by 6 points or less = 1 Away draw = 2 Away win by between 1 and 6 points = 3 Away win by 7 points or more = 4

== Fixtures & results ==
Home \ Away	BUX	DH	IOW	KL	MIL	RYE	SCU	STO
Buxton Hitmen		27–65	40–50	56–37	43–43	60–33	43–46	50–38
Dudley Heathens	69–23		68–22	66–24	54–40	55–16	58–33	58–35
Isle of Wight Islanders	49–44	29–61		53–40	41–49	51–42	55–37	48–42
King's Lynn Young Stars	50–43	42–47	40–50		38–54	52–42	49–46	42–48
Mildenhall Fen Tigers	53–40	53–36	63–30	55–36		49–38	62–29	45–47
Rye House Raiders	53–42	38–53	50–40	51–39	40–50		52–39	49–41
Scunthorpe Saints	44–36	43–46	50–40	48–42	35–56	47–44		50–43
Stoke Potters	56–39	43–47	58–37	53–36	45–45	41–48	57–37	

Legend: Blue = home team win; Yellow = draw; Red = away team win.

== Play Offs ==
Top four teams race off in two-legged semi-finals and final to decide championship. Mildenhall Fen Tigers defeated Dudley Heathens in the final.

Semi-finals

Date	Team one	Score	Team two
30/09	Mildenhall	58-36	Isle of Wight
16/10	Isle of Wight	45-44	Mildenhall
09/10	Dudley	44-43	Stoke
10/10	Stoke	41-54	Dudley

=== Final ===
23 October	Dudley Heathens; Ashley Morris 15; Darryl Ritchings 14; Adam Roynon 12; James White-Williams 6 Daniel Greenwood 5 Tom Perry 0 Byron Bekker R/R	51–37	Mildenhall Fen Tigers; Joe Jacobs 13; Jason Garrity 8 Daniel Halsey 7 Stefan Nielsen 7 Josh Bates 5 Ryan Terry-Daley 5 Lewis Blackbird R/R	Monmore Green Stadium

24 October	Mildenhall Fen Tigers; Joe Jacobs 11; Lewis Blackbird 9 Stefan Nielsen 9 Josh Bates 8 Daniel Halsey 8 Jason Garrity 7 Ryan Terry-Daley 3	54–39	Dudley Heathens; Adam Roynon 16; Ashley Morris 8 Darryl Ritchings 7 Daniel Greenwood 6 James White-Williams 3 Adam Kirby 3 Sean Phillips 0 Tom Perry R/R	Mildenhall Stadium

== Final Leading averages ==
Rider	Team	Average
Adam Roynton	Dudley	11.64
Tom Perry	Dudley	9.88
Ashley Birks	Stoke	9.66

== National League Knockout Cup ==
The 2012 National League Knockout Cup was the 15th edition of the Knockout Cup for tier three teams. Mildenhall Fen Tigers were the winners for the second successive year.

First round

Date	Team one	Score	Team two
13/05	Stoke	49-40	Scunthorpe Saints
08/05	Dudley	65-28	Buxton
07/05	Scunthorpe Saints	47-42	Stoke
06/05	Buxton	36-54	Dudley
02/05	King's Lynn	39-51	Mildenhall
01/05	Isle Of Wight	58-31	Rye House Raiders
15/04	Mildenhall	55-40	King's Lynn
06/04	Rye House Raiders	49-46	Isle Of Wight

Semi-finals

Date	Team one	Score	Team two
15/09	Stoke	44-50	Mildenhall
27/08	Mildenhall	55-39	Stoke
09/08	Isle of Wight	15-21	Dudley
12/06	Dudley	60-32	Isle Of Wight

=== Final ===
7 October	Mildenhall Fen Tigers; Jason Garrity 14; Joe Jacobs 14; Daniel Halsey 11; Josh Bates 10; Stefan Nielsen 7 Ryan Terry-Daley 5 Lewis Blackbird r/r	61–33	Dudley Heathens; Joe Haines 13; Tom Perry 10; Darryl Ritchings 5 Daniel Greenwood 3 James White-Williams 2 Byron Bekker 0 Ashley Morris r/r	Mildenhall Stadium

23 October	Dudley Heathens; Adam Roynon 12; Ashley Morris 11; James White-Williams 9 Darryl Ritchings 7 Sean Phillips 1 Daniel Greenwood 1 Tom Perry r/r	41–32	Mildenhall Fen Tigers; Joe Jacobs 13; Josh Bates 6 Stefan Nielsen 4 Jason Garrity 4 Daniel Halsey 3 Ryan Terry-Daley 2 Lewis Blackbird r/r	Monmore Green Stadium

== Riders' Championship ==
Ashley Birks won the Riders' Championship. The final was held on 29 September at Rye House Stadium.

Pos.	Rider	Team	Total
1	Ashley Birks	Stoke	14+3
2	Jason Garrity	Rye House	14+2
3	Gary Irving	Scunthorpe	13
4	Tom Perry	Dudley	11
5	Charles Wright	Buxton	8
6	Lewis Kerr	Kings Lynn	8
7	Lewis Blackbird	Mildenhall	8
8	Stefan Nielsen	Mildenhall	7
9	James Sarjeant	Rye House	6
10	Ben Morley	Rye House	5
11	Ashley Morris	Dudley	5
12	Ben Reade	Stoke	5
13	Danny Warwick	Isle of Wight	4
14	Ben Hopwood	Isle of Wight	4
15	Adam Mckinna	Buxton	4
16	Joe Jacobs	Mildenhall	3

== Pairs ==
The National League Pairs Championship, was held at Mildenhall Stadium, on 22 July 2012. The event was won by Cameron Heeps and Lewis Blackbird of the Mildenhall Fen Tigers.

Group A
Pos	Team	Pts	Riders
1	Mildenhall	20	Blackbird 11, Heeps 9
2	Buxton	17	Wright 10, Branford 7
3	Isle of Wight	11	Warwick 6, Hughes 5
4	Rye House	6	Morley 4, Sarjeant 2

Group B
Pos	Team	Pts	Riders
1	Scunthorpe	20	Irving 12, Young 8
2	Dudley	13	Bekker 9, Perry 4
3	King's Lynn	12	Kerr 10, Cockle 2
4	Stoke	9	Lambert 9, Reade 0

Final
Pos	Team	Pts	Riders
1	Mildenhall	20	Heeps 11, Blackbird 6
2	Buxton	14	Branford 8, Wright 6
3	Dudley	12	Perry 10, Bekker 2
4	Scunthorpe	11	Irving 8, Young 3

== Fours ==
Mildenhall won the National League Fours, held on 26 August 2012 at Loomer Road Stadium.

Group A
Pos	Team	Pts	Riders
1	Dudley	21	Roynon 6, Morris 6, Ritchings 5, Bekker 4
2	Stoke	13	Birks 5, Cockle 5, Atkin 2, Carr 1
3	Rye House	9	Morley 4, Sarjeant 3, Chessell 2, Coles 0
4	Isle of Wight	5	Starke 2, Stoneman 2, Walter 1, Hopwood 0

Group B
Pos	Team	Pts	Riders
1	Mildenhall	23	Blackbird 6, Nielsen 6, Jacobs 6, Halsey 5
2	Buxton	12	Wright 5, McKinna 4, Felton 2, Priest 1
3	King's Lynn	6	Kerr 3, Knight 2, Stokes 1, Johnson 0
4	Scunthorpe	5	Greenwood 3, Phillips 2, Fenwick 0, Young 0

Final
Pos	Team	Pts	Riders
1	Mildenhall	17	Nielsen 6, Jacobs 6, Halsey 3, Blackbird 2
2	Buxton	13	Wright 4, Priest 4, Felton 3, McKinna 2
3	Dudley	10	Morris 5, Roynon 2, Ritchings 2, Bekker 1
4	Stoke	7	Birks 3, Cockle 2, Atkin 1, Carr 1

== Teams and averages ==
Buxton Hitmen

- Charles Wright 8.53
- Robert Branford 7.54
- Adam McKinna 6.74
- Dean Felton 5.77
- Luke Priest 5.67
- Ryan Blacklock 3.51
- Chris Widman 3.49

Dudley Heathens

- Adam Roynon 11.64
- Tom Perry 9.88
- Ashley Morris 8.51
- Byron Bekker 7.44
- Dan Greenwood 5.90
- Darryl Ritchings 5.84
- James White-Williams 4.88

Isle of Wight Islanders

- Danny Warwick 7.01
- Ben Hopwood 6.16
- Paul Starke 5.70
- Mark Baseby 5.67
- Steve Jones 5.33
- Danny Stoneman 3.83
- Ross Walter 3.00
- Adam Ellis 3.00

King's Lynn Young Stars

- Darren Mallet 7.48
- Lewis Kerr 6.67
- Jake Knight 5.93
- Adam Lowe 5.62
- Brendan Johnson 5.25
- Tom Stokes 5.12
- Scott Campos 4.54
- Lewis Rose 3.00

Mildenhall Fen Tigers

- Cameron Heeps 9.18
- Stefan Nielsen 8.32
- Joe Jacobs 7.94
- Lewis Blackbird 7.01
- Danny Halsey 6.57
- Josh Bates 5.30
- Ryan Terry-Daley 3.00
- Joe Graver 3.00

Rye House Raiders

- Jason Garrity 9.42
- James Sarjeant 7.87
- Ben Morley 7.82
- Luke Chessell 4.59
- Shane Hazelden 4.57
- Connor Coles 4.30
- Brad Tokley 3.00

Scunthorpe Saints

- Jerran Hart 9.04
- Steve Worrall 8.36
- Gary Irving 8.17
- Tom Young 7.04
- Oliver Greenwood 6.57
- Max Clegg 4.54
- Danny Phillips 3.00
- Tommy Fenwick 3.00

Stoke Potters

- Ashley Birks 9.66
- Tony Atkin 7.75
- Ben Reade 7.70
- James Cockle 6.24
- Liam Carr 3.61
- Richard Andrews 3.41
- Liam Rumsey 3.00

== Development Leagues ==
=== Midland Development League ===
Pos	team	P	W	D	L	Pts
1	Milton Keynes Knights	12	9	1	2	19
2	Belle Vue Colts	11	7	1	3	15
3	Coventry-Mercia Vikings	11	5	2	4	12
4	Long Eaton	12	5	1	6	11
5	Stoke	12	4	1	7	9
6	Scunthorpe	12	4	0	8	8
7	Sheffield	12	3	0	9	6

Milton Keynes won grand final 21–15

=== Anglian Development League ===
Pos	team	P	W	D	L	Pts
1	King's Lynn	10	10	0	0	20
2	Lakeside	10	7	0	3	14
3	Mildenhall	9	5	1	3	11
4	Rye House	10	3	0	7	6
5	Peterborough	10	2	0	8	4
6	Ipswich	9	1	1	7	3

=== Northern Development League ===
Pos	team	P	W	D	L	Pts
1	Edinburgh	6	0	0	0	12
2	Redcar	6	4	0	2	8
3	Berwick	6	1	1	4	3
4	Workington	6	0	1	5	1

== See also ==
List of United Kingdom Speedway League Champions
