= National League Pairs Championship =

British motorcycle speedway contest

- Sport: Speedway
- Founded: 2004 (Conference League); 2009 (National League)
- Country: United Kingdom

The National League Pairs Championship is a motorcycle speedway contest for tier three clubs in the United Kingdom. The Championship is between the top two riders from each club competing in the National League. The meetings comprise a competition between teams of two riders drawn into two qualifying groups. It was known as the Conference League Pairs from 2004 to 2008.

== Format ==
Gate positions

In the Qualification Heats, riders are allocated starting gates. For the Semi-Finals, the group winners have first choice of gate positions (A&C or B&D). Gate A is on the inside of the track, whilst Gate D is on the outside. For the Final, the gate positions (A&C and B&D) are decided by the toss of a coin.

Points scoring

All heats are scored as follows: 1st = 4pts, 2nd = 3pts, 3rd = 2pts, 4th = 0pts

This system is used to encourage team riding. A pair finishing first and second will score seven points, whereas a pair finishing first and last will score only four. Race points scored over all 'qualification heats' are used to determine the final group placings. Where two teams are tied for a place, the team who scored most points scored in the heat where they met go through. Where more than two teams are tied for a place, the tie is resolved as follows: most wins, most second places, ballot.

== Past winners ==
Year	Winners	Riders	Runners-up	Riders
Conference League Pairs
2004	Wimbledon Dons	Mark Burrows & Barrie Evans	Mildenhall Fen Tigers	Ritchie Hawkins & Jon Armstrong
2005	Wimbledon Dons	Mark Burrows & Scott James	Oxford Silver Machine Academy	Craig Branney & Chris Mills
2006	Scunthorpe Scorpions	Paul Cooper & Benji Compton	Stoke Spitfires	Ben Barker & Adam Allott
2007	Boston Barracudas	Paul Cooper & Simon Lambert	Oxford Lions/Cheetahs	Jordan Frampton & Lee Smethills
2008	Boston Barracudas	Simon Lambert & James Cockle	Redcar Cubs	Scott James & Aaron Summers
National League Pairs
2009	Newport Hornets	Tony Atkin & Grant Tregoning	Bournemouth Buccaneers	Mark Baseby & Jay Herne
2010	Plymouth Devils	Nicki Glanz & Mark Simmonds	King's Lynn Young Stars	Simon Lambert & Adam Lowe
2011	Stoke Potters	Simon Lambert & Tim Webster	Newport Hornets	Jay Herne & Todd Kurtz
2012	Mildenhall Fen Tigers	Lewis Blackbird & Cameron Heeps	Buxton Hitmen	Robert Branford & Charles Wright
2013	Dudley Heathens	Ashley Morris & Lewis Blackbird	Mildenhall Fen Tigers	Josh Bates & Danny Halsey
2014	Stoke Potters	Ben Wilson & Jon Armstrong	Mildenhall Fen Tigers	Joe Jacobs & Danny Halsey
2015	Kent Kings	Ben Morley & Danny Ayres	Cradley Heathens	Max Clegg & Ellis Perks
2016-2018 competition not held
National Development League Pairs
2019	Kent Kings	Drew Kemp & Anders Rowe	Leicester Lions	Ellis Perks & Danyon Hume
2020 & 2021 cancelled due to COVID-19 pandemic
2022	Leicester Lion Cubs	Joe Thompson & Dan Thompson	Armadale Devils	Tom Woolley & Elliot Kelly
2023				

== See also ==
- Speedway in the United Kingdom
- List of United Kingdom Speedway Pairs champions
