= 2022 National Development League speedway season =

British motorcycle speedway season

- League: National Development League
- Champions: Leicester Lion Cubs
- Knockout Cup: Leicester Lion Cubs
- Pairs Championship: Leicester Lion Cubs
- Riders Championship: Jordan Jenkins
- Highest average: Dan Thompson
- Division/s above: SGB Premiership; SGB Championship

The 2022 National Development League was the third division/tier of British speedway for the 2022 season. It is a semi-professional development league, containing the junior sides of many SGB Premiership and SGB Championship clubs.

== Summary ==
Eight clubs competed for the League Championship, with Armadale, Belle Vue, Berwick, Kent, Leicester and champions Mildenhall all returning. Kent would switch venues from Central Park Stadium to the Iwade Speedway Stadium and would only enter the Royals in the National League. Oxford and Plymouth would also enter junior sides, taking the total to eight sides

The Championship Play Offs also returned in 2022 to determine the League Champions, as would the Knockout Cup. Leicester Lion Cubs dominated the season by winning the league and successfully defending their National League Knockout Cup title (from 2019) and winning the Pairs Championship.

Locations of the 2022 National Development League teams

== Regular season ==
League Table

Pos.	Club	M	Home			Away					F	A	Pts	+/−
Pos.	Club	M	W	D	L	4W	3W	D	1L	L	F	A	Pts	+/−
1	Leicester Lion Cubs	14	7	0	0	3	0	1	0	3	708	547	35	+161
2	Mildenhall Fen Tigers	14	5	0	2	3	0	1	1	2	674	573	30	+101
3	Berwick Bullets	14	7	0	0	1	1	0	1	4	668	583	29	+85
4	Oxford Chargers	14	5	1	1	1	2	0	0	4	652	600	26	+52
5	Belle Vue Colts	14	7	0	0	0	1	0	1	5	682	572	25	+110
6	Kent Royals	14	5	1	1	1	1	0	0	5	590	667	23	-77
7	Plymouth Centurions	14	2	0	5	0	0	0	1	6	536	721	7	-185
8	Armadale Devils	14	2	0	5	0	0	0	0	7	499	746	6	-247

Fixtures & Results

Home \ Away	ARM	BEL	BER	KEN	LEI	MIL	OXF	PLY
Armadale		51–36	38–52	42–48	36–53	38–50	42–48	51–39
Belle Vue	69–21		50–40	64–26	50–40	64–26	57–33	58–32
Berwick	56–28	55–35		53–37	49–41	48–42	50–40	67–23
Kent	55–35	47–43	46–44		50–40	45–45	42–47	47–43
Leicester	65–25	59–32	52–37	56–34		49–40	51–39	57–32
Mildenhall	60–27	41–47	57–33	57–32	39–50		55–32	56–34
Oxford	65–25	48–41	50–39	60–29	45–45	39–51		50–39
Plymouth	50–40	53–37	44–45	38–52	40–50	35–55	34–56	

Legend: Blue = home team win; Yellow = draw; Red = away team win.

League Scoring System

- Home loss by any number of points = 0
- Home draw = 1
- Home win by any number of points = 3
- Away loss by 7 points or more = 0
- Away loss by 6 points or less = 1
- Away draw = 2
- Away win by between 1 and 6 points = 3
- Away win by 7 points or more = 4

== Championship Play Offs ==
**Semi-finals**
1	**Leicester Lion Cubs**	44	**52**	96
4	Oxford Chargers	**46**	38	84
3	Berwick Bullets	**46**	22	68
2	**Mildenhall Fen Tigers**	43	**67**	110

**Grand Final**
Leicester Lion Cubs	52	**62**	114
Mildenhall Fen Tigers	**37**	28	65

Home team scores are in bold
Overall aggregate scores are in red

=== Final ===
First Leg

27 October

Mildenhall Fen Tigers; Jason Edwards 16; Luke Muff 9 Ashton Boughen 5 Alex Spooner 4 Josh Warren 2 Jack Kingston 1 James Shanes r/r	37–52	Leicester Lion Cubs; Dan Thompson 14; Joe Thompson 10; Connor Coles 8 Max Perry 7 Vinnie Foord 6 Mickie Simpson 5 Tom Spencer 2	Mildenhall Stadium; Referee(s): Mick Bates

Second Leg

4 November

Leicester Lion Cubs; Max Perry 11; Dan Thompson 11; Joe Thompson 11; Tom Spencer 10; Vinnie Foord 7 Mickie Simpson 7 Max James 5 Connor Coles r/r	62–28	Mildenhall Fen Tigers; Jason Edwards 17; Ashton Boughen 5 Tom Woolley 3 James Laker 2 Bailey Fellows 1 James Jessop 0 James Shanes r/r	Adrian Flux Arena

== Knockout Cup ==
The 2022 National Development League Knockout Cup was the 23rd edition of the Knockout Cup for tier three teams. It returned after being cancelled in 2021 due to the COVID-19 pandemic.

**Semi-finals**
1	Mildenhall Fen Tigers	**51**	42	93
4	Kent Royals	39	**48**	87
3	Berwick Bullets	27	**41**	68
2	Leicester Lion Cubs	**63**	49	112

**Grand Final**
Mildenhall Fen Tigers	29	**27**	56
**Leicester Lion Cubs**	**55**	61	116

Home team scores are in bold
Overall aggregate scores are in red

=== Final ===
First Leg

15 October

Leicester Lion Cubs; Dan Thompson 12; Joe Thompson 11; Connor Coles 10; Mickie Simpson 7 Vinnie Foord 7 Max Perry 4 Tom Spencer 4	55–29	Mildenhall Fen Tigers; Jason Edwards 8 Josh Warren 7 Luke Muff 5 Alex Spooner 4 Lee Complin 4 James Laker 1 Jack Kingston r/r	Paul Chapman and Sons Arena; Referee(s): Seth Perkin

Second Leg

27 October

Mildenhall Fen Tigers; Jason Edwards 13; Luke Muff 8 James Laker 4 Alex Spooner 2 Josh Warren 0 Jack Kingston DNR; James Shanes r/r	27–61	Leicester Lion Cubs; Tom Spencer 12; Max Perry 12; Dan Thompson 11; Joe Thompson 9 Vinnie Foord 7 Mickie Simpson 5 Max James 5 Connor Coles r/r	Mildenhall Stadium; Referee(s): Mick Bates

== Pairs Championship ==
The National League Pairs Championship, was held at Beaumont Park Stadium, on 20 August 2022. The event was won by Joe Thompson and Dan Thompson of the Leicester Lion Cubs.

Group A
Pos	Club	Riders	Pts
1st	Leicester Q	Joe Thompson & Dan Thompson	21
2nd	Armadale Q	Tom Woolley & Elliot Kelly	13
3rd	Berwick	Greg Blair & Luke Crang	12
4th	Belle Vue	Jack Smith & Harry McGurk	8

Group B
Pos	Club	Riders	Pts
1st	Plymouth Q	Adam Roynon & Rhys Naylor	16
2nd	Oxford Q	Jordan Jenkins & Sam Hagon	14
3rd	Mildenhall	Jason Edwards & Jack Kingston	14
4th	Kent	Ben Morley & Sam Woolley	9

Semi-finals

Team one	Team two	Score	Result
Leicester	Oxford	7-2	D. Thompson, J. Thompson, Jenkins, Hagon
Armadale	Plymouth	5-4	Roynon, Kelly, Woolley, Naylor (f.exc)

Final

Team one	Team two	Score	Result
Leicester	Armadale	7-2	D. Thompson, J. Thompson, Kelly, Woolley

== Leading Averages ==
	Rider	Team	Average
1	Dan Thompson	Leicester	10.81
2	Jason Edwards	Mildenhall	10.50
3	Alfie Bowtell	Kent	10.30
4	Ben Morley	Kent	10.00
5	Nathan Stoneman	Oxford	9.73

- averages include NDL, KO Cup, min 6 matches

== Riders' Championship ==
The 2022 edition of the National Development League Riders Championship, took place on Sunday 25 September at The Eddie Wright Raceway, Scunthorpe.

Pos.	Rider	Total
1	Jordan Jenkins	14
2	Max Clegg	13+3
3	Jason Edwards	13+2
4	Lee Complin	11
5	Ben Morley	10
6	Dan Thompson	10
7	Joe Thompson	9
8	Jack Kingston	9
9	Tom Woolley	7
10	Jack Smith	7
11	Ben Trigger	5
12	Jody Scott	4
13	Harry McGurk	3
14	Luke Harrison	2
15	Mason Watson	2
16	Luke Crang	1
17	Jack Shimelt (res)	0

== Squads & final averages ==
=== Armadale Devils ===
- (England) Lee Complin 8.28
- (Scotland) William Lawson 7.29
- (England) Tom Woolley 7.12
- (England) Danny Phillips 6.95
- (England) Josh Embleton 4.80
- (England) Elliot Kelly 4.38
- (Scotland) Gregor Millar 3.85
- (England) Kyran Lyden 2.50
- (Scotland) Lewis Millar 1.68

=== Belle Vue Colts ===
- (England) Jake Mulford 8.72
- (England) Jack Smith 8.67
- (England) Harry McGurk 8.30
- (England) Nathan Ablitt 7.68
- (England) Sam McGurk 6.75
- (England) Archie Freeman 6.31
- (England) Freddy Hodder 5.61

=== Berwick Bullets ===
- (England) Kyle Bickley 9.44
- (Scotland) Greg Blair 8.16
- (England) Luke Crang 7.17
- (Scotland) Ace Pijper 7.11
- (England) Mason Watson 5.32
- (England) Ben Rathbone 4.50
- (Scotland) Kieran Douglas 3.87

=== Kent Royals ===
- (England) Max Clegg 12.00
- (England) Alfie Bowtell 10.30
- (England) Ben Morley 10.00
- (England) Joe Alcock 8.19
- (England) Connor King 6.14
- (England) Danno Verge 5.55
- (England) Sam Woolley 4.22
- (England) Jamie Halder 3.52
- (England) Chris Watts 2.61
- (England) Sam Woods 2.00

=== Leicester Lion Cubs ===
- (England) Dan Thompson 10.81
- (England) Joe Thompson 9.69
- (England) Connor Coles 9.29
- (England) Max Perry 7.25
- (England) Tom Spencer 6.11
- (England) Vinnie Ford 5.57
- (England) Mickie Simpson 5.12

=== Mildenhall Fen Tigers ===
- (England) Jason Edwards 10.50
- (England) Jack Kingston 7.06
- (England) Sam Bebee 7.02
- (England) James Shanes 7.00
- (England) Alex Spooner 6.83
- (England) Josh Warren 6.21
- (England) Luke Muff 5.88

=== Oxford Chargers ===
- (Wales) Nathan Stoneman 9.73
- (England) Jordan Jenkins 9.65
- (England) Henry Atkins 8.23
- (England) Jody Scott 6.63
- (England) Sam Hagon 6.35
- (England) Arran Butcher 5.25
- (England) Jacob Clouting 4.98
- (England) Ben Hopwood 2.91

=== Plymouth Centurions ===
- (England) Dan Gilkes 10.67
- (England) Adam Roynon 8.83
- (England) Richard Andrews 6.20
- (England) Ben Trigger 5.96
- (England) Rhys Naylor 5.33
- (England) Adam Extance 4.93
- (England) David Abraham 3.20
- (England) Eli Meadows 0.80

== See also ==
- List of United Kingdom speedway league champions
- Knockout Cup (speedway)
