= Jon Armstrong =

English speedway rider

- Born: 1 August 1974 (age 52); Manchester, England
- Nationality: British (English)

Career history
- 1992–1993, 1999, 2004: Belle Vue Aces
- 1993, 2018: Coventry Bees
- 1996–1997, 2002, 2007: Buxton Hitmen
- 1997, 1999, 2001–2003 2014–2015: Stoke Potters
- 1998, 2000: Newport Wasps/Mavericks
- 2004–2006, 2013, 2016–2017: Mildenhall Fen Tigers
- 2007: Birmingham Brummies
- 2008–2009: Weymouth Wildcats
- 2010–2011: Dudley Heathens

Individual honours
- 1997: Conference League Riders' Champion

Team honours
- 2002, 2004: Knockout Cup
- 2004, 2008: Conference League
- 2004, 2011: Fours champion
- 2014: National League Pairs Championship

Jon Thomas Armstrong (born 1 August 1974) is a former motorcycle speedway rider from England.

== Career ==
Armstrong started racing in the British leagues during the 1992 British League season, when riding a couple of times in the reserve berth for the Belle Vue Aces. After a break from speedway in 1994 and 1995 he returned in 1996 riding for Buxton Hitmen and recording an 8.77 average. The following season he won the Conference League Riders' Championship, held on 7 September at Long Eaton Stadium.

Armstrong rode for various clubs over the following years and won the Knockout Cup in 2002 with Buxton and secured the treble of league, cup and fours in 2004 with Mildenhall Fen Tigers.

Armstrong joined Weymouth Wildcats in 2008 and suffered a major injury, breaking his tibia and patella tendon. He missed the rest of the season but took some consolation in the fact that Weymouth won the league. After joining the Dudley Heathens, he topped the averages for them during the 2011 National League speedway season and was part of the Dudley team that won the National League Fours, held on 30 July 2011 at Loomer Road Stadium.

As a Stoke rider, Armstrong won the National League Pairs Championship with Ben Wilson, held at Mildenhall Stadium, on 15 June 2014.

In 2018, Armstrong earned a testimonial meeting, during his last season in speedway.
