= Paul Cooper (speedway rider) =

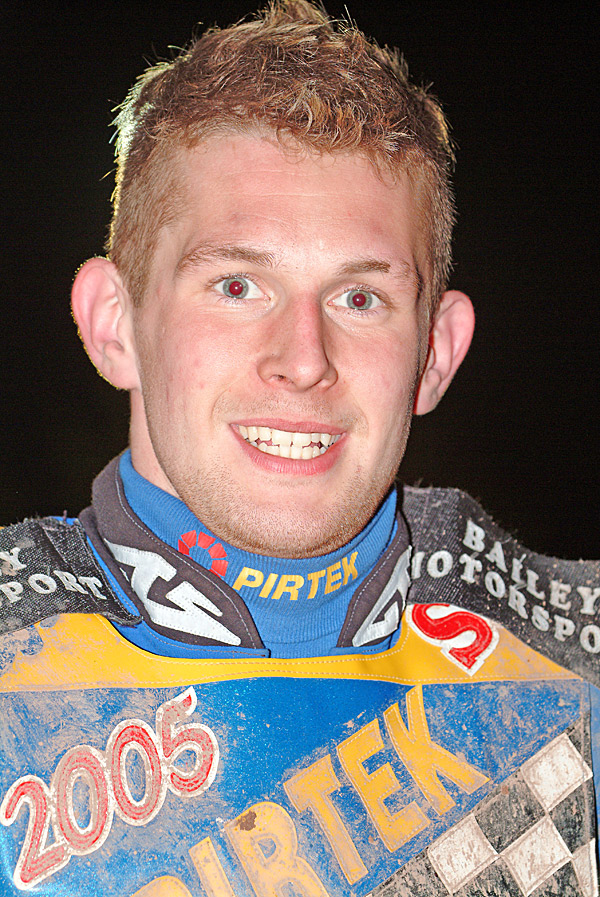
- Born: 7 June 1982 (age 44); York, England
- Nationality: British (English)

Career history
- 2003-2010: Sheffield Tigers
- 2004: Oxford
- 2004: Workington Comets
- 2004: Berwick Bandits

Individual honours
- 2000, 2007: British 250cc Grasstrack Champion
- 2005: British 350cc Grasstrack Champion
- 2017: British Sand Ace Champion

Team honours
- 2006, 2007: Conference League Pairs champion

Paul Robert Cooper (born 7 June 1982 in York, England) is a former motorcycle speedway rider from England.

== Career ==
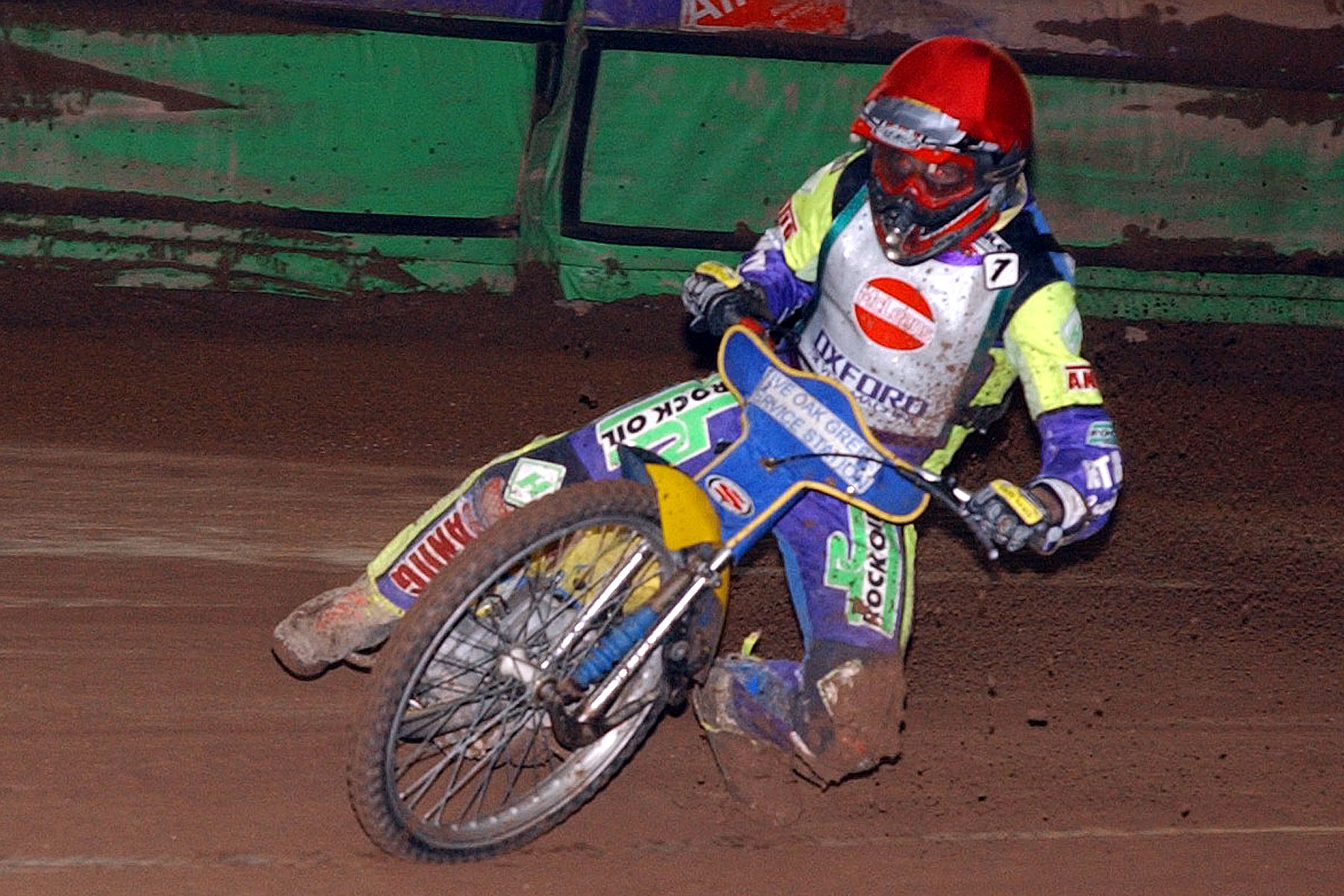
Cooper riding for Oxford juniors in 2004

Cooper primarily rode for Sheffield Tigers throughout his career. Cooper is twice a winner of the Conference League Pairs Championship, partnering Benji Compton in 2006 and Simon Lambert in 2007.

Cooper is also an accomplished grasstrack, long track and motorcycle racing rider, reaching the World Final of the latter. He is a multi-British Grasstrack Champion in the minor solo classes and was the 2017 and 2019 British Sand Ace Champion.

== World Longtrack Championship ==
Grand-Prix

- 2003 – One Grand-Prix 0pts (28th)
- 2009 – Two Grand-Prix 14pts (18th)

== European Grasstrack Championship ==
Final

- 2003 (France) La Reole 6pts (14th)
- 2007 (England) Folkestone 9pts (12th)
- 2012 (Netherlands) Eenrum 7pts (11th)
- 2013 (Germany) Bielefeld 4pts (12th)
- 2014 (France) St. Macaire 7pts (14th)
- 2015 (Netherlands) Staphorst 11pts (4th)
- 2016 (England) Folkestone 12pts (10th)
