= Joel Parsons =

Australian speedway rider

- Born: 24 July 1985 (age 41); New South Wales, Australia
- Nationality: Australian

Career history
- 2003: Rye House
- 2003: Wimbledon
- 2004: King's Lynn
- 2004–2005: Hull
- 2005: Mildenhall
- 2006: Newport
- 2007–2009: Sheffield
- 2008: Swindon
- 2010: Scunthorpe

Team honours
- 2004: Premier League Champion
- 2004: Premier League KO Cup Winner
- 2004: Young Shield Winner
- 2003: Conference League Fours Winner

Joel Lewis Parsons (born 24 July 1985 in Broken Hill, New South Wales, Australia) is a former professional motorcycle speedway rider from Australia.

== Career ==
Parsons was a member of the treble winning Hull Vikings team that won the Premier League, the KO Cup and the Young Shield in 2004.

Parsons last raced for Scunthorpe Scorpions in 2010.
