= Nathan Stoneman =

Welsh speedway rider

- Born: 17 September 1996 (age 30); Cardiff, Wales
- Nationality: British (Welsh)

Career history
- 2012-2013: Mildenhall Fen Tigers
- 2016: Isle of Wight Islanders
- 2017: Sheffield Tigers
- 2017-2018: Kent Kings
- 2019: Birmingham Brummies
- 2019: Somerset Rebels
- 2022-2023: Oxford Chargers
- 2022-2023: Berwick Bandits

Team honours
- 2012: League & cup winners

Nathan Mark Stoneman (born 17 September 1996) is a speedway rider from Wales.

== Career ==
Stoneman began his speedway career in 2012 with the Mildenhall Fen Tigers, where he picked up a league and cup double as the team dominated the 2012 National League speedway season. The following season, he remained with the Tigers for the 2013 National League speedway season.

After a lengthy break, Stoneman returned to speedway in 2016 when he joined the Isle of Wight Islanders. In 2017, he joined the Kent Kings but also made several appearances for the Sheffield Tigers in the higher division.

In 2019, Stoneman rode for the Birmingham Brummies and Somerset Rebels before taking another break. In 2022, he rode for the Berwick Bandits in the SGB Championship 2022. Also in 2022, Stoneman utilised his landscape gardening background by helping the renovation of the speedway facilities at Oxford Stadium on their return to speedway. He rode for the Oxford Chargers during the 2022 National Development League speedway season. He enjoyed a successful season helping Oxford eventually reach the play offs but suffered a broken shoulder blade which prevented further participation.

In 2023, Stoneman re-signed for Berwick for the SGB Championship 2023 but also remained with the Chargers for the 2023 NDL season.
