= Barry Burchatt =

British speedway rider

- Born: 24 October 1987 (age 37); Farnborough, England
- Nationality: British (English)

Career history
- 2003: Newport Mavericks
- 2003–2006: Rye House Raiders
- 2003: Wimbledon Dons
- 2006: Mildenhall Fen Tigers
- 2007: Newport Wasps
- 2008: Workington Comets

Barry Peter Burchatt (born 24 October 1987 in Farnborough, Kent) is a former speedway rider in the United Kingdom who rode for the Newport Wasps in 2007 and for the Workington Comets in 2008 in the Premier League.

== Accident ==
Burchatt almost lost his life in a crash during a grasstrack meeting on 11 May 2008. The crash left him with critical internal injuries and forced his retirement from speedway.
