= Ben Wilson (speedway rider) =

- Born: 15 March 1986 (age 40); Sheffield, England
- Nationality: British (English)

Career history
- 2001–2008, 2014: Sheffield Tigers
- 2003, 2018: Buxton Hitmen
- 2004: Carmarthen Dragons
- 2006: Wolverhampton Wolves
- 2007: Belle Vue Aces
- 2009–2010: Redcar Bears
- 2009: Poole Pirates
- 2010, 2014, 2016: Stoke Potters
- 2011, 2015: Scunthorpe Scorpions
- 2017: Isle of Wight Warriors
- 2019: Plymouth Gladiators

Individual honours
- 2006: British Under-21 Champion

Team honours
- 2014: National League Pairs Championship

Ben Ryan Wilson (born 15 March 1986 in Sheffield, England) is a former professional motorcycle speedway rider.

== Career ==
Wilson started his career with the Sheffield Prowlers on his 15th birthday in the Conference League. He was selected as the Sheffield Tigers reserve for the 2003 season, and after a slow start he continued into 2004, where he showed more promise. In 2005, Wilson moved up to second string in which he partnered Sean Wilson, and continued to improve his average throughout the year.

In 2006, Wilson's form from 2005 was noticed and he was signed to double up with Wolverhampton Wolves in the Elite League, as well as riding for Sheffield. He also won the British Under-21 Championship at the Norfolk Arena, by beating Danny King and Lewis Bridger. This result earned Wilson a reserve position at the British Grand Prix that year. He also came second in the Premier League Pairs Championship with team-mate Ricky Ashworth, only beaten by the holders Glasgow Tigers. In 2007, Wilson was once again re-signed by the Sheffield Tigers to fill the third heat leader role. In 2009, he was voted Redcar Bears rider of the year.

After two seasons out of the sport, Wilson signed to ride for Stoke Potters in the National League in 2014. He won the National League Pairs Championship with Jon Armstrong, held at Mildenhall Stadium, on 15 June 2014.

In 2017, Wilson signed for the Isle of Wight Warriors. His last season before retirement was in the 2019 National Development League speedway season (the third tier of British speedway) riding for Plymouth Gladiators.
