= Lee Smart (speedway rider) =

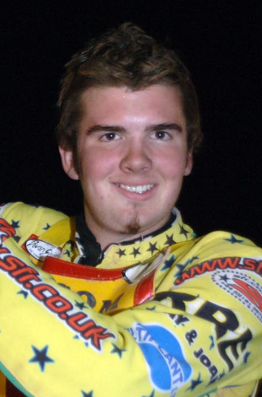
- Born: 5 April 1988 (age 38); Swindon, England
- Nationality: British (English)

Career history
- 2003: Swindon Sprockets
- 2003: Stoke Spitfires
- 2004: Mildenhall Fen Tigers
- 2005: Somerset Rebels
- 2005–2008: Weymouth Wildcats
- 2006, 2011: Plymouth Devils
- 2007–2008, 2009: Birmingham Brummies
- 2010: Dudley Heathens
- 2010, 2013: Stoke Potters
- 2012: Redcar Bears
- 2014: Poole Pirates
- 2016: Isle of Wight Islanders

Individual honours
- 2010: National League Riders' Champion

Team honours
- 2004, 2008: Conference League Champion
- 2004: Conference League KO Cup Winner
- 2004: Conference League Trophy Winner
- 2008: Conference League Fours

Lee Mitchell Smart (born 5 April 1988) in Swindon, Wiltshire, is a former motorcycle speedway rider from England.

== Career ==
Smart raced for the Mildenhall Fen Tigers in the Premier League in 2008 after being released by the Birmingham Brummies mid-season, having previously been part of the Fen Tigers multi-trophy winning Conference League team in 2004.

Smart was part of the Weymouth Wildcats team that won the 2008 Speedway Conference League and the Conference League Four-Team Championship, the latter was held on 18 October 2008 at Loomer Road Stadium.

During the 2010 National League speedway season, Smart won the National League Riders' Championship, held on 30 October at Rye House Stadium.

Smart signed to race for Stoke Potters in the National League in 2013. His last season before retirement was riding for Poole Pirates in the 2014 Elite League speedway season and although he only rode four times the team won the title.

In 2016, Smart came out of retirement to ride for the Isle of Wight Islanders during the 2016 National League speedway season.
