= Cameron Heeps =

Australian speedway rider (born 1995)

- Born: 27 October 1995 (age 31); Perth, Western Australia
- Nationality: Australian

Career history

Great Britain
- 2011, 2013-2015: Mildenhall Fen Tigers
- 2013–2015, 2016 2018–2022: Ipswich Witches
- 2016: Rye House Rockets
- 2018: Somerset Rebels
- 2018: Wolverhampton Wolves
- 2019: Edinburgh Monarchs
- 2021: Kent Kings
- 2022–2025: Oxford Cheetahs

Denmark
- 2013: Munkebo

Individual honours
- 2013, 2015, 2017, 2018, 2023: Western Australian State Champion

Team honours
- 2012: National League Pairs Championship

Cameron Andrew George Heeps (born 27 October 1995) is an Australian speedway rider.

== Career ==
Heeps began his British career riding for the Mildenhall Fen Tigers in 2011, winning the Knockout Cup. He won the National League Pairs Championship with Lewis Blackbird, held at Mildenhall Stadium, on 22 July 2012.

Heeps joined Ipswich Witches in 2012 and has appeared for them during most of the next ten seasons. In between he had spells at Rye House Rockets during the 2016 Premier League speedway season, the Somerset Rebels and Wolverhampton Wolves. He was released from Wolves following a loss of form. In 2019, he had a season with the Edinburgh Monarchs.

In 2021m Heeps rode for Ipswich and Kent. In 2022, he rode for the Ipswich Witches in the SGB Premiership 2022 and the Oxford Cheetahs in the SGB Championship 2022. The Cheetahs were returning to action after a 14-year absence from British Speedway.

Heeps re-signed for Oxford Cheetahs for the SGB Championship 2023, SGB Championship 2024 and SGB Championship 2025 seasons.
