= Barrie Evans (speedway rider) =

English speedway rider

- Born: 16 April 1984 (age 42); King's Lynn, England
- Nationality: British (English)

Career history
- 1999–2003, 2008–2009: Mildenhall Fen Tigers
- 2000–2001: Arena Essex Hammers
- 2002, 2004: Newport Wasps
- 2003: Hull Vikings
- 2005–2008: Stoke Potters/Spitfires
- 2010: Dudley Heathens
- 2011: Hackney Hawks

Individual honours
- 2003: Conference League Riders' Champion

Team honours
- 2003: Conference League
- 2003: Knockout Cup
- 2004: Conference League Pairs

Barrie Evans (born 16 April 1984) is a former motorcycle speedway rider from England.

== Career ==
Evans started racing in the British leagues during the 1999 Speedway Conference League, when riding for Mildenhall Fen Tigers. The following season he signed for the Arena Essex Hammers in the Premier League but remained with Mildenhall by doubling up.

In 2002, Evans joined Newport Wasps although he was still doubling up with Mildenhall. He rode with Newport Wasps in the Premier League during 2003 but recorded his best season as a Mildenhall rider the same year. He helped Mildenhall win the Conference League and Knockout Cup double, in addition to winning the Conference League Riders' Championship, held on 30 August at Rye House Stadium.

Evans continued to double up riding for Newport and Wimbledon Dons in 2004, he won the Conference League Pairs with Wimbledon in 2004. He then joined Stoke Potters and their junior side Stoke Spitfires in 2005. Evans won Stoke's 2007 Speedway Conference League rider of the year in 2007. He would ride for Stoke until the end of the 2008 season. After 2009 with Mildenhall, where he topped the team's averages, he would race two final seasons with the Dudley Heathens and Hackney Hawks in 2010 and 2011 respectively.
