= Lewis Blackbird =

British motorcycle speedway rider

- Born: 21 February 1987 (age 39); Peterborough, England

Career history

Great Britain
- 2006: Sittingbourne Crusaders
- 2007: Oxford Lions
- 2011–2012: Mildenhall Fen Tigers
- 2012–2013: Leicester Lions
- 2013: Dudley Heathens
- 2013: Scunthorpe Scorpions
- 2014–2015: Peterborough Panthers
- 2014: Eastbourne Eagles
- 2015: Wolverhampton Wolves

Team honours
- 2011, 2012: National League KO Cup
- 2012, 2013: National League Pairs
- 2012, 2013: National League
- 2012, 2013: Fours winner
- 2012: National League Trophy

Lewis William C. Blackbird (born 21 February 1987) is a former motorcycle speedway rider from England.

== Biography ==
Born in Peterborough, Blackbird is the son of Carl Blackbird and nephew of Mark and Paul Blackbird, all former riders. Before taking up speedway, he rode in motocross from the age of 14. After one appearance for Sittingbourne Crusaders in 2006 and two for Oxford Lions in 2007, he competed in mini-bike racing in 2008, winning the 88cc British Championship. In 2010, he bought a speedway bike and returned to the sport.

Blackbird was signed to ride for King's Lynn Young Stars National League team in 2011, but transferred to Mildenhall Fen Tigers before the season started. He was part of the team that won the National League Knock Out Cup in 2011. He more than doubled his starting average in 2011, also making several guest appearances in the Premier League, and rode in the Midland Development League for Long Eaton Invaders.

Blackbird started the 2012 season as the Fen Tigers team captain. His good form continued in 2012, although a dislocated shoulder sustained in a fall at King's Lynn in May kept him out for a few weeks.

An injury to Simon Nielsen in June 2012 saw Blackbird guest again in the Premier League for Leicester Lions, going on to be declared in the team for the remainder of the season in July. In July 2012, with Cameron Heeps he won the National League Pairs Championship for Mildenhall. With Mildenhall he also won the National League title, the National League Knock Out Cup, the National League Fours, and the National League Trophy in 2012.

Blackbird re-signed with Leicester for the 2013 Premier League season and shortly afterwards also signed to ride for Dudley Heathens in the National League in 2013. In May 2013, Blackbird moved to Scunthorpe Scorpions from Leicester but went on to win the National League Fours again but this time with Dudley.

In 2014, Blackbird rode for his home town team Peterborough Panthers in the Premier League and Eastbourne Eagles in the Elite League. He stayed with the Panthers in 2015 and rode for Wolverhampton Wolves in the Elite League. On 20 August 2015, after the latest of several crashes during the season, Blackbird announced his retirement from the sport with immediate effect.
