= Ashley Birks =

British speedway rider

- Born: 19 October 1990 (age 36); Sheffield, England
- Nationality: British (English)

Career history
- 2010: Scunthorpe Saints
- 2011, 2015: Sheffield Tigers
- 2012-2014: Scunthorpe Scorpions
- 2013: Swindon Robins
- 2015: Lakeside Hammers

Individual honours
- 2012: National League Riders' Champion

Ashley Adam Birks (born 19 October 1990) in Sheffield, South Yorkshire, England is a former speedway rider from England.

== Career ==
Birks rode with the Scunthorpe Scorpions in the Premier League and Swindon Robins in the Elite League.

A former motocross rider, Birks chose to take up speedway when serious injuries brought his motocross career to a premature end. In 2010, Birks signed for Scunthorpe Saints in the National League.

After a successful first year in Speedway, Birks then signed for the Sheffield Tigers in the Premier League for the 2011 season.

During the 2012 National League speedway season, Birks won the National League Riders' Championship, held on 29 September at Rye House Stadium.

The following year in 2013, Birks signed to ride for Swindon Robins but his career at Swindon ended badly after he broke his back in two places towards the end of the season.
