= Danny Halsey =

British speedway rider

- Born: 15 September 1988 (age 38); Aylesbury, Buckinghamshire
- Nationality: British (English)

Career history
- 2005–2009: Rye House Rockets
- 2011–2018: Mildenhall Fen Tigers
- 2009: Birmingham Brummies
- 2010: Bournemouth Buccaneers
- 2014: Eastbourne Eagles
- 2019: Cradley Heathens

Individual honours
- 2014: National League Riders' Champion

Team honours
- 2012: National League Fours

Daniel John Halsey (born 15 September 1988) is a former motorcycle speedway rider from England.

== Speedway career ==
Halsey started his speedway career in England riding for the junior team at Rye House Rockets in 2005.

Halsey was part of the Mildenhall Fen Tigers team that won the National League Fours, held on 26 August 2012 at Loomer Road Stadium.

During the 2014 National League speedway season, Halsey won the National League Riders' Championship, when with Mildenhall. This was the same season that he rode for Eastbourne Eagles during the 2014 Elite League speedway season.

In 2017 and 2018, Halsey started his seventh and eighth league seasons with Mildenhall Fen Tigers. In 2019, he signed for Cradley Heathens to race in the 2019 National Development League speedway season.
