= Mildenhall Fen Tigers =

British motorcycle speedway team

- Mildenhall Fen Tigers

Club information
- Track address: Mildenhall Stadium; Hayland Drove; West Row; Mildenhall
- Country: England
- Founded: 1975
- Website: www.mildenhall-speedway.com

Club facts
- Colours: Orange and Black
- Track size: 260 metres (280 yd)
- Track record time: 49.68
- Track record date: 14 July 2013
- Track record holder: Steve Boxall

Major team honours
tier 2 Champions	1979
tier 2 Pairs Winners	1987
tier 2 Fours Winners	1984, 1987
tier 3 Champions	2003, 2004, 2012, 2021
tier 3 KO Cup Winners	2003, 2004, 2011, 2012, 2023
tier 3 Pairs Winners	2012
tier 3 Fours Winners	2004, 2012
tier 3 Trophy Winners	2000, 2002, 2004, 2012, 2018

The Mildenhall Fen Tigers are a British speedway team, founded in 1975, who last raced in the National Development League during 2023.

== History ==
=== 1970s ===
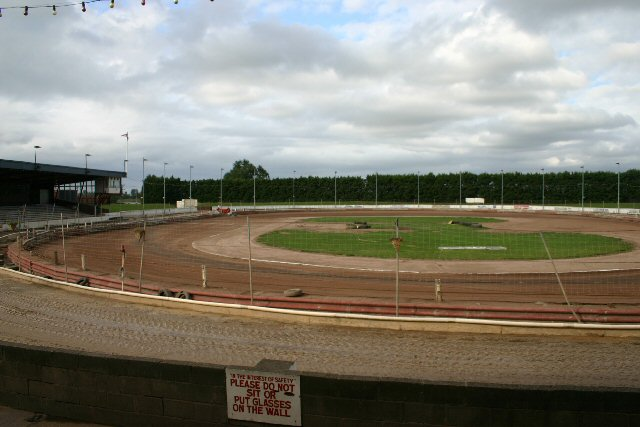
Mildenhall Stadium

The original track was built in 1971 on farm land owned by Terry Waters, with Bernie Klatt the driving force behind establishing speedway in Mildenhall. Klatt had been the head chef at the officers club at the nearby air force base, and later established a restaurant at the track.

The speedway track was moved to a second area on the same farm in February 1973, with Klatt and Waters opening the 300 yard circumference circuit as a training school for riders. The following year in 1974, an application was made to the Speedway Control Board for the status of an official practice track.

After running as a training track, the Mildenhall team entered the New National League (division 2) in 1975, with the first home fixture held on 18 May against Scunthorpe Saints.

Following four tough seasons from 1975 to 1978, the team came good during the 1979 National League season, winning the league title. Four riders were influential throughout the season and scored heavily, Ray Bales, Mick Hines, Melvyn Taylor and Robert Henry averaged between 9.51 and 8.87 respectively.

=== 1980s ===
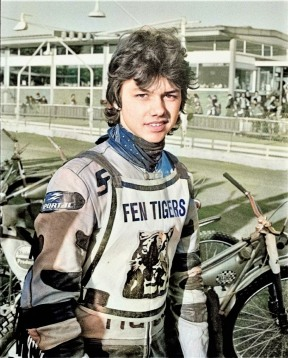
Melvyn Taylor

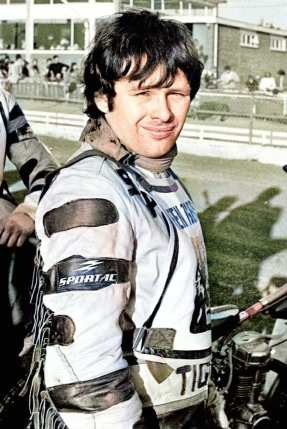
Ray Bales

The Fen Tigers were a major challenger during the 1980s and were unlucky to finish runner-up four times in 1982, 1983, 1984 and 1987 and runner-up in the Knockout Cup in 1986 and 1987.

However, the club did win the Fours championship final, held at the East of England Showground on 22 July 1984, with Bales, Henry, Carl Blackbird and Carl Baldwin and the Pairs and Fours in 1987. The pairs was won by Dave Jessup and Melvyn Taylor (the latter had returned to the club in 1985), and the fours was sealed by Jessup, Taylor, Eric Monaghan and Dave Jackson. The 1989 season saw a complete change to the club and team, with Skid Parish taking over the promotion and Dave Jackson being the only rider retained. A financial crisis ensued and Mildenhall dropped out of the league.

=== 1990s ===
Despite no team racing at West Row, the track remained open from 1990 to 1991. The 1992 season started with fixtures in the Gold Cup and league before the team withdrew from the 1992 British League Division Two season. The club finally found some stability in 1994, when they joined the third tier of British speedway (primarily for junior riders). The club then experienced six years of mediocrity.

=== 2000s ===
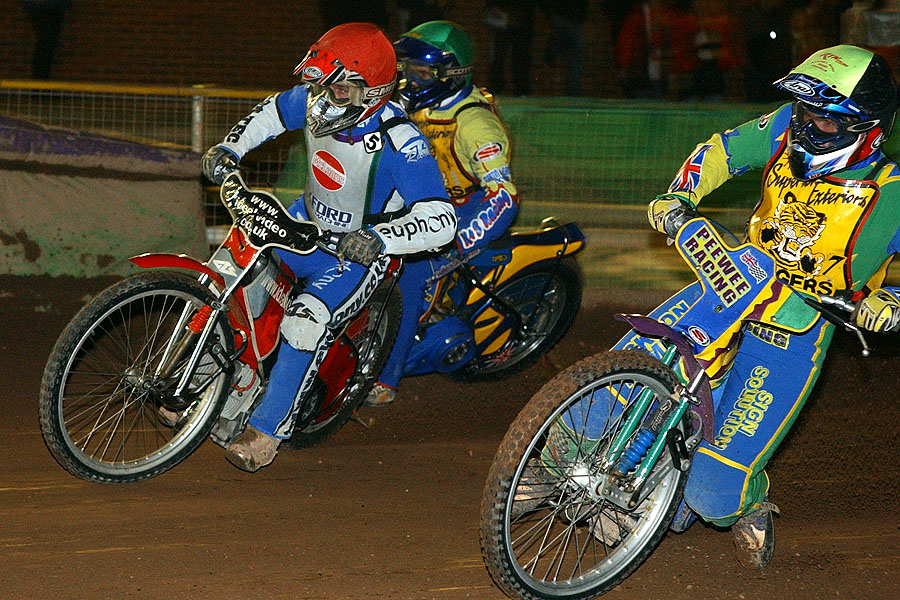
Mildenhall versus Oxford in 2004

In 2000, the team were denied the league title in unfortunate circumstances. The bad weather meant that the Fen Tigers were unable to hold their final home fixture before the 1 November deadline and finished runner-up to Sheffield Prowlers, with both teams on 31 points.

The Tigers won the league and cup double twice during the 2003 Speedway Conference League and 2004 Speedway Conference League seasons.

The club moved up to the Premier League in 2006, when new promoter Mick Horton took over. He also formed a junior side called the Mildenhall Academy that rode in the 2006 Speedway Conference League. In 2007, stadium owner Carl Harris formed Fen Tigers Limited with the intention of selling the company shares to the fans. Lifelong supporter Simon Barton bought a major shareholding in the club until the promotion sold to Keith & Jonathan Chapman in August 2008. Team manager Laurence Rogers was replaced with former Tigers rider Richard Knight. At the beginning of the season the club struggled to find a sponsor, so uniquely, the fans collectively sponsored the team. Following the 2008 season. the club dropped back down to the third division.

=== 2010s ===
In 2010, the team withdrew from the league and had their results were expunged but the following season they bounced back by winning the Knockout Cup. The 2012 National League speedway season was even better as the Fen Tigers made a clean sweep of four trophies, winning the league and cup double, pairs and fours.

After dominating the league standings during the 2018 season, the Tigers were unlucky to lose the play-off final to Eastbourne Eagles, although some consolation was found in winning the National Trophy.

=== 2020s ===
After the leagues were cancelled in 2020 due to the COVID-19 pandemic, the team competed in the third division for the 12th consecutive season and were crowned champions for the fourth time since 2003.

After the 2022 campaign there was uncertainty as to whether the club could line up for the 2023 season but in January it was announced they would compete. In 2023, the team went on to win the Knockout Cup but then declared their intention to sit out the 2024 season, following an ownership change.

== Season summary ==
Extended content

Year and league	Position	Notes
1975 New National League season	19th	
1976 National League season	13th	
1977 National League season	8th	
1978 National League season	12th	
1979 National League season	1st	Champions
1980 National League season	7th	
1981 National League season	8th	
1982 National League season	2nd	
1983 National League season	2nd	
1984 National League season	2nd	fours
1985 National League season	15th	
1986 National League season	7th	
1987 National League season	2nd	pairs, fours
1988 National League season	13th	
1989 National League season	16th	
1992 British League Division Two season	N/A	withdrew, results expunged
1994 British League Division Three	5th	
1995 Academy League	5th	
1996 Speedway Conference League	7th	
1997 Speedway Conference League	5th	
1998 Speedway Conference League	3rd	
1999 Speedway Conference League	5th	
2000 Speedway Conference League	2nd	
2001 Speedway Conference League	8th	
2002 Speedway Conference League	3rd	
2003 Speedway Conference League	1st	Champions & Knockout Cup winners
2004 Speedway Conference League	1st	Champions & Knockout Cup winners
2005 Speedway Conference League	4th	
2006 Premier League speedway season	13th	
2006 Speedway Conference League	7th	junior team called the Mildenhall Academy
2007 Premier League speedway season	12th	
2008 Premier League speedway season	16th	
2009 National League speedway season	9th	
2010 National League speedway season	N/A	withdrew, results expunged
2011 National League speedway season	4th	Knockout Cup winners
2012 National League speedway season	2nd	Champions (won PO) & Knockout Cup winners
2013 National League speedway season	3rd	
2014 National League speedway season	4th	
2015 National League speedway season	7th	
2016 National League speedway season	6th	
2017 National League speedway season	5th	
2018 National League speedway season	1st	lost in PO final, National Trophy winners
2019 National Development League speedway season	5th	
2021 National Development League speedway season	1st	champions
2022 National Development League speedway season	2nd	lost in PO final
2023 National Development League speedway season	4th	Knockout Cup winners

== Riders previous seasons ==
Extended content

2006 team

- (England) Shaun Tacey
- (England) Jon Armstrong
- (England) Jason King
- (England) Daniel King
- (England) Matthew Wright
- (Australia) Jason Lyons
- (England) James Brundle
- (England) Barry Burchatt
- (United States) Brent Werner
- (England) Andrew Moore
- (England) Ben Powell

2007 team

- (Denmark) Tom P Madsen
- (England) Shaun Tacey
- (Canada) Kyle Legault
- (England) Jason King
- (England) Paul Fry
- (Czech Republic) Tomas Suchanek
- (England) Mark Baseby
- (England) Nicki Glanz

Also Rode:

- (England) Jamie Smith
- (Czech Republic) Mario Jirout

2008 team

- (Poland) Sebastian Truminski
- (Denmark) Jan Graversen
- (Denmark) Casper Wortmann
- (England) Barrie Evans
- (England) Lee Smart
- (England) Paul Lee
- (Germany) Henning Loof

Also Rode:

- (Finland) Kaj Laukkanen
- (Germany) Robbie Kessler
- (Netherlands) Theo Pijper
- (England) Mark Baseby
- (Finland) Jari Makinen
- (England) James Cockle
- (England) Matthew Wright
- (Poland) Michal Rajkowski
- (Poland) Marek Mroz
- (England) Shane Colvin
- (New Zealand) Grant Tregoning (Signed at the start of the season, but did not ride.)

2009 team

- (England) Barrie Evans
- (England) Olly Rayson
- (England) Luke Priest
- (England) Joe Jacobs
- (England) James Birkinshaw
- (England) Nick Laurence
- (Australia) Taylor Poole

2010 team

- (England) Jerran Hart
- (England) Mattie Bates
- (England) Olly Rayson
- (England) Luke Priest
- (England) Barrie Evans
- (England) Nick Laurence
- (England) Joe Jacobs

2011 team

- (Australia) Cameron Heeps
- (England) Jack Hargreaves
- (England) Lewis Blackbird
- (England) Joe Jacobs
- (England) Mark Baseby
- (England) Aaron Baseby
- (England) Danny Halsey

2012 team

- (England) Lewis Blackbird
- (Australia) Cameron Heeps
- (England) Danny Halsey
- (England) Joe Jacobs
- (England) Josh Bates
- (Wales) Nathan Stoneman
- (England) Stefan Nielsen
- (England) Aaron Baseby

2013 team

- (England) Aaron Baseby
- (England) Danny Halsey
- (England) Liam Rumsey
- (England) Jon Armstrong
- (England) Josh Bates
- (Wales) Nathan Stoneman
- (England) Stefan Nielsen
- (England) Ryan Terry-Daley

2014 team

- (England) Brendan Johnson
- (England) Connor Coles
- (England) Connor Mountain
- (England) Danny Halsey
- (England) Jack Kingston
- (England) Joe Jacobs
- (England) Josh Bates

2015 team

- (England) Stefan Farnaby
- (England) Connor Coles
- (England) Connor Mountain
- (England) Danny Halsey
- (England) Jack Kingston
- (Scotland) Luke Ruddick
- (England) Tom Bacon

2019 team

- (England) Ryan Kinsley
- (England) Jason Edwards
- (England) Charlie Brooks
- (England) Henry Atkins
- (Australia) Matt Marson
- (England) Elliot Kelly
- (England) Aaron Butcher

2021 team

- (England) Jason Edwards
- (England) Jordan Jenkins
- (England) Sam Bebee
- (England) Sam Hagon
- (England) Elliot Kelly
- (England) Luke Muff
- (Scotland) Luke Ruddick

2022 team

- (England) Jason Edwards 10.50
- (England) Jack Kingston 7.06
- (England) Sam Bebee 7.02
- (England) James Shanes 7.00
- (England) Alex Spooner 6.83
- (England) Josh Warren 6.21
- (England) Luke Muff 5.88

== Notable riders ==
- (England) Ray Bales
- (England) Carl Blackbird
- (England) Bob Coles
- (England) Derek Harrison
- (England) Robert Henry
- (England) Mick Hines
- (England) Jordan Jenkins
- (England) Dave Jessup
- (England) Richard Knight
- (England) Eric Monaghan
- (England) Melvyn Taylor
