= James Cockle (speedway rider) =

- Born: 26 May 1986 (age 40); Edmonton, England
- Nationality: British (English)

Career history
- 2001–2003: Rye House Rockets
- 2004, 2007: Sheffield Tigers
- 2004: Reading Racers
- 2004–2005: Glasgow Tigers
- 2004–2005: Boston Barracudas
- 2005: Sittingbourne Crusaders
- 2006: Scunthorpe Scorpions
- 2008: Mildenhall Fen Tigers
- 2008–2009: Birmingham Brummies
- 2010: Weymouth Wildcats
- 2011–2012: Plymouth Devils

Team honours
- 2007: Conference League Champion
- 2008: Conference League Pairs champion

James Robert Cockle (born 26 May 1986 in Edmonton, England) is a former professional speedway rider from England.

== Career ==
In just his second season with Rye House Rockets in 2002, Cockle sustained significant injuries in race crash, breaking his leg and missed the remainder of the season.

Cockle was a member of the Scunthorpe Scorpions team that won the Conference League Championship in 2007. In 2008, as a Boston rider, he won the Conference League Pairs Championship, partnering Simon Lambert. The final was held at the Wessex Stadium on 31 May 2008. In 2010, he rode for Weymouth Wildcats during the 2010 National League speedway season, before finishing his career at Plymouth Devils from 2011 to 2012.
