= Joe Jacobs (speedway rider) =

British ex-speedway rider (born 1993)

- Born: 14 August 1993 (age 33); Ipswich, England
- Nationality: British (English)

Career history
- 2009, 2010, 2011, 2012, 2014: Mildenhall Fen Tigers
- 2010: Rye House Cobras
- 2013: Coventry Storm
- 2013: Glasgow Tigers
- 2014: Peterborough Panthers
- 2014: Wolverhampton Wolves
- 2014: Workington Comets
- 2016: Belle Vue Aces
- 2016: Ipswich Witches
- 2016: Isle of Wight Islanders
- 2017: Berwick Bandits

Team honours
- 2011, 2012: National League Knockout Cup
- 2012: National League Fours
- 2012: National League
- 2012, 2014: National League Trophy

Joseph Louis Jacobs (born 14 August 1993) is a former motorcycle speedway rider from England.

== Career ==
Born in Ipswich, Jacobs began riding motorcycles at the age of four, and took up speedway as a junior, riding for Rye House in the Academy League in 2008, finishing as runner up in the British Under-15 Championship that year. He made his senior debut in 2009 with Mildenhall Fen Tigers in the National League, moving to Rye House Cobras in 2010 after the Fen Tigers closed early in the season. That year, he finished as runner up (to Brendan Johnson) in the British Under-18 Championship.

Jacobs returned to the Fen Tigers in 2011 and was part of the Mildenhall team that won the National League Fours, held on 26 August 2012 at Loomer Road Stadium.

Jacobs signed for the newly formed Coventry Storm in 2013.

Jacobs also rode in the Premier League in 2013 for Glasgow Tigers. In 2014, he rode in all three British Leagues, riding for Mildenhall Fen Tigers (NL), Peterborough Panthers then Workington Comets (PL), and Wolverhampton Wolves (Elite League).

Jacobs took a year out of the sport in 2015 but returned in 2016 after being offered an Elite League place with Belle Vue Aces. Following a successful 28-day contract with National League Isle of Wight Islanders as injury cover, Jacobs was signed by Premier League Ipswich Witches in June 2016.

After failing to secure team places for 2017 (although he had a short-term contract mid-season with Berwick Bandits) and 2018, Jacobs announced his retirement from the sport in January 2018.
