= Ben Reade =

British speedway rider

- Born: 27 March 1991 (age 35); Swindon, England
- Nationality: English

Career history
- 2007: Cleveland Bays
- 2008–2014: Plymouth Devils
- 2009–2010: Newport Hornets
- 2011–2013: Stoke Potters
- 2014: Belle Vue Aces

Benjamin William Reade (born 27 March 1991) is a former speedway rider from England.

== Speedway career ==
Reade began his speedway leagues career with the Cleveland Bays in the 2007 Speedway Conference League. Subsequent Conference League seasons were spent with Plymouth Devils and Newport Hornets and Stoke Potters before eventually progressing to the senior ranks with Plymouth during the 2012 Premier League speedway season.

Reade rode in the top tier of British Speedway riding for the Belle Vue Aces during the 2014 Elite League speedway season.
