= NDL Fours =

Speedway competition in Britain

- Sport: motorcycle speedway
- Founded: 2003
- Country: United Kingdom

The NDL Fours formerly the Conference League Four-Team Championship and National League Fours is an annual motorcycle speedway contest between teams competing in the third tier of speedway in the United Kingdom. Teams consisting of four riders from each team are placed in two qualifying groups, and one rider from each team competed in each race. The winners and second place of each group competed for the Championship in the final.

In 2009, the Conference League Four-Team Championship was replaced by the National League Fours and then in 2019 the tournament became known as the National Development League Fours (NDL Fours) for short.

== Winners ==
Year	Winners	2nd place	3rd place	4th place
Conference League Four-Team Championship
2003	Rye House Raiders	Mildenhall Fen Tigers	Peterborough Pumas	Boston Barracuda-Braves
2004	Mildenhall Fen Tigers	Newcastle Gems; Wimbledon Dons	none	Stoke Spitfires
2005	Weymouth Wildcats	Oxford Silver Machine Academy	Armadale Dale Devils	Boston Barracuda-Braves
2006	Stoke Spitfires	Plymouth Devils	Mildenhall Fen Tigers	Scunthorpe Scorpions
2007	Scunthorpe Scorpions	Plymouth Devils	Weymouth Wildcats	Buxton Hitmen
2008	Weymouth Wildcats	Redcar Cubs	Sittingbourne Crusaders	Scunthorpe Saints
National League Fours
2010 - meeting abandoned and not restaged
2011	Dudley Heathens	Belle Vue Colts	Stoke Potters	Mildenhall Fen Tigers
2012	Mildenhall Fen Tigers	Buxton Hitmen	Dudley Heathens	Stoke Potters
2013	Dudley Heathens	Kent Kings	Mildenhall Fen Tigers	King's Lynn Young Stars
2014	Cradley Heathens	Coventry Storm	Mildenhall Fen Tigers	King's Lynn Young Stars
2015	Birmingham Brummies	Coventry Storm	Kent Kings	Rye House Raiders
2016	Rye House Raiders	Belle Vue Colts	Eastbourne Eagles	Cradley Heathens
2017 to 2018 not held
NDL Fours
2019	Stoke Potters	Isle of Wight Warriors	Mildenhall Fen Tigers	Kent Kings
2020 not held due to COVID-19 pandemic
2021 to 2022 not held

== See also ==
- List of United Kingdom Speedway Fours Champions
- Speedway in the United Kingdom
