= Simon Lambert (speedway rider) =

British motorcycle speedway rider

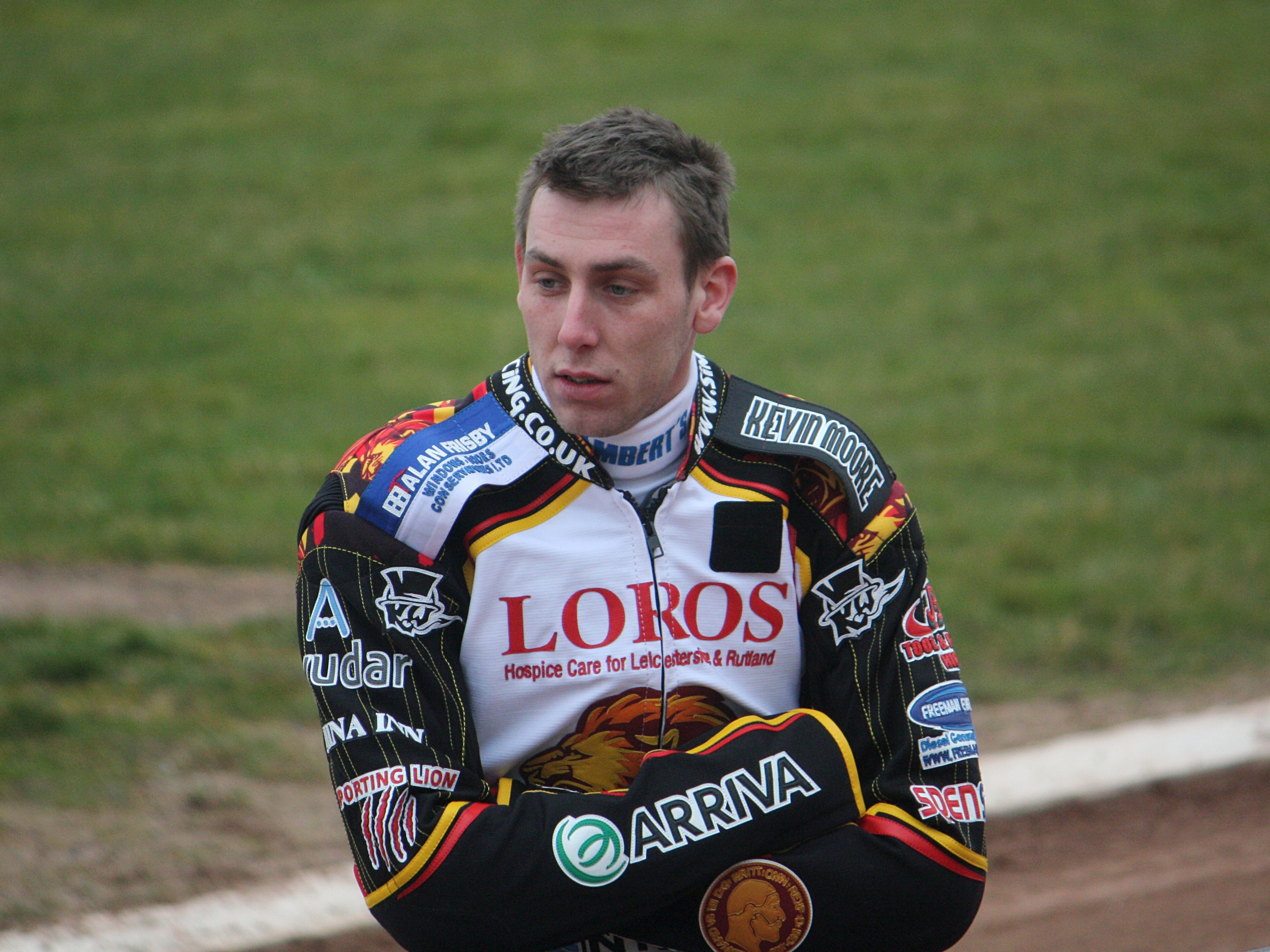
- Born: 21 February 1989 (age 37); Boston, Lincolnshire, England
- Nickname: Rambo Lambo, Rambo
- Nationality: British (English)

Career history
- 2004–2008: Boston Barracudas
- 2004, 2006, 2008, 2010, 2014, 2016–2019, 2023: King's Lynn
- 2009–2010, 2019-2025: Scunthorpe
- 2010–2011: Sheffield Tigers
- 2011: Stoke Potters
- 2012, 2015: Leicester Lions
- 2013–2014: Rye House Rockets
- 2014: Birmingham Brummies
- 2014: Workington Comets
- 2014: Kent Kings
- 2015–2018: Peterborough Panthers
- 2019: Newcastle Diamonds

Team honours
- 2023: Championship Knockout Cup
- 2017: SGB Championship Fours
- 2011: NL Pairs Champion
- 2007, 2008: CL Pairs Champions

Simon James Lambert (born 21 February 1989) in Boston, Lincolnshire, England, is an English motorcycle speedway rider.

== Biography ==
Lambert rode in the Conference League with Boston Barracudas, twice winning the Conference League Pairs Championship. In 2009 and 2010, he rode for Scunthorpe Scorpions in the Premier League. In 2010, he won the Golden Hammer individual meeting at Monmore Green, with a perfect fifteen-point score.

Lambert signed on for the Sheffield Tigers for the 2011 season on a 3.47 starting average, which rose to 5.63 by the end of the season.

Lambert also rode in the National League in 2011 for Stoke Potters, and with Tim Webster won the National League Pairs Championship in June 2011.

In 2012, Lambert signed for Leicester Lions, but lost his place halfway through the season, returning to ride for Stoke Potters in the National League. In August, he returned to the Premier League with Rye House Rockets.

Lambert has been nicknamed 'Rambo' by supporters.

For the 2015 season, Lambert was picked by his former Premier League Club who have stepped up to the Elite League Leicester Lions as one of their Elite League Draft riders while Lambert signed for his local team the Peterborough Panthers in the premier league where he will start the season in one of their reserves berths.

Lambert was part of the Peterborough team that won the SGB Championship Fours, which was held on 6 August 2017, at the East of England Arena.

In 2022, Lambert rode for the Scunthorpe Scorpions in the SGB Championship 2022 and re-signed for the club for the SGB Championship 2023. During the 2023 season, he helped the team win the Knockout Cup.
