= Mildenhall Stadium =

Stadium in Mildenhall, Suffolk

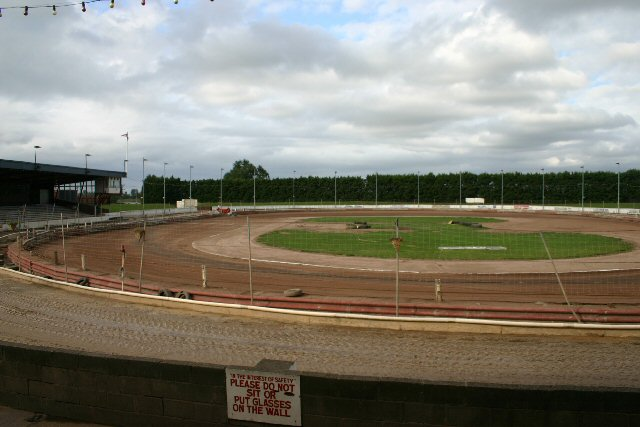
- The speedway track
- Interactive map of Mildenhall Stadium
- Location: Hayland Drove, West Row, IP28 8QU
- Coordinates: 52°22′07″N 0°25′49″E

Construction
- Opened: 1971

Tenants
- Spedeworth International (Stock car racing); Mildenhall Fen Tigers (speedway); Arena Racing Company (greyhound racing)

Mildenhall Stadium is a speedway, stock car racing and Greyhound Board of Great Britain regulated greyhound racing venue located in Mildenhall, Suffolk between Cambridge and Norwich.

The stadium has a Race View Restaurant and a fish and chip shop as well as the Fen Men bar licensed bar. There is a second licensed bar underneath the home straight grandstand. Speedway is held on Sundays (April to October).

== Origins and opening ==
Mildenhall is in an area with strong coursing roots and in later decades greyhound racing became a popular sport too. The market town in Suffolk is surrounded by agricultural land with the only significant landmark near the town being RAF Mildenhall, a Royal Air Force station that opened in 1934. It would take another 37 years before the area experienced speedway.

== History ==
=== Speedway ===
In 1971 a speedway practice track was built on farmland owned by Terry Waters and two years later on the same farmland the track was moved to the south side of the junction where Hayland Drove meets Cooks Drove. The track was extremely primitive with a few sheds used as dressing rooms and straw bales made up the safety fence. In 1975 the Mildenhall Fen Tigers were formed and they entered the National League.

=== Greyhound racing ===
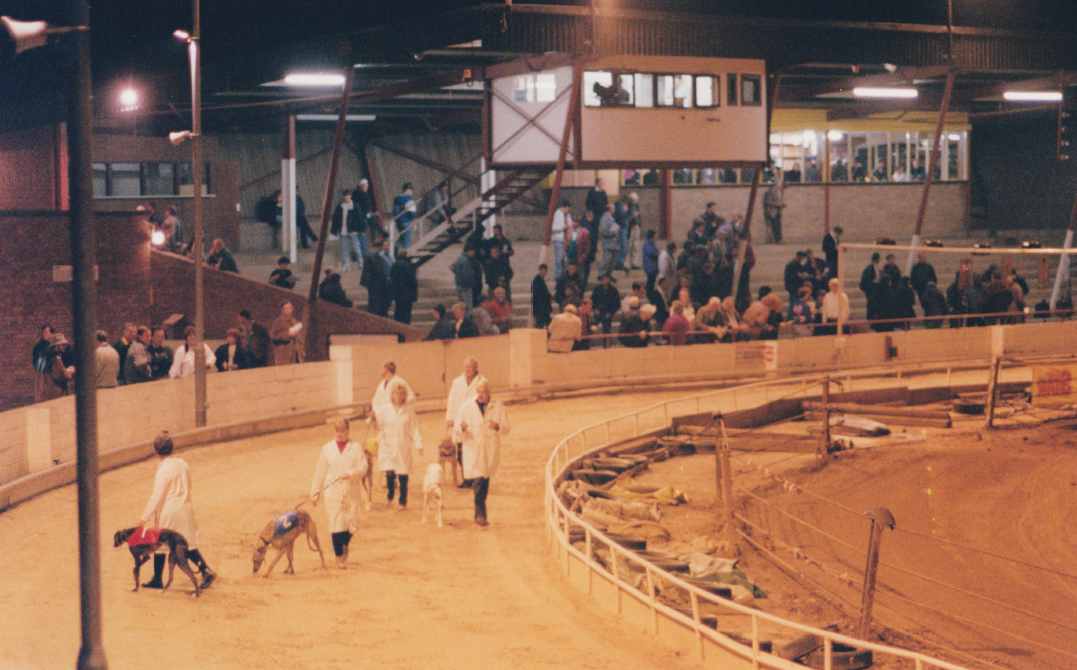
Greyhound racing at Mildenhall Stadium c.1991

In August 1990, Dick Partridge approached Terry Waters regarding a return for speedway and the introduction of greyhound racing. A lease was agreed and the greyhound track was constructed along with improvements in the facilities including new concrete terracing and track lights. The hare was an 'Outside Sumner' and the sand that made the surface was the King's Lynn silica sand. Seventy-four kennels were constructed with a paddock and weighing room added in an area of the old speedway pits. After securing a licence from the National Greyhound Racing Club the first meeting took place on Saturday 21 September 1991. An eight race card started with a 375 metres event that was won by Coppacabana a 3-1 shot trained by Mills in a time of 24.61 secs.

The stadium suffered a two-month closure in the early part of 1992 before re-opening under new management headed by Denis Diffley. In 1995 Terry Waters took over from Dick Partridge who suffered financial difficulties.

One of the sports leading trainers Linda Jones from nearby Lakenheath attended the track regularly whilst establishing the Imperial Kennels. Tuesday and Saturday night racing became regular nights with other race distances in addition to 375 being 550 & 700 metres.

Later the greyhound racing was then overseen by Richard Borthwick and Michael Glynn and new Racing Manager was Michael Hill. Mildenhall underwent changes again with distances being fine-tuned to 220, 375, 545, 700, 870 & 1025 metres on a circumference of 325m. Terry Waters took over as General Manager at the turn of the millennium and in 2008 Dave and Ron Coventry took over followed by Richard Borthwick.

=== Controversy and sale ===
In 2006, a couple bought a house close to Mildenhall Stadium where stock car racing and speedway have taken place since 1975, and began complaining about the noise. The couple took the stadium to court in 2014 and won resulting in the threat of closure for the stadium. In between the track experienced a temporary suspension following the exit of promoter Carl Harris. In 2016, the stadium was sold to Deane Wood of Spedeworth Motorsports.

=== Greyhound racing closure and return ===
Greyhound racing was held every Tuesday and Friday night (all year round) but on 15 January 2018 it was announced that the racing would cease. With the ongoing problems experienced by the track, the majority of its biggest trainers left for Crayford Stadium, Henlow Stadium and Harlow Stadium, which resulted in racing only being held one night per week before the closure. In 2020, Kevin Boothby (the Towcester promoter at the time) announced the return of racing and renamed the stadium Suffolk Downs. The first trial session took place on 12 January 2022.

When racing returned the first meeting was held on 8 February 2022, with the primary race distance being 388 metres. Mark Wallis joined the stadium training ranks during 2023 and won his 14th Greyhound Trainer of the Year title after recording 1591 points.

On 30 July 2024, the stadium suffered a fire which caused significant damage to several areas. The building containing machinery and agricultural vehicles was destroyed and damage was caused to the bar area and offices. The stadium remained closed for the remainder of 2024 and was expected to return in the second half of 2025.

In December 2025, Boothby relinquished the lease to the Arena Racing Company, who reverted the name back to Mildenhall Stadium. The lease was agreed with stadium landlords Spedeworth International Ltd and the management of the lease would be overseen by Simon Franklin, Director of Yarmouth Stadium.

== Current ==
Metres	Greyhound	Time (sec)	Date	Ref
220	Lots of Jolly	13.39	26 October 1983	
388	Saffrons Dash	23.55	13 June 2022	
548	Luna Jezabelle	33.67	27 April 2023	
716	Muxton Lottie	44.99	27 April 2023	

== Former records ==
Extended content

Metres	Greyhound	Time (Sec)	Date	Ref
220	Pams Deema	13.28	14 August 2012	
375	Some Kick	23.90	21 September 1991	
375	Warning Sign	22.76	26 June 2012	
375	Dunmurry Vixen	23.44	26 October 1991	
375	Lots Of Jolly	23.10	11 July 1994	
375	Flashy Beo	22.88	11 October 1996	
388	Mister Eventful	23.70	25 March 2022	
545	Decoy Panther	33.90	12 December 1994	
545	Lady Small Paws	33.76	26 February 2001	
545	Much Approved	33.74	18 May 2004	
545	Newtown Shannon	33.67	8 June 2007	
545	Blackrose Jessie	33.60	19 August 2008	
550	Disenchanted	35.04	26 October 1991	
550	Cathys Hero	34.83	26 November 1991	
550	Dunmurry Brandy	34.72	30 November 1991	
700	Fortunate Man	46.04	17 December 1991	
700	Janes Joy	45.72	17 December 1991	
700	Fortunate Man	45.67	21 December 1991	
700	Take A Flyer	44.90	31 October 1994	
700	Trade Link	44.44	7 October 1999	
700	Bubbly Capel	44.01	8 May 2012	
870	Hillmount Jean	56.53	26 September 1993	
870	Barwise Smiler	56.15	28 September 1998	
1025	Dusty Image	67.49	1 November 1994	
