= 2016 National League speedway season =

British motorcycle speedway season

- League: National League
- Champions: Birmingham Brummies
- Knockout Cup: Eastbourne Eagles
- Individual: Max Clegg
- Fours: Rye House Raiders
- Division/s above: 2016 Elite League; 2016 Premier League

The 2016 National League speedway season was the third tier/division of British speedway.

== Summary ==
The title was won by Birmingham Brummies.

== Final league table ==
Pos	Team	P	W	D	L	4w	3w	D	1L	L	F	A	Pts
1	Birmingham Brummies	22	10	1	0	9	1	0	1	0	1181	779	71
2	Kent Kings	22	10	0	1	5	1	1	3	1	1098	858	58
3	Eastbourne Eagles	21	11	0	0	4	1	0	2	3	1028	856	54
4	Cradley Heathens	22	10	0	1	3	1	0	0	7	1008	947	45
5	Belle Vue Colts	22	9	0	2	1	2	0	4	4	1004	968	41
6	Mildenhall Fen Tigers	21	9	0	2	1	1	0	3	5	939	914	34
7	King's Lynn Young Stars	20	8	0	2	0	1	0	3	6	896	877	30
8	Isle of Wight Islanders	22	7	0	4	1	1	0	1	8	942	1030	29
9	Rye House Raiders	21	6	0	5	0	0	0	3	7	864	1016	21
10	Coventry Storm	20	2	0	7	1	2	0	0	8	768	966	16
11	Stoke Potters	19	3	0	6	1	0	0	0	9	746	925	13
12	Buxton Hitmen	22	3	0	8	0	1	0	0	10	817	1155	12

== Fixtures & results ==
Home \ Away	BV	BIR	BUX	COV	CH	EAS	IOW	KK	KL	MIL	RYE	STO
Belle Vue Colts		34–56	52–38	52–37	50–40	53–37	50–40	40–50	48–42	51–39	56–34	53–37
Birmingham Brummies	45–39		58–32	53–35	55–35	47–43	58–31	45–45	64–26	59–31	60–30	56–34
Buxton Hitmen	37–53	29–61		42–46	39–50	52–38	33–57	32–57	51–39	37–53	52–38	33–57
Coventry Storm	51–39	29–61	44–45		51–39	41–49	43–47	30–60	42–48	28–32	–	–
Cradley Heathens	51–39	41–48	58–32	52–38		50–38	48–42	53–37	45–27	52–38	53–36	60–30
Eastbourne Eagles	51–39	46–43	57–32	54–36	55–35		51–38	47–43	57–33	52–38	48–42	57–33
Isle of Wight Islanders	46–44	37–53	59–31	52–38	44–45	43–47		40–50	53–37	45–44	61–29	53–36
Kent Kings	46–43	41–43	58–32	66–24	58–32	47–42	59–31		44–39	46–44	45–39	56–34
King's Lynn Young Stars	55–35	31–59	62–27	43–47	51–39	–	64–26	46–44		54–35	55–35	65–25
Mildenhall Fen Tigers	48–42	37–52	51–38	61–29	60–29	34–56	62–28	45–44	47–43		47–43	51–39
Rye House Raiders	44–46	36–54	56–34	49–41	38–52	37–53	54–36	34–56	54–36	47–42		48–41
Stoke Potters	44–46	37–51	51–39	22–38	41–49	40–50	54–33	43–46	–	–	48–41	

Legend: Blue = home team win; Yellow = draw; Red = away team win.

== Play-offs ==
Semi-finals
Kent	43	38	81
Eastbourne	47	52	99
Birmingham	53	47	100
Cradley Heath	37	43	80

Grand Final
Eastbourne	50	33	83
Birmingham	47	57	94

Play Off Final

23 October	Eastbourne Eagles; Adam Ellis 12; Georgie Wood 12; Jake Knight 9 Ellis Perks 8 Tom Brennan 7 Charley Powell 2 Gary Cotham R/R	50–47	Birmingham Brummies; Jack Parkinson-Blackburn 9 James Shanes (guest) 8 Tom Bacon 8 Jack Smith 6 Tom Perry 4 Darryl Ritchings 2 Danyon Hume R/R	Arlington Stadium

26 October	Birmingham Brummies; Jack Parkinson-Blackburn 16; Tom Bacon 12; Jack Smith 11; Tom Perry 8 Mitchell Davey (guest) 6 Darryl Ritchings 4 Danyon Hume R/R	57–33	Eastbourne Eagles; Adam Ellis 14; Jake Knight 7 Ellis Perks 5 Tom Brennan 5 Charley Powell 2 Lee Geary 0 Nathan Stoneman (guest) 0 Gary Cotham R/R	Perry Barr Stadium

== National League Knockout Cup ==
The 2016 National League Knockout Cup was the 19th edition of the Knockout Cup for tier three teams. Eastbourne Eagles were the winners for the second successive year.

First round

Date	Team one	Score	Team two
24/04	Mildenhall	48-42	Eastbourne
23/04	Eastbourne	50-38	Mildenhall
24/04	Rye House	37-52	Birmingham
06/04	Birmingham	56-34	Rye House
25/05	Belle Vue	31-35	Stoke
14/05	Stoke	38-52	Belle Vue
02/05	Kent	57-33	Isle of Wight
07/06	Isle of Wight	40-50	Kent

Quarter-finals

Date	Team one	Score	Team two
06/08	Belle Vue	41-48	Birmingham
06/07	Birmingham	54-36	Belle Vue
20/06	Kent	56-34	Coventry
10/06	Coventry	34-56	Kent
29/05	Buxton	44-44	Cradley
14/05	Stoke	38-52	Belle Vue
13/06	Cradley	46-42	Buxton
26/06	Eastbourne	61-28	King's Lynn
22/07	King's Lynn	postponed	Eastbourne

Semi-finals

Date	Team one	Score	Team two
15/10	Eastbourne	62-27	Cradley
27/09	Cradley	44-46	Eastbourne
12/09	Kent	36-54	Birmingham
07/09	Birmingham	49-41	Kent

=== Final ===
19 October	Birmingham Brummies; Jack Smith 14; Jack Parkinson-Blackburn 13; Tom Perry 8 Darryl Ritchings 5 Mitchell Davey (guest) 5 Tom Bacon 3 Danyon Hume R/R	48–42	Eastbourne Eagles; Adam Ellis 15; Ellis Perks 13; Jake Knight 7 Connor Coles (guest) 5 Tom Brennan 1 Luke Harris 1 Gary Cotham R/R	Perry Barr Stadium

30 October	Eastbourne Eagles; Jake Knight 14; Adam Ellis 12; Georgie Wood 9 Tom Brennan 9 Ellis Perks 6 Charley Powell 2 Gary Cotham R/R	52–38	Birmingham Brummies; Jack Parkinson-Blackburn 19; Tom Perry 7 Darryl Ritchings 4 Tom Bacon 4 Jack Smith 4 Zach Wajtknecht 0 Danyon Hume R/R	Arlington Stadium

== Riders' Championship ==
Max Clegg won the Riders' Championship. The final was held on 17 September at Beaumont Park Stadium.

Pos.	Rider	Team	Total
1	Max Clegg	Cradley	14
2	Ben Morley	Rye House	11+3
3	Tom Perry	Birmingham	11+2
4	Luke Bowen	Kent	10
5	Matt Williamson	Belle Vue	9
6	Nathan Greaves	King's Lynn	8
7	Ben Wilson	Stoke	8
8	Lee Payne	Belle Vue	7
9	Ashley Morris	Cradley	7
10	Jake Knight	Eastbourne	7
11	Mark Baseby	Isle of Wight	6
12	Danny Halsey	Mildenhall	6
13	James Shanes	Kent	5
14	Robert Branford	Rye House	4
15	Ryan Blacklock	Buxton	4
16	Chris Widman	Isle of Wight	4
17	Ryan Kinsley	King's Lynn	1
18	Liam Carr	Coventry	0

== Fours ==
Rye House won the National League Fours, held on 14 August 2016 at Brandon Stadium.

Group A
Pos	Team	Pts	Riders
1	Rye House	18	Branford 6, Morley 6, Priest 4, Woods 2
2	Cradley	14	Clegg 5, Andrews 3, Morris 3, Chessell 3
3	Mildenhall	13	Halsey 5, Armstrong 4, Coles 3, Jenkins 1
4	Buxton	3	Geary 2 Becket 1, Dicken 0, Wallinger 0

Group B
Pos	Team	Pts	Riders
1	Eastbourne	17	Perks 6, Ellis 6, Wood 3, Knight 2
2	Belle Vue	17	Bewley 5, Payne 5, Williamson 4, Shuttleworth 3
3	Birmingham	12	Smith 3, Perry 3, Blackburn 3, Bacon 3
4	Coventry	2	Davey 2, Dwyer 0, Carr 0, Terry-Daley 0

Final
Pos	Team	Pts	Riders
1	Rye House	14	Morley 6, Branford 4, Woods 3, Priest 1
2	Belle Vue	12	Bewley 5, Williamson 5, Payne 2, Shuttleworth 0
3	Eastbourne	11	Knight 4, Ellis 3, Wood 3, Perks 1
4	Cradley	7	Morris 4, Clegg 3, Chessell 0, Andrews 0

== Riders and averages ==
Final Leading averages

Rider	Team	Average
Adam Ellis	Eastbourne	10.98
Max Clegg	Cradley	10.08
Robert Branford	Rye House	9.98

Belle Vue Colts

- Matt Williamson 9.49
- Dan Bewley 8.65
- Lee Payne 8.11
- Rob Shuttleworth 6.60
- Tom Woolley 4.90
- Andy Mellish 3.21
- David Holt 3.00
- Joe Lawlor 3.00

Birmingham Brummies

- Zach Wajtknecht 8.59
- Tom Perry
- Tom Bacon 7.95
- Danyon Hume 7.33
- Darryl Ritchings 7.04
- Jack Parkinson-Blackburn 6.97
- Jack Smith 6.32

Buxton Hitmen

- Oliver Greenwood 8.00
- Ben Hopwood 8.00
- Jade Mudgway 7.62
- Ryan Blacklock 5.93
- Lee Dicken 5.87
- Steven Jones 4.96
- Shelby Rutherford 4.45
- Ryan Burton 3.37
- David Wallinger 3.32
- David Speight 3.06
- Lee Geary 3.00

Coventry Storm

- Mitchell Davey 8.43
- Liam Carr 7.71
- Dan Greenwood 6.82
- Martin Knuckey 6.07
- Ryan Terry-Daley 4.55
- Connor Dwyer 4.05
- Jamie Halder 3.57
- Callum Walker 3.45

Cradley Heathens

- Max Clegg 10.08
- Ashley Morris 9.77
- Luke Chessell 8.09
- Jack Kingston 5.84
- Richard Andrews 4.26
- James Purchase 3.59
- Ben Basford 3.09
- Bradley Andrews 3.07

Eastbourne Eagles

- Adam Ellis 10.98
- Kyle Hughes 8.67
- Ellis Perks 8.25
- Jake Knight 8.53
- Ben Hopwood 8.00
- Georgie Wood 7.62
- Richard Andrews 5.18
- Gary Cottham 4.70
- Charley Powell 4.05
- Luke Harris 3.95
- Nick Phillips 3.00

Isle of Wight Islanders

- Benji Compton 8.95
- Joe Jacobs 8.63
- Mark Baseby 7.73
- James Cockle 7.35
- Nathan Stoneman 6.98
- Lee Smart 5.71
- Chris Widman 4.45
- Kelsey Dugard 4.28
- Layne Cupitt 3.00
- George Piper 3.00
- Brendan Johnson 6.21
- Matt Saul 3.00
- Nick Phillips 3.00
- Tyler Govier 3.30

Kent Kings

- Luke Bowen 9.42
- Danny Ayres 8.56
- James Shanes 8.53
- David Mason 6.54
- Jack Thomas 5.83
- Danno Verge 4.43
- Luke Clifton 4.22

King's Lynn Young Stars

- Josh Bailey 8.48
- Nathan Greaves 8.36
- Tom Stokes 7.61
- Scott Campos 6.35
- Shane Hazelden 5.42
- Ryan Kinsley 5.39
- Taylor Hampshire 3.00
- Lewis Whitmore 3.00
- Lewis Austin 3.00
- Layne Cupitt 3.00

Mildenhall Fen Tigers

- Connor Mountain 8.73
- Kyle Hughes 8.67
- Danny Halsey 8.64
- Jon Armstrong 7.82
- Connor Coles 7.11
- Alfie Bowtell 4.21
- Chris Widman 4.15
- Jordan Jenkins 3.00
- Luke Ruddick 3.10
- Robert Parker 3.00

Rye House Raiders

- Robert Branford 9.98
- Ben Morley 9.22
- Luke Priest 8.33
- Ben Hopwood 8.00
- George Hunter 4.00
- Matt Saul 3.00
- Connor Locke 3.00
- Macauley Leek 3.00
- Sam Woods 3.00
- Harvie Banks 3.00
- Kenny Bowdery 3.00

Stoke Potters

- Ben Wilson 8.50
- Tony Atkin 7.16
- Danny Phillips 6.25
- Ben Hopwood 5.83
- Shaun Tedham 3.93
- Chris Widman 3.47
- Paul Burnett 3.46
- Chris Hay 3.23
- Lewis Millar 3.00
- Ryan MacDonald 3.00
- David Morgan 3.00

== Development Leagues ==
=== Midland Development League ===
Group A

Pos	team	P	W	D	L	Pts
1	Buxton	10	7	0	3	14
2	Scunthorpe	12	6	1	5	13
3	Belle Vue	11	4	1	6	9
4	Long Eaton	11	4	0	7	8

Group B

Pos	team	P	W	D	L	Pts
1	Coventry	9	6	0	3	12
2	Mildenhall	8	5	0	3	10
3	King's Lynn	8	4	0	4	8
4	Milton Keynes	11	3	0	8	6

=== Northern Junior League ===
Pos	team	P	W	D	L	Pts
1	Halifax	10	8	2	0	18
2	Northside	10	7	0	3	14
3	Berwick	10	6	1	3	13
4	Workington	10	4	2	4	10
5	Newcastle	10	2	1	7	5
6	Redcar	10	0	0	10	0

== See also ==
- List of United Kingdom Speedway League Champions
- Knockout Cup (speedway)
