= 2017 National League speedway season =

British motorcycle speedway season

- League: National League
- Champions: Belle Vue Colts
- Knockout Cup: Eastbourne Eagles
- Individual: Dan Bewley
- Highest average: Dan Bewley
- Division/s above: SGB Premiership 2017; SGB Championship 2017

The 2017 National League speedway season was the third tier/division of British speedway.

== Summary ==
The title was won by Belle Vue Colts. Eastbourne Eagles finished top of the regular season table.

King's Lynn Young Stars withdrew part way through the season and their results were expunged.

== Final league table ==
Pos	Team	P	W	D	L	4w	3w	D	1L	L	F	A	Pts
1	Eastbourne Eagles	20	9	0	1	4	1	1	1	3	981	799	49
2	Belle Vue Colts	20	10	0	0	2	2	1	1	4	1037	749	47
3	Kent Kings	20	10	0	0	2	2	0	3	3	950	814	47
4	Lakeside Hammers	20	10	0	0	0	1	0	3	6	907	865	36
5	Mildenhall Fen Tigers	20	8	1	1	1	1	1	0	7	878	873	34
6	Birmingham Brummies	20	7	1	2	2	0	1	1	6	898	863	33
7	Cradley Heathens	20	7	1	2	2	0	0	1	7	885	893	31
8	Plymouth Devils	20	7	1	2	0	1	0	0	9	848	911	25
9	Stoke Potters	20	5	1	4	1	0	0	0	9	764	932	20
10	Buxton Hitmen	20	4	0	6	0	1	1	1	7	787	978	18
11	Isle of Wight Islanders	20	5	0	5	0	0	0	0	10	751	1009	15
12	King's Lynn Young Stars	withdrew, results expunged											

== Fixtures & results ==
Home \ Away	BV	BIR	BUX	CH	EAS	IOW	KK	LH	MIL	PLY	STO
Belle Vue Colts		55–35	62–28	56–34	57–33	61–28	53–37	60–30	65–25	57–33	66–24
Birmingham Brummies	43–47		55–35	57–31	45–45	54–36	39–51	46–44	51–39	54–36	51–39
Buxton Hitmen	31–59	39–51		27–62	38–52	66–24	47–43	53–37	40–50	49–40	40–50
Cradley Heathens	56–34	43–43	53–37		43–46	61–29	47–37	48–42	43–46	48–41	54–35
Eastbourne Eagles	53–37	50–39	54–35	51–36		57–33	40–49	47–36	57–33	64–26	58–32
Isle of Wight Islanders	28–62	37–53	44–46	61–29	39–51		47–43	49–41	53–37	42–48	56–33
Kent Kings	46–32	50–40	61–29	56–34	54–36	60–22		45–44	49–41	50–40	45–38
Lakeside Hammers	49–41	52–37	51–38	49–41	49–41	63–27	52–38		44–33	55–35	57–32
Mildenhall Fen Tigers	47–43	54–36	45–45	60–28	46–44	53–37	43–46	55–34		54–35	61–29
Plymouth Devils	45–45	34–25	54–36	39–51	32–52	53–37	47–43	57–32	64–26		52–38
Stoke Potters	44–45	46–44	31–28	47–43	40–50	38–22	43–47	42–46	30–30	53–37	

Legend: Blue = home team win; Yellow = draw; Red = away team win.

== Play-offs ==
**Semi-finals**
Lakeside Hammers	**53**	21	74
**Belle Vue Colts**	37	**69**	106
Kent Kings	**46**	27	73
**Eastbourne Eagles**	44	**63**	107

**Grand Final**
**Belle Vue Colts**	33	**56**	89
Eastbourne Eagles	**45**	34	79

Home team scores are in bold
Overall aggregate scores are in red

Grand Final

14 October	Eastbourne Eagles; Jake Knight 10; Georgie Wood 10; Tom Brennan 8 Josh Bailey 7 Drew Kemp 5 Matt Bates 5 Jason Edwards 0 Charley Powell R/R	45–33	Belle Vue Colts; Dan Bewley 11; Kyle Bickley 9 Jack Smith 7 Luke Woodhull 3 Rob Shuttleworth 3 Andy Mellish 0 Lee Payne R/R	Arlington Stadium

18 October	Belle Vue Colts; Kyle Bickley 14; Jack Smith 14; Dan Bewley 13; Rob Shuttleworth 10; Luke Woodhull 3 Paul Bowen 2 Lee Payne R/R	56–34	Eastbourne Eagles; Jake Knight 10; Georgie Wood 10; Tom Brennan 8 Josh Bailey 7 Drew Kemp 5 Matt Bates 5 Jason Edwards 0 Charley Powell R/R	National Speedway Stadium

== National League Knockout Cup ==
The 2017 National League Knockout Cup was the 20th edition of the Knockout Cup for tier three teams. Eastbourne Eagles were the winners for the third successive year.

=== First round ===
Date	Team one	Score	Team two
01/07	Eastbourne	46-44	Kent
03/06	Stoke	46-44	Buxton
29/05	Kent	42-48	Eastbourne
30/04	Buxton	35-54	Stoke
28/04	Plymouth	51-38	Isle of Wight
27/04	Isle of Wight	43-47	Plymouth

=== Final Stages ===
**Quarter-finals**
**Eastbourne Eagles**	W/O
King's Lynn Young Stars
Birmingham Brummies	**43**	41	84
**Plymouth Devils**	47	**49**	96
**Mildenhall Fen Tigers**	**57**	41	98
Stoke Potters	33	**49**	82
**Belle Vue Colts**	'59	w/o	59
Cradley Heathens	31	scr	31

**Semi-finals**
Plymouth Devils	**50**	25	75
**Eastbourne Eagles**	39	**40**	79
**Mildenhall Fen Tigers**	**53**	39	92
Belle Vue Colts	37	**51**	88

**Final**
**Eastbourne Eagles**	**59**	43	102
Mildenhall Fen Tigers	31	**47**	78

Replay was required in the Quarter-final due to tie
Mildenhall Fen Tigers 50 Stoke Potters 40
Stoke Potters 50 Mildenhall Fen Tigers 40
Mildenhall Fen Tigers 90 Stoke Potters 90

Home team scores are in bold
Overall aggregate scores are in red

KO Cup Final

22 October	Eastbourne Eagles; Josh Bailey 15; Georgie Wood 14; Jake Knight 9 Tom Brennan 9 Charley Powell 6 Matt Bates 4 Jason Edwards 2	59–31	Mildenhall Fen Tigers; Drew Kemp (guest)10 Jon Armstrong 8 Luke Ruddick 7 Jordan Jenkins 4 Luke Harris (guest) 2 Alex Spooner 0 Dan Halsey R/R	Arlington Stadium

29 October	Mildenhall Fen Tigers; Drew Kemp (guest)15 Jordan Jenkins 15; Ben Hopwood (guest) 8 Alfie Bowtell (guest) 6 Alex Spooner 2 Luke Ruddick 1 Dan Halsey R/R	47–43	Eastbourne Eagles; Josh Bailey 11; Jake Knight 10; Georgie Wood 8 Tom Brennan 5 Jason Edwards 5 Charley Powell 4 Matt Bates 0	Mildenhall Stadium

== Riders' Championship ==
Dan Bewley won the Riders' Championship. The final was held on 24 September at Beaumont Park Stadium.

Pos.	Rider	Team	Total
1	Dan Bewley	Belle Vue	15
2	Matt Williamson	Buxton	13
3	Liam Carr	Birmingham	12
4	Tom Bacon	Birmingham	11
5	Ben Morley	Lakeside	11
6	Jordan Jenkins	Mildenhall	10
7	Alfie Bowtell	Lakeside	9
8	Josh Bailey	Eastbourne	8
9	Jon Armstrong	Mildenhall	8
10	Luke Bowen	Kent	7
11	Adam Roynon	Plymouth	4
12	Ryan Terry-Daley	Stoke	3
13	Tom Woolley	Buxton	3
14	Luke Harris	Cradley	3
15	Chris Widman	Isle Of Wight	2
16	Connor Dwyer (res)	Cradley	1
17	James Cockle	Isle Of Wight	0

== Final leading averages ==
Rider	Team	Average
Dan Bewley	Belle Vue Colts	10.96
Zach Wajtknecht	Lakeside	10.84
Steve Boxall	Plymouth	10.02
Ben Morley	Lakeside	9.93
Adam Roynon	Plymouth	9.91

== Riders & final averages ==
Belle Vue Colts

- Dan Bewley 10.96
- Lee Payne 9.09
- Rob Shuttleworth 9.00
- Jack Smith 8.74
- Kyle Bickley 8.00
- Andy Mellish 6.02
- Luke Woodhull 4.52

Birmingham Brummies

- Jack Parkinson-Blackburn 9.35
- Liam Carr 9.00
- Danyon Hume 9.00 (2 matches only)
- Tom Bacon 8.72
- Darryl Ritchings 8.15
- David Mason 6.87
- Layne Cupitt 5.40
- Taylor Hampshire 4.55
- Kyle Roberts 2.29
- Macauley Leek 2.59

Buxton Hitmen

- Max Clegg 9.74
- Matt Williamson 9.50
- Tom Woolley 6.97
- Ryan Kinsley 4.97
- Ben Basford 4.33
- Shelby Rutherford 4.23
- Lee Geary 3.78
- Jamie Halder 3.16
- Ben Woodhull 3.00
- Carl Basford 2.86

Cradley Heathens

- Richard Hall 10.00 (2 matches only)
- Tom Perry 9.41
- Danny Ayres 8.71
- Dan Greenwood 7.69
- Luke Harris 6.37
- Joe Lawlor 5.87
- Conor Dwyer 5.49
- Ryan Burton 5.58
- Shelby Rutherford 3.93
- Tyler Govier 2.00 (2 matches only)

Eastbourne Eagles

- Connor Coles 9.85 (3 matches only)
- Mark Baseby 9.30
- Josh Bailey 9.13
- Jake Knight 9.04
- Georgie Wood 8.06
- Tom Brennan 7.96
- Charley Powell 6.89
- Mattie Bates 6.42
- Kelsey Dugard 5.67

Isle of Wight Warriors

- James Cockle 8.39
- Ben Wilson 8.25
- Connor Coles 6.79
- Scott Campos 6.78
- Chris Widman 4.97
- Adam Portwood 4.51
- Kelsey Dugard 4.00
- Jamie Sealey 2.31

Kent Kings

- Luke Bowen 9.84
- Ben Hopwood 8.26
- Jack Thomas 8.08
- Dan Greenwood 8.00
- Nathan Stoneman 8.00
- Luke Clifton 6.67
- George Hunter 6.39
- Anders Rowe 6.17
- Bradley Andrews 5.80

Lakeside Hammers

- Zach Wajtknecht 10.84
- Ben Morley 9.93
- Paul Hurry 9.50
- Alfie Bowtell 7.51
- George Hunter 4.00
- Connor Locke 3.39
- Nick Laurence 3.28
- Jamie Couzins 3.09

Mildenhall Fen Tigers

- Connor Mountain 9.56
- Danny Halsey 8.00
- Jordan Jenkins 8.00
- Jon Armstrong 7.54
- Luke Ruddick 6.14
- Danno Verge 5.77
- Sam Woods 3.83

Plymouth Devils

- Steve Boxall 10.02
- Adam Roynon 9.91
- Benji Compton 6.81
- Henry Atkins 5.53
- Richard Andrews 5.41
- Callum Walker 4.91
- Lee Smart 4.24
- William O'Keefe 1.85
- Rob Parker 1.67

Stoke Potters

- Mitchell Davey 8.87
- Tony Atkin 7.68
- Lee Dicken 6.91
- David Wallinger 6.50
- Luke Priest 6.05
- Ryan Terry-Daley 5.32
- Paul Burnett 5.08
- Shaun Tedham 4.07
- David Speight 1.00

== Development Leagues ==
=== Midland Development League ===
Pos	team	P	W	D	L	Pts
1	Peterborough	8	9	1	2	12
2	Belle Vue	8	5	0	3	10
3	Scunthorpe	8	4	0	4	8
4	Milton Keynes	8	3	0	5	6
5	Carmarthen Dragons	8	2	0	6	4

=== Northern Junior League ===
Pos	team	P	W	D	L	Pts
1	Berwick	10	7	2	1	16
2	Halifax	10	7	1	2	15
3	Northside	10	6	2	2	14
4	Ashfield	10	4	2	4	10
5	Newcastle	10	1	1	8	3
6	Redcar	10	1	0	9	2

=== Southern Development League ===
Pos	team	P	W	D	L	Pts
1	Reading Racers	8	7	1	0	15
2	Kent Kestrels	8	5	0	3	10
3	Plymouth	8	4	1	3	9
4	Exeter	8	2	0	6	4
5	Weymouth	8	1	0	7	2

== See also ==
List of United Kingdom Speedway League Champions
