= 2015 National League speedway season =

British motorcycle speedway season

- League: National League
- Champions: Birmingham Brummies
- Knockout Cup: Eastbourne Eagles
- National Trophy: Eastbourne Eagles
- Individual: Ben Morley
- Pairs: Kent Kings
- Fours: Birmingham Brummies
- Highest average: Adam Ellis
- Division/s above: 2015 Elite League; 2015 Premier League

The 2015 National League was the seventh season of the National League, the third tier of British speedway. The Cradley Heathens were the defending champions after winning the competition in 2014.

Cradley finished the 2015 season in third place, as the Birmingham Brummies won the championship title. With 14 wins from 18 matches, the Brummies won the title after a 47–42 victory at the Mildenhall Fen Tigers in September, and ultimately finished 6 points clear of the Eastbourne Eagles.

== Teams ==
The 2015 season featured 10 teams, one more than in 2014. The Scunthorpe Stags and Devon Demons did not compete in 2015, whilst the Birmingham Brummies, Eastbourne Eagles and Rye House Raiders all joined the league. National League co-ordinator Peter Morrish expressed his excitement ahead of the new season, with the addition of the Brummies and Eagles especially – two teams with extensive Elite League experience – it was expected to be one of the most exciting National League seasons in years.

== Final league table ==
Pos.	Club	M	Home			Away					F	A	+/−	Pts
Pos.	Club	M	W	D	L	4W	3W	D	1L	L	F	A	+/−	Pts
1	Birmingham Brummies (C)	18	8	0	1	4	2	0	2	1	867	758	+109	48
2	Eastbourne Eagles	18	9	0	0	2	1	1	2	3	908	726	+182	42
3	Cradley Heathens	18	8	0	1	1	2	0	3	3	839	745	+94	37
4	Coventry Storm	18	8	0	1	1	2	0	2	4	816	774	+42	36
5	Rye House Raiders	18	6	1	2	1	2	0	1	5	797	766	+31	30
6	King's Lynn Young Stars	18	7	0	2	0	1	0	0	8	797	847	−50	24
7	Mildenhall Fen Tigers	18	7	0	2	0	0	0	1	8	730	879	−149	22
8	Buxton Hitmen	18	5	0	4	0	1	0	2	6	774	862	−88	20
9	Stoke Potters	18	4	1	4	0	2	0	0	7	765	838	−73	19
10	Kent Kings	18	4	0	5	0	0	1	4	4	766	864	−98	18

== Fixtures & results ==
Home \ Away	BIR	BUX	COV	CH	EAS	KK	KL	MIL	RYE	STO
Birmingham Brummies		52–39	52–40	44–46	46–43	47–43	51–39	51–38	49–39	51–39
Buxton Hitmen	47–43		39–51	51–39	40–50	49–43	45–47	47–43	42–48	49–41
Coventry Storm	42–47	52–41		48–44	57–32	46–42	50–43	55–36	32–19	50–43
Cradley Heathens	40–49	61–31	47–43		48–41	53–40	58–35	56–36	49–41	59–33
Eastbourne Eagles	51–42	49–40	56–36	52–40		58–34	64–24	66–24	54–39	65–27
Kent Kings	40–53	47–45	48–41	38–45	37–55		55–37	52–41	40–49	42–47
King's Lynn Young Stars	40–50	56–37	43–46	46–44	57–36	49–43		57–33	54–38	56–35
Mildenhall Fen Tigers	42–47	47–46	48–42	46–41	46–43	48–41	51–40		46–44	44–46
Rye House Raiders	49–44	49–41	44–45	36–29	44–48	45–45	54–38	55–34		57–33
Stoke Potters	41–49	44–45	50–40	35–40	45–45	56–36	57–36	50–27	43–47	

Legend: Blue = home team win; Yellow = draw; Red = away team win.

== Final Leading averages ==
Rider	Team	Average
Adam Ellis	Birmingham	10.14
Rob Branford	Rye House	10.14
Bradley Wilson-Dean	Eastbourne	9.83

== National League Knockout Cup ==
The 2015 National League Knockout Cup was the 18th edition of the Knockout Cup for tier three teams. Eastbourne Eagles were the winners.

First round

Date	Team one	Score	Team two
12/04	Mildenhall	38-52	King's Lynn
15/04	King's Lynn	54-35	Mildenhall
06/04	Rye House	42-45	Stoke
19/04	Stoke	44-45	Rye House

Quarter-finals

Date	Team one	Score	Team two
19/07	Buxton	51-39	Kings Lynn
21/08	Kings Lynn	53-37	Buxton
16/05	Stoke	35-43	Cradley
27/05	Cradley	57-33	Stoke
20/05	Birmingham	47-42	Eastbourne
21/06	Eastbourne	50-39	Birmingham
11/05	Kent	52-38	Coventry
15/05	Coventry	45-45	Kent

Semi-finals

Date	Team one	Score	Team two
29/06	Kent	28-42	Eastbourne
01.08	Eastbourne	50-40	Kent
07/10	King's Lynn	39-51	Cradley
14/10	Cradley	57-33	King's Lynn

=== Final ===
21 October	Cradley Heathens; Danny Ayres (guest) 9 Arron Mogridge 8 Max Clegg 6 Matt Williamson 4 Jack Smith 2 Tyler Govier 1 Ellis Perks R/R	30–30	Eastbourne Eagles; Marc Owen 7 Richard Andrews 7 Bradley Wilson-Dean 5 Kelsey Dugard 4 Martin Knuckley 4 Ben Hopwood 3 Daniel Spiller R/R	Monmore Green Stadium

24 October	Eastbourne Eagles; Bradley Wilson-Dean 14; Daniel Spiller 7 Richard Andrews 7 George Wood 6 Marc Owen 5 Kelsey Dugard 4 Ben Hopwood 4	47–43	Cradley Heathens; Max Clegg 12; Danny Ayres (guest) 11; Matt Williamson 9 Arron Mogridge 5 Jack Smith 5 Luke Harris 1 Ellis Perks R/R	Arlington Stadium

== Riders' Championship ==
Ben Morley won the Riders' Championship. The final was held on 26 September at Rye House Stadium.

Pos.	Rider	Team	Total
1	Ben Morley	Kent	15
2	Danny Ayres	Kent	12
3	Robert Branford	Rye House	12
4	Kyle Hughes	Rye House	11
5	Adam Ellis	Birmingham	11
6	Liam Carr	Buxton	10
7	Ryan Blacklock	Buxton	10
8	Tom Stokes	King's Lynn	8
9	Danny Halsey	Mildenhall	7
10	Zach Wajtknecht	Birmingham	7
11	Marc Owen	Eastbourne	6
12	Rob Shuttleworth	Coventry	5
13	Jon Armstrong	Stoke	3
14	Connor Mountain	Mildenhall	) 2
15	Lee Payne	Stoke	1
16	Ryan Kinsley	King's Lynn	0

== Pairs ==
The National League Pairs Championship, was held at King's Lynn Stadium, on 5 September 2015. The event was won by Ben Morley and Danny Ayres of the Kent Kings.

Group A
Pos	Team	Pts	Riders
1	Rye House	28	Branford 14, Hughes 14
2	King's Lynn	20	Stokes 13, Bailey 7
3	Eastbourne	15	Wilson-Dean 9, Owen 6
4	Stoke	14	Armstrong 14, Payne 0
5	Coventry	13	Knuckey 11, Baseby 2

Group B
Pos	Team	Pts	Riders
1	Kent	23	Morley 12, Ayres 11
2	Cradley	21	Clegg 12, Perks 9
3	Birmingham	20	Wajtknecht 12, Perry 8
4	Mildenhall	14	Halsey 11, Mountain 3
5	Buxton	12	Carr 7, Blacklock 5

Semi finals

- Kent bt King's Lynn 7–2
- Cradley bt Rye House 7–2

Final

- Kent bt Cradley 7–2

== Fours ==
Birmingham won the National League Fours, held on 14 June 2015 at Brandon Stadium.

Group A
Pos	Team	Pts	Riders
1	Birmingham	18	Ellis 6, Perry 5, Wajtknecht 4, Chapman 3
2	Coventry	14	Greenwood 6, Ritchings 5, Crang 2, Shuttleworth 1
3	Eastbourne	8	Wilson-Dean 4, Owen 3, Mason 1, Andrews 0
4	King's Lynn	7	Kinsley 3, Bailey 2, Sokes 2, Cockle 0

Group B
Pos	Team	Pts	Riders
1	Kent	16	Ayres 5, Morley 5, Baseby 3, Shanes 3
2	Rye House	16	Hughes 6, Priest 5, Chessell 3, Woods 2
3	Cradley	9	Harris 3, Perks 3, Williamson 2, Mogridge 1
4	Mildenhall	7	Halsey 4, Coles 2, Kingston 1, Mountain 0

Final
Pos	Team	Pts	Riders
1	Birmingham	15	Ellis 5, Perry 4, Wajtknecht 4, Chapman 2
2	Coventry	15	Greenwood 6, Ritchings 4, Crang 3, Shuttleworth 2
3	Kent	13	Morley 6, Ayres 3, Baseby 2, Shanes 2
4	Rye House	4	Hughes 2, Chessell 1, Priest 1, Woods 0

- Ellis beat Greenwood in run-off

== Riders & averages ==
Unless otherwise stated, all listed riders were declared at the start of the 2015 National League season.

Birmingham Brummies

- Adam Ellis 10.14
- Zach Wajtknecht 9.51
- Tom Perry 8.58 (Note: Josh Bates replaced Perry for the eleventh declaration of the season. This change was reverted for the thirteenth declaration of the season. Bates replaced Perry once again, for the fourteenth declaration of the season, but the change was reverted for the fifteenth declaration of the season.)
- Josh Bates 8.46
- Sam Chapman 5.18
- Adam Kirby 3.77
- Harvie Banks 3.00
- Alex Wilson 3.00
- Robert Parker 3.00

Buxton Hitmen

- Tony Atkin 8.18
- Ben Hopwood 8.00 (Note: Liam Carr replaced Ben Hopwood for the fourth declaration of the season.)
- Liam Carr 7.73
- Ryan Blacklock 6.84
- Steve Jones 4.96 (Note: Steve Jones replaced Adam Extance for the thirteenth declaration of the season.)
- David Speight 4.69 (Note: David Speight replaced Paul Bowen for the thirteenth declaration of the season.)
- Tom Woolley 4.68
- Adam Extance 4.48
- David Holt 3.44 (Note: David Holt replaced Cameron Hoskins for the fourth declaration of the season.) (Note: Ryan Macdonald replaced David Holt for the twenty-first declaration of the season.)
- Cameron Hoskins 3.00
- Ryan Macdonald 3.00
- Paul Bowen 3.00
- Sam Darroch 3.00 (Note: Ben Basford replaced Sam Darroch for the fourth declaration of the season.)
- Jack Parkinson-Blackburn 3.00 (Note: Buxton Hitmen competed with seven riders for the majority of the season. However, Jack Parkinson-Blackburn was signed for the twenty-first declaration.)

Coventry Storm

- Luke Crang 8.44 (Note: Mark Baseby replaced Luke Crang for the seventeenth declaration of the season.)
- Dan Greenwood 8.29
- Darryl Ritchings 7.32
- Martin Knuckey 6.78
- Rob Shuttleworth 6.23
- Mark Baseby 5.88
- Jamie Halder 3.00
- Conor Dwyer 5.44
- Callum Walker 3.00

Cradley Heathens

- Max Clegg 9.72
- Matt Williamson 8.69
- Ellis Perks 7.14
- Nathan Greaves 7.08
- Arron Mogridge 4.94
- Michael Neale 4.85
- Luke Harris 3.00
- Tyler Govier 3.00

Eastbourne Eagles

- Bradley Wilson-Dean 9.83
- Ben Hopwood 8.00 (Note: Ben Hopwood replaced David Mason for Declaration 9a of the season.)
- Marc Owen 7.25
- Danny Warwick 7.01 (Note: Matthew Bates replaced Danny Warwick for the second declaration of the season.)
- David Mason 6.96
- Daniel Spiller 6.63 (Note: Daniel Spiller replaced Matthew Bates for the nineteenth declaration of the season.)
- Georgie Wood 5.90
- Richard Andrews 5.18
- Mattie Bates 4.86
- Gary Cottham 4.70 (Note: Gary Cottham replaced Kelsey Dugard for the twelfth declaration of the season. This change was reverted for the sixteenth declaration of the season.)
- Kelsey Dugard 4.49
- Niall Strudwick 3.00

Kent Kings

- Ben Morley 9.63
- James Shanes 7.85
- Danny Ayres 7.05
- Aaron Baseby 6.37
- Danno Verge 3.00
- Jamie Couzins 3.00
- Adam Shepherd 3.00
- Ben Basford 3.00 (Note: Kent Kings competed with seven riders for the majority of the season. However, Ben Basford was signed for the eighteenth declaration.)

King's Lynn Young Stars

- James Cockle 8.59 (Note: Jake Knight replaced James Cockle for the twelfth declaration of the season.)
- Tom Stokes 7.10
- Jake Knight 6.00
- Scott Campos 5.65
- Josh Bailey 6.02
- Ryan Kinsley 5.13
- Shane Hazelden 6.00
- Layne Cupitt 3.00
- Adam Portwood 3.00

Mildenhall Fen Tigers

- Danny Halsey 8.24
- Connor Mountain 7.07
- Jack Kingston 5.84
- Connor Coles 5.61
- Tom Bacon 4.42
- Luke Ruddick 3.30
- Liam Rumsey 3.05 (Note: Stefan Farnaby replaced Liam Rumsey for the fifth declaration of the season.)
- Stefan Farnaby 3.00 (Note: Nick Laurence replaced Stefan Farnaby for the fourteenth declaration of the season.)
- Nick Laurence 3.00
- Connor King 3.00

Rye House Raiders

- Robert Branford 10.14
- Kyle Hughes 8.67
- Luke Priest 6.88
- Brendan Johnson 6.21
- Luke Chessell 5.88
- Alfie Bowtell 3.95
- Danyon Hume 3.79 (Note: For the twentieth declaration, Danyon Hume was no longer listed as a rider for the Rye House Raiders. No replacement was announced. Hume returned to the team for the twenty-second declaration.)
- George Hunter 3.47
- Sam Woods 3.27

Stoke Potters

- Lee Payne 8.00
- Jon Armstrong 7.74
- Danny Phillips 6.38
- Chris Widman 4.73
- Ryan Terry-Daley 4.72
- Shaun Tedham 4.50 (Note: Paul Burnett replaced Cameron Hoskins for the fourth declaration of the season.)
- Paul Burnett 4.46
- Sam Ward 3.00

== Development Leagues ==
=== Midland Development League ===
Pos	team	P	W	D	L	Pts
1	King's Lynn	18	13	2	3	28
2	Belle Vue	18	13	1	4	27
3	Buxton	18	11	1	6	23
4	Peterborough	16	10	0	6	20
5	Long Eaton	17	9	1	7	19
6	Coventry	16	6	1	9	13
7	Scunthorpe	18	6	0	12	12
8	Milton Keynes	17	5	1	11	11
9	Wolverhampton	17	5	1	11	11
10	Stoke	16	3	0	13	6

=== Northern Junior League ===
Pos	team	P	W	D	L	Pts
1	Northside	10	8	1	1	17
2	Berwick	10	8	0	2	16
3	Workington	10	5	1	4	11
4	Redcar	10	4	0	6	8
5	Castleford	10	3	0	7	6
6	Newcastle	10	1	0	9	2

== See also ==
- List of United Kingdom Speedway League Champions
- Knockout Cup (speedway)
