= 2018 National League speedway season =

2018 season of third tier British speedway

- League: National League
- Champions: Eastbourne Eagles
- Knockout Cup: Eastbourne Eagles
- National Trophy: Mildenhall Fen Tigers
- Individual: Ben Morley
- Highest average: Tom Bacon
- Division/s above: SGB Premiership 2018; SGB Championship 2018

The National League speedway 2018 was the 2018 season of the third tier/division of British speedway.

Eastbourne Eagles won the playoffs and were declared champions. They completed the double by winning the Knockout Cup.

== Results ==
=== Fixtures ===
Home \ Away	BVC	BRM	BUX	COV	EAS	IOW	KK	MIL	PLY	STK
Belle Vue Colts		40–50	57–32	50–40	46–44	58–32	57–33	43–47	55–35	61–29
Birmingham Brummies	53–36		55–34	43–47	54–36	57–37	45–45	44–46	40–50	63–27
Buxton Hitmen	43–46	44–46			38–52	41–49	40–49	32–58	51–39	38–52
Coventry Bees	59–31	53–36	51–39		51–39	51–39	52–38	40–50	59–31	48–42
Eastbourne Eagles	61–29	49–41	60–30	52–32		51–39	56–31		54–36	67–23
Isle of Wight Warriors	48–42	39–51	58–32	50–40	38–52		42–48	37–53	46–44	60–30
Kent Kings	53–36	46–43	58–31	46–44	32–27	57–33		40–50	53–37	64–26
Mildenhall Fen Tigers	50–28	53–37	55–35	51–39	57–33	42–18	52–38		58–32	60–29
Plymouth Devils	46–44	39–50	57–32	46–44	35–55	54–35	47–43	36–54		48–42
Stoke Potters	37–50	47–42	50–39	29–29	41–49	32–27	36–53	36–53	48–41	

Legend: Blue = home team win; Yellow = draw; Red = away team win.

Teams face each other two times: once home and once away.

The following National League matches were not staged during the 2018 league season
Buxton Hitmen Vs Coventry Bees
Eastbourne Eagles Vs Mildenhall Fen Tigers

=== Table ===
Final National League Table Up To And Including Sunday 28 October

Pos.	Club	M	Home			Away					F	A	Pts	+/−
Pos.	Club	M	W	D	L	4W	3W	D	1L	L	F	A	Pts	+/−
1	Mildenhall Fen Tigers	17	9	0	0	6	2	0	0	0	889	597	57	+292
2	Eastbourne Eagles	17	8	0	0	2	0	0	2	3	843	647	42	+196
3	Kent Kings	18	8	0	1	2	1	1	1	4	827	754	38	+73
4	Birmingham Brummies	18	5	1	3	3	1	0	2	3	846	768	33	+78
5	Coventry Bees	17	8	0	1	0	1	1	2	4	787	704	31	+83
6	Belle Vue Colts	18	7	0	2	1	1	0	2	5	809	792	30	+17
7	Plymouth Devils	18	6	0	3	1	0	0	1	7	753	863	23	-110
8	Isle of Wight Warriors	18	5	0	4	1	0	0	1	7	713	845	20	-132
9	Stoke Potters	18	4	1	4	1	0	0	2	6	656	892	19	-236
10	Buxton Hitmen	17	1	0	7	0	0	0	0	9	631	892	3	-261

Coventry Bees were in fourth place and higher in the league table then Birmingham Brummies at the cut-off date to decide the National League play-off places.

=== Play-Offs ===
**Semi-finals**
**Mildenhall Fen Tigers**	**61**	46	107
Kent Kings	29	**44**	73
**Eastbourne Eagles**	**60**	50	110
Coventry Bees	30	**40**	70

**Grand Final**
Mildenhall Fen Tigers	35	**46**	81
**Eastbourne Eagles**	**54**	44	98

Home team scores are in bold
Overall aggregate scores are in red

=== Semi-finals ===
28 September

Mildenhall Fen Tigers	61–29	Kent Kings	West Row Arena; Referee(s): Darren Hartley

1 October

Kent Kings	44–46	Mildenhall Fen Tigers	Central Park Stadium; Referee(s): Paul Carrington

17 October

Eastbourne Eagles	60–30	Coventry Bees	Arlington Stadium; Referee(s): Christina Turnball

20 October

Coventry Bees	40–50	Eastbourne Eagles	Beaumont Park Stadium; Referee(s): Tony Steele

=== Grand Final ===
21 October

Eastbourne Eagles; Georgie Wood 13; Mark Baseby 12; Tom Brennan 10; Jason Edwards 6 Ethan Spiller 6 Charlie Brooks 5 Charley Powell 2	54–35	Mildenhall Fen Tigers; Drew Kemp 11; Josh Bailey 9 Ryan Kinsley 9 Matt Mason 6 Sam Bebee 0 Kelsey Dugard 0 Jordan Jenkins R/R	Arlington Stadium; Referee(s): Ronnie Allan

25 October

Mildenhall Fen Tigers; Drew Kemp 13; Josh Bailey 10; Ryan Kinsley 10; Nathan Stoneman (guest) 6 Matt Mason 5 Sam Bebee 2 Jordan Jenkins R/R	46–44	Eastbourne Eagles; Georgie Wood 11; Mark Baseby 10; Tom Brennan 7 Charlie Brooks 7 Jason Edwards 5 Ethan Spiller 3 Charley Powell 1	West Row Arena; Referee(s): Paul Carrington

== National League Knockout Cup ==
The 2018 National League Knockout Cup was the 21st edition of the Knockout Cup for tier three teams.

**Preliminary rounds**
**Eastbourne Eagles**	**60**	48	108
Isle of Wight Warriors	30	**42**	72
**Kent Kings**	**56**	57	113
Stoke Potters	34	**31**	65

**Quarter-finals**
**Belle Vue Colts**	**58**	54	112
Buxton Hitmen	32	**36**	68
Birmingham Brummies	**37**	41	78
**Mildenhall Fen Tigers**	34	**49**	83
Coventry Bees	**46**	36	82
**Eastbourne Eagles**	44	**54**	98
Plymouth Devils	**34**	39	73
**Kent Kings**	38	**51**	89

**Semi-finals**
Belle Vue Colts	25	**43**	68
**Mildenhall Fen Tigers**	**65**	47	112
**Eastbourne Eagles**	45	**52**	97
Kent Kings	**45**	38	83

**Final**
Mildenhall Fen Tigers	**52**	32	84
**Eastbourne Eagles**	38	**58**	96

Home team scores are in bold
Overall aggregate scores are in red

First round

20 April

Belle Vue Colts	58–32	Buxton Hitmen	National Speedway Stadium; Referee(s): Darren Hartley

22 April

Buxton Hitmen	36–54	Belle Vue Colts	Hi-Edge Raceway; Referee(s): Phil Griffin

4 June

Kent Kings	56–34	Stoke Potters	Central Park Stadium; Referee(s): Graham Reeve

14 July

Stoke Potters	37–51	Kent Kings	Loomer Road Stadium; Referee(s): Craig Ackroyd

Quarter-finals

20 April

Belle Vue Colts	58–32	Buxton Hitmen	National Speedway Stadium; Referee(s): Darren Hartley

22 April

Buxton Hitmen	36–54	Belle Vue Colts	Hi-Edge Raceway; Referee(s): Phil Griffin

9 May

Birmingham Brummies	37–34	Mildenhall Fen Tigers	Perry Barr Stadium; Referee(s): Ronnie Allan

17 June

Mildenhall Fen Tigers	49–41	Birmingham Brummies	West Row Arena; Referee(s): Craig Ackroyd

26 April

Isle of Wight Warriors	42–48	Eastbourne Eagles	Smallbrook Stadium; Referee(s): Craig Ackroyd

13 May

Coventry Bees	46–44	Eastbourne Eagles	Beaumont Park Stadium; Referee(s): Peter Clarke

20 July

Plymouth Devils	34–38	Kent Kings	St. Boniface Arena; Referee(s): Margaret Vardy

6 August

Kent Kings	51–39	Plymouth Devils	Central Park Stadium; Referee(s): Paul Carrington

Semi-finals

19 August

Mildenhall Fen Tigers	64–25	Belle Vue Colts	West Row Arena; Referee(s): Darren Hartley

14 September

Belle Vue Colts	43–47	Mildenhall Fen Tigers	National Speedway Stadium; Referee(s): Graham Flint

24 September

Kent Kings	45–45	Eastbourne Eagles	Central Park Stadium; Referee(s): Graham Reeve

29 September

Eastbourne Eagles	52–38	Kent Kings	Arlington Stadium; Referee(s): Paul Carrington

Grand Final

12 October

Mildenhall Fen Tigers; Drew Kemp 15; Josh Bailey 12; Ryan Kinsley 9 Jordan Jenkins 7 Sam Bebee 6 Matt Marson 3 Danny Ayres R/R	52–38	Eastbourne Eagles; Tom Brennan 11; Georgie Wood 9 Mark Baseby 9 Charlie Brooks 4 Jason Edwards 3 Ethan Spiller 2 Charley Powell 0	West Row Arena; Referee(s): Chris Gay

13 October

Eastbourne Eagles; Tom Brennan 13; Georgie Wood 12; Ethan Spiller 9 Mark Baseby 7 Charlie Brooks 7 Jason Edwards 6 Charley Powell 4	58–32	Mildenhall Fen Tigers; Drew Kemp 13; Josh Bailey 6 Ryan Kinsley 6 Matt Marson 6 Jordan Jenkins 1 Sam Bebee 0 Danny Ayres R/R	Arlington Stadium; Referee(s): Dave Robinson

== National Trophy ==
Northern Section

Fixtures

Home \ Away	BRM	BUX	COV	CRA	STK
Birmingham Brummies		60–30	53–37	45–45	57–33
Buxton Hitmen	29–61		31–59	32–57	41–48
Coventry Bees	42–48	00–00		40–49	52–38
Cradley Heathens	52–37	68–22	40–49		59–29
Stoke Potters	33–57	56–34	00–00	22–37	

Legend: Blue = home team win; Yellow = draw; Red = away team win.

Teams face each other two times: once home and once away.

Table

National Trophy Northern Section Table Up to And Including Wednesday 1 August

Pos.	Club	M	Home			Away					F	A	Pts	+/−
Pos.	Club	M	W	D	L	4W	3W	D	1L	L	F	A	Pts	+/−
1	Cradley Heathens	8	3	0	1	3	0	1	0	0	407	276	23	+131
2	Birmingham Brummies	8	3	1	0	2	1	0	0	1	418	301	21	+117
3	Coventry Bees	6	1	0	2	2	0	0	0	1	279	259	11	+20
4	Stoke Potters	7	1	0	2	1	0	0	0	3	259	337	7	-78
5	Buxton Hitmen	7	0	0	4	0	0	0	0	3	219	409	0	+190

Southern Section

Fixtures

Home \ Away	EAS	IOW	KK	MIL	PLY
Eastbourne Eagles		56–34	68–21	50–39	49–41
Isle of Wight Warriors	37–53		32–56	31–59	43–47
Kent Kings	00–00	00–00		00–00	46–43
Mildenhall Fen Tigers	46–44	57–33	44–45		00–00
Plymouth Devils	44–46	54–36	46–43	29–61	

Legend: Blue = home team win; Yellow = draw; Red = away team win.

Teams face each other two times: once home and once away.

Table

Final National Trophy Southern Section Table

Pos.	Club	M	Home			Away					F	A	Pts	+/−
Pos.	Club	M	W	D	L	4W	3W	D	1L	L	F	A	Pts	+/−
1	Mildenhall Fen Tigers	8	4	0	0	2	1	0	0	1	450	267	23	+133
2	Eastbourne Eagles	8	4	0	0	1	1	0	1	1	397	321	20	+76
3	Kent Kings	8	3	0	1	1	0	0	1	2	346	368	14	-22
4	Plymouth Devils	8	2	0	2	0	1	0	1	2	329	388	10	-59
5	Isle of Wight Warriors	8	0	0	4	0	0	0	0	4	270	448	0	-178

Grand Final

11 September

Cradley Heathens; Richard Andrews 13; Jason Edwards 7 Kyle Bickley 6 Alfie Bowtell 5 Jack Smith (guest) 5 Ellis Perks 2 James Chattin 1	39–51	Mildenhall Fen Tigers; Max Clegg (guest) 15; Drew Kemp 15; Ryan Kinsley 8 Jordan Jenkins 6 Matt Marson 4 Sam Bebee 3 Josh Bailey R/R	Monmore Green; Referee(s): David Watters

16 September

Mildenhall Fen Tigers; Ben Morley (guest) 9 Drew Kemp 9 Jordan Jenkins 9 Ryan Kinsley 7 Matt Marson 7 Sam Bebee 6 Josh Bailey 2	49–41	Cradley Heathens; Nathan Stoneman (guest) 14; Alfie Bowtell 10; Jason Edwards 7 Tom Brennan (guest) 6 Richard Andrews 3 James Chattin 1 Ellis Perks R/R	West Row Arena; Referee(s): David Watters

== Final leading averages ==
Rider	Team	Average
(England) Tom Bacon	Birmingham	10.54
(England) James Shanes	Birmingham	10.38
(England) Connor Mountain	Coventry	10.18
(England) Luke Bowen	Kent	10.10
(England) Drew Kemp	Mildenhall	9.59

== Riders' Championship ==
Ben Morley won the Riders' Championship for the second time. The final was held on 30 September at Beaumont Park Stadium.

Pos.	Rider	Points	Total
1	Ben Morley	3 2 3 3 3	14+3
2	Alfie Bowtell	3 3 2 3 3	14+2
3	Connor Mountain	3 3 3 3 1	13
4	Jack Thomas	1 1 3 3 2	10
5	Max Clegg	E 3 3 2 0	8
6	Tom Perry	0 1 2 2 3	8
7	Mark Baseby	XD 3 2 1 2	8
8	Georgie Wood	3 2 1 1 1	8
9	Ryan Kinsley	2 2 0 2 1	7
10	Nathan Stoneman	F 1 2 0 3	6
11	Jon Armstrong	2 0 1 2 1	6
12	Tom Woolley	2 1 0 0 2	5
13	Kyle Bickley	2 0 1 1 0	4
14	Henry Atkins	1 2 0 1 0	4
15	Dan Gilkes (res)	1 2	3
16	Sheldon Davies	1 0 0 0 0	1
17	Ben Woodhull (res)	0 0	0
18	Drew Kemp	R FD - - -	0

== Teams and final averages ==
Belle Vue Colts

- (England) Kyle Bickley 8.84
- (England) Jack Smith 8.59
- (England) Tom Perry 8.34
- (England) Joe Lawlor 7.52
- (England) Ben Woodhull 5.71
- (England) Paul Bowen 3.92
- (England) Kean Dicken 2.78

Birmingham Brummies

- (England) Tom Bacon 10.54
- (England) James Shanes 10.38
- (England) Leon Flint 9.10
- (England) Danyon Hume 8.86
- (England) Dan Greenwood 5.33
- (England) Callum Walker 4.68
- (England) Josh Embleton 3.36
- (England) Layne Cupitt 2.22
- (England) Arran Butcher 2.00
- (England) Sheldon Davies 1.80

Buxton Hitmen

- (England) Ben Wilson 8.44
- (England) Tom Woolley 7.33
- (England) Connor Coles 7.18
- (England) David Wallinger 6.18
- (England) Corban Pavitt 3.27
- (England) Lewis Whitmore 2.65
- (Scotland) Kieran Douglas 2.30

Coventry Bees

- (England) Connor Mountain 10.18
- (England) Jon Armstrong 8.21
- (England) Danny Phillips 7.61
- (Scotland) Luke Ruddick 7.42
- (England) Luke Harris 6.82
- (England) Jamie Halder 5.73
- (Scotland) Ryan MacDonald 3.92

Cradley Heathens

- (England) Richard Andrews
- (England) Kyle Bickley
- (England) Alfie Bowtell
- (England) Jason Edwards
- (England) Taylor Hampshire
- (England) Drew Kemp
- (England) Ellis Perks

The Cradley team only took part in the National Trophy competition

Eastbourne Eagles

- (England) Georgie Wood 9.58
- (England) Mark Baseby 9.16
- (England) Tom Brennan 8.70
- (England) Jason Edwards 8.25
- (England) Ethan Spiller 6.80
- (England) Charley Powell 6.45
- (England) Charlie Brooks 6.11
- (England) Kelsey Dugard 5.44

Isle of Wight Warriors

- (England) Alfie Bowtell 9.51
- (England) Ben Morley 9.47
- (England) Ben Hopwood 7.37
- (England) Scott Campos 6.62
- (England) Danny Verge 5.35
- (England) Chris Wildman 4.15
- (England) Shaun Tedham 3.35
- (England) Jamie Bursill 2.50

Kent Kings

- (England) Luke Bowen 10.10
- (England) Jack Thomas 8.55
- (England) Anders Rowe 8.32
- (Wales) Nathan Stoneman 8.17
- (England) Paul Hurry 7.50
- (England) Taylor Hampshire 5.94
- (England) Alex Spooner 5.64
- (England) William O'Keefe 3.20
- (England) Jacob Clouting 1.14

Mildenhall Fen Tigers

- (England) Drew Kemp 9.59
- (England) Danny Ayres 9.37
- (England) Josh Bailey 9.25
- (England) Ryan Kinsley 8.56
- (England) Danny Halsey 8.21
- (England) Jordan Jenkins 8.17
- (England) Sam Bebee 5.86
- (Australia) Matt Marson 5.53

Plymouth Devils

- (England) Adam Roynon 10.00
- (England) Ellis Perks 9.38
- (England) Ben Hopwood 8.42
- (England) Richard Andres 6.75
- (England) Henry Atkins 7.31
- (England) Ryan Terry-Daley 6.21
- (England) Kelsey Dugard 2.44
- (England) Macauley Leek 3.67

Stoke Potters

- (England) Max Clegg 8.72
- (Wales) Tony Atkin 8.00
- (England) David Wallinger 6.56
- (England) Rob Shuttleworth 6.49
- (England) Adam Extance 4.83
- (England) Paul Burnett 4.36
- (England) Joe Alcock 3.38
- (England) Josh Embleton 3.00
- (England) Arran Butcher 1.43

== Development Leagues ==
=== Midland Development League ===
Pos	team	P	W	D	L	Pts
1	Peterborough	8	8	0	0	16
2	Belle Vue Colts	8	4	1	3	9
3	Birmingham	8	3	0	5	6
4	Carmarthen Dragons	8	2	1	5	5
5	Milton Keynes	8	2	0	6	4

=== Northern Junior League ===
Pos	team	P	W	D	L	Pts
1	Berwick	12	12	0	0	24
2	Peterborough	12	8	0	4	16
3	Ashfield	12	5	1	6	11
4	Newcastle	12	5	0	7	10
5	Workington	11	4	0	7	8
6	Redcar	12	3	1	8	7
7	Edinburgh	11	3	0	8	6

=== Southern Development League ===
Pos	team	P	W	D	L	Pts
1	Kent	8	7	0	1	14
2	Reading	8	5	1	3	11
3	Exeter	8	5	0	3	10
4	Isle of Wight	8	2	1	5	5
5	Weymouth	8	0	0	8	0

== See also ==
- List of United Kingdom speedway league champions
