= 2021 National Development League speedway season =

British motorcycle speedway season

- League: National Development League
- Champions: Mildenhall Fen Tigers
- Knockout Cup: not held
- Pairs: not held
- Fours: not held
- Highest average: Dan Gilkes
- Division/s above: SGB Premiership 2021; SGB Championship 2021

The National Development League 2021 is the third tier/division of British speedway for the 2021 season.

Due to pressures caused by the COVID-19 pandemic it was decided that the league would be decided by the final table standings only, with no playoffs being held. For the same reason no Knockout Cup would be held.

== Team changes ==
There were significant changes from the previous 2019 National Development League speedway season. Plymouth Gladiators and Kent Kings moved up a division to the SGB Championship but the latter formed a junior side called the Kent Royals to compete in the development league. The Cradley Heathens had withdrawn after the 2019 season and the Isle of Wight Warriors withdrew from the league in early 2021. Stoke Potters lost their stadium and were unable to compete but there were three teams formed junior sides which joined the league, called the Armadale Devils (parent club Edinburgh Monarchs) the Berwick Bullets (parent club Berwick Bandits) and Eastbourne Seagulls (parent club Eastbourne Eagles).

== Summary ==
Newcastle Gems had started the season but dropped out after in June after a couple of fixtures due to financial difficulties. This was followed on 26 August by the Eastbourne Seagulls after parent club, the Eastbourne Eagles withdrew from the league because of financial problems. Their results were expunged. Mildenhall Fen Tigers won their fourth Division 3 title since 2003.

Locations of the 2021 National League teams

== Final table ==
Pos	Team	P	W	D	L	4W	3W	D	1L	L	F	A	Pts
1	Mildenhall Fen Tigers	10	4	0	1	2	1	1	1	0	488	408	26
2	Berwick Bullets	10	5	0	0	1	0	1	1	2	455	440	22
3	Belle Vue Colts	10	3	0	2	0	1	0	2	2	433	464	14
4	Kent Royals	9	1	0	3	1	1	1	1	1	409	396	13
5	Armadale Devils	9	4	0	1	0	0	0	0	4	385	424	12
6	Leicester Lion Cubs	10	2	3	0	0	0	0	2	3	429	467	11
	Eastbourne Seagulls	withdrew 26 August, results expunged											
	Newcastle Gems	withdrew, results expunged											

== Fixtures & results ==
Home \ Away	ARM	BV	BER	EAS	KR	LEI	MIL	NEW
Armadale Devils		48–42	48–42	n/a	47–43	50–40	34–56	43–46
Belle Vue Colts	51–39		51–38	46–43	39–50	47–42	39–51	n/a
Berwick Bandits	50–40	52–38		n/a	52–38	53–36	46–44	n/a
Eastbourne Eagles	n/a	n/a	n/a		43–46	32–54	n/a	n/a
Kent Royals	n/a	44–46	39–48	45–45		59–31	44–45	n/a
Leicester Lion Cubs	50–40	54–36	45–45	47–43	45–45		45–45	n/a
Mildenhall Fen Tigers	50–39	46–44	61–29	n/a	43–47	47–41		n/a
Newcastle Gems	55–33	n/a	n/a	n/a	n/a	n/a	–n/a	

Legend: Blue = home team win; Yellow = draw; Red = away team win.

The fixture between Kent and Armadale was not held following several postponements.

== National Development League Knockout Cup ==
The 2021 National Development League Knockout Cup would have been the 23rd edition of the Knockout Cup for tier three teams. However it was cancelled due to concerns over the COVID-19 pandemic.

== Teams and final averages ==
=== Armadale Devils ===
- Nathan Greaves 9.03
- Danny Phillips 8.39
- Tom Woolley 7.92
- Archie Freeman 6.86
- George Rothery 5.20
- Gregor Millar 4.30
- Lewis Millar 3.02
- Sheldon Davies 2.29

=== Belle Vue Colts ===
- Jack Smith 8.87
- Benji Compton 8.86
- Harry McGurk 7.35
- Jake Parkinson-Blackburn 7.08
- Connor Coles 6.75
- Paul Bowen 6.00
- Sam McGurk 5.94
- Ben Woodhull 3.45

=== Berwick Bullets ===
- Leon Flint 10.62
- Luke Crang 10.29
- Kyle Bickley 9.25
- Greg Blair 7.91
- Kieran Douglas 5.60
- Ben Rathbone 5.41
- Mason Watson 4.45
- Ryan MacDonald 2.76

=== Kent Royals ===
- Daniel Gilkes 10.96
- Ryan Kinsley 9.26
- Jake Mulford 8.57
- Alex Spooner 7.53
- Jacob Clouting 4.33
- Vinnie Foord 3.33
- Rob Ledwith 4.00
- Josh Warren 3.00
- Jamie Couzins 0.00

=== Leicester Cubs ===
- Dan Thompson 10.04
- Joe Thompson 9.33
- Tom Spencer 7.16
- Joe Lawlor 6.80
- James Chattin 4.00
- Ben Trigger 4.54
- Mickie Simpson 3.83
- Kai Ward 2.35

=== Mildenhall Fen Tigers ===
- Jordan Jenkins 10.24
- Jason Edwards 9.37
- Luke Ruddick 8.44
- Nathan Ablitt 7.05
- Sam Hagon 6.75
- Sam Bebee 6.22
- Elliot Kelly 5.30
- Luke Muff 3.20

== Withdrew and results expunged ==
=== Eastbourne Seagulls ===
- Nathan Ablitt
- Richard Andrews
- Henry Atkins
- Connor King
- Jake Knight
- Nick Laurence
- Danno Verge
- Chad Wirtzfled

=== Newcastle Gems ===
- Joe Alcock
- Max Clegg
- Kelsey Dugard
- Josh Embleton
- Arche Freeman
- Danny Smith
- Ryan Terry-Daley

== See also ==
- List of United Kingdom speedway league champions
- Knockout Cup (speedway)
