= 2019 National Development League speedway season =

British motorcycle speedway season

- League: National Development League
- Champions: Leicester Lion Cubs
- Knockout Cup: Leicester Lion Cubs
- National Trophy: Kent Kings
- Individual: Anders Rowe
- Pairs: Kent Kings
- Fours: Stoke Potters
- Highest average: Max Clegg
- Division/s above: SGB Premiership 2019; SGB Championship 2019

The National League speedway 2019 now known as the National Development League for the 2019 season was the third tier/division of British speedway. There were several team changes for the 2019 league season with reigning league champions and KO cup winners Eastbourne Eagles, along with the Birmingham Brummies, moving into the SGB Championship. Coventry Bees, who rode their home meetings at Leicester the previous season, did not enter the league, but Leicester Lions entered a team (Leicester Lion Cubs). Cradley Heathens fully entered the league after the previous season National Trophy only commitment, while the Buxton Hitmen decided not compete and only run open meetings (friendlies). It was announced on Tuesday 10 September before the end of the 2019 National Development League season that Stoke Potters' home venue at Loomer Road Stadium had been sold and that the team would not be operating in 2020.

== Regulation changes ==
At the Speedway AGM in November 2018, the team averages were reduced to 36.00 points per team.

Locations of the 2019 National League teams

== Results ==
Home \ Away	BVC	CH	IOW	KK	LLC	MIL	PLY	STK
Belle Vue Colts		65–25	56–34	44–45	50–40	64–25	50–40	63–27
Cradley Heathens	42–48		47–43	46–44	39–51	46–44	47–43	48–42
Isle of Wight Warriors	51–39	53–37		51–39	51–38	39–51	42–48	48–42
Kent Kings	47–43	41–37	45–45		40–50	59–31	50–37	53–37
Leicester Lion Cubs	51–38	57–33	57–33	51–39		54–36	59–30	50–40
Mildenhall Fen Tigers	44–46	38–51	50–40	51–38	48–42		53–37	53–37
Plymouth Gladiators	38–52	40–49	46–44	44–46	38–52	44–46		48–41
Stoke Potters	42–48	51–36	45–45	42–44	40–50	51–38	54–36	

Legend: Blue = home team win; Yellow = draw; Red = away team win.

Teams face each other two times: once home and once away.

== Final table ==
Pos.	Club	M	Home			Away					F	A	Pts	+/−
Pos.	Club	M	W	D	L	4W	3W	D	1L	L	F	A	Pts	+/−
1	Leicester Lion Cubs	14	7	0	0	4	0	0	1	2	702	555	38	+147
2	Belle Vue Colts	14	6	0	1	1	1	1	1	1	706	551	32	+155
3	Kent Kings	14	5	1	1	0	3	0	1	3	630	609	26	+21
4	Cradley Heathens	14	5	0	2	1	1	0	0	4	583	650	24	-77
5	Mildenhall Fen Tigers	14	5	0	2	1	1	0	0	5	608	648	23	-40
6	Isle of Wight Warriors	14	5	0	2	0	0	2	2	3	619	640	21	-21
7	Stoke Potters	14	3	1	3	0	0	0	2	5	591	660	12	-69
8	Plymouth Gladiators	14	2	0	5	0	1	0	1	5	569	685	10	-116

== Play-Offs ==
**Semi-finals**
**Leicester Lion Cubs**	53	**64**	117
Cradley Heathens	**37**	26	63
Belle Vue Colts	**47**	36	83
**Kent Kings**	43	**53**	96

**Grand Final**
**Leicester Lion Cubs**	**59**	47	106
Kent Kings	31	**43**	74

Home team scores are in bold
Overall aggregate scores are in red

Semi-finals

2 October

Cradley Heathens	37–53	Leicester Lion Cubs	Perry Barr Stadium; Referee(s): Seth Perkin

5 October

Leicester Lion Cubs	64–26	Cradley Heathens	Beaumont Park Stadium; Referee(s): Dave Watters

4 October

Belle Vue Colts	47–43	Kent Kings	National Speedway Stadium; Referee(s): Craig Ackroyd

7 October

Kent Kings	53–36	Belle Vue Colts	Central Park Stadium; Referee(s): Paul Carrington

Grand Final

16 October

Leicester Lion Cubs; Danyon Hume 16; Ellis Perks 14; Joe Thompson 12; Ryan Terry-Daley 8 Dan Thompson 5 Josh Embleton 4 Luke Ruddick R/R	59–31	Kent Kings; Dan Gilkes 7 Drew Kemp 7 Robert Ledworth 6 Anders Rowe 6 Jake Mulford 3 Alex Spooner 1 Jordan Jenkins 1	Beaumont Park Stadium; Referee(s): Mick Bates

28 October

Kent Kings; Robert Ledworth 11; Dan Gilkes 9 Drew Kemp 9 Jordan Jenkins 7 Jake Mulford 4 Alex Spooner 3 Anders Rowe R/R	43–47	Leicester Lion Cubs; Danyon Hume 13; Ellis Perks 12; Joe Thompson 9 Ryan Terry-Daley 8 Dan Thompson 5 Josh Embleton 0 Luke Ruddick R/R	Central Park Stadium; Referee(s): Chris Gay

== Leading Final Averages ==
Rider	Team	Average
(England) Max Clegg	Cradley	10.36
(England) Ellis Perks	Leicester	10.04
(England) Georgie Wood	Isle of Wight	9.94
(England) Ben Morley	Isle of Wight	9.85
(England) Jordan Palin	Belle Vue	9.76
(England) Danyon Hume	Leicester	9.61
(England) Ben Wilson	Plymouth	9.22
(England) Kyle Bickley	Belle Vue	9.12
(England) Leon Flint	Belle Vue	8.95
(England) Anders Rowe	Kent	8.86

== Knockout Cup ==
The 2019 National Development League Knockout Cup was the 22nd edition of the Knockout Cup for tier three teams.

**Quarter-finals**
**Stoke Potters**	**50**	42	92
Plymouth Gladiators	39	**48**	87
Mildenhall Fen Tigers	34	**52**	86
**Leicester Lion Cubs**	**55**	38	93
**Cradley Heathens**	49	**46**	95
Isle of Wight Warriors	**41**	44	85
Kent Kings	39	**43**	82
**Belle Vue Colts**	**51**	45	96

**Semi-finals**
Stoke Potters	**36**	31	67
**Leicester Lion Cubs**	54	**59**	113
Cradley Heathens	**39**	35	84
**Belle Vue Colts**	45	**55**	100

**Final**
**Leicester Lion Cubs**	**45**	43	88
Belle Vue Colts	27	**47**	74

Home team scores are in bold
Overall aggregate scores are in red

Quarter-finals

6 July

Stoke Potters	50–39	Plymouth Gladiators	Loomer Road Stadium; Referee(s): Michael Breckon

12 July

Plymouth Gladiators	48–42	Stoke Potters	Plymouth Coliseum; Referee(s): Chris Durno

12 May

Leicester Lion Cubs	55–34	Mildenhall Fen Tigers	Beaumont Park Stadium; Referee(s): Phil Griffin

26 May

Mildenhall Fen Tigers	52–38	Leicester Lion Cubs	West Row Arena; Referee(s): Stuart Wilson

9 May

Isle of Wight Warriors	41–49	Cradley Heathens	Smallbrook Stadium; Referee(s): Dave Robinson

20 May

Cradley Heathens	46–44	Isle of Wight Warriors	Monmore Green; Referee(s): Chris Durno

20 June

Belle Vue Colts	51–39	Kent Kings	National Speedway Stadium; Referee(s): Graham Flint

24 June

Kent Kings	43–45	Belle Vue Colts	Central Park Stadium; Referee(s): Christina Turnball

Semi-finals

3 August

Stoke Potters	36–54	Leicester Lion Cubs	Loomer Road Stadium; Referee(s): Chris Durno

5 October

Leicester Lion Cubs	59–31	Stoke Potters	Beaumont Park Stadium; Referee(s): Dave Watters

16 September

Cradley Heathens	39–45	Belle Vue Colts	Monmore Green; Referee(s): Phil Griffin

18 September

Belle Vue Colts	55–35	Cradley Heathens	National Speedway Stadium; Referee(s): Craig Ackroyd

Grand Final

23 October

Leicester Lion Cubs; Joe Thompson 12; Danyon Hume 11; Ellis Perks 8 Dan Thompson 7 Ryan Terry-Daley 6 Josh Embleton 1 Luke Ruddick R/R	45–27	Belle Vue Colts; Kyle Bickley 7 Leon Flint 6 Jordan Palin 4 Connor Bailey 3 Danny Phillips 3 Ben Rathbone 3 Ben Woodhull 1	Beaumont Park Stadium; Referee(s): Graeme Hunter

29 October

Belle Vue Colts; Connor Bailey 12; Leon Flint 11; Kyle Bickley 8 Jordan Palin 7 Danny Phillips 5 Ben Woodhull 4 Ben Rathbone 0	47–43	Leicester Lion Cubs; Dan Thompson 11; Ellis Perks 11; Danyon Hume 10; Joe Thompson 5 Josh Embleton 4 Ryan Terry-Daley 2 Luke Ruddick R/R	National Speedway Stadium; Referee(s): Jim McGregor

== National Trophy ==
=== Results ===
Home \ Away	IOW	KK	MIL	PLY
Isle of Wight Warriors		48–42	49–40	42–48
Kent Kings	54–35		48–41	56–34
Mildenhall Fen Tigers	51–39	41–43		61–29
Plymouth Gladiators	45–45	46–44	41–49	

Legend: Blue = home team win; Yellow = draw; Red = away team win.

Teams face each other two times: once home and once away.

=== Final table ===
Pos.	Club	M	Home			Away					F	A	Pts	+/−
Pos.	Club	M	W	D	L	4W	3W	D	1L	L	F	A	Pts	+/−
1	Kent Kings	6	3	0	0	0	1	1	0	0	287	245	14	+42
2	Mildenhall Fen Tigers	6	2	0	1	1	0	0	0	2	283	249	10	+34
3	Isle of Wight Warriors	6	2	0	1	0	0	1	0	2	258	280	8	-22
4	Plymouth Gladiators	6	1	1	1	0	0	1	0	2	243	297	7	-54

== Riders' Championship ==
Raced at the Eddie Wright Raceway, Scunthorpe on 20 October. The meeting was decided on count back for riders first three rides, after rain prevented the meetings full conclusion. Scores below are from the referee's official National League Riders Individual Championship score sheet.

Pos.	Rider	Team	Total
1	Anders Rowe	Kent Kings	9
2	Drew Kemp	Kent Kings	8
3	Max Clegg	Cradley Heathens	8
4	Ellis Perks	Leicester Lion Cubs	7
5	Leon Flint	Belle Vue Colts	7
6	Ryan Kinsley	Mildenhall Fen Tigers	6
7	Kyle Bickley	Belle Vue Colts	6
8	Ben Morley	Isle of Wight	6
9	Jordan Palin	Belle Vue Colts	3
10	Jason Edwards	Mildenhall Fen Tigers	3
11	Jack Smith	Cradley Heathens	3
12	Tom Spencer (res)	Cradley Heathens	3
13	Joe Thompson	Leicester Lion Cubs	2
14	Connor Coles	Belle Vue Colts	1
15	Danno Verge	Isle of Wight Islanders	1
16	Joe Lawlor	Stoke Potters	0
17	Tom Young	Plymouth Gladiators	0
18	Sam Woods (res)	Unattached	0

== Pairs ==
The National League Pairs Championship, was held at Owlerton Stadium, on 25 August 2019. The event was won by Drew Kemp and Anders Rowe of the Kent Kings.

Group A
Pos	Team	Pts	Riders
1	Leicester	18	Perks 12, Hume 6
2	Kent	18	Kemp 11, Rowe 7
3	Isle of Wight	10	Morley 8, Widman 2
4	Stoke	8	Perry 8, Lawlor 0

Group B
Pos	Team	Pts	Riders
1	Plymouth	18	Wilson 12, Stoneman 6
2	Mildenhall	17	Edwards 9, Kinsley 8
3	Belle Vue	13	Bickley 9, Flint 4
4	Cradley	6	Davies 6, McGurk H 0

Final
Pos	Team	Pts	Riders
1	Kent	19	Kemp 10, Rowe 9
2	Leicester	17	Perks 12, Hume 5
3	Plymouth	10	Stoneman 6, Wilson 4
4	Mildenhall	8	Kinsley 6, Edwards 2

== Fours ==
Stoke won the NDL Fours, held on 13 July 2019 at Loomer Road Stadium.

Group A
Pos	Team	Pts	Riders
1	Stoke	18	Lawlor 6, Coles 5, Priest 4, Perry 3
2	Isle of Wight	14	Morley 6, Verge 4, Wood 3 Wirtzfield 1
3	Leicester	8	Thompson D 4 Thompson J 2, Terry-Daley 1 Hume 1
4	Cradley	8	Smith 4, halsey 3, Spencer 1, McGurk 0

Group B
Pos	Team	Pts	Riders
1	Mildenhall	16	Ayres 6, Atkins 4, Edwards 4, Marson 2
2	Kent	14	Jenkins 6, Kemp 3, Rowe 3, Fellows 2
3	Belle Vue	9	Bailey 3, Palin 3, Bickley 3, Phillips 0
4	Plymouth	8	Wilson 5, Andrews 3, Chessell 0, Wallinger 0

Final
Pos	Team	Pts	Riders
1	Stoke	15	Perry 4, Lawlor 4, Priest 4, Coles 3
2	Isle of Wight	14	Morley 6, Wood 5, Wirtzfield 2, Verge 1
3	Mildenhall	13	Ayres 5, Edwards 5, Atkins 3, Marson 0
4	Kent	6	Kemp 4, Rowe 1, Jenkins 1, Fellows 0

== Teams and final averages ==
Belle Vue Colts

- (England) Jordan Palin 9.76
- (England) Kyle Bickley 9.12
- (England) Leon Flint 8.95
- (Australia) Connor Bailey 8.55
- (England) Danny Phillips 7.07
- (England) Ben Woodhull 4.67
- (England) Ben Rathbone 4.59

7 June Connor Bailey replaced the injured Paul Bowen in the Belle Vue Colts team

Cradley Heathens

- (England) Max Clegg 10.36
- (England) Jack Smith 6.93
- (England) Danny Halsey 6.87
- (England) Luke Harris 6.71
- (England) Tom Spencer 4.60
- (England) Harry McGurk 3.87
- (England) Sheldon Davies 3.13
- (England) Lewis Whitmore 1.14
- (England) Tom Brennan (1 match only)

21 May Jack Smith replaced the injured Tom Brennan in the Cradley Heathens team
6 June Sheldon Davies replaced Lewis Whitmore in the Cradley Heathens team

Isle of Wight Warriors

- (England) Georgie Wood 9.94
- (England) Ben Morley 9.85
- (England) Danno Verge 6.54
- (England) Ryan Terry-Daley 5.60
- (England) Scott Campos 5.36
- (England) Chad Wirtzfeld 4.52
- (England) Chris Widman 4.50
- (England) Connor King 4.47

1 July Scott Campos replaced Ryan Terry-Daley in the Isle of Wight team

Kent Kings

- (England) Anders Rowe 8.86
- (England) Drew Kemp 8.68
- (England) Dan Gilkes 8.53
- (England) Jake Mulford 8.33
- (England) Jordan Jenkins 7.40
- (England) Rob Ledwith 6.22
- (England) Alex Spooner 6.35
- (England) Nathan Ablitt 6.12
- (England) Jacob Clouting 3.63

2 June Jacob Clouting replaced the injured Dan Gilkes in the Kent Kings team
15 August Jake Mulford replaced the injured Nathan Ablitt in the Kent Kings team
6 September Alex Spooner replaced Jacob Clouting in the Kent Kings team

Leicester Lion Cubs

- (England) Ellis Perks 10.04
- (England) Danyon Hume 9.61
- (England) Luke Ruddick 8.44
- (England) Joe Thompson 7.52
- (England) Dan Thompson 6.42
- (England) Ryan Terry-Daley 6.31
- (England) Josh Embleton 6.00
- (Scotland) Ryan MacDonald 3.59

11 April Ryan MacDonald replaced Kelsey Dugard in the Leicester Lion Cubs team
9 July Ryan Terry-Daley replaced the injured Jamie Halder in the Leicester Lion Cubs team
29 August Josh Embleton replaced Ryan MacDonald in the Leicester Lion Cubs team

Mildenhall Fen Tigers

- (England) Danny Ayres 10.57
- (England) Macauley Leek 8.67
- (England) Ryan Kinsley 8.38
- (England) Jason Edwards 8.00
- (England) Charlie Brooks 7.07
- (Australia) Matt Marson 6.40
- (England) Henry Atkins 6.05
- (England) David Wallinger 5.50
- (England) Elliot Kelly 4.30
- (England) Arran Butcher 3.13

16 June Henry Atkins and Arran Butcher replaced the injured Macauley Leek and David Wallinger in the Mildenhall team
13 August Ryan Kinsley replaced the injured Danny Ayres in the Mildenhall Fen Tigers team

Plymouth Gladiators

- (England) Ben Wilson 9.22
- (Wales) Nathan Stoneman 8.81
- (England) Richard Andrews 7.03
- (England) Adam Extance 6.67
- (England) Scott Campos 4.75
- (England) David Wallinger 4.48
- (England) Jamie Bursill 3.71
- (England) Adam Sheppard 3.71
- (England) Luke Chessell 2.29
- (England) Tom Young 2.00
- (England) Kris Andrews 0.57

26 June David Wallinger replaced Scott Campos in the Plymouth team
10 July Luke Chessell replaced the injured Nathan Stoneman in the Plymouth team
28 August Tom Young and Kris Andrews replaced the injured Adam Extance and David Wallinger in the Plymouth team
6 September Nathan Stoneman replaced Luke Chessell in the Plymouth team

Stoke Potters

- (England) Tom Perry 8.71
- (England) Joe Lawlor 8.09
- (England) Connor Coles 8.00
- (England) Luke Priest 6.19
- (England) Joe Alcock 5.27
- (England) Shelby Rutherford 4.73
- (England) Corban Pavitt 2.33
- (England) Kieran Douglas 1.33

9 January Shelby Rutherford replaced Paul Burnett in the Stoke Potters team
9 May Lawlor replaced Luke Chessell in the Stoke Potters team
23 July Corban Pavitt quit the Stoke Potters team for personal reasons
31 August Kieran Douglas replaced Corban Pavitt in the Stoke Potters team

== Development Leagues ==
=== Midland & Southern Development League ===
Pos	team	P	W	D	L	Pts
1	Birmingham Bulls	12	10	0	2	20
2	Exeter	12	8	1	3	17
3	Isle of Wight	12	8	0	4	16
4	Reading Racers	12	7	0	5	14
5	Carmarthen Dragons	12	6	0	6	12
6	Milton Keynes	12	1	1	10	3
7	Weymouth	12	0	2	10	2

=== Northern Junior League ===
Pos	team	P	W	D	L	Pts
1	Newcastle	8	8	0	0	16
2	Berwick	7	4	0	3	8
3	Ashfield	7	3	1	3	7
4	Redcar	8	2	1	5	5
5	Edinburgh	8	1	0	7	2

== See also ==
- List of United Kingdom speedway league champions
