= 2025 National Development League and National Trophy speedway season =

Third tier of 2025 British speedway season

- League: National Development League; National Trophy
- NDL Champions: Oxford Chargers
- National Trophy champions: King's Lynn Young Stars
- Knockout Cup: not held
- Riders' Championship: not held
- Highest average: William Cairns (NDL); Jody Scott (NDT)
- Division/s above: SGB Premiership 2025; SGB Championship 2025

The 2025 National Development League and National Trophy was the third division/tier of British motorcycle speedway for the 2025 season. It was a semi-professional development league, containing mainly the junior sides of SGB Premiership and SGB Championship clubs. Leicester Lion Cubs were the defending champions having won the title in 2024. The league was sponsored by the World Speedway Riders' Association.

== Summary ==
The same six clubs that competed for the 2024 National Development League Championship returned for the 2025 edition. However, an additional competition called the National Trophy was added where five other teams would take part. The league and trophy points limit was set at 38.

Oxford Chargers won the title by a single point from Monarchs Academy, with the bonus point from the meetings between the clubs proving decisive. It was the second time in three years that Oxford were crowned champions.

King's Lynn Young Stars won the debut National Trophy title, dominating the league and winning by seven points.

Locations of the 2025 National Development League and National trophy teams

== NDL ==
=== League table ===
Pos.	Club	M	Home			Away			F	A	B	Pts	+/−
Pos.	Club	M	W	SHL	L	W	SHL	L	F	A	B	Pts	+/−
1	Oxford Chargers (C)	10	5	0	0	3	0	2	505	383	4	20	+112
2	Monarchs Academy	10	5	0	0	3	0	2	449	443	3	19	+6
3	Leicester Lion Cubs	10	3	1	1	3	0	2	465	425	4	17	+40
4	Scunthorpe/Sheffield	10	3	1	1	1	0	4	439	454	2	11	-15
5	Middlesbrough Tigers	10	2	0	3	0	0	5	416	480	1	5	-64
6	Belle Vue Colts	10	1	0	4	1	0	4	405	484	1	5	-79

=== Fixtures & results ===
Home \ Away	BEL	EDI	LEI	MID	OXF	S/S
Belle Vue		44–46	42–48	46–43	32–58	38–52
Edinburgh	49–39		44–40	48–42	48–42	51–39
Leicester	44–45	55–35		51–38	44–44	47–43
Middlesbrough	45–44	43–47	34–56		30–60	55–34
Oxford	54–36	61–29	55–35	48–42		52–38
Scunthorpe/Sheffield	45–39	38–52	45–45	46–44	59–31	

Updated to match(es) played on unknown. Source:
Legend: Blue = home team win; Yellow = draw; Red = away team win.

== Leading averages ==
	Rider	Team	Average
1	(England) William Cairns	Belle Vue	10.87
2	(England) Jody Scott	Oxford	10.82
3	(England) Cooper Rushen	Leicester	10.36
4	(Scotland) Ace Pijper	Middlesbrough	10.14
5	(England) Luke Harrison	Scunthorpe/Sheffield	10.11
6	(England) Nathan Ablitt	Scunthorpe/Sheffield	9.85
7	(England) Darryl Ritchings	Oxford	9.70
8	(Australia) Jordy Loftus	Edinburgh	9.37
9	(England) Max Perry	Leicester	9.14
10	(England) Vinnie Foord	Scunthorpe/Sheffield	9.07

- averages include all league fixtures, min 4 matches

== National Trophy ==
=== League table ===
Pos.	Club	M	Home			Away			F	A	B	Pts	+/−
Pos.	Club	M	W	SHL	L	W	SHL	L	F	A	B	Pts	+/−
1	King's Lynn Young Stars (C)	8	4	0	0	3	0	1	405	303	3	17	+102
2	Leicester Fox Cubs	8	3	0	1	1	0	3	340	364	2	10	-24
3	Kent Eagles	8	3	0	1	0	1	3	322	369	2	9	-47
4	Plymouth Centurions	8	3	0	1	0	0	4	348	364	2	8	-16
5	Birmingham Bulls	8	3	0	1	0	0	4	341	356	1	7	-15

=== Fixtures & results ===
Home \ Away	BIR	KEN	KL	LEI	PLY
Birmingham		44–44	41–48	51–38	48–41
Kent	39–35		31–59	47–41	54–36
King's Lynn	52–38	53–35		54–36	46–44
Leicester	46–44	50–34	31–53		53–37
Plymouth	48–40	51–38	47–40	44–45	

Updated to match(es) played on unknown. Source:
Legend: Blue = home team win; Yellow = draw; Red = away team win.

== Leading averages ==
	Rider	Team	Average
1	(England) Jody Scott	King's Lynn	10.59
2	(England) Cooper Rushen	King's Lynn	10.46
3	(England) Joe Thompson	Plymouth	9.83
4	(England) William Cairns	Leicester	9.67
5	(England) Vinnie Foord	Kent	9.50
6	(England) Luke Harrison	King's Lynn	9.00
7	(England) Ben Morley	Kent	8.90
8	(England) Ben Trigger	Plymouth	8.80
9	(England) Max Perry	King's Lynn	8.74
10	(England) Darryl Ritchings	Birmingham	8.16

- averages include all league fixtures, min 4 matches

== Riders' Championship ==
The National League Riders' Championship did not take place in 2025.

== Squads & final averages ==
Minimum 2 matches

NDL

=== Belle Vue Colts ===
- (England) William Cairns 10.87
- (England) Freddy Hodder 8.74
- (England) Jack Kingston 6.37
- (England) Harry Fletcher 4.21
- (England) Jack Shimelt 3.74
- (England) Mason Watson 3.43
- (England) Billy Budd 3.18

=== Edinburgh Monarchs Academy ===
- (Australia) Jordy Loftus 9.37
- (England) Connor Coles 8.67
- (Australia) Dayle Wood 8.31
- (England) Sam McGurk 7.86
- (Australia) Matt Marson 7.50
- (England) Luke Crang 5.67
- (England) Mark Parker 5.58
- (England) Lee Harrison 3.07
- (England) Kyran Lyden 1.14

=== Leicester Lion Cubs ===
- (England) Cooper Rushen 10.36
- (England) Ben Trigger 9.76
- (England) Max Perry 9.14
- (England) Ryan Ingram 6.12
- (England) Sonny Springer 5.67
- (England) Max James 5.41
- (England) Eli Meadows 4.63
- (England) Harry Fletcher 0.80

=== Middlesbrough Tigers ===
- (Scotland) Ace Pijper 10.14
- (England) Charlie Southwick 7.75
- (England) Tom Spencer 6.92
- (England) Jamie Halder 6.50
- (England) Kai Ward 5.33
- (Scotland) Stene Pijper 5.05
- (England) Ben Rathbone 4.50
- (England) Danny Phillips 4.35
- (England) Elliot Kelly 2.00
- (England) Laylen Richardson 1.14

=== Oxford Chargers ===
- (England) Jody Scott 10.82
- (England) Darryl Ritchings 9.70
- (England) Jacob Clouting 8.41
- (England) Senna Summers 7.91
- (England) Ashton Vale 7.43
- (England) Arran Butcher 6.74
- (England) Max Broadhurst 3.18

=== Scunthorpe/Sheffield Steelers ===
- (England) Luke Harrison 10.11
- (England) Nathan Ablitt 9.85
- (England) Vinnie Foord 9.07
- (England) Mickie Simpson 9.05
- (England) Ben Morley 8.76
- (England) Jamie Etherington 7.14
- (England) Luke Harris 5.39
- (England) Sam Woods 3.65
- (England) Harrison Rogers 2.00

=== Birmingham Bulls ===
- (England) Connor Coles 8.44
- (England) Darryl Ritchings 8.16
- (England) Sam McGurk 7.57
- (England) Tom Spencer 7.29
- (England) Max James 6.44
- (England) Senna Summers 6.18
- (England) Arran Butcher 6.13
- (England) Eli Meadows 4.32
- (England) Joe Crewe 0.57

=== Kent Eagles ===
- (England) Vinnie Foord 9.50
- (England) Nathan Ablitt 9.33
- (England) Ben Morley 8.90
- (England) Jamie Etherington 6.60
- (England) Luke Harris 5.93
- (England) Kenzie Cossey 5.50
- (England) Jacob Clouting 5.09
- (England) Charlie Wood 3.00
- (England) Nathan Hargrave 1.85

=== King's Lynn Young Stars ===
- (England) Jody Scott 10.59
- (England) Cooper Rushen 10.46
- (England) Luke Harrison 9.00
- (England) Max Perry 8.74
- (England) Ashton Vale 4.67
- (England) Calum Mitchell 4.61
- (England) Harrison Rogers 2.00
- (England) Kenzie Cossey 1.50

=== Leicester Fox Cubs ===
- (England) William Cairns 9.67
- (England) Freddy Hodder 9.54
- (Australia) Jordy Loftus 8.89
- (Scotland) Ace Pjper 7.38
- (England) Sonny Springer 7.23
- (England) Harry Fletcher 5.60
- (Scotland) Stene Pijper 5.00
- (England) Mason Watson 4.00
- (England) Max Broadhurst 2.08
- (England) Caydin Martin 0.62

=== Plymouth Centurions ===
- (England) Joe Thompson 9.83
- (England) Ben Trigger 8.80
- (England) Ryan Ingram 6.60
- (England) Mickie Simpson 5.00
- (England) Charlie Southwick 4.94
- (England) Kai Ward 4.50
- (England) Morgan Williams 2.00
- (England) Harley Driscoll-Freeman 1.33

== See also ==
- List of United Kingdom speedway league champions
- Knockout Cup (speedway)
