= Belle Vue Colts =

British speedway team

Belle Vue Colts Speedway Team

Club information
- Track address: National Speedway Stadium; Kirkmanshulme Lane; Gorton; Manchester
- Country: England
- League: National Development League
- Website: official website

Club facts
- Colours: Red, White and Black
- Track size: 347 metres (379 yd)
- Track record time: 58.18 secs (4 laps)
- Track record date: 26 August 2019
- Track record holder: Dan Bewley

Major team honours
National League Champions	2017
British League Champions (Div 2)	1968, 1969
British League Div 2 KO Cup	1969

The Belle Vue Colts are the junior youth development team of the Belle Vue Aces, a notable motorcycle speedway team, based in Manchester.

== History ==
Belle Vue first operated a reserve team during the 1934 Speedway National League which finished 6th in the league table. Three years later in the 1937 Provincial Speedway League the Belle Vue reserve side took over the fixtures of Liverpool Merseysiders and in the 1939 Speedway National League Division Two the Belle Vue reserves replaced Stoke Potters. In the mid-1950s Belle Vue ran a few "second" team events when the Aces were away from home.

The Belle Vue Colts side was formed by former Aces rider Dent Oliver, who became General Manager of Belle Vue Aces in 1967. Oliver's arrival brought sweeping changes to the club's approach as he recognised that if the club was to remain at the very top of British Speedway it needed a way of developing its own young riders. Oliver quickly introduced the now legendary Monday night training schools which he hoped would provide for Belle Vue's future. His efforts brought huge and immediate rewards, with youngsters coming from the north of England to become a part of Belle Vue's roster.

Belle Vue were invited to enter a team of youngsters alongside former provincial league teams like Middlesbrough Bears, Plymouth Devils and Rayleigh Rockets, and the new division began on Wednesday 8 May 1968, with Belle Vue defeating Canterbury 55–23. The Colts went through that maiden season unbeaten at home and clinched the league title on Wednesday 28 August when they beat Weymouth 63-15. One year later, The Colts retained their Second Division title and went one better by adding the Knock-Out Cup to the trophy cabinet. Many of the riders used in those two debut seasons went on to further their careers at first division level.

In 1970, the Belle Vue management looked for a new home for their nursery team, and this was found at Rochdale where the Colts moved — still under the control of Belle Vue — to become the Rochdale Hornets. Rochdale finished third in the 1970 Second Division and reached the semi-finals of the knock-out cup. The Hornets closed after finishing ninth in the 1971 championship, but not before unearthing the biggest talent that the second division was ever to produce: the 16-year-old Peter Collins.

The Belle Vue Colts have continued in various competitions, usually as second half events after the Aces' matches. Notable successes include the 1978 Scottish Junior League title, the 1989 British League 2 Championship and K.O. Cup double and the 2001 and 2002 Northern Youth Development titles. Professional riders Joe Screen, Carl Stonehewer, Scott Smith, Lee Smethills, Ricky Ashworth and James Wright all began as youth prospects with the team.

Since 2016, the team have competed in league competition and currently are part of the 2021 National Development League speedway season. Their track record holder is professional rider Daniel Bewley.

== Season summary ==
Extended content

Year and league	Position	Notes
1934 Speedway National League	6th	Reserve League
1937 Provincial Speedway League	4th	reserve side took over fixtures of Liverpool Merseysiders
1939 Speedway National League Division Two	6th	Belle Vue reserves replaced Stoke Potters
1968 British League Division Two season	1st	Champions
1969 British League Division Two season	1st	Champions & Knockout Cup winners
1997 Speedway Conference League	12th	
2011 National League speedway season	3rd	
2016 National League speedway season	5th	
2017 National League speedway season	2nd	
2018 National League speedway season	6th	
2019 National Development League speedway season	2nd	PO semi finals
2021 National Development League speedway season	3rd	
2022 National Development League speedway season	5th	
2023 National Development League speedway season	3rd	
2024 National Development League speedway season	2nd	
2025 National Development League and National Trophy speedway season	tbc	

== Previous teams ==
Extended content

2019 team

- (England) Jordan Palin
- (England) Leon Flint
- (England) Kyle Bickley
- (Australia) Connor Bailey
- (England) Danny Phillips
- (England) Ben Woodhull
- (England) Ben Rathbone

2021 team

- Jack Smith 8.87
- Benji Compton 8.86
- Harry McGurk 7.35
- Jake Parkinson-Blackburn 7.08
- Connor Coles 6.75
- Paul Bowen 6.00
- Sam McGurk 5.94
- Ben Woodhull 3.45

2022 team

- (England) Jake Mulford 8.72
- (England) Jack Smith 8.67
- (England) Harry McGurk 8.30
- (England) Nathan Ablitt 7.68
- (England) Sam McGurk 6.75
- (England) Archie Freeman 6.31
- (England) Freddie Hodder 5.61

== See also ==
- Category:Belle Vue Colts riders
