= Gareth Isherwood =

British speedway rider

- Born: 28 November 1988 (age 37); Manchester, England
- Nationality: British (English)

Career history
- 2005-2011: Stoke Potters
- 2007-2009: Buxton Hitmen
- 2012: Mildenhall Fen Tigers
- 2013: Dudley Heathens

Gareth Andrew Isherwood (born 28 November 1988, in Manchester) is a former motorcycle speedway rider from Cadishead, Salford, Greater Manchester.

== Career ==
Isherwood started his speedway career with Stoke Spitfires in the 2005 Speedway Conference League. In 2006 and 2007 he continued to represent Stoke but also rode for Buxton Hitmen. In 2008, whilst riding for Buxton, Isherwood won the Gold Cup award which was awarded to their best rider.

In 2010, Isherwood appeared for the Scunthorpe Saints before subsequent seasons for Stoke and Mildenhall Fen Tigers, joining the latter late in the season because of a previous back injury.

Isherwood's final season in 2013 was spent with the Dudley Heathens, where he helped the team win the league, cup and NDL Fours during the 2013 National League speedway season.
