= Benji Compton =

Spanish-British motorcycle speedway rider

- Born: 17 September 1986 (age 40); Tenerife, Spain
- Nationality: Spanish/British

Career history

Great Britain
- 2004: Buxton Hitmen
- 2005, 2008: Scunthorpe Scorpions
- 2006: Sheffield Tigers
- 2007: Berwick Bandits
- 2007: King's Lynn Stars
- 2008, 2009: Redcar Bears
- 2013: Kent Kings
- 2021: Belle Vue Colts

Poland
- 2009: Piła

Individual honours
- 2008: Conference League Riders champion

Team honours
- 2007: Premier Trophy Winner
- 2006: Conference League Pairs champion

Benjamin Mark "Benji" Compton (born 17 September 1986, in Playa de las Américas, Tenerife) is a Spanish-British motorcycle speedway rider.

== Career ==
Compton has ridden for Buxton Hitmen in 2004, Scunthorpe Scorpions in 2005, Sheffield Tigers in 2006. He won the Conference League Pairs Championship, partnering Paul Cooper, held at the Eddie Wright Raceway, on 28 August 2006.

In 2007, Compton rode for Berwick Bandits and King's Lynn Stars. He won the Premier Trophy in 2007 while riding for King's Lynn.

Compton's parent club, Sheffield Tigers, in 2008 granted him permission to ride for Scunthorpe Scorpions who had moved up to the Premier League from the Conference League. Compton had ridden for Scunthorpe in the Conference League from 2005 to 2007. In May 2008, however, it was revealed that Compton would be leaving Scunthorpe as part of team strengthening. Compton subsequently rode for the Redcar Bears for the remainder of the season. In September 2008, Compton won the Conference League Riders' Championship at Rye House with a 14 point tally.

Compton was the first speedway rider with Spanish citizenship to have signed a contract with a Polish club (Polonia Piła for the 2009 season). In August 2009, he joined National League team the Weymouth Wildcats.

Compton took some time out from speedway to concentrate on his budding career in hairdressing, but returned in 2013 with Kent Kings in the National League.

In 2021, Compton rode for the Belle Vue Colts during the 2021 National Development League speedway season.

== Personal life ==
Compton was born in Playa de las Américas, Tenerife, Spain. When he was four years old, his family was moved to Great Britain. He now lives in Bradford, England and has two citizenships; Spanish and British. Compton is the younger brother of former Sheffield Tigers captain Andre Compton.
