= Krzysztof Stojanowski =

Polish speedway rider (born 1979)

- Born: 5 January 1979 (age 47); Sulechów, Poland
- Nationality: Polish

Career history

Poland
- 1998, 2000–2003, 2005: Zielona Góra
- 1999, 2010: Krosno
- 2003: Ostrów
- 2004–2005: Gdańsk
- 2006: Opole
- 2007, 2009: Łódź
- 2008: Gniezno

Great Britain
- 2005–2008: Isle of Wight
- 2008–2009: Swindon

Team honours
- 2007: Premier League Fours Champion

Krzysztof Stojanowski (born 5 January 1979, in Sulechów, Poland) is a former motorcycle speedway rider from Poland.

== Career ==
Stojanowski rode in the Team Speedway Polish Championship for Zielona Góra, Krosno, Ostrów, Gdańsk, Opole, Łódź and Gniezno.

Stojanowski rode for the Isle of Wight Islanders in the British Premier League. Stojanowski was appointed captain on his arrival with the Islanders in 2006. In 2007, he was part of the Isle of Wight four who won the Premier League Four-Team Championship, held on 8 July 2007, at the East of England Arena.

Stojanowski's last season in Britain was with the Swindon Robins in 2009.
