= Nathan Ablitt =

British speedway rider

- Born: 3 March 2004 (age 22); Battle, East Sussex
- Nationality: British (English)

Career history
- 2019, 2023: Kent Kings/Royals
- 2020: Mildenhall Fen Tigers
- 2021: Eastbourne Eagles/Seagulls
- 2022: Poole Pirates
- 2022: Belle Vue Colts
- 2023: Scunthorpe Scorpions

Individual honours
- 2016: British Youth Champion 150cc
- 2018: British Youth Champion 250cc

Team honours
- 2022: tier 2 League champion
- 2022, 2023: tier 2 KO Cup winner
- 2019: tier 3 National Trophy

Nathan Ablitt (born 3 March 2004) is a British motorcycle speedway rider.

== Career ==
On 20 December 2018, it was announced that Ablitt had signed for his first senior club, Kent Kings, and he would ride for them in the National League for the 2019 season. Ablitt helped the Kings win their first-ever piece of the team silverware when they defeated Isle of Wight Warriors in the final of the National Trophy. On 15 August 2019, after sustaining some injuries, Ablitt decided not to race for the remainder of the 2019 season so was replaced in the Kings team by Jake Mulford.

Ablitt signed for Mildenhall Fen Tigers ahead of the 2020 season. However, Ablitt never made an appearance for the Fen Tigers with the 2020 season being cancelled due to the COVID-19 pandemic.

On 8 March 2021, Ablitt signed for his local National League team, Eastbourne Seagulls, who he had also signed for as an asset in August of the previous year. After an impressive start to the season with the Seagulls, Ablitt joined Eastbourne's main team, Eastbourne Eagles who compete in the SGB Championship, as a replacement for Jason Edwards.

In 2022, Ablitt rode for the Poole Pirates in the SGB Championship 2022 and Belle Vue Colts during the 2022 National Development League speedway season. As part of the Poole team, he helped the team retain their tier 2 League and 2 KO Cup double crown.

In 2023, Ablitt was released by Poole but signed for Kent Royals for the 2023 National Development League speedway season. He also signed for Scunthorpe Scorpions for the SGB Championship 2023, where he helped the team win the Knockout Cup.
