= Danny Ayres =

British speedway rider (1986–2020)

- Born: 16 August 1986; Bury St Edmunds, Suffolk
- Died: 1 February 2020 (aged 33)
- Nationality: British (English)

Career history
- 2014–2016: Kent Kings
- 2016: Glasgow Tigers
- 2017: Cradley Heathens
- 2017: King's Lynn Stars
- 2017: Leicester Lions
- 2017: Redcar Bears
- 2018–2019: Mildenhall Fen Tigers
- 2019: Scunthorpe Scorpions

Team honours
- 2015: National League Pairs
- 2016: Premier League Knockout Cup
- 2018: National Trophy

Daniel Stuart Ayres (16 August 1986 – 1 February 2020) was a speedway rider who rode in Great Britain.

== Career ==
Ayres began his career in motocross and converted to speedway relatively late, in 2014. He rode for various teams, including Kent Kings, Glasgow Tigers, King's Lynn Stars, Leicester Lions, Redcar Bears, and Scunthorpe Scorpions. He and Ben Morley were National League Pairs champions in 2015, when Ayres finished second in the 2015 National League Riders' Championship.

The final official averages of 2019 gave Ayres an average of 5.51 on the Scunthorpe Scorpions Championship team.

Ayres was injured in a National League match in August 2019, suffering a broken left tibia. He did not ride again competitively until January 2020. At the time of his death, according to SpeedwayGB, "he [was] preparing for the forthcoming season with Premiership Ipswich [Witches] and Scunthorpe [Scorpions] in the Championship."

== Death ==
Ayres died in February 2020 of suicide. In the East Anglian Daily Times, written after Ayres' death, he was described as being "hugely popular with speedway folk throughout the country for his all-action style." Various people paid tribute, including Scott Nicholls, Scunthorpe Scorpions, Cradley Heathens, and Peterborough Panthers.

No cause of death was announced at the time, but immediately after his death, his partner described it as him having "lost his battle" and encouraged anyone struggling with their mental health to seek help.

At his funeral, on 14 February, the hearse made a final lap of the Mildenhall Fen Tigers' track.
