= Ben Trigger =

English motorcycle speedway rider

- Born: 27 May 2006 (age 20); Plymouth, England
- Nationality: British (English)

Career history
- 2021: Leicester
- 2022–2023: Plymouth
- 2023: Mildenhall
- 2024: Redcar

Team honours
- 2023: Knockout Cup

Ben Trigger (born 27 May 2006) is a motorcycle speedway rider from Plymouth England.

== Career ==
In 2021, Trigger won the British 500cc Youth Championship and signed for the Leicester Lion Cubs for the 2021 National Development League speedway season. In 2022, he signed for Plymouth Centurions for the 2022 National Development League speedway season. He missed some of the season after fracturing his tibia.

After a successful season (despite the injury), Trigger gained a call up to the Plymouth first team and was named in their seven starters for the SGB Championship 2023. He also signed for Mildenhall Fen Tigers for the 2023 NDL season. In 2023, he helped Mildenhall win the Knockout Cup.

Trigger signed for Redcar Bears and their junior side Middlesbrough Tigers for the 2024 season.
