= Anders Rowe =

British speedway rider (born 2002)

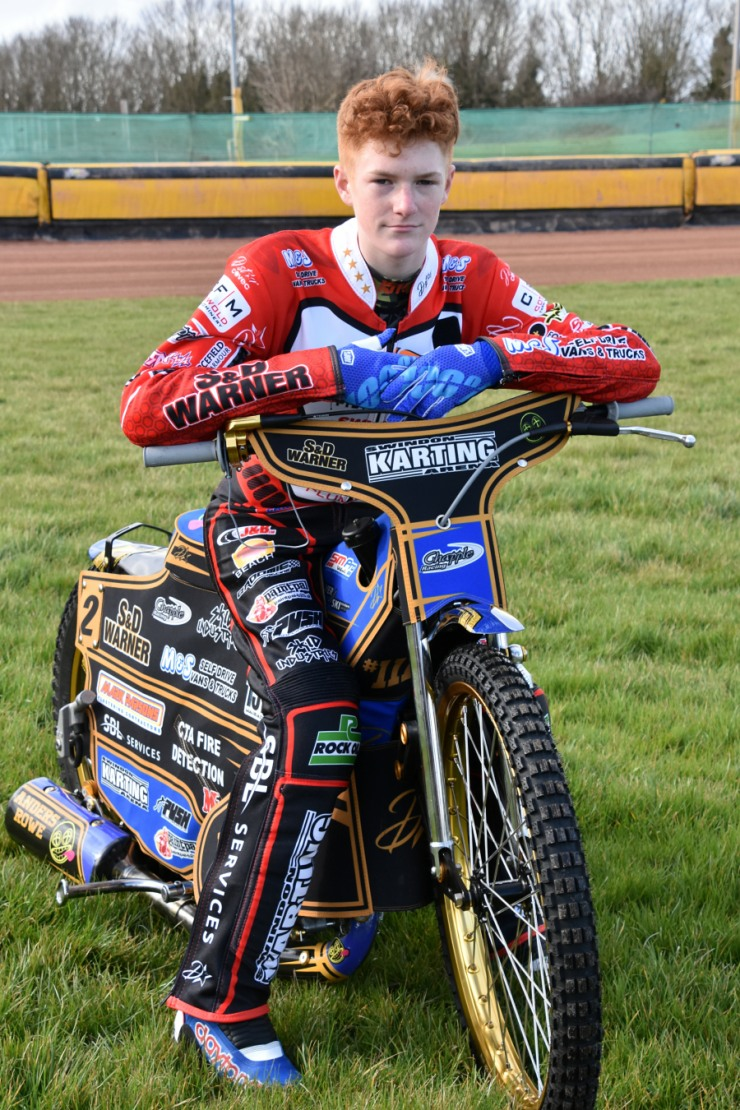
- Born: 9 May 2002 (age 24); Weymouth, Dorset, England
- Nationality: British (English)

Career history

Great Britain
- 2018–2019: Kent Kings
- 2019–2020: Somerset Rebels
- 2021–2022: Ipswich Witches
- 2021: Redcar Bears
- 2022: Leicester Lions
- 2022: Scunthorpe Scorpions
- 2023, 2025: Poole Pirates
- 2023–2024: King's Lynn Stars
- 2025: Sheffield Tigers

Poland
- 2020: Rawicz
- 2022: Gorzów
- 2023: Rzeszów
- 2025: Ostrów

Individual honours
- 2019: National League Riders' Champion

Anders James Rowe (born 9 May 2002) is a motorcycle speedway rider from England.

== Career ==
Rowe started riding speedway when a pupil at the Royal Wootton Bassett Academy. He first rode for the Kent Kings during the 2018 National League speedway season and helped them win the National Trophy and Pairs Championship. He then joined Somerset Rebels for the SGB Championship 2019. That same year, he won the 2019 National League Riders' Championship.

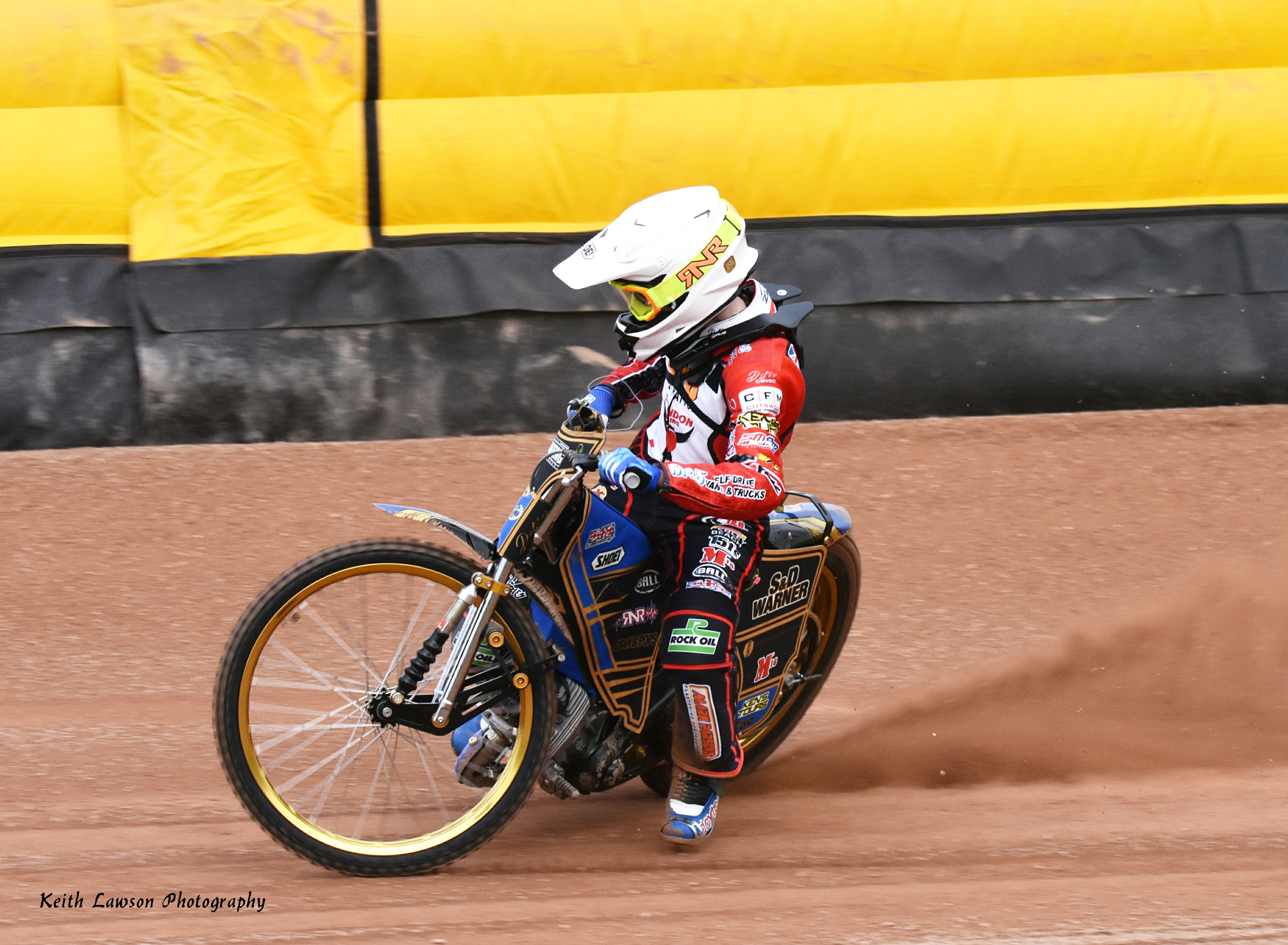
Anders Rowe, riding for Swindon Robins 2018

In 2021, Rowe moved up to the SGB Premiership and started riding for Ipswich Witches, as well as riding in the lower division for Redcar Bears. In 2022, he stayed with the Ipswich Witches in the SGB Premiership 2022 and joined Leicester Lions in the SGB Championship 2022. Later that season, he switched from Leicester to Scunthorpe Scorpions.

In 2023, Rowe rode for Poole Pirates in Great Britain, and Rzeszów in Poland. He also made it into the King's Lynn Stars team in the Premiership as their rising star, a position he retained for the 2024 season.

Rowe signed for Sheffield Tigers for the SGB Premiership 2025. He re-joined Poole Pirates for the SGB Championship 2025.

== Major results ==
=== World individual Championship ===
- 2023 Speedway Grand Prix - =31st
