= Luke Bowen =

British speedway rider

- Born: 26 January 1986 (age 40); Harlow, England
- Nationality: British (English)

Career history
- 2002–2005: Rye House Raiders
- 2006–2008, 2012, 2014–2015: Rye House Rockets
- 2016–2018: Kent Kings

Team honours
- 2007: Premier League Champion
- 2003: Conference League Fours Winner

Luke Alex Bowen (born 26 January 1986 in Harlow, Essex) is a former motorcycle speedway rider from England.

== Career ==
Bowen was with the Hoddesdon-based club Rye House Rockets in the Premier League for much of his career, racing at first with the Rye House Raiders before progressing to the Rockets after overcoming some serious injuries, winning the Premier League Championship in 2007. In 2016, Bowen joined Kent Kings, skippering this National League team and topping the teams' averages from 2016 to 2018.

In 2023, Bowen came out of retirement to ride for the Isle of Wight Warriors in the NBRL.

== Family ==
Bowen's father Kevin also rode for the Rye House Rockets in the early 1980s.
