= Leon Flint =

English motorcycle speedway rider

- Born: 22 February 2003 (age 23); Ashington, Northumberland, England
- Nationality: British (English)

Career history

Great Britain
- 2018, 2024: Birmingham
- 2018: Belle Vue
- 2019, 2021–2023: Berwick
- 2021-2023: Wolverhampton
- 2024–2025: Glasgow
- 2025: Sheffield

Poland
- 2020–2023: Rybnik
- 2025: Landshut

Sweden
- 2022: Valsarna

Individual honours
- 2022: British U21 Champion

Leon Flint (born 22 February 2003) is a motorcycle speedway rider from England.

== Career ==
Flint began his British speedway career riding for Birmingham Brummies during the 2018 National League speedway season. In 2021, he rode in the top tier of British Speedway for the first time, riding for the Wolverhampton Wolves in the SGB Premiership 2021, in addition to riding for the Berwick Bandits in the SGB Championship 2021.

In 2022, Flint rode for Wolverhampton again in the SGB Premiership 2022 and for the Berwick again in the SGB Championship 2022. During the season, he won the 2022 British U21 title. He helped Valsarna win the Allsvenskan during the 2022 Swedish Speedway season.

In 2023, Flint re-signed for Berwick as their club captain for the SGB Championship 2023 and agreed to stay with Wolves for SGB Premiership 2023.

Flint signed for Birmingham (where he began his career) for the 2024 Premiership season and for Glasgow Tigers in the 2024 Championship. In 2024, he qualified for the final series of the 2024 SGP2 (the World U21 Championship) and captained the U21 British team.

Flint signed for Sheffield Tigers for the SGB Premiership 2025.
