= Tom Bacon =

English speedway rider (born 1993)

- Born: 25 February 1993 (age 33); Coventry, West Midlands
- Nationality: British (English)

Career history
- 2015: Mildenhall Fen Tigers
- 2016-18: Birmingham Brummies
- 2017-18: Peterborough Panthers
- 2019: Redcar Bears
- 2021: Wolverhampton Wolves
- 2021: Kent Kings

Thomas Oliver Bacon (born 25 February 1993) is a British former speedway rider.

== Career ==
Bacon began his British career riding for the Mildenhall Fen Tigers in 2015. In 2017, he signed for Peterborough Panthers, where he spent two seasons with the club for the SGB Championship 2017 and the SGB Championship 2018 seasons.

In 2019, Bacon joined Redcar Bears for one season and then rode in the top tier of British Speedway, riding for the Wolverhampton Wolves in the SGB Premiership 2021, in addition to the Kent Kings in the SGB Championship 2021.

Bacon announced his retirement from speedway in 2021.

Joined Nutritics as a Business Development Manager and now works in Account Management
