= Kent Eagles =

British motorcycle speedway team

Kent Eagles formerly Kent Kings & Kent Royals

Club information
- Track address: Central Park Stadium (2013–2021); Iwade Speedway (2022–)
- Country: England
- Founded: 6 May 2013
- League: National Trophy

Club facts
- Colours: Red and white
- Track size: 268m
- Track record time: 57.3s
- Track record date: 6 June 2016
- Track record holder: Dan Greenwood

Current team
| Rider | CMA |
|---|---|
| (England) Ben Morley |
| (England) Nathan Ablitt |
| (England) Vinnie Foord |
| (England) Jacob Clouting |
| (England) Nathan Hargrave |
| (England) Jamie Etherington |
| (England) Luke Harris |

Major team honours
| National League Pairs Champions | 2015, 2019 |
| NDL National Trophy | 2019 |
| National League Riders' Championship | 2013, 2015, 2019 |

The Kent Eagles (formerly the Kent Kings and Kent Royals) are a British motorcycle speedway team formed in 2013. They currently race in the 2025 National Trophy, based at the Iwade Speedway.

== History ==
=== Origins & 2010s ===
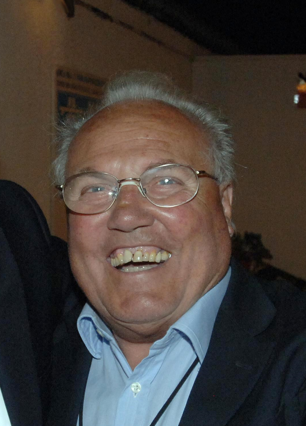
Len Silver

Kent Kings joined the 2013 National League speedway season (third tier), based at Central Park Stadium, with the backing of sponsors CTA Fire and Len Silver co-promoted the team with Roger Cearns. Their participation during the 2013 season saw the return of speedway to Kent for the first time since Sittingbourne Crusaders closed in 2008. The first match for the team was a challenge against the American Touring Team in May 2013, attended by more than 3,000 spectators. The team manager was John Sampford and David Mason was signed as captain, but lost his team place, with Steve Boxall taking over the captaincy. The Kings finished seventh out of eight teams and bottom of the National Trophy. However, the debut season for the Kings saw rider Steve Boxall win the National League Riders' Championship.

The following season in 2014, the Kings finished third of the nine teams competing in the 2014 National League speedway season and reached the semi-final of the cup. A bizarre 2015 campaign ended with the team finishing bottom of the league but with two riders (Ben Morley and Danny Ayres) topping the Riders' Championship and winning the National League Pairs Championship.

The team experienced a gradual improvement, with three consecutive semi-final play off appearances in 2016, 2017 and 2018. Luke Bowen was the clubs top rider during the period. During the 2019 National Development League speedway season the team reached the play off final for the first time, losing to Leicester Lion Cubs in the final. They also won the NDL National Trophy and the Pairs championship, held at Owlerton Stadium, on 25 August, with Anders Rowe and Drew Kemp.

=== 2020s ===
Kent Kings logo

For the 2020 season, Kent Kings entered the SGB Championship (division 2) for the first time and the club also formed a junior team called the Kent Royals to compete in division 3 but the season was cancelled due to COVID-19. However through 2021 they competed in the SGB Championship and the junior team rode in the National League.

In 2022, the club left Central Park Stadium moving to Iwade Speedway, the home of the former Sittingbourne Crusaders. They also raced solely under the name of Kent Royals as a National Development League team.

After missing the 2023 season, the team returned under their traditional name of Kent Kings but chose to race in the NORA Speedway League (a league outside of the control of 'British Speedway'). In 2025, the club announced their intention to race in during the 2025 National Development League and National Trophy speedway season and changed their name to the Kent Eagles.

== Season summary ==
Extended content

| Year and league | Position | Notes |
|---|---|---|
| 2013 National League speedway season | 7th | Kings |
| 2014 National League speedway season | 3rd | Kings |
| 2015 National League speedway season | 10th | Kings |
| 2016 National League speedway season | 2nd | Kings PO semi finals |
| 2017 National League speedway season | 3rd | Kings PO semi finals |
| 2018 National League speedway season | 3rd | Kings PO semi finals |
| 2019 National Development League speedway season | 3rd | Kings PO final |
| SGB Championship 2021 | 8th | Kings |
| 2021 National Development League speedway season | 4th | Royals |
| 2022 National Development League speedway season | 6th | Royals |
| 2024 NORA league | 2nd | Kings |
| 2025 National Trophy | 2nd | Eagles |

== Notable riders ==
- (England) Danny Ayres
- (England) Luke Bowen
- (England) Steve Boxall
- (England) Dan Gilkes
- (England) Drew Kemp
- (England) Ben Morley
- (England) Anders Rowe
