= List of United Kingdom Speedway Pairs champions =

The List of United Kingdom Speedway Pairs Champions is the list of teams and riders who have won the United Kingdom's Pairs Championship that corresponded to the relevant league at the time. The list is split into three divisions, the top tier, the second tier and third tier, all three divisions have been known in various guises such as National League, Premier League, Elite League and many more. This list gives a complete listing of the winners for each season.

During some years there was only one or two divisions.

== Pairs Champions (chronological order) ==
=== Tier One ===
- British League Pairs 1976–1987
- Elite League Pairs 2004–2011
- SGB Premiership Pairs 2017–present

=== Tier Two ===
- British League Division Two Pairs 1975-1994
- Premier League Pairs 1997–2016
- SGB Championship Pairs 2017–present

=== Tier Three ===
- Conference League Pairs 2004–2008
- National League Pairs 2009–present

== List of winners ==
Year	Tier one	Year	Tier two	Year	Tier three
1975	not held	1975	Newcastle Diamonds		
1976	Ipswich Witches	1976	Ellesmere Port Gunners		
1977	Ipswich Witches	1977	Boston Barracudas		
1978	Cradley Heath & Coventry Bees	1978	Ellesmere Port Gunners		
1979	not held	1979	Milton Keynes Knights		
1980	not held	1980	Middlesbrough Tigers		
1981	not held	1981	Canterbury Crusaders		
1982	not held	1982	Weymouth Wildcats		
1983	not held	1983	Weymouth Wildcats		
1984	Belle Vue Aces	1984	Stoke Potters		
1985	Oxford Cheetahs	1985	Ellesmere Port Gunners		
1986	Oxford Cheetahs	1986	Edinburgh Monarchs		
1987	Oxford Cheetahs	1987	Mildenhall Fen Tigers		
1988	not held	1988	Stoke Potters		
1989	not held	1989	Stoke Potters		
1990	not held	1990	Hackney Kestrels		
1991	not held	1991	not held		
1992	not held	1992	not held		
1993	not held	1993	not held		
1994	not held	1994	Swindon Robins		
1995	not held	1995	not held		
1996	not held	1996	not held		
1997	not held	1997	Long Eaton Invaders		
1998	not held	1998	Peterborough Panthers		
1999	not held	1999	Workington Comets		
2000	not held	2000	Workington Comets		
2001	not held	2001	Workington Comets		
2002	not held	2002	Isle of Wight Islanders		
2003	not held	2003	Workington Comets		
2004	Swindon Robins	2004	Reading Racers	2004	Wimbledon Dons
2005	Swindon Robins	2005	Glasgow Tigers	2005	Wimbledon Dons
2006	Belle Vue Aces	2006	Glasgow Tigers	2006	Scunthorpe Scorpions
2007	Poole Pirates	2007	Isle of Wight Islanders	2007	Boston Barracudas
2008	Coventry Bees	2008	Workington Comets	2008	Boston Barracudas
2009	Poole Pirates	2009	Birmingham Brummies	2009	Newport Hornets
2010	Coventry Bees	2010	Sheffield Tigers	2010	Plymouth Devils
2011	Poole Pirates	2011	Glasgow Tigers	2011	Stoke Potters
2012	not held	2012	Workington Comets	2012	Mildenhall Fen Tigers
2013	not held	2013	Somerset Rebels	2013	Dudley Heathens
2014	not held	2014	Edinburgh Monarchs	2014	Stoke Potters
2015	not held	2015	Ipswich Witches	2015	Kent Kings
2016	not held	2016	Somerset Rebels	2016	not held
2017	King's Lynn Stars	2017	Sheffield Tigers	2017	not held
2018	not held	2018	Sheffield Tigers	2018	not held
2019	not held	2019	Glasgow Tigers	2019	Kent Kings
2020	not held	2020	cancelled due to COVID-19	2020	cancelled due to COVID-19
2021	not held	2021	not held	2021	not held
2022	Ipswich Witches	2022	Redcar Bears	2022	Leicester Lion Cubs
2023	Belle Vue Aces	2023	Glasgow Tigers	2023	not held
2024	not held	2024	Redcar Bears	2024	not held
2025	tbc	2025	Redcar Bears	2025	tbc
