= Ben Morley (speedway rider) =

British speedway rider

- Born: 10 March 1994 (age 32); Southend-on-Sea, Essex
- Nationality: British (English)

Career history
- 2009-2012, 2016-2017: Rye House Rockets
- 2011: Hackney Hawks
- 2013-2015, 2021-2025: Kent Kings/Royals
- 2014, 2016-2018: Lakeside Hammers
- 2015: Redcar Bears
- 2018–2019: Isle of Wight Warriors
- 2019: Eastbourne Eagles
- 2022: Birmingham Brummies
- 2022–2023: Plymouth Gladiators
- 2025-present: Kent eagles

Individual honours
- 2015, 2018: National League Riders Champion

Team honours
- 2015: National League Pairs
- 2016: National League Fours

Benjamin (Ben) Morley (born 10 March 1994) is a British speedway rider.

== Career ==
Morley won the National League Riders' Championship, held on 26 September 2015 at Rye House Stadium. The following season, he was part of the Rye House Raiders team that won the National League Fours, held on 14 August 2016 at Brandon Stadium.

Morley rode for Isle of Wight Warriors in the National League for the second successive season in 2019. He also joined Eastbourne Eagles on 22 December 2018, with the Eagles moving up to the SGB Championship in 2019.

In 2021, Morley rode for the Kent Kings in the SGB Championship 2021. The following season in 2022, he rode for the Birmingham Brummies in the SGB Championship 2022. However, he later signed for Plymouth Gladiators on an interim basis.

In 2023, Morley signed for Kent Royals for the 2023 National Development League speedway season and later signed for Plymouth again. In 2024, he rode for Kent Kings in the NORA league and won the NORA championship title.
