= Max Clegg =

British speedway rider (born 1997)

- Born: 11 April 1997 (age 29); Brighouse, England
- Nationality: British (English)

Career history
- 2012, 2023: Scunthorpe
- 2013–2016, 2019: Dudley/Cradley
- 2014, 2022: Leicester Lions
- 2015–2018: Edinburgh Monarchs
- 2016–2017: Wolverhampton Wolves
- 2017: Buxton Hitmen
- 2018: Rye House Rockets
- 2018: Stoke Potters
- 2019–2021: Newcastle Diamonds

Individual honours
- 2016: British Under-19 Champion
- 2016: National League Riders' Champion

Team honours
- 2013: National League
- 2013: National League Knockout Cup
- 2013: National Shield
- 2014: National League Fours

Max Clegg (born 11 April 1997) is a British former motorcycle speedway rider.

== Career ==
Born in Brighouse, Yorkshire, Clegg started racing in grasstrack at the age of seven, moving on to speedway in his teens and becoming team mascot for Sheffield Tigers. He finished second in the British Under-15 500cc Championship in 2011, and made his National League debut in 2012 for Scunthorpe Saints. In 2013, he moved to Dudley Heathens, and was part of the team that won the National League, National League Knock-out Cup, and National Shield titles. He later became the captain of the Cradley team. He was given a Premier League debut by Sheffield Tigers in the last meeting of their 2013 season.

In 2013, Clegg was included in the draft for Elite League reserve places, and was picked by Leicester Lions. He made his Elite League debut on 29 March 2014 against Wolverhampton Wolves, still aged 16. He was part of the Cradley team that won the National League Fours, held on 26 October 2014 at Brandon Stadium.

In December 2014, Clegg signed again for Cradley Heathens for 2015, this time as the team's number one rider and captain.

In 2016, Clegg won both the British Under-19 Championship and the National League Riders' Championship.

In 2022, Clegg re-joined and rode for the Leicester Lions in the SGB Championship 2022. In 2023, he signed for Scunthorpe but was later released.

Clegg retired from speedway before the 2024 season.
