= Isle of Wight Warriors =

Motorcycle speedway team from Ryde, England

Isle of Wight Warriors (formerly Islanders)

Club information
- Track address: Smallbrook Stadium; Ashey Road; Ryde; Isle of Wight PO33 4BH
- Country: England
- Founded: 1996, 2016 (re-founded)

Club facts
- Colours: Blue and Yellow
- Track size: 385 metres (421 yd)
- Track record time: 66.1 secs
- Track record date: 13 April 2017
- Track record holder: Stefan Nielsen

Major team honours
Premier League Knockout Cup	2003
Premier League Pairs	2002, 2007
Premier League Fours	2007
Young Shield	1998, 2001
National Trophy	2013

The Isle of Wight Warriors (formerly Isle of Wight Islanders) are a motorcycle speedway team from England. They last competed in the 2019 National Development League and ride their home meetings at the Smallbrook Stadium. Since leaving the British Speedway leagues, the team has competed in various challenge matches and the amateur NORA league.

== History ==
=== Origins and 1990s ===
Isle of Wight speedway began in 1996, at the Smallbrook Stadium, when the team signed up as a founder member of the newly formed Conference League. The league was for teams outside of the Premier League at the time and during their inaugural season the Ryde Wight Wizards finished in fourth place in the 1996 Speedway Conference League table.

The following season in 1997, the team entered the Conference League again, which was now the third tier of British speedway because a new Elite League had been formed as the top tier, with the Premier League becoming the second tier. However, in July the Premier League team Skegness Braves folded due to financial difficulties and the Smallbrook Stadium promotion stepped in to host the remainder of the fixtures. The team would be known as the Isle of Wight Islanders.

The team won their first silverware in 1998 after winning the Young Shield, an end of season event for the leading eight clubs in the league table. They defeated the league champions Peterborough Panthers in the final.

=== 2000s ===
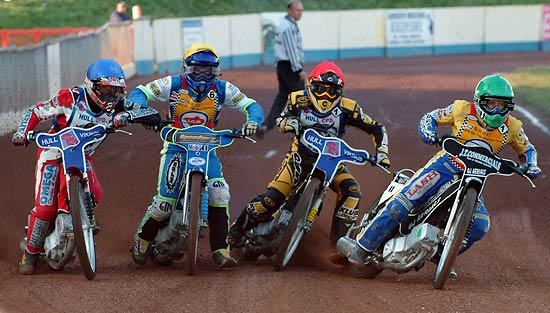
2005 match in Hull, Islanders vs Vikings

After several mediocre seasons they won the Young Shield again during the 2001 Premier League speedway season. In 2002, Adam Shields and Danny Bird won the Premier League Pairs Championship, held at Derwent Park on 19 July and the following season in 2003, the club won their best honour to date, when winning the Premier League Knockout Cup.

During the 2007 Premier League speedway season, the team reached the play offs and won both the Pairs (Chris Holder and Jason Bunyan beat Glasgow in the final) and Fours Championships (Holder, Bunyan, Krzysztof Stojanowski, Glen Phillips and Cory Gathercole).

After the 2008 season the Islanders joined the third division (the National League) finishing 5th.

=== 2010s ===
After three seasons without National league success, the team won the National Trophy (a supplementary tournament, during the 2013 National League speedway season).

After a break of two years (2014 and 2015), the club reformed in 2016 under the promotion of Barry Bishop and Martin Widman. For the 2018 and 2019 seasons the team raced as the Isle of Wight Warriors.

=== 2020s ===
The COVID-19 pandemic caused the cancellation of the 2020 season before the club announced they would not be competing during the 2021 season. However, a team would race as the Wightlink Warriors Shale Track Racing Club, separate from the British speedway leagues.

In 2024, the team won the amateur NORA league. On 30 May 2025 a fan forum is being held regarding the future of Warriors speedway.

== Notable riders ==
- (England) Danny Bird
- (England) Jason Bunyan
- (Australia) Jason Doyle
- (England) Adam Ellis
- (Australia) Cory Gathercole
- (Australia) Chris Holder
- (England) Ray Morton
- (England) Glen Phillips
- (Australia) Adam Shields
- (England) Nick Simmons
- (Poland) Krzysztof Stojanowski

== Season summary ==
Extended content

Year and league	Position	Notes
1996 Speedway Conference League	4th	Ryde Wight Wizards
1997 Premier League speedway season	8th	As the Islanders
1997 Speedway Conference League	3rd	Ryde Wight Wizards
1998 Premier League speedway season	6th	Young Shield winners
1999 Premier League speedway season	8th	
2000 Premier League speedway season	11th	
2001 Premier League speedway season	4th	Young Shield winners
2002 Premier League speedway season	3rd	Pairs Championship
2003 Premier League speedway season	3rd	Knockout Cup winners
2004 Premier League speedway season	5th	
2005 Premier League speedway season	6th	
2006 Premier League speedway season	8th	
2007 Premier League speedway season	5th	
2008 Premier League speedway season	11th	
2009 National League speedway season	5th	
2010 National League speedway season	7th	
2011 National League speedway season	9th	
2012 National League speedway season	3rd	
2013 National League speedway season	4th	
2016 National League speedway season	8th	
2017 National League speedway season	11th	
2018 National League speedway season	8th	first season as Warriors
2019 National Development League speedway season	6th	
