= Connor Coles =

British speedway rider (born 1994)

- Born: 7 September 1994 (age 32); Exeter, Devon, England
- Nationality: British (English)

Career history
- 2012: Rye House
- 2013: Kent
- 2014-2016: Mildenhall
- 2017: Newcastle
- 2017: Eastbourne
- 2017: Isle of Wight
- 2018: Buxton
- 2019, 2024: Edinburgh
- 2019: Stoke
- 2021: Belle Vue
- 2022: Plymouth
- 2022: Leicester
- 2023: Berwick

Team honours
- 2019: NDL Fours
- 2022: tier 3 league champion
- 2022: tier 3 KO Cup winner

Connor Coles (born 7 September 1994) is a British motorcycle speedway.

== Speedway career ==
Coles began his speedway career riding for Rye House Raiders during the 2012 National League speedway season and then moved to Kent Kings for the 2013 National League speedway season. He then spent three seasons with the Mildenhall Fen Tigers, in which time he helped the team win the National Trophy. It was in 2017 that Coles moved up to the SGB Championship and rode for Newcastle Diamonds for the SGB Championship 2017 season. He also appeared for Eastbourne and the Isle of Wight in the third division.

Following a season with Buxton, Coles joined Edinburgh in the SGB Championship 2019 and Stoke Potters in the NDL. He was part of the Stoke team that won the NDL Fours, held on 13 July 2019 at Loomer Road Stadium and was due to ride for the Isle of Wight in 2020.

In 2021, Coles rode for the Belle Vue Colts.

In 2022, Coles rode for the Scunthorpe Scorpions and Plymouth Gladiators in the SGB Championship 2022 and Leicester Lion Cubs during the 2022 National Development League speedway season. As part of the Leicester team he helped them dominate the season by winning the league and KO Cup double.

In 2023, Coles signed for Berwick Bandits for the SGB Premiership 2023 and their junior side the Bullets. He was voted Rider of the Year for both the Bandits and the Bullets. He re-signed for Edinburgh for the 2024 season, riding for both the senior and junior team.

== Personal life ==
Coles is a third generation rider, with his father Michael Coles and grandfather Bob Coles both being former professional riders and riding for the England national speedway team.
