= National Development League =

British motorcycle speedway league

- Current season, competition or edition: 2026 National Development League speedway season
- Formerly: Conference League
- Sport: Speedway
- Founded: 2009
- No. of teams: 6
- Country: United Kingdom
- Most recent champion: Oxford Chargers
- Most titles: 3 titles: Leicester Lion Cubs
- Website: SpeedwayGB

Notes
- Leagues above SGB Premiership (div 1); SGB Championship (div 2)

The National Development League formerly called the National League was formed in 2009 as the third division of speedway in the United Kingdom, replacing the Conference League. It follows the same rules and regulations as the SGB Premiership and SGB Championship, including the use of rider averages. It is however regarded as the league for junior riders or in some cases other riders returning to the sport.

== History ==
There were two previous speedway leagues in Britain sharing the 'National League' name, the main league that operated from 1932 to 1964, and British League Division Two, which was renamed the National League between 1975 and 1990.

The rebranded league started in 2009 and consisted of eleven teams. Over the following years the teams have changed significantly with only four of the original eleven teams still operating in 2023. In recent years, the majority of the clubs that compete are junior sides of teams from the top two divisions.

== Rules ==
The rules follow those of the SGB Premiership and SGB Championship with some relaxation of regulations. Riders who hold a non-British FMN licence are not permitted to compete in the National League.

== Champions ==
Season	Champions	Second	Ref
2009	Bournemouth Buccaneers	Plymouth Devils	
2010	Buxton Hitmen	Newport Hornets	
2011	Scunthorpe/Sheffield	Mildenhall Fen Tigers	
2012	Mildenhall Fen Tigers	Dudley Heathens	
2013	Dudley Heathens	King's Lynn Young Stars	
2014	Cradley Heathens	Coventry Storm	
2015	Birmingham Brummies	Eastbourne Eagles	
2016	Birmingham Brummies	Eastbourne Eagles	
2017	Belle Vue Colts	Eastbourne Eagles	
2018	Eastbourne Eagles	Mildenhall Fen Tigers	
2019	Leicester Lion Cubs	Kent Kings	
2020	Cancelled due to the COVID-19 pandemic		
2021	Mildenhall Fen Tigers	Berwick Bullets	
2022	Leicester Lion Cubs	Mildenhall Fen Tigers	
2023	Oxford Chargers	Leicester Lion Cubs	
2024	Leicester Lion Cubs	Belle Vue Colts	
2025	Oxford Chargers	Edinburgh Monarchs Academy	
2026	Edinburgh Monarchs Academy		

== See also ==
List of United Kingdom Speedway League Champions
