= 1975 British League season =

British speedway season

- League: British League
- No. of competitors: 18
- Champions: Ipswich Witches
- Knockout Cup: Belle Vue Aces
- Individual: Peter Collins
- Spring Gold Cup: Newport Wasps
- Midland Cup: Oxford Rebels
- Northern Trophy: Belle Vue Aces
- London Cup: Wimbledon Dons
- Highest average: Ivan Mauger
- Division/s below: 1975 National League

The 1975 Gulf Oil British League season was the 41st season of the top tier of motorcycle speedway in the United Kingdom and the 11th season known as the British League.

== Summary ==
The league was sponsored for the first time by Gulf Oil. Reading Racers returned after a one-season absence to increase the size of the league back to eighteen teams and the ban on overseas riders that rode in other leagues abroad was lifted.

The Ipswich Witches won their first title, defeating Belle Vue Aces by a solitary point. John Louis and Billy Sanders scored heavily throughout the season for Ipswich. Belle Vue found consolation by winning the Knockout Cup.

In their last season at the Cowley track, Oxford Rebels won the Midland Cup, beating Wolverhampton Wolves but the competition was overshadowed by the death of rider Gary Peterson.

== Final table ==
Pos	Team	PL	W	D	L	Pts
1	Ipswich Witches	34	26	1	7	53
2	Belle Vue Aces	34	25	2	7	52
3	Newport	34	24	1	9	49
4	Exeter Falcons	34	20	3	11	45
5	Sheffield Tigers	34	21	0	13	42
6	Reading Racers	34	21	0	13	42
7	Oxford Rebels	34	18	0	16	36
8	Leicester Lions	34	16	4	14	36
9	Wimbledon Dons	34	16	2	16	34
10	Halifax Dukes	34	15	3	16	33
11	Cradley United	34	15	2	17	32
12	King's Lynn Stars	34	14	3	17	31
13	Wolverhampton Wolves	34	13	1	20	27
14	Hull Vikings	34	10	4	20	24
15	Poole Pirates	34	10	3	21	23
16	Coventry Bees	34	9	2	23	20
17	Hackney Hawks	34	9	1	24	19
18	Swindon Robins	34	8	0	26	16

M = Matches; W = Wins; D = Draws; L = Losses; Pts = Total Points

== Fixtures and results ==
Home \ Away	BV	COV	CH	EX	HAC	HAL	HV	IPS	KL	LEI	NEW	OX	PP	RR	SHE	SWI	WIM	WOL
Belle Vue		49–29	42–36	55–23	49–29	42–36	46–32	50–28	46–32	47–31	49–29	42–36	45–33	50–28	51–27	48–30	53–25	55–23
Coventry	30–48		44–34	42–36	44.5–33.5	35–43	39–39	41–37	39–39	38–40	33–45	52–26	41–7	38–40	37–41	44–34	41–37	35–42
Cradley Heath	39–39	58–20		39–39	42–36	47–31	51–27	38–40	45–33	42–35	45–32	40–38	44–34	35–43	43–35	43–35	35–43	50–28
Exeter	41–37	58–20	30–48		55–23	41–37	51–27	45–33	46–32	45–33	36–42	43–35+	46–32	43–35	42–36	47–31	43–35	50–28
Hackney	35–43	43–35	58–20	39–39		52–26	41–37	31–47	38–40	30–48	43–35	37–41	36–42	35–43	42–36	49–29	34–44	42–36
Halifax	34–44	40–38	45–33	43–35	43–35		39–39	35–43	42–36	39–39	47–31	44–34	49–29	44–34	33–44	42–36	47–31	41–37
Hull	39–39	42–36	47–31	36–42	42–36	39–39		37–41	36–41	43–35	35–43	40–38	49–29	36–42	38–40	43–35	42–36	47–31
Ipswich	42–36	53–25	45–33	42–36	46–32	59–19	50–28		50–28	42–36	42–36	40–38	43–34	50–27	55–23	47–31	50–28	46–32
King's Lynn	36–42	52–25	36–42	35–43	52–26	41–37	37–41	33–45		39–39	40–38	41–37	39–39	48–30	41–37	41–37	51–27	54–24
Leicester	40–38	45–33	49–29	37–41	43–35	34–44	43–35	39–39	47–31		43–35	43–35	43–35	45–33	43–35	46–32	48–30	45–33
Newport	55–23	58–20	49–29	40–38	58–20	53–25	46–32	56–22	52–26	52–26		52–26	56–22	51–27	61–17	47–31	47–30	50–28
Oxford	34–44	58–20	58–14	35–43	44–34	49–29	49–29	40–38	49–29	40–38	36–42		44–34	46–32	44–34	44–34	44–34	43–35
Poole	37–41	42–36	48–30	42–36	46–32	46–32	42–36	36–42	43–35	39–39	39–39	45–33		37–41	31–47	45–33	36–42	37–41
Reading	41–37	48–30	40–38	43–34	53–25	42–36	48–30	36–42	46–32	41–37	42–36	41–37	50–28		41–37	50–28	40–38	52–26
Sheffield	38–40	47–31	46–32	41–37	51–27	40–38	48–30	42–36	50–28	45–33	34–44	41–36	51–27	42–36		51–27	44–33	49–29
Swindon	40–38	37–41	33–45	36–41	46–31	32–46	42–36	36–42	36–42	42–36	29–49	37–41	44–34	48–30	33–45		41–37	40–38
Wimbledon	36–42	45–33	53–25	39–39	40–38	52–26	45–33	44–34	35–43	43–35	40–38	42–35	50–28	42–36	37–41	42–35		43–35
Wolverhampton	40–38	47–31	45–33	32–46	34–44	40–38	42–36	31–47	46–32	43–35	37–41	31–47	46–32	47–31	45–33	46–32	39–39	

Legend: Blue = home team win; Yellow = draw; Red = away team win.

+ Match awarded to Oxford

== Top ten riders (league averages) ==
	Rider	Nat	Team	C.M.A.
1	Ivan Mauger	(New Zealand)	Exeter	11.45
2	Peter Collins	(England)	Belle Vue	11.27
3	Phil Crump	(Australia)	Newport	11.17
4	Anders Michanek	(Sweden)	Reading	11.03
5	Ole Olsen	(Denmark)	Wolverhampton	10.79
6	John Louis	(England)	Ipswich	10.67
7	Dave Jessup	(England)	Leicester	10.45
8	Malcolm Simmons	(England)	Poole	10.37
9	Dag Lövaas	(Norway)	Oxford	10.22
10	Reg Wilson	(England)	Sheffield	10.18

== British League Knockout Cup ==
The 1975 Speedway Star British League Knockout Cup was the 37th edition of the Knockout Cup for tier one teams. Belle Vue Aces were the winners.

First round

Date	Team one	Score	Team two
22/05	Sheffield	44–34	Exeter
19/04	Belle Vue	49–29	Wolverhampton
18/04	Wolverhampton	37–41	Belle Vue
14/04	Exeter	47–31	Sheffield

Second round

Date	Team one	Score	Team two
01/07	Leicester	47–31	Hackney
27/06	Hackney	40–38	Leicester
23/06	Cradley Heath	46–32	Kings Lynn
21/06	Kings Lynn	42–36	Cradley Heath
19/06	Oxford	60–18	Coventry
19/06	Ipswich	42–36	Belle Vue
16/06	Exeter	43–35	Poole
16/06	Reading	38–40	Newport
14/06	Swindon	47–31	Hull
14/06	Coventry	33–45	Oxford
11/06	Poole	41–37	Exeter
11/06	Hull	46–32	Swindon
07/06	Halifax	58–20	Wimbledon
06/06	Newport	46–32	Reading
05/06	Wimbledon	49–29	Halifax
04/06	Belle Vue	49–28	Ipswich

Quarter-finals

Date	Team one	Score	Team two
09/08	Cradley Heath	51–27	Newport
09/08	Belle Vue	45–33	Oxford
08/08	Newport	49–29	Cradley Heath
07/08	Oxford	36–42	Belle Vue
02/08	Swindon	32–46	Leicester
29/07	Leicester	42–36	Swindon
17/07	Exeter	43–35	Halifax
05/07	Halifax	47–31	Exeter

Semi-finals

Date	Team one	Score	Team two
05/10	Belle Vue	44–34	Cradley Heath
27/09	Halifax	37–40	Leicester
26/09	Leicester	47–31	Halifax
22/09	Cradley Heath	32–45	Belle Vue

=== Final ===
First leg

7 October 1975

Leicester Lions Dave Jessup 11 Ila Teromaa 10 Ray Wilson 9 Frank Auffret 6 Doug Underwood 2 Tony Lomas 0 Keith White 0	38–40	Belle Vue Aces Peter Collins 12 Chris Morton 9 Sören Sjösten 7 Geoff Pusey 4 Alan Wilkinson 4 Russ Hodgson 3 Paul Tyrer 1

Leicester Stadium

Second leg

22 October 1975

Belle Vue Aces Peter Collins 12 Sören Sjösten 8 Paul Tyrer 8 Alan Wilkinson 8 Chris Morton 7 Russ Hodgson 2 Geoff Pusey 1	46–32	Leicester Lions Dave Jessup 8 Ray Wilson 7 Frank Auffret 6 Doug Underwood 6 Tony Lomas 3 Ila Teromaa 1 Keith White 1

Belle Vue Stadium

Belle Vue Aces were declared Knockout Cup Champions, winning on aggregate 86-70.

== Riders' Championship ==
Peter Collins won the British League Riders' Championship for the second time, it was held at Hyde Road on 18 October.

Pos.	Rider	Heat Scores	Total
1	(England) Peter Collins	3 3 3 3 3	15
2	(Australia) Phil Crump	2 3 3 1 3	12
3	(England) Martin Ashby	3 1 2 3 2	11
4	(England) John Louis	3 2 0 3 3	11
5	(England) Doug Wyer	3 2 1 2 2	10
6	(England) Malcolm Simmons	2 3 1 2 1	9
7	(England) Chris Pusey	1 0 3 3 2	9
8	(England) Dave Jessup	2 0 2 2 2	8
9	(Sweden) Anders Michanek	2 1 2 R 3	8
10	(New Zealand) Ivan Mauger	1 0 3 1 1	6
11	(Sweden) Tommy Jansson	0 3 1 1 1	6
12	(England) Terry Betts	1 1 2 0 1	5
13	(Scotland) Jim McMillan	2 0 2 0 0	4
14	(Australia) Bob Valentine	0 1 1 1 EF	3
15	(Norway) Dag Lövaas	1 2 0 0 0	3
16	(Australia) John Boulger	0 0 0 0 0	0

- ef=engine failure, f=fell, x=excluded

== Leading final averages ==
	Rider	Nat	Team	C.M.A.
1	Ivan Mauger	(New Zealand)	Exeter	11.52
2	Phil Crump	(Australia)	Newport	11.15
3	Peter Collins	(England)	Belle Vue	11.13
4	Anders Michanek	(Sweden)	Reading	10.90
5	Ole Olsen	(Denmark)	Wolverhampton	10.79
6	John Louis	(England)	Ipswich	10.58
7	Dave Jessup	(England)	Leicester	10.41
8	Malcolm Simmons	(England)	Poole	10.41
9	Martin Ashby	(England)	Swindon	10.13
10	Tommy Jansson	(Sweden)	Wimbledon	10.12
11	Dag Lövaas	(Norway)	Oxford	10.04
12	Ray Wilson	(England)	Wolverhampton	9.90
13	Reg Wilson	(England)	Sheffield	9.79
14	Jim McMillan	(Scotland)	Hull	9.69
15	Billy Sanders	(Australia)	Ipswich	9.58
16	Doug Wyer	(England)	Sheffield	9.37
17	Chris Morton	(England)	Belle Vue	9.27
18	Barry Briggs	(New Zealand)	Wimbledon	9.23
19	Scott Autrey	(United States)	Exeter	9.19
20	Reidar Eide	(Norway)	Newport	8.98

== Spring Gold Cup ==
East Group

Team	PL	W	D	L	Pts
Reading	6	3	1	2	7
Ipswich	6	3	1	2	7
Hackney	6	3	0	3	6
King's Lynn	6	2	0	4	4

West Group

Team	PL	W	D	L	Pts
Newport	6	5	0	1	10
Poole	6	4	0	2	8
Exeter	6	2	0	4	4
Wimbledon	6	1	0	5	2

East Group

Home \ Away	HAC	IPS	KL	REA
Hackney		38–40	45–33	41–37
Ipswich	42–36		45–33	39–39
King's Lynn	37–41	44–34		44–34
Reading	51–27	41–37	44–34	

Legend: Blue = home team win; Yellow = draw; Red = away team win.

West Group

Home \ Away	EX	NEW	PP	WIM
Exeter		34–42	44–34	50–28
Newport	46–32		58–20	54–24
Poole	42–36	40–38		45–33
Wimbledon	40–38	34–44	34–44	

Legend: Blue = home team win; Yellow = draw; Red = away team win.

Final

Team one	Team two	Score
Newport	Reading	53–25, 33–54

== Midland Cup ==
Oxford won the Midland Cup. The competition consisted of six teams.

First round

Team one	Team two	Score
Oxford	Swindon	39–39, 39–39
Oxford	Swindon	53–25, 33–44
Coventry	Cradley	40–37, 35–43

Semi final round

Team one	Team two	Score
Wolverhampton	Cradley	42–35, 44–34
Oxford	Leicester	46–32, 35–43

Final

First leg

5 October 1975

Oxford Dag Lovaas 10 Gordon Kennett 9 John Dews 6 Richard Greer 6 Trevor Geer 5 Paul Gachet 2 Richard Hellsen 2	40–38	Wolverhampton Martin Ashby (guest) 13 Finn Thomsen 10 George Hunter 10 Malcolm Shakespeare 4 Colin Meredith 1 Gary Peterson 0 Leif Berlin r/r

Oxford Stadium

Second leg

17 October 1975

Wolverhampton Ole Olsen 11 Malcolm Shakespeare 7 Finn Thomsen 6 Leif Berlin 6 Gary Peterson 4 Keith Anderson 3 Colin Meredith 1	38–39	Oxford Alan Grahame 12 Dag Lovaas 9 Gordon Kennett 7 Richard Greer 7 John Dews 3 Richard Hellsen 1 Brian Clark 0

Monmore Green Stadium

Oxford won on aggregate 79–76

== Northern Trophy ==
		M	W	D	L	Pts
1	Belle Vue	6	5	0	1	10
2	Sheffield	6	4	0	2	8
3	Halifax	6	3	0	3	6
4	Hull	6	0	0	6	0

Home \ Away	BV	HAL	HUL	SHE
Belle Vue		52–26	45–33	40–38
Halifax	35–43		48–30	44–34
Hull	37–41	37–40		36–42
Sheffield	42–36	46–32	49–29	

Legend: Blue = home team win; Yellow = draw; Red = away team win.

== London Cup ==
Wimbledon retained the London Cup but there were now only two teams remaining in London.

Results

Team	Score	Team
Wimbledon	48–30	Hackney
Hackney	46–32	Wimbledon

== Riders & final averages ==
Belle Vue

- (England) Peter Collins 11.13
- (England) Chris Morton 9.27
- (Sweden) Sören Sjösten 8.76
- (England) Alan Wilkinson 7.14
- (England) Paul Tyrer 6.21
- (England) Russ Hodgson 5.03
- (England) Ian Hindle 4.00
- (England) Geoff Pusey 3.55

Coventry

- (Australia) Bob Valentine 8.66
- (England) Nigel Boocock 8.02
- (Sweden) Tommy Nilsson 5.37
- (England) John Harrhy 5.14
- (England) Ian Hindle 4.82
- (England) Alan Molyneux 4.43
- (England) Alan Jay 4.36
- (England) Frank Smith 3.84
- (New Zealand) Mitch Shirra 2.23
- (England) Roger Hill 1.71

Cradley Heath

- (Australia) John Boulger 8.73
- (Sweden) Bernt Persson 8.58
- (England) Arthur Price 7.68
- (New Zealand) Bruce Cribb 7.53
- (Hungary) Sándor Lévai 4.87
- (England) Steve Bastable 4.84
- (England) Dave Perks 4.56
- (England) Russell Osborne 3.08

Exeter

- (New Zealand) Ivan Mauger 11.52
- (United States) Scott Autrey 9.19
- (England) Kevin Holden 7.50
- (Australia) Steve Reinke 6.07
- (Australia) John Titman 5.89
- (England) Les Rumsey 5.71
- (Australia) Geoff Mudge 4.96
- (Australia) Mike Farrell 4.72
- (England) Chris Julian 3.44

Hackney

- (England) Dave Morton 8.54
- (England) Barry Thomas 7.81
- (Sweden) Christer Löfqvist 7.61
- (England) Laurie Etheridge 5.84
- (England) Dave Kennett 4.68
- (England) Steve Lomas 4.60
- (England) Mike Broadbank 4.46
- (England) Ted Hubbard 3.86

Halifax

- (England) Chris Pusey 8.77
- (England) Rick France 8.03
- (England) Graham Plant 7.58
- (Australia) Charlie Monk 7.11
- (England) Ian Cartwright 5.92
- (Netherlands) Henny Kroeze 5.74
- (England) Dave Gatenby 4.89
- (England) Mike Hiftle 4.32
- (England) Andy Cusworth 3.83

Hull

- (Scotland) Jimmy McMillan 9.69
- (England) Joe Owen 7.29
- (Scotland) Bobby Beaton 7.20
- (Sweden) Tommy Johansson 6.64
- (England) Mitch Graham 6.53
- (Australia) Lou Sansom 5.22
- (England) Brian Havelock 5.14
- (Australia) Kym Amundson 5.10
- (England) Alan Cowland 3.49
- (Australia) Robin Amundson 3.45

Ipswich

- (England) John Louis 10.58
- (Australia) Billy Sanders 9.58
- (England) Tony Davey 7.75
- (England) Mike Lanham 6.44
- (England) Mick Hines 5.13
- (England) Trevor Jones 4.99
- (England) Ted Howgego 4.78
- (England) Dave Gooderham 4.00

King's Lynn

- (England) Terry Betts 8.87
- (England) Ian Turner 7.48
- (England) Michael Lee 7.43
- (England) Trevor Hedge 6.20
- (England) Ray Bales 5.77
- (Australia) Garry Middleton 5.76
- (Sweden) Olle Nygren 4.75
- (England) David Gagen 4.56
- (Denmark) Jan Henningsen 4.07
- (England) Billy Burton 4.00
- (England) Eddie Reeves 4.00

Leicester

- (England) Dave Jessup 10.41
- (England) Ray Wilson 9.90
- (Finland) Ila Teromaa 5.91
- (England) Frank Auffret 5.84
- (England) Tony Lomas 5.70
- (England) Keith White 4.93
- (Australia) Doug Underwood 4.17
- (England) Norman Storer 3.75

Newport

- (Australia) Phil Crump 11.15
- (Norway) Reidar Eide 8.98
- (Australia) Phil Herne 8.70
- (Australia) Neil Street 7.32
- (England) Bob Coles 7.13
- (United States) Steve Gresham 6.34
- (England) Tom Owen 6.11
- (England) Jim Tebby 3.26

Oxford

- (Norway) Dag Lövaas 10.04
- (England) Gordon Kennett 8.41
- (England) Richard Greer 7.48
- (England) John Dews 6.57
- (England) Trevor Geer 5.73
- (Sweden) Richard Hellsen 4.75
- (England) Paul Gachet 4.15
- (Norway) Helge Langli 2.46

Poole

- (England) Malcolm Simmons 10.41
- (England) Eric Broadbelt 7.50
- (Sweden) Christer Sjösten 6.23
- (England) Colin Gooddy 5.39
- (England) Pete Smith 5.29
- (England) Neil Middleditch 4.48
- (Australia) Neil Cameron 3.77
- (England) Martin Yeates 2.53

Reading

- (Sweden) Anders Michanek 10.90
- (England) John Davis 7.37
- (Sweden) Bengt Jansson 7.06
- (England) Bernie Leigh 5.59
- (Australia) Bob Humphreys 5.56
- (England) Mick Bell 5.21
- (England) Richard May 4.99

Sheffield

- (England) Reg Wilson 9.79
- (England) Doug Wyer 9.37
- (England) Arnold Haley 7.91
- (England) Carl Glover 6.41
- (Sweden) Soren Karlsson 6.09
- (England) Craig Pendlebury 5.88
- (England) Nicky Allott 3.17

Swindon

- (England) Martin Ashby 10.13
- (England) Bob Kilby 8.26
- (England) Norman Hunter 5.43
- (England) Alan Grahame 4.95
- (Sweden) Jan Andersson 4.56
- (England) Geoff Bouchard 4.42
- (England) Bobby McNeil 4.27
- (England) Mike Keen 3.18
- (England) David Ashby 2.79

Wimbledon

- (Sweden) Tommy Jansson 10.12
- (New Zealand) Barry Briggs 9.23
- (Norway) Edgar Stangeland 7.24
- (Scotland) Bert Harkins 6.11
- (England) Barry Crowson 4.97
- (New Zealand) Larry Ross 4.85
- (England) Reg Luckhurst 4.76
- (England) Roger Johns 4.40
- (England) Graham Banks 2.19

Wolverhampton

- (Denmark) Ole Olsen 10.79
- (Scotland) George Hunter 6.99
- (Denmark) Finn Thomsen 6.29
- (New Zealand) Gary Peterson 5.85
- (England) Malcolm Shakespeare 4.55
- (England) Colin Meredith 3.19
- (England) Tony Clarke 3.16
- (England) Nigel Wasley 2.96

== See also ==
- List of United Kingdom Speedway League Champions
- Knockout Cup (speedway)
