= 1970 British League Division Two season =

British speedway season

- League: British League Division Two
- No. of competitors: 17
- Champions: Canterbury Crusaders
- Knockout Cup: Ipswich Witches
- Individual: Dave Jessup
- Highest average: Gary Peterson
- Division/s above: British League (Div 1)

The 1970 British League Division Two season was the third season of second tier motorcycle speedway in Great Britain.

== Team changes ==
The league expanded from 16 to 17 teams in its third season. Plymouth Devils dropped out and were replaced by Peterborough Panthers. Peterborough promoted by Allied Presentations (headed by Maurice Littlechild) were to race at the East of England Showground.

Workington Comets under the promotion of Ian Thomas and Jeff Brownhut also joined the league and raced at Derwent Park.

Before the season got underway the 1968 and 1969 champions Belle Vue Colts disbanded with most of their riders and the promotion team moving to Rochdale and becoming the Rochdale Hornets. Doncaster changed their nickname from Stallions to Dragons.

== Summary ==
Two teams changed venue during the season. The first was in July when the Nelson Admirals moved to Bradford to become Bradford Northern. The second saw promoters Cyril Crane and Gordon Perkins receive planning permission to construct a track at the Boston Sports Stadium and the promoters bought the second-tier team known as the King's Lynn Starlets from Maurice Littlechild and became the Boston Barracudas.

Canterbury Crusaders won their first title. New Zealander Graeme Smith averaged 10.49 for the Crusaders and was well backed up by Barry Crowson (9.17) and Barry Thomas (9.11). Another New Zealander Gary Peterson topped the averages riding initially for the Nelson Admirals and then Bradford Northern.

== Final table ==
Pos	Team	PL	Home					Away					Pts
Pos	Team	PL	W	D	L	F	A	W	D	L	F	A	Pts
1	Canterbury Crusaders	32	16	0	0	774	472	7	1	8	610	636	47
2	Eastbourne Eagles	32	16	0	0	788	458	6	1	9	576.5	667.5	45
3	Rochdale Hornets	32	16	0	0	842	395	5	2	9	618	625	44
4	Bradford Northern	32	16	0	0	826	418	2	1	13	529	716	37
5	Middlesbrough Teessiders	32	15	0	1	752	492	3	0	13	552	694	36
6	Ipswich Witches	32	13	2	1	717	529	4	0	12	537	707	36
7	Crewe Kings	32	16	0	0	800	445	1	1	14	505	741	35
8	Romford Bombers	32	12	0	4	702.5	541.5	5	1	10	551	690	35
9	Reading Racers	32	14	0	2	723	521	3	0	13	555.5	690.5	34
10	Peterborough Panthers	32	13	1	2	681	567	1	1	14	510	734	30
11	Workington Comets	32	12	0	4	690	555	1	1	14	555	681	27
12	Rayleigh Rockets	32	12	1	3	666	577	1	0	15	489.5	752.5	27
13	Boston Barracudas	32	10	1	5	658.5	585.5	2	1	13	485.5	756.5	26
14	Crayford Highwaymen	32	11	1	4	682	561	0	0	16	471	777	23
15	Doncaster Dragons	32	8	1	7	621.5	616.5	3	0	13	502	745	23
16	Berwick Bandits	32	10	0	6	661	584	0	0	16	428	816	20
17	Long Eaton Rangers	32	8	3	5	613.5	631.5	0	0	16	474	769	19

== Fixtures and results ==
Home \ Away	BER	BOS	BRA	CAN	CRA	CK	DON	EAS	IPS	LE	MID	PET	RAY	REA	RH	ROM	WOR
Berwick		46–32	45–33	38–40	52–26	43–35	36–42	42–34	41–37	47–31	42–36	47–31	49–29	38–40	26–51	34–44	35–43
Boston/King's Lynn	43–34		49–29	40–37	51–27	47–31	35–43	38–40	40–38	47–30	37–41	37–41	43–35	44.5–32.5	26–52	42–36	39–39
Bradford/ Nelson	52–26	59–19		50–28	55–23	55–23	58–19	44–34	52–25	55–22	59–19	56–22	46–32	49–29	46–31	50–28	40–38
Canterbury	57–21	51–26	53–25		46–32	50–28	49–29	42–36	51–27	55–22	42–36	44–34	48–30	47–31	45–33	43–35	51–27
Crayford	51–26	43–35	52–25	28–50		47–31	45–33	37–41	42–36	44–34	38–40	40–38	54–24	46–32	39–39	33–42	43–35
Crewe	56–22	53–25	43–35	47–31	54–24		49–29	53–25	52–26	52–26	46–32	58–20	49–27	47–31	47–31	53–24	41–37
Doncaster	48–30	36–40	30–47	35–43	40–38	42–35		44–34	38–40	40–37	40–38	39–39	36.5–39.5	43–35	36–42	36–42	38–37
Eastbourne	55–23	44–34	52–26	45–33	51–27	58–20	50–28		53–25	56–22	47–31	44–33	56–22	41–37	42–35	50–28	44–34
Ipswich	57–21	44–34	39–39	34–44	50–28	48–30	47–31	51–27		43–35	40–38	47–30	42–36	44–34	39–39	41–36	51–27
Long Eaton	40–38	39–39	40–38	31–47	47–31	43–35	36–42	38.5–38.5	29–49		33–45	41–37	40–38	34–44	44–33	39–39	39–38
Middlesbrough	53–25	53–25	49–29	42–36	46–32	38–39	44–34	45–32	42–36	53–25		49–29	46–32	42–36	43–35	62–15	45–32
Peterborough	46–32	40–38	47–31	39–39	45–33	42–36	50–28	33–45	43–35	42–36	41–37		51–27	42–36	30–48	48–30	42–36
Rayleigh	45–32	49–29	40–38	37–40	47–31	39–39	41–37	31–47	51–27	40–38	40–37	42–35		45–33	43–35	34–43	42–36
Reading	59–19	55–23	44–34	37–41	42–36	49–29	47–31	45–33	36–41	45–33	44–34	43–34	50–27		43–35	40–38	44–33
Rochdale	58–20	61–15	51–27	51–27	63–15	41–37	52–26	53–25	54–23	57–21	49–29	45–33	57–20	53–24		50–28	47–25
Romford	44–33	46.5–31.5	36–41	41–37	46–32	48–30	51–27	38–40	36–41	49–29	50–28	54–24	41–37	35–43	47–30		40–38
Workington	52–26	37–40	46–32	41–37	42–36	51–27	55–23	33–45	47–31	44–33	46–31	48–30	44–34	40–38	29–49	35–43	

Legend: Blue = home team win; Yellow = draw; Red = away team win.

== Top five riders (league averages) ==
	Rider	Nat	Team	C.M.A.
1	Gary Peterson	(New Zealand)	Bradford Northern	10.79
2	Graeme Smith	(New Zealand)	Canterbury	10.41
3	Eric Broadbelt	(England)	Rochdale	10.08
4	Paul O'Neil	(New Zealand)	Crewe	9.91
5	Archie Wilkinson	(England)	Crayford	9.85

== Knockout Cup ==
The 1970 British League Division Two Knockout Cup was the third edition of the Knockout Cup for tier two teams. Ipswich Witches were the winners of the competition defeating Berwick Bandits in the final. The Bandits were surprise finalists given their final league placing which was second from bottom of the table.

First round

Date	Team one	Score	Team two
11/04	Rayleigh	48-30	Peterborough
19/04	Rochdale	43-35	Long Eaton
20/04	Crewe	49-29	Nelson
26/04	Eastbourne	34-44	Canterbury
30/04	Ipswich	51-27+	Crayford
02/05	Berwick	53-25	Doncaster
07/05	Teesside	54-24	King's Lynn
07/05	Romford	48-30	Reading

+ first match abandoned with score at 25–17

Quarter-finals

Date	Team one	Score	Team two
17/05	Rochdale	48-30	Romford
21/05	Ipswich	46-31	Rayleigh
23/05	Berwick	40-36	Teesside
06/06	Canterbury	52-26	Crewe

Semi-finals

Date	Team one	Score	Team two
07/07	Berwick	44-34	Canterbury
27/08	Ipswich	42-36	Rochdale

=== Final ===
First leg

24 September 1970

Ipswich Witches John Louis 12 John Harrhy 11 Pete Bailey 9 Ron Bagley 6 Stan Pepper 5 Ted Spittles 4 Tony Davey 0	47 – 31	Berwick Bandits Doug Wyer 11 Maury Robinson 6 Peter Kelly 6 Lex Milloy 4 Alistair Brady 2 Ken Ormand 1 Roy Williams 1

Foxhall Stadium

Second leg

26 September 1970

Berwick Bandits Doug Wyer 10 Maury Robinson 9 Alistair Brady 7 Peter Kelly 5 Lex Milloy 5 Roy Williams 5 Ken Ormand 2	43 – 35	Ipswich Witches John Louis 15 Pete Bailey 12 Stan Pepper 4 Ron Bagley 2 Ted Spittles 2 Tony Davey 0 John Harrhy R/R

Shielfield Park

Ipswich were declared Knockout Cup Champions, winning on aggregate 82–74.

== Riders' Championship ==
Dave Jessup won the Rider's Championship, held at Hackney Wick Stadium on 25 September. Jessup was aged just 17 at the time.

Pos.	Rider	Pts	Total
1	(England) Dave Jessup	3 3 3 3 2	14
2	(England) Barry Crowson	2 3 3 2 2	12+3
3	(New Zealand) Gary Peterson	2 3 1 3 3	12+2
4	(England) Eric Broadbelt	3 1 2 2 3	11
5	(England) Tom Leadbitter	3 2 3 1 1	10
6	(England) John Harrhy	f 3 2 3 1	9
7	(Australia) Bob Valentine	2 2 3 2 0	9
8	(New Zealand) Paul O'Neil	1 1 3 3	8
9	(England) Richard May	1 2 2 ef 2	7
10	(Scotland) Ross Gilbertson	3 ef 2 2 0	7
11	(Scotland) Andy Ross	1 0 1 1 2	5
12	(England) Arthur Price	2 2 0 1 0	5
13	(England) Geoff Maloney	0 1 1 1 1	4
14	(England) Maury Robinson	ex 0 0 0	3
15	(England) Tony Childs	1 1 ef 0	3
16	(Scotland) Gordon McGregor	1 0 0 r	1
17	(England) Ken Vale (res)	0	0

- f=fell, r-retired, ex=excluded, ef=engine failure

== Final leading averages ==
	Rider	Nat	Team	C.M.A.
1	Gary Peterson	(New Zealand)	Bradford Northern/Nelson	10.76
2	Graeme Smith	(New Zealand)	Canterbury	10.49
3	Eric Broadbelt	(England)	Rochdale	10.07
5	Taffy Owen	(Wales)	Workington	9.94
5	Paul O'Neil	(New Zealand)	Crewe	9.69

== Riders' final averages ==
Berwick

- Doug Wyer 8.39
- Maury Robinson 8.13
- Peter Kelly 7.28
- Bernie Lagrosse/Roy Williams 6.00
- Ken Omand 5.41
- Alan Paynter 5.26
- Peter Baldock 5.14
- Ian Paterson 5.03
- Alistair Brady 4.89
- Andy Meldrum 4.80
- Jimmy Gallacher 3.53

Boston/King's Lynn (Boston took over fixtures mid-season)

- Arthur Price 7.52
- Graham Edmonds 7.27
- Russ Osborne 5.70
- Jack Bywater 4.97
- Tony Featherstone 4.26
- John Ingamells 3.73
- Brian Osborn 3.62

Bradford (Bradford took over Nelson's fixtures mid-season)

- Gary Peterson 10.76
- Alf Wells 9.32
- Alan Knapkin 9.28
- Dave Schofield 6.15
- Sid Sheldrick 5.93
- Alan Bridgett 5.85
- Peter Thompson 5.22
- Robin Adlington 4.35

Canterbury

- Graeme Smith 10.49
- Barry Crowson 9.17
- Barry Thomas 9.11
- Graham Banks 7.53
- Graham Miles 7.44
- Alan Kite 4.76
- Jake Rennison 4.30
- Ted Hubbard 4.22 (5 matches only)
- Dave Smith 4.07
- Mike Barkaway 3.77

Crayford

- Archie Wilkinson 9.54
- Tony Childs 7.97
- George Devonport 7.00
- Derek Timms 5.19
- Mick Steel 4.98
- Tony Armstrong 4.55
- Colin Clark 4.00
- Judd Drew 3.91

Crewe

- Paul O'Neil 9.69
- John Jackson 7.94
- Barry Meeks 7.13
- Dai Evans 6.34
- Warren Hawkins 6.10
- Ian Bottomley 5.91
- Dave Parry 5.65
- Glyn Blackburn 5.28
- Rob Jackson 5.04

Doncaster

- George Major 9.58
- Gordon McGregor 9.36
- Chris Harrison 6.82
- Gunther Haslinger 4.99
- Chris Roynon 4.36
- Dennis Wasden 3.89
- Ian Wilson 3.72
- Malcolm Corradine 3.64
- Cliff Emms 3.40

Eastbourne

- Dave Jessup 9.66
- Derek Cook 8.44
- Reg Trott 7.52
- Alby Golden 7.12
- Phil Pratt 7.08
- Gordon Kennett 6.79
- Mac Woolford 6.31
- Laurie Sims 5.98
- Dave Kennett 3.36

Ipswich

- John Harrhy 9.21
- John Louis 8.74
- Pete Bailey 7.60
- Ron Bagley 7.03
- Ted Spittles 5.92
- Neville Slee 4.54
- Dave Whittaker 4.15
- Bernie Aldridge 3.91
- Stan Pepper 3.55

Long Eaton

- Malcolm Shakespeare 8.83
- Ken Vale 6.68
- Geoff Bouchard 5.85
- Roy Carter 5.65
- Gil Farmer 5.20
- Peter Wrathall 5.12
- Colin Tucker 4.43
- Steve Bass 3.21
- Peter Gay 2.67

Middlesbrough

- Tom Leadbitter 9.55
- Roger Mills 7.43
- Bruce Forrester 7.28
- Tim Swales 7.13
- Bob Jameson 6.63
- Dave Durham 5.63
- Pete Reading 5.41

Peterborough

- Andy Ross 9.08
- John Poyser 7.65
- Richard Greer 7.49
- Peter Seaton 7.14
- Brian Davies 6.91
- Joe Hughes 5.88
- John Stayte 5.03
- Pete Saunders 4.61
- Mervyn Hill 4.53

Rayleigh

- Geoff Maloney 8.74
- Hugh Saunders 7.58
- Alan Jackson 7.06
- Terry Stone 6.85
- Nigel Rackett 6.38
- Garry Moore 4.70
- Allan Emmett 4.40
- George Barclay 4.18
- Tony Hall 3.69
- Ian Champion 3.44

Reading

- Richard May 9.57
- Mike Vernam 9.01
- Bernie Leigh 6.91
- Bob Young 6.11
- Phil Pratt 5.36
- Dene Davies 5.28
- John Hammond 5.05
- Cec Platt 4.20

Rochdale

- Eric Broadbelt 10.07
- Taffy Owen 9.43
- Chris Bailey 8.22
- Steve Waplington 8.04
- Alan Wilkinson 8.00
- Paul Tyrer 6.81
- Ken Moss 6.25
- Gerry Richardson 4.86
- Colin Goad 4.46

Romford

- Phil Woodcock 8.87
- Ross Gilbertson 8.70
- Geoff Penniket 8.43
- Des Lukehurst 8.26
- Brian Foote 6.85
- Colin Sanders 6.17
- Ian Gills 5.69
- Charlie Benham 5.35
- Kevin Holden 4.65
- John Hibben 2.83

Workington

- Taffy Owen 9.94 (7 matches only)
- Bob Valentine 9.37
- Malcolm MacKay 7.56
- Geoff Penniket 7.23
- Reg Wilson 6.51
- Lou Sansom 6.13
- Ian Armstrong 5.00
- Chris Blythe 4.22
- Dave Kumeta 3.84
- Vic Lonsdale 3.70

== See also ==
- List of United Kingdom Speedway League Champions
- Knockout Cup (speedway)
