= 2003 Speedway Conference League =

British motorcycle speedway season

- League: Conference League
- Champions: Mildenhall Fen Tigers
- Knockout Cup: Mildenhall Fen Tigers
- Conference Trophy: Boston Barracuda Braves
- Individual: Barrie Evans
- Fours: Rye House Raiders
- Division/s above: 2003 Elite League; 2003 Premier League

The 2003 Speedway Conference League was the third tier/division of British speedway.

== Summary ==
Mildenhall Fen Tigers completed the league and cup double.

== League ==
=== Final table ===
Pos	Team	Played	W	D	L	F	A	Pts	Bonus	Total
1	Mildenhall Fen Tigers	24	18	1	5	1326	917	37	10	47
2	Rye House Raiders	24	18	0	6	1178	936	36	9	45
3	Oxford Silver Machine Academy	24	14	0	10	1179	960	28	11	39
4	Boston Barracuda-Braves	24	15	0	9	1103	1017	30	8	38
5	Swindon Sprockets	24	14	0	10	1042	1036	28	5	33
6	Buxton Hitmen	24	12	1	11	1095	1054	25	7	32
7	Newcastle Gems	24	13	0	11	1072	1070	26	5	31
8	Sheffield Prowlers	24	10	2	12	1115	1016	22	8	30
9	Wimbledon Dons	24	9	1	14	1028	1126	19	5	24
10	Wolverhampton Cubs	24	10	1	13	1005	1116	21	2	23
11	Carmarthen Dragons	24	8	0	16	957	1177	16	4	20
12	Peterborough Pumas	24	6	1	17	950	1187	13	3	16
13	Newport Mavericks	24	5	1	18	895	1243	11	1	12

=== Fixtures and results ===
Home \ Away	BOS	BUX	CAR	MIL	NG	NM	OX	PET	RYE	SHE	SWI	WIM	WOL
Boston Barracuda Braves		48–42	59–31	44–46	56–3	68–22	31–59	61–29	41–49	32–58	44–46	58–32	57–33
Buxton Hitmen	41–49		49–40	47–43	59–31	60–30	56–34	57–33	46–44	54–36	58–31	61–26	52–35
Carmarthen Dragons	45–43	64–26		41–50	47–33	54–35	52–38	48–41	36–54	37–52	41–49	42–48	43–45
Mildenhall Fen Tigers	50–39	56–34	68–22		67–23	65–25	50–40	56–33	48–44	63–26	58–32	54–36	55–34
Newcastle Gems	41–48	57–33	58–29	44–46		57–32	51–37	51–39	50–40	50–39	61–27	51–39	48–41
Newport Mavericks	42–48	45–45	40–49	43–47	37–52		46–43	54–36	34–44	56–33	41–49	52–37	63–25
Oxford Silver Machine Academy	63–27	59–31	57–34	53–37	56–34	70–20		53–37	63–25	54–39	50–40	57–33	61–31
Peterborough Pumas	38–52	41–48	46–44	25–65	43–46	54–36	49–40		32–55	48–42	37–52	48–42	49–41
Rye House Raiders	64–26	50–39	58–30	51–40	53–36	57–32	53–37	57–33		58–31	47–43	69–19	57–33
Sheffield Prowlers	35–37	53–37	67–22	45–45	62–28	63–27	54–35	45–45	64–26		43–47	64–25	62–28
Swindon Sprockets	43–46	54–36	48–29	42–41	45–39	61–29	34–38	43–34	43–29	50–39		54–36	44–45
Wimbledon Dons	44–49	47–43	60–30	44–46	53–37	67–23	46–44	52–38	42–47	55–35	58–32		45–45
Wolverhampton Cubs	31–40	48–41	43–47	50–40	42–51	59–31	50–38	47–42	38–47	57–28	57–33	47–42	

Legend: Blue = home team win; Yellow = draw; Red = away team win.

== Conference League Knockout Cup ==
The 2003 Conference League Knockout Cup was the sixth edition of the Knockout Cup for tier three teams. Mildenhall Fen Tigers were the winners.

First round

Team one	Team two	Score
Buxton	Armadale	48–40, 34–55

Quarter-finals

Team one	Team two	Score
Boston	Wimbledon	55–35, 35–55 rep 46–44, 39–50
Carmarthen	Rye House	40–50, 23–67
Mildenhall	Oxford	53–37, 44–45
Stoke	Armadale	45–45, 31–58

Semi-finals

Team one	Team two	Score
Mildenhall	Boston	55–35, 45–45
Rye House	Armadale	59–31, 50–40

=== Final ===
First leg

18 October 2003

Rye House Raiders Edward Kennett 14 Steve Boxall James Cockle Barry Burchatt	46 – 43	Mildenhall Fen Tigers Paul Lee Danny King x

Rye House Stadium

Second leg

19 October 2003

Mildenhall Fen Tigers Paul Lee Danny King	48 – 43	Rye House Raiders Edward Kennett Steve Boxall James Cockle Barry Burchatt

Mildenhall Stadium

Mildenhall were declared Knockout Cup Champions, winning on aggregate 91–89

== Conference Trophy ==
Pos	Team	M	W	D	L	Pts
1	Boston	14	11	0	5	22
2	Mildenhall	14	9	0	6	18
3	Armadale	14	7	2	5	14
4	Wimbledon	14	7	0	7	14
5	Buxton	14	7	0	7	14
6	Stoke	14	5	1	8	11
7	Trelawny	14	4	0	10	8
8	Carmarthen	14	3	1	10	7

Home \ Away	ARM	BOS	BUX	CAR	MIL	STO	TRE	WIM
Armadale		48–42	50–40	70–20	61–32	51–39	65–24	57–33
Boston	68–22		50–40	62–30	50–40	46–44	51–39	61–29
Buxton	47–43	52–37		37–35	53–37	49–41	52–38	48–41
Carmarthen	45–45	42–51	46–42		41–49	39–51	57–31	43–50
Mildenhall	50–40	44–46	59–31	66–23		52–38	52–36	48–42
Stoke	45–45	50–40	45–44	47–43	36–53		41–49	51–39
Trelawny	55–35	37–53	42–48	39–51	42–48	46–43		60–30
Wimbledon	46–44	44–46	46–41	61–29	48–45	71–19	60–30	

Legend: Blue = home team win; Yellow = draw; Red = away team win.

== Riders' Championship ==
Barrie Evans won the Riders' Championship. The final was held on 30 August at Rye House Stadium.

Pos.	Rider	Team	Total
1	Barrie Evans	Rye House	14
2	Jamie Robertson	Newcastle	11
3	Trevor Harding II	Boston	10
4	Joel Parsons	Rye House	10
5	Tom Brown	Newport	10
6	Craig Branney	Newcastle	10
7	Chris Mills	Oxford	9
8	Rob Finlow	Buxton	9
9	Richard Hall	Boston	8
10	James Wright	Buxton	6
11	James Brundle	Mildenhall	6
12	Ben Powell	Carmarthen/Exeter	3
13	Tommy Allen	Swindon	3
14	Joe Cook	Rye House	3
15	Mark Burrows	Wimbledon	3
16	Danny Norton	Peterborough	2
17	Dean Garrod (res)	Boston	1
18	Gordon Meakins (res)	Carmarthen	1

== Fours ==
Rye House won the Conference League Four-Team Championship final, held on 5 October 2003 at Mildenhall Stadium.

Group A
Pos	Team	Pts	Riders
1	Mildenhall	15	
2	Peterborough	13	
3	Wimbledon	11	
4	Newcastle	9	

Group B
Pos	Team	Pts	Riders
1	Rye House	22	
2	Boston	13	
3	Sheffield	10	
4	Buxton	3	

Final
Pos	Team	Pts	Riders
1	Rye House	30	
2	Mildenhall	29	
3	Peterborough	19	
4	Boston	14	

== See also ==
List of United Kingdom Speedway League Champions
