= 2003 Premier League speedway season =

British motorcycle speedway season

- League: Premier League
- Champions: Edinburgh Monarchs
- Knockout Cup: Isle of Wight Islanders
- Individual: Sean Wilson
- Pairs: Workington Comets
- Fours: Swindon Robins
- Highest average: Frede Schött
- Division/s above: 2003 Elite League
- Division/s below: 2003 Conference League

The 2003 Premier League speedway season was the second division of speedway in the United Kingdom and governed by the Speedway Control Board (SCB), in conjunction with the British Speedway Promoters' Association (BSPA).

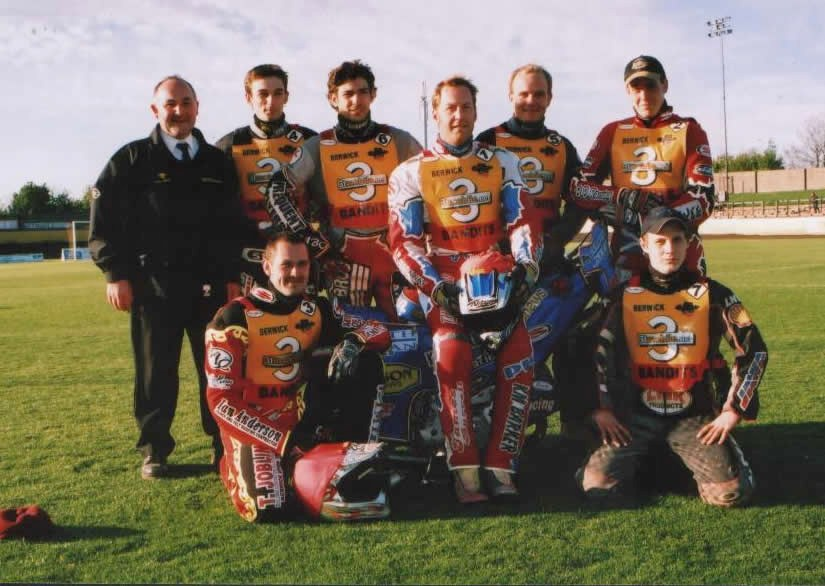
The 2003 Berwick Bandits team

== Season summary ==
The League consisted of 18 teams for the 2003 season with the addition of the King's Lynn Stars who dropped down from the Elite League.

The League was run on a standard format with no play-offs and was won by Edinburgh Monarchs.

== League ==
=== Final table ===
Pos		M	W	D	L	F	A	Pts	Bon	Tot
1	Edinburgh Monarchs	34	26	0	8	1653	1393	52	14	66
2	Sheffield Tigers	34	22	0	12	1655	1397	44	13	57
3	Isle of Wight Islanders	34	22	0	12	1603	1463	44	12	56
4	Swindon Robins	34	20	1	13	1598.5	1451.5	41	12	53
5	Berwick Bandits	34	20	1	13	1563	1465	41	12	53
6	King's Lynn Stars	34	19	1	14	1598	1448	39	13	52
7	Arena Essex Hammers	34	19	0	15	1609	1421	38	12	50
8	Trelawny Tigers	34	19	0	15	1599.5	1470.5	38	12	50
9	Workington Comets	34	19	2	13	1551	1489	40	9	49
10	Newport Wasps	34	17	2	15	1504	1546	36	8	44
11	Newcastle Diamonds	34	17	0	17	1525	1518	34	9	43
12	Glasgow Tigers	34	17	2	15	1479	1529	36	7	43
13	Exeter Falcons	34	13	0	21	1435	1592	26	5	31
14	Rye House Rockets	34	12	1	21	1441	1612	25	5	30
15	Stoke Potters	34	10	1	23	1443	1597	21	3	24
16	Reading Racers	34	9	2	23	1404	1653	20	2	22
17	Somerset Rebels	34	9	2	23	1357	1705	20	2	22
18	Hull Vikings	34	8	1	25	1395	1663	17	2	19

=== Fixtures and results ===
Home \ Away	AE	BER	ED	EX	GLA	HV	IOW	KL	ND	NW	RR	RYE	SHE	SOM	STO	SWI	TT	WOR
Arena Essex Hammers		46–44	45–48	63–27	49–23	53–36	49–42	55–35	52–38	65–24	56–34	53–37	53–36	56–34	60–30	51–42	54–36	52–38
Berwick Bandits	53–37		49–41	51–17	55–35	53–37	52–39	46–44	63–27	48–41	53–37	67–23	37–53	58–32	58–32	47–43	48–42	51–39
Edinburgh Monarchs	40–32	60–30		63–27	56–34	57–33	53–36	52–38	48–42	49–40	60–30	55–34	62–28	55–35	55–35	48–42	49–44	48–42
Exeter Falcons	46–44	44–46	55–35		44–46	58–32	48–42	59–31	53–37	48–42	57–33	62–27	44–46	55–35	44–46	49–41	53–37	59–30
Glasgow Tigers	48–42	47–42	37–55	60–30		51–39	47–43	43–35	61–28	52–38	59–31	47–43	47–42	55–35	50–40	46–44	46–44	34–38
Hull Vikings	50–40	40–50	42–48	50–39	45–45		44–46	50–40	42–48	41–48	56–34	49–41	47–43	44–46	49–41	48–42	40–50	44–46
Isle of Wight Islanders	44–47	47–43	48–42	54–35	54–36	59–30		52–40	51–39	45–44	50–40	61–29	49–42	54–36	54–35	50–40	53–40	55–35
King's Lynn Stars	48–42	60–30	52–37	65–25	59–31	58–32	58–32		49–41	57–32	49–41	48–42	46–44	59–31	52–37	44–46	54–38	58–32
Newcastle Diamonds	52–38	48–42	43–47	57–33	53–37	53–37	54–36	43–47		57–33	46–44	50–40	48–41	52–38	43–29	53–37	52–38	44–46
Newport Wasps	47–42	44–46	50–40	61–29	45–44	48–42	43–47	52–38	50–40		49–41	51–39	50–40	50–39	48–41	40–50	48–42	49–41
Reading Racers	46–44	41–49	40–50	49–41	45–45	50–40	44–46	44–44	40–49	40–50		48–42	47–42	54–36	47–43	42–48	42–48	47–43
Rye House Rockets	48–42	62–27	43–47	55–35	49–39	47–43	50–40	49–41	49–41	45–45	48–42		44–46	57–33	35–54	44.5–45.5	52–38	50–40
Sheffield Tigers	49–41	55–36	58–32	51–39	52–38	58–32	47–42	57–33	61–29	57–33	58–32	56–34		64–26	55–35	54–36	55–34	49–40
Somerset Rebels	42–48	45–45	44–46	48–42	46–44	52–38	37–53	38–52	47–43	44–46	46–45	50–40	37–53		58–32	42–48	46–44	46–46
Stoke Potters	44–48	53–37	44–46	55–35	44–46	60–32	43–47	46–44	43–47	46–44	44–46	57–32	42–48	55–35		46–44	42–49	45–45
Swindon Robins	49–41	57–26	51–39	48–36	49–41	56–34	43–47	52–37	50–42	45–45	51–39	49–41	50–40	60–30	55–35		48–42	52–37
Trelawny Tigers	55–35	53–37	44–46	62–28	59–31	53–37	48–42	44–46	47–46	47–43	51–39	60.5–29.5	57–33	52–38	55–34	48–42		52–38
Workington Comets	56–34	46–44	46–44	50–39	56–34	50–40	50–43	53–37	49–40	59–31	56–34	54–36	45–44	60–30	54–35	47–43	44–46	

Legend: Blue = home team win; Yellow = draw; Red = away team win.

== Premier League Knockout Cup ==
The 2003 Premier League Knockout Cup was the 36th edition of the Knockout Cup for tier two teams. Isle of Wight Islanders were the winners of the competition.

First round

Date	Team one	Score	Team two
11/04	Somerset	43-49	Newport
06/04	Newport	61-35	Somerset
09/04	King's Lynn	52-43	Workington
22/03	Workington	46-43	King's Lynn

Second round

Date	Team one	Score	Team two
05/05	Reading	51-45	Trelawny
13/05	Trelawny	65-30	Reading
13/05	Isle of Wight	54-38	Swindon
15/05	Swindon	49-51	Isle of Wight
12/05	Exeter	50-43	Newport
11/05	Newport	47-43	Exeter
10/05	Berwick	52-36	Glasgow
11/05	Glasgow	42-42	Berwick
15/05	Sheffield	56-43	Hull
14/05	Hull	48-41	Sheffield
28/05	King's Lynn	62-34	Edinburgh
16/05	Edinburgh	59-37	King's Lynn
18/04	Arena Essex	44-46	Rye House
19/04	Rye House	44-46	Arena Essex
11/05	Newcastle	50-40	Stoke
10/05	Stoke	51-44	Newcastle
23/05 replay	Arena Essex	55-40	Rye House
26/05 replay	Rye House	44-46	Arena Essex

Quarter-finals

Date	Team one	Score	Team two
24/06	Isle of Wight	61 34	Exeter
23/06	Exeter	53 42	Isle of Wight
24/06	Trelawny	61 34	Berwick
21/06	Berwick	55 42	Trelawny
26/06	Sheffield	50 48	King's Lynn
02/07	King's Lynn	48 49	Sheffield
27/06	Arena Essex	55 41	Newcastle
22/06	Newcastle	49 41	Arena Essex

Semi-finals

Date	Team one	Score	Team two
26/08	Isle of Wight	63-27	Trelawny
12/08	Trelawny	53-37	Isle of Wight
04/09	Sheffield	51-39	Arena Essex
29/08	Arena Essex	50-40	Sheffield

Final

First leg

7 October 2003

Isle of Wight Islanders Adam Shields 12 Paul Pickering (guest) 9 Sebastian Trésarrieu 8 Danny Bird 7 Glen Phillips 5 Gary Phelps 5 Tony Dart 0	49 – 44	Sheffield Tigers Brent Werner 12 Sean Wilson 10 Andrew Moore 8 James Birkinshaw 5 Ricky Ashworth 5 Richard Hall 4 Ross Brady R/R

Smallbrook Stadium

Second leg

16 October 2003

Sheffield Tigers James Birkinshaw 11 Andrew Moore 9 Richard Hall 8 Ricky Ashworth 8 Sean Wilson 7 Brent Werner 4 Ross Brady R/R	47 – 46	Isle of Wight Islanders Adam Shields 17 Paul Pickering (guest) 12 Danny Bird 6 Sebastian Trésarrieu 5 Glen Phillips 4 Stephane Trésarrieu 2 Gary Phelps 0

Owlerton Stadium

Isle of Wight were declared Knockout Cup Champions, winning on aggregate 95–91.

== British League Cup ==
The British League Cup (BL Cup for short) was the supplementary competition for both the Elite League and Premier League for the 2003 season. See 2003 Elite League speedway season for the results and tables.

== Riders' Championship ==
Sean Wilson won the Riders' Championship for the second time. The final was held on 28 September at Owlerton Stadium.

Pos.	Rider	Pts	Total	SF	Final
1	(England) Sean Wilson	3 2 3 3 1	12	3	3
2	(Australia) Adam Shields	3 3 3 2 3	14	-	2
3	(England) Carl Stonehewer	3 3 3 3 3	15	-	1
4	(Australia) Craig Watson	2 3 2 2 2	11	2	0
5	(England) Garry Stead	2 0 2 3 2	9	1	
6	(England) Chris Harris	ex 2 3 1 3	9	0	
7	(Australia) Shane Parker	3 0 0 3 2	8		
8	(Denmark) Kenneth Bjerre	1 3 0 2 1	7		
9	(Denmark) Frede Schött	2 2 1 1 1	7		
10	(Finland) Joonas Kylmäkorpi	1 1 1 0 3	6		
11	(Czech Republic) Michal Makovský	1 2 2 0 1	6		
12	(England) Paul Fry	ex 1 1 1 2	5		
13	(England) Andrew Appleton	1 1 2 1 0	5		
14	(Australia) Mark Lemon	2 1 0 ex 0	3		
15	(Denmark) Jan Staechmann	0 ex 1 2 0	3		
16	(Scotland) James Grieves	0 0 0 0 0	0		

- f=fell, r-retired, ex=excluded, ef=engine failure t=touched tapes

== Pairs ==
The Premier League Pairs Championship was held at Derwent Park on 19 July. The event was won by Workington (Carl Stonehewer and Simon Stead) who beat Newport (Frank Smart and Niels Kristian Iversen) in the final.

== Fours ==
Swindon Robins won the Premier League Four-Team Championship, which was held on 27 July 2003, at the Abbey Stadium.

Group A
Pos	Team	Pts	Riders
1	Swindon	15	
2	Glasgow	12	
3	Edinburgh	10	
4	isle of Wight	10	

Group B
Pos	Team	Pts	Riders
1	Newport	15	
2	Trelawny	13	
3	King's Lynn	11	
4	Arena Essex	9	

Final
Pos	Team	Pts	Riders
1	Swindon	25	Gjedde 9, Allen, Fry, Neath
2	Trelawny	22	Harris 8, Zagar 8
3	Newport	21	Smart 6, Iversen 6, Watson, Atkin
4	Glasgow	4	Stancl 2, Doolan 2

== Leading averages ==
Rider	Team	Average
(Denmark) Frede Schött	Edinburgh	10.11
(Australia) Adam Shields	Isle of Wight	9.99
(Denmark) Kenneth Bjerre	Newcastle	9.80
(Finland) Joonas Kylmäkorpi	Arena Essex	9.69
(England) Carl Stonehewer	Workington	9.68
(England) Leigh Lanham	Arena Essex	9.67
(Denmark) Charlie Gjedde	Swindon	9.60
(Australia) Shane Parker	Kings Lynn	9.59
(England) Sean Wilson	Sheffield	9.48
(England) Simon Stead	Workington	9.47

== Riders & final averages ==
Arena Essex

- Joonas Kylmäkorpi 9.69
- Leigh Lanham 9.67
- Kelvin Tatum 8.39
- David Ruud 7.76
- Henning Bager 6.96
- Joel Parsons 6.00
- Lee Herne 5.94
- Jason King 4.74
- Danny King 3.82
- Andy Galvin 3.65

Berwick

- Michal Makovský 7.81
- Paul Bentley 7.76
- David Meldrum 7.28
- Josef Franc 7.03
- Adrian Rymel 6.88
- Claus Kristensen 6.86
- Carlos Villar 5.23
- Rob Grant Jr. 4.22

Edinburgh

- Frede Schott 10.11
- Peter Carr 9.00
- Magnus Karlsson 7.58
- Rory Schlein 7.55
- Theo Pijper 6.33
- Wayne Carter 4.77
- Matthew Wethers 3.84
- Barry Campbell 2.78

Exeter

- Michael Coles 8.48
- Seemond Stephens 8.05
- Mark Simmonds 6.92
- Lee Smethills 6.71
- Scott Smith 6.34
- Krister Marsh 5.82
- Roger Lobb 5.11
- Corey Blackman 3.76

Glasgow

- George Štancl 9.38
- James Grieves 8.72
- Kevin Doolan 6.37
- Les Collins 6.21
- Christian Henry 5.19
- David McAllan 4.56
- Trent Leverington 4.22
- Ross Brady 2.40

Hull

- Paul Thorp 7.98
- Garry Stead 7.39
- Bjorn Hansen 6.58
- Shaun Tacey 6.28
- Neil Collins 6.26
- Lee Dicken 4.66
- Simon Cartwright 4.61
- Barrie Evans 3.87

Isle of Wight

- Adam Shields 9.99
- Danny Bird 8.95
- Ray Morton 8.87
- Sebastien Trésarrieu 6.34
- Glen Phillips 4.67
- Gary Phelps 4.18
- Chris Mills 4.05
- Mathieu Trésarrieu 3.38
- Stéphane Trésarrieu 3.33

King's Lynn

- Shane Parker 9.59
- Tom P. Madsen 9.54
- Davey Watt 9.44
- Tomáš Topinka 9.40
- Trevor Harding 5.49
- Adam Allott 5.47
- James Brundle 4.61
- Darren Mallett 2.86
- Mark Thompson 2.33

Newcastle

- Bjarne Pedersen 10.17
- Kenneth Bjerre 9.80
- Stuart Robson 8.69
- Kevin Little 7.73
- Richard Juul 5.49
- Lee Dicken 5.42
- William Lawson 4.93
- Kristian Lund 4.44
- Jamie Robertson 4.27
- Craig Branney 3.87
- Steffen Mell 2.71

Newport

- Craig Watson 9.17
- Niels Kristian Iversen 9.13
- Frank Smart 8.39
- Tony Atkin 6.98
- Carl Wilkinson 4.98
- Chris Schramm 4.76
- Joel Parsons 2.84
- Karl Mason 1.56

Reading

- Janusz Kołodziej 8.95
- Andrew Appleton 7.67
- Phil Morris 7.09
- Jonas Davidsson 6.19
- Scott Smith 5.80
- Paul Clews 5.30
- Danny King 4.32
- Shane Colvin 4.25
- Joel Parsons 3.79
- Danny Norton 1.27

Rye House

- Edward Kennett 7.82
- Scott Robson 7.62
- Brent Werner 7.07
- Nigel Sadler 6.32
- Brett Woodifield 6.14
- David Mason 5.14
- Mark Courtney 5.08

Sheffield

- Sean Wilson 9.48
- Andre Compton 8.54
- Ricky Ashworth 7.57
- Andrew Moore 7.54
- Scott Smith 6.86
- Ross Brady 5.79
- James Birkinshaw 5.13
- Richard Hall 4.93
- Ben Wilson 3.81

Somerset

- Mark Lemon 8.03
- Glenn Cunningham 7.10
- Marián Jirout 6.63
- Matt Read 6.40
- Steve Bishop 6.21
- Graeme Gordon 5.89
- Stephan Katt 5.33
- Rob Finlow 3.77
- James Mann 3.03
- Simon Dyminski 2.84
- Paul Candy 0.67

Stoke

- Jan Staechmann 8.92
- Robbie Kessler 8.00
- Paul Pickering 8.00
- Scott Smith 6.72
- Alan Mogridge 6.43
- Jon Armstrong 5.79
- Rob Grant Jr. 4.84
- Joe Cook 2.69
- Nick Simmons 2.55

Swindon

- Charlie Gjedde 9.60
- Oliver Allen 8.92
- Chris Neath 7.80
- Paul Fry 7.38
- Jamie Smith 5.84
- Malcolm Holloway 4.60
- Ritchie Hawkins 4.14
- Tommy Allen 2.80

Trelawny

- Chris Harris 9.33
- Matej Žagar 9.12
- Pavel Ondrašík 8.02
- Steve Masters 7.48
- Mirko Wolter 6.45
- Emiliano Sanchez 6.33
- Richard Wolff 4.77
- Simon Phillips 4.10
- Malcolm Holloway 4.10
- Tom Brown 2.60

Workington

- Carl Stonehewer 9.68
- Simon Stead 9.47
- Rusty Harrison 7.23
- Kauko Nieminen 5.70
- Blair Scott 4.85
- Aidan Collins 4.75
- Chris Collins 3.36

== See also ==
- List of United Kingdom Speedway League Champions
- Knockout Cup (speedway)
