= 2002 Speedway Conference League =

British motorcycle speedway season

- League: Conference League
- Champions: Peterborough Pumas
- Knockout Cup: Buxton Hitmen
- Conference Trophy: Mildenhall Fen Tigers
- Individual: James Birkinshaw
- Division/s above: 2002 Elite League; 2002 Premier League

The 2002 Speedway Conference League was the third tier/division of British speedway.

== Summary ==
The title was won by Peterborough Pumas, the junior club belonging to the Peterborough Panthers.

On 1 May, David Nix was killed after crashing into the fence during the match between Newcastle and King's Lynn at the Norfolk Arena.

== Final league table ==
Pos	Team	Played	W	D	L	F	A	Pts	Bonus	Total
1	Peterborough Pumas	20	16	0	4	1008	786	32	8	40
2	Sheffield Prowlers	20	15	0	5	1008	780	30	9	39
3	Mildenhall Fen Tigers	20	13	0	7	988	799	26	9	35
4	Rye House Raiders	20	12	2	6	1005	789	26	7	33
5	Buxton Hitmen	20	11	0	9	919	875	22	5	27
6	Boston Barracudas	20	9	1	10	874	925	19	5	24
7	Carmarthen Dragons	19	9	0	10	801	902	18	3	21
8	Newcastle Gems	20	7	2	11	851	842	16	3	19
9	King's Lynn Kids	20	6	0	14	778	1014	12	3	15
10	Newport Mavericks	19	5	1	23	737	964	11	1	12
11	Wimbledon Dons	18	2	0	16	709	902	4	0	4

== Fixtures & results ==
Home \ Away	BOS	BUX	CAR	KL	MIL	NG	NM	PET	RYE	SHE	WIM
Boston Barracudas		49–41	58–32	58–32	42–48	43–47	53–37	38–52	45–45	50–37	54–35
Buxton Hitmen	58–31		43–47	61–29	47–43	50–40	60–30	41–49	47–42	49–41	54–36
Carmarthen Dragons	58–32	44–46		53–35	43–47	50–40	47–43	44–43	50–40	42–46	56–34
King's Lynn Kids	36–54	39–51	61–29		45–44	47–43	55–35	28–62	29–61	38–48	52–38
Mildenhall Fen Tigers	49–41	56–34	62–29	54–36		57–33	63–20	44–45	54–36	49–41	60–30
Newcastle Gems	43–47	46–44	48–42	51–38	38–49		57–33	39–50	45–45	32–56	48–42
Newport Mavericks	42–48	46–44	43–46	52–38	47–43	45–45		48–42	46–44	32–58	n/a
Peterborough Pumas	63–27	50–39	59–31	59–31	51–39	61–30	47–43		60–30	48–42	47–42
Rye House Raiders	61–30	55–35	65–25	65–25	52–38	53–35	65–25	52–38		58–32	58–32
Sheffield Prowlers	60–33	60–29	57–33	53–37	48–42	48–42	55–35	54–36	60–30		64–26
Wimbledon Dons	49–41	42–48	n/a	43–47	41–47	42–49	54–35	44–46	40–48	39–48	

Legend: Blue = home team win; Yellow = draw; Red = away team win.

== Conference League Knockout Cup ==
The 2002 Conference League Knockout Cup was the fifth edition of the Knockout Cup for tier three teams. Buxton Hitmen were the winners.

Quarter-finals

Team one	Team two	Score
Newcastle	Sheffield	45–45, 32–58
Wolverhampton	Newport	23–66, 37–51
Mildenhall	Buxton	40–50, 47–43

Semi-finals

Team one	Team two	Score
Buxton	Sheffield	61–28, 47–43
Newport	Rye House	40–49, 41–49

=== Final ===
First leg

13 October 2002

Buxton William Beveridge 15 Aidan Collins 14 Carl Belfield 12 Chris Collins 8 Lee Derbyshire 4 James Wright 4 Richard Moss 1	58 – 41	Rye House Ed Kennett 9 Scott Courtney 7 Steve Boxall 6 Luke Bowen 3 Simon Wolstenholme 3 Barry Evans 3 Daniel Giffard 2

Buxton Raceway

Second leg

16 October 2002

Rye House Steve Boxall 15 Ed Kennett 13 Scott Courtney 8 Daniel Giffard 7 Barry Evans 4 Luke Bowen 1 Simon Wolstenholme 0	49 – 41	Buxton Aidan Collins 17 Chris Collins 8 James Wright 7 Carl Belfield 5 William Beveridge R/R Richard Moss 3 Lee Derbyshire 2 Alan Brown 0

Rye House Stadium

Buxton were declared Knockout Cup Champions, winning on aggregate 99–81.

== Conference Trophy ==
Pos	Team	M	W	D	L	Pts
1	Mildenhall	10	8	0	2	16
2	Carmarthen	10	7	0	3	14
3	Buxton	10	6	0	4	12
4	Wimbledon	10	4	0	6	8
5	Swindon	10	3	0	7	6
6	Wolverhampton	10	2	0	8	4

Home \ Away	BUX	CAR	MIL	SWI	WIM	WOL
Buxton		42–48	46–43	51–37	44–46	70–20
Carmarthen	40–50		50–40	54–38	47–41	51–38
Mildenhall	55–35	45–44		45–44	60–30	67–23
Swindon	49–41	45–46	39–54		52–38	54–36
Wimbledon	28–62	35–55	37–53	53–37		51–35
Wolverhampton	33–56	49–42	27–63	46–43	38–51	

Legend: Blue = home team win; Yellow = draw; Red = away team win.

== Riders' Championship ==
James Birkinshaw won the Riders' Championship. The final was held on 31 August at Rye House Stadium.

Pos.	Rider	Team	Total
1	James Birkinshaw	Boston	14
2	Edward Kennett	Rye House	13
3	Jamie Robertson	Newcastle	12
4	Wayne Broadhurst	Mildenhall	12
5	Joe Cook	King's Lynn	10
6	Rory Schlein	Sheffield	9
7	Craig Branney	Newcastle	7
8	Chris Mills	King's Lynn	7
9	Steve Braidford (res)	Wolverhampton	6
10	James Wright	Buxton	6
11	Danny King	Peterborough	5
12	James Brundle	Mildenhall	5
13	Stuart McCabe	Peterborough	4
14	Martin Williams	Wimbledon	4
15	Adam Pryor	Peterborough	4
16	Ben Wilson	Sheffield	1
17	Simon Wolstenholme (res)	Rye House	1
18	Barrie Evans (res)	Rye House	0

== See also ==
List of United Kingdom Speedway League Champions
