= 2003 Elite League speedway season =

British motorcycle speedway season

- League: Sky Sports Elite League
- Champions: Poole Pirates
- Knockout Cup: Poole Pirates
- British League Cup: Poole Pirates
- Riders Championship: Lee Richardson
- Highest average: Jason Crump
- Division/s below: Premier League; Conference League

The 2003 Elite League speedway season was the 69th season of the top division of speedway in the United Kingdom and governed by the Speedway Control Bureau (SCB), in conjunction with the British Speedway Promoters' Association (BSPA).

== Season summary ==
In 2003, the league decreased to eight teams, after the King's Lynn dropped to the Premier League and reverted to their traditional name of Stars. They also lost the promotion of Nigel Wagstaff, who took over at Oxford, which resulted in he name Cheetahs replaced with the Silver Machine name from King's Lynn. King's Lynn's leading riders Nicki Pedersen and Sebastian Ułamek also switched to Oxford. Freddie Eriksson went to Ipswich. Oxford also brought in former World Champion Greg Hancock from Coventry but lost Leigh Adams and Lukáš Dryml to Poole.

Poole's decision to recruit Adams and Dryml was instrumental because they went on to claim the title. Adams finished top of the league averages and he was backed up by their five time World Champion Tony Rickardsson and the vastly improved form of Magnus Zetterström. Poole went on to complete the double by winning the Knockout Cup.

== League ==
=== Final table ===
Pos		M	W	D	L	F	A	Pts	Bon	Tot
1	Poole Pirates	28	20	1	7	1335	1182	41	11	52
2	Coventry Bees	28	17	0	11	1295	1224	34	9	43
3	Peterborough Panthers	28	16	0	12	1325	1195	32	8	40
4	Oxford Silver Machine	28	16	0	12	1295	1224	32	8	40
5	Wolverhampton Wolves	28	14	1	13	1248	1265	29	6	35
6	Eastbourne Eagles	28	12	1	15	1261	1250	25	7	32
7	Belle Vue Aces	28	9	1	18	1219	1298	19	5	24
8	Ipswich Witches	28	6	0	22	1088	1428	12	0	12

= Qualified for Play Offs

==== 'A' Fixtures ====
Home \ Away	BV	COV	EAS	IPS	OX	PET	PP	WOL
Belle Vue Aces		43–47	41–49	56–34	44–46	42–48	45–44	49–41
Coventry Bees	50–40		48–42	48–42	49–41	51–39	43–47	49–41
Eastbourne Eagles	47–43	47–43		50–40	47–43	55–35	43–46	47–42
Ipswich Witches	47–43	36–54	49–41		39–51	42–47	40–50	47–43
Oxford Silver Machine	51–39	46–44	47–43	51–38		48–42	41–49	58–32
Peterborough Panthers	53–37	43–47	52–38	62–28	59–31		47–43	53–37
Poole Pirates	54–36	43–47	60–30	49–40	51–39	46–44		58–32
Wolverhampton Wolves	48–42	51–39	48–42	49–41	53–37	53–37	45–45	

Legend: Blue = home team win; Yellow = draw; Red = away team win.

==== 'B' Fixtures ====
Home \ Away	BV	COV	EAS	IPS	OX	PET	PP	WOL
Belle Vue Aces		47–43	45–45	51–37	49–41	47–43	47–43	51–39
Coventry Bees	48–42		51–38	54–36	47–43	52–38	43–47	49–41
Eastbourne Eagles	56–34	44–46		54–36	52–38	61–29	43–47	46–38
Ipswich Witches	46–44	46–44	47–43		41–49	33–57	39–51	40–50
Oxford Silver Machine	52–38	52–38	46–44	58–32		46–44	62–28	62–28
Peterborough Panthers	53–37	48–42	56–34	62–28	54–36		48–42	58–32
Poole Pirates	46–44	52–38	47–43	57–33	46–44	53–37		47–43
Wolverhampton Wolves	47–43	49–41	53–37	60–30	54–36	53–37	46–44	

Legend: Blue = home team win; Yellow = draw; Red = away team win.

==== Play-offs ====
Semi-final decided over one leg. Grand Final decided by aggregate scores over two legs.

Semi-finals

- Poole Pirates 48-42 Oxford Silver Machine
- Coventry Bees 60-30 Peterborough Panthers

Final

First leg

29 September 2003

Coventry Bees Andreas Jonsson 15 Lee Richardson 7 Jason Bunyan 7 Billy Hamill 6 Billy Janniro 4 Robson 4 Ryan Fisher 1	44 - 45	Poole Pirates Tony Rickardsson 11 Todd Wiltshire 9 Leigh Adams 7 Bjarne Pedersen 6 Aleš Dryml Jr. 4 Davey Watt 4 Antonio Lindbäck 4

Brandon Stadium

Second leg

6 October 2003

Poole Pirates Aleš Dryml Jr. 14 Tony Rickardsson 13 Leigh Adams 11 Mark Loram 8 Bjarne Pedersen 5 Antonio Lindbäck 4 Davey Watt 0	55 - 35	Coventry Bees Andreas Jonsson 13 Ryan Fisher 6 Billy Janniro 6 Lee Richardson 4 Joe Screen 3 Robson 2 Jason Bunyan 1

Poole Stadium

The Poole Pirates were declared League Champions, winning on aggregate 100-79.

== Elite League Knockout Cup ==
The 2003 Elite League Knockout Cup was the 65th edition of the Knockout Cup for tier one teams. Poole Pirates were the winners of the competition.

Quarter-finals

Date	Team one	Score	Team two
23/05	Peterborough	52-38	Coventry
09/05	Oxford	55-35	Ipswich
05/05	Ipswich	41-49	Oxford
21/04	Coventry	52-38	Peterborough
21/04	Wolverhampton	57-33	Belle Vue
18/04	Belle Vue	49-41	Wolverhampton
18/04	Eastbourne	40-32	Poole
18/04	Poole	56-34	Eastbourne
10/09 (replay)	Peterborough	44-46	Coventry
03/09 (replay)	Coventry	61-29	Peterborough

Semi-finals

Date	Team one	Score	Team two
11/10	Coventry	50-40	Wolverhampton
10/10	Oxford	46-44	Poole
08/10	Wolverhampton	48-41	Coventry
15/09	Poole	56-34	Oxford

Final

First leg

23 October 2003

Poole Pirates Tony Rickardsson 13 Leigh Adams 12 Mark Loram 8 Aleš Dryml Jr. 5 Bjarne Pedersen 3 Garry Stead 3 Antonio Lindbäck 2	46 - 42	Coventry Bees Billy Janniro 14 Lee Richardson 10 Ryan Fisher 8 Andreas Jonsson 7 Jason Bunyan 2 Stuart Robson 1 Billy Hamill R/R

Wimborne Road

Second leg

25 October 2003

Coventry Bees Andreas Jonsson 12 Ryan Fisher 10 Lee Richardson 7 Mikael Max (guest) 7 Billy Janniro 7 Jason Bunyan 2 Stuart Robson 1	46 - 44	Poole Pirates Leigh Adams 12 Tony Rickardsson 12 Bjarne Pedersen 8 Mark Loram 6 Garry Stead 3 Aleš Dryml Jr. 2 Antonio Lindbäck 1

Brandon Stadium

The Poole Pirates were declared Knockout Cup Champions, winning on aggregate 90-88.

== British League Cup ==
Th British League Cup (BL Cup for short) was the supplementary competition for both the Elite League and Premier League for the 2003 season.

Group A

Pos	Team	M	W	D	L	Pts
1	Arena Essex+	8	5	0	3	10
2	Rye House	8	5	0	3	10
3	Ipswich	8	4	0	4	8
4	King's Lynn	8	4	0	4	8
5	Peterborough	8	2	0	6	4

Group B

Pos	Team	M	W	D	L	Pts
1	Sheffield	8	6	0	2	12
2	Belle Vue	8	5	0	3	10
3	Coventry	8	4	1	3	9
4	Stoke	8	2	1	5	5
5	Hull	8	2	0	6	4

+ Arena Essex had not completed their fixtures at the time of the quarter-final draw, which led to Rye House progressing from the group.

Group C

Pos	Team	M	W	D	L	Pts
1	Workington	8	5	1	2	11
2	Edinburgh	8	5	1	2	11
3	Glasgow	8	4	0	4	8
4	Berwick	8	3	0	5	6
5	Newcastle	8	2	0	6	4

Group D

Pos	Team	M	W	D	L	Pts
1	Eastbourne	8	5	2	1	12
2	Isle of Wight	8	4	2	2	10
3	Oxford	8	4	1	3	9
4	Swindon	8	3	2	3	8
5	Reading	8	0	1	7	1

Group E

Pos	Team	M	W	D	L	Pts
1	Wolverhampton	10	8	0	2	16
2	Poole	10	7	0	3	14
3	Newport	10	5	1	4	11
4	Exeter	10	5	1	4	11
5	Trelawny	10	4	1	5	9
6	Somerset	10	0	0	10	0

Home \ Away	AE	IPS	KL	PET	RYE
Arena Essex		54–36	56–34	64–27	49–41
Ipswich	52–38		53–37	48–42	46–44
King's Lynn	50–40	48–41		47–43	49–41
Peterborough	43–47	45–44	47–45		44–46
Rye House	53–37	46–44	55–35	42–36	

Legend: Blue = home team win; Yellow = draw; Red = away team win.

Home \ Away	BV	COV	HUL	SHE	STO
Belle Vue		51–35	55–35	55–35	44–46
Coventry	53–36		56–35	48–42	59–31
Hull	38–52	47–43		39–51	49–41
Sheffield	50–42	47–43	55–35		50–40
Stoke	35–55	45–45	54–36	44–46	

Legend: Blue = home team win; Yellow = draw; Red = away team win.

Home \ Away	BER	ED	GLA	NEW	WOR
Berwick		52–38	47–42	62–30	42–48
Edinburgh	53–37		50–40	47–43	53–39
Glasgow	50–41	50–40		50–39	37–53
Newcastle	51–39	42–48	44–46		46–43
Workington	50–40	45–45	55–35	50–40	

Legend: Blue = home team win; Yellow = draw; Red = away team win.

Home \ Away	EAS	IOW	OX	REA	SWI
Eastbourne		55–34	46–38	60–30	52–37
Isle of Wight	45–45		47–43	56–34	49–41
Oxford	45–45	50–40		53–37	50–40
Reading	42–51	40–50	40–50		45–45
Swindon	51–39	45–45	48–37	52–38	

Legend: Blue = home team win; Yellow = draw; Red = away team win.

Home \ Away	EX	NEW	PP	SOM	TRE	WOL
Exeter		50–40	59–31	54–36	54–39	40–50
Newport	56–34		42.5–47.5	59–31	46–44	51–39
Poole	58–32	49–41		51–39	52–38	44–46
Somerset	43–47	42–48	39–50		42–49	33–57
Trelawny	63–27	45–45	44–51	59–31		48–42
Wolverhampton	65–25	54–36	56–37	57–33	60–27	

Legend: Blue = home team win; Yellow = draw; Red = away team win.

Quarter-finals

Team one	Team two	Score
Wolverhampton	Edinburgh	47–42, 51–39
Belle Vue	Rye House	49–41, 48–42
Sheffield	Eastbourne	43–47, 31–59
Workington	Poole	40–50, 33–57

Semi-finals

Team one	Team two	Score
Wolverhampton	Eastbourne	43–46, 42–51
Belle Vue	Poole	41–49, 44–46

Final

Team one	Team two	Score
Eastbourne	Poole	48–42, 34–56

== Riders' Championship ==
Lee Richardson won the Riders' Championship. The final was held at Brandon Stadium on 18 October.

Pos.	Rider	Pts	Total	SF	Final
1	(England) Lee Richardson	2 3 2 2 2	11	2	3
2	(Sweden) Andreas Jonsson	3 0 3 3 1	10	3	2
3	(England) Scott Nicholls	3 0 3 3 2	11	x	1
4	(Australia) Jason Crump	2 3 2 3 3	13	x	ret
5	(United States) Billy Janniro	2 3 2 2 1	10	1	
6	(England) Dean Barker	3 2 3 3 0	11	0	
7	(England) Mark Loram	3 1 1 0 3	8		
8	(Australia) Todd Wiltshire	1 2 1 1 2	7		
9	(Sweden) Tony Rickardsson	0 2 3 1 0	6		
10	(Sweden) Mikael Max	1 3 0 2 0	6		
11	(Australia) Leigh Adams	2 2 1 0 1	6		
12	(Sweden) Peter Karlsson	0 1 0 1 3	5		
13	(Denmark) Charlie Gjedde	0 1 2 2 0	5		
14	(England) Joe Screen	1 1 0 0 2	4		
15	(Australia) Jason Lyons	1 0 0 1 1	3		
16	(England) David Norris	0 0 1 0	1		
17	(England) Chris Harris (res)	3	3		

- r-retired

== Leading final averages ==
Rider	Team	Average
(Australia) Jason Crump	Belle Vue	10.79
(Australia) Leigh Adams	Poole	10.14
(Sweden) Magnus Zetterström	Poole	10.07
(Sweden) Tony Rickardsson	Poole	9.64
(England) Scott Nicholls	Ipswich	9.41
(Denmark) Nicki Pedersen	Oxford	9.33
(Sweden) Mikael Max	Wolverhampton	9.28
(United States) Greg Hancock	Oxford	9.28
(Australia) Ryan Sullivan	Peterborough	9.23
(United States) Billy Hamill	Coventry	9.23

== Riders & final averages ==
Belle Vue

- (Australia) Jason Crump 10.79
- (England) Joe Screen 8.24
- (Australia) Jason Lyons 7.93
- (Australia) Steve Johnston 6.78
- (England) Carl Stonehewer 6.52
- (Australia) Rory Schlein 6.21
- (Australia) Craig Watson 5.23
- (England) Neil Collins 5.15
- (United States) Chris Manchester 4.79
- (United States) Josh Larsen 4.78
- (Czech Republic) Aleš Dryml Jr. 4.31
- (Denmark) Jesper Olsen 2.67
- (England) James Wright 2.46

Coventry

- (United States) Billy Hamill 9.23
- (England) Lee Richardson 8.78
- (Sweden) Andreas Jonsson 8.49
- (United States) Billy Janniro7.72
- (England) Stuart Robson 6.84
- (United States) Ryan Fisher 5.97
- (New Zealand) Jason Bunyan 3.71
- (England) Richard Hall 3.27
- (Australia) Scott James 2.82

Eastbourne

- (Denmark) Nicki Pedersen 8.48
- (England) Dean Barker 8.08
- (England) Mark Loram 8.05
- (England) David Norris 7.83
- (England) Joe Screen 7.81
- (Australia) Adam Shields 7.44
- (Finland) Joonas Kylmäkorpi 7.36
- (England) Garry Stead 5.89
- (Denmark) Ulrich Østergaard 5.70
- (England) Matt Read 5.08
- (England) Glenn Cunningham 4.00
- (Australia) Joel Parsons 4.00
- (Sweden) Peter Ljung 2.67

Ipswich

- (England) Scott Nicholls 9.41
- (Poland) Jarosław Hampel 6.53
- (Sweden) Kim Jansson 6.46
- (England) Danny Bird 5.93
- (Poland) Krzysztof Słaboń 5.93
- (England) Paul Hurry 5.91
- (Sweden) Daniel Nermark 5.60
- (England) Danny King 5.47
- (England) Leigh Lanham 4.83
- (Denmark) Tom P. Madsen 4.70
- (Sweden) Freddie Eriksson 4.07
- (Australia) Craig Boyce 4.00

Oxford

- (Denmark) Nicki Pedersen 9.33
- (United States) Greg Hancock 9.28
- (Australia) Todd Wiltshire 8.64
- (Denmark) Charlie Gjedde 7.82
- (Poland) Sebastian Ułamek 7.81
- (Denmark) Jan Stæchmann 6.52
- (England) Andy Smith 6.43
- (Australia) Travis McGowan 6.37
- (Australia) Craig Boyce 6.30
- (Sweden) Niklas Klingberg 5.57
- (Denmark) Niels Kristian Iversen 4.84
- (Slovenia) Matej Ferjan 4.77
- (Finland) Kai Laukkanen 4.46
- (Slovenia) Jernej Kolenko 2.72

Peterborough

- (Australia) Ryan Sullivan 9.23
- (Poland) Piotr Protasiewicz 8.76
- (England) Chris Harris 7.28
- (Denmark) Hans N. Andersen 7.22
- (Denmark) Kenneth Bjerre 6.97
- (England) Gary Havelock 6.93
- (Australia) Shane Parker 6.23
- (Australia) Nigel Sadler 5.86

Poole

- (Australia) Leigh Adams 10.14
- (Sweden) Magnus Zetterström 10.07
- (Sweden) Tony Rickardsson 9.64
- (Czech Republic) Lukáš Dryml 8.52
- (Australia) Craig Boyce 7.66
- (Sweden) Antonio Lindback 7.20
- (Denmark) Bjarne Pedersen 7.06
- (Sweden) David Ruud 6.48
- (Australia) Davey Watt 6.10
- (England) Andre Compton 5.83
- (Poland) Krzysztof Kasprzak 4.55
- (Australia) Tony Primmer 4.33

Wolverhampton

- (Sweden) Mikael Karlsson 9.28
- (Sweden) Peter Karlsson 9.10
- (England) Graham Jones 7.45
- (England) David Howe 7.40
- (England) Simon Stead 7.02
- (United States) Sam Ermolenko 7.01
- (Poland) Adam Skórnicki 6.57
- (Sweden) Magnus Karlsson 6.00
- (Scotland) James Grieves 5.80
- (England) Oliver Allen 5.67
- (England) Chris Neath 4.88
- (England) Rob Finlow 2.95

== See also ==
- Speedway in the United Kingdom
- List of United Kingdom Speedway League Champions
- Knockout Cup (speedway)
