= Ben Powell =

Australian speedway rider

- Born: 28 November 1984 (age 41); Helensvale, Queensland, Australia
- Nationality: Australian

Career history
- 2002: Sheffield
- 2003–2004: Carmarthen
- 2004–2005: Boston
- 2004–2005: Coventry
- 2005–2006: Rye House
- 2006: Mildenhall
- 2007: Birmingham
- 2008: Newcastle
- 2008: Scunthorpe

Benjamin Richard Powell (born 28 November 1984 in Helensvale, Queensland) is a former Australian motorcycle speedway rider.

== Career ==
=== Club ===
Powell signed for Sheffield Tigers's Conference League side, Sheffield Prowlers in 2002. He then spent two seasons with Carmarthen Dragons before they folded and he moved to Rye House where he rode for Rye House Raiders in the Conference League with the number one race jacket. He was also given several outings in the Rye House Rockets Premier League side in 2006. His performances improved and he was signed by Birmingham Brummies for his first full Premier League season. He averaged close to six points a meeting with the Brummies in 2007.

Another move, this time to Newcastle Diamonds in 2008, didn't work out and Scunthorpe Scorpions signed Powell at the beginning of June 2008. He was sacked by Scunthorpe after he launched his motorcycle at Newcastle rider Kenni Larsen during a meeting at his former club in October. Powell announced he was retiring from British speedway after he was later banned for 12 months by the Speedway Control Bureau.

=== International ===
Powell previously represented New Zealand in the World Long Track Championship and World Under-21 Championship.
