= Carmarthen Dragons =

Motorcycle speedway team

Club information
- Track address: United Counties Showground; Nantyci; Carmarthen
- Country: Wales
- Founded: 2002
- Closed: 2019

Club facts
- Colours: Red, green and white
- Track size: 242 metres
- Track record time: 56.83 secs
- Track record date: 6 April 2003
- Track record holder: Ritchie Hawkins

Carmarthen Dragons were a British motorcycle speedway team who operated at the United Counties Showground in Nantyci, Carmarthen, Wales, between 2002 and 2005 and later the Loomer Road Stadium, between 2017 and 2019.

== History ==
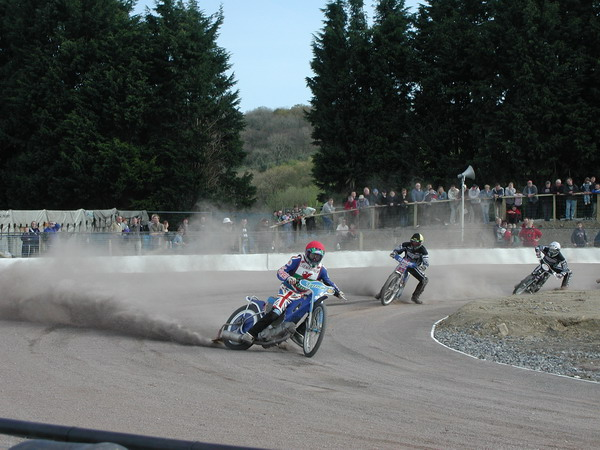
The Dragons in action at the Showground on 21 April 2002

The team was founded by Nigel Meakins and entered the Conference League (third division) During their inaugural 2002 Speedway Conference League season the Dragons finished in 7th place. They competed in the 2003 Speedway Conference League and 2004 Speedway Conference League finishing in 11th and 12th respectively. In 2005, the team disbanded but the venue remained open for training during the season.

The team returned to compete in the Midland Development League from 2017 to 2018 and the Midland & Southern Development League during 2019, at the Loomer Road Stadium.

== Notable riders ==
- Steve Bishop
- Shane Colvin
- Dean Felton
- Ben Powell
- Ben Wilson

== Season summary ==
Year and league	Position	Notes
2002 Speedway Conference League	7th	
2003 Speedway Conference League	11th	
2004 Speedway Conference League	12th	
2017 Midland Development League	5th	
2018 Midland Development League	4th	
2019 Midland & Southern Development League	5th	

== Conference League summary ==
Extended content

2002 team

The Dragons made their debut in 2002, winning their first meeting 46-43 at local rivals Newport Mavericks. The first home meeting at the Carmarthen Showground saw a 53-35 win against King's Lynn Kids with a crowd of 1,000 in attendance. The season saw 9 wins and 10 defeats finishing 7th out of 11. The Dragons fared better in the Conference Trophy, winning 7 and losing 3 to finish 2nd in the group to Mildenhall Fen Tigers. Star performer was Shane Colvin who completed six full maximums with an average of 10.23.

2003 team

The second season saw crowds decline which led to financial problems for the Dragons. On the track, without Colvin, the Dragons struggled and finished 11th out of 13 in the league, bottom of the Conference Trophy and knocked out of the KO Cup by Rye House Raiders. Matthew Cross finished top of the averages for the club with 8.15, although Ben Powell joined midway through the season to finish the season on a 7.34 average.

2004 team

The Dragons remained in the Conference League but Nigel Meakins failed to secure a major sponsor. On the track, Carmarthen again struggled and finished 12th of 13 in the league and were beaten in the KO Cup by Mildenhall. Steve Bishop averaged 9.27 over the season and Ben Wilson rode for the Dragons in away matches near his northern base and averaged 8.80, although Ben Powell struggled, primarily due to bike problems and Shane Colvin's return only resulted in an average of 6.40.

== See also ==
- List of defunct motorcycle speedway teams in the United Kingdom
