= David Gagen =

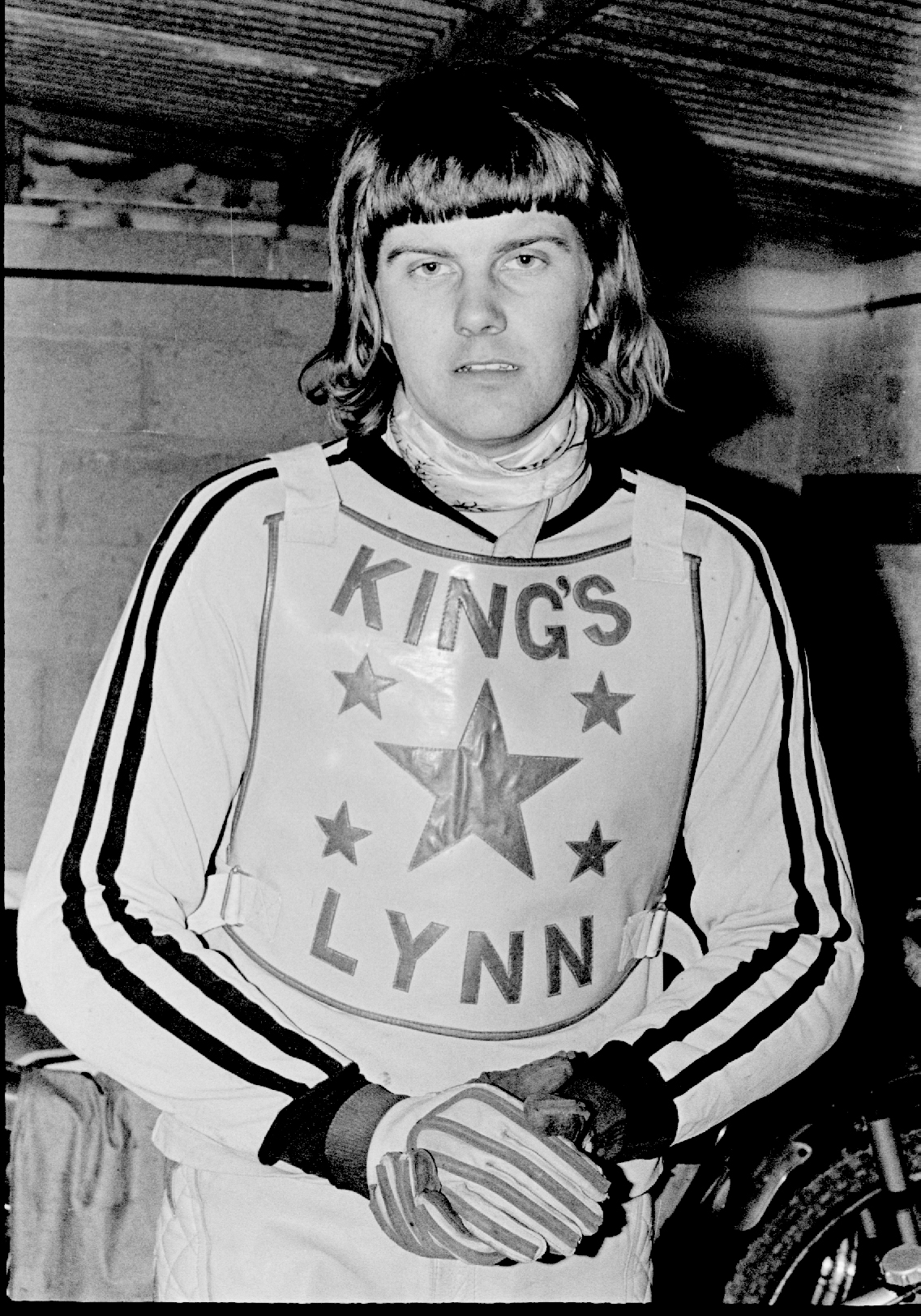
- Born: 11 August 1953 (age 73); King's Lynn, Norfolk
- Nationality: British (English)

Career history
- 1972–1979, 1981: Kings Lynn Stars
- 1973–1975, 1979–1984: Boston Barracudas
- 1980, 1982–1983: Coventry Bees

Individual honours
- 1977: British Championship finalist
- 1980: Warners Grand National

Team honours
- 1977: British League KO Cup Winner
- 1973: British League Division Two Champion
- 1973: British League Div Two KO Cup Winner
- 1978: Inter League Knockout Cup

David Peter Gagen (born 11 August 1953) is a former speedway rider from England.

== Speedway career ==
Gagen rode in the top tier of British Speedway from 1972 to 1983, riding for various clubs. He reached the final of the British Speedway Championship in 1977.

In 1977, Gagan competed in the British Speedway Championship final.

In 1982, Gagan earned a testimonial meeting for Boston Barracudas, where he had also become the club captain. He retired after the 1984 season.
