= Boston Barracudas =

British speedway team

Club information
- Track address: Boston Sports Stadium (1970–1987); King's Lynn Stadium (2000–2008)
- Country: England
- Founded: 1970
- Closed: 2008

Club facts
- Colours: Blue and White
- Track size: 342 metres

Major team honours
BL Div. 2	1973
BL Div. 2 KO Cup	1973
NL Pairs	1977
Conference League KO Cup	2000
Conference League Pairs	2007, 2008

The Boston Barracudas were a speedway team that competed from 1970 to 1987 and again from 2000 to 2008. the team were based at Boston Sports Stadium in New Hammond Beck Road, Boston, Lincolnshire.

== History ==
=== Origins and 1970s ===
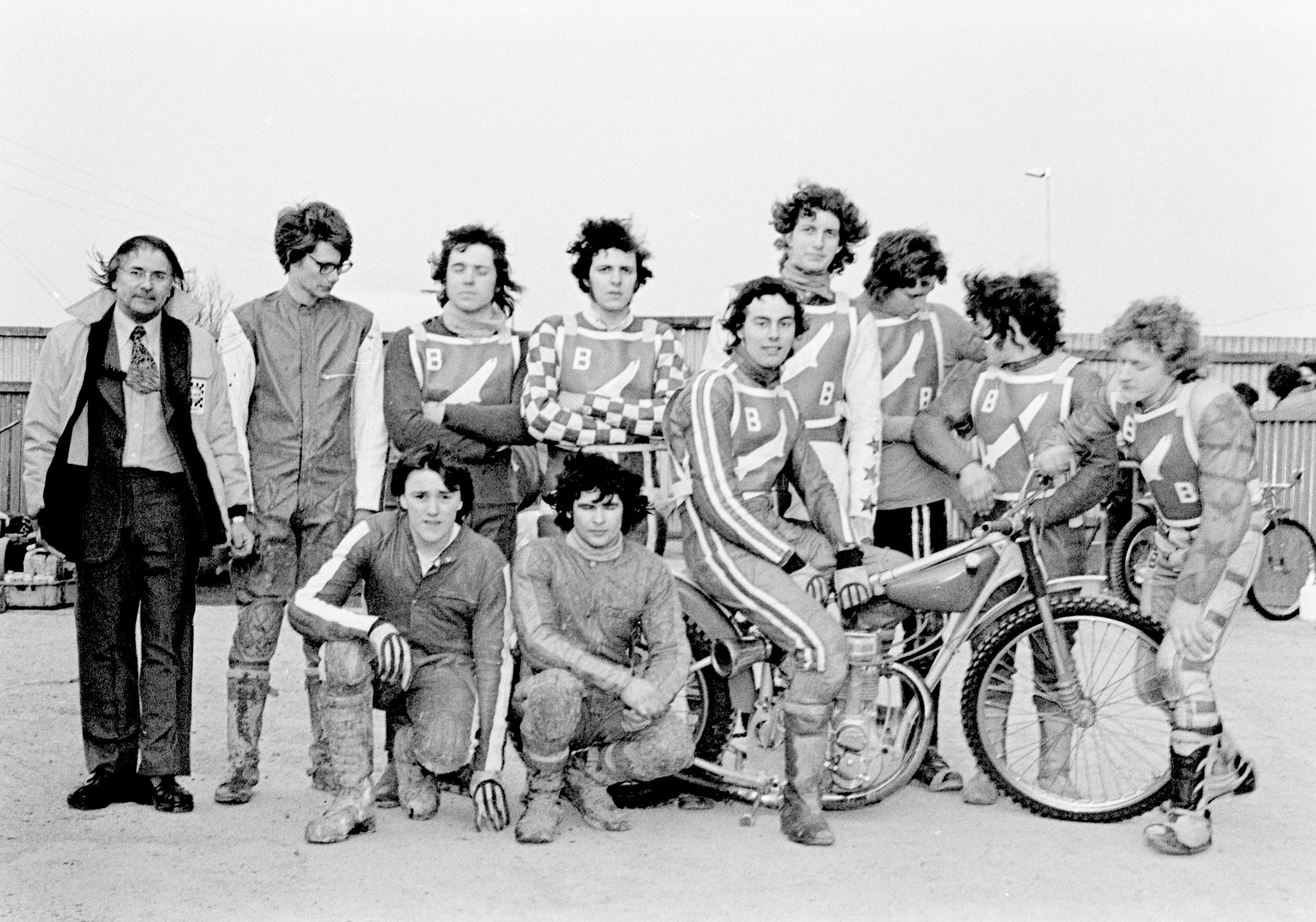
The 1976 team

The Boston Barracudas were founded mid-season in 1970 by promoters Cyril Crane and Gordon Perkins. Planning permission was received to construct a track at the Boston Sports Stadium and the promoters bought the second tier team known as the King's Lynn Starlets from Maurice Littlechild. The Barracudas first home fixture was an inter-counties cup match against Peterborough Panthers on 16 August. The team fulfilled the remaining King's Lynn fixtures and finished the season in 13th place.

The team continued to compete in the second division and during the 1973 British League Division Two season completed the league and cup double by finishing 1st in the league table and winning the Knockout Cup. The team led by Arthur Price was backed up by Carl Glover, who had improved his average significantly to 9.62 and six other riders who posted averages from 8.42 to 6.88.

The remainder of the decade was less successful and from 1975 they competed in the National League (the new name for division 2). Also in 1975, the Barracudas signed 16-year-old Michael Lee on loan from King's Lynn. Lee would be a world champion just 5 years later. With no Price, Glover or Lee, the team could only record a best finish of 7th in 1977.

=== 1980s ===
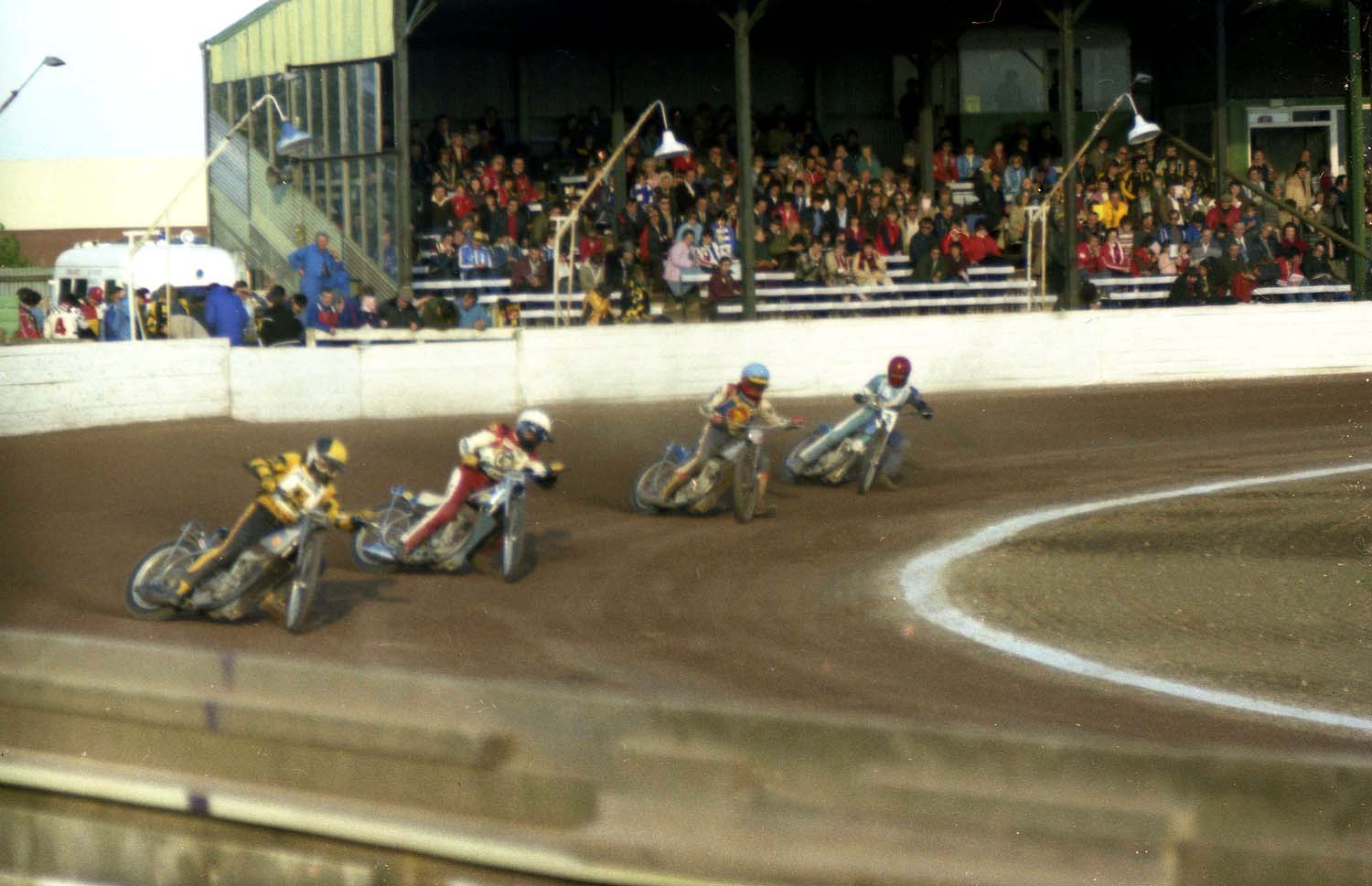
Boston vs Ellesmere Port on 31 May 1981

With riders such as David Gagen and Rob Hollingworth, Boston were consistent but were unable to challenge for honours. In late 1984 promoter Cyril Crane was unhappy over new rules and wanted to sell his promotion rights. Despite signing riders for 1985, the club withdrew from the league just days before the start of the season, when Crane relinquished his interests.

The team soon returned for the 1986 season, under a new promotion team of Richard Green, David Cox and Glen Norton. However, after just one season the team entered 1987 and suffered heavy defeats and financial issues. This resulted in the Barracudas withdrawing mid-season with the last fixture being a heavy home defeat to Eastbourne on 1 August 1987, the Barracudas results were expunged.

=== 2000s ===
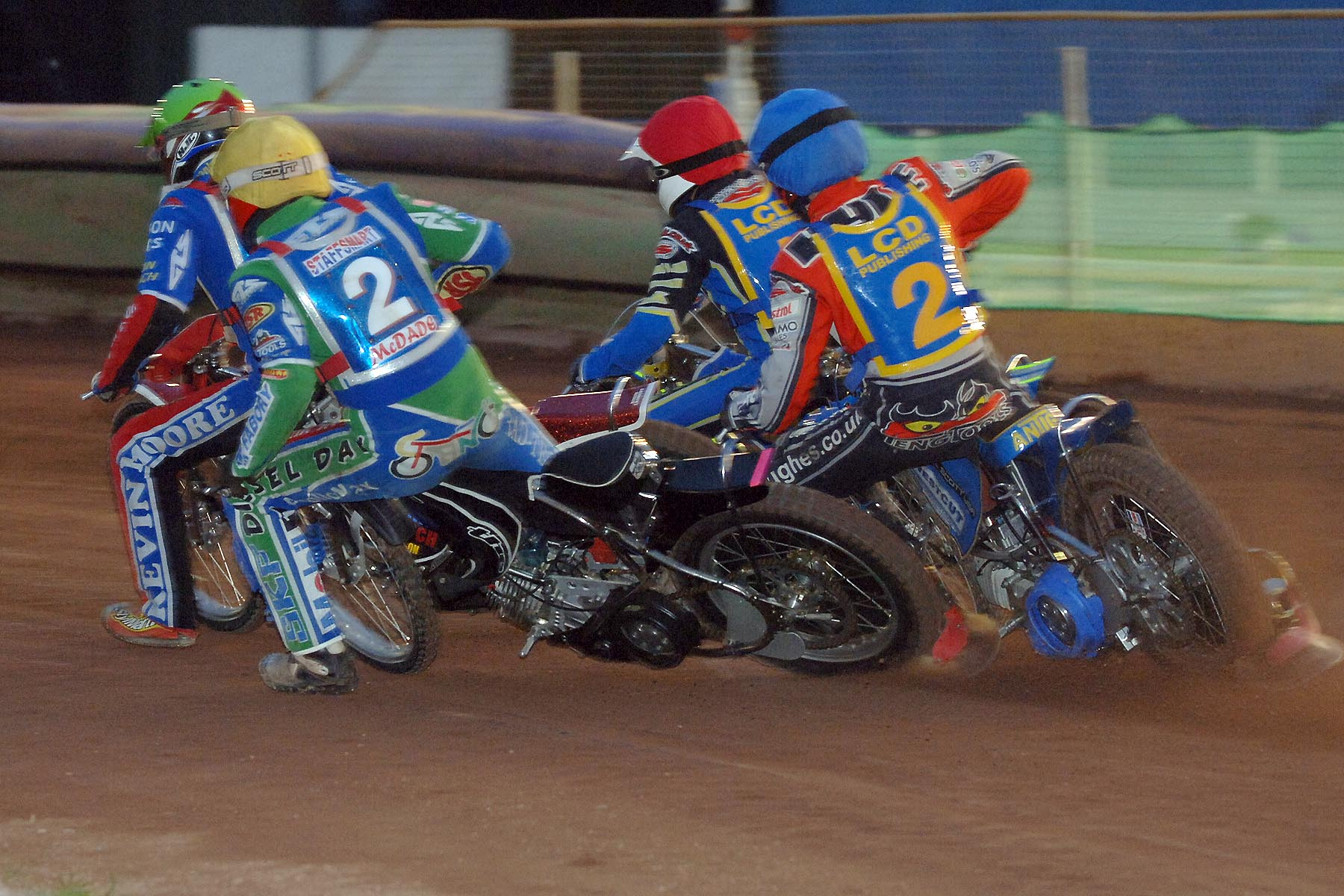
Boston against Oxford in 2007

In 2000 the club was reformed and entered the third tier Conference League but riding at King's Lynn Stadium because the Boston Sports Stadium had closed in 1987. During the 2000 Speedway Conference League the team finished 4th and won the Conference League Knockout Cup defeating Rye House Rockets in the final.

The team won the 2003 Conference Trophy riding as the Boston Barracuda-Braves and competed up to the end of the 2008 Speedway Conference League season. The last honours for the club were two consecutive Pairs Championship wins in 2007, won by Paul Cooper and Simon Lambert and 2008, when won by James Cockle and Lambert.

== Season summary ==
Extended content

Year and league	Position	Notes
1970 British League Division Two season	13th	
1971 British League Division Two season	4th	
1972 British League Division Two season	2nd	
1973 British League Division Two season	1st	Champions & Knockout Cup winners
1974 British League Division Two season	3rd	
1975 New National League season	5th	
1976 National League season	12th	
1977 National League season	7th	
1978 National League season	17th	
1979 National League season	16th	
1980 National League season	6th	
1981 National League season	6th	
1982 National League season	8th	
1983 National League season	16th	
1984 National League season	6th	
1986 National League season	12th	
1987 National League season	N/A	withdrew, results expunged
2000 Speedway Conference League	4th	Knockout Cup winners
2001 Speedway Conference League	3rd	
2002 Speedway Conference League	6th	
2003 Speedway Conference League	4th	rode as Barracuda-Braves
2004 Speedway Conference League	5th	rode as Barracuda-Braves
2005 Speedway Conference League	9th	rode as Barracuda-Braves
2006 Speedway Conference League	5th	rode as Barracuda-Braves
2007 Speedway Conference League	4th	Pairs winners
2008 Speedway Conference League	2nd	rode as Barracuda-Braves, pairs winners

== Notable riders ==
- (England) James Cockle
- (England) Paul Cooper
- (England) David Gagen
- (England) Carl Glover
- (England) Rob Hollingworth
- (England) Simon Lambert
- (England) Michael Lee
- (England) Arthur Price

== See also ==
- Category:Boston Barracudas riders
- List of United Kingdom Speedway League Champions
- Knockout Cup (speedway)
