= John Harrhy =

British motorcycle speedway rider

- Born: 1 September 1942 (age 84); Brandon, Warwickshire, England
- Nationality: British (English)

Career history
- 1969–1970: Ipswich Witches
- 1969–1976: Coventry Bees
- 1972: Peterborough Panthers
- 1978: Stoke Potters

Team honours
- 1970: Knockout Cup (tier 2)
- 1971, 1976: Midland Cup

John Michael Harrhy (born 1 September 1942) is a former motorcycle speedway rider from England.

== Biography ==
Harrhy, born in Brandon, Warwickshire, began his British leagues career riding for Coventry Bees as a junior in 1968. The following season, he broke into the first team but spent most of the season loaned out to Ipswich Witches during the 1969 British League Division Two season. He made an immediate impact in Suffolk, topping the team's averages in his rookie season.

Harrhy enjoyed an even better season in 1970, helping Ipswich win the Knockout Cup (tier 2) and recording a 9.21 season average.

Harrhy returned to the Coventry team in 1972, rising to third in the team averages and would remain with the Bees until the end of the 1976 season. Several issues during the 1976 season resulted in Harrhy stating that he was going to retire but he continued to the end of the season before missing the 1977 campaign.

Haarhy returned to speedway for the 1978 National League season with Stoke Potters.

== Retirement ==
After speedway, Harrhy bought Windmill Farm in 1979 and turned it into a hotel and golf venue. He later sold the Windmill Village Hotel and Golf Club for £7 million to businessman Roy Richards, who also owned the National Motorcycle Museum (UK).
