= Graham Banks =

British speedway rider

- Born: 15 January 1949; Folkestone, England
- Died: 4 June 1978 (aged 29); Hopes Farm, New Romney, Kent
- Nationality: British (English)

Career history
- 1969–1978: Canterbury Crusaders
- 1975: Wimbledon Dons

Team honours
- 1970, 1978: League champion (tier 2)

Graham William Banks (15 January 1949 – 4 June 1978) was an English motorcycle speedway rider.

== Biography ==
Banks, born in Folkestone, grew up in a speedway family, with his father Monty Banks being a well known grasstrack rider. He began his own grasstrack career in 1969, the same season that he made his conventional speedway British leagues debut, riding for Canterbury Crusaders during the 1969 British League Division Two season season.

The following season in 1970, Banks became a first team regular, recording 7.53 for the season and was instrumental in helping the Crusaders win the league title.

Banks was a heat leader for the 1971 season and averaged 8.03, but after two more full seasons, he requested a transfer stating that he had become stale at the club. Banks finally decided to miss the 1974 season and concentrate on grasstrack instead.

Banks returned to speedway for the 1975 British League season after signing for Wimbledon Dons but struggled to make an impact and enjoyed a better season on the grasstrack.

In 1976, Banks returned to Canterbury and topped the team's averages during that season. He continued to ride well for the Crusaders in 1977 and the start of 1978, averaging over 8 for both seasons. On 4 June 1978, he was killed in a grasstrack racing accident at Scott's Marsh Farm, on New Romney grass track, marring the Crusaders' 1978 league winning season.

== Family ==
His brother to Trevor Banks also rode speedway, primarily grasstrack and longtrack.

== See also ==
- Rider deaths in motorcycle speedway
