= Gary Peterson (speedway rider) =

New Zealand speedway rider (1946–1975)

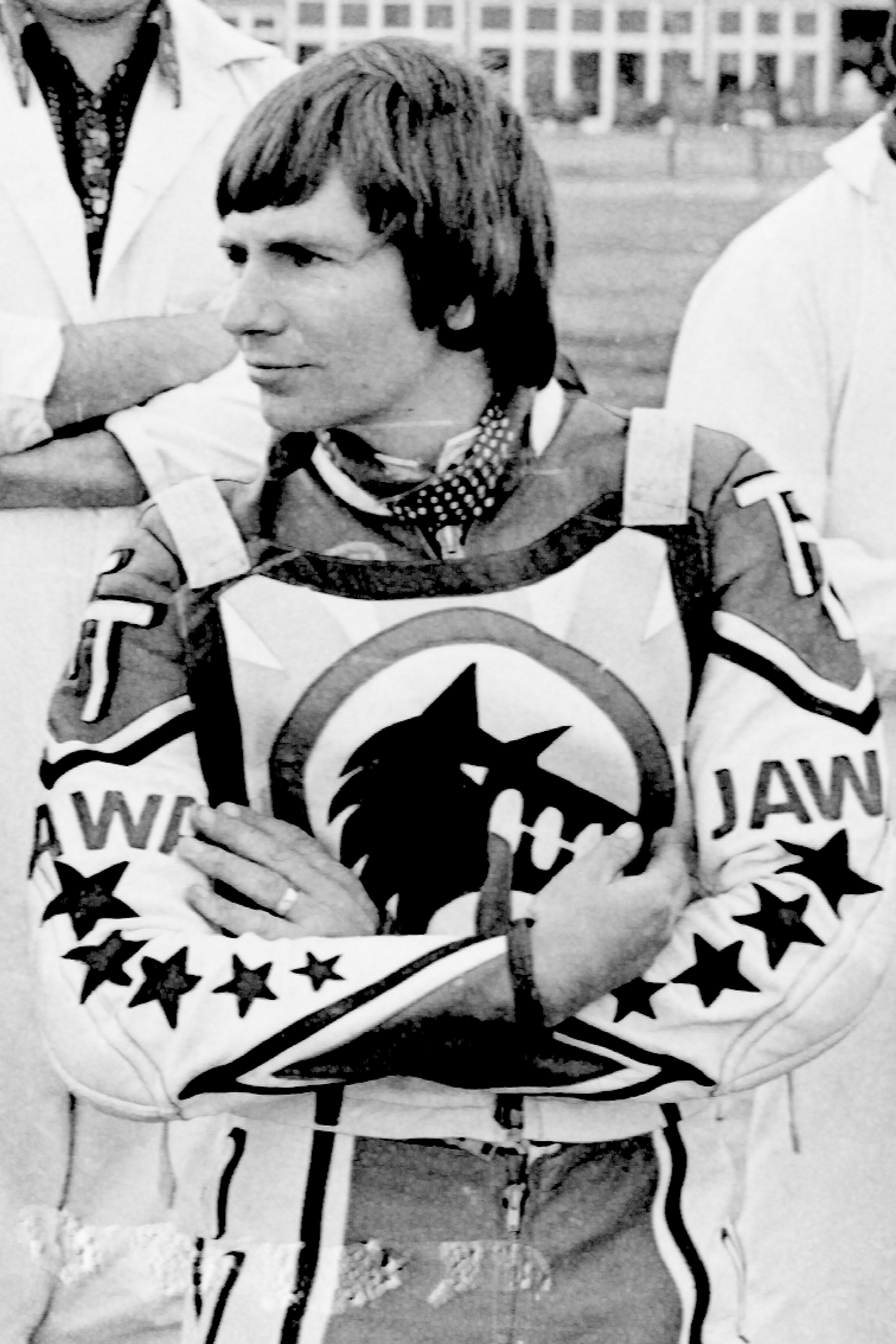
- Born: 9 June 1946; New Zealand
- Died: 17 October 1975 (aged 29); Wolverhampton, England
- Nationality: New Zealander

Career history
- 1968–1970: Nelson Admirals
- 1968–1969: Newcastle Diamonds
- 1970–1971, 1973, 1975: Wolverhampton Wolves
- 1970: Bradford Northern

Individual honours
- 1973: New Zealand Champion

Team honours
- 1973: Midland Cup

Gary Richard Peterson (9 June 1946 – 17 October 1975) was a New Zealand international motorcycle speedway rider. He earned 21 caps for the New Zealand national speedway team.

== Speedway career ==
Peterson became the champion of New Zealand after winning the 1973 New Zealand Championship.

Peterson rode in the top two tiers of British Speedway from 1968 to 1975, riding for Nelson Admirals, Newcastle Diamonds, Wolverhampton Wolves and Bradford Northern.

In 1970, Peterson topped the league averages during the 1970 British League Division Two season. Peterson missed the 1974 season for Wolves due to having to return home to New Zealand because of his mother's illness.

In 1975, Peterson died in a crash at Monmore Green Stadium during the Midland Cup final match. Riding for Wolves, he lost control of his bike and hit a track lighting pylon.

== See also ==
- Rider deaths in motorcycle speedway
