= Barry Crowson =

British speedway rider

- Born: 20 April 1947; Tufnell Park, London, England
- Nationality: British (English)

Career history
- 1967–1970: West Ham Hammers
- 1968, 1970: Canterbury Crusaders
- 1969: Eastbourne Eagles
- 1971–1974: King's Lynn Stars
- 1975–1976: Wimbledon Dons

Team honours
- 1970: League champion (tier 2)
- 1968: Knockout Cup (tier 2)
- 1973: Spring Gold Cup Winner
- 1975: London Cup Winner

Barry Michael Crowson (born 20 April 1947) is a former motorcycle speedway rider from England.

== Biography ==
Crowson, born in Tufnell Park, London, began his British leagues career riding for West Ham Hammers during the 1967 British League season season.

Crowson rode for the London Club for four years from 1967 to 1970 but enjoyed more success on loan at Canterbury Crusaders, captaining the club and winning the Knockout Cup with them, during the 1968 British League Division Two season.

During the 1968 Rider's Championship, held at Hackney Wick Stadium on 27 September, several riders were involved in a crash, which resulted in Chris Bailey (broken wrist) and Crowson (suspected fractured thigh bone) going to hospital. However, Crowson after receiving an all-clear rode for his parent club West Ham the following evening.

In 1969, Crowson joined Eastbourne Eagles on loan from West Ham and topped the team's averages that season. He returned to Canterbury in 1970 and helped the Crusaders win the league title. He also finished runner-up to Dave Jessup in the Rider's Championship, held at Hackney Wick Stadium on 25 September and averaged an impressive 9.17.

In 1971, Crowson secured a full transfer from West Ham to King's Lynn Stars and spent four seasons from 1971 to 1974 riding in the British League for them. He continued to compete in the British League when he joined Wimbledon Dons for the 1975 British League season. He was a member of the Dons team that won the 1975 London Cup.
