= Ted Hubbard =

English motorcycle racer (born 1949)

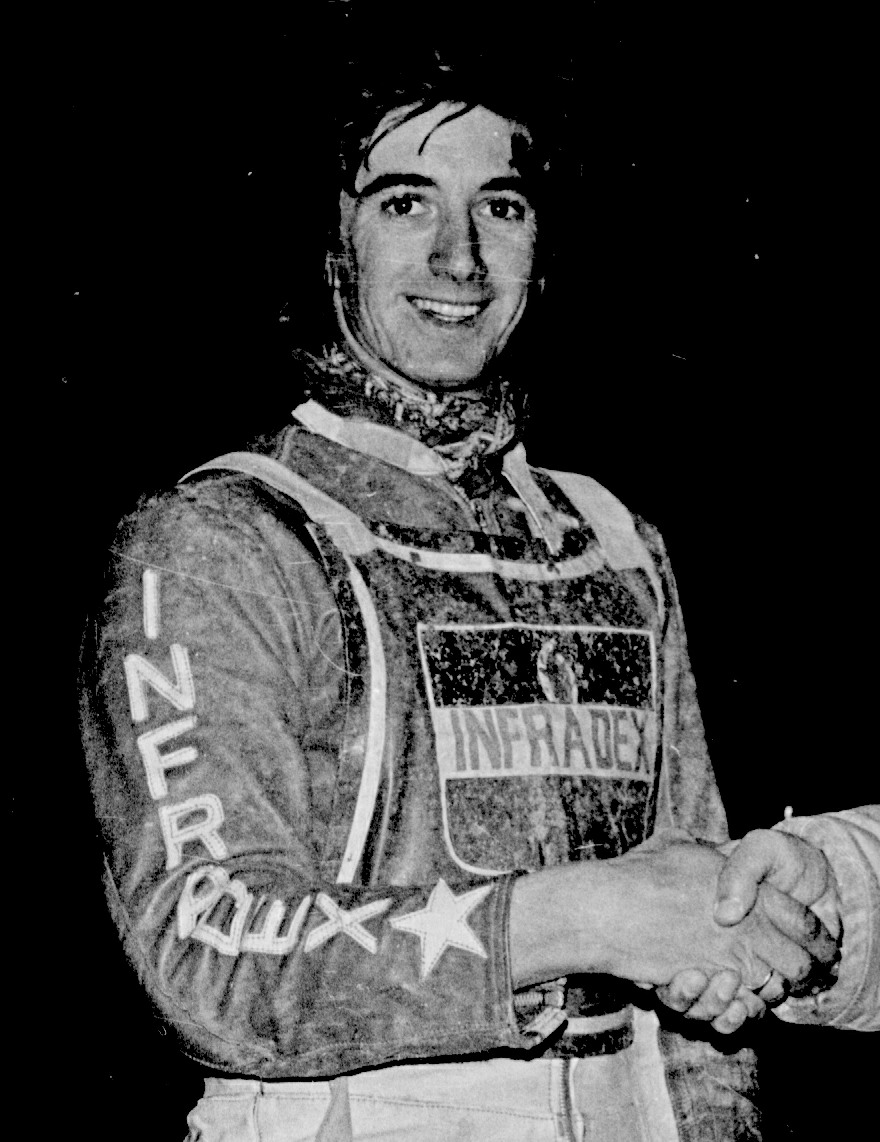
- Born: 20 June 1949; Lydden, England
- Died: 19 October 2019 (aged 70)
- Nationality: British (English)

Career history
- 1970: Berwick Bandits
- 1970–1974, 1980: Canterbury Crusaders
- 1972: Oxford Rebels
- 1974–1980, 1981: Hackney Hawks
- 1976–1979: Rye House Rockets
- 1980: Eastbourne Eagles

Team honours
- 1970: British League Division Two
- 1979: National League KO Cup Winner

Edward Raymond Hubbard (20 June 1949 – 19 October 2019), nicknamed "Hurricane Hubbard", was a motorcycle speedway rider in the National League and the British League.

Hubbard was born in Lydden, England.

== Career ==
Hubbard was a popular sportsman who rode chiefly for the Canterbury Crusaders and the Rye House Rockets with loans out to other clubs, most notably the Hackney Hawks.

Hubbard was part of the Canterbury Crusaders team that won the league title during the 1970 British League Division Two season.

Hubbard made two appearances at the British League Division Two Riders Championship, finishing in the top three both times. In the 1974 Championship, he only lost the title after a run-off, when he finished on 13 points with Carl Glover. In the 1976 Championship, he finished third behind Joe Owen.

Hubbard left Rye House in 1979 as doubling up rides with Hackney was too demanding, seeing as he was also involved in the family business. Tempted back to racing by the Canterbury Crusaders in 1980, he once again thought of full retirement at the end of the season, but his old promoter, Len Silver, persuaded him to ride for Hackney for one more season. However, the conflict with his business and the risk of injury that might damage his livelihood brought him to finally hang up his leathers at the age of 32. He had a brief spell as team manager of the Iwade-based Sittingbourne Crusaders.

== After speedway ==
The family business in fruit and veg expanded to include wholesale potato supplies to fish-and-chip shops in Kent. He was married to Jeannette; they had three children—Jason, Stuart, and Nicola—and four grandchildren. They took on a 47-acre (19 ha) farm as a business-cum-hobby. He died of liver cancer, aged 70, in 2019.
