= Boston Sports Stadium =

Sports venue in Lincolnshire, England

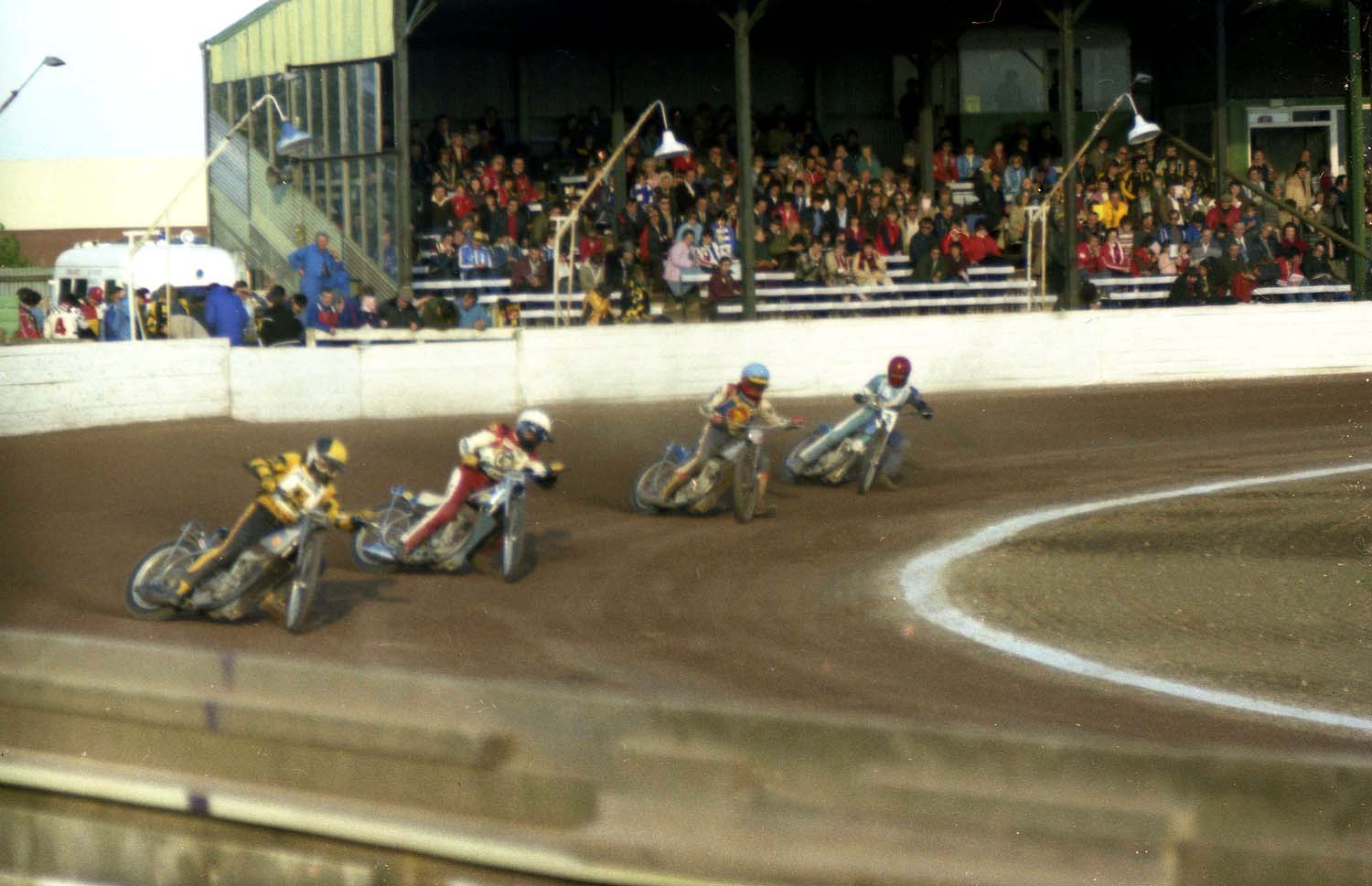
- Speedway at the stadium in 1981
- Interactive map of Boston Sports Stadium
- Location: New Hammond Beck Road, Wyberton, near Boston, Lincolnshire
- Coordinates: 52°58′15″N 0°03′52″W

Construction
- Opened: 1964
- Closed: 1987

The Boston Sports Stadium was a greyhound racing and speedway stadium on New Hammond Beck Road, Wyberton, near Boston, Lincolnshire.

== Origins ==
The stadium was constructed near Wyberton House in an area known as Wyberton Fen. To the south was the New Hammond Beck Road and on its north side was the South Forty-Foot Drain.

== Greyhound racing ==
Racing started on 1 June 1964 and was independent (not affiliated to the sports governing body the National Greyhound Racing Club). The circuit was described as a good galloping grass track with distances of 300 and 525 yards behind an inside Sumner hare system. Racing was held on Monday and Friday evenings at 7.30pm.

== Speedway ==
Speedway took place from 21 March 1971 until 1 August 1987.

== Closure ==
The greyhound track closed in 1983 followed by the speedway in 1987 before being demolished and making way for supermarkets.
