= Arthur Price (speedway rider) =

British motorcycle speedway rider (1946–2026)

- Born: 30 April 1946; Wolverhampton, England
- Died: August 2026 (aged 80)
- Nationality: British (English)

Career history
- 1968: Nelson Admirals
- 1968: Crayford Kestrels
- 1969–1978: King's Lynn Stars II/Boston Barracudas
- 1970–1973: King's Lynn Stars
- 1974–1978: Cradley United/Heathens
- 1978: Workington Comets
- 1979: Scunthorpe Stags
- 1980: Nottingham Outlaws
- 1981: Oxford Cheetahs

Individual honours
- 1973: Second Division Riders Champion

Team honours
- 1973: British League Division Two Champion
- 1973: British League Div Two KO Cup Winner
- 1973: Spring Gold Cup winner

Arthur Malcolm Price (30 April 1946 – August 2026) was an English motorcycle speedway rider. He won the Second Division Riders Championship in 1973 and made three appearances for the England national speedway team.

== Biography ==
Born in Wolverhampton, Price began his speedway career in 1968, signing for British League team Wolverhampton Wolves and making his competitive debut on loan to Division Two teams Crayford Kestrels and Nelson Admirals. In 1969, he moved on to King's Lynn Stars, moving up with the team into Division One of the British League in 1970, while continuing to ride in Division Two for Boston Barracudas. He was selected to represent Young England in 1971 against Czechoslovakia.

In 1972, Price finished runner-up (after a run-off) to Phil Crump, in the British League Division Two Riders Championship, after both riders finished on 12 points. He made up for the unlucky loss by winning the Rider's Championship, held at Wimbledon Stadium on 6 October 1973. Price was a popular rider with the fans and had his own female fan club.

The following season in 1973, Price won the League and Cup double with Boston. Price competed in the Second Division Riders final for four consecutive years between 1970 and 1973.

In 1974, Price transferred to Cradley United, scoring solidly at an average of 5.56 points in his first season for the club and improving to a league average of 8.00 in 1975.

This level of performance was not maintained in subsequent years, and in 1978, Price dropped down to the National League with Workington Comets, finishing the season as the team's highest-averaged rider on 8.63. After seasons with Scunthorpe Stags, Nottingham Outlaws, and Oxford Cheetahs, he retired in 1981.

Price represented the Division Two-level 'Young England' team between 1969 and 1973, and progressed to the full England team in 1974 in a match against the Soviet Union. He represented England again in 1975 against Poland. In all, he represented Young England in 28 matches and the full England team in three.

Price's death was announced on 9 August 2026. He was 80.
