= James Brundle =

British motorcycle speedway racer

- Born: 15 December 1986 (age 39); King's Lynn, England
- Nationality: British (English)

Career history
- 2002–2006: Mildenhall Fen Tigers
- 2007: Boston Barracudas
- 2002–2005, 2007: King's Lynn Stars
- 2008: Eastbourne Eagles

Team honours
- 2008: Elite League KO Cup
- 2007: Premier Trophy

James Michael Brundle (born 15 December 1986, in King's Lynn, England) is a former motorcycle speedway rider from England.

== Career ==
Brundle began his career with King's Lynn Stars in the Conference League in 2002. He moved up to the King's Lynn Premier League team in 2003.

In 2004, Brundle was involved in a serious car crash and sustained serious internal injuries. Despite the crash, Brundle returned to action during the same season.

Brundle spent a season on loan with Mildenhall Fen Tigers when they moved up to the Premier League in 2006. In 2007 he won the Premier Trophy with the King's Lynn Stars and in 2008 he won the Elite League KO Cup with Eastbourne Eagles.
