= SGB Championship 2024 =

Second tier of 2024 British speedway season

- League: SGB Championship
- No. of competitors: 9
- Champions: Poole Pirates
- Knockout Cup: Poole Pirates
- BSN Series: Poole Pirates
- Pairs: Redcar Bears
- Riders' Championship: Josh Pickering
- Highest average: Richard Lawson
- Division/s above: SGB Premiership
- Division/s below: 2024 NDL

The 2024 SGB Cab Direct Championship season was the 77th season of the second tier of British Speedway and the 7th known as the SGB Championship.

== Summary ==
Nine clubs competed in the Championship during 2024, with Workington replacing Birmingham following their respective league changes. Edinburgh once again remained in the league despite problems surrounding their home venue.

The league format was the same as in 2023, with each team racing against each other twice (home and away), meaning a total of 16 fixtures each during the season. The Cab Direct Knockout Cup and the BSN Series also both returned for 2024, both following the same formats as in 2023.

Locations of the 2024 SGB Championship teams

The top four teams qualified for the playoffs. The points limit for team construction was reduced from 40 to 38 points. Glasgow defended the Championship title that they won in 2023, while Scunthorpe defended the knockout cup and Poole defended the BSN Series.

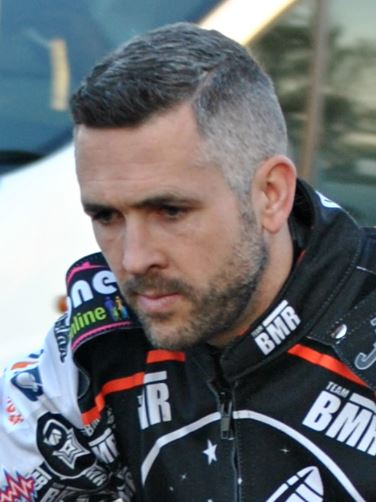
Scott Nicholls captains the Oxford Cheetahs

Poole Pirates won the league title for the third time in four years, defeating Oxford Cheetahs in the play off final and overturning a first leg deficit of 12 points. The second leg was subject to controversy following the exclusion and subsequent retirement of Luke Killeen, which effectively ended Oxford's title hopes. Oxford manager Peter Schroeck cited weak refereeing by Michael Breckon. However, Poole rider Tom Brennan starred in the second leg win with 13 points.

The same two teams met in the Knockout Cup final, which resulted in an anti-climax as Poole won easily and consisted of a second leg that saw Oxford field just two riders due to injuries and having to call on five guest riders (believed to be a record).

== League ==
=== Regular season ===
==== League table ====
Pos.	Club	M	Home			Away			F	A	B	Pts	+/−
Pos.	Club	M	W	SHL	L	W	SHL	L	F	A	B	Pts	+/−
1	Poole Pirates **(C)**	16	7	0	1	6	1	1	790	650	7	34	+140
2	Oxford Cheetahs	16	8	0	0	2	2	4	784	654	8	30	+130
3	Scunthorpe Scorpions	16	8	0	0	2	0	6	752	684	5	25	+68
4	Workington Comets	16	7	0	1	2	0	6	709	731	4	22	-22
5	Glasgow Tigers	16	7	0	1	1	0	7	703	734	4	20	-31
6	Redcar Bears	16	5	0	3	2	0	6	707	733	4	18	-26
7	Edinburgh Monarchs	16	5	0	3	0	0	8	688	749	2	12	-61
8	Plymouth Gladiators	16	4	0	4	1	0	7	674	761	2	12	-87
9	Berwick Bandits	16	4	0	4	1	0	7	663	575	1	11	-112

==== Fixtures & results ====
Home \ Away	BER	EDI	GLA	OXF	PLY	POL	RED	SCU	WOR
Berwick		47–43	43–47	45–45	47–42	44–46	47–43	44–46	41–49
Edinburgh	51–39		49–41	46–44	42–48	43–47	44–46	56–34	55–35
Glasgow	48–41	50–40		46–44	58–32	44–46	48–42	48–41	47–43
Oxford	53–37	54–36	55–35		51–39	45–45	53–36	55–34	57–33
Plymouth	53–37	54–34	49–40	43–47		41–49	43–47	46–43	43–47
Poole	52–38	50–40	55–35	41–49	55–35		47–43	52–38	61–29
Redcar	43–47	49–41	50–40	45–45	48–42	41–49		44–46	50–40
Scunthorpe	62–28	50–39	55–35	47–43	62–28	48–42	53–37		54–36
Workington	52–38	61–29	49–41	46–44	54–36	37–53	47–43	51–39	

Legend: Blue = home team win; Yellow = draw; Red = away team win.

=== Play Offs ===
**Semi Finals**
1	**Poole Pirates**	**52**	53	105
4	Workington Comets	38	**36**	74
3	Scunthorpe Scorpions	**44**	41	85
2	**Oxford Cheetahs**	46	**49**	95

**Grand Final**
**Poole Pirates**	39	**56**	95
Oxford Cheetahs	**51**	34	85

Home team scores are in bold
Overall aggregate scores are in red

=== Grand Final ===
First Leg

5 October

Oxford Cheetahs; Sam Masters 12; Luke Killeen 12; Scott Nicholls 10; Dan Gilkes (guest) 8 Cameron Heeps 6 Jody Scott 2 Ashton Boughen 1	51–39	Poole Pirates; Zach Cook 9 Richard Lawson 8 Ben Cook 7 Vinnie Foord 5 Tom Brennan 4 Tobias Thomsen 4 Sam Hagon 2	Oxford Stadium; Referee(s): Chris Durno

Second Leg

9 October

Poole Pirates; Tom Brennan 13; Tobias Thomsen 10; Richard Lawson 10; Ben Cook 9 Zach Cook 8 Vinnie Foord 3 Sam Hagon 3	56–34	Oxford Cheetahs; Sam Masters 10; Dan Gilkes 6 Scott Nicholls 6 Cameron Heeps 6 Ashton Boughen 4 Jody Scott 2 Luke Killeen 0	Poole Stadium; Referee(s): Michael Breckon

== Knockout Cup ==
The 2024 SGB Championship Knockout Cup is the 56th edition of the Knockout Cup for tier two teams and the 7th edition under the SGB Championship Knockout Cup name.

**Round One**
**Scunthorpe Scorpions**	**61**	39	100
Plymouth Gladiators	29	**51**	80

**Quarter Finals**
Berwick Bandits	**54**	27	81
**Scunthorpe Scorpions**	36	**63**	99
**Poole Pirates**	**49**	43	92
Edinburgh Monarchs	40	**47**	87
**Redcar Bears**	**51**	50	101
Workington Comets	38	**40**	78
Glasgow Tigers	**51**	36	87
**Oxford Cheetahs**	39	**54**	93

**Semi Finals**
Scunthorpe Scorpions	29	**40**	69
**Poole Pirates**	**60**	50	110
Redcar Bears	40	**45**	85
**Oxford Cheetahs**	**50**	45	95

**Final**
**Poole Pirates**	57	**57**	114
Oxford Cheetahs	**33**	33	66

Home team scores are in bold
Overall aggregate scores are in red

=== Final ===
First Leg

17 October

Oxford Cheetahs; Cameron Heeps 11; Sam Masters 8 Dan Gilkes (guest) 6 Jack Smith (guest) 5 Ashton Boughen 2 Connor Coles (guest) 1 Scott Nicholls 0	33–57	Poole Pirates; Richard Lawson 14; Tom Brennan 11; Tobias Thomsen 11; Zach Cook 7 Ben Cook 7 Vinnie Foord 6 Sam Hagon 1	Oxford Stadium; Referee(s): Mick Bates

Second Leg

23 October

Poole Pirates; Ben Cook 13; Richard Lawson 12; Tobias Thomsen 8 Tom Brennan 8 Vinnie Foord 6 Zach Cook 5 Sam Hagon 5	57–33	Oxford Cheetahs; Sam Masters 11; Jason Edwards (guest) 8 Dan Gilkes (guest) 4 Ben Trigger (guest) 4 Simon Lambert (guest) 3 Ashton Boughen 3 Connor Coles (guest) 0	Poole Stadium; Referee(s): Chris Gay

== BSN Series ==
Scottish Group

Fixtures

Home \ Away	BER	EDB	GLA
Berwick		47–43	48–42
Edinburgh	53–37		50–39
Glasgow	50–40	45–45	

Updated to match(es) played on unknown. Source:
Legend: Blue = home team win; Yellow = draw; Red = away team win.

Table

Pos.	Club	M	Home			Away			F	A	B	Pts	+/−
Pos.	Club	M	W	SHL	L	W	SHL	L	F	A	B	Pts	+/−
1	Edinburgh Monarchs **(Q)**	4	2	0	0	1	0	1	191	168	2	**8**	+23
2	Glasgow Tigers	4	1	1	0	0	0	2	176	183	1	**4**	-7
3	Berwick Bandits	4	2	0	0	0	0	2	172	188	0	**4**	-16

Northern Group

Fixtures

Home \ Away	RED	SCU	WOR
Redcar		42–48	44–46
Scunthorpe	52–38		49–41
Workington	49–41	56–34	

Updated to match(es) played on unknown. Source:
Legend: Blue = home team win; Yellow = draw; Red = away team win.

Table

Pos.	Club	M	Home			Away			F	A	B	Pts	+/−
Pos.	Club	M	W	SHL	L	W	SHL	L	F	A	B	Pts	+/−
1	Workington Comets **(Q)**	4	2	0	0	1	0	1	192	168	2	**8**	+24
2	Scunthorpe Scorpions **(Q)**	4	2	0	0	1	0	1	183	177	1	**7**	+6
3	Redcar Bears	4	0	0	2	0	0	2	165	195	0	**0**	-30

Southern Group

Fixtures

Home \ Away	OXF	PLY	POL
Oxford		46–44	45–44
Plymouth	49–41		43–47
Poole	61–29	58–32	

Updated to match(es) played on unknown. Source:
Legend: Blue = home team win; Yellow = draw; Red = away team win.

Table

Pos.	Club	M	Home			Away			F	A	B	Pts	+/−
Pos.	Club	M	W	SHL	L	W	SHL	L	F	A	B	Pts	+/−
1	Poole Pirates **(Q)**	4	2	0	0	1	0	1	210	149	2	**8**	+61
2	Oxford Cheetahs	4	2	0	0	0	0	2	161	198	0	**4**	-37
3	Plymouth Gladiators	4	1	0	1	0	0	2	168	192	1	**3**	-24

=== Knockout stages ===
**Semi-finals**
**Poole Pirates**	**59**	45	104
Workington Comets	31	**45**	76
Edinburgh Monarchs	**40**	42	82
**Scunthorpe Scorpions**	49	**48**	97

**Grand Final**
**Poole Pirates**	53	**57**	110
Scunthorpe Scorpions	**37**	33	70

Home team scores are in bold
Overall aggregate scores are in red

=== Final ===
First leg

29 September

Scunthorpe Scorpions; Luke Harrison 12; Connor Mountain 8 Jake Allen 6 Nathan Ablitt 4 Kyle Howarth 4 Simon Lambert 3 Ashton Boughen (guest) 0	37–53	Poole Pirates; Zach Cook 15; Richard Lawson 14; Tom Brennan 10; Charles Wright (guest) 8 Sam Hagon 3 Tobias Thomsen 2 Vinnie Foord 1	Eddie Wright Raceway; Referee(s): Chris Gay

Second leg

2 October

Poole Pirates; Richard Lawson 14; Ben Cook 12; Zach Cook 11; Tom Brennan 10; Tobias Thomsen 6 Dam Hagon 2 Vinnie Foord 2	57–33	Scunthorpe Scorpions; Simon Lambert 8 Connor Mountain 7 Jake Mulford (guest) 7 Nathan Ablitt 6 Leon Flint (guest) 3 Jake Allen 2 Kyle Howarth r/r	Poole Stadium; Referee(s): Simon Humphrey-Kennett

== Pairs Championship ==
The 2024 edition of the SGB Championship Pairs took place on Friday 16 August, at Oxford Stadium, Oxford. The event was won by Redcar Bears.

Qualifying heats

Pos	Team	Pts	Riders
1	Glasgow Tigers	26	Anders Rowe 14, Chris Harris 12
2	Oxford Cheetahs	24	Sam Masters 14, Scott Nicholls 10
3	Poole Pirates	22	Richard Lawson 13, Ben Cook 9
4	Redcar Bears	20	Charles Wright 14, Danny King 6
5	Edinburgh Monarchs	17	Josh Pickering 15, Michele Paco Castagna 2
6	Scunthorpe Scorpions	17	Michael Palm Toft 9, Kyle Howarth 8
7	Berwick Bandits	13	Lewis Kerr 10, Drew Kemp 3
8	Plymouth Gladiators	12	Dan Thompson 9, Ben Barker 3
9	Workington Comets	11	Troy Batchelor 7, Antti Vuolas 4

Semi-finals

Team One	Team Two	Score	Result
Redcar	Glasgow	7-2	Wright 4, King 3, Rowe 2, Harris 0
Oxford	Poole	7-2	Nicholls 4, Masters 3, Lawson 2, Cook 0

Final

Team One	Team Two	Score	Result
Redcar	Oxford	7-2	King 4, Wright 3, Masters 2, Nicholls X

== Riders' Championship ==
The 2024 edition of the SGB Championship Riders Championship took place at the Ecco Arena in Redcar on Sunday 15 September. It was won by Josh Pickering.

Pos.	Rider	Pts	Total	SF	Final
1	(Australia) Josh Pickering (Edinburgh)	3,1,3,2,2	11	3	3
2	(Australia) Ben Cook (Poole)	2,0,3,3,3	11	-	2
3	(England) Richard Lawson (Poole)	3,2,2,3,3	13	-	1
4	(Finland) Antti Vuolas (Workington)	0,1,2,3,3	9	2	0
5	(England) Drew Kemp (Berwick)	2,2,R,1,3	8	1	
6	(England) Danny King (Redcar)	3,3,2,2,0	10	0	
7	(Australia) Sam Masters (Oxford)	3,3,3,0,F	9		
8	(England) Chris Harris (Glasgow)	2,3,1,1,1	8		
9	(England) Jason Edwards (Redcar)	1,2,1,2,2	8		
10	(England) Tom Brennan (Poole)	2,1,0,2,2	7		
11	(England) Ashton Boughen (Oxford)	1,3,2,0,-	6		
12	(England) Dan Thompson (Plymouth)	1,1,3,1,R	6		
13	(England) Charles Wright (Redcar)	E,2,1,R,2	5		
14	(England) Leon Flint (Berwick)	0,0,0,3,1	4		
15	(England) Simon Lambert (Scunthorpe)	1,0,R,1,1	3		
16	(England) Freddie Hodder (Berwick)	-,-,0,F,1	1		
17	(England) Danny Phillips (Unattached)	-,-,-,1,R	1		
18	(Denmark) Michael Palm Toft (Scunthorpe)	0,R,-,-,-	0		

== Leading averages ==
	Rider	Team	Average
1	(England) Richard Lawson	Poole	9.96
2	(Australia) Josh Pickering	Edinburgh	9.76
3	(Australia) Sam Masters	Oxford	9.75
4	(England) Chris Harris	Glasgow	9.62
5	(England) Tom Brennan	Poole	9.59
6	(Australia) Ben Cook	Poole	9.56
7	(England) Scott Nicholls	Oxford	9.24
8	(England) Craig Cook	Workington	9.02
9	(England) Charles Wright	Redcar	9.01
10	(Australia) Troy Batchelor	Workington	8.80

- averages include league, play offs, knockout cup & bsn series, min 6 matches

== Squads & final averages ==
Averages include 2024 Championship, Knockout Cup and BSN Series matches.

Berwick Bandits

- (Australia) Rory Schlein (C) 8.12
- (England) Lewis Kerr 7.34
- (England) Drew Kemp 7.09
- (Denmark) Bastian Borke 6.41
- (Australia) Jye Etheridge 5.46
- (England) Danyon Hume 5.36
- (England) Freddy Hodder 1.81

Edinburgh Monarchs

- (Australia) Josh Pickering 9.76
- (Australia) Justin Sedgmen 7.80
- (Italy) Michele Paco Castagna (C) 7.55
- (Australia) Kye Thomson 7.03
- (Norway) Lasse Fredriksen 5.76
- (England) Connor Coles 4.00
- (England) Max James 2.37

Glasgow Tigers

- (England) Chris Harris (C) 9.62
- (England) Steve Worrall 8.07
- (England) Anders Rowe 7.76
- (England) Leon Flint 7.45
- (Australia) James Pearson 6.29
- (Slovenia) Matic Ivačič 4.61
- (England) Paul Starke 4.45
- (England) Jack Smith 4.34
- (Scotland) Ace Pijper 3.33
- (England) Jason Garrad 0.50

Oxford Cheetahs

- (Australia) Sam Masters 9.75
- (England) Scott Nicholls (C) 9.24
- (Australia) Cameron Heeps 7.39
- (England) Jordan Jenkins 7.19
- (England) Ashton Boughen 5.73
- (Australia) Luke Killeen 5.02
- (England) Henry Atkins 2.20

Plymouth Gladiators

- (England) Dan Thompson 8.26
- (England) Ben Barker (C) 6.69
- (Italy) Nicolás Covatti 6.67
- (England) Joe Thompson 6.44
- (England) Kyle Newman 6.18
- (England) Alfie Bowtell 5.46
- (Australia) Jacob Hook 5.35
- (Denmark) Patrick Baek 3.54

Poole Pirates

- (England) Richard Lawson 9.96
- (England) Tom Brennan 9.59
- (Australia) Ben Cook (C) 9.56
- (Australia) Zach Cook 7.94
- (Denmark) Tobias Thomsen 5.69
- (England) Vinnie Foord 5.14
- (England) Sam Hagon 4.79
- (England) Max Perry 1.73

Redcar Bears

- (England) Charles Wright (C) 9.01
- (England) Danny King 8.31
- (England) Jason Edwards 7.18
- (Australia) Connor Bailey 5.83
- (England) Dan Gilkes 5.57
- (England) Jake Mulford 5.51
- (Denmark) Jonas Knudsen 5.13
- (England) Ben Trigger 3.53

Scunthorpe Scorpions

- (Denmark) Michael Palm Toft 8.00
- (England) Kyle Howarth 7.87
- (Australia) Jake Allen 7.81
- (England) Simon Lambert (C) 7.10
- (England) Connor Mountain 6.94
- (England) Nathan Ablitt 5.56
- (England) Luke Harrison 5.50

Workington Comets

- (England) Craig Cook (C) 9.02
- (Australia) Troy Batchelor 8.80
- (Australia) Tate Zischke 7.28
- (Denmark) Claus Vissing 7.06
- (Finland) Antti Vuolas 6.71
- (England) Paul Starke 4.97
- (Germany) Celina Liebmann 2.61
- (England) Sam McGurk 1.78

== See also ==
- List of United Kingdom speedway league champions
- Knockout Cup (speedway)
