= 2019 British Speedway Championship =

The 2019 British Speedway Championship was the 59th edition of the British Speedway Championship. Robert Lambert was the defending champion having won the title in 2018. The competition consisted of one semi-final and a final, with six riders qualifying from the semi-final, there were 10 riders seeded to the final. These riders were Robert Lambert, Rory Schlein, Chris Harris, Dan Bewley, Craig Cook, Richard Lawson, Edward Kennett, Scott Nicholls, Adam Ellis and Danny King. However, Lambert and Ellis missed out on the final due to injury, so Lambert was unable to defend his title. The championship was won by Charles Wright for the first time, King finished second, while Cook took third place.

== Results ==
=== Semi-final ===
- (England) Redcar
- 31 May 2019

Pos.	Rider	Points	Details
1	Charles Wright	14	(3,2,3,3,3)
2	Richie Worrall	13	(3,3,2,2,3)
3	Danny Ayres	12	(3,1,3,3,2)
4	Paul Starke	11	(3,3,2,3,R)
5	Lewis Kerr	11	(1,2,3,3,2)
6	Steve Worrall	10	(2,R,3,2,3)
7	Ashley Morris	8	(1,3,1,1,2)
8	Tom Bacon	8	(2,3,1,1,1)
9	Simon Lambert	8	(2,1,2,1,2)
10	Kyle Newman	6	(0,2,1,2,1)
11	Stefan Nielsen	5	(2,X,0,0,3)
12	Josh Auty	5	(1,2,0,2,R)
13	Ben Morley	4	(0,1,2,0,1)
14	Drew Kemp	3	(0,1,1,0,1)
15	David Wallinger	2	(1,0,0,1,0)
16	Ben Rathbone	0	(-,0,0,0,0)
17	Jason Garrity	0	(F,-,-,-,-)
18	Kyle Howarth	0	(X,-,-,-,-)

=== The Final ===
- (England) National Speedway Stadium, Gorton
- 29 July 2019

Placing	Rider	Total	1	2	3	4	5	6	7	8	9	10	11	12	13	14	15	16	17	18	19	20	Pts	Pos	21	22
1	(1) Charles Wright	11	3				2				3				0				3				11	4	3	3
2	(5) Danny King	14		3			3					3					2					3	14	1		2
3	(10) Craig Cook	12			3			2						2			3		2				12	2		1
4	(13) Chris Harris	11				3	0							3		2					3		11	3	2	0
5	(14) Steve Worrall	11				2		3					2		2							2	11	5	1	
6	(12) Lewis Kerr	8			1					2		2			3						0		8	6	0	
7	(2) Rory Schlein ( (Australia) )	8	2					1				0				3				2			8	7		
8	(9) Richard Lawson	7			2		1						0					1		3			7	8		
9	(15) Josh Auty	7				1			1			1						3	1				7	9		
10	(3) Edward Kennett	6	1						0				3				1				1		6	10		
11	(6) Danny Ayres	6		1				0			1							2			2		6	11		
12	(16) Scott Nicholls	6				0				3	2						0			1			6	12		
13	(7) Paul Starke	6		2					2					1	1					-			6	13		
14	(11) Dan Bewley	3			0				3		-					-						-	3	14		
15	(8) Kyle Newman	3		0						1			1			1			0				3	15		
16	(4) Simon Lambert	1	0							-				0				0				1	1	16		
17	(17) Kyle Bickley	0																					0	17		
18	(18) Leon Flint	0																					0	18		
Placing	Rider	Total	1	2	3	4	5	6	7	8	9	10	11	12	13	14	15	16	17	18	19	20	Pts	Pos	21	22

m - exclusion for exceeding two minute time allowance • t - exclusion for touching the tapes • x - other exclusion • e - retired or mechanical failure • f - fell • ns - non-starter • nc - non-classify

gate A - inside	gate B	gate C	gate D - outside

=== Under 21 final ===
Robert Lambert won the British Speedway Under 21 Championship for the third consecutive year. The final was held at Shielfield Park on 27 April.

Pos.	Rider	Points	SF	Final
1	Robert Lambert	15	x	3
2	Zach Wajtknecht	11	3	2
3	Jack Thomas	12	2	1
4	Tom Brennan	12	x	0
5	Drew Kemp	12	1	
6	Dan Bewley	12	0	
7	Nathan Greaves	10		
8	Kyle Bickley	8		
9	Jack Smith	7		
10	Leon Flint	7		
11	Ryan Kinsley	5		
12	Jordan Palin	3		
13	Anders Rowe	3		
14	Jason Edwards	2		
15	Luke Harris	1		
16	Harry McGurk	1		
