= 2021 British Speedway Championship =

The 2021 British Speedway Championship was the 61st edition of the British Speedway Championship. The final was held at the National Speedway Stadium and was won by Adam Ellis.

== Results ==
=== The Final ===
- (England) National Speedway Stadium, Manchester
- 16 August 2021

Placing	Rider	Total	1	2	3	4	5	6	7	8	9	10	11	12	13	14	15	16	17	18	19	20	Pts	Pos	21	22
1	(12) Adam Ellis	13			1					3		3			3						3		13	1		3
2	(9) Dan Bewley	12			3		1						3					3		2			12	3	3	2
3	(13) Charles Wright	12				1	3							3		3					2		12	2		1
4	(8) Chris Harris	11		3						1			2			2			3				11	4	2	0
5	(6) Kyle Howarth	10		2				3			3							2			0		10	5	1	
6	(1) Scott Nicholls	10	3				2				2				1				2				10	6	0	
7	(5) Craig Cook	9		1			0					2					3					3	9	7		
8	(11) Lewis Kerr	9			2				3		1					1						2	9	8		
9	(15) Steve Worrall	8				3			2			1						1	1				8	9		
10	(7) Danny King	6		0					1					2	2					1			6	10		
11	(3) Simon Lambert	6	2						0				1				2				1		6	11		
12	(2) Rory Schlein ( (Australia) )	5	0					2				0				0				3			5	12		
13	(16) Richard Lawson	5				2				2	0						1			0			5	13		
14	(4) Ben Barker	3	1							0				1				0				1	3	14		
15	(14) Anders Rowe	1				0		1					0		0							0	1	15		
16	(10) Paul Starke	0			0			0						0			0		0				0	16		
17	(17) Jack Smith	0																					0	17		
18	(18) Paul Bowen	0																					0	18		
Placing	Rider	Total	1	2	3	4	5	6	7	8	9	10	11	12	13	14	15	16	17	18	19	20	Pts	Pos	21	22

m - exclusion for exceeding two minute time allowance • t - exclusion for touching the tapes • x - other exclusion • e - retired or mechanical failure • f - fell • ns - non-starter • nc - non-classify

gate A - inside	gate B	gate C	gate D - outside

=== Under 21 final ===
Tom Brennan won the British Speedway Under 21 Championship held at South Tees Motorsports Park on 16 July.

Pos.	Rider	Points	SF	Final
1	Tom Brennan	15	x	3
2	Drew Kemp	14	x	2
3	Dan Gilkes	10	3	1
4	Jordan Palin	10	2	0
5	Dan Thompson	11	1	
6	Jordan Jenkins	11	0	
7	Jason Edwards	10		
8	Kyle Bickley	9		
9	Jake Mulford	6		
10	Joe Thompson	6		
11	Alex Spooner	5		
12	Sam Bebee	3		
13	Archie Freeman	3		
14	Jack Parkinson Blackburn	2		
15	Nathan Ablitt	2		
16	Tom Spencer	1		
17	Elliot Kelly (res)	0		
18	Ben Trigger (res)	0		
