= 2018 British Speedway Championship =

The 2018 British Speedway Championship was the 58th edition of the British Speedway Championship. Craig Cook was the defending champion having won the title in 2017. The competition consisted of two semi-finals and a final, with eight riders qualifying from each semi-final. The championship was won by Robert Lambert for the first time, scoring a maximum in the final. Dan Bewley finished second in his first ever appearance, while Cook took third place.

== Results ==
=== Semi-Final 1 ===
- (England) Sheffield
- 10 May 2018

Pos.	Rider	Points	Details
1	Jason Garrity	15	(3,3,3,3,3)
2	Kyle Howarth	12	(1,3,2,3,3)
3	Josh Auty	12	(2,3,2,3,2)
4	Edward Kennett	10	(3,2,3,1,1)
5	Robert Lambert	10	(3,2,2,2,1)
6	Rory Schlein ( (Australia) )	10	(2,1,3,2,2)
7	Dan Bewley	9	(0,3,2,1,3)
8	Craig Cook	9	(2,1,3,3,R)
9	Stefan Nielsen	7	0,2,1,1,3)
10	Carl Wilkinson	5	(1,2,0,2,F)
11	Nathan Greaves	4	(2,0,0,0,2)
12	Adam Roynon	4	(0,R,1,2,1)
13	Charles Wright	4	(1,X,1,0,2)
14	Zach Wajtknecht	3	(3,0,0,0,0)
15	Max Clegg	3	(0,1,1,0,1)
16	Danny Ayres	0	(1,F,0,1,0)
	Joe Lawlor	DNS	

=== Semi-Final 2 ===
- (England) Leicester
- 15 May 2018

Pos.	Rider	Points	Details
1	Richard Lawson	13	(2,3,2,3,3)
2	Chris Harris	13	(3,2,3,2,3)
3	Scott Nicholls	12	(1,3,3,3,2)
4	Lewis Kerr	12	(2,2,3,3,2)
5	Richie Worrall	11	(3,3,3,2,-)
6	Danny King	9	(3,3,2,1,N)
7	Ben Barker	8	(1,2,2,0,3)
8	Adam Ellis	8	(3,2,1,X,2)
9	Ashley Morris	6	(1,0,2,3,0)
10	David Howe	6	(2,1,1,2,0)
11	James Sarjeant	5	(2,0,0,1,2)
12	Kyle Newman	5	(0,1,1,2,1)
13	Ben Morley	5	(1,1,0,1,1)
14	Simon Lambert	3	(0,0,0,0,3)
15	James Shanes	3	(0,1,1,0,1)
16	Matt Williamson	1	(0,0,0,1,0)
17	Tom Woolley	1	(-,-,-,-,1)

=== The Final ===
- (England) National Speedway Stadium, Gorton
- 11 June 2018

Placing	Rider	Total	1	2	3	4	5	6	7	8	9	10	11	12	13	14	15	16	17	18	19	20	Pts	Pos	21	22
1	(7) Robert Lambert	15		3					3					3	3					3			15	1		3
2	(4) Dan Bewley	11	2							3				0				3				3	11	3	3	2
3	(13) Craig Cook	11				1	3							1		3					3		11	2		1
4	(16) Jason Garrity	10				3				0	3						2			2			10	4	2	0
5	(12) Scott Nicholls	10			2					3		1			2						2		10	5	1	
6	(8) Kyle Howarth	10		2						1			2			2			3				10	6	0	
7	(3) Rory Schlein ( (Australia) )	9	0						2				3				3				1		9	7		
8	(2) Danny King	8	3					0				3				1				1			8	8		
9	(10) Chris Harris	7			0			3						2			0		2				7	9		
10	(5) Josh Auty	7		1			1					2					1					2	7	10		
11	(1) Richard Lawson	6	1				2				1				1				1				6	11		
12	(6) Lewis Kerr	5		0				1			2							2			0		5	12		
13	(11) Adam Ellis	3			3				0		0					0						0	3	13		
14	(14) Richie Worrall	3				0		2					0		0							1	3	14		
15	(15) Steve Worrall	3				2			1			0						-	-				3	15		
16	(9) Ashley Morris	3			1		0						1					1		0			3	16		
17	(17) Jack Smith	0																					0	17		
18	(18) Kyle Bickley	0																					0	18		
Placing	Rider	Total	1	2	3	4	5	6	7	8	9	10	11	12	13	14	15	16	17	18	19	20	Pts	Pos	21	22

m - exclusion for exceeding two minute time allowance • t - exclusion for touching the tapes • x - other exclusion • e - retired or mechanical failure • f - fell • ns - non-starter • nc - non-classify

gate A - inside	gate B	gate C	gate D - outside

=== Under 21 final ===
Robert Lambert won the British Speedway Under 21 Championship for the second consecutive year. The final was held at Shielfield Park on 1 May.

Pos.	Rider	Points	SF	Final
1	Robert Lambert	15	x	3
2	Connor Mountain	10	3	2
3	Nathan Greaves	10	2	1
4	Dan Bewley	12	x	0
5	Jack Thomas	9	1	
6	Alfie Bowtell	12	0	
7	Jack Smith	8		
8	Zach Wajtknecht	7		
9	Luke Ruddick	7		
10	Josh Bailey	6		
11	Kyle Bickley	5		
12	Max Clegg	5		
13	Drew Kemp	5		
14	Joe Lawlor	2		
15	Taylor Hampshire	2		
16	Leon Flint (res)	1		
17	Jason Edwards	0		
