= SGB Premiership 2018 =

British motorcycle speedway season

- League: SGB Premiership
- Champions: Poole Pirates
- Knockout Cup: Somerset Rebels
- Charity Shield: Swindon Robins
- Individual: Jason Doyle
- Highest average: Robert Lambert
- Division/s below: SGB Championship; National League

The SGB Premiership 2018 was the 84th season of the top division of Great British Speedway in 2018. The season ran between March and October 2018 and had eight teams participating. The line-up of teams remained the same as in 2017. The Swindon Robins were the defending champions after winning the title in 2017. BT Sport continued its TV coverage of the SGB Premiership in 2018. Poole Pirates defeated King's Lynn Stars in the Play off final. It was Poole's tenth tier one title, which brought them level in second place with the Wembley Lions in the historical records.

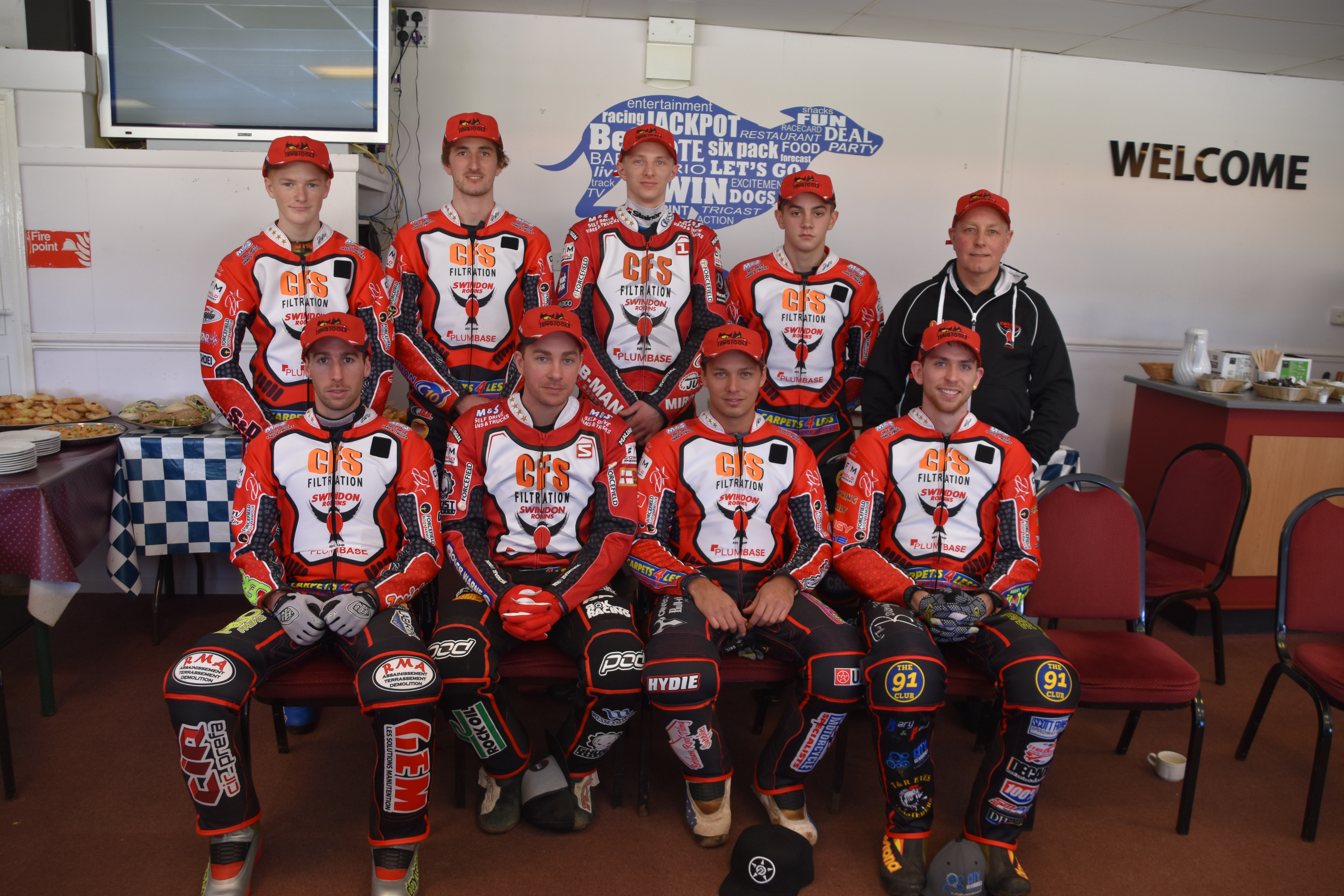
Swindon Robins in March, ready to defend their league title

== 2018 teams ==
Locations of the 2018 Premiership teams

== Regulation changes ==
At the Speedway AGM in November 2017, a number of changes were made to the rules and regulations for 2018. The biggest change was the introduction of fixed race nights: from now on, all Premiership meetings would be held on either a Monday or Wednesday, with Swindon Robins receiving special dispensation to continue to host home meetings on a Thursday. It was hoped that this would result in more of the world's top riders returning to UK racing. However, Premiership teams were only allowed to sign one rider per team with a Premiership average of over 8 points per match, and this rule prevented some of the world's best riders returning to Premiership teams in 2018. The change to race nights also eliminated the possibility of doubling up riders (riding in both of the top two divisions in British Speedway) by being scheduled to ride for two clubs on the same night.

At the BSPA (British Speedway Promoters Association) annual conference, a decision was made to discontinue the end-of-season play-off for promotion and relegation between the bottom team of the SGB Premiership and the SGB Championship play-off winners.

== Results ==
Teams faced each other four times: twice home and away. The first of the home and away meetings were called the 'A' fixtures, and the second were the 'B' fixtures.

=== 'A' Fixtures ===
Home \ Away	BV	KL	LEI	PP	RYE	SOM	SWI	WOL
Belle Vue Aces		43–47	62–28	47–43	59–31	47–43	50–40	56–34
King's Lynn Stars	53–37		56–34	46–44	58–32	44–46	51–39	60–30
Leicester Lions	47–43	38–52		43–47	53–37	55–35	44–46	47–43
Poole Pirates	50–40	58–32	58–32		47–43	47–43	38–52	45–45
Rye House Rockets	44–46	49–41		48–42		48–42		48–42
Somerset Rebels	47–43	45–45	47–43	48–42			50–40	49–41
Swindon Robins	41–49	48–42	51–39	50–39	48–42	58–32		51–39
Wolverhampton Wolves	49–41	49–41	47–43	54–36	60–30	52–38	52–38	

Legend: Blue = home team win; Yellow = draw; Red = away team win.

=== 'B' Fixtures ===
Home \ Away	BV	KL	LEI	PP	RYE	SOM	SWI	WOL
Belle Vue Aces		44–46	57–33	48–42		48–42	55–35	52–38
King's Lynn Stars	49–41		60–30	58–32		49–41	49–41	55–35
Leicester Lions	58–32	40–50		37–53		46–44	48–42	46–44
Poole Pirates	54–35	61–29	43–23			48–42	54–36	55–35
Rye House Rockets								
Somerset Rebels	42–48	61–29	46–32	51–39			54–36	59–31
Swindon Robins	34–56	52–38	55–35	47–42		41–49		50–40
Wolverhampton Wolves	46–44	43–47	56–34	46–44		41–49	53–37	

Legend: Blue = home team win; Yellow = draw; Red = away team win.

=== Table ===
SGB Premiership Final League Table

Pos.	Club	M	Home			Away					F	A	Pts	+/−
Pos.	Club	M	W	D	L	4W	3W	D	1L	L	F	A	Pts	+/−
1	King's Lynn Stars	24	11	0	1	2	3	1	1	5	1128	1032	53	+96
2	Somerset Rebels	24	10	1	1	2	1	0	5	4	1103	1045	47	+58
3	Poole Pirates	24	10	1	1	1	1	0	6	4	1114	1019	44	+95
4	Belle Vue Aces	24	10	0	2	2	1	0	3	6	1118	1041	44	+77
5	Swindon Robins	24	9	0	3	1	1	0	1	9	1060	1098	35	-38
6	Wolverhampton Wolves	24	10	0	2	0	0	1	2	9	1043	1117	34	-74
7	Leicester Lions	24	7	0	5	0	0	0	2	10	955	1169	23	-214

4 July Rye House Rockets had their membership of the 2018 SGB Premiership annulled by the Speedway Control Bureau. The league table has been updated to represent this news.

== Play-offs ==
**Semi Finals**
1	Belle Vue Aces	**41**	36	77
4	**King's Lynn Stars**	49	**54**	113
3	Somerset Rebels	**46**	43	89
2	**Poole Pirates**	44	**47**	91

**Grand Final**
King's Lynn Stars	37	**51**	88
**Poole Pirates**	**53**	39	92

Home team scores are in bold
Overall aggregate scores are in red

=== Semi-finals ===
24 September

Belle Vue Aces	41–49	King's Lynn Stars	National Speedway Stadium; Referee(s): Willie Dishington

1 October

King's Lynn Stars	54–36	Belle Vue Aces	Adrian Flux Arena; Referee(s): Mick Bates

17 September

Somerset Rebels	46–44	Poole Pirates	Oak Tree Arena; Referee(s): Mick Bates

1 October

Poole Pirates	47–43	Somerset Rebels	Poole Stadium; Referee(s): Christina Turnbull

=== Grand final ===
8 October

Poole Pirates; Klindt 11; Worrall 10; Harris 8 Woryna 7 Grajczonek 6 Jakobsen 6 Morris 5	53–37	King's Lynn Stars; R Lambert 12; Ellis 6 Jørgensen 6 Palm Toft 6 Riss 3 Proctor 2 S Lambert 2	Poole Stadium; Referee(s): Craig Ackroyd

10 October

King's Lynn Stars; Riss 13; R Lambert 12; Proctor 10; Jørgensen 6 S Lambert 4 Ellis 3 Howarth 3	51–39	Poole Pirates; Grajczonek 8 Morris 7 Klindt 6 Worrall 6 Harris 5 Jakobsen 5 Woryna 2	Adrian Flux Arena; Referee(s): Graham Flint

Home team scores are in bold

== Knockout Cup ==
The 2018 Knockout Cup was the 76th edition and (second under its new name) of the Knockout Cup for tier one teams.

**Quarter Finals**
1	**Swindon Robins**	**59**	39	98
8	Rye House Rockets	31	**51**	82
5	Leicester Lions	**48**	31	79
4	**King's Lynn Stars**	42	**59**	101
3	**Somerset Rebels**	**52**	47	99
6	Poole Pirates	38	**43**	81
7	**Belle Vue Aces**	**57**	46	103
2	Wolverhampton Wolves	33	**44**	77

**Semi Finals**
Swindon Robins	**48**	39	87
**King's Lynn Stars**	42	**51**	93
**Somerset Rebels**	**52**	40	92
Belle Vue Aces	38	**50**	88

**Final**
King's Lynn Stars	37	**45**	82
**Somerset Rebels**	**53**	45	98

Home team scores are in bold
Overall aggregate scores are in red

Quarter-finals

21 May

Swindon Robins	59–31	Rye House Rockets	Abbey Stadium; Referee(s): Paul Carrington

23 May

Rye House Rockets	51–39	Swindon Robins	Rye House Stadium; Referee(s): Dave Robinson

7 May

Leicester Lions	48–42	King's Lynn Stars	Beaumont Park Sports Complex; Referee(s): Ronnie Allan

16 May

King's Lynn Stars	51–39	Leicester Lions	Adrian Flux Arena; Referee(s): Craig Ackroyd

2 May

Somerset Rebels	52–38	Poole Pirates	Oak Tree Arena; Referee(s): David Watters

27 June

Poole Pirates	43–47	Somerset Rebels	Poole Stadium; Referee(s): Willie Dishington

7 May

Belle Vue Aces	57–33	Wolverhampton Wolves	National Speedway Stadium; Referee(s): Peter Clarke

18 June

Wolverhampton Wolves	44–46	Belle Vue Aces	Monmore Green; Referee(s): Graham Reeve

Semi-finals

10 September

Swindon Robins	48–42	King's Lynn Stars	Abbey Stadium; Referee(s): Dave Watters

17 September

King's Lynn Stars	51–39	Swindon Robins	Adrian Flux Arena; Referee(s): Chris Durno

12 September

Somerset Rebels	52–38	Belle Vue Aces	Oak Tree Arena; Referee(s): Ronnie Allan

19 September

Belle Vue Aces	50–40	Somerset Rebels	National Speedway Stadium; Referee(s): Craig Ackroyd

Grand final

17 October

Somerset Rebels; Covatti 12; Doyle 11; Wright 11; Allen 8 Harris 6 Lawson 5	53–37	King's Lynn Stars; Iversen 10; Jørgensen 7 Riss 6 R Lambert 4 Proctor 4 S Lambert 4 Aarnio 2	Oak Tree Arena; Referee(s): Ronnie Allan

18 October

King's Lynn Stars; R Lambert 12; Riss 10; Iversen 7 Jørgensen 6 Proctor 6 S Lambert 2 Aarnio 2	45–45	Somerset Rebels; Covatti 12; Doyle 9 Lawson 9 Harris 8 Starke 6 Garcia 1	Adrian Flux Arena; Referee(s): Tony Steele

== Charity Shield ==
19 March

Belle Vue Aces	48–42	Swindon Robins	National Speedway Stadium; Referee(s): Stuart Wilson

22 March

Swindon Robins	52–38	Belle Vue Aces	Abbey Stadium; Referee(s): Christina Turnball

== Riders' Championship ==
Jason Doyle won the Riders' Championship for the second time. The final was held at Wimborne Road on 9 May.

Pos.	Rider	Pts	Total	SF	Final
1	(Australia) Jason Doyle	2,3,2,3,3	13	x	3
2	(Australia) Troy Batchelor	2,2,3,3,3	13	x	2
3	(Denmark) Hans Andersen	0,2,3,3,2	10	2	1
4	(Australia) Brady Kurtz	3,3,3,2,0	11	3	0
5	(Sweden) Jacob Thorssell	2,3,1,3,0	9	1	
6	(England) Chris Harris	3,3,0,1,2	9	0	
7	(Australia) Max Fricke	1,1,2,2,3	9		
8	(Australia) Nick Morris	3,2,f/exc,1,1	7		
9	(England) Charles Wright	2,0,2,2,1	7		
10	(Australia) Ty Proctor	1,2,1,f,3	7		
11	(Denmark) Niels Kristian Iversen	0,ret,2,2,2	6		
12	(Australia) Sam Masters	3,ret,3,ret,ret	6		
13	(England) Adam Ellis	1,1,0,1,2	5		
14	(Australia) Josh Grajczonek	1,1,0,1,1	4		
15	(England) Kyle Newman	0,1,1,0,1	3		
16	(England) Scott Nicholls	0,0,1	1		

- f=fell, exc=excluded, ret=retired

== Leading averages ==
Rider	Team	Average
(England) Robert Lambert	King's Lynn	9.93
(Australia) Jason Doyle	Somerset	9.79
(Australia) Max Fricke	Belle Vue	8.73
(Australia) Troy Batchelor	Swindon	8.54
(Australia) Rory Schlein	Wolverhampton	8.43
(Australia) Sam Masters	Wolverhampton	8.42
(England) Craig Cook	Belle Vue	8.13
(England) Dan Bewley	Belle Vue	8.00
(Denmark) Hans Andersen	Leicester	8.00
(England) Chris Harris	Poole	7.78

== Riders & final averages ==
Belle Vue Aces

- (Australia) Max Fricke 8.73
- (England) Craig Cook 8.13
- (England) Dan Bewley 8.00
- (Australia) Rohan Tungate 7.89
- (England) Jason Garrity 7.56
- (England) Steve Worrall 6.35
- (France) Dimitri Bergé 5.49
- (Australia) Jye Etheridge 5.14
- (England) Paul Starke 4.75
- (Poland) Damian Dróżdż 4.13
- (Germany) Mark Riss 3.54

20 March Paul Starke replaced the injured Damian Dróżdż in the Belle Vue team
26 April Damian Dróżdż replaced Paul Starke in the Belle Vue team
13 June Jason Garrity replaced the injured Steve Worrall as a short-term replacement in the Belle Vue Aces team
11 July Steve Worrall returned to the Belle Vue after injury replacing short-term replacement Jason Garrity in the side.
1 August Mark Riss replaced Jye Etheridge in the Belle Vue team
10 August Dimitri Bergé replaced Damian Dróżdż in the Belle Vue team

King's Lynn Stars

- (England) Robert Lambert 9.93
- (Denmark) Niels Kristian Iversen 7.87
- (Australia) Ty Proctor 7.24
- (Germany) Erik Riss 7.22
- (Denmark) Thomas Jørgensen 7.08
- (Denmark) Michael Palm Toft 6.57
- (England) Lewis Kerr 6.43
- (England) Jason Garrity 6.40
- (England) Simon Lambert 4.07
- (Denmark) Kasper Andersen 3.45
- (England) Lewis Rose 2.67

30 April Michael Palm Toft replaced Lewis Rose in the King's Lynn team
11 July Simon Lambert replaced the injured Kasper Andersen in the King's Lynn team
17 July Jason Garrity replaced the injured Lewis Kerr in the King's Lynn team
6 August Erik Riss replaced short-term signing Jason Garrity in the King's Lynn team

Leicester Lions

- (Denmark) Hans Andersen 8.00
- (Denmark) Kenneth Bjerre 7.23
- (England) Scott Nicholls 6.97
- (Poland) Krystian Pieszczek 6.79
- (England) Danny King 6.29
- (United States) Ricky Wells 6.23
- (England) Kyle Newman 6.22
- (England) Charles Wright 5.98
- (England) Josh Auty 4.86
- (Australia) Todd Kurtz 4.43
- (England) James Sarjeant 4.17
- (England) Stuart Robson 4.16
- (England) Connor Mountain 3.66

4 April Michael Palm Toft replaced the injured Josh Bates in the Leicester team
20 April Kenneth Bjerre and Todd Kurtz replaced the injured Martin Vaculik and Michael Palm Toft in the Leicester team
29 June Ricky Wells and Charles Wright replaced the injured Danny King and Kyle Newman in the Leicester team
18 July Scott Nicholls, Stuart Robson, Josh Auty and Connor Mountain replaced Kenneth Bjerre, Krystian Pieszczek, Todd Kurtz and James Sarjeant in the Leicester team

Poole Pirates

- (Denmark) Nicolai Klindt 8.07
- (England) Chris Harris 7.60
- (Sweden) Linus Sundström 7.48
- (Australia) Brady Kurtz 7.41
- (Australia) Josh Grajczonek 7.28
- (Poland) Kacper Woryna 6.88
- (Denmark) Peter Kildemand 6.83
- (England) Richie Worrall 6.65
- (Denmark) Frederik Jakobsen 6.32
- (England) Stefan Nielsen 6.12
- (Poland) Mateusz Szczepaniak 6.00
- (England) James Shanes 3.38
- (England) Paul Starke 1.33

2 April Peter Kildemand replaced Chris Holder in the Poole team
4 May Stefan Nielsen replaced James Shanes in the Poole team
12 May Richie Worrall replaced Peter Kildemand in the Poole team
28 May Paul Starke was used as a short-term replacement replaced the injured Stefan Nielsen in the Poole team until Nicolai Klindt is available
29 June Frederik Jakobsen replaced Mateusz Szczepaniak in the Poole team
12 July Chris Harris replaced Linus Sundström in the Poole team

Rye House Rockets

- (Denmark) Nikolaj Busk Jakobsen
- (England) Max Clegg
- (England) Chris Harris
- (Poland) Krzysztof Kasprzak
- (England) Scott Nicholls
- (England) Stuart Robson
- (Australia) Aaron Summers

21 March Aaron Summers replaced Ben Barker in the Rye House team
3 May Nikolaj Busk Jakobsen replaced the injured Stuart Robson in the Rye House team
12 June Stuart Robson replaced the injured Edward Kennett in the Rye House team
4 July Rye House had their membership of the 2018 SGB Premiership annulled by the Speedway Control Bureau.

Somerset Rebels

- (Australia) Jason Doyle 9.79
- (Australia) Jack Holder 7.97
- (England) Richard Lawson 6.97
- (England) Charles Wright 6.29
- (New Zealand) Bradley Wilson-Dean 6.24
- (Argentina) Nicolás Covatti 6.15
- (Australia) Aaron Summers 5.64
- (Australia) Jake Allen 5.53
- (Denmark) Jonas Jeppesen 3.81
- (Denmark) Claus Vissing 1.14

18 June Claus Vissing and Nicolás Covatti replaced Charles Wright and Jonas Jeppesen in the Somerset team
7 July Aaron Summers replaced Claus Vissing in the Somerset team

Swindon Robins

- (Australia) Troy Batchelor 8.54
- (Australia) Nick Morris 7.93
- (Poland) Tobiasz Musielak 7.10
- (England) Adam Ellis 7.07
- (France) David Bellego 6.60
- (England) Zach Wajtknecht 5.27
- (England) Jack Smith 1.03
- (Australia) Mitchell Davey 0.89

14 May Jack Smith replaced the injured Mitchell Davey in the Swindon team

Wolverhampton Wolves

- (Australia) Rory Schlein 8.43
- (Australia) Sam Masters 8.42
- (Sweden) Jacob Thorssell 7.91
- (England) Kyle Howarth 6.09
- (Denmark) Jonas B. Andersen 5.88
- (Australia) Cameron Heeps 4.87
- (England) Ashley Morris 4.76
- (England) Nathan Greaves 4.13

3 August Jonas Andersen replaced Cameron Heeps in the Wolverhampton team

== See also ==
- SGB Championship 2018 – the second division of British speedway
- List of United Kingdom speedway league champions
- Knockout Cup (speedway)
