= SGB Premiership 2019 =

British motorcycle speedway season

- League: SGB Premiership
- Champions: Swindon Robins
- Knockout Cup: Swindon Robins
- Premiership Shield: Poole Pirates
- Riders' Championship: not held
- Highest average: Jason Doyle
- Division/s below: SGB Championship; National Development League

The SGB Premiership 2019 was the 85th season of the top division, called the SGB Premiership, of the British speedway championship. Two teams from the 2018 season, Leicester Lions and Somerset Rebels, dropped down to the next league down, the SGB Championship, and were replaced in the league by Ipswich Witches and Peterborough Panthers.

Locations of the 2019 SGB Premiership teams

== Background ==
The league ran between March and October 2019 and had seven teams participating. The line-up of teams changed from the previous 2018 league season with both Leicester Lions and Somerset Rebels dropping down into the SGB Championship and being replaced by two 2018 SGB Championship teams, Ipswich Witches and Peterborough Panthers. Rye House Rockets who withdrew from the 2018 season, did not re-enter the league. Poole Pirates were the defending champions after winning the title in 2018. BT Sport continued its TV coverage of the SGB Premiership in 2019.

At the Speedway AGM in November 2018, a number of changes were made to the rules and regulations for 2019. The biggest change was the introduction of fixed race nights: all Premiership meetings would be held on either a Monday or Thursday. Riders in teams must have achieved a minimum average of 3.00 to be able to race in the league, although the team points limit remained at 42.50.

== League results ==
Teams face each other four times: twice home and away. The first of the home and away meetings are called the 'A' fixtures, and the second are the 'B' fixtures.

A Fixtures

| Home \ Away | BV | IPS | KL | PET | PP | SWI | WOL |
|---|---|---|---|---|---|---|---|
| Belle Vue Aces | | 47–43 | 54–36 | 51–39 | 45–45 | 49–41 | 56–34 |
| Ipswich Witches | 52–38 | | 49–41 | 49–41 | 49–41 | 37–53 | 46–44 |
| King's Lynn Stars | 54–36 | 45–45 | | 55–35 | 57–33 | 49–40 | 52–38 |
| Peterborough Panthers | 40–50 | 39–51 | 45–45 | | 46–44 | 50–40 | 41–49 |
| Poole Pirates | 55–35 | 48–42 | 49–41 | 43–47 | | 51–39 | 51–39 |
| Swindon Robins | 55–35 | 46–44 | 50–40 | 46–44 | 45–45 | | 52–38 |
| Wolverhampton Wolves | 36–52 | 50–40 | 51–39 | 59–31 | 44–46 | 46–44 | |

Legend: Blue = home team win; Yellow = draw; Red = away team win.

B Fixtures

| Home \ Away | BV | IPS | KL | PET | PP | SWI | WOL |
|---|---|---|---|---|---|---|---|
| Belle Vue Aces | | 49–41 | 54–36 | 62–28 | 44–46 | 48–42 | 43–47 |
| Ipswich Witches | 48–42 | | 48–42 | 54–36 | 43–47 | 48–42 | 41–37 |
| King's Lynn Stars | 55–35 | 57–33 | | 53–37 | 39–51 | 39–51 | 54–36 |
| Peterborough Panthers | 42–48 | 38–51 | 54–36 | | 46–44 | 44–46 | 48–42 |
| Poole Pirates | 37–35 | 51–39 | 58–32 | 50–40 | | 45–44 | 41–49 |
| Swindon Robins | 58–32 | 66–24 | 50–40 | 65–25 | 53–37 | | 46–44 |
| Wolverhampton Wolves | 54–36 | 45–45 | 53–36 | 56–34 | 55–35 | 48–42 | |

Legend: Blue = home team win; Yellow = draw; Red = away team win.

== League table ==
Final table, up to and including Wednesday 18 September

| Pos. | Club | M | Home | | | Away | | | | | F | A | Pts | +/− |
| Pos. | Club | M | W | D | L | 4W | 3W | D | 1L | L | F | A | Pts | +/− |
|---|---|---|---|---|---|---|---|---|---|---|---|---|---|---|
| 1 | Poole Pirates | 24 | 10 | 0 | 2 | 1 | 4 | 2 | 2 | 3 | 1101 | 1041 | 52 | +60 |
| 2 | Swindon Robins | 24 | 11 | 1 | 0 | 2 | 0 | 0 | 6 | 4 | 1156 | 1003 | 50 | +153 |
| 3 | Wolverhampton Wolves | 24 | 9 | 1 | 2 | 2 | 1 | 0 | 4 | 5 | 1096 | 1051 | 43 | +45 |
| 4 | Ipswich Witches | 24 | 9 | 0 | 3 | 2 | 0 | 2 | 3 | 5 | 1055 | 1092 | 42 | -37 |
| 5 | Belle Vue Aces | 24 | 9 | 1 | 2 | 2 | 1 | 0 | 2 | 7 | 1076 | 1066 | 41 | +10 |
| 6 | King's Lynn Stars | 24 | 9 | 1 | 2 | 0 | 0 | 1 | 1 | 10 | 1073 | 1085 | 31 | -12 |
| 7 | Peterborough Panthers | 24 | 5 | 1 | 6 | 0 | 1 | 0 | 1 | 10 | 970 | 1189 | 20 | -219 |

== Play-offs ==
**Semi Finals**
1 | Poole Pirates | **50** | 36 | 86
4 | **Ipswich Witches** | 40 | **54** | 94
3 | **Swindon Robins** | 49 | **58** | 107
2 | Wolverhampton Wolves | **39** | 32 | 71

**Grand Final**
Ipswich Witches | **41** | 27 | 68
**Swindon Robins** | 49 | **62** | 111

Home team scores are in bold
Overall aggregate scores are in red

Semi-finals

26 September

Poole Pirates | 50–40 | Ipswich Witches | Poole Stadium; Referee(s): Christina Turnball

28 September

Ipswich Witches | 54–36 | Poole Pirates | Foxhall Stadium; Referee(s): Chris Gay

9 October

Wolverhampton Wolves | 39–49 | Swindon Robins | Monmore Green; Referee(s): Graham Flint

10 October

Swindon Robins | 58–32 | Wolverhampton Wolves | Abbey Stadium; Referee(s): Darren Hartley

Grand final

15 October

Ipswich Witches; Iversen 9 Allen 11; Lawson 7 Heeps 6 Harris 6 King 4 Sargeant 0 | 41–49 | Swindon Robins; Musielak 12; Doyle 11; Ellis 8 Jensen 8 Perks 5 Batchelor 4 Vissing 1 | Foxhall Stadium; Referee(s): Mick Bates

17 October

Swindon Robins; Doyle 13; Musielak 12; Jensen 11; Batchelor 9 Ellis 8 Vissing 5 Perks 4 | 62–27 | Ipswich Witches; Allen 11; Harris 6 Iversen 5 King 3 Sargeant 1 Heeps 1 Lawson 0 | Abbey Stadium; Referee(s): Christina Turnball

== Premiership Supporters Cup ==
The 2019 Knockout Cup (branded as the Premiership Supporters Cup) was the 77th edition of the Knockout Cup for tier one teams.

=== Northern Group ===
| Home \ Away | BV | PET | WOL |
|---|---|---|---|
| Belle Vue Aces | | 50–40 | 54–36 |
| Peterborough Panthers | 42–48 | | 46–44 |
| Wolverhampton Wolves | 52–38 | not held | |

Legend: Blue = home team win; Yellow = draw; Red = away team win.

The Wolverhampton Wolves Vs Peterborough Panthers fixture was not restaged after one postponement, and one abandonment.

Northern Group Table
Final table, up to and including Monday 22 April

| Pos. | Club | M | Home | | | Away | | | | | F | A | Pts | +/− |
| Pos. | Club | M | W | D | L | 4W | 3W | D | 1L | L | F | A | Pts | +/− |
|---|---|---|---|---|---|---|---|---|---|---|---|---|---|---|
| 1 | Belle Vue Aces | 4 | 2 | 0 | 0 | 0 | 1 | 0 | 0 | 1 | 190 | 170 | 9 | +20 |
| 2 | Wolverhampton Wolves | 3 | 1 | 0 | 0 | 0 | 0 | 0 | 1 | 1 | 132 | 138 | 4 | -6 |
| 3 | Peterborough Panthers | 3 | 1 | 0 | 1 | 0 | 0 | 0 | 0 | 1 | 128 | 142 | 3 | -14 |

=== Southern Group ===
| Home \ Away | IPS | KL | PP | SWI |
|---|---|---|---|---|
| Ipswich Witches | | 59–31 | 52–38 | 48–42 |
| King's Lynn Stars | 52–38 | | 41–49 | 47–43 |
| Poole Pirates | 46–44 | not held | | 37–53 |
| Swindon Robins | 51–39 | 58–32 | 45–45 | |

Legend: Blue = home team win; Yellow = draw; Red = away team win.

The Poole Pirates Vs King's Lynn Stars fixture was not restaged after it was postponed twice

Southern Group Table
Final table, up to and including Thursday 27 June

| Pos. | Club | M | Home | | | Away | | | | | F | A | Pts | +/− |
| Pos. | Club | M | W | D | L | 4W | 3W | D | 1L | L | F | A | Pts | +/− |
|---|---|---|---|---|---|---|---|---|---|---|---|---|---|---|
| 1 | Swindon Robins | 6 | 2 | 1 | 0 | 1 | 0 | 0 | 2 | 0 | 292 | 248 | 13 | +44 |
| 2 | Ipswich Witches | 6 | 3 | 0 | 0 | 0 | 0 | 0 | 1 | 2 | 280 | 260 | 10 | +20 |
| 3 | Poole Pirates | 5 | 1 | 0 | 1 | 1 | 0 | 1 | 0 | 1 | 215 | 235 | 9 | -20 |
| 4 | King's Lynn Stars | 5 | 2 | 0 | 1 | 0 | 0 | 0 | 0 | 2 | 203 | 247 | 6 | -44 |

=== Grand final ===
12 September

Belle Vue Aces; Bewley 13; Lidsey 13; Fricke 9 Worrall 7 Etheridge 4 Berge 3 | 49–41 | Swindon Robins; Doyle 10; Batchelor 10; Musielak 9 Ellis 5 Jensen 4 Vissing 3 Perks 0 | National Speedway Stadium; Referee(s): Phil Griffin

19 September

Swindon Robins; Doyle 11; Batchelor 10; Ellis 10; Musielak 8 Jensen 8 Perks 5 Vissing 4 | 56–34 | Belle Vue Aces; Fricke 9 Bjerre 6 Lidsey 6 Worrall 5 Bewley 4 Etheridge 4 Berge 0 | Abbey Stadium; Referee(s): Jim McGregor

== SGB Premiership Shield ==
8 April

King's Lynn Stars | 40–50 | Poole Pirates | Adrian Flux Arena; Referee(s): Chris Durno

11 April

Poole Pirates | 44–46 | King's Lynn Stars | Poole Stadium; Referee(s): Tony Steele

== Leading averages ==
Final SGB Premiership Averages

| Rider | Team | Average |
|---|---|---|
| (Australia) Jason Doyle | Swindon | 9.89 |
| (Australia) Troy Batchelor | Swindon | 9.36 |
| (Australia) Max Fricke | Belle Vue | 9.23 |
| (Denmark) Kenneth Bjerre | Belle Vue | 8.47 |
| (England) Robert Lambert | King's Lynn | 8.32 |
| (Denmark) Rasmus Jensen | Swindon | 8.32 |
| (England) Craig Cook | King's Lynn | 8.28 |
| (Denmark) Niels-Kristian Iversen | Ipswich | 8.25 |
| (Australia) Brady Kurtz | Poole | 8.25 |
| (Australia) Sam Masters | Wolverhampton | 8.19 |
| (Australia) Jack Holder | Poole | 8.14 |
| (Denmark) Nicolai Klindt | Poole | 8.11 |
| (Australia) Josh Grajczonek | Poole | 8.04 |

Official Speedway GB Green Sheets Averages

== Riders and final averages ==
Belle Vue Aces

- (Australia) Max Fricke 9.23
- (Denmark) Kenneth Bjerre 8.47
- (England) Dan Bewley 6.84
- (England) Steve Worrall 6.40
- (Denmark) Nikolaj Busk Jakobsen 5.65
- (Australia) Jaimon Lidsey 5.38
- (Australia) Jye Etheridge 5.00
- (United States) Ricky Wells 4.96
- (France) Dimitri Bergé 4.77
- (Finland) Tero Aarnio 0.00

27 June Aarnio replaced Ricky Wells in the Belle Vue Aces team
30 July Nikolaj Busk Jakobsen 5.65 replaced the injured Tero Aarnio in the Belle Vue Aces team
23 August Jye Etheridge replaced the injured Nikolaj Busk Jakobsen in the Belle Vue Aces team

Ipswich Witches

- (Denmark) Niels-Kristian Iversen 8.25
- (England) Danny King 7.44
- (Australia) Cameron Heeps 7.34
- (England) Richard Lawson 7.05
- (England) Chris Harris 6.46
- (Australia) Jake Allen 6.27
- (Poland) Krystian Pieszczek 5.93
- (England) Edward Kennett 5.62
- (France) David Bellego 5.19
- (England) James Sarjeant 3.60

7 June Edward Kennett replaced David Bellego in the Ipswich Witches team
27 August Niels-Kristian Iversen and James Sarjeant replaced Edward Kennett and Krystian Pieszczek in the Ipswich Witches team

King's Lynn Stars

- (England) Robert Lambert 8.32
- (England) Craig Cook 8.28
- (Denmark) Michael Palm Toft 7.17
- (Germany) Erik Riss 6.92
- (Denmark) Thomas Jørgensen 6.51
- (England) Lewis Kerr 6.47
- (Denmark) Kasper Andersen 5.65
- (Australia) Ty Proctor 5.40
- (England) Simon Lambert 3.87
- (Denmark) Nicklas Porsing 2.53

28 May Craig Cook and Simon Lambert replaced Kasper Andersen and the injured Erik Riss in the King's Lynn Stars team
27 June Broc Nicol and Erik Riss replaced Simon Lambert and Ty Proctor in the King's Lynn Stars team
17 July Nicklas Porsing replaced the planned signed rider Broc Nicol due to his injuries in the King's Lynn Stars team

Peterborough Panthers

- (England) Charles Wright 7.22
- (Australia) Rohan Tungate 6.97
- (Denmark) Hans Andersen 6.11
- (England) Scott Nicholls 5.91
- (New Zealand) Bradley Wilson-Dean 6.13
- (Denmark) Ulrich Østergaard 5.65
- (Australia) Aaron Summers 5.57
- (England) Jason Garrity 5.50
- (Australia) Ty Proctor 4.83
- (England) Ben Barker 4.40
- (Denmark) Lasse Bjerre 4.00
- (England) Josh Bates 3.50

18 January Chris Harris is released from his Peterborough Panthers contract
27 March Craig Cook is released from his Peterborough Panthers contract
30 March Aaron Summers signed for Peterborough Panthers
21 May Josh Bates and Scott Nicholls replaced Ben Barker and Lasse Bjerre in the Peterborough Panthers team
27 June Ty Proctor replaced the injured Bradley Wilson-Dean in the Peterborough Panthers team
14 August Jason Garrity replaced the injured Josh Bates in the Peterborough Panthers team
27 August Ulrich Østergaard replaced the injured Aaron Summers in the Peterborough Panthers team

Poole Pirates

- (Australia) Brady Kurtz 8.25
- (Australia) Jack Holder 8.14
- (Denmark) Nicolai Klindt 8.11
- (Australia) Josh Grajczonek 8.04
- (Italy) Nicolás Covatti 6.09
- (England) Richie Worrall 5.37
- (Denmark) Nikolaj Busk Jakobsen 5.33
- (United States) Ricky Wells 4.58
- (Sweden) Thomas H. Jonasson 4.19

17 July Ricky Wells replaced Nikolaj Busk Jakobsen in the Poole Pirates team
27 August Thomas H. Jonasson replaced the injured Richie Worrall in the Poole Pirates team

Swindon Robins

- (Australia) Jason Doyle 9.89
- (Australia) Troy Batchelor 9.36
- (Denmark) Rasmus Jensen 8.32
- (England) Adam Ellis 7.27
- (Poland) Tobiasz Musielak 7.05
- (France) David Bellego 5.87
- (Denmark) Claus Vissing 4.30
- (England) Ellis Perks 4.24
- (Poland) Dawid Lampart 4.00
- (England) James Shanes 2.33
- (England) Zach Wajtknecht 1.33
- (England) Stefan Nielsen 0.00

23 May Ellis Perks replaced James Shanes in the Swindon Robins team
2 May Rasmus Jensen replaced Dawid Lampart in the Swindon Robins team
5 June Zach Wajtknecht stood down from the Swindon Robins team with Stefan Nielsen replacing him
19 June David Bellego replaced the injured Tobiasz Musielak in the Swindon Robins team
10 July Claus Vissing replaced the injured Stefan Nielsen in the Swindon Robins team
16 July Tobiasz Musielak replaced David Bellego in the Swindon Robins team

Wolverhampton Wolves

- (England) Scott Nicholls 8.35
- (Australia) Sam Masters 8.19
- (Sweden) Jacob Thorssell 7.71
- (Australia) Rory Schlein 7.50
- (England) Kyle Howarth 6.79
- (Australia) Nick Morris 6.53
- (United States) Luke Becker 5.89
- (Australia) Ryan Douglas 5.64
- (Australia) Ashley Morris 3.26

14 March Scott Nicholls replaced the injured Jacob Thorssell in the Wolverhampton Wolves team
21 May Jacob Thorssell replaced Scott Nicholls in the Wolverhampton Wolves team
29 June Ryan Douglas replaced Ashley Morris in the Wolverhampton Wolves team

== See also ==
- List of United Kingdom speedway league champions
- Knockout Cup (speedway)
