= SGB Premiership 2024 =

89th season of British Speedway

- League: Premiership
- No. of competitors: 7
- Champions: Belle Vue Aces
- Knockout Cup: Sheffield Tigers
- Highest average: Jason Doyle
- Division/s below: SGB Championship; NDL 2024

The 2024 SGB ROWE Motor Oil Premiership was the 89th season of the top tier of British speedway and the 7th known as the SGB Premiership.

The defending champions were Sheffield Tigers and Ipswich Witches were the defending Knockout Cup champions.

Belle Vue Aces won the title, while Sheffield Tigers won the Knockout Cup.

Locations of the 2024 SGB Premiership teams

== Summary ==
The league consisted of seven teams despite the loss of Peterborough Panthers and Wolverhampton Wolves. They were replaced by Birmingham Brummies, who joined from the Championship (tier 2), and Oxford Spires (a third and new team from the Oxford Cheetahs promotion).

== League ==
=== Regular season ===
League table

Pos.	Club	M	Home			Away			F	A	B	Pts	+/−
Pos.	Club	M	W	SHL	L	W	SHL	L	F	A	B	Pts	+/−
1	Sheffield Tigers **(Q)**	24	11	0	1	5	0	7	1129	1000	10	**42**	+129
2	Leicester Lions **(Q)**	24	10	0	2	5	1	6	1125	1010	9	**40**	+115
3	Belle Vue Aces **(Q)**	24	11	0	1	3	0	9	1088	1030	9	**37**	+58
4	Ipswich Witches **(Q)**	24	8	0	4	6	0	6	1067	1051	6	**34**	+16
5	Oxford Spires	24	9	1	2	2	0	10	1033	1091	3	**26**	-58
6	King's Lynn Stars	24	8	1	3	2	0	10	1022	1105	3	**22**†	-83
7	Birmingham Brummies	24	3	1	8	1	0	11	967	1144	2	**11**	-177

† King's Lynn were deducted 2 Premiership points for breaching SCB regulations on postponing fixtures.

A fixtures

Home \ Away	BEL	BIR	IPS	KLN	LEI	OXF	SHF
Belle Vue		57–33	55–35	48–42	51–33	51–39	25–35
Birmingham	47–43		49–41	43–47	29–43	42–48	45–45
Ipswich	51–39	49–41		37–23	60–30	45–39	50–40
King's Lynn	42–48	49–41	45–45		38–52	50–40	51–39
Leicester	53–37	53–37	43–47	47–42		54–36	44–46
Oxford	46–44	47–43	42–48	47–43	46–44		47–43
Sheffield	54–36	54–36	44–46	58–32	50–40	49–41	

Legend: Blue = home team win; Yellow = draw; Red = away team win.

B fixtures

Home \ Away	BEL	BIR	IPS	KLN	LEI	OXF	SHF
Belle Vue		53–37	58–26	53–37	48–42	54–36	48–42
Birmingham	44–46		47–43	43–46	44–46	23–37	43–47
Ipswich	41–49	44–46		57–33	36–54	53–37	38–52
King's Lynn	51–39	57–33	41–49		48–42	48–42	48–42
Leicester	55–35	48–42	53–37	48–42		53–37	53–37
Oxford	53–37	46–44	45–45	54–36	40–50		48–42
Sheffield	56–34	55–35	46–44	58–31	45–45	50–40	

Legend: Blue = home team win; Yellow = draw; Red = away team win.

=== Play Offs ===
**Semi Finals**
1	Sheffield Tigers	39	**50**	89
4	**Belle Vue Aces**	**51**	40	91
3	Ipswich Witches	**49**	39	88
2	**Leicester Lions**	41	**51**	92

**Grand Final**
**Belle Vue Aces**	**54**	49	103
Leicester Lions	36	**41**	77

Home team scores are in bold
Overall aggregate scores are in red

=== Grand Final ===
First leg

23 September

Belle Vue Aces; Dan Bewley 15; Brady Kurtz 10; Jaimon Lidsey 10; Niels Kristian Iversen (guest) 8 Norick Blödorn 6 Antti Vuolas 3 Jake Mulford 2	54–36	Leicester Lions; Ryan Douglas 7 Richard Lawson 6 Sam Hagon 6 Sam Masters 5 Luke Becker 5 Max Fricke 4 Lewis Kerr (guest) 3	National Speedway Stadium; Referee(s): Phil Griffin

Second leg

3 October

Leicester Lions; Sam Masters 11; Richard Lawson 8 Max Fricke 7 Ryan Douglas 7 Luke Becker 4 Sam Hagon 2 Drew Kemp (guest) 1	41–49	Belle Vue Aces; Dan Bewley 15; Brady Kurtz 11; Jaimon Lidsey 9 Ben Cook 4 Norick Blödorn 4 Jake Mulford 3 Antti Vuolas 3	Beaumont Park; Referee(s): Willie Dishington

== Knockout Cup ==
The 2024 Knockout Cup was the 79th edition of the Knockout Cup for tier one teams. Oxford Spires declined to enter.

Bracket

**Quarter Finals**
Belle Vue Aces	**49**	41	90+2
**Sheffield Tigers**	41	**49**	90+7
Leicester Lions	**42**	43	85
**Ipswich Witches**	48	**47**	95

**Semi Finals**
**Sheffield Tigers**	40	**54**	94
King's Lynn Stars	**50**	36	86
Birmingham Brummies	**44**	39	83
**Ipswich Witches**	46	**51**	97

**Final**
**Sheffield Tigers**	**55**	45	100
Ipswich Witches	35	**45**	80

Home team scores are in bold, with overall aggregate scores noted in red

=== Final ===
First Leg

2 September

Sheffield Tigers; Jack Holder 18; Josh Pickering 17; Chris Holder 10; Jason Edwards 6 Kyle Howarth 3 Dan Gilkes 1 Tai Woffinden r/r	55–35	Ipswich Witches; Jaimon Lidsey (guest) 7 Keynan Rew 6 Tom Brennan (guest) 6 Adam Ellis 5 Dan Thompson 4 Danny King 4 Jordan Jenkins 3	Owlerton Stadium; Referee(s): Paul Carrington

Second Leg

5 September

Ipswich Witches; Keynan Rew 14; Tom Brennan (guest) 9 Dan Thompson 9 Danny King; Adam Ellis 4 James Pearson (guest) 0 Jason Doyle r/r	45–45	Sheffield Tigers; Josh Pickering 14; Chris Holder 11; Kyle Howarth 9 Jack Holder 8 Jason Edwards 2 Dan Gilkes 1 Tai Woffinden r/r	Foxhall Stadium; Referee(s): Chris Gay

== Leading averages ==
	Rider	Team	Average
1	(Australia) Jason Doyle	Ipswich	9.94
2	(Russia) Emil Sayfutdinov	Ipswich	9.50
3	(Australia) Jack Holder	Sheffield	9.48
4	(England) Tai Woffinden	Sheffield	9.35
5	(Australia) Brady Kurtz	Belle Vue	9.33
6	(England) Dan Bewley	Belle Vue	9.20
7	(Australia) Max Fricke	Leicester	9.18
8	(Australia) Chris Holder	Sheffield	8.92
9	(Sweden) Fredrik Lindgren	Birmingham	8.91
10	(Australia) Rohan Tungate	Oxford	8.00

- averages include league, play offs & knockout cup, min 6 matches

== Squads & final averages ==
Averages include 2024 Premiership and Knockout Cup matches.

=== Belle Vue Aces ===
- (Australia) Brady Kurtz (C) 9.33
- (England) Dan Bewley 9.20
- (Australia) Jaimon Lidsey 7.45
- (Australia) Ben Cook 7.32
- (Germany) Norick Blödorn 5.92
- (England) Connor Mountain 4.95
- (Finland) Antti Vuolas 4.83
- (Australia) Connor Bailey (Rising Star) 3.79
- (England) Jake Mulford (Rising Star) 2.67

=== Birmingham Brummies ===
- (Sweden) Fredrik Lindgren 8.91
- (England) Tom Brennan 7.39
- (Australia) Justin Sedgmen 6.79
- (Australia) Zach Cook 6.65
- (England) Steve Worrall (C) 5.90
- (Poland) Piotr Pawlicki 5.44
- (Poland) Wiktor Lampart 5.27
- (Denmark) Michael Palm Toft 4.74
- (Czech Republic) Václav Milík 4.57
- (England) Leon Flint (Rising Star) 4.35

=== Ipswich Witches ===
- (Australia) Jason Doyle 9.94
- (Russia) / (Poland) Emil Sayfutdinov 9.50
- (England) Adam Ellis 6.92
- (England) Danny King (C) 6.46
- (Australia) Keynan Rew 6.43
- (England) Dan Thompson (Rising Star) 5.34
- (England) Jordan Jenkins 4.71

=== King's Lynn Stars ===
- (Denmark) Niels Kristian Iversen 7.33
- (Poland) Tobiasz Musielak 7.30
- (Denmark) Benjamin Basso 7.16
- (Denmark) Nicolai Klindt 7.14
- (Czech Republic) Jan Kvěch 7.05
- (England) Lewis Kerr 6.40
- (Russia) / (Poland) Vadim Tarasenko 6.15
- (England) Anders Rowe (Rising Star) 6.14
- (Poland) Patryk Wojdyło 5.30
- (Denmark) Michael Palm Toft 5.14

=== Leicester Lions ===
- (Australia) Max Fricke (C) 9.18
- (England) Richard Lawson 7.97
- (Australia) Sam Masters 7.85
- (Australia) Ryan Douglas 7.66
- (United States) Luke Becker 7.19
- (England) Craig Cook 5.71
- (England) Drew Kemp 4.67
- (England) Sam Hagon (Rising Star) 2.54
- (England) Joe Thompson (Rising Star) 2.07

=== Oxford Spires ===
- (Australia) Rohan Tungate 8.00
- (Poland) Maciej Janowski 7.93
- (England) Charles Wright 7.67
- (England) Chris Harris (C) 7.02
- (Germany) Erik Riss 6.25
- (Australia) Luke Killeen 3.83
- (England) Ashton Boughen (Rising Star) 3.13

=== Sheffield Tigers ===
- (Australia) Jack Holder 9.48
- (England) Tai Woffinden 9.35
- (Australia) Chris Holder 8.92
- (Australia) Josh Pickering 7.50
- (England) Kyle Howarth (C) 6.00
- (England) Jason Edwards 4.00
- (England) Dan Gilkes (Rising Star) 3.70

== See also ==
- SGB Championship 2024
- 2024 National Development League speedway season
- British Speedway League Champions
