= SGB Premiership 2025 =

90th season of British Speedway

- League: Premiership
- No. of competitors: 7
- Champions: Ipswich Witches
- Knockout Cup: Leicester Lions
- Highest average: Max Fricke
- Division/s below: SGB Championship; NDL 2025

The 2025 SGB ROWE Motor Oil Premiership was the 90th season of the top tier of British speedway and the 8th known as the SGB Premiership.

Belle Vue Aces were the defending champions, while Sheffield Tigers were the defending Knockout Cup champions.

Locations of the 2025 SGB Premiership teams

== Summary ==
The league consisted of the same seven teams as in 2024, with Oxford again racing in all three professional leagues. The points limit remained at 40 points, with each side featuring a rising star.

The Birmingham Brummies raced one final season at Perry Barr Stadium, which was going to be demolished by West Midlands developer Corbally Group for housing. The last home meeting was 25 August with a final away match on 28 August.

Leicester Lions defeated King's Lynn to win the Knockout Cup (tier 1) for the first time in their history.

Ipswich Witches ended their 27-year wait for a title by defeating Leicester Lions in the Grand Final to be declared 2025 Champions. The Witches had beaten Belle Vue Aces in the playoff semi-finals, while the Lions beat regular season table toppers Sheffield Tigers.

Australian Max Fricke finished the season with the highest average across all competitions, ending with 10.19.

== League ==
=== Regular season ===
League table

Pos.	Club	M	Home			Away			F	A	B	Pts	+/−
Pos.	Club	M	W	SHL	L	W	SHL	L	F	A	B	Pts	+/−
1	Sheffield Tigers **(Q)**	24	11	0	1	6	0	6	1184	975	9	43	+209
2	Ipswich Witches **(Q)**	24	10	0	2	6	0	6	1156	1004	11	43	+152
3	Leicester Lions **(Q)**	24	10	0	2	7	0	5	1156	1003	8	42	+153
4	Belle Vue Aces **(Q)**	24	11	1	0	4	0	8	1124	1036	6	37	+88
5	King's Lynn Stars	24	9	0	3	3	0	9	1083	1076	6	30	+7
6	Oxford Spires	24	2	1	9	2	0	10	944	1215	2	11	-271
7	Birmingham Brummies	24	2	0	10	1	0	11	910	1248	0	6	-338

A fixtures

Home \ Away	BEL	BIR	IPS	KLN	LEI	OXF	SHF
Belle Vue		60–30	52–38	57–33	52–38	53–37	46–44
Birmingham	47–43		43–47	49–41	40–50	43–47	33–57
Ipswich	56–34	60–30		53–37	43–47	65–25	46–44
King's Lynn	44–46	49–40	51–39		46–44	59–31	42–48
Leicester	46–44	44–45	41–49	52–38		54–36	56–34
Oxford	38–52	49–41	42–48	38–52	41–49		45–45
Sheffield	57–33	61–29	46–44	57–33	42–48	57–33	

Legend: Blue = home team win; Yellow = draw; Red = away team win.

B fixtures

Home \ Away	BEL	BIR	IPS	KLN	LEI	OXF	SHF
Belle Vue		58–32	45–45	48–42	50–40	58–32	54–36
Birmingham	42–48		41–49	43–47	32–58	43–47	31–59
Ipswich	52–38	56–34		51–39	54–36	54–36	43–47
King's Lynn	50–40	53–37	46–44		36–54	63–27	47–43
Leicester	60–30	53–37	49–41	53–37		50–40	48–42
Oxford	42–48	62–28	44–46	35–55	44–46		43–46
Sheffield	55–35	50–40	57–33	47–43	50–40	60–30	

Legend: Blue = home team win; Yellow = draw; Red = away team win.

=== Play Offs ===
**Semi Finals**
1	**Ipswich Witches**	42	**59**	101
4	Belle Vue Aces	**48**	31	79
3	**Leicester Lions**	43	**47**	90
2	Sheffield Tigers	**46**	43	89

**Grand Final**
**Ipswich Witches**	47	**46**	93
Leicester Lions	**43**	43	86

Home team scores are in bold
Overall aggregate scores are in red

=== Final ===
First Leg

6 October

Leicester Lions; Max Fricke 12; Ryan Douglas 11; Sam Masters 7 Luke Becker 5 Kyle Howarth 5 Drew Kemp 3 Joe Thompson 0	43–47	Ipswich Witches; Emil Sayfutdinov 11; Tom Brennan 9 Jason Doyle 8 Dan Thompson 8 Jason Edwards 6 Danny King 5 Adam Ellis 0	Beaumont Park; Referee(s): Graeme Hunter

Second Leg

9 October

Ipswich Witches; Jason Doyle 10; Emil Sayfutdinov 9 Tom Brennan 7 Keynan Rew (guest) 7 Danny King 6 Dan Thompson 5 Jason Edwards 2	46–43	Leicester Lions; Max Fricke 13; Ryan Douglas 9 Sam Masters 7 Luke Becker 5 Drew Kemp 5 Kyle Howarth 4 Joe Thompson 0	Foxhall Stadium; Referee(s): Seth Perkin

== Knockout Cup ==
The 2025 Knockout Cup was the 80th edition of the Knockout Cup for tier one teams. Championship winners Poole declined an invite to enter the competition.

Bracket

**Quarter Finals**
Birmingham Brummies	**33**	44	77
**Leicester Lions**	57	**46**	103
Bye
**Sheffield Tigers**
**King's Lynn Stars**	**53**	53	106
Oxford Spires	37	**37**	74
Belle Vue Aces	**40**	23	63
**Ipswich Witches**	50	**67**	117

**Semi Finals**
**Leicester Lions**	**54**	46	100
Sheffield Tigers	36	**44**	80
**King's Lynn Stars**	**48**	45	93
Ipswich Witches	42	**45**	87

**Final**
**Leicester Lions**	45	**60**	105
King's Lynn Stars	**45**	30	75

Home team scores are in bold, with overall aggregate scores noted in red

=== Final ===
First Leg

28 July

King's Lynn Stars; Nicolai Klindt 14; Jan Kvěch 11; Richard Lawson 10; Chris Harris 4 Luek Harrison 2 Niels Kristian Iversen 2 Lewis Kerr (guest) 2	45–45	Leicester Lions; Tom Brennan (guest) 12; Max Fricke 9 Sam Masters 8 Ryan Douglas 8 Kyle Howarth 5 Joe Thompson 3 Drew Kemp 0	Adrian Flux Arena; Referee(s): Seth Perkin

Second Leg

31 July

Leicester Lions; Ryan Douglas 14; Sam Masters 12; Max Fricke 10; Tom Brennan (guest) 9 Drew Kemp 8 Kyle Howarth 5 Joe Thompson 2	60–30	King's Lynn Stars; Nicolai Klindt 11; Chris Harris 8 Richard Lawson 5 Jan Kvěch 2 Luke Harrison 2 Scott Nicholls (guest) 1 Niels Kristian Iversen 1	Beaumont Park; Referee(s): Chris Durno

== Leading averages ==
	Rider	Team	Average
1	(Australia) Max Fricke	Leicester	10.19
2	(Australia) Jack Holder	Sheffield	9.52
3	(England) Dan Bewley	Belle Vue	9.28
4	(Australia) Brady Kurtz	Belle Vue	9.11
5	(Russia) Emil Sayfutdinov	Ipswich	8.74
6	(Australia) Jason Doyle	Ipswich	8.61
7	(Australia) Ryan Douglas	Leicester	8.43
8	(Australia) Josh Pickering	Sheffield	8.28
9	(Australia) Sam Masters	Leicester	7.93
10	(England) Chris Harris	King's Lynn	7.83

- averages include league, play offs & knockout cup, min 6 matches

== Squads and final averages ==
Averages include 2025 Premiership and Knockout Cup matches.

=== Belle Vue Aces ===
- (England) Dan Bewley 9.28
- (Australia) Brady Kurtz 9.11
- (Australia) Jaimon Lidsey 7.80
- (Australia) Zach Cook 6.59
- (Germany) Norick Blödorn 5.09
- (England) Jake Mulford (Rising Star) 3.96
- (Australia) Tate Zischke 3.07

=== Birmingham Brummies ===
- (Denmark) Michael Jepsen Jensen 7.18
- (Poland) Tobiasz Musielak 6.89
- (Australia) Keynan Rew 6.87
- (Slovenia) Matej Žagar 6.83
- (England) Jason Edwards (Rising Star) 5.33
- (Denmark) Jonas Jeppesen 4.80
- (England) Ben Barker 4.71
- (Italy) Michele Paco Castagna 4.57
- (England) Danyon Hume 4.00
- (England) Sam Hagon (Rising Star) 2.97
- (Finland) Antti Vuolas 2.91

=== Ipswich Witches ===
- (Russia) / (Poland) Emil Sayfutdinov 8.74
- (Australia) Jason Doyle 8.61
- (England) Tom Brennan 7.70
- (England) Danny King (capt) 7.50
- (England) Dan Thompson 6.98
- (England) Adam Ellis 6.66
- (England) Jordan Jenkins (Rising Star) 5.72
- (England) Jason Edwards (Rising Star) 4.77

=== King's Lynn Stars ===
- (England) Chris Harris 7.83
- (Czech Republic) Jan Kvěch 7.71
- (England) Richard Lawson 7.56
- (Denmark) Niels Kristian Iversen 7.15
- (Denmark) Nicolai Klindt 6.91
- (Australia) Ben Cook 6.31
- (England) Ashton Boughen (Rising Star) 2.74
- (England) Luke Harrison (Rising Star) 2.69

=== Leicester Lions ===
- (Australia) Max Fricke 10.19
- (Australia) Ryan Douglas 8.43
- (Australia) Sam Masters 7.93
- (United States) Luke Becker 7.21
- (England) Kyle Howarth 6.54
- (England) Drew Kemp 5.41
- (England) Dan Gilkes (Rising Star) 4.00
- (England) Sam Hagon (Rising Star) 3.29
- (England) Joe Thompson (Rising Star) 2.65

=== Oxford Spires ===
- (Germany) Erik Riss 7.48
- (England) Craig Cook 7.43
- (England) Charles Wright 6.89
- (Poland) Maciej Janowski 6.48
- (Australia) Rohan Tungate 6.42
- (Denmark) Peter Kildemand 5.98
- (Latvia) Francis Gusts 4.00
- (Australia) Luke Killeen (Rising Star) 2.96
- (Sweden) Victor Palovaara 2.93

=== Sheffield Tigers ===
- (Australia) Jack Holder 9.52
- (Australia) Josh Pickering 8.28
- (Australia) Chris Holder 7.75
- (England) Leon Flint (Rising Star) 6.92
- (England) Anders Rowe 6.91
- (Australia) Nick Morris 6.63
- (England) Lewis Kerr 5.94
- (Australia) Justin Sedgmen 4.97
- (Australia) Jye Etheridge 4.00
- (England) Danyon Hume 1.14

== See also ==
- SGB Championship 2025
- 2025 National Development League and National Trophy speedway season
- British Speedway League Champions
