= SGB Premiership Knockout Cup =

British sppedway competition

- Formerly: Elite League Knockout Cup
- Sport: Speedway
- Founded: 2017
- Divisions: (Div 2) Championship KO Cup (Div 3) NDL KO Cup
- Country: United Kingdom
- Most recent champion: Leicester Lions

The SGB Premiership Knockout Cup is a speedway Knockout Cup competition in the United Kingdom for tier one teams. In 2019, the KO Cup was branded as the SGB Supporters Cup.

The event was not held in 2020, 2021 or 2022.

== History ==
It was renamed the SGB Premiership Knockout Cup in 2017, after formerly being called the Elite League Knockout Cup until 2012 and it was not held from 2013 to 2016.

== Past winners ==
| Year | Winners | Runners-up | Ref |
|---|---|---|---|
| 2017 | Belle Vue Aces | Wolverhampton Wolves | |
| 2018 | Somerset Rebels | King's Lynn Stars | |
| 2019 | Swindon Robins | Belle Vue Aces | |
Cancelled due to the COVID-19 pandemic
2021 & 2022 not held
| 2023 | Ipswich Witches | Sheffield Tigers | |
| 2024 | Sheffield Tigers | Ipswich Witches | |
| 2025 | Leicester Lions | King's Lynn Stars | |

== See also ==
- Knockout Cup (speedway) for full list of winners and competitions
