= Middlesbrough Tigers =

Middlesbrough Tigers may refer to one of the following:

- Former motorcycle speedway team called Middlesbrough Bears, known as Middlesbrough Tigers from 1979 to 1988
- Current motorcycle speedway junior team known as Middlesbrough Tigers, who are the junior team of the Redcar Bears
