= Kasper Andersen (speedway rider) =

Danish speedway rider (born 1998)

- Born: 22 August 1998 (age 28); Bramming, Denmark
- Nationality: Danish

Career history

Denmark
- 2016: Munkebo
- 2017, 2021: Esbjerg
- 2018–2019: Grindsted
- 2022–2023: Fjelsted

Great Britain
- 2018-2019: King's Lynn Stars
- 2018-2019: Sheffield Tigers
- 2019, 2022: Redcar Bears
- 2021: Berwick Bandits
- 2021: King's Lynn Stars

Kasper Andersen (born 22 August 1998) is a Danish speedway rider.

== Career ==
Andersen rode in the top tier of British Speedway, riding for the King's Lynn Stars in the SGB Premiership 2019. He was unable to race for the Redcar Bears in the SGB Championship 2021 following difficulties over a permit. In a twist of fate however, Andersen was drafted in as a replacement for Coty Garcia at Berwick Bandits, who was stranded in his homeland Argentina since the start of the season due to travel restrictions.

In August 2021, Andersen then signed for SGB Premiership team Kings Lynn Stars. In 2022, he rode for the Redcar Bears in the SGB Championship 2022.
