= Luke Killeen =

British-Australian speedway rider (born 2005)

- Born: 16 April 2005 (age 21); Perth, Australia
- Nationality: British/Australian

Career history
- 2022–2026: Oxford Cheetahs
- 2024-2025: Oxford Spires
- 2022-2024: Oxford Chargers

Individual honours
- 2024: Western Australia champion

Team honours
- 2023: NDL champions

Luke Killeen (born 16 April 2005) is an Australian born British speedway rider. He currently rides in the first and second tiers of British Speedway, for the Oxford Cheetahs in the SGB Championship and as the 'Rising Star' for the Sheffield Tigers in the SGB Premiership

== Speedway career ==
Killeen came to prominence when he won the Australian 125cc national title in 2020. For the 2022 season, he signed for the newly reformed Oxford Speedway National Development League team called the Oxford Chargers. After a four month delay with passport issues, he made his debut.

In 2023, Killeen moved up to ride for the Oxford Cheetahs senior team for the SGB Championship 2023. He also remained with the Chargers for the 2023 NDL season, where he won the NDL league title with Oxford, defeating Leicester in a one-off Grand Final. In November 2023, he won the Western Australia championship at Pinjar Park Speedway.

Killeen rode again for Oxford in the 2024 season in all three of Oxford's teams, starting the season with the Oxford Cheetahs in the SGB Championship, while also captaining the Oxford Chargers in the National Development League, then being signed for the Oxford Spires in the SGB Premiership in July 2024. In November 2024, he was runner-up in the Western Australian Championship, finishing second behind the youngest ever winner, Mitchell McDiarmid.

For the 2025 season, Killeen has signed for the Oxford Spires, in the SGB Premiership, and the Oxford Cheetahs, in the SGB Championship.
