= Ben Cook (speedway rider) =

Australian speedway rider

- Born: 27 October 1997 (age 29); Cowra, New South Wales, Australia
- Nationality: Australian

Career history

Great Britain
- 2020–2024: Poole
- 2023: Peterborough
- 2024: Belle Vue
- 2025: King's Lynn

Poland
- 2024–2026: Leszno

Sweden
- 2025: Smederna

Team honours
- 2024: British champions
- 2021, 2022, 2024: tier 2 champions
- 2021, 2022, 2024: tier 2 KO Cup winners

Benjamin Cook (born 27 October 1997) is a speedway rider from Australia.

== Speedway career ==
Cook, placed fifth in the FIM Oceania Championship before signing for Poole Pirates during the SGB Championship 2020 season. However the season was cancelled but he retained his place for the SGB Championship 2021 season, which resulted in a highly successful season for the Pirates as they won the league and Knockout Cup double.

In 2022, Cook rode for the Poole Pirates again in the SGB Championship 2022. His form improved significantly and he was instrumental in helping Poole retain their League and knockout cup double crown. In 2023, he re-signed for Poole for the SGB Championship 2023 and signed for Peterborough Panthers for the SGB Premiership 2023.

In 2024, Cook was made club captain at Poole and following the demise of Peterborough joined the Belle Vue Aces for their title winning 2024 Premiership season. He experienced double success by also winning the 2024 Championship league title and knockout cup with Poole.

Cook signed for King's Lynn Stars for the SGB Premiership 2025.

== Personal life ==
Cook's brother is fellow professional rider Zach Cook.
