= Daniel Giffard =

British speedway rider

- Born: 10 November 1984 (age 42); Eastbourne, England
- Nationality: British (English)

Career history
- 2000–2003: Rye House Raiders
- 2002: Isle of Wight Islanders
- 2003: Wimbledon Dons
- 2004–2005: Weymouth Wildcats
- 2003-–2004: Stoke Potters
- 2005: Hull Vikings
- 2006–2008: Redcar Bears

Team honours
- 2007: Young Shield Winner

Daniel James Giffard (born 10 November 1984) in Eastbourne, East Sussex, is a former motorcycle speedway rider from England.

== Career ==
Giffard rode with the Redcar Bears in the Premier League and represented Great Britain at Under-21 level.

Giffard retired from speedway in 2009 and earned a benefit meeting at Redcar.
