= Paul Starke =

British motorcycle speedway rider

- Born: 18 November 1990 (age 36); Hereford, Herefordshire, England
- Nationality: British (English)

Career history
- 2007: Buxton
- 2008–2010, 2023: Plymouth
- 2010: Rye House
- 2010–2012: Isle of Wight
- 2013: Berwick
- 2013–2014: Cradley
- 2014: Birmingham
- 2014–2017: Somerset
- 2015, 2017, 2025: Poole
- 2016: Leicester
- 2017: Peterborough
- 2018–2019, 2024: Glasgow
- 2018: Belle Vue
- 2020–2021: Kent
- 2022: Newcastle
- 2022: Ipswich
- 2022: Oxford
- 2024: Workington

Team honours
- 2013, 2014: Speedway National League
- 2015: Elite League
- 2013, 2014: National League Fours
- 2017: SGB Championship Fours

Paul Simon Starke (born 18 November 1990) is a motorcycle speedway rider from England.

== Career ==
Born in Hereford, Starke started his career with the Buxton Hitmen in 2007, before going on to have spells at a variety of different clubs during his development into an Elite League rider. Starke's most successful period to date was his two years with the Cradley Heathens in the National League from 2013 to 2014. It was here that he won two league titles, forming a formidable partnership with Steve Worrall during the second year and he was part of the Dudley/Cradley team that won the National League Fours in 2013 and 2014.

His first spell in the Elite League in 2014, was a disappointing one. After being selected by the Birmingham Brummies in the reserve rider draft the club closed midway through the season due to financial problems. Despite this disappointment Starke said he 'enjoyed his time at Birmingham' and described their downfall as a "crying shame."

The following season in 2015, Starke was back in the Elite League, this time being selected in the draft by reigning champions the Poole Pirates.

He was part of the Peterborough Panthers team that won the SGB Championship Fours, which was held on 6 August 2017, at the East of England Arena.

He spent two years with Glasgow Tigers in 2018 and 2019 and had a short spell with Belle Vue Aces in the SGB Premiership 2018.

In 2021, he signed for the Ipswich Witches in the SGB Premiership and Kent Kings in the SGB Championship. The following season in 2022, he raced again for Ipswich and joined Newcastle Diamonds from Kent but following the demise of Newcastle he switched to the Oxford Cheetahs for the SGB Championship 2022 season. The Cheetahs were returning to action after a 14-year absence from British Speedway.

In 2023, he signed for Plymouth Gladiators for the SGB Championship 2023. He had previously ridden for the Plymouth when they were known as the Devils from 2008 to 2010. However, he was released by the club in June. The following season he re-signed for Glasgow for the 2024 season but was released in July but re-joined defending champions for champions Poole for the SGB Championship 2025.
