= Redcar Bears =

British motorcycle speedway team

Club information
- Track address: Ecco Arena; Dormor Way; Southbank Road; Middlesbrough; TS6 6XH
- Country: England
- Founded: 2006
- Promoter: Leanne Swales, Jamie Swales and Keith Miller
- Team manager: Gavin Parr
- Team captain: Charles Wright
- League: SGB Championship; National Development League
- Website: www.redcar-speedway.com

Club facts
- Colours: Red, White, Black and Grey
- Track size: 271 metres (296 yd)
- Track record time: 52.6 seconds
- Track record date: 11 August 2023
- Track record holder: Connor Bailey

Current senior team
Rider	CMA
(England) Charles Wright (capt)
(England) Jason Edwards
(England) Simon Lambert
(Scotland) Ace Pijper
(Australia) Jake Allen
(England) Jake Mulford
(England) Jody Scott

Current junior team
Rider	CMA
(Scotland) Ace Pijper
(Scotland) Stene Pijper
(England) Nathan Ablitt
(England) Kai Ward
(England) Ben Trigger
(England) Harry Sadler
(England) Charlie Southwick

Major team honours
SGB Championship KO Cup	2019
Young Shield Winners	2007
Pairs	2022, 2024, 2025
BSN Series	2025

The Redcar Bears are a British motorcycle speedway team who compete in the SGB Championship (second tier of the British speedway leagues). The club was founded in 2006. Their major team honours to date are the SGB Championship Knockout Cup win in 2019 and the British Speedway Network (BSN) Series win in 2025. The team have also run a junior side called the Middlesbrough Tigers (which is not to be confused with the former Middlesbrough club).

== History ==
=== Origins and 2000s ===
Speedway in Middlesbrough began at the Cleveland Park Stadium and with a Middlesbrough team (later the Bears) that first competed in the 1929 Speedway English Dirt Track League. The racing took place from 1929 until 1996, when the Cleveland Park Stadium was demolished.

It was not until 2006 that speedway returned to Middlesbrough, with a new team name by the name of Redcar Bears, racing at the purpose built South Tees Motorsports Park (a former quad bike practice area). The team were promoted by Chris Van Straaten and Gareth Rogers, managed by Brian Havelock and captained by his son Gary Havelock (the 1992 world champion) and entered the 2006 Premier League speedway season, the Premier League was division 2 at the time. The Bears raced their first home fixture on 13 April 2006 against Sheffield Tigers and finished the season in a solid sixth place.

In 2007, the Bears won the Premier League consolation tournament known as the Young Shield, beating the Birmingham Brummies.

=== 2010s ===
From 2010 to 2016, the team continued to compete in the Premier League but experienced season of mediocrity. In 2017, the team joined the SGB Championship (the new name for division 2) and finished in 5th place. The Bears were awarded the 2017 Championship Track of the Year by the Speedway Control Board, an award voted for throughout the season based on referee's match reports.

In 2019, Jitendra Duffill became co-promoter replacing Kevin Keay, with Jade Mudgway continuing as the team manager and co-promoter. Gary Havelock also re-joined the club as the rider's coach. Race nights switched to Friday from Thursday and the club were branded as the Redcar Agilia Bears after London based company Agilia Infrastructure Partners Limited became the club's main sponsor. During the 2019 season, the Bears long-awaited search for major silverware ended when they beat Newcastle Diamonds in the Championship Knockout Cup final. Additionally Bears' rider Charles Wright became the 2019 British Speedway Champion after winning the final at the National Speedway Stadium in Manchester and Erik Riss won his first Championship Riders' title at Sheffield.

=== 2020s ===
For the 2020 season the Bears retained five of the previous years team but the season was cancelled due to the COVID-19.

The 2021 season saw the Bears lose their reign as Knockout Cup holders in preliminary round defeat to the Birmingham Brummies and despite qualifying for the end of season play-offs, were beaten in the quarter-finals by the Edinburgh Monarchs. In 2022, the South Tees Motorsports Park became the ECCO Arena, after long-time sponsor ECCO Finishing Supplies took up the opportunity to take over the stadium naming rights.

The first silverware of the SGB Championship 2022 went to the Redcar pairing of Charles Wright and Lewis Kerr, who lifted the SGB Championship 2022 Pairs Championship held at Oxford on 12 August. Also in August, Katie Gordon who rode for the Redcar Cubs, won the inaugural NORA Women's British Championship. The following year in 2023, Charles Wright won the Riders' Championship at the Ecco Arena.

In 2024, the Bears won the Pairs Championship with Charles Wright and Danny King and the following season repeated the success, with Wright and Erik Riss.

A successful season in 2025 concluded with the Redcar Bears winning the British Speedway Network (BSN) Series in the final against Poole Pirates 91-89 on aggregate.

== Season summary ==
Extended content

Year and league	Position	Notes
2006 Premier League speedway season	6th	
2007 Premier League speedway season	9th	Young Shield
2008 Premier League speedway season	7th	
2008 Speedway Conference League	3rd	Redcar Cubs
2009 Premier League speedway season	5th	
2010 Premier League speedway season	14th	
2011 Premier League speedway season	10th	
2012 Premier League speedway season	9th	
2013 Premier League speedway season	6th	
2014 Premier League speedway season	10th	
2015 Premier League speedway season	13th	
2016 Premier League speedway season	13th	
SGB Championship 2017	5th	
SGB Championship 2018	10th	
SGB Championship 2019	3rd	Play offs
SGB Championship 2021	4th	
SGB Championship 2022	6th	Play offs, pairs winners
SGB Championship 2023	5th	Play offs
SGB Championship 2024	6th	Pairs winners
SGB Championship 2025	3rd	Pairs winners / BSN Series winners

== Season summary (junior team) ==
Extended content

Year and league	Position	Notes
2024 National Development League speedway season	6th	Middlesbrough Tigers
2025 National Development League and National Trophy speedway season	tbc	Middlesbrough Tigers

== Notable riders ==
- (France) Dimitri Bergé
- (England) Gary Havelock
- (England) Lewis Kerr
- (England) Danny King
- (Germany) Erik Riss
- (France) Mathieu Trésarrieu
- (England) Charles Wright

=== Previous seasons ===
Extended content

2006 Team

- (England) Gary Havelock
- (Scotland) Kevin Little
- (France) Mathieu Trésarrieu
- (United States) Chris Kerr
- (England) Daniel Giffard
- (England) Jack Hargreaves
- (Denmark) Richard Juul
- (Czech Republic) Tomáš Suchánek2007 Team
- (England) Gary Havelock
- (Scotland) James Grieves
- (France) Mathieu Trésarrieu
- (United States) Chris Kerr
- (England) Daniel Giffard
- (England) Jamie Courtney
- (England) Rusty Hodgson
- (England) Josh Auty

Also Rode:

- (Germany) Robbie Kessler
- (England) Jack Hargreaves

2008 Team

- (England) Gary Havelock
- (Scotland) James Grieves
- (Australia) Ty Proctor
- (United States) Chris Kerr
- (England) Daniel Giffard
- (Australia) Arlo Bugeja
- (England) Josh Auty

Also Rode:

- (Finland) Joni Keskinen

2009 Team

- (England) Gary Havelock
- (Australia) Ty Proctor
- (England) Carl Stonehewer
- (England) Ben Wilson
- (Germany) Robbie Kessler
- (England) Benji Compton
- (Australia) Arlo Bugeja

2010 Team=

- (England) Gary Havelock
- (England) Joe Haines
- (Scotland) James Grieves
- (Argentina) Emiliano Sanchez
- (England) Charles Wright
- (Denmark) Peter Juul Larsen
- (Czech Republic) Tomas Suchanek

2011 Team

- (Australia) Jason Lyons
- (Denmark) Peter Juul
- (Czech Republic) Matěj Kůs
- (England) Gary Havelock
- (Australia) Aaron Summers
- (England) Adam Roynon
- (Australia) Robert Branford

2012 Team

- (Denmark) Ulrich Ostergaard
- (Czech Republic) Matěj Kůs
- (England) Carl Wilkinson - No.3 was previously Gary Havelock but Wilkinson signed due to Havelock's injury.
- (Australia) Justin Sedgmen
- (Australia) Aaron Summers
- (Germany) Max Dilger
- (England) Mark Jones - Replaced Robert Branford

2013 Team

- (Denmark) Ulrich Ostergaard
- (Czech Republic) Matěj Kůs
- (England) Carl Wilkinson
- (Australia) Hugh Skidmore
- (Australia) Aaron Summers
- (Germany) Max Dilger
- (England) Mickey Dyer

2014 Team

- (England) Richard Lawson
- (Australia) Mark Lemon
- (England) Carl Wilkinson
- (Australia) Hugh Skidmore
- (Australia) Aaron Summers
- (Denmark) Jan Graversen
- (Poland) Rafal Konopka

Also Rode:

- (England) Luke Crang
- (England) Richard Hall

2015 Team

- (Denmark) Lasse Bjerre
- (Czech Republic) Matěj Kůs
- (Australia) Hugh Skidmore
- (England) Stuart Robson
- (Denmark) Jonas B Andersen
- (France) Dimitri Bergé
- (Denmark) Jan Graversen

Also Rode:

- (England) Adam Roynon
- (Poland) Rafal Konopka
- (England) Ben Morley

2016 Team

- (Denmark) Lasse Bjerre
- (Germany) Tobias Busch
- (Australia) Hugh Skidmore
- (France) David Bellego
- (Denmark) Jonas B Andersen
- (England) Lee Payne
- (Australia) Jye Etheridge

Also Rode:

- (Denmark) Jacob Bukhave
- (Denmark) Simon Nielsen

2017 Team

- (England) Jason Garrity
- (England) Ben Barker
- (England) Charles Wright
- (Denmark) Jonas B Andersen
- (Germany) Tobias Busch
- (England) Danny Ayres
- (England) Ellis Perks

Also Rode:

- (Argentina) Coty Garcia

Replaced Tobias Busch on a 28-day loan period.

- (England) Richard Hall

Replaced by Danny Ayres 17 May 2017.

2017 Competitions & Results

2018 Team

- (England) Ben Barker
- (Denmark) Thomas Jørgensen
- (France) Dimitri Bergé
- (Denmark) Jonas B Andersen
- (Denmark) Mikkel B Andersen
- (Australia) Jordan Stewart
- (Finland) Nike Lunna

Also rode:

- (Netherlands) Theo Pijper - Replaced 31 May 2018 by Thomas Jørgensen
- (Czech Republic) Matěj Kůs - Replaced 3 June 2018 by Dimitri Bergé
- (England) Nathan Greaves - On a 28-day contract replacing Tobias Busch 3 June 2018 – 5 July 2018
- (Germany) Tobias Busch - Replaced 9 August 2018 by Nike Lunna

Jade Mudgway deputised for Team Manager Jitendra Duffill.

2018 Competitions & Results

2019 Team

- (Germany) Erik Riss (2019 Championship Riders Champion)
- (Denmark) Kasper Andersen
- (Australia) Jordan Stewart
- (England) Charles Wright (2019 British Speedway Champion)
- (Denmark) Michael Palm Toft
- (England) Nathan Greaves
- (England) Tom Woolley

Also Rode:

- (England) Ben Barker replaced 4/6/19 by Ulrich Ostergaard
- (Denmark) Ulrich Ostergaard replaced by Erik Riss 3/7/19
- (England) Tom Bacon replaced by Kasper Andersen 3/7/19
- (England) Jack Smith replaced by Tom Woolley 3/7/19

3 July 2019 changes

2019 Competitions & Results

2020 Team

- (England) Charles Wright
- (Germany) Erik Riss
- (Denmark) Michael Palm Toft
- (Australia) Jordan Stewart
- (Denmark) Kasper Andersen
- (England) Joe Lawlor
- (England) Jordan Jenkins

2021 Team

- (England) Charles Wright
- (Denmark) Michael Palm Toft
- (Australia) Jake Allen
- (Australia) Jordan Stewart
- (England) Anders Rowe
- (England) James Sarjeant
- (England) Jordan Jenkins

2022 Team

- (England) Charles Wright
- (Germany) Erik Riss
- (England) Lewis Kerr
- (Denmark) Kasper Andersen
- (England) Jordan Jenkins
- (England) Jason Edwards
- (England) Kyle Newman

Also Rode:

- (England) Adam Roynon

Replaced by Kyle Bickley 4/7/22.

- (England) Kyle Bickley

Replaced by Kyle Newman 11/8/22.

2023 Team

- (England) Charles Wright
- (Australia) Connor Bailey
- (Germany) Erik Riss
- (England) Danyon Hume
- (England) Danny King
- (England) Jason Edwards
- (England) Jake Mulford

2024 Team

- (England) Charles Wright
- (Australia) Connor Bailey
- (Denmark) Jonas Knudsen
- (England) Danny King
- (England) Jason Edwards
- (England) Jake Mulford
- (England) Ben Trigger

2025 Team

- (England) Charles Wright
- (Germany) Erik Riss
- (England) Danny King
- (England) Jason Edwards
- (England) Jake Mulford
- (Netherlands) Ace Pijper
- (England) Jody Scott

Also Rode:

- (England) Tom Spencer
