= Kyle Bickley =

British speedway rider

- Born: 27 February 2002 (age 24); Whitehaven, Cumbria, England
- Nationality: British (English)

Career history
- 2018: Workington Comets
- 2019: Belle Vue Colts
- 2019: Glasgow Tigers
- 2021–2022: Berwick Bandits
- 2021: Sheffield Tigers
- 2022: Redcar Bears
- 2023: Edinburgh Monarchs

Team honours
- 2018: League & Knockout Cup

Kyle Bickley (born 27 February 2002) is a speedway rider from England.

== Speedway career ==
Bickley has ridden in the top two tiers of British Speedway. During his debut season in 2018, he rode for Workington Comets, where he won the league and cup double. He captained the Belle Vue Colts during the 2019 National Development League speedway season and rode for Glasgow Tigers in the SGB Championship 2019.

In 2021, Bickley signed for the Berwick Bandits in the SGB Championship. In the SGB Championship 2022, he initially rode for Berwick before joining Newcastle Diamonds but following their collapse he moved to Redcar Bears. He also rode for Berwick Bullets during the 2022 National Development League speedway season.

In 2023, Bickley signed for Edinburgh Monarchs for the SGB Championship 2023 and would also captain their junior side in the NDL. He was later dropped by the first team.
