= Nathan Greaves =

British motorcycle speedway rider

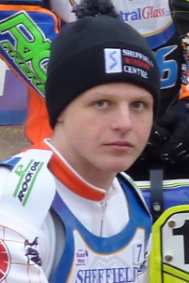
- Born: 24 February 1998 (age 28); Sheffield, England
- Nationality: British (English)

Career history
- 2013–2015: Dudley/Cradley Heathens
- 2014: Swindon Robins
- 2016: Sheffield Tigers
- 2016: King's Lynn Young Stars
- 2017–2018: Wolverhampton Wolves
- 2017: Ipswich Witches
- 2017: Isle of Wight Warriors
- 2018: Glasgow Tigers
- 2018–2019: Redcar Bears
- 2020–2021: Armadale Devils
- 2021: Edinburgh Monarchs

Team honours
- 2014: National League Fours

Nathan Robert Greaves (born 24 February 1998, Sheffield) is a former motorcycle speedway rider from England.

== Career ==
Greaves started his British speedway career for the Cradley Heathens in 2013. He raced with Swindon Robins as a fast track reserve in 2014 before joining Workington Comets for the 2014 Premier League speedway season. Also in 2014, he was part of the Cradley team that won the National League Fours, held on 26 October 2014 at Brandon Stadium.

After a season with the Sheffield Tigers in 2016, Greaves signed for Wolverhampton Wolves in the SGB Premiership 2017 and Ipswich Witches for the 2017 season. He also rode for Wolves during the 2018 season before moving to Redcar Bears in 2019.

Greaves' final season was with Edinburgh Monarchs in the SGB Championship and Armadale Devils in the National League during 2021. He retired after the season on 3 September 2021.

== Career honours ==
- 2011 250cc British Under 16s Champion
- 2012 250cc and 500cc British Under 16s Champion
- 2013 500cc British Under 16s Champion
- 2013 National League title winner (Cradley)
- 2013 National League Knockout Cup winner (Cradley)
- 2014 National League title winner (Cradley)
- 2014 National League Knockout Cup winner (Cradley)
- 2014 National League Fours winner (Cradley)
- 2018 3rd place British Under-21 Final
