= Ashton Boughen =

English speedway rider

- Born: 21 August 2007 (age 19); King's Lynn, Norfolk
- Nationality: British (English)

Career history
- 2023: Leicester
- 2023–2024: Oxford
- 2025: King's Lynn
- 2025: Glasgow

Ashton Boughen (born 21 August 2007) is an English motorcycle speedway rider.

== Career ==
Boughen started his career in Motocross and won the 65cc British title, while also representing Great Britain at the Junior World Championships. However, he switched to speedway in 2022 and made appearances for both the Oxford Chargers and Mildenhall Fen Tigers towards the end of the 2022 National Development League speedway season.

In 2023, Boughen completed his first full senior 500cc season in the British speedway leagues, representing Leicester Lion Cubs in the 2023 National Development League. In 2023, he also won the 500cc British Youth Championships and also finished in tenth place in the British Under 21 Championship. Later in the season, he would ride in matches for Oxford again.

Boughen re-signed for Oxford for the 2024 season, for both their Premiership and Championship teams. In June that year, he finished third in the British Under 21 Championship.

Boughen signed for King's Lynn Stars for the SGB Premiership 2025 and Glasgow Tigers for the SGB Championship 2025.
