= Kyle Newman (speedway rider) =

English speedway rider

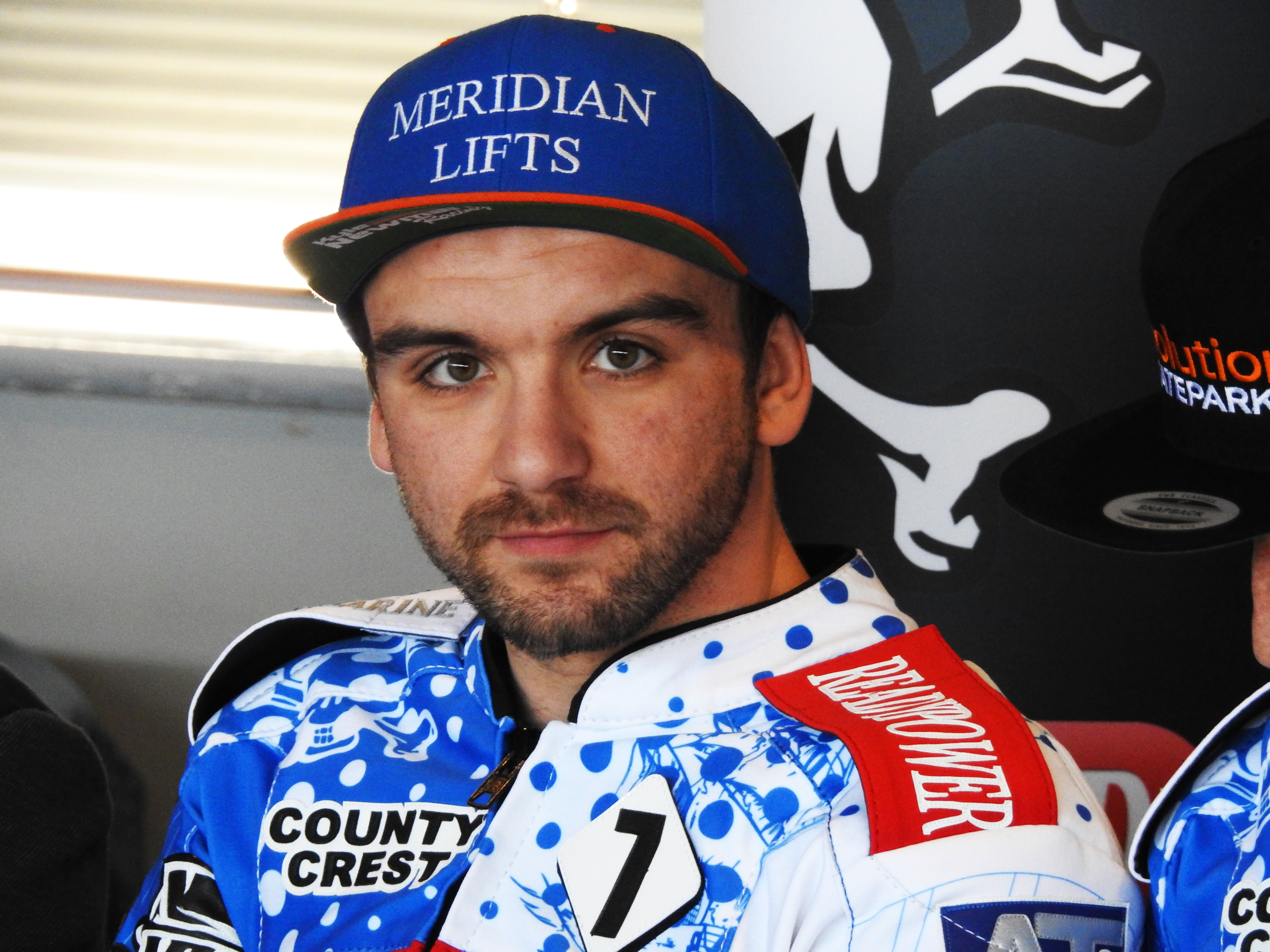
- Born: 14 December 1991 (age 34); Poole, Dorset
- Nationality: British (English)

Career history
- 2007–2008: Weymouth
- 2009: Bournemouth
- 2009-2010: Newport
- 2010, 2019: Birmingham
- 2011: Cradley
- 2011: Newcastle
- 2011, 2014–2017, 2023: Poole
- 2012–2013: Somerset
- 2012: Peterborough
- 2014–2016, 2024: Plymouth
- 2017: Ipswich
- 2017: Leicester
- 2018: Lakeside
- 2019–2021: Eastbourne
- 2022: Oxford
- 2022: Redcar

Individual honours
- 2010: Queensland U-21 State Champion

Team honours
- 2008: Conference League
- 2009: National League
- 2009: National League Knock-out Cup
- 2011, 2014, 2015: Elite League
- 2011: Premier Shield
- 2012: Premier League Cup
- 2013: Premier League
- 2013: Premier League Knock-out Cup
- 2014, 2015, 2016: Elite Shield
- 2016: Premier League Fours

Kyle Newman (born 14 December 1991) is an English motorcycle speedway rider.

== Career ==
Born in Poole, the son of former rider Keith Newman, he has ridden for a variety of clubs during a career that began in 2007. After having his first junior race at Somerset in July 2007 Newman was drafted into the Weymouth Wildcats Conference League team for a few meetings as an injury replacement rider, these showed the Weymouth promotion enough to earn him a full team place for 2008 where he quickly became a crowd favourite culminating in the fans voting him their rider of the year on the club's website poll.

Towards the end of the season, Newman made contact with former English racer Marcus Williams from Townsville, Australia, who was looking for a young English rider to sponsor to race in Australia that winter; here he also made contact with former rider Steve Koppe. Williams and Koppe and a team of people in Queensland helped develop Newman into the racer that he is today, also teaching him to maintain and tune his own engines.

For 2009, Newman was set to rejoin the Wildcats but upon his return to the UK the promotion blocked him from taking up a squad role with Newport Wasps in a higher league to help his development even though this would not affect his role at Weymouth. He was signed by the newly formed Bournemouth Buccaneers, where he improved considerably until a crash in the final month of the season saw him break his left femur badly resulting in having surgery to pin the leg. Unsure if Newman was going to be fit for the 2010 season the Buccaneers management decided to release Newman and he was signed by Newport for their National League team. Halfway through the season, Newman had his first international meeting at Goričan, Croatia in a world Under-21 qualifier, just missing out on qualifying in a run off for sixth place, but this event earned him a place for the rest of the season with the Birmingham Brummies Premier League team.

After winning the Under-21 Queensland State title, and coming fourth in the final round of the Australian national titles Newman returned in 2011 as a squad member for his parent and hometown club Poole Pirates in the Elite League and also signed for Premier League club Newcastle Diamonds. It was at Newcastle in October where after being accidentally caught by another rider, as a result of the crash the handlebars punctured a main artery, and it is only due to the quick actions of the track's medical staff and major surgery that night at Newcastle hospital that Newman's life was saved and he has been able to carry on with his career, winning cup and league titles with Premier league team Somerset Rebels in 2012 and 2013, guesting for Poole Pirates in the 2013 Elite league final helping them to the title and achieving his first Elite League race win at Birmingham, and in 2014 being part of the Pirates team that won the Elite title.

In 2014, he returned to the Pirates team after the introduction of 'fast track reserves' a system designed to aid the development of young British riders. It worked out well for Newman who was voted the Pirates rider of the year in a vote on the Bournemouth Echo website. He earned 60% of the vote, in second place Maciej Janowski earned 31% of the vote. After a successful season in 2014 Poole decided to bring Newman back into the team for 2015.

Individually, Newman has regularly competed in individual events in Europe and the UK, winning the Golden Hammer meeting at Wolverhampton in 2012, and twice winning the Belgian Gold Helmet in 2013 and 2014. Newman was also the first English rider to qualify for the European Under-21 final in 2012, a broken shoulder just days before the semi-final in Terenzano hampering his chance to qualify for the finals, and he finished in 11th place. Newman was given the wildcard at the GB round of the World Under-21 Championship at Coventry where he came joint fourth on 10 points which come the end of the season actually placed Newman 18th in the world from just one out of eight rounds. He rode in the Polish I Liga in 2015 (for Gniezno) and 2016 (for Piła).

He was part of the Plymouth team that won the Premier League Four-Team Championship, which was held on 23 and 24 July 2016, at the East of England Arena.

Newman was re-signed by Poole as vice captain until he was dropped during the 2017 season, subsequently being signed by Leicester Lions, and also raced for Ipswich Witches in 2017. For 2018 he signed with Lions in the SGB Premiership and Lakeside Hammers in the SGB Championship.

In December 2021, Newman signed for the Oxford Cheetahs for the SGB Championship 2022. The Cheetahs were returning to action after a 14-year absence from British Speedway. Newman struggled for form for the Cheetahs and later joined Redcar Bears mid-season.

In 2023, he returned to Poole for the SGB Championship 2023 and the following season he re-joined Plymouth for the 2024 season.

== Honours ==
=== Individual ===
- Weymouth Young Guns individual winner, 2009
- Graham Warren memorial trophy, Birmingham, 2010
- Queensland Under-21 State Champion, 2010
- Julian Barnett Memorial trophy, Newcastle, 2011
- Golden Hammer winner, Wolverhampton, 2012
- Belgium Gold Helmet winner, 2013, 2014
- Pinjar (Perth, Aus.) International champion, 2014

Club/fan awards

- Weymouth Wildcats fans rider of the year, 2008
- Bournemouth Buccaneers most exciting rider, 2009
- Plymouth Devils Rider of the year, 2014
- Poole Pirates Rider of the year, 2014

=== Team ===
- Conference League champions, 2008 (Weymouth Wildcats)
- National League champions, 2009 (Bournemouth Buccaneers)
- National League Knock-out Cup winners, 2009 (Bournemouth Buccaneers)
- Elite League champions, 2011, 2014, 2015 (Poole Pirates)
- Premier Shield winners, 2011 (Newcastle Diamonds)
- Premier League Cup winners, 2012 (Somerset Rebels)
- Premier League champions, 2013 (Somerset Rebels)
- Premier League Knock-out Cup winners, 2013 (Somerset Rebels)
- Elite Shield, 2014, 2015, 2016 (Poole Pirates)
- Premier League Fours, 2016, (Plymouth Devils)
