= South Tees Motorsports Park =

Motorcycle speedway stadium

ECCO Arena
- Location: South Tees Motorsports Park; Dormor Way; South Bank; Middlesbrough; TS6 6XH; England
- Coordinates: 54°34′31″N 1°11′36″W
- Opened: 2006
- Major events: Speedway

Oval

The South Tees Motorsports Park is a purpose-built complex for different motorsport disciplines located at South Bank, Middlesbrough, England. The Arena is the home track for the Redcar Bears and is currently known as the ECCO Arena because of the clubs primary sponsor ECCO Finishing Supplies.

== History ==
The speedway stadium opened on 13 April 2006. It was the first time since 1996 that Middlesbrough had hosted speedway following the closure of the Cleveland Park Stadium.

The stadium was formerly known as the Media Prime Arena until the beginning of the SGB Championship 2022 season, named after one of the clubs primary sponsors at the time Media Prima.

== See also ==
- Redcar Bears
