= Jack Smith (speedway rider) =

English speedway rider

- Born: 17 December 1998 (age 27); Stoke-on-Trent, Staffordshire, England
- Nationality: British (English)

Career history
- 2016: Birmingham
- 2017, 2021, 2023–2024: Glasgow
- 2017-2023: Belle Vue
- 2018: Sheffield
- 2018: Swindon
- 2018: Ipswich
- 2019: Redcar
- 2025: Berwick

Jack Andrew Smith (born 17 December 1998) is a motorcycle speedway rider from England.

== Career ==
Smith began his league career with Birmingham Brummies during the 2016 National League speedway season and helped the Brummies win the league title.

Smith rode in the top tier of British Speedway riding for the Swindon Robins in the SGB Premiership 2018. He rode for Glasgow Tigers in the SGB Championship 2021.

In 2023, Smith signed for Belle Vue Colts for the 2023 NDL season, it was his sixth consecutive season with the Colts. Smith signed a short-term contract with Berwick Bandits for the 2025 season.

== Family ==
Smith's father Andy was a speedway rider.
