= Charles Wright (speedway rider) =

British speedway rider (born 1988)

- Born: 26 October 1988 (age 38); Stockport, England
- Nationality: British (English)

Career history

Great Britain
- 2004–2007, 2010: Buxton Hitmen
- 2007–2009, 2011: Workington Comets
- 2010, 2017, 2019–2026: Redcar Bears
- 2011, 2018: Leicester Lions
- 2011: Belle Vue Colts
- 2012: Edinburgh Monarchs
- 2012: Glasgow Tigers
- 2013–2018: Somerset Rebels
- 2015–2016: Swindon Robins
- 2018: Sheffield Tigers
- 2019: Peterborough Panthers
- 2020–2023: Belle Vue Aces
- 2024–2025: Oxford Spires

Poland
- 2025: Landshut
- 2026: Stal Gorzów Wlkp.

Speedway Grand Prix statistics
- Starts: 1
- Finalist: 0 times
- Winner: 0 times

Individual honours
- 2019: British Champion
- 2023: Championship Riders' Champion

Team honours
- 2022: British champions
- 2013, 2016: British tier 2 champions
- 2013, 2015: British tier 2 KO Cup winner
- 2008, 2014: British tier 2 Fours winner
- 2018, 2022, 2024, 2025: British tier 2 Pairs winner

Charles Martin Wright (born 26 October 1988) is a British speedway rider.

== Career history ==
Wright was born in Stockport, Greater Manchester, started his career with the Buxton Hitmen in the Conference League before stepping up a level and joining the Workington Comets for the 2008 season. He was part of the Workington four who won the Premier League Four-Team Championship, held on 26 July 2008, at Derwent Park.

In 2011, Wright had a spell on loan at Leicester Lions, replacing Jamie Courtney, only to be replaced himself later in the season. In 2012, he rode for Edinburgh Monarchs until being released in July. Shortly after he went on to join the Glasgow Tigers only a few weeks after his axe from Edinburgh replacing long serving reserve Jayden O'Malley and simultaneously joined the Buxton Hitmen in the National League at number one. In late August 2013, he replaced Stefan Nielsen in the Somerset Rebels side, and made an immediate impact when scoring nine-points in the second leg of the KO Cup Semi-final at Edinburgh, which ended in a 90-90 aggregate draw and had to be ridden again the following month when the Rebels eventually carried off the Cup. He went to become a major contributor to the Rebels title and KO Cup winning efforts. In 2014, he was one of only two riders retained from the Rebels double winning septet, with the other being Nick Morris. He was part of the Somerset team that won the Premier League Four-Team Championship, which was held on 3 August 2014, at the East of England Arena.

Wright continued his 2015 season with the Somerset Rebels again.

In December 2016, Wright signed for Redcar Bears in the SGB Championship for the 2017 season. For 2018, he moved to local track Sheffield Tigers and he won the SGB Championship Pairs partnering Kyle Howarth for the Tigers, during the SGB Championship 2018 season. He returned to Redcar Bears again in 2019.

Wright was crowned British Champion for the first time in his career after winning the 2019 British Final at the National Speedway Stadium in Manchester on 29 July. He appeared as Wildcard in the British Grand Prix in Cardiff on 21 September 2019 scoring five points. On 23 October 2019, Wright was awarded his first Great Britain cap when he represented Team Great Britain in the new Global Challenge series against Denmark scoring ten points as joint top scorer. Four days later, Wright became the first Captain of the Redcar Bears to lift the SGB Championship Knock-Out Cup after defeating local rival Newcastle in the final. Wright competed in the inaugural 2019 FIM Oceania Speedway Championship in Gillman South Australia finishing sixth with 11 points.

In 2021 and 2022, Wright rode for the Belle Vue Aces in the SGB Premiership and the Redcar Bears in the SGB Championship. In 2021, he won the bronze medal in the 2021 British Speedway Championship and won the 2022 SGB Championship Pairs Championship for Redcar, with Lewis Kerr. His 2022 season produced further success when he won the SGB Premiership 2022 with his team Belle Vue.

Wright re-signed for Belle Vue for the SGB Premiership 2023 and Redcar Bears for the 2023 and 2024 SGB Championship seasons. In August, he won the SGB Championship Riders' Championship on his home track at the Ecco Arena. At the end of the season, he was released by Belle Vue but signed for the Oxford Spires for the 2024 season.

Wright won the 2024 Pairs Championship with Danny King, and the following year, repeated the success for Redcar, partnering Erik Riss to the pairs championship.

In 2025, Wright captained the Redcar Bears to the British Speedway Network (BSN) Series win in the final against Poole Pirates 91-89 on aggregate..

In 2026, Wright again captained the Redcar Bears but was injured in the first match of the season on 20th March, a friendly against a Newcastle Diamonds select team. He returned to action on 17th July returning a score of 12+1 in his comeback.

In the British Champion Final on August 15th at the National Speedway Stadium in Manchester, Wright finished second to Grand Prix star Robert Lambert earning Wright a Wild Card place for the 2027 Speedway Grand Prix of Great Britain.

Wright was then awarded with a Great Britain team place in the 2026 World Team champion Final in Warsaw on August 29th.

== Family ==
Wright's grandfather, Jim Yacoby rode for the Belle Vue Aces from 1959 until 1967. Wright's brother James is also a speedway rider.

== Major results ==
=== World individual Championship ===
- 2025 Speedway Grand Prix - 20th
