= Jason Edwards (speedway rider) =

British speedway rider (born 2002)

- Born: 14 September 2002 (age 24); Billericay, Essex
- Nationality: British (English)

Career history
- 2018: Cradley Heathens
- 2018–2021: Eastbourne Eagles
- 2019–2022: Mildenhall Fen Tigers
- 2021: Plymouth Gladiators
- 2022–2025: Redcar Bears
- 2022–2023: King's Lynn Stars
- 2023–2024: Sheffield Tigers
- 2025: Birmingham Brummies
- 2025: Ipswich Witches

Team honours
- 2023, 2025: tier 1 Premiership
- 2024: Premiership tier 1 KO Cup
- 2018, 2021: tier 3 NL
- 2018: tier 3 NL KO Cup

Jason Edwards (born 14 September 2002) is a British motorcycle speedway rider.

== Career ==
In 2017, Edwards made a number of guest appearances at reserve after he turned 15 as he was then eligible to ride. He made his National league debut for Lakeside Hammers on 29 September 2017 against Belle Vue Colts, he had an excellent debut scoring 9+1 from five rides.

In 2018, Edwards moved from reserve into the main Eastbourne team for the first time, riding at number 2 for the rest of the season. Edwards also won the League and cup double with Eastbourne defeating Mildenhall Fen Tigers in both finals. Additionally, he rode for the Cradley team that only competed in the National Trophy. He helped the Heathens finish top of the North group taking them to the final against Mildenhall.

In 2019, Edwards re-joined the Eagles after their move up to the SGB Championship and also signed for the Mildenhall Fen Tigers.

Edwards resigned for Eastbourne at the start of the 2020 season which was curtailed by the COVID-19 pandemic and the 2021 season, but moved to Plymouth Gladiators when Eastbourne withdrew from the league.

Edwards signed a new contract for Redcar Bears in the SGB Championship for the 2022 season and later became an asset of the club. He won the British U-21 semi-final at Mildenhall with a 15 point maximum. Additionally, he finished second in the league averages for Mildenhall in the 2022 National Development League speedway season and was voted their rider of the year and appeared for King's Lynn Stars as their rising star.

In 2023, Edwards was named in the King's Lynn Stars team as the rising star for the SGB Premiership 2023. He also re-signed for Redcar Bears for the SGB Championship 2023. After leaving King's Lynn, he joined Sheffield Tigers, a move which proved successful because he won the league title with the club. In 2024 he re-signed for Sheffield and Redcar, winning the Knockout Cup with the Tigers.

Edwards signed for Birmingham Brummies for the SGB Premiership 2025 but switched to Ipswich Witches to replace the injured Jordan Jenkins. He subsequently helped Ipswich win the Premiership title.

== Major results ==
=== World individual Championship ===
- 2023 Speedway Grand Prix - =31st
