= Jake Mulford =

English motorcycle speedway rider (born 2004)

- Born: 4 March 2004 (age 22); Norwich, Norfolk, England
- Nationality: British (English)

Career history
- 2019, 2021: Kent
- 2022–2025: Belle Vue
- 2022: King's Lynn
- 2022: Peterborough
- 2023–2025: Redcar

Individual honours
- 2024: World U23 Longtrack champion

Team honours
- 2024: British league champion
- 2023: Premiership Pairs

Jake Mulford (born 4 March 2004) is an English speedway rider.

== Career ==
In 2019, Mulford signed for the Kent Kings for the 2019 National Development League speedway season.

Unable to ride during 2020 because of COVID-19 cancelled season, Mulford continued to ride for Kent in 2021 but appeared in both the NDL and the higher league of the SGB Championship 2021.

In 2022, Mulford was named the number 8 rider for the King's Lynn Stars in the SGB Premiership 2022 (the highest league in Britain). Mulford later switched to Peterborough Panthers to fulfill the same position for them. He also rode regularly for the Belle Vue Colts during the 2022 National Development League speedway season after leaving Kent.

In 2023, Mulford moved up to the Belle Vue first team, being named as the rising star for the Aces for the SGB Premiership 2023. In addition, he signed for Redcar Bears for the SGB Championship 2023. Mulford (riding as reserve) along with Dan Bewley and Brady Kurtz won the Premiership Pairs for Belle Vue in June 2023.

Mulford re-signed for Redcar for the 2024 season and helped Belle Vue win the 2024 Premiership title. However, his highlight of the season was winning the World U23 Longtrack Championship.
