= Richard Lawson (speedway rider) =

British motorcycle speedway rider (born 1986)

- Born: 14 February 1986 (age 40); Whitehaven, Cumbria, England
- Nationality: British (English)

Career history

Great Britain
- 2009–2013: Workington Comets
- 2014: Redcar Cubs
- 2011: Peterborough Panthers
- 2013–2016, 2018: Lakeside Hammers
- 2015–2017: Glasgow Tigers
- 2017–2018: Somerset Rebels
- 2019–2021: Eastbourne Eagles
- 2019, 2026: Ipswich Witches
- 2020: Sheffield Tigers
- 2021–2022: King's Lynn Stars
- 2022–2025: Poole Pirates
- 2023–2024: Leicester Lions
- 2025: King's Lynn Stars

Poland
- 2018: Opole
- 2023: Tarnów
- 2025: Kraków

Team honours
- 2018: tier 1 KO Cup winner
- 2016, 2022, 2024: tier 2 League champion
- 2016, 2022, 2024: tier 2 KO Cup winner
- 2009: tier 2 Fours winner
- 2010: Young Shield

Richard Lawson (born 14 February 1986) is a British speedway rider.

== Career ==
Lawson was born in Whitehaven, Cumbria. After a successful junior career in motocross, which included winning the British 125cc championship in 2003, he rode professionally for Kawasaki before taking up speedway in June 2008. He made his competitive debut in the Conference League for Redcar Cubs before signing to ride for Workington Comets in the Premier League in 2009. He was part of the Workington four who won the Premier League Four-Team Championship, held on 25 July 2009, at Derwent Park.

Lawson stayed with the Comets in 2010 and also signed for Elite League Wolverhampton Wolves as their number 8. He remained with the Comets until the end of the 2013 season, and gained further Elite League experience in 2012 with Peterborough Panthers and in 2013 with Lakeside Hammers. He signed to ride again for the Hammers in 2014 and opted not to re-sign for the Comets.

In 2015, Lawson moved to Glasgow Tigers in the Premier League, staying with Lakeside in the Elite League. He finished fourth in the averages during the 2015 Premier League speedway season and would spend three seasons in Scotland from 2015 to 2017, winning the Knockout Cup for his club in 2016. He also rode for the Somerset Rebels from 2017 to 2018, winning the division 1 Knockout Cup during the SGB Premiership 2018. In 2019, he joined the Ipswich Witches and Eastbourne Eagles in division 1 and 2 respectively and had his 2020 season with Sheffield curtailed due to the COVID-19 pandemic.

In 2022, Lawson rode for the King's Lynn Stars in the SGB Premiership 2022 and for the Poole Pirates in the SGB Championship 2022. As part of the Poole team he helped them retain their tier 2 league and KO Cup double crown.

Lawson signed for Leicester Lions for the SGB Premiership 2023 and SGB Premiership 2024 seasons. He also re-signed and doubled up with Poole for both the 2023 and 2024 Championship seasons, winning the 2024 league title and knockout cup with the south coast club.

Lawson returned to ride for King's Lynn for the SGB Premiership 2025.
