= Lewis Kerr =

British speedway rider (born 1990)

- Born: 25 March 1990 (age 36); King's Lynn, England
- Nationality: British (English)

Career history
- 2010–2012, 2013–2015, 2018–2022 2024: King's Lynn
- 2012: Plymouth
- 2012, 2017: Somerset
- 2013–2015: Newcastle
- 2016: Ipswich
- 2016: Lakeside
- 2016–2017: Scunthorpe
- 2017, 2025: Poole
- 2018: Glasgow
- 2019–2021: Eastbourne
- 2021–2022: Redcar
- 2022–2023, 2025: Sheffield
- 2023–2024: Oxford
- 2024: Berwick

Team honours
- 2023: SGB Premiership
- 2022: tier 2 Pairs winner
- 2022: tier 1 League Cup

Lewis James Kerr (born 25 March 1990) is a British speedway rider from Snettisham in England.

== Speedway career ==
Kerr took up speedway in late 2009, and made his competitive debut in June the following year for King's Lynn Young Stars' in the National League Knock-Out Cup. Initially named as the team's number 8, towards the end of the season, having averaged almost 6 points per match in National League matches, he was named in the main seven places in the team. He was again named in the team for the 2011 and 2012 seasons. In 2012, he rode in the Premier League as a guest replacement for Plymouth Devils, Somerset Rebels and Leicester Lions, and in November 2012 he was named in a doubling up role in the Lions team for 2013, sharing the number seven position with Lewis Blackbird, while continuing to ride for King's Lynn in the National League. He was released before the start of the season after being offered a full-time reserve position with Newcastle Diamonds for the 2013 Premier League speedway season. He rode for both Newcastle and King's Lynn in 2014.

While racing for Newcastle in 2015, Kerr suffered an almost career-ending crash in a meeting at Peterborough. He was hit by Australian Josh Grajczonek in the third heat, which forced him to go through the fence into a metal gate. He was treated for head injuries at the track for over one hour, before being airlifted to Addenbrooke's Hospital. He was placed into a medically induced coma for three days, before finally waking and breathing on his own. After recovering he raced for Lakeside, Ipswich and Scunthorpe in 2016 and then Scunthorpe, Somerset and Poole in 2017.

In 2017, Kerr made the final of the British Speedway Championship for the first time, finishing 11th. In 2018, he resigned for King's Lynn as well as appearing for Glasgow and reached the final of the British Championship again. During 2019 he signed for Eastbourne for the SGB Championship 2019, while remaining at King's Lynn in the highest league and he finished in fifth place at the 2019 British Speedway Championship. The highlight of a lost 2020 season due to COVID-19 pandemic was a tenth placed finish in the 2020 British Speedway Championship.

In 2021, Kerr rode for the King's Lynn Stars in the SGB Premiership 2021 and the Eastbourne Eagles in the SGB Championship 2021. When the Eagles withdrew from the league due to financial issues Kerr joined the Redcar Bears for the remainder of the 2021 season.

Kerr had a testimonial meeting at King's Lynn Speedway on 20 March 2022, for ten years service to speedway. During 2022, he initially rode for King's Lynn before signing for Sheffield in the SGB Premiership 2022. He also continued to ride for the Redcar Bears in the SGB Championship 2022 and won the 2022 SGB Championship Pairs Championship for Redcar, with Charles Wright. He also helped Sheffield win the League Cup and reach the Play off final.

In 2023, Kerr re-signed for the Sheffield Tigers in the SGB Premiership, where he won the league title. He also signed for Oxford Cheetahs in the SGB Championship 2023.

For the 2024 season, Kerr re-signed for Oxford but with their Premiership team the Spires and joined Berwick Bandits in the Championship. Kerr re-joined Poole Pirates for the SGB Championship 2025 and was also brought in for Sheffield to replace the injured Tai Woffinden.

== Personal life ==
Lewis married Jessica Day on 6 December 2014.
