= SGB Premiership =

Speedway league in the United Kingdom

- Current season, competition or edition: 2026 SGB Premiership
- Sport: Speedway
- Founded: 2017
- First season: 2017
- No. of teams: 6
- Country: United Kingdom
- Most recent champion: Ipswich Witches (2025)
- Most titles: Belle Vue Aces, Swindon Robins (2)
- Broadcaster: Eurosport
- Sponsor: ROWE Motor Oil
- Domestic cup: SGB Premiership Knockout Cup
- Website: www.speedwaygb.co.uk

Notes
- Leagues below SGB Championship; National Development League

The Speedway Great Britain (SGB) Premiership (sponsored by Sports Insure) is the top division of speedway league competition in the United Kingdom, governed by the Speedway Control Bureau (SCB) in conjunction with the British Speedway Promoters' Association (BSPA). It was introduced for 2017 following a restructuring of British speedway.

== Teams ==
=== Current teams ===
- Belle Vue Aces
- Ipswich Witches
- King's Lynn Stars
- Leicester Lions
- Northampton Foxes
- Sheffield Tigers

=== Former teams ===
- Poole Pirates (2017–2019)
- Rye House Rockets (2017–2018)
- Swindon Robins (2017–2019)
- Wolverhampton Wolves (2017–2023)
- Peterborough Panthers (2019–2023)
- Oxford Spires (2024–2025)
- Birmingham Brummies (2024–2025)
- Somerset Rebels (2017-2018)

== Champions ==
Season	Champions	Second	Third	ref
2017	Swindon Robins	Wolverhampton Wolves	Belle Vue Aces / Poole Pirates	
2018	Poole Pirates	King's Lynn Stars	Belle Vue Aces / Somerset Rebels	
2019	Swindon Robins	Ipswich Witches	Poole Pirates / Wolverhampton Wolves	
2020	Cancelled due to the COVID-19 pandemic.			
2021	Peterborough Panthers	Belle Vue Aces	Wolverhampton Wolves / Sheffield Tigers	
2022	Belle Vue Aces	Sheffield Tigers	Ipswich Witches / Wolverhampton Wolves	
2023	Sheffield Tigers	Ipswich Witches	Belle Vue Aces / Wolverhampton Wolves	
2024	Belle Vue Aces	Leicester Lions	Sheffield Tigers / Ipswich Witches	
2025	Ipswich Witches	Leicester Lions	Sheffield Tigers / Belle Vue Aces	

== See also ==
- SGB Championship
- National Development League
- British Speedway Promoters Limited
- Speedway Control Bureau
- List of United Kingdom speedway league champions
