= SGB Championship =

Second division of speedway league in the United Kingdom

- Current season, competition or edition: 2026 SGB Championship
- Sport: Speedway
- Founded: 2017
- No. of teams: 9
- Country: United Kingdom
- Most recent champion: Poole Pirates
- Most titles: Poole Pirates (4)
- Broadcaster: British Speedway Network
- Sponsor: Cab Direct
- Domestic cup: SGB Championship Knockout Cup
- Website: www.speedwaygb.co.uk

Notes
- League Above; SGB Premiership; League Below; National Development League

The Speedway Great Britain (SGB) Championship is the second division of speedway league competition in the United Kingdom, governed by the Speedway Control Bureau (SCB), in conjunction with the British Speedway Promoters' Association (BSPA). It was introduced for 2017 following a restructuring of British speedway.

== Teams ==
=== Current teams ===
- Berwick Bandits
- Edinburgh Monarchs
- Glasgow Tigers
- Oxford Cheetahs
- Plymouth Gladiators
- Poole Pirates
- Redcar Bears
- Scunthorpe Scorpions
- Workington Comets

=== Former teams ===
- Birmingham Brummies (2019–2023)
- Eastbourne Eagles (2019–2021)
- Ipswich Witches (2017–2018)
- Kent Kings (2021)
- Lakeside Hammers (2018)
- Leicester Lions (2019–2022)
- Newcastle Diamonds (until 2022)
- Peterborough Panthers (2017–2018)
- Sheffield Tigers (2017–2019)

== Champions ==
Season	Champions	Second	Third	Ref
2017	Sheffield Tigers	Ipswich Witches	Edinburgh Monarchs / Glasgow Tigers	
2018	Workington Comets	Lakeside Hammers	Peterborough Panthers / Glasgow Tigers	
2019	Leicester Lions	Glasgow Tigers	Redcar Bears / Somerset Rebels	
2020	Cancelled due to the COVID-19 pandemic			
2021	Poole Pirates	Glasgow Tigers	Leicester Lions / Edinburgh Monarchs	
2022	Poole Pirates	Leicester Lions	Edinburgh Monarchs / Glasgow Tigers	
2023	Glasgow Tigers	Poole Pirates	Oxford Cheetahs / Scunthorpe Scorpions	
2024	Poole Pirates	Oxford Cheetahs	Scunthorpe Scorpions / Workington Comets	
2025	Poole Pirates	Gasgow Tigers	Redcar Bears / Edinburgh Monarchs	

== History ==
After the 2016 season, the Premier League was renamed to the SGB Championship for the 2017 season. The 2017 edition of the league contained ten teams who met each other twice (home and away). The top four teams at the end of the regular season qualified for the playoffs to decide the champions. All ten of the teams were from the previous season's Premier League.

In 2017, there was a short-lived relegation and promotion race-off between the Championship and the new top tier, the SGB Premiership, with the bottom team from the Premiership going into a playoff with the Championship winners. The following year in 2018, the promotion/relegation system was scrapped.

== Team building ==
At the start of the season, teams are built up to maximum points limit. The combined Calculated Match Average (CMA) of the riders declared in the team must not be higher than an agreed figure set at the British Speedway Promoters' Association (BSPA) Annual General Meeting.

== See also ==
- List of United Kingdom Speedway League Champions
- SGB Premiership
