= SGB Championship 2017 =

British motorcycle speedway season

- League: SGB Championship
- Champions: Sheffield Tigers
- Knockout Cup: Peterborough Panthers
- Individual: Nick Morris
- Pairs: Sheffield Tigers
- Fours: Peterborough Panthers
- Highest average: Craig Cook
- Division/s above: SGB Premiership
- Division/s below: National League

The Speedway Great Britain Championship 2017 was the second division of British speedway. It was the first time that it was known as the SGB Championship after changing its name from the Premier League.

The season ran between March and October 2017 and 10 teams participated.

The Sheffield Tigers were the champions defeating the Ipswich Witches in the Grand Final.

British TV broadcasting rights changed hands before the start of the 2017 SGB Championship season, when Sky withdrew from their negotiated contract with the BSPA. BT then obtained the broadcasting rights for the 2017 season to be shown on their BT Sport channels.

== Final League table ==
Pos.	Team	M	W	D	L	4W	3W	D	1L	L	F	A	Pts
1	Sheffield Tigers	36	18	0	0	5	3	0	3	7	1748	1515	86
2	Ipswich Witches	36	17	0	1	3	3	0	5	7	1736	1548	77
3	Edinburgh Monarchs	36	16	1	1	3	2	1	2	10	1691	1585	71
4	Glasgow Tigers	36	14	0	4	2	2	2	8	4	1656	1549	68
5	Redcar Bears	36	13	1	4	3	1	1	3	10	1627	1597	60
6	Peterborough Panthers	36	14	1	3	2	2	1	1	12	1582	1653	60
7	Newcastle Diamonds	36	15	1	2	0	2	2	1	13	1629	1617	57
8	Workington Comets	36	11	2	5	0	3	0	3	12	1556	1703	47
9	Scunthorpe Scorpions	36	8	0	10	1	1	0	3	13	1535	1699	34
10	Berwick Bandits	36	9	1	8	0	0	0	2	16	1490	1784	30

== Results ==
=== 'A' Fixtures ===
Home \ Away	BER	ED	GLA	IPS	NEW	PET	RED	SCU	SHE	WOR
Berwick Bandits		42–48	44–46	40–50	51–39	50–40	34–50	42–48	41–52	48–44
Edinburgh Monarchs	57–33		45–45	48–40	53–39	60–30	52–40	54–36	49–44	52–40
Glasgow Tigers	54–38	57–34		49–43	51–42	51–41	52–41	53–37	55–37	46–44
Ipswich Witches	56–37	50–39	48–42		53–39	60–32	54–38	59–32	52–41	59–33
Newcastle Diamonds	58–33	45–45	43–47	52–38		58–34	46–44	46–44	48–42	43–47
Peterborough Panthers	54–38	48–45	55–37	46–44	43–47		51–42	51–42	45–48	51–42
Redcar Bears	49–43	52–40	24–32	54–35	58–34	40–52		51–42	41–49	42–48
Scunthorpe Scorpions	56–34	37–53	47–43	44–46	54–39	44–46	44–46		40–50	61–30
Sheffield Tigers	61–30	55–35	46–44	57–33	60–33	50–40	54–38	51–41		51–39
Workington Comets	48–42	51–42	48–45	54–38	45–45	58–34	45–45	48–45	54–37	

Legend: Blue = home team win; Yellow = draw; Red = away team win.

=== 'B' Fixtures ===
Home \ Away	BER	ED	GLA	IPS	NEW	PET	RED	SCU	SHE	WOR
Berwick Bandits		49–41	42–42	45–47	53–40	47–46	40–52	48–42	50–40	56–37
Edinburgh Monarchs	53–39		46–43	48–41	49–41	58–32	56–34	52–40	39–51	52–40
Glasgow Tigers	58–32	53–39		41–52	52–38	40–50	56–36	55–37	44–49	43–47
Ipswich Witches	56–36	46–47	52–41		54–39	52–41	51–39	60–32	52–38	52–41
Newcastle Diamonds	60–33	46–44	53–39	46–44		58–34	48–41	54–38	54–38	62–29
Peterborough Panthers	53–39	54–38	35–31	48–42	30–30		53–39	51–39	40–50	50–43
Redcar Bears	54–39	52–41	47–42	55–38	55–37	45–45		61–32	48–42	49–44
Scunthorpe Scorpions	49–40	41–49	36–48	43–47	43–46	53–37	39–50		49–41	39–21
Sheffield Tigers	51–42	58–34	54–36	52–38	53–37	51–42	39–33	54–39		56–36
Workington Comets	58–34	38–43	47–43	39–51	46–44	42–48	48–42	43–50	44–46	

Legend: Blue = home team win; Yellow = draw; Red = away team win.

== Play-offs ==
Semi Finals
Ipswich Witches	50	41	91
Edinburgh Monarchs	40	48	88
Sheffield Tigers	59	31	90
Glasgow Tigers	31	34	65

Grand Final
Ipswich Witches	37	44	81
Sheffield Tigers	53	46	100

== Play-off Final ==
First leg

28 September 2017

Sheffield Tigers Josh Bates 13 Kyle Howarth 13 Todd Kurtz 7 Jan Graversen 7 Lasse Bjerre 7 George Wood 3 Josh Grajczonek 3	53 – 37	Ipswich Witches Nathan Greaves 9 Danny King 9 Rory Schlein 8 Cameron Heeps 6 Kyle Newman 4 Tom Bacon 1 Justin Sedgman R/R

Owlerton Stadium

Second leg

30 September 2017

Ipswich Witches Cameron Heeps 13 Danny King 9 Rory Schlein 7 Kyle Newman 7 Nathan Greaves 5 Alfie Bowtell 3 Justin Sedgman R/R	44 – 56	Sheffield Tigers Scott Nicholls 12 Josh Bates 9 Kyle Howarth 9 Jan Graversen 7 Lasse Bjerre 6 Todd Kurtz 3 George Wood 0

Foxhall Stadium

Sheffield were declared League Champions, winning on aggregate 99–81.

== Promotion and relegation play-off ==
9 October

Sheffield Tigers	32–58	Leicester Lions	Owlerton Stadium; Referee(s): Craig Ackroyd

16 October

Leicester Lions	49–41	Sheffield Tigers	Beaumont Park Stadium; Referee(s): Mick Bates

== Knockout Cup ==
The 2017 SGB Championship Knockout Cup was the 50th edition of the Knockout Cup for tier two teams. It was the first time it would be known as the SGB Championship Knockout Cup. Peterborough Panthers were the winners of the competition.

First round

Date	Team One	Score	Team Two
22/04	Workington	49-41	Newcastle
13/04	Redcar	44-46	Peterborough
09/04	Peterborough	49-39	Redcar
02/04	Newcastle	49-41	Workington

Quarter Final

Quarter Finals
Peterborough Panthers	54	40	94
Scunthorpe Scorpions	36	50	86
Ipswich Witches	60	49	101
Berwick Bandits	30	49	79
Sheffield Tigers	43	53	96
Edinburgh Monarchs	47	37	84
Glasgow Tigers	46	46	92
Newcastle Diamonds	44	44	88

Semi Finals
Peterborough Panthers	50	45	95
Glasgow Tigers	40	45	85
Sheffield Tigers	51	35	86
Ipswich Witches	39	55	94

Final
Peterborough Panthers	47	45	92
Ipswich Witches	43	45	88

=== Final ===
First leg

22 October 2017

Peterborough Panthers Scott Nicholls 12 Paul Starke 9 Chris Harris 9 Ulrich Østergaard 7 Simon Lambert 7 Scott Campos 3 Bradley Wilson Dean R/R	47 – 43	Ipswich Witches Danny King 13 Cameron Heeps 12 Kyle Newman 8 Connor Mountain 7 Nathan Greaves 3 Rory Schlein 0 Justin Sedgman R/R

East of England Showground

Second leg

26 October 2017

Ipswich Witches Scott Nicholls 13 Cameron Heeps 13 Nathan Greaves 8 Kyle Newman 5 Connor Mountain 3 Danny King 3 Justin Sedgman R/R	45 – 45	Peterborough Panthers Chris Harris 12 Ben Barker 9 Paul Starke 8 Simon Lambert 6 Ulrich Østergaard 6 Jack Parkinson Blackburn 4 Bradley Wilson Dean 0

Foxhall Stadium

Peterborough were declared Knockout Cup Champions, winning on aggregate 92–88.

== Riders' Championship ==
Nick Morris won the Riders' Championship. The final was held on 13 October at Ashfield Stadium.

Pos.	Rider	Pts	Total	SF	Final
1	(Australia) Nick Morris	1 2 3 2 2	10	2	3
2	(England) Chris Harris	2 2 2 3 3	12	-	2
3	(England) Richie Worrall	3 3 3 3 3	15	-	1
4	(England) Richard Lawson	2 3 1 2 3	11	3	0
5	(England) Stuart Robson	2 3 3 2 2	12	1	
6	(United States) Ricky Wells	2 3 1 3 R	9	0	
7	(England) Paul Starke	1 1 3 1 3	9		
8	(Australia) Jack Holder	R 2 2 3 1	8		
9	(England) Steve Worrall	3 2 0 1 2	8		
10	(Australia) Aaron Summers	1 1 2 1 2	7		
11	(England) Danny King	3 0 1 1 1	6		
12	(England) Josh Auty	0 FX 1 2 1	4		
13	(Denmark) Michael Palm Toft	1 1 2 R	4		
14	(Australia) Sam Masters	3 X R R -	3		
15	(Denmark) Jan Graversen	0 1 0 0 1	2		
16	(Scotland) Ryan MacDonald	F F 0 F 0	0		
16	(Scotland) Kevin Whelan (res)	0 0	0		

- f=fell, r-retired, ex=excluded, ef=engine failure t=touched tapes

== Pairs ==
The SGB Championship Pairs was held at Owlerton Stadium on 8 October. The event was won by Sheffield Tigers.

Group A
Pos	Team	Pts	Riders
1	Scunthorpe	23	Kerr 12, Auty 11
2	Glasgow	21	Lawson 14, Summers 7
3	Peterborough	21	Ostergaard 13, Harris 8
4	Ipswich	16	King 12, Schlein 4
5	Workington	9	Proctor 6, Campton 3

Group B
Pos	Team	Pts	Riders
1	Redcar	25	Wright 13, Barker 12
2	Sheffield	21	Howarth 11, Bjerre 10
3	Edinburgh	21	Masters 12, Wells 8
4	Newcastle	13	Robson 8, Lindgren 5
5	Berwick	11	Howe 7, Doolan 4

Semi finals

- Sheffield bt Scunthorpe 7–2
- Redcar bt Glasgow 6–3

Final

- Sheffield bt Redcar 5–4

== Fours ==
Peterborough Panthers won the SGB Championship Fours, held on 6 August 2017, at the East of England Arena.

Group A
Pos	Team	Pts	Riders
1	Sheffield	16	Grajczonek 5, Howarth 4, Kurtz 4, Bates 3
2	Peterborough	14	Harris 6, Ostergaard 5, Starke 2, Lambert 1
3	Workington	11	Jorgensen 5, Campton 4, Proctor 1, Cook 1
4	Scunthorpe	10	Allen 5, Kerr 3, Auty 2, Douglas 0, Palm Toft 0
5	Edinburgh	9	Riss 5, Wells 2, Pjiper 1, Pickering 1, Clegg 0

Group B
Pos	Team	Pts	Riders
1	Ipswich	18	Schlein 6, Sedgemen 5, Heeps 4, King 3
2	Redcar	13	Wright 5, Andersen 3, Barker 3, Garrity 1, Perks 1
3	Newcastle	12	Worrall 6, Robson 3, Lindgren 3, Morris 0
4	Glasgow	9	Lawson 3, Summers 3, Lunna 3, Bewley 0
5	Berwick	8	Doolan 5, Howe 2, Etheridge 1, Gappmaier 0, Ruddick 0

Final
Pos	Team	Pts	Riders
1	Peterborough	28	Harris 9, Ostergaard 9, Starke 5, Lambert 5
2	Redcar	18	Wright 7, Garrity 6, Barker 3, Andersen 2
3	Sheffield	16	Howarth 6, Grajczonek 5, Kurtz 3, Bates 2
4	Ipswich	10	King 6, Schlein 2, Sedgemen 1, Heeps 1

== Final leading averages ==
Rider	Team	Average
(England) Craig Cook	Workington	10.30
(Australia) Josh Grajczonek	Sheffield	9.77
(England) Robert Lambert	Newcastle	9.74
(England) Steve Worrall	Newcastle	9.44
(Australia) Jack Holder	Peterborough	9.22
(England) Danny King	Ipswich	9.29
(New Zealand) Ricky Wells	Edinburgh	9.24
(Australia) Nick Morris	Berwick	9.07
(England) Richie Worrall	Glasgow	9.03
(England) Kyle Howarth	Sheffield	9.00

== Teams and final averages ==
Berwick Bandits

- (Australia) Nick Morris 9.07
- (England) Lewis Bridger 6.98
- (Australia) Kevin Doolan 6.81
- (England) David Howe 6.50
- (Denmark) Claus Vissing 6.26
- (Australia) Jye Etheridge 5.91
- (Austria) Dany Gappmaier 5.89
- (France) Dimitri Bergé 4.73
- (England) Joe Jacobs 4.34
- (England) Lee Payne 2.78
- (England) Liam Carr 2.47

Edinburgh Monarchs

- (United States) Ricky Wells 9.24
- (Australia) Sam Masters 8.93
- (Germany) Erik Riss 8.32
- (Germany) Mark Riss 6.39
- (Australia) Josh Pickering 5.42
- (Netherlands) Theo Pijper 5.14
- (England) Max Clegg 5.03
- (Australia) Mitchell Davey 3.82

Glasgow Tigers

- (England) Richie Worrall 9.03
- (England) Richard Lawson 8.93
- (Australia) Aaron Summers 8.40
- (Finland) Nike Lunna 7.17
- (England) Dan Bewley 6.62
- (England) Tom Perry 4.50
- (England) Jack Smith 3.16

Ipswich Witches

- (England) Danny King 9.29
- (Australia) Rory Schlein 8.99
- (Argentina) Nico Covatti 8.38
- (Australia) Cameron Heeps 7.81
- (England) Kyle Newman 7.35
- (Australia) Justin Sedgmen 6.83
- (England) Nathan Greaves 5.30
- (England) Danyon Hume 5.03
- (England) Connor Mountain 4.36
- (England) James Sarjeant 4.80

Newcastle Diamonds

- (England) Robert Lambert 9.74
- (England) Steve Worrall 9.44
- (Sweden) Ludvig Lindgren 8.00
- (England) Stuart Robson 7.87
- (England) Lewis Rose 7.53
- (England) Ashley Morris 5.76
- (England) Danny Phillips 4.75
- (England) Ben Hopwood 2.92
- (England) Alfie Bowtell 2.79
- (England) Dan Greenwood 2.33 (3 matches only)
- (England) Connor Coles 0.80

Peterborough Panthers

- (Australia) Jack Holder 9.22
- (England) Chris Harris 8.99
- (Denmark) Ulrich Østergaard 7.83
- (England) Paul Starke 7.06
- (New Zealand) Bradley Wilson-Dean 6.49
- (Denmark) Kenneth Hansen 6.44
- (England) Simon Lambert 5.57
- (England) Tom Bacon 3.50
- (England) Richard Hall 2.97
- (England) Liam Carr 2.57

Redcar Bears

- (England) Ben Barker 8.78
- (England) Charles Wright 8.06
- (England) Jason Garrity 7.62
- (Denmark) Jonas B. Andersen 7.23
- (England) Ellis Perks 6.13
- (Germany) Tobias Busch 5.95
- (England) Danny Ayres 5.64
- (Argentina) Coty Garcia 4.96
- (England) Richard Hall 3.32

Scunthorpe Scorpions

- (Australia) Jake Allen 8.36
- (England) Josh Auty 7.48
- (England) Lewis Kerr 7.44
- (Denmark) Michael Palm Toft 7.23
- (Australia) Ryan Douglas 6.91
- (Denmark) Stefan Nielsen 6.18
- (England) Carl Wilkinson 5.83
- (Finland) Tero Aarnio 5.51
- (England) Josh Bailey 3.39
- (Austria) Fritz Wallner 3.76

Sheffield Tigers

- (Australia) Josh Grajczonek 9.77
- (England) Kyle Howarth 9.00
- (Denmark) Lasse Bjerre 8.75
- (England) Josh Bates 7.53
- (Australia) Todd Kurtz 6.11
- (Denmark) Jan Graversen 6.04
- (Australia) Robert Branford 4.70
- (England) Jack Parkinson-Blackburn 3.13
- (England) Georgie Wood 2.85
- (Wales) Nathan Stoneman 0.36

Workington Comets

- (England) Craig Cook 10.30
- (Australia) Ty Proctor 7.47
- (Denmark) Thomas Jørgensen 7.39
- (Australia) Mason Campton 6.61
- (England) Matt Williamson 5.63
- (England) Adam Roynon 5.20
- (England) James Sarjeant 3.90
- (England) Rob Shuttleworth 2.40

== See also ==
- SGB Premiership 2017
- List of United Kingdom Speedway League Champions
- Knockout Cup (speedway)
