= SGB Championship 2025 =

Second tier of 2025 British speedway season

- League: SGB Championship
- No. of competitors: 9
- Champions: Poole Pirates
- Knockout Cup: Poole Pirates
- BSN Series: Redcar Bears
- Pairs: Redcar Bears
- Riders' Championship: Chris Harris
- Highest average: Richard Lawson
- Division/s above: SGB Premiership
- Division/s below: 2025 NDL

The 2025 SGB Cab Direct Championship season was the 78th season of the second tier of British Speedway and the 8th known as the SGB Championship.

Poole Pirates were the defending league champions, Knockout Cup champions and BSN Series champions.

== Summary ==
The same nine clubs from 2024 competed in the Championship in 2025. The format also remained the same with each team racing against each other twice (home and away), meaning a total of 16 fixtures each during the season. The Cab Direct Knockout Cup and the BSN Series also returned, both following the same formats as in 2024.

The top four teams qualified for the playoffs, staged over two semi-finals and a final. The points limit for team building remained at 40 points.

Glasgow finished top of the table during the regular season, finishing one point ahead of Poole.

Locations of the 2025 SGB Championship teams

== League ==
=== Regular season ===
Pos.	Club	M	Home			Away			F	A	B	Pts	+/−
Pos.	Club	M	W	SHL	L	W	SHL	L	F	A	B	Pts	+/−
1	Glasgow Tigers **(Q)**	16	7	0	1	6	0	2	757	683	6	**32**	+74
2	Poole Pirates **(Q)**	16	8	0	0	4	0	4	775	664	7	**31**	+111
3	Redcar Bears **(Q)**	16	7	0	1	4	0	4	752	686	5	**27**	+66
4	Edinburgh Monarchs **(Q)**	16	6	0	2	2	0	6	718	7-3	6	**21**	+15
5	Berwick Bandits	16	6	1	1	1	0	7	701	713	4	**19**	-12
6	Oxford Cheetahs	16	4	0	4	2	0	6	705	732	3	**15**	-27
7	Workington Comets	16	6	0	2	0	0	8	694	737	3	**13**†	-43
8	Plymouth Gladiators	16	5	0	3	0	0	8	682	755	2	**12**	-73
9	Scunthorpe Scorpions	16	3	0	5	1	0	7	663	774	1	**10**	-111

† Workington deducted 2 Championship points for breaching SCB regulations.

==== Fixtures and results ====
Home \ Away	BER	EDI	GLA	OXF	PLY	POL	RED	SCU	WOR
Berwick		37–35	45–45	44–46	53–37	46–44	48–42	54–36	47–35
Edinburgh	51–39		43–47	50–40	51–39	42–48	47–43	48–42	55–35
Glasgow	47–43	53–37		55–35	53–37	43–47	48–42	62–28	48–42
Oxford	55–35	44–45	44–46		47–43	43–46	41–49	49–41	50–40
Plymouth	46–44	46–44	40–50	52–37		47–43	44–46	42–47	52–37
Poole	55–35	53–37	57–33	48–42	48–42		51–39	55–35	47–43
Redcar	47–43	50–40	42–48	48–42	54–36	46–44		55–35	53–37
Scunthorpe	50–40	40–50	45–45	41–49	50–40	40–50	43–45		58–32
Workington	42–48	47–43	56–34	49–41	51–39	51–39	39–51	58–32	

Legend: Blue = home team win; Yellow = draw; Red = away team win.

=== Play Offs ===
**Semi Finals**
1	**Glasgow Tigers**	38	**53**	91
4	Edinburgh Monarchs	**52**	37	89
3	Redcar Bears	42	**42**	84
2	**Poole Pirates**	**48**	48	96

**Grand Final**
Glasgow Tigers	39	**51**	90+2
**Poole Pirates**	**51**	39	90+7

Home team scores are in bold
Overall aggregate scores are in red

=== Final ===
First Leg

15 October

Poole Pirates; Richard Lawson 14; Zach Cook 11; Lewis Kerr 8 Anders Rowe 7 William Cairns 5 Tobias Thomsen 3 Paul Starke 3	51–39	Glasgow Tigers; Dan Thompson 9 Chris Harris 9 Kyle Howarth 6 Villads Nagel 5 Leon Flint 5 Freddy Hodder 4 Max Perry 1	Poole Stadium; Referee(s): Christina Turnbull

Second Leg

17 October

Glasgow Tigers; Chris Harris 15; Kyle Howarth 9 Dan Thompson 8 Leon Flint 8 Villads Nagel 6 Freddy Hodder 5 Max Perry 0	51–39	Poole Pirates; Zach Cook 10; Lewis Kerr 8 Richard Lawson 7 Anders Rowe 6 William Cairns 4 Tobias Thomsen 3 Paul Starke 1	Ashfield Stadium; Referee(s): Craig Ackroyd

Super Heat

17 October	Glasgow Tigers; Chris Harris 2 Kyle Howarth 0	2–7	Poole Pirates; Zach Cook 4 Richard Lawson 3

== Knockout Cup ==
The 2025 SGB Championship Knockout Cup was the 57th edition of the Knockout Cup for tier two teams and the 8th edition under the SGB Championship Knockout Cup name.

**Round One**
**Edinburgh Monarchs**	**65**	45	110
Workington Comets	24	**45**	69

**Quarter Finals**
Edinburgh Monarchs	**49**	32	81
**Glasgow Tigers**	41	**58**	99
Plymouth Gladiators	**49**	38	87
**Poole Pirates**	41	**52**	93
Berwick Bandits	**47**	37	84
**Redcar Bears**	43	**53**	96
**Oxford Cheetahs**	**55**	42	97
Scunthorpe Scorpions	35	**48**	83

**Semi Finals**
Glasgow Tigers	38	**49**	87
**Poole Pirates**	**52**	41	93
**Redcar Bears**	**48**	42	90+5
Oxford Cheetahs	42	**48**	90+4

**Final**
**Poole Pirates**	**52**	51	103
Redcar Bears	38	**39**	77

Home team scores are in bold
Overall aggregate scores are in red

=== Final ===
First Leg

8 October

Poole Pirates; Richard Lawson 14; Zach Cook 13; Lewis Kerr 8 Tobias Thomsen 6 Anders Rowe 6 Paul Starke 3 William Cairns 2	52–38	Redcar Bears; Charles Wright 10; Danny King 8 Ace Pijper 6 Jake Mulford 6 Jason Edwards 4 Jake Allen (guest) 4 Freddy Hodder (guest) 0	Poole Stadium; Referee(s): Simon Humphrey-Kennett

Second Leg

10 October

Redcar Bears; Ace Pijper 9 Charles Wright 8 Leon Flint (guest) 7 Danny King 6 Jake Mulford 5 Jason Edwards 3 Ben Trigger (guest) 1	39–51	Poole Pirates; Richard Lawson 15; Zach Cook 12; Lewis Kerr 7 Anders Rowe 6 Paul Starke 4 William Cairns 4 Tobias Thomsen 3	Ecco Arena; Referee(s): Chris Gay

== BSN Series ==
Scottish Group

Fixtures

Home \ Away	BER	EDB	GLA
Berwick		47–43	43–47
Edinburgh	46–43		44–46
Glasgow	48–42	50–40	

Updated to match(es) played on unknown. Source:
Legend: Blue = home team win; Yellow = draw; Red = away team win.

Table

Pos.	Club	M	Home			Away			F	A	B	Pts	+/−
Pos.	Club	M	W	SHL	L	W	SHL	L	F	A	B	Pts	+/−
1	Glasgow Tigers **(Q)**	4	2	0	0	2	0	0	191	169	2	**10**	+22
2	Berwick Bandits	4	1	0	1	0	0	2	175	184	1	**3**	-9
3	Edinburgh Monarchs	4	1	0	1	0	0	2	173	186	0	**2**	-13

Northern Group

Fixtures

Home \ Away	RED	SCU	WOR
Redcar		57–32	51–39
Scunthorpe	46–44		61–29
Workington	36–54	47–43	

Updated to match(es) played on unknown. Source:
Legend: Blue = home team win; Yellow = draw; Red = away team win.

Table

Pos.	Club	M	Home			Away			F	A	B	Pts	+/−
Pos.	Club	M	W	SHL	L	W	SHL	L	F	A	B	Pts	+/−
1	Redcar Bears **(Q)**	4	2	0	0	1	0	1	206	153	2	**8**	+53
2	Scunthorpe Scorpions	4	2	0	0	0	0	2	182	177	1	**5**	+5
3	Workington Comets	4	1	0	1	0	0	2	151	209	0	**2**	-58

Southern Group

Fixtures

Home \ Away	OXF	PLY	POL
Oxford		50–40	45–45
Plymouth	41–48		46–44
Poole	44–46	58–32	

Updated to match(es) played on unknown. Source:
Legend: Blue = home team win; Yellow = draw; Red = away team win.

Table

Pos.	Club	M	Home			Away			F	A	B	Pts	+/−
Pos.	Club	M	W	SHL	L	W	SHL	L	F	A	B	Pts	+/−
1	Oxford Cheetahs **(Q)**	4	1	1	0	2	0	0	189	170	2	**9**	+19
2	Poole Pirates **(Q)**	4	1	0	1	1	0	1	191	169	1	**5**	+22
3	Plymouth Gladiators	4	1	0	1	0	0	2	159	200	0	**2**	-41

=== Knockout stages ===
**Semi-finals**
Oxford Cheetahs	32	**38**	70
**Poole Pirates**	**58**	52	110
**Redcar Bears**	44	**43**	87*
Glasgow Tigers	**46**	41	87

**Grand Final**
Poole Pirates	44	45	89
**Redcar Bears**	**46**	45	91

Home team scores are in bold
Overall aggregate scores are in red

- Redcar were declared as winners due to having more heat advantages across both legs, as per SCB Regulation 012.1.26 Abandonment.

=== Final ===
First Leg

18 October

Redcar Bears; Chrles Wright 12; Danny King 8 Jason Edwards 7 Jake Mulford 6 Leon Flint (guest) 5 Ace Pijper 4 Jody Scott 4	46–44	Poole Pirates; Zach Cook 11; Lewis Kerr 9 Anders Rowe 8 Richard Lawson 7 William Cairns 4 Paul Starke 3 Tobias Thomsen 2	Ecco Arena; Referee(s): Michael Breckon

Second Leg

24 October

Poole Pirates; Zach Cook 12; Richard Lawson 9 Anders Rowe 6 Paul Starke 5 Tobias Thomsen 5 William Cairns 4 Lewis Kerr 4	45–45	Redcar Bears; Danny King 14; Charles Wright 10; Jason Edwards 9 Jody Scott 7 Jake Mulford 5 Ace Pijper 0 Erik Riss r/r	Poole Stadium; Referee(s): Gary Allen

== Pairs Championship ==
The 2025 edition of the SGB Championship Pairs took place on Saturday 5 April, at the GT Tyres Arena in Workington. It was won by Redcar Bears for the second season in a row, and the third time in the last four years.

Qualifying heats

Pos	Team	Pts	Riders
1	Glasgow Tigers	25	Kyle Howarth 13, Chris Harris 12
2	Poole Pirates	24	Lewis Kerr 12, Zach Cook 12
3	Plymouth Gladiators	24	Nicolai Klindt 14, Ben Barker 10
4	Redcar Bears	20	Charles Wright 10, Erik Riss 10
5	Berwick Bandits	17	Drew Kemp 11, Danyon Hume 6
6	Oxford Cheetahs	16	Sam Masters 12, Jordan Jenkins 4
7	Scunthorpe Scorpions	12	Steve Worrall 12, Simon Lambert 0
8	Edinburgh Monarchs	12	Kye Thomson 12, Justin Sedgmen 0
9	Workington Comets	12	Antti Vuolas 10, Tate Zischke 2

Semi-finals

Team One	Team Two	Score	Result
Redcar	Glasgow	7-2	Wright 4, Riss 3, Harris 2, Howarth 0
Poole	Plymouth	6-3	Cook 4, Klindt 3, Kerr 2, Barker 0

Final

Team One	Team Two	Score	Result
Redcar	Poole	6-3	Riss 4, Cook 3, Wright 2, Kerr X

== Riders' Championship ==
The 2025 edition of the SGB Championship Riders Championship took place on Sunday 6 April at the Eddie Wright Raceway in Scunthorpe. It was won by Chris Harris of the Glasgow Tigers.

Pos.	Rider	Pts	Total	SF	Final
1	(England) Chris Harris (Glasgow)	3,3,1,2,0	9	2	3
2	(England) Kyle Howarth (Glasgow)	0,2,3,2,3	10	3	2
3	(England) Steve Worrall (Scunthorpe)	3,3,3,3,2	14	-	1
4	(England) Charles Wright (Redcar)	1,2,2,3,3	11	-	0
5	(England) Richard Lawson (Poole)	3,1,3,2,X	9	1	
6	(England) Ben Barker (Plymouth)	3,0,1,1,3	8	0	
7	(England) Danny King (Redcar)	1,3,0,3,1	8		
8	(Australia) Sam Masters (Oxford)	2,1,3,1,1	8		
9	(Finland) Antti Vuolas (Workington)	2,2,2,0,2	8		
10	(Australia) Justin Sedgmen (Edinburgh)	0,1,2,3,1	7		
11	(England) Drew Kemp (Berwick)	1,3,2,R,0	6		
12	(Australia) Jake Allen (Scunthorpe)	2,0,0,2,2	6		
13	(Australia) Tate Zischke (Workington)	0,2,0,0,3	5		
14	(England) Simon Lambert (Scunthorpe)	2,1,1,1,0	5		
15	(England) Dan Thompson (Plymouth)	1,R,1,1,2	5		
16	(England) Luke Harrison (Scunthorpe)	-,-,-,-,1	1		
17	(Australia) Kye Thomson (Edinburgh)	0,0,0,0,0	0		

== Leading averages ==
	Rider	Team	Average
1	(England) Richard Lawson	Poole	10.33
2	(Australia) Sam Masters	Oxford	10.21
3	(Denmark) Jonas Jeppesen	Berwick	9.67
4	(England) Chris Harris	Glasgow	9.63
5	(England) Charles Wright	Redcar	9.47
6	(England) Dan Thompson	Glasgow	9.38
7	(Australia) Zach Cook	Poole	8.86
8	(England) Kyle Howarth	Glasgow	8.83
9	(England) Danny King	Redcar	8.76
10	(England) Scott Nicholls	Plymouth	8.60

- averages include league, play offs, knockout cup & bsn series, min 6 matches

== Squads & final averages ==
=== Berwick Bandits ===
- (Denmark) Jonas Jeppesen 9.67
- (England) Craig Cook 8.57
- (Denmark) Peter Kildemand 8.54
- (England) Drew Kemp 8.42
- (Australia) Nick Morris 7.45
- (England) Danyon Hume 6.52
- (England) Sam Hagon 4.05
- (England) Jack Smith 3.87
- (Australia) Dayle Wood 3.24
- (Denmark) Bastian Borke 1.33

=== Edinburgh Monarchs ===
- (Sweden) Victor Palovaara 8.30
- (Australia) Justin Sedgmen 8.03
- (Italy) Michele Paco Castagna (C) 7.70
- (Poland) Oskar Polis 7.48
- (Australia) Kye Thomson 7.27
- (Sweden) Jonatan Grahn 6.36
- (Denmark) Michael Palm Toft 6.00
- (Australia) Jordy Loftus 2.77
- (England) Max James 2.29
- (England) Mark Parker 1.67

=== Glasgow Tigers ===
- (England) Chris Harris (C) 9.63
- (England) Dan Thompson 9.38
- (England) Kyle Howarth 8.83
- (England) Leon Flint 8.07
- (Denmark) Villads Nagel 7.93
- (England) Ashton Boughen 3.50
- (England) Freddy Hodder 3.37
- (England) Max Perry 2.85

=== Oxford Cheetahs ===
- (Australia) Sam Masters (C) 10.21
- (England) Dan Gilkes 6.80
- (Denmark) Jonas Knudsen 6.38
- (Australia) Mitchell McDiarmid 6.18
- (Australia) Luke Killeen 6.05
- (England) Jordan Jenkins 5.63
- (Latvia) Francis Gusts 5.54
- (Australia) Cameron Heeps 5.28

=== Plymouth Gladiators ===
- (England) Scott Nicholls 8.60
- (Denmark) Nicolai Klindt 8.44
- (England) Ben Barker (C) 6.93
- (England) Joe Thompson 6.74
- (England) Alfie Bowtell 5.81
- (Norway) Lasse Fredriksen 5.80
- (Czech Republic) Daniel Klíma 4.73
- (England) Ben Trigger 4.54
- (Australia) Mitchell Cluff 3.83
- (England) Tom Spencer 1.20

=== Poole Pirates ===
- (England) Richard Lawson 10.33
- (Australia) Zach Cook (C) 8.86
- (England) Anders Rowe 7.76
- (England) Lewis Kerr 7.57
- (Denmark) Tobias Thomsen 5.71
- (England) William Cairns 4.91
- (England) Paul Starke 4.66
- (England) Darryl Ritchings 3.52
- (Australia) Matt Marson 1.00

=== Redcar Bears ===
- (England) Charles Wright (C) 9.47
- (England) Danny King 8.76
- (Germany) Erik Riss 8.53
- (England) Jason Edwards 7.13
- (England) Jake Mulford 5.62
- (Scotland) Ace Pijper 4.93
- (England) Jody Scott 4.82
- (England) Tom Spencer 3.16

=== Scunthorpe Scorpions ===
- (England) Steve Worrall 7.48
- (Australia) Jake Allen 7.06
- (England) Connor Mountain 6.61
- (England) Luke Harrison 6.18
- (Australia) Zaine Kennedy 6.04
- (England) Simon Lambert (C) 5.39
- (Australia) Declan Kennedy 5.21

=== Workington Comets ===
- (Australia) Troy Batchelor (C) 7.70
- (Finland) Antti Vuolas 6.89
- (Australia) Jye Etheridge 6.52
- (Australia) Jacob Hook 6.17
- (Australia) Tate Zischke 6.13
- (Australia) Fraser Bowes 5.68
- (England) Vinnie Foord 4.11

== See also ==
- List of United Kingdom speedway league champions
- Knockout Cup (speedway)
