= SGB Championship 2023 =

Second tier of 2023 British speedway season

- League: SGB Championship
- No. of competitors: 9
- Champions: Glasgow Tigers
- Knockout Cup: Scunthorpe Scorpions
- BSN Series: Poole Pirates
- Pairs: Glasgow Tigers
- Riders' Championship: Charles Wright
- Highest average: Ryan Douglas
- Division/s above: SGB Premiership
- Division/s below: SGB National League

The 2023 SGB Championship season (sponsored by Cab Direct) was the 76th season of the second tier of British Speedway and the 6th known as the SGB Championship. The British Speedway Network (BSN) streamed 35 matches live for the second year running.

== Summary ==
Nine clubs competed in the Championship in 2023, with Edinburgh Monarchs remaining in the league despite problems surrounding their home venue. The only change to the league was Leicester Lions, who left for the higher league of the SGB Premiership 2023.

The league format was the same as in 2022, with each team racing against each other twice (home and away), meaning a total of 16 fixtures each during the season. The points system was revamped and simplified, with teams scoring two points for a win (home or away), with a bonus point scored for an aggregate win. A 'Super Heat' was also introduced in the event of a tied meeting, with the winners scoring two league points and the losers gaining one point.

Locations of the 2023 SGB Championship teams

The top six teams qualified for the playoffs, however they were split into two groups of three, with the winners of each qualifying for the Grand Final. Finally, the points limit for team construction was reduced from 42 to 40 points.

Glasgow Tigers won the title for the first time 2011, while Scunthorpe Scorpions claimed the knockout cup. Poole Pirates had been looking to secure an unprecedented third consecutive double of league and cup, however they lost in both finals. However, Poole did win the BSN Series, an early season competition.

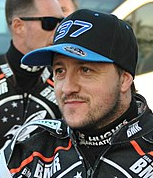
Chris Harris, league and pairs champion with Glasgow

== League ==
=== Regular season ===
League table

Pos.	Club	M	Home			Away			F	A	B	Pts	+/−
Pos.	Club	M	W	SHL	L	W	SHL	L	F	A	B	Pts	+/−
1	Poole Pirates	16	8	0	0	6	0	2	818	622	7	35	+196
2	Oxford Cheetahs	16	8	0	0	5	0	3	791	647	8	34	+144
3	Glasgow Tigers (C)	16	8	0	0	5	0	3	772	614	5	31	+148
4	Scunthorpe Scorpions	16	6	1	1	2	0	6	758	657	6	23	+101
5	Redcar Bears	16	6	1	1	3	0	5	719	702	4	23	+17
6	Edinburgh Monarchs	16	3	0	5	3	0	5	662	758	3	15	-96
7	Birmingham Brummies	16	2	0	6	2	0	6	629	791	2	10	-162
8	Berwick Bandits	16	3	0	5	0	0	8	641	797	1	7	-156
9	Plymouth Gladiators	16	2	0	6	0	0	8	621	813	0	4	-192

Fixtures & results

Home \ Away	BER	BIR	EDI	GLA	OXF	PLY	POL	RED	SCU
Berwick		40–50	44–46	36–53	44–46	52–38	40–50	46–44	47–43
Birmingham	48–42		36–54	36–53	36–54	50–40	36–54	44–46	35–55
Edinburgh	49–41	38–34		39–51	37–52	60–29	35–55	43–47	36–54
Glasgow	63–27	64–26	49–41		51–39	55–35	46–44	51–39	38–28
Oxford	53–37	55–35	54–36	52–38		59–31	52–38	52–38	50–40
Plymouth	45–44	42–47	44–46	42–48	42–47		44–46	41–49	49–41
Poole	54–36	57–33	59–31	53–37	51–39	64–26		52–38	49–41
Redcar	57–33	46–44	58–32	33–39	48–42	48–41	45–45		48–42
Scunthorpe	58–32	51–39	51–39	54–36	45–45	57–32	43–47	55–35	

Legend: Blue = home team win; Yellow = draw; Red = away team win.

=== Play Offs ===
Six of the nine teams qualified for the play offs, including sixth placed Edinburgh who lost 10 of their 16 matches.

Group A

Fixtures

Home \ Away	EDI	POL	SCU
Edinburgh		36–54	36–54
Poole	55–35		45–45
Scunthorpe	59–31	40–50	

Updated to match(es) played on unknown. Source:
Legend: Blue = home team win; Yellow = draw; Red = away team win.

Table

Pos.	Club	M	Home			Away			F	A	B	Pts	+/−
Pos.	Club	M	W	SHL	L	W	SHL	L	F	A	B	Pts	+/−
1	Poole Pirates (Q)	4	2	0	0	2	0	0	204	156	2	10	+48
2	Scunthorpe Scorpions	4	1	0	1	1	1	0	198	162	1	6	+36
3	Edinburgh Monarchs	4	0	0	2	0	0	2	138	222	0	0	-84

Group B

Fixtures

Home \ Away	GLA	OXF	RED
Glasgow		52–38	55–35
Oxford	50–40		53–37
Redcar	39–51	43–47	

Updated to match(es) played on unknown. Source:
Legend: Blue = home team win; Yellow = draw; Red = away team win.

Table

Pos.	Club	M	Home			Away			F	A	B	Pts	+/−
Pos.	Club	M	W	SHL	L	W	SHL	L	F	A	B	Pts	+/−
1	Glasgow Tigers (Q)	4	2	0	0	1	0	1	198	162	2	8	+36
2	Oxford Cheetahs	4	2	0	0	1	0	1	188	172	1	7	+16
3	Redcar Bears	4	0	0	2	0	0	2	154	206	0	0	-52

=== Grand final ===
First leg

9 October

Glasgow Tigers; Chris Harris 14; Benjamin Basso 10; Tom Brennan 9 Vadim Tarasenko 9 Lee Complin 9 Ace Pijper 1 Claus Vissing r/r	52–38	Poole Pirates; Richard Lawson 9 Steve Worrall 9 Zach Cook 8 Ben Cook 6 Kyle Newman 4 Joe Thompson 2 Anders Rowe r/r	Ashfield Stadium; Referee(s): David Watters

Second leg

11 October

Poole Pirates; Ben Cook 11; Steve Worrall 10; Zach Cook 8 Kyle Newman 8 Richard Lawson 7 Joe Thompson 3 Anders Rowe r/r	47–43	Glasgow Tigers; Chris Harris 14; Vadim Tarasenko 9 Tom Brennan 9 Benjamin Basso 5 Lee Complin 4 Ace Pijper 2 Claus Vissing r/r	Poole Stadium; Referee(s): David Watters

== Knockout Cup ==
The 2023 SGB Championship Knockout Cup was the 55th edition of the Knockout Cup for tier two teams and the 6th edition under the SGB Championship Knockout Cup name.

**Round One**
**Redcar Bears**	**53**	52	105
Berwick Bandits	37	**38**	75

**Quarter Finals**
**Redcar Bears**	**53**	48	101
Glasgow Tigers	37	**42**	79
Birmingham Brummies	**44**	29	73
**Scunthorpe Scorpions**	46	**61**	107
**Poole Pirates**	**54**	51	105
Plymouth Gladiators	36	**39**	75
**Oxford Cheetahs**	**54**	45	99
Edinburgh Monarchs	36	**45**	81

**Semi Finals**
Redcar Bears	36	**41**	77
**Scunthorpe Scorpions**	**54**	49	103
**Poole Pirates**	44	**52**	96
Oxford Cheetahs	**46**	38	84

**Final**
**Scunthorpe Scorpions**	**47**	45	92
Poole Pirates	43	**45**	88

Home team scores are in bold
Overall aggregate scores are in red

=== Final ===
First Leg

15 October

Scunthorpe Scorpions; Ryan Douglas 13; Drew Kemp 10; Michael Palm Toft 8 Jake Allen 6 Simon Lambert 6 Connor Mountain 3 Nathan Ablitt 1	47–43	Poole Pirates; Zach Cook 14; Richard Lawson 10; Ben Cook 6 Steve Worrall 6 Joe Thompson 4 Kyle Newman 3 Anders Rowe r/r	Eddie Wright Raceway; Referee(s): Michael Breckon

Second Leg

21 October

Poole Pirates; Richard Lawson 10; Ben Cook 8 Zach Cook 8 Kyle Newman 8 Steve Worrall 7 Joe Thompson 3 Anders Rowe 1	45–45	Scunthorpe Scorpions; Simon Lambert 12; Drew Kemp 10; Ryan Douglas 9 Connor Mountain 7 Jake Allen 4 Michael Palm Toft 3 Nathan Ablitt 0	Poole Stadium; Referee(s): Christina Turnbull

== BSN Series ==
Scottish Group

Fixtures

Home \ Away	BER	EDB	GLA
Berwick		51–39	38–51
Edinburgh	41–49		48–42
Glasgow	58–32	51–39	

Updated to match(es) played on unknown. Source:
Legend: Blue = home team win; Yellow = draw; Red = away team win.

Table

Pos.	Club	M	Home			Away			F	A	B	Pts	+/−
Pos.	Club	M	W	SHL	L	W	SHL	L	F	A	B	Pts	+/−
1	Glasgow Tigers **(Q)**	4	2	0	0	1	0	1	202	157	2	**8**	+45
2	Berwick Bandits	4	1	0	1	1	0	1	170	189	1	**5**	-19
3	Edinburgh Monarchs	4	1	0	1	0	0	2	167	193	0	**2**	-26

Northern Group

Fixtures

Home \ Away	BIR	RED	SCU
Birmingham		38–52	41–49
Redcar	49–41		49–41
Scunthorpe	55–35	50–40	

Updated to match(es) played on unknown. Source:
Legend: Blue = home team win; Yellow = draw; Red = away team win.

Table

Pos.	Club	M	Home			Away			F	A	B	Pts	+/−
Pos.	Club	M	W	SHL	L	W	SHL	L	F	A	B	Pts	+/−
1	Scunthorpe Scorpions **(Q)**	4	2	0	0	1	0	1	195	165	2	**8**	+30
2	Redcar Bears **(Q)**	4	2	0	0	1	0	1	190	170	1	**7**	+20
3	Birmingham Brummies	4	0	0	2	0	0	2	155	205	0	**0**	-50

Southern Group

Fixtures

Home \ Away	OXF	PLY	POL
Oxford		58–32	43–46
Plymouth	42–48		46–44
Poole	57–33	59–30	

Updated to match(es) played on unknown. Source:
Legend: Blue = home team win; Yellow = draw; Red = away team win.

Table

Pos.	Club	M	Home			Away			F	A	B	Pts	+/−
Pos.	Club	M	W	SHL	L	W	SHL	L	F	A	B	Pts	+/−
1	Poole Pirates **(Q)**	4	2	0	0	1	0	1	206	152	2	**8**	+54
2	Oxford Cheetahs	4	1	0	1	1	0	1	182	177	1	**5**	+5
3	Plymouth Gladiators	4	1	0	1	0	0	2	150	209	0	**2**	-59

=== Knockout stages ===
**Semi-finals**
Scunthorpe Scorpions	**44**	35	79
**Glasgow Tigers**	46	**55**	101
**Poole Pirates**	**48**	52	100
Redcar Bears	42	**38**	80

**Grand Final**
Glasgow Tigers	28	**48**	76
**Poole Pirates**	**62**	42	104

Home team scores are in bold
Overall aggregate scores are in red

=== Grand Final ===
First leg

5 July

Poole Pirates; Steve Worrall 14; Richard Lawson 13; Ben Cook 11; Zach Cook 8 Anders Rowe 7 Kyle Newman 5 Adam Roynon 4	62–28	Glasgow Tigers; Chris Harris 7 Benjamin Basso 7 Claus Vissing 5 Ace Pijper 5 Tom Brennan 4 Marcin Nowak 0 Lee Complin 0	Poole Stadium; Referee(s): Christina Turnbull

Second leg

21 July

Glasgow Tigers; Benjamin Basso 12; Tom Brennan 11; Marcin Nowak 8 Chris Harris 7 Lee Complin 6 Claus Vissing 3 Ace Pijper 1	48–42	Poole Pirates; Steve Worrall 12; Ben Cook 10; Richard Lawson 8 Kyle Newman 4 Adam Roynon 3 Anders Rowe 3 Zach Cook 2	Ashfield Stadium; Referee(s): Barbara Horley

== Pairs Championship ==
The 2023 edition of the SGB Championship Pairs took place on Friday 1 September, at Oxford Stadium, Oxford. It was won by Glasgow Tigers, who beat defending champions Redcar Bears in the final.

Qualifying heats

Pos	Team	Pts	Riders
1	Redcar Bears	25	Charles Wright 14, Danny King 11
2	Oxford Cheetahs	25	Lewis Kerr 15, Sam Masters 10
3	Glasgow Tigers	23	Chris Harris 12, Benjamin Basso 11
4	Poole Pirates	17	Ben Cook 11, Richard Lawson 6
5	Scunthorpe Scorpions	17	Ryan Douglas 13, Simon Lambert 4
6	Berwick Bandits	15	Jye Etheridge 8, Leon Flint 7
7	Edinburgh Monarchs	14	Josh Pickering 12, Luke Killeen 2
8	Birmingham Brummies	14	Justin Sedgmen 12, Troy Batchelor 2
9	Plymouth Gladiators	12	Kyle Howarth 8, Max Perry 4

Semi-finals

Team One	Team Two	Score	Result
Redcar	Poole	7-2	Wright 4, King 3, Lawson 2, Cook 0

Team One	Team Two	Score	Result
Glasgow	Oxford	5-4	Masters 4, Harris 3, Basso 2, Kerr 0

Final

Team One	Team Two	Score	Result
Glasgow	Redcar	6-3	Basso 4, Wright 3, Harris 2, King 0

== Riders' Championship ==
The 2023 edition of the SGB Championship Riders Championship was held on 27 August, at the Ecco Arena in Redcar. The event was won by Charles Wright on his home track.

Pos.	Rider	Pts	Total	SF	Final
1	(England) Charles Wright (Redcar)	1 2 2 3 3	11	2	3
2	(England) Chris Harris (Glasgow)	2 1 3 3 3	12	x	2
3	(Australia) Ben Cook (Poole)	3 2 3 3 2	12	x	1
4	(England) Danny King (Redcar)	3 3 2 2 2	12	3	0
5	(England) Lewis Kerr (Oxford)	3 1 3 2 1	10	1	
6	(England) Richard Lawson (Poole)	2 0 1 3 3	9	0	
7	(Australia) Ryan Douglas (Scunthorpe)	2 2 2 fx 2	8		
8	(England) Richie Worrall (Plymouth)	1 3 3 1 0	8		
9	(Australia) Rory Schlein (Berwick)	2 3 1 1 0	7		
10	(England) Leon Flint (Berwick)	0 3 2 2 0	7		
11	(Australia) Justin Sedgmen (Birmingham)	3 0 0 1 2	6		
12	(Australia) Jake Allen (Scunthorpe)	1 1 1 0 2	5		
13	(Italy) Paco Castagna (Edinburgh)	0 1 0 2 1	4		
14	(Australia) Troy Batchelor (Birmingham)	0 2 0 1 1	4		
15	(Australia) Kye Thomson (Edinburgh)	1 0 1 0 1	3		
16	(England) Craig Cook (Edinburgh)	r tm - - -	0		
17	(England) Luke Harrison (res)	0 0	0		
18	(England) Sam McGurk (res)	0 0	0		

- f=fell, r=retired, ex=excluded tm=two minute warning excluded

== Leading averages ==
	Rider	Team	Average
1	Ryan Douglas	Scunthorpe	10.09
2	Sam Masters	Oxford	9.80
3	Charles Wright	Redcar	9.66
4	Scott Nicholls	Oxford	9.54
5	Chris Harris	Glasgow	9.47
6	Benjamin Basso	Glasgow	9.45
7	Richard Lawson	Poole	9.37
8	Craig Cook	Edinburgh	9.08
9	Danny King	Redcar	8.58
10	Josh Pickering	Edinburgh	8.55

- averages include league, play offs, knockout cup & bsn series, min 6 matches

== Squads & final averages ==
Berwick Bandits

- (Australia) Rory Schlein 8.23
- (England) Leon Flint (C) 7.05
- (Australia) Jye Etheridge 6.41
- (Denmark) Thomas Jørgensen 6.23
- (Denmark) Jonas Knudsen 5.74
- (Denmark) Hans Andersen 5.38
- (Australia) Jacob Hook 4.85
- (England) Connor Coles 4.51
- (England) Steve Boxall 3.64
- (Scotland) Greg Blair 2.46
- (Wales) Nathan Stoneman 1.33

Birmingham Brummies

- (Australia) Justin Sedgmen (C) 7.74
- (Australia) Nick Morris 7.53
- (Australia) Troy Batchelor 7.35
- (England) Alfie Bowtell 5.43
- (England) Paul Starke 4.40
- (England) Stefan Nielsen 3.05
- (England) Sam Hagon 3.02
- (Australia) Ty Proctor 3.00
- (England) James Wright 2.86

Edinburgh Monarchs

- (England) Craig Cook 9.08
- (Australia) Josh Pickering (C) 8.55
- (Australia) Kye Thomson 6.57
- (Italy) Michele Paco Castagna 6.11
- (Norway) Lasse Fredriksen 4.71
- (Denmark) Bastian Borke 4.50
- (England) Kyle Bickley 3.39
- (England) Max Clegg 3.06
- (Australia) Dayle Wood 1.00

Glasgow Tigers

- (England) Chris Harris 9.47
- (Denmark) Benjamin Basso 9.45
- (Russia) / (Poland) Vadim Tarasenko 8.51
- (England) Tom Brennan (C) 7.91
- (Denmark) Claus Vissing 7.45
- (Poland) Marcin Nowak 6.37
- (England) Lee Complin 4.56
- (Scotland) Ace Pijper 3.18

Oxford Cheetahs

- (Australia) Sam Masters 9.80
- (England) Scott Nicholls (C) 9.54
- (England) Lewis Kerr 8.54
- (England) Jordan Jenkins 6.69
- (Australia) Cameron Heeps 5.71
- (England) Henry Atkins 4.70
- (England) Ashton Boughen 4.00
- (Australia) Luke Killeen 3.27
- (England) Ryan Kinsley 2.36

Plymouth Gladiators

- (England) Ben Barker 7.84
- (England) Richie Worrall 7.77
- (England) Kyle Howarth (C) 7.61
- (Australia) James Pearson 5.84
- (England) Dan Gilkes 5.79
- (England) Ben Morley 3.06
- (New Zealand) Jake Turner 2.49
- (England) Ben Trigger 2.07

Poole Pirates

- (England) Richard Lawson 9.37
- (England) Steve Worrall (C) 8.38
- (Australia) Ben Cook 8.29
- (Australia) Zach Cook 8.03
- (England) Anders Rowe 6.67
- (England) Kyle Newman 6.63
- (England) Adam Roynon 5.01
- (England) Joe Thompson 4.86

Redcar Bears

- (England) Charles Wright (C) 9.66
- (England) Danny King 8.58
- (Germany) Erik Riss 6.76
- (England) Jason Edwards 6.08
- (England) Danyon Hume 5.76
- (Australia) Connor Bailey 5.65
- (England) Jake Mulford 3.44

Scunthorpe Scorpions

- (Australia) Ryan Douglas 10.09
- (Australia) Jake Allen 7.94
- (Denmark) Michael Palm Toft 7.85
- (England) Simon Lambert (C) 7.04
- (England) Connor Mountain 6.69
- (England) Drew Kemp 6.64
- (England) Nathan Ablitt 3.13

== See also ==
- List of United Kingdom speedway league champions
- Knockout Cup (speedway)
