= SGB Premiership 2022 =

British motorcycle speedway season

- League: Premiership
- No. of competitors: 6
- Champions: Belle Vue Aces
- League Cup: Sheffield Tigers
- Pairs Championship: Ipswich Witches
- Highest average: Jason Doyle
- Division/s below: SGB Championship; NDL 2022

The 2022 SGB Premiership was the 87th season of the top tier of British speedway and the 5th known as the SGB Premiership. Sheffield Tigers topped the regular season table and met Belle Vue Aces in the play off final but Belle Vue ran out the winners to claim their 13th league title.

Locations of the 2022 SGB Premiership teams

== 2022 summary ==
The same six clubs as 2021 competed for the league championship, with Swindon once again sitting out due to the development of their stadium. The Rising Star scheme introduced in 2021, has been extended for the 2022 season, allowing clubs to select an additional Rising Star rider as a 'Number 8' for the season.

A new League Cup competition was introduced, with a regional group stage determining the finalists, the event was won by Sheffield Tigers. There was no place for the traditional Knockout Cup. Also re–introduced for the new season, was the SGB Premiership Pairs competition, but over six legs. The event was won by Ipswich Witches, with the sixth leg cancelled due to fixture congestion. However, the additional fixtures created an issue due to the suspension of fixtures during the Death and state funeral of Elizabeth II and the heavy rain during October. In retrospect additional events could have been added after the completion of the league and knockout cup fixtures.

Belle Vue brought in Robert Lambert as a late season injury replacement for Max Fricke and Lambert scored a 15-point maximum in the play off final 1st leg. The signing of Lambert was pivotal as Belle Vue held on to win the play offs on aggregate score, despite Sheffield winning the second leg. Sheffield gained some compensation for the defeat when easily beating King's Lynn in the League Cup final.

== Regular season ==
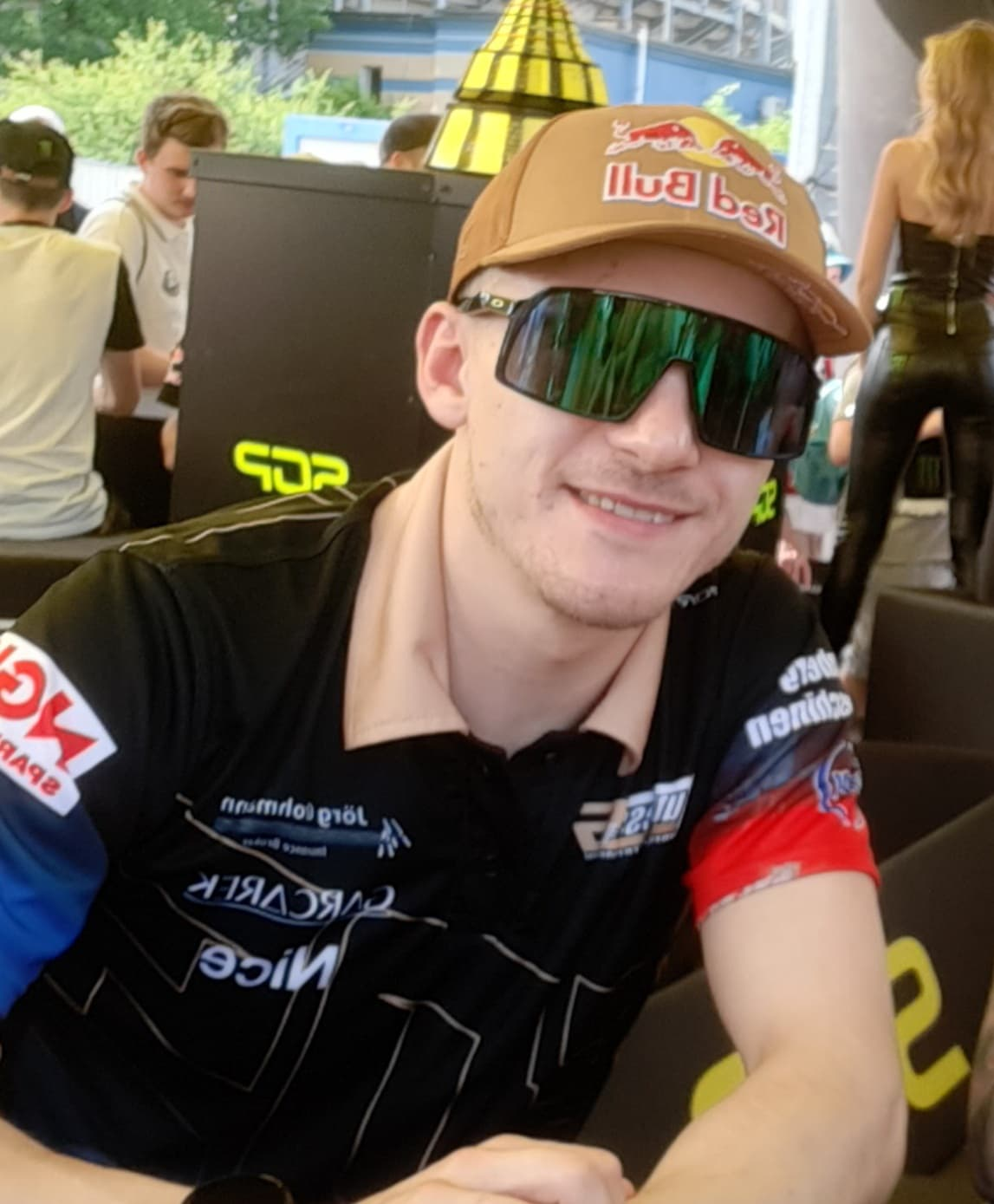
Robert Lambert was a controversial signing by Belle Vue towards the end of the season

File:Robert Lambert.jpg League Table

Pos.	Club	M	Home			Away					F	A	Pts	+/−
Pos.	Club	M	W	D	L	4W	3W	D	1L	L	F	A	Pts	+/−
1	Sheffield Tigers	20	10	0	0	2	2	1	1	3	913	845	46	+68
2	Ipswich Witches	20	8	1	1	0	4	1	1	4	892	895	43	-3
3	Belle Vue Aces	20	10	0	0	1	1	0	1	7	962	838	38	+124
4	Wolverhampton Wolves	20	8	0	2	1	1	1	3	5	907	893	34	+14
5	Kings Lynn Stars	20	6	0	4	1	0	0	5	4	901	899	27	+2
6	Peterborough Panthers	20	2	2	6	0	0	1	2	7	782	987	13	-205

A Fixtures

Home \ Away	BEL	IPS	KLN	PET	SHF	WOL
Belle Vue Aces		48–42	48–32	64–26	58–32	51–39
Ipswich Witches	47–43		46–44	45–45	43–47	46–44
Kings Lynn Stars	50–40	43–47		51–39	41–49	55–35
Peterborough Panthers	36–54	50–39	46–44		45–45	40–50
Sheffield Tigers	54–36	43–35	48–42	51–39		46–44
Wolverhampton Wolves	49–41	42–48	53–37	53–37	54–36	

Legend: Blue = home team win; Yellow = draw; Red = away team win.

B Fixtures

Home \ Away	BEL	IPS	KLN	PET	SHF	WOL
Belle Vue Aces		60–30	61–29	63–27	54–36	47–43
Ipswich Witches	50–40		46–44	46–44	54–36	53–37
Kings Lynn Stars	55–35	43–47		46–44	39–51	63–27
Peterborough Panthers	44–46	45–45	38–52		28–32	42–48
Sheffield Tigers	57–33	54–36	50–40	51–39		51–39
Wolverhampton Wolves	50–40	43–37	49–41	62–28	46–44	

Legend: Blue = home team win; Yellow = draw; Red = away team win.

League Scoring System

Extended content
- Home loss by any number of points = 0
- Home draw = (see Super Heat)
- Home win by any number of points = 3
- Away loss by 7 points or more = 0
- Away loss by 6 points or less = 1
- Away draw = (see Super Heat)
- Away win by between 1 and 6 points = 3
- Away win by 7 points or more = 4
- Super Heat win = 3
- Super Heat loss = 1

Super Heat

- In meetings after heat 15 when the score is level, a Super Heat will be used to determine the winner.
- The Team Manager, at their discretion may select any two of their seven riders.
- The Super Heat will take place with the following scoring system to determine the winner of the meeting: 1st 4 points, 2nd 3 points, 3rd 2 points, 4th 0 points.
- If a meeting is abandoned for any reason after the staging of heat 10, the scores are level and no more heats can take place (e.g. Super Heat), the match will be awarded. Each team will be awarded 2 points.

== Premiership play-offs ==
=== Draw ===
**Semi-finals**
1	**Sheffield Tigers**	47	**61**	108
4	Wolverhampton Wolves	**43**	29	72
3	**Belle Vue Aces**	52	**55**	107
2	Ipswich Witches	**38**	35	73

**Grand Final**
Sheffield Tigers	39	**50**	89
**Belle Vue Aces**	**51**	40	91

Home team scores are in bold
Overall aggregate scores are in red

=== Grand Final ===
First leg

10 October

Belle Vue Aces; Robert Lambert 15; Matej Žagar 10; Brady Kurtz 10; Tom Brennan 7 Norick Blödorn 6 Charles Wright 3 Jye Etheridge 0	51–39	Sheffield Tigers; Adam Ellis 8 Tobiasz Musielak 8 Lewis Kerr 7 Justin Sedgmen 7 Kyle Howarth 4 Connor Mountain 3 Jack Holder 2	National Speedway Stadium; Referee(s): Christina Turnbull

Second Leg

13 October

Sheffield Tigers; Tobiasz Musielak 10; Lewis Kerr 9 Jack Holder 9 Adam Ellis 6 Justin Sedgmen 6 Kyle Howarth 5 Connor Mountain 5	50–40	Belle Vue Aces; Robert Lambert 10; Tom Brennan 9 Norick Blödorn 7 Matej Žagar 7 Brady Kurtz 5 Simon Lambert (guest) 2 Rider replacement	Owlerton Stadium; Referee(s): Christina Turnbull

== League Cup ==
=== Group stages ===
Northern Group

Fixtures

Home \ Away	BEL	SHF	WOL
Belle Vue Aces		44–46	42–48
Sheffield Tigers	53–37		44–46
Wolverhampton Wolves	50–40	44–46	

Legend: Blue = home team win; Yellow = draw; Red = away team win.

Table

Pos.	Club	M	Home			Away					F	A	Pts	+/−
Pos.	Club	M	W	D	L	4W	3W	D	1L	L	F	A	Pts	+/−
1	Sheffield Tigers (Q)	4	1	0	1	0	2	0	0	0	189	171	9	+18
2	Wolverhampton Wolves	4	2	0	1	0	2	0	0	0	188	172	9	+14
3	Belle Vue Aces	4	0	0	2	0	0	0	0	2	163	197	0	-34

Southern Group

Fixtures

Home \ Away	IPS	KYN	PET
Ipswich Witches		44–46	40–50
Kings Lynn Stars	56–34		47–43
Peterborough Panthers	53–37	42–48	

Legend: Blue = home team win; Yellow = draw; Red = away team win.

Table

Pos.	Club	M	Home			Away					F	A	Pts	+/−
Pos.	Club	M	W	D	L	4W	3W	D	1L	L	F	A	Pts	+/−
1	Kings Lynn Stars (Q)	4	2	0	0	0	2	0	0	0	197	163	12	+34
2	Peterborough Panthers	4	1	0	0	1	1	0	1	0	188	172	8	+16
3	Ipswich Witches	4	0	0	2	0	0	0	0	2	155	205	0	-50

=== Final ===
The two group winners, the Kings Lynn Stars and the Sheffield Tigers both qualified for the final, which was won by Sheffield over two legs.

First Leg

17 October

King's Lynn Stars; Thomas Jørgensen 11; Frederik Jakobsen 9 Josh Pickering 7 Richie Worrall 6 Richard Lawson 5 Nicolai Klindt 2 Jason Edwards 0	39–51	Sheffield Tigers; Lewis Kerr 11; Jack Holder 11; Tobiasz Musielak 10; Adam Ellis 9 Justin Sedgmen 5 Connor Mountain 5 Kyle Howarth 2	Adrian Flux Arena; Referee(s): Wayne Jarvis

Second Leg

2 November

Sheffield Tigers; Adam Ellis 10; Tobiasz Musielak 9 Connor Mountain 9 Kyle Howarth 7 Sam Masters (guest) 7 Lewis Kerr 5 James Wright (guest) 3	50–34	King's Lynn Stars; Richard Lawson 14; Richie Worrall 9 Thomas Jorgensen 3 Frederik Jakobsen 3 Jason Edwards 3 Tom Brennan (guest) 2 Nicolai Klindt r/r	Owlerton Stadium; Referee(s): Chris Durno

== Pairs Championship ==
Each of the six Premiership club were supposed to have staged a round of the pairs championship at their track, with the highest placed side after the six rounds declared Premiership Pairs Champions but Ipswich were declared winners after only five rounds were held. Teams tracked two of their top four riders, plus the Rising Star as a reserve, at each meeting. The highest placed side after the qualifying heats qualified for the final, with second and third competing in the semi-final.

=== Standings ===
Pos	Team	R1	R2	R3	R4	R5	R6	Tot
1	Ipswich Witches	2	**12**	**12**	**12**	8	x	**46**
2	Belle Vue Aces	6	6	2	8	**12**	x	34
3	Kings Lynn Stars	**12**	4	6	4	0	x	26
4	Sheffield Tigers	8	8	8	0	2	x	26
5	Wolverhampton Wolves	4	0	0	6	4	x	14
6	Peterborough Panthers	0	2	4	2	6	x	14

red indicates home team, bold indicates winners

=== Rounds ===
Extended content

**Round One**

**Qualifying Heats**

Pos	Team	Pts
1	Sheffield Tigers	26
2	Belle Vue Aces	24
3	Kings Lynn Stars	23
4	Wolverhampton Wolves	23
5	Ipswich Witches	21
6	Peterborough Panthers	18

**Semi-final**

Team One	Team Two	Score	Result
Kings Lynn	Belle Vue	7-2	Pickering, Lawson, Kurtz, Fricke (F)

**Final**

Team One	Team Two	Score	Result
Kings Lynn	Sheffield	5-4	Holder, Lawson, Pickering, Ellis (Fx)

**Round Two**

**Qualifying Heats**

Pos	Team	Pts
1	Sheffield Tigers	29
2	Belle Vue Aces	24
3	Ipswich Witches	24
4	Kings Lynn Stars	23
5	Peterborough Panthers	21
6	Wolverhampton Wolves	14

**Semi-final**

Team One	Team Two	Score	Result
Ipswich	Belle Vue	6-3	Doyle, Zagar, Batchelor, Kurtz

**Final**

Team One	Team Two	Score	Result
Ipswich	Sheffield	6-3	Doyle, Ellis, Batchelor, Musielak

**Round Three**

**Qualifying Heats**

Pos	Team	Pts
1	Ipswich Witches	27
2	Kings Lynn Stars	27
3	Sheffield Tigers	23
4	Peterborough Panthers	21
5	Belle Vue Aces	20
6	Wolverhampton Wolves	17

**Semi-final**

Team One	Team Two	Score	Result
Sheffield	Kings Lynn	6-3	Holder, Pickering, Ellis, Lawson

**Final**

Team One	Team Two	Score	Result
Ipswich	Sheffield	5-4	Holder, Doyle, King, Ellis

**Round Four**

**Qualifying Heats**

Pos	Team	Pts
1	Belle Vue Aces	31
2	Ipswich Witches	27
3	Wolverhampton Wolves	24
4	Kings Lynn Stars	21
5	Peterborough Panthers	20
6	Sheffield Tigers	12

**Semi-final**

Team One	Team Two	Score	Result
Ipswich	Wolverhampton	6-3	Doyle, Masters, Hume, Batchelor (X/2 Mins), Morris (FX)

**Final**

Team One	Team Two	Score	Result
Ipswich	Belle Vue	7-2	Doyle, Batchelor, Fricke, Kurtz

== Leading averages ==
	Rider	Team	Average
1	Jason Doyle	Ipswich	10.15
2	Sam Masters	Wolverhampton	9.14
3	Tobiasz Musielak	Sheffield	8.86
4	Max Fricke	Belle Vue	8.62
	Matej Žagar	Belle Vue	8.62
6	Brady Kurtz	Belle Vue	8.59
7	Jack Holder	Sheffield	8.56
8	Chris Harris	Peterborough	8.30
9	Niels Kristian Iversen	King's Lynn	8.10
10	Adam Ellis	Sheffield	7.97

- averages include league, play offs & league cup, min 6 matches

== Squads & final averages ==
=== Belle Vue Aces ===
- (Australia) Max Fricke 8.96
- (Australia) Brady Kurtz (C) 8.76
- (Slovenia) Matej Žagar 8.41
- (England) Charles Wright 7.25
- (England) Tom Brennan (Rising Star) 6.43
- (Australia) Jye Etheridge 5.89
- (Germany) Norick Blödorn 5.09
- (England) Robert Lambert n/a

=== Ipswich Witches ===
- (Australia) Jason Doyle 10.53
- (Australia) Rohan Tungate 7.83
- (Australia) Troy Batchelor 6.98
- (England) Danny King (C) 6.93
- (Germany) Erik Riss 6.64
- (Australia) Aaron Summers 6.00
- (England) Ben Barker 5.25
- (England) Danyon Hume (Number 8) 5.65
- (England) Anders Rowe (Rising Star) 5.14
- (England) Paul Starke 4.00

=== King's Lynn Stars ===
- (Denmark) Nicolai Klindt 8.32
- (Denmark) Niels Kristian Iversen 8.00
- (Australia) Josh Pickering (C) 7.45
- (Denmark) Frederik Jakobsen 7.45
- (England) Richard Lawson 7.35
- (Denmark) Thomas Jørgensen 7.03
- (England) Richie Worrall 6.83
- (England) Lewis Kerr 5.16
- (England) Jason Edwards (Rising Star) 3.39
- (England) Jack Thomas (Number 8) 2.78

=== Peterborough Panthers ===
- (England) Chris Harris 8.14
- (Denmark) Benjamin Basso 6.91
- (Denmark) Michael Palm Toft 6.81
- (Denmark) Hans Andersen 5.73
- (England) Scott Nicholls (C) 5.62
- (Denmark) Ulrich Østergaard 5.53
- (England) Jordan Jenkins (Rising Star) 2.77
- (England) Jordan Palin 1.88
- (England) Jake Mulford (Number 8) 0.44

=== Sheffield Tigers ===
- (Poland) Tobiasz Musielak 9.04
- (Australia) Jack Holder 8.67
- (England) Adam Ellis 7.57
- (England) Kyle Howarth (C) 6.77
- (England) Craig Cook 6.00
- (England) Lewis Kerr 5.56
- (England) Connor Mountain (Rising Star) 5.26
- (England) Stefan Nielsen 3.56
- (Australia) Justin Sedgmen 4.75
- (England) Dan Thompson (Number 8) 2.67
- (Australia) Jake Allen 2.40

=== Wolverhampton Wolves ===
- (Australia) Sam Masters (C) 9.10
- (Australia) Ryan Douglas 8.23
- (England) Steve Worrall 7.79
- (United States) Luke Becker 7.60
- (Australia) Nick Morris 7.33
- (England) Leon Flint (Rising Star) 4.25
- (England) Drew Kemp 3.65
- (England) Joe Thompson (Number 8) 2.00

== See also ==
- SGB Championship 2022
- SGB National Development League 2022
- British Speedway League Champions
