= SGB Premiership 2021 =

British motorcycle speedway season

- League: SGB Premiership
- Champions: Peterborough Panthers
- Knockout Cup: not held
- Highest average: Dan Bewley
- Division/s below: SGB Championship 2021; NDL 2021

The 2021 British Speedway Premiership League was the 86th season of the top division of British Speedway, called the Premiership in 2021. The 2020 season had been lost to the COVID-19 pandemic.

Six teams participated.

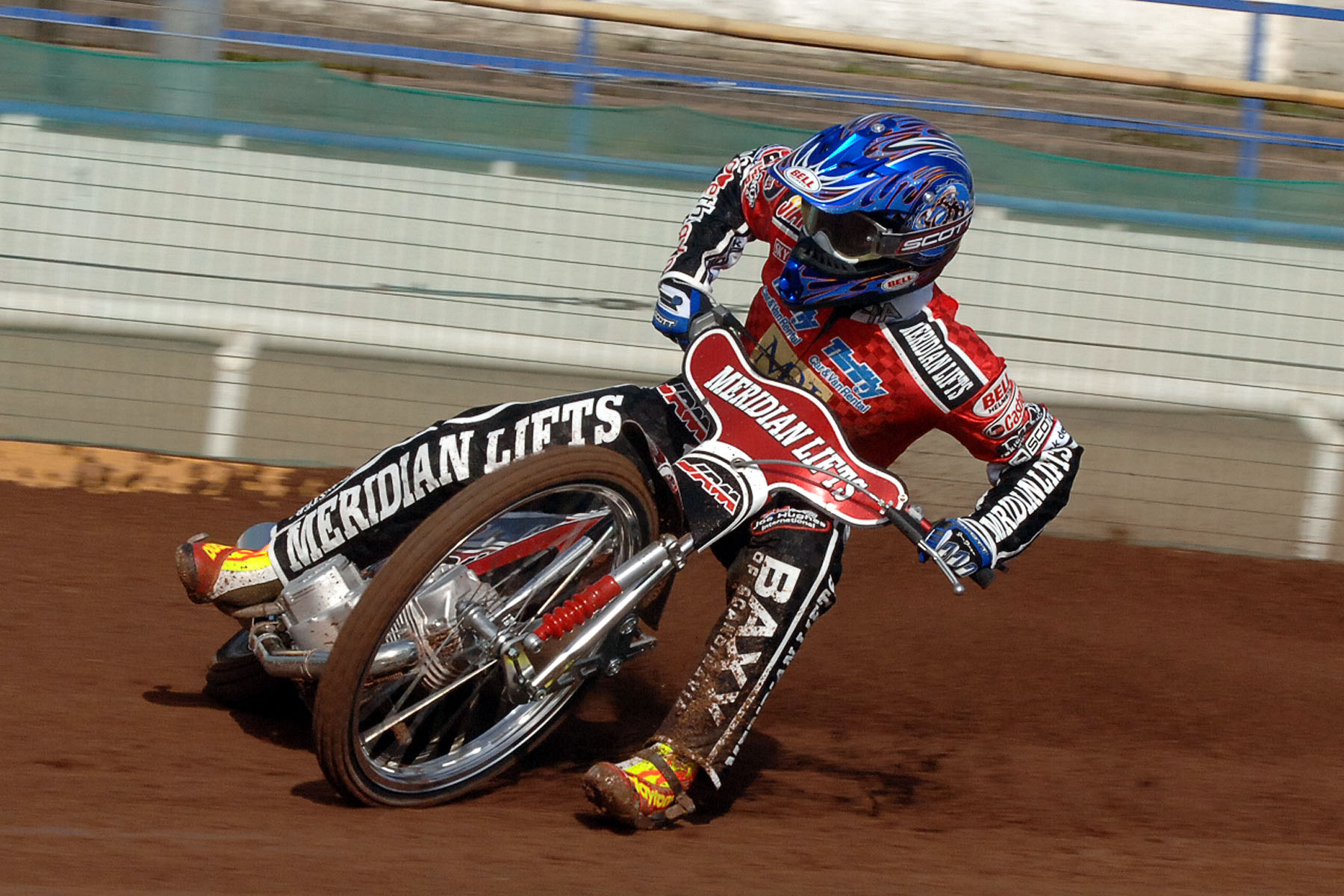
Hans Andersen was one of the Peterborough riders in the 'Dad's Army'.

== Team changes ==
Changes from the 2019 league season saw the Swindon Robins (the 2019 champions) not fielding a team due to the uncertainty surrounding the Abbey Stadium. The Poole Pirates dropped down to the next league down, the SGB Championship but Sheffield Tigers joined the league after previously competing in the SGB Championship 2019.

The league started on 17 May and race meetings were covered by Eurosport. Peterborough Panthers finished top of the regular season table by just one point, overtaking the long time leaders Wolverhampton Wolves. By virtue of finishing top they elected to play Wolves in the play off semi finals rather than the third or fourth placed teams Belle Vue and Sheffield. Peterborough then deservedly won the playoffs by beating Wolverhampton in the semifinals and Belle Vue in the final.

The Peterborough team gained the nickname the 'Dad's Army' due to the fact that four of their riders were aged 40 or older.

Locations of the 2021 SGB Premiership teams

== Regular season ==
Pos	Team	P	W	D	L	4W	3W	D	1L	L	F	A	Pts
1	Peterborough Panthers	20	7	0	3	5	3	1	1	0	974	826	53
2	Wolverhampton Wolves	20	9	0	1	5	1	1	0	3	976	824	52
3	Belle Vue Aces	20	6	1	3	3	0	1	4	2	929	870	37
4	Sheffield Tigers	20	7	0	3	3	0	1	2	4	905	895	37
5	Ipswich Witches	20	3	1	6	0	2	0	2	6	819	981	18
6	King's Lynn Stars	20	1	2	7	0	1	0	3	6	796	1003	11

A Fixtures

Home \ Away	BEL	IPS	KLN	PET	SHF	WOL
Belle Vue Aces		55–35	48–42	45–45	47–43	40–50
Ipswich Witches	45–45		44–46	41–49	51–39	41–49
Kings Lynn Stars	38–51	43–47		36–54	41–49	32–58
Peterborough Panthers	40–50	47–43	58–32		54–36	51–39
Sheffield Tigers	46–44	48–42	46–44	40–50		49–41
Wolverhampton Wolves	48–42	62–28	52–38	47–43	50–40	

Legend: Blue = home team win; Yellow = draw; Red = away team win.

B Fixtures

Home \ Away	BEL	IPS	KLN	PET	SHF	WOL
Belle Vue Aces		55–35	49–41	43–47	54–36	41–49
Ipswich Witches	48–42		46–44	37–53	41–49	36–54
Kings Lynn Stars	46–44	42–48		44–46	45–45	45–45
Peterborough Panthers	38–52	55–35	58–32		39–51	49–41
Sheffield Tigers	49–41	52–38	61–29	40–50		44–46
Wolverhampton Wolves	49–41	52–38	54–36	42–48	48–42	

Legend: Blue = home team win; Yellow = draw; Red = away team win.

League scoring system

- Home loss by any number of points = 0
- Home draw = 1
- Home win by any number of points = 3
- Away loss by 7 points or more = 0
- Away loss by 6 points or less = 1
- Away draw = 2
- Away win by between 1 and 6 points = 3
- Away win by 7 points or more = 4

== Play-offs ==
=== Draw ===
**Semi Finals**
1	Wolverhampton Wolves	**44**	38	82
4	Peterborough Panthers	46	**52**	98
3	Sheffield Tigers	**40**	42	82
2	Belle Vue Aces	50	**48**	98

**Grand Final**
Peterborough Panthers	44	**51**	95
Belle Vue Aces	**46**	39	85

Home team scores are in bold
Overall aggregate scores are in red

=== Grand final ===
First leg

10 October

Belle Vue Aces; Dan Bewley 15; Steve Worrall 13; Charles Wright 7 Richie Worrall 6 Tom Brennan 4 Jye Etheridge 1 Brady Kurtz R/R	46–44	Peterborough Panthers; Scott Nicholls 14; Chris Harris 10; Bjarne Pedersen 8 Michael Palm Toft 6 Jordan Palin 5 Lewis Kerr (guest) 1 Hans Andersen R/R	National Speedway Stadium

Second leg

14 October

Peterborough Panthers; Bjarne Pedersen 13; Michael Palm Toft 12; Scott Nicholls 10; Chris Harris 7 Craig Cook (guest) 5 Jordan Palin 4 Ulrich Østergaard R/R	51–39	Belle Vue Aces; Dan Bewley 15; Tom Brennan 11; Steve Worrall 5 Jye Etheridge 3 Richie Worrall 3 Charles Wright 2 Brady Kurtz R/R	East of England Showground

== Teams & final averages ==
=== Belle Vue Aces ===
- (England) Dan Bewley 9.52
- (Australia) Brady Kurtz 7.83
- (England) Richie Worrall 7.09
- (England) Steve Worrall 7.07
- (England) Charles Wright 6.94
- (Australia) Jye Etheridge 5.92
- (England) Tom Brennan 4.41
- (Denmark) Nikolaj Busk Jakobsen 4.00

=== Ipswich Witches ===
- (England) Danny King 8.49
- (England) Craig Cook 7.36
- (Australia) Cameron Heeps 6.77
- (Australia) Jason Crump 5.75
- (England) Paul Starke 5.57
- (Australia) Jake Allen 5.29
- (England) Anders Rowe 4.96
- (England) Drew Kemp 3.95
- (Australia) Jordan Stewart 1.33

=== King's Lynn Stars ===
- (England) Richard Lawson 8.62
- (England) Lewis Kerr 6.48
- (Denmark) Thomas Jørgensen 6.46
- (Denmark) Kasper Andersen 5.85
- (England) Craig Cook 5.78
- (England) Ben Barker 5.40
- (Germany) Erik Riss 5.35
- (Australia) Cameron Heeps 5.30
- (United States) Ricky Wells 4.59
- (England) Connor Mountain 3.93
- (Australia) Ty Proctor 3.40
- (England) Lewis Bridger 3.20
- (England) Ryan Kinsley 2.80

=== Peterborough Panthers ===
- (Denmark) Ulrich Østergaard 8.73
- (Denmark) Michael Palm Toft 8.04
- (Denmark) Hans Andersen 7.92
- (England) Chris Harris 7.71
- (England) Scott Nicholls 7.56
- (Denmark) Bjarne Pedersen 7.14
- (England) Jordan Palin 3.41

=== Sheffield Tigers ===
- (Australia) Jack Holder 9.44
- (England) Adam Ellis 8.81
- (Australia) Josh Pickering 8.31
- (England) Kyle Howarth 7.03
- (Denmark) Stefan Nielsen 7.00
- (Australia) Troy Batchelor 6.29
- (Australia) Justin Sedgmen 4.67
- (England) Danyon Hume 3.87
- (England) James Wright 3.38
- (England) Josh Bates 2.67

=== Wolverhampton Wolves ===
- (Australia) Sam Masters 8.94
- (Australia) Nick Morris 8.15
- (Australia) Rory Schlein 8.06
- (United States) Luke Becker 7.96
- (Australia) Ryan Douglas 7.63
- (England) Leon Flint 3.85
- (United States) Broc Nicol 5.93
- (England) Tom Bacon 2.40

== Knockout Cup ==
It was announced that the Premiership Supporters Cup would not be held during 2021.

== See also ==
- List of United Kingdom speedway league champions
- Knockout Cup (speedway)
