= Magnus Karlsson (speedway rider) =

Swedish speedway rider

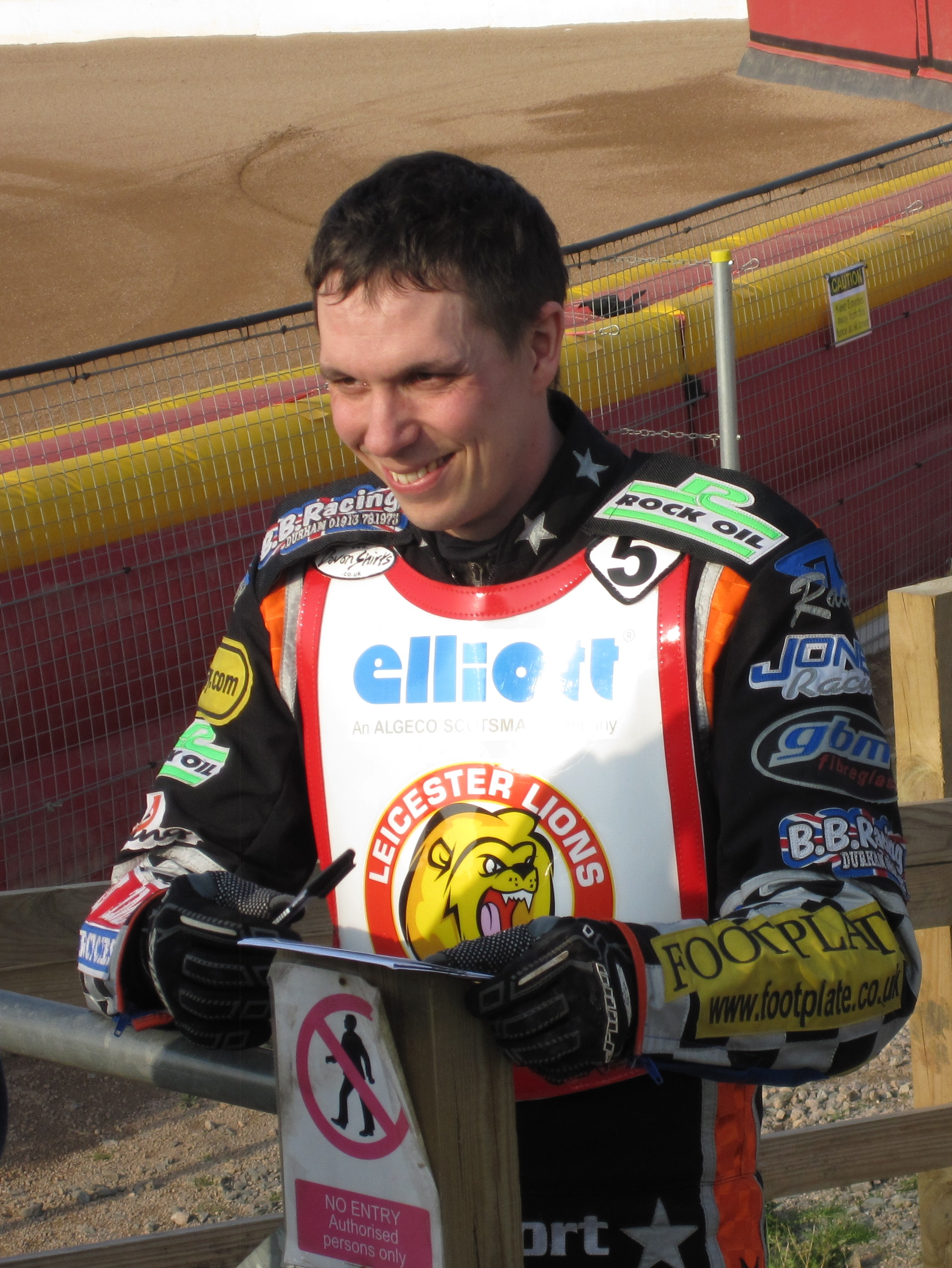
- Born: 28 December 1981 (age 44); Gullspång, Sweden
- Nationality: Swedish

Career history

Sweden
- 2001: Karlstad
- 2002: Valsarna
- 2003: Kaparna
- 2014: Vetlanda
- 2015: Örnarna
- 2016: Dackarna

Great Britain
- 2002-2003: Edinburgh Monarchs
- 2004: Hull Vikings
- 2003-2007: Wolverhampton Wolves
- 2008-2010: Scunthorpe Scorpions
- 2011-2012, 2013: Leicester Lions

Poland
- 2008: Łódź
- 2014: Kraków

Team honours
- 2003, 2004: Premier League Champion
- 2004: Premier KO Cup Winner
- 2004: Young Shield Winner
- 2003: Swedish Elitserien Champion

Magnus Erik Karlsson (born 28 December 1981) is a Swedish former motorcycle speedway rider. He earned one cap for the Sweden national speedway team.

== Family ==
His two older brothers, Peter Karlsson and Mikael Max are both former Speedway Grand Prix riders. All three brothers represented Sweden in the 2007 Speedway World Cup, with Magnus riding at reserve.

== Career ==
Karlsson had a successful start to his British career. He first rode in the Premier League in 2002 with the Edinburgh Monarchs, and in 2003, he was part of the Premier League Championship winning team. He joined Wolverhampton Wolves in 2003.

In 2004, Karlsson moved on to the Hull Vikings, and was part of the team that won the League Championship, KO Cup and Young Shield treble. He decided to join his brother Peter at Elite League Wolverhampton Wolves in 2005 where he recorded a 5.58 average in his debut season, including a paid maximum. In 2006, his average dropped to 4.71 and it dropped again in 2007 to 3.62, despite representing Sweden in the Speedway World Cup.

Karlsson decided to drop down to the Premier League with Scunthorpe Scorpions in 2008 and produced his best-ever season at that level with the Scorpions in 2009. He rode for the Lincolnshire club for a third consecutive season in 2010, before moving to Leicester Lions in 2011, initially on loan but later becoming a club asset. His final season with Leicester was in 2013 and his final season in Poland was with Wanda Kraków in 2014.
