= Byron Bekker =

South African speedway rider

- Born: 2 July 1987 (age 39); Johannesburg, South Africa
- Nationality: South African

Career history

Great Britain
- 2005: Newcastle Gems
- 2007: Berwick Bandits
- 2008-2009: Scunthorpe Scorpions
- 2009, 2011-2012: Edinburgh Monarchs
- 2010: Weymouth Wildcats

Team honours
- 2007: Conference League Fours

Byron Anthony Bekker (born 2 July 1987, in Johannesburg) is a South African former motorcycle speedway rider, who rode in the British Premier League.

== Career ==
Bekker left South Africa aged 17, leaving Johannesburg for Coulby Newham in the Borough of Middlesbrough.

Bekker started his British racing career in 2005 with Newcastle Gems where he rode seven meetings. He was quickly offered a contract with the clubs Premier League team, Newcastle Diamonds. However, with the Gems not having a team in the following season, he was sent to ride for Scunthorpe Scorpions in the Conference League to gain further experience. He made his debut at Sittingbourne Crusaders where he claimed a four ride paid maximum. The following weekend, he scored eight on his home debut and five at Newport in two narrow victories. He was also three times within one point of a maximum around the Scunthorpe Raceway whilst his 8+3 points from five rides at Stoke Spitfires helped the club to a close one-point victory.

Bekker rode in all 28 meetings that remained during the 2005 season and in the 2006 season he was the only ever-present in the side when his average (CMA) moved up to 6.67 from all meetings. He collected two maxima at home, against Newport and Weymouth Wildcats.

Bekker scored sixteen points at the Norfolk Arena in King's Lynn as the Scorpions won the Lincolnshire Cup against Boston Barracudas.

Bekker was part of the Scunthorpe team that won the Conference League Four-Team Championship, held on 18 May 2007 at Plymouth Coliseum. While a Weymouth Wildcats rider in 2010, he dislocated a shoulder that then required pinning, which forced him to miss the remainder of the season. However, he returned to ride Edinburgh Monarchs in 2011.
