= Viktor Bergström =

Swedish speedway rider

- Born: 14 November 1986 (age 39); Kolmården, Sweden
- Nationality: Swedish
- Website: www.bergstromspeedway.se

Career history

Sweden
- 2003, 2015: Vargarna

Great Britain
- 2008-2011: Scunthorpe Scorpions
- 2011: Leicester Lions

Poland
- 2007: Rawicz

Viktor Bergström (born 14 November 1986 in Kolmården) is a former motorcycle speedway rider from Sweden.

== Career ==
Bergström raced in Britain in the Premier League for Leicester Lions and Scunthorpe Scorpions.

In 2007, Bergström rode in the Elitserien, the top league in Sweden, at reserve for Västervik and the team finished second in the league. His teammates included Bjarne Pedersen, Tomasz Gollob and Chris Harris with Bergström recording a 5.45 average. In the Allsvenskan league, the second tier in Sweden, he rode for Vargarna and averaged 7.25.

Bergström also gained experience with Kolejarz Rawicz in Poland, winning the Polish second division. He also qualified for his fourth Swedish Under-21 individual Final, finishing tenth. He was also placed tenth in the Nordic final and in his last meeting of the season he claimed third place in the Robins individual meeting.

From 2008, Bergström rode for the Scunthorpe Scorpions in Britain and embarked on his third season with the club in 2010. In August 2011, he joined Leicester Lions on loan.

== Career details ==
=== World championships ===
- Individual U-21 World Championship
  - 2007 - 10th place in Qualifying round 2

=== European championships ===
- Individual European Championship
  - 2007 - 10th place in Semi-Final B
- European Pairs Championship
  - 2007 - 5th place in Semi-Final 1

== See also ==
- Speedway in Sweden
- Sweden national speedway team
