= Kyle Howarth =

British speedway rider (born 1994)

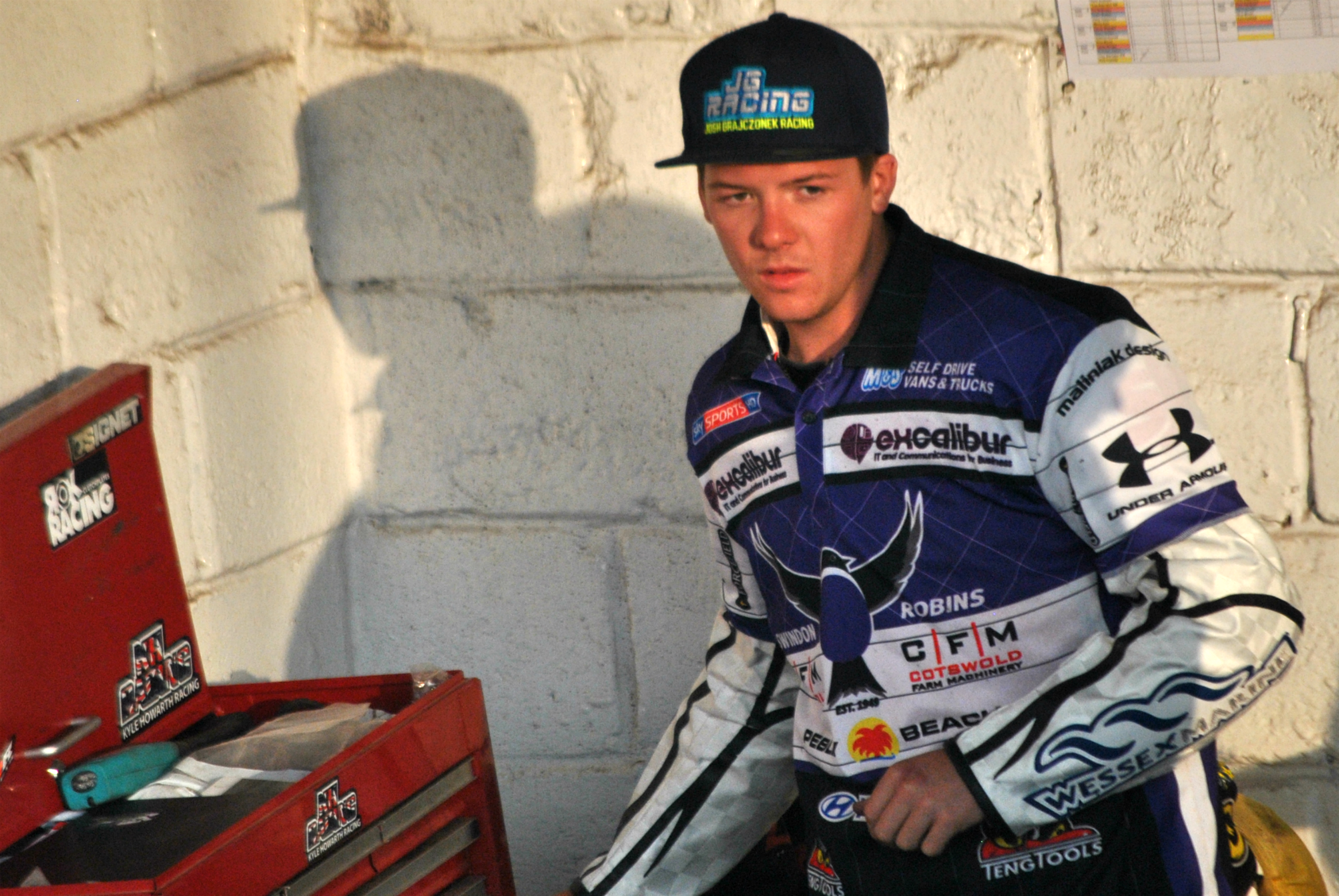
- Born: 11 February 1994 (age 32); Ashton-under-Lyne, Greater Manchester
- Nationality: British (English)

Career history

Great Britain
- 2009, 2024: Scunthorpe
- 2010: Bournemouth
- 2011: Edinburgh
- 2011: Belle Vue
- 2012–2015: Workington
- 2012: Poole
- 2012: King's Lynn
- 2013, 2015: Swindon
- 2014: Coventry
- 2016–2019: Wolverhampton
- 2016–2024: Sheffield
- 2020–2022, 2025: Leicester
- 2023: Plymouth
- 2025: Glasgow

Poland
- 2024: Gniezno

Individual honours
- 2015: British Under-21 Champion

Team honours
- 2023: SGB Premiership
- 2024, 2025: Premiership Knockout Cup
- 2017, 2018: Championship Pairs
- 2022: League Cup

Kyle Howarth (born 11 February 1994) is a British motorcycle speedway rider.

== Biography ==
Born in Ashton-under-Lyne, Greater Manchester, Howarth competed in grasstrack and motocross before starting his speedway career in 2008 in amateur competitions, gaining a National League place with Scunthorpe Saints in 2009, scoring 13+2 on his debut. He averaged 4.62 over the season and finished as runner up in the British Under-15 championship that year. In 2010, he became a Poole Pirates asset and rode for Bournemouth Buccaneers in the National League, averaging 7.43, and also made guest appearances in the Premier League for Somerset Rebels. Also in 2010, he finished in third place in the British Under-18 Championship. In 2011 he rode in the National League for Belle Vue Colts, and he also rode for Edinburgh Monarchs in the Premier League, averaging 5.11, and was named at number eight for the Belle Vue Aces Elite League team. He spent the winter riding in Australia, and won the Queensland Under-21 Championship.

In 2012, after initially signing for King's Lynn Stars, he rode for Poole in the Elite League and Workington Comets in the Premier League, and signed for both teams in 2013. He finished in third place in the 2012 British Under-21 Championship and represented Great Britain at under-21 level.

From 2013 until 2020, Howarth rode for numerous clubs including Swindon Robins, Workington, Poole Pirates and Coventry Bees. He joined Sheffield Tigers and Wolverhampton Wolves in 2016, staying with both clubs until 2020. As a Sheffield rider he won the SGB Championship Pairs, partnering Lasse Bjerre, during the SGB Championship 2017 season. and then the following season won it again partnering Charles Wright, during the SGB Championship 2018 season.

In 2021 and 2022, Howarth returned to Sheffield in the SGB Premiership 2021 and SGB Premiership 2022 and signed for the Leicester Lions in the SGB Championship 2021 and SGB Championship 2022. He helped Sheffield win the 2022 League cup and reach the Play off final.

In 2023, Howarth re-signed for Sheffield for the SGB Premiership 2023 and won the league title with the club. He also signed for Plymouth Gladiators for the SGB Championship 2023. In 2024, he re-signed for Sheffield and re-signed for Scunthorpe (his first club) for the 2024 Championship season, winning the Knockout Cup with the Tigers during his testimonial year for the club.

Howarth returned to Leicester for the SGB Premiership 2025 and signed for Glasgow Tigers for the SGB Championship 2025. In 2025, he helped Leicester defeat King's Lynn to win the Knockout Cup.
