= Scunthorpe Scorpions =

British motorcycle speedway team

Club information
- Track address: Eddie Wright Raceway; Normanby Road; Scunthorpe; North Lincolnshire; DN15 8QZ
- Country: England
- Founded: 1972
- Promoter: Rob Godfrey
- Team manager: David Howe
- League: SGB Championship; National Development League
- Website: scunthorpe-speedway.com

Club facts
- Colours: White and Red
- Track size: 285 metres (312 yd)
- Track record time: 55.18 seconds
- Track record date: 5 September 2014
- Track record holder: Nicolai Klindt

Current team
Rider	CMA
(Australia) Josh Pickering
(Denmark) Michael Palm Toft
(England) Connor Mountain
(England) Luke Harrison
(England) Nathan Ablitt
(England) Ryan Ingram

Major team honours
Premier League Champions	2012
Championship KO Cup	2023
Conference League Champions	2006, 2007
Conference League KO Cup Winners	2006, 2007
Conference Trophy Winners	2006, 2007
Conference Shield Winners	2006
Conference Fours Winners	2007
Conference League Pairs Winners	2006

The Scunthorpe Scorpions are a motorcycle speedway team in the British SGB Championship. They have raced at various times since 1971, at three different venues.

== History ==
=== Origins and 1970s ===
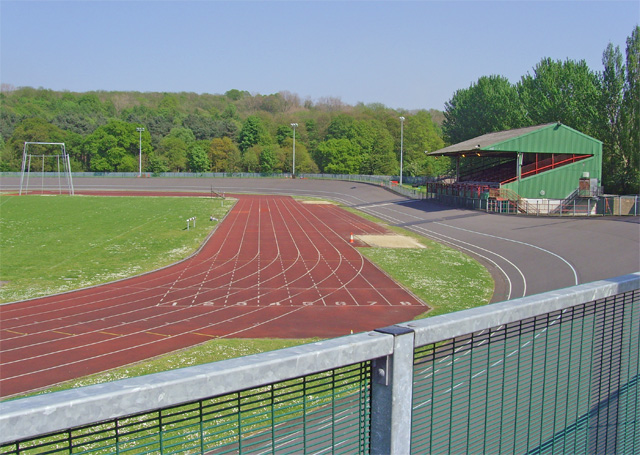
Scunthorpe's first home, the Quibell Stadium

Speedway in Scunthorpe began on 3 May 1971 at the Quibell Park Stadium (an athletics stadium and velodrome). The inaugural season consisted primarily of a team known as the Scunthorpe Saints, who raced a series of challenge meetings at the stadium.

The following year in 1972, the team joined the British league system, when they competed in the 1972 British League Division Two season but finished bottom of the table. Changes were made for 1973, with promoter Brian Osborn bringing in multiple new signings including Ken McKinlay. The Saints continued to race in the second tier of British speedway, which from 1975 was known as the National League. However, the seasons were disappointing with the team struggling at the foot of the table.

Major changes took place during 1979, the first being a change of venue to Ashby Ville Stadium. Promoter Brian Osborn was forced to find a new home following issues with the athletics club and North Lincolnshire council over track conditions. In conjunction with the move, the Saints also changed their name from the Saints to the Stags.

=== 1980s ===
The team continued to compete in the second division and continued to produce moderate results, only managing a best finish of 5th place during the 1983 National League season. Riders came and went and in the Summer of 1984 the promotion was taken over by Tony Nicholls, who had plans to expand Ashby Ville.

For the start of the 1985 season, Eric Boothroyd was brought in as the new team manager. Events began to deteriorate when the captain Rob Woffinden was injured and the team suffered heavy losses. Tony Nicholls then revealed financial losses and the team were disbanded in May 1985.

=== 2000s ===
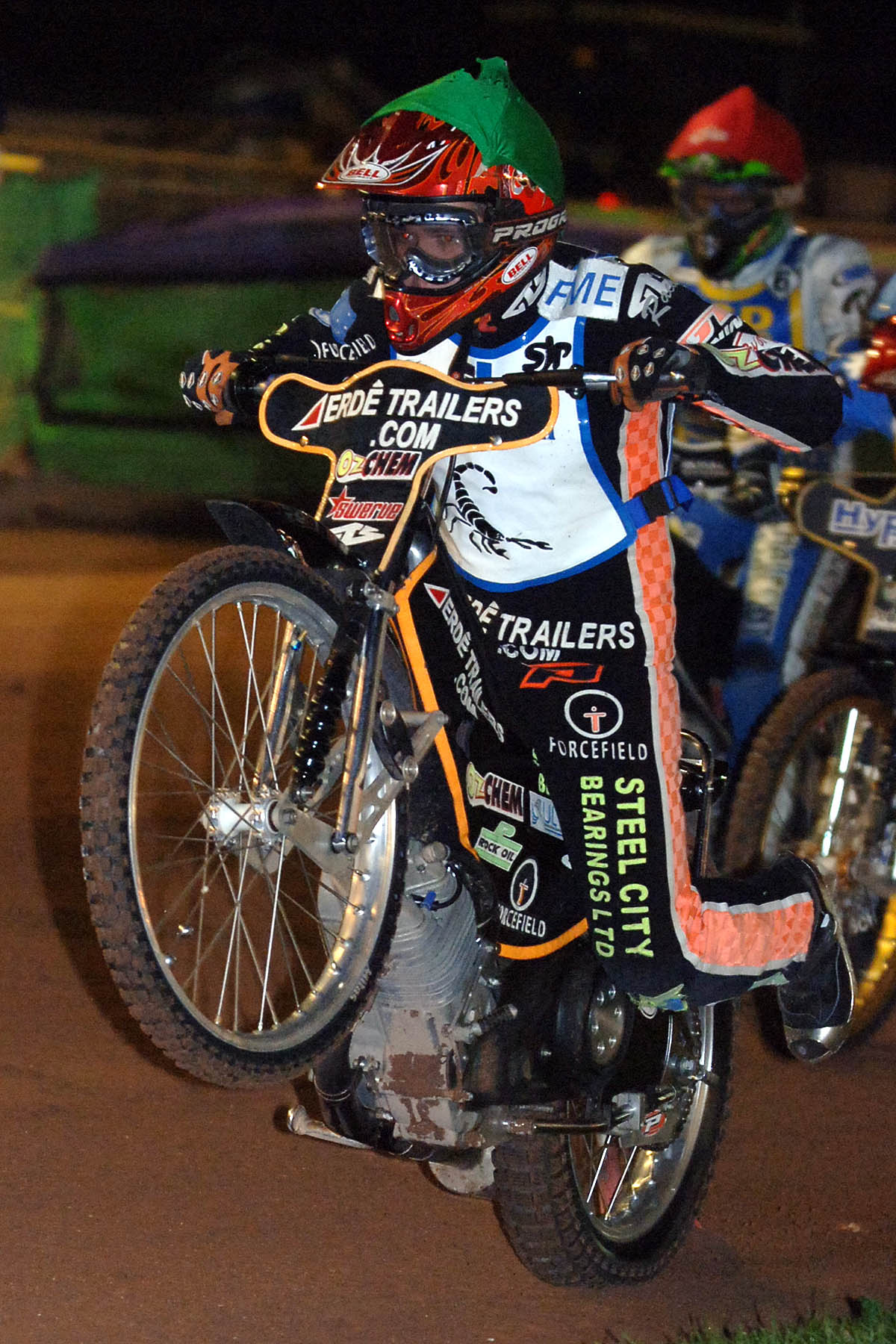
Woffinden riding for Scunthorpe in 2007

A team known as the Scunthorpe Scorpions appeared in a couple of fixtures during 2003, which subsequently led to a search for a track. The North Lincolnshire Council offered a 10-acre plot of land on Normanby Road and work began on creating a new venue. Promoters Rob Godfrey and Norman Beeney opened the track for practice in 2004 before the first meeting was held on 27 March 2005, ending a twenty-year absence. The Scorpions took their place in division 3 (the 2005 Speedway Conference League).

The following season the Scorpions signed Tai Woffinden and Josh Auty and the Scorpions won their first silverware, winning the playoffs after finishing second in the regular season table. The team also won the Knockout Cup to win the double, in addition to the Conference Trophy and pairs championship. The 2007 Speedway Conference League resulted in a second successive league and cup double, the Conference Trophy and fours event. The team was inspired by Tai Woffinden, who would later become a three times world champion.

After three successful years in the Conference League the side were accepted into the Premier League (division 2) for 2008, but lost Tai Woffinden to Rye House. However they did achieve a mid-table finish in 2008 and 2009. The club also introduced a junior side called the Saints (after the original name of the club) who would continue riding in the Conference League and later the National League with the main aim to develop riders for the Premier League side.

=== 2010s ===
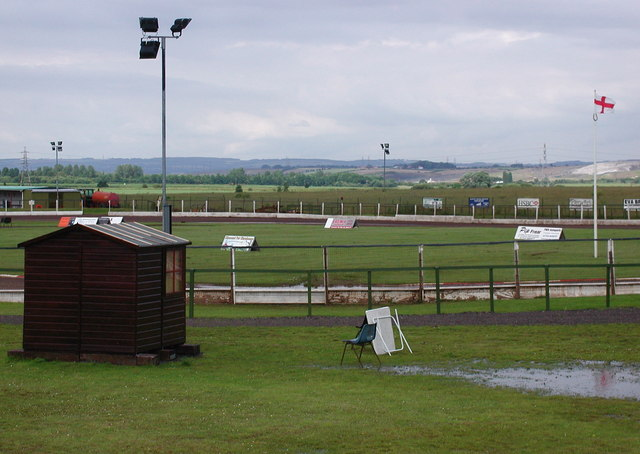
The new venue at Normanby Road

In 2012, the Scorpions won their highest honour to date, winning the 2012 Premier League after defeating the Somerset Rebels 92-91 on aggregate in the play off final. The team included Nick Morris, Josh Auty, Thomas Jørgensen, David Howe and Michael Palm Toft. In 2017, the Premier League became the SGB Championship.

=== 2020s ===
Following a season lost to the COVID-19 pandemic, the Scorpions continued to race in the second tier Championship, entering their 15th season in the division in 2023.

In 2023, spearheaded by Ryan Douglas, the Scorpions created a shock by winning the SGB Championship Knockout Cup, defeating favourites Poole Pirates 92-88 on aggregate in the final.

== Season summary (1st team) ==
Extended content

Year and league	Position	Notes
1972 British League Division Two season	17th	Saints
1973 British League Division Two season	16th	Saints
1974 British League Division Two season	17th	Saints
1975 New National League season	13th	Saints
1976 National League season	17th	Saints
1977 National League season	14th	Saints
1978 National League season	19th	Saints
1979 National League season	19th	Stags
1980 National League season	13th	Stags
1981 National League season	17th	Stags
1982 National League season	17th	Stags
1983 National League season	5th	Stags
1984 National League season	10th	Stags
2005 Speedway Conference League	8th	Scorpions
2006 Speedway Conference League	2nd	Scorpions, Champions (PO winners) & Knockout Cup winners
2007 Speedway Conference League	1st	Scorpions, Champions & Knockout Cup winners
2008 Premier League speedway season	10th	Scorpions
2009 Premier League speedway season	10th	Scorpions
2010 Premier League speedway season	9th	Scorpions
2011 Premier League speedway season	7th	Scorpions
2012 Premier League speedway season	2nd	Scorpions, Champions (PO winners)
2013 Premier League speedway season	8th	Scorpions
2014 Premier League speedway season	5th	Scorpions
2015 Premier League speedway season	11th	Scorpions
2016 Premier League speedway season	11th	Scorpions
SGB Championship 2017	9th	Scorpions
SGB Championship 2018	9th	Scorpions
SGB Championship 2019	7th	Scorpions
SGB Championship 2021	6th	Scorpions
SGB Championship 2022	7th	Scorpions
SGB Championship 2023	4th	Scorpions, Play offs & Knockout Cup winners
SGB Championship 2024	3rd	Scorpions
SGB Championship 2025	9th	Scorpions

== Season summary (junior team) ==
Extended content

Year and league	Position	Notes
2008 Speedway Conference League	5th	Saints
2009 National League speedway season	6th	Saints
2010 National League speedway season	8th	Saints
2011 National League speedway season	1st	Scunthorpe & Sheffield Saints, Champions
2012 National League speedway season	6th	Saints
2014 National League speedway season	9th	Stags
2024 National Development League speedway season	5th	Scunthorpe/Sheffield

== Riders previous seasons ==
Extended content

2007 team

- (England) Richie Dennis
- (England) Josh Auty
- (England) Tai Woffinden
- (Scotland) Andrew Tully
- (England) Benji Compton
- (South Africa) Byron Bekker
- (England) Scott Richardson
- (England) Joe Haines
- (England) Scott Anderson
- (England) James Cockle

2008 team

- (Sweden) Viktor Bergström
- (England) Richard Hall
- (Sweden) Magnus Karlsson
- (South Africa) Byron Bekker
- (England) Carl Wilkinson
- (England) Benji Compton
- (England) Andrew Moore
- (Australia) Ben Powell
- (Argentina) Emiliano Sanchez

2008 team (juniors)

- (South Africa) Byron Bekker
- (England) Scott Richardson
- (England) Scott Anderson
- (England) Jonathan Bethell
- (England) Gary Irving
- (England) Adam Wrathall
- (England) Michael Pickering
- (England) Ricky Scarboro
- (England) Stuart Parnaby
- (England) Ben Hopwood

2009 team

- (England) David Howe
- (Sweden) Magnus Karlsson
- (England) Carl Wilkinson
- (England) Simon Lambert
- (Sweden) Viktor Bergström
- (England) Ritchie Hawkins
- (England) Jerran Hart

Also rode:

- (South Africa) Byron Bekker
- (England) Nick Simmons
- (England) Adam Allott

2009 team (juniors)

- (South Africa) Byron Bekker
- (England) Adam Wrathall
- (England) Gary Irving
- (England) James Sarjeant
- (England) Richard Franklin
- (England) Scott Richardson
- (England) Kyle Howarth
- (England) Ashley Morris
- (England) Stuart Parnaby

2010 team

- (England) David Howe
- (Sweden) Magnus Karlsson
- (England) Carl Wilkinson
- (Australia) Joel Parsons
- (Sweden) Viktor Bergström
- (England) Simon Lambert
- (England) Jerran Hart

Number eight rider:

- (England) Gary Irving

2015 team

- (Czech Republic) Zdenek Holub
- (Sweden) Andreas Lyager
- (England) Carl Wilkinson
- (Netherlands) Theo Pijper
- (England) Leigh Lanham
- (Australia) Alex Davies
- (Finland) Nike Lunna

2016 team

- (Australia) Ryan Douglas
- (England) Josh Auty
- (England) Carl Wilkinson
- (Denmark) Michael Palm Toft
- (England) Lewis Kerr
- (Austria) Fritz Wallner
- (England) Josh Bailey

Also rode:

- (Denmark) Nicolai Klindt
- (Czech Republic) Zdenek Holub
- (Australia) Alex Davies
- (Sweden) Andreas Lyager
- (England) Ashley Morris

2017 team

- (Australia) Ryan Douglas
- (England) Josh Auty
- (England) Carl Wilkinson
- (Denmark) Michael Palm Toft
- (England) Lewis Kerr
- (Austria) Fritz Wallner
- (England) Josh Bailey

Also rode:

- (England) Stefan Nielsen

Replaced the injured Fritz Wallner

2019 team

- (England) Josh Auty
- (Australia) Jake Allen
- (England) Ben Barker
- (England) Danny Ayres
- (England) Stefan Nielsen
- (England) Simon Lambert
- (England) Ryan Kinsley

2021 team

- (Australia) Jake Allen
- (Australia) Ryan Douglas
- (England) Simon Lambert (C)
- (England) Jordan Palin
- (England) Adam Roynon
- (England) Anders Rowe
- (England) James Wright

Also Rode:

- (Finland) Tero Aarnio
- (England) Connor Coles
- (Australia) Zaine Kennedy
- (England) Ryan Kinsley

2022 team

- (Australia) Jake Allen
- (Australia) Ryan Douglas
- (England) Simon Lambert (C)
- (England) Jordan Palin
- (England) Adam Roynon
- (England) Anders Rowe
- (England) James Wright

Also Rode:

- (Finland) Tero Aarnio
- (England) Connor Coles
- (Australia) Zaine Kennedy
- (England) Ryan Kinsley

2023 team

- (England) Nathan Ablitt
- (Australia) Jake Allen
- (Australia) Ryan Douglas
- (England) Drew Kemp
- (England) Simon Lambert (C)
- (England) Connor Mountain
- (Denmark) Michael Palm Toft

Also Rode:

- (England) Max Clegg
- (Australia) Zaine Kennedy
- (England) Joe Thompson

== Notable riders ==
- (England) Josh Auty
- (Australia) Ryan Douglas
- (England) David Howe
- (Denmark) Michael Palm Toft
- (England) Rob Woffinden
- (England) Tai Woffinden

== Other honours ==
- Lincolnshire Cup Winners: 2005, 2006 & 2007
- Easter Cup Winners: 2006
- Humber Bridge Trophy Winners: 2005
