= Ryan Douglas =

Australian speedway rider (born 1993)

- Born: 9 September 1993 (age 33); Brisbane, Australia
- Nationality: Australian

Career history

Great Britain
- 2013–2017, 2022–2023: Scunthorpe Scorpions
- 2019–2021, 2024–2025: Leicester Lions
- 2019–2023: Wolverhampton Wolves

Poland
- 2021–2023: Rawicz
- 2024–2026: Poznań
- 2027-: Polonia Bydgoszcz

Sweden
- 2024: Dackarna
- 2025: Rospiggarna

Individual honours
- 2020, 2023: Queensland Solo Champion
- 2021: South Australian Champion

Team honours
- 2025: Premiership KO Cup
- 2019: SGB Championship
- 2019: Championship Shield
- 2023: Championship KO Cup
- 2026: World team champion

Ryan Douglas (born 9 September 1993) is an Australian speedway rider.

== Career ==
Born in Brisbane, Douglas made his British league debut with Scunthorpe Scorpions in the Premier League, going on to spend five seasons with the club, becoming the team's number one rider in 2016. He finished as runner-up to Max Fricke in the Australian Under-21 Solo Championship in 2014. After failing to gain a seven-point average in 2017, he had to miss the 2018 British season as he was unable to get a visa to ride in the UK.

In June 2018, Douglas represented Queensland in a State of Origin meeting against New South Wales. He gained UK visa qualification again in October 2018 after finishing as runner-up in the Victorian Solo Championship at Mildura, and in November 2018 was signed by Leicester Lions for their 2019 SGB Championship team, also signing during the 2019 season for SGB Premiership team Wolverhampton Wolves.

In November 2019, Douglas won the Queensland Solo Championship. In 2022, he rode for the Wolverhampton Wolves in the SGB Premiership 2022 and for the Scunthorpe Scorpions in the SGB Championship 2022.

In 2023, Douglas signed for the fifth consecutive season for Wolves for the SGB Premiership 2023 season. He also re-signed for Scunthorpe for the SGB Championship 2023 and during his last season with the club he helped the team win the Knockout Cup.

Following the demise of Wolverhampton, Douglas was able to re-join Leicester for the 2024 season. In 2025, he helped Leicester defeated King's Lynn to win the Knockout Cup.
