= Nick Morris (speedway rider) =

Australian motorcycle racer

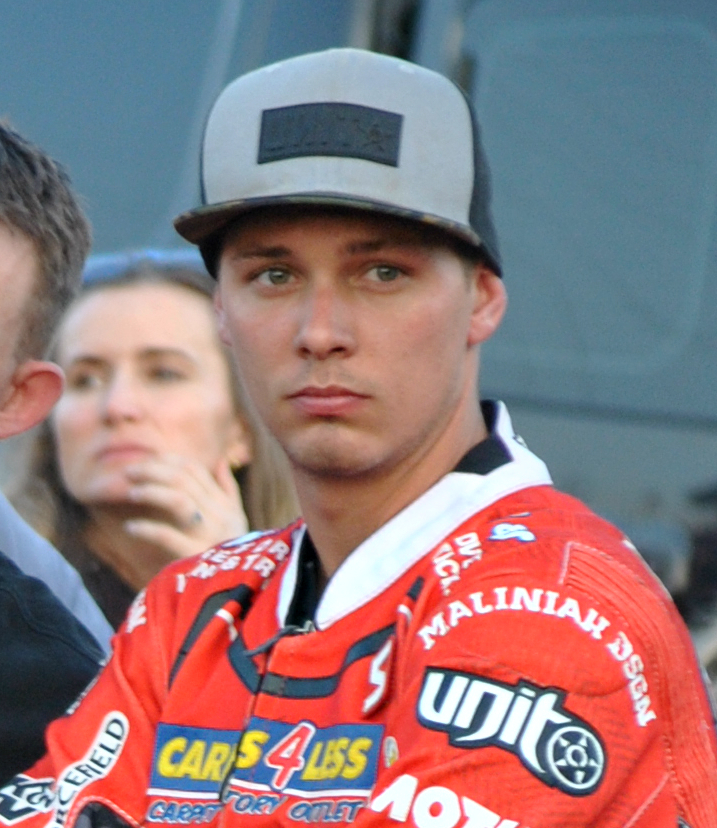
- Born: 7 June 1994 (age 32); Canberra, Australia
- Nationality: Australian

Career history

Great Britain
- 2010: Buxton Hitmen
- 2010–2011, 2015: Glasgow Tigers
- 2011: Coventry Bees
- 2012–2018: Swindon Robins
- 2012: Scunthorpe Scorpions
- 2013–2014, 2019: Somerset Rebels
- 2017, 2025: Berwick Bandits
- 2018: Lakeside Hammers
- 2019–2022: Wolverhampton Wolves
- 2020–2023: Leicester Lions
- 2023: Birmingham Brummies

Poland
- 2016: Wrocław
- 2017-2018: Rzeszów
- 2019: Rybnik
- 2022-2023: Daugavpils

Denmark
- 2015: Munkebo
- 2017, 2023: Grindsted
- 2022: Region Varde

Individual honours
- 2017: SGB Championship Riders' Champion
- 2022: Queensland State Champion
- 2022: Olympique

Team honours
- 2010: National League
- 2011, 2012: Premier League
- 2012: Elite League
- 2017: SGB Premiership
- 2014: Premier League Fours

Nicholas Craig Morris (born 7 June 1994) is an Australian speedway rider.

== Career ==
Born in Canberra, Morris was successful as a youngster in youth racing in Australia before making the move into British racing in 2010 with Buxton Hitmen in the National League, the team going on to be crowned champions. It was the only season that Morris would race in the National League, making the step up to the Premier League and the Elite League in 2011.

Morris won titles with Glasgow Tigers and Scunthorpe Scorpions in the Premier League. Morris rode for Swindon Robins from 2012 to 2018, in the Elite League and won the 2012 Elite League with Swindon.

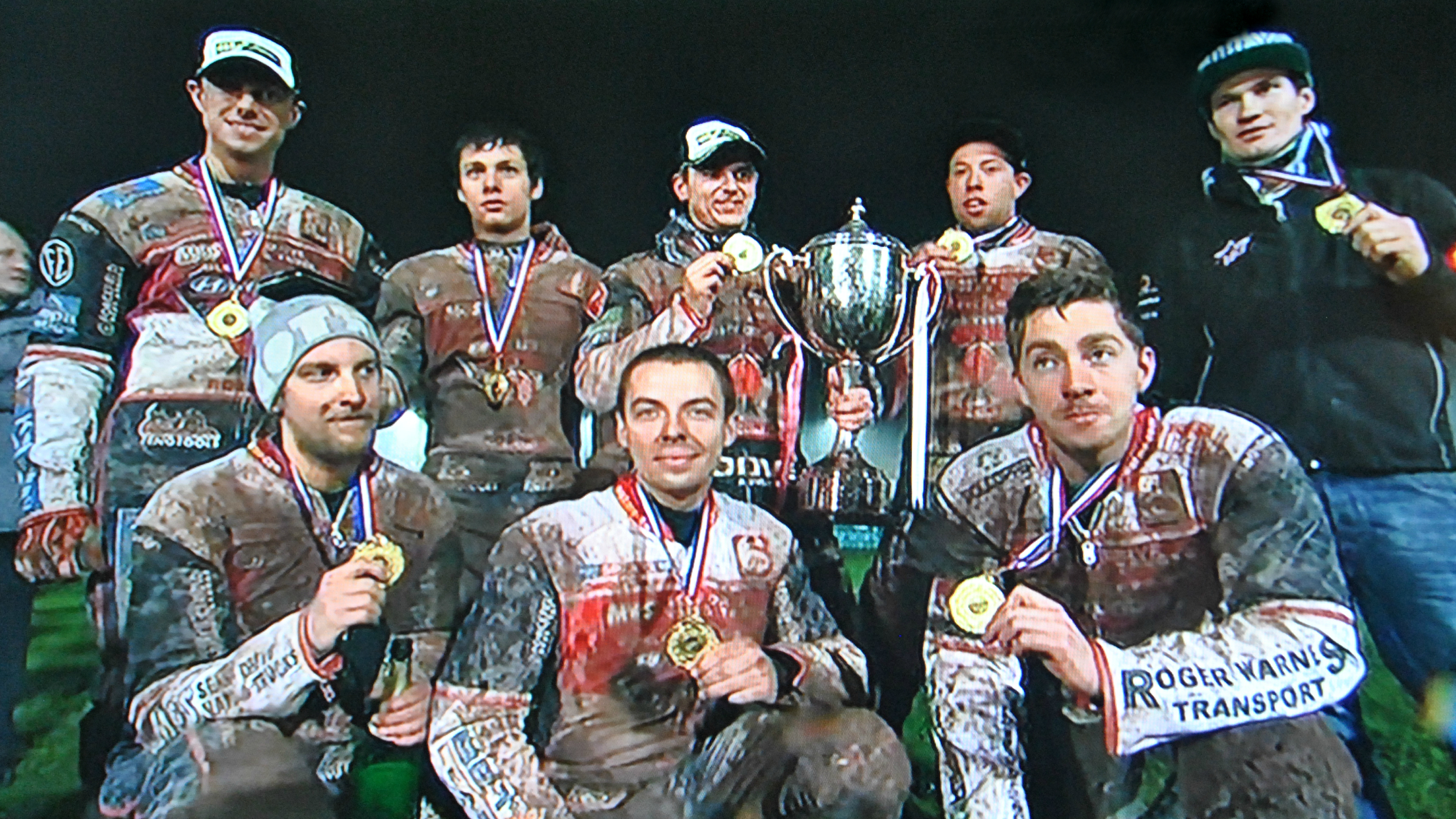
Morris (back, 2nd from left) celebrating the league win with Swindon in 2012

He doubled up for Somerset Rebels during the 2014 season and was part of the Somerset team that won the Premier League Four-Team Championship, which was held on 3 August 2014, at the East of England Arena.

In 2017, Morris won the SGB Premiership Riders' Championship as a Swindon rider.

During the SGB Premiership 2018 while riding for Swindon, Morris was the team captain under manager Alun Rossiter. He also rode for Lakeside Hammers in the SGB Championship 2018. The following season, he rode for Wolverhampton and Somerset respectively.

In 2021 and 2022, Morris rode for the Wolverhampton Wolves in the SGB Premiership 2021 and SGB Premiership 2022 and for the Leicester Lions in the SGB Championship 2021 and SGB Championship 2022, he topped the Leicester averages during both seasons. In late 2022, he won the Olympique.

In 2023, Morris stayed with Leicester as they moved up a division to the SGB Premiership 2023. This resulted in his time at Wolves coming to an end and his signing for Birmingham Brummies for the SGB Championship 2023. In August 2023, he was banned for two years after failing to comply with an anti-doping test.

Following the completion of his doping ban, Morris returned to speedway and signed with the Berwick Bandits for the latter half of the 2025 SGB Championship season in England.

== World Final appearances ==
=== Under-21 World Cup ===
- 2012 – (Poland) Gniezno, Stadion Startu Gniezno – 2nd – 44pts (11)
- 2015 – (Australia) Mildura, Olympic Park Speedway – 3rd – 29pts (12)

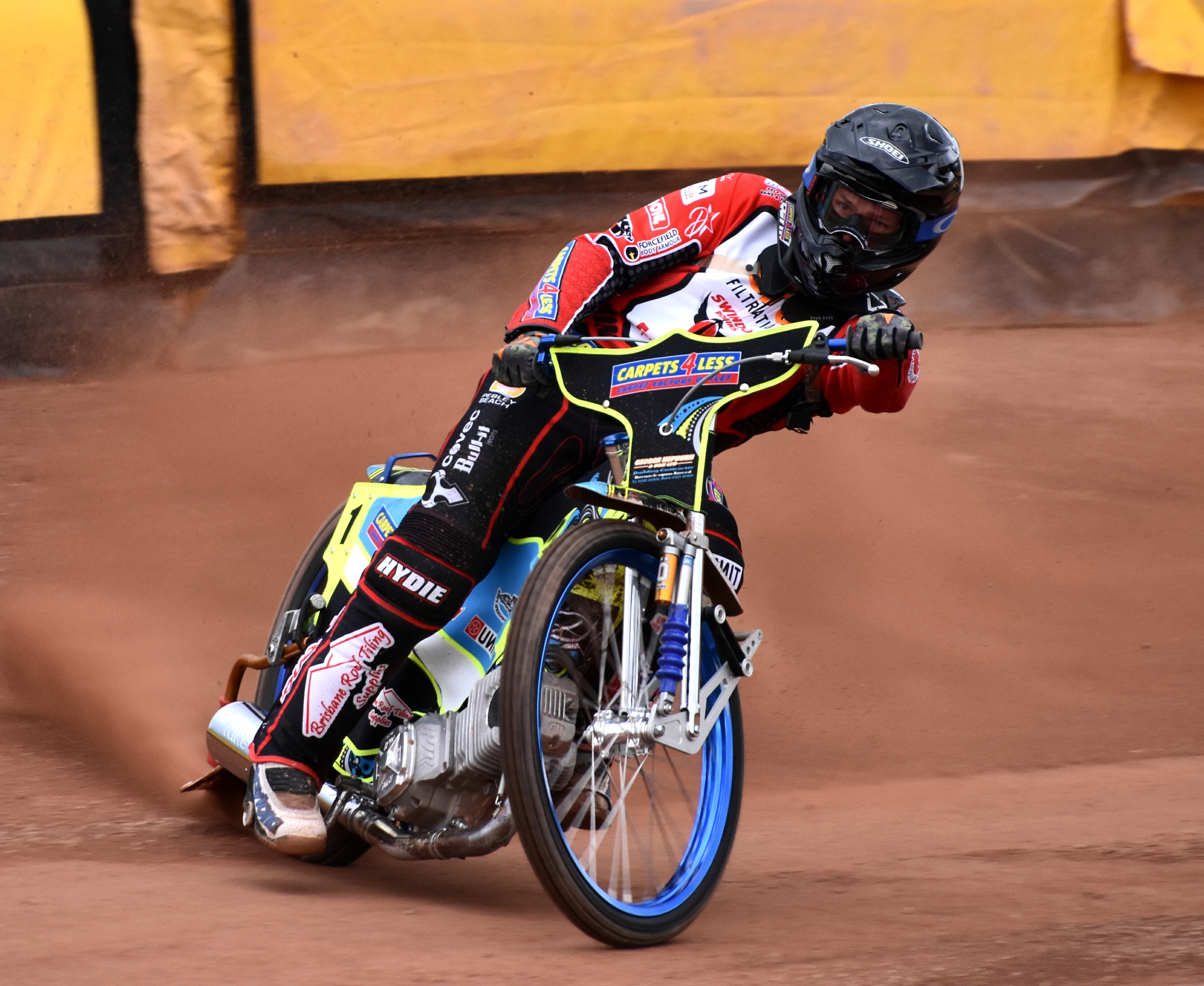
Nick Morris
