= Connor Mountain =

British motorcycle speedway rider (born 1997)

- Born: 26 August 1997 (age 29); King's Lynn, Norfolk
- Nationality: British (English)

Career history

Great Britain
- 2015: Coventry
- 2015, 2021: Newcastle
- 2016-2018: Ipswich
- 2018: Swindon
- 2018, 2019, 2022: Leicester
- 2018, 2022: Sheffield
- 2021: King's Lynn
- 2023–2025: Scunthorpe
- 2024: Belle Vue

Team honours
- 2022: SGB Premiership League Cup
- 2023: Championship Knockout Cup

Connor Reece Mountain (born 26 August 1997) is a British motorcycle speedway rider.

== Career ==
Mountain began his British speedway career riding for Coventry Bees in 2015.

In 2018, Mountain won the silver medal behind Robert Lambert in the British Speedway Under 21 Championship.

In 2021, Mountain rode in the top tier of British Speedway, riding for the King's Lynn Stars in the SGB Premiership in addition to riding for the Newcastle Diamonds in the SGB Championship.

In 2022, Mountain rode for the Sheffield Tigers in the Premiership and for the Leicester Lions in the Championship. He helped Sheffield win the League cup and reach the Play off final.

In 2023, Mountain signed for Scunthorpe Scorpions for the SGB Championship 2023, where he helped the team win the Knockout Cup.

Mountain signed for Belle Vue Aces for the 2024 Premiership, and re-signed for Scunthorpe for the 2024 Championship.
