= Michael Palm Toft =

Danish speedway rider (born 1990)

- Born: 26 July 1990 (age 36); Odense, Denmark
- Nationality: Danish

Career history

Denmark
- 2008–2009, 2013–2017: Esbjerg
- 2010–2011, 2023: Outrup/Region Varde
- 2012: Fjelsted
- 2018: Holsted

Great Britain
- 2011–2013 2015–2017, 2023–2024 2026: Scunthorpe
- 2012, 2017–2019, 2023–2024: King's Lynn
- 2013, 2022: Plymouth
- 2014: Belle Vue
- 2015–2016, 2018 2021–2022: Peterborough
- 2017: Somerset
- 2018: Leicester
- 2018–2021: Redcar
- 2025: Edinburgh

Poland
- 2023: Piła

Team honours
- 2021: tier 1 league champion
- 2012: tier 2 league champion
- 2023: Championship Knockout Cup
- 2018: SGB Championship Fours

Michael Palm Toft (born 26 July 1990) is a Danish motorcycle speedway rider.

== Career ==
Palm Toft began his British career riding for the Scunthorpe Scorpions in 2011. The following year, he helped Scunthorpe win the 2012 Premier League title In 2017, he captained Scunthorpe for the season.

Palm Toft was part of the Peterborough Panthers team that won the SGB Championship Fours, which was held on 1 July 2018, at the Media Prime Arena.

In 2021, Palm Toft rode in the top tier of British Speedway, riding for the Peterborough Panthers in the SGB Premiership 2021, in addition to the Redcar Bears in the SGB Championship 2021. He rode at No 1 in the Peterborough team that won the SGB Premiership 2021.

In 2022, Palm Toft rode for the Peterborough again, in the SGB Premiership 2022 and for the Plymouth Gladiators in the SGB Championship 2022. In 2023, he returned to two previous clubs signing for King's Lynn Stars for the SGB Premiership 2023 and the Scunthorpe Scorpions for the SGB Championship 2023, where he helped the team win the Knockout Cup.

Palm Toft re-signed for King's Lynn for 2024 Premiership, and Scunthorpe for the Championship season but had a setback in June when he broke his collarbone riding for Scunthorpe at Berwick and subsequently required surgery.

In June 2025, Palm Toft was brought into the Edinburgh Monarchs team.
