= Ryan Kinsley =

English speedway rider

- Born: 25 September 1998 (age 28); Norwich, Norfolk
- Nationality: British (English)

Career history
- 2015-2017, 2021: King's Lynn Stars
- 2017: Buxton Hitmen
- 2018-2019, 2022: Mildenhall Fen Tigers
- 2019, 2022: Scunthorpe Scorpions
- 2021: Kent Kings
- 2023: Oxford Chargers

Team honours
- 2023: NDL champions

Ryan Kinsley (born 25 September 1998) is an English motorcycle speedway rider.

== Career ==
Kinsley began his British career riding for the Kings Lynn junior team in 2015. In 2019, he re-signed for Mildenhall Fen Tigers as a replacement for broken leg victim Danny Ayres.

In 2021, Kinsley rode in the top tier of British Speedway, riding for the King's Lynn Stars in the SGB Premiership 2021. That same season, his career suffered a setback after his vand and bikes were stolen but luckily was able to retrieve them.

In 2022, Kinsley rode for the Scunthorpe Scorpions in the SGB Championship 2022 and Mildenhall Fen Tigers during the 2022 National Development League speedway season. In 2023, he joined the Oxford Chargers as a replacement for the injured Nathan Stoneman and he went on to win NDL league title with Oxford, defeating Leicester in a one-off Grand Final.
