= Danyon Hume =

English speedway rider

- Born: 25 July 1996 (age 30); Wendover, Buckinghamshire, England
- Nationality: British (English)

Career history
- 2016–2018, 2022-2023: Ipswich
- 2019, 2021, 2025: Sheffield
- 2019, 2025: Birmingham
- 2019: Leicester
- 2021: Poole
- 2022: Glasgow
- 2023: Redcar
- 2024–2025: Berwick

Team honours
- 2023: tier 1 KO Cup winner
- 2019: tier 3 league champions
- 2019: tier 3 KO Cup winner

Danyon Hume (born 25 July 1996) is a speedway rider from England.

== Career ==
Hume began his British speedway career riding for the Rye House Raiders during the 2015 National League speedway season. The following year in 2016, he signed for Ipswich Witches at the back end of the season

In 2017, Hume sustained a major arm injury at Poole which sidelined him for the remainder of that season. In 2019 as the club captain, he helped Leicester Lion Cubs win the division 3 league and cup double during the 2019 National Development League speedway season. In 2021, he rode for the Sheffield Tigers in the SGB Premiership, in addition to riding for the Poole Pirates in the SGB Championship.

In 2022, Hume rode for the Ipswich Witches in the SGB Premiership as the number 8 rider and joined Glasgow Tigers in the SGB Championship.

In 2023, Hume retained his place at the Ipswich Witches, where he helped the club win the Knockout Cup. He also signed for Redcar Bears in the SGB Championship.

Hume signed for Berwick Bandits for the 2024 and 2025 seasons. In 2025, he returned to Sheffield Tigers for the SGB Premiership 2025 but switched to Birmingham for the second time during the early part of the 2025 Premiership season.
