= Alfie Bowtell =

British speedway rider (born 1997)

- Born: 23 January 1997 (age 29); Chelmsford, Essex
- Nationality: British (English)

Career history
- 2015: Rye House
- 2016, 2023: Mildenhall
- 2017–2018: Lakeside
- 2017: Newcastle
- 2018: Isle of Wight
- 2018: Cradley
- 2019: Eastbourne
- 2020–2022, 2024–2025: Plymouth
- 2023: Birmingham
- 2026: Buxton

Team honours
- 2023: NDL Knockout Cup

Alfred Stuart H. Bowtell (born 23 January 1997) is a British speedway rider, who rides in the SGB Championship.

== Career ==
It was announced, on 6 March 2015, that Bowtell had signed for the Rye House Raiders for his debut season in the National League. By the end of the season, he had progressed out of the reserve and moved into the number 2 position, increasing his average from 3.00 to 3.95.

Bowtell moved to Mildenhall Fen Tigers for the 2016 National League season. He maintained his position at number 2 throughout the season and increased his average to 4.21 by the end of the season.

On 12 December 2017, Bowtell signed for Lakeside Hammers, after they dropped down to the National League from the top flight. He helped Lakeside finish 4th in the league. During the season Bowtell formed a middle order partnership with Paul Hurry; improving his average to 6.65. Bowtell also signed for Newcastle Diamonds in the SGB Championship; he came into the side at reserve to replace Dan Greenwood. He had improved his starting average of 2.00 to 2.19 by the end of the season.

In 2018, Bowtell replaced Max Clegg in the Lakeside team after they were forced to change their plans due to a mix up of averages. This was Bowtell's second consecutive season with Lakeside, and it allowed him to progress with them as they moved up to the SGB Championship for the 2018 season. Bowtell improved his average to 2.38 at the end of the season. In addition, Bowtell also signed for Cradley Heathens, who ran a team that only competed in the National Trophy. He was a replacement for the injured Jordan Jenkins. He helped the Heathens finish top of the North group taking them to the final against Mildenhall Fen Tigers.

On 11 June, Bowtell replaced Ben Hopwood in the Isle of Wight Warriors team. He started in the number 5 position before progressing to the number 1 position for the rest of the season. On 30 September, he competed in the National League Rider's Championship, losing the run off for the title, after finishing on 14 points with Isle of Wight team-mate Morley. He finished the season with an average of 9.28.

Bowtell joined Eastbourne Eagles for the SGB Championship in 2019. He completed the season with an official average of 3.1.

Plymouth Gladiators brought in Bowtell as their number 1 rider in advance of the 2020 National League season but the season was cancelled due to COVID-19. In 2021 and 2022, he rode for Plymouth in the SGB Championship 2021 and SGB Championship 2022, He also rode for Kent Royals during the 2022 National Development League speedway season, finishing third in the league averages.

In 2023, Bowtell signed for Birmingham Brummies for the SGB Championship 2023 and returned to Mildenhall for the 2023 NDL. In 2023, he helped Mildenhall win the Knockout Cup.

Bowtell re-joined the Plymouth Gladiators for the 2024 season.
