= Jake Allen (speedway rider) =

Australian speedway rider

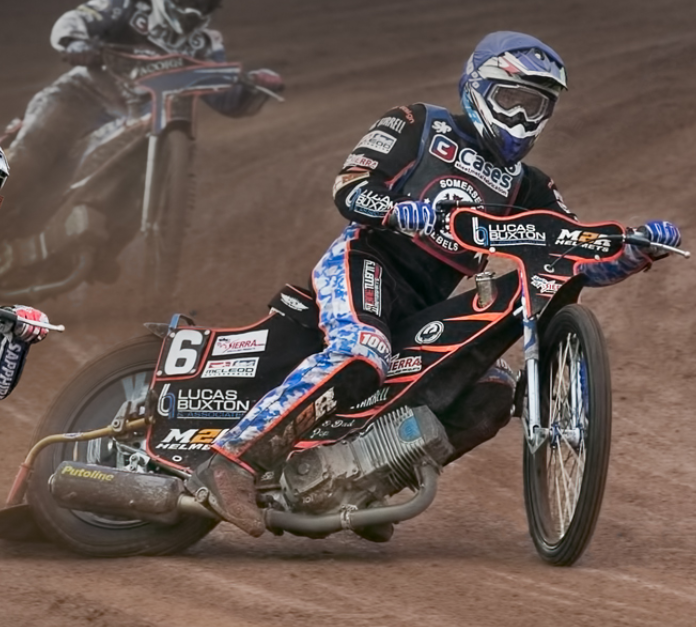
- Allen in 2016
- Born: 11 August 1995 (age 31); Brisbane, Australia
- Nationality: Australian

Career history
- 2016–2018: Somerset Rebels
- 2017–2019, 2022–2025: Scunthorpe Scorpions
- 2019–2021: Ipswich Witches
- 2021 2026: Redcar Bears
- 2022: Belle Vue Aces
- 2022: Sheffield Tigers
- 2023: Leicester Lions

Individual honours
- 2018: Queensland State Champion

Team honours
- 2023: Championship Knockout Cup

Jake Allen (born 11 August 1995) is an Australian speedway rider. He currently rides in the top tier of British Speedway in the SGB Premiership.

== Career ==
Allen began his British career riding for the Somerset Rebels in 2016, winning the Premier League and Premier League Cup. In 2021, Allen rodes for the Ipswich Witches in the SGB Premiership and the Redcar Bears in the SGB Championship.

In 2022, Allen signed for Scunthorpe Scorpions again in the SGB Championship 2022 and also had spells at Belle Vue and Sheffield in the Premiership. In 2023, he signed for Leicester Lions for the SGB Premiership 2023 and re-signed for Scunthorpe for the SGB Championship 2023, where he helped the team win the Knockout Cup.

Allen re-signed for Scunthorpe for the 2024 season.
