= Jye Etheridge =

Australian speedway rider

- Born: 30 April 1995 (age 31); Newcastle, Australia
- Nationality: Australian

Career history

Great Britain
- 2016: Edinburgh
- 2016: Redcar
- 2017–2024 2026: Berwick
- 2018–2022: Belle Vue
- 2025: Workington

Poland
- 2023: Rawicz

Denmark
- 2018, 2021: Esbjerg

Team honours
- 2022: British champions

Jye Darren Etheridge (born 30 April 1995) is an Australian Motorcycle speedway rider.

== Career ==
Etheridge has appeared in the top tier of British Speedway, riding for the Belle Vue Aces in the SGB Premiership. He is a three times rider of the year for Berwick Bandits. In 2021, Etheridge rode for the Belle Vue Aces in the SGB Premiership and the Berwick Bandits in the SGB Championship.

In 2022, Etheridge rode for the Belle Vue in the SGB Premiership 2022, where he won a league title. He also rode for Berwick in the SGB Championship 2022. In 2023 and 2024, he re-signed for Berwick for the SGB Championship seasons.

Etheridge signed for Workington Comets for the SGB Championship 2025.
