= Calculated match average =

Calculated match averages (CMAs, or averages) is a handicap calculated for every motorcycle speedway rider.

The CMA is calculated from the following:

$\left ( \frac{\hbox{Total points}}{\hbox{Total rides}} \right ) \times4$

CMAs scale from 3.00 to 12.00, any rider scoring above or below these values will be awarded the maximum. These averages are used in leagues such as the British Elite League to identify heat-leaders for the purposes of choosing which riders to enter for each race.

At the start of a season, a rider retains their last recorded CMA (or assessed CMA if they have never previously established one) until they have competed in six home and six away matches. A new CMA is then issued that comes into effect seven days later. These are subsequently updated each 1 and 15 day of each month onwards.

These CMAs are used in most professional leagues and are altered or weighted depending on the league the rider gained the CMA in. A rider that has no recorded average will receive an indicative CMA for the start of the season that is assessed on their prior experience in the sport.
