= SGB Championship Knockout Cup =

British speedway event

- Formerly: Premier League Knockout Cup
- Sport: Speedway
- Founded: 2017
- Divisions: (Div 1) Premiership KO Cup (Div 3) NDL KO Cup
- Country: United Kingdom
- Most recent champion: Poole Pirates

The SGB Championship Knockout Cup is a speedway second tier Knockout Cup competition in the United Kingdom. It was renamed in 2017 after previously being called the Premier League Knockout Cup.

== Past winners ==
Year	Winners	Runners-up	Ref
2017	Peterborough Panthers	Ipswich Witches	
2018	Workington Comets	Scunthorpe Scorpions	
2019	Redcar Bears	Newcastle Diamonds	
2020	Cancelled due to COVID-19 pandemic		
2021	Poole Pirates	Edinburgh Monarchs	
2022	Poole Pirates	Redcar Bears	
2023	Scunthorpe Scorpions	Poole Pirates	
2024	Poole Pirates	Oxford Cheetahs	

== See also ==
Knockout Cup (speedway) for full list of winners and competitions
