= Premiership Shield =

UK motorcycle speedway competition

SGB Premiership Shield
- Formerly: Elite Shield (2006-2017); Charity Shield (2018)
- Sport: motorcycle speedway
- Founded: 2006
- Folded: 2020
- Country: United Kingdom

The Premiership Shield formerly the Elite Shield (2006-2017) and Charity Shield (2018) was a motorcycle speedway competition held in the United Kingdom for the highest league at the time. Like football's Community Shield, it was contested for by the winners of the league and the winners of the Knockout Cup. The Shield began in 2006 and was contested as a season opener, although a postponed meeting in 2006, at Kirkmanshulme Lane (the home track of the Belle Vue Aces at the time) led to that meeting taking place later in the season.

The competition ended in 2020, after the season was cancelled due to the COVID-19 pandemic.

The Elite Shield was less prestigious than the other major domestic trophies such as the Knockout Cup.

== Past winners ==
Year	Winner	Runner-up	Scores
Elite Shield
2006	Coventry Bees	Belle Vue Aces	51–39, 41–51 Agg (92–90)
2007	Peterborough Panthers	Coventry Bees	53–38, 41–49 Agg (94–87)
2008	Swindon Robins	Coventry Bees	57–35, 41–52 Agg (98–87)
2009	Eastbourne Eagles	Poole Pirates	49–41, 49–43 Agg (98–84)
2010	Wolverhampton Wolves	Lakeside Hammers	62–34, 50–40 Agg (112–74)
2011	Wolverhampton Wolves	Poole Pirates	43–52, 55–38 Agg (98–90)
2012	Poole Pirates	Wolverhampton Wolves	46–44, 58–34 Agg (104–78)
2013	Swindon Robins	Poole Pirates	43–46, 55–37 Agg (98–83)
2014	Poole Pirates	Swindon Robins	56–34, 47–45 Agg (103–79)
2015	Poole Pirates	King's Lynn Stars	53–39, 43–46 Agg (96–85)
2016	Poole Pirates	Coventry Bees	56–34, 47–43 Agg (103–77)
2017	Poole Pirates	Wolverhampton Wolves	40–50, 58–32 Agg (98–82)
Charity Shield
2018	Swindon Robins	Belle Vue Aces	42–48, 52–38 Agg (94–86)
Premiership Shield
2019	Poole Pirates	King's Lynn Stars	50–40, 44–46 Agg (94–86)

== Season summaries ==
=== 2006 Elite Shield ===
Extended content

The inaugural Elite Shield was contested between the winners of the Elite League the Coventry Bees and the Knockout Cup winners the Belle Vue Aces. The two had already clashed in the Elite League playoff final the previous year. The first leg was scheduled to take place at Belle Vue's track, Kirkmanshulme Lane, on 13 March but rain forced the meeting to be delayed so the clash at Brandon Stadium became the first leg. During the first leg, Belle Vue rider Joe Screen was forced to retire from the meeting after just one race after a spectacular fall on the back straight in Heat 1. Despite this, the Aces kept themselves in touch for the first half of the meeting. Coventry went eight points ahead with a 5–1 race advantage in Heat 9, with Rory Schlein and Morten Risager finishing ahead of Jason Crump and Phil Morris. The meeting finished with a series of 4–2 race advantages. Belle Vue were never in a position to use the tactical ride.

Coventry Bees 51 Scott Nicholls 13, Rory Schlein 11, Martin Smolinski 8+2, Morten Risager 7+2, Billy Janniro 7+2, Chris Harris 4, Oliver Allen 1.

Belle Vue Aces 39 Kenneth Bjerre 13, Jason Crump 8+1, Simon Stead 7, Phil Morris 4+2, Tom P Madsen 4, James Wright 3, Joe Screen 0.

The return leg at Kirkmanshulme Lane eventually took place on 3 May at the second attempt. Despite Coventry losing the meeting 51–41, they took the title with a 92–90 aggregate victory. With gating much improved from recent visits to Belle Vue, the visitors kept in touch with the Aces for the initial nine races. Scott Nicholls regained some of his form to top score with 13 although it was not a vintage performance. Billy Janniro withdrew from the meeting with an arm injury after just two rides. Belle Vue required a 5–1 in the final heat to win but were thwarted as Bees skipper Nicholls took the win.

Belle Vue Aces 51 (90) Jason Crump 13+1, Simon Stead 12, Kenneth Bjerre 8+2, Joe Screen 7+1, Tommy Allen 5+1, Tom P Madsen 4+1, Phil Morris 2

Coventry Bees 41 (92) Scott Nicholls 13, Martin Smolinski 6+2, Rory Schlein 6, Chris Harris 5+1, Oliver Allen 4+1, Billy Janniro 4, Morten Risager 3+1

=== 2007 Elite Shield ===
Extended content

The 2007 Elite Shield was contested by the winners of the 2006 Elite League, the Peterborough Panthers, and the winners of the 2006 Elite League Knockout Cup, the Coventry Bees. The Bees appearing in their second Elite Shield. The first leg was hosted at the home of the Peterborough Panthers the East of England Showground on 15 March 2007. Just as in the previous season's first leg, rain threatened to abandon the encounter as there was some fairly unpleasant conditions shortly after the midway stage as steady drizzle intensified. Fortunately the band of rain then eased in the closing stages and that ensured the meeting would run its full course. A flawless display from Peterborough captain Hans Andersen in which he recorded four consecutive race wins as well as an excellent showing from Peterborough reserve rider Piotr Swiderski helped the home side to a comprehensive victory. Coventry produced just two winners all night with Scott Nicholls taking heat one to give the away side a surprising lead. Rory Schlein was the only other race winner in Coventry colours in taking victory in heat ten. Peterborough secured victory in heat thirteen when Kenneth Bjerre and Niels-Kristian Iversen recorded a 5–1 over the Bees pairing of Chris Harris and Nicholls. Bjerre also won heat fifteen from Nicholls to seal a 53–38 victory.

Peterborough Panthehr 53 Hans Andersen 12, Kenneth Bjerre 12, Piotr Swiderski 11+1, Niels-Kristian Iversen 9+1, Richard Hall 4+1, Daniel King 3, Lukas Dryml 2+1.

Coventry Bees 38 Scott Nicholls 12, Rory Schlein 9+1, Billy Janniro 5+2, Morten Risager 4+1, Olly Allen 4, Chris Harris 3, Martin Smolinski 1+1.

The return leg at the Brandon Stadium followed the next day on 16 March 2007. The standout moment of the night was when Coventry reserve rider Morten Risager stunned Grand Prix star Hans Andersen in heat 12 with a fabulous victory. The home side enjoyed near total domination in the opening stages with a number of superb heat wins, in fact Peterborough did not manage a heat winner until heat 8. This allowed Coventry to bridge the gap somewhat and after seven races the score on the night was 26–16 to the Coventry Bees and an aggregate score of 64–69. This was as close as the home side got to reaching their target as Peterborough recorded successive heat wins with two 4-2s and then a 5–1 in heat ten courtesy of Hans Andersen and Lukas Dryml. This brought the Panthers to within two points of the home team on the night. Niels-Kristian Iversen defeated Scott Nicholls in heat thirteen to win the shield for the Peterborough Panthers. Despite this setback Coventry recorded a 5–1 in heat fourteen, and Scott Nicholls victory in Heat fifteen gave the home side a 49–41 win on the night but could not prevent the Peterborough Panthers from winning on aggregate to lift the shield.

Coventry Bees 49 (87) Morten Risager 12, Scott Nicholls 12, Rory Schlein 9, Chris Harris 8+2, Olly Allen 4+1, Billy Janniro 4, Martin Smolinski 0.

Peterborough Panthers 41 (94) Niels-Kristian Iversen 12, Hans Andersen 10+1, Richard Hall 6+1, Kenneth Bjerre 5, Piotr Swiderski 4+1, Lukas Dryml 3+1, Daniel King 1.

=== 2008 Elite Shield ===
Extended content

The 2008 Shield was the first in which one team won both the Elite League and the Knockout Cup. The Coventry Bees winning both of these honours. In similar fashion to football's FA Community Shield in such an event the team who finishes second in the Elite League will contest the Elite Shield. This team was the Swindon Robins, who were also runners-up to the Coventry Bees in the Knockout Cup. The first leg was at the home of the Swindon Robins, the Abbey Stadium, on 23 March 2008. Swindon dominated the meeting providing twelve of the fifteen heat winners including 5-1s in heats 2,5,6,8,9,11 and 13. Swindon captain Leigh Adams managed a paid maximum in a flawless display. It was a team effort from the robins with the whole team scoring well with Travis McGowan and Mads Korneliussen both reaching double figures. The Coventry team on the other hand were almost an exact reverse with only Billy Janniro reaching double figures with an impressive 14 point haul. Besides Billy Janniro, only Chris Harris managed a race win taking heat 12 ahead of Troy Batchelor. Coventry tried the tactical substitute in heat 8 going from 15 metres back. Unfortunately for Coventry, the fifteen metre deficit was too much for Chris Harris to make up and Swindon recorded a 5–1. The regular tactical ride was used in heat 14 by Billy Janniro, although he failed to win his second place earned the Bees a 5–3. Leigh Adams gated phenomenally in heat 15 to head home Billy Janniro and Chris Harris to seal a massive 57–35 victory.

Ssindon Robins 57 Leigh Adams 13+2, Mads Korneliussen 10+1, Travis McGowan 10, Seb Alden 8+1, Troy Batchelor 7+1, James Wright 5+1, Theo Pijper 4+2.

Coventry Bees 35 Billy Janniro 14, Chris Harris 9+2, Simon Stead 5, Olly Allen 3, Rory Schlein 2+1, Stanisław Burza 1+1, Andreas Messing 1.

The return leg was at the home of the Coventry, the Brandon Stadium, the following evening. Swindon became the first team to lift the Elite Shield without winning the Knockout Cup or the Elite League and the Bees suffered a second consecutive Elite Shield defeat. Just as in the previous night's racing Leigh Adams was the key to Swindon's success, his victory in heat one got Swindon off to the perfect start with James Wright passing Oliver Allen after an engine failure. The Robins managed a second 4–2 in the following race to lead 8–4 thanks to a heat win from Sebastian Aldén the home side closed the gap on the night with consecutive heat advantages including a 5–1 in heat four with Stanisław Burza taking the win. Oliver Allen and Rory Schlein secured the Bees second 5–1 in heat 6 heading home Travis McGowan and Theo Pijper. A win from Rory Schlein in heat 10 kept Coventry's challenge alive, but Leigh Adams victory in heat 11 with the tactical ride provided a 7–2 for the Robins put them in touching distance of the Shield. Troy Batchelor's second place in heat 12 won the shield for Swindon Robins. Although the final heats were a formality, Simon Stead spoiled Leigh Adams maximum with a victory over him in heat 13. Billy Janniro won heat 15 from Troy Batchelor to seal his place as the Bees' highest points scorer, but he could not prevent scenes of celebration for the Robins and joy for their fans having suffered defeat to Coventry in all three cup finals last season.

Coventry Bees 52 (87) Billy Janniro 11+2, Simon Stead 9+1, Rory Schlein 9+1, Chris Harris 9, Olly Allen 7, Stanisław Burza 7, Andreas Messing 0.

Swindon Robibns 41 (98) Leigh Adams 14, Sebastian Alden 8, Mads Korneliussen 6, Troy Batchelor 7, James Wright 2, Theo Pijper 2, Travis McGowan 2.
