= 2012 Elite League speedway season =

British motorcycle speedway season

- League: 2012 Sky Sports Elite League
- Champions: Swindon Robins
- Knockout Cup: Poole Pirates
- Elite Shield: Poole Pirates
- Riders Championship: Chris Holder
- Highest average: Darcy Ward
- Division/s below: 2012 Premier League; 2012 National League

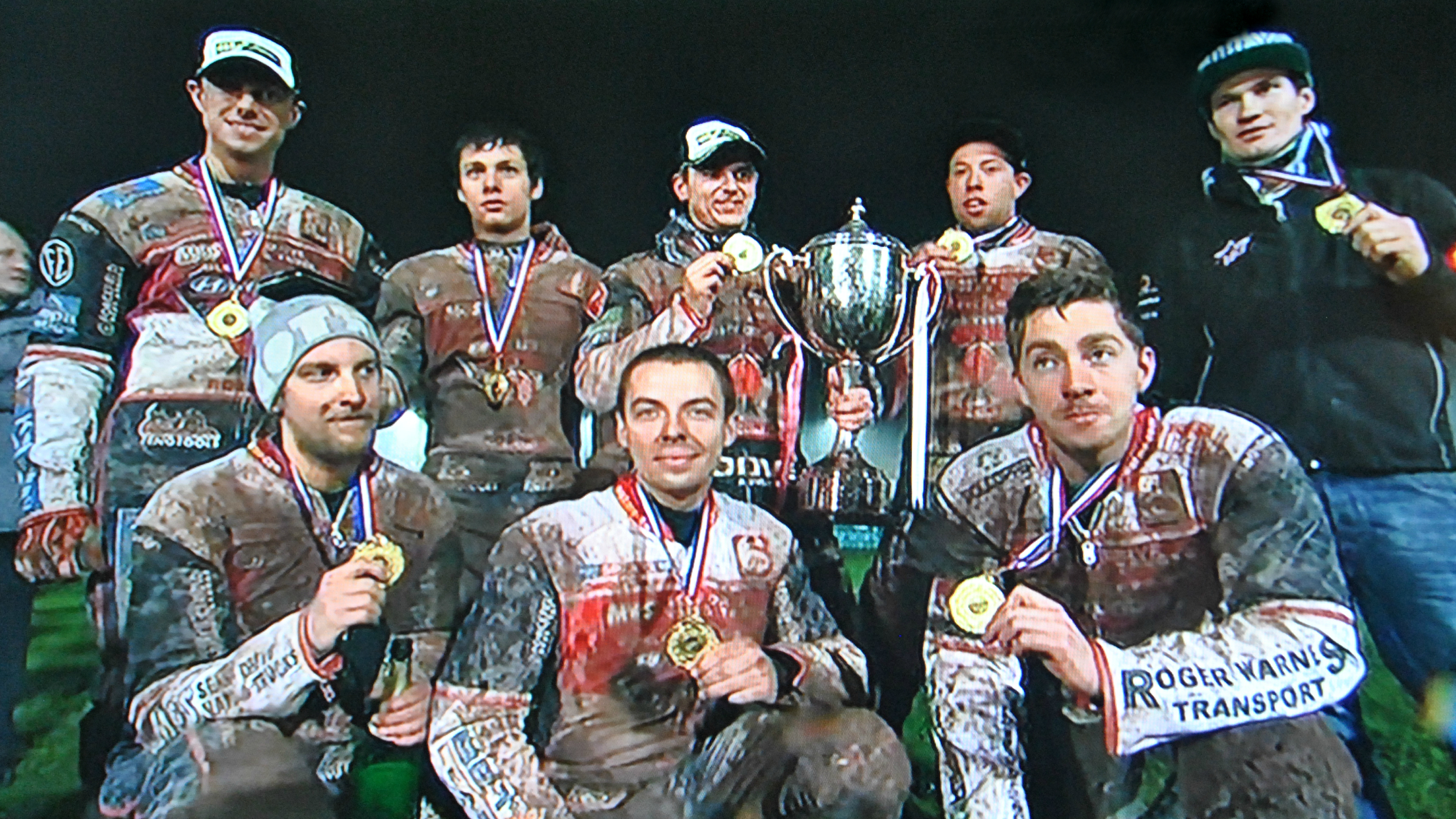
Champions - Swindon Robins (Left to right from rear: Stead, Morris, Andersen, Kildemand, Doyle, Aldén, Lampart, Batchelor

The 2012 Elite League speedway season (also known as the Sky Sports Elite League for sponsorship reasons) was the 78th season of the top division of UK speedway and took place between March and October 2012.

== Summary ==
The Poole Pirates were the defending champions after winning in 2011. Poole nearly repeated the success of the previous season but fell just short. They topped the regular season table for the third year running and won the Knockout Cup for the third year running but lost in the play off final to Swindon Robins. Darcy Ward and Chris Holder were exceptional for the Pirates again but Swindon's triumph (their first since 1967) was put down to a group of riders all maintaining consistent scores. They were Danes Hans Andersen and Peter Kildemand, Australians Troy Batchelor, Nick Morris and Jason Doyle (the latter recruited from Poole) and Sheffield born Simon Stead.

Lakeside Hammers and British speedway was rocked by the news that one of their leading riders Lee Richardson had been killed in a race at the Olympic Stadium in Wrocław, Poland on 13 May. The Hammers did well to finish in a play off place without their main heat leader. Richardson was the 1999 World Under-21 champion and a leading British international. Richardson died of injuries he suffered after touching the wheels of the rider just in front and being thrown into the fence. In recent years fatal accidents had become less frequent and this accident highlighted the dangers still involved in the sport. In part the accident was the catalyst for the decision to make air fences mandatory at tracks the following season.

== League table ==
Pos	Club	M	Home				Away					F	A	+/-	Pts
Pos	Club	M	3W	2W	D	L	4W	3W	D	1L	L	F	A	+/-	Pts
1	Poole Pirates	28	10	3	1	0	4	6	0	1	3	1355	1159		72
2	Swindon Robins	28	11	3	0	0	4	4	1	1	4	1382	1173		70
3	Birmingham Brummies	28	7	3	0	4	2	1	1	4	6	1276	1276		44
4	Lakeside Hammers	28	9	2	0	3	1	2	0	3	8	1279	1290		44
5	Eastbourne Eagles	28	9	3	0	2	1	1	0	2	10	1265	1277		42
6	Peterborough Panthers	28	9	3	1	1	0	1	0	5	8	1266	1287		42
7	Kings Lynn Stars	28	6	2	2	4	2	0	0	4	8	1278	1272		36
8	Coventry Bees	27	4	4	1	5	0	1	2	4	6	1217	1229		32
9	Wolverhampton Wolves	27	7	3	0	4	0	0	1	2	10	1178	1286		31
10	Belle Vue Aces	26	3	2	0	7	0	0	0	2	12	1072	1319		15

Key:
Championship play-offs

Home: 3W = Home win by 7 points or more; 2W = Home win by between 1 and 6 points
Away: 4W = Away win by 7 points or more; 3W = Away win by between 1 and 6 points; 1L = Away loss by 6 points or less
M = Meetings; D = Draws; L = Losses; F = Race points for; A = Race points against; +/- = Race points difference; Pts = Total Points

=== 'A' Fixtures ===
Home \ Away	BV	BIR	COV	EAS	KL	LH	PET	PP	SWI	WOL
Belle Vue Aces		33–57	n/a	45–47	42–50	42–51	57–31	40–52	33–60	54–40
Birmingham Brummies	50–43		46–44	56–34	51–41	55–35	47–43	36–54	37–53	50–42
Coventry Bees	59–31	40–50		38–52	47–43	60–31	48–42	44–49	42–48	52–40
Eastbourne Eagles	55–40	54–38	48–45		49–41	45–51	50–45	35–37	51–39	54–38
King's Lynn Stars	51–40	42–48	46–44	59–31		43–49	43–47	49–41	45–45	58–35
Lakeside Hammers	61–32	53–39	47–43	55–36	59–36		59–37	42–48	50–40	55–37
Peterborough Panthers	47–46	51–42	49–41	58–36	49–41	61–32		39–51	55–38	46–44
Poole Pirates	49–41	46–46	52–38	54–38	48–45	46–44	50–39		48–42	52–38
Swindon Robins	56–39	49–43	54–39	53–38	50–43	53–37	56–37	49–41		60–33
Wolverhampton Wolves	51–42	49–41	42–47	51–41	51–41	47–43	57–35	43–47	42–48	

Legend: Blue = home team win; Yellow = draw; Red = away team win.

=== 'B' Fixtures ===
Home \ Away	BV	BIR	COV	EAS	KL	LH	PET	PP	SWI	WOL
Belle Vue Aces		47–43	n/a	55–36	38–55	48–42	n/a	n/a	n/a	n/a
Birmingham Brummies	54–41		49–41	n/a	n/a	n/a	n/a	43–47	44–46	48–45
Coventry Bees	n/a	47–43		n/a	48–42	n/a	52–40	n/a	45–48	45–45
Eastbourne Eagles	61–29	n/a	n/a		53–37	51–39	47–43	n/a	n/a	61–32
King's Lynn Stars	58–32	n/a	45–45	51–39		n/a	46–44	n/a	41–52	n/a
Lakeside Hammers	57–38	n/a	n/a	47–43	n/a		52–40	41–48	36–53	n/a
Peterborough Panthers	n/a	n/a	45–45	54–38	50–43	57–36		49–44	n/a	n/a
Poole Pirates	n/a	55–38	n/a	n/a	n/a	57–37	56–33		49–41	52–38
Swindon Robins	n/a	48–42	51–39	n/a	45–43	55–39	n/a	50–43		n/a
Wolverhampton Wolves	46–44	53–40	51–39	47–42	n/a	n/a	n/a	41–49	n/a	

Legend: Blue = home team win; Yellow = draw; Red = away team win.

== Championship play-offs ==
=== Semi-finals ===
Leg 1

24 September 2012

Lakeside	43 – 47	Poole Pirates

Arena Essex Raceway
1 October 2012

Birmingham	35 – 55	Swindon

Perry Barr Stadium

Leg 2

1 October 2012

Poole	61 – 30	Lakeside

Wimborne Road
4 October 2012

Swindon	55 - 37	Birmingham

Abbey Stadium

=== Grand final ===
First leg

15 October 2012

Swindon Andersen 11 Kildemand 10 Alden 8 Stead 8 Morris 6 Batchelor 5 Lampart 3	51 - 44	Poole Ward 15 Holder 13 Kasprzak 10 Masters 3 Kling 2 Howarth 1

Abbey Stadium

Second leg

22 October 2012

Poole Kasprzak 16 Holder 12 Harris 8 Eklof 5 Kling 3 Lindgren 1	45 (89) - 44 (95)	Swindon Kildemand 11 Andersen 8 Stead 8 Batchelor 7 Alden 5 Morris 5 Lampart 0

Wimborne Road

The Swindon Robins were declared Elite League Champions, winning on aggregate 95-89.

== Elite League Knockout Cup ==
The 2012 Elite League Knockout Cup was the 74th edition of the Knockout Cup for tier one teams. Poole Pirates were the winners of the competition for the third consecutive year. The Knockout Cup was then suspended for four years until it was held again under the new name 2017 SGB Premiership Team KO Cup.

Quarter-finals

Date	Team one	Score	Team two
10/10	Belle Vue	35-42	Birmingham
not staged	Birmingham		Belle Vue
02/06	Lakeside	38-49	Coventry
01/06	Coventry	52-41	Lakeside
not staged	Swindon		Peterborough
not staged	Peterborough		Swindon
30/05	Poole	50-43	Wolverhampton
21/05	Wolverhampton	39-54	Poole

Semi-finals

Date	Team one	Score	Team two
25/10	Peterborough	50-43	Poole
24/10	Poole	51-39	Peterborough
18/10	Birmingham	45-45	Coventry
12/10	Coventry	51-45	Birmingham

Final

26 October

Coventry Bees; Nicholls 10; Szczepaniak 7 Summers 6 Kennett 5 Larsen 4 Hall 3 Harris 3	38–52	Poole Pirates; Iversen 15; Schlein 11; Kasprzak 9 Masters 9 Lindgren 7 Eklof 1	Brandon Stadium

29 October

Poole Pirates; Kasprzak 14; Iversen 13; Schlein 10; Howarth 7 Risager 4 Lindgren 2	50–40	Coventry Bees; Szczepaniak 13; Nicholls 11; Harris 6 Kennett 5 Summers 2 Larsen 2 Johnson 1	Wimborne Road

The Poole Pirates were declared Knockout Cup Champions, winning on aggregate 102-78.

== Riders' Championship ==
Chris Holder won the Riders' Championship. The final was held in Swindon on 20 October.

Pos.	Rider	Pts	Total	SF	Final
1	(Australia) Chris Holder	3 3 3 0 3	12	x	3
2	(Denmark) Niels Kristian Iversen	3 0 3 3 3	12	x	2
3	(England) Chris Harris	2 3 2 2 2	11	3	1
4	(Australia) Rory Schlein	2 2 1 3 2	10	2	f/exc
5	(Denmark) Michael Jepsen Jensen	3 3 2 3 0	11	1	
6	(England) Scott Nicholls	2 3 1 1 3	10	0	
7	(Denmark) Hans Andersen	3 1 3 0 1	8		
8	(Denmark) Mads Korneliussen	0 1 3 2 2	8		
9	(United States) Ryan Fisher	1 2 2 2 0	7		
10	(Denmark) Peter Kildemand	1 2 f/exc 1 2	6		
11	(Australia) Sam Masters	1 2 0 2 1	6		
12	(Sweden) Peter Karlsson	1 0 0 1 3	5		
13	(Finland) Joonas Kylmäkorpi	0 1 0 3 1	5		
14	(England) Lewis Bridger	2 0 1 1 0	4		
15	(Sweden) Freddie Lindgren	0 0 2 0 1	3		
16	(England) Danny King	ret 1 1 0 0	2		

- f=fell, exc=excluded, ret=retired

== Leading averages ==
Rider	Team	Average
(Australia) Darcy Ward	Poole	10.90
(Australia) Chris Holder	Poole	10.31
(Poland) Krzysztof Kasprzak	Poole	10.18
(Denmark) Niels Kristian Iversen	King's Lynn	9.51
(England) Tai Woffinden	Wolverhampton	9.09
(Sweden) Freddie Lindgren	Wolverhampton	9.08
(Denmark) Hans Andersen	Swindon	8.95
(Sweden) Peter Karlsson	Lakeside	8.76
(England) Lee Richardson	Lakeside	8.74
(England) Chris Harris	Coventry	8.59

== Riders & averages ==
Belle Vue

- (England) Craig Cook 7.59
- (Denmark) Charlie Gjedde 7.51
- (Australia) Rory Schlein 7.49
- (Czech Republic) Aleš Dryml Jr. 5.68
- (Russia) Renat Gafurov 5.47
- (Australia) Adam Shields 5.18
- (Denmark) Patrick Hougaard 5.09
- (England) Josh Grajczonek 4.88
- (Australia) Mark Lemon 4.87
- (Sweden) Linus Eklöf 2.97

Birmingham

- (Denmark) Bjarne Pedersen 7.84
- (England) Danny King 7.68
- (Poland) Sebastian Ulamek 7.29
- (England) Ben Barker 7.18
- (England) Josh Auty 6.63
- (Germany) Martin Smolinski 6.26
- (Italy) Nicolas Covatti 4.63
- (Poland) Tomasz Piszcz 2.06

Coventry

- (England) Chris Harris 8.59
- (England) Scott Nicholls 8.54
- (Denmark) Kenni Larsen 7.19
- (England) Edward Kennett 6.87
- (Australia) Aaron Summers 6.27
- (Poland) Michał Szczepaniak 6.03
- (England) Adam Roynon 5.42
- (Denmark) Henning Bager 4.61
- (Czech Republic) Josef Franc 4.60
- (England) Leigh Lanham 4.00

Eastbourne

- (Finland) Joonas Kylmakorpi 8.00
- (Finland) Timo Lahti 7.29
- (Sweden) Simon Gustafsson 7.09
- (Australia) Cameron Woodward 6.95
- (Czech Republic) Lukáš Dryml 6.59
- (England) Lewis Bridger 6.51
- (Russia) Denis Gizatullin 5.58

King's Lynn

- (Denmark) Niels Kristian Iversen 9.51
- (Denmark) Mads Korneliussen 7.24
- (Poland) Maciej Janowski 6.97
- (England) David Howe 6.79
- (Germany) Kevin Wölbert 6.23
- (Poland) Mateusz Szczepaniak 6.05
- (Sweden) Daniel Nermark 5.96
- (Denmark) Ulrich Østergaard 5.76
- (England) Joe Screen 5.68

Lakeside

- (Sweden) Peter Karlsson 8.76
- (England) Lee Richardson 8.74
- (Australia) Davey Watt 8.33
- (England) Richie Worrall 6.94
- (Sweden) Kim Nilsson 6.21
- (Finland) Kauko Nieminen 5.89
- (England) Stuart Robson 5.67
- (England) Robert Mear 5.12
- (Australia) Justin Sedgmen 5.12
- (Sweden) Jonas Davidsson 4.00

Peterborough

- (Sweden) Linus Sundström 8.55
- (Denmark) Kenneth Bjerre 8.29
- (Poland) Krzysztof Buczkowski 7.42
- (Denmark) Michael Jepsen Jensen 7.19
- (Poland) Norbert Kościuch 7.18
- (England) Oliver Allen 5.42
- (Denmark) Jesper B. Monberg 5.16
- (England) Richard Lawson 4.21

Poole

- (Australia) Darcy Ward 10.90
- (Australia) Chris Holder 10.31
- (Poland) Krzysztof Kasprzak 10.18
- (Poland) Adrian Miedziński 8.08
- (Sweden) Dennis Andersson 6.58
- (Australia) Sam Masters 4.34
- (Sweden) Ludvig Lindgren 4.29
- (Sweden) Ricky Kling 4.25
- (England) Kyle Howarth 3.87
- (Sweden) Linus Eklöf 3.62
- (Australia) Todd Kurtz 3.17

Swindon

- (Denmark) Hans N. Andersen 8.95
- (Australia) Troy Batchelor 8.41
- (Denmark) Peter Kildemand 7.97
- (Australia) Jason Doyle 7.89
- (Sweden) Sebastian Aldén 7.13
- (England) Simon Stead 6.79
- (Australia) Nick Morris 6.42
- (Poland) Dawid Lampart 5.83
- (Sweden) Robin Aspegren 5.52

Wolverhampton

- (England) Tai Woffinden 9.09
- (Sweden) Freddie Lindgren 9.08
- (United States) Ricky Wells 7.04
- (Australia) Ty Proctor 6.34
- (Poland) Robert Miśkowiak 6.28
- (Denmark) Nicolai Klindt 5.83
- (Sweden) Pontus Aspgren 3.66
- (Sweden) Jacob Thorssell 2.64
- (Poland) Lukasz Sowka 1.27

== See also ==
- List of United Kingdom Speedway League Champions
- Knockout Cup (speedway)
