= SGB Premiership 2017 =

British motorcycle speedway season

- League: SGB Premiership
- Champions: Swindon Robins
- Knockout Cup: Belle Vue Aces
- Elite Shield: Poole Pirates
- Individual: Fredrik Lindgren
- Pairs: King's Lynn Stars
- Highest average: Jason Doyle
- Division/s below: SGB Championship; National League

The 2017 SGB Premiership was the 83rd season of the top division of British Speedway. It was the first time that it was known as the SGB Premiership after changing its name from the Elite League.

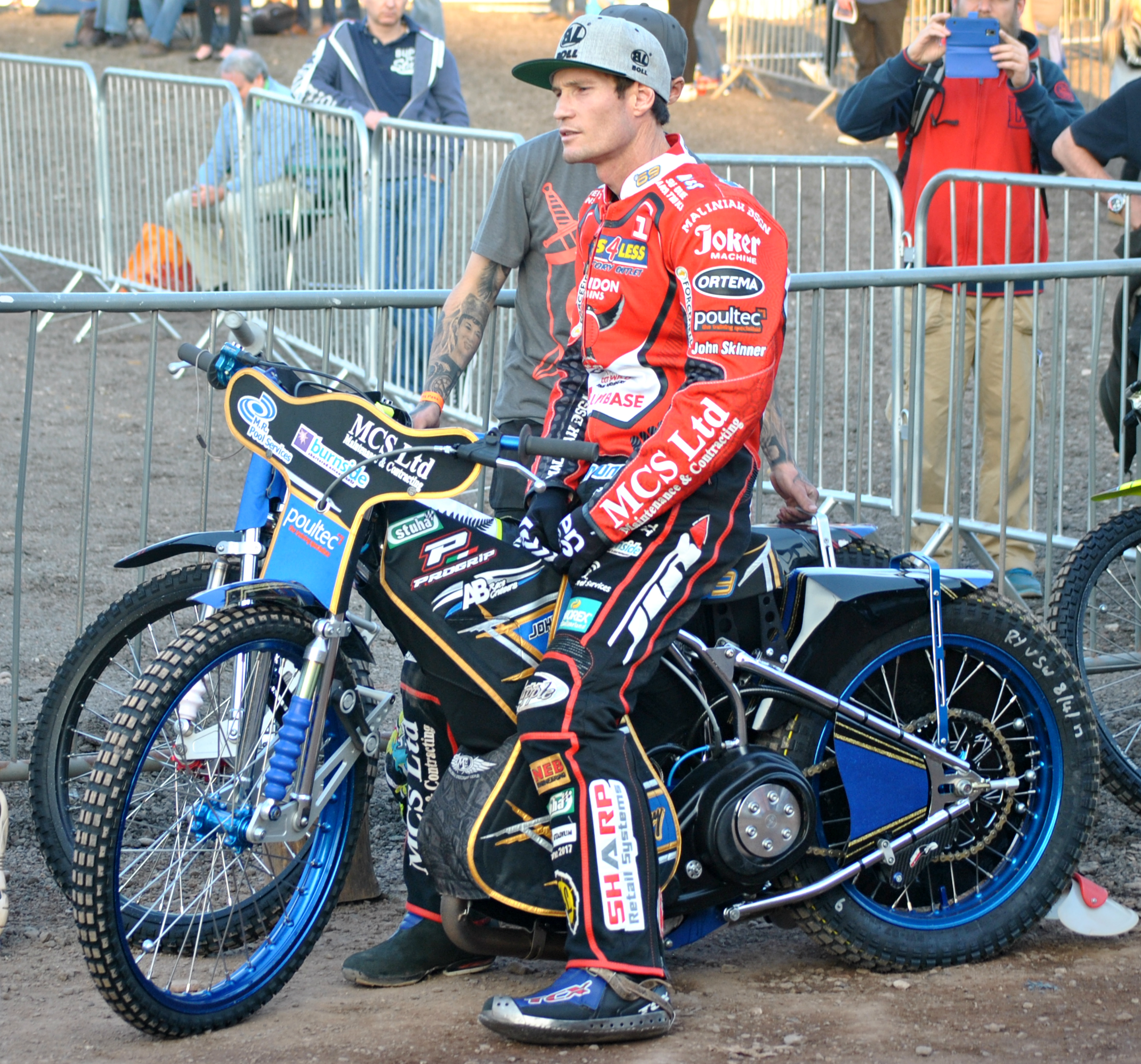
Jason Doyle topped the averages and won the league with Swindon

== Summary ==
The season ran between March and October 2017 and 8 teams participated (Coventry withdrew from the league before the season started, after they had originally entered the league). The lineup of teams for 2017 was different from the lineup of the 2016 Elite League. The Lakeside Hammers and Coventry Bees dropped out of the league and were replaced by the Rye House Rockets and the Somerset Rebels.

At the annual Speedway AGM, which was held early in November 2016, it was agreed that speedway in Great Britain would be given what was described as "the biggest revamp of the sport in modern history". This involved numerous alterations to both the regulations and the branding of the sport. The former top level of British speedway, the Elite League, was replaced by the Speedway Great Britain Premiership. Among the most notable changes to the regulations is the reintroduction of promotion and relegation between the top two leagues: the team that finishes in last place in the Premiership will race against the winners of the new second tier of British speedway (the SGB Championship) in order to decide who will compete in the Premiership in 2018.

The Swindon Robins were the champions defeating the Wolverhampton Wolves in the Grand Final. Swindon won in extraordinary circumstances, having lost the first leg against Wolves at home 47–43, they won the away leg 47–42, with Wolves promoter Peter Adams gracious in defeat, stating that speedway was the winner.

British TV broadcasting rights changed hands before the start of the 2017 SGB Premiership season, when Sky withdrew from their negotiated contract with the BSPA. BT then obtained the broadcasting rights for the 2017 season to be shown on their BT Sport channels.

Locations of the 2017 Premiership teams

== League ==
Teams face each other four times: twice home and twice away. The first of the home and away meetings are called the 'A' fixtures, and the second are the 'B' fixtures.

=== Regular season ===
Final League Table

Pos.	Club	M	Home			Away					F	A	Pts	+/−
Pos.	Club	M	W	D	L	4W	3W	D	1L	L	F	A	Pts	+/−
1	Swindon Robins	28	11	1	2	5	3	0	3	3	1339	1181	+158	66
2	Wolverhampton Wolves	28	13	0	1	4	1	0	5	4	1354	1151	+197	63
3	Belle Vue Aces	28	10	1	3	3	4	0	3	4	1310	1224	+86	58
4	Poole Pirates	28	8	0	6	3	2	3	2	4	1286	1268	+18	50
5	Rye House Rockets	28	12	0	2	1	2	0	1	9	1289	1237	+52	48
6	Somerset Rebels	28	7	1	6	0	3	0	1	10	1184	1338	-154	32
7	King's Lynn Stars	28	5	0	9	1	3	0	1	9	1138	1364	-226	29
8	Leicester Lions	28	6	1	7	0	1	1	3	9	1197	1334	-137	27

A Fixtures

Home \ Away	BV	KL	LEI	PP	RYE	SOM	SWI	WOL
Belle Vue		48–43	48–42	46–46	52–38	44–46	48–42	54–38
Kings Lynn	40–50		48–42	40–52	49–41	53–37	52–41	34–58
Leicester	41–49	54–38		34–56	44–46	48–42	48–42	36–57
Poole	43–47	44–49	52–40		50–33	54–36	45–47	46–44
Rye House	44–46	50–42	54–36	49–44		52–38	37–53	51–41
Somerset	50–40	44–46	61–30	47–43	54–38		44–46	44–49
Swindon	44–46	45–48	52–40	45–45	50–42	57–35		46–45
Wolverhampton	48–42	59–30	45–44	44–48	55–37	62–28	49–43	

Legend: Blue = home team win; Yellow = draw; Red = away team win.

B Fixtures

Home \ Away	BV	KL	LEI	PP	RYE	SOM	SWI	WOL
Belle Vue		54–39	42–48	59–31	58–33	49–41	35–49	53–40
Kings Lynn	45–48		50–40	43–50	44–46	43–47	40–50	21–41
Leicester	40–50	62–28		45–45	46–44	57–33	45–46	41–49
Poole	53–40	59–33	56–34		30–60	44–45	36–56	48–45
Rye House	48–44	65–26	55–38	56–35		60–30	46–29	48–42
Somerset	55–35	41–49	42–42	45–48	48–42		37–53	45–44
Swindon	48–42	48–41	50–41	56–34	57–33	54–35		52–40
Wolverhampton	49–41	48–24	54–39	50–43	50–41	56–34	52–38	

Legend: Blue = home team win; Yellow = draw; Red = away team win.

=== Play-offs ===
Draw

Semi Finals
1	Poole Pirates	44	38	82
4	Swindon Robins	46	51	97
3	Wolverhampton Wolves	51	39	90
2	Belle Vue Aces	38	51	89

Grand Final
Swindon Robins	43	47	90
Wolverhampton Wolves	47	42	89

Home team scores are in Dark Black

Semi-Finals

11 September

Poole Pirates	44–46	Swindon Robins	Poole Stadium; Referee(s): Mick Bates

25 September

Swindon Robins	51–38	Poole Pirates	Abbey Stadium; Referee(s): Graham Flint

25 September

Wolverhampton Wolves	51–38	Belle Vue Aces	Monmore Green; Referee(s): Willie Dishington

29 September

Belle Vue Aces	51–39	Wolverhampton Wolves	National Speedway Stadium; Referee(s): Phil Griffin

Grand Final

2 October

Swindon Robins; Jason Doyle 11; Nick Morris 9 David Bellego 7 Tobiasz Musielak 6 Bradley Wilson-Dean 4 Liam Carr 4 Adam Ellis 2	43–47	Wolverhampton Wolves; Sam Masters 12; Rory Schlein 11; Chris Harris 9 Kyle Howarth 7 Mark Riss 5 Nathan Greaves 3 Jacob Thorssell R/R	Abbey Stadium; Referee(s): Christina Turnbull

4 October

Wolverhampton Wolves; Sam Masters 12; Rory Schlein 10; Kyle Howarth 8 Nathan Greaves 7 Chris Harris 4 Mark Riss 1 Jacob Thorssell R/R	42–47	Swindon Robins; Jason Doyle 13; Nick Morris 11; Tobiasz Musielak 8 Adam Ellis 6 Bradley Wilson-Dean 5 David Bellego 4 Liam Carr 0	Monmore Green; Referee(s): Chris Durno

== Promotion and relegation play-off ==
9 October

Sheffield Tigers	32–58	Leicester Lions	Owlerton Stadium; Referee(s): Craig Ackroyd

16 October

Leicester Lions	49–41	Sheffield Tigers	Beaumont Park Stadium; Referee(s): Mick Bates

== Knockout Cup ==
The 2017 Knockout Cup was the 75th edition of the Knockout Cup for tier one teams. The competition returned after a four-year absence under a new name, it had previously been known as the Elite League Knockout Cup. Belle Vue Aces were the winners of the competition for a 14th time and extended their all-time record.

Draw

**Quarter Finals**
1	**Somerset Rebels**	**49**	42	**91**
8	Leicester Lions	41	**48**	89
5	King's Lynn Stars	**36**	42	**78**
4	**Wolverhampton Wolves**	54	**48**	**102**
3	Rye House Rockets	**41**	39	**80**
6	**Swindon Robins**	49	**51**	**100**
7	Poole Pirates	**46**	33	**79**
2	**Belle Vue Aces**	44	**57**	**111**

**Semi Finals**
**Wolverhampton Wolves**	**59**	37	**96**
Somerset Rebels	31	**53**	**84**
Swindon Robins	**50**	38	**88**
**Belle Vue Aces**	39	**52**	**91**

**Final**
Wolverhampton Wolves	**50**	38	**88**
**Belle Vue Aces**	40	**52**	**92**

Home team scores are in bold

=== Final ===
10 October

Wolverhampton Wolves; Nick Morris (10); Ricky Wells (13); Scott Nicholls (8); Rider Replacement; Sam Masters (7); Mark Riss (7); Nathan Greaves (5)	50–40	Belle Vue Aces; Kenneth Bjerre (11); Steve Worrall (6); Rider Replacement; Rohan Tungate (5); Craig Cook (10); Dan Bewley (6); Jack Smith (2)	Monmore Green; Referee(s): Ronnie Allan

16 October

Belle Vue Aces; Kenneth Bjerre (15); Steve Worrall (7); Rider Replacement; Rohan Tungate (14); Craig Harris (6); Dan Bewley (8); Jack Smith (2)	52–38	Wolverhampton Wolves; Scott Nicholls (4); Richard Lawson (10); Richie Worrall (5); Rider Replacement; Sam Masters (10); Mark Riss (6); Nathan Greaves (3)	National Speedway Stadium; Referee(s): Graham Flint

== Elite Shield ==
27 March

Wolverhampton Wolves	50–40	Poole Pirates	Monmore Green; Referee(s): Margaret Vardy

29 March

Poole Pirates	58–32	Wolverhampton Wolves	Poole Stadium; Referee(s): Ronnie Allan

== Riders' Championship ==
Freddie Lindgren won the Riders' Championship for the third time. The final was held at National Speedway Stadium on 16 September.

Pos.	Rider	Pts	Total	SF	Final
1	(Sweden) Freddie Lindgren	2,1,3,3,2	11	x	3
2	(Australia) Max Fricke	3,3,exc,1,2	9	2	2
3	(England) Craig Cook	3,2,2,3,3	13	x	1
4	(Sweden) Jacob Thorssell	3,0,3,0,2	8	3	0
5	(Denmark) Hans Andersen	3,3,2,2,0	10	1	
6	(Australia) Josh Grajczonek	1,2,3,2,1	9	0	
7	(England) Scott Nicholls	2,3,1,1,1	8		
8	(Australia) Nick Morris	1,2,2,0,3	8		
9	(England) Chris Harris	0,1,1,3,3	8		
10	(England) Josh Auty	ret,2,3,2,1	8		
11	(Australia) Brady Kurtz	2,3,0,2,ret	7		
12	(Australia) Jason Doyle	1,0,ret,3,3	7		
13	(England) Richard Lawson	1,0,2,1,1	5		
14	(Sweden) Kim Nilsson	ret,1,1,1,2	5		
15	(England) Danny King	0,1,1,0,0	2		
16	(Denmark) Thomas Jørgensen	2,0,0,0,exc	2		
17	(England) Rob Shuttleworth (res)	0	0		

- f=fell, exc=excluded, ret=retired ef=engine failure t-touched tapes

== Pairs Championship ==
A pairs championship was held for the top tier of speedway the first time since the Elite League Pairs Championship. last held in 2011. Despite its comeback for 2017 it was not held again afterwards.

Result

Group A
Pos	Club	Riders	Pts
1st	Wolverhampton	Fredrik Lingdren & Jacob Thorsell	17
2nd	Swindon	Jason Doyle & Nick Morris	14
3rd	Somerset	Patrick Hougaard & Rohan Tungate	12
4th	Belle Vue	Craig Cook & Max Fricke	11

Group B
Pos	Club	Riders	Pts
1st	King's Lynn	Chris Holder & Robert Lambert	21
2nd	Rye House	Scott Nicholls & Chris Harris	15
3rd	Leicester	Danny King & Kim Nilsson	11
4th	Poole	Brady Kurtz & Jack Holder	7

Semi Finals

Team One	Team Two	Score	Result
Wolverhampton	Rye House	7-2	Thorsell, Lindgren, Harris, Nicholls
King's Lynn	Swindon	5-4	Doyle, Lambert, Holder, Morris

Final

Team One	Team Two	Score	Result
King's Lynn	Wolverhampton	7-2	Lambert, Holder, Thorsell, Lindgren

== Final leading averages ==
Rider	Team	Average
(Australia) Jason Doyle	Swindon	10.26
(Sweden) Fredrik Lindgren	Wolverhampton	9.95
(Australia) Nick Morris	Swindon	9.42
(Sweden) Jacob Thorssell	Wolverhampton	9.33
(Denmark) Kenneth Bjerre	Belle Vue	8.98
(United Kingdom) Craig Cook	Belle Vue	8.68
(Poland) Krzysztof Kasprzak	Rye House	8.64
(Australia) Rory Schlein	Wolverhampton	8.61
(United Kingdom) Chris Harris	Rye House	8.47
(Australia) Brady Kurtz	Poole	8.47

== Riders and final averages ==
Belle Vue Aces

- (Denmark) Kenneth Bjerre (8.98)
- (United Kingdom) Craig Cook (8.68)
- (Australia) Max Fricke (8.10)
- (United Kingdom) Steve Worrall (7.63)
- (Australia) Rohan Tungate (7.31)
- (Australia) Justin Sedgmen (6.48)
- (United Kingdom) Dan Bewley (5.52)
- (United Kingdom) Jack Smith (2.24)

King's Lynn Stars

- (United Kingdom) Robert Lambert (8.00)
- (Australia) Chris Holder (8.00)
- (Australia) Troy Batchelor (7.87)
- (Denmark) Thomas Jørgensen (6.73)
- (Germany) Kai Huckenbeck (6.38)
- (United Kingdom) Lewis Rose (6.19)
- (Denmark) Michael Palm Toft (5.73)
- (Denmark) Nicklas Porsing (5.45)
- (United Kingdom) Josh Auty (5.33)
- (Sweden) Thomas H. Jonasson (4.91)
- (United Kingdom) Danny Ayres (4.29)
- (United Kingdom) Simon Lambert (2.74)
- (United Kingdom) Josh Bailey (1.33)

Leicester Lions

- (Sweden) Kim Nilsson (7.60)
- (United Kingdom) Danny King (7.19)
- (Germany) Erik Riss (6.53)
- (Denmark) Lasse Bjerre (6.52)
- (United Kingdom) Josh Bates (6.27)
- (Poland) Paweł Przedpełski (6.00) (1 match only)
- (United Kingdom) Kyle Newman (5.78)
- (United Kingdom) Jason Garrity (5.54)
- (Poland) Kacper Gomolski (5.00)
- (United Kingdom) Josh Auty (5.00) (2 matches only)
- (United Kingdom) Danny Ayres (4.40)

Poole Pirates

- (Australia) Brady Kurtz (8.47)
- (Denmark) Hans Andersen (8.42)
- (United Kingdom) Lewis Kerr (7.80)
- (United Kingdom) Richie Worrall (7.07)
- (Australia) Jack Holder (6.92)
- (Finland) Timo Lahti (6.85)
- (United Kingdom) Paul Starke (6.60)
- (Denmark) Nicolai Klindt (6.48)
- (United Kingdom) Edward Kennett (6.43)
- (Poland) Krzysztof Kasprzak (5.83)
- (Poland) Grzegorz Zengota (5.23) (3 matches only)
- (United Kingdom) Kyle Newman (4.71)
- (United Kingdom) James Shanes (3.96)

Rye House Rockets

- (Poland) Krzysztof Kasprzak (8.64)
- (United Kingdom) Chris Harris (8.47)
- (United Kingdom) Scott Nicholls (7.94)
- (United States) Ricky Wells (7.31)
- (United Kingdom) Edward Kennett (7.09)
- (United Kingdom) Ben Barker (6.93)
- (United Kingdom) Stuart Robson (6.83)
- (United Kingdom) Ellis Perks (5.23)
- (Australia) Robert Branford (3.92)
- (United Kingdom) Ben Morley (3.29)
- (Australia) Davey Watt (2.86) (2 matches only)

Somerset Rebels

- (Australia) Josh Grajczonek (7.53)
- (United Kingdom) Charles Wright (7.21)
- (United Kingdom) Richard Lawson (6.79)
- (Denmark) Patrick Hougaard (6.67)
- (Australia) Cameron Heeps (6.16)
- (United Kingdom) Lewis Kerr (5.93)
- (Australia) Jake Allen (5.61)
- (Australia) Rohan Tungate (5.33)
- (United Kingdom) Paul Starke (4.59)
- (Denmark) Jan Graversen (4.27)

Swindon Robins

- (Australia) Jason Doyle (10.26)
- (Australia) Nick Morris (9.42)
- (Poland) Tobiasz Musielak (8.32)
- (France) David Bellego (7.90)
- (United Kingdom) Adam Ellis (6.27)
- (New Zealand) Bradley Wilson-Dean (5.05)
- (United Kingdom) Zach Wajtknecht (5.86)
- (Austria) Dany Gappmaier (4.40) (2 matches only)
- (Denmark) Emil Grøndal (3.62)

Wolverhampton Wolves

- (Sweden) Fredrik Lindgren (9.95)
- (Sweden) Jacob Thorssell (9.33)
- (Australia) Rory Schlein (8.61)
- (Australia) Sam Masters (8.12)
- (United Kingdom) Kyle Howarth (7.78)
- (Germany) Mark Riss (6.00)
- (Poland) Adam Skornicki (3.75)
- (United Kingdom) Nathan Greaves (3.04)
- (United Kingdom) Max Clegg (2.25)
- (United Kingdom) Ellis Perks (1.45)

== See also ==
- The second division of British speedway SGB Championship 2017
- List of United Kingdom Speedway League Champions
- Knockout Cup (speedway)
