= Elite League Knockout Cup =

- Formerly: Premier League Knockout Cup
- Sport: Speedway
- Founded: 1997
- Folded: 2012
- Replaced by: SGB Premiership Knockout Cup
- Country: United Kingdom
- Last champion: Poole Pirates
- Website: BSPA Website

The Elite League Knockout Cup was a speedway Knockout Cup competition in the United Kingdom from 1997 to 2012.

== History ==
It was governed by the Speedway Control Bureau (SCB) in conjunction with the British Speedway Promoters' Association (BSPA). The teams from the top division of league racing, the Elite League, took part. Similar competitions were held for clubs in leagues that preceded the Elite League, including the British League Knockout Cup and the Premier League Knockout Cup.

== Rules ==
This competition was run on the knockout principle; teams drawn together race home and away matches, with the aggregate score deciding the result. In the event of the aggregate score being level, the teams again race home and away.

== Winners ==
| Year | Winners | Runners-up |
Elite League Knockout Cup
| 1997 | Eastbourne Eagles | Poole Pirates |
| 1998 | Ipswich Witches | Coventry Bees |
| 1999 | Peterborough Panthers | Poole Pirates |
| 2000 | King's Lynn Stars | Coventry Bees |
| 2001 | Peterborough Panthers | Ipswich Witches |
| 2002 | Eastbourne Eagles | Peterborough Panthers |
| 2003 | Poole Pirates | Coventry Bees |
| 2004 | Poole Pirates | Ipswich Witches |
| 2005 | Belle Vue Aces | Eastbourne Eagles |
| 2006 | Coventry Bees | Belle Vue Aces |
| 2007 | Coventry Bees | Swindon Robins |
| 2008 | Eastbourne Eagles | Poole Pirates |
| 2009 | Lakeside Hammers | Coventry Bees |
| 2010 | Poole Pirates | Eastbourne Eagles |
| 2011 | Poole Pirates | Belle Vue Aces |
| 2012 | Poole Pirates | Coventry Bees |

== See also ==
Knockout Cup (speedway) for full list of winners and competitions
