= 2004 Elite League speedway season =

British motorcycle speedway season

- League: Sky Sports Elite League
- Champions: Poole Pirates
- Knockout Cup: Poole Pirates
- Individual: Bjarne Pedersen
- Pairs: Swindon Robins
- Highest average: Tony Rickardsson
- Division/s below: Premier League; Conference League

The 2004 Elite League speedway season was the 70th season of the top division of speedway in the United Kingdom and governed by the Speedway Control Bureau (SCB), in conjunction with the British Speedway Promoters' Association (BSPA). Poole Pirates completed the double (league and cup winners) for the second year running. They were the first team to achieve this since Oxford Cheetahs in 1986.

== Season summary ==
In 2004, the league increased to ten teams, with the Arena Essex Hammers and the Swindon Robins moving up from the Premier League. The title was decided by a play-off between the top five teams. The team that finished top of the table were seeded directly to the final and the next four met in quarter and semi final rounds. The winner of these rounds qualified for the final.

Poole Pirates dominated the season again and completed the 'double double' meaning winning the league and cup for two consecutive seasons. This had not been achieved since Oxford Cheetahs during the 1985 and 1986 seasons. Poole retained the majority of their 2003 squad, five time World Champion Tony Rickardsson, Magnus Zetterström, Antonio Lindbäck and Bjarne Pedersen but Ryan Sullivan was brought in from Peterborough to replace Leigh Adams who moved to Swindon.

Rickardsson topped the league averages but only raced part of the season returning to Sweden to spend more time with his family.

== Final table ==
Pos		M	W	D	L	F	A	Pts	Bon	Tot
1	Poole Pirates	36	23	2	11	1721	1603	48	13	61
2	Wolverhampton Wolves	36	21	0	15	1729	1586	42	16	58
3	Ipswich Witches	36	21	0	15	1701	1626	42	11	53
4	Eastbourne Eagles	36	18	3	15	1699	1632	39	11	50
5	Oxford Silver Machine	36	19	0	17	1679	1672	38	10	48
6	Swindon Robins	36	18	3	15	1657	1667	39	6	45
7	Belle Vue Aces	35	17	0	18	1630	1597	34	9	43
8	Arena Essex Hammers	36	16	0	20	1651	1679	32	8	40
9	Peterborough Panthers	35	12	2	21	1514	1722	23	3	26
10	Coventry Bees	36	9	0	27	1565	1762	18	3	21

_{* Belle Vue v Peterborough not held}

= Qualified for Play Off final
= Qualified for Play Offs

=== 'A' Fixtures ===
Home \ Away	AE	BV	COV	EAS	IPS	OX	PET	PP	SWI	WOL
Arena Essex Hammers		51–42	62–34	47–46	48–42	53–41	47–46	43–47	45–48	51–44
Belle Vue Aces	49–41		48–45	48–45	41–49	44–46	63–32	68–25	60–30	47–46
Coventry Bees	44–51	44–46		45–50	45–49	42–48	61–31	40–55	52–38	44–45
Eastbourne Eagles	53–40	57–38	55–39		50–40	47–43	50–40	51–44	60–32	45–46
Ipswich Witches	57–38	52–41	54–41	47–46		44–46	54–40	50–43	56–40	51–39
Oxford Silver Machine	52–43	52–43	71–21	53–43	44–45		54–38	65–29	53–41	40–54
Peterborough Panthers	47–46	42–48	51–42	50–46	53–44	47–43		46–46	47–46	54–41
Poole Pirates	47–43	49–42	47–45	52–44	58–34	58–37	48–45		56–38	53–43
Swindon Robins	47–42	46–47	47–46	48–42	56–37	52–44	63–31	53–39		49–47
Wolverhampton Wolves	62–30	51–42	49–41	44–45	49–44	58–35	53–39	50–40	52–44	

Legend: Blue = home team win; Yellow = draw; Red = away team win.

=== 'B' Fixtures ===
Home \ Away	AE	BV	COV	EAS	IPS	OX	PET	PP	SWI	WOL
Arena Essex Hammers		57–40	53–41	47–43	42–48	57–38	59–36	53–40	49–43	48–42
Belle Vue Aces	57–40		50–45	44–45	50–41	57–38	n/a	47–43	48–42	50–42
Coventry Bees	52–41	45–44		49–41	45–44	58–36	53–42	46–44	43–47	41–52
Eastbourne Eagles	50–43	51–39	62–29		52–45	47–46	47–43	40–50	45–45	43–49
Ipswich Witches	49–41	55–39	54–41	63–31		55–38	52–42	50–43	49–46	41–51
Oxford Silver Machine	53–42	48–45	53–41	51–43	450–45		49–41	46–47	49–44	52–43
Peterborough Panthers	48–45	49–41	47–43	48–48	55–40	44–46		42–51	30–46	48–45
Poole Pirates	52–40	54–40	55–39	46–49	48–33	54–37	53–40		57–38	54–40
Swindon Robins	51–43	47–42	50–44	45–45	52–40	54–42	52–44	45–45		48–45
Wolverhampton Wolves	43–33	55–36	50–39	54–42	42–48	53–40	57–36	41–49	51–44	

Legend: Blue = home team win; Yellow = draw; Red = away team win.

== Play-offs ==
Quarter-final and Semi-final decided over one leg. Grand Final decided by aggregate scores over two legs.

Quarter-finals

- Wolverhampton Wolves 61-33 Oxford Silver Machine
- Ipswich Witches 55-39 Eastbourne Eagles

Semi-finals

- Wolverhampton Wolves 45-45 Ipswich Witches (Mikael Max beat Hans Andersen in run-off)

=== Final ===
First leg

4 October 2004

Wolverhampton Wolves Mikael Max 13 Freddie Lindgren 9 David Howe 7 Sam Ermolenko 6 Adam Skórnicki 5 Chris Neath 1 Daniel Nermark R/R	41 - 49	Poole Pirates Antonio Lindbäck 12 Leigh Adams (guest) 11 Bjarne Pedersen 9 Matej Ferjan 6 Magnus Zetterström 6 Krzysztof Kasprzak 4 Daniel Davidsson 1

Monmore Green Stadium

Second leg

11 October 2004

Poole Pirates Bjarne Pedersen 12 Antonio Lindbäck 11 Ryan Sullivan 11 Matej Ferjan 8 Daniel Davidsson 8 Magnus Zetterström 7 Krzysztof Kasprzak 6	63 - 30	Wolverhampton Wolves Freddie Lindgren 12 Mikael Max 7 Sam Ermolenko 7 Adam Skórnicki 2 David Howe 2 Magnus Karlsson 0 Daniel Nermark R/R

Poole Stadium

The Poole Pirates were declared League Champions, winning on aggregate 112-71.

== Elite League Knockout Cup ==
The 2004 Elite League Knockout Cup was the 66th edition of the Knockout Cup for tier one teams. Poole Pirates were the winners of the competition. Poole had started the final second leg under protest because of the Ipswich team changes that included a late replacement rider Davey Watt, who Poole considered was ineligible.

First round

Date	Team one	Score	Team two
01/04	Coventry	42-54	Belle Vue
06/05	Swindon	56-38	Wolverhampton
22/03	Wolverhampton	50-43	Swindon

Quarter-finals

Date	Team one	Score	Team two
23/09	Swindon	48-42	Belle Vue
11/09	Eastbourne	46-48	Ipswich
12/05	King's Lynn	56-39	Isle of Wight
06/05	Swindon	56-38	Wolverhampton
07/04	Arena Essex	48-46	Oxford
02/04	Peterborough	44-46	Poole
01/04	Coventry	42-54	Belle Vue
26/03	Oxford	47-46	Arena Essex
25/03	Ipswich	51-42	Eastbourne
24/03	Poole	58-37	Peterborough

Semi-finals

Date	Team one	Score	Team two
06/10	Arena Essex	43-46	Ipswich
06/10	Poole	61-30	Swindon
07/10	Ipswich	51-42	Arena Essex
07/10	Swindon	53-40	Poole

=== Final ===
First leg

21 October 2004

Ipswich Witches Hans Andersen 11 Scott Nicholls 9 Chris Louis 8 Jesper B. Jensen 7 Danny Bird 6 Kim Jansson 4 Danny King 3	48 - 42	Poole Pirates Antonio Lindbäck 8 Ryan Sullivan 8 Matej Ferjan 8 Krzysztof Kasprzak 8 Bjarne Pedersen 5 Magnus Zetterström 4 Daniel Davidsson 1

Foxhall Stadium

Second leg

31 October 2004

Poole Pirates Antonio Lindbäck 13 Ryan Sullivan 11 Matej Ferjan 10 Krzysztof Kasprzak 7 Magnus Zetterström 7 Bjarne Pedersen 6 Daniel Davidsson 3	57 - 39	Ipswich Witches Hans Andersen 14 Scott Nicholls 11 Kim Jansson 7 Chris Louis 6 Jesper B. Jensen 1 Davey Watt 0 Danny King 0

Wimborne Road

The Poole Pirates were declared Knockout Cup Champions, winning on aggregate 99-87.

== Riders' Championship ==
Bjarne Pedersen won the Riders' Championship. The final was held at Wimborne Road on 17 October.

Pos.	Rider	Pts	Total	SF	Final
1	(Denmark) Bjarne Pedersen	3 2 2 2 2	11	2	3
2	(Australia) Ryan Sullivan	3 3 3 3 2	14	x	2
3	(Denmark) Hans Andersen	1 3 2 3 3	12	3	1
4	(Australia) Rory Schlein	3 3 2 1 3	12	x	0
5	(Slovenia) Matej Ferjan	2 3 3 3 0	11	1	
6	(Sweden) Mikael Max	2 2 2 3 3	12	0	
7	(Australia) Leigh Adams	2 2 3 1 1	9		
8	(England) Scott Nicholls	3 1 1 0 3	8		
9	(Australia) Adam Shields	2 1 1 2 1	7		
10	(England) David Howe	0 0 3 1 2	6		
11	(Australia) Davey Watt	1 1 1 2 0	5		
12	(England) Gary Havelock	0 2 0 0 2	4		
13	(Poland) Rafał Dobrucki	1 0 0 2 0	3		
14	(England) Chris Harris	1 1 0 0 1	3		
15	(United States) Josh Larsen	0 0 1 1 1	3		
16	(France) Sebastien Trésarrieu	0 0 0 0 0	0		

== Pairs ==
The Elite League Pairs Championship, sponsored by Suzuki, was held in Swindon on 11 April and was won by Swindon Robins.

Group A

Pos	Team	Pts	Riders
1	Swindon		Adams & Gjedde
2	Belle Vue		Crump & Screen
3	Oxford	15	Ulamek 11, McGowan 4
4	Coventry		Jonsson & Janniro
5	Poole		Rickardsson & Lyons

Group B

Pos	Team	Pts	Riders
1	Peterborough		Richardson & Dryml
2	Eastbourne		Pedersen & Shields
?	Wolves		Max & Howe
?	Ipswich		Nicholls & Andersen
?	Arena Essex		Loram & Barker

Semi finals

- Swindon beat Eastbourne
- Belle Vue beat Peterborough 7–2

Final

- Swindon beat Belle Vue 5–4

== Leading final averages ==
Rider	Team	Average
(Sweden) Tony Rickardsson	Poole	10.89
(Australia) Leigh Adams	Swindon	10.83
(Australia) Jason Crump	Belle Vue	10.67
(England) David Norris	Eastbourne	9.95
(England) Mark Loram	Arena Essex	9.87
(United States) Greg Hancock	Oxford	9.83
(Denmark) Nicki Pedersen	Eastbourne	9.48
(Sweden) Mikael Max	Wolverhampton	9.39
(England) Scott Nicholls	Ipswich	9.33
(Sweden) Andreas Jonsson	Coventry	9.07

== Rider & final averages ==
Arena Essex

- (England) Mark Loram 9.87
- (England) Dean Barker 6.67
- (Poland) Roman Povazhny 6.57
- (England) Kelvin Tatum 6.18
- (United States) Josh Larsen 6.06
- (England) Paul Hurry 6.02
- (England) Leigh Lanham 5.82
- (Poland) Grzegorz Walasek 5.66
- (Denmark) Ronni Pedersen 4.44

Belle Vue

- (Australia) Jason Crump 10.67
- (England) Joe Screen 7.40
- (England) Andre Compton 7.27
- (Finland) Kai Laukkanen 7.25
- (Denmark) Kenneth Bjerre 7.13
- (Australia) Rory Schlein 7.10
- (Poland) Tomasz Jędrzejak 6.13
- (United States) Ronnie Correy 6.03
- (United States) Brent Werner 4.91
- (England) Scott Robson 4.73
- (Czech Republic) Antonín Šváb Jr. 4.51
- (England) Neil Collins 3.68
- (England) Jon Armstrong 2.12
- (Czech Republic) Jan Jaroš 1.57
- (Sweden) Tobias Johansson 0.47

Coventry

- (Sweden) Andreas Jonsson 9.07
- (United States) Billy Janniro 7.11
- (Russia) Sergei Darkin 6.68
- (England) Stuart Robson 6.49
- (Denmark) John Jørgensen 6.00
- (Denmark) Morten Risager 5.85
- (England) Chris Harris 5.67
- (New Zealand) Jason Bunyan 4.76
- (Poland) Tomasz Piszcz 2.29
- (United States) Bryan Yarrow 1.05

Eastbourne

- (England) David Norris 9.95
- (Denmark) Nicki Pedersen 9.48
- (Australia) Adam Shields 8.18
- (Finland) Joonas Kylmäkorpi 7.02
- (Sweden) Peter Ljung 5.00
- (England) Andrew Moore 4.52
- (England) Edward Kennett 4.20
- (Denmark) Ulrich Østergaard 2.92
- (Poland) Adrian Miedziński 2.42
- (Denmark) Steen Jensen 2.07

Ipswich

- (England) Scott Nicholls 9.33
- (Denmark) Hans N. Andersen 8.59
- (England) Chris Louis 8.29
- (Denmark) Jesper B. Jensen 7.30
- (England) Danny Bird 6.49
- (Sweden) Kim Jansson 5.96
- (England) Danny King 3.30
- (Australia) Trevor Harding 1.41

Oxford

- (United States) Greg Hancock 9.83
- (Poland) Sebastian Ułamek 6.74
- (Australia) Travis McGowan 6.60
- (United States) Ryan Fisher 6.25
- (Denmark) Niels Kristian Iversen 6.25
- (Poland) Rafał Dobrucki 5.96
- (Sweden) Jonas Davidsson 5.20
- (Denmark) Tom P. Madsen 4.91

Peterborough

- (England) Lee Richardson 8.62
- (England) Gary Havelock 7.86
- (Czech Republic) Lukáš Dryml 6.86
- (Czech Republic) Aleš Dryml Jr. 6.55
- (Denmark) Henning Bager 5.40
- (England) Ricky Ashworth 4.55
- (Poland) Tomasz Piszcz 4.00
- (Hungary) Norbert Magosi 2.21
- (Poland) Dariusz Śledź 2.00

Poole

- (Sweden) Tony Rickardsson 10.89
- (Sweden) Antonio Lindbäck 8.77
- (Australia) Ryan Sullivan 8.66
- (Denmark) Bjarne Pedersen 8.63
- (Slovenia) Matej Ferjan 7.65
- (Poland) Krzysztof Kasprzak 6.29
- (Sweden) Magnus Zetterström 5.86
- (Australia) Jason Lyons 5.43
- (Australia) Davey Watt 4.80
- (Sweden) Daniel Davidsson 4.72

Swindon

- (Australia) Leigh Adams 10.83
- (Denmark) Charlie Gjedde 7.23
- (Australia) Steve Johnston 6.98
- (Sweden) Peter Ljung 6.41
- (Sweden) David Ruud 6.05
- (England) Andy Smith 5.79
- (England) Oliver Allen 3.89
- (England) Glenn Cunningham 2.74

Wolverhampton

- (Sweden) Mikael Max 9.39
- (United States) Sam Ermolenko 7.48
- (England) David Howe 7.37
- (Sweden) Daniel Nermark 6.86
- (Poland) Adam Skórnicki 6.52
- (Sweden) Freddie Lindgren 6.43
- (England) Chris Neath 5.59
- (United States) Eric Carrillo 2.12

== See also ==
- Speedway in the United Kingdom
- List of United Kingdom Speedway League Champions
- Knockout Cup (speedway)
