= Ellis Perks =

British speedway rider (born 1997)

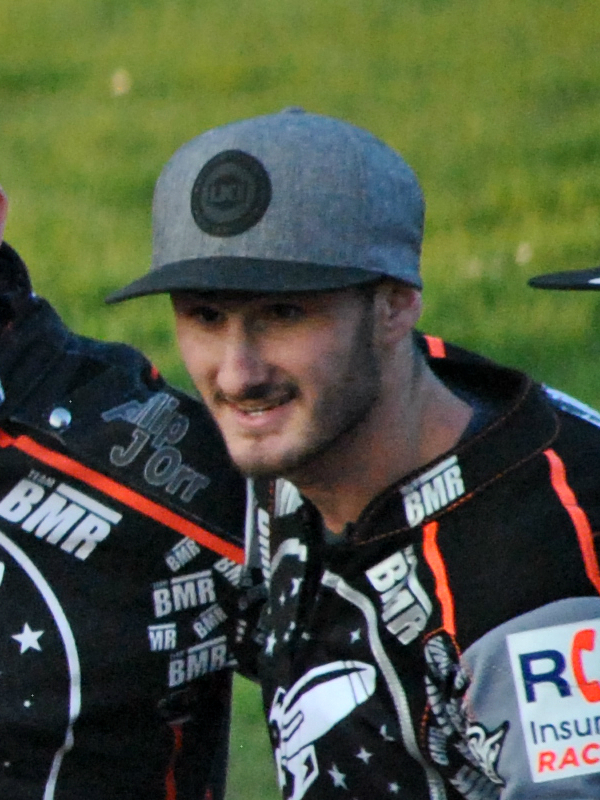
- Born: 18 March 1997 (age 29); Worcester, England
- Nationality: British (English)

Career history
- 2014: Scunthorpe Saints
- 2015: Scunthorpe Scorpions
- 2015: Cradley Heathens
- 2016, 2018: Plymouth Devils
- 2016: Eastbourne Eagles
- 2017: Rye House Rockets
- 2017: Redcar Bears
- 2017: Wolverhampton Wolves
- 2018: Peterborough Panthers
- 2019–2020: Leicester Lions
- 2019: Leicester Lion Cubs
- 2019–2020: Swindon Robins

Team honours
- 2016: National League Knock-Out Cup
- 2018: SGB Championship Four Team Championship
- 2019: SGB Premiership
- 2019: SGB Premiership Supporters Cup
- 2019: SGB Championship
- 2019: Championship Shield
- 2019: National League
- 2019: National League Knockout Cup

Ellis George Perks (born 18 March 1997) is an English former motorcycle speedway rider. In 2019, he became the first rider to win all three tiers of the British Speedway leagues in the same season; the Premiership, Championship and National League.

== Family ==
Perks is the great nephew of rider Dave Perks and son of former referee Robbie Perks.

== Career ==
Born in Worcester, England, Perks began riding grasstrack at the age of six and took up speedway at the age of ten after moving to Australia with his family in 2007.

Perks made his British speedway league debut in 2014 with Scunthorpe Scorpions' National League team, and was signed by Poole Pirates as a club asset in 2015, riding that year in the Premier League for Scorpions and in the National League for Cradley Heathens and Eastbourne Eagles, and in 2016 for Plymouth Devils and Isle of Wight Warriors.

At the beginning of the 2017 season, Perks signed for the Rye House Rockets. He also rode that season for Wolverhampton Wolves, Redcar Bears, and Buxton Hitmen. After failing to get a team place at the start of the 2018 season, he was signed by Peterborough Panthers in June as a short-term replacement for Emil Grondal, and in July returned to the Heathens team for their National Trophy campaign.

In December 2018, Perks signed to ride for Leicester Lions in the SGB Championship and Leicester Lion Cubs in the National League for the 2019 season. He also signed for Swindon Robins in the SGB Premiership. He went on to win all three leagues with these teams in 2019, the first ever rider to achieve this. He also won the SGB Premiership Supporters Cup with the Robins, the Championship Shield with the Lions and National League Knockout Cup with the Lion Cubs in the same year.
