= Swindon Robins =

English motorcycle speedway team

Club information
- Track address: Abbey Stadium, Blunsdon, Swindon
- Country: England
- Founded: 1949
- Closed: 2022
- League: SGB Premiership
- Website: www.swindon-speedway.com

Club facts
- Colours: Red, white and black
- Track size: 315 metres (344 yd)
- Track record time: 58.86 seconds
- Track record date: 6 May 2019
- Track record holder: Brady Kurtz

Major team honours
League Champions	1957, 1967, 2012, 2017, 2019
Knockout Cup winners	2019
Div 2 Champions	1956
Div 2 KO Cup Winners	2000
Elite League Pairs Champions	2004, 2005
Elite Shield Winners	2008, 2013, 2018
Midland Cup	1967, 1968
Charity Shield	2018

The Swindon Robins are a motorcycle speedway team from England, established in 1949 that have competed primarily in the top division of speedway league competition in the United Kingdom. They are five times league champions of the United Kingdom.

The club competed at the Abbey Stadium from inception until the end of the speedway season on 17 October 2019. The club have not competed since due to the uncertainty surrounding the future of their stadium. In March 2025, it was announced that the Abbey Stadium would be demolished for a housing development, with its owners suggesting a new stadium could be constructed near Royal Wootton Bassett.

== History ==
=== Origins and 1940s ===
The formation of the club followed the sport's prehistory in the town at the now-demolished Gorse Hill Aerodrome, where dirt track racing had taken place since 1928.

The birth of the Robins was a product of the partnership of Bristol speedway manager Reg Witcomb and businessman Bert Hearse. Under their direction, a 410-yard (370 m) cinder track was built.

The first meeting, a non-league home challenge match, took place on 23 July 1949 against future rivals Oxford Cheetahs, and an official attendance figure of 8,000 was given, although employees of the club believe that 10,000 would be closer to the truth. The Robins lost their debut meeting 39–45 in a meeting that saw Ginger Nicholls top score for the home side with 11 points on his wedding day. In the process he won the first-ever race, was beaten by an opponent only once, and set the first-ever track record at 82.8 seconds.

The team then joined the 1949 Speedway National League Division Three late in the season, when Reg Witcomb applied to the Speedway Control Board to take over the remaining fixtures of Hull Angels, who had withdrawn from the league. Swindon finished in 11th place.

=== 1950s ===
The first silverware came to the club in 1956 and 1957. In 1956, they won the 1956 Speedway National League Division Two title, finishing one point clear of Southampton Saints, with three riders, Bob Roger, Ian Williams and George White securing 9+ averages for the season. Promotion ensued and the following year Swindon joined the highest league, that of the 1957 Speedway National League. Several riders were brought in to bolster the campaign but it was the same three riders that steered Swindon to back to back league titles.

=== 1960s ===
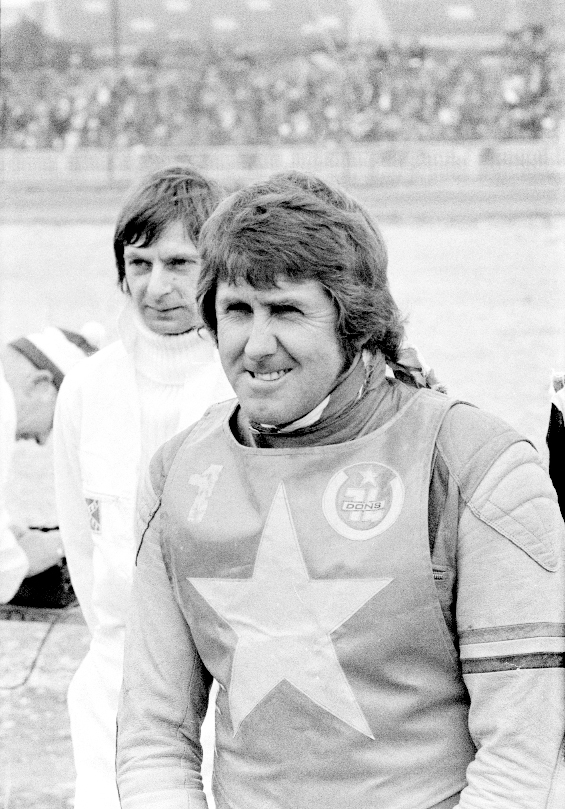
Barry Briggs

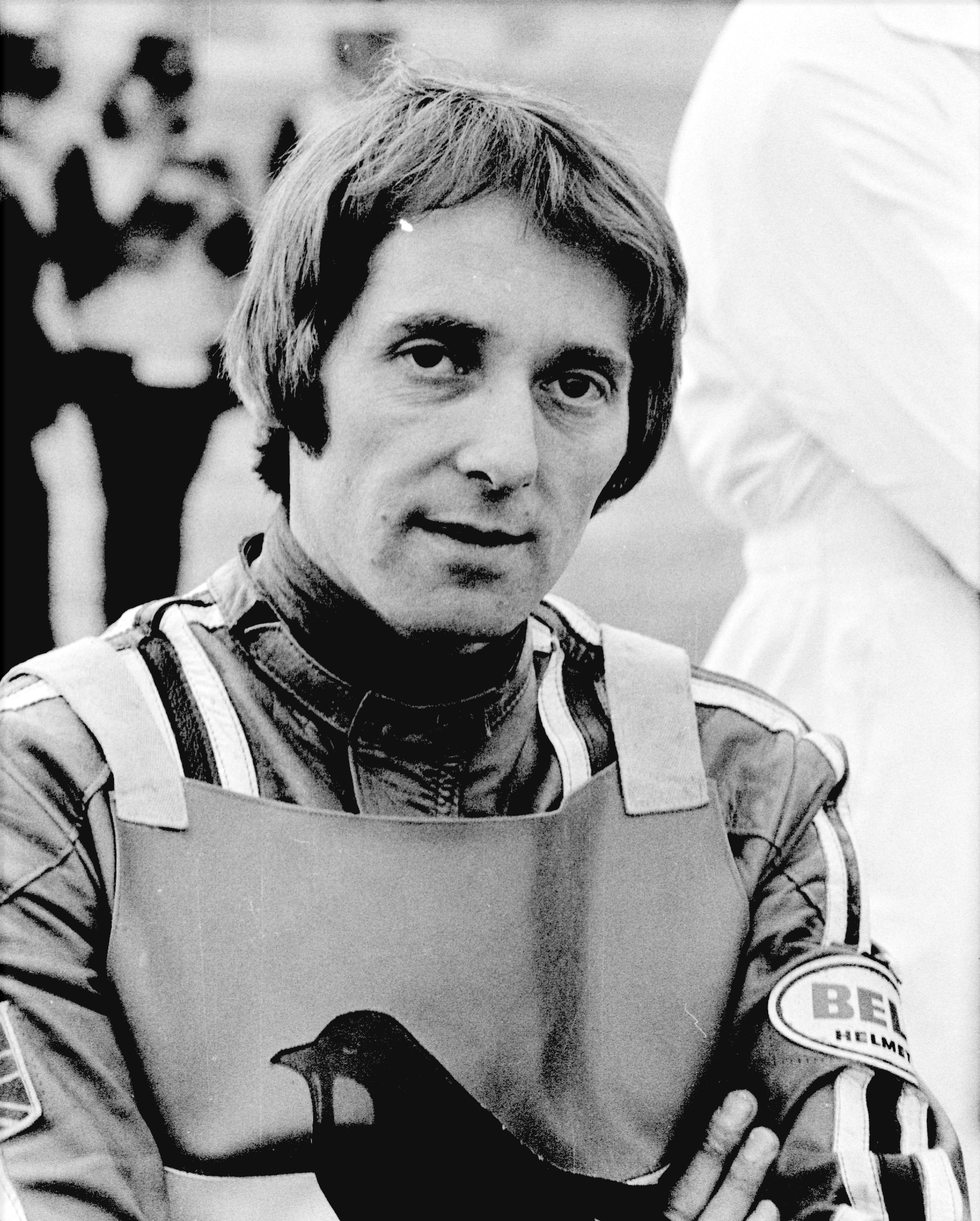
Martin Ashby

The Robins continued to compete in the top division, which became known as the British League in 1965 and during the period the leading riders included Mike Broadbank, Neil Street and Tadeusz Teodorowicz. The Robins strengthened the team in 1964 with the signing of Barry Briggs, who won his third world title during the same year.

The next major success came during the 1967 British League season when Swindon won the league title. Swindon finished with four riders with averages over eight, Barry Briggs topped the entire league with 11.05 but the contributions from Martin Ashby (8.83), Bob Kilby (8.61) and Mike Broadbank (8.55) were pivotal in the Swindon's success. The Robins also won the Midland Cup for two consecutive seasons in 1967 and 1968.

Martin Ashby would go on to ride for Swindon for 16 seasons from 1961 to 1979 and score 5,476.5 points for the club.

=== 1970s ===
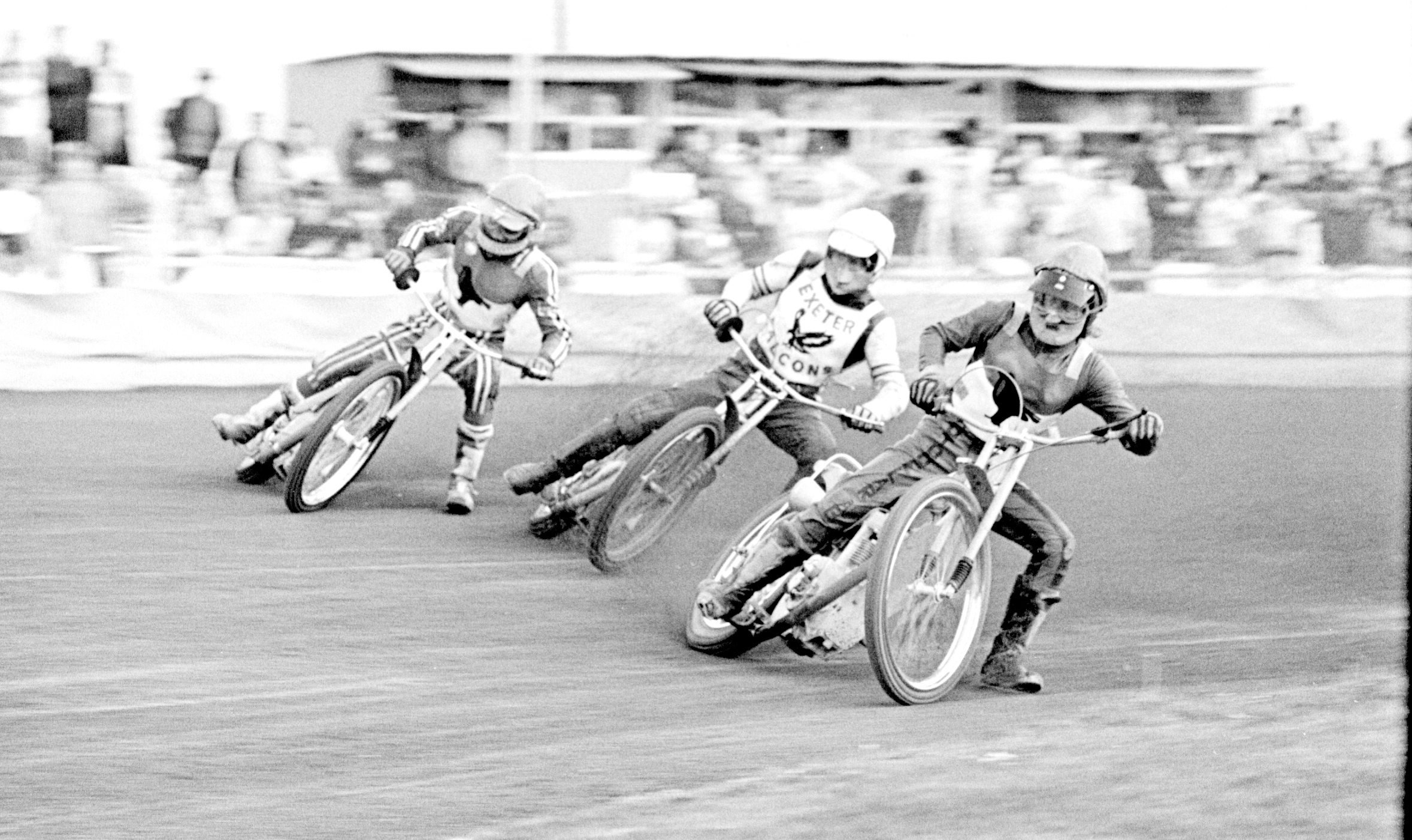
Swindon vs Exeter, circa 1974

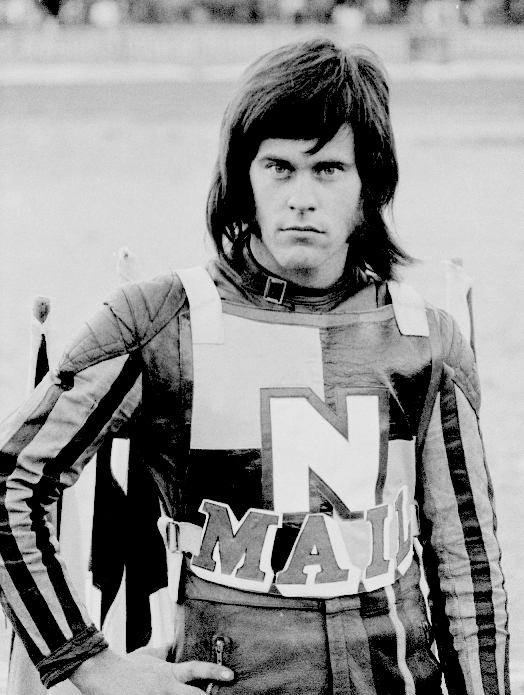
Phil Crump

The 1970s failed to live up to the success of the previous decade but the Robins did manage two fifth place finishes in 1971 and 1976 respectively. The team consisted of various number one riders throughout the period including Briggs, Ashby, Kilby before the signing of Phil Crump in 1979 by the new promoter Wally Mawdsley.

=== 1980s ===
The 1980s followed the same path as the 1970s, with a full decade of top level speedway but with only two third place finishes to show for their efforts in 1981 and 1987. The majority of the decade was led by Swindon stalwart Phil Crump before Jimmy Nilsen took over as the team's number one rider. Phil Crump scored 4,254 points and was the Robins' leading rider for eight years from 1979 to 1986.

=== 1990s ===
In 1990, the club paid £20,000 to Poole Pirates to secure the transfer of Leigh Adams, who would go on to become the number 1 rider at Swindon during three different spells, in addition to being regarded as one of the world's best riders for over a decade. Despite securing his services he lacked support and the Robins suffered a poor 1992 season, finishing last and dropping down to the second division from 1993 to 1994. The team (Tony Olsson and Tony Langdon) won the British League Division Two Pairs Championship, held at Arena Essex Raceway on 28 May 1994.

With the merger of the divisions for the 1995 season, Swindon returned to the top league. Jimmy Nilsen returned to the club in 1996, as did Leigh Adams in 1997 but the club dropped again to the second division in 1999.

=== 2000s ===
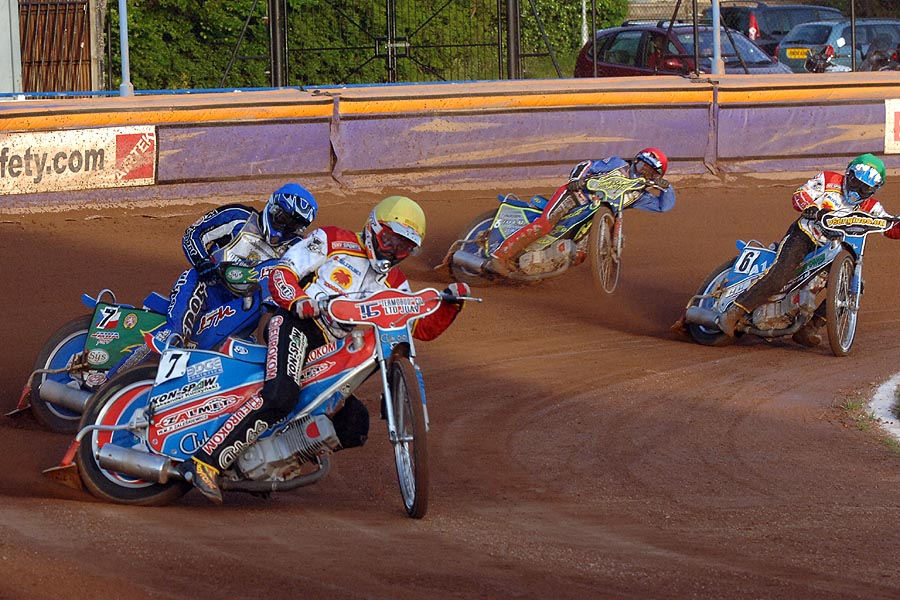
Oxford versus Swindon in 2007

The club experienced success in 2000, winning the Div 2 KO Cup and Young Shield during the 2000 Premier League speedway season, a season in which they were unlucky to finish league runner-up behind Exeter Falcons. The Falcons only won the title on points difference and actually won three less matches than Swindon that season. In 2003, the Robins won the Premier League Four-Team Championship, which was held on 27 July, at the Abbey Stadium.

In 2004, the club returned once again to the top league, which was now called the Elite League and won the Elite League Pairs Championship in both 2004 and 2005.

From 2006 until 2009 the Robins reached four consecutive play offs. During the 2009 Elite League speedway season the Robins finished first in the regular season table but lost in the play off final. The Australian Leigh Adams was the best rider in the league, topping the averages twice and was the track record holder, with a time of 63.86 seconds, on 31 August 2009.

=== 2010s ===
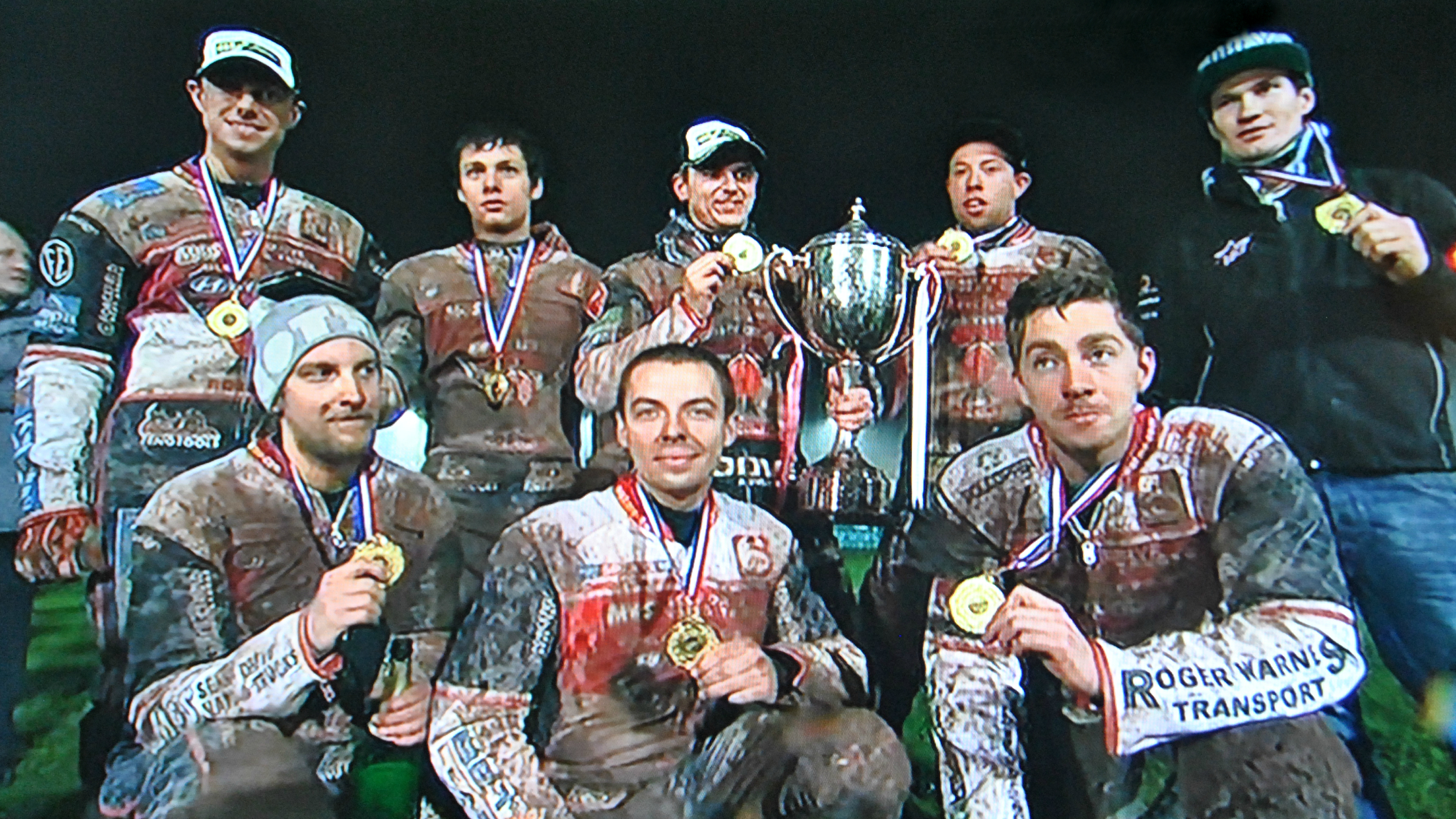
The team celebrating the Elite League title win in 2012

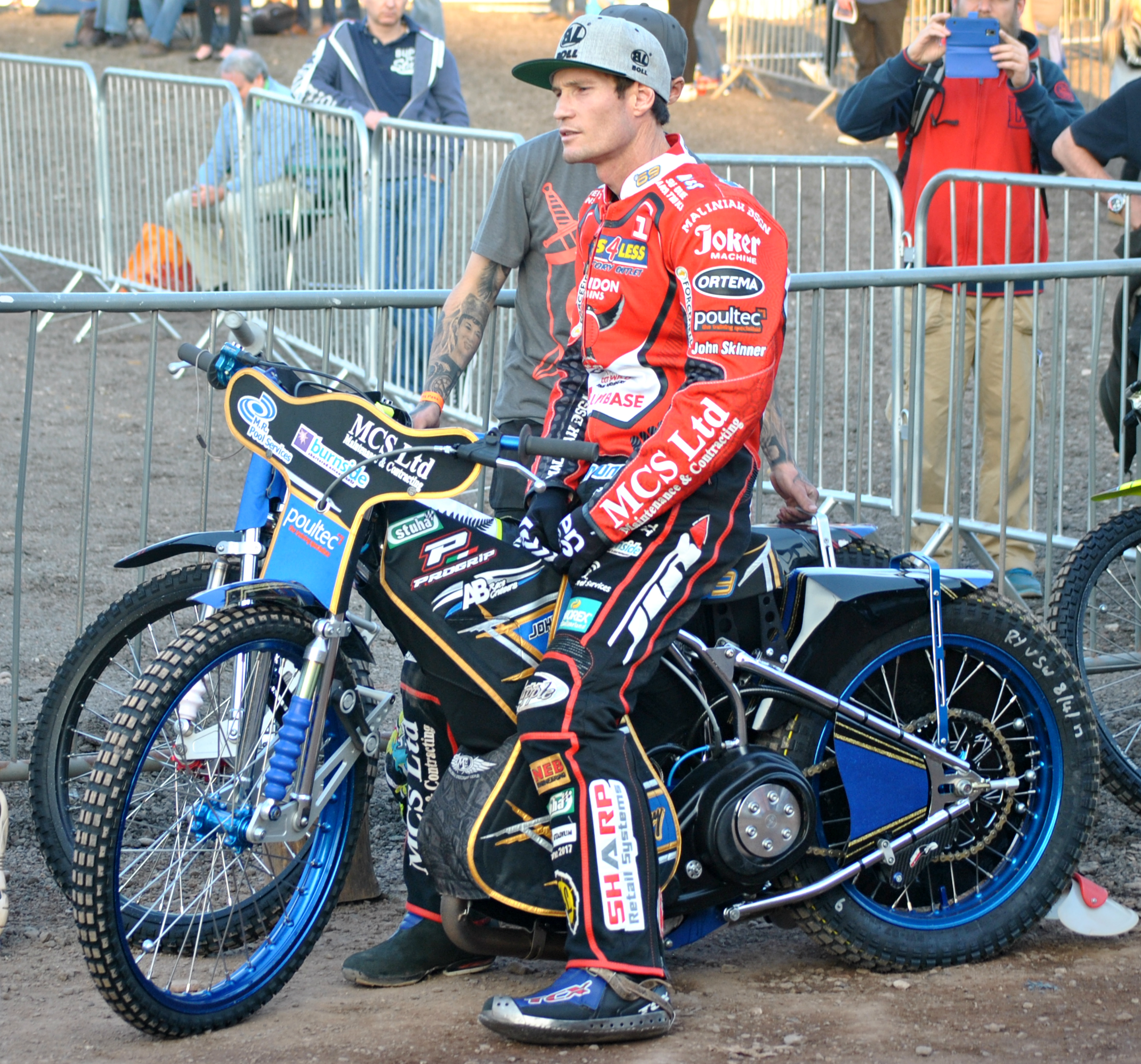
Jason Doyle (in Swindon colours), topped the UK averages and won the league with Swindon in 2017

Following difficult campaigns in 2010 (when Adams left the club) and 2011, Swindon signed Denmark's Peter Kildemand, former world #5 Hans Andersen and Australian international Troy Batchelor, who rode for the Robins in 2008 and part of the 2009 season. Alun Rossiter also returned as team manager after a 2-year spell with Coventry, with whom he won the Elite League in 2010. In 2012, the Robins won the Elite League title after beating the Poole Pirates 95–89 on aggregate following a 45-year wait for glory.

In 2013, 2014 and 2015, the Robins made the semi-finals of the playoffs, but failed to advance further. At the start of the 2015 season, Swindon's No 1 Adrian Miedziński was injured in the first meeting at the Abbey, with Peter Kildemand filling in on a temporary basis before the club signed Australian international Darcy Ward. However, Ward suffered a career-ending accident while riding in Poland, and Kildemand once again stepped in to complete the season. The 2016 Robins team was nicknamed Roscos Roo's, because it contained five Australians in addition to the required two British reserves.

In 2017, the Robins won the League Championship play off final against Wolverhampton Wolves despite losing the first leg at their home track. Jason Doyle was instrumental in helping Swindon claim the crown.

Due to stadium issues, a new stadium was planned to be built for the 2018 season but this did not happen and at the start of the 2019 season, the Abbey Stadium was reduced in size to 320 metres from its original 363 metres. It turned out to be their last season at the Abbey Stadium.

=== 2020s ===
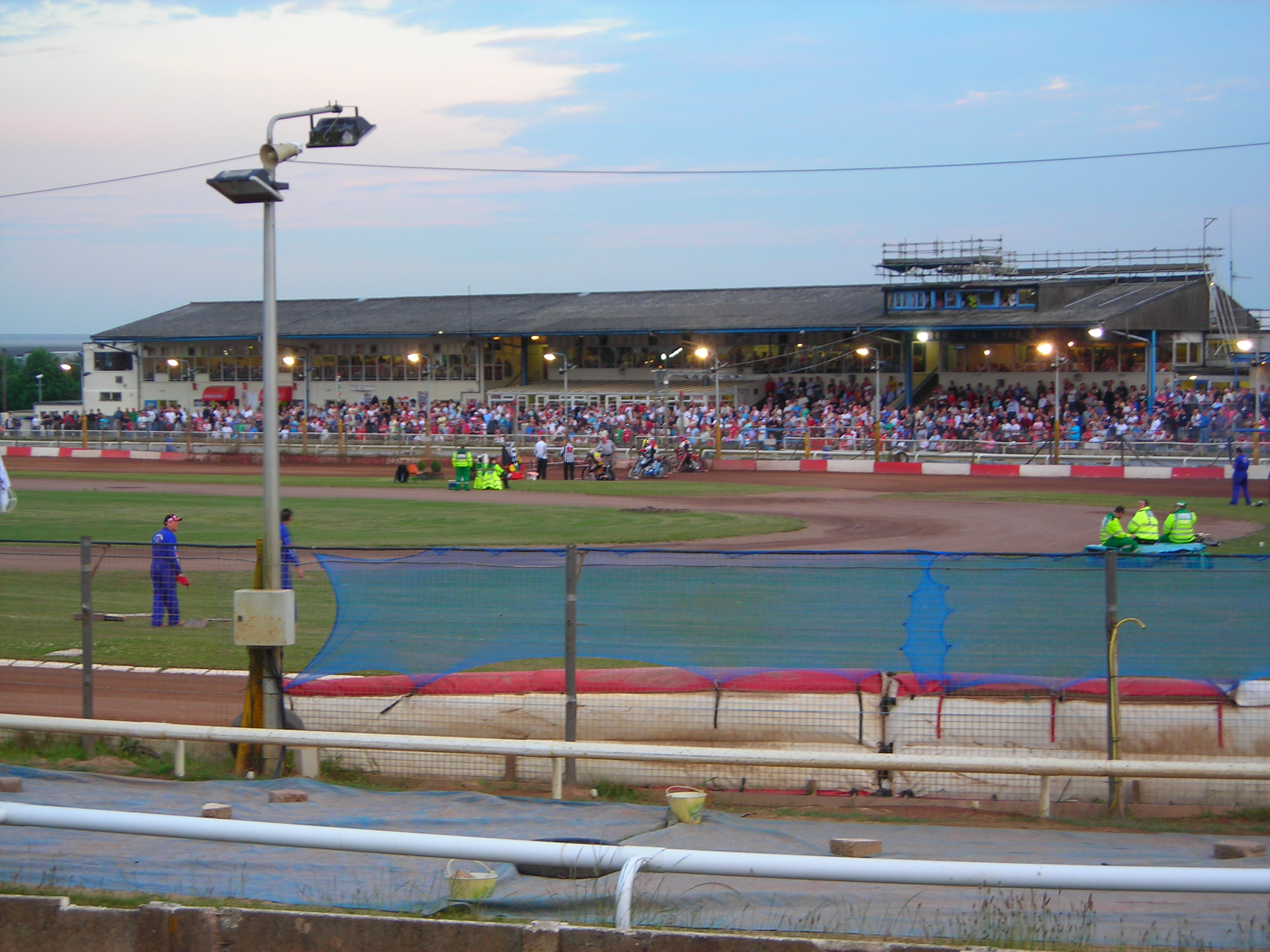
The Abbey Stadium, the home of Swindon Robins from 1949 to 2019

Due to the COVID-19 pandemic, the 2020 SGB Premiership was completely cancelled and in January 2021, the Robins confirmed their withdrawal from the 2021 season, citing uncertainty around the potential redevelopment of their stadium. The Robins' promoter, Terry Russell, confirmed that the team would not be fielding a team in the 2022 season due to uncertainty over when the new stadium would be completed. In December 2022, a stand-off continued between the council and builders Taylor Wimpey over the stadium's perimeter and its expected redevelopment. Around that time Clarke Osborne of Gaming International issued a press release calling for sites, seeking a 5,000 capacity stadium to host speedway, karting and car racing.

== Season summary ==
Extended content

Year and league	Position	Notes
1949 Speedway National League Division Three	11th	replaced Hull Angels
1950 Speedway National League Division Three	4th	
1951 Speedway National League Division Three	5th	
1952 Speedway Southern League	6th	
1953 Speedway Southern League	4th	
1954 Speedway National League Division Two	3rd	
1955 Speedway National League Division Two	8th	
1956 Speedway National League Division Two	1st	champions
1957 Speedway National League	1st	champions
1958 Speedway National League	6th	
1959 Speedway National League	8th	
1960 Speedway National League	10th	
1961 Speedway National League	5th	
1962 Speedway National League	6th	
1963 Speedway National League	5th	
1964 Speedway National League	5th	
1965 British League season	15th	
1966 British League season	3rd	
1967 British League season	1st	champions, Midland Cup
1968 British League season	11th	Midland Cup
1969 British League season	10th	
1970 British League season	16th	
1971 British League season	5th	
1972 British League season	15th	
1973 British League season	13th	
1974 British League season	12th	
1975 British League season	18th	
1976 British League season	5th	
1977 British League season	11th	
1978 British League season	16th	
1979 British League season	8th	
1980 British League season	8th	
1981 British League season	3rd	
1982 British League season	8th	
1983 British League season	15th	
1984 British League season	9th	
1985 British League season	8th	
1986 British League season	8th	
1987 British League season	3rd	
1988 British League season	7th	
1989 British League season	6th	
1990 British League season	6th	
1991 British League season	13th	
1992 British League season	13th	
1993 British League Division Two season	4th	
1994 British League Division Two season	4th	Pairs
1995 Premier League speedway season	11th	
1996 Premier League speedway season	4th	
1997 Elite League speedway season	3rd	
1998 Elite League speedway season	4th	
1999 Premier League speedway season	4th	
2000 Premier League speedway season	2nd	Knockout Cup, Young Shield winners
2001 Premier League speedway season	5th	
2002 Premier League speedway season	6th	
2003 Premier League speedway season	4th	Fours
2004 Elite League speedway season	6th	Pairs
2005 Elite League speedway season	7th	Pairs
2006 Elite League speedway season	3rd	PO semi final
2007 Elite League speedway season	2nd	lost in PO final
2008 Elite League speedway season	3rd	PO semi final, Elite Shield
2009 Elite League speedway season	1st	lost in PO final
2010 Elite League speedway season	6th	
2011 Elite League speedway season	10th	
2012 Elite League speedway season	2nd	champions, won play off final
2013 Elite League speedway season	2nd	PO semi final
2014 Elite League speedway season	4th	PO semi final
2015 Elite League speedway season	3rd	PO semi final
2016 Elite League speedway season	5th	
SGB Premiership 2017	1st	champions, won play off final
SGB Premiership 2018	5th	
SGB Premiership 2019	2nd	champions, won play off final & Knockout Cup winners

== Season summary (juniors) ==
Extended content

Year and league	Position	Notes
1996 Speedway Conference League	5th	Sprockets
1997 Speedway Conference League	7th	Raven Sprockets (with Reading)
2003 Speedway Conference League	5th	Sprockets
2004 Speedway Conference League	10th	Sprockets

== Riders previous seasons ==
Extended content

2019 team

- (Australia) Jason Doyle
- (Australia) Troy Batchelor
- (Denmark) Rasmus Jensen
- (England) Adam Ellis
- (Poland) Tobiasz Musielak
- (Denmark) Claus Vissing
- (England) Ellis Perks

2018 team

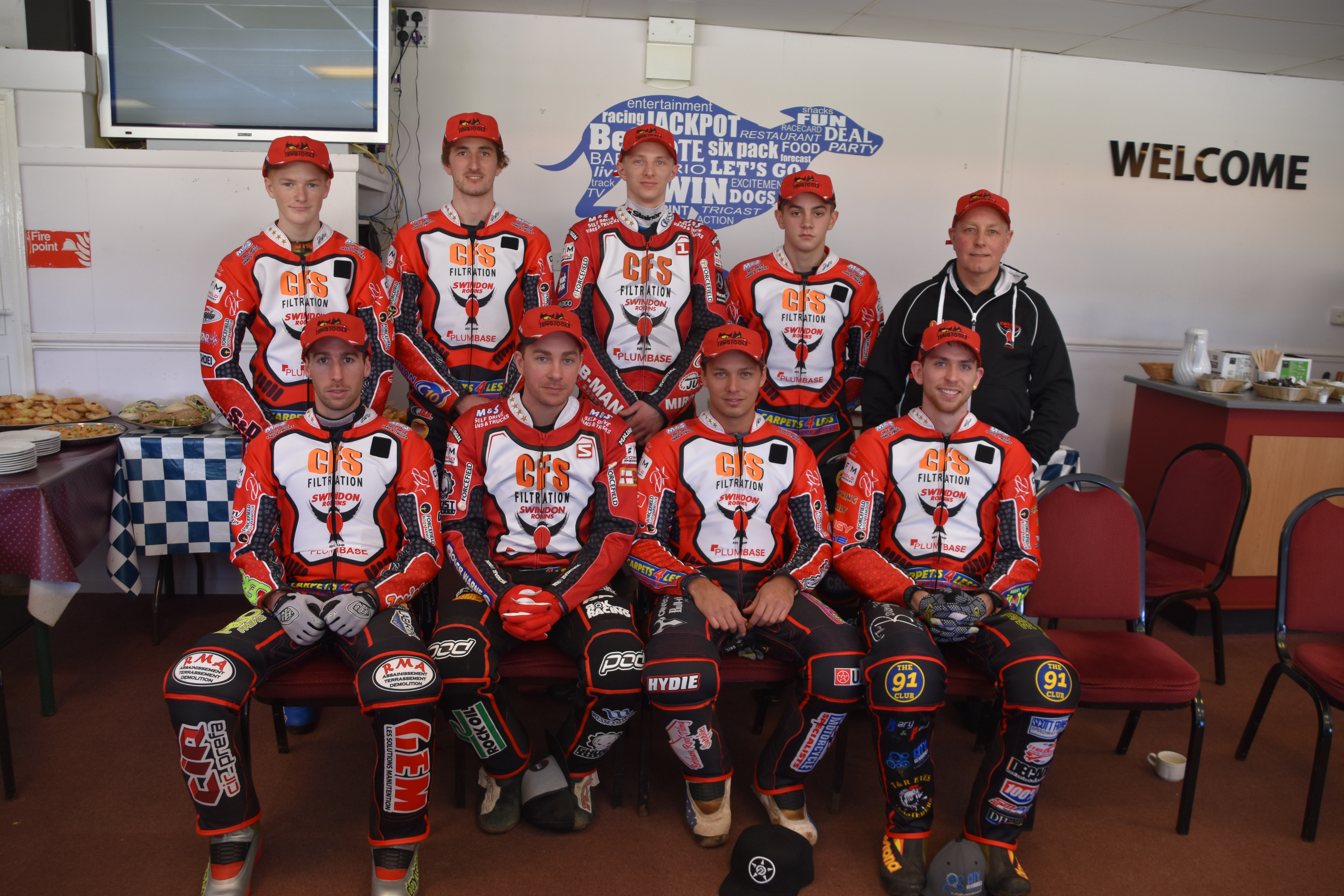
2018 Team

- (Australia) Nick Morris
- (Poland) Tobiasz Musielak
- (England) Zach Wajtknecht
- (England) Adam Ellis
- (France) David Bellego
- (Australia) Troy Batchelor
- (Australia) Mitchell Davey

2017 team

- (Australia) Jason Doyle
- (France) David Bellego
- (England) Adam Ellis
- (Australia) Nick Morris
- (Denmark) Emil Grondal
- (Poland) Tobiasz Musielak
- (England) Zach Wajtknecht
- (New Zealand) Bradley Wilson-Dean

2016 team

- (Australia) Jason Doyle
- (Australia) Nick Morris
- (Australia) Josh Grajczonek
- (Australia) Rohan Tungate
- (Australia) Justin Sedgmen
- (England) Charles Wright
- (England) Stefan Nielsen

2010 team

- (Sweden) Thomas H. Jonasson
- (Australia) Leigh Adams
- (Poland) Grzegorz Zengota
- (Denmark) Mads Korneliussen
- (England) Simon Stead
- (Denmark) Morten Risager
- (Australia) Cory Gathercole
- (England) Jordan Frampton
- (England) Steve Boxall (No 8)
- (Poland) Maciej Janowski

2009 team

- (Australia) Leigh Adams
- (Slovenia) Matej Zagar
- (England) Simon Stead
- (Australia) Travis McGowan
- (Denmark) Morten Risager
- (England) Paul Hurry
- (Australia) Mark Lemon
- (United States) Ryan Fisher
- (Australia) Cory Gathercole (No. 8)

Also Rode:

- (Australia) Troy Batchelor
- (Croatia) Jurica Pavlic
- (Poland) Krzysztof Stojanowski
- (Australia) Richard Sweetman (as No. 8)

2008 team

- (Australia) Leigh Adams
- (Australia) Travis McGowan
- (England) James Wright
- (Australia) Troy Batchelor
- (Croatia) Jurica Pavlic
- (Denmark) Mads Korneliussen
- (Austria) Manuel Hauzinger
- (Australia) Cory Gathercole (No.8)

Also Rode:

- (Netherlands) Theo Pijper
- (Sweden) Sebastian Aldén
- (Australia) Joel Parsons (as No.8)

2007 team

- (Australia) Leigh Adams
- (Poland) Sebastian Ułamek
- (Denmark) Charlie Gjedde
- (England) Lee Richardson
- (Poland) Tomasz Chrzanowski
- (Poland) Damian Baliński
- (England) Andrew Moore
- (Australia) Cory Gathercole (No.8)

Also rode:

- (Denmark) Mads Korneliussen

2006 team

- (Australia) Leigh Adams
- (Poland) Sebastian Aldén
- (Denmark) Mads Korneliussen
- (England) Lee Richardson
- (Poland) Tomasz Chrzanowski
- (Poland) Sebastian Ułamek
- (Poland) Adrian Miedziński
- (England) Ritchie Hawkins
- (Russia) Renat Gafurov

== Club honours ==
- National League Champions: 1957
- British League Champions: 1967
- Elite League Champions: 2012
- SGB Premiership Champions: 2017, 2019
- National League Division Two Champions: 1956
- Premiership Supporters KO Cup Winners: 2019
- Premier League KO Cup Winners: 2000
- Premier League Four-Team Championship Winners: 2003
- Young Shield Winners: 2000
- Midland Cup Winners: 1967, 1968, 1994
- Elite Shield Winners: 2008, 2018

Elite League Pairs Championship

- 2004 (Leigh Adams and Charlie Gjedde)
- 2005 (Leigh Adams and Lee Richardson)

British League Division Two Best Pairs

- 1994 (Tony Olsson and Tony Langdon)

== Individual honours ==
World Champion

- (New Zealand) Barry Briggs (1964 and 1966)
- (Australia) Jason Doyle (2017)

World Under-21 Champion

- (Sweden) Peter Nahlin (1988)
- (Australia) Leigh Adams (1992)

World Ice Speedway Champion

- (Sweden) Erik Stenlund (1988)

British Speedway Championship

- (New Zealand) Barry Briggs (1964, 1965, 1966, 1967 & 1969)
- (England) Steve Bastable (1981)

British League Riders' Championship

- (New Zealand) Barry Briggs (1965, 1966, 1967, 1968, 1969, 1970)

British League Division Two Riders Championship

- (New Zealand) Gary Allan (1993)

== Notable riders ==
- (Australia) Leigh Adams
- (Denmark) Hans Andersen
- (England) Martin Ashby
- (New Zealand) Barry Briggs
- (England) Mike Broadbank
- (Australia) Jason Crump
- (Australia) Phil Crump
- (Australia) Jason Doyle
- (England) Paul Fry
- (Denmark) Charlie Gjedde
- (Denmark) Brian Karger
- (England) Bob Kilby
- (Sweden) Jimmy Nilsen
- (Denmark) Bo Petersen
- (England) Lee Richardson
- (England) Bob Roger
- (England) Alun Rossiter
- (England) Simon Stead
- (Australia) Neil Street
- (Poland) Tadeusz Teodorowicz
- (England) George White
- (Wales) Ian Williams

== All-time points scorers ==
Rider	Total Points	Average
Leigh Adams	6442.5	9.72
Martin Ashby	5476.5	8.61
Phil Crump	4254	9.52
Mike Broadbank	4239	7.84
Bob Kilby	4192	7.95
Jimmy Nilsen	3815	8.41
Barry Briggs	3681	10.71
Ian Williams	3452.5	7.54
Brian Karger	2754	7.60
Neil Street	1802.5	7.45
