= Peterborough Panthers =

Former British motorcycle speedway team

Club information
- Track address: East of England Showground; Peterborough
- Country: England
- Founded: 1970
- Closed: 2023
- Website: peterborough-speedway.com

Club facts
- Colours: Red and Black
- Track size: 337 Metres
- Track record time: 57.2 seconds
- Track record date: 19 July 2021
- Track record holder: Dan Bewley

Major team honours
United Kingdom Champions	1999, 2006, 2021
Knockout Cup Winners	1999, 2001
Fours Winners	1997
Elite Shield	2007
Craven Shield	1999
tier 2 Champions	1992, 1998
Division 2 KO Cup Winners	1992, 2017
tier 2 Pairs Winners	1998
tier 2 Fours Winners	1977, 1978, 1988, 1989, 1992, 1998, 2017
tier 3 Champions	1997, 2002
Midland Development League Champions	2017, 2018

The Peterborough Panthers were a British motorcycle speedway team based in Peterborough, England from 1970 to 2023. They were three times champions of the United Kingdom, winning the highest level league in 1999, 2006 and 2021.

== History ==
=== Origins and 1970s ===
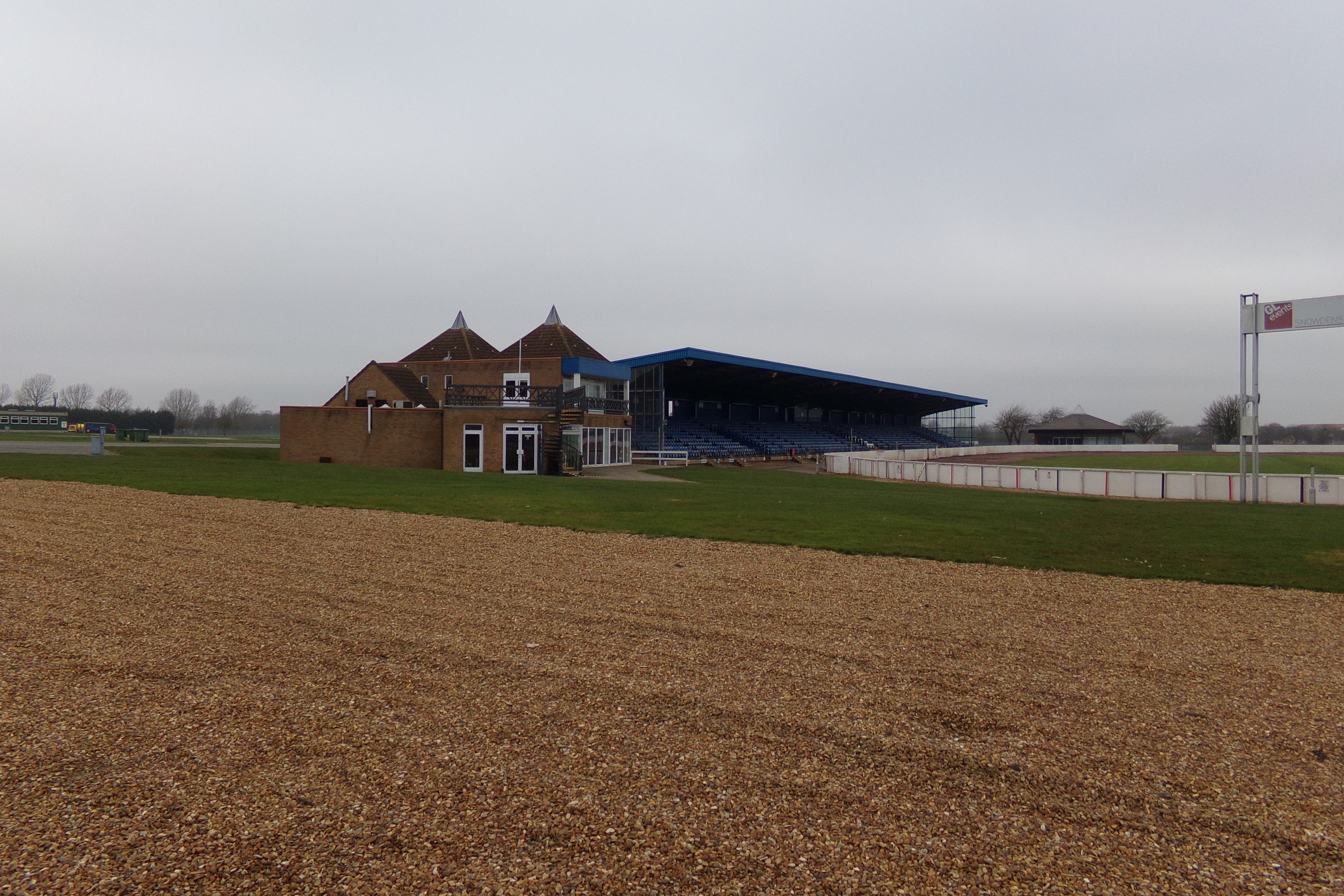
East of England Arena

Speedway in Peterborough began in 1970, following a failed attempt to race at the Peterborough Greyhound Stadium and a subsequent successful application by Allied Presentations (headed by Maurice Littlechild) to race at the East of England Showground. Despite receiving a licence, the team were initially refused entry to the league by the Speedway Control Board but then replaced Plymouth Devils for their inaugural season in the 1970 British League Division Two. The Panthers finished in 10th place.

The Panthers remained in division 2 (the National League from 1975) and recorded a best placing of third in 1972, headed by riders Richard Greer and John Davis. The next significant moment was winning the first silverware, after securing consecutive Fours championships in 1977 and 1978. Only Nigel Flatman appeared in both of the fours finals.

=== 1980s ===
The Panthers continued in the National League during the 1980s, but the decade was one of mediocrity with a highest placing of 5th in 1987. The highlight of the decade was winning two more fours championships in 1988 and 1989. Three riders, Ian Barney, Craig Hodgson and Mick Poole rode in both.

=== 1990s ===
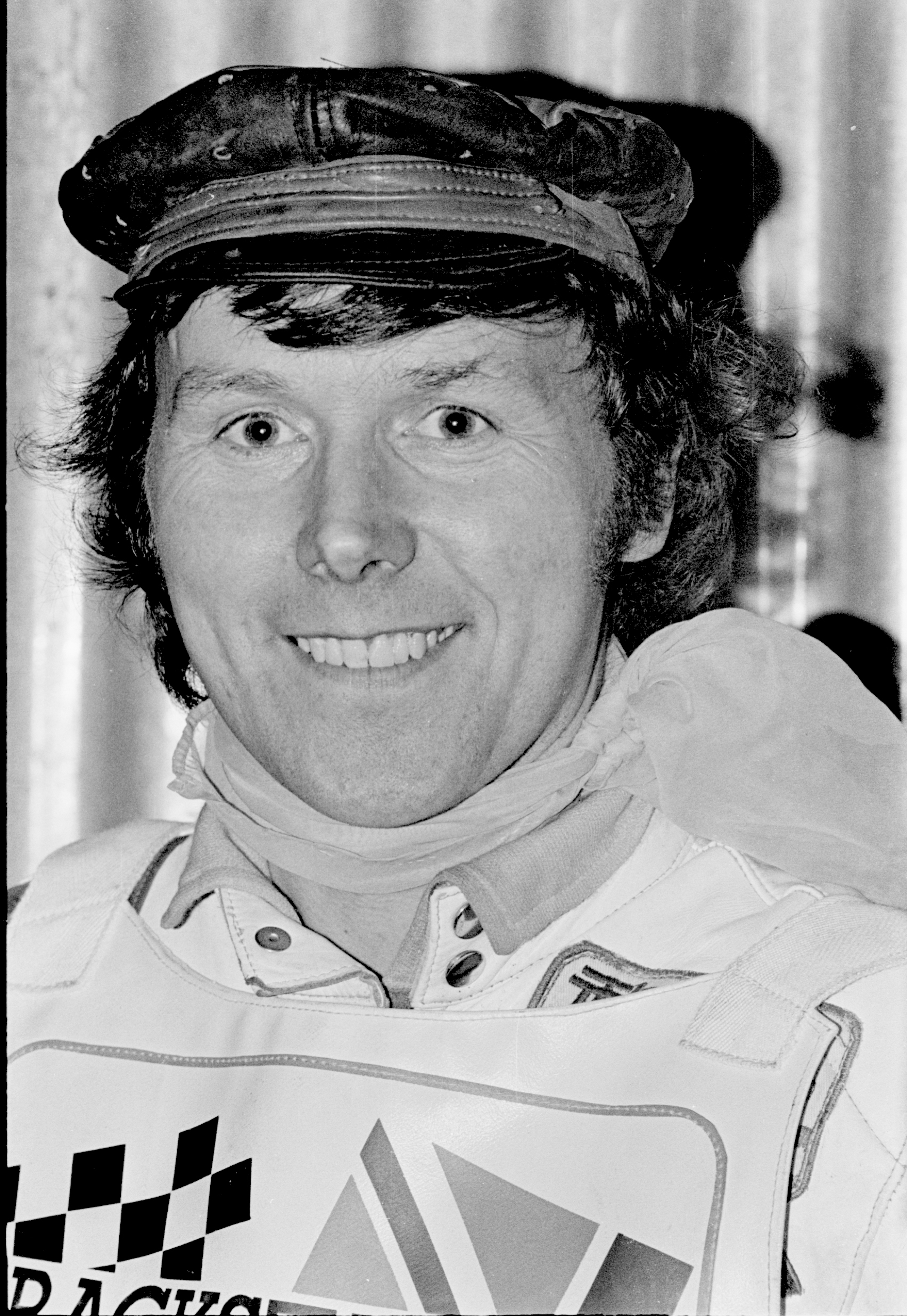
Brian Clark rode for the Panthers for ten years

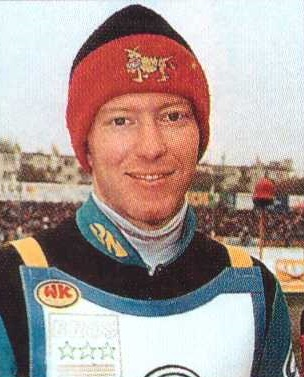
Jason Crump helped the Panthers win their first league title in 1992

After signing Australian's Jason Crump and Stephen Davies to join fellow Aussie Mick Poole, the club's first major success arrived during the 1992 British League Division Two season. The Panthers won the league and cup double in addition to the fours.

Following 25 consecutive years in the second tier, the Panthers joined the newly merged 1995 Premier League speedway season, meaning that the Panthers competed in the top division for the first time in their history. However, the team dropped down a division in 1998, which brought immediate success, winning the league, pairs and fours. The following season they went up to the Elite League (Div 1) and completely rebuilt their team for the season. They brought in three Australians, the returning Jason Crump from Oxford, Ryan Sullivan from Poole and Craig Watson from Newport, in addition to recalling Zdeněk Tesař. Peterborough pipped Poole by one point and beat them in the cup final to achieve the league and cup double and the Craven Shield win. Crump won the Riders' Championship and topped the averages.

=== 2000s ===
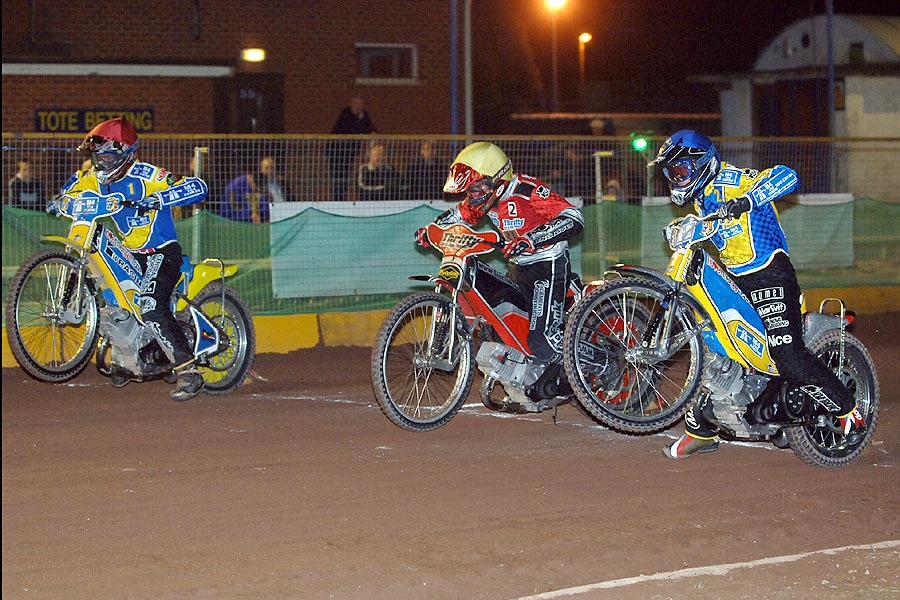
Peterborough versus Oxford in 2007

Another Knockout Cup was added to the trophy cabinet in 2001 and the team won the league title during the 2006 Elite League speedway season. Peterborough and Reading battled each other throughout the season finishing level on points in the regular season table before Peterborough edged Reading in the play off final. Peterborough had a strong all round squad and included Danish trio of Hans Andersen, Jesper Jensen and Niels Kristian Iversen, in addition to Australian Ryan Sullivan.

=== 2010s ===
The team continued to compete in the highest league despite problems leading up to the 2011 season. Following changes to the rules for rider averages made at the AGM of the BSPA, the Panthers and Coventry Bees walked out of the meeting. As a result the BSPA omitted both teams from the 2011 Elite League for failing to declare their intent to compete. The decision was the subject of a legal challenge by both clubs. The BSPA offered a compromise which was initially rejected before both teams confirmed their starting places.

The team had a record Elite League victory on 23 August 2013, beating Coventry Bees by 70 points to 20 The Panthers dropped to the second division from 2014 to 2018 but won the 2017 division 2 Knockout Cup and fours during the period. In 2019, the team rejoined the highest league called the SGB Premiership.

=== 2020s ===
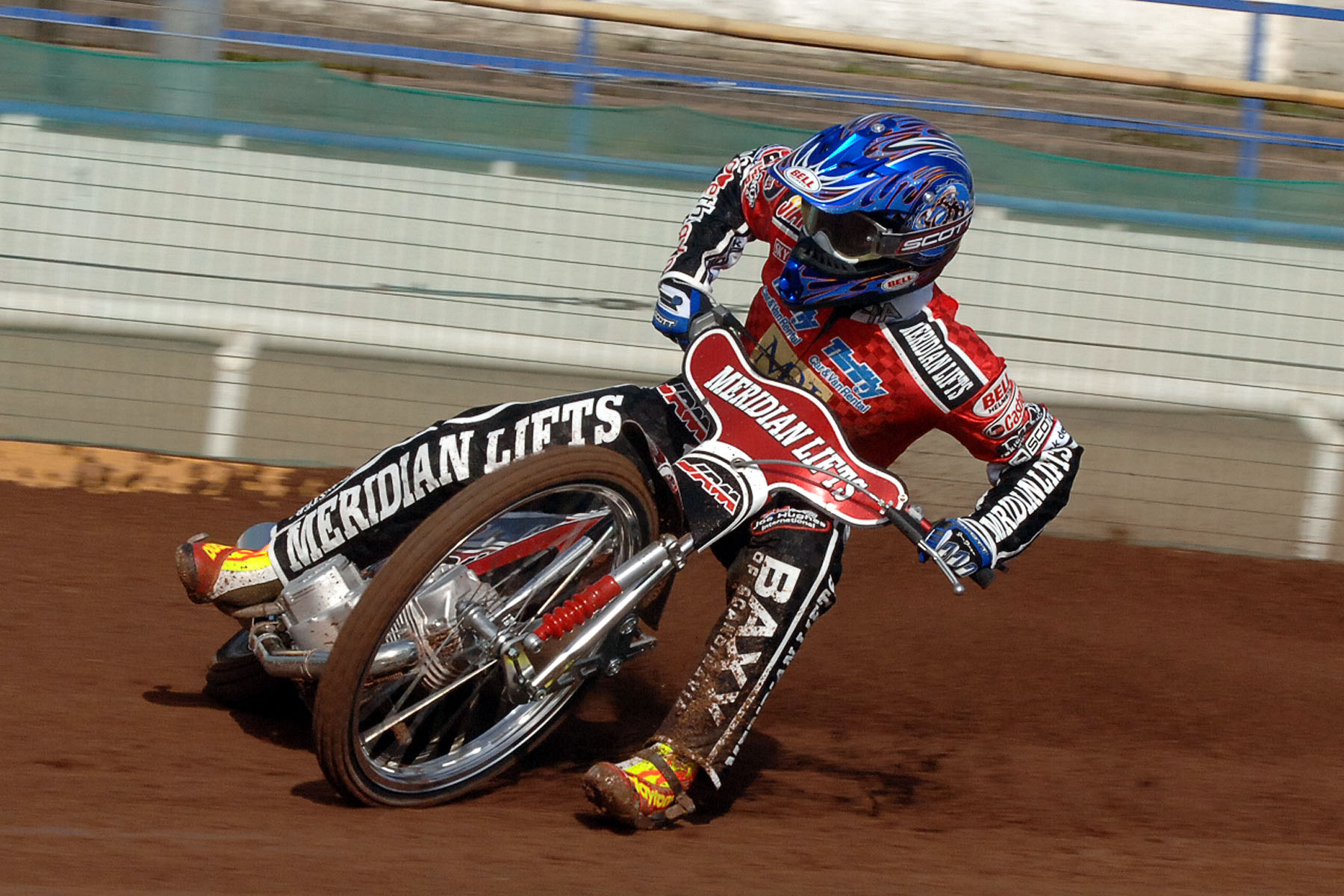
Hans Andersen in Peterborough colours and part of the Dad's Army

After the leagues were cancelled in 2020 due to the COVID-19 pandemic, the Panthers won the highest league title for just the third time in their history in 2021. After finishing top of the regular season table by just one point, they overtook the long time leaders Wolverhampton Wolves and by virtue of finishing top they elected to play Wolves in the play off semi finals, rather than the third or fourth placed teams Belle Vue and Sheffield. Peterborough then deservedly won the playoffs by beating Wolverhampton in the semifinals and Belle Vue in the final. The Peterborough team gained the nickname the 'Dad's Army' due to the fact that four of their riders were aged 40 or older.

The 2023 season was the last season for Peterborough at the East of England Showground, following the redevelopment of the Arena by owners Asset Earning Power Group (AEPG) and the club were disbanded.

== Season summary ==
Extended content

Year and league	Position	Notes
1970 British League Division Two season	10th	
1971 British League Division Two season	16th	
1972 British League Division Two season	3rd	
1973 British League Division Two season	4th	
1974 British League Division Two season	8th	
1975 New National League season	18th	
1976 National League season	9th	
1977 National League season	5th	
1978 National League season	6th	
1979 National League season	8th	
1980 National League season	8th	
1981 National League season	9th	
1982 National League season	13th	
1983 National League season	12th	
1984 National League season	15th	
1985 National League season	7th	
1986 National League season	10th	
1987 National League season	5th	
1988 National League season	8th	
1989 National League season	11th	
1990 National League season	10th	
1991 British League Division Two season	12th	
1992 British League Division Two season	1st	Champions & Knockout Cup winners
1993 British League Division Two season	3rd	
1994 British League Division Two season	5th	
1995 Premier League speedway season	4th	
1996 Premier League speedway season	2nd	
1997 Elite League speedway season	10th	
1998 Premier League speedway season	1st	Champions
1999 Elite League speedway season	1st	Champions & Knockout Cup winners
2000 Elite League speedway season	7th	
2001 Elite League speedway season	5th	Knockout Cup winners
2002 Elite League speedway season	5th	
2003 Elite League speedway season	3rd	
2004 Elite League speedway season	9th	
2005 Elite League speedway season	3rd	
2006 Elite League speedway season	1st	Champions (PO winners)
2007 Elite League speedway season	3rd	
2008 Elite League speedway season	9th	
2009 Elite League speedway season	5th	
2010 Elite League speedway season	3rd	
2011 Elite League speedway season	6th	
2012 Elite League speedway season	6th	
2013 Elite League speedway season	7th	
2014 Premier League speedway season	7th	
2015 Premier League speedway season	4th	lost in PO semi finals
2016 Premier League speedway season	8th	
SGB Championship 2017	6th	Knockout Cup winners
SGB Championship 2018	1st	lost in PO semi finals
SGB Premiership 2019	7th	
SGB Premiership 2021	1st	champions
SGB Premiership 2022	6th	
SGB Premiership 2023	6th	

== Season summary (juniors) ==
Extended content

Year and league	Position	Notes
1996 Speedway Conference League	9th	Thundercats
1997 Speedway Conference League	1st	Thundercats, Champions
2000 Speedway Conference League	10th	Pumas
2001 Speedway Conference League	5th	Pumas
2002 Speedway Conference League	1st	Pumas, Champions
2003 Speedway Conference League	12th	Pumas

== Notable riders ==
- (Denmark) Hans N. Andersen
- (England) Ian Barney
- (Denmark) Kenneth Bjerre
- (England) Brian Clark
- (Australia) Jason Crump
- (England) Glenn Cunningham
- (Australia) Stephen Davies
- (Czech Republic) Aleš Dryml, Jr.
- (Czech Republic) Lukáš Dryml
- (England) Nigel Flatman
- (England) Richard Greer
- (England) Chris Harris
- (Australia) Craig Hodgson
- (Denmark) Niels Kristian Iversen
- (Sweden) Peter Karlsson
- (England) Scott Nicholls
- (Denmark) Ulrich Østergaard
- (Denmark) Michael Palm Toft
- (Australia) Mick Poole
- (Australia) Ryan Sullivan

== Honours ==
Elite League League Champions (2) – 1999, 2006, 2021. Play Off’s (6) – 2002, 2003 2004, 2006, 2007 & 2010. Knockout Cup Winners (2) – 1999 & 2001. Knockout Cup Runners Up (1) – 2002. Craven Shield Winners (1) – 1999. Craven Shield Runners Up (1) – 2001. Elite Shield Winners (1) – 2007. Premiership Runners Up (1) – 1997. 4TT Champions (1) – 1997. Midland League Runners Up (1) – 2009. League Riders Champions (2) – J Crump 1999 & R Sullivan 2000. British Champions (1) – M Loram 2001. British U21 Champions (1) – D Howe 2000.

Premier League

League Champions (1) – 1998. League Runners Up (1) – 1996. KO Cup Runners Up (2) – 1996 & 1998. Young Shield Runners Up (1) – 1998. 4TT Champions (1) – 1998. 4TT Runners Up (2) – 1995 & 1996. League Riders Champion (2) – G Cunningham 1998; Ulrich Østergaard 2015. Pairs Champions (1) – G Cunningham & B Woodifield 1998.

British League (Div 2) – Seasons (9)

League Champions (1) – 1992. Ko Cup Winners (1) – 1992. Ko Cup Runners Up (1) – 1972. Premiership Winners (1) – 1993. 4TT Champions (1) – 1992.

National League – Seasons (16)

4TT Champions (4) – 1977, 1978, 1988, 1989. Gold Cup Runners Up (1) – 1991. League Riders Champion (1) – I Barney 1984.
