= 2026 SGB Premiership =

91st season of British Speedway

- League: Premiership
- No. of competitors: 6
- Champions: Belle Vue Aces
- Knockout Cup: Leicester Lions
- Highest average: Dan Bewley
- Division/s below: 2026 Championship; 2026 NDL

The 2026 SGB Premiership was the 91st season of the top tier of British speedway and the ninth known as the SGB Premiership. Ipswich Witches were the defending champions, while Leicester Lions were the defending Knockout Cup champions.

Locations of the 2026 SGB Premiership teams

== Summary ==
The league consisted of six teams after Birmingham Brummies and Oxford Spires left and a new team called Northampton Foxes joined. The Brummies had no home after the closure of Perry Barr Stadium and the Oxford promotion only entered teams for the Championship and NDL.

Ipswich started the season with new owners, the Silverstone based company Mayfield.

The rules remained similar to the previous season except for the play offs, where 2nd and 3rd finishers in the regular season league table would meet to determine who would play the 1st place team in the grand final. A 37 points limit for six riders was agreed, with one rising star place at seven.

== League ==
=== Regular season ===
League table

Pos.	Club	M	Home			Away			F	A	B	Pts	+/−
Pos.	Club	M	W	D	L	W	D	L	F	A	B	Pts	+/−
1	Belle Vue Aces **(Q)**	20	10	0	0	5	0	5	1003	796	9	39	+207
2	Leicester Lions **(Q)**	20	9	0	1	2	0	8	894	906	5	27	-12
3	Sheffield Tigers **(Q)**	20	9	0	1	1	1	8	913	874	5	26	+39
4	Ipswich Witches **(Q)**	20	8	0	2	2	0	8	872	926	5	25	-54
5	King's Lynn Stars	20	6	1	3	1	0	9	870	917	5	20	-47
6	Northampton Foxes	20	5	1	4	0	1	9	832	965	1	13	-133

A fixtures

Home \ Away	BEL	IPS	KLN	LEI	NOR	SHF
Belle Vue		51–39	53–37	61–29	53–37	50–40
Ipswich	50–40		50–40	42–48	47–43	52–38
King's Lynn	41–49	54–36		43–47	48–42	49–41
Leicester	46–44	55–35	51–39		57–33	49–41
Northampton	42–47	44–46	48–42	48–42		42–48
Sheffield	54–36	52–38	44–46	53–37	58–32	

Source: https://britishspeedway.co.uk/2026-premiership-table-fixtures-results/
Legend: Blue = home team win; Yellow = draw; Red = away team win.

B fixtures

Home \ Away	BEL	IPS	KLN	LEI	NOR	SHF
Belle Vue		62–28	48–42	61–29	57–33	53–37
Ipswich	41–49		51–38	50–40	47–42	48–42
King's Lynn	40–50	48–42		52–38	45–45	50–40
Leicester	49–41	42–48	51–39		49–41	58–32
Northampton	35–55	47–43	47–43	47–43		45–45
Sheffield	47–43	51–39	43–35	57–33	50–39	

Source: https://britishspeedway.co.uk/2026-premiership-table-fixtures-results/
Legend: Blue = home team win; Yellow = draw; Red = away team win.

=== Play Offs ===
**Semi Finals**
1	**Belle Vue Aces**	52	**58**	110
4	Ipswich Witches	**38**	32	70
3	**Sheffield Tigers**	**57**	33	90+6
2	Leicester Lions	33	**57**	90+3

**Grand Final**
**Belle Vue Aces**	47	**53**	100
Sheffield Tigers	**43**	37	80

Home team scores are in bold
Overall aggregate scores are in red

=== Final ===
First Leg

12 October

Sheffield Tigers; Max Fricke (guest) 11; Jye Etheridge 9 Chris Holder 6 Anders Rowe 6 Leon Flint 5 Josh Pickering 5 Luke Killeen 1	43–47	Belle Vue Aces; Brady Kurtz 14; Jason Doyle 12; Zach Cook 9 Tate Zischke 7 Norick Blödorn 3 William Cairns 2 Mitch McDiarmid (guest) 0	Owlerton Stadium; Referee(s): Wayne Jarvis

Second Leg

16 October

Belle Vue Aces; Nicolai Klindt (guest) 11; Jason Doyle 11; Norick Blödorn 10; Zach Cook 10; Brady Kurtz 8 Tate Zischke 3 William Cairns 0	53–37	Sheffield Tigers; Josh Pickering 8 Luke Killeen 7 Max Fricke (guest) 6 Chris Holder 6 Anders Rowe 5 Jye Etheridge 3 Leon Flint 2	National Speedway Stadium; Referee(s): Craig Ackroyd

== Knockout Cup ==
The 2026 Knockout Cup was the 81st edition of the Knockout Cup for tier one teams.

=== Group stage ===
Northern Group

Fixtures

Home \ Away	BEL	LEI	SHF
Belle Vue		57–33	48–42
Leicester	50–40		46–44
Sheffield	56–34	41–49	

Updated to match(es) played on unknown. Source:
Legend: Blue = home team win; Yellow = draw; Red = away team win.

Table

Pos.	Club	M	Home			Away			F	A	B	Pts	+/−
Pos.	Club	M	W	D	L	W	D	L	F	A	B	Pts	+/−
1	Leicester Lions (Q)	4	2	0	0	1	0	1	178	182	1	7	-4
2	Belle Vue Aces	4	2	0	0	0	0	2	179	181	1	5	-2
3	Sheffield Tigers	4	1	0	1	0	0	2	183	177	1	3	+6

Southern Group

Fixtures

Home \ Away	IPS	KLN	NOR
Ipswich		50–40	47–43
Kings Lynn	43–47		50–40
Northampton	41–49	41–47	

Updated to match(es) played on unknown. Source:
Legend: Blue = home team win; Yellow = draw; Red = away team win.

Table

Pos.	Club	M	Home			Away			F	A	B	Pts	+/−
Pos.	Club	M	W	D	L	W	D	L	F	A	B	Pts	+/−
1	Ipswich Witches (Q)	4	2	0	0	2	0	0	193	167	2	10	+26
2	King's Lynn Stars	4	1	0	1	1	0	1	180	178	1	5	+2
3	Northampton Foxes	4	0	0	2	0	0	2	165	193	0	0	-28

=== Final ===
First Leg

27 July

Ipswich Witches; Danny King 12; Richard Lawson 8 Tobiasz Musielak 8 Scott Nicholls 6 Jason Edwards 5 Tom Brennan 4 Kevin Juhl Pedersen 2	45–45	Leicester Lions; Drew Kemp 15; Ryan Douglas 10; Sam Masters 6 Dan Thompson 6 Nick Morris 3 Kyle Howarth 3 Joe Thompson 2	Foxhall Stadium; Referee(s): Michael Breckon

Second Leg

30 July

Leicester Lions; Ryan Douglas 12; Drew Kemp 10; Nick Morris 8 Dan Thompson 7 Joe Thompson; Sam Masters 6 Kyle Howarth r/r	50–40	Ipswich Witches; Tobiasz Musielak 13; Richard Lawson 7 Kevin Juhl Pedersen 6 Danny King 5 Scott Nicholls 5 Tom Brennan 3 Jason Edwards 1	Beaumont Park; Referee(s): Simon Humphrey-Kennett

== Leading averages ==
	Rider	Team	Average
1	(England) Dan Bewley	Belle Vue	10.70
2	(Australia) Jason Doyle	Belle Vue	10.00
3	(Australia) Brady Kurtz	Belle Vue	9.66
4	(Australia) Ryan Douglas	Leicester	9.06
5	(Australia) Jack Holder	Sheffield	9.00
6	(Australia) Max Fricke	King's Lynn	8.71
7	(Australia) Josh Pickering	Sheffield	8.49
8	(Poland) Tobiasz Musielak	Ipswich	8.41
9	(England) Danny King	Ipswich	8.37
10	(Australia) Chris Holder	Sheffield	8.03

- averages include league, play offs & knockout cup, min 6 matches

== Squads ==
Averages include 2026 Premiership and Knockout Cup matches.

Belle Vue Aces

- (England) Dan Bewley 10.70
- (Australia) Jason Doyle 10.00
- (Australia) Brady Kurtz (C) 9.66
- (Australia) Zach Cook 7.42
- (Germany) Norick Blödorn 7.12
- (Denmark) Peter Kildemand 6.73
- (Australia) Tate Zischke 6.34
- (England) Will Cairns (RS) 4.34

Ipswich Witches

- (Poland) Tobiasz Musielak 8.41
- (England) Danny King (C) 8.37
- (England) Richard Lawson 6.89
- (England) Tom Brennan 6.61
- (England) Scott Nicholls 6.13
- (England) Jason Edwards (RS) 4.60
- (Sweden) Philip Hellström Bängs 3.85
- (Denmark) Kevin Juhl Pedersen 3.32

King's Lynn Stars

- (Australia) Max Fricke 8.71
- (England) Chris Harris (C) 7.77
- (Australia) Ben Cook 7.34
- (Czech Republic) Jan Kvěch 7.25
- (England) Cooper Rushen 5.60
- (England) Jordan Jenkins 4.67
- (England) Jody Scott (RS) 4.05
- (Italy) Michele Paco Castagna 3.36

Leicester Lions

- (Australia) Ryan Douglas 9.06
- (England) Dan Thompson 7.12
- (Australia) Nick Morris 6.79
- (Australia) Sam Masters (C) 6.65
- (England) Kyle Howarth 6.39
- (England) Drew Kemp 6.12
- (England) Joe Thompson 5.59
- (England) Dan Gilkes (RS) 0.57

Northampton Foxes

- (Denmark) Niels-Kristian Iversen 7.56
- (England) Adam Ellis 7.31
- (Australia) Kye Thomson 7.06
- (Australia) Jaimon Lidsey 6.87
- (Denmark) Jonas Jeppesen 6.11
- (Denmark) Nicolai Klindt (C) 5.67
- (Slovenia) Matej Zagar 5.56
- (Australia) Troy Batchelor 5.16
- (Australia) Mitchell McDiarmid 4.29
- (England) Luke Harrison (RS) 4.21

Sheffield Tigers

- (Australia) Jack Holder 9.00
- (Australia) Josh Pickering (C) 8.49
- (Australia) Chris Holder 8.03
- (England) Anders Rowe 6.70
- (England) Leon Flint 6.61
- (Australia) Jye Etheridge 4.65
- (Australia) Luke Killeen (RS) 4.04
- (RS) denotes Rising Star
- (C) denotes team captain

== See also ==
- 2026 SGB Championship
- 2026 National Development League speedway season
- British Speedway League Champions
