= 2017 British Speedway Championship =

The 2017 British Speedway Championship was the 57th edition of the British Speedway Championship. Danny King was the defending champion having won the title in 2016. The competition consisted of two semi-finals and a final, with eight riders qualifying from each semi-final. The final took place at the National Speedway Stadium in Belle Vue, Manchester on 19 June 2017 and was won by Craig Cook. It was Cook's first national title, having finished second in the three previous years. He dominated the final, scoring 14 points, before beating Steve Worrall, Ben Barker and Australian Rory Schlein in the deciding race. Schlein was competing in the event on a British racing licence.

== Results ==
=== Semi-Final 1 ===
- (England) Newcastle
- 30 April 2017

Pos.	Rider	Points	Details
1	Rory Schlein ( (Australia) )	13	(3,3,1,3,3)
2	Richie Worrall	13	(3,2,3,3,2)
3	Jason Garrity	11	(2,3,3,1,2)
4	Danny King	11	(2,2,3,1,3)
5	Lewis Rose	11	(3,1,2,2,3)
6	Steve Worrall	10	(3,2,1,3,1)
7	Paul Starke	10	(2,3,1,3,1)
8	Richard Lawson	9+3	(E,1,2,3,3)
9	Ben Barker	9+2	(2,3,2,1,1)
10	Kyle Newman	7	(1,1,2,2,1)
11	James Sarjeant	6	(1,0,3,0,2)
12	Joe Jacobs	3	(1,2,F,R,0)
13	Max Clegg	3	(1,0,1,1,0)
14	Ashley Morris	2	(0,0,0,2,F)
15	Danny Phillips	1	(0,1,0,0,F)
16	Josh Embleton	0	(-,0,0,0,0)
	Robert Lambert	DNS	

=== Semi-Final 2 ===
- (England) Sheffield
- 4 May 2017

Pos.	Rider	Points	Details
1	Kyle Howarth	12	(3,3,2,2,2)
2	Scott Nicholls	11	(3,2,3,3,R)
3	Craig Cook	10	(3,3,1,3,X)
4	Josh Auty	10	(0,2,2,3,3)
5	Lewis Kerr	10	(2,3,1,3,1)
6	Chris Harris	10	(1,2,3,1,3)
7	Lewis Bridger	9+3	(3,X,1,2,3)
8	Stuart Robson	9+2	(2,2,2,1,2)
9	Carl Wilkinson	9+X	(2,1,2,2,2)
10	Edward Kennett	8	(1,1,3,0,3)
11	Stefan Nielsen	7	(1,3,3,0,F)
12	Simon Lambert	5	(1,1,0,2,1)
13	Josh Bates	5	(2,F,1,1,1)
14	Robert Branford	3	(0,1,0,1,1)
15	Adam Roynon	2	(F,R,R,R,2)
16	Jack Parkinson-Blackburn	0	(-,0,R,-,R)
17	Joe Lawlor	0	(-,0,-,R,R)
18	Adam Ellis	0	(X,-,-,-,-)

=== The Final ===
- (England) National Speedway Stadium, Manchester
- 19 June 2017

Placing	Rider	Total	1	2	3	4	5	6	7	8	9	10	11	12	13	14	15	16	17	18	19	20	Pts	Pos	21	22
1	(14) Craig Cook	14				3		3					3		2							3	14	1		3
2	(9) Steve Worrall	11			2		3						0					3		3			11	2		2
3	(16) Rory Schlein ( (Australia) )	10				0				3	3						3			1			10	4	2	1
4	(3) Ben Barker	11	3						1				2				2				3		11	3	3	0
5	(15) Scott Nicholls	10				2			3			2						2	1				10	6	1	
6	(2) Danny King	10	2					0				3				3				2			10	5	0	
7	(8) Chris Harris	9		2						2			1			1			3				9	7		
8	(13) Richie Worrall	9				1	2							3		2					1		9	8		
9	(10) Richard Lawson	9			3			2						1			1		2				9	9		
10	(11) Paul Starke	6			1				2		1					0						2	6	10		
11	(7) Lewis Kerr	5		0					0					2	3					0			5	11		
12	(5) Lewis Rose	5		3			1					0					0					1	5	12		
13	(12) Stuart Robson	4			0					0		1			1						2		4	13		
14	(6) Kyle Howarth	4		1				1			2							0			0		4	14		
15	(4) Jason Garrity	3	1							1				0				1				-	3	15		
16	(1) Carl Wilkinson	0	0				0				0				0				0				0	16		
17	(17) Jack Smith	0																					0	17		
18	(18) Andy Mellish	0																					0	18		
Placing	Rider	Total	1	2	3	4	5	6	7	8	9	10	11	12	13	14	15	16	17	18	19	20	Pts	Pos	21	22

m - exclusion for exceeding two minute time allowance • t - exclusion for touching the tapes • x - other exclusion • e - retired or mechanical failure • f - fell • ns - non-starter • nc - non-classify

gate A - inside	gate B	gate C	gate D - outside

=== Under 21 final ===
Robert Lambert won the British Speedway Under 21 Championship for the first time. The final was held at Wimborne Road on 26 April.

Pos.	Rider	Points
1	Robert Lambert	15
2	Adam Ellis	14
3	Ellis Perks	12
4	Dan Bewley	10
5	Josh Bates	10
6	Nathan Greaves	9
7	Liam Carr	9
8	Zach Wajtknecht	7
9	James Shanes	7
10	Connor Mountain	6
11	Max Clegg	6
12	Jack Smith	5
13	Danny Phillips	4
14	Luke Harris	3
15	Josh Bailey	1
16	Danno Verge (res)	1
17	Alfie Bowtell (res)	1
18	Danyon Hume	0
