= 2026 SGP2 =

World speedway event

World Under 21 Championship

The 2026 SGP2 series was the 50th edition of the FIM Individual Under-21 World Championship.

Three qualifying rounds were staged in Fjelsted, Pardubice and Krško on the 27 June 2026, with the top four progressing to the main SGP series. They will be joined at each round by Rasmus Karlsson, Sven Cerjak and Slater Lightcap, who were named as the three series wildcards.

The series was held over three rounds held in Malilla, Łódź and Vojens from 10 July to 11 September.

The competition was won by Denmark's Mikkel Andersen, who claimed the title by four points from compatriot Nicolai Heiselberg. Former champion Wiktor Przyjemski took the final spot on the podium despite missing a round.

== Qualifying ==
The 2026 season consisted of three qualifying events.

QR1 Fjelsted
| Pos | Rider | Pts |
|---|---|---|
| 1 | (Denmark) Mikkel Andersen | 14+3 |
| 2 | (Poland) Kevin Małkiewicz | 14+2 |
| 3 | (Poland) Antoni Mencel | 12 |
| 4 | (Denmark) Nicolai Heiselberg | 11 |
| 5 | (Germany) Janek Konzack | 9 |
| 6 | (United States) Slater Lightcap | 9 |
| 7 | (Australia) Luke Killeen | 9 |
| 8 | (Australia) Tate Zischke | 8 |
| 9 | (Sweden) Leo Klasson | 8 |
| 10 | (Australia) Erik Persson | 7 |
| 11 | (England) Luke Harrison | 4 |
| 12 | (France) Matys Sambarrey | 4 |
| 13 | (Finland) Otto Raak | 3 |
| 14 | (Latvia) Damirs Filimonovs | 3 |
| 15 | (Germany) Tim Widera | 2 |
| 16 | (Denmark) Nicolas Hohlbein | 2 |
| 17 | (Denmark) Bastian Pedersen (res) | 1 |

QR2 Pardubice
| Pos | Rider | Pts |
|---|---|---|
| 1 | (Poland) Wiktor Przyjemski | 15 |
| 2 | (Denmark) William Drejer | 12+3 |
| 3 | (Czech Republic) Adam Bednář | 12+2 |
| 4 | (Australia) Mitchell McDiarmid | 12+1 |
| 5 | (Sweden) Rasmus Karlsson | 11 |
| 6 | (Ukraine) Nazar Parnitskyi | 11 |
| 7 | (Germany) Patrick Hyjek | 9 |
| 8 | (Australia) James Pearson | 8 |
| 9 | (Czech Republic) Adam Nejezchleba | 7 |
| 10 | (Scotland) Ace Pijper | 6 |
| 11 | (France) Tino Bouin | 5 |
| 12 | (England) Max Perry | 5 |
| 13 | (Germany) Mika Frehse | 3 |
| 14 | (United States) Wilbur Hancock | 2 |
| 15 | (Sweden) Alfons Wiltander | 2 |
| 16 | (Czech Republic) Jan Hlacina | 0 |

QR3 Krško
| Pos | Rider | Pts |
|---|---|---|
| 1 | (Poland) Maksymilian Pawełczak | 14+3 |
| 2 | (Denmark) Villads Nagel | 14+2 |
| 3 | (England) William Cairns | 14+1 |
| 4 | (Australia) Beau Bailey | 11 |
| 5 | (Slovenia) Sven Cerjak | 10 |
| 6 | (Germany) Mario Häusl | 8 |
| 7 | (Poland) Bartosz Bańbor | 8 |
| 8 | (Ukraine) Roman Kapustin | 7 |
| 9 | (Denmark) Niklas Holm Jakobsen | 7 |
| 10 | (Slovenia) Gregor Zorko | 7 |
| 11 | (Hungary) Zoltán Lovas | 6 |
| 12 | (Sweden) Sammy Van Dyck | 5 |
| 13 | (Ukraine) Makar Levishyn | 3 |
| 14 | (Czech Republic) Jaroslav Vaníček | 2 |
| 15 | (Czech Republic) Jan Jeníček | 2 |
| 16 | (Italy) Kevin Melato | 1 |

== Main event ==
The 2026 season consists of three rounds.

| Round | Date | Venue | Winner |
|---|---|---|---|
| 1 | 10 July | (Sweden) Skrotfrag Arena, Målilla | (Poland) Wiktor Przyjemski |
| 2 | 31 July | (Poland) Moto Arena, Łódź | (Denmark) Mikkel Andersen |
| 3 | 11 September | (Denmark) Vojens Speedway Center, Vojens | (Denmark) Nicolai Heiselberg |

== Final Classification ==
| Pos. | Rider | Points | (Sweden) | (Poland) | (Denmark) |
| Gold | (Denmark) (97) Mikkel Andersen | 46 | 18 | 20 | 8 |
| Silver | (Denmark) (63) Nicolai Heiselberg | 42 | 6 | 16 | 20 |
| Bronze | (Poland) (505) Wiktor Przyjemski | 38 | 20 | – | 18 |
| 4 | (Denmark) (545) William Drejer | 35 | 14 | 9 | 12 |
| 5 | (Australia) (173) Beau Bailey | 34 | 9 | 14 | 11 |
| 6 | (Poland) (121) Maksymilian Pawełczak | 32 | 10 | 18 | 4 |
| 7 | (United States) (28) Slater Lightcap | 30 | 11 | 12 | 7 |
| 8 | (Czech Republic) (79) Adam Bednář | 26 | 0 | 10 | 16 |
| 9 | (Denmark) (108) Villads Nagel | 25 | 16 | 8 | 1 |
| 10 | (Poland) (802) Kevin Małkiewicz | 23 | 12 | 6 | 5 |
| 11 | (England) (145) William Cairns | 22 | 8 | 11 | 3 |
| 12 | (Poland) (305) Antoni Mencel | 19 | 5 | 4 | 10 |
| 13 | (Australia) (27) Mitchell McDiarmid | 18 | 2 | 7 | 9 |
| 14 | (Sweden) (99) Rasmus Karlsson | 18 | 7 | 5 | 6 |
| 15 | (Denmark) (16) Bastian Pedersen | 14 | – | – | 14 |
| 16 | (Slovenia) (138) Sven Cerjak | 6 | 4 | 0 | 2 |
| 17 | (Sweden) (16) Leo Klasson | 3 | 3 | – | – |
| 18 | (Germany) (911) Janek Konzack | 3 | – | 3 | – |
| 19 | (Poland) (17) Kacper Halkiewicz | 2 | – | 2 | – |
| 20 | (Sweden) (17) Alfons Wiltander | 1 | 1 | – | – |
| 21 | (Poland) (16) Antoni Kawczyński | 1 | – | 1 | – |
| 22 | (Sweden) (18) Harry Lundahl | 0 | 0 | – | – |
| 23 | (Poland) (18) Radosław Kowalski | 0 | – | 0 | – |
| 24 | (Denmark) (17) Dimitri Buch | 0 | – | – | 0 |
| 25 | (Denmark) (18) Patrick Kruse | 0 | – | – | 0 |

== See also ==
- 2026 Speedway Grand Prix
