= 2016 British Speedway Championship =

Seasons
- ← 2015 2017 →

The 2016 British Speedway Championship is the 56th edition of the British Speedway Championship. Tai Woffinden was the three-time defending champion having won the title in 2013, 2014 and 2015, however decided against competing in the 2016 event. The competition consisted of two semi-finals and a final. Seven riders qualified from each semi-final and were joined by two nominated wildcards in the decider. The final took place at the National Speedway Stadium in Belle Vue, Manchester on 13 June 2016, and was won by Danny King, his first title. He beat Craig Cook, who finished second for the third straight year, Robert Lambert and Steve Worrall in the final.

== Results ==
=== Semi-Final 1 ===
- (England) Scunthorpe
- 13 May 2016

Pos.	Rider	Points	Details
1	Simon Stead	13	(3,3,2,3,2)
2	Josh Auty	12	(3,2,3,2,2)
3	Kyle Howarth	11	(3,3,2,X,3)
4	Jason Garrity	11	(2,2,3,3,1)
5	Chris Harris	11	(2,3,3,1,2)
6	Robert Lambert	10	(0,2,3,2,3)
7	Richard Hall	9	(3,3,0,1,2)
8	Josh Bates	9	(2,1,1,2,3)
9	Lewis Kerr	7	(1,0,2,3,1)
10	Carl Wilkinson	7	(1,1,2,3,0)
11	Leigh Lanham	5	(0,0,0,2,3)
12	Simon Lambert	5	(1,2,1,0,1)
13	Edward Kennett	4	(2,1,1,R,0)
14	Stuart Robson	4	(1,1,1,1,0)
15	Robert Mear	2	(0,0,0,1,1)
16	Ashley Morris	0	(0,0,0,0,0)
	Danny Phillips	DNS	

=== Semi-Final 2 ===
- (Scotland) Glasgow
- 15 May 2016

Pos.	Rider	Points	Details
1	Richard Lawson	13	(3,3,3,3,1)
2	Scott Nicholls	13	(3,2,3,3,2)
3	Steve Worrall	12	(F,3,3,3,3)
4	Richie Worrall	12	(3,3,1,2,3)
5	Paul Starke	12	(2,3,2,2,3)
6	Craig Cook	10	(3,R,2,3,2)
7	Ben Barker	8	(2,1,2,2,1)
8	Charles Wright	7+3	(2,2,2,1,0)
9	Danny Ayres	7+2	(X,1,3,1,2)
10	James Sarjeant	5	(2,2,1,F,0)
11	Lewis Rose	5	(1,1,0,1,2)
12	Joe Jacobs	4	(1,0,0,0,3)
13	Stefan Nielsen	4	(1,2,0,0,1)
14	Adam Roynon	4	(R,0,1,2,1)
15	Robert Branford	2	(0,0,1,1,0)
16	Rob Shuttleworth	2	(1,1,0,0,0)
17	Ryan MacDonald	0	(R,-,-,-,-,-)
	Blair Smith	DNS	

=== The Final ===
- (England) National Speedway Stadium, Manchester
- 13 June 2016

Placing	Rider	Total	1	2	3	4	5	6	7	8	9	10	11	12	13	14	15	16	17	18	19	20	Pts	Pos	21	22
1	(4) Danny King	13	2							3				3				2				3	13	1		3
2	(3) Craig Cook	12	0						3				3				3				3		12	2		2
3	(12) Robert Lambert	12			2					2		3			3						2		12	3	3	1
4	(2) Steve Worrall	10	3					1				1				2				3			10	4	2	0
5	(8) Richard Lawson	10		1						1			2			3			3				10	5	1	
6	(9) Scott Nicholls	10			1		3						1					3		2			10	6	0	
7	(10) Paul Starke	10			3			2						1			2		2				10	7		
8	(5) Josh Auty	8		3			1					2					1					1	8	8		
9	(14) Richie Worrall	7				2		3					0		2							0	7	9		
10	(6) Simon Stead	6		2				0			3							1			0		6	10		
11	(15) Jason Garrity	5				3			2			0						0	-				5	11		
12	(13) Chris Harris	5				0	2							2		0					1		5	12		
13	(16) Kyle Howarth	4				1				0	2						0			1			4	13		
14	(11) Richard Hall	3			0				0		0					1						2	3	14		
15	(7) Ben Barker	2		0					1					0	1					0			2	15		
16	(1) Josh Bates	2	1				0				1				0				0				2	16		
17	(17) Charles Wright	1																					1	17		
Placing	Rider	Total	1	2	3	4	5	6	7	8	9	10	11	12	13	14	15	16	17	18	19	20	Pts	Pos	21	22

m - exclusion for exceeding two minute time allowance • t - exclusion for touching the tapes • x - other exclusion • e - retired or mechanical failure • f - fell • ns - non-starter • nc - non-classify

gate A - inside	gate B	gate C	gate D - outside

=== Under 21 final ===
Josh Bates won the British Speedway Under 21 Championship for the second time. The final was held at Owlerton Stadium on 14 April.

Pos.	Rider	Points	SF	Final
1	Josh Bates	11	3	3
2	Robert Lambert	15	x	2
3	Adam Ellis	13	x	1
4	Jack Parkinson-Blackburn	11	2	0
5	Nathan Greaves	9	1	
6	Max Clegg	11	0	
7	Zach Wajtknecht	9		
8	Oliver Greenwood	8		
9	James Shanes	7		
10	Jack Smith	6		
11	Danyon Hume	5		
12	Ellis Perks	4		
13	Danny Phillips	4		
14	Josh Bailey	3		
15	Danno Verge (res)	2		
16	Alfie Bowtell	1		
17	Liam Carr (res)	1		
18	Ben Basford (res)	0		
