= 2015 British Speedway Championship =

Seasons
- ← 2014 2016 →

The 2015 British Speedway Championship is the 55th edition of the British Speedway Championship. Tai Woffinden was the defending champion having won the title in 2013 and 2014. The competition consisted of two semi-finals and a final. Seven riders qualified from each semi-final and were joined by two nominated wildcards in the decider. The final took place in Wolverhampton on 15 June 2015 and was won by Woffinden. It was his third straight success, equalling the feat achieved by Andy Smith between 1993 and 1995. Craig Cook was second for the second year in a row, earning himself the wildcard place in the 2015 Speedway Grand Prix of Great Britain as a result. Cook had initially led the final, but Jason Garrity fell and a re-run was then required, which Woffinden won. Danny King took third place overall.

== Results ==
=== Semi-final 1 ===
- Sheffield
- 7 May 2015

Pos.	Rider	Points	Details
1	Chris Harris	14	(3,2,3,3,3)
2	Ben Barker	13	(3,3,2,3,2)
3	Andre Compton	12	(2,3,3,2,2)
4	Edward Kennett	11	(3,3,1,3,1)
5	Lewis Blackbird	10	(2,0,3,2,3)
6	Josh Auty	10	(2,2,2,2,2)
7	Richard Lawson	9	(3,1,2,0,3)
8	Jason Garrity	9	(1,1,1,3,3)
9	Richie Worrall	7	(2,3,D,1,1)
10	Paul Starke	7	(1,2,1,2,1)
11	Ashley Birks	6	(1,2,0,1,2)
12	Adam Ellis	4	(0,0,3,1,0)
13	Ritchie Hawkins	3	(0,1,2,0,0)
14	Luke Bowen	2	(1,0,0,0,1)
15	Stuart Robson	2	(0,1,D,1,0)
16	Ashley Morris	1	(U,D,1,0,0)

=== Semi-final 2 ===
- King's Lynn
- 20 May 2015

Pos.	Rider	Points	Details
1	Scott Nicholls	11	(2,3,3,3,0)
2	Danny King	11	(3,3,0,3,2)
3	Leigh Lanham	11	(R,3,3,2,3)
4	Craig Cook	11	(3,2,3,1,2)
5	Kyle Howarth	11	(3,2,2,3,1)
6	Tai Woffinden	10	(2,3,2,3,F)
7	Carl Wilkinson	9	(1,0,3,2,3)
8	Adam Roynon	9	(1,2,1,2,3)
9	Charles Wright	8	(3,1,2,0,2)
10	Steve Worrall	8	(2,1,1,1,3)
11	Stefan Nielsen	7	(1,2,2,1,1)
12	Simon Lambert	5	(1,1,0,1,2)
13	Kyle Newman	4	(0,0,1,2,1)
14	Robert Lambert	2	(2,F,-,-,-)
15	Lewis Rose	2	(0,1,1,0,0)
16	Scott Campos	1	(-,-,0,0,1)
17	James Wright	0	(0,0,X,-,-)
18	Ryan Kinsley	0	(-,-,-,0,0)

=== The final ===
- Monmore Green Stadium, Wolverhampton
- 15 June 2015

Placing	Rider	Total	1	2	3	4	5	6	7	8	9	10	11	12	13	14	15	16	17	18	19	20	Pts	Pos	21	22
1	(9) Tai Woffinden	13			1		3						3					3		3			13	1		3
2	(5) Craig Cook	12		3			0					3					3					3	12	3	3	2
3	(14) Danny King	9				3		0					2		3							1	9	6	2	1
4	(11) Jason Garrity	13			3				3		3					2						2	13	2		0
5	(8) Scott Nicholls	10		2						3			1			1			3				10	5	1	
6	(13) Richard Lawson	11				1	2							2		3					3		11	4	0	
7	(10) Chris Harris	9			2			0						3			2		2				9	7		
8	(6) Kyle Howarth	8		1				3			2							0			2		8	8		
9	(1) Carl Wilkinson	7	3				1				1				1				1				7	9		
10	(15) Edward Kennett	7				2			2			2						1	0				7	10		
11	(12) Lewis Blackbird	6			0					2		1			2						1		6	11		
12	(4) Steve Worrall	6	2							1				1				2				0	6	12		
13	(7) Adam Roynon	3		0					1					0	0					2			3	13		
14	(2) Andre Compton	3	1					2				0				0				0			3	14		
15	(16) Leigh Lanham	2				0				0	0						1			1			2	15		
16	(3) Ben Barker	0	0						-				-				-				-		0	16		
17	(17) Max Clegg	0																					0	17		
18	(18) Matt Williamson	0																					0	18		
Placing	Rider	Total	1	2	3	4	5	6	7	8	9	10	11	12	13	14	15	16	17	18	19	20	Pts	Pos	21	22

m - exclusion for exceeding two minute time allowance • t - exclusion for touching the tapes • x - other exclusion • e - retired or mechanical failure • f - fell • ns - non-starter • nc - non-classify

gate A - inside	gate B	gate C	gate D - outside

=== Under-21 final ===
Kyle Howarth won the British Speedway Under 21 Championship. The final was held at Brandon Stadium on 14 April.

Pos.	Rider	Points	SF	Final
1	Kyle Howarth	14	x	3
2	Robert Lambert	15	x	2
3	Stefan Nielsen	11	2	1
4	Ashley Morris	12	3	0
5	James Shanes	9	1	
6	Max Clegg	12	0	
7	Josh Bates	8		
8	Ben Morley	7		
9	Marc Owen	7		
10	Oliver Greenwood	6		
11	Connor Coles	5		
12	Tom Stokes	5		
13	Connor Mountain	4		
14	Josh Bailey	2		
15	Danny Phillips	2		
16	Ryan Terry-Daley	1		
17	Danno Verge (res)	0		
