= 2025 Speedway of Nations 2 =

Motorcycle racing competition

- Venue: MotoArena
- Location: Toruń, Poland
- Start date: 3 October 2025
- End date: 3 October 2025

The 2025 Speedway of Nations 2 (SON2) was the 21st Team Under-21 World Championship season, organised by the FIM. The event took place on 3 October 2025 at the MotoArena in Toruń, Poland.

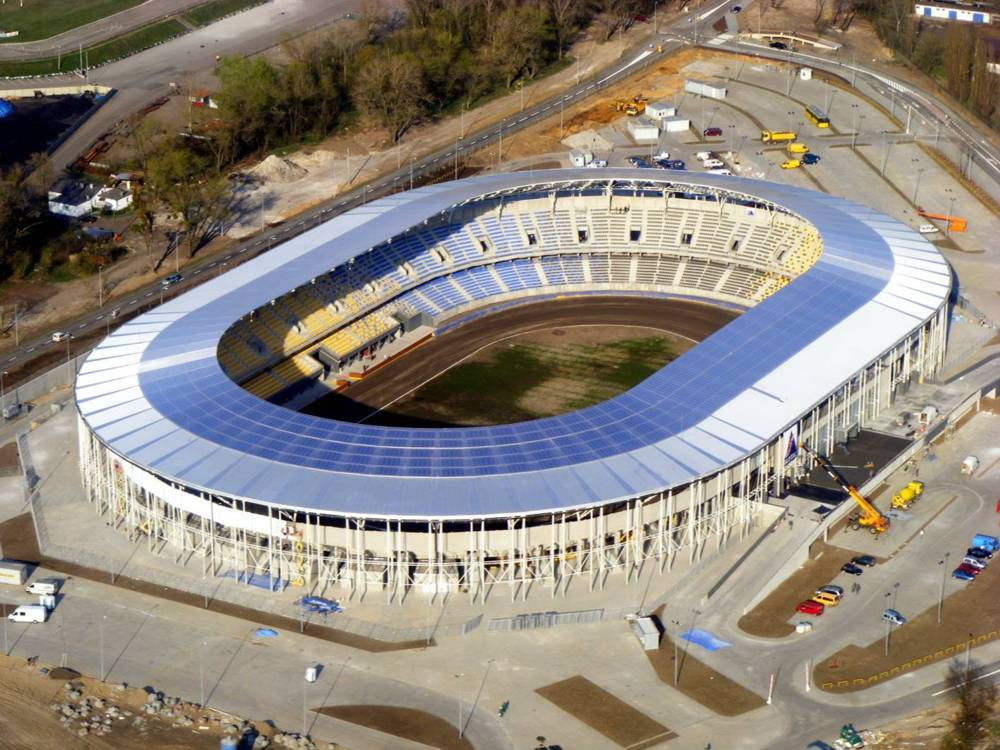
MotoArena stadium, Toruń, BiT City, Kuyavian–Pomeranian, northern Poland

Poland were the defending champions having won the 2024 Speedway of Nations 2.

== Summary ==
Germany won the title, with riders Norick Blödorn and Mario Häusl scoring 39 points. It was the first time Germany had won the Speedway of Nations 2/Speedway Under-21 World Championship. Denmark finished second, scoring 38 points, with Australia taking the final spot on the podium. Hosts Poland finished fourth, despite 16-year-old Maksymilian Pawełczak scoring 24 points.

== Final ==
- MotoArena, Toruń, Poland
- 3 October

Pos	Nation	Riders	Pts
1	Germany	Norick Blödorn (C) 24, Mario Häusl 15, Hannah Grunwald DNR	39
2	Denmark	Mikkel Andersen 21, Villads Nagel 13, Bastian Pedersen (C) 4	38
3	Australia	Mitchell McDiarmid 19, Tate Zischke 18, James Pearson (C) 0	37
4	Poland	Maksymilian Pawełczak 24, Antoni Kawczyński 9, Damian Ratajczak (C) 2	35
5	Czech Republic	Adam Bednar (C) 27, Jan Jeníček 4, Jaroslav Vaníček 0	31
6	Sweden	Casper Henriksson (C) 15, Rasmus Karlsson 7, Erik Persson 6	28
7	Great Britain	Dan Thompson (C) 23, Luke Harrison 3, Luke Killeen 0	26
8	Latvia	Nikita Kaulins (C) 11, Artjoms Juhno 7, Damir Filimonovs 0	18

== See also ==
- 2025 SGP2
- 2025 Speedway of Nations
