= 2014 British Speedway Championship =

Seasons
- ← 2013 2015 →

The 2014 British Speedway Championship was the 54th edition of the British Speedway Championship. The Final took place on 16 June at Monmore Green in Wolverhampton, England. The Championship was won by the defending champion Tai Woffinden, who beat Craig Cook, Ben Barker and Chris Harris in the final heat. It was the second time Woffinden had won the title.

== Results ==
=== Semi-Final 1 ===
- (England) Sheffield
- 24 April 2014

Pos.	Rider	Points	Details
1	Daniel King	14	(3,3,3,2,3)
2	Craig Cook	13	(2,3,3,3,2)
3	Ben Barker	13	(3,3,3,2,2)
4	Scott Nicholls	12	(2,2,2,3,3)
5	Simon Stead	10	(3,3,R,1,3)
6	Chris Harris	8	(3,1,X,1,3)
7	Adam Roynon	8	(2,2,2,1,1)
8	Edward Kennett	7	(R,1,1,3,2)
9	Ashley Morris	6	(1,R,0,3,2)
10	Lewis Kerr	5	(0,0,3,2,0)
11	Charles Wright*	5	(2,R,0,2,1)
12	Derek Sneddon	4	(1,1,2,0,0)
13	Andre Compton	4	(1,1,T,1,1)
14	Kyle Howarth	4	(0,2,1,0,-)
15	Stuart Robson	3	(1,2,F,R,-)
16	James Sarjeant	3	(-,-,2,-,1)
17	Josh Bates	1	(R,0,1,0,0)
18	Nathan Greaves	0	(-,-,-,-,0)

- Charles Wright replaced Adam Roynon in the final.

=== Semi-Final 2 ===
- (England) Rye House
- 30 April 2014

Pos.	Rider	Points	Details
1	Tai Woffinden	15	(3,3,3,3,3)
2	Steve Boxall	11	(3,1,1,3,3)
3	Lewis Blackbird	11	(2,1,3,3,2)
4	Lewis Bridger	11	(1,3,2,2,3)
5	Richard Lawson	11	(3,2,1,2,3)
6	Richie Worrall	10	(2,3,2,1,2)
7	Jason Garrity	9	(2,0,3,2,2)
8	Leigh Lanham	8	(3,0,2,3,0)
9	Stefan Nielsen	8	(1,2,2,1,2)
10	Ritchie Hawkins	6	(0,2,3,0,1)
11	Joe Jacobs	5	(0,3,0,2,X)
12	Carl Wilkinson	5	(1,2,1,0,1)
13	Luke Bowen	5	(2,X,1,1,1)
14	Josh Auty	4	(1,1,X,1,1)
15	Ashley Birks	1	(F,1,0,T,E)
16	Ben Morley	0	(-,-,0,0,0)
17	Oliver Allen	0	(0,F,E,-,-)

=== The Final ===
- (England) Monmore Green Stadium, Wolverhampton
- 16 June 2014

Placing	Rider	Total	1	2	3	4	5	6	7	8	9	10	11	12	13	14	15	16	17	18	19	20	Pts	Pos	21	22
1	(8) Tai Woffinden	12		3						1			3			2			3				12	3	3	3
2	(15) Craig Cook	13				3			3			2						3	2				13	1		2
3	(3) Ben Barker	13	3						2				2				3				3		13	2		1
4	(12) Chris Harris	9			1					2		3			2						1		9	6	2	0
5	(2) Jason Garrity	9	0					2				1				3				3			9	5	1	
6	(14) Scott Nicholls	12				2		3					1		3							3	12	4	0	
7	(7) Simon Stead	9		2					1					3	1					2			9	7		
8	(6) Daniel King	7		0				0			3							2			2		7	8		
9	(5) Charles Wright	7		1			3					0					2					1	7	9		
10	(4) Richie Worrall	7	2							3				1				1				0	7	10		
11	(11) Richard Lawson	6			2				0		2					0						2	6	11		
12	(9) Lewis Bridger	5			3		2						0					0		0			5	12		
13	(10) Lewis Blackbird	4			0			1						2			1		0				4	13		
14	(13) Edward Kennett	3				1	1							0		1					0		3	14		
15	(1) Leigh Lanham	2	1				0				0				0				1				2	15		
16	(16) Steve Boxall	2				0				0	1						0			1			2	16		
	(17) Tom Perry	0																					0			
	(18) Max Clegg	0																					0			
Placing	Rider	Total	1	2	3	4	5	6	7	8	9	10	11	12	13	14	15	16	17	18	19	20	Pts	Pos	21	22

m - exclusion for exceeding two minute time allowance • t - exclusion for touching the tapes • x - other exclusion • e - retired or mechanical failure • f - fell • ns - non-starter • nc - non-classify

gate A - inside	gate B	gate C	gate D - outside

=== Under 21 final ===
Josh Bates won the British Speedway Under 21 Championship. The final was held at Monmore Green Stadium on 15 April.

Pos.	Rider	Points	SF	Final
1	Josh Bates	11	2	3
2	Adam Ellis	13	x	2
3	Jason Garrity	10	3	1
4	Stefan Nielsen	13	x	0
5	Joe Jacobs	12	1	
6	Ashley Morris	11	0	
7	Kyle Howarth	8		
8	Tom Perry	7		
9	James Shanes	7		
10	Marc Owen	6		
11	Dan Greenwood	6		
12	Jack Kingston	5		
13	James Sarjeant	4		
14	Connor Coles	3		
15	Connor Mountain (res)	1		
16	Danny Phillips (res)	1		
17	Ryan Terry-Daley	1		
18	Nathan Greaves	0		
