= 2024 British Speedway Championship =

British motorcycle speedway competition

The 2024 British Speedway Championship (sponsored by Attis Insurance Sports Division) was the 64th edition of the British Speedway Championship. It was won by Dan Bewley.

== Summary ==
The final was held on 8 June at the National Speedway Stadium in Manchester. Dan Bewley won the title, beating Tai Woffinden, Tom Brennan and Chris Harris in the final. It was the third successive time that Bewley had won the title, and was the first time a rider had won three in a row since Woffinden in 2015. Brennan secured a wildcard place at the 2024 British Grand Prix by finishing as the highest placed non-GP rider.

The Under 21 final was held on 2 June at Ashfield Stadium in Glasgow and was won by Sam Hagon. The Under 19 final was held on 6 October at Oxford Stadium in Oxford. It was won by Ace Pijper, who beat Luke Harrison on countback after it was ended after just 16 heats due to bad weather.

== Results ==
=== The final ===
- (England) National Speedway Stadium, Manchester
- 8 June 2024

| Pos. | Rider | Heat scores | Points | SF | Final |
|---|---|---|---|---|---|
| 1 | Dan Bewley | 3,2,3,2,2 | 12 | - | 3 |
| 2 | Tom Brennan | 3,1,3,3,3 | 13 | - | 2 |
| 3 | Tai Woffinden | 3,2,1,3,1 | 10 | 3 | 1 |
| 4 | Chris Harris | 2,1,2,3,2 | 10 | 2 | 0 |
| 5 | Steve Worrall | 2,3,1,2,3 | 11 | 1 | |
| 6 | Adam Ellis | 2,0,3,1,3 | 9 | 0 | |
| 7 | Robert Lambert | 3,0,3,1,2 | 9 | | |
| 8 | Charles Wright | X,3,0,3,2 | 8 | | |
| 9 | Anders Rowe | 1,1,2,0,3 | 7 | | |
| 10 | Kyle Howarth | 2,3,0,1,0 | 6 | | |
| 11 | Craig Cook | 1,3,1,0,1 | 6 | | |
| 12 | Connor Mountain | 0,2,2,2,0 | 6 | | |
| 13 | Jordan Jenkins | 1,1,2,0,1 | 5 | | |
| 14 | Lewis Kerr | 0,2,0,1,1 | 4 | | |
| 15 | Drew Kemp | 1,0,1,2,0 | 4 | | |
| 16 | Simon Lambert | 0,0,0,0,R | 0 | | |

=== Under 21 final ===
- (Scotland) Ashfield Stadium, Glasgow
- 2 June 2024

| Pos. | Rider | Heat scores | Points | SF | Final |
|---|---|---|---|---|---|
| 1 | Sam Hagon | 1,3,3,3,3 | 13 | - | 3 |
| 2 | Leon Flint | 3,3,2,3,3 | 14 | - | 2 |
| 3 | Ashton Boughen | 3,3,1,2,3 | 12 | 3 | 1 |
| 4 | Joe Thompson | 1,3,2,2,2 | 10 | 2 | 0 |
| 5 | Luke Killeen ( (Australia) ) | 2,0,3,3,1 | 9 | 1 | |
| 6 | Vinnie Foord | 3,2,3,1,2 | 11 | 0 | |
| 7 | Nathan Ablitt | 1,1,1,2,3 | 8 | | |
| 8 | Jody Scott | 3,0,2,0,2 | 7 | | |
| 9 | Jake Mulford | 2,2,0,2,1 | 7 | | |
| 10 | Ben Trigger | 2,0,1,3,0 | 6 | | |
| 11 | Ace Pijper | X,1,2,1,2 | 6 | | |
| 12 | Luke Harrison | 1,2,0,1,1 | 5 | | |
| 13 | Freddie Hodder | 0,X,3,0,1 | 4 | | |
| 14 | Dan Thompson | 2,2,-,-,- | 4 | | |
| 15 | Stene Pijper | 0,1,1,1,0 | 3 | | |
| 16 | Mark Parker (res) | -,1,-,0,- | 1 | | |
| 17 | Mickie Simpson | 0,0,0,0,0 | 0 | | |
| 18 | Laylen Richardson (res) | -,-,0,-,0 | 0 | | |

=== Under 19 final ===
- (England) Oxford Stadium, Oxford
- 6 October 2024

| Pos. | Rider | Heat scores | Points |
|---|---|---|---|
| 1 | Ace Pijper | 3,2,3,3 | 11 |
| 2 | Luke Harrison | 2,3,3,3 | 11 |
| 3 | Jody Scott | 3,2,2,3 | 10 |
| 4 | Luke Killeen ( (Australia) ) | 3,2,3,X | 8 |
| 5 | Freddie Hodder | 2,3,1,2 | 8 |
| 6 | Ashton Vale | 2,1,1,3 | 7 |
| 7 | Sonny Springer | 2,1,3,1 | 7 |
| 8 | Max Perry | 1,2,2,2 | 7 |
| 9 | William Cairns | 3,3,0,- | 6 |
| 10 | Vinnie Foord | F,3,2,X | 5 |
| 11 | Senna Summers | 0,1,2,2 | 5 |
| 12 | Stene Pijper | 0,0,1,2 | 3 |
| 13 | Max James | 1,1,1,0 | 3 |
| 14 | Jamie Etherington | 1,0,0,1 | 2 |
| 15 | Harrison Rogers | 1,0,0,1 | 2 |
| 16 | Joe Crewe (res) | -,-,-,1 | 1 |
| 17 | Lee Harrison | 0,0,0,0 | 0 |

Meeting was abandoned after 16 heats due to bad weather. The result stood.
