= British Under-19 Championship =

Annual motorcycle speedway competition

- Category: motorcycle speedway
- Country: United Kingdom
- Inaugural season: 2004

The British Under-19 Championship is an annual motorcycle speedway competition open to British national speedway riders aged nineteen years and under at the start of each year. It replaced the British Under-18 Championship in 2011.

== History ==
From 2004 to 2010, the competition was restricted to the under 18 age bracket.

== Past winners ==
Year	Venue	Winner	Runner-Up	Third	Ref
2004	Monmore Green Stadium	Danny King	James Wright	Edward Kennett	
2005	Monmore Green Stadium	William Lawson	Lewis Bridger	Jack Hargreaves	
2006	Monmore Green Stadium	Lewis Bridger	Tai Woffinden	Ben Barker	
2007	Monmore Green Stadium	Tai Woffinden	Lewis Bridger	Joe Haines	
2008	Eddie Wright Raceway	Tai Woffinden	Josh Auty	Jerran Hart	
2009	Eddie Wright Raceway	Jerran Hart	Kyle Howarth	Kyle Newman	
2010	Oaktree Arena	Brendan Johnson	Joe Jacobs	Kyle Howarth	
2011	Rye House Stadium	Jason Garrity	Shane Hazelden	Ben Morley	
2012	Owlerton Stadium	Stefan Nielsen	Ashley Morris	Joe Jacobs	
2013	Brandon Stadium	Stefan Nielsen	Ashley Morris	Ben Morley	
2014	Central Park Stadium	Oliver Greenwood	Josh Bates	Jack Kingston	
2015	Shielfield Park	Josh Bates	Max Clegg	Ellis Perks	
2016	Perry Barr Stadium	Max Clegg	Ellis Perks	Jack Smith	
2017	Plymouth Coliseum	Zach Wajtknecht	Dan Bewley	Kyle Bickley	
2018	Foxhall Stadium	Dan Bewley	Tom Brennan	Leon Flint	
2019	South Tees Motorsports Park	Drew Kemp	Jason Edwards	Anders Rowe	
2020	Eddie Wright Raceway	Drew Kemp	Dan Gilkes	Jordan Palin	
2021	Eddie Wright Raceway	Drew Kemp	Dan Thompson	Jason Edwards	
2022	South Tees Motorsports Park	Leon Flint	Jake Mulford	Harry McGurk	
2023	Perry Barr Stadium	Dan Thompson	Nathan Ablitt	Joe Thompson	
2024	Oxford Stadium	Ace Pijper	Luke Harrison	Jody Scott	
2025	GT Tyres Arena	Luke Harrison	Jody Scott	Cooper Rushen	

== See also ==
- British Speedway Championship
- British Speedway Under 21 Championship
- Speedway in the United Kingdom
