= Wolverhampton Olympique =

British motorcycle speedway competition

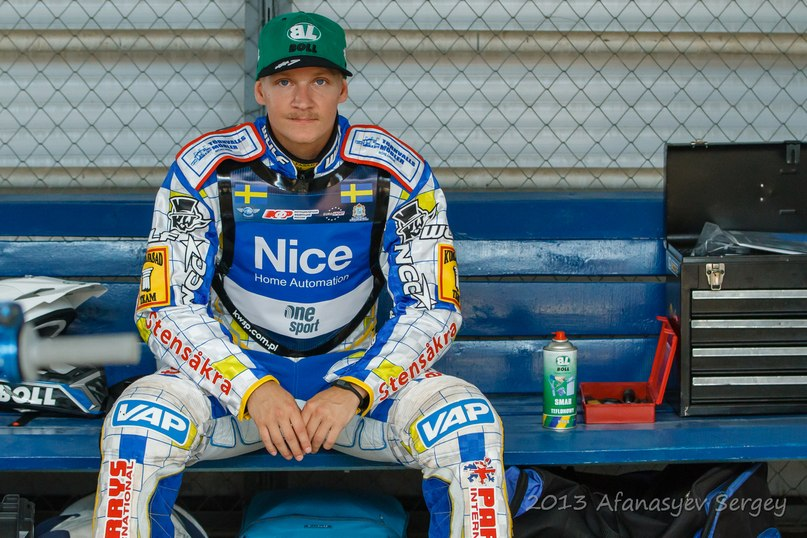
- Freddie Lindgren six time winner
- Category: motorcycle speedway
- Country: United Kingdom
- Inaugural season: 1966
- Folded: 2023

The Wolverhampton Olympique was an individual motorcycle speedway event that was hosted annually in the Midlands.

== History ==
The event was first run in October 1966 by the Newcastle Diamonds club at their home venue Brough Park. At the time both Newcastle Diamonds and Wolverhampton Wolves were owned by the same promoter Mike Parker. In 1969, Parker sold his interest in Newcastle Diamonds and a number of his assets were transferred to Wolverhampton Wolves, two of which were the Olympique event and the licence of speedway rider Ole Olsen.

With the closure of Wolverhampton in 1980 the meeting was transferred to Birmingham but when Wolves re-opened in 1984 Peter Adams brought it back to Monmore Green Stadium in Wolverhampton.

The last Olympique was held in 2023, because Monmore Green's owners Entain announced that the venue would only be used by greyhound racing during 2024. It was won by Australian Zach Cook.

== Past winners ==
Year	Venue	First	Second	Third
1966	Brough Park	(New Zealand) Barry Briggs	(England) Peter Kelly	(England) Nigel Boocock
1967	Brough Park	(Sweden) Anders Michanek	(New Zealand) Ivan Mauger	(England) Nigel Boocock
1968	Brough Park	Not staged		
1969	Brough Park	Not staged		
1970	Monmore Green Stadium	(Denmark) Ole Olsen	(New Zealand) Ivan Mauger	(New Zealand) Ronnie Moore
1971	Monmore Green Stadium	(Denmark) Ole Olsen	(New Zealand) Barry Briggs	(Sweden) Bernt Persson
1972	Monmore Green Stadium	(Denmark) Ole Olsen	(England) Terry Betts	(New Zealand) Ivan Mauger
1973	Monmore Green Stadium	(Denmark) Ole Olsen	(England) Peter Collins	(England) Chris Pusey
1974	Monmore Green Stadium	(Denmark) Ole Olsen	(England) Peter Collins	(New Zealand) Terry Betts
1975	Monmore Green Stadium	(Denmark) Ole Olsen	(Australia) Billy Sanders	(Sweden) Sören Sjösten
1976	Monmore Green Stadium	(England) Peter Collins	(Denmark) Ole Olsen	(England) Chris Morton
1977	Monmore Green Stadium	(Australia) Billy Sanders	(England) Gordon Kennett	(England) Dave Jessup
1978	Monmore Green Stadium	(England) Gordon Kennett	(Denmark) Ole Olsen	(Finland) Ila Teromaa
1979	Monmore Green Stadium	(Australia) Phil Crump	(United States) Bruce Penhall	(Sweden) Jan Andersson
1980	Monmore Green Stadium	(England) Les Collins	(United States) Bobby Schwartz	(Denmark) Tommy Knudsen
1981	Monmore Green Stadium	(New Zealand) Mitch Shirra	(Denmark) Hans Nielsen	(England) Dave Jessup
1982	Monmore Green Stadium	(Denmark) Hans Nielsen	(England) Alan Grahame	(Denmark) Tommy Knudsen
1983	Birchfield Ladbroke Stadium	Not staged		
1984	Monmore Green Stadium	(Denmark) Hans Nielsen	(United States) Shawn Moran	(Denmark) Preben Eriksen
1985	Monmore Green Stadium	Not staged		
1986	Monmore Green Stadium	Not staged		
1987	Monmore Green Stadium	(United States) Sam Ermolenko	(Denmark) Hans Nielsen	(Denmark) Jan O Pedersen
1988	Monmore Green Stadium	(Denmark) Hans Nielsen	(United States) Sam Ermolenko	(United States) Mike Faria
1989	Monmore Green Stadium	(Denmark) Jan O Pedersen	(United States) Ronnie Correy	(Denmark) Hans Nielsen
1990	Monmore Green Stadium	(United States) Ronnie Correy	(United States) Billy Hamill	(Denmark) John Jørgensen
1991	Monmore Green Stadium	(United States) Greg Hancock	(United States) Ronnie Correy	(United States) Sam Ermolenko
1992	Monmore Green Stadium	(United States) Ronnie Correy	(United States) Sam Ermolenko	(England) Gary Havelock
1993	Monmore Green Stadium	(England) Joe Screen	(United States) Sam Ermolenko	(Sweden) Peter Karlsson
1994	Monmore Green Stadium	(Australia) Jason Crump	(Sweden) Peter Karlsson	(England) Joe Screen
1995	Monmore Green Stadium	(United States) Greg Hancock	(Sweden) Peter Karlsson	(England) Joe Screen
1996	Monmore Green Stadium	Not staged		
1997	Monmore Green Stadium	(Sweden) Mikael Karlsson	(United States) Sam Ermolenko	(Denmark) Jesper B Jensen
1998	Monmore Green Stadium	(United States) Greg Hancock	(England) Mark Loram	(Sweden) Peter Karlsson
1999	Monmore Green Stadium	(Sweden) Peter Karlsson	(England) Joe Screen	(United States) Greg Hancock
2000	Monmore Green Stadium	(Sweden) Peter Karlsson	(Denmark) Nicki Pedersen	(Denmark) Jesper B. Jensen
2001	Monmore Green Stadium	(Sweden) Mikael Karlsson	(United States) Sam Ermolenko	(Australia) Jason Crump
2002	Monmore Green Stadium	(Sweden) Mikael Karlsson	(Sweden) Peter Karlsson	(England) Paul Hurry
2003	Monmore Green Stadium	(Sweden) Mikael Max	(Sweden) Peter Karlsson	(Australia) Leigh Adams
2004	Monmore Green Stadium	(England) David Howe	(Sweden) Peter Karlsson	(England) Scott Nicholls
2005	Monmore Green Stadium	(Sweden) Freddie Lindgren	(Denmark) Hans Andersen	(Australia) Travis McGowan
2006	Monmore Green Stadium	(Sweden) Peter Karlsson	(Sweden) Freddie Lindgren	(Netherlands) Theo Pijper
2007	Monmore Green Stadium	(Sweden) Freddie Lindgren	(England) Scott Nicholls	(England) Chris Harris
2008	Monmore Green Stadium	Postponed		
2009	Monmore Green Stadium	(Sweden) Freddie Lindgren	(England) Chris Harris	(England) Scott Nicholls
2010	Monmore Green Stadium	(Sweden) Freddie Lindgren	(England) Chris Harris	(England) Scott Nicholls
2011	Monmore Green Stadium	(Sweden) Freddie Lindgren	(England) Scott Nicholls	(England) Chris Harris
2012	Monmore Green Stadium	(England) Scott Nicholls	(United States) Ricky Wells	(England) Danny King
2013	Monmore Green Stadium	Postponed		
2014	Monmore Green Stadium	Postponed		
2015	Monmore Green Stadium	(Sweden) Freddie Lindgren	(United States) Ricky Wells	(England) Chris Harris
2016	Monmore Green Stadium	(Sweden) Jacob Thorssell	(Sweden) Freddie Lindgren	(England) Chris Harris
2017	Monmore Green Stadium	Not staged		
2018	Monmore Green Stadium	(England) Chris Harris	(England) Kyle Howarth	(United States) Ricky Wells
2019	Monmore Green Stadium	Not staged		
2020	Monmore Green Stadium	Not staged due to the COVID-19 pandemic		
2021	Monmore Green Stadium	(England) Scott Nicholls	(Australia) Nick Morris	(Australia) Rory Schlein
2022	Monmore Green Stadium	(Australia) Nick Morris	(England) Tom Brennan	(United States) Luke Becker
2023	Monmore Green Stadium	(Australia) Zach Cook	(Australia) Rory Schlein	(England) Tom Brennan

== Results by Rider ==
Country	Driver	First	Second	Third	Podium
(Denmark)	Olsen, Ole	6	2	0	8
(Sweden)	Lindgren, Freddie	6	2	0	8
(Sweden)	Karlsson (Max), Mikael	4	0	0	4
(Sweden)	Karlsson, Peter	3	5	2	10
(Denmark)	Nielsen, Hans	3	2	1	6
(United States)	Hancock, Greg	3	0	1	4
(England)	Nicholls, Scott	2	2	3	7
(United States)	Correy, Ronnie	2	2	0	4
(United States)	Ermolenko, Sam	1	5	1	7
(England)	Harris, Chris	1	2	4	7
(England)	Collins, Peter	1	2	0	3
(Australia)	Morris, Nick	1	1	0	2
(New Zealand)	Briggs, Barry	1	1	0	2
(Australia)	Sanders, Billy	1	1	0	2
(England)	Kennett, Gordon	1	1	0	2
(Denmark)	Pedersen, Jan O	1	0	1	2
(Australia)	Crump, Jason	1	0	1	2
(Sweden)	Michanek, Anders	1	0	0	1
(Australia)	Crump, Phil	1	0	0	1
(England)	Collins, Les	1	0	0	1
(New Zealand)	Shirra, Mitch	1	0	0	1
(England)	Howe, David	1	0	0	1
(Sweden)	Thorssell, Jacob	1	0	0	1
(Australia)	Cook, Zach	1	0	0	1
