= Northampton Foxes =

English motorcycle speedway team

Club information
- Track address: Northampton Shaleway; Brafield/Horton Road; Northamptonshire
- Country: England
- Founded: 2026
- Promoter: Paul Hunsdon / Tony Gaul
- Team manager: Chris Adams
- League: SGB Premiership
- Website: northampton-speedway.com

Club facts
- Colours: Blue, white and orange

Current team
| Rider | CMA |
|---|---|
| (Australia) Jaimon Lidsey |
| (Denmark) Nicolai Klindt |
| (Denmark) Niels-Kristian Iversen |
| (Slovenia) Matej Žagar |
| (Australia) Troy Batchelor |
| (Australia) Kye Thomson |
| (England) Luke Harrison |

Northampton Foxes is Britain's newest speedway team that was formed in 2026 and competes in the highest tier of British speedway, the SGB Premiership.

== History ==
On 7 January 2026 the British Speedway Promoters Ltd. announced that a sixth club would join the SGB Premiership. Subsequently the Northampton Foxes were announced as a new team for the 2026 SGB Premiership.

The team's home venue is at the Northampton Shaleway owned by Spedeworth Motorsports, which previously hosted the Brafield Flying Foxes in the Southern Area League from 1954 to 1955. The nickname adpoted by the team was the Foxes in honour of the former Brafield Flying Foxes and on the 30 March 2026 the team was announced.

== Season summary ==
| Year and league | Position | Notes |
|---|---|---|
| 2026 SGB Premiership | 6th | |
