= 2025 British Speedway Championship =

Medalists
gold medal	Robert Lambert
silver medal	Charles Wright
bronze medal	Dan Bewley

The 2025 British Speedway Championship (sponsored by Attis Insurance) was the 65th edition of the British Speedway Championship. Dan Bewley was the defending champion having won the title in 2024.

The competition consisted of one semi-final and a final, with six riders qualifying from the semi-final and 10 riders seeded to the final. The seeded riders were Dan Bewley, Tom Brennan, Charles Wright, Danny King, Chris Harris, Steve Worrall, Adam Ellis, Anders Rowe, Kyle Howarth and Robert Lambert.

The semi-final was held at Beaumont Park Stadium, Leicester, on Thursday 1 May and the six riders who qualified for the final were Dan Thompson, Drew Kemp, Leon Flint, Dan Gilkes, Lewis Kerr and Craig Cook but Gilkes and Kerr both missed the final through injury (as did seeded rider Kyle Howarth). They were replaced by Craig Cook, Jason Edwards and Vinnie Foord.

The final was held at the National Speedway Stadium in Manchester on 12 May. The final was sponsored by Attis Insurance. The championship was won by Robert Lambert for the second time.

== Results ==
=== The final ===
- (England) National Speedway Stadium, Manchester
- 12 May 2025

Pos.	Rider	Heat scores	Points	SF	Final
1	Robert Lambert	3,2,3,3,3	14	-	3
2	Charles Wright	1,3,3,2,2	11	2	2
3	Dan Bewley	2,3,3,3,3	14	-	1
4	Chris Harris	3,1,1,2,3	10	3	0
5	Adam Ellis	1,1,3,2,3	10	1	
6	Anders Rowe	3,3,0,1,2	9	0	
7	Dan Thompson	3,1,2,1,2	9		
8	Danny King	0,2,1,3,2	8		
9	Craig Cook	1,0,2,3,1	7		
10	Leon Flint	1,3,0,1,1	6		
11	Tom Brennan	0,2,2,2,0	6		
12	Steve Worrall	2,2,1,0,1	6		
13	Connor Mountain	2,0,2,1,0	5		
14	Jason Edwards	2,1,0,0,0	3		
15	Drew Kemp	0,0,1,0,1	2		
16	Vinnie Foord	f,0,0,0,0	0		

=== Under 21 final ===
- (Scotland) Ashfield Stadium, Glasgow
- 18 May 2025

Pos.	Rider	Heat scores	Points	SF	Final
1	Sam Hagon	0,2,2,3,3	10	2	3
2	Joe Thompson	3,2,3,3,3	14	-	2
3	Luke Harrison	3,3,3,1,2	12	3	1
4	William Cairns	2,3,2,3,3	13	-	0
5	Jake Mulford	3,2,3,2,0	10	1	
6	Jody Scott	3,3,3,2,1	12	0	
7	Max Perry	2,3,1,1,2	9		
8	Ace Pijper	0,1,0,2,3	6		
9	Freddy Hodder	1,0,1,3,1	6		
10	Ben Trigger	1,1,2,0,2	6		
11	Luke Killeen ( (Australia) )	2,1,2,0,1	6		
12	Vinnie Foord	0,2,1,2,0	5		
13	Ashton Boughen	2,0,1,1,0	4		
14	Sam McGurk	1,1,0,1,0	3		
15	Senna Summers	0,0,0,0,2	2		
16	Dan Thompson	1,-,-,-,-	1		
17	Jack Shimelt (r)	-,-,0,-,1	1		
18	Stene Pijper (r)	-,0,-,0,-	0		

=== Under 19 final ===
- (England) GT Tyres Arena, Workington
- 11 October 2025

Pos.	Rider	Heat scores	Points
1	Luke Harrison	3,1,2,3,3	12+3
2	Jody Scott	3,2,3,2,2	12+2
3	Cooper Rushen	1,3,3,2,3	12+1
4	William Cairns	3,2,3,1,2	11
5	Vinnie Foord	2,3,2,3,X	10
6	Jordy Loftus ( (Australia) )	3,2,1,3,1	10
7	Ace Pijper	1,1,3,3,2	10
8	Max Perry	2,0,2,1,3	8
9	Freddy Hodder	2,3,1,1,0	7
10	Ben Trigger	1,3,1,2,R	7
11	Ryan Ingram	2,1,2,0,2	7
12	Stene Pijper	0,R,0,1,3	4
13	Harry Fletcher	0,0,1,2,1	4
14	Ashton Vale	R,2,0,0,0	2
15	Jamie Etherington	0,1,0,0,1	2
16	Charlie Southwick	1,0,0,0,0	1
