= Speedway Youth World Championship =

Motorcycle race

- Sport: motorcycle speedway
- Founded: 2010
- Most recent champion: (Denmark) Villads Pedersen
- Most titles: 2 titles: (Czech Republic) Eduard Krčmář (Australia) Matthew Gilmore

The Speedway Youth World Championship, or Speedway Under-16 World Championship, is an annual speedway event held each year and organized by the International Motorcycling Federation (FIM) since 2010.

As of 2022, the title was awarded to the winner of the SGP3 category at the FIM Speedway World Championship.

== History ==
The series was launched as the Speedway 250cc Youth World Cup. At launch it was limited to 250cc speedway bikes and for competitors 16 years of age or under, which has remained ever since. In 2018 it was renamed the Speedway World Youth Championship, before changing names again in 2022 to SGP3.

The event was cancelled in 2020 due to the COVID-19 pandemic.

== Age limits ==
The maximum age is 16 years of age; finishing at the end of the year in which the rider celebrates his or her 16th birthday.

== Past winners ==
=== World Championship (2010–2022) ===
==== Speedway 250cc Youth World Cup (2010–2018) ====
Year	Venue	Winners	Runner-up	3rd place
2010	(Czech Republic) Slaný	(Czech Republic) Eduard Krčmář	(Germany) Valentin Grobauer	(Germany) Michell Hofmann
2011	(Sweden) Norrköping	(Czech Republic) Eduard Krčmář	(Finland) Victor Palovaara	(Czech Republic) Ondřej Smetana
2012	(Croatia) Goričan/ (Czech Republic) Plzeň	(Germany) Michael Härtel	(Czech Republic) Eduard Krčmář	(France) Dimitri Bergé
2013	(Germany) Teterow	(Germany) Daniel Spiller	(Russia) Arsłan Fajzulin	(Czech Republic) Michaela Krupickova
2014	(Poland) Opole	(Germany) Sandro Wassermann	(Germany) Lukas Fienhage	(Netherlands) Darrell De Vries
2015	(France) Lamothe-Landerron	(Australia) Matthew Gilmore	(Denmark) Mads Hansen	(Germany) Lukas Fienhage
2016	(Germany) Güstrow	(Australia) Matthew Gilmore	(Denmark) Mads Hansen	(Australia) Jedd List
2017	(Czech Republic) Prague	(Denmark) Jonas Knudsen	(Poland) Karol Żupiński	(Sweden) Philip Hellström Bängs

==== Speedway Youth World Championship (2018–2022) ====
Year	Venue	Winners	Runner-up	3rd place
2018	(Poland) Toruń	(Germany) Ben Ernst	(Poland) Mateusz Bartkowiak	(Sweden) Philip Hellström Bängs
2019	(Denmark) Holsted	(Denmark) Jesper Knudsen	(Germany) Ben Ernst	(Sweden) Noel Wahlqvist
2020	Cancelled due to the outbreak of COVID-19.			
2021	(Germany) Cloppenburg	(Poland) Oskar Paluch	(Denmark) Nicklas Aagaard	(Denmark) Villads Nagel Christiansen

==== SGP3 (2022–) ====
Year	Venue	Winners	Runner-up	3rd place
2022	(Poland) Wrocław	(Denmark) Mikkel Andersen	(Denmark) Villads Nagel Christiansen	(Poland) Antoni Kawczynski
2023	(Sweden) Målilla	(Sweden) Rasmus Karlsson	(Poland) Maksymilian Pawełczak	(Denmark) Mikkel Andersen
2024	(Poland) Gorzów	(Poland) Maksymilian Pawełczak	(Australia) Beau Bailey	(United Kingdom) William Cairns
2025	(Czech Republic) Prague	(Denmark) Villads Pedersen	(Slovenia) Sven Cerjak	(Australia) Beau Bailey
2026	(Poland) Wrocław	(Poland) Franciszek Szczyrba	(United States) Brady Landon	(Denmark) Elias Jamil Jensen

== See also ==
- Individual Speedway Junior World Championship (U-21)
- Team Speedway Junior World Championship (U-21)
- Individual Speedway World Championship, Speedway Grand Prix
- Individual Speedway Junior European Championship (U-19)
