= Zach Cook =

Australian speedway rider

- Born: 15 July 1999 (age 27); Cowra, New South Wales, Australia
- Nationality: Australian

Career history

Great Britain
- 2021: Plymouth
- 2022–2025: Poole
- 2023: Wolverhampton
- 2024: Birmingham
- 2025: Belle Vue

Poland
- 2022–2023: Toruń

Individual honours
- 2023: Olympique

Team honours
- 2022, 2024: tier 2 League champion
- 2022, 2024: tier 2 KO Cup winner

Zach Cook (born 15 July 1999) is a speedway rider from Australia.

== Speedway career ==
Cook signed for Plymouth Gladiators for the SGB Championship 2021 season. The following season in 2022, he rode for the Poole Pirates in the SGB Championship 2022, and was instrumental in helping Poole retain their tier 2 League and Knockout Cup double crown.

In 2023, Cook signed for Wolverhampton Wolves, where he would make his Premiership debut in the SGB Premiership 2023. He also re-signed for Poole for the SGB Championship 2023. Late in the 2023 season, Cook won the Olympique.

Cook re-signed for Poole for their 2024 Championship and knockout cup winning season and moved to join the Birmingham Brummies in the Premiership, following the demise of Wolverhampton.

Cook signed for the Premiership champions, the Belle Vue Aces for the 2025 season.

== Personal life ==
Cook's brother is fellow professional rider Ben Cook.
