= Mikkel Andersen (speedway rider, born 2008) =

Danish speedway rider

- Born: 26 April 2008 (age 18); Horsens, Denmark
- Nationality: Danish

Career history

Denmark
- 2023–2026: SES

Poland
- 2024–2026: Wrocław
- 2025: Łódź

Sweden
- 2026: Smederna

Individual honours
- 2025: Danish 21 champion
- 2022: SGP3 world champion

Mikkel Moller Andersen (born 26 April 2008) is a motorcycle speedway from Denmark.

== Biography ==
Andersen was born to a speedway family, his father Brian Andersen earned 12 caps for the Denmark national speedway team. and his uncle Jan Andersen earned one cap for the Denmark national team.

In 2022, Andersen won the Speedway Youth World Championship (known as the SGP3). He was also the Danish and Nordic U16 champion.

Andersen's first senior season saw him ride for Sønderjylland Elite Speedway during the 2023 Danish speedway season. Also during 2023, he won the bronze medal behind Rasmus Karlsson in the 2023 SGP3.

In 2024, Andersen made his debut in the world's premier speedway league, the Ekstraliga, riding for Wrocław.

In August 2025, Andersen won the Danish Under 21 Individual Speedway Championship, held at Slangerup Speedway Center.
