= Will Cairns =

English speedway rider

- Born: 29 June 2009 (age 17); Aylesbury, England
- Nationality: British (English)

Career history
- 2024–2026: Belle Vue
- 2024–2026: Poole

Team honours
- 2025: League champion (tier 2)
- 2025: KO Cup (tier 2)

William "Will" Cairns (29 June 2009) is a motorcycle speedway from England.

== Biography ==
Cairns born in Aylesbury, England, came to prominence in 2024 after winning the British 500cc Youth Championship. He then secured a bronze medal at the 2024 Speedway Youth World Championship. He also raced in the NORA league and finished fourth in the 500cc British championship.

As soon as he turned 16 years-old, Cairns was signed by Poole Pirates for the SGB Championship 2025 season, where he gained success in winning the Championship and Knockout Cup double with the club.

After making an appearance in the highest league of British speedway (the Premiership) in 2025, Cairns secured a rising star berth with the Belle Vue Aces in the 2026 SGB Premiership.
