= Mitchell McDiarmid =

Australian speedway rider

Mitch McDiarmid
- Born: 21 March 2008 (age 18); Perth, Western Australia
- Nationality: Australian

Career history

Great Britain
- 2025: Oxford Cheetahs

Poland
- 2025: Zielona Góra

Individual honours
- 2025, 2026: Western Australia champion

Mitchell McDiarmid (born 21 March 2008) is a motorcycle speedway from Australia.

== Biography ==
McDiarmid was born in Perth, Western Australia and came to prominence after winning the U16 Australian championship in 2022.

In November 2024, McDiarmid made history at the Pinjar Park Speedway by becoming the youngest ever winner of the Western Australian Championship.

McDiarmid began his United Kingdom career when he signed for Oxford Cheetahs to race during the 2025 season. Additionally, he signed for Falubaz Zielona Góra to ride in the Ekstraliga during the 2025 Polish speedway season.

McDiarmid's success during his maiden season led him to being selected as a permanent wild card rider for the FIM Speedway Under-21 World Championship series.

In November 2025, McDiramind successfully retained his Western Australian Championship.
