= Lewis Rose =

English speedway rider

- Born: 5 September 1989 (age 37); Reading, Berkshire
- Nationality: British (English)

Career history
- 2013-2014: King's Lynn Young Stars
- 2013: Somerset Rebels
- 2014-2018: Newcastle Diamonds
- 2014, 2016-2018: King's Lynn Stars
- 2015: Swindon Robins

Lewis Rose (born 5 September 1989) is an English speedway rider.

== Career ==
Born in Reading, Rose was a latecomer to speedway, initially riding motocross before working his way through the Young Stars system at parent club King's Lynn. In 2014 after just one season in speedway, Rose was given a reserve place in the Elite League side of King's Lynn. He also joined the Newcastle Diamonds in the Premier League who he rode for until the end of 2018.

Ahead of the 2015 reserve draft King's Lynn were keen to keep Rose as well as his reserve partner of 2014 Lewis Kerr. However they were only allowed to protect one of their riders, and they selected Kerr. Rose then made the move to the Swindon Robins for the 2015 season before returning to Kings Lynn from 2016 to 2018.
