= Carl Wilkinson (speedway rider) =

British speedway rider (born 1981)

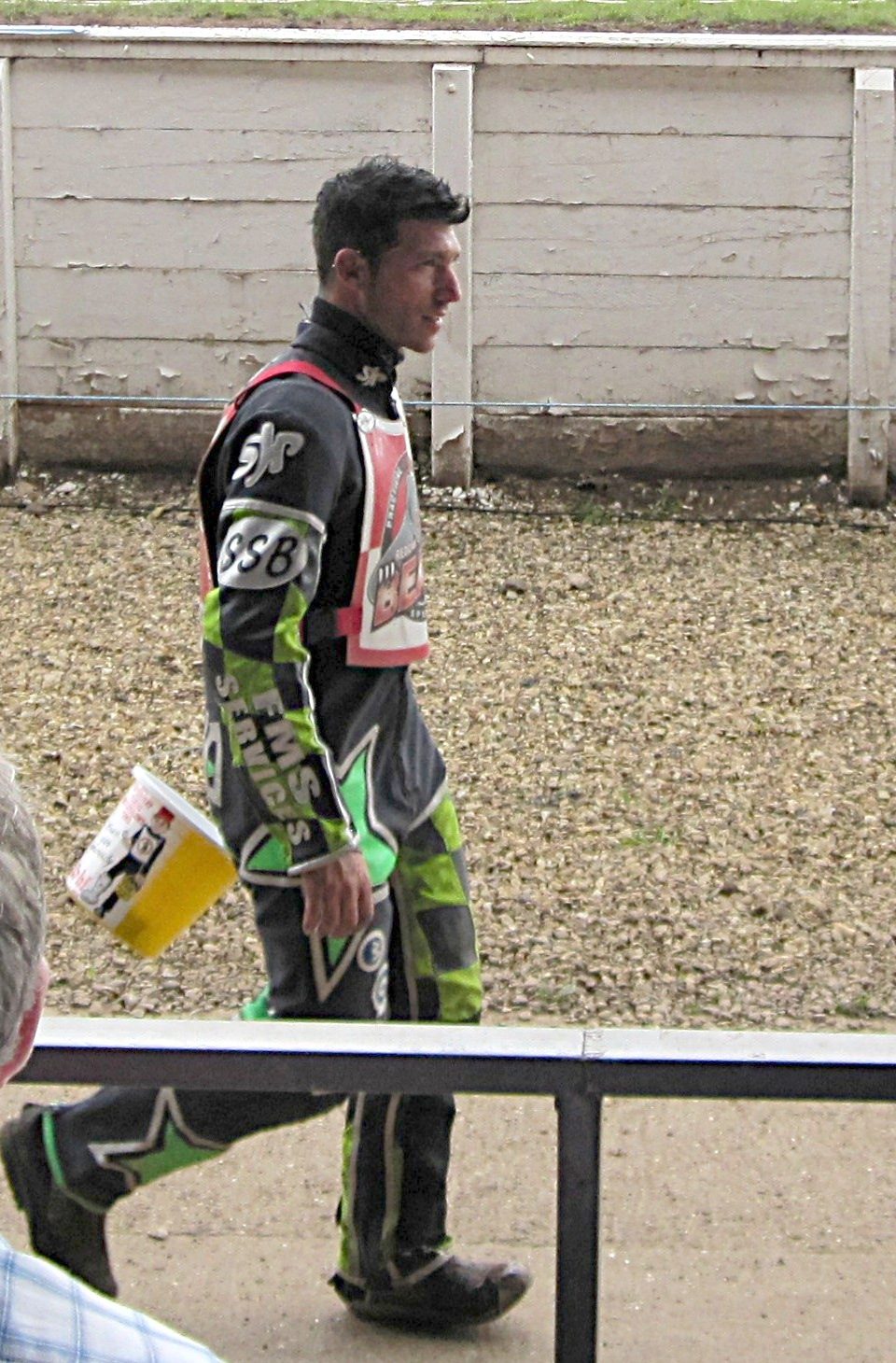
- Born: 16 May 1981 (age 45); Boston, England
- Nationality: British (English)

Career history
- 1997: Peterborough
- 1999, 2016: King's Lynn
- 2000–2001, 2005: Boston
- 2000, 2007, 2018: Newcastle
- 2000: Glasgow
- 2001–2006: Newport
- 2005: Berwick
- 2005–2006, 2008–2010: Ipswich
- 2007: Wolverhampton
- 2008–2011, 2015–2017: Scunthorpe
- 2012–2014: Redcar

Team honours
- 1997: Conference League Champion
- 2000: Conference KO Cup Winner

Carl Adam Wilkinson (born 16 May 1981) is a former motorcycle speedway rider from England.

== Career ==
Born in Boston, England, Wilkinson started his career with the Peterborough Panthers in the Conference League in 1997 a week before his sixteenth birthday. It took another two seasons before he was awarded a regular Conference League ride when he was signed by his local club, the Boston Barracudas in 2000.

Wilkinson has ridden for Great Britain at under-21 level. He won the Conference League with the Peterborough Pumas in 1997 and the Conference League KO Cup with the Boston Barracudas in 2000.

Wilkinson was retained by Boston for 2001, but 2002 saw him signed up by the Newport Wasps for their Premier League team, where he recorded a 4.35 average in his first season. He improved that figure to 4.95 in 2003. He recorded a 4.82 average in 2004 but was forced out of their line-up in 2005 due to the points limit. Wilkinson was not offered a team place with a Premier League club in 2005 so he rejoined the Barracudas in the Conference League. His form did not go unnoticed by the Berwick Bandits and in June was signed up to ride for the rest of the season.

The 2006 season saw Wilkinson return his parent club Newport and he finished second of their team averages on 6.99. He was snapped up by the Newcastle Diamonds in 2007 and finished the season with an average of 6.32. He also made nine appearances for the Wolverhampton Wolves, recording an Elite League average of just over three.

The Scunthorpe Scorpions signed Wilkinson on a full transfer from Newport for their maiden Premier League season in 2008 and he stayed until 2011. In 2009, he shared a reserve berth in the Elite League for the Ipswich Witches. From 2012 to 2015, he rode for Redcar Bears in the Premier League, moving back to Scunthorpe Scorpions in 2015. In 2016, he rode for Scunthorpe and also returned to the Elite League riding at reserve for King's Lynn.

Wilkinson spent 2017 with Scunthorpe before one final season with Newcastle in 2018. He retired after the 2018 season.
