= Luke Harrison =

English speedway rider (born 2007)

- Born: 15 June 2007 (age 19); Scunthorpe, England
- Nationality: British (English)

Career history
- 2023: Workington
- 2023: Redcar
- 2024–2025: Scunthorpe

Individual honours
- 2025: British U-19 champion

Luke Harrison (born 15 June 2007) is a motorcycle speedway rider from England.

== Career ==
Harrison started racing motorbikes from the age of six and made his competitive debut in 2022 riding for Mildenhall Fen Tigers. After turning 16, he was allowed to join the British speedway leagues and signed for Workington Comets. He made his league debut during the 2023 National Development League speedway season but also featured in the SGB Championship 2023 for Redcar Bears.

After a successful rookie season, Harrison had made such a significant impact that he was signed by Polish team Motor Lublin in Poland for the U24 Polish League. He also joined Scunthorpe Scorpions for the SGB Championship 2024, where he remained a second year for the SGB Championship 2025.

Harrison became the British U-19 champion after winning 2025 title.
