= Danny King (speedway rider) =

British speedway rider (born 1986)

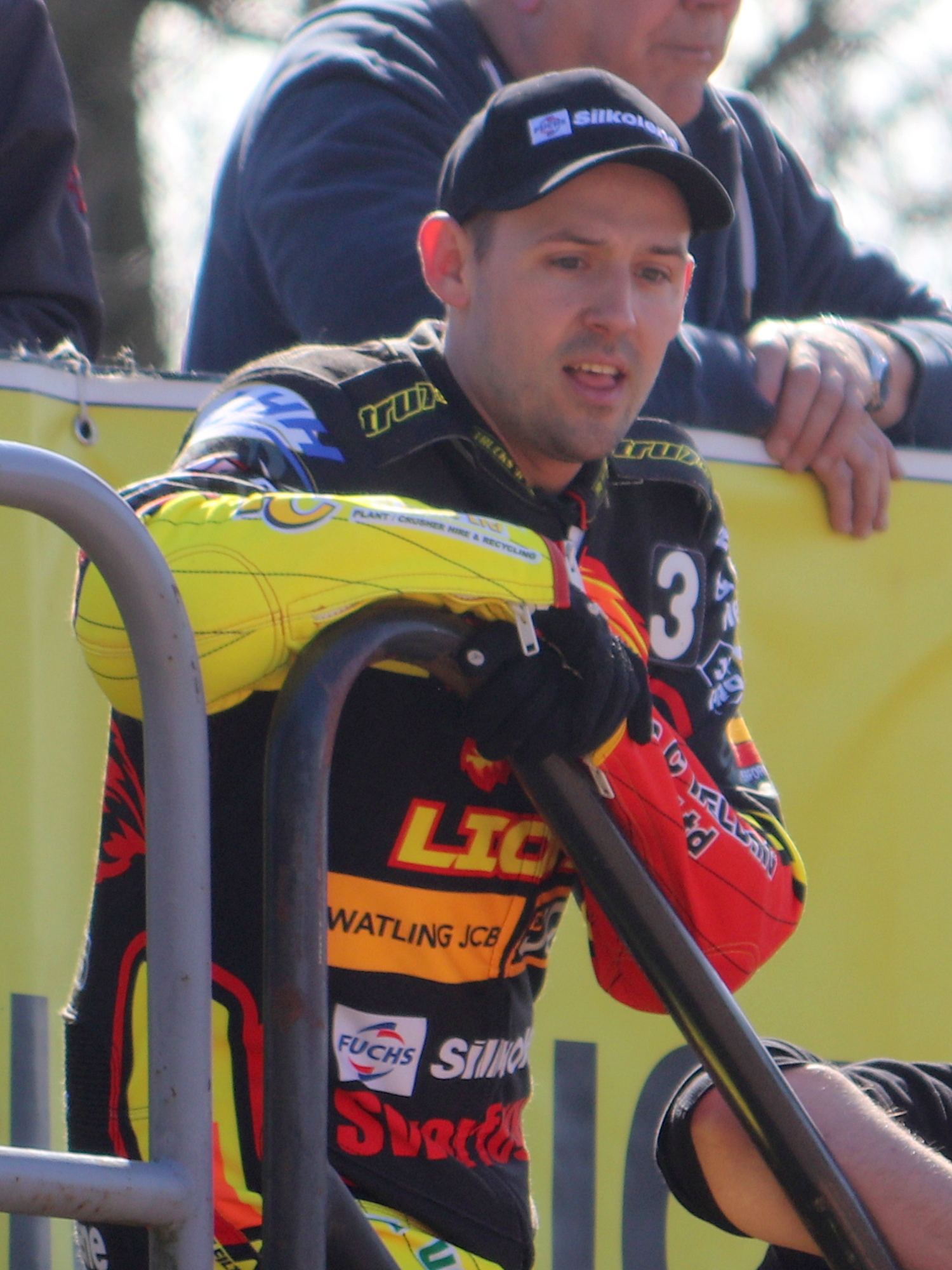
- Born: 14 August 1986 (age 40); Maidstone, England
- Nationality: British (English)

Career history

Great Britain
- 2001–2003, 2007–2008: Peterborough
- 2002: Swindon
- 2003, 2014: Arena Essex/Lakeside
- 2003: Reading
- 2003–2004, 2006: Mildenhall
- 2003–2006, 2009–2010, 2015–2026: Ipswich
- 2005: Rye House
- 2011–2014: Birmingham
- 2014: Newcastle
- 2015–2016: Coventry
- 2017–2018: Leicester
- 2019: Sheffield
- 2020–2022: Poole
- 2023–2025: Redcar

Poland
- 2007–2009: Ostrów
- 2010: Poznan
- 2011: Grudziądz
- 2013: Łódź
- 2015: Piła

Sweden
- 2008: Smederna
- 2011: Dackarna
- 2012: Västervik

Denmark
- 2015: Munkebo

Individual honours
- 2016: British Champion
- 2004: British Under 18 Champion

Team honours
- 2025: tier 1 league champions
- 2022: tier 1 pairs winner
- 2023: tier 1 KO Cup winner
- 2005, 2021, 2022: tier 2 league champions
- 2021, 2022: tier 2 KO Cup winner
- 2005: tier 2 Premier Trophy
- 2015: tier 2 pairs winner
- 2002, 2003, 2004, 2024: tier 3 league champions
- 2003: tier 3 KO Cup winner

Daniel Robert King (born 14 August 1986) is a British speedway rider. He earned six international caps for the Great Britain national speedway team.

== Career ==
Born in Maidstone, King began his career in 2001 with Peterborough Pumas. He has raced for Ipswich Witches, Birmingham Brummies, Lakeside Hammers, and Coventry Bees in the Elite League. His brother Jason was also a speedway rider.

In 2007, King finished fifth in the British Championship and qualified as a reserve for the 2007 British Grand Prix. In September 2007, he was selected to represent Great Britain for the 2007 Under 21-World Cup Final.

King captained the Birmingham Brummies in 2011, when the club were accepted into the Elite League. In 2015, he won the Premier League Pairs Championship partnering Rohan Tungate, for Ipswich Witches during the 2015 Premier League speedway season.

On 13 June 2016, King became British Champion for the first time in his career after winning the 2016 British Speedway Championship. During the 2016 Elite League he finished 8th in the division 1 averages riding for Coventry Bees and 2nd in the averages riding for Ipswich Witches. The following season he joined the Leicester Lions in division 1 and spent two seasons with them, while still impressing for Ipswich in division 2. In 2019, Ipswich moved up a division to the SGB Premiership 2019, which resulted in King riding for them in the top tier and joining Sheffield Tigers in division 2.

During 2021 and 2022, King rode for the Ipswich Witches in the SGB Premiership and the Poole Pirates in the SGB Championship. His move to Poole resulted in a collection of silverware as he captained the Pirates to league and cup double during the SGB Championship 2021. The following season (with King as captain again) Poole successfully defended their League and British Division 2 KO Cup titles. In addition, he won the Premiership pairs with Ipswich.

In 2023, King signed for Ipswich for the SGB Premiership 2023, it was a 7th consecutive season with the club and he captained the team when they won the Knockout Cup. He also signed for Redcar Bears for the SGB Championship 2023 after being released by Poole. He remained the Ipswich captain for 2024. He re-signed for Redcar for the 2024 season.

King won the 2024 Pairs Championship with Charles Wright. In 2025, he helped Ipswich win the SGB Premiership 2025.

== Honours and international competitions ==
- British Under-18 Champion (2004)
- British Champion (2016) – Belle Vue (13 points)

=== Speedway Grand Prix ===
1 SGP, 7 points (2016).

=== Others ===
- Individual U-21 World Championship
  - 2005 – (Austria) Stadion Wiener Neustadt – 15th place (4 points)
  - 2007 – (Italy) Pista Olimpia Terenzano – 9th place (3 points)
- Team U-21 World Championship:
  - 2007 – (Germany) Altes Stadion Abensberg – Silver medal (5 points)
- Speedway World Cup
  - 2016 - 2nd
